= Vic Damone discography =

American singer-actor

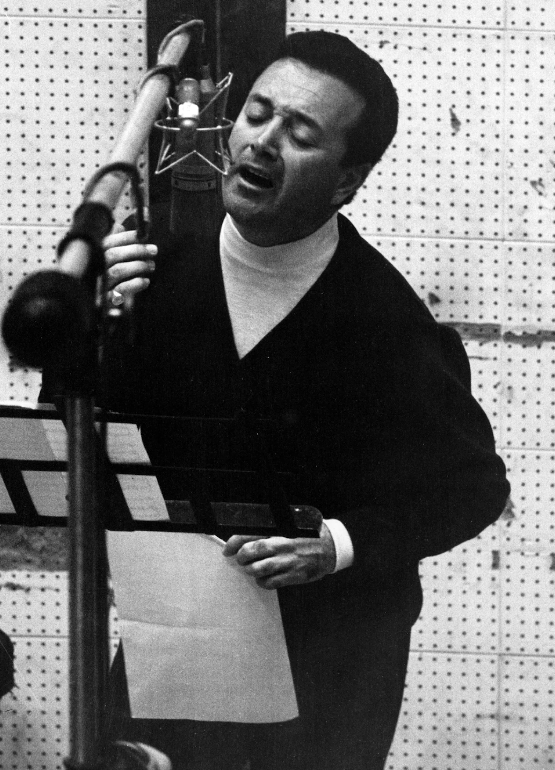
- Damone in RCA's recording studio
- Studio albums: 31
- Live albums: 3
- Singles: 115

Vito Rocco Farinola (June 12, 1928 – February 11, 2018), known professionally as Vic Damone, was an American singer and actor. His discography comprises 31 original studio albums, 3 original live albums, various compilation and archival projects, and 115 singles.

== Albums ==
=== Studio albums ===
Year	Album	Peak positions	
Year	Album	US BB	US CB
1950	Vic Damone	—	—
1950	All Time Song Hits Sung by Vic Damone	—	—
1950	Vic Damone Sings America's Favorite Songs	—	—
1952	April in Paris and Other Great Favorites	—	—
1953	Ebb Tide	—	—
1953	Amor	—	—
1956	That Towering Feeling!	14	—
1957	Thee I Love	—	—
1958	Angela Mia	—	—
1958	Closer Than a Kiss	—	—
1959	This Game of Love	—	—
1960	On the Swingin' Side	—	—
1961	Linger Awhile with Vic Damone	64	31
1962	Strange Enchantment	—	—
1962	The Lively Ones	57	—
1962	Young and Lively	—	—
1963	My Baby Loves to Swing	—	—
1963	The Liveliest	—	—
1964	On the Street Where You Live	—	—
1965	You Were Only Fooling	86	91
1965	Country Love Songs	—	117
1966	Stay with Me	—	—
1967	On the South Side of Chicago	—	—
1967	The Damone Type of Thing	—	—
1968	Why Can't I Walk Away	—	—
1969	Don't Let Me Go	—	—
1977	Feelings	—	—
1977	In San Francisco	—	—
1981	Make Someone Happy	—	—
1981	Now	—	—
1981	Christmas with Vic Damone	—	—
1982	Now and Forever	—	—
1985	I Just Called to Say I Love You	—	—
1997	Greatest Love Songs of the Century	—	—

== Singles ==
Year	Song title (A-side, B-side) Both sides from same album except where indicated	Chart position			Album
Year	Song title (A-side, B-side) Both sides from same album except where indicated	^{US}	^{US AC}	^{UK}	Album
1947	"I Have But One Heart" b/w "Ivy"	7	—	—	Vic Damone
1947	"You Do" b/w "Angela Mia"	7	—	—	Vic Damone
1947	"For Once In Your Life" b/w "Come Back to Sorrento"	—	—	—	Non-LP tracks
1947	"Silent Night" (with The Mercury Chorale) b/w "Ave Maria" (with The Mercury Chorale)	—	—	—	Non-LP tracks
1947	"I'll Always Be in Love with You" b/w "Music From Beyond The Moon"	—	—	—	Non-LP tracks
1947	I'll Dance at Your Wedding b/w "Serenade of the Bells"	—	—	—	Non-LP tracks
1948	"Thoughtless" b/w "Love Is So Terrific"	22	—	—	Non-LP tracks
1948	"Panis angelicus" (with The Mercury Chorale) b/w "Crown Without a Thorn" (with The Mercury Chorale)	—	—	—	Non-LP tracks
1948	"Haunted Heart" b/w "Tell Me a Story"	—	—	—	Non-LP tracks
1948	"My Fair Lady" b/w "Laroo, Laroo, Lilli Bolero"	27	—	—	Non-LP tracks
1948	"It's Magic" b/w "It's You Or No One"	24	—	—	Non-LP tracks
1948	"Lillette" b/w "The Night Has a Thousand Eyes"	—	—	—	Non-LP tracks
1948	"Say Something Sweet to Your Sweetheart"(with Patti Page) b/w "Isn't It Romantic?"(with Patti Page)	23	—	—	Non-LP tracks
1949	"Again" (gold record) b/w "I Love You So Much It Hurts"	6	—	—	Vic Damone
1949	"You're Breaking My Heart" (gold record)	1	—	—	Vic Damone
1949	"The Four Winds and the Seven Seas"	16	—	—	Ebb Tide
1949	"My Bolero" b/w "Through A Long and Sleepless Night"	10	—	—	Vic Damone
1949	"Why Was I Born?" b/w "Lonely Night"	20	—	—	Non-LP tracks
1949	"Sitting by the Window" b/w "Nice To Know You Care"	29	—	—	Non-LP tracks
1950	"A Pretty Girl Is Like a Melody" b/w "Remember"	—	—	—	Vic Damone Sings America's Favorite Songs
1950	"I'll See You in My Dreams" b/w "Something To Remember You By"	—	—	—	Vic Damone Sings America's Favorite Songs
1950	"My Blue Heaven" b/w "The World Is Waiting for the Sunrise"	—	—	—	Vic Damone Sings America's Favorite Songs
1950	"This Is The Night" b/w "Don't Say Goodbye"	—	—	—	Non-LP tracks
1950	"Mama" b/w "Operetta"	—	—	—	Non-LP tracks
1950	"When The Lights Are Low"" b/w "It's a Marshmallow World"	—	—	—	Non-LP tracks
1950	"God's Country" b/w "Where I Belong"	27	—	—	Vic Damone
1950	"If We Could Be A-L-O-N-E" b/w "Where Can I Go"	—	—	—	Non-LP tracks
1950	"Vagabond Shoes" b/w "I Hadn't Anyone Till You"	17	—	—	Non-LP tracks
1950	"Tzena, Tzena, Tzena" b/w "I Love That Girl"	6	—	—	Non-LP tracks
1950	"Just Say I Love Her"	13	—	—	Non-LP tracks
1950	"Can Anyone Explain? (No! No! No!)"	25	—	—	Non-LP tracks
1950	"Cincinnati Dancing Pig" b/w "Forbidden Love"	11	—	—	Non-LP tracks
1950	"My Heart Cries for You"	4	—	—	Non-LP tracks
1950	"Music by the Angels"	18	—	—	Non-LP tracks
1951	"Tell Me You Love Me" b/w "Little Cafe Paree"	21	—	—	Non-LP tracks
1951	"If" b/w "You And Your Beautiful Eyes"	28	—	—	Non-LP tracks
1951	"My Truly, Truly Fair" b/w "My Life's Desire"	4	—	—	Non-LP tracks
1951	"Longing for You" b/w "The Son of a Sailor"	12	—	—	Non-LP tracks
1951	"I Can See You" b/w "Wonder Why"	—	—	—	Non-LP tracks
1951	"In the Cool, Cool, Cool of the Evening" b/w "How D'ya Like Your Eggs In The Morning"	—	—	—	Non-LP tracks
1951	"Calla Calla" b/w "It's A Long Way (From Your House To My House)"	13	—	—	Non-LP tracks
1952	"Jump Through the Ring" b/w "My Funny Valentine"	22	—	—	April In Paris And Other Great Favorites
1952	"Here in My Heart" b/w "Tomorrow Never Comes"	8	—	—	Non-LP tracks
1952	"The Girls Are Marching" b/w "Come Hell Or High Water"	—	—	—	Non-LP tracks
1952	"Take My Heart"	30	—	—	Non-LP tracks
1952	"Rosanne"	23	—	—	Amor
1952	"Rosanne" b/w "Al-Lee-O Al-Lee-Ay"	—	—	—	Amor
1952	"Nina Never Knew" b/w "Johnny with the Bandy Legs"	—	—	—	Non-LP tracks
1952	"Sugar" b/w "Amor"	13	—	—	Amor
1953	"Afraid" b/w "Love Light"	—	—	—	Amor
1953	"April in Portugal" b/w "I'm Walking Behind You"	10	—	—	Ebb Tide
1953	"Serenade in Blue" b/w "That Old Feeling"	—	—	—	Non-LP tracks
1953	"Eternally" b/w "Simonetta"	12	—	—	Ebb Tide
1953	"Ebb Tide" b/w "If I Could Make You Mine"	10	—	—	Ebb Tide
1953	"A Village in Peru" b/w "Stranger in Paradise"	30	—	—	Non-LP tracks
1954	"Once And Only Once" (with David Carroll And His Orchestra) b/w "In My Own Quiet Way" (with David Carroll And His Orchestra)	—	—	—	Non-LP tracks
1954	"The Breeze and I" b/w "To Love You (Italia Mia)"	21	—	—	Ebb Tide
1954	"The Sparrow Sings" b/w "Until You Came To Me"	27	—	—	Non-LP tracks
1954	" Wind Song" b/w "Silk Stockings"	—	—	—	Non-LP tracks
1955	"Foolishly" (with Hugo Peretti And His Orchestra) b/w "Hello Mrs. Jones Is Mary There?" (with Hugo Peretti And His Orchestra)	—	—	—	Non-LP tracks
1955	"Por Favor" b/w "A Man Doesn't Know"	73	—	—	Non-LP tracks
1955	"Don't Keep It A Secret" b/w "A Man Doesn't Know"	—	—	—	Non-LP tracks
1956	"Sure" b/w "Help Me"	—	—	—	Non-LP tracks
1956	"On the Street Where You Live" b/w "We All Need Love"	4	—	1	On the Street Where You Live
1956	"I Cried For You" b/w "To Love Again"	—	—	—	Non-LP tracks
1956	"War and Peace" b/w "Speak, My Love"	59	—	—	Non-LP tracks
1956	"One Little Boy" b/w "When My Love Smiles (Rien Ne Pourra Changer)"	—	—	—	Non-LP tracks
1956	"Long Before I Knew You" b/w "You Stepped Out of a Dream"	—	—	—	Non-LP tracks
1957	"Do I Love You" b/w "The Legend Of The Bells"	62	—	—	Non-LP tracks
1957	"An Affair to Remember" b/w "In the Eyes of the World"	16	—	29	Non-LP tracks
1957	"Good Nite" (with Jo Stafford) b/w "Silence Is Golden" (with Jo Stafford)	—	—	—	Non-LP tracks
1957	"Junior Miss" b/w "I Can't Close The Book"	—	—	—	Non-LP tracks
1957	"The Gift Of Love" b/w "Unafraid"	—	—	—	Non-LP tracks
1958	"Gigi" b/w "Life Does A Man A Favor"	88	—	—	Non-LP tracks
1958	"The Only Man on the Island" b/w "À Toujours (Till Always)"	—	—	24	Non-LP tracks
1958	"Forever New" b/w "Ooooh, My Love"	—	—	—	Non-LP tracks
1958	"Separate Tables" b/w "We Kiss in a Shadow"	—	—	—	Non-LP tracks
1959	"Penny Serenade" b/w "Save A Kiss"	—	—	—	Non-LP tracks
1959	"A New Romance In Old Roma" b/w "My Heart Has Many Dreams"	—	—	—	Non-LP tracks
1959	"The Night Has a Thousand Eyes" b/w "On A Sunday Afternoon"	—	—	—	Non-LP tracks
1960	"Your Smile" b/w "Very Warm"	—	—	—	Non-LP tracks
1960	"Never Will I Marry" b/w "Christine"	—	—	—	Non-LP tracks
1960	"Never Like This" b/w "What Fools We Mortals Be"	—	—	—	Non-LP tracks
1960	"If Ever I Would Leave You" b/w "I'll Be Your Lover"	—	—	—	Non-LP tracks
1961	"Adrift On A Star" b/w "The Pleasure Of Her Company"	—	—	—	Non-LP tracks
1961	"Theme From "By Love Possessed" b/w "If It's The Last Thing I Do"	—	—	—	Non-LP tracks
1961	"Tender Is The Night" b/w "Something You Never Had Before"	—	—	—	Non-LP tracks
1962	"Once Upon A Time" b/w "No Strings "	—	—	—	Non-LP tracks
1962	"Ebb Tide" b/w "My Heart Will Tell You"	—	—	—	Ebb Tide
1962	"Vieni, Vieni" b/w "Cathy"	—	—	—	Non-LP tracks
1962	"What Kind of Fool Am I?" b/w "Charmaine"	131	—	—	The Livelist
1963	"You're Just Another Pretty Face" b/w "/One Hand, One Heart"	—	—	—	Non-LP tracks
1963	"Wives and Lovers" b/w "/Oooh! Look-a There Ain't She Pretty?"	—	—	—	Non-LP tracks
1963	"At Long Last Love" b/w "You're Nobody 'til Somebody Loves You"	—	—	—	The Livelist
1963	"Sweet Someone" b/w/ "Again"	—	—	—	Non-LP tracks
1964	"The Breaking Point" b/w/ "Who Are You Now"	—	—	—	Non-LP tracks
1964	"I'm Gonna Miss You" b/w/ "Where Did The Magic Go?"	—	—	—	Non-LP tracks
1964	"On the Street Where You Live" b/w/ "Maria"	—	—	—	On the Street Where You Live
1965	"You Were Only Fooling" b/w/ "Please Help Me, I'm Falling"	30	8	—	You Were Only Fooling
1965	"Why Don't You Believe Me?" b/w/ "The Thrill Of Lovin' You"	127	25	—	You Were Only Fooling
1965	"Lost and Found" b/w/ "Turn Around"	—	35	—	Non-LP tracks
1965	"Tears (For Souvenirs)" b/w/ Never Too Late	—	—	—	Non-LP tracks
1966	"Wonder" b/w "Two Of A Kind"	—	—	—	Non-LP tracks
1966	"You Don't Have to Say You Love Me" b/w "Stay (Reste)"	—	—	—	On the South Side of Chicago
1966	"What Is a Woman" b/w "Ciao Compare"	—	—	—	On the South Side of Chicago
1966	"Love Me Longer (Francesca's Theme)" b/w "Pretty Butterfly (No Balanco De Jequibau)"	—	—	—	On the South Side of Chicago
1967	"On the South Side of Chicago" b/w "A Quiet Tear"	—	22	—	On the South Side of Chicago
1967	"It Makes No Difference" b/w "I'll Sleep Tonight"	—	12	—	On the South Side of Chicago
1967	"The Glory of Love" b/w "Come Live With Me"	—	15	—	Why Can't I Walk Away
1968	"Nothing to Lose" b/w "Goin' Out Of My Head"	—	40	—	Why Can't I Walk Away
1968	"Why Can't I Walk Away" b/w "When You've Laughed All Your Laughter"	—	21	—	Why Can't I Walk Away
1969	"To Make a Big Man Cry" b/w "Take Me Walking In Your Mind"	—	31	—	Non-LP tracks
1969	"Don't Let Me Go" b/w "Here's That Rainy Day"	—	—	—	Non-LP tracks
1972	Come Live Your Life With Me b/w "Tomorrow Belongs To The Children"	—	—	—	Non-LP tracks
1977	My World Is You b/w "Some Hearts Never Learn"	—	—	—	Non-LP tracks
1977	How Did She Look b/w "My World Is You"	—	—	—	Non-LP tracks
1978	"The Christmas Song" b/w "Silver Bells"	—	—	—	Non-LP tracks
1978	"Christmas In San Francisco" b/w "Christmas In San Francisco (Live Performance)"	—	—	—	Non-LP tracks
