= On the Street Where You Live (disambiguation) =

"On the Street Where You Live" is a song from the 1956 Broadway musical My Fair Lady.

On the Street Where You Live may also refer to:

- On the Street Where You Live (album), a 1964 album by Vic Damone
- On the Street Where You Live (TV series), an Irish documentary television series
- On The Street Where You Live, a 2001 novel by Mary Higgins Clark
