= The Damone Type of Thing =

Studio album by Vic Damone
- Released: November 20, 1967
- Studio: RCA Victor's Music Center of the World (Hollywood, California)
- Genre: Traditional pop: vocal pop
- Length: 32:02
- Label: RCA
- Producer: Neely Plumb

Vic Damone chronology
On the South Side of Chicago (1967)	The Damone Type of Thing (1967)	Why Can't I Walk Away (1968)

The Damone Type of Thing is the twenty-third studio album by American singer Vic Damone, released on November 20, 1967, by RCA Records, and was available both in stereo and mono sound. The project was produced by Neely Plumb. The album received highly positive reviews both upon its release and retrospectively.

== Background and content ==
Vic Damone was a popular singer, originally gaining stardom in the 1950s. In the 1960s, with traditional pop declining as a genre, Damone had much less success, which led him to change labels and eventually sign with RCA Victor in 1966. The Damone Type of Thing was his third album for them, and was recorded in Hollywood, California, with the help of three arrangers: Dick Grove, J. Hill, and Perry Botkin Jr..

In the LP, Damone covered selected contemporary and old romantic ballads, including "Time After Time", "I Got It Bad (and That Ain't Good)", "It Never Entered My Mind", "I Guess I'll Hang My Tears Out to Dry". More recent songs featured were "I Never Go There Any More", "Make Me Rainbows" from the 1967 United Artists motion picture Fitzwilly and "Two for the Road" from the 20th Century Fox film Two for the Road. Two songs that also had recent chart success in 1966 via Chris Montez were "The More I See You" and "Time After Time".

== Critical reception ==
=== Contemporary reviews ===
The album received positive reviews upon its release. Billboard selected the album for a "Pop Special Merit" review, describing the album as "his excellent album", and stated that it "proves that Damone still has one of the best pop standard voices in the business". Cashbox said that Damone "renders a selection of pop melodies in a warm, smooth, and graceful manner." The El Paso Times called it "a quietly sensitive album of an entertainer long confident of his success." Rex Reed on Stereo Review believed that "I can't think of a more pleasant listening experience if you have the better part of an hour to kill," adding that "Like Julius LaRosa, Vic Damone just seems to get mellower with age."

=== Retrospectives ===
Professional ratings
Review scores
Source	Rating
AllMusic	4/5 stars
The Encyclopedia of Popular Music	4/5 stars

Retrospectives were positive as well. Historian Will Friedwald stated that The Damone Type of Thing is an "excellent album, although it does intermingle good stuff and bad." Jason Ankeny of AllMusic praised Perry Botkin's arrangements and wrote that Damone "seizes upon the album's smoky, boozy atmosphere with gusto". Both AllMusic and The Encyclopedia of Popular Music gave the album a four-star ratings, the latter's rating meaning they believed the album was "outstanding" by Damone's usual releases.

== Track listing ==
=== Side one ===
No.	Title	Writer(s)	Length
1.	"Time After Time" (from the Metro-Goldwyn-Mayer picture: It Happened in Brooklyn)	Sammy Cahn, Jule Styne	2:36
2.	"I Got It Bad (and That Ain't Good)"	Duke Ellington, Paul Francis Webster	3:49
3.	"I Guess I'll Hang My Tears Out to Dry" (from the Broadway musical: Glad To See You)	Sammy Cahn, Jule Styne	2:51
4.	"Gone with the Wind"	Allie Wrubel, Herb Magidson	2:06
5.	"I Never Go There Any More"	Rod McKuen, Marty Paich	3:17
6.	"Two for the Road" (from the 20th Century Fox film: Two for the Road)	Henry Mancini, Leslie Bricusse	2:36

=== Side two ===
No.	Title	Writer(s)	Length
1.	"Make Me Rainbows" (from the United Artists motion picture: Fitzwilly)	Alan Bergman, Marilyn Bergman, John Williams	2:27
2.	"It Never Entered My Mind" (from the Broadway musical: Higher and Higher)	Richard Rodgers, Lorenz Hart	4:10
3.	"The More I See You" (from the 20th Century Fox film: Diamond Horseshoe)	Harry Warren, Mack Gordon	2:23
4.	"I'll Find You a Rainbow"	Jeanne Costa, Tony Costa	2:43
5.	"Arrivederci, My Love"	Pietro Garinei, Sandro Giovannini, Renato Rascel, Carl Sigman	2:25

== Personnel ==
All credits are adapted from the liner notes of The Damone Type of Thing.

- Sandy Dvore – cover
- Hank Cicalo – engineer
- Neely Plumb – producer, liner notes
- Perry Botkin Jr. – (tracks: A3 to B1; B5) arranger, conductor
- J. Hill – (tracks: A1 to A2; B2 to B3) arranger, conductor
- Dick Grove – (tracks: B4) arranger, conductor
