= Home (When Shadows Fall) =

1931 popular song

"Home (When Shadows Fall)" is a song written by Harry Clarkson, Geoffrey Clarkson and Peter van Steeden in 1931. van Steeden had a hit with it in 1931.

== Cover versions ==
- Peter van Steeden and His Orchestra (vocal by Dick Robertson - recorded for Victor Records (catalog No. 22868). A hit record in 1931.
- Ruth Etting (1931)
- Arthur Tracy - recorded in December, 1931 for Brunswick Records (catalog No. 6227).
- Merle Johnston Orchestra with Smith Ballew (1931)
- The Dorsey Brothers (1931)
- Louis Armstrong recorded a popular version in 1932. He recorded it again in 1957 for his album Louis Under the Stars.
- Rudy Vallee (1932)
- Gracie Fields (1932)
- Jimmy Grier w/ Dick Webster (1932)
- Mildred Bailey (1933)
- Arthur Tracy (1938)
- Jack Teagarden with Coleman Hawkins (1944)
- Harry James Orchestra (1944)
- Dick Haymes (1944)
- Abe Lyman Orchestra with Frank Munn (1945)
- Johnny Hartman with Erroll Garner (1949)
- Billy Daniels (1949)
- Nat King Cole (1950)
- Muggsy Spanier (1950)
- Jackie Gleason (1957)
- Ray Anthony (1957)
- Margaret Whiting (1957)
- Jane Froman for her album Songs at Sunset (1957)
- Dave King (1958) - a single release.
- Matt Dennis - for his album Welcome Matt (1959)
- Gordon MacRae - for his album Songs For An Evening At Home (1959)
- Mills Brothers - for their album The Mills Brothers Sing (1959).
- The Ventures - for their album Walk, Don't Run (1960)
- Helen Humes - for her album Swingin' with Humes (1961)
- Vic Damone - for his album On the Swingin' Side (1961).
- Sam Cooke - for his album Ain't That Good News (1964)
- Della Reese - for her album C'Mon And Hear Della Reese!(1965)
- Dean Martin - for his album The Dean Martin TV Show (1966)
- Jimmy Rushing - for his album The You and Me That Used to Be (1971)
- Slim Whitman (1972)
- Bob Hope (1994)
- Gerry Mulligan (1994)
- Terry Blaine (2002)
- Hawaiian Pistoleros (2011)
- Paul McCartney - for his standards album, Kisses on the Bottom, released February 7, 2012.

== Film and television appearances ==
In I Live in Grosvenor Square (1945) it is performed by Irene Manning with a band, and then reprised by Cyril Baker who accompanies himself at the piano. Both Manning and Baker were portraying USO entertainers.

The Waltons featured the song in two episodes, sung by Jason (Jon Walmsley) and an Army buddy (Todd Susman) as a duet.

It also makes a brief appearance in Stanley Kubrick's film The Shining, performed by Henry Hall and the Gleneagles Hotel Band. The song reappears in the film's sequel, Doctor Sleep.
