= I Guess I'll Hang My Tears Out to Dry =

"Guess I'll Hang My Tears Out To Dry"

Song by Jane Withers from production Glad To See You
- Published: 1944
- Genre: torch song, jazz standard, pop standard
- Composer: Jule Styne
- Lyricist: Sammy Cahn

"Guess I'll Hang My Tears Out to Dry" is a 1944 torch song and jazz standard, with music by Jule Styne and lyrics by Sammy Cahn. It was introduced on stage by film star Jane Withers in the show Glad To See You, which closed in Boston and never opened on Broadway. The duo Styne and Cahn had previously written songs for several of Withers' films.

== Notable recordings ==
- Harry James (vocalist Kitty Kallen) - Columbia 36778 (1945)
- Frank Sinatra with Axel Stordahl - Columbia 38474 (1946)
- Frank Sinatra - Frank Sinatra Sings for Only the Lonely (1958)
- Cannonball Adderley - Cannonball Takes Charge (1959)
- Dexter Gordon - Go (1962)
- Irene Kral - Better Than Anything (1963)
- Ray Charles - Sweet & Sour Tears (1964)
- Carmen McRae - Bittersweet (1964)
- Sarah Vaughan - Sarah Sings Soulfully (1965)
- Vic Damone – The Damone Type of Thing (1967)
- Linda Ronstadt - What's New (1983)
- Mel Tormé - Sing Sing Sing (1992)
- Diane Schuur - In Tribute (1992)
- Frank Sinatra, Carly Simon - Duets (1993)
- Rosemary Clooney with the Count Basie Orchestra - At Long Last (1998)
- Bobby Caldwell - Come Rain or Come Shine (1999)
- Keith Jarrett Trio - My Foolish Heart (2001)
- Patti LuPone - The Lady With the Torch (2006)
