= Swingin' Down the Lane =

1923 song by Isham Jones and Gus Kahn

Single by Isham Jones' Orchestra
- B-side: "Who's Sorry Now?"
- Published: February 26, 1923 Leo Feist, Inc.
- Released: July 1923
- Recorded: May 4, 1923
- Studio: Brunswick Studios, 799 Seventh Avenue, New York City
- Genre: American dance music, jazz
- Length: 2:59
- Label: Brunswick 2438
- Composer: Isham Jones
- Lyricist: Gus Kahn

Isham Jones' Orchestra singles chronology
"Broken Hearted Melody" (1923)	"Swingin' Down the Lane" (1923)	"When You Walked Out, Someone Else Walked Right In" (1923)

Audio
- Recording of Swingin' Down the Lane, performed by the Isham Jones' Orchestra (1923): file; help

"Swingin' Down the Lane" is a 1923 song composed by Isham Jones with lyrics by Gus Kahn. Jones' instrumental version was second to "March of the Wooden Soldiers" in the list of top songs for 1923. Other popular versions in 1923 were by Ben Bernie, and The Columbians. In addition, John Serry's arrangement was featured on Seeburg jukeboxes during the 1950s.

The 1923 sound recordings of the song entered the public domain in the United States in 2024.

== Other notable recordings ==
- Bing Crosby - recorded November 27, 1947 with John Scott Trotter and His Orchestra.
- Frank Sinatra - included in his album Songs for Swingin' Lovers! (1956)
- Perry Como - for his album We Get Letters (1957)
- Kay Starr - for her album Movin'! (1959)
- Frankie Avalon - for his album Summer Scene (1960)
- Vic Damone - included in his album On the Swingin' Side (1960)

== Film appearances ==
- 1944 Greenwich Village - performed by Vivian Blaine and Don Ameche
- 1947 Mother Wore Tights - sung by Mona Freeman (dubbed by Imogene Lynn), Robert Arthur and chorus
- 1951 I'll See You in My Dreams - sung during the montage with the kids
