= Shangri-La (1946 song) =

Single by The Lettermen

from the album Hurt So Bad
- B-side: "When Summer Ends"
- Released: 1969
- Length: 2:34
- Label: Capitol
- Songwriter(s): Matty Malneck, Carl Sigman, Robert Maxwell

The Lettermen singles chronology
"Hurt So Bad" (1969)	"Shangri-La" (1969)	"Traces/Memories Medley" (1969)

"Shangri-La" is a popular song written by bandleader Matty Malneck and Robert Maxwell in 1946 with lyrics by Carl Sigman. The song is named after Shangri-La, the hidden valley of delight in James Hilton's 1933 novel Lost Horizon.

== Background ==
The term comes from "Shangri-La" as the hidden valley of delight in James Hilton's 1933 novel Lost Horizon. The term "Shangri-La," especially in the 1930s and 1940s, was slang for heaven or paradise, and the song is about the joy of being in love.

== Recordings ==
The first recording was a 2-sided 78 instrumental version by Matty Malneck and His Orchestra (February 7, 1946) for Columbia Records, featuring a harp solo by Robert Maxwell.
Maxwell's own instrumental version for Decca Records (saxophone/organ lead with brass and rhythm), which also featured his harp solo, which is heard in the introduction as well as in the coda section of the song, charted in 1964, reaching #15, and #67 of the Top 100 instrumentals, 1960–69.
Other popular versions (with lyrics) were recorded by The Four Coins in 1957 (#11 US) and by The Lettermen in 1969 (#64 US).

Many versions have been included in artists' albums over the years including:

- Johnny Mathis - The Wonderful World of Make Believe (1964)
- Peggy Lee - In the Name of Love (1964)
- Vic Damone - Strange Enchantment (1962)

== In popular culture ==
Jackie Gleason used "Shangri-La" on his 1950s-60s TV variety show as theme music for his popular millionaire character Reginald van Gleason III.

The song was also used as the opening and closing theme of Radio City Playhouse, a radio anthology series that aired in the late 1940s.
