= I've Found a New Baby =

Popular jazz standard song composed by Jack Palmer

"I've Found a New Baby", also known as "I Found a New Baby", is a popular song written by Jack Palmer and Spencer Williams. It was introduced by Clarence Williams' Blue Five in 1926 and has since been recorded by many artists, making it a popular jazz standard. Popular versions in 1926 were by Ted Lewis and by Ethel Waters.

Sidney Bechet and his New Orleans Feetwarmers recorded a notable version September 15, 1932, Bing Crosby recorded the song on September 5, 1945, with Eddie Heywood and Bobby Darin included the song in his album Winners (1960).

Spencer Williams and Palmer had collaborated in 1924 on the hit song "Everybody Loves My Baby, but My Baby Don't Love Nobody but Me", and Williams had a hit in 1919 with "Royal Garden Blues". All three songs have become standards, and "I've Found a New Baby" is included in the repertoire of almost every traditional jazz band.

Charlie Christian's guitar solo on "I've Found a New Baby" with the Benny Goodman Orchestra in 1940 is considered one of the most influential solos recorded by the guitarist.

A "roaring version" of the song is included on Sonny Rollins' 1958 album Sonny Rollins and the Contemporary Leaders.

== See also ==
- List of 1920s jazz standards
