= Careless Hands =

Song written by Carl Sigman and Bob Hilliard

"Careless Hands" is a popular song written by Carl Sigman and Bob Hilliard, and first recorded in 1948.

The song was originally recorded by Sammy Kaye with vocals by Don Cornell, and then recorded in 1949 by Mel Tormé, whose version reached no.1 on the US pop chart and became Tormé's first major success. It was also recorded by many other singers including Bing Crosby (recorded March 22, 1949) and Al Martino. There were no less than four charted versions in 1949, by Mel Tormé (No. 1), Sammy Kaye (No. 3), Bing Crosby (No. 12) and Bob & Jeanne (No. 21).

In the UK, a version by comedian and entertainer Des O'Connor reached No. 6 on the UK Singles Chart in 1967.

In 1971, "Careless Hands" was recorded by American country music artist Dottie West. It was released as a single, peaking at number 48 on the Billboard Hot Country Singles chart in April 1971. The song was subsequently released on a studio album of the same name.

== Other recordings ==
- 1949: Bob and Alf Pearson - a Parlophone single.
- 1958: Michael Holliday - a single release on the Columbia label.
- 1958: Slim Whitman - a single release for London Records.
- 1960: Kitty Kallen - for her album Honky Tonk Angel, Country Songs with a City Flavor.
- 1964: The Andrews Sisters - included in their album Great Country Hits.
- 1965: Vic Damone - for his album You Were Only Fooling.
- 1984: Jerry Lee Lewis - for his album I Am What I Am.
