= Why Can't I Walk Away =

Studio album by Vic Damone
- Released: November 1968
- Studio: RCA's Music Center of the World, Hollywood, California
- Genre: Traditional pop; vocal pop; easy listening
- Length: 30:36
- Label: RCA Records
- Producer: Neely Plumb; Jack Pleis; Ernie Altschuler

Vic Damone chronology
The Damone Type of Thing (1967)	Why Can't I Walk Away (1968)	Don't Let Me Go (1969)

Singles from Why Can't I Walk Away
- 1. "The Glory of Love" Released: December 1967; 2. "Nothing To Lose" Released: March 1968; 3. "Why Can't I Walk Away" Released: September 1968

Why Can't I Walk Away is the twenty-fourth studio album by American singer Vic Damone, released on November 1968, by RCA Records. It became his final album for the label. The album contained eleven tracks, including three singles. Why Can't I Walk Away was produced by Neely Plumb, Jack Pleis, and Ernie Altschuler. The album was made available only on stereo sound.

== Background and content ==
The album had arrangements by J. Hill, Billy Byers, Joe Parnello, Perry Botkin Jr., and Jack Pleis, with the songs recorded at RCA's Music Center of the World, located in Hollywood, California. It featured his most recent singles: the namesake "Why Can't I Walk Away", "Nothing To Lose" from the 1968 movie The Party, and the top-15 easy listening hit "The Glory of Love". The LP had a mix of covers of old and recent hits that included two songs that also had chart success in 1965 via Little Anthony and the Imperials: "Goin' Out of My Head" and 1967 Otis Redding: "The Glory of Love". "Stardust" was the main standard, originally written in 1927. Other selections were taken from films and musicals.

== Chart performance ==
The single, "The Glory of Love", debuted in the issue dated December 30, 1967, on Billboard magazine's Easy Listening chart, eventually reaching number 15 during a nine-week run on it.

"Nothing to Lose" debuted on the Billboard Easy Listening chart in the issue dated April 27, 1968, and peaked at number 40 during a two-week stay on the chart.

"Why Can't I Walk Away" debuted on the Billboard Easy Listening chart in the issue dated September 14, 1968, returning Damone to the top-25, peaking at number 21 during an eight-week stay on the chart.

== Reception ==
Professional ratings
Review scores
Source	Rating
AllMusic	3/5 stars
Billboard	4/5 stars
The Encyclopedia of Popular Music	4/5 stars

=== Contemporary reception ===
The album received a positive critical reception upon its release. Record World noted that "Vic makes a ripple of 'Star Dust' and a ball out of 'Like Someone in Love.'" The Cincinnati Enquirer enjoyed the "excellent choices for Vic's smooth phasing and warm vocal quality". Journal & Courier called it "one of his best efforts in years". The Memphis Press-Scimitar praised Damone for continuing in his "mini-Sinatra style, sleepily cooing the words".

=== Retrospective reviews ===
Retrospectives were also positive. Dave Nathan of Allmusic's stated that "Damone brings off steady performances of 11 tunes, some standards, but mostly contemporary material. That he can croon with the best is shown on 'Watch What Happens,' arranged by Billy Byers, and on 'Stardust.' But he is equally adroit on up-tempo tunes."

Both The Encyclopedia of Popular Music, and Billboard gave the album a four-star rating as well, while getting a lower three-star rating from AllMusic.

== Later rereleases ==
The album was released on compact disc by Collectables Records on January 21, 2003 as tracks 13 through 23 on a pairing of two albums on one CD with tracks 1 through 12 consisting of the other album being Damone Debut's RCA album from November 1966, Stay with Me. Collectables included this CD in a box set entitled Only the Best of Vic Damone, which contains six of his studio albums and one compilation and was released on November 27, 2007.

== Track listing ==
=== Side one ===
No.	Title	Writer(s)	Length
1.	"Why Can't I Walk Away" (From the Broadway musical Maggie Flynn)	Luigi Creatore, Hugo Peretti, George David Weiss	2:41
2.	"Watch What Happens" (From the 20th Century Fox Pictures: The Umbrellas of Cherbourg)	Norman Gimbel, Michel Legrand	2:31
3.	"If You Are But a Dream" (From the RKO Pictures: The House I Live In)	Nathan J. Bonx, Jack Fulton, Moe Jaffe	2:30
4.	"Stardust"	Hoagy Carmichael, Mitchell Parish	3:41
5.	"Like Someone in Love" (From the RKO Pictures: Belle of the Yukon)	Jimmy Van Heusen, Johnny Burke	2:46

=== Side two ===
No.	Title	Writer(s)	Length
1.	"When You've Laughed All Your Laughter"	Richard Loring, Dorothy Wayne	2:52
2.	"I Should Care" (From the Metro-Goldwyn-Mayer film Thrill of a Romance)	Axel Stordahl, Paul Weston, Sammy Cahn	3:05
3.	"Medley: The Glory of Love/Theme from Guess Who's Coming to Dinner"	Billy Hill, Frank De Vol	2:21
4.	"Take It from Me Girl"	Dorothy Wayne, Joseph Parnello	2:44
5.	"Nothing to Lose"	Henry Mancini, Don Black	2:16
6.	"Goin' Out of My Head"	Teddy Randazzo, Bobby Weinstein	3:12

== Charts ==
Chart peaks for singles from Why Can't I Walk Away
Single	Year	Chart	Peak position
"The Glory of Love"	1967	US Easy Listening (Billboard)	15
"Nothing to Lose"	1968	US Easy Listening (Billboard)	40
"Why Can't I Walk Away"	1968	US Easy Listening (Billboard)	21

== Personnel ==
All credits are adapted from the liner notes of Why Can't I Walk Away.

- Vic Damone – vocals
- J. Hill, (tracks: B3; B4; B5) – arranger, conductor
- Billy Byers, (tracks: A2; A3) – arranger
- Don Costa, (tracks: A2; A3) – conductor
- Joe Parnello, (tracks: B5; B6) – arranger, conductor
- Perry Botkin Jr., (tracks: A4; A5; B2) – arranger, conductor
- Jack Pleis, (tracks: A1; B1) – producer, arranger
- Neely Plumb – producer
- Ernie Altschuler – producer
- Hank Cicalo – recording engineer
- Pete Abbott – recording engineer
- Johnny Bradford – liner notes
