= My Baby Loves to Swing =

Studio album by Vic Damone
- Released: January 1963
- Genre: Traditional pop; vocal pop
- Length: 29:08
- Label: Capitol
- Producer: Jack Marshall

Vic Damone chronology
Young and Lively (1962)	My Baby Loves to Swing (1963)	The Liveliest (1963)

My Baby Loves to Swing is the seventeenth studio album by American singer Vic Damone. It was released by Capitol Records in January 1963, and was available both in stereo and mono sound. It was produced by Jack Marshall.

The albums contains mix of originals and covers of songs from the 1910s ("Baby Won't You Please Come Home", "My Melancholy Baby"), 1920s ("Everybody Loves My Baby"), 1930s ("You Must Have Been a Beautiful Baby", My Baby Just Cares for Me "), and 1940s ("Is You Is or Is You Ain't My Baby").

The album was released on compact disc by EMI Music Distribution in 1997 as a double album pairing it with Damone's 1962 debut with Capitol, Linger Awhile with Vic Damone.

== Reception ==
Professional ratings
Review scores
Source	Rating
AllMusic	3/5 stars
The Encyclopedia of Popular Music	4/5 stars
Disc	4/5 stars

AllMusic's Nick Dedina thought the album "finds a middle ground between the ones Nelson Riddle and Billy May crafted for Frank Sinatra and Nat King Cole, and Damone's smooth delivery contrasts nicely with Marshall's charts"

Billboard praised Damone "for using a variety of stylings (smooth ballads, bossa nova, blues) serenades with "Baby Won't You Please Come Home", "You Must Have Been a Beautiful Baby", "My Melancholy Baby", and other strong oldies".

Cashbox magazine stated that "the tunes are rendered in a variety of danceable rhythms including Bossa Nova, cha-cha and waltz."

Nigel Hunter of Disc noted that Damone "works through well-known standards ... and sings clearly with mellow tone and impeccable phrasing."

In A Biographical Guide to the Great Jazz and Pop Singers, Will Friedwald describes it as having "an odd (but not unappealing) military press roll and lots of modulations, ending with Damone socking in to a real high note. There are also two Cahn and Van Heusen originals, which sound like leftover from a Sinatra concept album."

Both The Encyclopedia of Popular Music and Disc gave the album four-star ratings, while getting a lower three-star rating from AllMusic.

== Track listing ==
=== Side one ===
No.	Title	Writer(s)	Length
1.	"I'm Nobody's Baby"	Milton Ager, Benny Davis, Lester Santly	2:15
2.	"Everybody Loves My Baby"	Jack Palmer, Spencer Williams	2:30
3.	"You Must Have Been a Beautiful Baby" (from the Warner Bros. film: Hard to Get)	Johnny Mercer, Harry Warren	1:46
4.	"Alright, Okay, You Win"	Sid Wyche, Sidney Wyche	2:24
5.	"My Melancholy Baby"	William Frawley, George A. Norton	2:22
6.	"Let's Sit This One Out"	Sammy Cahn, James Van Heusen	3:05

=== Side two ===
No.	Title	Writer(s)	Length
1.	"My Baby Loves to Swing"	Sammy Cahn, James Van Heusen	2:48
2.	"My Baby Just Cares for Me" (from the United Artists film: Whoopee!)	Walter Donaldson, Gus Kahn	2:09
3.	"Is You Is or Is You Ain't My Baby"	Louis Jordan, Billy Austin	2:13
4.	"Baby, Baby All the Time"	Bobby Troup	2:31
5.	"Baby Won't You Please Come Home"	Charles Warfield, Clarence Williams	1:56
6.	"Make This a Slow Goodbye"	Frank J. Myers, Jack Sher, Joe Sher	2:51
