= Percy Faith Plays Music from the Broadway Production My Fair Lady =

Studio album by Percy Faith & His Orchestra
- Released: 1956
- Genre: Easy listening
- Label: Columbia

Percy Faith Plays Music from the Broadway Production My Fair Lady is a 1956 album by Percy Faith & His Orchestra. It was released in 1956 by Columbia Records (catalog no. CL895). It features Faith and his orchestra playing music from Lerner and Lowe's My Fair Lady.

It debuted on the pop album chart on April 29, 1957, peaked at the No. 8 spot, and remained on the chart for two weeks.

== Track listing ==
Side A

1. "With A Little Bit Of Luck"
2. "Wouldn't It Be Loverly"
3. "I'm An Ordinary Man"
4. "The Rain In Spain"
5. "I Could Have Danced All Night"
6. "Embassy Waltz"

Side B

1. "Ascot Gavotte"
2. "On the Street Where You Live"
3. "Show Me"
4. "I've Grown Accustomed To Her Face"
5. "Get Me To The Church On Time"
