= The Moon of Manakoora =

Song written by Frank Loesser and Alfred Newman

"The Moon of Manakoora" is a popular song written by Frank Loesser (lyrics) and Alfred Newman (music) for the 1937 Paramount film The Hurricane starring Dorothy Lamour. Lamour sang the song in the film and also made a commercial recording of it. The song "The Moon of Manakoora" is considered a standard and was Loesser's first success as a lyric writer.

Manakoora, loosely translated to English, is "witchcraft", derived from "mana" meaning "magic" and "koora/kura" (pronounced "KUU-rah") meaning "lore" or "school" or "body of knowledge".

== Other recordings ==
The song has been covered by many other artists, including:

- The cast of TV series Glee
- Ambrose and His Orchestra
- Australian jazz vocalist Janet Seidel
- The Norman Luboff Choir
- Andy Williams (for his 1959 album To You Sweetheart, Aloha.)
- The Ames Brothers
- Chet Atkins
- Stanley Black
- Frankie Carle
- Benny Carter
- Frank Chacksfield
- Bing Crosby – The Crosby version was recorded on January 21, 1938, with John Scott Trotter and his Orchestra for Decca Records and reached the No. 10 position in the charts in 1938.
- Vic Damone (for his 1962 album Strange Enchantment)
- Eddie "Lockjaw" Davis
- Percy Faith
- Benny Goodman
- Burl Ives (for his 1965 album On the Beach at Waikiki)
- Harry James
- Kana King
- Andre Kostelanetz
- Gene Krupa
- Harry Leader
- Guy Lombardo
- Arthur Lyman
- Henry Mancini
- Tony Martin (with Ray Noble and his Orchestra. This recording reached the charts of the day and peaked in the No. 15 position.)
- Felix Mendelssohn’s Hawaiian Serenaders
- Buddy Merrill Orchestra
- Vaughn Monroe
- Alfred Newman
- Les Paul and Mary Ford
- Sonny Rollins
- Wayne Shorter
- The Ventures

The melody of the song appears in themes for the movies The Hurricane and Mr. Robinson Crusoe.
