= The Velvetones =

American doo-wop group

- Origin: Newark, New Jersey, United States
- Genres: Doo-wop
- Years active: 1943–1949
- Labels: Coronet, Sonora Records
- Past members: Enoch Martin; John Parks; Madison Flanagan; Muzzy George "Pop" Willie; Sam Rucker; Walter Dawkins

The Velvetones were an American doo-wop group formed in Newark, New Jersey, United States, in 1943. The founding members Madison Flanagan (tenor lead and maracas), Walter Dawkins (second tenor/baritone) and Sam Rucker (baritone and guitar) all attended High School together and formed the group alongside Enoch Martin (pianist, baritone lead). They signed with record label Coronet at some time in 1946 and produced such titles as "Sweet Lorraine" and "Jason, Get Your Basin".

Shortly after this the group left Coronet, and Walter Dawkins left and was replaced by "Pop" Willie as they signed with Sonora Records. The following year more changes came as Sam Rucker was replaced by John Parks and Muzzy George replaced "Pop" Willie. By 1949 demand for the band had disappeared and they called it quits.

== After break-up ==
Sam Rucker died in 1997 at the age of 73, Enoch Martin in 2002 at 80, and Madison Flanagan in 2017 at 95. The status of the other members is unknown.

== Songs ==
- Sweet Lorraine
- Jason, Get Your Basin
- The Glory of Love
