= On the Swingin' Side =

Studio album by Vic Damone
- Released: December 19, 1960
- Genres: Traditional pop, vocal pop, standards
- Length: 28:01
- Label: Columbia
- Producer: Jack Marshall

Vic Damone chronology
This Game of Love (1959)	On the Swingin' Side (1960)	Linger Awhile with Vic Damone (1961)

On the Swingin' Side is the twelfth studio album by American singer Vic Damone, released on December 19, 1960, by Columbia Records. The album was available both in stereo and mono sound. It was produced by Jack Marshall.

it contains a collection of standards of songs from the 1920s ("When My Sugar Walks Down the Street", 1930s ("Home (When Shadows Fall)", "Falling in Love with Love"), 1940s ("Speak Low"), and 1950s ("Cry Me a River", It's All Right with Me).

The album was released on compact disc by EMI Music Distribution in 2000, as tracks 13 through 24 on a pairing of two albums on one CD with tracks 1 through 12 consisting of Damone's 1956 Columbia debut, That Towering Feeling!. It was also released on compact disc by Sony Music Distribution on February 23, 1999, as tracks 13 through 24 on a pairing of two albums on one CD with tracks 1 through 12 consisting of Damone's 1958 album, Angela Mia. Collectables included this CD in a box set entitled Only the Best of Vic Damone, which contains six of his studio albums and one compilation and was released on November 27, 2007.

On the Swingin' Side was included in a box set entitled Seven Classic Albums Box Set, which contains all 7 of his studio albums, and was released on February 5, 2016.

== Reception ==
Professional ratings
Review scores
Source	Rating
AllMusic	4.5/5 stars
The Encyclopedia of Popular Music	3/5 stars
Billboard	4/5 stars
Disc	4/5 stars
New Record Mirror	5/5 stars

William Ruhlmann of AllMusic said that On the Swingin' Side "is an unadulterated up-tempo delight that deserves to be rediscovered."

Giving it four stars to indicate "strong sales potential", Billboard notes: "He Lends his superior vocal talents to a flock of great standards - eschewing his usual sweet ballad groove in favor of a swinging beat. It's a highly effective change of pace for the warbler and fine wax for jocks."

Cash Box claimed that "Jack Marshall's arrangement keep the pace on the easy swing side, sympathetic to the singer's style". Jimmy Watson of New Record Mirror described the album as "One of Vic's Best to date" and noted that "The album swings easily along from start to finish."

Nigel Hunter of Disc believed that the "presentation has been brought right to date by high-class arranging and accompaniments from Jack Marshall." In A Biographical Guide to the Great Jazz and Pop Singers, Will Friedwald writes "He knows his own strengths and weakness enough to stick to doing ballads with a beat, as opposed to out and up-tempo singing in the Sinatra Swingin' Lover tradition." The Encyclopedia of Popular Music described the album as "well-regarded", giving it a three-star rating as well, meaning that they believed that album was "Good by the artist's usual standrands, ane therefore recommended.

== Track listing ==
=== Side one ===
No.	Title	Writer(s)	Length
1.	"Falling in Love with Love" (from the Broadway musical: The Boys from Syracuse)	Richard Rodgers, Lorenz Hart	1:37
2.	"It's All Right with Me"	Cole Porter	2:56
3.	"When My Sugar Walks Down the Street"	Gene Austin, Jimmy McHugh, Irving Mills	2:51
4.	"Cry Me a River"	Arthur Hamilton	3:12
5.	"Home (When Shadows Fall)"	Harry Clarkson, Geoffrey Clarkson, Peter van Steeden	1:57
6.	"Swingin' Down the Lane"	Isham Jones, Gus Kahn	2:19

=== Side two ===
No.	Title	Writer(s)	Length
1.	"I Cried for You"	Gus Arnheim, Abe Lyman, Arthur Freed	2:19
2.	"Speak Low"	Kurt Weill, Ogden Nash	2:19
3.	"It's a Wonderful World"	Jan Savitt, Jan Savitt, Johnny Watson	1:49
4.	"Girl of My Dreams (I Love You)"	Sunny Clapp	2:21
5.	"Deep Purple"	Peter DeRose, Mitchell Parish	2:09
6.	"Toot, Toot, Tootsie (Goo' Bye!)"	Gus Kahn, Ernie Erdman, Danny Russo	2:01
