= You Were Only Fooling =

Studio album by Vic Damone
- Released: June 1965
- Genre: Traditional pop, vocal pop
- Length: 30:43
- Label: Warner
- Producer: Jimmy Bowen

Vic Damone chronology
On the Street Where You Live (1964)	You Were Only Fooling (1965)	Country Love Songs (1965)

Singles from You Were Only Fooling
- 1. "For Mama (La Mamma)" Released: February 1965; 2. "You Were Only Fooling" Released: April 1965; 3. "Why Don't You Believe Me?" Released: July 1965

You Were Only Fooling is the nineteenth studio album by American singer Vic Damone, released in June 1965, by Warner Records, and was available both in stereo and mono. This was his first project after leaving Capitol Records. It was produced by Jimmy Bowen.

The album was released on compact disc by Collectables Records on August 12, 2003, as a double album pairing it with Damone's album, Country Love Songs.

== Reception ==
Professional ratings
Review scores
Source	Rating
AllMusic	4.5/5 stars
Record Mirror	3/5 stars
The Encyclopedia of Popular Music	2/5 stars

The album was well received by critics at the time of its release. Billboard Magazine stated that Damone "is in fine voice" and called the album "the most commercial LP of his career".

Cash Box called it "List of Veteran favorites" stating "When it comes to smooth, easy vocalizing and a warm, honest handling of a tender balled"

Record World noted that it was a "beautifully put together album with each song getting careful attention" and praised his cover version of "...and Roses and Roses".

The Honolulu Advertiser stated that "The rest of the kit [has] such clicks as "It's Not Unusual," "I'll Never Find Another You," "For Mama" is superb!"

Variety said it "showcases Damone in a neat songalog," adding that it consisted mostly of recent ballads.

The San Francisco Examiner stated that "He shows his versatility here by restyling the old timer, "Careless Hands." One of the best arrangements is "And Roses and Roses," on which "Da Moan" does extra well."

Record Mirror called the album "Pleasant enough set from the strangely-underrated talent," and stated that Damone has a "highly professional gloss to his work," and that "Erine Freeman's backing aggregations help greatly.

== Chart performance ==
The album debuted on Billboard magazine's Top LP's chart in the issue dated July 10, 1965, and remained on the chart for ten weeks, peaking at number 86. It debuted on the Cashbox albums chart in the issue dated July 17, 1965, and remained on the chart for a total of five weeks, peaking at number 91. It debuted on the Record World 100 Top LP's chart in the issue dated July 24, 1965, and remained on the chart for a total of five weeks, peaking at number 80. The album was not considered a success, either aesthetically or at the cashbox.

=== Singles ===
"You Were Only Fooling" debuted on the Billboard Hot 100 in the issue dated April 17, 1965, eventually reaching number 30 during a ten-week stay on the chart. The song reached number eight on the magazine's Easy Listening chart., and number 28 on the Cashbox singles chart. It would eventually reach the same position on the Record World 100 Top Pops chart. The song marked his last of 40 hits on the Hot 100.

The single, "Why Don't You Believe Me?", bubbled under Billboard's Hot 100 chart, reaching number 127, and peaked at number 25 on the magazine's Easy Listening chart. It would also reach number 90 on the Cashbox singles charts and number 103 on Record World.

== Track listing ==
=== Side one ===
No.	Title	Writer(s)	Length
1.	"You Were Only Fooling"	Billy Faier, Larry Fotine, Fred Meadows	2:34
2.	"I'll Never Find Another You"	Tom Springfield	2:47
3.	"The Thrill of Lovin' You"	Sam M. Lewis, Ben Weisman	2:28
4.	"Stranger in the World"	Howard Greenfield, Jack Keller	2:44
5.	"For Mama (La Mamma)"	Charles Aznavour, Don Black, Robert Gall	3:12
6.	"It's Not Unusual"	Les Reed, Gordon Mills	2:28

=== Side two ===
No.	Title	Writer(s)	Length
1.	"...and Roses and Roses"	Ray Gilbert, Dorival Caymmi	2:28
2.	"Why Don't You Believe Me?"	Lew Douglas, King Laney, Roy Rodde	2:30
3.	"Please Help Me, I'm Falling"	Don Robertson. Hal Blair	2:05
4.	"Careless Hands"	Carl Sigman, Bob Hilliard	2:36
5.	"I've Been Lookin'"	Sonny Curtis	2:16
6.	"Dream on Little Dreamer"	Fred Burch, Jan Crutchfield	2:31

== Charts ==
Album

Chart (1965)	Peak position
US Billboard Top LPs	86
US Cashbox Top 100 Albums	91
US Record World 100 Top LPs	80

Singles

Year	Single	Chart	Peak position
1965	"You Were Only Fooling"	US Billboard Hot 100	30
1965	"You Were Only Fooling"	US Easy Listening	8
1965	"You Were Only Fooling"	US Cashbox	28
1965	"You Were Only Fooling"	US Record World	28
1965	"Why Don't You Believe Me?"	US Billboard Hot 100	127
1965	"Why Don't You Believe Me?"	US Easy Listening	25
1965	"Why Don't You Believe Me?"	US Cashbox	90
1965	"Why Don't You Believe Me?"	US Record World	103
