= On the South Side of Chicago =

Studio album by Vic Damone
- Released: May 1967
- Genre: Traditional pop; vocal pop
- Length: 24:44
- Label: RCA
- Producer: Neely Plumb; Nick Perito

Vic Damone chronology
Stay with Me (1966)	On the South Side of Chicago (1967)	The Damone Type of Thing (1967)

Singles from On the South Side of Chicago
- 1. "On The South Side Of Chicago" Released: March 1967; 2. "It Makes No Difference" Released: August 1967

On The South Side of Chicago is the twenty-second studio album by American singer Vic Damone released in May 1967, by RCA Records, and was available both in stereo and mono. It was produced by Neely Plumb and Nick Perito and arranged and conducted by Don Costa, Perry Botkin Jr., and Ernie Freeman.

The album features the singles "On the South Side of Chicago" and "It Makes No Difference". It also contains some foreign songs, British spy movies songs, and a mix of covers of old and recent hits that included one song that also had chart success in 1966 via Dusty Springfield: "You Don't Have to Say You Love Me".

== Chart performance ==
The single, "On The South Side of Chicago", debuted in the issue dated April 1, 1967 on the magazine's Easy Listening chart peaked at number 22 during a seven-week stay.

"It Makes No Difference" debuted on the Billboard Easy Listening chart in the issue dated August 12, 1967, did even better eventually reaching number 12 during a seven-week stay on the chart.

== Reception ==
Professional ratings
Review scores
Source	Rating
AllMusic	2/5 stars
The Encyclopedia of Popular Music	4/5 stars

Billboard mentions that "Most of the material from musicals too well known, selected for Damone's Effortless style".

Cash Box praised Damone for his "clarity and precision of phrasing ...[and] rich, versatile baritone".

In A Biographical Guide to the Great Jazz and Pop Singers, Will Friedwald called it "mostly junk".

Arizona Daily Star noted that Damone "does everything from the current swingers to the blues".

The Daily Oklahoman describes the album as "top performers in the business as one of the finest vocalists extant".

Fort Worth Star-Telegram stated that "Damone does everything from 'A Quiet Tear' a song with a Latin feel to 'You've Never Kissed Her' and 'Ciao Compare'."

Journal & Courier describes the album as "some of his finest work" and notes that "Not only is Damone in excellent voice but the musical backing is some of the finest ever had One or the best items".

== Track listing ==
=== Side one ===
No.	Title	Writer(s)	Length
1.	"It Makes No Difference"	Bert Kaempfert, Herbert Rehbein, Milt Gabler	2:25
2.	"A Quiet Tear"	Ben Raleigh, Herb Alpert	2:46
3.	"Ciao Compare"	Bob Merrill	1:56
4.	"I'll Sleep Tonight"	Fred Tobias, Stanley Lebowsky	1:50
5.	"You've Never Kissed Her"	Robert Merrill	3:07

=== Side two ===
No.	Title	Writer(s)	Length
1.	"On The South Side Of Chicago"	Phil Zeller	2:16
2.	"What Is a Woman?"	Harvey Schmidt, Tom Jones	2:41
3.	"Love Me Longer (Francesca's Theme)"	Earl Shuman, Dennis Farnon	2:31
4.	"Stay (Reste)"	Charles Aznavour, Ruth Batchelor	2:12
5.	"You Don't Have to Say You Love Me"	Vicki Wickham, Simon Napier-Bell, Pino Donaggio, Vito Pallavicini	2:53

== Charts ==
Chart peaks for singles from On the South Side of Chicago
Single	Year	Chart	Peak positions
"On The South Side of Chicago"	1967	US Easy Listening (Billboard)	22
"It Makes No Difference"	1967	US Easy Listening (Billboard)	12
