= Strange Enchantment =

1962 studio album by Vic Damone

Studio album by Vic Damone
- Released: March 1962
- Genre: Traditional pop; vocal pop
- Length: 29:59
- Label: Capitol
- Producer: Jack Marshall

Vic Damone chronology
Linger Awhile with Vic Damone (1961)	Strange Enchantment (1962)	The Lively Ones (1962)

Strange Enchantment is the fourteenth studio album by American singer Vic Damone, released by Capitol Records in March 1962, and was available both in stereo and mono. It was produced by Jack Marshall.

The albums contains mix of originals and covers of songs from the 1920s ("Hawaiian Wedding Song"), 1930s ("Poinciana", The Moon of Manakoora "), 1940s ("Shangri-La", "Flamingo"), and 1950s ("Ebb Tide").

The album was released on compact disc by EMI Music Distribution on May 31, 1999, as a double album pairing it with Damone's 1962 album, The Lively Ones. Strange Enchantment was included in a box set entitled Seven Classic Albums Box Set, which contains all 7 of his studio albums, and was released on February 5, 2016.

== Reception ==
Professional ratings
Review scores
Source	Rating
AllMusic	3/5 stars
New Record Mirror	3/5 stars
The Encyclopedia of Popular Music	3/5 stars
Billboard	4/5 stars
Disc	4/5 stars

Giving it four stars to indicate "strong sales potential", Billboard stated that "Here's the rich-voiced Vic Damone in a selection of moody, haunting, far-away type songs, an exotic set full of the percussion and flavor of the islands.

Cash Box called it "a powerful follow-up LP," and stated that "a dozen tropical-flavored tunes, in good strad as he offers extremely listenable renditions of 'Poinicana', 'Beyond The Reef' and 'Ebb Tide.'"

Record Mirror raved, "The cool and thoroughly professional voice of Vic Damone wend its way easily through this ballad set."

Hunter Nigel of Disc noted that "He moves between Hawaii and Latin America with able assistance from Billy May's orchestra."

In A Biographical Guide to the Great Jazz and Pop Singers, Will Friedwald called it "the most ballady of the bunch is the exotic."

American Record Guide referred to it as "a pleasant album."

The Courier Journal stated that "He illustrates with an excellent program of South Seas songs that he is long overdue for a hit. He is backed by strings and percussions conducted by Billy May."

Life claimed "it offers a pleasant Polynesian numbers like 'Bali Hai'".

== Track listing ==
=== Side one ===
No.	Title	Writer(s)	Length
1.	"Strange Enchantment"	Frank Loesser, Frederick Hollander	2:49
2.	"Hawaiian Wedding Song"	Al Hoffman, Charles E. King, Dick Manning	2:41
3.	"Shangri-La"	Matty Malneck, Carl Sigman, Robert Maxwell	2:42
4.	"Humming Waters"	Al Stillman, Guy Wood	2:47
5.	"Poinciana"	Nat Simon, Buddy Bernier, Manuel Lliso	2:27
6.	"Flamingo"	Ted Grouya, Edmund Anderson	1:59

=== Side two ===
No.	Title	Writer(s)	Length
1.	"Beyond the Reef"	Jack Pitman	2:26
2.	"You're Lovable"	Ian Bernard, Vic Damone	2:37
3.	"The Moon of Manakoora"	Frank Loesser, Alfred Newman	2:12
4.	"Bali Ha'i"	Richard Rodgers, Oscar Hammerstein II	2:07
5.	"Dry Your Eyes"	Charles King, Milt Raskin	2:21
6.	"Ebb Tide"	Carl Sigman, Robert Maxwell	2:38
