= The Liveliest at the Basin Street East =

Live album by Vic Damone
- Released: July 1963
- Venues: Basin Street East, New York City, New York
- Genres: Traditional pop; vocal pop
- Length: 35:28
- Label: Capitol
- Producer: Jack Marshall

Vic Damone chronology
| My Baby Loves to Swing (1963) | The Liveliest at the Basin Street East (1963) | On the Street Where You Live (1964) |

The Liveliest at the Basin Street East is a live album by American singer Vic Damone, released in July 1963 by Capitol Records. It was available both in stereo and mono.

It was taped live at Basin Street East in New York City, with a band conducted by Joe Parnello. It was produced by Jack Marshall. The album contains performances of songs that he had previously recorded for singles and albums during his time with the Columbia, and Capitol labels including "What Kind of Fool Am I?", and his big hit from 1956 "On the Street Where You Live" as well as one he had never or would record in the future including -- "You're Nobody till Somebody Loves You", "When Your Lover Has Gone", "Adios" and "Fascinating Rhythm".

The album was released on compact disc by EMI Music Distribution on December 9, 2003 as a double album pairing it with Damone's 1964 Capitol Album, On the Street Where You Live.

== Reception ==
Professional ratings
Review scores
| Source | Rating |
|---|---|
| New Record Mirror | 3/5 stars |
| The Encyclopedia of Popular Music | 3/5 stars |

Billboard praised Damone for his "excitment live performance and arrangement go right along with the top-notch Damone Performances".

Cash Box called it "dynamically showcased" stated that he "has never been better and the big band backing is a perfect complement to his big, warm voice."

Record Mirror noted: "You will find his efforts here of his usual high standard."

American Record Guide believed that "He manages to combine entertainment with sound musical taste."

The Toronto Star stated, "Damone is no simple copy of Sinatra But his general aims are similar When the tune is upbeat he swings."

The San Francisco Examiner called it "One of the most pleasant" and stated that "[Damone] is part vocalist and part actor and the stimulation of a live audience enhances his performance."

The Charlotte News called it "warm smooth and sometimes swinging" and stated that "[Damone] shows the style he has shown in night clubs."

Journal & Courier noted, "He swings and really belts some of the songs and the night."

Both The Encyclopedia of Popular Music and Record Mirror gave the album a three-star ratings.

== Track listing ==
Side one
| No. | Title | Writer(s) | Length |
|---|---|---|---|
| 1. | "You and the Night and the Music" (from the Broadway musical Revenge with Music) | Arthur Schwartz, Howard Dietz | 2:01 |
| 2. | "When Your Lover Has Gone" (from Warner Bros. Pictures' Blonde Crazy) | Einar Aaron Swan | 3:35 |
| 3. | "What Kind of Fool Am I?" (from the Broadway musical Stop the World – I Want to Get Off) | Leslie Bricusse, Anthony Newley | 3:53 |
| 4. | "At Long Last Love" (from the Broadway musical You Never Know) | Cole Porter | 2:18 |
| 5. | "Fascinating Rhythm" | George Gershwin, Ira Gershwin | 2:12 |
| 6. | "They Can't Take That Away from Me" (from RKO Pictures' Shall We Dance) | George Gershwin, Ira Gershwin | 2:15 |

Side two
| No. | Title | Writer(s) | Length |
|---|---|---|---|
| 1. | "The Most Beautiful Girl in the World" (from the Broadway musical Jumbo) | Richard Rodgers, Lorenz Hart | 3:00 |
| 2. | "Adios" | Enric Madriguera | 3:27 |
| 3. | "I Left My Heart in San Francisco" | George C. Cory Jr., Douglass Cross | 2:35 |
| 4. | "A Lot of Livin' to Do" (from the Broadway musical Bye Bye Birdie) | Charles Strouse, Lee Adams | 3:00 |
| 5. | "You're Nobody till Somebody Loves You" | Russ Morgan, Larry Stock, James Cavanaugh | 3:11 |
| 6. | "On the Street Where You Live" (from the Broadway musical My Fair Lady) | Frederick Loewe, Alan Jay Lerner | 3:26 |
