= Glory of Love =

Glory of Love may refer to:

== Music ==
- Glory of Love (album), 1968 studio album by Herbie Mann
- "Glory of Love" (Peter Cetera song), 1986
- The Glory of Love, 1969 album of cover songs by Eddy Arnold
- "Glory of Love" (The Armoury Show song), 1985
- "The Glory of Love" (Benny Goodman song), 1936, covered by multiple artists

== Literature ==
- The Glory of Love, story by Leslie Beresford on which the 1923 film While Paris Sleeps was based

== See also ==
- Alive with the Glory of Love, a single from Say Anything from their 2006 album ...Is a Real Boy
