= Angela Mia =

Studio album by Vic Damone
- Released: February 1958
- Genres: Traditional pop, vocal pop, standards
- Length: 42:46
- Label: Columbia
- Producer: Frank De Vol

Vic Damone chronology
That Towering Feeling! (1958)	Angela Mia (1958)	Closer Than a Kiss (1958)

Angela Mia is the ninth studio album by American singer Vic Damone, released in February 1958 by Columbia Records, and was available both in stereo and mono. It was produced by Glenn Osser.

It features a collection of songs like "(Oh, My Wonderful One) Tell Me You're Mine", "Arrivederci, Roma", and "Tell Me That You Love Me", including his two big hit "I Have But One Heart", and "You're Breaking My Heart", which originally recorded two songs, in 1947, & 1949 while he was signed to Mercury Records.

The album was released on compact disc by Sony Music Distribution on February 23, 1999, as tracks 1 through 12 on a pairing of two albums on one CD with tracks 13 through 24 consisting of Damone's 1960 album, On the Swingin' Side.

Angela Mia was included in a box set entitled Seven Classic Albums Box Set, which contains all 7 of his studio albums, and was released on February 5, 2016.

== Reception ==
Professional ratings
Review scores
Source	Rating
AllMusic	3/5 stars
The Encyclopedia of Popular Music	3/5 stars
Billboard	4/5 stars

Nick Dedina of AllMusic noted "Damone has a gorgeous voice, a true feeling for Italian standards, and while he comes from the same American mean streets that produced Dean Martin and Frank Sinatra, he projects the kind of country-club cool that Boston bluebloods have to go to prep school to learn. Damone doesn't possess Dino's easy good humor or goofy charisma on these Italian standards, but he's got great pipes and an intimate, romantic feeling for the material. With Angela Mia, Damone creates a Technicolor Hollywood version of Italy brimming over with eternal summers, factory-produced lunchmeats, and the promise of statuesque sex goddesses."

Giving it four stars to indicate "strong sales potential", Billboard described the album as a "romantic package" and notes "Damone warbles wamtty on a group of Mediterranean tunes - 'Arriverderci, Roma', 'Just Say I Love Her', 'You're Breaking My Heart' (his first big singles hit), etc."

Cashbox believed the album is "Attractive stylings" and noted "Although the collection is rendered mainly in English, the vocalist smoothly captures the intimate essence of the tender items."

Variety notes that "Damone delivers in an easy style, at home both in the English and Italian lyrics. Glenn Osser backs up appropriately with fiddles and accordions". On the other hand, The Encyclopedia of Popular Music gave the album a three-star rating only, meaning that they believed that album was "Good by the artist's usual standrands, ane therefore recommended."

== Track listing ==
=== Side one ===
No.	Title	Writer(s)	Length
1.	"Angela Mia (My Angel)"	Ernö Rapée, Lew Pollack	3:28
2.	"Tell Me You're Mine"	Charlie Bertini, Ronnie Gaylord, Dico Vasin	2:08
3.	"Arrivederci Roma" (from the Metro-Goldwyn-Mayer film: Seven Hills of Rome)	Pietro Garinei, Sandro Giovannini, Carl Sigman	3:34
4.	"Just Say I Love Her"	Rodolfo Falvo, Jack Val, Jimmy Dale, Enzo Fusco, Martin Kalmanoff, Sam Ward	4:01
5.	"Non Dimenticar" (from the Lux Film: Anna)	P. G. Redi (Gino Redi, a.k.a. Luigi Pulci), Michele Galdieri, Shelley Dobbins	2:03
6.	"'O sole mio"	Eduardo di Capua, Alfredo Mazzucchi, Giovanni Capurro	4:03

=== Side two ===
No.	Title	Writer(s)	Length
1.	"You're Breaking My Heart"	Pat Genaro, Sunny Skylar, Ruggero Leoncavallo	3:26
2.	"Serenade in the Light"	Andrea Bixio, Bruno Cherubini, Jimmy Kennedy	3:43
3.	"Luna Rossa"		4:08
4.	"I Have But One Heart"	Johnny Farrow, Marty Symes	3:16
5.	"With All My Heart and Soul"	Salve D'Esposito, Tito Manlio. Manny Curtis, Harry Akst	3:07
6.	"Tell Me That You Love Me"	Al Stillman	3:07
