= Stay with Me (Vic Damone album) =

1966 studio album by Vic Damone

Studio album by Vic Damone
- Released: November 1966
- Genre: Traditional pop; vocal pop
- Length: 32:45
- Label: RCA
- Producer: Neely Plumb

Vic Damone chronology
| Country Love Songs (1965) | Stay with Me (1966) | On the South Side of Chicago (1967) |

Stay with Me is the twenty-first studio album by American singer Vic Damone, released by RCA Records in November 1966, and was available both in stereo and mono. This was his first project after leaving Warner Records. It was produced by Neely Plumb and arranged and conducted by Ernie Freeman.

The album was released on compact disc by Collectables Records on January 21, 2003, as tracks 1 through 12 on a pairing of two albums on one CD with tracks 13 through 23 consisting Damone's last RCA album, Why Can't I Walk Away. Collectables included this CD in a box set entitled Only the Best of Vic Damone, which contains six of his studio albums and one compilation and was released on November 27, 2007.

== Reception ==
Professional ratings
Review scores
| Source | Rating |
|---|---|
| AllMusic | 3/5 stars |
| The Encyclopedia of Popular Music | 4/5 stars |

AllMusic's John Bush wrote that "All of the choices are obvious ones -- "How Insensitive," "Quiet Nights of Quiet Stars," "Meditation," "The Girl From Ipanema," "Once I Loved," and the non-Jobim "Pretty Butterfly", and that "Damone's is one of the voices most suited to these soft-toned songs and copacetic charts."

Billboard stated that "Ernie Freeman's smooth arrangements let Vic Damone caress the lyrics and the result is an outstanding album."

Cash Box said "The Brazilian tunes, such as "Meditation" and "The Girl From Ipanema", and the movie music are set to a bossa beat", predicting that "This package should move well among the artist's fans."

Variety stated "Damone's smooth flexible pipes projects the Latin repertoire with a relaxed swinging rhythm."

Record World notes Damone "sings here a dozen tunes bossa-fied and listeners will swoon."

The Portland Press Herald stated that the album's "fluid style swings gently through bossa nova touched songs such as "The Girl from Ipanema" and Nights of Quiet Stars."

The Daily Oklahoman stated that Damone "devotes his considerable talent to a gently swinging bossa nova and Ernie Freeman's great arrangements are distinctive."

== Track listing ==
=== Side one ===
| No. | Title | Writer(s) | Length |
|---|---|---|---|
| 1. | "Pretty Butterfly" ("No Balanço do Jequibáu") | Mario Albanese, Loryn Deane, Ciro Pereira, Sunny Skylar | 2:17 |
| 2. | "Meditation" ("Meditação") | Antônio Carlos Jobim, Newton Mendonça. Norman Gimbel | 2:48 |
| 3. | "Once I Loved" ("O Amor Em Paz") | Antônio Carlos Jobim, Vinícius de Moraes, Ray Gilbert | 2:41 |
| 4. | "How Insensitive" ("Insensatez") | Antônio Carlos Jobim, Vinícius de Moraes, Norman Gimbel | 3:08 |
| 5. | "The Girl from Ipanema" ("Garota de Ipanema") | Antônio Carlos Jobim, Vinícius de Moraes, Norman Gimbel | 2:19 |
| 6. | "You Are" | Samuel Prager, John Gary | 3:22 |

=== Side two ===
| No. | Title | Writer(s) | Length |
|---|---|---|---|
| 1. | "Stay with Me (Just Stay with Me)" (from the Columbia Pictures: Walk, Don't Run) | Quincy Jones, Peggy Lee | 2:44 |
| 2. | "Someone to Light Up My Life" ("Se Todos Fossem Iguais A Você" (From The Broadway Musical: Orfeu da Conceição) | Antônio Carlos Jobim, Vinícius de Moraes | 2:46 |
| 3. | "Quiet Nights of Quiet Stars" ("Corcovado") | Antonio Carlos Jobim, Gene Lees | 2:40 |
| 4. | "The Shadow of Your Smile" (from the Metro Goldwyn Mayer film The Sandpiper) | Johnny Mandel, Paul Francis Webster | 2:45 |
| 5. | "The Shining Sea" (from the United Artists film The Russians Are Coming, the Russians Are Coming) | Johnny Mandel, Peggy Lee | 2:42 |
| 6. | "A Time for Love" (from Warner Bros. Pictures: An American Dream) | Johnny Mandel, Paul Francis Webster | 2:29 |
