= Jack Palmer (composer) =

American pianist and composer (1899–1976)

Jack Palmer (May 29, 1899 – March 17, 1976) was an American pianist and composer. He is best known for co-writing two jazz standards with Spencer Williams: "Everybody Loves My Baby" and "I've Found a New Baby".

Born in Nashville, Tennessee, Palmer worked on New York City's Tin Pan Alley as a staff writer and wrote songs with many different co-authors. With Cab Calloway he wrote two film soundtrack hits, "Jumpin' Jive" (1939) and "Boog It" (1940).
