= The Lively Ones (album) =

Studio album by Vic Damone
- Released: August 1962
- Genre: Traditional pop; vocal pop
- Length: 26:53
- Label: Capitol
- Producer: Jack Marshall

Vic Damone chronology
Strange Enchantment (1962)	The Lively Ones (1962)	Young and Lively (1962)

The Lively Ones is the fifteenth studio album by American singer Vic Damone, released in August 1962 by Capitol Records, to coincide with the NBC special of the same series, which aired from the summers of 1962 and 1963. It showcased current jazz, pop, and folk performers, as well as comedians. It was produced by Jack Marshall.

The album was available both in stereo and mono. It contains tracks such as "Ruby" (which he also recorded for Mercury Records in 1947), "Marie", and two of Erno Rapee's 1920s movie waltzes, "Charmanine' and "Diane". He reportedly recorded the only crooner version of "Cherokee" as well.

The album was released on compact disc by EMI Music Distribution on May 31, 1999, as a double album paired with Damone's other album from 1962, Strange Enchantment. The Lively Ones was included in a box set entitled Seven Classic Albums Box Set, which contains all 7 of his studio albums, and was released on February 5, 2016.

== Reception ==
Professional ratings
Review scores
Source	Rating
AllMusic	4.5/5 stars
New Record Mirror	4/5 stars
The Encyclopedia of Popular Music	4/5 stars

The album was well-received by critics at the time of its release. Billboard praised Damone for "his tender, effortless style, over solid support from the swinging Billy May crew". American Record Guide referred to it as "an equally pleasant album." Cash Box called it "powerful merchandise".

New Record Mirror called it "an outstanding LP" and stated that "the swingier of the two, arrangements by Jack Marshall and Billy May, with orchestra conducted by that latter gent, tend to hold the listener's attention more than the singer of the up-tempo items." The Evening Independent called it "outstanding" and stated that Damone "sings a carefully selected group of standards." Hartford Courant mentions, "Billy May's orchestra does a basher on a mambo-fashioned 'Dearly Beloved' to complement swinging vocalist Damone, and 'I Want a Little Girl.' 'Laura' and 'Ruby' get traditional slow treatment."

Both The Encyclopedia of Popular Music and New Record Mirror gave the album four-star ratings. AllMusic gave it a four and a half star out of five rating.

== Chart performance ==
The album debuted on Billboard magazine's Top LP's chart in the issue dated October 13, 1962, remaining on the chart for 10 weeks, and peaking at number 57. This marked his second charting Capitol album, following Linger Awhile with Vic Damone earlier in the year.

== Track listing ==
=== Side one ===
No.	Title	Writer(s)	Length
1.	"Charmaine"	Ernö Rapée, Lew Pollack	2:06
2.	"Cherokee"	Ray Noble	1:48
3.	"Laura"	David Raksin, Johnny Mercer	2:23
4.	"Diane"	Ernö Rapée, Lew Pollack	2:16
5.	"Nina Never Knew"	Louis Alter, Milton Drake	2:47
6.	"The Lively Ones"	Jack Wohl, Sidney Woloshin	1:41

=== Side two ===
No.	Title	Writer(s)	Length
1.	"Marie"	Irving Berlin	2:01
2.	"The Most Beautiful Girl in the World" (from the Broadway musical: Jumbo)	Richard Rodgers, Lorenz Hart	2:09
3.	"Ruby" (from the 20th Century Fox film: Ruby Gentry)	Mitchell Parish. Heinz Roemheld	2:49
4.	"Dearly Beloved" (from the Columbia Pictures film: You Were Never Lovelier)	Johnny Mercer, Jerome Kern	2:12
5.	"I Want a Girl"	Harry Von Tilzer, William Dillon	2:30
6.	"Little Girl"	Madeline Hyde, Francis Henry	2:04

== Charts ==
Chart (1962)	Peak position
US Billboard Top LPs	57
