= Linger Awhile with Vic Damone =

Studio album by Vic Damone
- Released: December 1961
- Genres: Traditional pop; vocal pop
- Length: 28:36
- Label: Capitol
- Producer: Jack Marshall

Vic Damone chronology
On the Swingin' Side (1960)	Linger Awhile with Vic Damone (1961)	Strange Enchantment (1962)

Linger Awhile with Vic Damone is the thirteenth studio album by American singer Vic Damone. It was released in December 1961 by Capitol Records, and was available both in stereo and mono sound. Produced by Jack Marshall, this was Damone's first project after leaving Columbia Records.

The album debuted on the Billboard Top LP's chart in the issue dated March 3, 1962, and remained on the chart for 19 weeks, peaking at number 64. It also entered the Cashbox albums chart in the issue dated March 3, 1962, and remained on the chart for a total of 14 weeks, peaking at number 31.

The album was released on compact disc by EMI Music Distribution in 1997, as tracks 1 through 12 on a pairing of two albums on one CD with tracks 13 through 24 consisting of Damone's 1963 album, My Baby Loves to Swing. Linger Awhile with Vic Damone was included in a box set entitled Seven Classic Albums Box Set, which contains all 7 of his studio albums, and was released on February 5, 2016.

== Reception ==
Professional ratings
Review scores
Source	Rating
AllMusic	4/5 stars
The Encyclopedia of Popular Music	4/5 stars
Billboard	4/5 stars

Nick Dedina of AllMusic described the album as "one of his best," and noted that "Damone's voice is as beautiful as ever and he finds a nice balance between intimate romance and winking good humor though he throws in plenty of jazz guitar and lets listeners know that the album is really geared toward amorous conquests and romantic evenings at home."

Giving it four stars to indicate "strong sales potential", Billboard noted that "The set swings politely throughout most of the album in an adult dance tempo groove."

Cashbox states that Damone is "demonstrating maturity" with the release and that he "delivers a top-notch of sturdies."

Variety described the album as "a good LP", noted Damone "been placed in a soft, swinging mood here and with the help of Jack Marshall's Orch[estra] comes through with enough vocal kicks."

The Encyclopedia of Popular Music described the album as "well-regarded" and gave it a four-star rating as well, which meant that the album was classified as "outstanding". It received the same rating from AllMusic.

== Track listing ==
=== Side one ===
No.	Title	Writer(s)	Length
1.	"Linger Awhile"	Harry Owens, Vincent Rose	1:59
2.	"Soft Lights and Sweet Music" (from the British Lion Films picture: Soft Lights and Sweet Music)	Irving Berlin	2:08
3.	"Close Your Eyes"	Bernice Petkere	2:09
4.	"Deep Night"	Charles E. Henderson, Rudy Vallée	2:59
5.	"Stella by Starlight" (from the Paramount Pictures film: The Uninvited)	Ned Washington, Victor Young	2:03
6.	"One Love"	Leo Robin, Vincent Rose	2:07

=== Side two ===
No.	Title	Writer(s)	Length
1.	"Let's Face the Music and Dance" (from the RKO Pictures film: Follow the Fleet)	Irving Berlin	2:25
2.	"After the Lights Go Down Low"	Leroy Lovett, Alan White	2:24
3.	"Change Partners" (from the RKO Pictures film: Carefree)	Irving Berlin	1:28
4.	"There! I've Said It Again"	Redd Evans, David Mann	3:04
5.	"In the Still of the Night" (from the Metro-Goldwyn-Mayer film: Rosalie)	Cole Porter	2:24
6.	"When Lights Are Low"	Benny Carter, Spencer Williams	2:21

== Charts ==
Chart (1962)	Peak position
US Billboard Top LP's	64
US Cash Box Top Stereo Albums	31
