= That Towering Feeling! =

Studio album by Vic Damone
- Released: August 1956
- Genres: Traditional pop; vocal pop; standards
- Length: 35:27
- Label: Columbia
- Producer: Tutti Camarata

Vic Damone chronology
Amor (1953)	That Towering Feeling! (1956)	Angela Mia (1958)

That Towering Feeling! is the eighth studio album by American singer Vic Damone, released in 1956, by Columbia Records. This was his first project after leaving Mercury Records, and was available only in mono sound. It was produced by Tutti Camarata.

The album features a smallish big band, strings, and rhythm section with alternating soloists, as well as what AllMusic described as "a couple of Sinatra-style swingers". Material is primarily well-known standards, most notably including "Cheek to Cheek" and "Smoke Gets in Your Eyes".

The album was released on compact disc by Collectables Records in January 1996 as tracks 13 through 24 on a pairing of two albums on one CD with tracks 13 through 23 along with Damone's final Columbia album, Young and Lively. and by EMI Music Distribution in 2000, as tracks 1 through 12 on a pairing of two albums on one CD with tracks 12 through 24 consisting of Damone's Columbia album from December 1960, On the Swingin' Side.

Collectables included this CD in a box set entitled Only the Best of Vic Damone, which contains six of his studio albums and one compilation and was released on November 27, 2007.

== Chart performance ==
That Towering Feeling! was a commercial success, and marked Damone's first album to appear on the record charts. The album debuted on the Billboard pop albums chart in the issue dated October 14, 1956, and remained on the chart for 8 weeks, peaking at number 14, the highest position Damone achieved on the chart.

== Reception ==
Professional ratings
Review scores
Source	Rating
AllMusic	4/5 stars
The Encyclopedia of Popular Music	4/5 stars

The album received a positive reception upon its release. Billboard gave a positive review of the effort, saying "the warbler in fine vocal from The 1930's and 1940's, and sings as usual - with impeccable taste and richness." Cashbox praised Damone, saying that he "covers a variety of tempos, and is sensitively sweet on the warmer arrangements and rings with verve on the swinging numbers." Warsaw Times-Union mentioned that "he lends his fine tenor to a good collection."

Retrospectives were also positive. Nick Dedina of AllMusic called it "one of his finest efforts", and stated that he has "a naturally beautiful voice that he's often at his best when he isn't pushing too hard, as attested by his gorgeous interpretations of 'The Touch of Your Lips' and 'Time on My Hands' heard here." Adding,"He's also loose and nimble on the upbeat numbers, and 'swinging' isn't the first word generally associated with Damone." In A Biographical Guide to the Great Jazz and Pop Singers, Will Friedwald called it "a full-fledged jazz album." The Encyclopedia of Popular Music gave the album a four-star rating as well.

== Track listing ==
=== Side one ===
No.	Title	Writer(s)	Length
1.	"You Stepped Out of a Dream" (From the Metro-Goldwyn-Mayer Film: Ziegfeld Girl)	Nacio Herb Brown, Gus Kahn	3:09
2.	"Wait Till You See Her" (From the Broadway Musical: By Jupiter)	Richard Rodgers, Lorenz Hart	3:19
3.	"Out of Nowhere" (From The Paramount Pictures: Confessions of a Co-Ed)	Johnny Green, Edward Heyman	3:42
4.	"The Song Is You" (From the Broadway Musical: Music in the Air)	Jerome Kern, Oscar Hammerstein II	2:19
5.	"Spring Is Here" (From the Broadway Musical: I Married an Angel)	Richard Rodgers, Lorenz Hart	3:30
6.	"Let's Fall in Love" (From The Columbia Pictures: Let's Fall in Love)	Harold Arlen, Ted Koehler	1:58

=== Side two ===
No.	Title	Writer(s)	Length
1.	"Smoke Gets in Your Eyes" (From the Broadway Musical: Roberta)	Jerome Kern, Otto Harbach	3;49
2.	"Time on My Hands" (From the Broadway Musical: Smiles)	Vincent Youmans, Harold Adamson, Mack Gordon	2:37
3.	"I'm Glad There Is You"	Jimmy Dorsey Paul Madeira	2:41
4.	"The Touch of Your Lips"	Ray Noble	2:24
5.	"All the Things You Are" (From the Broadway Musical: Very Warm for May)	Jerome Kern, Oscar Hammerstein II	3:27
6.	"Cheek to Cheek" (From the RKO Radio Pictures: Top Hat)	Irving Berlin	2:28

== Charts ==
Chart (1956)	Peak position
US Best-Selling Popular Albums (Billboard)	14
