= On the Street Where You Live (album) =

Studio album by Vic Damone
- Released: August 1964
- Genres: Traditional pop; vocal pop
- Length: 32:26
- Label: Capitol
- Producer: Jack Marshall

Vic Damone chronology
| The Liveliest (1963) | On the Street Where You Live (1964) | You Were Only Fooling (1965) |

Singles from On the Street Where You Live
- 1. "On the Street Where You Live" Released: August 24, 1964

On the Street Where You Live is the eighteenth studio album by American singer Vic Damone, released by Capitol Records in August 1964. It was his final album for the label, and was available both in stereo and mono sound. It was produced by Jack Marshall. Damone originally recorded the title song, "On the Street Where You Live", in 1956 while he was signed to Columbia Records.

It contains show tunes under baton of Pete King, including tracks from My Fair Lady, ("On the Street Where You Live"), West Side Story (''Tonight", "Maria", and "Something's Coming"), and Pal Joey ("I Could Write a Book").

The album was released on compact disc by EMI Music Distribution on December 9, 2003, as a double album paired with Damone's 1963 live album, The Liveliest at the Basin Street East.

== Reception ==
Professional ratings
Review scores
| Source | Rating |
|---|---|
| The Encyclopedia of Popular Music | 3/5 stars |

Billboard noted that "He has again come up with a smooth package that's loaded with a vocal charm. With the help of Pete King, who arranged and conducted."

Cash Box claimed "it follows through with the Broadway motif as he serves up warm and sensitive readings of 'She Loves Me', 'Lost in The Stars', 'Younger than Springtime' and a powerful treatment of 'Maria'".

Variety said that "it's a standout catalog containing such numbers as 'I'm Am in Love', 'Younger Than Springtime', 'Till There Was You', 'Maria', 'Lost in The Stars', and 'She Loves Me,' and among others."

American Record Guide referred to it as "an excellent album".

The Standard stated that "The album could be more succinctly titled Broadway Show Stoppers. This is precisely what the disc offers. Vic gets superb support from arranger conductor Pete King and his orchestra." On the other hand, The Encyclopedia of Popular Music gave the album a three-star rating only, meaning that they believed that album was "Good by the artist's usual standrands, ane therefore recommended."

== Track listing ==
=== Side one ===
| No. | Title | Writer(s) | Length |
|---|---|---|---|
| 1. | "On the Street Where You Live" (from the Broadway musical My Fair Lady) | Frederick Loewe, Alan Jay Lerner | 2:39 |
| 2. | "I Am in Love" (from the Broadway musical Can-Can) | Cole Porter | 2:27 |
| 3. | "Younger than Springtime" (from the Broadway musical South Pacific) | Richard Rodgers, Oscar Hammerstein II | 3:20 |
| 4. | "Tonight" (from the Broadway musical West Side Story) | Leonard Bernstein, Stephen Sondheim | 2:34 |
| 5. | "I Could Write a Book" (from the Broadway musical Pal Joey) | Richard Rodgers, Lorenz Hart | 2:34 |
| 6. | "Till There Was You" (from the Broadway musical The Music Man) | Meredith Willson | 2:35 |

=== Side two ===
| No. | Title | Writer(s) | Length |
|---|---|---|---|
| 1. | "Maria" (from the Broadway musical West Side Story) | Leonard Bernstein, Stephen Sondheim | 3:58 |
| 2. | "The Sound of Music" (from the Broadway musical The Sound Of Music) | Richard Rodgers, Oscar Hammerstein II | 3:29 |
| 3. | "Something's Coming" (from the Broadway musical West Side Story) | Leonard Bernstein, Stephen Sondheim | 2:30 |
| 4. | "Lost in the Stars" (from the Broadway musical Lost in the Stars) | Maxwell Anderson, Kurt Weill | 2:31 |
| 5. | "She Loves Me" (from the Broadway musical She Loves Me) | Jerry Bock, Sheldon Harnick | 2:37 |
