= Country Love Songs (Vic Damone album) =

Studio album by Vic Damone
- Released: July 1965
- Genre: Traditional pop, country
- Length: 30:01
- Label: Warner
- Producer: Jimmy Bowen

Vic Damone chronology
You Were Only Fooling (1965)	Country Love Songs (1965)	Stay with Me (1966)

Country Love Songs is the twentieth studio album by American singer Vic Damone released by Warner Records in July 1965, and was available both in stereo and mono sound.

== Background ==
Like Damone's prior album You Were Only Fooling, it was produced by Jimmy Bowen. Neither of the two Bowen-produced albums were a success either aesthetically or at the cashbox.

== Chart performance ==
The album debuted on the Cash Box looking ahead albums chart in the issue dated September 4, 1965, and remained on the chart for seven weeks, peaking at number 117. It debuted on the Record World looking ahead albums chart in the issue dated September 11, 1965, and remained on the chart for eleven weeks, peaking at number 115.

== Compact disc ==
The album was released on compact disc by Collectables Records on August 12, 2003, as a double album paired with Damone's 1965 Warner debut, You Were Only Fooling.

== Reception ==
Professional ratings
Review scores
Source	Rating
The Encyclopedia of Popular Music	2/5 stars

Billboard said Damone retains "the country flavor" of the song selection while enhancing them with his own pop style in "this change of pace album" for the singer.

Cash Box said "the smooth voice of Damone" on this LP brings "plenty of appeal for pop and good music spinners" and "enough attraction to send it soaring up the best seller charts."

Record World called it a "rewarding disk" and noted that "The other cuts are top notchers too", with them being: "Someday You'll Want Me to Want You," "You Don't Know Me" and "You Win Again".

The Asbury Park Evening Press said Damone "seems very much out of place in his Nashville musical setting", claiming "the songs sound insipid" and Damone "ridiculous".

== Track listing ==
=== Side one ===
No.	Title	Writer(s)	Length
1.	"Someday (You'll Want Me to Want You)"	Jimmie Hodges	2:35
2.	"A Fool Such as I"	William Trader	3:06
3.	"Room Full of Roses"	Tim Spencer	3:25
4.	"Together Again"	Buck Owens	2:33
5.	"I Really Don't Want to Know"	Howard Barnes, Don Robertson	3:02

=== Side two ===
No.	Title	Writer(s)	Length
1.	"Faded Love"	Bob Wills, John Wills, Billy Jack Wills	2:33
2.	"You Don't Know Me"	Eddy Arnold, Cindy Walker	3:39
3.	"Bouquet of Roses"	Steve Nelson, Bob Hilliard	2:57
4.	"Crazy"	Willie Nelson	3:13
5.	"You Win Again"	Hank Williams	2:58

== Charts ==
Chart peaks for Country Love Songs
Chart (1965)	Peak position
US Cashbox Looking Ahead Albums	117
US Record World Looking Ahead LP's	115
