= Young and Lively =

Studio album by Vic Damone
- Released: November 1962
- Genres: Traditional pop; vocal pop
- Length: 44:43
- Label: Columbia
- Producer: John Williams

Vic Damone chronology
The Lively Ones (1962)	Young and Lively (1962)	My Baby Loves to Swing (1963)

Young and Lively is the sixteenth studio album by American singer Vic Damone, released by Columbia Records in November 1962, two years after Vic Damone had left the label and joined Capitol. The album was available both in stereo and mono sound. It was produced by John Williams.

The albums contains mix of originals and covers of songs from the 1910s, 1920s, & 1930s "It Had to Be You", "Last Night When We Were Young", The Very Thought of You", "I Got It Bad (and That Ain't Good)".

The album was released on compact disc by Collectables Records in January 1996 as tracks 13 through 24 on a pairing of two albums on one CD with tracks 13 through 23 consisting of Damone's debut Columbia album from November 1956, That Towering Feeling!.

== Reception ==
Professional ratings
Review scores
Source	Rating
The Encyclopedia of Popular Music	3/5 stars

Billboard called the album "a first-rate LP outing" and stated that "It's a dreamy ballad set that showcases the artist's meaningful singing style against classy backgrounds of strings and piano fills."

Cash Box claimed that "the handling of melody have become the chanter's trademarks and elevated him to the upper rank of class performers."

The Ottawa Journal called it "a nice set for night a dreamy atmosphere and songs that are sweet and slow."

The Oshkosh Northwestern describes it as "Most of the 12 tracks are not well-known, but Damone could make them popular, "The Very Thought of You" stands out as best.

The Hamilton Spectator said that Damone "shows himself the master of this ballad class." On the other hand, The Encyclopedia of Popular Music gave the album a three-star rating only, meaning that they believed that album was "Good by the artist's usual standrands, ane therefore recommended."

== Track listing ==
=== Side one ===
No.	Title	Writer(s)	Length
1.	"Last Night When We Were Young"	E.Y. "Yip" Harburg, Harold Arlen	3:23
2.	"We Could Make Such Beautiful Music Together"	Robert Sour, Henry Manners	2:43
3.	"It Had to Be You"	Isham Jones, Gus Kahn	3:31
4.	"In the Blue of Evening"	Al D'Artega, Tom Adair	4:22
5.	"I Got It Bad (and That Ain't Good)"	Duke Ellington, Paul Francis Webster	4:02
6.	"Serenade in Blue" (from the 20th Century Fox Pictures: Orchestra Wives)	Harry Warren, Mack Gordon	3:05

=== Side two ===
No.	Title	Writer(s)	Length
1.	"The Very Thought of You"	Ray Noble	4:03
2.	"Spring Will Be a Little Late This Year" (from the Universal Pictures film: Christmas Holiday)	Frank Loesser	3:51
3.	"Imagination"	Jimmy Van Heusen, Johnny Burke	3:41
4.	"Solitude"	Duke Ellington, Eddie DeLange Irving Mills	4:42
5.	"What Is There to Say?"	Vernon Duke, E.Y. "Yip" Harburg	4:01
6.	"Ev'ry Time We Say Goodbye" (from the 1944 Broadway show Seven Lively Arts)	Cole Porter	3:06
