= Glad To See You =

1944 American musical comedy

Glad To See You was a 1944 American musical comedy. The musical, which involves the adventure of a USO troupe during World War II, was intended for Broadway but flopped, closing after out-of-town tryouts and never opening in New York.

== Production ==
The production involved the efforts of several current or future entertainment-world luminaries: music and lyrics were by Jule Styne and Sammy Cahn, and it was staged and directed by Busby Berkeley, with choreography by Valerie Bettis, set and light design by Howard Bay, and costumes by Travis Banton. Phil Silvers had been planned for the starring role ("Glad to see you" was Silvers' catchphrase), of a nightclub entertainer who tours USO clubs in the Pacific Theater of Operations, but proved unavailable. The role was filled by comedian Eddie Davis, who had written the book (script) with Fred Thompson. Jane Withers and June Knight also starred, and other players included Sammy White and a young Gene Barry.

The production was not a success. It tried out in Philadelphia, opening at the Schubert Theatre (now the Miller) on November 13, 1944, where it was poorly received.

Shortly after the opening, Davis was sidelined in a car crash, and lyricist Cahn himself served as a temporary replacement. The production then moved on December 13 to the Opera House in Boston, where Berkeley left the show to return to Hollywood (being replaced by Charles Conaway) and Eddie Foy, Jr. was drafted for the starring role. It closed there on January 6, 1945, having never made it to Broadway.

== In popular culture ==
A torch song from the show, "Guess I'll Hang My Tears Out to Dry", sung by Withers, became a pop standard, covered by Frank Sinatra, Sarah Vaughan, Ray Charles, Mel Tormé, Linda Ronstadt, and many others. Another song from the show, "B 'Postrophe, K No 'Postrophe, L-Y-N" (a reference to Brooklyn) was recycled and used in the 1950 film The West Point Story, where it was sung by James Cagney.

== Reception ==
Billboard gave a review favorable in some respects, praising the sets, costume, and cast ("The bounty of gals on deck lean definitely to the looker side" (transl. "There was good number of female players, and they were physically attractive")), but castigating the script as "threadbare and shallow... [a] piece of mediocrity" and avering that "there is little in the score that is original or infectious" save for a few numbers, notably Most Unusual Weather.

Mark Steyn, writing retrospectively in 2015, described Glad To See You as an "awe-inspiringly hideous train-wreck of a musical", and it is not known to have been staged since its 1944–45 flop.

== Musical numbers ==
The musical included the following songs:

- "Give Us Dames"
- "Just for You"
- "I Murdered Them in Chicago"
- "What Did I Do?"
- "Ladies Don't Have Fun"
- "I Don't Love You No More"
- "Most Unusual Weather (For This Time of Year)"
- "Any Fool Can Fall in Love"
- "Come On! Come On!"
- "B 'Postrophe, K No 'Postrophe, L-Y-N"
- "I Lost My Beat"
- "Guess I'll Hang My Tears Out to Dry"
- "I'll Hate Myself in the Morning"
- "So This Is Italy"
- "I'm Laying Away a Buck"
- "Grown-Ups Are the Stupidest People"
- "Love and I Went Waltzing"
