= Peter van Steeden =

Dutch composer (1904–1990)

Peter van Steeden (April 4, 1904, in Amsterdam – January 3, 1990, in New Canaan, Connecticut) was a composer. His best-known composition, "Home (When Shadows Fall)", has been performed by many musicians, including Nat King Cole, Louis Armstrong, Paul McCartney, Jackie Gleason, Cab Calloway, Eddie Cantor, Milton Berle, Theresa Brewer, Ella Fitzgerald, The Fontaine Sisters, Mary Martin, Gertrude Lawrence, Kate Smith, Maxine Sullivan, Giovanni Martinelli, Ethel Merman, Dinah Shore, The Ventures, and Sam Cooke.

== Radio ==
Starting on April 17, 1935, van Steeden replaced Lennie Hayton as the orchestra leader for Fred Allen's radio show Town Hall Tonight. He was often given comedy lines by Allen, and the show of April 17, 1940 featured a comedy skit called "From Nipper to Nobody", all about Van Steeden. In 1937, Joseph Henabery directed a 10-minutes documentary Peter van Steeden and His Orchestra in Special Arrangements.

Van Steeden led the orchestra on The Abbott and Costello Show, The Adventures of Christopher Wells, The Alan Young Show, The Bob Hawk Show, Break the Bank, The Harry Savoy Show, Claudia and David, McGarry and His Mouse, Mr. District Attorney, Quizzer's Baseball, Stoopnagle and Budd, Walk a Mile, Lucky Strike Hit Parade, and the George Jessel Show.

== Personal appearances ==
Van Steeden played at many locations throughout the New York metropolitan area, including Whyte's Restaurant, the Parody Club, and the Hotel New Yorker.
