= The Glory of Love (Benny Goodman song) =

1936 song written by Billy Hill

Single by Benny Goodman and His Orchestra (Vocal Helen Ward)
- B-side: "You Can't Pull the Wool Over My Eyes"
- Released: May 6, 1936
- Recorded: April 23, 1936
- Genre: Pop
- Label: Victor; 25316
- Songwriter: Billy Hill

Benny Goodman singles chronology
"The Glory of Love'" (1936)

"The Glory of Love" is a song that was written by Billy Hill and recorded in 1936 by Benny Goodman. Goodman's version was a number one pop hit. The song has been recorded by many artists. It was the signature theme of the 1967 film Guess Who's Coming to Dinner, performed by nightclub singer Jacqueline Fontaine on camera, as well as over the opening and closing credits. Bette Midler included the song in the film Beaches (1988) and it appears on the soundtrack album.

== Charts ==
Chart (1951)	Peak position
US Billboard Hot Rhythm & Blues Songs	1

== The Five Keys version ==
"The Glory of Love"

Single by The Five Keys

from the album Best of The Five Keys
- B-side: "Hucklebuck with Jimmy"
- Released: 1951
- Recorded: 1951
- Genre: Rhythm and blues
- Length: 3:18
- Label: Aladdin
- Songwriter: Billy Hill

In 1951, R&B vocal group The Five Keys had their biggest R&B hit with their version of the song, hitting number one on the R&B chart for four non-consecutive weeks.

Chart (1951)	Peak position
US Billboard R&B Chart	1

== Otis Redding version ==
"The Glory of Love"

Single by Otis Redding

from the album The Dock of the Bay
- B-side: "I'm Coming Home"
- Released: 1967
- Recorded: December 1967
- Genre: Soul, Pop
- Length: 2:38
- Label: Volt; S419
- Songwriter: Billy Hill
- Producer: Steve Cropper

Otis Redding singles chronology
"Shake" (1967)	"The Glory of Love" (1967)	"Tramp" (1967)

In 1967, Otis Redding recorded a cover version for his 1968 album The Dock of the Bay. Redding's cover became a top 20 hit and reached number 19 on the Billboard R&B Songs chart and number 60 on the Billboard Hot 100.

== Charts ==
Chart (1967)	Peak position
US Billboard Hot 100	60
US Billboard Hot Rhythm & Blues Songs	19

== Other versions ==
- Big Bill Broonzy (1957) - also used in the soundtrack of 2003 film Intolerable Cruelty
- Sanford Clark - Dot Records single (1957)
- Chas & Dave - included on the album That's What Happens (2013)
- Rosemary Clooney - My Buddy (1983)
- Billy Cotton and His Band (1936)
- Vic Damone - his version reached No. 15 on the Billboard Easy Listening chart and was later included on his album Why Can't I Walk Away (1968)
- Jimmy Durante - for his album Hello Young Lovers (1965)
- Jacqueline Fontaine - featured prominently in the film Guess Who's Coming to Dinner (1967)
- Peggy Lee - Jump for Joy (1958)
- Dean Martin - included in the album Dean Martin Sings Songs from "The Silencers" (1966)
- John Martyn - included in the album Inside Out (1973)
- Bette Midler - included in the soundtrack of Beaches (1988)
- Paul McCartney - Kisses on the Bottom (2012)
- Tom Rush - included on his 1968 album The Circle Game (1968)
- Kay Starr - for her album Rockin' with Kay (1958).
- The Velvetones (1957) - used in the soundtrack of Casino (1995)
- Veronica Osorio and Alden Ehrenreich - used in the Coen brothers' film Hail, Caesar! (2016)
- Imelda May - used in the film Blithe Spirit (2020)
- Isabelle Fuhrman - used in the film Orphan (2009)
- The Andrews Sisters (1950)
- Keb' Mo' - used in the film One Fine Day (1996)
- John Renbourn & Wizz Jones - on album Joint Control (recorded March 2015 shortly before Renbourn died, by World Music Network) (2016)
- Nuha Jes Izman - used in the television series Yellowjackets (2021)
