= Carl Sigman =

American songwriter (1909–2000)

Background information
- Born: September 24, 1909; Crown Heights, Brooklyn, New York
- Died: September 26, 2000 (aged 91) Manhasset, Town of North Hempstead, New York
- Occupations: Songwriter, lyricist

Carl Sigman (September 24, 1909 – September 26, 2000) was an American songwriter.

== Early life ==
Born in Crown Heights, Brooklyn, New York, to a Jewish-American family, Sigman graduated from law school and passed his bar exams to practice in the state of New York. Instead of law, encouraged by his friend Johnny Mercer, he embarked on a songwriting career. He became one of the most prominent and successful songwriters in American music history. He was awarded the Bronze Star for his efforts in Africa, during World War II.

== Career ==
Although Sigman wrote many song melodies, he was primarily a lyricist. He collaborated with songwriters such as Bob Hilliard, Bob Russell, Jimmy van Heusen, and Duke Ellington.

He also wrote English language lyrics to many songs which were originally composed in other languages, such as "Answer Me", "Till", "The Day the Rains Came", "You're My World", and "What Now My Love?". During the big band era, Sigman composed works used by top band leaders such as Glenn Miller and Guy Lombardo. These included "Pennsylvania 6-5000". His songs were also hits for individual singers. Some of the best-known are "My Heart Cries for You", which was recorded by three different artists in 1951: Dinah Shore, Guy Mitchell and Vic Damone. Two years later, Sigman's song "Ebb Tide" was a hit for Frank Chacksfield; and was a Top 10 Billboard chart hit in 1965 for the Righteous Brothers. It was also recorded by Frank Sinatra, Ella Fitzgerald, the Platters and hundreds of others.

Tommy Edwards scored a No. 1 in 1958 with "It's All in the Game", with lyrics by Sigman set to music the future Vice President Charles Gates Dawes had composed in 1912. He is most widely remembered for writing the lyrics for "Where Do I Begin", the theme song for Love Story. Love Story went on to become the top grossing U.S. film of 1970 and the song became a hit for Andy Williams.

== Recognition ==
In 1972, Sigman was inducted into the Songwriters Hall of Fame.

== Death ==
Sigman died on September 26, 2000, at home in Manhasset, New York.

== Published songs ==
- "A Marshmallow World" (collaboration with Peter deRose)
- "Arrivederci Roma"
- "The All American Soldier"
- "All Too Soon" (collaboration with Duke Ellington)
- "Answer Me"
- "Ballerina" (aka "Dance Ballerina Dance", collaboration with Bob Russell)
- "Buona Sera"
- "Careless Hands"
- "Civilization" (aka "Bongo, Bongo, Bongo, I don't want to leave the Congo")
- "Crazy He Calls Me" (1949 collaboration with Bob Russell)
- "A Day in the Life of a Fool"
- "The Day the Rains Came" (1957)
- "Ebb Tide"
- "Enjoy Yourself" (1948)
- "Fool"
- "How Will I Remember You" (music by Walter Gross)
- "I Could Have Told You" (collaboration with Jimmy Van Heusen)
- "If You Could See Me Now" (collaboration with Tadd Dameron)
- "It's All In The Game"
- "Losing You" (English lyrics)
- "Music from Across the Way"
- "My Heart Cries For You"
- "My Way Of Life" (1968) (collaboration with Bert Kaempfert & Herbert Rehbein)
- "Pennsylvania 6-5000" (collaboration with Glenn Miller)
- "Robin Hood" (closing theme from the TV series "The Adventures of Robin Hood")
- "The Saddest Thing Of All"
- "Shangri-La"
- "Till"
- "What Now My Love"
- "(Where Do I Begin?) Love Story"
- "The World We Knew (Over and Over)"
- "You're My World"
