= Spencer Williams =

American musician, composer, and singer (1889–1965)

Background information
- Born: Spencer Williams; October 14, 1889; Vidalia, Louisiana, U.S.
- Died: July 14, 1965 (aged 75) Flushing, New York, U.S.
- Genres: Jazz, popular music
- Occupations: Composer, musician
- Instruments: Piano, vocals

Spencer Williams (October 14, 1889 – July 14, 1965) was an American jazz and popular music composer, pianist, and singer. He is best known for his hit songs "Basin Street Blues", "I Ain't Got Nobody", "Royal Garden Blues", "I've Found a New Baby", "Everybody Loves My Baby", "Tishomingo Blues", and many others.

== Biography ==
Spencer Williams was born in Vidalia, Louisiana, United States. He was reportedly educated at St. Charles University in New Orleans, although no such school is known to have existed (there was, however, a St. Charles University a few hours west in Grand Couteau).

Williams was performing in Chicago by 1907, and moved to New York City about 1916. After arriving in New York, he co-wrote with Anton Lada of the Louisiana Five several songs. One of them was "Basin Street Blues", which became one of his most popular songs and is still recorded by musicians to this day.

Williams toured Europe with bands from 1925 to 1928; during this time he wrote for Josephine Baker at the Folies Bergère in Paris. Williams then returned to New York for a few years. At the end of the 1920s, Williams was tried but then acquitted on a charge of murder. In 1932, he moved to Europe, spending many years in London before moving to Stockholm in 1951. Williams was married to Pat Castleton (a stage name of Agnes Bage). They had two daughters together, named Della and Lindy.

His hit songs include "Basin Street Blues", "I Ain't Got Nobody", "Royal Garden Blues", "Mahogany Hall Stomp", "I've Found a New Baby", "Everybody Loves My Baby", "Shimmy-Sha-Wobble", "Boodle Am Shake", "Tishomingo Blues", "Fireworks", "I Ain't Gonna Give Nobody None of My Jelly Roll", "Arkansas Blues", plus the dirty blues standard "Georgia Grind", "Paradise Blues", "When Lights Are Low", and "My Man o' War".

Williams returned to New York in 1957, before his death in Flushing, Queens, on July 14, 1965.

Williams was posthumously inducted into the Songwriters Hall of Fame in 1970.
