= Neely Plumb =

Musical artist, arranger, and record producer

- Born: Benjamin Neely Plumb; November 17, 1912; Augusta, Georgia, United States
- Died: October 4, 2000 (aged 87) Sherman Oaks, California
- Occupations: Musician, record producer, A&R
- Instruments: Saxophone, clarinet
- Years active: c.1930–1980s

Benjamin Neely Plumb (November 17, 1912 – October 4, 2000) was an American musician, record producer and A&R executive.

== Biography ==
Neely Plumb was born in Augusta, Georgia, and was a descendant of inventor William Longstreet. He attended Richmond Academy and Georgia Tech, learning saxophone and joining a local band, the Georgia Tech Ramblers. He went on to study music in Chicago and Los Angeles, where he settled in the 1930s, and played saxophone and clarinet in several bands including those led by Artie Shaw and Ray Noble. By the mid-1950s he worked as an arranger for Modern Records, moving to MGM Records in 1957. When there, he arranged and produced Sheb Wooley's 1958 novelty hit, "The Purple People Eater". He also worked with Judy Garland, Lena Horne, and Ray Conniff, among others.

He moved to RCA Records in 1959, where he continued as a producer on records by Artie Shaw, Esquivel, Odetta, Glenn Yarbrough, Vic Damone, and Rod McKuen, who introduced Plumb to an emerging band, Jefferson Airplane. As A&R manager for RCA on the west coast, Plumb signed the band to RCA in 1965. As a producer, Plumb worked on the soundtracks for major motion pictures, including The Sound of Music, Bye Bye Birdie, Romeo and Juliet, True Grit, and Taxi Driver, several of which achieved platinum record status. In 1973, he co-produced the Grammy award-winning album Threshold with composer-conductor Patrick Williams. In 1975, he arranged and produced the album Neely Plumb and the 50 Funky Fiddles.

Plumb died in Sherman Oaks, California, in 2000, at the age of 87. His daughter is actress Eve Plumb.
