= On the Street Where You Live =

Song with music by Frederick Loewe and lyrics by Alan Jay Lerner

Song
- Written: 1956
- Genre: Musical theatre
- Composer: Frederick Loewe
- Lyricist: Alan Jay Lerner

"On the Street Where You Live" is a song with music by Frederick Loewe and lyrics by Alan Jay Lerner from the 1956 Broadway musical My Fair Lady. It is sung in the musical by the character Freddy Eynsford-Hill, who was portrayed by John Michael King in the original production. In the 1964 film version, it was sung by Bill Shirley, dubbing for actor Jeremy Brett.

== Recorded versions ==
"On the Street Where You Live"

Single by Vic Damone
- B-side: "We All Need Love"
- Released: April 1956
- Genre: Show tune
- Length: 2:38
- Label: Columbia
- Composer: Frederick Loewe
- Lyricist: Alan Jay Lerner

Vic Damone singles chronology
"Por Favor" (1955)	"On the Street Where You Live" (1956)	"War and Peace" (1956)

The most popular single of the song was recorded by Vic Damone in 1956 for Columbia Records. It reached No. 4 on the Billboard chart and No. 6 on Cashbox magazine's chart. It was a No. 1 hit in the UK Singles Chart in 1958. Eddie Fisher also had a top 20 Billboard hit with the song in 1956, reaching No. 18. Lawrence Welk and His Orchestra released a version that went to No. 96 in 1956. Andy Williams' recording appeared in the Billboard top 40 in 1964, reaching No. 3 on the adult contemporary chart and No. 28 on the Billboard Hot 100.

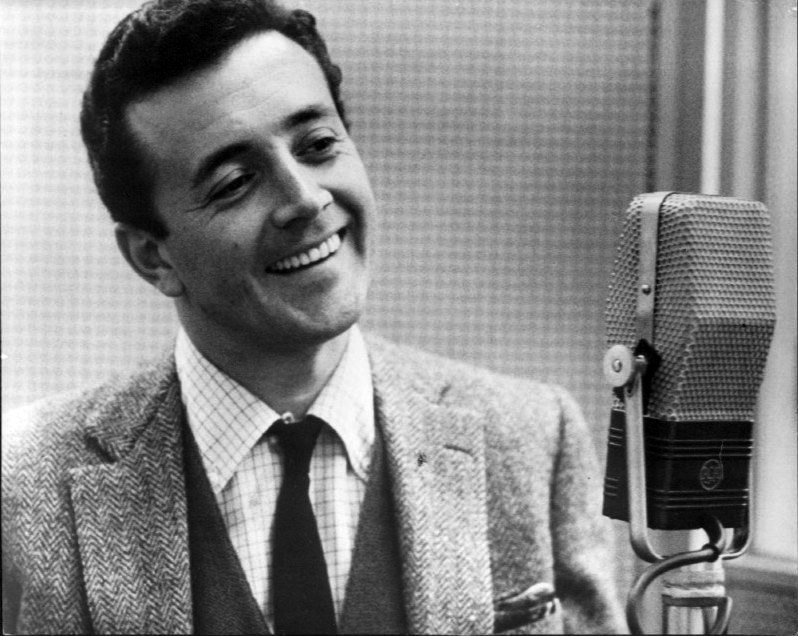
The most successful recorded version was by vocalist Vic Damone

The song has been recorded by a wide variety of other performers, including Ray Conniff and Bing Crosby, who recorded the song in 1956 for use on his radio show and it was subsequently included in the boxed set The Bing Crosby CBS Radio Recordings (1954–56) issued by Mosaic Records (catalog MD7-245) in 2009, Lawrence Welk (whose band also performed it on his weekly TV series numerous times), Shirley Horn, Doris Day, George Shearing, Frank Chacksfield, Alfie Boe, Bobby Darin, Dean Martin, Mario Lanza, Nat King Cole, Holly Cole, Marvin Gaye, Ben E. King, Perry Como, Ray Reach, Harry Connick Jr., Gene Pitney, The Miracles (on their I'll Try Something New album), Earl Grant, Dennis DeYoung, Quincy Jones, David Whitfield, Nancy Wilson, Billy Porter, Ilse Huizinga, Matt Dusk, Richard Clayderman, Ricki Lee Jones, Mr Hudson & The Library, Peggy Lee, Vocal Spectrum, Steve Hogarth from Marillion, Bill Frisell, André Previn & Shelly Manne, Bryn Terfel, Ed Townsend, Chet Baker, Jason Manford, Ronnie Hilton, Willie Nelson, Etta Jones, Jordan Donica, and Eddie Fisher.

== In popular culture ==
- In the 1999 film Blast from the Past, the character Adam Webber, played by Brendan Fraser, sings the song.
- Vic Damone's recording of the song serves as the closing song of "Smoke Gets in Your Eyes", the series premiere of Mad Men (2007), playing as Don Draper returns home to his family.
- In the ninth episode of the third season of Better Things, actors sing the song in a bar after completing a table read of a fictional Broadway play.
- The character Tony Stonem sings this song in an audition in the first episode of Skins.

== See also ==
- List of UK Singles Chart number ones of the 1950s
