= Vic Damone =

American singer and actor (1928–2018)

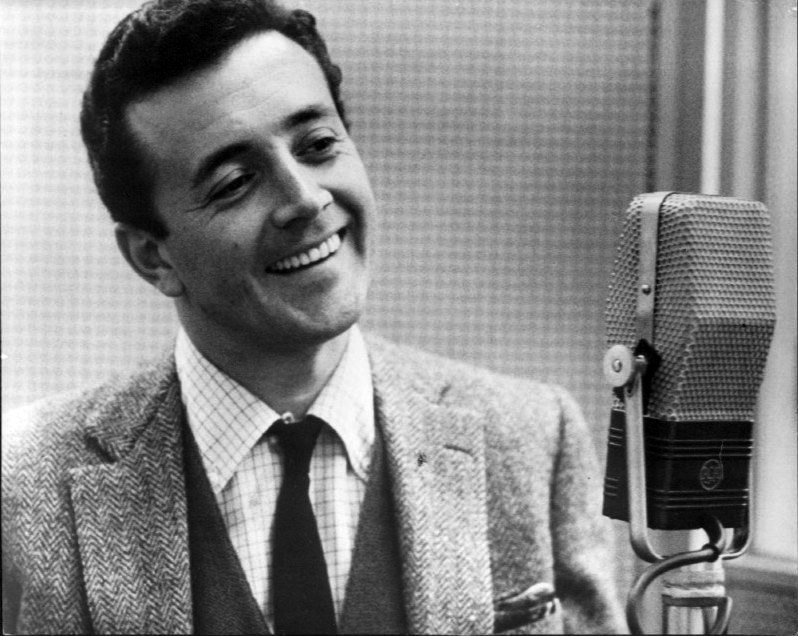
- Damone in 1959

Background information
- Born: Vito Rocco Farinola; June 12, 1928; New York City, New York, U.S.
- Died: February 11, 2018 (aged 89) Miami Beach, Florida, U.S.
- Genres: Traditional pop; big band
- Occupations: Singer; actor; presenter
- Years active: 1947–2001
- Labels: Mercury; Columbia; Capitol; Warner Bros.; RCA Victor; Crown
- Spouses: Pier Angeli (m. 1954; div. 1958) Judith Rawlins (m. 1963; div. 1971) Becky Ann Jones (m. 1974; div. 1982) Diahann Carroll (m. 1987; div. 1996) Rena Rowan-Damone (m. 1998; died 2016)

Vic Damone (born Vito Rocco Farinola; June 12, 1928 – February 11, 2018) was an American traditional pop and big band singer and actor. He was best known for his performances of songs such as the number one hit "You're Breaking My Heart", and other hits such as "On the Street Where You Live" (from My Fair Lady) and "I Have But One Heart".

== Biography ==
=== Early life ===
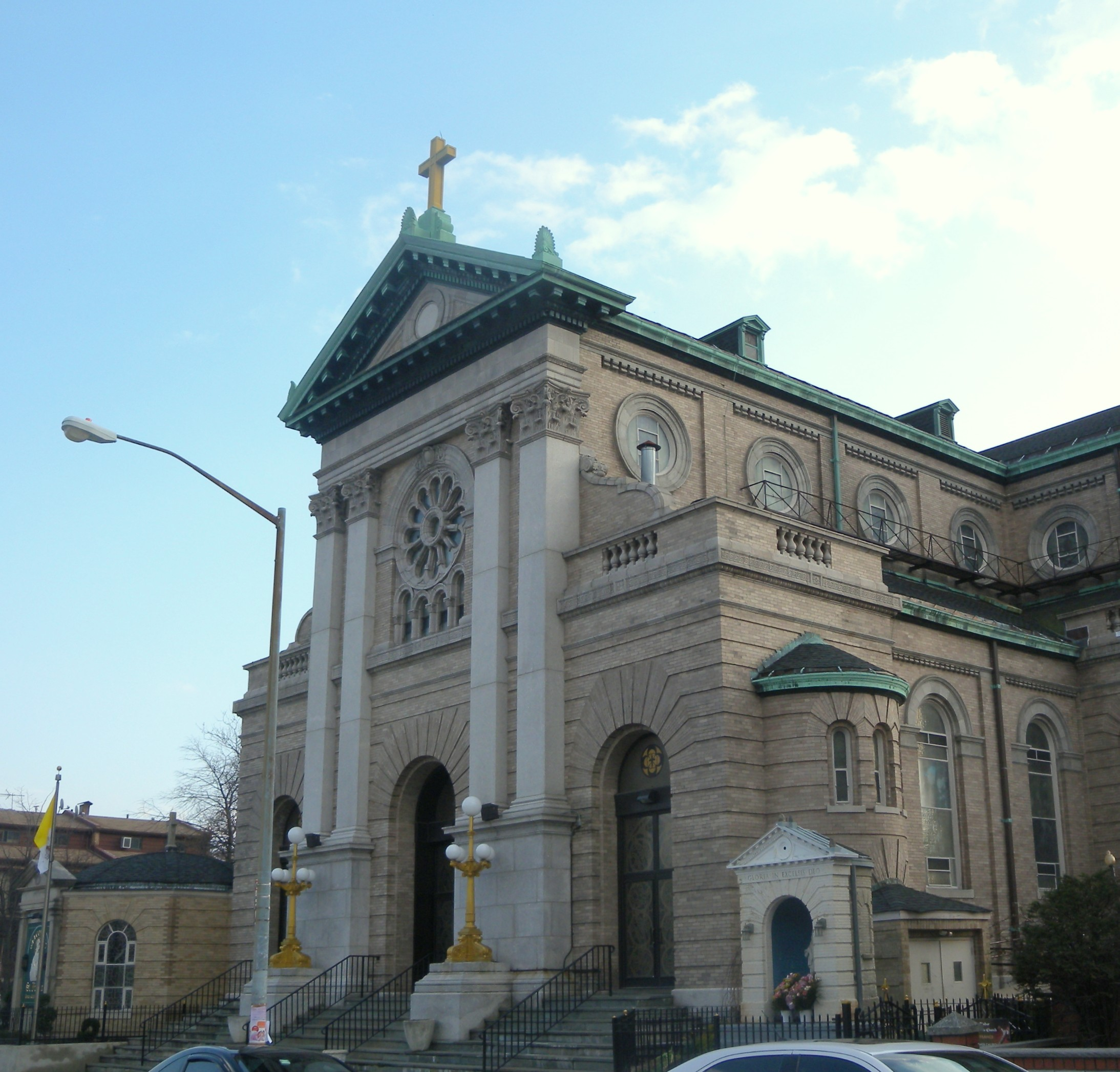
St Finbar's Church, Brooklyn

Vito Rocco Farinola was born in Brooklyn, New York on 12 June 1928 to Rocco and Domenica (Damone) Farinola. He was raised in Bensonhurst, Brooklyn.

When his father was injured at work, Damone had to drop out of Lafayette High School. He then worked as an usher and elevator operator at the Paramount Theater in Manhattan.

=== Career ===
Damone met Perry Como while at the Paramount Theater. Damone stopped the elevator between floors and sang for him. Como was impressed and referred him to a friend for an audition.

Around 1945, when he was 17, Damone began his career at the New York radio station WHN, singing on the Gloom Dodgers show, which provided light entertainment to fans of the Brooklyn Dodgers. He changed his name (using his mother's maiden name) at the suggestion of a regular on the show, comedian Morey Amsterdam.

In April 1947, Damone entered and won the talent search on Arthur Godfrey's Talent Scouts. This led to his becoming a regular on Godfrey's show. He met Milton Berle at the studio and Berle got him work at two night clubs. By mid-1947, Damone had signed a contract with Mercury Records.

In 1947, Damone released his first recording, a cover of "I Have But One Heart", which reached number seven on the Billboard chart. "You Do" reached the same peak. These were followed by a number of other hits.

In 1948, Damone got his own weekly radio show, Saturday Night Serenade.

From November 24, 1948 to November 23, 1949, Damone served as a private in Company D, 107th Infantry Regiment, New York National Guard.

In 1949, Damone was booked into the Mocambo nightclub on the Sunset Strip, residing briefly at the Strip's famed Garden of Allah Hotel.

In April 1949, Damone made his television debut on The Morey Amsterdam Show, performing Cole Porter's "So in Love".

In January 1950, Damone made his first of several guest appearances on Ed Sullivan's Toast of the Town, including a duet, the first of many, with the vocalist and future TV hostess Dinah Shore.

Over the next 30 years, from around 1950 to 1980, Damone became a regular featured guest performer on every major variety series on network television. Among the programs on which he appeared were All Star Revue, Texaco Star Theatre with Milton Berle, The Arthur Murray Party, What's My Line?, The Jackie Gleason Show, The Steve Allen Show, The Perry Como Show, The Bell Telephone Hour, The Dinah Shore Chevy Show, The Garry Moore Show, I've Got a Secret, The Jack Paar Program, The Red Skelton Show, The Andy Williams Show, The Hollywood Palace, The Dean Martin Show, Hullabaloo, Mickie Finn's, The Danny Thomas Hour, The Jonathan Winters Show, The Carol Burnett Show, Della, The Tonight Show Starring Johnny Carson, and various Bob Hope television specials.

In 1951, Damone appeared in two films, The Strip (1951), where he played himself, and Rich, Young and Pretty (1951).

From 1951 to 1953, Damone served in the United States Army, where he spent a year in Germany with the 7729th Special Services Group and eight months at Fort Sam Houston, Texas. Before going into the service, he recorded a number of songs that were released during that time. He served with future Northwest Indiana radio personality Al Evans and country music star Johnny Cash.

In 1954, after leaving the service, Damone married the Italian actress Pier Angeli (Anna Maria Pierangeli).

Also in 1954, Damone made two more films, Deep in My Heart (1954) and Athena (1954).

In 1955, Damone played the Caliph in Kismet (1955).

In 1955, Damone had one song on the charts, "Por Favor", which did not make it above number 73. However, he did have major roles in two movie musicals, Hit the Deck and Kismet.

In early 1956, Damone moved from Mercury to Columbia Records, having some success on that label with hits such as "On the Street Where You Live" (from My Fair Lady, his final pop top 10) and "An Affair to Remember" (from the movie of the same name).

Between 1957 and 1961, Damone made six original albums with Columbia, including That Towering Feeling!, Angela Mia, Closer Than a Kiss, This Game of Love, On the Swingin' Side, and Young and Lively.

In 1960, Damone played an effective dramatic role in the war film Hell to Eternity (1960).

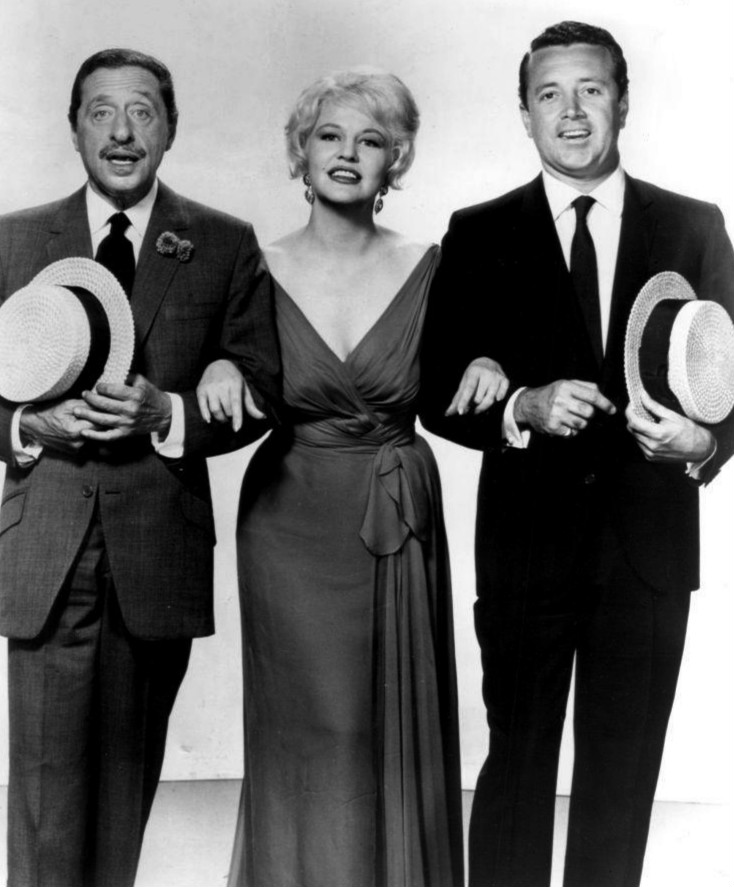
Damone with composer Harold Arlen and Peggy Lee (1961)

In 1961, Damone was released by Columbia. Moving over to Capitol Records, he filled the gap left by Frank Sinatra's departure from the label, who had left to help found Reprise Records. Although he lasted at Capitol only until 1965, he recorded some of his most highly regarded albums with them, including two that made the Billboard Top LPs chart: Linger Awhile with Vic Damone (1961); and The Lively Ones (1962), the latter with arrangements by Billy May, who also arranged another of Damone's Capitol albums, Strange Enchantment. Other original Capitol albums included My Baby Loves to Swing, The Liveliest, and On the Street Where You Live.

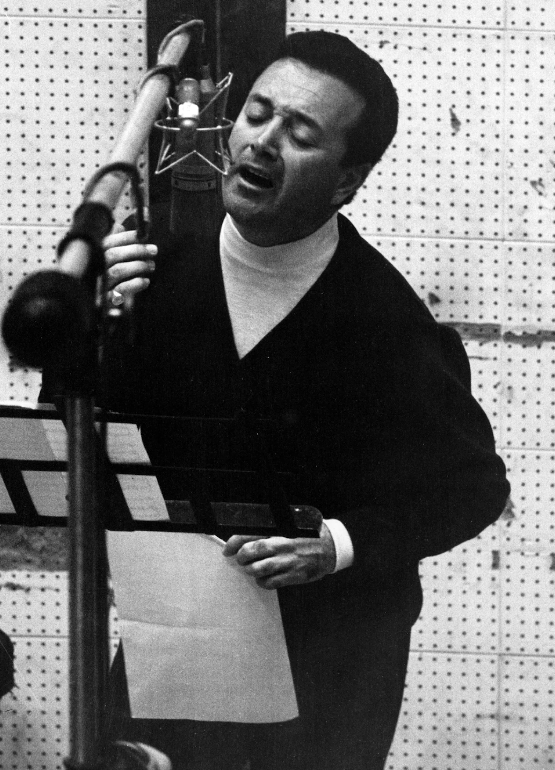
Damone in RCA's recording studio (late 1960s)

In the early 1960s, Damone did limited acting on television. He played Stan Skylar in a 1960 episode, "Piano Man", of CBS's The DuPont Show with June Allyson. He was cast as Jess Wilkerson in the 1961 episode "The Proxy" of the ABC Western series The Rebel, starring Nick Adams.

In 1962, Damone played the crooner Ric Vallone in the episode "Like a Sister" on the CBS sitcom The Dick Van Dyke Show, during which he sang "The Most Beautiful Girl in the World".

During the summers of 1962 and 1963, Damone hosted a television variety series on NBC called The Lively Ones, which showcased current jazz, pop, and folk performers, as well as comedians. His group of musical guests over two seasons included Count Basie, Louie Bellson, Dave Brubeck, Chris Connor, Matt Dennis, Frances Faye, Ella Fitzgerald, Dizzy Gillespie, Buddy Greco, Woody Herman, Jack Jones, Stan Kenton, Gene Krupa, Peggy Lee, Nellie Lutcher, Shelly Manne, Anita O'Day, Ruth Olay, and Oscar Peterson.

From 1963 to 1964, Damone's other notable television work included three guest appearances on CBS's The Judy Garland Show. In addition to his solo performances, Garland and he sang duet medleys of songs from Porgy and Bess, West Side Story, and Kismet.

In 1964, Damone sang "Back Home Again in Indiana" before the Indianapolis 500 car race.

In 1965, Damone next moved to Warner Bros. Records with the albums You Were Only Fooling and Country Love Songs. On Warner Bros., he had one top 100 chart hit: "You Were Only Fooling (While I Was Falling In Love)", which hit number 30 nationally. The next year, he switched record labels again, moving to RCA Victor and releasing the albums Stay with Me, Why Can't I Walk Away, On the South Side of Chicago, and The Damone Type of Thing. In 1967, Damone hosted The Dean Martin Summer Show, which was rerun in 1971. In 1969, he released his last US chart record, a cover of the 1966 song "To Make A Big Man Cry", which made the Billboard Easy Listening chart.

Also in 1965, Damone appeared on the Firestone album series, Your Favorite Christmas Music, Volume 4, singing "It Came Upon A Midnight Clear" and "Have Yourself A Merry Little Christmas".

=== Later career ===
In 1971, Damone began performing in Las Vegas casinos and although he had to declare bankruptcy in the early 1970s, he was earning enough to ease his financial difficulties. He made concert tours of both the US and the UK and recorded more albums for RCA Records.

In 1972, Damone was offered the role of Johnny Fontane in The Godfather after singer Al Martino, who had previously been given the role by producer Albert S. Ruddy, had the part stripped when Francis Ford Coppola became director and wanted Damone to portray Fontane. According to Martino, after being stripped of the role, he went to Russell Bufalino, his godfather and a crime boss, who then orchestrated the publication of various news articles that claimed Coppola was unaware of Martino being awarded the part by Ruddy. Damone eventually declined the role because of a salary dispute and also because he did not want to provoke the mob or anger Frank Sinatra, whom Damone profoundly respected. Ultimately, the part of Johnny Fontane was given to Martino.

In 1974, Damone, who was a guest on a number of UK television programs, appeared on the The Tommy Cooper Hour Christmas Special television show.

In January 1991, Damone appeared in a television commercial for Diet Pepsi first broadcast during Super Bowl XXV. Damone and other stars, including Jerry Lewis, Tiny Tim, Charo, and Bo Jackson, attempted to sing Diet Pepsi's theme song, "You've Got the Right One Baby (Uh-Huh)", which was performed by Ray Charles.

In the Brett Ratner film Money Talks (1997), Chris Tucker's character sees a commercial about Vic Damone and then pretends to be Damone's son. At the time, Vic's real-life son, Perry, had some laughs about that "15 minutes of fame", making mention of it on his midday radio show on Phoenix radio station KEZ.

In 2002, Damone issued his final album, while some of his previous albums were being repackaged and reissued.

In 2002, Damone garnered new fans following the launch of the Vic Damone website, which was created by Damone's sons Perry and Sinclair and ultimately managed by Damone's son-in-law, William "Bill" Karant.

On January 19, 2002, Damone made one of his final public performances at the Raymond F. Kravis Center for the Performing Arts in Palm Beach, Florida. Damone suffered a stroke later in the same year and subsequently retired.

In 2003, Damone decided to issue some previously unreleased material, forming Vintage Records with his son, Perry Damone. His original plan was to issue a seven CD series called 'The Vic Damone Signature Collection', and in May 2003, he released Volume 1, produced by Perry and Frank Sinclair. In May 2004, Damone released his second CD in the Signature Series, again produced by Perry and Sinclair. After this disc was issued, Damone decided to cancel the release of the rest of the collection. During his entire career, Damone recorded over 2,000 songs.

On June 12, 2009, Damone released his autobiography entitled Singing Was the Easy Part from St. Martin's Press. In the book, Damone claimed he had been held dangling out of a window of a New York hotel by a "thug". He further claimed that he had been engaged to the thug's daughter, but ended the relationship when she insulted Damone's mother. He wrote that his life was spared when, during a Mafia meeting to determine the singer's fate, New York mob boss Frank Costello ruled in Damone's favor.

In 2010, Damone called Canadian crooner Michael Bublé talented but "cocky" and criticized him for smoking and drinking "straight alcohol" after a show, believing that it would damage his vocal cords. Bublé responded by saying that he knew what he was doing, but promising that from now on he would always mix his alcohol with soda or orange juice.

On January 22, 2011, Damone briefly stepped out of retirement to once again perform at the Kravis Performing Arts Center in Palm Beach to a sold-out crowd. He dedicated this performance to his six grandchildren, who had never seen him perform live. Damone stated: "I don't need the money ... But, you know, my six grandkids have never seen me on stage. It will be the first time. I will introduce them. It's going to be exciting for me. Before I die, I want them to have heard me perform at least once."

=== Death ===
On February 11, 2018 (8 years ago), at the age of 89, Damone died from complications of respiratory illness.

In 2020, two years after he died, an interview of Damone appeared in one of a series for the documentary Jay Sebring....Cutting to the Truth.

== Personal life ==
Damone was married five times and divorced four:

1. Pier Angeli (1954–1958), actress, singer (one son)
2. Judith Rawlins (1963–1971) (three daughters)
3. Becky Ann Jones (1974–1982), entertainer
4. Diahann Carroll (1987–1996), actress, singer
5. Rena Rowan-Damone (1998–2016), fashion designer, businessperson, philanthropist

Damone had six grandchildren from his three daughters with Rawlins.

Damone's first wife, Pier Angeli, was previously in a well-publicized relationship with James Dean, but was forced to leave him to marry Damone, a move that garnered great media attention. It was reported that Dean had watched the wedding from across the road on his motorcycle, even gunning the engine during the ceremony, although Dean later denied doing anything so "dumb". Six years after divorcing Angeli, Damone was arrested on October 15, 1964, on Angeli's charge that he had kidnapped their nine‐year‐old son and taken him from New York to Los Angeles. He was released three hours later after having pled not guilty to being a fugitive from a kidnapping charge. At the same time, a California judge awarded him custody of their son; however, Angeli ultimately gained custody and left Hollywood for her native Italy, taking their son with her. He returned to California after Angeli's death.

Damone married actress Diahann Carroll in 1987. The union, which Carroll admitted was turbulent, had a legal separation in 1991, reconciliation, and divorce in 1996.

Damone was raised Roman Catholic and served as an altar boy, claiming to have never found deep meaning in his original faith. In the late 1950s, he was introduced to the Baháʼí Faith by a drummer in his band. Damone said his rendition of "On the Street Where You Live" incorporates gestures meant to summon a sustaining vitality from ʻAbdu'l-Bahá. He officially joined the religion in the early 1960s.

Damone met his Polish-born wife Rena Rowan (born Irena Aurelia Jung on January 4, 1928, in Lida, then part of Poland) in 1996, after she asked him to perform at an event to raise money for her Rowan House charity in Philadelphia, which provides housing for homeless single women with children. Rowan, a breast-cancer survivor, was a clothing distributor who started the Jones New York clothing store chain in the mid-1970s.

Damone suffered a stroke in 2002 and another health scare in 2008. He recovered from both, and lived until 2018. He lived in Palm Beach County, Florida in his later years. In January 2015, Damone and Rowan sold their La Casita home for $5.75 million. They moved to a smaller residence, a townhouse in the Sloans Curve Drive neighborhood of Palm Beach. Rowan suffered a stroke in 2011. Two years later, Damone was involved in a tug-of-war in a Palm Beach County court with Rowan's two daughters for control over the destiny of Rowan and her fortune, which was reportedly worth more than $50 million. The court ultimately sided with Damone, ruling that Rowan was capable of making her own decisions. Rowan died on November 6, 2016, at home in Palm Beach, Florida, from complications of pneumonia. She was 88.

== Awards ==
In 1997, Damone received his high school diploma from Lafayette High School in Brooklyn when officials with the school granted credits for life experience and asked him to give the commencement address, in which he advised students to "Have spiritual guidance. Don't lose God. There is a God. Trust me."

In 1997, Damone received the Sammy Cahn Lifetime Achievement Award from the Songwriters Hall of Fame.

Frank Sinatra said that Damone had "the best set of pipes in the business."

For his contribution to the recording industry, Damone has a star on the Hollywood Walk of Fame at 1731 Vine Street in Los Angeles, California.

In 2014, Damone received the Society for the Preservation of the Great American Songbook's first Legend Award in recognition of those who have made a significant contribution to the genre.

== Discography ==
The list below shows the singer's hit songs only. His full discography, singles, and other releases are described in a separate article.

=== Hit songs ===
Single	Year	Chart positions		
Single	Year	U.S.	U.S. AC	UK
"I Have But One Heart"	1947	7	—	—
"You Do"	1947	7	—	—
"Thoughtless"	1948	22	—	—
"My Fair Lady"	1948	27	—	—
"It's Magic"	1948	24	—	—
"Say Something Sweet to Your Sweetheart" (with Patti Page)	1948	23	—	—
"Again" (gold record)	1949	6	—	—
"You're Breaking My Heart" (gold record)	1949	1	—	—
"The Four Winds and the Seven Seas"	1949	16	—	—
"My Bolero"	1949	10	—	—
"Why Was I Born?"	1949	20	—	—
"Sitting by the Window"	1950	29	—	—
"God's Country"	1950	27	—	—
"Vagabond Shoes"	1950	17	—	—
"Tzena, Tzena, Tzena"	1950	6	—	—
"Just Say I Love Her"	1950	13	—	—
"Can Anyone Explain? (No! No! No!)"	1950	25	—	—
"Cincinnati Dancing Pig"	1950	11	—	—
"My Heart Cries for You"	1950	4	—	—
"Music by the Angels"	1950	18	—	—
"Tell Me You Love Me"	1951	21	—	—
"If"	1951	28	—	—
"My Truly, Truly Fair"	1951	4	—	—
"Longing for You"	1951	12	—	—
"Calla Calla"	1951	13	—	—
"Jump Through the Ring"	1952	22	—	—
"Here in My Heart"	1952	8	—	—
"Take My Heart"	1952	30	—	—
"Rosanne"	1952	23	—	—
"Sugar"	1953	13	—	—
"April in Portugal"	1953	10	—	—
"Eternally"	1953	12	—	—
"Ebb Tide"	1953	10	—	—
"A Village in Peru"	1953	30	—	—
"The Breeze and I"	1954	21	—	—
"The Sparrow Sings"	1954	27	—	—
"Por Favor"	1955	73	—	—
"On the Street Where You Live"	1956	4	—	1
"War and Peace"	1956	59	—	—
"Do I Love You"	1957	62	—	—
"An Affair to Remember"	1957	16	—	29
"Gigi"	1958	88	—	—
"The Only Man on the Island"	1958	—	—	24
"What Kind of Fool Am I?"	1962	131	—	—
"You Were Only Fooling"	1965	30	8	—
"Why Don't You Believe Me?"	1965	127	25	—
"Tears (For Souvenirs)"	1965	—	35	—
"On the South Side of Chicago"	1967	—	22	—
"It Makes No Difference"	1967	—	12	—
"The Glory of Love"	1967	—	15	—
"Nothing to Lose"	1968	—	40	—
"Why Can't I Walk Away"	1968	—	21	—
"To Make a Big Man Cry"	1969	—	31	—

== Bibliography ==
- "VH1 page on Vic Damone". October 13, 2008. Archived from the original on August 23, 2003.
