= Mel Tormé discography =

- Studio albums: 34
- Live albums: 19

This is a partial discography of American jazz singer Mel Tormé.

== Studio albums ==
Year	Title
1949	The Original California Suite
1954	Musical Sounds Are the Best Sounds
1955	It's a Blue World (with Al Pellegrini Orchestra)
1956	Mel Tormé and the Marty Paich Dek-Tette (with Marty Paich Dek-Tette)
1956	Mel Tormé Sings Fred Astaire (with Marty Paich Dek-Tette)
1957	Mel Tormé's California Suite (with Marty Paich Dek-Tette)
1957	Tormé Meets the British
1958	Prelude to a Kiss (with Marty Paich Orchestra)
1958	Mel Tormé Sings About Love
1958	Tormé (with Marty Paich Orchestra)
1959	¡Olé Tormé!: Mel Tormé Goes South of the Border with Billy May
1959	Back in Town (with Marty Paich Orchestra and the Mel-Tones)
1960	Mel Tormé Swings Shubert Alley (with Marty Paich Dek-Tette)
1960	Swingin' on the Moon
1961	My Kind of Music
1961	Broadway, Right Now! (with Margaret Whiting)
1962	Comin' Home Baby!
1962	I Dig the Duke! I Dig the Count!
1963	Mel Tormé Sings Sunday in New York & Other Songs About New York
1965	That's All
1966	Right Now!
1968	A Day in the Life of Bonnie and Clyde
1969	A Time for Us (Love Theme from Romeo & Juliet)
1969	Raindrops Keep Fallin' on My Head
1977	Tormé: A New Album
1978	Together Again: For the First Time (with Buddy Rich and his big band)
1983	Top Drawer (with George Shearing)
1985	An Elegant Evening (with George Shearing)
1986	Mel Tormé, Rob McConnell and the Boss Brass (with Rob McConnell and the Boss Brass)
1988	Mel Tormé and the Marty Paich Dektette – Reunion (with Marty Paich Dek-Tette)
1992	Nothing Without You (with Cleo Laine)
1992	Christmas Songs
1994	A Tribute to Bing Crosby
1995	Velvet & Brass (with Rob McConnell and the Boss Brass)
1999	Mel Tormé at the Movies (CD compilation with tracks taken from movies OST)

== Live albums ==
Year	Title
1955	Mel Tormé at the Crescendo
1957	Mel Tormé at the Crescendo
1957	Songs for Any Taste
1962	Mel Tormé at the Red Hill
1975	Mel Tormé live at the Maisonette
1981	Mel Tormé and Friends
1982	Encore at Marty's
1982	The Classic Concert Live (with George Shearing and Gerry Mulligan)
1982	An Evening with George Shearing & Mel Tormé (with George Shearing)
1983	An Evening at Charlie's (with George Shearing)
1987	A Vintage Year (with George Shearing)
1988	Mel Tormé and the Marty Paich Dektette – In Concert Tokyo (with Marty Paich and his Dek-Tette)
1990	Night at the Concord Pavilion
1990	Mel and George "Do" World War II (with George Shearing)
1990	Mel Tormé Live at the Fujitsu–Concord Festival 1990
1992	Sing Sing Sing
1993	The Great American Songbook: Live at Michael's Pub
1996	An Evening with Mel Tormé
2002	Mel Tormé Live at the Playboy Jazz Festival (Recorded 1993)

== Selected compilations ==
Year	Title
2002	The Complete Concord Recordings (with George Shearing); Includes the six studio and live albums listed above with Shearing, along with a bonus CD of unreleased recordings.
2004	Jazz And Velvet; Boxset of 4 CDs compiled by Proper Records.

== Chart singles ==
Year	Single	Chart Positions	
Year	Single	US Pop	UK
1945	"I Fall in Love Too Easily"; Eugenie Baird with Mel Tormé's Mel-Tones	20	-
1946	"Day by Day"; Bing Crosby with Mel Tormé & His Mel-Tones	15	-
1947	"It's Dreamtime"; Mel Tormé with the Mel-Tones	24	-
1949	"Careless Hands"	1	-
1949	"Again" / "Blue Moon"	3; 20	- -
1949	"The Four Winds and the Seven Seas"	10	-
1950	"The Old Master Painter"; Peggy Lee & Mel Tormé	9	-
1950	"Bewitched"	8	-
1952	"Anywhere I Wander"	30	-
1956	"Mountain Greenery"	-	4
1962	"Comin' Home Baby"	36	13

== Contributions ==
- Born to Laugh at Tornadoes (1983, Geffen) - "Zaz Turned Blue" (with Was (Not Was))
- 2:00 AM Paradise Cafe (1984, Arista) - "Big City Blues" (with Barry Manilow)
