= Happy Holidays (disambiguation) =

"Happy holidays" is a spoken or written greeting commonly used in North America during or before the Christmas and holiday season.

Happy Holidays or Happy Holiday may also refer to:

== Music ==
=== Albums and EPs ===
- Happy Holiday (Jo Stafford album), 1955
  - Happy Holidays: I Love the Winter Weather, a 1999 compilation album by Jo Stafford
- Happy Holiday (EP), by Marcella Detroit, 2011
- Happy Holidays (Billy Idol album), 2006
- Happy Holidays (Magnus Carlsson album), 2014
- Happy Holidays from Drive-Thru Records, a compilation album, 2004

=== Songs ===
- "Happy Holiday" (song), a 1942 song written by Irving Berlin
- "Happy Holiday", a track on the 2006 album Happy Holidays by Billy Idol
- "Happy Holiday", a track on the 2008 album We Stand United by beFour

== Other uses ==
- Happy Holidays (film), a 2024 film by Scandar Copti
- Happy Holidays (TV series), a British television mini-series
- Happy Holiday, a 1954 musical version of the play The Ghost Train
- "Happy Holiday" (Ghosts), a 2022 television episode
- "Chag sameach", a Jewish greeting meaning "Happy holiday"

== See also ==
- Holiday (disambiguation)
- Happy Hollidays, a 2009 Scottish TV sitcom
- "Happy Holidays, You Bastard", a song from the 2001 album Take Off Your Pants and Jacket by Blink-182
- #1HappyHoliday, a 2017 EP by DRAM
- Happy Holidays to You, a 1979 album by The Whispers
- "Happy Holi", greeting on the Indian festival of Holi
