= Happy Holidays: I Love the Winter Weather =

Compilation album by Jo Stafford
- Released: October 12, 1999
- Genre: Traditional pop, Jazz, Christmas
- Label: Corinthian Records

Professional ratings
Review scores
Source	Rating
Allmusic	4.5/5 stars

Happy Holidays: I Love the Winter Weather is a 1999 compilation album of seasonal songs recorded by American singer Jo Stafford. It was released by Corinthian Records, the label founded by Stafford and her husband Paul Weston on October 12, 1999.

The album contains recordings that originally appeared on Stafford's Columbia Records LPs Happy Holiday (1955) and Ski Trails (1956).

== Track listing ==
1. "Happy Holiday"
2. "Winter Weather"
3. "Sleigh Ride"
4. "By the Fireside"
5. "I've Got My Love to Keep Me Warm"
6. "Jingle Bells"/"Winter Wonderland"
7. "Toyland"
8. "'Twas the Night Before Christmas"
9. "March of the Toys"
10. "The Christmas Song"
11. "I Wonder as I Wander"
12. "O Little Town of Bethlehem"
13. "Silent Night"
14. "Hanover Winter Song"
15. "It Happened in Sun Valley"
16. "June in January"
17. "The Whiffenpoof Song"
18. "Baby, It's Cold Outside"
19. "The Nearness of You"
20. "Let It Snow! Let It Snow! Let It Snow!"
21. "Moonlight in Vermont"
22. "Happy Holiday" (reprise)
