= Cab Driver =

Song by the Mills Brothers

Single by The Mills Brothers

from the album Fortuosity
- B-side: "Fortuosity"
- Released: September 1967
- Genre: Traditional pop
- Length: 2:45
- Label: Dot
- Songwriter(s): Carson Parks
- Producer(s): Charles Randolph Grean, Tom Mack

The Mills Brothers singles chronology
"Honeysuckle Rose Blues Bossa Nova" (1966)	"Cab Driver" (1967)	"My Shy Violet" (1968)

"Cab Driver" is a song written by Carson Parks and performed by The Mills Brothers featuring Sy Oliver and His Orchestra. It reached #3 on the Easy Listening chart, #21 on the Cashbox chart, and #23 on the Billboard Hot 100 chart in 1968. It was featured on their 1968 album Fortuosity.

The song was arranged by Sy Oliver and produced by Charles Randolph Grean and Tom Mack.

The song ranked #86 on Billboard magazine's Top 100 singles of 1968.

== Other charting versions ==
- Hank Thompson released a version of the song as a single in 1972 which reached #13 on the Canadian country chart and #16 on the U.S. country chart.

== Other versions ==
- Mel Tormé released a version of the song on his 1968 album A Day in the Life of Bonnie and Clyde.
- Tennessee Ernie Ford released a version of the song on his 1969 album The New Wave.
- The Mom and Dads released a version of the song as the B-side to their 1969 single "Skirts".
- Myrtle K. Hilo released a version of the song on her 1973 album Mahalo Plenty.
- The Gatlin Brothers released a version of the song on their 1993 album Moments to Remember.
- Nancy and Beth released a version of the song on their 2017 album Nancy and Beth.
- Scooter Lee released a version of the song on her 2005 album Test Of Time.
