= Sing Sing Sing (album) =

Live album by Mel Tormé
- Released: 1992
- Recorded: November 14, 1992
- Venue: Kani-hoken Hall, Tokyo
- Genre: Vocal jazz
- Length: 59:28
- Label: Concord
- Producer: Carl Jefferson

Mel Tormé chronology
Christmas Songs (1992)	Sing Sing Sing (1992)	A Tribute to Bing Crosby (1992)

Professional ratings
Review scores
Source	Rating
Allmusic	4/5 stars
The Penguin Guide to Jazz Recordings	2.5/4 stars

Sing Sing Sing is a 1992 live album by Mel Tormé.

== Track listing ==
1. "Lulu's Back in Town" (Al Dubin, Harry Warren) – 4:29
2. "Memories of You" (Eubie Blake, Andy Razaf) – 5:04
3. "It's All Right with Me"/"Love" (Cole Porter)/(Ralph Blane, Hugh Martin) – 3:27
4. "These Foolish Things (Remind Me of You)" (Harry Link, Holt Marvell, Jack Strachey) – 5:00
5. All Medley: "All the Things You Are"/"All of You"/"All of Me" (Jerome Kern, Oscar Hammerstein II)/(Porter)/(Gerald Marks, Seymour Simons) – 4:32
6. Tribute to Benny Goodman: "Stompin' at the Savoy"/"Don't Be That Way"/"And the Angels Sing"/Gotta Be This or That"/"Jersey Bounce"/"Why Don't You Do Right"/"Avalon"/"Sing Sing Sing" (Razaf, Edgar Sampson)/(Benny Goodman, Sampson, Mitchell Parish)/(Ziggy Elman, Johnny Mercer)/(Sunny Skylar)/(Tiny Bradshaw, Buddy Feyne, Edward Johnson, Bobby Plater)/(Kansas Joe McCoy)/(Al Jolson, Buddy DeSylva, Vincent Rose)/(Louis Prima) – 14:34
7. "Get Happy" (Harold Arlen, Ted Koehler) – 3:30
8. "Three Little Words" (Bert Kalmar, Harry Ruby) – 3:39
9. "Guess I'll Hang My Tears Out to Dry" (Sammy Cahn, Jule Styne) – 5:14
10. "Lover, Come Back to Me" (Hammerstein, Sigmund Romberg) – 5:16
11. "Ev'ry Time We Say Goodbye" (Porter) – 2:54

== Personnel ==
- Mel Tormé - vocals
- Ken Peplowski - clarinet
- Peter Appleyard - vibraphone
- John Leitham - double bass
- John Colianni - piano
- Donny Osborne - drums
