= Prelude to a Kiss =

Prelude to a Kiss may refer to:

- Prelude to a Kiss (album), 1958 concept album by Mel Tormé
- Prelude to a Kiss (play), 1988 play by Craig Lucas
- Prelude to a Kiss (film), 1992 film based on the play
- "Prelude to a Kiss" (song), 1938 song by Duke Ellington
- "Prelude to a Kiss", a 2008 song by Alicia Keys for her album As I Am
- "Prelude to a Kiss", 1999 episode of Sabrina the Teenage Witch
