= Mom and Dad =

Mom and Dad or Mom & Dad may refer to:

- Parents
- Mom and Dad (1945 film), an American film
- Mom and Dad (2017 film), a 2017 American horror film directed by Brian Taylor
- "Mom and Dad" (How I Met Your Mother), an episode of the television series How I Met Your Mother
- Mom and Dad, a 1998 EP by the Swedish rock group The Bear Quartet
- The Mom and Dads, an American folk music group

== See also ==
- "Mum and Dad", a 1977 reggae single by Louisa Mark (credited as "Louisa Marks")
- Mum & Dad, a 2008 British horror film
- Mother and Father (disambiguation)
