= Love in Bloom =

Love in Bloom may refer to:

- "Love in Bloom" (song), a 1934 popular song by Ralph Rainger and Leo Robin
- Love in Bloom (film), a 1935 comedy film with George Burns
