= Tormé Meets the British =

Studio album by Mel Tormé
- Released: 1957
- Recorded: 1957
- Genre: Vocal jazz
- Length: 33:15
- Label: Philips

Mel Tormé chronology
Songs for Any Taste (1957)	Tormé Meets the British (1957)	Prelude to a Kiss (1958)

Professional ratings
Review scores
Source	Rating
AllMusic	(no review, not rated)

Tormé Meets the British is a 1957 studio album by Mel Tormé, of British songs, recorded in London.

== Track listing ==
1. "Limehouse Blues" (Philip Braham, Douglas Furber)
2. "A Nightingale Sang in Berkeley Square" (Eric Maschwitz, Manning Sherwin)
3. "I've Got a Lovely Bunch of Coconuts" (Fred Heatherton)
4. "These Foolish Things (Remind Me of You)" (Harry Link, Holt Marvell, Jack Strachey)
5. "Geordie"
6. "My One and Only Highland Fling"
7. "(There'll Be Bluebirds Over) The White Cliffs of Dover" (Walter Kent, Nat Burton)
8. "Danny Boy" (Traditional, Frederic Weatherly)
9. "Let There Be Love" (Ian Grant, Lionel Rand)
10. "Greensleeves" (Traditional)
11. "Try a Little Tenderness" (James Campbell, Reginald Connelly, Harry M. Woods)
12. "London Pride" (Noël Coward)

== Personnel ==
=== Performance ===
- Mel Tormé - vocals
- Wally Stott - arranger, conductor
