= Raindrops Keep Fallin' on My Head (disambiguation) =

"Raindrops Keep Fallin' on My Head" is song written by Hal David and Burt Bacharach for the 1969 film Butch Cassidy and the Sundance Kid.

Raindrops Keep Fallin' on My Head may also refer to:

- Raindrops Keep Fallin' on My Head (Andy Williams album)
- Raindrops Keep Fallin' on My Head (Johnny Mathis album)
- Raindrops Keep Fallin' on My Head (Mel Tormé album)
- "Raindrops Keep Falling On My Head" (Grey's Anatomy)
