= Cow-Cow Boogie =

1942 song

Song
- Language: English
- Published: 1942
- Composer: Don Raye
- Lyricists: Benny Carter; Gene De Paul

"Cow Cow Boogie (Cuma-Ti-Yi-Yi-Ay)" is a "country-boogie"-style blues song, with music was written by Don Raye, and lyrics were written by Benny Carter and Gene De Paul. The song was written for the 1942 Abbott & Costello film Ride 'Em Cowboy, which included Ella Fitzgerald as a cast member, but was cut from the movie.

== Background ==
The song utilizes the folklore of the singing cowboy in the American West. In the lyrics, the cowboy is from the city and tells his "dogies" (motherless calves) to "get hip."

== First recording ==
The first recording was by Freddie Slack & his Orchestra, featuring vocalist Ella Mae Morse in 1942. The record was the second release by Capitol Records and their first million-seller/ number one on the charts record. Morse learned the song from hearing Fitzgerald on a soundtrack she had acquired, even though the song had been cut from the movie. Morse also recalled recording the song in a single take, which she had thought was only a rehearsal.

== Other recordings ==
- The November 3, 1943 collaboration between The Ink Spots and Ella Fitzgerald resulted in a number-one hit on the Harlem Hit Parade and a number-10 hit on the pop chart.
- Frankie Laine (1961) (included in the Bear Family Records 9-CD set Rawhide)
- The Mills Brothers - for the album San Antonio Rose (1961).
- Ray Stevens covered the song for his album Misty (Ray Stevens album) (1975).
- Mel Torme - included on the album Mel Tormé, Rob McConnell and the Boss Brass (1986).
- Mother-daughter duo The Judds recorded the song for their 1987 album Heartland.
