= Ski Trails =

- Cover of the re-issue LP on Corinthian Records

Studio album by Jo Stafford
- Released: November 1956
- Genre: Traditional pop
- Label: Columbia (original); Corinthian (reissue)

Jo Stafford chronology
A Gal Named Jo (1956)	Ski Trails (1956)	Once Over Lightly (1957)

Professional ratings
Review scores
Source	Rating
Allmusic	3/5 stars

Ski Trails is a 1956 album by Jo Stafford, with accompaniment by Paul Weston and His Orchestra, The Starlighters, and the Norman Luboff Choir. Most of its songs have a winter theme.

Originally released on Columbia Records, the album was reissued in the 1970s on Stafford and Weston's Corinthian Records label. All of its tracks, along with those from Stafford's 1955 Happy Holiday album, are included on the 1999 Corinthian compilation Happy Holidays: I Love the Winter Weather.

== Track listing ==
1. "Baby, It's Cold Outside"
2. "Moonlight in Vermont"
3. "Let It Snow! Let It Snow! Let It Snow!"
4. "By the Fireside"
5. "Hanover Winter Song"
  - Corinthian reissue substitutes "Winter Weather", originally from Stafford's Happy Holiday album
6. "It Happened in Sun Valley"
7. "I've Got My Love to Keep Me Warm"
8. "The Nearness of You"
9. "Winter Wonderland"
10. "June in January"
11. "The Whiffenpoof Song"
12. "Sleigh Ride"
