= Mother and Father (disambiguation) =

Mother and Father may refer to:

- Parents, two people usually described as mother and father.
- The Mother and The Father, English edition 2015 of La Mère 2010 and Le Père 2012 by French writer Florian Zeller
- "Mother and father", song by Jerome Kern; M E Rourke; Charles Frew 1910
- "Mother and Father", song by Madonna from American Life
- "Mother & Father", song by New Zealand band Broods
- "Mother/Father" by American no wave band Swans from The Great Annihilator

== See also ==
- Mama Tata religion
- Mom and Dad (disambiguation)
