= A Day in the Life of Bonnie and Clyde =

Studio album by Mel Tormé
- Released: February 1968
- Recorded: 1968
- Genre: Vocal jazz
- Length: 29:12
- Label: Liberty

Mel Tormé chronology
Right Now! (1966)	A Day in the Life of Bonnie and Clyde (1968)	A Time for Us (Love Theme from Romeo & Juliet) (1969)

A Day in the Life of Bonnie and Clyde is a 1968 studio album by Mel Tormé. It was released during a wave of renewed interest in the crime duo Bonnie and Clyde following the release of the 1967 film Bonnie and Clyde. With the exception of the title track, an original song by Tormé, the album mostly consists of covers of popular songs from the late 1920s and early 1930s, around the period when the real-life Bonnie and Clyde were committing their bank robberies. (Another exception is "I Concentrate on You", a Cole Porter song from 1940.)

== Track listing ==
No.	Title	Writer(s)	Length
1.	"The Gold Diggers' Song (We're in the Money)"	Al Dubin, Harry Warren
2.	"Annie Doesn't Live Here Anymore"	Harold Spina, Johnny Burke
3.	"Button Up Your Overcoat"	Ray Henderson, Buddy DeSylva, Lew Brown
4.	"You're the Cream in My Coffee"	Brown, DeSylva, Henderson
5.	"With Plenty of Money and You (Oh! Baby What I Couldn't Do)"	Harry Warren, Al Dubin
6.	"A Day in the Life of Bonnie and Clyde"	Mel Tormé
7.	"The Music Goes Round and Round"	Eddie Farley, Red Hodgson, Mike Riley
8.	"Cab Driver"	Carson Parks
9.	"I Found a Million Dollar Baby (in a Five and Ten Cent Store)"	Warren, Mort Dixon, Billy Rose
10.	"Brother, Can You Spare a Dime?"	Yip Harburg, Jay Gorney
11.	"I Concentrate on You"	Cole Porter
12.	"Little White Lies"	Walter Donaldson

== Personnel ==
- Mel Tormé – vocals
- John Audino – trumpet
- Buddy Childers
- Frank Rosolino – trombone
- Georgie Auld – saxophone
- Bill Green
- Dave Pell
- Mike Deasy – guitar
- Herb Ellis
- Barney Kessel
- Ray Pohlman – double bass
- Eugene Dinovi – Hammond organ, piano
- John Cyr – drums
- Lincoln Mayorga – arranger
