= Raindrops Keep Fallin' on My Head (Mel Tormé album) =

Studio album by Mel Tormé
- Released: 1969
- Recorded: December 1–23, 1969
- Genre: Vocal jazz
- Length: 68:24
- Label: Capitol

Mel Tormé chronology
A Time for Us (Love Theme from Romeo & Juliet) (1969)	Raindrops Keep Fallin' on My Head (1969)	Mel Tormé live at the Maisonette (1975)

Raindrops Keep Fallin' on My Head is a 1969 studio album by Mel Tormé.

As with 1966's Right Now!, Raindrops consists mostly of cover versions of popular songs of the late 1960s. This would be the last studio album Tormé would record before taking an eight-year hiatus; he would return to recording in 1977 with Tormé: A New Album.

== Track listing ==
1. "Take a Letter Maria" (R. B. Greaves)
2. "Traces" (Buddy Buie, James Cobb, Emory Gordy)
3. "Sunshine Superman" (Donovan)
4. "Hung Up Being Free"
5. "Spinning Wheel" (David Clayton-Thomas)
6. "Catch a Robber by the Toe"
7. "Requiem: 820 Latham" (Jimmy Webb)
8. "Into Something"
9. "Raindrops Keep Fallin' on My Head" (Burt Bacharach, Hal David)
10. "You've Made Me So Very Happy" (Brenda Holloway, Patrice Holloway, Frank Wilson, Berry Gordy)

== Personnel ==
- Mel Tormé - vocals
