= Christmas Songs (Mel Tormé album) =

Studio album by Mel Tormé
- Released: October 28, 1992
- Recorded: April 15–June 21, 1992
- Genre: Vocal jazz Christmas music
- Length: 59:28
- Label: Telarc
- Producer: Carl Jefferson

Mel Tormé chronology
The Great American Songbook: Live at Michael's Pub (1992)	Christmas Songs (1992)	Sing Sing Sing (1992)

Professional ratings
Review scores
Source	Rating
AllMusic	4/5 stars
The Penguin Guide to Jazz Recordings	2.5/4 stars

Christmas Songs is a 1992 studio album by the American jazz singer Mel Tormé.

== Track listing ==
1. Christmas Medley: "Jingle Bells"/"Santa Claus Is Coming to Town"/"Winter Weather"/"Winter Wonderland" (James Lord Pierpont)/(John Frederick Coots, Haven Gillespie)/(Ted Shapiro)/(Felix Bernard, Richard B. Smith) - 4:16
2. "Sleigh Ride" (Leroy Anderson) - 2:30
3. "The Christmas Song" (Mel Tormé, Bob Wells) - 3:18
4. "The Glow Worm" (Paul Lincke, Johnny Mercer, Lilla C. Robinson) - 3:24
5. "The Christmas Feeling" (Tormé) - 5:12
6. "It Happened in Sun Valley" (Mack Gordon, Harry Warren) - 2:58
7. "Christmas Time Is Here" (Vince Guaraldi, Lee Mendelson) - 3:49
8. "Good King Wenceslas" (John Mason Neale) - 4:11
9. "What Child Is This?" (William Chatterton Dix), (Traditional) - 3:39
10. "Silver Bells" (Ray Evans, Jay Livingston) - 5:21
11. "Christmas Was Made for Children" (Tormé) - 3:48
12. "The Christmas Waltz" (Sammy Cahn, Jule Styne) - 5:03
13. Medley: "Just Look Around"/"Have Yourself a Merry Little Christmas" (Tormé)/(Ralph Blane, Hugh Martin) - 3:51
14. "God Rest Ye Merry Gentlemen" (Traditional) - 1:39
15. Medley: "Happy Holiday"/"Let's Start the New Year Right"/"What Are You Doing New Year's Eve?" (Irving Berlin)/(Frank Loesser) - 3:25
16. "White Christmas" (Berlin) - 3:58

== Personnel ==
- Mel Tormé - vocals, drums, arranger
- Keith Lockhart - conductor
- John Walsh - trumpet
- Ross Konikoff
- Frank London
- Bob Milikan
- Tom Artin - trombone
- Rich Willey
- Adam Brenner - clarinet, alto saxophone
- Jeff Rupert - clarinet, tenor saxophone
- Larry Dickson - bass clarinet, baritone saxophone
- Jack Stuckey - clarinet, flute, alto saxophone
- Jerry Weldon - clarinet, tenor saxophone
- John Leitham - double bass
- John Colianni - piano
- Donny Osborne - drums
- Angela Morley - arranger
- Robert Woods - Recording Producer
- Jack Renner - Recording Engineer
- Michael Bishop - Recording, Mix, and Mastering Engineer
- Erica Brenner - Associate Recording Producer, Editor
