= Guido Basso =

Canadian jazz musician (1937–2023)

Guido Basso CM
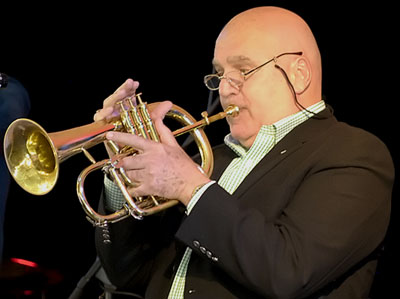
- Basso playing the flugelhorn in 2008

Background information
- Born: 27 September 1937; Montreal, Quebec, Canada
- Died: 13 February 2023 (aged 85) Toronto, Ontario, Canada
- Genres: Jazz
- Occupation: Musician
- Instruments: Trumpet, flugelhorn
- Years active: 1950s–2023

Guido Basso CM (27 September 1937 – 13 February 2023) was a Canadian jazz musician who was a member of Rob McConnell's Boss Brass big band. He was a trumpeter, flugelhornist, arranger, composer, and conductor.

== Early life ==
Guido Basso was born in Montreal, Quebec, on 27 September 1937. He grew up in the Little Italy neighbourhood of Montreal, in an Italian-Canadian family. He began playing the trumpet at the age of nine. He studied at the Conservatoire de musique du Québec à Montréal. His professional music career started in his teens, under the name "Stubby Basso".

During his early 20s, Basso performed regularly at the El Morocco in Montreal and played in bands led by Maury Kaye. Singer Vic Damone discovered Basso playing at the El Morocco, then included him on a tour from 1957 to 1958.

== Career ==
Basso had a professional career as a composer, conductor, arranger, trumpeter, flugelhornist, and harmonica player. The Canadian Encyclopedia wrote that Basso was "one of Canada's pre-eminent jazz trumpeters", and that "he was credited with the theory that one attacks the trumpet and makes love to a flugelhorn".

In 1958, he joined singer Pearl Bailey and her husband, drummer Louis Bellson, touring North America with them and their orchestra. Basso returned to Canada and settled in Toronto in 1961, instead of obtaining permanent residency in the United States and the likelihood of required enlistment in the United States Army. Basso then studied at The Royal Conservatory of Music during the early 1960s.

In 1963, he became music director for CBLT's Nightcap, a job he held until 1967. He subsequently held a number of music director positions with the Canadian Broadcasting Corporation (CBC), as well as being active as a performer. His work at CBC included Barris and Company (1968–69), Mallets and Brass (1969) with vibraphonist Peter Appleyard, music director of After Noon (1969–1971), and leading orchestras playing big band music on 'In the Mood (1971–72) and Bandwagon (1972–73).

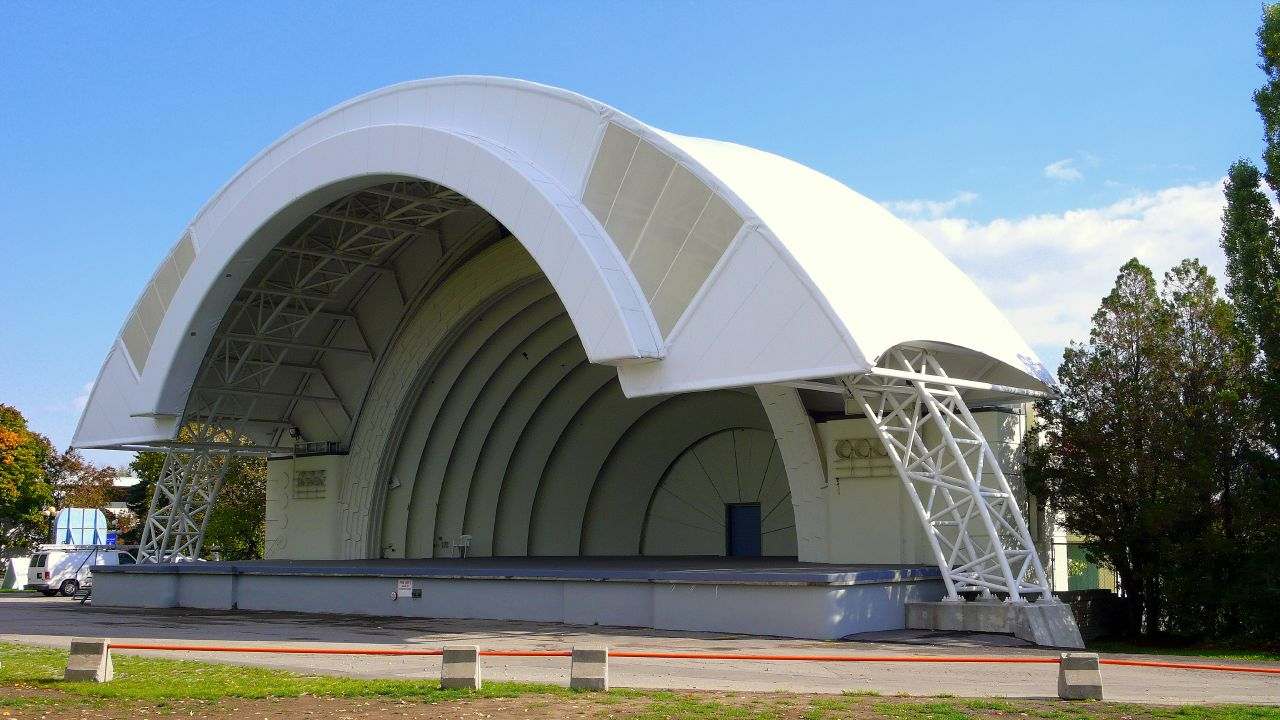
CNE Bandshell at Exhibition Place in Toronto

He organized and led big band concerts at the CNE Bandshell, featuring Dizzy Gillespie, Quincy Jones, Woody Herman, Benny Goodman, Count Basie and Duke Ellington. Basso was a charter member of Rob McConnell's Boss Brass, playing with the band for over twenty years. Basso also played in big bands led by Ron Collier, and Phil Nimmons.

Basso was also featured in the 2009 album Norm Amadio and Friends, playing trumpet and flugelhorn accompaniments.

== Personal life ==
Basso was married to Kristin and had one daughter, Mia Basso Noble, who was a musician and songwriter. Mia died of cancer in September 2013.

Basso died in Toronto, on 13 February 2023, at age 85.

== Awards and honours ==
Basso was made a member of the Order of Canada in 1994. His citation cited him as, "an advocate of the arts and an inspiration to young musicians, he is generous with his time and talent, running workshops and clinics, and lending his name and expertise to worthy causes". He received the Queen Elizabeth II Golden Jubilee Medal in 2002, and the Queen Elizabeth II Diamond Jubilee Medal in 2012.

Basso won the Juno Award for traditional jazz album of the year, Turn Out the Stars, in 2003. and a second Juno Award for traditional jazz album of the year, Lost in the Stars, in 2004.

== Discography ==
=== Albums as a leader or member ===
Albums as a leader or member:

- Guido Basso (Innovation, 1986)
- Bass Busters (Innovative, 1995)
- Midnight Martini (Justin Time, 1999)
- Dedications (Justin Time, 2002)
- A Lazy Afternoon (Justin Time, 2003)
- Lost in the Stars (CBC, 2003)
- One Take, Vol. 1 (Alma, 2005)

With Rob McConnell

- 1976 The Jazz Album
- 1978 Big Band Jazz
- 1980 Present Perfect
- 1981 Live in Digital
- 1982 All in Good Time
- 1984 Old Friends, New Music
- 1985 Boss Brass & Woods
- 1986 Mel Tormé, Rob McConnell and the Boss Brass
- 1991 The Brass Is Back
- 1992 Brassy and Sassy
- 1992 Live in Digital
- 1993 Our 25th Year
- 1994 Overtime
- 1995 Don't Get Around Much Anymore
- 1997 Play the Jazz Classics
- 2000 The Rob McConnell Tentet
- 2002 Riffs I Have Known
- 2003 Music of the Twenties

=== Albums as a guest artist ===
With Anne Murray

- 1993 Croonin'
- 2002 Country Croonin'
- 2004 I'll Be Seeing You
- 2005 All of Me

With Diana Panton

- 2009: pink
- 2013: Christmas Kiss
- 2019: solstice / equinox

With Emilie-Claire Barlow

- 2001 Tribute
- 2005 Like a Lover

With Holly Cole

- 2001 Baby, It's Cold Outside
- 2003 Shade

With Sophie Milman

- 2004 Sophie Milman
- 2007 Make Someone Happy
- 2009 Take Love Easy

With others

- 1977 Peter Appleyard Presents, Peter Appleyard
- 1979 Back Again, The Hi-Lo's
- 1986 Night Flight, Sammy Nestico
- 1994 Masterpieces, The Singers Unlimited
- 1995 Velvet & Brass, Mel Tormé
- 1996 From Lush to Lively, Oliver Jones
- 1996 You Must Believe in Swing, Ranee Lee
- 2005 A Dream Come True, Trudy Desmond
- 2006 I Love Being Here with You, Dione Taylor
- 2007 From Sea to Sky, Laila Biali
- 2008 The Other Woman, Chantal Chamberland
- 2009 Norm Amadio and Friends
