= All in Good Time (Rob McConnell album) =

Studio album by Rob McConnell and the Boss Brass
- Released: 1982
- Genre: Jazz, big band
- Length: 42:42
- Label: Palo Alto
- Producer: Rob McConnell, Paul Jennings

Rob McConnell and the Boss Brass chronology
Present Perfect (1981)	All in Good Time (1982)	Atras Da Porta (1983)

All in Good Time is an album by Rob McConnell and the Boss Brass that won the Grammy Award for Best Large Jazz Ensemble Album in 1984.

== Track listing ==
No.	Title	Writer(s)	Length
1.	"I Got Rhythm"	George Gershwin/Ira Gershwin	6:46
2.	"Close Enough for Love"	Johnny Mandel/Paul Williams	5:45
3.	"Phil Not Bill"	Rob McConnell	4:54
4.	"Ecaroh"	Horace Silver	4:46
5.	"Can't Stop My Leg"		5:34
6.	"Darn That Dream"	Eddie DeLange/Jimmy Van Heusen	6:34
7.	"Schlep It Up to Joe"	Rob McConnell	5:34
8.	"Songbird"	Loonis McGlohon	2:49

== Personnel ==
- Rob McConnell – valve trombone
- Jerry Toth – alto saxophone, clarinet
- Moe Koffman – alto saxophone, soprano saxophone, flute, piccolo
- Bob Leonard – baritone saxophone, bass clarinet
- Eugene Amaro – tenor saxophone, flute
- Rick Wilkins – tenor saxophone, flute, clarinet
- Ian McDougall, Bob Livingston, Dave McMurdo – trombone
- Ron Hughes – bass trombone
- Guido Basso, Erich Traugott, Arnie Chycoski, Dave Woods, John MacLeod – trumpet, flugelhorn
- George Stimpson, James MacDonald – French horn
- Jimmy Dale – piano, electric piano
- Steve Wallace – double bass, bass guitar
- Ed Bickert – guitar
- Terry Clarke – drums
- Brian Leonard – percussion

Production

- Rob McConnell – producer, liner notes
- Paul Jennings– producer
- Phil Sheridan – producer, engineer
- Joe Finlan – assistant engineer
- Peter Norman – mastering
