= Mel Tormé at the Red Hill =

Live album by Mel Tormé
- Released: 1962
- Recorded: March 24, 25, 1962, The Red Hill Club, Pennsauken, New Jersey.
- Genre: Vocal jazz
- Length: 39:08
- Label: Atlantic
- Producer: Michael Cox

Mel Tormé chronology
Comin' Home Baby! (1962)	Mel Tormé at the Red Hill (1962)	Mel Tormé Sings Sunday in New York & Other Songs About New York (1963)

Professional ratings
Review scores
Source	Rating
Down Beat	4/5 stars
Allmusic	4/5 stars

Mel Tormé at the Red Hill is a 1962 live album by Mel Tormé, recorded at the Red Hill Club in Pennsauken, New Jersey.

This was Tormé's first album for Atlantic Records.

== Track listing ==
1. "Shaking the Blues Away" (Irving Berlin) – 2:08
2. "I'm Beginning to See the Light" (Duke Ellington, Don George, Johnny Hodges) – 2:30
3. "Fly Me to the Moon" (Bart Howard) – 4:11
4. Medley: "A Foggy Day"/"A Nightingale Sang in Berkeley Square" (George Gershwin, Ira Gershwin)/(Eric Maschwitz, Manning Sherwin) – 3:30
5. "Love for Sale" (Cole Porter) – 2:47
6. "It's De-Lovely" (Porter) – 4:22
7. "Mountain Greenery" (Lorenz Hart, Richard Rodgers) – 2:49
8. "Nevertheless (I'm in Love with You)" (Bert Kalmar, Harry Ruby) – 3:26
9. "Early Autumn" (Ralph Burns, Woody Herman, Johnny Mercer) – 3:12
10. "Anything Goes" (Porter) – 3:17
11. "(Ah, the Apple Trees) When the World Was Young" (Mercer, M. Philippe-Gerard, Angele Vannier) – 3:44
12. "Love Is Just Around the Corner" (Lewis Gensler, Leo Robin) – 3:15

== Personnel ==
- Mel Tormé – vocals, (piano on three tracks)
- Jimmy Wisner – piano
- Ace Tesone – bass
- Dave Levin – drums
