= The Great American Songbook: Live at Michael's Pub =

Live album by Mel Tormé
- Released: 1992
- Recorded: October 7–8, 1992
- Genre: Vocal jazz
- Length: 59:29
- Label: Telarc Records
- Producer: Carl Jefferson

Mel Tormé chronology
Nothing Without You (1992)	The Great American Songbook: Live at Michael's Pub (1992)	Christmas Songs (1992)

Professional ratings
Review scores
Source	Rating
Allmusic	4/5 stars
The Penguin Guide to Jazz Recordings	2.5/4 stars

The Great American Songbook: Live at Michael's Pub is a 1992 live album by the American jazz singer Mel Tormé.

== Track listing ==
1. "You Gotta Try" (Sammy Nestico) - 4:06
2. Medley: "Ridin' High"/"I'm Shootin' High" (Cole Porter)/(Ted Koehler, Jimmy McHugh) - 2:57
3. "You Make Me Feel So Young" (Mack Gordon, Josef Myrow) - 3:56
4. "Stardust" (Hoagy Carmichael, Mitchell Parish) - 4:58
5. "I'm Gonna Go Fishin'" (Duke Ellington, Peggy Lee) - 3:01
6. Medley: "Don't Get Around Much Anymore"/"I Let a Song Go Out of My Heart" (Ellington, Irving Mills, Henry Nemo)/(Ellington, John Redmond, Bob Russell) - 2:53
7. Medley: "Sophisticated Lady"/"I Didn't Know About You" (Ellington, Mills, Parish)/(Ellington, Russell) - 5:58
8. "Rockin' in Rhythm" (Harry Carney, Ellington, Mills) - 4:22
9. "It Don't Mean a Thing (If It Ain't Got That Swing)" (Ellington, Mills) - 6:30
10. "A Lovely Way to Spend an Evening" (Harold Adamson, McHugh) - 3:34
11. "I'll Remember April"/"I Concentrate on You" (Gene de Paul, Johnston, Don Raye)/ (Porter) - 4:55
12. "Autumn in New York" (Vernon Duke) - 4:18
13. "Just One of Those Things"/"On Green Dolphin Street" (Porter)/(Bronislaw Kaper, Ned Washington) - 4:19
14. "All God's Chillun Got Rhythm" (Walter Jurmann, Gus Kahn, Kaper) - 2:45
15. "The Party's Over" (Betty Comden, Adolph Green, Jule Styne) - 0:57

== Personnel ==
Recorded on October 8, 9, 1992 in New York City, U.S.:

Tracks 1–15

- Mel Tormé - vocals, drums, arranger
- John Walsh - trumpet
- Ross Konikoff - trumpet
- Frank London - trumpet
- Bob Milikan - trumpet
- Tom Artin - trombone
- Rich Willey - trumpet
- Adam Brenner - clarinet, alto saxophone
- Jeff Rupert - clarinet, tenor saxophone
- David Schumacher - bass clarinet, baritone saxophone
- Jack Stuckey - clarinet, flute, alto saxophone
- Jerry Weldon - clarinet, tenor saxophone
- John Leitham - double bass
- John Colianni - piano
- Donny Osborne - drums
