= Nothing Without You (Mel Tormé and Cleo Laine album) =

Studio album by Mel Tormé and Cleo Laine
- Released: 1992
- Recorded: March 12–13, 1991
- Genre: Vocal jazz
- Length: 56:13
- Label: Concord
- Producer: Carl Jefferson

Mel Tormé chronology
Mel Tormé Live at the Fujitsu–Concord Festival 1990 (1991)	Nothing Without You (1992)	The Great American Songbook: Live at Michael's Pub (1992)

Cleo Laine chronology
Jazz (1991)	Nothing Without You (1972)	I Am a Song (1994)

Professional ratings
Review scores
Source	Rating
Allmusic	2/5 stars
The Penguin Guide to Jazz Recordings	2/4 stars

Nothing Without You is a 1991 studio album by the jazz singers Mel Tormé and Cleo Laine.

== Track listing ==
1. "I'm Nothing Without You" (Cy Coleman, David Zippel) – 3:04
2. "I Thought About You" (Johnny Mercer, Jimmy Van Heusen) – 3:51
3. "Where or When" (Lorenz Hart, Richard Rodgers) – 5:09
4. "I Wish I Were in Love Again" (Hart, Rodgers) – 3:11
5. "Girl Talk" (Neal Hefti, Bobby Troup) – 5:09
6. "After You've Gone" (Henry Creamer, Turner Layton) – 4:44
7. "Brazil"/"Bahia" (Ary Barroso)/(Sidney Keith Russell) – 4:19
8. "Birdsong" (Sambalaya) (Johnny Dankworth) – 2:53
9. "Isn't It a Pity?" (George Gershwin, Ira Gershwin) – 4:04
10. "Love You Madly" (Duke Ellington) – 3:34
11. "Angel Eyes" (Earl Brent, Matt Dennis) – 4:34
12. "Two Tune Medley" (Tormé, Laine) – 4:52
13. "I Don't Think I'll Fall in Love Today" (George Gershwin, Ira Gershwin) – 3:45
14. "Ev'ry Time We Say Goodbye" (Cole Porter) – 2:55

== Personnel ==
- Cleo Laine - vocals
- Mel Tormé
