= An Elegant Evening =

Studio album by Mel Tormé
- Released: 1985
- Recorded: May 1985
- Genre: Vocal jazz
- Length: 42:56
- Label: Concord
- Producer: Carl Jefferson

Mel Tormé chronology
An Evening at Charlie's (1983)	An Elegant Evening (1985)	Mel Tormé, Rob McConnell and the Boss Brass (1986)

An Elegant Evening is a 1985 studio album by the American jazz singer Mel Tormé, accompanied by George Shearing.

Professional ratings
Review scores
Source	Rating
Allmusic	3/5 stars

== Track listing ==
1. "I'll Be Seeing You" (Sammy Fain, Irving Kahal) – 3:29
2. Medley: "Love and the Moon"/"Oh, You Crazy Moon"/"No Moon at All" (Mel Tormé)/(Johnny Burke, Jimmy Van Heusen)/(Redd Evans, David Mann) – 4:17
3. "After the Waltz Is Over" (Tormé, Bob Wells) – 5:07
4. "This Time the Dream's on Me" (Harold Arlen, Johnny Mercer) – 3:23
5. "Last Night When We Were Young" (Arlen, Yip Harburg) – 5:17
6. "You Changed My Life" (George Shearing, George David Weiss) – 2:31
7. "I Had the Craziest Dream"/"Darn That Dream" (Mack Gordon, Harry Warren)/(Van Heusen, Eddie DeLange) – 4:20
8. "Brigg Fair" (Traditional) – 4:19
9. "My Foolish Heart" (Ned Washington, Victor Young) – 6:10
10. "You're Driving Me Crazy" (Walter Donaldson) – 4:41

== Personnel ==
- Mel Tormé – vocals
- George Shearing – piano
