= Rob McConnell =

Canadian jazz trombonist (1935–2010)

Background information
- Born: Robert Murray Gordon McConnell; February 14, 1935; London, Ontario, Canada
- Died: May 1, 2010 (aged 75) Toronto, Ontario, Canada
- Genres: Jazz, big band
- Occupations: Musician, arranger, composer
- Instrument: Trombone
- Years active: 1960s–2000s
- Labels: Concord, Pausa, MPS, Dark Orchid, Innovation, Canadian Talent Library, United Artists Records, Attic Records
- Formerly of: Boss Brass

Robert Murray Gordon McConnell OC (14 February 1935 – 1 May 2010) was a Canadian jazz trombonist, composer, and arranger. McConnell is best known for establishing and leading the big band The Boss Brass, which he directed from 1967 to 1999.

== Biography ==
McConnell was born in London, Ontario, Canada, and took up the valve trombone in high school. He began his performing career in the early 1950s, performing and studying with Clifford Brown, Don Thompson, Bobby Gimby, and later with Canadian trumpeter Maynard Ferguson. He studied music theory with Gordon Delamont. In 1968, he formed The Boss Brass, a big band that became his primary performing and recording unit through the 1970s, 1980s, and 1990s.

McConnell assembled the original Boss Brass from Toronto studio musicians. The instrumentation of the band was originally sixteen pieces, consisting of trumpets, trombones, French horns, and a rhythm section but no saxophones. He introduced a saxophone section in 1970 and expanded the trumpet section to include the fifth trumpet in 1976, bringing the total to twenty-two members.

In 1977, McConnell recorded a double LP called Big Band Jazz. This was a 'direct cut' LP using Direct-to-disc recording. A small number of albums that recorded direct-to-disc began to appear on the market in the late 1970s and were marketed as "audiophile" editions, promising superior sound quality compared with recordings made using the more common multi-track tape recording methods. On McConnell's direct cut double LP, an entire side (15 minutes and 2 seconds) was devoted to a version of Gershwin's "Porgy and Bess". The double album won the Juno Award for Best Jazz Album in 1978. His 1983 All in Good Time album won the Grammy Award for Best Large Jazz Ensemble recording.

In 1988, McConnell took a teaching position at the Dick Grove School of Music in California, but gave up his position and returned to Canada a year later. In 1992 he was presented with a SOCAN jazz award. In 1997, he was inducted into the Canadian Music Hall of Fame, and in 1998 was made an Officer of the Order of Canada. He remained active throughout the 2000s, touring internationally as both a performer and educator, running music clinics around the world and performing as a leader and guest artist. The Rob McConnell Tentet, a scaled-down version of the Boss Brass featuring many Boss Brass alumni, recorded three albums, The Rob McConnell Tentet (2000), Thank You, Ted (2002), and Music of the Twenties (2003).

McConnell died of liver cancer on May 1, 2010, in Toronto at the age of 75.

== Discography ==
The Boss Brass

- The Boss Brass - Rob McConnell (1968), Canadian Talent Library
- Rob McConnell's Boss Brass 2 (1969), Canadian Talent Library
- The Sound Of The Boss Brass (1970), CBC Radio Canada
- On a Cool Day (1971), Canadian Talent Library
- Rob McConnell's Boss Brass 4 (1972), Canadian Talent Library
- The Best Damn Band in the Land (1974), United Artists Records
- The Jazz Album (1976), Attic Records
- Nobody Does It Better (1977), Canadian Talent Library, Phonodisc
- Big Band Jazz (1978), Umbrella Records
- Again! (1979), Umbrella Records
- Are Ya Dancin' Disco? (1979), New Ventures
- The Singers Unlimited with Rob McConnell and The Boss Brass (1980), MPS Records
- Present Perfect (1980), MPS Records
- Tribute (1981), Pausa Records
- Live in Digital (1982), Sea Breeze, Palo Alto Records
- Big Band Jazz Volume 1 (1983), Pausa Records
- Again! Volume 1 (1983), Pausa Records
- Big Band Jazz Volume 2 (1983), Pausa Records
- All in Good Time (1983), Sea Breeze, Palo Alto Records
- Again! Volume 2 (1983), Pausa Records
- Atras Da Porta (1985), Innovation Records
- Boss Brass and Woods (1985), Innovation Records
- Mel Tormé, Rob McConnell and the Boss Brass (1986), Concord Jazz
- The Brass Is Back (1991), Concord Jazz
- Brassy and Sassy (1992), Concord Jazz
- Our 25th Year (1993), Concord Jazz
- Overtime (1994), Concord Jazz
- Don't Get Around Much Anymore (1995), Concord Jazz
- Velvet and Brass (1995), Concord Jazz
- Even Canadians Get the Blues (1996), Concord Jazz
- Rob McConnell and the Boss Brass Play the Jazz Classics (1997), Concord Jazz
- Big Band Christmas (1998), Concord Jazz
- The Concord Jazz Heritage Series (1998, compilation), Concord Jazz
- Two Originals (Brass My Soul & Tribute)(1998, compilation), MPS Records
- ...One More Time! Live At The Old Mill Inn (2008), JAZZ.FM91

The Rob McConnell Tentet

- Rob McConnell Tentet (2000), Justin Time Records
- Thank You, Ted (2002), Justin Time Records
- Music of the Twenties (2003), Justin Time Records
- Justin Time For Christmas Four (2004), Justin Time Records

Other

- A Canadian Christmas - Noël Canadien (1980, with Bob Hamper), CBC Radio Canada
- Trombone Rob (1982), Canadian Talent Library
- Mutual Street (1984, with Ed Bickert), Innovation Records
- Old Friends, New Music (1985, with Rick Wilkins, Guido Basso, Ed Bickert, Steve Wallace and Terry Clarke), Unisson Records
- The Boss of the Boss Brass (1988, orchestra with strings and woodwinds), Duke Street Records
- Live At The 1990 Concord Jazz Festival, First Set (1991, with Ed Bickert, Alan Dawson, Harry Edison, Al Grey, Gene Harris, Benny Powell and Neil Swainson), Concord Jazz
- The Rob McConnell Jive 5 (1990, with Ed Bickert, Jerry Fuller, Neil Swainson and Rick Wilkins), Concord Jazz
- Manny Albam, Rob McConnell And The SDR Big Band Featuring Herb Geller (1993), Intercord
- Trio Sketches (1994, with Ed Bickert and Neil Swainson), Concord Jazz
- Three for the Road (1997, with Ed Bickert and Don Thompson), Concord Jazz
- Riffs I Have Known (2000), Recall/Snapper Music
- Live with the Boss - Rob McConnell & Big Band Brass (2001), Black & Blue Records
- So Very Rob, Boss Brass Revisited (2003, with The SWR Big Band, recorded in Germany), Hanssler

Guest and backing appearances, arrangements, compilation inclusions

- Cool and Hot Sax - Moe Koffman Septette (1957), Jubilee Records
- Color Him Wild - Maynard Ferguson (1964), Mainstream Records
- Love Talk - Guido Basso (1971), Kanata Records, Canadian Broadcasting Corporation
- Songs for the New Industrial State - Doug Randle (2009), Kanata Records, Canadian Broadcasting Corporation
- Jazz Canadiana: All Star Jazz In Concert (1973, compilation), CBC Radio Canada
- My Heart Belongs To Me - Rick Wilkins Orchestra (1977), Phonodisc
- And All That Latin Jazz! - Guido Basso (1978), Canadian Talent Library
- Back Again - The Hi-Lo's (1979), MPS Records
- Out of the Shadows - Chris Vadala (1979), Art of Life Records
- Swing Fever - All Star Swing Band (1982), CBS Direct
- Play The Compositions And Arrangements Of Bill Holman - Vic Lewis West Coast All Stars (1989), Mole Jazz
- Let's Eat Home - Dave Frishberg (1990), Concord Jazz
- Plays Bill Holman - Vic Lewis West Coast All Stars (1993), Candid Records
- From Lush To Lively - Oliver Jones, Justin Time Records
- Lookin' Good - Dave Frishberg (2001), Concord Jazz
- Justin Time Records 20th Anniversary Compilation (2003), Justin Time Records
- Jazz Moods: Sounds Of Autumn (2004, compilation), Concord Special Products
- Jazz Moods: Jazz At The North Pole (2004, compilation), Concord Special Products
- Instant Party - Mel Tormé (2004, compilation), Concord Jazz
- I'm New Here - MHCC Jazz Band (2004), Sea Breeze
- From the Top - Music! Its Role and Importance In Our Lives (2005), Glencoe/McGraw-Hill Education
- Jazz After Dark II (2005), Playboy Jazz
- Swingchronicity - Phil Woods, DePaul University Jazz Ensemble (2007), Jazzed Media
- Just Friends - The Texas Christian University Jazz Ensemble (2009), Sea Breeze Vista Records
- The Complete Quebec Jam Session July 28, 1955 - Clifford Brown (2009), Rare Live Recordings
- The Complete 1975 Toronto Recordings - Paul Desmond Quartet (2020), Mosaic Records

== Awards and nominations ==
Juno Awards

- Nominee, Best Jazz Album, Rob McConnell and the Boss Brass The Jazz Album, Juno Awards of 1977
- Winner, Best Jazz Album, Rob McConnell and the Boss Brass, Big Band Jazz, Juno Awards of 1978
- Winner, Recording Engineer of the Year - David Green, Big Band Jazz, Juno Awards of 1978
- Nominee, Best Jazz Album, Again!, Juno Awards of 1980
- Winner, Best Jazz Album, Present Perfect, Juno Awards of 1981
- Nominee, Best Jazz Album, Live In Digital, Rob McConnell and the Boss Brass, Juno Awards of 1982
- Winner, Best Jazz Album, All In Good Time, Rob McConnell and the Boss Brass, Juno Awards of 1984
- Nominee, Best Jazz Album, Atras De Porta, Rob McConnell and the Boss Brass, Juno Awards of 1986
- Nominee, Best Jazz Album, Old Friends, New Music, The Rob McConnell Sextet, Juno Awards of 1986
- Nominee, Recording Engineer of the Year - Phil Sheridan, "Ellington", Mel Tormé, Rob McConnell and the Boss Brass, Juno Awards of 1987
- Winner, Best Jazz Album, The Brass Is Back, Rob McConnell and the Boss Brass, Juno Awards of 1992
- Nominee, Best Jazz Album, Brassy and Sassy, Rob McConnell and the Boss Brass, Juno Awards of 1993
- Nominee, Best Mainstream Jazz Album, Our 25th Year, Rob McConnell and the Boss Brass, Juno Awards of 1994
- Nominee, Best Mainstream Jazz Album, Overtime, Rob McConnell and the Boss Brass, Juno Awards of 1995
- Nominee, Best Mainstream Jazz Album, Even Canadians Get the Blues, Rob McConnell and the Boss Brass, Juno Awards of 1997
- Winner, Best Traditional Jazz Album, Rob McConnell Tentet, Rob McConnell Tentet, Juno Awards of 2001
- Nominee, Traditional Jazz Album of the Year, Thank You, Ted, Rob McConnell Tentet, Juno Awards of 2003

Grammy Awards

- Nominee, Best Jazz Instrumental Performance, Big Band, Big Band Jazz, Rob McConnell and the Boss Brass, 1979
- Nominee, Best Arrangement Accompanying Vocalist(s), "Tangerine", The Singers Unlimited with Rob McConnell and The Boss Brass, 1980
- Nominee, Best Jazz Instrumental Performance, Big Band, Present Perfect, Rob McConnell and The Boss Brass, 1981
- Nominee, Best Jazz Instrumental Performance, Big Band, "Tribute", Tribute, Rob McConnell and The Boss Brass, 1982
- Nominee, Best Jazz Instrumental Performance, Big Band, Live In Digital, Rob McConnell and The Boss Brass, 1983
- Winner, Best Jazz Instrumental Performance, Big Band, All In Good Time, Rob McConnell and The Boss Brass, 26th Annual Grammy Awards, 1984
- Nominee, Best Arrangement On An Instrumental, "I Got Rhythm", All In Good Time, Rob McConnell and The Boss Brass, 1984
- Nominee, Best Large Jazz Ensemble Performance, The Brass Is Back, Rob McConnell and The Boss Brass, 1992
- Winner, Best Arrangement on an Instrumental, "Strike Up The Band", Brassy And Sassy, Rob McConnell, 35th Annual Grammy Awards, 1993
- Nominee, Best Large Jazz Ensemble Performance, Brassy And Sassy, Rob McConnell and The Boss Brass, 1993
- Nominee, Best Large Jazz Ensemble Performance, Our 25th Year, Rob McConnell and The Boss Brass, 1994
- Winner, Best Instrumental Arrangement With Accompanying Vocal(s), "I Get A Kick Out Of You", Mel Tormé, Rob McConnell and the Boss Brass, Rob McConnell, 38th Annual Grammy Awards, 1996
- Nominee, Best Large Jazz Ensemble Performance, Even Canadians Get The Blues, Rob McConnell and The Boss Brass, 1997
- Nominee, Best Instrumental Arrangement, "What Are You Doing New Year's Eve?", Big Band Christmas, Rob McConnell and the Boss Brass, Rob McConnell, 1999
- Nominee, Best Large Jazz Ensemble Album, Rob McConnell Tentet, Rob McConnell Tentet, 2002
- Nominee, Best Instrumental Arrangement, "Autumn In New York", So Very Rob, Boss Brass Revisited, Rob McConnell And The SWR Big Band, Rob McConnell, 2004

Canadian National Jazz Awards

- Arranger of the Year, Rob McConnell, 2002
- Trombonist of the Year, Rob McConnell, 2002
- Arranger of the Year, Rob McConnell, 2003
- Trombonist of the Year, Rob McConnell, 2003
- Acoustic Group of the Year, The Rob McConnell Tentet, 2003
- Big Band of the Year, The Rob McConnell Tentet, 2003
- Arranger of the Year, Rob McConnell, 2004
- Trombonist of the Year, Rob McConnell, 2004
- Big Band of the Year, The Rob McConnell Tentet, 2004
- Big Band of the Year, The Rob McConnell Tentet, 2005
- Trombonist of the Year, Rob McConnell, 2006
- Big Band of the Year, The Rob McConnell Tentet, 2006

== Honours ==
- Awarded, Honorary Doctor of Letters, St. Francis Xavier University, 1986
- Awarded, SOCAN Jazz Award, Society of Composers, Authors and Music Publishers of Canada, 1992
- Awarded, Prix Oscar Peterson, Montreal International Jazz Festival, 1997
- Inducted, Canadian Music Hall of Fame, Juno Awards of 1997
- Named, Officer of the Order of Canada, 1998
- Awarded, SOCAN National Achievement Award, Society of Composers, Authors and Music Publishers of Canada, 1999

== See also ==
- Music of Canada
- Canadian Music Hall of Fame
