= These Foolish Things (Remind Me of You) =

1935 song by Jack Strachey and Eric Maschwitz

Song
- Published: 1935 by Boosey & Hawkes
- Composer: Jack Strachey
- Lyricist: Eric Maschwitz as Holt Marvell

"These Foolish Things (Remind Me of You)" is a standard with lyrics by Eric Maschwitz, writing under the pseudonym Holt Marvell, and music by Jack Strachey, both Englishmen. Harry Link, an American, sometimes appears as a co-writer; his input was probably limited to an alternative bridge which many performers prefer.

It is one of a group of "Mayfair songs", like "A Nightingale Sang in Berkeley Square". Maschwitz wrote the song under his pen name, Holt Marvell, at the behest of Joan Carr for a late-evening revue broadcast by the BBC. The copyright was lodged in 1936. British cabaret singer Jean Ross, with whom Maschwitz had a youthful liaison, is often credited as the muse for the song.

== Creation ==
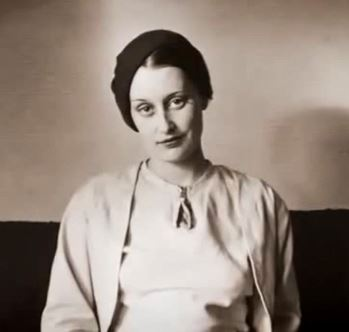
Jean Ross, a British singer and actress, purportedly inspired Maschwitz's lyrics.

Although Maschwitz's wife Hermione Gingold speculated in her autobiography that the haunting jazz standard was written for either her or actress Anna May Wong, Maschwitz himself contradicted such claims. Maschwitz instead cited "fleeting memories of [a] young love" as inspiring the song. Most sources, including the Oxford Dictionary of National Biography, posit cabaret singer Jean Ross, with whom Maschwitz had a youthful romantic liaison, as the muse for the song.

When the song was written, Maschwitz was Head of Variety at the BBC. It is a list song (Maschwitz calls it a "catalogue song" in his autobiography), in this case for the various things that remind the singer of a lost love. The lyrics—the verse and three choruses—were written by Maschwitz during the course of one Sunday morning at his flat in London between sips of coffee and vodka. Within hours of crafting the lyrics, he dictated them over the phone to Jack Strachey, and they arranged to meet the same evening to discuss the next step.

== Rise to popularity ==
The song was not an immediate success, and Keith Prowse, Maschwitz's agent, refused to publish it, releasing the copyright to Maschwitz himself –a stroke of luck for the lyricist. Writing in 1957, he claimed to have made £40,000 from the song. Despite being featured in Spread it Abroad, a London revue of 1936 from Herbert Farjeon, it aroused no interest until the famous Grenada-born pianist and singer Leslie "Hutch" Hutchinson discovered it on top of a piano in Maschwitz's office at the BBC. Hutch liked it and recorded it, whereupon it became a global hit. This first recording by Hutch was on His Master's Voice label in 1936. Popular versions in the USA in 1936 alone were recorded by Benny Goodman, Teddy Wilson with Billie Holiday, Nat Brandywynne, Carroll Gibbons, and Joe Sanders. (Billie Holiday's rendering of the song with Teddy Wilson's orchestra was a favorite of the poet Philip Larkin, who said "I have always thought the words were a little pseudo-poetic, but Billie sings them with such passionate conviction that I think they really become poetry.") Holiday's version of the song peaked at No. 5 on the Billboard Pop Songs chart.

=== French version ===
The song was translated into French under the title Ces petites choses ("These little things") and recorded by Jean Sablon in 1936 and by Ann Savoy in 2007, respectively.

== Cover versions ==
"These Foolish Things"

Single by James Brown
- B-side: "(Can You) Feel It Part 1"
- Released: June 1963
- Genre: Rhythm and blues, traditional pop
- Length: 2:51
- Label: King
- Songwriters: Eric Maschwitz; Jack Strachey; Harry Link

James Brown charting singles chronology
"Prisoner of Love" (1963)	"These Foolish Things" (1963)	"Signed, Sealed, and Delivered" (1963)

Audio video
- "These Foolish Things Remind Me Of You" on YouTube

Many other versions have been recorded with various vocal arrangements including, but not limited to:

- Bing Crosby (recorded 15 December 1944).
- Nat King Cole (on Just One of Those Things in 1957).
- In 1953, Billy Ward and his Dominoes recorded their version which reached No. 5 on the National Best Sellers chart.
- Dave Brubeck (many recordings, as it was a favorite of Paul Desmond; the earliest in 1953).
- Mel Tormé (on Tormé Meets the British in 1957).
- Connie Francis included the song on her 1959 album My Thanks to You.
- Frank Sinatra, (Point of No Return, 1961).
- James Brown recorded the song three times, including a 1963 recording with strings that charted at No. 25 R&B and No. 50 Pop.
- Sammy Davis Jr ("When the Feeling Hits You!", 1965).
- Bryan Ferry covered the Dorothy Dickson version of the song for the title track of his first solo album These Foolish Things by Island Records in 1973.
- Rod Stewart (US AC #13, 2002).
- In 2005, Rick Astley covered the song for his sixth studio album Portrait.
- In 2015, Cassandra Wilson covered the song on her album Coming Forth by Day.
- Bob Dylan covered the song on his album Triplicate (2017).

== In popular culture ==
- It was sung by Florence Marly in the Humphrey Bogart film Tokyo Joe (1949).
- In the 1949 film Train of Events, the song is playing on a gramophone while Peter Finch's character strangles his estranged wife.
- The version sung by Lew Stone and his Band, plays in the background, in two episodes of Strangers and Brothers (1984).
- Bertrand Tavernier's 1990 film Daddy Nostalgie features this song as its theme, and it was released in the UK under the title These Foolish Things. The song is featured several times throughout the film, and the soundtrack includes three versions: a duet performed by lead actress Jane Birkin and Jimmy Rowles, a piano solo by Jimmy Rowles, and a vocal performance by Jimmy Rowles accompanied by his own piano playing.

== Bibliography ==
- Brown, Helen (18 February 2016). "Muse, The Witham, Barnard Castle". The Northern Echo.
- Frost, Peter (31 December 2013). "Jean Ross". Morning Star.
- Gingold, Hermione (1989). How to Grow Old Disgracefully. New York: St. Martin's Press. p. 54. ISBN 9780575044777.
- Maschwitz, Eric (1957). No Chip on My Shoulder. London: Herbert Jenkins. pp. 77–79.
- Parker, Peter (September 2004). "Ross, Jean Iris (1911–1973)". Oxford Dictionary of National Biography (online ed.). Oxford University Press. doi:10.1093/ref:odnb/74425. (Subscription, Wikipedia Library access or UK public library membership required.)
