= It Happened in Sun Valley =

1941 song by Harry Warren

1941 RCA Bluebird 78, B-11263-A.

1941 sheet music, Leo Feist, New York.

"It Happened in Sun Valley" is a 1941 song composed by Harry Warren, with lyrics by Mack Gordon. It was recorded and featured by Glenn Miller and his orchestra in the movie Sun Valley Serenade.

== Background ==
Glenn Miller and His Orchestra released the song as an RCA Bluebird 78 rpm single, B-11263-A, in 1941 as a tie-in with the movie, which also featured Glenn Miller and his Orchestra in a performance of the song onscreen with the cast. The B side was "The Kiss Polka", also from the Sun Valley Serenade soundtrack.

While the song makes no mention of Christmas in its lyrics, the winter theme has caused it to become associated with the holiday. Cover versions have been recorded by such artists as André Previn (on his 1955 album Let's Get Away from It All), Jo Stafford (on her 1956 album Ski Trails), the Randy Van Horne Singers (on their 1960 album Sleighride), and Mel Tormé (on his 1992 album Christmas Songs). The song is performed in character by South Park characters Stan Marsh and Wendy Testaburger as part of the 1999 holiday album "Mr. Hankey's Christmas Classics."

== Chart history ==
The Glenn Miller RCA Bluebird recording, B-11263-A, with "Vocal Refrain by Paula Kelly, Ray Eberle, Tex Beneke, and The Modernaires, reached #18 on the Billboard chart in 1941.

== Sources ==
- Flower, John (1972). Moonlight Serenade: a bio-discography of the Glenn Miller Civilian Band. New Rochelle, NY: Arlington House. ISBN 0-87000-161-2.
- Miller, Glenn (1943). Glenn Miller's Method for Orchestral Arranging. New York: Mutual Music Society. ASIN: B0007DMEDQ
- Simon, George Thomas (1980). Glenn Miller and His Orchestra. New York: Da Capo paperback. ISBN 0-306-80129-9.
- Simon, George Thomas (1971). Simon Says. New York: Galahad. ISBN 0-88365-001-0.
- Schuller, Gunther (1991). Volume 2 of The Swing Era:the Development of Jazz, 1930–1945 /. New York: Oxford University Press. ISBN 0-19-507140-9.
