= Love in Bloom (song) =

"Love in Bloom" is a popular song with music by Ralph Rainger and lyrics by Leo Robin, published in 1934. It was introduced in the film She Loves Me Not by Bing Crosby and Kitty Carlisle. It remained familiar for many years thereafter as the theme song of Jack Benny, played at the opening and closing of his radio and television programs.

== Background ==
The song was first recorded by Bing Crosby on July 5, 1934 with Irving Aaronson and his Commanders for Brunswick Records. The same year, it was one of the nominees for the inaugural "Best Song" Academy Award when it lost out to "The Continental". Crosby re-recorded the song for his 1954 album Bing: A Musical Autobiography.

Other popular versions of the song in 1934 were by Paul Whiteman (vocal by Jack Fulton), Guy Lombardo and by Hal Kemp (vocal by Skinnay Ennis).

"Love in Bloom" became the theme song of Jack Benny who was known for playing it off-key on his violin. Kitty Carlisle had hoped to adopt it as her theme song, but its swift comic association with Benny spoiled those plans.

The 1935 Paramount comedy Love in Bloom with Burns and Allen derived its name from the song, although the song itself was not included in the film. Fleischer Studios, however, made frequent use of the tune in various Popeye cartoons, such as I Yam Love Sick (1938) and Hello, How Am I (1939). It was also used in several other Fleischer productions, in particular Time for Love (1935).

The song has been recorded by other artists, including Al Bowlly with Lew Stone and his Orchestra in 1934, Spike Jones and his City Slickers (1947), The Platters (for their 1959 album Remember When?), Erroll Garner (1961) and Mel Tormé for his 1994 album A Tribute to Bing Crosby. It is mentioned in Charles Trenet's song, "Boum!".
