= Mel Tormé Sings Sunday in New York & Other Songs About New York =

Studio album by Mel Tormé
- Released: 1963
- Recorded: December 2, 4, 7, 1963
- Genre: Jazz
- Length: 39:08
- Label: Atlantic
- Producer: Michael Cox

Mel Tormé chronology
Comin' Home Baby! (1962)	Mel Tormé Sings Sunday in New York & Other Songs About New York (1963)	That's All (1964)

Professional ratings
Review scores
Source	Rating
Allmusic	4/5 stars
The Penguin Guide to Jazz Recordings	3.5/4 stars

Mel Tormé Sings Sunday in New York & Other Songs About New York is a 1963 studio album by Mel Tormé, of songs about New York City.

== Track listing ==
1. "Sunday in New York" (Carroll Coates, Peter Nero) – 2:34
2. "Autumn in New York" (Vernon Duke) – 3:24
3. "Lullaby of Birdland" (George Shearing, George David Weiss) - 2:20
4. "Broadway" (Billy Bird, Teddy McRae, Henri Woode) - 2:08
5. "The Brooklyn Bridge" (Sammy Cahn, Jule Styne) – 2:44
6. "Let Me Off Uptown" (Earl Bostic, Redd Evans) – 2:37
7. "Forty Second Street" (Al Dubin, Harry Warren) – 2:25
8. "Sidewalks of New York" (Charles B. Lawlor, James W. Blake) - 2:09
9. "Harlem Nocturne (Nocturne for the Blues)" (Earle Hagen, Dick Rogers) – 3:55
10. "New York, New York" (Leonard Bernstein, Betty Comden, Adolph Green) – 2:23
11. "There's a Broken Heart for Every Light on Broadway" (Fred Fisher, Howard Johnson) – 2:22
12. "Manhattan" (Lorenz Hart, Richard Rodgers) – 3:12
13. "My Time of Day" (Frank Loesser) – 1:21

== Performance ==
Mel Tormé - vocals

Johnny Williams:	arranged and conducted tracks # 1,4,6,8
Dick Hazard:	arranged and conducted tracks # 2,7,9,12
Shorty Rodgers:	arranged and conducted tracks # 3,5,10,11
Bull Putnam:	Recording Engineer
Loring Eutenmey:	Cover Photo
Nesuhi Ertegun:	Supervision

Mel Tormé Drums, Primary Artist, Vocals Violins Harry Bluestone, Israel Baker, Marvin Limonick, Gerald Vinci, James Getzoff, Lou Raderman, Paul Shure, Henry Roth Viola Alvin Dinkin, Allan Harshman Cello Margaret Aue, Edgar Lustgarten Harp Dorothy Remsen Woodwind Gene Cipriano, Buddy Collette, Paul Horn, Ronnie Lang, John Lowe. Arnold Koblentz (Oboe) Trumpet Al Porcino, Frank Beach, Ray Triscari, Stu Williamson Trombone Lew McCreary, Richard Taylor, Dick Nash, Lloyd Ulyate John Kitzmiller Tuba Dave Barbour Guitar Jimmy Rowles Piano Joe Mondragon Bass Shelly Manne Drums Arranger, Conductor Johnny Williams, Dick Hazard, Shorty Rogers

== Other Releases ==
The album was re-released in 1983 as Songs of New York.
