= Songs for Any Taste =

Live album by Mel Tormé
- Released: 1957
- Recorded: 1957
- Genre: Vocal jazz
- Length: 26:22
- Label: Bethlehem

Mel Tormé chronology
Mel Tormé's California Suite (1957)	Songs for Any Taste (1957)	Tormé Meets the British (1957)

Professional ratings
Review scores
Source	Rating
Allmusic	4/5 stars

Songs for Any Taste is a 1957 live album by Mel Tormé, recorded at the Crescendo Club.

Interspersed with studio recordings, this is one of three albums that Tormé released with material from his appearances at the club.

A 1960 review in The Tatler and Bystander by Gerald David Lascelles praised Tormé as matching the "swinging vitality" of Frank Sinatra and "[taking] off a long limb in the cause of jazz" as he "underlines the whole with a sense of humour". Lascelles praised the "biting" string arrangements of Marty Paich on Songs for Any Taste. It was recommended by Howard Keith in a 1960 review in the Sunday Dispatch and was a 'Pic of the Discs' in The Sunday Mirror in March 1960, and recommended in The Coventry Evening Telegraph.

The album was reissued in 2001. A 2001 review of Songs for Any Taste in The Philadelphia Inquirer described it as"remind[ing] anyone within earshot of [Torme's] glittering talent" and that it was a "beguiling set". The short 26 minute length of the album was lamented.

== Track listing ==
1. "Autumn Leaves" (Joseph Kosma, Johnny Mercer, Jacques Prévert) – 1:32
2. "Tenderly" (Walter Gross, Jack Lawrence) – 2:31
3. "I Wish I Were in Love Again" (Lorenz Hart, Richard Rodgers) – 2:18
4. "It's De-Lovely" (Cole Porter) – 2:42
5. "It's All Right with Me" (Porter) – 4:28
6. "Manhattan" (Hart, Rodgers) – 3:14
7. "Taking a Chance on Love" (Vernon Duke, Ted Fetter, John La Touche) – 2:28
8. "Home by the Sea" (Fetter, Lewing) – 1:24
9. "I Got Plenty o' Nuttin'" (George Gershwin, Ira Gershwin, DuBose Heyward) – 3:24
10. "Nobody's Heart" (Hart, Rodgers) – 2:21

== Personnel ==
- Mel Tormé - vocals, drums
- Don Fagerquist - trumpet
- Howard McGhee
- Larry Bunker - accordion, bongos, vibraphone
- Max Bennett - double bass
- Stan Levey - drums
- Mel Lewis - drums
- Ralph Sharon - piano
- Marty Paich - arranger, conductor
