= The Mills Brothers =

American jazz and pop vocal quartet

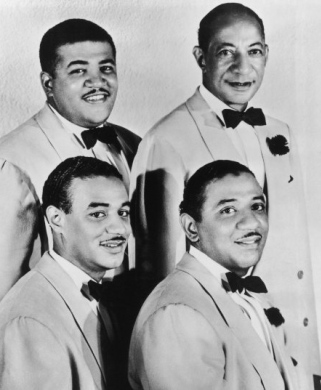
- The Mills Brothers in 1944. Clockwise from the top-left: Harry Mills, John Mills, Herbert Mills, Donald Mills

Background information
- Origin: Piqua, Ohio
- Genres: Vocal jazz, traditional pop
- Years active: 1925–present
- Labels: Brunswick; Decca; Dot; Ranwood; London
- Members: John Mills II; Randy Taylor
- Past members: John Mills Jr.; Herbert Mills; Harry Mills; Donald Mills; John Mills Sr.; Norman Brown; Elmer Hopper
- Website: www.themillsbrothers.com

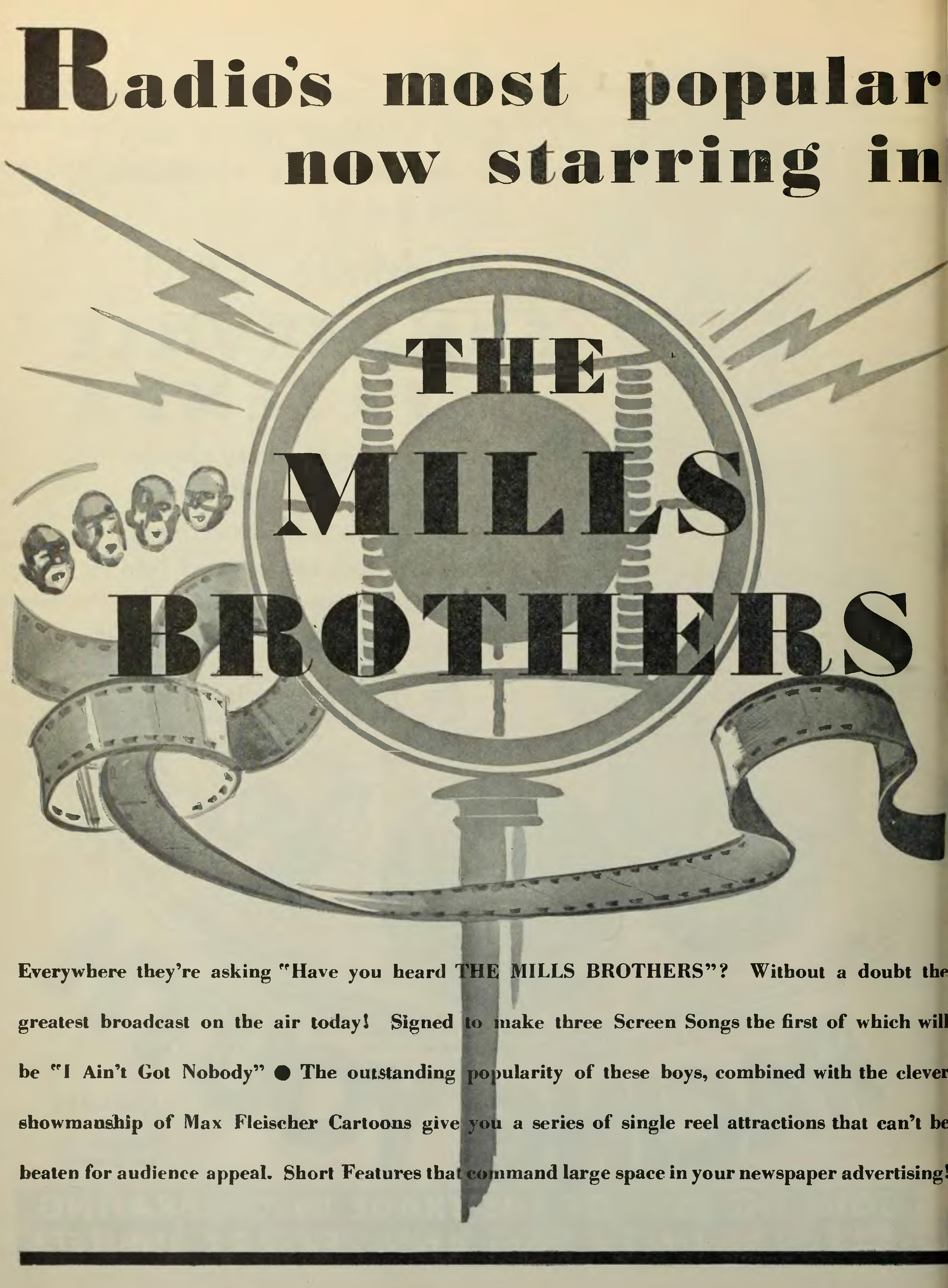
The Mills Brothers ad in The Film Daily, 1932

The Mills Brothers, sometimes billed The Four Mills Brothers and originally known as Four Boys and a Guitar, are an American vocal jazz and traditional pop vocal quartet who made more than 2,000 recordings that sold more than 50 million copies and garnered at least three dozen gold records.

The Mills Brothers were the first black artists to have their own show on national network radio (on CBS in 1930); they made appearances in film; and were the first to have a No. 1 hit on the Billboard singles chart, with "Paper Doll" in 1943. They were inducted into the Vocal Group Hall of Fame in 1998.

== Early years ==
The Mills Brothers were born into a family of nine in Piqua, Ohio, United States.

The quartet consisted of Donald (lead tenor vocals, April 29, 1915 – November 13, 1999), Herbert (tenor vocals, April 2, 1912 – April 12, 1989), Harry (baritone vocals, August 19, 1913 – June 28, 1982), and John Jr. (tenor guitar, double bass, bass vocals; October 19, 1910 – January 24, 1936).

Their father, John Hutchinson Mills (February 11, 1882 – December 8, 1967), was a barber with his own shop and founded a barbershop quartet called "The Four Kings of Harmony". He was the son of William Hutchinson Mills and Cecilia Simms who lived in Bellefonte, Pennsylvania.

As the boys grew older, they began singing in the choir of the Cyrene African Methodist Episcopal Church and in the Park Avenue Baptist Church in Piqua. After lessons at the Spring Street Grammar School, they gathered in front of their father's barbershop or on the corner to perform. They entered an amateur contest at May's Opera House but while on stage Harry realized he had lost his kazoo. He improvised by cupping his hand over his mouth and mimicking the sound of trumpet. The brothers liked the idea and worked it into their act. John, the bass vocalist, would imitate the tuba. Harry, a baritone, imitated the trumpet, Herbert became the second trumpet, and Donald the trombone. John accompanied the four-part harmony on ukulele and then guitar. They practiced imitating orchestras they heard on the radio.

== Rise to stardom ==
I Ain't Got Nobody, a 1932 Fleischer Studios/Paramount Pictures Screen Songs cartoon short, featuring both a musical score by and live-action segments starring The Mills Brothers.

In 1928, after playing May's Opera House in Piqua between Rin Tin Tin features, the brothers accompanied the Harold Greenameyer Band to Cincinnati for an audition with radio station WLW. The station did not hire the band, but did hire the Mills brothers. With the help of Seger Ellis, a WLW Cincinnati DJ, they became local radio stars, and got their major break when Duke Ellington and his Orchestra played a date in Cincinnati. When the youngsters sang for Duke, he called Tommy Rockwell at Okeh Records, who signed them and brought the group to New York City.

In September 1930, Ralph Wonders urged broadcasting executive William S. Paley, at CBS Radio in New York, to turn on his office speaker and listen to an audition of four young men. For the audition they were "The Mills Brothers", but they had been known by many other names. They were billed as "The Steamboat Four" when they sang for Sohio. They had been called the "Four Boys and a Guitar" on their Sunday shows. When Paley heard their performance, he immediately went downstairs and put them on the air. The next day, the Mills Brothers signed a three-year contract and became the first African-Americans to have a network show on radio.

Their first recording for Brunswick Records, the Original Dixieland Jass Band standard "Tiger Rag", became a nationwide best-seller and a no. 1 hit on the charts in a version with lyrics by Harry DaCosta. It sold over one million copies, and was awarded a gold disc by the RIAA.

Other hits followed – "Goodbye Blues", their theme song, "Nobody's Sweetheart", "Ole Rockin' Chair", "Lazy River", "How'm I Doin'", and others. They remained on Brunswick until late 1934, when they signed with Decca, where they stayed well into the 1950s. On all of their Brunswick records, as well as the early Deccas, the label stated, "No musical instruments or mechanical devices used on this recording other than one guitar".

They were a hit on CBS in 1930–1931, particularly when they co-starred on the popular The Fleischmann's Yeast Hour hosted by Rudy Vallee. From 1932 to 1933 they had a radio series in which they were billed as the "Four Boys and a Guitar". Before their show announcers explained to listeners that the only instrument was a guitar, as the vocal effects made many listeners think they were brass instruments. The brothers were sponsored by Standard Oil, Procter & Gamble, Crisco, and Crosley Radio. They began appearing in films. Their first, The Big Broadcast (Paramount Pictures, 1932) was an all-star radio revue that included Bing Crosby, Cab Calloway, and the Boswell Sisters. They also made three Screen Songs "bouncing ball" cartoon shorts for Fleischer Studios and Paramount.

Between 1933 and 1935, the Brothers starred with Crosby for Woodbury Soap in Bing Crosby Entertains, making 27 appearances in all on the CBS radio show. They also recorded their classics "Lazy Bones", "Sweet Sue", "Lulu's Back In Town", "Bye-Bye Blackbird", "Sleepy Head", and "Shoe Shine Boy". Their film appearances included Twenty Million Sweethearts (Warner Bros., 1934), Operator 13 (MGM, 1934) and Broadway Gondolier (Warner Bros., 1935).

Dinah, 1932

In 1934, The Mills Brothers became the first African-Americans to give a command performance before British royalty. They performed at the Regal Theatre for a special audience: King George V and Queen Mary. While performing in England, John Jr. became ill. He died in the beginning of 1936. Their father, John Sr. replaced John Jr. as the bass and tuba. At this time, Bernard Addison joined the Brothers as their guitar player.

The Mills Brothers recorded repeatedly with Louis Armstrong. The first session was in April 1937 (Decca 1245).

== War years ==
Through 1939 the group enjoyed remarkable success in Europe. Herbert recalled,

We left England for the last time just three days before war was declared on Germany and the only boat we could get was to Australia. We were overseas from then on except for two months in 1940 and then we went back to South America. We didn't get back until 1941. In the meantime the Ink Spots were coming up, and people had sort of forgotten us.

In the period between John Jr.'s death and their return to the States, they re-recorded "Lazy River". It was followed by "Someday You'll Want Me to Want You", "Swing Is the Thing", "Long About Midnight", "Organ Grinder's Swing", and "The Song is Ended". They honored Duke Ellington with a swing version of his "Caravan", and then produced a series of classic recordings; "South of the Border", which they performed in a tour of South America, along with "Ain't Misbehavin'", "It Don't Mean a Thing", "Jeepers Creepers", "Three Little Fishies", and "Basin Street Blues".

During this era, there was also a brief time when the group performed with a non‑family singer. Gene Smith served as a stand-in for one year when Harry was drafted into the Army. Although Smith's solo singing did not particularly resemble the group's usual sound, he was able to harmonize well until the fourth brother's return. Smith is noticeable in a number of the Mills Brothers' film appearances.

Returning to the States, the Brothers were anxious for a hit and recorded "I'll be Around" in 1943. Donald Mills chose "Paper Doll" as the B-side of the record. "I'll Be Around" became a hit, then a disk jockey turned the record over. "Paper Doll", recorded in fifteen minutes, sold six million copies and became the group's biggest hit.

== Postwar years ==
The rise of rock and roll did little to decrease the Mills Brothers' popularity. "Glow Worm" jumped to number two on the pop charts in 1952. It was the fifth million selling record for the Mills Brothers. The track also peaked at No. 10 in the UK Singles Chart in January 1953. "Opus One", an updated version of the Tommy Dorsey hit, was soon on the charts as well, followed by "You're Nobody till Somebody Loves You", "The Jones Boy", "Yellow Bird", "Standing on the Corner", and "If I Had My Way".

In 1956, John Sr., when he was 74, stopped touring with the group. As a trio, the Mills Brothers were frequent guests on television talk shows and variety shows. After leaving Decca for Dot Records, they had a hit in 1958 with a version of "Get a Job", originally recorded by The Silhouettes. They reached the charts with "Yellow Bird" two years before Arthur Lyman's version was a Top Ten hit. "Cab Driver", written by Carson Parks and recorded in 1968, was their last hit (No. 23 Pop, No. 3 Easy Listening).

== Later years ==
The Mills Brothers' fiftieth anniversary in show business was celebrated in 1976 with a tribute at the Dorothy Chandler Pavilion in Los Angeles, hosted by Bing Crosby. At the time, Harry was almost blind because of diabetes.

As a trio, Herbert, Harry and Donald continued performing on the oldies circuit until Harry's death in 1982. Herbert and Donald continued until Herbert's death in 1989. Then, Donald began performing with his son, John II. In 1998 the Recording Academy recognized the Mills family's contributions to popular music when it presented Donald, as the sole surviving member, with a Grammy Award for Lifetime Achievement.

After Donald's death of pneumonia on November 13, 1999, John II became the next family member to tour under the name "The Mills Brothers" with Elmer Hopper, who had previously sung lead with Paul Robi's Platters. They were at times joined by John II's eldest brother, Don Mills, Jr. Following Hopper's death on May 5, 2019, John II started performing with Randy Taylor as a featured vocalist.

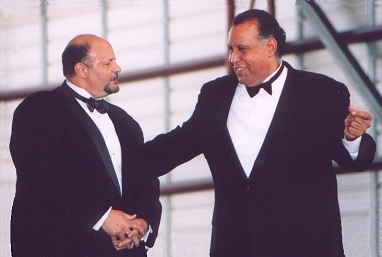
The Mills Brothers in concert, March 2005

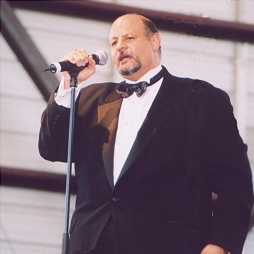
John Mills, son, grandson and nephew of the original group's members

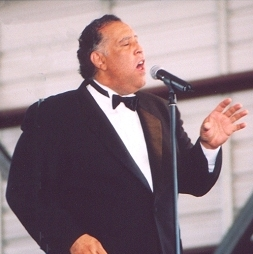
Elmer Hopper, who spent 21 years with The Platters

== Discography ==
- Famous Barber Shop Ballads Volume One (Decca, 1946)
- Famous Barber Shop Ballads Volume Two (Decca, 1949)
- Souvenir Album (Decca, 1950)
- Wonderful Words (Decca, 1951)
- Meet the Mills Brothers (Decca, 1953)
- Four Boys and a Guitar (Decca, 1954)
- Louis Armstrong and the Mills Brothers (Decca, 1954)
- Singin' and Swingin' (Decca, 1956)
- Memory Lane (Decca, 1956)
- "Ninety-Eight Cents" and "I'm the Guy" [single, 45 RPM] (Decca, 1956)
- One Dozen Roses (Decca, 1957)
- The Mills Brothers in Hi-Fi: Barbershop Ballads (Decca, 1958)
- In a Mellow Tone (Vocalion, 1958)
- Mmmm...The Mills Brothers (Dot, 1958)
- Great Hits (Dot, 1958)
- Sing (London, 1959)
- Merry Christmas (Dot, 1959)
- Greatest Barbershop Hits (Dot, 1959)
- Let Me Call You Sweetheart (Dot, 1959)
- Great Hits (Dot, 1958)
- Glow with the Mills Brothers (Decca, 1959)
- Harmonizin' With (Decca, 1959)
- Barbershop Harmony (Decca, 1960)
- San Antonio Rose (Dot, 1961)
- Yellow Bird (Dot, 1961)
- Great Hawaiian Hits (Dot, 1961)
- Sing Beer Barrel Polka and Other Golden Hits (Dot, 1962)
- The End of the World (Dot, 1963)
- Say Si Si (Dot, 1964)
- Gems by the Mills Brothers (Dot, 1964)
- Sing for You (Hamilton, 1964)
- The Mills Brothers Today! (Dot, 1965)
- The Mills Brothers in Tivoli (Dot, 1966)
- These Are the Mills Brothers (Dot, 1966)
- Anytime! (Pickwick, 1967)
- The Board of Directors with Count Basie (Dot, 1967)
- London Rhythm (Ace of Clubs, 1967)
- The Board of Directors Annual Report with Count Basie (Dot, 1968)
- My Shy Violet (Dot, 1968)
- Fortuosity with Sy Oliver (Dot, 1968)
- Dream a Little Dream of Me (Pickwick, 1968)
- Till We Meet Again (Pickwick, 1968)
- Dream (Dot, 1969)
- The Mills Brothers in Motion (Dot, 1969)
- Cab Driver, Paper Doll, My Shy Violet (Pickwick, 1969)
- No Turnin' Back (Paramount, 1970)
- What a Wonderful World (Paramount, 1972)
- A Donut and a Dream (Paramount, 1972)
- Louis and the Mills Brothers (MCA Coral, 1973)
- Half a Sixpence with Count Basie (Vogue, 1973)
- Opus One (Rediffusion, 1973)
- Cab Driver (Ranwood, 1974)
- Inspiration (ABC Songbird, 1974)
- 50th Anniversary (Ranwood, 1976)
- The Mills Brothers (Pickwick, 1976)
- Command Performance! (Ranwood, 1981)
- Copenhagen '81 (51 West, 1981)

== Film appearances ==
- The Big Broadcast (1932)
- I Ain't Got Nobody (1932)
- Dinah (1933)
- When Yuba Plays the Rhumba on the Tuba (1933)
- Operator 13 (1934) with Marion Davies and Gary Cooper
- Strictly Dynamite (1934)
- Twenty Million Sweethearts (1934)
- Broadway Gondolier (1935)
- Sing as You Swing (1937)
- Chatterbox (1943)
- He's My Guy (1943)
- Hit Tune Jamboree (1943)
- Reveille with Beverly (1943)
- Rhythm Parade (1943)
- Cowboy Canteen (1944)
- Lazy River (1944)
- The Fight Never Ends (1947)
- Daddy's Little Girl (1950)
- When You're Smiling (1950)
- The Mills Brothers on Parade (1956)

== Other references ==
The Mills Brothers' music features prominently in the work of Dennis Potter, most notably in his 1986 series The Singing Detective. The song "You Always Hurt the One You Love" was featured in the 2010 video game Bioshock 2
