= A Tribute to Bing Crosby =

Studio album by Mel Tormé
- Released: 1994
- Recorded: May 12–17, 1994, New York City, New York
- Genre: Vocal jazz
- Length: 61:09
- Label: Concord
- Producer: Carl Jefferson

Mel Tormé chronology
Sing Sing Sing (1992)	A Tribute to Bing Crosby (1994)	Velvet & Brass (1995)

A Tribute to Bing Crosby is a 1994 studio album by Mel Tormé, recorded as a tribute to the singer Bing Crosby. "Without a Word of Warning" was nominated for the Academy Award for Best instrumental arrangement with accompanying vocals by Alan Broadbent at the 37th Annual Grammy Awards.

Professional ratings
Review scores
Source	Rating
Allmusic	2/5 stars

== Track listing ==
1. "This Is My Night to Dream"/"It Must Be True" (Gus Arnheim, Harry Barris, Johnny Burke)/(Gordon Clifford, James V. Monaco) – 3:23
2. "Moonlight Becomes You" (Johnny Burke, Jimmy Van Heusen) – 3:47
3. "I Can't Escape from You" (Leo Robin, Richard A. Whiting) – 3:46
4. "With Every Breath I Take" (Ralph Rainger, Robin) – 3:47
5. "A Man and His Dream" (Burke, Monaco) – 4:10
6. "Without a Word of Warning" (Mack Gordon, Harry Revel) – 3:54
7. "May I?" (Gordon, Revel) – 3:40
8. "Please" (Rainger, Robin) – 3:45
9. "Thanks" (Sam Coslow, Arthur Johnston) – 3:19
10. "Don't Let That Moon Get Away" (Burke, Monaco) – 2:57
11. "Soon" (Lorenz Hart, Richard Rodgers) – 4:13
12. "It's Easy to Remember"/"Adios" (Rodgers, Hart)/(Enrico Madriguera, Eddie Woods) – 4:13
13. "Love in Bloom" (Rainger, Robin) – 3:38
14. "The Day You Came Along" (Coslow, Johnston) – 4:06
15. "Pennies from Heaven" (Burke, Johnston) – 4:26
16. "Learn to Croon" (Coslow, Johnston) – 4:05

== Personnel ==
- Mel Tormé – vocals
- Ken Peplowski – clarinet, tenor saxophone
- Randy Sandke – trumpet, flugelhorn
- Murray Adler – violin, concert Master
- Marilyn Baker – viola
- Paula Hochhalter – cello
- John Colianni – piano
- Howard Alden – guitar
- John Leitham – double bass
- Donny Osborne – drums
- Alan Broadbent – conductor
