= An Evening with Mel Tormé =

Live album by Mel Tormé
- Released: 1996
- Recorded: July 23, 1996
- Genre: Vocal jazz
- Length: 55:07
- Label: Concord

Mel Tormé chronology
Velvet & Brass (1995)	An Evening with Mel Tormé (1996)	Mel Tormé Live at the Playboy Jazz Festival (2002)

Professional ratings
Review scores
Source	Rating
Allmusic	3/5 stars

An Evening with Mel Tormé is a 1996 live album by Mel Tormé. This was Tormé's final recording before a stroke ended his career.

== Track listing ==
1. "Just One of Those Things"/"On Green Dolphin Street" (Cole Porter)/(Bronislaw Kaper, Ned Washington) – 4:56
2. "You Make Me Feel So Young" (Mack Gordon, Josef Myrow) – 3:50
3. "A Nightingale Sang in Berkeley Square" (Eric Maschwitz, Manning Sherwin) – 4:19
4. "Pick Yourself Up" (Dorothy Fields, Jerome Kern) – 4:41
5. "Stardust" (Hoagy Carmichael, Mitchell Parish) – 5:03
6. "Love for Sale" (Porter) – 5:09
7. "Since I Fell for You" (Buddy Johnson) – 4:42
8. Benny Goodman medley: "Three Little Words"/"Slipped Disc"/"Smooth One"/"Rachel's Dream" (Harry Ruby, Burt Kalmar)/(Benny Goodman)/(Goodman)/(Goodman, Bert Reisfeld) – 3:09
9. "I Remember You"/"It's Easy to Remember (And So Hard to Forget)" (Johnny Mercer, Victor Schertzinger)/(Lorenz Hart, Richard Rodgers) – 5:07
10. "Lover, Come Back to Me" (Oscar Hammerstein II, Sigmund Romberg) – 3:48
11. "Stairway to the Stars" (Matty Malneck, Parish, Frank Signorelli) – 4:12
12. "Oh, Lady Be Good!" (George Gershwin, Ira Gershwin) – 3:41
13. "Ev'ry Time We Say Goodbye" (Porter) – 2:30

== Personnel ==
- Mel Tormé – vocals
- Mike Renzi – piano
- John Leitham – double bass
- Donny Osborne – drums
