= That's All (Mel Tormé album) =

Studio album by Mel Tormé
- Released: 19 July 1965
- Recorded: 16, 19 December 1964, and 9 March 1965. Bonus tracks: 10 March 1964, 25 February 1966, 1 & 5 October 1966
- Genre: Vocal jazz
- Length: 68:24 (reissue)
- Label: Columbia

Mel Tormé chronology
Mel Tormé Sings Sunday in New York & Other Songs About New York (1963)	That's All (1965)	Right Now! (1966)

Professional ratings
Review scores
Source	Rating
Allmusic	3/5 stars
The Penguin Guide to Jazz Recordings	3/4 stars
Record Mirror	4/5 stars

That's All is a 1965 studio album by Mel Tormé, arranged by Robert Mersey.

In 1997 it was reissued with 12 bonus tracks.

== Track listing ==
1. "I've Got You Under My Skin" (Cole Porter) – 2:52
2. "That's All" (Alan Brandt, Bob Haymes) – 3:50
3. "What Is There to Say?" (Vernon Duke, Yip Harburg) – 3:11
4. "Do I Love You Because You're Beautiful?" (Oscar Hammerstein II, Richard Rodgers) – 2:50
5. "The Folks Who Live On the Hill" (Hammerstein, Jerome Kern) – 3:35
6. "Isn't It a Pity?" (George Gershwin, Ira Gershwin) – 3:08
7. "Hô-Bá-Lá-Lá" (João Gilberto, Norman Gimbel) – 2:54
8. "P.S. I Love You" (Gordon Jenkins, Johnny Mercer) – 2:47
9. "The Nearness of You" (Hoagy Carmichael, Ned Washington) – 2:51
10. "My Romance" (Lorenz Hart, Rodgers) – 2:46
11. "The Second Time Around" (Sammy Cahn, Jimmy Van Heusen) – 2:51
12. "Haven't We Met?" (Ruth Bachelor, Kenny Rankin) – 2:23
  Bonus tracks included on the 1997 CD release:
13. "I Know Your Heart" (Timothy Gray, Ted Gray, Hugh Martin) – 2:35
14. "You'd Better Love Me" (Timothy Gray, Martin) – 2:23
15. "I See It Now" (William Engvick, Alec Wilder) – 2:58
16. "Once in a Lifetime" (Leslie Bricusse, Anthony Newley) – 2:23
17. "Hang on to Me" (George Gershwin, Ira Gershwin, Peter Matz, Robyn Supraner) – 2:56
18. "Seventeen" (Harry Chapin) – 2:51
19. "I Remember Suzanne" (Stewart, Wolfe) – 2:52
20. "Only the Very Young" (Mel Tormé) – 2:30
21. "Paris Smiles" (Evans, Jarre, Livingston) – 2:53
22. "Ev'ry Day's a Holiday" (Mort Garson, Bob Hilliard) – 2:44
23. "One Little Snowflake" (Tormé) – 2:37
24. "The Christmas Song" (Tormé, Robert Wells) – 3:10

== Personnel ==
- Mel Tormé - vocals
- Robert Mersey - arranger
