= Mel Tormé's California Suite =

Studio album by Mel Tormé
- Released: 1957
- Recorded: 1957
- Genre: Vocal jazz
- Length: 36:41
- Label: Bethlehem

Mel Tormé chronology
Mel Tormé at the Crescendo (1957)	Mel Tormé's California Suite (1957)	Songs for Any Taste (1957)

Professional ratings
Review scores
Source	Rating
Allmusic	4/5 stars

Mel Tormé's California Suite is a 1957 studio album by Mel Tormé, of his California suite.

Tormé first wrote the suite as a twenty-minute piece in 1949, arranged by Neal Hefti and Billy May, with Peggy Lee providing vocals. It was expanded to this LP length version in 1957. The suite was later recorded by Sammy Davis Jr.

== Track listing ==
All music and lyrics written by Mel Tormé, except "San Fernando Valley" by Tormé and Gordon Jenkins.

1. "The Territory (The Soil Was Good)" – 2:57
2. "We Think the West Coast Is the Best" – 1:42
3. "La Jolla" – 3:04
4. "Coney Island" – 2:45
5. "Atlantic City Boardwalk" – 2:33
6. "They Go to San Diego" – 3:53
7. "San Fernando Valley" – 5:04
8. "Got the Date on the Golden Gate" – 4:21
9. "L.A." – 1:48
10. "Six O'Clock (It's Time to Leave the Set)" – 0:55
11. "Nothing to Do (But Shed a Tear)" – 0:22
12. "Poor Little Extra Girl" – 3:52
13. "West Coast Is the Best Coast (Reprise)" – 3:06

== Personnel ==
=== Performance ===
- Mel Tormé - vocals
- Marty Paich - arranger, conductor
- Pete Candoli - trumpet
- Don Fagerquist - trumpet
- Bob Enevoldson - trombone
- Dave Pell - tenor sax
- Barney Kessel - guitar
- Max Bennett - bass
- Mel Lewis - drums
- Alvin Stoller - drums
