= June in January =

"June in January" is a popular song with music by Ralph Rainger and lyrics by Leo Robin, published in 1934.

The song was introduced in the movie Here Is My Heart by Bing Crosby in 1934. The Crosby recording, made on November 9, 1934 with Georgie Stoll and his Orchestra, became a number #1 hit on Decca Records and has since become a popular standard, recorded by many artists. Crosby recorded the song again for his 1954 album Bing: A Musical Autobiography and this version was heard alongside an image of a Crosby lookalike in the film The Joker Is Wild (1957), starring Frank Sinatra. Crosby recorded it again in 1977 for his final album Seasons.

== Other notable recordings ==
- Little Jack Little – his version reached the No. 7 spot in the USA charts in 1934
- Ted Fio Rito – his recording also charted in 1934, achieving the No. 10 position.
- Guy Lombardo had a successful version in 1935 and this hit #14 in the charts of the day.
- Roy Fox and his Orchestra – vocal by Denny Dennis (1934)
- The Hi-Lo's – Listen! (1954)
- Jo Stafford – Ski Trails (1956)
- Julie London – Calendar Girl (1956)
- Les Paul and Mary Ford – Time to Dream (1957)
- Eydie Gormé – Love Is a Season (1958)
- Teddi King – All the King's Songs (1959)
- Dean Martin – A Winter Romance (1959)
- Ferrante & Teicher – Snowbound (1962)
- Wes Montgomery - Groove Brothers (1979, reed. 1998) song recorded in 1960 or 1961
