= Carson Parks =

American singer-songwriter (1936–2005)

C. Carson Parks
- Born: Clarence Carson Parks II; April 26, 1936; Philadelphia, U.S.
- Died: June 22, 2005 (aged 69)
- Occupations: Singer, songwriter
- Instruments: Vocals, guitar, etc.
- Years active: 1959 – c.1969
- Website: http://www.ccarsonparks.com

Clarence Carson Parks II (April 26, 1936 – June 22, 2005) was an American songwriter, music publisher, musician and singer, best known for writing the hit song "Somethin' Stupid". His younger brother is the composer Van Dyke Parks.

== Early life and career ==
Parks was born in Philadelphia, the son of a psychiatrist. Carson's early musical training began as a student at the internationally acclaimed American Boychoir School (formerly known as The Columbus Boychoir School). After attending Phillips Academy in Andover, Massachusetts, the University of Miami and then Carnegie Mellon University, he began working in Los Angeles. In 1959, with college friend Bernie Armstrong, he formed the Steeltown Two and first recorded for the small Gini label. The duo also worked as one half of a reformed version of Terry Gilkyson's band, The Easy Riders, and in 1960 they performed on the soundtrack of the John Wayne film The Alamo. The pair also worked as The Kinsmen with singer Bud Dashiell, before Parks left in 1962. He then formed a new version of the Steeltown Two, with his younger brother, Van Dyke Parks, occasionally adding singer Pat Peyton as the Steeltown Three and the Southcoasters.

Following the success of The New Christy Minstrels, Gilkyson and the Parks brothers formed a choral group, the Greenwood County Singers, featuring five men and two women. They released four albums on Kapp Records between 1963 and 1965, later becoming known as The Greenwood Singers and finally The Greenwoods. The group had two minor hits, "Please Don't Sell My Daddy No More Wine" reaching number #64 on the Billboard Hot 100 in 1966, and included singer Gaile Foote, whom Carson Parks married.

== "Somethin' Stupid" ==
Before the Greenwoods disbanded, Parks and Foote also began performing as a duo, Carson and Gaile, and in 1966 recorded an album for Kapp Records, San Antonio Rose. This mostly included Parks' own songs, one of which was the track "Somethin' Stupid". Through a contact in Frank Sinatra's organisation, Parks ensured that Sinatra heard the song. Sinatra played it to his daughter Nancy's producer, Lee Hazlewood, who recalled "He asked me, 'Do you like it?' and I said, 'I love it, and if you don't sing it with Nancy, I will.' He said, 'We're gonna do it, book a studio.'" The recording by Frank and Nancy Sinatra spent four weeks at number one on the US Billboard Hot 100 chart and also reached number one on the UK Singles Chart.

== Later career ==
Following the success of "Somethin' Stupid", Parks wrote songs for other artists, including The Mills Brothers and Jack Jones. The Mills Brothers recording of Parks' "Cab Driver" reached number 23 on the Billboard Hot 100 and number 3 on the Billboard Easy listening chart in 1968. He receded from performing and writing to focus on publishing, owning and operating the Waynesville, North Carolina–based music publishing firms Greenwood Music and Br'er Rab Music. He died in 2005 in St. Marys, Georgia, at the age of 69.

== Discography ==
=== The Steeltown Two ===
45 1959 The Wolves / Tarrytown (Gini Records)
45 1959 The Potters Wheel / The Straw Carol (Neophon Records)

=== The Easy Riders ===
LP 1960 Rollin' (Kapp Records)
LP 1961 Remember the Alamo (Kapp Records)
LP 1963 The Cry of the Wild Goose (Kapp Records)
45 1961? Deep Blue Sea / Nite Life (Montclare Records)

=== Bud Dashiell and the Kinsmen ===
LP 1961 Bud Dashiell and the Kinsmen (Warner Bros. Records)

=== The Steeltown Three ===
45 1962? Rock Mountain / The Girl with the Sad Eyes (Montclare Records)

=== The Southcoasters ===
45 1962? San Francisco Bay / Long Gone from the Farm (Montclare Records)

=== The Greenwood County Singers ===
LP 1964 The First Recording by the Joyful... (Kapp Records)
45 1964 Frankie and Johnny (aka The New Frankie and Johnnie Song) / Climb Up Sunshine Mountain (Kapp No. 591) (Billboard number 75 pop)
LP 1964 Have You Heard... (Kapp Records)
LP 1965 The Ballad of Cat Ballou (Kapp Records)
45 1965 Anne / Cake Walking Babies from Home (Kapp Records)

=== The Greenwoods ===
45 1966 Please Don't Sell My Daddy No More Wine / Southbound (Kapp No. 742) (Billboard number 64 pop)

=== Carson and Gaile ===
LP 1966 San Antonio Rose (Kapp Records)
45 1966 The Wild Side of Life / How Much Is That Doggie... (Congress Records)
45 1967 Something Stupid / Chapter One (Kapp Records)
