= Mel Tormé Live at the Playboy Jazz Festival =

Live album by Mel Tormé
- Released: September 10, 2002
- Recorded: June 1993
- Genre: Vocal jazz
- Length: 55:07
- Label: Playboy Jazz

Mel Tormé chronology
An Evening with Mel Tormé (1996)	Mel Tormé Live at the Playboy Jazz Festival (2002)

Professional ratings
Review scores
Source	Rating
Allmusic	3/5 stars

Mel Tormé Live at the Playboy Jazz Festival is a 2002 live album by Mel Tormé, recorded at the Hollywood Bowl at the 1993 Playboy Jazz Festival.

== Track listing ==
1. "Opus No. 1" (Benny Goodman, Lionel Hampton, Sy Oliver) – 2:17
2. "I Had the Craziest Dream"/"Darn That Dream" (Mack Gordon, Harry Warren)/(Van Heusen, Eddie DeLange) – 4:52
3. "I'm Gonna Go Fishin'" (Duke Ellington, Peggy Lee) – 3:06
4. Medley: "Sophisticated Lady"/"I Didn't Know About You" (Ellington, Irving Mills, Mitchell Parish)/(Ellington, Bob Russell) – 5:25
5. "It Don't Mean a Thing (If It Ain't Got That Swing)" (Ellington, Mills) – 5:29
6. Medley: "Stompin' at the Savoy"/"Don't Be That Way"/"And the Angels Sing" (Andy Razaf, Edgar Sampson)/(Goodman, Sampson, Parish)/(Ziggy Elman, Johnny Mercer) – 14:38

== Personnel ==
Performance

- Mel Tormé - vocals

Ray Anthony Orchestra

- Ray Anthony - trumpet
- Kevin Anthony - saxophone
- Lee Callet
- Bob Efford
- Salvadore Lozano
- Roger Neumann
- Andy Martin - trombone
- Morris Repass
- Bill Tole
- Lloyd Ulyate
- Wayne Bergeron - trumpet
- Ramon Flores
- George Graham
- Frank Szabo
- John Colianni - piano
- Tom Ranier
- John Leitham - double bass
- Kirk Smith
- Frank Capp - drums
- Donny Osbourne

Production

- Glen Barros - executive producer
- John Burk - producer, executive producer
- George Wein - producer
- Valerie Whitesell - production coordination
- Hugh Hefner - liner notes, executive producer
- A. James Liska - liner notes
- Seth Presant - mastering, assembly
