= A Vintage Year =

Live album by Mel Tormé
- Released: 1988
- Recorded: August 1987
- Venue: Paul Masson Winery, Saratoga, CA
- Genre: Jazz
- Length: 54:31
- Label: Concord
- Producer: Carl Jefferson

Mel Tormé chronology
Mel Tormé, Rob McConnell and the Boss Brass (1986)	A Vintage Year (1988)	Mel Tormé and the Marty Paich Dektette – Reunion (1990)

A Vintage Year is a 1987 live album by the American jazz singer Mel Tormé, accompanied by George Shearing.

Professional ratings
Review scores
Source	Rating
Allmusic	4.5/5 stars
The Penguin Guide to Jazz Recordings	3/4 stars

== Track listing ==
1. "Whisper Not"/"Love Me or Leave Me" (Benny Golson, Leonard Feather), (Walter Donaldson, Gus Kahn) – 4:17
2. "Out of This World" (Harold Arlen, Johnny Mercer) – 5:11
3. "Someday I'll Find You" (Noël Coward) – 2:52
4. "Midnight Sun" (Sonny Burke, Lionel Hampton, Mercer) – 5:36
5. New York, New York Medley: "For Me and My Gal"/"Mack the Knife"/"The Birth of the Blues"/"Send a Little Love My Way"/"How High the Moon"/"Theme from New York, New York" (Ray Goetz, Edgar Leslie, George Meyer)/(Bertolt Brecht, Marc Blitzstein, Kurt Weill)/(Lew Brown, Buddy DeSylva, Lew Henderson)/(Henry Mancini)/(Nancy Hamilton, Morgan Lewis)/(Fred Ebb, John Kander) – 6:01
6. "The Folks Who Live On the Hill" (Oscar Hammerstein II, Jerome Kern) – 5:08
7. "Bittersweet" (Sam Jones) – 5:47
8. "Since I Fell for You" (Buddy Johnson) – 4:40
9. "The Way You Look Tonight" (Dorothy Fields, Kern) – 3:37
10. "Anyone Can Whistle"/"A Tune for Humming" (Stephen Sondheim)/(Sondheim) – 5:53
11. "When Sunny Gets Blue" (Marvin Fisher, Jack Segal) – 3:29
12. "Little Man, You've Had a Busy Day" (Al Hoffman, Maurice Sigler, Mabel Wayne) – 5:55

== Personnel ==
- Mel Tormé – vocals
- George Shearing – piano
- Jennifer (John) Leitham – double bass
- Donny Osborne – drums
