= Velvet & Brass =

Studio album by Mel Tormé
- Released: 1995
- Recorded: May 5–6, 1995
- Genre: Vocal jazz
- Length: 55:07
- Label: Concord
- Producer: John Burk

Mel Tormé chronology
A Tribute to Bing Crosby (1994)	Velvet & Brass (1995)	An Evening with Mel Tormé (1996)

Professional ratings
Review scores
Source	Rating
AllMusic	4/5 stars
The Penguin Guide to Jazz Recordings	3/4 stars

Velvet & Brass is a 1995 album by Mel Tormé, with Rob McConnell's Boss Brass big band. This was Tormé's second recording with the band; his first was released in 1987. Velvet & Brass was Tormé's final studio album.

== Track listing ==
1. "Nobody Else but Me" (Oscar Hammerstein II, Jerome Kern) – 3:59
2. "Liza (All the Clouds'll Roll Away)" (George Gershwin, Ira Gershwin, Gus Kahn) – 3:33
3. "If You Could See Me Now" (Tadd Dameron, Carl Sigman) – 4:50
4. "I Get a Kick Out of You" (Cole Porter) – 5:14
5. "Have You Met Miss Jones?" (Lorenz Hart, Richard Rodgers) – 2:48
6. "Love Walked In" (G. Gershwin, I. Gershwin) – 3:34
7. "Autumn Serenade" (Peter DeRose, Sammy Gallop) – 5:58
8. "My Sweetie Went Away" (Lou Handman, Roy Turk) – 3:28
9. "I'll Be Around" (Alec Wilder) – 4:23
10. "On the Swing Shift" (Harold Arlen, Johnny Mercer) – 3:18
11. "High and Low" (Desmond Carter, Howard Dietz, Arthur Schwartz) – 3:11
12. "In the Still of the Night" (Cole Porter) – 5:02
13. "I'm Glad There Is You" (Jimmy Dorsey, Paul Madeira, Paul Mertz) – 4:36

== Personnel ==
- Mel Tormé – vocals
- Rob McConnell's Boss Brass big band
