= Mel Tormé live at the Maisonette =

Live album by Mel Tormé
- Released: 1975
- Recorded: September 1974
- Venue: St. Regis Hotel, New York City, New York
- Genre: Vocal jazz
- Length: 39:08
- Label: Atlantic
- Producer: Michael Cox

Mel Tormé chronology
| Raindrops Keep Fallin' on My Head (1969) | Mel Tormé live at the Maisonette (1975) | Tormé: A New Album (1977) |

Professional ratings
Review scores
| Source | Rating |
|---|---|
| Allmusic | 3/5 stars |
| The Penguin Guide to Jazz Recordings | 2.5/4 stars |

Mel Tormé live at the Maisonette is a 1975 live album by Mel Tormé.

Tormé had not released an album since 1969, and would not make any studio recordings until 1977, with the launch of Tormé: A New Album.

This live album was recorded privately, and sold to Atlantic Records; Tormé subsequently claimed never to have received any money from this recording. For the Gershwin medley, Tormé was nominated for the Grammy Award for Best Arrangement Accompanying Vocalist(s) at the Grammy Awards of 1976.

== Track listing ==
1. Introduction – 1:06
2. "Jet Set" (Mel Tormé) – 3:18
3. "What Are You Doing the Rest of Your Life?" (Alan Bergman, Marilyn Bergman, Michel Legrand) – 3:44
4. "Mountain Greenery" (Richard Rodgers, Lorenz Hart) – 3:16
5. "It Takes Too Long to Learn to Live Alone" (Leon Carr) – 4:37
6. "Route 66" (Bobby Troup) – 4:24
7. Gershwin medley: "I Got Rhythm"/"Mine"/"Do-Do-Do"/"'S Wonderful"/"Embraceable You"/"Love Walked In"/"Love Is Here to Stay"/"Oh, Lady be Good!"/"A Foggy Day"/"How Long Has This Been Going On?"/"Oh Bess, Oh Where's My Bess?"/"Who Cares?"/"Love is Sweeping the Country"/"Of Thee I Sing"/"Swanee"/"Strike Up the Band"/"I'll Build a Stairway to Paradise" – 15:39
8. "Superstition" (Stevie Wonder) – 3:22
9. "The Party's Over" (Adolph Green, Betty Comden, Jule Styne) – 1:42

All compositions on track seven by George Gershwin, with lyrics by Ira Gershwin, except "Swanee", lyrics by Irving Caesar, and "I'll Build a Stairway to Paradise", lyrics by Ira Gershwin and Buddy DeSylva.

== Personnel ==
=== Performance ===
- Mel Tormé - vocals, arranger
- Al Porcino and his Orchestra
