= Scooter Lee =

American singer-songwriter

- Born: Scooter Lee; March 10, 1957 (age 69); New Orleans, Louisiana, U.S.
- Genres: Country; country pop; gospel
- Occupations: Singer-songwriter; record producer; philanthropist
- Years active: 1971–present
- Labels: Universal; Sony Music; Lowery Music; Scootway; Superline
- Website: www.scooterlee.com

Scooter Lee (born March 10, 1957) is an American singer-songwriter & line dance entertainer. Raised on St. Charles Avenue in New Orleans, Louisiana, her career started at age 14 when she was signed to Allen Toussaint's record label in New Orleans, recording with Irma Thomas, Jerry Lee Lewis and Fats Domino. There, she was labeled as 'the little lady with the big voice'; recording country blues for the label. She soon settled in on recording country music with a blues overtone.

During the 1970s, Scooter Lee toured alongside major artists, including Linda Ronstadt, Kris Kristofferson, Tammy Wynette and Johnny & June Carter Cash. In the 1980s, Scooter Lee gained ground with her 5-piece band sponsored by the RJ Reynolds Tobacco Company, working 10 months a year at every major state fair and other regional festivals. Performing 2-3 shows daily, 300 dates a year, taught her the art of fully commanding a stage. Spotted in Los Angeles in 1985, Scooter Lee was invited to join the Bob Hope USO Tours and gained experience on stages in war-torn countries.

Scooter Lee grabbed the attention of the country music dance community during the early 1990s when she was signed to Sony Records to follow in the footsteps of Billy Ray Cyrus, Brooks & Dunn, Tracy Byrd and Reba McEntire just as the 'line dance' phenomenon emerged. She developed and perfected the formula of writing & recording a perfectly phrased song that was not only 'dancer friendly' but 'radio friendly' as well. Some of her most successful singles include J'ai du Boogie, Dizzy, Rose Garden, High-Test Love, Ribbon Of Highway, Roll Back The Rug, Honky Tonk Twist, OeeOeeO, Rock & Roll Waltz, Rompin' Stompin', Louisiana Hot Sauce, This Little Light Of Mine, Splish Splash and Break Away.

As of 2006, Lee tours for 200 days a year worldwide across 27 countries.

Currently, Scooter Lee resides in Atlanta, Georgia where she owns and operates her international distribution company for audio and video as well as founding a senior health 501(c)(3) charity organization that uses line dance as its chosen form of exercise. The nonprofit charity, Dancing For The Dream, Inc., promotes healthy lifestyles for seniors throughout the United States & abroad and encourages "Dancing For The Health Of It".

== Discography ==
- Honky Tonk Twist (1994)
- Scooter Lee's New Album (1995)
- High-Test Love (1997)
- In the Name of Love (1997)
- Moving On Up (1998)
- By Request… The Disco/Dance Album (1999)
- Would You Consider (2000)
- The Best of Scooter Lee (2000)
- Dancing in the Streets (2001)
- Steppin' Out (2001)
- Set the Northpole on Fire (2002)
- More of the Best (2002)
- Puttin' on the Ritz (2003)
- Walking on Sunshine (2004)
- Test of Time (2005)
- Go to the Rock (2007)
- Home to Louisiana (2008)
- Sing a New Song, Dance a New Dance (2011)
- Big Bang Boogie (2011)
- Welcome to Scooterville (2013)
- I'm Gonna Love You Forever (2014)
