= Happy Holiday (Jo Stafford album) =

Studio album by Jo Stafford
- Released: October 1955
- Genre: Traditional pop, jazz, Christmas
- Label: Columbia

Jo Stafford chronology
| A Musical Portrait of New Orleans (1955) | Happy Holiday (1955) | Memory Songs (1955) |

Professional ratings
Review scores
| Source | Rating |
|---|---|
| Allmusic | 3/5 stars |

Happy Holiday is a 1955 Christmas album of Christmas songs and carols by Jo Stafford, accompanied by her husband Paul Weston and his orchestra. The entire family participated in the creation of this album; young Tim Weston is the small boy on the cover. Stafford is also joined by The Starlighters for vocal background, just as she was after her version of The Chesterfield Supper Club moved to Hollywood.

All of the tracks from the album, along with those from Stafford's 1956 Ski Trails album, are included on the 1999 compilation Happy Holidays: I Love the Winter Weather, released on Stafford and Weston's Corinthian Records label.

== Track listing ==
1. "Happy Holiday"
2. "Winter Weather"
3. "The Christmas Song"
4. "Let It Snow! Let It Snow! Let It Snow!"
5. "Toyland"
6. "March of the Toys"
7. "Winter Wonderland"
8. "'Twas the Night Before Christmas"
9. "I Wonder as I Wander"
10. "O Little Town of Bethlehem"
11. "Silent Night"
12. "Happy Holiday" (reprise)
