= An Evening at Charlie's =

Live album by Mel Tormé
- Released: 1983
- Recorded: October 1983 in Los Angeles, U.S.
- Genre: Vocal jazz, Jazz
- Length: 39:14
- Label: Concord
- Producer: Carl Jefferson

Mel Tormé chronology
Top Drawer (1983)	An Evening at Charlie's (1983)	An Elegant Evening (1985)

An Evening at Charlie's is a 1983 live album by the American jazz singer Mel Tormé, accompanied by George Shearing.

Professional ratings
Review scores
Source	Rating
Allmusic	4.5/5 stars
The Penguin Guide to Jazz Recordings	3/4 stars

== Track listing ==
1. "Just One of Those Things"/"On Green Dolphin Street" (Cole Porter), (Bronislaw Kaper, Ned Washington) 6:42
2. "Dream Dancing" (Porter) 3:11
3. "Dream Dancing" 3:36
4. "I'm Hip" (Bob Dorough, Dave Frishberg) 3:33
5. "Then I'll Be Tired of You" (Arthur Schwartz) 4:41
6. "Caught in the Middle of My Years"/"Welcome to the Club" (Mel Tormé, George Shearing) 6:02
7. "Nica's Dream" (Horace Silver) 6:32
8. "Chase Me Charlie" (Noël Coward) 4:04
9. "Love Is Just Around the Corner" (Lewis Gensler, Leo Robin) 2:48

== Personnel ==
- Mel Tormé – vocals
- George Shearing – piano
- Don Thompson – double bass
- Donny Osbourne – drums
