= Mel Tormé, Rob McConnell and the Boss Brass =

Studio album by Mel Tormé
- Released: 1986
- Recorded: May 1986
- Genre: Vocal jazz
- Length: 43:22
- Label: Concord
- Producer: Carl Jefferson

Mel Tormé chronology
An Elegant Evening (1985)	Mel Tormé, Rob McConnell and the Boss Brass (1986)	A Vintage Year (1987)

Professional ratings
Review scores
Source	Rating
Allmusic	5/5 stars
The Penguin Guide to Jazz Recordings	2.5/4 stars

Mel Tormé, Rob McConnell and the Boss Brass is a 1986 studio album by Mel Tormé, accompanied by Rob McConnell's Boss Brass Big band. Tormé and McConnell's follow up album, Velvet & Brass was released in 1995.

== Track listing ==
1. "Just Friends" (John Klenner, Sam M. Lewis) - 4:46
2. "September Song" (Maxwell Anderson, Kurt Weill) - 4:55
3. "Don'cha Go 'Way Mad" (Illinois Jacquet, Jimmy Mundy, Al Stillman) - 4:30
4. "A House Is Not a Home" (Burt Bacharach, Hal David) - 3:37
5. "The Song Is You" (Oscar Hammerstein II, Jerome Kern) - 3:45
6. "Cow Cow Boogie" (Benny Carter, Gene DePaul, Don Raye) - 4:00
7. "Handful of Stars"/"Stars Fell on Alabama (Jack Lawrence, Ted Shapiro)/(Frank Perkins, Mitchell Parish) - 5:34
8. Duke Ellington Medley: "It Don't Mean a Thing (If It Ain't Got That Swing)"/"Do Nothing Till You Hear from Me"/"Mood Indigo"/"Take the "A" Train"/"Sophisticated Lady"/"Satin Doll" (Duke Ellington, Irving Mills)/(Ellington, Bob Russell)/(Barney Bigard, (Ellington, Mills)/(Ellington, Mills, Mitchell Parish)/(Strayhorn, Ellington, Johnny Mercer) - 12:15

== Personnel ==
Recorded May 1986, in Los Angeles, U.S.:

- Mel Tormé - vocals

The Boss Brass

- Arnie Chycoski - trumpet, flugelhorn
- Erich Traugott
- John MacLeod
- Ian McDougall - trombone
- Dave McMurdo
- Bob Livingston
- Ron Hughes - bass trombone
- James MacDonald - french horn
- Eugene Amaro - flute, tenor saxophone
- Moe Koffman - clarinet, flute, alto saxophone, soprano saxophone
- Bob Leonard - flute, bass clarinet, baritone saxophone
- Rick Wilkins - clarinet, tenor saxophone
- Dave Woods - trumpet, violin, flugelhorn
- Robert Leonard - flute, bass clarinet, baritone saxophone
- George Stimpson
- Jerry Toth - flute, alto clarinet
- Jimmy Dale - piano, electric piano
- Guido Basso - harmonica, trumpet, flugelhorn
- Ed Bickert - guitar
- Jerry Fuller - drums
- Brian Leonard - percussion
- Steve Wallace - double bass
- Rob McConnell - arranger, conductor, trombone
