= Jack Strachey =

British composer and songwriter (1894–1972)

- Strachey (right) with Eric Maschwitz (left)
- Born: John Francis Strache; 25 September 1894; London, England, UKGBI
- Died: 27 May 1972 (aged 77); Brighton, England, UK
- Occupations: composer; songwriter

Jack Francis Strachey (25 September 1894 – 27 May 1972) was a British composer and songwriter.

Strachey was born John Francis Strachey in London on 25 September 1894, he began writing songs in the 1920s for the theatre and the music hall, scoring his first success with songs he had written for Frith Shephard's long-running musical revue Lady Luck which opened at The Carlton Theatre in April 1927 where it ran for 324 performances.

In the 1930s, he began to collaborate with Eric Maschwitz and in 1936 Strachey, Maschwitz (using the pen name Holt Marvell), and Harry Link co-wrote "These Foolish Things (Remind Me of You)", which was to provide a top ten hit for five separate artists in 1936. Benny Goodman was among the five artists to record the song in 1936, and it has been widely covered since – by Billie Holiday, Thelonious Monk and Bryan Ferry among others. Under the title "Ces Petites Choses", it was also a hit in France for Dorothy Dickson.

In the 1940s, Strachey began to compose light orchestral pieces for the Bosworth Music Library, and is best remembered in Britain as the composer of "Theatreland", "Pink Champagne", and especially "In Party Mood", which was first issued on Bosworth BC1172 in 1944. It became the signature tune of Housewives' Choice, a popular radio show on the BBC Light Programme which ran until 1967.

Jack Strachey moved to Brighton in 1958 and died there on 27 May 1972.
