= Prelude to a Kiss (album) =

Studio album by Mel Tormé
- Released: 1958
- Recorded: November 1957
- Genre: Vocal jazz
- Length: 33:15
- Label: Tops Records

Mel Tormé chronology
Tormé Meets the British (1957)	Prelude to a Kiss (1958)	Mel Tormé Sings About Love (1958)

Professional ratings
Review scores
Source	Rating
Allmusic	3/5 stars
The Penguin Guide to Jazz Recordings	3/4 stars

Prelude to a Kiss is a 1958 concept album by Mel Tormé. The album charts the course of a relationship, where each track is interspersed with dialogue. The album was recorded in Los Angeles in November, 1957.

== Track listing ==
1. "Something to Live For" (Duke Ellington, Billy Strayhorn)
2. "I'm Getting Sentimental Over You" (George Bassman, Ned Washington)
3. "I Don't Stand a Ghost of a Chance With You" (Bing Crosby, Washington, Victor Young)
4. "I Can't Believe That You're In Love With Me" (Clarence Gaskill, Jimmy McHugh)
5. "Prelude to a Kiss" (Ellington, Mack Gordon, Irving Mills)
6. "I've Got the World on a String" (Harold Arlen, Ted Koehler)
7. "Between the Devil and the Deep Blue Sea" (Arlen, Koehler)
8. "I Surrender Dear" (Harry Barris, Gordon Clifford)
9. "I Let a Song Go Out of My Heart" (Ellington, Mills, Nemo)
10. "Don't Worry 'bout Me" (Rube Bloom, Koehler)
11. "One Morning in May" (Hoagy Carmichael, Mitchell Parish)
12. "I Can't Give You Anything But Love" (Dorothy Fields, McHugh)

== Personnel ==
- Mel Torme - Vocals
- Marty Paich - Arranger, Conductor, Piano, Celesta
- Don Fagerquist - Trumpet
- Ronnie Lang - Alto-saxophone, Baritone-saxophone, Clarinet
- Hynie Gunkler - Alto-saxophone and Clarinet
- Bob Enevoldsen - Tenor-saxophone and Bass-clarinet
- Vince DeRosa - French horn
- Bill Pitman - Guitar
- Joe Mondragon - Bass
- Mel Lewis - Drums
- Stella Castellucci - Harp
