= The Mom and Dads =

American folk music group

The Mom and Dads were a Western-styled folk music group from Spokane, Washington that specialized in waltzes, polkas, and general easy listening. The quartet, made up of one woman and three men, featured Doris A. Crow (June 17, 1905 – September 28, 1998) on piano, Quentin Ratliff (August 13, 1933 – January 25, 2013) on saxophone, Leslie Welch (February 2, 1912 – February 1, 1983) on accordion, and Harold Hendren (July 12, 1919 – September 9, 2008) on drums.

== Band biography ==
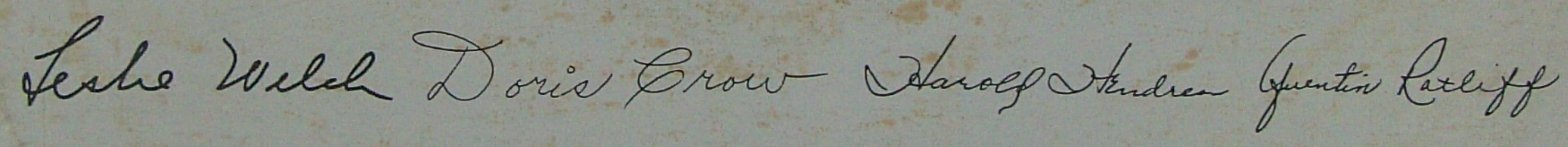
Signatures L-R: Leslie Welch, Doris Crow, Harold Hendren, Quentin Ratliff. From the back cover of the album "The Mom and Dads Play Your Favorite Hymns", 1974

The band, which formed in the early 1960s, named itself after its main repertoire; "Music for Mom and Dad". . In the early years of its history, the band was strictly a part-time endeavor with its members holding down more typical jobs during the week.

Their LP album entitled Presenting... The Mom and Dads had a mini biography printed on the back of the album sleeve. The section claimed that the Mom and Dads were able to play nearly any type of then existing dance music, from turn of the century dance music such as the Three Step, to more modern sounds, such as country and western.

Their biography states that all the band members had individually begun to play dance music between the ages of 12 and 14. Doris Crow and Leslie Welch had been playing together for over 22 years when the youngest member of the band, Quentin Ratliff joined them. The group finally became a four-piece 7 years later when Harold Hendren, who had begun his musical career in New Mexico, joined the band on drums.

Most of the band's fame was in Canada and Australia. They first gained notoriety when a disc jockey from a high-powered radio station in Great Falls, Montana played their early recording, "The Rangers Waltz", a song composed by Quentin Ratliff, the group's saxophonist, also carrying into the Canadian province of Alberta. "The Rangers Waltz" was also released as a single in Australia, where it reached #2 on the national charts, and in New Zealand, where it reached #1 for one week in March '72.

"The Ranger's Waltz" marked their peak in 1971, when the title cut off the same-named album climbed into the American Top 10 country music charts, topping out at Number Four and eventually achieving double-platinum sales figures. The band had first started to appear on music charts earlier that year with the album "In the Blue Canadian Rockies".

The Mom and Dads also began their first international tour, albeit reluctantly, when they went to Australia in the fall of 1974, after another act had cancelled. They spent four weeks promoting their albums overseas before returning home and resuming performance dates in their native Pacific Northwest.

The group continued to tour and record regularly, until Welch's death in 1983. The last album recorded before his death was Goodnight Sweetheart. The band put out a final album, Thanks for the Memories, in 1986 before disbanding.

== Discography ==
=== Albums ===
Year	Album	Chart Positions				CRIA
Year	Album	US Country	US	AUS	CAN	CRIA
1970	Presenting the Mom and Dads	—	—	—	57	—
1971	In the Blue Canadian Rockies	18	165	—	74	Platinum
1971	The Rangers Waltz	4	85	7	—	2× Platinum
1972	Reminiscing with the Mom and Dads	—	—	—	—	Gold
1972	Souvenirs	—	—	—	—	Gold
1972	Merry Christmas with the Mom and Dads	—	—	—	—	—
1973	The Mom and Dads Again	—	—	—	—	Gold
1973	Dance with the Mom and Dads	30	—	—	—	—
1976	Memories	—	—	—	—	—
1977	The Best of the Mom and Dads	—	—	—	—	Platinum
1978	Golden Country	—	—	—	—	—
1980	20 Favorite Waltzes	—	—	—	—	Gold

=== Singles ===
Year	Single	Chart Positions			Certification	Album
Year	Single	US	CAN Country	AUS	Certification	Album
1971	"Rippling River Waltz"	—	38	—		Souvenirs
1971	"The Rangers Waltz"	101	—	2	AUS: 135,000	The Rangers Waltz
1972	"In The Blue Canadian Rockies"	—	—	54		In the Blue Canadian Rockies

== Releases ==
=== Singles ===
- "The Ranger's Waltz" GNP
- "Amazing Grace" GNP-Crescendo
- "Anniversary Waltz" GNP-Crescendo
- "Auld Lang Syne" GNP
- "Baby Blue" GNP-Crescendo
- "Blue Canadian Rockies" Golden West Melodies
- "Blue Skirt Waltz" MCA
- "Cab Driver Foxtrot"
- "Jingle Bell Rock" (1972) MCA
- "Kentucky Waltz" GNP Crescendo
- "Love Is a Beautiful Song" MCA
- "Mom&Dad's Schottische"
- "Moonlight On The Manitoulin" MCA
- "My Blue Heaven" GNP-Crescendo
- "My Happiness" (1973) GNP-Crescendo
- "Quentin's E Flat Boogie" GNP Crescendo
- "Ragtime Annie P"
- "Rippling River Waltz" (1971) MCA
- "Silver Moon"
- "Skirts"
- "Somewhere My Love"
- "St Paul Waltz"
- "Wabash Cannonball"
- "Waltz Across Texas"
- "Waltz you Saved For Me"/"When The Saints Go Marching In"
- "Whispering"
- "White Silver Sands"
- "Your Cheatin' Heart"

=== Albums ===
- Presenting The Mom and Dads (1971) Apex
- Blue Canadian Rockies (1971) MCA
- Souvenirs (1972) MCA
- The Mom and Dads Again (1972) MCA
- Merry Christmas (1973) MCA
- Reminiscing with The Mom and Dads (1973) MCA
- Love Is a Beautiful Song (1974) MCA
- Dance with The Mom and Dads (1974) MCA
- (The Mom and Dads) Play Your Favorite Hymns (1974) GRT
- In The Good Old Summertime (1976)
- Down The River Of Golden Dreams (1976)
- Meet The Mom and Dads (1977) GRT
- Best Of (1977) GRT
- One Dozen Roses (1977) GNP-Crescendo
- Whispering Hope (1977) GRT
- 22 Favorite Country Songs (1977) GNP-Crescendo
- Gratefully Yours (1978) Interfusion
- 20 Favorite Waltzes (1978) GRT
- To Mom and Dad With Love (1980) MCA
- With Love From The Mom and Dads (1980) Crescendo
- Good Night Sweetheart (1982) Crescendo
- Thanks For The Memories (1986) Quality
- Dream With The Mom and Dads GRT
- Love Letters In The Sand Crescendo
- Memories (1976) Crescendo
- Blue Hawaii MCA
- The Very Best Of MCA
- 18 Cand W Favorites
- Collection (5 LP set)
- Rangers Waltz
