= Comin' Home Baby! =

Studio album by Mel Tormé
- Released: 1962
- Recorded: July 11–September 13, 1962
- Genre: Jazz
- Length: 33:12
- Label: Atlantic
- Producer: Nesuhi Ertegun

Mel Tormé chronology
My Kind of Music (1962)	Comin' Home Baby! (1962)	Mel Tormé at the Red Hill (1963)

Professional ratings
Review scores
Source	Rating
Allmusic	2.5/5 stars
The Penguin Guide to Jazz Recordings	3/4 stars

Comin' Home Baby! is a 1962 studio album by Mel Tormé.

== Track listing ==
1. "Comin' Home Baby!" (Bob Dorough, Ben Tucker) – 2:41
2. "Dat Dere" (Oscar Brown, Jr., Bobby Timmons) – 2:58
3. "The Lady's in Love with You" (Burton Lane, Frank Loesser) – 3:01
4. "Hi-Fly" (Jon Hendricks, Randy Weston) – 3:13
5. "Puttin' on the Ritz" (Irving Berlin) – 2:23
6. "Walkin'" (Richard Carpenter) – 2:59
7. "Moanin'" (Hendricks, Timmons) – 3:03
8. "Sing You Sinners" (Sam Coslow, W. Franke Harling) – 2:27
9. "Whisper Not" (Leonard Feather, Benny Golson) – 2:49
10. "On Green Dolphin Street" (Bronislaw Kaper, Ned Washington) – 2:56
11. "Sidney's Soliloquy" (Jimmy Wisner) – 2:30
12. "Right Now" (Herbie Mann, Carl Sigman) – 2:12

== Personnel ==
Recorded July 11 – September 13, 1962, in Los Angeles:

- Mel Tormé – vocals, drums
- Shorty Rogers – arranger and conductor
- Claus Ogerman – arranger and conductor on "Comin' Home Baby!" and "Right Now"
- Joe Burnett – trumpet
- Ollie Mitchell – trumpet
- Al Porcino – trumpet
- Ray Triscari – trumpet
- Milt Bernhart – trombone
- Harry Betts – trombone
- Kenny Shroyer – trombone
- John Kitzmiller – tuba
- Bud Shank – woodwind
- Buddy Collette – woodwind
- Bob Cooper – woodwind
- Bill Hood – woodwind
- Gene Estes – vibraphone
- Mike Wofford – piano
- Joe Mondragon – bass guitar
- Larry Bunker – drums
- The Cookies – backing vocals
- Nesuhi Ertegun – producer ("supervised by")
- Bones Howe and Tom Dowd – recording engineers
- Nat Hentoff – liner notes
