= Right Now! (Mel Tormé album) =

Studio album by Mel Tormé
- Released: 15 August 1966
- Recorded: 18 April & 10–11 June 1966
- Genre: Vocal jazz
- Length: 68:24
- Label: Columbia

Mel Tormé chronology
That's All (1965)	Right Now! (1966)	A Day in the Life of Bonnie and Clyde (1968)

Professional ratings
Review scores
Source	Rating
The Penguin Guide to Jazz Recordings	2.5/4 stars

Right Now! is a 1966 studio album by Mel Tormé. Columbia followed up Tormé's 1965 album of standards with "an obvious bid to sell records by putting Tormé's voice on pre-sold hits of the mid-'60s." "The Velvet Fog's" descent on contemporary middle-of-the-road top-40 melodies from Paul Simon and the Bacharach-David catalogue leads some to emphasize the commercialism of the project and file this period of Tormé's career in the lounge music section of records stores, as evidenced by his appearances on compilations like the Ultra Lounge series. However, music critic Will Friedwald makes a strong case that the work of Tormé and arranger Mort Garson elevated the project above "an album of straight "covers"."

In 1997, Right Now! was reissued on CD with previously unreleased bonus tracks and liner notes.

== Track listing ==
1. "Comin' Home Baby" (Bob Dorough, Ben Tucker) – 3:21
2. "Homeward Bound" (Paul Simon) – 2:33
3. "My Little Red Book" (Burt Bacharach, Hal David) – 2:40
4. "Walk on By" (Bacharach, David) – 2:56
5. "If I Had a Hammer" (Lee Hays, Pete Seeger) – 3:05
6. "Strangers in the Night" (Bert Kaempfert, Charles Singleton, Eddie Snyder) – 2:41
7. "Better Use Your Head" (Victoria Pike, Teddy Randazzo) – 2:52
8. "Time" (Michael Merchant) – 3:40
9. "Secret Agent Man" (Steve Barri, P. F. Sloan) – 2:35
10. "Pretty Flamingo" (Mark Barkan) – 2:27
11. "Red Rubber Ball" (Simon, Bruce Woodley) – 2:36

=== Bonus tracks 1997 Columbia records reissue ===
1. "All That Jazz" (B. Carter, A. Stillman) – 2:10 - arranged & conducted by Mort Garson, rec. 18 Apr 1966, from the 1966 film A Man Called Adam, single #4-43677, rel. 6 Jun 1966
2. "You Don't Have To Say You Love Me" (P. Donaggio, V. Pollavincini, V. Wickhams, S. Napier-Bell) – 2:32 - arranged & conducted by Mort Garson, rec. 10 Jun 1966, previously unreleased
3. "Dominique's Discotheque" (R. Straigis, H. Linsley, B. Ross) - 2:56 - arranged & conducted by Shorty Rogers, rec. 28 Jan 1966, single #4-43550 rel. 14 Mar 1966
4. "The Power of Love" (Delaney Bramlett, Joey Cooper) - 2:29 - arranged & conducted by Shorty Rogers, rec. 28 Jan 1966, single #4-43550 rel. 14 Mar 1966
5. "Lover's Roulette" (P.R. Arenas, C. Edmonds, J. Thompson) - 2:34 - arranged & conducted by Ernie Freeman, rec 27 Apr 1967, single #4-44180, 7 Jun 1967
6. "Ciao Baby" - 2:05 - arranged & conducted by Ernie Freeman, rec 27 Apr 1967, previously unreleased
7. "Molly Marlene" (T. Thornton) - 2:14 - arranged & conducted by Ernie Freeman, rec 27 Apr 1967, previously unreleased
8. "The King" - 1:58 - arranged & conducted by Ernie Freeman, rec 27 Apr 1967, previously unreleased
9. "Lima Lady" (M. Curtis, J. Meyer) - 2:24 - arranged & conducted by Arnold Goland, rec 17 Nov 1967, single #4-44399, 5 Dec 1967
10. "Wait Until Dark" (Henry Mancini, Jay Livingston, Ray Evans) - 2:40 - arranged & conducted by Arnold Goland, rec 17 Nov 1967, single #4-44399, 5 Dec 1967
11. "Only When I'm Lonely" - 2:57 - arranged & conducted by Arnold Goland, rec 17 Nov 1967, previously unreleased

== Personnel ==
- Mel Tormé - vocal, drums
- Howard Roberts - guitar
- James Getzoff, Robert Barene, Henry Ross, Marshall Sosson, Sidney Sharp, Arnold Belnick, Nathan Ross, Harry Bluestone - violin
- Myron Sadler, Joseph DiFiore - viola
- Armand Karpoff, Frederick Seykora - cello
- Michael Melvoin - piano
- Gary Coleman - vibraphone
- Jim Gordon - drums
- Al McKibbon - Bass guitar
