= Tormé: A New Album =

Studio album by Mel Tormé
- Released: 1977
- Recorded: June, 1977, London
- Genre: Vocal jazz
- Length: 39:08
- Label: Gryphon Records

Mel Tormé chronology
| Mel Tormé live at the Maisonette (1975) | Tormé: A New Album (1977) | Together Again: For the First Time (1978) |

Alternative cover

Alternative cover / title
- DCC Classics CD release

Professional ratings
Review scores
| Source | Rating |
|---|---|
| Allmusic | 3/5 stars |

Tormé: A New Album is a 1977 studio album by Mel Tormé. The album has also been re-issued as, Mel Tormé: The London Sessions and with additional "bonus" tracks as A New Album, London Sessions Complete Edition.

Tormé had not released a studio album since 1969, and the late 1970s would see him return to recording, with critical and commercial success.

== Track listing ==
LP side A

1. "All in Love Is Fair" (Stevie Wonder)
2. "The First Time Ever I Saw Your Face" (Ewan MacColl)
3. "New York State of Mind" (Billy Joel)
4. "Stars" (Janis Ian)

LP side B

1. "Send in the Clowns" (Stephen Sondheim)
2. "Ordinary Fool" (Paul Williams)
3. Medley
  1. "(Ah, the Apple Trees) When the World Was Young" (M. Philippe Gerard, Angela Vannier, Johnny Mercer)
  2. "Yesterday When I was Young" (Charles Aznavour, Herbert Kretzmer)
4. "Bye Bye Blackbird" (Mort Dixon, Ray Henderson)

Bonus tracks on Paddle Wheel Records' A New Album, London Sessions Complete Edition CD re-issue:

9. "It's Too Late"
10. "Never Look Back"
11. "Charade"
12. "Like A Lover"
13. "What's This"

== Personnel ==
=== Performance ===
- Mel Tormé - vocals, arranger
- Phil Woods - alto saxophone
- Gordon Beck - keyboards
- Barry Miles
- Vic Juris - guitar
- Brian Hodges - electric bass
- Terry Silverlight - drums
- Christopher Gunning - arranger, conductor
