= Harry Link =

American vaudeville actor and songwriter

Harry Link (born John Harry Linkey, January 25, 1896, Philadelphia – July 5, 1956, New York City) was an American vaudeville actor and songwriter. He wrote and co-wrote several well-known jazz standards.

== Career ==
Link studied at the Wharton School of Business but was already publishing songs by his late teens; in 1914, he co-wrote "Along Came Ruth" with Irving Berlin. He attempted a career in acting, appearing in the 1916 film The Masked Rider, but had little luck and soon gave it up for a sustained career in music publishing.

In 1929, he co-wrote "I've Got a Feeling I'm Falling" with Billy Rose and Fats Waller. Waller turned the song into a hit; Louis Armstrong recorded the tune, as did many others. Link and Waller also co-wrote "Gone" with Andy Razaf and "I Hate to Leave You Now" with Dorothy Dick (née Dorothy Dickenshied; 1895–1986), whom Link married in 1916 in Philadelphia. Armstrong also recorded a version of "I Hate to Leave You Now".

Link and Dick went on to collaborate extensively. Among their songwriting credits (often in tandem with other writers) are "By My Side", "Until We Meet Again Sweetheart", and "Peelin' the Peach". He wrote music for Blondie of the Follies in 1932. In 1936 he wrote "These Foolish Things" along with Jack Strachey and Eric Maschwitz, which became one of the year's biggest numbers; hit versions include one by Benny Goodman and another by Teddy Wilson and Billie Holiday.

After 1937 Link concentrated on the business end of the publishing industry.
