= Happy Holiday (song) =

Song by Bing Crosby with the Music Maid and Hal and John Scott Trotter and His Orchestra
- Published: 1942
- Genre: Christmas music
- Length: 2:28
- Songwriter: Irving Berlin

"Happy Holiday" (sometimes performed as "Happy Holidays") is a popular song composed by Irving Berlin in 1941 and published the following year.

== History ==
"Happy Holiday" was introduced by Bing Crosby and Marjorie Reynolds (dubbed by Martha Mears) in the 1942 film Holiday Inn in a scene showing the Inn opening for the first time on New Year's Eve.

Jo Stafford was the first to release the song on a Christmas album, on her album Happy Holiday in 1955.

The Kay Thompson song "The Holiday Season" is often paired with "Happy Holiday" as a medley, a version popularized by Andy Williams.

== Renditions ==
Bing Crosby recorded the song on June 1, 1942, for Decca Records with John Scott Trotter and His Orchestra. Other notable versions include those by Jo Stafford (1955), Andy Williams (1963), and Peggy Lee (1965).

== Charts ==
=== Andy Williams "Happy Holiday/The Holiday Season" version ===
Chart (2019–2024)	Peak position
Canada Hot 100 (Billboard)	42
US Billboard Hot 100	18
