= Vincent DeRosa =

American hornist (1920–2022)

- Born: Vincent Ned DeRosa; October 5, 1920; Kansas City, Missouri, U.S.
- Origin: Los Angeles, California, U.S.
- Died: July 18, 2022 (aged 101) La Cañada Flintridge, California, U.S.
- Genres: Classical, jazz, soundtrack
- Instrument: French horn
- Formerly of: Frank Sinatra

Vincent Ned DeRosa (October 5, 1920 – July 18, 2022) was an American hornist who served as a studio musician for Hollywood soundtracks and other recordings from 1935 until his retirement in 2008. Because his career spanned over 70 years, during which he played on many film and television soundtracks and as a sideman on studio albums, he is considered to be one of the most recorded brass players of all time. He set "impeccably high standards" for the horn, and became the first horn for Henry Mancini, Lalo Schifrin, Alfred Newman, and John Williams, among others, with Williams calling him "one of the greatest instrumentalists of his generation." DeRosa contributed to many of the most acclaimed albums of the 20th century, including some of the biggest-selling albums by artists as diverse as Frank Sinatra, Barry Manilow, Frank Zappa, Boz Scaggs, Ella Fitzgerald, Harry Nilsson, Stan Kenton, Henry Mancini, The Monkees, Sammy Davis Jr., and Mel Tormé.

== Early life and training ==
DeRosa was born in Kansas City, Missouri, on October 5, 1920. His family moved to Chicago about a year after his birth. His father, John DeRosa, was a professional clarinetist; his mother, Clelia DeRubertis DeRosa, was an accomplished singer. He began his horn studies at age ten with Peter Di Lecce, Principal Horn of the Chicago Symphony Orchestra. In 1932, the family moved to Los Angeles. While still a teenager, DeRosa studied briefly with his uncle, Vincent DeRubertis. He also studied with and played several times for Alfred Edwin Brain Jr., Dennis Brain's uncle.

== Career ==
DeRosa began his professional career in 1935 by substituting for another player in the San Carlo Opera Company's production of La traviata. When the U.S. entered World War II, DeRosa enlisted before he could be drafted and was assigned to play with the California Army Air Forces radio production unit. He was discharged in 1943 because he was the head of a household. However, eventually he was recalled to service and was demobilized in 1945.

=== Recording ===
DeRosa's recording career began shortly after his military service ended, and he quickly established himself as the first-call session horn player in the recording industry. He recorded extensively in several genres, including jazz, rock, pop, and classical. His name has become a metaphor for prolific recording: in Collected Thoughts on Teaching and Learning, Creativity, and Horn Performance Douglas Hill refers to a prolific session player as "the Vince DeRosa of the London freelance scene."

=== Albums ===
As a jazz player, he is recognized as one of the first French horn players to forge a career as a jazz sideman. During his career, he played on important jazz instrumental recordings, including Art Pepper's Art Pepper + Eleven – Modern Jazz Classics, Stan Kenton's Kenton / Wagner, and Johnny Mandel's I Want to Live!. He also appeared on landmark recordings by jazz vocalists, including Mel Tormé and the Marty Paich Dek-Tette, Ella Fitzgerald Sings the Rodgers & Hart Song Book and Ella Fitzgerald Sings the George and Ira Gershwin Song Book, Sammy Davis Jr.'s The Wham of Sam, and June Christy's Something Cool. DeRosa also contributed to important jazz fusion recordings, including David Axelrod's Song of Innocence and groundbreaking albums by Jean-Luc Ponty including King Kong: Jean-Luc Ponty Plays the Music of Frank Zappa.

As a sideman on pop records, his contributions to Sinatra's most important recordings are perhaps best known (see with "Work with Sinatra" below). However, he also contributed to many other hit pop recordings such as Barry Manilow's triple-platinum album Even Now, Neil Diamond's hit September Morn, and Louis Armstrong's I’ve Got the World on a String and Louis Under the Stars, two of the most important pop albums from Armstrong's later catalog.

As a sideman on rock, blues, and funk records, DeRosa contributed to seminal recordings such as Frank Zappa's first solo album Lumpy Gravy, Boz Scaggs' quintuple-platinum Silk Degrees, and Tower of Power's Back to Oakland, and to rock cult classics such as Harry Nilsson's Son of Schmilsson and Van Dyke Parks's Song Cycle.

DeRosa was also an accomplished classical player. He was the hornist on the album The Intimate Bach which received a Grammy Nomination for Best Classical Performance – Chamber Music (1962). Music critic Alfred Frankenstein wrote of DeRosa's performance on this record, "This is the most astonishing example of virtuosity on the horn I have ever heard on records...To play as lightly and speedily as a harpsichord, right out in the open with a minimum of support, is to give an incredible performance."

=== Soundtracks ===
In addition to his work as a sideman, DeRosa appeared on many prominent soundtracks for film, musicals, and TV, including Carousel, Close Encounters of the Third Kind, Edward Scissorhands, How the West Was Won, Jaws, Mary Poppins, Midway, Oklahoma, My Fair Lady, Rocky, The Days of Wine and Roses, The Magnificent Seven, The Music Man, and The Sound of Music. The television programs for which he played include Batman, Bonanza, Dallas, Hawaii Five-O, Peter Gunn, Star Trek, The Rockford Files, and The Simpsons.

=== Work with Frank Sinatra ===
DeRosa's playing and career are closely associated with Frank Sinatra's recordings because of Frank Sinatra's fame, the number of seminal Sinatra albums on which DeRosa played, and two highly publicized accounts of Sinatra's comments to or about DeRosa (see below). DeRosa played first horn on many albums considered to be the greatest in Sinatra's catalog and among the greatest of all time, including In the Wee Small Hours, Songs for Swingin’ Lovers!, Frank Sinatra Sings for Only the Lonely, and Strangers in the Night.

Sinatra was not known for openly complimenting his musicians (drummer Irv Cottler once said, "Frank will never come right out and tell you that you swung your ass off"). However, he publicly acknowledged DeRosa's excellence. In Sinatra: The Chairman, author James Kaplan discusses DeRosa with Milt Bernhart, a trombonist who had played with both Sinatra and DeRosa on many occasions:

"Another time, Bernhart remembered, Sinatra praised French horn player Vince DeRosa on executing a difficult passage by telling the band, 'I wish you guys could have heard Vince DeRosa last night—I could have hit him in the mouth!' We all knew what he meant—he had loved it!" Bernhart said. "And believe me, he reserved comments like that only for special occasions."

Another reason DeRosa is closely associated with Sinatra is that an exchange between DeRosa and Sinatra was featured in the article "Frank Sinatra Has a Cold" for Esquire by Gay Talese in 1966. The article became one of the most famous pieces of magazine journalism ever written, and is often considered not only the greatest profile of Frank Sinatra but one of the greatest celebrity profiles ever written. In his piece, Talese documents the following touching conversation between Sinatra and DeRosa:

When a French horn player, a short Italian named Vincent DeRosa who has played with Sinatra since The Lucky Strike "Hit Parade" days on radio, strolled by, Sinatra reached out to hold him for a second.
"Vincenzo," Sinatra said, "how's your little girl?" "She's fine, Frank."
"Oh, she's not a little girl anymore," Sinatra corrected himself, "she's a big girl now."
"Yes, she goes to college now. U.S.C."
"That's great."
"She's also got a little talent, I think, Frank, as a singer."
Sinatra was silent for a moment, then said, "Yes, but it's very good for her to get her education first, Vincenzo."
Vincent DeRosa nodded.
"Yes, Frank," he said, and then he said, "Well, good night, Frank." "Good night, Vincenzo."

The exchange was given renewed exposure by Pulitzer Prize-winning music critic Alex Ross in his book Listen to This. In the chapter "Edges of Pop," Ross highlights the famous article and calls the exchange between DeRosa and Sinatra "The sweetest moment in Gay Talese’s classic Esquire profile."

One reason for DeRosa's appearance on so many of Sinatra's albums is that DeRosa was the preferred first horn for Sinatra's frequent collaborator Nelson Riddle (Riddle's biographer refers to DeRosa as a "horn player extraordinaire"). As an example of Riddle's esteem for DeRosa, he chose DeRosa as a featured soloist on the Sinatra album Close to You, an album on which the Hollywood String Quartet and typically one soloist per song accompanied Sinatra. Riddle was deliberate in his choice of sideman, selecting trumpeter Harry "Sweets" Edison, clarinetist Mahlon Clark, and DeRosa for this project.

=== Work with Henry Mancini ===
While DeRosa might be most closely associated with Frank Sinatra, he is also well known as Henry Mancini's first-call horn player, working with Mancini on at least eight albums and many film scores. The albums included The Music from Peter Gunn, the first album to win the Grammy award for Album of the Year (1959) and was selected by the Library of Congress as a 2010 addition to the National Recording Registry, which selects recordings annually that are "culturally, historically, or aesthetically significant." The album's title song features famous, difficult-to-execute French horn lines, with DeRosa as first chair.

Mancini often composed his themes with a favorite player in mind: "Sometimes when I hear people play, especially if they’re distinctive players, I actually try to incorporate their sound into a particular score."

Days of Wine and Roses
DeRosa playing the opening horn solo from "Days of Wine and Roses"

Mancini had Vince DeRosa in mind when he composed his Academy Award-winning theme to the film Days of Wine and Roses: "For the first yawning notes of this score, he was hearing the solid round tone of studio veteran French horn soloist Vince DeRosa, and that became the voice of solitude in the film." This theme won the 1962 Academy Award for best song.

== Influence ==
DeRosa's impact on studio horn playing was significant, and set a new standard for studio horn parts. As a sideman on thousands of sessions and a horn instructor at USC and elsewhere, DeRosa influenced many musicians and composers. The list below documents composers and musicians who are publicly acknowledged to have studied with, or been influenced by, DeRosa's teaching or playing.

=== Composers ===
- John Williams (American composer who has written some of the most popular and recognizable film scores in cinematic history). At DeRosa's retirement concert/celebration, composer John Williams wrote:

"Vince Derosa's contribution to American music can't be overstated. He was the premier first horn player on virtually every recording to come out of Hollywood for over forty years. He represented the pinnacle of instrumental performance and I can honestly say that what I know about writing for the French horn, I learned from him. DeRosa was an inspiration for at least two generations of composers working in Hollywood and beyond. He is respected world-wide and universally regarded as one of the greatest instrumentalists of his generation. It has been a privilege to have worked with him all these many years."

- Henry Mancini (American composer, conductor and arranger, often cited as one of the greatest composers in the history of film). Mancini had Vince DeRosa in mind when he composed his Academy Award-winning theme to the film Days of Wine and Roses.

=== Horn players ===
The following horn players have publicly acknowledged studying with DeRosa.

- Nathan Campbell (Professor of French horn, The Master's University)
- James Thatcher (Session player, recipient of the Most Valuable Player Award from the National Association of Recording Arts and Sciences)
- Brian O'Connor (Professor of Horn at UCLA)
- Henry Sigismonti (Principal Horn of the Los Angeles Philharmonic under Zubin Mehta)
- George Price (Longtime third Horn of the Los Angeles Philharmonic)
- Suzette Moriarty (California Philharmonic)
- Laura Brenes (Principal horn player for the Redlands Symphony Orchestra)
- Richard Todd (Professor of horn at Frost School of Music)
- Dylan S. Hart (Principal horn of the Hollywood Bowl Orchestra under Thomas Wilkins)

== Awards and honors ==
- Grammy Nomination: Best Classical Performance – Chamber Music for The Intimate Bach (1962)
- The Vince DeRosa Scholarship Fund was established in DeRosa's name and currently supports the IHS Solo Contest (2003)
- Elected as an honorary member of the International Horn Society (2004)
- The Hollywood Epic Brass Organ and Percussion Ensemble recorded The Vince DeRosa Tribute Album (2014)
- Local 47 Lifetime Achievement Award (2017)

== Personal life ==
Beginning in the late 1950s, DeRosa played a Conn 8D horn. In the 1950s he taught a small number of students at the Los Angeles Conservatory of Music but otherwise taught formally at the University of Southern California from 1974 to 2005. Since retiring in 2008, DeRosa split his time between his residences in La Canada, CA, Maui, and Montana.

DeRosa's uncle, Vincent DeRubertis, also played with Sinatra on at least one occasion, on the soundtrack for High Society. Like his nephew, DeRubertis also contributed to many soundtracks.

DeRosa died on July 18, 2022, at the age of 101.

== Discography ==
With The 5th Dimension

- Earthbound (ABC, 1975)

With Laurie Allyn

- Paradise (VSOP, 1957)

With Laurindo Almeida

- The Intimate Bach, Duets with the Spanish Guitar Vol.2 (Capitol, 1962)

With American Flyer

- American Flyer (United Artists, 1976)

With Louis Armstrong

- Louis Under the Stars (Verve, 1958)
- I've Got the World on a String (Verve, 1960)

With Louis Armstrong and Ella Fitzgerald

- Porgy and Bess (Verve, 1958)

With David Axelrod

- Song of Innocence (Capitol, 1968)

With Hoyt Axton

- Life Machine (A&M, 1974)

With The Blackbyrds

- Unfinished Business (Fantasy, 1976)

With Vernon Burch

- Love-a-Thon (Chocolate City, 1978)

With Red Callender

- Callender Speaks Low (Crown, 1954)

With Glen Campbell

- Somethin' 'Bout You Baby I Like (Capitol, 1980)

With Chicago

- Chicago X (Columbia, 1976)

With June Christy

- Something Cool (Capitol, 1954)
- Fair and Warmer! (Capitol, 1957)
- The Song is June! (Capitol, 1958)
- This Time of Year (Capitol, 1961)
- Do-Re-Mi (Capitol, 1961)

With Stanley Clarke

- Rocks, Pebbles and Sand (Epic, 1980)

With Nat King Cole

- Nat King Cole Sings for Two in Love (Capitol, 1953)
- Ballads of the Day (Capitol, 1956)
- To Whom It May Concern (Capitol, 1959)

With Natalie Cole

- Unforgettable... with Love (Elektra, 1991)

With Judy Collins

- Hard Times for Lovers (Capitol, 1979)

With Alice Coltrane

- Eternity (Warner Bros., 1975)

With Rita Coolidge

- Rita Coolidge (A&M, 1971)

With Sonny Criss

- Warm and Sonny (Muse, 1975)

With Michael Davis

- Brass Nation (Hip-Bone Music, 2000)

With Miles Davis

- Dingo (Warner Bros., 1991)

With Sammy Davis Jr.

- The Wham of Sam (Reprise, 1961)
- Sammy Davis Jr. Belts the Best of Broadway (Reprise, 1962)

With Sammy Davis Jr. and Carmen McRae

- Boy Meets Girl (Decca, 1957)
- Porgy and Bess (Decca, 1959)

With John Denver

- An Evening with John Denver (RCA, 1975)

With Teri DeSario

- Teri DeSario (Casablanca, 1979)

With Neil Diamond

- Jonathan Livingston Seagull (Columbia, 1973)
- Serenade (Columbia, 1974)
- September Morn (Columbia, 1979)

With Lamont Dozier

- Out Here on My Own (ABC Records, 1973)

With Earth, Wind & Fire

- Faces (Columbia, 1980)

With Billy Eckstine

- Once More with Feeling (Roulette, 1960)

With The Emotions

- Rejoice (Columbia, 1977)

With Juan García Esquivel

- See it in Sound (RCA, 1999, recorded 1960)

With Don Fagerquist

- Music to Fill a Void (Mode, 1957)

With José Feliciano

- Angela (Private Stock, 1976)

With Clare Fischer

- Extension (Pacific Jazz, 1963)

With Ella Fitzgerald

- Ella Fitzgerald Sings the Rodgers & Hart Song Book (Verve, 1956)
- Ella Swings Lightly (Verve, 1958)
- Ella Fitzgerald Sings the George and Ira Gershwin Song Book (Verve, 1959)

With Dan Fogelberg and Tim Weisberg

- Twin Sons of Different Mothers (Epic, 1978)

With Donna Fuller

- My Foolish Heart (Liberty, 1957)

With Judy Garland

- The Letter (Capitol, 1959)

With Barry Gibb

- Now Voyager (Polydor, 1984)

With Harpers Bizarre

- Feelin' Groovy (Warner Bros., 1967)

With Debbie Harry

- KooKoo (Chrysalis Records., 1981)

With Neil Hefti

- Jazz Pop (Reprise, 1962)

With The Hi-Lo's

- The Hi-Lo's And All That Jazz (Columbia, 1958)

With Bill Holman

- Bill Holman's Great Big Band! (Capitol, 1960)

With Paul Horn

- Plenty of Horn (Dot, 1958)

With Freddie Hubbard

- Ride Like the Wind (Elektra, 1982)

With Gordon Jenkins

- Soul of a People (Mainstream, 1967)

With Stan Kenton

- Back to Balboa (Capitol, 1958)
- Kenton / Wagner (Capitol, 1964)
- Stan Kenton Conducts the Los Angeles Neophonic Orchestra (Capitol, 1965)
- Stan Kenton Presents Gabe Baltazar (Creative World Records, 1979)

With Peggy Lee

- The Man I Love (Capitol, 1957)
- If You Go (Capitol, 1961)
- Sugar 'n' Spice (Capitol, 1962)
- In Love Again! (Capitol, 1964)
- Let's Love (Atlantic, 1974)

With Henry Mancini

- The Music from Peter Gunn (RCA 1959)
- The Blues and the Beat (RCA, 1960)
- Mr. Lucky Goes Latin (RCA, 1961)
- Days of Wine and Roses (soundtrack) (Warner Bros., 1962)
- Uniquely Mancini (RCA, 1963)
- A Merry Mancini Christmas (RCA, 1966)
- Mancini '67 (RCA, 1967)
- Country Gentleman (RCA, 1974)

With Johnny Mandel

- I Want to Live (United Artists, 1958)
- The Sandpiper (Verve, 1965)

With Chuck Mangione

- Chase the Clouds Away (A&M, 1975)
- Bellavia (A&M, 1988)

With Gap Mangione

- Suite: Lady (A&M, 1978)

With Barry Manilow

- Even Now (Arista, 1978)

With Shelly Manne

- Concerto for Clarinet & Combo (Contemporary, 1957)
- Manne–That's Gershwin! (Capitol, 1965)

With Skip Martin

- Scheherajazz (Stereo-Fidelity, 1959)

With Johnny Mathis and Deniece Williams

- That's What Friends Are For (A&M, 1978)

With Billy May

- Billy May's Big Fat Brass (Capitol, 1958)
- Sorta-Dixie (Capitol, 1954)

With Les McCann

- The Man (A&M, 1978)

With Carmen McRae

- Carmen for Cool Ones (Decca, 1958)
- The Sound of Silence (Atlantic, 1968)

With Sérgio Mendes

- Brasil '88 (Elektra, 1978)

With The Monkees

- Headquarters (RCA, 1967)
- Pisces, Aquarius, Capricorn & Jones Ltd. (RCA, 1967)
- The Birds, The Bees & The Monkees (RCA, 1968)
- Instant Replay (RCA, 1969)

With Mystic Moods Orchestra

- Extensions (Philips, 1969)

With Oliver Nelson

- Skull Session (Flying Dutchman, 1975)

With Michael Nesmith

- The Wichita Train Whistle Sings (Dot, 1968)

With Sammy Nestico

- Dark Orchid (Palo Alto, 1981)

With Harry Nilsson

- Son of Schmilsson (RCA, 1972)
- ...That's the Way It Is (RCA, 1976)

With Michael Omartian

- Adam Again (Myrrh, 1976)

With Lee Oskar

- My Road, Our Road (Elektra, 1981)

With Patti Page

- In the Land of Hi-Fi (EmArcy, 1956)

With Marty Paich

- The Picasso of Big-Band Jazz (Cadence, 1958)
- The Broadway Bit (Warner Bros., 1959)
- I Get a Boot Out of You (Warner Bros., 1960)

With Van Dyke Parks

- Song Cycle (Warner Bros., 1967)

With Art Pepper

- Art Pepper + Eleven - Modern Jazz Classics (Contemporary/OJC, 1961)

With David Pomeranz

- The Truth of Us (Pacific, 1980)

With Jean-Luc Ponty

- Cantaloupe Island (Blue Note, 1976)
- King Kong: Jean-Luc Ponty Plays the Music of Frank Zappa (World Pacific, 1970)

With Pure Prairie League

- Two Lane Highway (RCA, 1975)

With Johnny Richards

- Something Else by Johnny Richards (Bethlehem, 1956)

With Minnie Riperton

- Minnie (Capitol, 1979)

With Mavis Rivers

- Mavis (Reprise, 1961)

With George Roberts

- Practice Makes Perfect (DNE Records, 1969)

With Pete Rugolo

- Introducing Pete Rugolo (Columbia, 1954)
- Rugolomania (Columbia, 1955)
- Music for Hi-Fi Bugs (EmArcy, 1956)
- Out on a Limb (EmArcy 1957)
- New Sounds by Pete Rugolo (Harmony, 1957)
- An Adventure in Sound: Brass in Hi-Fi (Mercury, 1958)
- The Music from Richard Diamond (EmArcy, 1959)
- Behind Brigitte Bardot (Warner Bros., 1960)
- The Original Music of Thriller (United Recording Studios, 1961)

With Pharoah Sanders

- Love Will Find a Way (Arista, 1978)

With Arturo Sandoval

- Dream Come True (GRP, 1999)

With Boz Scaggs

- Silk Degrees (Columbia, 1976)

With Diane Schuur

- Love Songs (GRP, 1993)

With Jack Sheldon

- Jack Sheldon and His All Star Band (GNP Crescendo, 1957)

With Lalo Schifrin

- Jazz Suite on the Mass Texts (RCA Victor, 1965) with Paul Horn
- Music from Mission: Impossible (Dot, 1967)
- The Fox (soundtrack) (Warner Bros., 1968)
- There's a Whole Lalo Schifrin Goin' On (Dot, 1968)
- Kelly's Heroes (soundtrack) (MGM, 1970)
- Enter the Dragon (soundtrack) (Warner Bros., 1973)

With Doc Severinson

- Facets (Amherst, 1990)

With Horace Silver

- Silver 'n Brass (Blue Note, 1975)

With Frank Sinatra

- Christmas Songs by Sinatra (Columbia, 1948)
- In the Wee Small Hours (Capitol, 1955)
- Frank Sinatra Conducts Tone Poems of Color (Capitol, 1956)
- This Is Sinatra! (Capitol, 1956)
- Close to You (Capitol, 1957)
- Where Are You? (Capitol, 1957)
- Come Fly With Me (Capitol, 1958)
- This Is Sinatra Volume 2 (Capitol, 1958)
- Sings for Only the Lonely (Capitol, 1958)
- Look to Your Heart (Capitol, 1959)
- No One Cares (Capitol, 1959)
- Come Swing with Me! (Capitol, 1961)
- All the Way (Capitol, 1961)
- I Remember Tommy (Reprise, 1961)
- Frank Sinatra Conducts Music from Pictures and Plays (Reprise, 1962)
- Sinatra Sings of Love and Things (Capitol, 1962)
- Point of No Return (Capitol, 1962)
- All Alone (Reprise, 1962)
- Sinatra and Strings (Reprise, 1962)
- The Concert Sinatra (Reprise, 1963)
- Sinatra's Sinatra (Reprise, 1963)
- Sinatra Sings Days of Wine and Roses, Moon River, and Other Academy Award Winners (Reprise, 1964)
- Softly, as I Leave You (album) (Reprise, 1964)
- My Kind of Broadway (Reprise, 1965)
- Sinatra '65: The Singer Today (Reprise, 1965)
- Moonlight Sinatra (Reprise, 1966)
- Strangers in the Night (Reprise, 1966)
- The Sinatra Family Wish You a Merry Christmas (Reprise, 1968)
- Cycles (Frank Sinatra album) (Reprise, 1968)
- A Man Alone (album) (Reprise, 1969)
- My Way (Frank Sinatra album) (Reprise, 1969)
- Sinatra & Company (Reprise, 1971)
- Ol' Blue Eyes Is Back (Reprise, 1973)
- Some Nice Things I've Missed (Reprise, 1974)
- Trilogy: Past Present Future (Reprise, 1980)
- She Shot Me Down (Reprise, 1981)

With Judee Sill

- Heart Food (Asylum, 1973)

With JD Souther

- Black Rose (Asylum, 1976)

With Duane Tatro

- Duane Tatro's Jazz For Moderns (Contemporary, 1956)

With The Temptations

- Bare Back (Atlantic, 1978)

With Cal Tjader

- West Side Story (Fantasy, 1961)

With Mel Tormé

- Mel Tormé and the Marty Paich Dek-Tette (Bethlehem, 1955)
- Mel Tormé Sings Fred Astaire (Bethlehem, 1956)
- The Complete Porgy and Bess (Bethlehem, 1956)
- California Suite (Bethlehem, 1957)
- Mel Tormé Swings Shubert Alley (Verve, 1960)
- Swingin' on the Moon (Verve, 1960)
- Broadway, Right Now! (Verve, 1960)

With Tower of Power

- Back to Oakland (Warner Bros., 1974)

With Stanley Turrentine

- Have You Ever Seen the Rain (Fantasy, 1975)

With Sarah Vaughan

- Sarah Vaughan with Michel Legrand (Mainstream, 1972)

With Paul Weston

- Carefree (Capitol, 1959)

With Mason Williams

- A Gift of Song (Riviera, 2003)

With Frank Zappa

- Lumpy Gravy (Capitol, 1967)

== Sources ==
- Miller, Todd (2009). Carved in Stone. Fullerton, Calif.: T. Miller. ISBN 978-0-615-30095-5.
