= It's a Blue World (Mel Tormé album) =

Studio album by Mel Tormé
- Released: 1955
- Recorded: August 28–30, 1955
- Genre: Jazz
- Length: 33:15
- Label: Bethlehem

Mel Tormé chronology
Mel Tormé at the Crescendo (1955)	It's a Blue World (1955)	Mel Tormé and the Marty Paich Dek-Tette (1956)

Professional ratings
Review scores
Source	Rating
AllMusic	4.5/5 stars

It's a Blue World is an album by Mel Tormé that was released by Bethlehem Records.

== Reception ==
The Billboard review in 1955 wrote that the material was mostly standards and that Tormé "renders them in a mellow, jazz-wize manner, and sales should be good among the hipsters". AllMusic stated: "Tormé invested the songs with warmth and confidence. Recorded and released around the time he turned 30, It's a Blue World marked a turning point in Mel Tormé's recording career."

In his 2023 book Let's Do It - The Birth of Pop Music: A History, Bob Stanley noted the similarities between Blue World and Frank Sinatra's In the Wee Small Hours, released earlier the same year. He went on to praise the record for its "twilight feel, dusk at the end of a warm summer's day".

== Track listing ==
1. "I Got It Bad (and That Ain't Good)" (Duke Ellington, Paul Francis Webster) – 3:23
2. "Till the Clouds Roll By" (Jerome Kern, P. G. Wodehouse) – 2:54
3. "Isn't It Romantic?" (Lorenz Hart, Richard Rodgers) – 3:41
4. "I Know Why (And So Do You)" (Mack Gordon, Harry Warren) – 3:50
5. "All This, and Heaven Too" (Eddie DeLange, Jimmy Van Heusen) – 3:39
6. "How Long Has This Been Going On?" (George Gershwin, Ira Gershwin) – 3:33
7. "Polka Dots and Moonbeams" (Johnny Burke, Van Heusen) – 3:56
8. "You Leave Me Breathless" (Ralph Freed, Frederick Hollander) – 3:23
9. "I Found a Million Dollar Baby (in a Five and Ten Cent Store)" (Mort Dixon, Billy Rose, Warren) – 3:43
10. "Wonderful One" (Paul Whiteman, Ferde Grofé, Theodora Morse) – 3:17
11. "It's a Blue World" (George Forrest, Robert C. Wright) – 3:45
12. "Stay as Sweet as You Are" (Gordon, Harry Revel) – 3:21

== Personnel ==
- Mel Tormé - vocals
- Marty Paich - arranger, conductor
- Al Pellegrini - arranger, conductor
- André Previn - arranger, conductor
- Russell Garcia - arranger, conductor
