= Tormé (album) =

Studio album by Mel Tormé
- Released: 1958
- Recorded: June 25–27, 1958
- Genre: Vocal jazz
- Length: 40:06
- Label: Verve
- Producer: Norman Granz

Mel Tormé chronology
Mel Tormé Sings About Love (1957)	Tormé (1958)	¡Olé Tormé!: Mel Tormé Goes South of the Border with Billy May (1959)

Professional ratings
Review scores
Source	Rating
AllMusic	4/5 stars
The Penguin Guide to Jazz Recordings	3.5/4 stars

Tormé is a 1958 studio album by Mel Tormé, arranged by Marty Paich, his first album for Verve Records.

== Track listing ==
1. "That Old Feeling" (Lew Brown, Sammy Fain) – 3:31
2. "Gloomy Sunday" (Sam M. Lewis, Rezso Seress) – 5:16
3. "Body and Soul" (Frank Eyton, Johnny Green, Edward Heyman, Robert Sour) – 3:39
4. "Nobody's Heart" (Lorenz Hart, Richard Rodgers) – 1:54
5. "I Should Care" (Sammy Cahn, Axel Stordahl, Paul Weston) – 2:57
6. "The House Is Haunted (By the Echo of Your Last Goodbye)" (Basil Adlam, Billy Rose) – 2:53
7. "Blues in the Night" (Harold Arlen, Johnny Mercer) – 8:08
8. "I Don't Want to Cry Anymore" (Victor Schertzinger) – 3:07
9. "Where Can I Go Without You?" (Peggy Lee, Victor Young) – 3:28
10. "How Did She Look?" (Gladys Shelley, Abner Silver) – 3:25
11. "'Round Midnight" (Bernie Hanighen, Thelonious Monk, Cootie Williams) – 3:16
12. "I'm Gonna Laugh You Right out of My Life" (Cy Coleman, Joseph McCarthy) – 2:33

== Personnel ==
=== Performance ===
- Mel Tormé - vocals
- Marty Paich - arranger, conductor
