= I've Got the World on a String (album) =

Studio album by Louis Armstrong
- Released: 1960
- Recorded: August 14, 1957
- Studio: Capitol (Hollywood)
- Genre: Jazz
- Length: 45:44
- Label: Verve MG VS-6101
- Producer: Norman Granz

Louis Armstrong chronology
Porgy and Bess (1959)	I've Got the World on a String (1960)	Louie and the Dukes of Dixieland (1958)

I've Got the World on a String is a 1960 album by Louis Armstrong, arranged by Russell Garcia. It was recorded on the same day as Armstrong's 1958 album Louis Under the Stars; the previous day he had finished recording Ella and Louis Again with Ella Fitzgerald.

In 1999, I've Got the World on a String was reissued with Louis Under the Stars alongside bonus material and outtakes.

== Reception ==
Professional ratings
Review scores
Source	Rating
AllMusic	4.5/5 stars
DownBeat	3.5/5 stars

Billboard magazine reviewed the album in their March 14, 1960, issue and wrote that "Satchmo plays it soft and romantic on this listenable collection of standards...Prime jockey wax".

Richard S. Ginell reviewed the reissue of the album for AllMusic and wrote that these "once-overlooked albums...are finally being appreciated as prime samplings from the autumn of Armstrong's recording career" and that "Even in the pressure cooker of a marathon session, even when confronted with standards not often associated with him, Armstrong finds the essence of each tune, bending and projecting them with his patented joie de vivre and gravel-voiced warmth every time". Ginell described Armstrong's trumpet playing as "pithy, soulful, [and] belonging to no one else" and praised Russell Garcia's arrangements for big band or strings as "...among the most atmospheric ever accorded to Armstrong. In particular, 'When Your Lover Is Gone' is sublime, with its signature riff of blasé, sighing horns and responding, rising string tremolos, and Garcia frames 'Body and Soul' with a lovely string chart whose penultimate stroke is a perfectly placed blue note".

== Track listing ==
1. "When Your Lover Has Gone" (Einar Aaron Swan) – 4:42
2. "You're the Top" (Cole Porter) – 2:33
3. "You Turned the Tables on Me" (Louis Alter, Sidney Mitchell) – 2:38
4. "Don't Get Around Much Anymore" (Duke Ellington, Bob Russell) – 3:41
5. "Little Girl Blue" (Richard Rodgers, Lorenz Hart) – 5:45
6. "Nobody Knows the Trouble I've Seen" (Traditional) – 4:56
7. "We'll Be Together Again" (Carl T. Fischer) – 4:07
8. "I've Got the World on a String" (Harold Arlen, Ted Koehler) – 2:52
9. "Do Nothing 'Til You Hear From Me" (Ellington, Russell) – 4:16
10. "I Gotta Right to Sing the Blues" (Arlen, Koehler) – 4:05

== Personnel ==
- Louis Armstrong – trumpet
- Russell Garcia – arranger, conductor
- Norman Granz – producer
- John Altoon – cover art

=== Orchestra ===
- Victor Arno, Robert Barene, Jacques Gasselin, Joseph Livoti, Dan Lube, Amerigo Marino, Erno Neufeld, Marshall Sosson, Robert Sushel, Gerald Vinci, Tibor Zelig - violins
- Myron Bacon, Abraham Hochstein, Raymond Menhennick, Myron Sandler - violas
- Justin Di Tullio, Kurt Reher, William Van Den Burg - cellos
- Frank Beach, Buddy Childers, Cappy Lewis - trumpets
- Milt Bernhart, Marshall Cram, James Henderson, Lloyd Ulyate - trombones
- Vincent DeRosa - French horn
- Bill Miller, Paul Smith - piano
- Tony Rizzi - guitar
- Joe Mondragon - double bass
- Alvin Stoller - drums
