= List of Billboard Easy Listening number ones of 1966 =

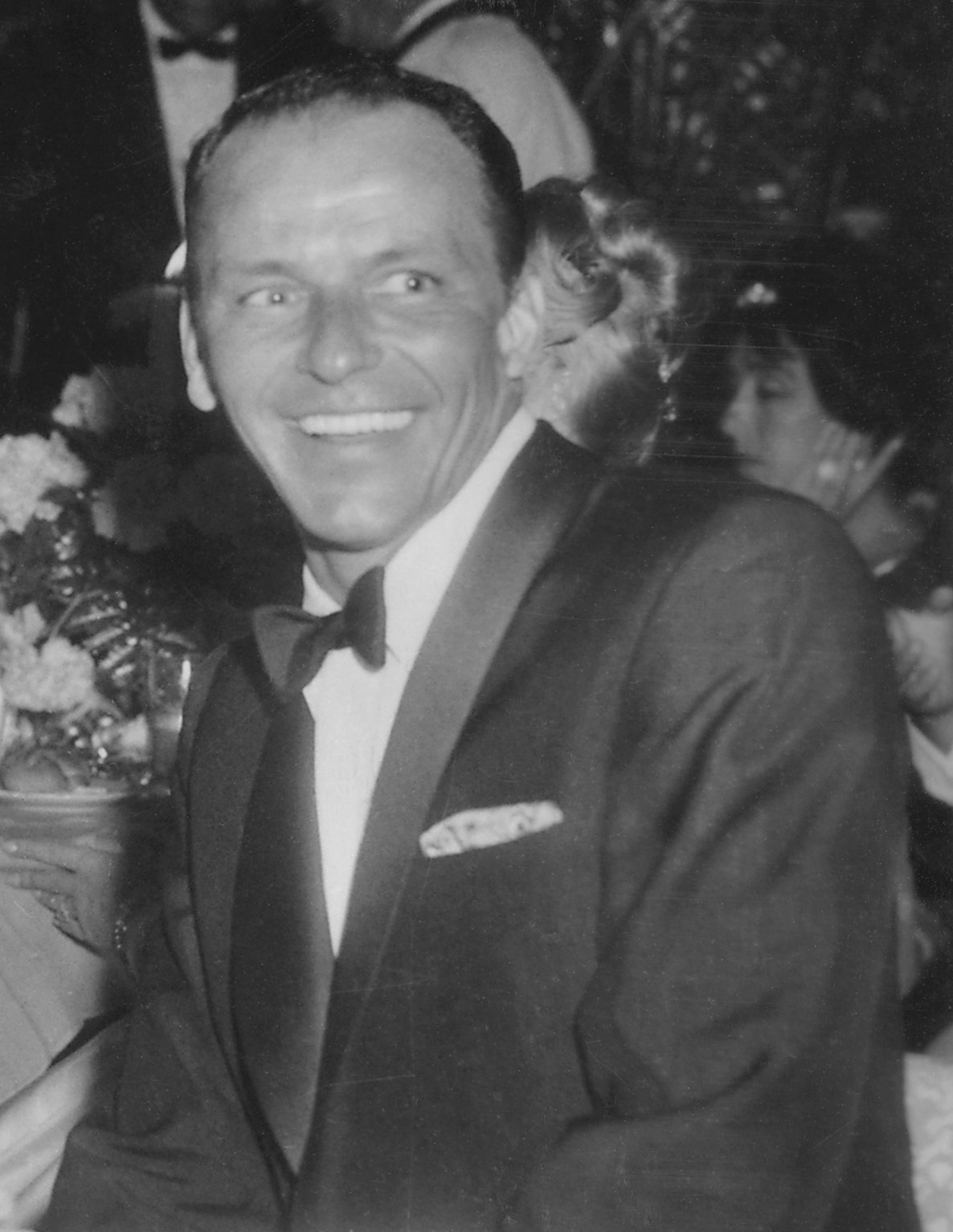
Frank Sinatra had four number ones in 1966.

In 1966, Billboard magazine published a chart ranking the top-performing songs in the United States in the easy listening market. The chart, which in 1966 was entitled Easy Listening, has undergone various name changes and since 1996 has been published under the title Adult Contemporary. In 1966, 18 songs topped the chart based on playlists submitted by easy listening radio stations and sales reports submitted by stores.

In the year's first issue of Billboard, Roger Miller moved up one place to number one with "England Swings", however the song held the top spot for only a single week before being replaced by Al Martino's "Spanish Eyes", which spent four weeks atop the chart. Immediately after Martino's run at number one, Frank Sinatra, one of the most popular and influential musical artists of the 20th century, gained his first Easy Listening chart-topper with "It Was a Very Good Year". Sinatra, who was experiencing a career resurgence at the age of 50, achieved several chart distinctions in 1966. He had the most number ones of the year, topping the chart with four singles, spent the most total weeks in the top spot with 13, and had the longest unbroken run at number one when "Strangers in the Night" spent seven consecutive weeks topping the listing. Although Sinatra reportedly did not care for "Strangers in the Night", it also topped Billboard's pop music chart, the Hot 100, received the award for best original song at the 24th Golden Globe Awards, and claimed four Grammy Awards at the 1967 ceremony.

Two other Easy Listening number ones also topped the Hot 100. In the early part of the year, Staff Sergeant Barry Sadler, a serving soldier in the United States military, reached the top of both listings with "The Ballad of the Green Berets". The patriotic song went on to be the biggest-selling single of the year in the U.S. In December, the British novelty act the New Vaudeville Band reached number one on both charts with the 1920s-styled "Winchester Cathedral", the only song of the group's career to achieve major chart success in the United States. Neither act topped the Easy Listening chart again in their career; the Ray Conniff Singers, Margaret Whiting, and Roger Williams also achieved their only number ones on the listing during 1966.

== Chart history ==
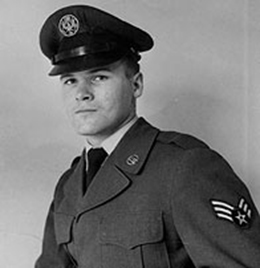
Staff Sergeant Barry Sadler had one of the biggest hits of 1966 with "The Ballad of the Green Berets".

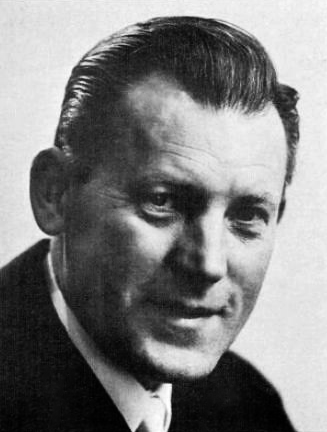
Ray Conniff and his singers topped the chart with "Somewhere, My Love", a vocal interpretation of "Lara's Theme" from the film Doctor Zhivago.

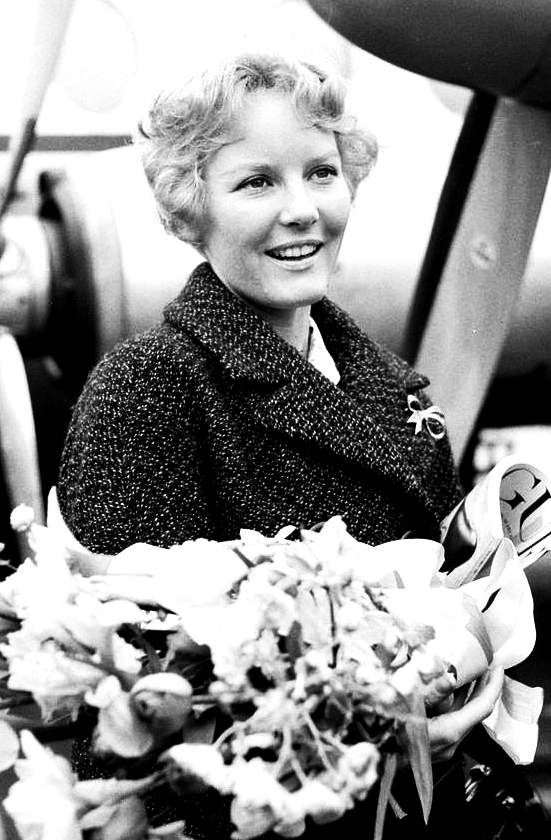
"I Couldn't Live Without Your Love" was a number one for British singer Petula Clark.

Key
†	Indicates number one on Billboard's year-end easy listening chart for 1966

Chart history
Issue date	Title	Artist(s)	Ref.
January 1	"England Swings"	Roger Miller	
January 8	"Spanish Eyes"	Al Martino	
January 15	"Spanish Eyes"	Al Martino	
January 22	"Spanish Eyes"	Al Martino	
January 29	"Spanish Eyes"	Al Martino	
February 5	"It Was a Very Good Year"	Frank Sinatra	
February 12	"Crying Time"	Ray Charles	
February 19	"Crying Time"	Ray Charles	
February 26	"Crying Time"	Ray Charles	
March 5	"The Ballad of the Green Berets"	Staff Sergeant Barry Sadler	
March 12	"The Ballad of the Green Berets"	Staff Sergeant Barry Sadler	
March 19	"The Ballad of the Green Berets"	Staff Sergeant Barry Sadler	
March 26	"The Ballad of the Green Berets"	Staff Sergeant Barry Sadler	
April 2	"The Ballad of the Green Berets"	Staff Sergeant Barry Sadler	
April 9	"I Want to Go with You"	Eddy Arnold	
April 16	"I Want to Go with You"	Eddy Arnold	
April 23	"I Want to Go with You"	Eddy Arnold	
April 30	"Together Again"	Ray Charles	
May 7	"Together Again"	Ray Charles	
May 14	"Together Again"	Ray Charles	
May 21	"Band of Gold"	Mel Carter	
May 28	"Band of Gold"	Mel Carter	
June 4	"Strangers in the Night"	Frank Sinatra	
June 11	"Strangers in the Night"	Frank Sinatra	
June 18	"Strangers in the Night"	Frank Sinatra	
June 25	"Strangers in the Night"	Frank Sinatra	
July 2	"Strangers in the Night"	Frank Sinatra	
July 9	"Strangers in the Night"	Frank Sinatra	
July 16	"Strangers in the Night"	Frank Sinatra	
July 23	"The Impossible Dream (The Quest)"	Jack Jones	
July 30	"Somewhere, My Love"	Ray Conniff Singers	
August 6	"Somewhere, My Love"	Ray Conniff Singers	
August 13	"Somewhere, My Love"	Ray Conniff Singers	
August 20	"Somewhere, My Love"	Ray Conniff Singers	
August 27	"I Couldn't Live Without Your Love"	Petula Clark	
September 3	"Born Free" †	Roger Williams	
September 10	"Born Free" †	Roger Williams	
September 17	"Born Free" †	Roger Williams	
September 24	"Born Free" †	Roger Williams	
October 1	"In the Arms of Love"	Andy Williams	
October 8	"In the Arms of Love"	Andy Williams	
October 15	"Summer Wind"	Frank Sinatra	
October 22	"Born Free" †	Roger Williams	
October 29	"Born Free" †	Roger Williams	
November 5	"The Wheel of Hurt"	Margaret Whiting	
November 12	"The Wheel of Hurt"	Margaret Whiting	
November 19	"The Wheel of Hurt"	Margaret Whiting	
November 26	"The Wheel of Hurt"	Margaret Whiting	
December 3	"Winchester Cathedral"	The New Vaudeville Band	
December 10	"Winchester Cathedral"	The New Vaudeville Band	
December 17	"Winchester Cathedral"	The New Vaudeville Band	
December 24	"Winchester Cathedral"	The New Vaudeville Band	
December 31	"That's Life"	Frank Sinatra	

== See also ==
- 1966 in music
- List of artists who reached number one on the U.S. Adult Contemporary chart
