= Mel Tormé Swings Shubert Alley =

Studio album by Mel Tormé
- Released: 1960
- Recorded: 1960
- Genre: Vocal jazz
- Length: 38:23
- Label: Verve
- Producer: Russell Garcia

Mel Tormé chronology
Back in Town (1960)	Mel Tormé Swings Shubert Alley (1960)	Swingin' On the Moon (1961)

Professional ratings
Review scores
Source	Rating
Allmusic	5/5 stars
The Penguin Guide to Jazz Recordings	4/4 stars

Mel Tormé Swings Shubert Alley is a 1960 album by Mel Tormé, arranged by Marty Paich.

The Penguin Guide to Jazz Recordings selected the album as part of its suggested “core collection” of essential recordings.

== Track listing ==
1. "Too Close for Comfort" (Jerry Bock, Larry Holofcener, George David Weiss) – 3:59
2. "Once in Love with Amy" (Frank Loesser) – 3:08
3. "A Sleepin' Bee" (Harold Arlen, Truman Capote) – 3:29
4. "On the Street Where You Live" (Alan Jay Lerner, Frederick Loewe) – 2:51
5. "All I Need Is a Girl" (Stephen Sondheim, Jule Styne) – 3:03
6. "Just in Time" (Betty Comden, Adolph Green, Styne) – 3:23
7. "Hello, Young Lovers" (Oscar Hammerstein II, Richard Rodgers) – 3:06
8. "The Surrey with the Fringe on Top" (Hammerstein, Rodgers) – 2:57
9. "Old Devil Moon" (Yip Harburg, Burton Lane) – 2:46
10. "Whatever Lola Wants" (Richard Adler, Jerry Ross) – 3:18
11. "Too Darn Hot" (Cole Porter) – 2:44
12. "Lonely Town" (Leonard Bernstein, Comden, Green) – 3:39

== Personnel ==
Performance

- Mel Tormé - vocals,
- Al Porcino - trumpet
- Stu Williamson - trumpet
- Frank Rosolino - trombone
- Vincent DeRosa - french horn
- Art Pepper - alto saxophone
- Bill Perkins - tenor saxophone
- Bill Hood - baritone saxophone
- Marty Paich - piano, arranger
- Red Callender - tuba
- Joe Mondragon - double bass
- Mel Lewis - drums

Production

- Val Valentin - engineer
- Russell Garcia - producer
