= The Wheel of Hurt =

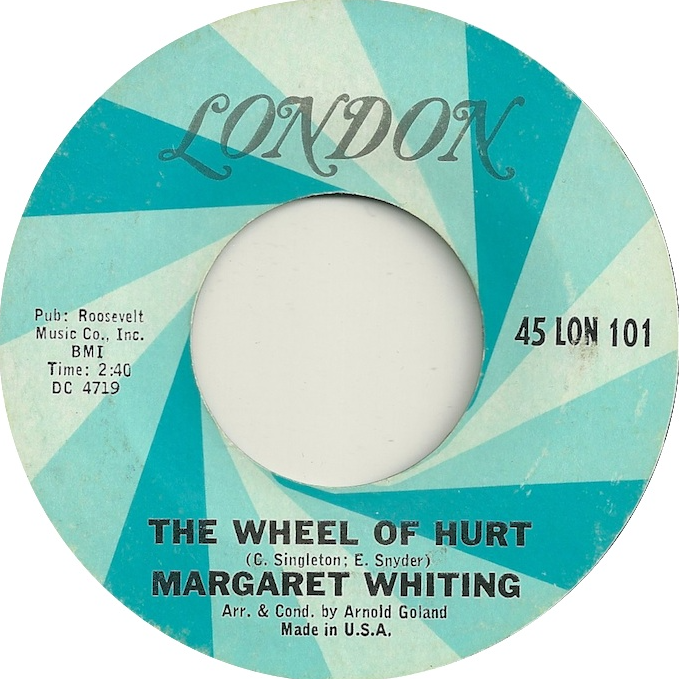

Single by Margaret Whiting

from the album The Wheel of Hurt
- B-side: "Nothing Lasts Forever"
- Released: August 1966
- Genre: Pop
- Length: 2:40
- Label: London
- Songwriters: Charles Singleton, Eddie Snyder
- Producer: Arnold Goland

Margaret Whiting singles chronology
"Somewhere There's Love" (1966)	"The Wheel of Hurt" (1966)	"Just Like a Man" (1967)

"The Wheel of Hurt" is a popular song from 1966 written by Charles Singleton and Eddie Snyder.

Two versions of "The Wheel of Hurt" were released in late 1966 at virtually the same time. One version was sung by Italian American singer Al Martino, which peaked at No. 59 on the Billboard Hot 100 chart and No. 12 on the Billboard Easy Listening chart.

The second version of "The Wheel of Hurt" was by the American performer Margaret Whiting. Released from her album of the same name, "The Wheel of Hurt" was Whiting's attempt at a comeback. In an interview with Billboard magazine from 1966, Whiting told Claude Hall that she "wanted to have a hit record again. Bobby Darin and Frank Sinatra proved it could be done." "The Wheel of Hurt" was Whiting's final song to hit the top 40 on the Hot 100 chart, where it peaked at No. 26. The song also spent four weeks at No. 1 on the Easy Listening chart in November 1966.

Other artists to have recorded "The Wheel of Hurt" include country music singer Eddy Arnold.

== See also ==
- List of Billboard Easy Listening number ones of 1966
