= I Dig the Duke! I Dig the Count! =

I Dig the Duke - I Dig the Count

Studio album by Mel Tormé
- Released: 1962
- Recorded: December 12, 1960, February 12, 1961
- Genre: Vocal jazz
- Length: 33:15
- Label: Verve
- Producer: Russell Garcia

Mel Tormé chronology
Broadway, Right Now! (1960)	I Dig the Duke - I Dig the Count (1962)	My Kind of Music (1961)

Professional ratings
Review scores
Source	Rating
AllMusic	4.5/5 stars
New Record Mirror	3/5 stars

I Dig the Duke - I Dig the Count is a 1962 album by Mel Tormé, recorded in tribute to Duke Ellington and Count Basie.

== Track listing ==
1. "I'm Gonna Go Fishin'" (Duke Ellington, Peggy Lee) – 2:23
2. "Don't Get Around Much Anymore" (D. Ellington, Bob Russell) – 2:29
3. "I Like the Sunrise" (D. Ellington, Mercer Ellington) – 3:14
4. "Take the "A" Train" (Billy Strayhorn) – 2:52
5. "Reminiscing in Tempo" (D. Ellington) – 3:17
6. "Just A-Sittin' and A-Rockin'" (D. Ellington, Lee Gaines, Strayhorn) – 2:17
7. "Down for Double" (Freddie Green) – 2:31
8. "I'm Gonna Move to the Outskirts of Town" (Jacobs, Andy Razaf, Will Weldon) – 2:31
9. "Blue and Sentimental" (Count Basie, Mack David, Jerry Livingston) – 3:55
10. "Oh, What a Night for Love" (Steve Allen, Neal Hefti) – 3:30
11. "Sent for You Yesterday (And Here You Come Today)" (Basie, Eddie Durham, Jimmy Rushing) – 2:40
12. "In the Evening (When the Sun Goes Down)" (Leroy Carr, Huddie Ledbetter, Don Raye) – 3:20

== Personnel ==
=== Performance ===
- Mel Tormé - vocals
- Joe Maini - alto saxophone
- Bill Perkins - baritone saxophone, tenor saxophone
- Teddy Edwards - tenor saxophone
- Stu Williamson - valve trombone
- Frank Rosolino - trombone
- Jack Sheldon - trumpet
- Al Hendrickson - guitar
- Jimmy Rowles - piano
- Joe Mondragon - double bass
- Mel Lewis - drums
- Shelly Manne
- Johnny Mandel - arranger, conductor

=== Production ===
- Jeff Faville - design
- Tom Hughes
- Dennis Drake - digital remastering
- Val Valentin - engineer
- Gary Giddins - liner notes
- Russell Garcia - producer
- Richard Seidel - reissue producer
