= Uniquely Mancini =

Studio album by Henry Mancini
- Released: 1963
- Studio: RCA Victor's Music Center of the World
- Label: RCA Victor
- Producer: Joe Reisman

Henry Mancini chronology
| Our Man in Hollywood (1963) | Uniquely Mancini (1963) | The Best of Mancini (1964) |

Professional ratings
Review scores
| Source | Rating |
|---|---|
| AllMusic | 3.5/5 stars |

Uniquely Mancini: The Big Band Sound of Henry Mancini is an album by Henry Mancini and His Orchestra. It was released in 1963 on RCA Victor (catalog no. LSP-2692).

It entered Billboard magazine's pop album chart on July 6, 1963, peaked at No. 5, and remained on the chart for 11 weeks. AllMusic gave the album a rating of three-and-a-half stars.

== Track listing ==
Side A

1. "Green Onions" (Booker T. Jones, Steve Cropper, Al Jackson Jr., Lewie Steinberg)
2. "Stairway to the Stars" (Mitchell Parish, Matty Malneck, Frank Signorelli)
3. "Night Train" (Oscar Washington, Lewis Simpkins, Jimmy Forrest)
4. "Lullaby of Birdland" (George Shearing, B.Y. Forster)
5. "Chelsea Bridge" (Billy Strayhorn)
6. "C Jam Blues" (Duke Ellington)

Side B

1. "Banzai Pipeline" (Henry Mancini)
2. "Rhapsody in Blue" (George Gershwin)
3. "Cheers!" (Henry Mancini)
4. "Lonesome" (Henry Mancini)
5. "The Hot Canary" (Paul Nero)
6. "Moonlight Serenade" (Mitchell Parish, Glenn Miller)

== Personnel ==
- Conrad Gozzo (lead), Frank Beach, Ray Triscari, Pete Candoli (soloist), Conte Candoli (soloist), Don Fagerquist (flugelhorn soloist) - trumpet
- Dick Nash (soloist), Jimmy Priddy, John Halliburton, George Roberts (bass trombone) - trombone
- Vincent DeRosa (soloist), Richard Perissi, John Cave, Art Maebe - French horn
- Ted Nash (alto saxophone and alto flute solo), Ronny Lang (alto flute soloist), Harry Klee, Gene Cipriano, Plas Johnson (tenor saxophone soloist) - woodwind
- Jack Sperling - drums
- Rolly Bundock - bass
- Bob Bain - guitar
- Jimmy Rowles - piano
- Larry Bunker - vibraphone, marimba
- Bobby Helfer - orchestra manager
