= Back in Town (Mel Tormé album) =

Studio album by Mel Tormé
- Released: 1959
- Recorded: April 23 – August 10, 1959
- Genre: Vocal jazz
- Length: 38:23
- Label: Verve

Mel Tormé chronology
¡Olé Tormé!: Mel Tormé Goes South of the Border with Billy May (1959)	Back in Town (1959)	Mel Tormé Swings Shubert Alley (1960)

Professional ratings
Review scores
Source	Rating
AllMusic	4.5/5 stars

Back in Town is a 1959 album by Mel Tormé and his Mel-Tones, arranged by Marty Paich.

== Track listing ==
1. "Makin' Whoopee" (Walter Donaldson, Gus Kahn) – 2:50
2. "Baubles, Bangles, & Beads" (George Forrest, Robert Wright) – 2:14
3. "What Is This Thing Called Love?" (Cole Porter) – 2:54
4. "I've Never Been in Love Before" (Frank Loesser) – 2:57
5. "Truckin'" (Rube Bloom, Ted Koehler) – 3:30
6. Bunch of the Blues: "Keester Parade"/"TNT"/Tiny's Blues" (Cy Touff, Richie Kamuca)(Tiny Kahn, Johnny Mandel) – 4:28
7. "It Happened in Monterey" (Billy Rose, Mabel Wayne) – 2:48
8. "I Hadn't Anyone Till You" (Ray Noble) – 3:36
9. "A Smooth One" (Benny Goodman, Ernie Royal) – 2:57
10. "Don't Dream of Anybody But Me" (Neal Hefti, Bart Howard) – 2:43
11. "Some Like It Hot" (Ray Biondi, Gene Krupa, Loesser) – 3:34
12. "Hit the Road to Dreamland" (Harold Arlen, Johnny Mercer) – 2:24

== Personnel ==
- Mel Tormé – vocals, arranger
- The Mel-Tones:
- Sue Allen
- Tom Kenny
- Ginny O'Connor
- Bernie Parke
- Victor Feldman – vibraphone
- Marty Paich – piano, celesta, organ, arranger
- Art Pepper – alto saxophone
- Jack Sheldon – trumpet
- Bobby Gibbons – guitar
- Barney Kessel
- Bill Pitman
- Tony Rizzi
- Tommy Tedesco
- Joe Mondragon – double bass
- Mel Lewis – drums
