= Broadway, Right Now! =

Album by Mel Tormé

Studio album by Mel Tormé
- Released: 1961
- Recorded: December 12, 1960, February 12, 1961
- Genre: Vocal jazz
- Length: 33:15
- Label: Verve

Mel Tormé chronology
Swingin' On the Moon (1960)	Broadway, Right Now! (1961)	I Dig the Duke! I Dig the Count! (1961)

Margaret Whiting chronology
Margaret Whiting Sings the Jerome Kern Songbook (1960)	Broadway, Right Now! (1960)	Past Midnight (1961)

Professional ratings
Review scores
Source	Rating
AllMusic	3.5/5 stars

Broadway, Right Now! is a 1961 album by Mel Tormé and Margaret Whiting, arranged by Russell Garcia.

== Track listing ==
1. "Fireworks"
2. "Make Someone Happy" (Betty Comden, Adolph Green, Jule Styne)
3. "Tall Hopes" (Cy Coleman, Carolyn Leigh)
4. "I Loved You Once in Silence" (Alan Jay Lerner, Frederick Loewe)
5. "Like the Wind"
6. "Hey, Look Me Over" (Coleman, Leigh)
7. "All You Need Is a Quarter"
8. "If Ever I Would Leave You" (Lerner, Loewe)
9. "Our Language of Love" (Alexandre Breffort, Marguerite Monnot)
10. "From a Prison Cell"
11. "What's New at the Zoo"
12. Medley from Wildcat: "Far Away from Home"/"Angelina" (Coleman, Leigh)/(Coleman, Leigh)

== Personnel ==
- Mel Tormé – vocals
- Margaret Whiting –vocals
- Russell Garcia – arranger, conductor
