= Margaret Whiting Sings the Jerome Kern Songbook =

Studio album by Margaret Whiting
- Released: 1960
- Recorded: 1960
- Genre: Vocal jazz
- Length: 78:00
- Label: Verve
- Producer: Norman Granz

Margaret Whiting chronology
Just a Dream (1960)	Margaret Whiting Sings the Jerome Kern Songbook (1960)	Broadway, Right Now! (1961)

Professional ratings
Review scores
Source	Rating
Allmusic	4/5 stars

Margaret Whiting Sings the Jerome Kern Songbook is a 1960 studio album by Margaret Whiting, with an orchestra conducted and arranged by Russell Garcia, focusing on the songs of Jerome Kern. Originally released as a double-LP set by Verve Records in 1960, it was reissued on CD by Universal in Japan (1998, 2007) and the United States (2002).

== Track listing ==
1. "Why Was I Born?" (Oscar Hammerstein II) – 3:22
2. "Remind Me" (Dorothy Fields) – 2:55
3. "The Song Is You" (Hammerstein) – 3:22
4. "I Won't Dance" (Hammerstein, Otto Harbach, Fields, Jimmy McHugh) – 2:25
5. "Don't Ever Leave Me" (Hammerstein) – 3:19
6. "I'm Old Fashioned" (Johnny Mercer) – 2:44
7. "All in Fun" (Hammerstein) – 3:06
8. "Why Do I Love You?" (Hammerstein) – 2:34
9. "Can't Help Lovin' Dat Man" (Hammerstein) – 3:57
10. "A Fine Romance" (Fields) – 3:39
11. "Look for the Silver Lining" (Buddy DeSylva) – 2:56
12. "All the Things You Are" (Hammerstein) – 3:49
13. "Poor Pierrot" (Harbach) – 3:23
14. "Smoke Gets in Your Eyes" (Harbach) – 3:57
15. "Let's Begin" (Harbach) – 2:15
16. "D'Ye Love Me?" (Hammerstein, Harbach) – 3:24
17. "Dearly Beloved" (Mercer) – 2:52
18. "Long Ago (and Far Away)" (Ira Gershwin) – 4:17
19. "The Way You Look Tonight" (Fields) – 3:33
20. "You Couldn't Be Cuter" (Fields) – 2:05
21. "Yesterdays" (Harbach) – 3:08
22. "Bill" (Hammerstein, Kern, P.G. Wodehouse) – 4:03
23. "She Didn't Say Yes" (Harbach) – 2:25
24. "The Touch of Your Hand" (Harbach) – 3:42

All music was written by Jerome Kern with lyricists as indicated.

== Personnel ==
- Margaret Whiting - vocals
- Russell Garcia - arranger, conductor
