= My Kind of Music (Mel Tormé album) =

Studio album by Mel Tormé
- Released: 1961
- Recorded: July 18–21, 1961
- Genre: Vocal jazz
- Length: 33:15
- Label: Verve

Mel Tormé chronology
I Dig the Duke! I Dig the Count! (1960)	My Kind of Music (1961)	Comin' Home Baby! (1962)

Professional ratings
Review scores
Source	Rating
Allmusic	3/5 stars
New Record Mirror	4/5 stars

My Kind of Music is a 1961 album by Mel Tormé. This was the last album that Tormé recorded for Verve Records.

== Track listing ==
1. "You and the Night and the Music" (Howard Dietz, Arthur Schwartz) – 2:28
2. "A Stranger in Town" (Mel Tormé) – 2:55
3. "I Guess I'll Have to Change My Plan" (Dietz, Schwartz) – 3:07
4. "Born to Be Blue" (Tormé, Robert Wells) – 2:55
5. "County Fair" (Tormé) – 6:23
6. "Dancing in the Dark" (Dietz, Schwartz) – 2:41
7. "Welcome to the Club" (Tormé) – 4:01
8. "By Myself" (Dietz, Schwartz) – 3:19
9. "The Christmas Song" (Tormé, Wells) – 2:48
10. "Alone Together" (Dietz, Schwartz) – 2:47
11. "A Shine on Your Shoes" (Dietz, Schwartz) – 3:13

== Personnel ==
- Mel Tormé - vocals
- Wally Stott - arranger, conductor
- Geoff Love
- Tony Osborne
