= Margaret Whiting =

American singer (1924–2011)

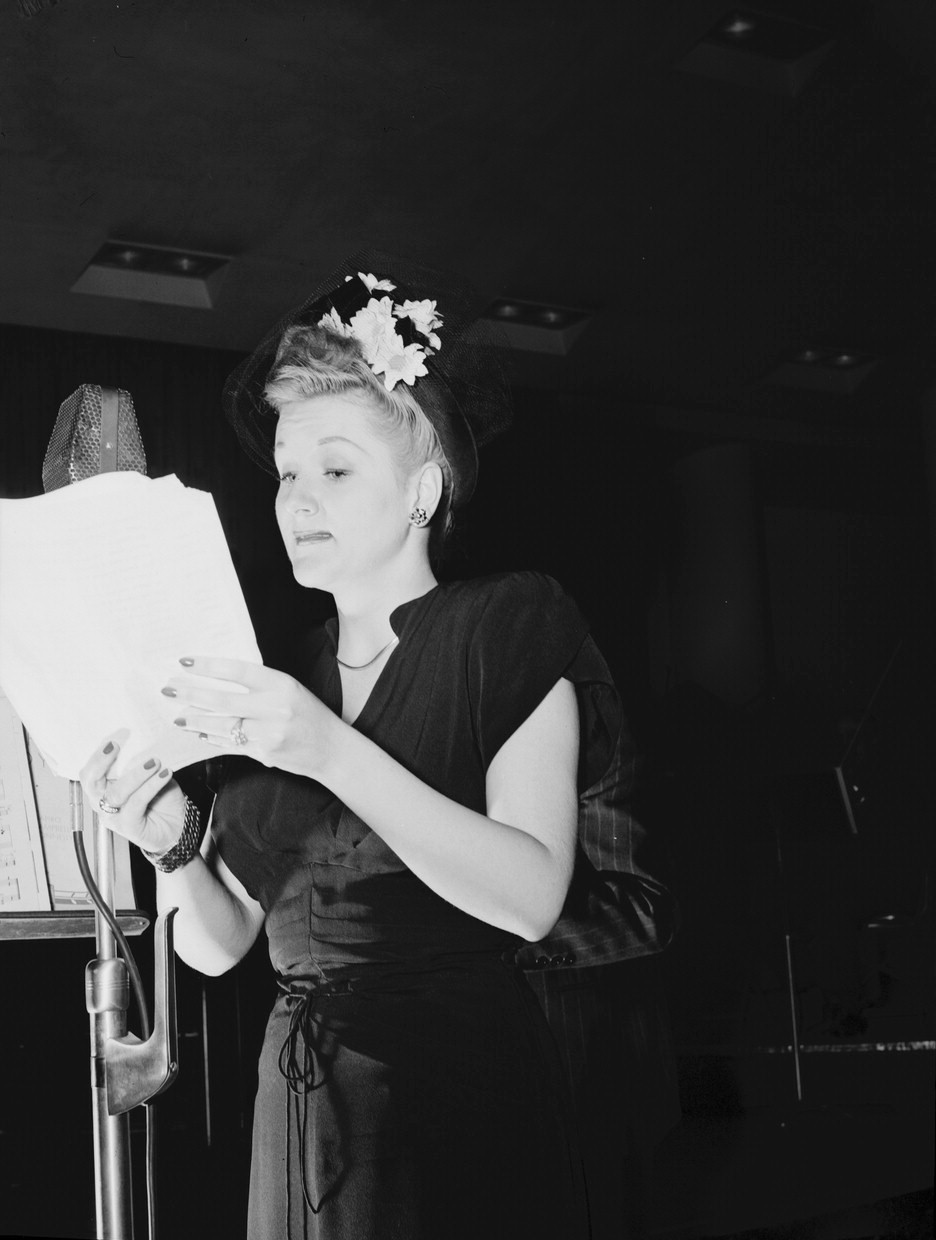
- Whiting in New York, 1940s

Background information
- Born: Margaret Eleanor Whiting; July 22, 1924; Detroit, Michigan, U.S.
- Died: January 10, 2011 (aged 86) Englewood, New Jersey, U.S.
- Genres: Jazz, traditional pop
- Occupation: Singer
- Years active: 1942–2010
- Labels: Capitol, Dot, Verve, London, Audiophile, DRG
- Website: margaretwhiting.com

Margaret Eleanor Whiting (July 22, 1924 – January 10, 2011) was an American singer of popular music who gained popularity in the 1940s and 1950s.

== Biography ==
=== Youth ===
Whiting was born in Detroit. Her family moved to Los Angeles in 1929, when she was five years old. Her father, Richard, was a composer of popular songs, including the classics "Hooray for Hollywood", "Ain't We Got Fun?", and "On the Good Ship Lollipop". Her sister, Barbara Whiting, was an actress (Junior Miss, Beware, My Lovely) and singer.

An aunt, Margaret Young, was a singer and popular recording artist in the 1920s. Whiting's singing ability was noticed at an early age and at seven she sang for singer-lyricist Johnny Mercer, with whom her father had collaborated on some popular songs, including "Too Marvelous for Words". In 1942, Mercer co-founded Capitol Records and signed Margaret to one of Capitol's first recording contracts.

=== Recording career ===
Whiting's first recordings were as featured singer with various orchestras. In 1944, her version of "Moonlight in Vermont", with Billy Butterfield's Orchestra, sold over one million copies, and was awarded a gold disc by the RIAA. Other recordings included "That Old Black Magic", with Freddie Slack and His Orchestra (1942) and "It Might as Well Be Spring", with Paul Weston and his orchestra (1945).

In 1945, Whiting began to record under her own name. "A Tree in the Meadow" was a number one hit in the summer of 1948, and her duet with country music star Jimmy Wakely, "Slippin' Around", was another number one hit in 1949. It sold 1.75 million copies, and Whiting was titled "Queen of the Jukeboxes". Other recordings included "All Through the Day" in 1945 which became a bestseller in the spring of 1946 featured in the musical Centennial Summer. Until the mid-1950s Whiting continued to record for Capitol, but as she ceased to record songs that charted as hits, she switched to Dot Records in 1957 and to Verve Records in 1960. Whiting returned to Capitol in the early 1960s and then signed with London Records in 1966. On London, Whiting landed one last major hit single in 1966, "The Wheel of Hurt", which hit No. 1 on the Easy Listening singles chart. Her final solo albums were made for Audiophile (1980, 1982, 1985) and DRG Records (1991). Her distinguished conductors and musical arrangers through the years included Buddy Bregman, Frank DeVol, Russell Garcia, Johnny Mandel, Billy May, Marty Paich, Nelson Riddle, Pete Rugolo, and Paul Weston.

=== Radio career ===
Whiting co-starred on the 15-minute musical programs The Jack Smith Show and Club Fifteen. She also was a vocalist on The Eddie Cantor Show and was in the cast of The Philip Morris Follies of 1946 and The Railroad Hour. Additionally, she was hostess on the Spotlight Revue and a featured singer on the transcribed Barry Wood Show. She also appeared in the role of a young Sophie Tucker in the January 13, 1957 CBS Radio Workshop presentation of "No Time For Heartaches".

=== Television career ===
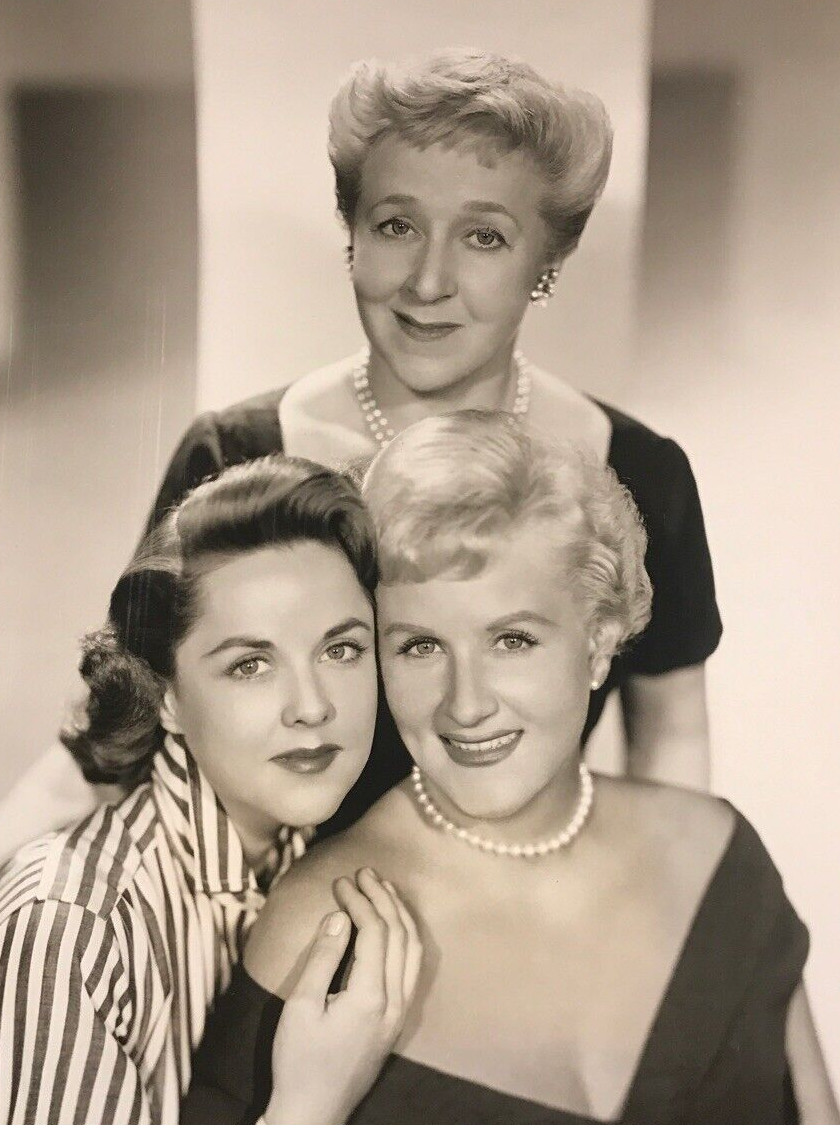
Whiting (right), with her sister Barbara (left) and Mabel Albertson (standing) in 1957

Margaret and Barbara Whiting starred as themselves in the situation comedy Those Whiting Girls. The show, produced by Desilu Productions, aired on CBS as a summer replacement series (in place of I Love Lucy) between July, 1955 and September, 1957.

Margaret Whiting was a regular guest on variety shows and talk shows throughout the 1950s, 1960s and 1970s, including Faye Emerson's Wonderful Town, when the musical series focused on Whiting's hometown of Detroit; The Big Record, The Bob Hope Show, The Colgate Comedy Hour, The Tony Martin Show, The David Frost Show, The Ed Sullivan Show, The George Jessel Show, The Guy Mitchell Show, The Jonathan Winters Show, The Merv Griffin Show, The Mike Douglas Show, The Nat King Cole Show, Over Easy, The Pat Boone Chevy Showroom, The Patti Page Show, The Red Skelton Hour, The Steve Allen Show, The Ford Show Starring Tennessee Ernie Ford, The Texaco Star Theater, The Tonight Show Starring Johnny Carson, The Virginia Graham Show, and The Voice of Firestone.

In 1960, Whiting appeared as Vinnie Berkeley in one of the last episodes, "Martial Law", of the ABC/Warner Brothers western series, Colt .45. Paul Picerni was cast in the same segment as Duke Blaine.

In 1984, Whiting appeared in the television musical movie Taking My Turn. It was basically a filmed version of the 1983 off-Broadway show in which she appeared. This ensemble show also included Marni Nixon, Tiger Haynes, and Cissy Houston among others. The music was composed by Gary William Friedman with lyrics by Will Holt. The revue was centered on issues regarding aging. The stage production opened at New York City's Entermedia Theatre on June 9, 1983. It went on to win the 1984 Outer Critic's Circle Award for Best Lyrics/Music and was nominated for the 1984 Drama Desk Award for Best Musical (losing to Stephen Sondheim's Sunday In the Park With George). A cast recording of the stage production was released and subsequently re-released on CD.

In the 2000s, Whiting was interviewed in several documentaries about singers and songwriters of her era, including Judy Garland: By Myself (2004), Fever: The Music of Peggy Lee (2004), Anita O'Day: The Life of a Jazz Singer (2007), Johnny Mercer: The Dream's on Me (2009), The Andrews Sisters: Queens of the Music Machines (2009) and Michael Feinstein's American Songbook (2010).

=== Cabaret Teacher ===
From 1989 through 2001, Whiting was the artistic director of the annual Cabaret and Performance Conference at the Eugene O'Neill Theater Center in Waterford Connecticut. With other performers such as Julie Wilson and Anne Francine as well as musical directors like Tex Arnold, she spent 10 days instructing selected professionals and amateurs in the cabaret performance process.

=== Marriages ===
Whiting was married four times, and had one child:

- Hubbell Robinson Jr., a writer, producer, and television executive (married December 29, 1948 – divorced August 18, 1949)
- Lou Busch, a ragtime pianist known as "Joe 'Fingers' Carr" (divorced; one daughter, Deborah, born 1950)
- John Richard Moore, a founder of Panavision (married 1958 – divorced)
- Jack Wrangler (John Stillman), 1970s and 1980s gay pornography film actor (married 1994, when Whiting was 70 and he was 48 – until his death from emphysema April 7, 2009)

=== Death ===
Whiting died on January 10, 2011, aged 86, from natural causes at Lillian Booth Actors Home in Englewood, New Jersey.

== Discography ==
=== Albums ===
Year	Album	Peak positions		Label
Year	Album	US BB	US CB	Label
1949	South Pacific (with Peggy Lee & Gordon MacRae)	4	—	Capitol
1950	Margaret Whiting Sings Rodgers and Hart	—	—	Capitol
1954	Love Songs by Margaret Whiting	—	—	Capitol
1956	Margaret Whiting Sings for the Starry-Eyed	—	—	Capitol
1957	Goin' Places	—	—	Dot
1958	Margaret	—	—	Dot
1959	Margaret Whiting's Great Hits	—	—	Dot
1959	Ten Top Hits	—	—	Dot
1960	Just a Dream	—	—	Dot
1960	Margaret Whiting Sings the Jerome Kern Songbook	—	—	Verve
1961	Broadway, Right Now! (with Mel Tormé)	—	—	Verve
1961	Past Midnight	—	—	MGM
1967	The Wheel of Hurt	109	95	London
1967	Maggie Isn't Margaret Anymore	—	—	London
1968	Pop Country	—	—	London
1980	Too Marvelous for Words	—	—	Audiophile
1982	Come a Little Closer	—	—	Audiophile
1985	The Lady's in Love with You	—	—	Audiophile
1991	Then and Now	—	—	DRG

=== Singles ===
Unrelated B-sides not shown

Year	Single (A-side, B-side) Both sides from same album except where indicated	Contributing Artist	Chart Positions			Album
Year	Single (A-side, B-side) Both sides from same album except where indicated	Contributing Artist	Pop	Country	AC	Album
1942	"That Old Black Magic" b/w "Hit the Road to Dreamland"	Freddie Slack & His Orchestra	10	–	–	Non-album tracks
1944	"Silver Wings in the Moonlight" b/w "Furlough Fling"	Freddie Slack & His Orchestra	19	–	–	Non-album tracks
1944	"My Ideal"	Billy Butterfield & His Orchestra	12	–	–	Margaret Whiting Sings (10-inch LP)
1944	"Moonlight in Vermont"	Billy Butterfield & His Orchestra	15	–	–	Love Songs
1945	"It Might as Well Be Spring" b/w "How Deep Is the Ocean?" (Non-album track)	Paul Weston & His Orchestra	6	–	–	Margaret Whiting Sings (10-inch LP)
1946	"All Through the Day" /	Carl Kress orchestra	11	–	–	Non-album tracks
1946	"In Love in Vain"	Carl Kress orchestra	12	–	–	Non-album tracks
1946	"Come Rain or Come Shine" b/w "Can't Help Lovin' Dat Man" (Non-album track)	Paul Weston orchestra	17	–	–	Love Songs
1946	"Along with Me" b/w "When You Make Love to Me"	Jerry Gray orchestra	13	–	–	Non-album tracks
1946	"Passe" b/w "For You, For Me, For Evermore"	Jerry Gray orchestra	12	–	–	Non-album tracks
1946	"Guilty" /	Jerry Gray orchestra	4	–	–	Margaret Whiting Sings (10-inch LP)
1946	"Oh, But I Do"	Jerry Gray orchestra	7	–	–	Non-album tracks
1947	"Beware My Heart" b/w "What Am I Gonna Do About You"	Frank De Vol orchestra	21	–	–	Non-album tracks
1947	"Spring Isn't Everything" b/w "Time After Time"	Frank De Vol orchestra	–	–	–	Non-album tracks
1947	"Old Devil Moon" /	Frank De Vol orchestra	11	–	–	Margaret Whiting Sings (10-inch LP)
1947	"Ask Anyone Who Knows"	Frank De Vol orchestra	21	–	–	Non-album track
1947	"Little Girl Blue" b/w "Thou Swell"	Frank De Vol orchestra	25	–	–	Margaret Whiting Sings Rodgers and Hart (10-inch LP)
1947	"Don't Tell Me" b/w "What Are You Doing New Year's Eve?"	Frank De Vol orchestra	–	–	–	Non-album tracks
1947	"You Do" b/w "My Future Just Passed"	Frank De Vol orchestra	5	–	–	Non-album tracks
1947	"Lazy Countryside" /	Frank De Vol orchestra	21	–	–	Non-album tracks
1947	"So Far"	Frank De Vol orchestra	14	–	–	Non-album tracks
1947	"Pass That Peace Pipe" /	Frank De Vol orchestra	8	–	–	Non-album tracks
1948	"Let's Be Sweethearts Again"	Frank De Vol orchestra	22	–	–	Non-album tracks
1948	"But Beautiful" /	Frank De Vol orchestra	21	–	–	Non-album tracks
1948	"Now Is The Hour"	Frank De Vol orchestra	2	–	–	Non-album tracks
1948	"What's Good About Goodbye" b/w "Gypsy in My Soul" (from Margaret Whiting Sings 10-inch LP)	Frank De Vol orchestra	29	–	–	Non-album tracks
1948	"Please Don't Kiss Me" b/w "April Showers" (from Margaret Whiting Sings 10-inch LP)	Frank De Vol orchestra	23	–	–	Non-album tracks
1948	"It's You or No One" b/w "Nobody But You"	Frank De Vol orchestra	–	–	–	Non-album tracks
1948	"A Tree in the Meadow" b/w "I'm Sorry But I'm Glad" (Non-album track)	Frank De Vol orchestra	1	–	–	Love Songs
1948	"What Did I Do" b/w "Heat Wave" (from Margaret Whiting Sings 10-inch LP)	Frank De Vol orchestra	–	–	–	Non-album tracks
1948	"Far Away Places" b/w "My Own True Love"	Frank De Vol orchestra	2	–	–	Non-album tracks
1948	"My Dream Is Yours" b/w "While the Angelus Was Ringing"	Frank De Vol orchestra	–	–	–	Non-album tracks
1949	"Forever and Ever" b/w "Dreamer with a Penny"	Frank De Vol orchestra	5	–	–	Non-album tracks
1949	"It's a Big, Wide, Wonderful World"	Jack Smith	–	–	–	Non-album tracks
1949	"Comme Ci, Comme Ca" b/w "Great Guns"		–	–	–	Non-album tracks
1949	"When Is Sometime" b/w "Story of My Life"		–	–	–	Non-album tracks
1949	"A Wonderful Guy" b/w "Younger Than Springtime"		12	–	–	Love Songs
1949	"Baby, It's Cold Outside" b/w "I Never Heard You Say"	Johnny Mercer	3	–	–	Non-album tracks
1949	"Slippin' Around" /	Jimmy Wakely	1	1	–	Non-album tracks
1949	"Wedding Bells"	Jimmy Wakely	30	6	–	Non-album tracks
1949	"Everytime I Meet You" b/w "It Happens Every Spring"		–	–	–	Non-album tracks
1949	"Let's Take an Old-Fashioned Walk" b/w "Paris Wakes Up and Smiles"	Frank De Vol orchestra	–	–	–	Non-album tracks
1949	"Dime a Dozen" b/w "Whirlwind"	Frank De Vol orchestra	19	–	–	Non-album tracks
1949	"St. Louis Blues" b/w "It's a Most Unusual Day"	Frank De Vol orchestra	–	–	–	Non-album tracks
1949	"Festival of Roses" b/w "Three Rivers"	Frank De Vol orchestra	–	–	–	Non-album tracks
1949	"The Sun Is Always Shining" b/w "Sorry"	Frank De Vol orchestra	–	–	–	Non-album tracks
1949	"Lucky Us" b/w "Ain't We Got Fun"	Bob Hope; Billy May orchestra	–	–	–	Non-album tracks
1949	"I'll Never Slip Around Again" b/w "Six Times a Week and Twice on Sunday"	Jimmy Wakely	8	2	–	I'll Never Slip Around Again
1949	"Have Yourself a Merry Little Christmas" b/w "Mistletoe Kiss Polka"	Frank De Vol orchestra B: The Mellomen	–	–	–	Non-album tracks
1950	"Broken Down Merry Go Round" /	Jimmy Wakely	12	2	–	Non-album tracks
1950	"The Gods Were Angry With Me"	Jimmy Wakely	17	3	–	Non-album tracks
1950	"You're an Old Smoothie" b/w "He's Funny That Way"		–	–	–	Love Songs
1950	"I Said My Pajamas (and Put on My Prayers)" b/w "Be Mine"	Frank De Vol	21	–	–	Non-album tracks
1950	"My Foolish Heart" b/w "Stay with the Happy People"	Frank DeVol orchestra	17	–	–	Non-album tracks
1950	"Let's Go to Church (Next Sunday Morning)" b/w "Why Do You Say Those Things"	Jimmy Wakely	13	2	–	Non-album tracks
1950	"A-Razz-a-Ma-Tazz" b/w "I Gotta Get Out of the Habit"	Frank De Vol & Les Baxter Chorus	–	–	–	Non-album tracks
1950	"Shawl of Calway Grey" b/w "If You Were Only Mine"		–	–	–	Non-album tracks
1950	"Blind Date" b/w "Home Cookin'"	Bob Hope	16	–	–	Non-album tracks
1950	"Close Your Pretty Eyes" b/w "Fool's Paradise" (Non-album track)	Jimmy Wakely	–	–	–	I'll Never Slip Around Again
1950	"I Didn't Know What Time It Was b/w "This Can't Be Love"	Frank De Vol orchestra	–	–	–	Margaret Whiting Sings Rodgers and Hart (10-inch LP)
1950	"I've Forgotten You" b/w "You're Mine, You"	Les Baxter Chorus	–	–	–	Non-album tracks
1950	"Friendly Star" b/w "Let's Do It Again"	Frank De Vol orchestra	–	–	–	Non-album tracks
1950	"I'm In Love With You" b/w "Don't Rock The Boat Dear"	Dean Martin	–	–	–	Non-album tracks
1950	"I've Never Been In Love Before" b/w "The Best Thing For You" (Non-album track)	Frank De Vol orchestra	–	–	–	Love Songs
1950	"A Bushel and A Peck" b/w "Beyond The Reef"	Jimmy Wakely	6	6	–	Non-album tracks
1950	"Christmas Candy" b/w "Silver Bells"	Jimmy Wakely	–	–	–	Non-album tracks
1951	"Once You Find Your Guy" b/w "A Man Is Nothing But A Wolf"		–	–	–	Non-album tracks
1951	"Let's Go To Church (Next Sunday Morning)" b/w "Easter Parade" (Non-album track)	Jimmy Wakely	–	–	–	I'll Never Slip Around Again
1951	"Faithful" b/w "Lonesome Gal"	Frank De Vol orchestra	–	–	–	Non-album tracks
1951	"Sing You Sinners" b/w "You Are The One"		–	–	–	Non-album tracks
1951	"Make The Man Love Me" b/w "We Kiss In A Shadow"	Lou Busch orchestra	–	–	–	Non-album tracks
1951	"Something Wonderful" b/w "Hello Young Lovers"	Lou Busch orchestra	–	–	–	Non-album tracks
1951	"When You and I Were Young, Maggie, Blues" b/w "Till We Meet Again" (Non-album track)	Jimmy Wakely	20	7	–	I'll Never Slip Around Again
1951	"Everlasting" b/w "The End Of A Love Affair"	Lou Busch orchestra	–	–	–	Non-album tracks
1951	"Good Morning, Mr. Echo" b/w "River Road Two-Step"	Lou Busch orchestra	14	–	–	Non-album tracks
1951	"I Don't Want To Be Free" b/w "Let's Live A Little" (Non-album track)	Jimmy Wakely	–	5	–	I'll Never Slip Around Again
1952	"I'll Walk Alone" b/w "I Could Write A Book"	Lou Busch orchestra	29	–	–	Non-album tracks
1952	"Outside Of Heaven" b/w "Alone Together"	Lou Busch orchestra	22	–	–	Non-album tracks
1953	"Try Me One More Time" b/w "Foggy River"		–	–	–	Non-album tracks
1953	"Why Don't You Believe Me?" b/w "Come Back To Me, Johnny"	Lou Busch orchestra	29	–	–	Non-album tracks
1953	"Singing Bells" b/w "Take Care, My Love"	Lou Busch orchestra	–	–	–	Non-album tracks
1953	"Gomen-Nasai" b/w "I Learned To Love You Too Later" (from I'll Never Slip Around Again)	Jimmy Wakely	–	–	–	Non-album tracks
1953	"Something Wonderful Happens" b/w "Where Did He Go"		–	–	–	Non-album tracks
1953	"The Night Holds No Fear (For The Lover)" b/w "I Just Love You"		–	–	–	Non-album tracks
1953	"There's A Silver Moon On The Golden Gate" b/w "The Tennessee Church Bells"	Jimmy Wakely	–	–	–	Non-album tracks
1954	"Moonlight In Vermont" new version	Lou Busch orchestra	29	–	–	Non-album tracks
1954	"Joey" b/w "Ask Me"	Nelson Riddle orchestra	–	–	–	Non-album tracks
1954	"An Affair Of The Heart" b/w "How Long Has It Been"	Nelson Riddle orchestra	–	–	–	Non-album tracks
1954	"All I Want Is All There Is and Then Some" b/w "Can This Be Love"	Nelson Riddle orchestra	–	–	–	Non-album tracks
1954	"My Own True Love" b/w "My Son, My Son"	Nelson Riddle orchestra	–	–	–	Non-album tracks
1954	"It's Nice To Have You Here" b/w "I Speak to the Stars"	Nelson Riddle orchestra	–	–	–	Non-album tracks
1955	"Allah Be Prais'd" b/w "Stowaway"	–	–	–		Non-album tracks
1955	"A Man" b/w "Mama's Pearls"	David Cavanaugh orchestra	–	–	–	Non-album tracks
1955	"Lover Lover (Never Leave Me)" b/w "A Kiss You A Million Times"	Frank De Vol	–	–	–	Non-album tracks
1956	"Old Enough" b/w "Second Time In Love"	Frank De Vol	–	–	–	Non-album tracks
1956	"True Love" b/w "Haunting Love"	A: Buddy Bregman; B: Frank De Vol	–	–	–	Non-album tracks
1956	"The Money Tree" b/w "Maybe I Love Him"	Billy May orchestra	20	–	–	
1957	"Speak For Yourself John" b/w "Kill Me With Kisses"	Billy Vaughn orchestra	–	–	–	Just A Dream
1957	"I Can't Help It (If I'm Still in Love with You)" b/w "That's Why I Was Born" (Non-album track)	A: Billy Vaughan; B: Milton Rogers	74	–	–	Margaret
1957	"Silver Bells" b/w "Christmas Candy"	Jimmy Wakely	–	–	–	Non-album tracks
1958	"I'm So Lonesome I Could Cry" b/w "Hot Spell" (from Just A Dream)	–	–	–	–	Margaret
1958	"Just A Dream" b/w "Pretty-Eyed Baby"	–	–	–	–	Just A Dream
1958	"I Love You Because" b/w "The Waiting Game" (from Just A Dream)	–	–	–	–	Margaret
1959	"I'm Alone Because I Love You" b/w "Top Of The Moon"	–	–	–	–	Just A Dream
1959	"Half As Much" b/w "My Ideal"	–	–	–	–	Non-album tracks
1960	"Why Was I Born" b/w "You Couldn't Be Cuter"	–	–	–	–	Margaret Whiting Sings The Jerome Kern Songbook
1961	"What's New At The Zoo" b/w "Hey, Look Me Over"	Mel Torme	–	–	–	Broadway, Right Now!
1961	"On Second Thought" b/w "Who Can? You Can!"	–	–	–	–	Non-album tracks
1966	"Somewhere There's Love" b/w "If This Is Goodbye" (from Maggie Isn't Margaret Anymore)	–	–	–	29	The Wheel Of Hurt
1966	"The Wheel Of Hurt" b/w "Nothing Lasts Forever"	Arnold Goland orchestra	26	–	1	The Wheel Of Hurt
1967	"Just Like A Man" b/w "The World Inside Your Arms" (from The Wheel Of Hurt)	–	132	–	29	Maggie Isn't Margaret Anymore
1967	"Only Love Can Break A Heart" b/w "Where Do I Stand" (from The Wheel Of Hurt)	Arnold Goland orchestra	96	–	4	Maggie Isn't Margaret Anymore
1967	"I Almost Called Your Name" b/w "Let's Pretend" (Non-album track)	–	108	–	4	Pop Country
1968	"I Hate To See Me Go" /	–	127	–	27	Pop Country
1968	"It Keeps Right On a-Hurtin'"	–	115	–	28	Pop Country
1968	"Faithfully" b/w "Am I Losing You" (from Pop Country)	–	117	–	19	Non-album tracks
1968	"Can't Get You Out Of My Mind" b/w "Maybe Just One More"	–	124	–	11	Non-album tracks
1969	"Where Was I" b/w "Love's The Only Answer"	–	–	–	24	Non-album tracks
1969	"At The Edge Of The Ocean" b/w "Love Has A Way"	–	–	–	–	Non-album tracks
1970	"(Z Theme) Life Goes On" b/w "By Now"	–	–	–	14	Non-album tracks
1970	"Until It's Time For You To Go" b/w "I'll Tell Him Today"	–	–	–	32	Non-album tracks

== Sources ==
- Margaret Whiting at IMDb
- Pop ranking from Joel Whitburn's Pop Memories 1890–1954, published in 1986 by Record Research Inc., Menomonee Falls, Wisconsin.
- Contributing artists from booklet with the "My Ideal" four CD set by Jasmine Records in 2007; confirmed by Time-Life Music tape set "Late 40s" released in 1991, and by Joel Whitburn's Pop Memories 1890–1954. Some Internet sources give Tex Beneke's orchestra as accompanying Whiting's hit, "A Wonderful Guy", but Beneke claimed Claire Chatwin was the singer on his version: see his album, "Here's To The Ladies Who Sang With The Band" – the latter can also be found here
