= The Intimate Bach, Duets with the Spanish Guitar Vol.2 =

Studio album by Laurindo Almeida
- Released: 1962
- Genre: Classical
- Label: Capitol Records

Duets with the Spanish Guitar, Vol. 2 is an album by the Brazilian guitarist Laurindo Almeida, with violist Virginia Majewski and French Horn player Vincent DeRosa. It was originally released by Capitol Records in 1962 with the title The Intimate Bach.

The album received a Grammy Nomination for Best Classical Performance - Chamber Music (1962).

In his review of the record, music critic Alfred Frankenstein specifically praises the horn playing of Vincent DeRosa, writing, "This is the most astonishing example of virtuosity on the horn I have ever heard on records...To play as lightly and speedily as a harpsichord, right out in the open with a minimum of support, is to give an incredible performance."

== Track listing ==
No.	Title	Music	Length
1.	"Komm süsser Tod (with viola)"	J S Bach
2.	"Fuga, from Sonata no. 3 in C for unaccompanied violin (guitar solo)"	J S Bach
3.	"Sarabande and Double, from Partita no. 1 in B minor for unaccompanied violin (with viola)"	J S Bach
4.	"Bourrée and Double, from Partita no. 1 in B minor for unaccompanied violin (with viola)"	J S Bach
5.	"Jesu, Joy of Man's Desiring (with viola)"	J S Bach
6.	"Partita in B flat for harpsichord (with horn) - Prelude, Allemande, Courante, Sarabande, Menuett I, Menuett II, Gigue"	J S Bach

== Personnel ==
- Laurindo Almeida - guitar
- Virginia Majewski - viola
- Vincent DeRosa - French horn
