= Mel Tormé and the Marty Paich Dek-Tette =

Mel Tormé with the Marty Paich Dek-Tette

Studio album by Mel Tormé and the Marty Paich Dek-Tette
- Released: 1956
- Recorded: January 20, 1956
- Genre: Vocal jazz
- Length: 33:15
- Label: Bethlehem

Mel Tormé and the Marty Paich Dek-Tette chronology
It's a Blue World (1955)	Mel Tormé with the Marty Paich Dek-Tette (1956)	Mel Tormé Sings Fred Astaire (1957)

Professional ratings
Review scores
Source	Rating
Allmusic	5/5 stars

Mel Tormé with the Marty Paich Dek-Tette is a 1956 album by Mel Tormé, with Marty Paich and his Dek-Tette.

== Track listing ==
1. "Lulu's Back in Town" (Al Dubin, Harry Warren) – 3:06
2. "When the Sun Comes Out" (Harold Arlen, Ted Koehler) – 3:20
3. "I Love to Watch the Moonlight" (Josef Myrow, Bickley Reichmer) – 2:53
4. "Fascinating Rhythm" (George Gershwin, Ira Gershwin) – 2:30
5. "The Blues" (Duke Ellington) – 3:34
6. "Carioca" (Edward Eliscu, Gus Kahn, Vincent Youmans) – 3:18
7. "The Lady Is a Tramp" (Lorenz Hart, Richard Rodgers) – 2:54
8. "I Like to Recognize the Tune" (Hart, Rodgers) – 3:16
9. "Keeping Myself for You" (Sidney Clare, Vincent Youmans) – 3:44
10. "Lullaby of Birdland" (George Shearing, George David Weiss) – 4:54
11. "When April Comes Again" (Jerry Livingston, Doris Schaefer, Randy Weston) – 2:59
12. "Sing for Your Supper" (Hart, Rodgers) – 2:23

== Personnel ==
- Mel Tormé - vocals
- Marty Paich - arranger, conductor
- Pete Candoli - trumpet
- Don Fagerquist - trumpet
- Bob Enevoldsen - trombone
- Bud Shank - alto sax
- Bob Cooper - tenor sax
- Jack DuLong - baritone sax
- Vince DeRosa - French horn
- Albert Pollan - tuba
- Red Mitchell - bass
- Mel Lewis - drums
- Jack Montrose - tenor sax
- John Cave - French horn
