= Julia Bal de Zuniga =

Belgian-born concert pianist and music educator

- Julia Bal de Zuniga, from a 1933 publication.
- Born: 1892; Ghent, Belgium
- Died: 1964; California
- Occupation(s): Pianist, music educator

Julia Bal de Zuniga (1892–1964) was a Belgian-born concert pianist and music educator in Los Angeles.

== Early life ==
Julia H. Bal was born in Ghent, Belgium, the daughter of musicians Herman J. Bal and Josephine Marie Bal. Her father was head of the piano department at the Royal Conservatory of Ghent, and later headed the music department at Baylor College for Women, now the University of Mary Hardin-Baylor, from 1902 to 1908.

She studied piano with Arthur De Greef in Brussels, Élie-Miriam Delaborde in Paris, and Emil Sauer in Berlin. She also studied with Isidor Philipp and Gabriel Fauré. At age 16 she played a two-piano concerto with Camille Saint-Saëns.

== Career ==
Julia Bal de Zuniga was a concert pianist based on the Pacific Coast of the United States. In 1911, she performed at the Franz Liszt centennial celebration in Mexico City. She toured in South America in 1917 and 1918. In 1928 she was featured in summer concerts at the University of California, Los Angeles.

Zuniga co-chaired the piano department at the Los Angeles Conservatory of Music, which would later be merged into California Institute of the Arts after her death. During her tenure at LACM, one of her students was American pianist and composer Marty Paich.

== Personal life ==
Julia Bal married Mexican-born Miguel A. Zuniga (also known by Michel or Michael), who worked at the Belgian consulate in Los Angeles. They had two children, Yvonne and Miguel Jr. She died in 1964, in her early seventies; her grave is in Glendale. There is a Julia Bal de Zuniga Scholarship Fund at the California Institute of the Arts.
