= Bellavia =

Bellavia is a surname. Notable people with the surname include:

- David Bellavia (born 1975), American veteran and politician
- Diego Alfredo Molero Bellavia, Venezuelan public official
- Lucien Bellavia (1960-2025), French footballer
- Marcantonio Bellavia (fl. 1670), Sicilian painter and etcher
- Michael Bellavia, American digital marketing executive
- Timothy D. Bellavia (born 1971), American children's author, illustrator and educator

Notable people with Bellavia as their first name:

- Bell Ribeiro-Addy (born 1985), British politician
