= Ella and Louis Again =

1957 album by Ella Fitzgerald and Louis Armstrong

Studio album by Ella Fitzgerald, Louis Armstrong
- Released: October 1957
- Recorded: July 23, July 31 and August 13, 1957
- Studio: Capitol (Hollywood); Radio Recorders (Hollywood)
- Genre: Jazz
- Length: 90:26
- Label: Verve MGV 4006-2; Verve 0602517036918 (2006)
- Producer: Norman Granz

Ella Fitzgerald chronology
Ella Fitzgerald Sings the Rodgers & Hart Songbook (1956)	Ella and Louis Again (1957)	Ella Fitzgerald Sings the Duke Ellington Songbook (1957)

Louis Armstrong chronology
Louis Under the Stars (1957)	Ella and Louis Again (1957)	Porgy and Bess (1959)

Ella and Louis Again is a studio album by Ella Fitzgerald and Louis Armstrong, released in 1957 on Verve Records. It is the sequel to their 1956 album, Ella and Louis. In contrast to their previous collaboration, this album features seven solo vocal tracks by either Armstrong or Fitzgerald amongst its dozen duet tracks. It was reissued as part of a two-compact disc set in 1995, and in The Complete Ella Fitzgerald & Louis Armstrong on Verve in 1997. It was recorded at Radio Recorders and Capitol Studios, Hollywood.

== Reception ==
Professional ratings
Review scores
Source	Rating
AllMusic	4/5 stars
The Encyclopedia of Popular Music	4/5 stars
The Penguin Guide to Jazz Recordings	3.5/4 stars

In addition to the album not being strictly all vocal duets, whereas on its predecessor Armstrong plays trumpet on every track, here he only plays on six. The Oscar Peterson Trio returns as the duo's backing, this time along with drummer Louie Bellson. Writing for AllMusic, music critic Alex Henderson wrote of the album:

One could nit-pick about the fact that Satchmo doesn't take more trumpet solos, but the artists have such a strong rapport as vocalists that the trumpet shortage is only a minor point. Seven selections find either Fitzgerald or Armstrong singing without the other, although they're together more often than not on this fine recording.

== Track listing ==
=== Side one ===
No.	Title	Writer(s)	Length
1.	"Don't Be That Way"	Benny Goodman, Edgar Sampson, Mitchell Parish	4:59
2.	"Makin' Whoopee" (Armstrong solo vocal)	Walter Donaldson, Gus Kahn	3:56
3.	"They All Laughed"	Ira Gershwin, George Gershwin	3:46
4.	"Comes Love" (Fitzgerald solo vocal)	Lew Brown, Sam Stept, Charles Tobias	2:25
5.	"Autumn in New York"	Vernon Duke	5:57

=== Side two ===
No.	Title	Writer(s)	Length
1.	"Let's Do It" (Armstrong solo vocal)	Cole Porter	8:41
2.	"Stompin' at the Savoy"	Benny Goodman, Edgar Sampson, Chick Webb, Andy Razaf	5:12
3.	"I Won't Dance"	Jerome Kern, Oscar Hammerstein II, Otto Harbach, Dorothy Fields	4:43
4.	"Gee, Baby, Ain't I Good to You"	Don Redman, Andy Razaf	4:12

=== Side three ===
No.	Title	Writer(s)	Length
1.	"Let's Call the Whole Thing Off"	George Gershwin, Ira Gerswhin	4:11
2.	"These Foolish Things" (Fitzgerald solo vocal)	Harry Link, Holt Marvell, Jack Strachey	7:36
3.	"I've Got My Love to Keep Me Warm"	Irving Berlin	3:09
4.	"Willow Weep for Me" (Armstrong solo vocal)	Ann Ronell	4:18
5.	"I'm Putting All My Eggs in One Basket"	Irving Berlin	3:26

=== Side four ===
No.	Title	Writer(s)	Length
1.	"A Fine Romance"	Dorothy Fields, Jerome Kern	3:52
2.	"Ill Wind" (Fitzgerald solo vocal)	Harold Arlen, Ted Koehler	3:41
3.	"Love Is Here to Stay"	Ira Gershwin, George Gershwin	3:58
4.	"I Get a Kick out of You" (Armstrong solo vocal)	Cole Porter	4:17
5.	"Learnin' the Blues"	Dolores Silver	7:11

== CD editions ==
In 1995 and 2003, a double CD was released with the same content as the double LP, but in 2000, a single CD was released with only the 12 duets, removing the 7 songs with either Armstrong or Fitzgerald solo vocal:

No.	Title	Writer(s)	Length
1.	"Don't Be That Way"	Benny Goodman, Edgar Sampson, Mitchell Parish	4:59
2.	"They All Laughed"	Ira Gershwin, George Gershwin	3:46
3.	"Autumn in New York"	Vernon Duke	5:57
4.	"Stompin' at the Savoy"	Benny Goodman, Edgar Sampson, Chick Webb, Andy Razaf	5:12
5.	"I Won't Dance"	Jerome Kern, Oscar Hammerstein II, Otto Harbach, Dorothy Fields	4:43
6.	"Gee, Baby, Ain't I Good to You"	Don Redman, Andy Razaf	4:12
7.	"Let's Call the Whole Thing Off"	George Gershwin, Ira Gerswhin	4:11
8.	"I've Got My Love to Keep Me Warm"	Irving Berlin	3:09
9.	"I'm Putting All My Eggs in One Basket"	Irving Berlin	3:26
10.	"A Fine Romance"	Dorothy Fields, Jerome Kern	3:52
11.	"Love Is Here to Stay"	Ira Gershwin, George Gershwin	3:58
12.	"Learnin' the Blues"	Dolores Silver	7:11

== Personnel ==
- Louis Armstrong – vocals; trumpet on "Autumn in New York," "Stompin' at the Savoy," "Gee Baby Ain't I Good to You," "Willow Weep for Me," "Love Is Here to Stay," and "Learnin' the Blues."
- Ella Fitzgerald – vocals
- Oscar Peterson – piano
- Herb Ellis – guitar
- Ray Brown – bass
- Louie Bellson – drums

== Charts ==
Chart performance for Ella & Louis Again
Chart (2022)	Peak position
German Albums (Offizielle Top 100)	84
