= Laurie Allyn =

American jazz singer and former model

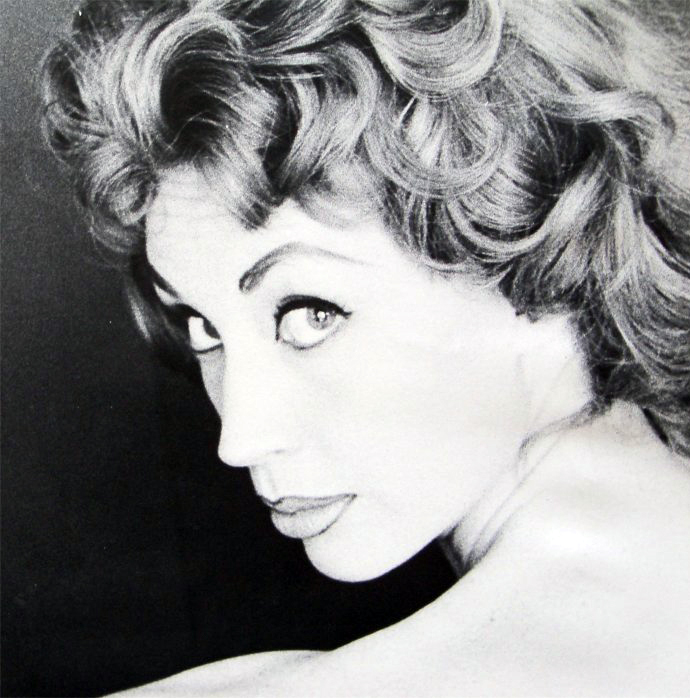
- Publicity photo of Laurie Allyn, c. 1957

Background information
- Origin: United States
- Genre: Vocal jazz
- Occupations: Singer, model
- Years active: 1953–1957, 2004–2022
- Labels: Mode, VSOP

Laurie Allyn was an American jazz singer and former model. She is best known for her sole album Paradise, which was recorded in 1957 and amassed critical acclaim after a belated release in 2004.

== Early life and career ==
Allyn was born into a musical family and raised in Waco, Texas. Upon coming of age in the mid-1950s, Allyn began to pursue a career as a singer, initially performing with local groups in the Waco area. She soon relocated to the St. Louis, Missouri area. While performing at events near Scott Air Force Base, Allyn auditioned for songwriter Tommy Wolf and began performing as house singer at the nightclub The Crystal Palace, owned by Fran Landesman, with Wolf accompanying Allyn on piano. Allyn was the first singer to perform Landesman and Wolf's song "Spring Can Really Hang You Up the Most" in public; the song would later become a standard recorded by many artists.

In 1954, Allyn was hired and brought to Chicago to work as house singer at the nightclub The Cloister Inn. While working at the Cloister Inn, she met singer Tony Bennett for a breakfast date, and discussed her then-accompanist, Ralph Sharon, with him. The conversation led Bennett to hire the pianist away from her. Ralph Sharon would go on to perform with Bennett for over forty years.

By 1956, Allyn had retired from performing, and had married Bill Doherty, part owner of the nightclub The Black Orchid. In 1957, Allyn was performing again at the nightclub The Nocturne, where the Chicago Tribune reported on the popularity of her "throaty, seated-on-a-piano, moody Julie London-ish" live performances.

== Mode Records album ==
=== Recording ===
Red Clyde, founder of Mode Records, heard Allyn sing at The Nocturne in 1957 and invited her to Los Angeles to record an album with the label. She visited Los Angeles to record the album at Radio Recorders in early October 1957. The recording engineer was Bones Howe, and the players included conductor Marty Paich, guitarist Al Viola, bassist Red Mitchell, drummer Mel Lewis, trumpeter Don Fagerquist, and the members of the Hollywood String Quartet. Mode planned to bring Allyn back to Los Angeles after the album's release, when she was scheduled to perform on The Steve Allen Show and audition for a television show at NBC.

However, a short time after the recording of the album, Mode Records went into receivership because the company was overextended financially and was unable to meet financial obligations to the recording studio and musicians. The album was not released. After the recording of the album, Allyn returned to Texas to care for her ailing mother and then went back to Chicago to work as a model. But she did not pursue singing further.

=== Release by VSOP ===
In 2004, Allyn began researching the whereabouts of the masters of her album, which by then were owned by the archive label VSOP Records and were being considered for release. Half of the masters survived, but the remaining tracks were salvaged from a dub of the masters. Bones Howe, the engineer of Allyn's session, mastered the album for release. The album was released as Paradise by VSOP Records that year.

At AllMusic, Scott Yanow gave the album four and a half out of five stars, stating, "her choice of notes is excellent and she draws listeners into the music."

Paul Clatworthy described the album as "captivating" in the Robert Farnon Society's Journal Into Melody, adding, "Laurie's bell-like diction fits the songs so well they could have all been written just for her." The album was submitted for consideration for a Grammy Award.

Paradise was reissued in 2007 for Japan by the record label Muzak and received favorable reviews in the magazines Swing Journal and Jazz Life. The Muzak edition of the album was utilized by author Wojciech Pacuła to test high fidelity equipment in the Polish magazine High Fidelity and in the hi-fi website 6moons.com.

== Personal life ==
According to her daughter Carrie Pierce, Laurie Allyn died on February 11, 2022.

== Discography ==
- Paradise (VSOP, 2004)
