= Mel Tormé Sings Fred Astaire =

Studio album by Mel Tormé
- Released: 1956
- Recorded: November 10–11, 1956
- Genre: Vocal jazz
- Length: 33:15
- Label: Bethlehem

Mel Tormé chronology
Mel Tormé and the Marty Paich Dek-Tette (1956)	Mel Tormé Sings Fred Astaire (1956)	Mel Tormé at the Crescendo (1957)

Professional ratings
Review scores
Source	Rating
Allmusic	5/5 stars

Mel Tormé Sings Fred Astaire is a 1956 album by Mel Tormé, recorded in tribute to Fred Astaire. This was Tormé's second recording with Marty Paich and his Dek-Tette.

== Track listing ==
1. "Nice Work If You Can Get It" (George Gershwin, Ira Gershwin) – 3:12
2. "Something's Gotta Give" (Johnny Mercer) – 4:00
3. "A Foggy Day" (G. Gershwin, I. Gershwin) – 2:47
4. "A Fine Romance" (Dorothy Fields, Jerome Kern) – 3:04
5. "Let's Call the Whole Thing Off" (G. Gershwin, I. Gershwin) – 3:29
6. "Top Hat, White Tie and Tails" (Berlin) – 3:11
7. "The Way You Look Tonight" (Fields, Kern) – 2:25
8. "The Piccolino" (Berlin) – 2:38
9. "They Can't Take That Away from Me" (G. Gershwin, I. Gershwin) – 3:04
10. "Cheek to Cheek" (Berlin) – 3:01
11. "Let's Face the Music and Dance" (Berlin) – 2:22
12. "They All Laughed" (G. Gershwin, I. Gershwin) – 2:30

== Personnel ==
- Mel Tormé - vocals
- Marty Paich - arranger, conductor
- Herb Geller - alto saxophone
- Jack Montrose - tenor saxophone
- Jack DuLong - baritone saxophone
- Pete Candoli - trumpet
- Don Fagerquist - trumpet
- Bob Enevoldsen - valve trombone and tenor
- Vince DeRosa - French horn
- Albert Pollan - tuba
- Max Bennett - bass
- Alvin Stoller - drums
