= Swingin' on the Moon =

Studio album by Mel Tormé
- Released: 1960
- Recorded: August 3–5, 1960
- Genre: Vocal jazz
- Length: 38:12
- Label: Verve (MG VS-62144)
- Producer: Russell Garcia

Mel Tormé chronology
Mel Tormé Swings Shubert Alley (1960)	Swingin' on the Moon (1960)	Broadway, Right Now! (1960)

Professional ratings
Review scores
Source	Rating
AllMusic	3/5 stars
DownBeat	2.5/5 stars
The Penguin Guide to Jazz Recordings	3.5/4 stars

Swingin' on the Moon is a 1960 album by Mel Tormé. The Moon is the connecting theme, and every track, but one, contains the word "Moon" in the title.

== Track listing ==
1. "Swingin' on the Moon" (Mel Tormé) – 3:32
2. "Moonlight Cocktail" (Kim Gannon, Luckey Roberts) – 3:04
3. "I Wished on the Moon" (Dorothy Parker, Ralph Rainger) – 3:56
4. "Moon Song" (Sam Coslow, Arthur Johnston) – 3:16
5. "How High the Moon" (Nancy Hamilton, Morgan Lewis) – 3:13
6. "Don't Let That Moon Get Away" (Johnny Burke, James V. Monaco) – 2:39
7. "Blue Moon" (Lorenz Hart, Richard Rodgers) – 3:46
8. "A Velvet Affair" (Fred Reynolds, Sid Ramin) – 3:00
9. "No Moon at All" (Redd Evans, Dave Mann) – 2:39
10. "Moonlight in Vermont" (John Blackburn, Karl Suessdorf) – 3:05
11. "Oh, You Crazy Moon" (Burke, Van Heusen) – 3:16
12. "The Moon Was Yellow" (Fred E. Ahlert, Edgar Leslie) – 2:46

== Personnel ==
- Mel Tormé - vocals
- Russell Garcia - arranger, conductor
