= Louis Under the Stars =

Studio album by Louis Armstrong
- Released: November 1958
- Recorded: August 14, 1957
- Studio: Capitol (Hollywood)
- Genre: Jazz
- Length: 45:44
- Label: Verve MGV 4012

Louis Armstrong chronology
| New Orleans Nights (1958) | Louis Under the Stars (1958) | Louis and the Angels (1958) |

Louis Under the Stars is a 1958 album by Louis Armstrong, arranged by Russell Garcia. The album was recorded on the same day as Armstrong's 1958 album I've Got the World on a String; the previous day he had finished recording Ella and Louis Again with Ella Fitzgerald.

== Reception ==
Professional ratings
Review scores
| Source | Rating |
|---|---|
| AllMusic | 4/5 stars |

Billboard magazine reviewed the album in their November 5, 1958, issue and wrote that "The great artist gives a brace of standards his wonderful and soulful, gravel-voiced treatment...The combination of talents puts this package in the top flight category".

Scott Yanow reviewed the album for AllMusic and wrote that "Although the accompaniment is pretty straight and unadventurous, it is enjoyable to hear Satch's interpretations of such songs as 'Have You Met Miss Jones,' 'I Only Have Eyes for You,' 'Home,' and 'East of the Sun.' Many of his trumpet solos in the medium-tempo material are brief but dramatic, and his singing is typically expressive and good-humored".

== Track listing ==
1. "Top Hat, White Tie and Tails" (Irving Berlin) – 4:14
2. "Have You Met Miss Jones?" (Richard Rodgers, Lorenz Hart) – 4:41
3. "I Only Have Eyes for You" (Al Dubin, Harry Warren) – 4:16
4. "Stormy Weather" (Harold Arlen) – 4:19
5. "Home (When Shadows Fall)" (Geoffrey Clarkson, Harry Clarkson, Peter van Steeden) – 5:52
6. "East of the Sun (and West of the Moon)" (Brooks Bowman) – 3:17
7. "You're Blase" (Ord Hamilton, Bruce Sievier) – 5:01
8. "Body and Soul" (Frank Eyton, Johnny Green) – 4:55

== Personnel ==
- Louis Armstrong – trumpet, vocals
- Russell Garcia – arranger, conductor
- Norman Granz – producer
