= Just Like a Man =

Song by Margaret Whiting
- Language: English
- Genre: Popular music
- Songwriter(s): Les Reed, Barry Mason

"Just Like a Man" is a song written by Les Reed and Barry Mason, and recorded by Margaret Whiting. With lyrics in Swedish by Patrice Hellberg, it was recorded in 1967 by Lill Lindfors, as "En så'n karl".

Anne-Lie Rydé recorded the song on her 1992 cover album, Stulna kyssar.

An Agnes Carlsson recording charted at Svensktoppen for eight weeks in 2013-2014.
