= ¡Olé Tormé! =

¡Olé Tormé!: Mel Tormé Goes South of the Border with Billy May

Studio album by Mel Tormé
- Released: 1959
- Recorded: March 21 – April 2, 1959, Los Angeles
- Genre: Vocal jazz
- Length: 54:31
- Label: Verve
- Producer: Carl Jefferson

Mel Tormé chronology
Mel Tormé's California Suite (1957)	¡Olé Tormé!: Mel Tormé Goes South of the Border with Billy May (1959)	Back in Town (1959)

Professional ratings
Review scores
Source	Rating
AllMusic	4/5 stars
DownBeat	2.5/5 stars
The Penguin Guide to Jazz Recordings	3/4 stars

¡Olé Tormé!: Mel Tormé Goes South of the Border with Billy May is a 1959 studio album by Mel Tormé, arranged by Billy May. It was one of many Latin-tinged jazz albums released in the late 1950s and early 1960s.

== Track listing ==
No.	Title	Writer(s)	Length
1.	"At the Crossroads (Malagueña)"	Ernesto Lecuona, Bob Russell	2:39
2.	"Frenesi"	Alberto Dominguez, Leonard Whitcup	2:36
3.	"Adios"	Enric Madriguera, Harry M. Woods	2:05
4.	"Baia"	Ary Barroso, Ray Gilbert	2:30
5.	"Six Lessons from Madame la Zonga"	James V. Monaco, Charles Newman	3:10
6.	"Rosita"	Gus Haenschen	2:58
7.	"South of the Border"	Michael Carr, Jimmy Kennedy	3:03
8.	"Nina"	Cole Porter	2:36
9.	"Cuban Love Song"	Dorothy Fields, Jimmy McHugh, Herbert Stothart	2:04
10.	"Perfidia"	Alberto Dominguez	2:08
11.	"The Rhumba Jumps!"	Hoagy Carmichael, Johnny Mercer	2:14
12.	"Vaya Con Dios (May God Be with You)"	Inez James, Buddy Pepper, Larry Russell	3:19

=== Personnel ===
- Mel Tormé – vocals, drums
- Frank Beach – trumpet
- Pete Candoli
- Conrad Gozzo
- Manny Klein
- Eddie Kusby – trombone
- Tommy Pederson
- Dave Wells
- Si Zentner
- Gene Cipriano – woodwind
- Chuck Gentry
- Justin Gordon
- Wilbur Schwartz
- Bud Shank
- Red Callender – tuba
- Verlye Mills – harp
- Jimmy Rowles – piano
- Al Pelligrini
- Bob Gibbons – guitar
- Ralph Peña – double bass
- Lou Singer – percussion, drums, marimba
- Alvin Stoller – drums
- Larry Bunker – drums, marimba
- Billy May – arranger, conductor
- Sheldon Marks – art direction
- William Rotsler – cover photo
