= Marty Paich =

American pianist, composer and conductor (1925–1995)

Background information
- Born: Martin Louis Paich; 23 January 1925; Oakland, California, U.S.
- Died: 12 August 1995 (aged 70) Santa Ynez, California, U.S.
- Genres: Jazz, pop, rock
- Occupations: Musician, arranger, composer, conductor, record producer
- Instrument: Piano
- Years active: 1954–1995
- Spouse: Huddy Hurst (m. 1948; died 1979)
- Website: martypaich.com (inactive)

Martin Louis Paich (January 23, 1925 – August 12, 1995) was an American pianist, composer, arranger, record producer, music director, and conductor. As a musician and arranger he worked with jazz musicians Peggy Lee, Ella Fitzgerald, Stan Kenton, Al Hirt, Art Pepper, Buddy Rich, Ray Brown, Shorty Rogers, Pete Rugolo, Ray Charles, Barbra Streisand, and Mel Tormé. His long association with Tormé included one of the singer's earliest albums, Mel Tormé with the Marty Paich Dek-Tette. Over the next three decades he worked with pop singers such as Andy Williams and Jack Jones and for film and television. He is the father of David Paich, a founding member of the rock band Toto.

== Career ==
A native of Oakland, California, Paich learned accordion and piano at an early age. In the 1930s, when he was ten years old, he was leading bands and performing at weddings. At sixteen, he wrote arrangements with Pete Rugolo. He served with the U.S. Air Corps in World War II. He attended the University of Southern California and received a master's degree in composition from the Los Angeles Conservatory of Music. Among his teachers were Julia Bal de Zuniga, Mario Castelnuovo-Tedesco, and Arnold Schoenberg.

In the 1950s, in addition to working as music director for Peggy Lee, he wrote arrangements for Chet Baker, Ray Brown, Stan Kenton, Shelly Manne, Dave Pell, Buddy Rich, Shorty Rogers, Mahalia Jackson, and for the movie Lady and the Tramp. He began recording with Mel Tormé in 1955 on the album It's a Blue World when Tormé was moving from pop singer to jazz singer. During the next year, his ten-piece band accompanied Tormé on the album Mel Tormé with the Marty Paich Dek-Tette, which contained a version of the 1930s song "Lulu's Back in Town". He wrote arrangements for Art Pepper for the album Art Pepper + Eleven – Modern Jazz Classics.

In the 1960s, he spent less time as a musician and more as an arranger for pop singers such as Sammy Davis Jr., Dean Martin, Johnny Rivers, Barbra Streisand, Andy Williams, Dinah Shore, and Jack Jones.

He also scored films, such as Hey There, It's Yogi Bear! (1964), The Man Called Flintstone (1966), The Swinger (1966) and Changes (1969).

In the 1970s, he worked as a composer and arranger in film and television, winning an Emmy award for the television drama Ironside. He led the studio orchestras for television variety programs such as The Glen Campbell Goodtime Hour and The Sonny & Cher Comedy Hour, and replaced Nelson Riddle on The Smothers Brothers Comedy Hour.

Marty orchestrated and conducted scores for the films The Fugitive, Pretty Woman, and Prince of Tides.

== Death ==
Paich died of colon cancer at the age of 70 on August 12, 1995 at his home in Santa Ynez, California.

== Awards and honors ==
- Emmy, Best Song or Theme, Ironside, 1974
- Songwriter of the Year, Singers' Salute to the Songwriter, 1991. [EJazzlines.com]

== Discography ==
=== As leader ===
- 1955.01 - Jazz Music For The Birds And The Hep Cats (Betlehem, 1955) [Russ Garcia And Marty Paich]
- 1955.11 - Tenors West (Gene Norman Presents,1956) [J Giuffre, B Cooper, H Klee, B Enevoldsen With The Marty Paich Octet]
- 1955.00 The Two previous recording were reissued as Paich ench (Fresh Sound Recs, 2006)
- 1956.08 - The Marty Paich Quartet Featuring Art Pepper (Tampa, 1956)
- 1956.08 - Hot Piano (Tampa, 1957) [Quartet] - Reissued as Jazz for Relaxation (Tampa, 1958)
- 1957.06 - Paich Is The Picasso of Big Band Jazz (Cadence, 1958) - Reissued as What's New (Discovery, 1982)
- 1957.06 - Marty Paich Trio (Mode, 1957)
- 1957.07 - A Jazz Band Ball, First Set (Mode, 1958) [Marty Paich Combo] - Reissued as Revel Without A Pause (Interlude, 1959)
- 1959.00 - The Broadway Bit (Warner Bros., 1959) [Orchestra]
- 1959.06 - I Get a Boot Out of You (Warner Bros., 1959) [Orchestra]
- 1959.10 - Take Me Along (RCA Victor, 1960) [Piano quartet]
- 1960.06 - Lush, Latin & Cool (RCA Victor, 1961) [Piano quartet]
- 1966 ? -The Rock Jazz Incident (Reprise, 1966) [Orchestra]

=== As arranger a/o sideman ===
With Dave Pell

- 1956.09 - Swingin' in the Ol' Corral (RCA Victor, 1957) [Octet]
- 1957.01 - A Pell of a Time (RCA Victor, 1957) [Octet]
- 1958.08 - Swingin' School Songs (Coral, 1958) [Octet]
- 1959.02 - The Big Small Bands (Capitol, 1960)
- 1960-61 - The Old South wails (Capitol, 1961) [Octet]
- 1961 - I remember John Kirby (Capitol, 1961) [Quintet]

With Johnny Rivers

- Realization (Imperial, 1968)
- Slim Slo Slider (Imperial, 1970)
- Outside Help (Soul City/Big Tree, 1977)

With Jack Jones

- I've Got a Lot of Livin' to Do! (Kapp, 1962)
- Wives and Lovers (Kapp, 1963)
- My Kind of Town (Kapp, 1965)
- Without Her (RCA Victor, 1967)
- If You Ever Leave Me (RCA Victor, 1968)

With Mel Tormé

- Mel Tormé and the Marty Paich Dek-Tette (Bethlehem, 1956)
- Mel Tormé Sings Fred Astaire (Bethlehem, 1956)
- At The Crescendo (Bethlehem, 1957)
- Dedicated to the Golden State: Mel Torme's California Suite (Bethlehem, 1957)
- Prelude To A Kiss (Tops, 1958) [Orchestra]
- Songs for Any Taste (Bethlehem, 1959) [Orchestra]
- 'Tormé' (Verve, 1959) [Orchestra]
- Back in Town (Verve, 1960) [with The Mel-Tones and Orchestra]
- Swings Shubert Alley (Verve, 1960) [Dek-Tette]
- Songs of Love (Hurrah, 1962) [Orchestra]
- Reunion (Concord Jazz, 1988) [Dek-Tette]
- Mel Tormé and the Marty Paich Dektette – In Concert Tokyo (Concord, 1989) [Dek-Tette]

With others

- 1959 - Joanie Sommers "Positively the Most!" Warner Bros.
- 1955. - Laurie Allyn, Paradise (Mode, 2004)
- Patti Austin, Patti Austin (Qwest, 1984)
- Jesse Belvin, Mr. Easy (RCA 1960)
- Stephen Bishop, Bish (ABC 1978)
- Joe Bushkin, Night Sounds San Francisco (Decca, 1966)
- Ray Charles, Modern Sounds in Country and Western Music (ABC-Paramount, 1962)
- Hank Crawford, Soul of the Ballad (Atlantic, 1963)
- Sammy Davis Jr., The Wham of Sam, (Reprise, 1961)
- Sammy Davis Jr., What Kind of Fool Am I and Other Show-Stoppers, (Reprise, 1961)
- Sammy Davis Jr., Sammy Davis Jr. Belts the Best of Broadway, (Reprise, 1962)
- Neil Diamond, Tap Root Manuscript (UNI, 1970)
- Bob Enevoldsen, Bob Enevoldsen Quintet (Tampa, 1956)
- Bob Enevoldsen, Smorgasbord (Liberty, 1956)
- Don Fagerquist, Music to Fill a Void Eight by Eight (Mode, 1957)
- Jerry Fielding, Swingin' in Hi-Fi (Decca, 1956)
- Herbie Fields, Blow Hot Blow Cool (Decca, 1955)
- Ella Fitzgerald, Ella Swings Lightly (Verve, 1958)
- Ella Fitzgerald, Whisper Not (Verve, 1966)
- Ella Fitzgerald, Sunshine of Your Love (MPS, 1969)
- Connie Francis, A New Kind of Connie... (MGM, 1964)
- Russell Garcia, Four Horns and a Lush Life (Bethlehem, 1956)
- 1955. - Russell Garcia, Russel Garcia and His Four Trombone Band (Fresh Sound, 2005)
- Herb Geller, Milt Bernhart, Howard Roberts, Curtis Counce, Jazz Studio 2 from Hollywood (Decca, 1954)
- Jimmy Giuffre, Bob Cooper, Harry Klee, Bob Enevoldsen, Tenors West (GNP, 1956)
- Herbie Harper, Herbie Harper Sextet! (Mode, 1957)
- Toni Harper, Lady Lonely (RCA Victor, 1959)
- Toni Harper, Night Mood (RCA Victor, 1960)
- The Hi-Lo's, And All That Jazz (Columbia, 1958)
- Al Hirt, Our Man In New Orleans, (RCA Victor, 1963)
- Al Hirt, Trumpet and Strings (RCA Victor, 1964)
- Lena Horne, Lena...Lovely and Alive (RCA Victor, 1962)
- Lena Horne, Lena Sings Your Requests (CRC, 1963)
- Helen Humes, Songs I Like to Sing! (Contemporary, 1960 [1961])
- Mahalia Jackson, Christmas with Mahalia (Columbia)
- Elton John, The Fox (Geffen, 1981)
- Anita Kerr, Mellow Moods of Love (RCA 1965)
- Ronnie Lang, Modern Jazz (Tops, 1957)
- Mel Lewis, Mel Lewis Sextet (Mode, 1957)
- Abbey Lincoln, Affair...A Story of a Girl in Love (Liberty, 1957)
- Cheryl Lynn, Cheryl Lynn (Columbia, 1978)
- Gloria Lynne, Gloria, Marty & Strings (Everest, 1963)
- Shelly Manne, The West Coast Sound (Contemporary, 1956)
- Gene McDaniels, Sometimes I'm Happy Sometimes I'm Sad (Liberty, 1960)
- Randy Meisner, Randy Meisner (Asylum, 1978)
- Ann-Margret, And Here She Is...Ann-Margret (RCA Victor, 1961)
- Ann-Margret, Songs from the Swinger and Other Swingin' Songs (RCA Victor, 1966)
- Audrey Morris, The Voice of Audrey Morris (Bethlehem, 1956)
- Anita O'Day, Anita Sings the Winners (Verve, 1958)
- Art Pepper, Chile Pepper (Charlie Parker, 1956)
- Art Pepper, Art Pepper + Eleven – Modern Jazz Classics (Contemporary, 1959)
- Lucy Ann Polk, Lucky Lucy Ann (Mode, 1957)
- Johnny Richards, Something Else by Johnny Richards (Bethlehem, 1956)
- Mavis Rivers, Mavis (Reprise, 1961)
- Howard Roberts, Mr. Roberts Plays Guitar (Verve, 1957)
- Shorty Rogers, Shorty Rogers Courts the Count (RCA Victor, 1954)
- Shorty Rogers, The Big Shorty Rogers Express (RCA Victor, 1956)
- Linda Ronstadt Cry Like a Rainstorm, Howl Like the Wind (Elektra, 1989)
- Jack Sheldon, A Jazz Profile of Ray Charles (Reprise, 1961)
- Eddie Shu, Jazz Practitioners (Bethlehem, 1957)
- Sarah Vaughan, Songs of the Beatles (Atlantic, 1981)
- Sarah Vaughan, Gershwin Live! (Columbia, 1982)
- Leon Ware, Leon Ware (Elektra, 1982)
- Fran Warren, Hey There! Here's Fran Warren (Tops, 1957)
- Fran Warren, Come Rain or Come Shine (Venise, 1959)

== See also ==
- List of jazz arrangers
- Category:Albums arranged by Marty Paich
