= Lulu's Back in Town =

1935 song by Al Dubin and Harry Warren

"Lulu's Back in Town" is a popular song and jazz standard written in 1935 by Al Dubin (words) and Harry Warren (music).

== First performances ==
"Lulu's Back in Town" was performed in the 1935 film Broadway Gondolier, directed by Lloyd Bacon, where it was sung by Dick Powell and The Mills Brothers. The arrangement was by George Roumanis. It was also used as the title song of the Warner Brothers animated short Buddy the Gee Man.

== Lyrics ==
The chorus runs

Gotta get my old tuxedo pressed,
Gotta sew a button on my vest,
'Cause tonight I've gotta look my best,
Lulu's back in town.

One line has a reference to Cole Porter:

You can tell all my pets, all my Harlem coquettes,
Mister Otis regrets, that he won't be aroun'

This refers to the macabre Porter song "Miss Otis Regrets".

== Other recordings and performances ==
"Lulu's Back in Town" was popularized by Fats Waller in his recording of 8 May 1935 for Victor Records which made the US charts. Others who recorded it include Dick Powell, Mel Tormé, Mills Brothers, Wingy Manone, Chick Bullock, Bob Howard, Teddy Hill, Bert Ambrose, Ted Fiorito, Thelonious Monk, Art Tatum, Oscar Peterson, Booker T. & the M.G.'s, The Four Freshmen, and Leon Redbone.

In the 1969–70 premiere season of Sesame Street, the song was performed by a pair of Muppets: "Lulu" was an aggressive monster with red-ribboned black hair, and the lead singer was a mild-mannered mustached man in a tuxedo who was simultaneously fascinated and frightened by Lulu.

Redd Foxx and Timmie Rogers performed the song on Sanford and Son in the episode "Brother, Can You Spare an Act?".

Rachel York, as the character of Circe, sang a cover of "Lulu's Back In Town" in the Justice League Unlimited episode "This Little Piggy".

The 2008 film Be Kind Rewind uses the version done by Booker T. and the M.G.'s.
