= Russell Garcia (composer) =

American composer and arranger (1916–2011)

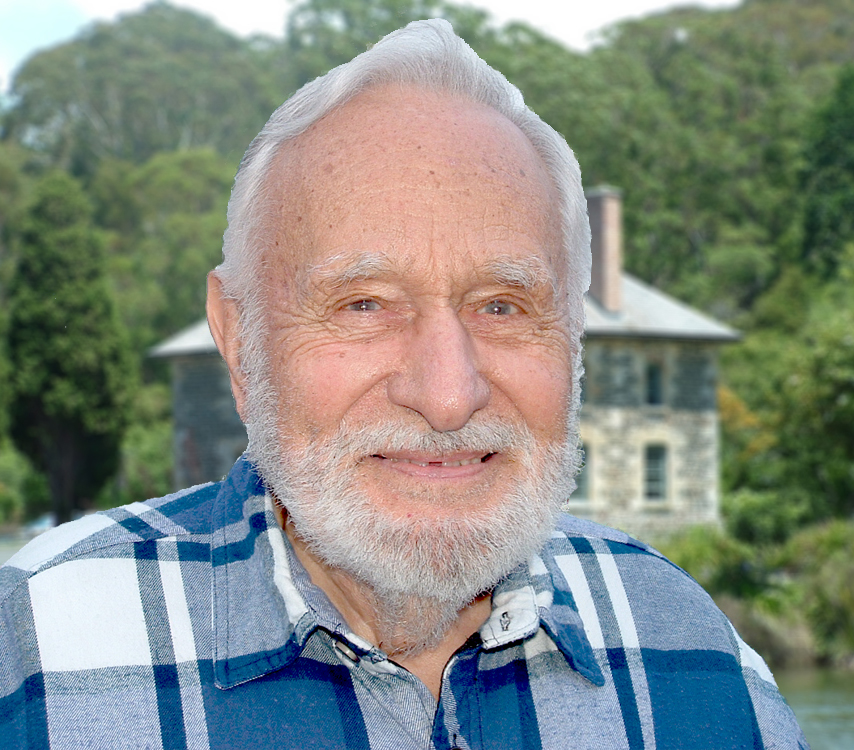
- Garcia at Kerikeri
- Born: April 12, 1916; Oakland, California, U.S.
- Died: November 19, 2011 (aged 95); Bay of Islands, New Zealand
- Education: San Francisco State College
- Occupation: composer
- Spouse: Gina Mauriello Garcia (m. 1951; died 2011)
- Children: 2

Russell Garcia, QSM (12 April 1916 – 19 November 2011) was an American composer and arranger who wrote a wide variety of music for screen, stage and broadcast.

Garcia was born in Oakland, California, but was a longtime resident of New Zealand. Self-taught, his break came when he substituted for an ill colleague on a radio show. Subsequently, he went on to become a composer/arranger at NBC Studios for such television shows as Rawhide 1962 and Laredo, 1965–67. He worked at Universal Studios and MGM, where at the latter he composed and conducted the original scores for such films as George Pal's The Time Machine (1960) and Atlantis, the Lost Continent (1961). He also orchestrated the music for Father Goose (1964) and The Benny Goodman Story (1956). Garcia collaborated with many Hollywood musicians and celebrities, including Ella Fitzgerald, Louis Armstrong, Anita O'Day, Mel Torme, Julie London, Oscar Peterson, Stan Kenton, Maynard Ferguson, Walt Disney, Orson Welles, Jane Wyman, Ronald Reagan, Andy Williams, Judy Garland, Henry Mancini, and Charlie Chaplin making arrangements and conducting orchestras as needed. Russ loved to ski so he would write on-site scores to ski-content films.

== Personal life ==
One of five brothers, Garcia grew up in what he said was an "ordinary" household where music was something that came out of the radio. When his family noticed the five-year-old Russ standing by the radio every Sunday morning waiting for the New York Philharmonic to come on, it was obvious the child had a special interest in music. One of his brothers presented him with an old cornet he bought for $5, which Russ taught himself to play. In school he started a jazz band to play his new horn, and ended up using the band as an outlet for his compositions and arrangements of standards, all of which were self-taught. "I've been able to read music since I was little," he said at the time. "I don't know how, because I had lessons only when I went to high school. Call it instinct, call it a gift, I've never questioned my musical ability. I'm thankful for it. If I take up a sheet of manuscript paper and a pen there's a whole orchestra playing in my head. At times I can't write quickly enough to keep up with what's flowing out of me."

Garcia and his wife Gina Mauriello Garcia, a published author and singer-lyricist-writer in her own right, were members of the Baháʼí Faith since 1955. In 1966, at the height of his career, the Garcias sold their home and possessions, bought a boat, and set sail on June 1. However, the couple knew nothing about sailing and Gina did not know how to swim; the early arrival of Hurricane Alma forced them to return after only two days at sea. It was December before damage to the boat was finally repaired and they set forth once again. This time they reached Nassau without further complications and spent several years as "travel-teachers" for the Baháʼís as they went around the world to places like the Galapagos Islands, Haiti, Cuba, Jamaica, Tahiti and the Marquesas Islands.

When they reached Fiji in 1969, musicians from Auckland, New Zealand, invited Garcia to do some live concerts, radio and television shows and to lecture at various universities around the country on behalf of the New Zealand Broadcasting Commission and Music Trades Association. Russell, when finished with his lectures and concerts and on advice of friends, drove up to the Bay of Islands in the north of North Island. Garcia and his wife fell in love with the location and bought a house on the water's edge of Tangitu Bay in the Te Puna Inlet, east of the Purerua Peninsula near Kerikeri.

They spent many years there, but after they moved to Kerikeri, Garcia continued to compose and arrange, including projects in the United States and around the world. His most recent project prior to his death was his and Gina's first opera, The Unquenchable Flame. Together, the Garcias further volunteered their services on a regular basis to teach primary school children in New Zealand about the virtues gained through the use of songs, stories, games and creative exercises.

== Events and awards ==
On Memorial Day weekend, 2003, Garcia and Buddy Childers had an event Contemporary Concepts Presented – A 4 Day Jazz Festival Celebrating The West Coast Big Band Sound in Concert in Los Angeles. Speakers/Panelists included Garcia, Buddy Childers, Pete Rugolo, and Allyn Ferguson.

On 27 May 2005 the L.A. Jazz Institute honoured Garcia for his more than 60 years of contributions to jazz. The evening was hosted by Tierney Sutton and guest speakers included Bill Holman, Duane Tatro and Bud Shank. Charmed Life: Shaynee Rainbolt Sings Russell Garcia is a recent CD release featuring his work in collaboration.

Russell and Gina Garcia both received the 2009 Queen's Service Medal for New Zealand for their service to music.

== Professional career ==
When he was eleven years old, the Oakland Symphony Orchestra performed his arrangement of "Stardust". By the time Garcia was in high school, he was working five nights a week playing music and earning more than his father, who was a credit manager in a large department store. After one year at San Francisco State University he dropped out because he felt he was not learning enough and instead went on the road with several big bands. But he remained unsatisfied because, he said, "I wasn't advancing fast enough." He recalled, "I quit and went to Hollywood and had lessons with the best teachers I could find." He studied composition, harmony, orchestration, counterpoint and form. He took lessons on every instrument so he could write for each with a deeper awareness, rather than just by ear as he had done in the past. He also conducted the West Hollywood Symphony Orchestra once a week for two years, a remarkable experience for a young man in his 20s; he said it primed him for what was to come.

His first break came in 1939, when the composer/conductor of the radio show This is Our America fell ill and Garcia was recommended to fill in. He so impressed the director, Ronald Reagan, that he was kept on for two years. Reagan was then married to Jane Wyman who recommended Garcia to NBC, where he was hired as a staff composer and arranger. As word got out, he said he never had to look for work: "It's always come to me. I do lead a charmed life." Soon after, Henry Mancini called on Garcia and his extraordinary talent of transcribing note for note, instrument for instrument, to work on The Glenn Miller Story.

Universal Studios contracted Garcia to work as composer, arranger and conductor in the 1950s. He remained in the post for 15 years.

According to Garcia's obituary in the Los Angeles Times and his obituary by Marc Myers in Jazzwax, a daily jazz blog Garcia did the orchestration for "the 65-piece studio symphony" for Charlie Chaplin's 1952 film Limelight. However, in 1972, when Limelight won an Oscar for the best original dramatic score, the three Oscars were given to Chaplin, Raymond Rasch and posthumously to Larry Russell, who was also a composer and movie arranger at the time.

In 1957, through his Universal Studios contract, he arranged and conducted Louis Armstrong and Ella Fitzgerald's record album Porgy And Bess. He undertook three more albums and a concert at the Hollywood Bowl with Armstrong.

Bethlehem Records often called on Garcia for his arranging abilities; he was one of the few Hollywood soundstage and studio veterans who could easily and naturally switch from film scoring to jazz arranging. Developing a parallel career, not only did he provide arrangements for many singers and instrumentalists, he recorded over 60 albums under his own name, as well as composing for cutting-edge projects such as the Stan Kenton Neophonic Orchestra.

He used experimental frameworks on which newer presentations could be fashioned, as he proved, assembling his four-trombone band with brass players Frank Rosolino, Tommy Pederson, Maynard Ferguson and Herbie Harper. Marty Paich can even be heard on some of these sessions at the piano. He used this instrumentation and sound in collaborations with singers like Frances Faye and Anita O'Day, and brought it back in his most recent collaboration: a recording of all Garcia originals with New York vocalist Shaynee Rainbolt.

Although he loved what he was doing, he decided to walk away from it all in 1966. "I fought in the Battle of the Bulge during World War II and vowed that if I ever got out of it alive, I was going to dedicate myself to world peace." The Garcias decided to sail the Pacific Ocean, carrying the message of peace and the Baháʼí Faith to the remote islands of the South Pacific. Garcia said, "Not many people have the chance to follow their hearts with no financial worries. We had the "charm" working for us: we knew the royalties would see us through for some years." They spent the next six years on their 13-metre fiberglass trimaran the Dawn-Breaker, as "traveling teachers," anchoring in such exotic locations as Jamaica, the Galapagos Islands, the Marquesas and Tahiti.

In Fiji, in 1969, the "charm" spun again when musicians visiting from Auckland invited Garcia, on behalf of the New Zealand Broadcasting Commission and the Music Trades Association, to do live concerts, radio and TV shows as well as lecture at universities around the country, a perfect fit seeing as Garcia is also known in music circles as the author of what are considered the definitive textbooks on composition: The Professional Arranger Composer Books I and II. They have been translated into six languages and are used in universities and conservatories around the world.

At the age of ninety-two, Garcia was still composing and touring internationally, and he conducted his own 95th birthday concert in Kerikeri.

== Discography ==
- 1950 – Radar Secret Service
- 1953 – Limelight (miscredited 1972 Oscar for Best Original Dramatic Score given to Raymond Rasch and Larry Russell)
- 1954 – Buddy DeFranco and Oscar Peterson Play George Gershwin
- 1955 – Wigville
- 1955 – Four Horns and a Lush Life
- 1956 – The Johnny Evergreens
- 1956 – That Old Black Magic (Peggy Connelly, leader)
- 1956 - Our New Nellie (Nellie Lutcher, leader)
- 1956/57 – About the Blues (Julie London, leader)
- 1956 – The Complete Porgy and Bess
- 1957 – Porgy and Bess (Ella Fitzgerald and Louis Armstrong)
- 1957 – Louis Under the Stars (Louis Armstrong)
- 1957 – I've Got the World on a String (Louis Armstrong)
- 1957 - Enchantment
- 1957 – The Warm Feeling
- 1957 – Listen to the Music of Russell Garcia
- 1957 – Make Love to Me (Julie London)
- 1957 – Sounds in the Night
- 1957 - Sleepy Lagoon (Si Zentner With Russ Garcia And His Orchestra)
- 1958 – Anita Sings the Winners (Anita O'Day)
- 1958 – Carioca
- 1958 - Here's to My Lady (Bobby Troup With Russ Garcia And His Orchestra)
- 1959 – Get Happy! (Ella Fitzgerald)
- 1959 – Jazz Music for Birds and Hep Cats
- 1959 – Fantastica: Music From Outer Space (see Theodore Keep)
- 1960 – Cool Velvet (see Stan Getz)
- 1960 – Swingin' on the Moon (Mel Tormé)
- 1960 – Margaret Whiting Sings the Jerome Kern Songbook (Margaret Whiting)
- 1960 – Soubrette Sings Broadway Hit Songs (Blossom Dearie)
- 1960 – The Time Machine (soundtrack)
- 1961 – Atlantis, the Lost Continent (soundtrack)
- 1965 – Laredo (soundtrack)
- 1965 – "Adventure in Emotion" on Stan Kenton Conducts the Los Angeles Neophonic Orchestra
- 1966 – The Pad and How to Use It (soundtrack)
- 1968 – Three Guns for Texas (soundtrack)
- 1975 – I'll Never Forget What's Her Name
- 1979 – Variations for Flugelhorn, String Quartet, Bass & Drums
- 1980 – I Lead a Charmed Life
- 1986 – Jazz Variations
- 1996 – Artistry in Jazz Buddy Childers with the Russ Garcia Strings
- 2002 – The Unquenchable Flame (about Táhirih)
- 2009 – Charmed Life: Shaynee Rainbolt Sings Russell Garcia

His Baha'i music includes the music (and non scripture lyrics) for 1960s and 1970s songs "One Heart Ruby Red" (with Donna Taylor), "Nightingale of Paradise" (with Gina Garcia), "Hollow Reed", "We Will Have One World", "The Hatin' Wall" (with Donna Taylor), "Live in the Glory" (with Dorothy Wayne), "Hidden Words", and "Into Parched and Arid Wastelands"

In his nineties, he composed original music for "A Path to Peace", a piece inspired by the Baha'i writings that included his wife's lyrics. The Path to Peace incorporated nine major principles from The Promise of World Peace, published by the Baháʼí international administrative body, the Universal House of Justice, in 1985. The "[p]rinciples that promote peace include the equality of men and women, universal education, and the elimination of extremes of wealth and poverty."
