= Chris Montez discography =

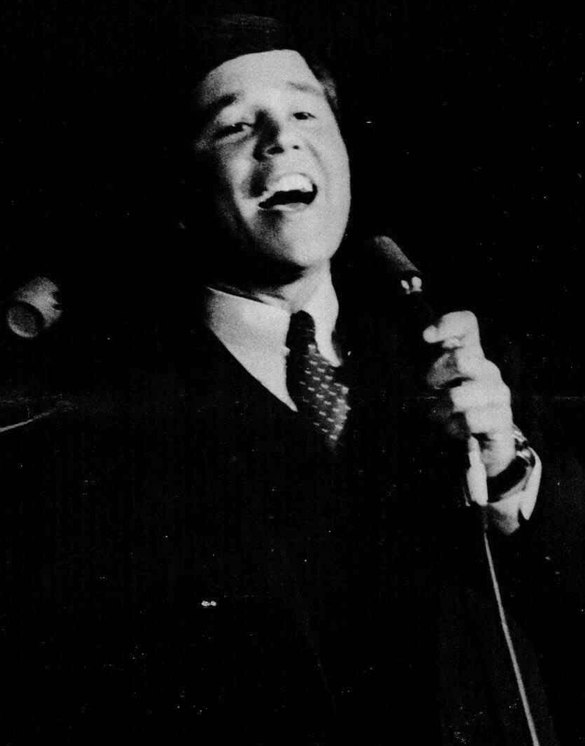
- Montez performing in 1967
- Studio albums: 6
- Live albums: 1
- Compilation albums: Many
- Singles: 22
- Collaboration singles: 2

This is the discography of American pop/rock and easy listening singer Chris Montez. It contains six studio albums, 22 singles and several other releases. Montez's debut single was 1960's "I Lost My Baby" on the Guaranteed label. It missed the charts, and Montez did not return until 1962 when he signed Monogram Records and released "All You Had To Do (Was Tell Me)". The song bubbled under the Hot 100 at No. 108. The following release was "Let's Dance". It was his breakout single, reaching the top-5 in both the United States and United Kingdom.

His next single, "Some Kinda Fun", managed to climb to the top-10 in the UK as well. In 1963, Monogram issued his first album, Let's Dance and Have Some Kinda Fun!!!. During his time with Monogram, Montez recorded two singles with singer Kathy Young, both released in 1964. Montez's next singles were commercial failures, and he left Monogram by 1965. A&M Records label founder Herb Alpert signed Montez onto his label in late 1965. Shifting towards an easy listening style via covering old standards, Montez achieved a comeback with Petula Clark's "Call Me". The Alpert-produced "The More I See You" was swiftly released in 1966, reaching the top-25 in the US, UK, and the Netherlands. It also reached No. 2 on the Billboard Easy Listening survey. A&M released The More I See You in June 1966, performing well in American markets. "There Will Never Be Another You" was taken from the album and released as his third A&M single.

In late 1966, A&M released "Time After Time". It became his final top-40 pop entry in the US, and his final song to reach the top-10 on the easy listening chart. Time After Time was released in December 1966 and yielded similar results to his previous album. In 1967, Foolin' Around was released, which contained two singles, the namesake and "Because of You". As sales decreased and his live album Watch What Happens completely missed the charts, A&M dropped Montez. He would later record with CBS Records in 1972 for a rerecording of "Let's Dance" and other songs. The new "Let's Dance" became a hit in the UK and reached the top-10 again. Montez's final recordings were available on his Spanish project Cartas De Amor. It was released by A&M in 1983 and contained two of his 1970s hits, "Loco Por Ti (Crazy For You)" and "Ay No Digas", which became popular in the Netherlands, the latter peaking at No. 3 in the country.

== Albums ==
=== Studio albums ===
List of albums, with selected chart positions, showing other relevant details
Title	Album details	Peak chart positions		
Title	Album details	US 200	US CB	US RW
Let's Dance and Have Some Fun	Released: 1963; Label: London Records; Formats: LP	—	—	—
The More I See You	Released: June 1966; Label: A&M Records; Formats: LP, 8-track cartridge, 4-track cartridge	33	20	14
Time After Time	Released: December 1966; Label: A&M Records; Formats: LP, 8-track cartridge, 4-track cartridge	106	65	80
Foolin' Around	Released: June 1967; Label: A&M Records; Formats: LP, 8-track cartridge, 4-track cartridge	—	—	104
Let's Dance	Released: 1972; Label: CBS Records; Formats: LP	—	—	—
Cartas De Amor	Released: 1983; Label: A&M Records; Formats: LP	—	—	—

=== Live albums ===
List of live albums showing relevant details
Title	Album details
Watch What Happens	Released: October 1968; Label: A&M Records; Formats: LP, 8-track cartridge, 4-track cartridge; Recorded at: unknown

== Singles ==
List of singles, with selected chart positions, showing other relevant details
Titles (A-side, B-side) Both sides from same album except where indicated	Year	Peak chart positions				Album
Titles (A-side, B-side) Both sides from same album except where indicated	Year	US	US AC	UK	NL	Album
"I Lost My Baby" b/w "They Say"	1960	—	—	—	—	Non-album tracks
"All You Had To Do (Was Tell Me)" b/w "Love Me" (Non-album track)	1962	108	—	—	—	Let's Dance and Have Some Kinda Fun!!!
"Let's Dance" b/w "You're The One"	1962	4	—	2	—	Let's Dance and Have Some Kinda Fun!!!
"Some Kinda Fun" b/w "Tell Me (It's Not Over)"	1962	43	—	10	—	Let's Dance and Have Some Kinda Fun!!!
"(Let's Do) The Limbo" b/w "Rockin' Blues"	1963	—	—	—	—	Let's Dance and Have Some Kinda Fun!!!
"In An English Towne" b/w "My Baby Loves To Dance"	1963	129	—	—	—	Non-album tracks
"Monkey Fever" b/w "No, No, No" (from Let's Dance...)	1963	—	—	—	—	Non-album tracks
"All You Had To Do (Was Tell Me)" b/w "You're The One" Both tracks are duets with Kathy Young	1964	125	—	—	—	Non-album tracks
"It Takes Two" b/w "Shoot That Curl" Both tracks are duets with Kathy Young	1964	—	—	—	—	Non-album tracks
"Call Me" b/w "Go Head On" (Non-album track)	1965	22	2	—	—	The More I See You
"The More I See You" b/w "You, I Love You"	1966	16	2	3	25	The More I See You
"There Will Never Be Another You" b/w "You Can Hurt The One You Love" (Non-album track)	1966	33	4	37	—	The More I See You
"Time After Time" b/w "Keep Talkin'"	1966	36	12	—	—	Time After Time
"Because of You" b/w "Elena" (from Time After Time)	1967	71	25	—	—	Foolin' Around
"Foolin' Around" b/w "Dindi (Jin-jee)"	1967	135	—	—	—	Foolin' Around
"The Face I Love" b/w "Once in a While" (from Foolin' Around)	1968	—	15	—	—	Watch What Happens
"Love Is Here To Stay" b/w "Nothing To Hide"	1968	—	38	—	—	Watch What Happens
"Watch What Happens" b/w "Where Are You Now"	1968	—	—	—	—	Watch What Happens
"The End Of The Line" b/w "We Can Make The World A Whole Lot Brighter"	1971	—	—	—	—	Non-album tracks
"Let's Dance (1972)" b/w "Some Kinda Fun"	1972	—	—	9	—	Non-album tracks
"Loco Por Ti (Crazy For You)" b/w "The Part You Play Best Is Yourself"	1972	—	—	—	7	Non-album tracks
"Ay No Digas" b/w "Heart And Soul"	1973	—	—	—	3	Non-album tracks
"Amor Y Paz" b/w "Yesterday I Heard the Rain"	1974	—	—	—	—	Non-album tracks
