= List of Cash Box Best Sellers number-one singles of 1951 =

These are the songs that reached number one on the Top 40 Best Sellers chart (expanded to the Top 50 as of October 13) in 1951 as published by Cash Box magazine. Artists were not specified in the charts of this period so songs may represent more than one version. The artist who most popularized each song is listed.

Issue date	Song	Artist
January 6	"Tennessee Waltz"	Patti Page
January 13	"Tennessee Waltz"	Patti Page
January 20	"Tennessee Waltz"	Patti Page
January 27	"Tennessee Waltz"	Patti Page
February 3	"Tennessee Waltz"	Patti Page
February 10	"My Heart Cries For You"	Guy Mitchell
February 17	"My Heart Cries For You"	Guy Mitchell
February 24	"My Heart Cries For You"	Guy Mitchell
March 3	"Be My Love"	Mario Lanza
March 10	"Be My Love"	Mario Lanza
March 17	"Be My Love"	Mario Lanza
March 24	"Be My Love"	Mario Lanza
March 31	"Be My Love"	Mario Lanza
April 7	"If"	Perry Como
April 14	"If"	Perry Como
April 21	"Mockin' Bird Hill"	Patti Page
April 28	"Mockin' Bird Hill"	Patti Page
May 5	"Mockin' Bird Hill"	Patti Page
May 12	"Mockin' Bird Hill"	Patti Page
May 19	"On Top of Old Smoky"	The Weavers
May 26	"Mockin' Bird Hill"	Patti Page
June 2	"On Top of Old Smoky"	The Weavers
June 9	"Too Young"	Nat King Cole
June 16	"How High The Moon"	Les Paul and Mary Ford
June 23	"How High The Moon"	Les Paul and Mary Ford
June 30	"Too Young"	Nat King Cole
July 7	"Too Young"	Nat King Cole
July 14	"Too Young"	Nat King Cole
July 21	"Too Young"	Nat King Cole
July 28	"Too Young"	Nat King Cole
August 4	"Too Young"	Nat King Cole
August 11	"Come On-a My House"	Rosemary Clooney
August 18	"Come On-a My House"	Rosemary Clooney
August 25	"Because of You"	Tony Bennett
September 1	"Sweet Violets"	Dinah Shore
September 8	"Come On-a My House"	Rosemary Clooney
September 15	"Because of You"	Tony Bennett
September 22	"Because of You"	Tony Bennett
September 29	"Because of You"	Tony Bennett
October 6	"Because of You"	Tony Bennett
October 13	"Because of You"	Tony Bennett
October 20	"Because of You"	Tony Bennett
October 27	"Because of You"	Tony Bennett
November 3	"(It's No) Sin"	Eddy Howard
November 10	"(It's No) Sin"	Eddy Howard
November 17	"(It's No) Sin"	Eddy Howard
November 24	"(It's No) Sin"	Eddy Howard
December 1	"(It's No) Sin"	Eddy Howard
December 8	"(It's No) Sin"	Eddy Howard
December 15	"Down Yonder"	Del Wood
December 22	"(It's No) Sin"	Eddy Howard
December 29	"(It's No) Sin"	Eddy Howard

== See also ==
- 1951 in music
- List of number-one singles of 1951 (U.S.)
