= Foolin' Around (album) =

Studio album by Chris Montez
- Released: June 1967
- Studio: Sunset Sound
- Genre: Pop
- Length: 28:14
- Label: A&M
- Producers: Herb Alpert; Larry Marks

Chris Montez chronology
Time After Time (1966)	Foolin' Around (1967)	Watch What Happens (1968)

Singles from Foolin' Around
- 1. "Because of You" Released: February 1967; 2. "Foolin' Around" Released: May 1967

Foolin' Around is a studio album by American pop singer Chris Montez. It was released in July 1967 via A&M and was the fourth studio album of his career. Foolin' Around contained 12 tracks, including the two singles, "Because of You" and the title track "Foolin' Around". Both singles climbed to the US pop charts, while "Because of You" entered the Billboard Easy Listening chart. The album received positive reviews from several contemporary publications and reached number 104 in the US.

== Recording and release ==
The songs for Foolin' Around were recorded in late 1966 under two producers, Larry Marks and the label's founder Herb Alpert. Arrangements were provided by Nick DeCaro. Like on his previous albums, most of the tracks chosen were standards, ("I Didn't Know What Time It Was", "Once in a While", "I'm Glad There Is You"), with some contemporary hit songs ("On a Clear Day (You Can See Forever)", "Girl Talk"). Foolin' Around was originally released in June 1967 by A&M, the label's only album released in late june. It was the fourth studio album of Montez's career, and also the first of the year. The label originally offered it as a vinyl LP, with six songs on "Side A" and six songs on "Side B". Decades later, the album was re-released for streaming to digital sites.

== Reception ==
The album received several positive reviews upon its release. Record World selected it for its "Albums of the Week" section, writing that "the A&M zephyr picks tunes off like petals from a daisy on his Foolin' Around package with ditties "Once in a While" [and] "On a Clear Day". Cashbox magazine believed that "The artist sings with his customary light, breezy, easy-going delivery," noting that the "disk should go over big with the chanter's followers."

== Chart performance and singles ==
Foolin' Around marked Montez's final album to chart. Despite missing the Billboard and Cashbox charts, the album did successfully reach the LP chart published by Record World. The album debuted on the Record World LP's Coming Up chart in the issue dated July 29, 1967, peaking at number 104 during a ten-week run on it.

Two singles were included on Foolin' Around. The first single, "Because of You", was released in February 1967, becoming a top-40 single on America's Billboard Easy Listening chart, rising to the number 25 position. The single became another pop hit for Montez as well, reaching the bottom half on the Billboard Hot 100 at number 71. The title track "Foolin' Around" was first released by A&M as a single in May 1967. The track "bubbled under" the Billboard Hot 100, reaching number 35 (135) on July 29, 1967.

== Track listing ==
Side one
No.	Title	Writer(s)	Length
1.	"Foolin' Around"	Blume; Jack Keller	2:15
2.	"On a Clear Day (You Can See Forever)"	Alan Jay Lerner; Burton Lane	2:26
3.	"The End of a Love Affair"	Edward C. Redding	2:28
4.	"Once I Loved (O Amor em Paz)"	Antônio Carlos Jobim; Vinicius de Moraes; Ray Gilbert	3:00
5.	"Girl Talk"	Bobby Troup; Neal Hefti	2:42
6.	"Because of You"	Arthur Hammerstein; Dudley Wilkinson	2:30
Total length:			15:21

Side two
No.	Title	Writer(s)	Length
1.	"I'm Glad There Is You"	Jimmy Dorsey; Paul Madeira	2:49
2.	"Once in a While"	Bud Green; Michael Edwards	2:08
3.	"Dindi"	Antônio Carlos Jobim; Aloysio de Oliveira; Ray Gilbert	3:05
4.	"A Taste of Honey"	Bobby Scott; Ric Marlow	2:12
5.	"I Didn't Know What Time It Was"	Richard Rodgers; Lorenz Hart	2:39
Total length:			12:53

== Charts ==
Chart performance for Foolin' Around
Chart (1967)	Peak position
US Record World LP's Coming Up	104

== Personnel ==
All credits are adapted from the liner notes of Foolin' Around.

- Herb Alpert (tracks: A6) – producer
- Larry Marks (tracks: A1 to A5; B1 to B6) – producer
- Bruce Botnick – recording engineer
- Nick DeCaro (tracks: A1) – arranger
- Peter Whorf Graphics – design
- Derek Taylor – liner notes
- George Jerman – liner photo
- Chris Montez – lead vocals
