= The Merry Macs =

American vocal quartet

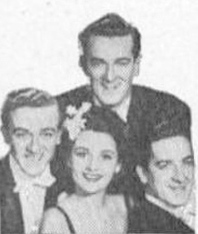
The Merry Macs (Clockwise from top: Judd McMichael, Ted McMichael, Mary Lou Cook, Joe McMichael)

The Merry Macs were an American and British close-harmony pop music quartet who were active from the 1920s until 2000. They were best known for the hits "Mairzy Doats", "Praise the Lord and Pass the Ammunition" and "Sentimental Journey". The group also sang on recordings with Bing Crosby.

Formed to play proms in Minneapolis, Minnesota, the group originally consisted of the three McMichael brothers: tenors Judd (1906–1989) and Joe (1916–1944), and baritone Ted (1908–2001). They were discovered by organist-bandleader Eddie Dunstedter of station WCCO, who suggested they perform in masks and dubbed them The Mystery Trio.

In 1931–32, the McMichaels toured with the orchestra of arranger-composer Joe Haymes, who renamed them The Personality Boys. By 1933 they added a female lead singer, Cheri McKay, and changed their name to The Merry Macs. At Haymes' recommendation, Victor Records engaged the group for one single that year, their first recording.

In 1936, they appeared on several national radio programs, and Cheri McKay was replaced by Helen Carroll. (McKay trained her successor in the group's singing style). Another recording session followed with Ray Noble's orchestra. The Merry Macs started appearing with Fred Allen on Town Hall Tonight starting on November 17, 1937. In September 1938, they signed a contract with Allen for the 1938–1939 season, and they remained until the end of the 1940 season.

Vocal quartets had customarily harmonized like barbershop quartets. The Merry Macs revolutionized vocal harmony with closer harmonic chords. This style inspired other groups, like The Modernaires and Six Hits and a Miss. In 1938 The Merry Macs signed with Decca Records and recorded "Pop Goes the Weasel". The Merry Macs (with Carroll) sang a swing version of "Down by the Old Mill Stream" in the 1939 Vitaphone musical Seeing Red, Red Skelton's first film.

In 1939, Mary Lou Cook (1908–1944) replaced Helen Carroll. This is the foursome that most listeners know from film appearances. The McMichael brothers and Cook appeared as a specialty act in Hollywood movies, including 1940's Love Thy Neighbor, and Universal Pictures gave The Merry Macs their own feature-film series in 1941. Their most famous film is Ride 'Em Cowboy (1942), an Abbott and Costello comedy in which The Merry Macs offer musical interludes. At the time, Cook was married to actor Elisha Cook, Jr.; she ended both her marriage and her affiliation with The Merry Macs at about the same time.

Marjory Garland (1923–1991) replaced Mary Lou Cook after Ride 'Em Cowboy was filmed. The Merry Macs continued to score on the hit parade; their version of "Mairzy Doats" was a best-seller. Garland, who later married Judd McMichael, remained with the group for two decades. Imogene Lynn was the group's female lead singer in 1946–1947.

Youngest brother Joe McMichael served in the armed forces and died in 1944 following an accidental overdose of Sulfa tablets while ill. He was replaced by Clive Erard, then Dick Baldwin, and finally Vern Rowe. The foursome of Judd, Ted, Marjory, and Vern continued performing until Judd retired from show business in 1964.

1964-2000 Vern and Ted took The Merry Macs to the U.K. where they made their home until Vern and Ted retired in 1967 and returned to the U.S. The Merry Macs continued in Britain making its base on the south coast Salisbury Wiltshire until 2000 when Harold Lambert, John Reg Peter and their female vocalist Lettice Mackenzie Campbell retired from the music entertainment industry. Cheri McKay was the first female vocalist (1933–36) with Lettice Mackenzie Campbell being the last and the longest serving (1977-2000) with The Merry Macs.

== Awards and recognition ==
The Merry Macs were inducted into the Vocal Group Hall of Fame in 2003.

== Selected singles ==
- "Igloo" / "I'm Forever Blowing Bubbles" (Decca 2506, 1939)
- "In the Mood" / "Shoot the Sherbert to Me, Herbert" (Decca 2942. 1939)
- "Chopsticks" / "Too Tired" (Decca Y5397, 1940)
- "Deep in the Heart of Texas" / "Kimaneero Down to Cairo" (Decca 4136, 1942)
- "Ten Days with Baby" / "Thank Dixie for Me" (Decca 18630, 1944)
- "Anyone Can Dream" / "Baby Darlin'" (Majestic 7268, 1947)

== Selected albums ==
- The Very Merry Macs (Capitol T850, 1957)
- Something Old, New, Borrowed & Blue (Era 20006, 1957)
