= Joan Merrill =

American singer

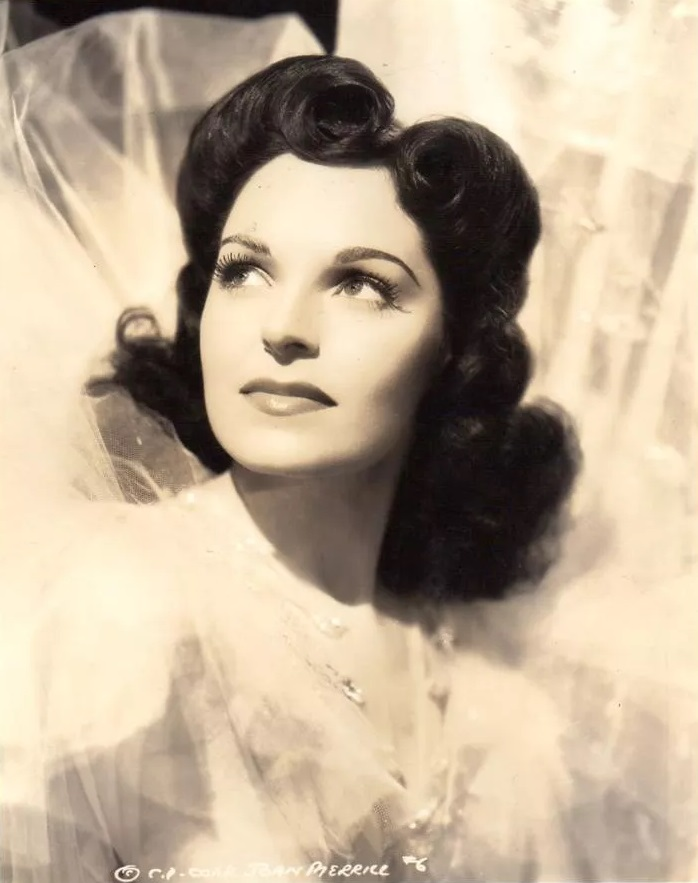
- Born: January 2, 1918; Baltimore, Maryland, U.S
- Died: May 10, 1992 (aged 74); New York, New York, U.S.

Joan Merrill (January 2, 1918 – May 10, 1992) was an American singer and actress.

== Career ==
Merrill began her career in the 1930s on radio, and later sang at nightclubs across the United States, including at the Copacabana in New York City, the Thunderbird in Las Vegas, Nevada, and the Rio Cabana in Chicago. In addition to live performances, she starred in the 1941 musical film Time Out for Rhythm and, in 1942, had roles in The Mayor of 44th Street and Iceland, in which she introduced the song "There Will Never Be Another You", which became a jazz standard. Following popular themes of American music during World War II, her songs were patriotic and inspired by her country's involvement in World War II.

Merrill died in New York City on May 10, 1992, at age 74.

== Film performances ==
Time Out for Rhythm (1941)

- "Obviously the Gentleman Prefers to Dance"

Iceland (1942)

- "You Can't Say No to a Soldier"
- "I Like a Military Tune"
- "There Will Never Be Another You"
