= Swing Shift Cinderella =

1945 film by Tex Avery

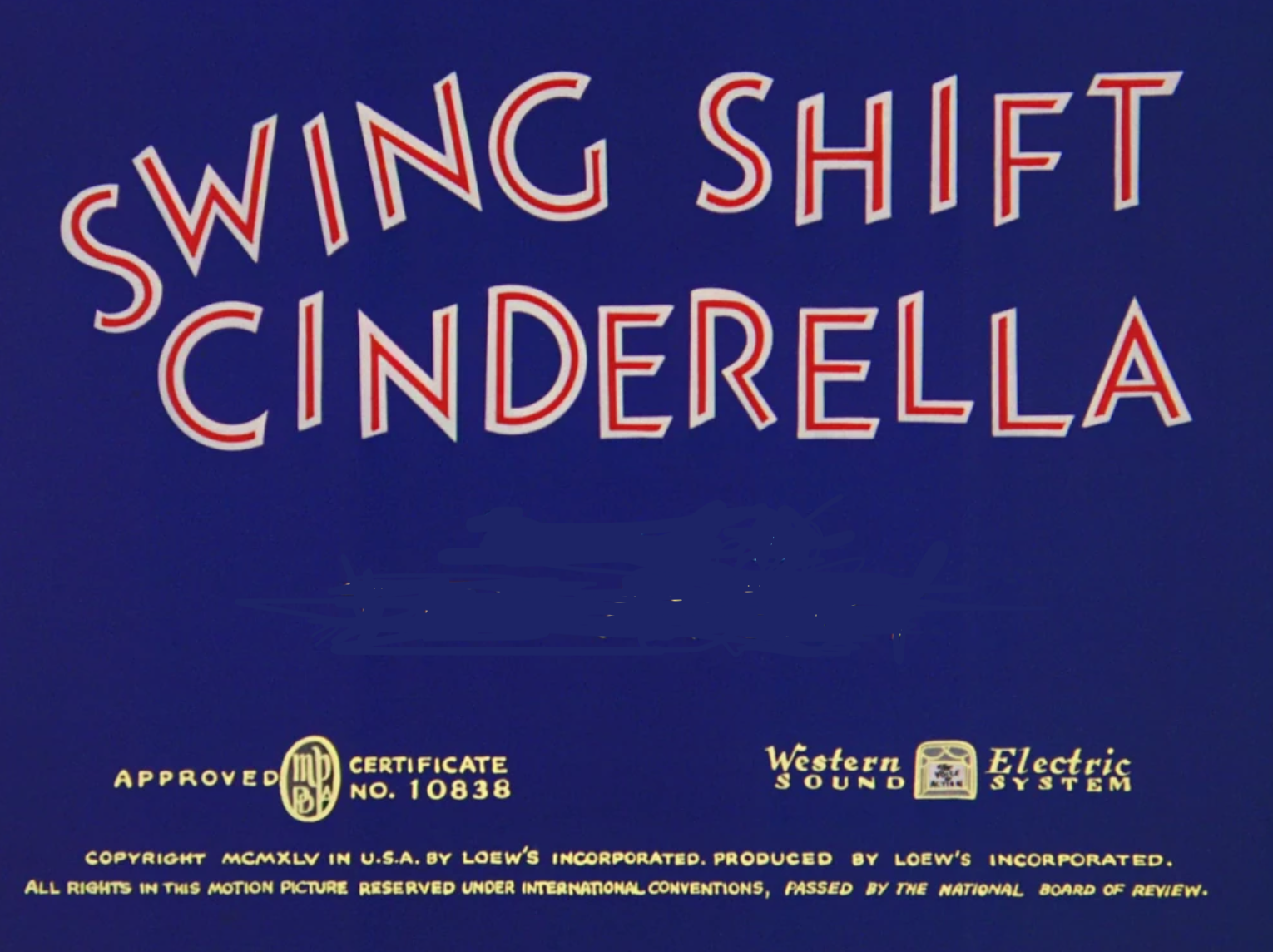
- Title card; Avery is credited on the reissue instead of a separate frame.
- Directed by: Tex Avery
- Story by: Heck Allen
- Produced by: Fred Quimby
- Starring: Frank Graham; Sara Berner; Imogene Lynn
- Music by: Scott Bradley
- Animation by: Ray Abrams; Preston Blair; Ed Love
- Color process: Technicolor
- Production company: MGM cartoon studio
- Distributed by: Metro-Goldwyn-Mayer
- Release date: August 25, 1945
- Running time: 7 minutes, 30 seconds
- Country: United States
- Language: English

Swing Shift Cinderella is a 1945 MGM animated cartoon short subject directed by Tex Avery. The plot involves the Big Bad Wolf and Cinderella. Frank Graham voiced the wolf, and Sara Berner voiced both Cinderella and The Fairy Grandmother, with Imogene Lynn providing the former's singing voice.

== Plot ==
At the beginning of the cartoon, the Big Bad Wolf is chasing Little Red Riding Hood. But then Little Red Riding Hood stops and points out that the two of them are in the wrong cartoon. (Reprising a similar gag from another Avery short released earlier the same year, The Screwy Truant.) The Wolf shoos her away and decides to go and meet Cinderella (played by Red from Red Hot Riding Hood; with a voice sounding like Bette Davis). He takes a taxi to her house and immediately falls in love with her upon seeing her, but she sternly rebuffs him. Eventually, Cinderella calls her Fairy Godmother (whose voice is reminiscent of Barbara Jo Allen's) to get rid of him and set her up for that night's ball. The second the Fairy Godmother hears that there is a Wolf, she rushes right over. The Fairy Godmother traps the Wolf, then gives Cinderella a red evening gown and transforms a pumpkin into a Woodie for her to go the ball, but tells Cinderella that she has to get home by midnight (just like in the classic fairy tale).

The oversexed Fairy Godmother then keeps the Wolf busy. She appears before him in an old-fashioned 1890s swimsuit ("Miss Repulsive 1898") and then an evening gown before trying to snuggle up to him on the couch. She chases him all around Cinderella's house, but the Wolf escapes when he gets the Fairy Godmother's wand, turning Cinderella's bathtub into a convertible. He leaves for the nightclub where Cinderella is performing, with the Fairy Godmother in pursuit. Soon after arriving, the Wolf accidentally kisses the Fairy Godmother, thinking she was Cinderella, which only further deepens her lust for the Wolf. Cinderella soon comes out on-stage and performs a show dance while singing the song "Oh Wolfie" (to the tune of "Oh Johnny, Oh Johnny, Oh!"). The Wolf howls and chases after Cinderella, but the smitten Godmother uses various methods (usually a mallet) to keep him in line.

When the clock strikes midnight, the Fairy Godmother warns Cinderella and she leaves, but not before the Wolf resumes his chase. The Godmother once again tries to stop him, but this time, the Wolf uses her own methods against her and pursues Cinderella. Cinderella rushes home as the Fairy Godmother's transformation wears off, but she manages to make it home in time—it turns out that Cinderella is a Rosie the Riveter and that the reason she had to be home by midnight was so she would not be late for the night shift at Lockweed. Cinderella is relieved to be rid of the Wolf, but to her dismay and horror, it is revealed that the bus is full of wolves, who start wolf-whistling and catcalling at her as the cartoon ends.

== Voice Cast ==
All voice actors are uncreditied:

- Frank Graham as The Wolf / M.C. / Wolves on the Bus
- Sara Berner as Little Red Riding Hood / Cinderella / Fairy Godmother
  - Imogene Lynn as Cinderella singing "Oh, Wolfe, Oh"
- Billy Bletcher and Sara Berner as Evil Laughs and Screams (reused from Who Killed Who?)

== Analysis ==
The short includes wartime references. The motor scooter of the fairy godmother displays an "A" gas ration sticker. She later uses a jeep. Cinderella is a welder, working the midnight shift at the Lockweed Aircraft Plant. There is also a female cabdriver depicted, a frequently used motif during the War.
