= Watch What Happens (album) =

Live album by Chris Montez
- Released: October 1968
- Genres: Pop; easy listening
- Length: 29:04
- Label: A&M
- Producer: Nick DeCaro

Chris Montez chronology
Foolin' Around (1967)	Watch What Happens (1968)	Let's Dance (1972)

Singles from Foolin' Around
- 1. "The Face I Love" Released: February 1968; 2. "Love Is Here to Stay" Released: July 1968; 3. "Watch What Happens" Released: October 1968

Watch What Happens is a live album by American pop singer Chris Montez. It was released in October 1968 via A&M and was the fifth album of his career. Watch What Happens contained 11 tracks, including three singles, "The Face I Love," "Love Is Here to Stay," and the title track "Watch What Happens". The first two singles reached the US Billboard Easy Listening chart. The album received positive reviews from several contemporary publications but failed to chart. It was his final A&M release.

== Recording and release ==
The songs for Watch What Happens were recorded live in 1968. Production was handles by Nick DeCaro, Montez's first album to have one producer. Arrangements were provided by him as well. Like on his previous albums, several of the tracks chosen were standards, ("Love Is a Many-Splendored Thing", "Love Is Here to Stay", "We'll Be Together Again"), with some contemporary hit songs such as ("I Will Wait for You" and "The Look of Love"). Watch What Happens was originally released in June 1967 by A&M. It was the fifth overall album of Montez's career, and also the first of the year. The label originally offered it as a vinyl LP, with six songs on "Side A" and five songs on "Side B". Decades later, the album was re-released for streaming to digital sites.

== Reception ==
The album received several positive reviews upon its release. Record World selected it for its "Pick Hits" section, writing that "Montez continues to update the standards with his gossamer delivery," adding that "The lad was recorded with a live audience, enjoying 'Love Is Here To Stay,' 'The Face I Love,' 'The Look of Love' and like that." Honolulu Star-Advertiser believed that the album is "gently romantic, an assemblage of familiar balladry," highlighting the same tracks. The Oregon Daily Journal noted that "Teens who don't trust anyone over 30–ie, Frank Sinatra, Eddie Fisher–can hear and rediscover muted versions of 'Love Is Here to Stay,' and 'Love Is Many Splendored Thing."

== Chart performance and singles ==
Three singles were included on Watch What Happens. The first single, "The Face I Love", was released in February 1968, becoming a top-20 single on America's Billboard Easy Listening chart, rising to the number 15 position, his largest hit on the chart since 1966. The next single was a 1938 jazz standard titled "Love Is Here to Stay", released in July 1968. The release climbed to the top-40 on the Billboard Easy Listening chart at No. 38. The title track "Watch What Happens" from The Umbrellas of Cherbourg was released concurrently with the main album.

== Track listing ==
Side one
No.	Title	Writer(s)	Length
1.	"Love Is Here to Stay"	George Gershwin; Ira Gershwin	2:23
2.	"The Face I Love"	Carlos Pingarilho; Marcos Valle; Ray Gilbert	2:09
3.	"I Will Wait for You"	Michel Legrand; Norman Gimbel	2:20
4.	"Watch What Happens"	Michel Legrand; Norman Gimbel	2:36
5.	"We'll Be Together Again"	Carl T. Fischer; Frank Laine	2:11
6.	"Love Is a Many-Splendored Thing"	Paul Francis Webster; Sammy Fain	2:46
Total length:			14:25

Side two
No.	Title	Writer(s)	Length
1.	"Where Are You Now"	Jackie Trent; Tony Hatch	2:54
2.	"Quiet Nights of Quiet Stars (Corcovado)"	Antônio Carlos Jobim; Gene Lees	2:57
3.	"Spooky"	B. Buie; Harry Middlebrooks; J.B. Cobb; Mike Shapiro	3:08
4.	"Nothing to Hide"	Chris Montez	2:40
5.	"The Look of Love"	Bacharach; David	3:00
Total length:			14:39

== Personnel ==
All credits are adapted from the liner notes of Watch What Happens.

- Chris Montez – lead vocals
- Nick DeCaro – producer, arranger
- Doc Siegel – mixing engineer
- James Hilton – recording engineer
- Tom Wilkes – art direction
- Derek Taylor – liner notes
- Roger Webster – photography
