= Dorothy Vaughan (actress) =

American actress (1890–1955)

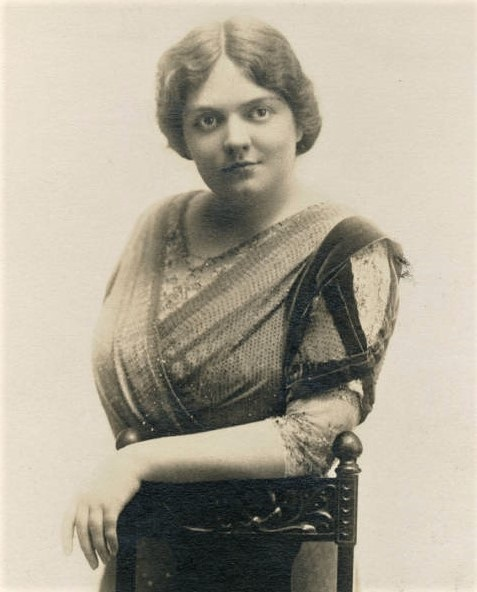
- Vaughan in 1913
- Born: November 5, 1890; St. Louis, Missouri, U.S.
- Died: March 15, 1955 (aged 64); Hollywood, Los Angeles, California, U.S.
- Other names: Dorothy Vaughn
- Occupation: Actress
- Years active: 1913–1953

Dorothy Vaughan (November 5, 1890 – March 15, 1955) was an American actress. She appeared in more than 143 films and television. Vaughan is best known for appearing in Slander House (1930), The Ape (1940) and Lady Gangster (1942). She was sometimes credited as Dorothy Vaughn.

== Filmography ==
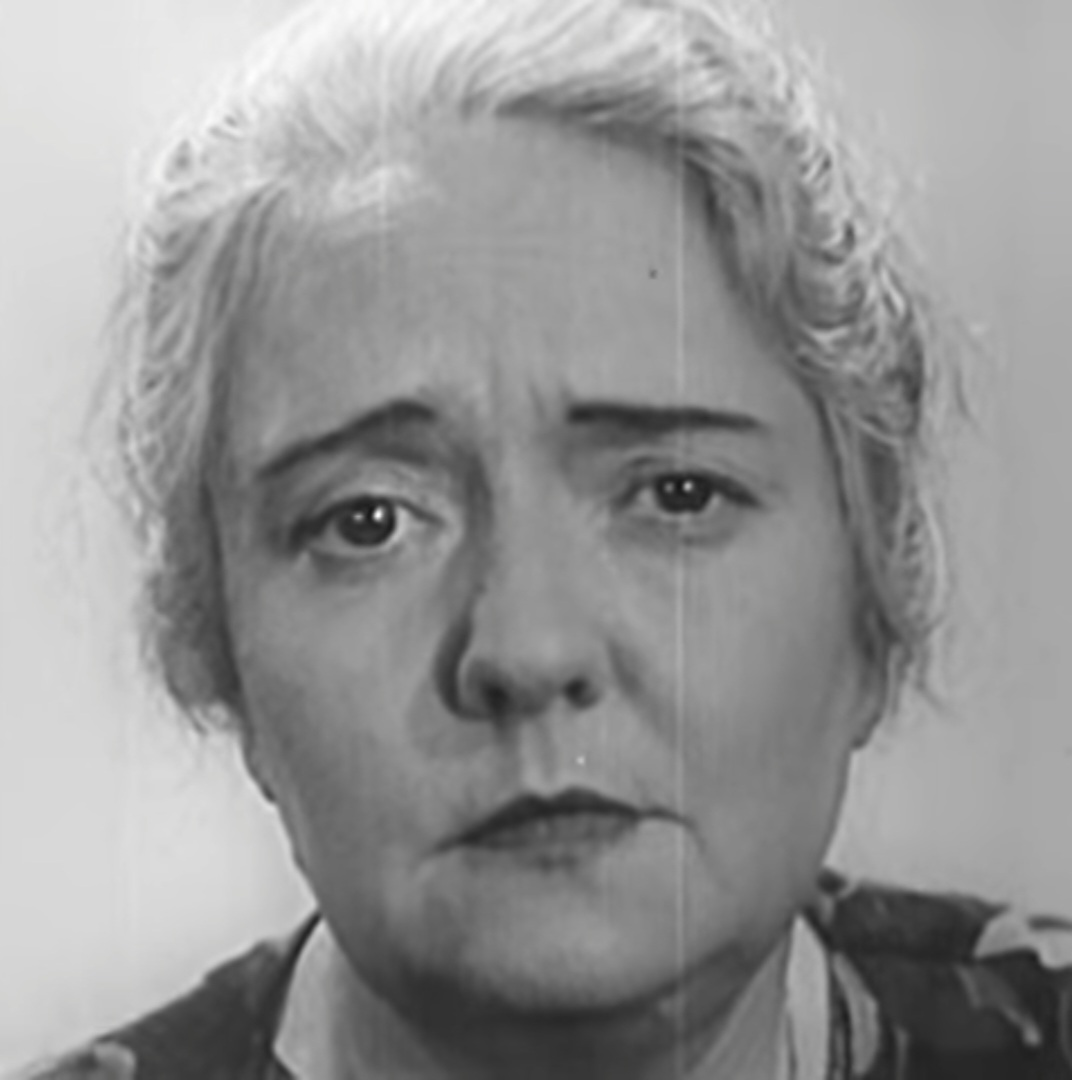
Vaughan in Slander House (1938)

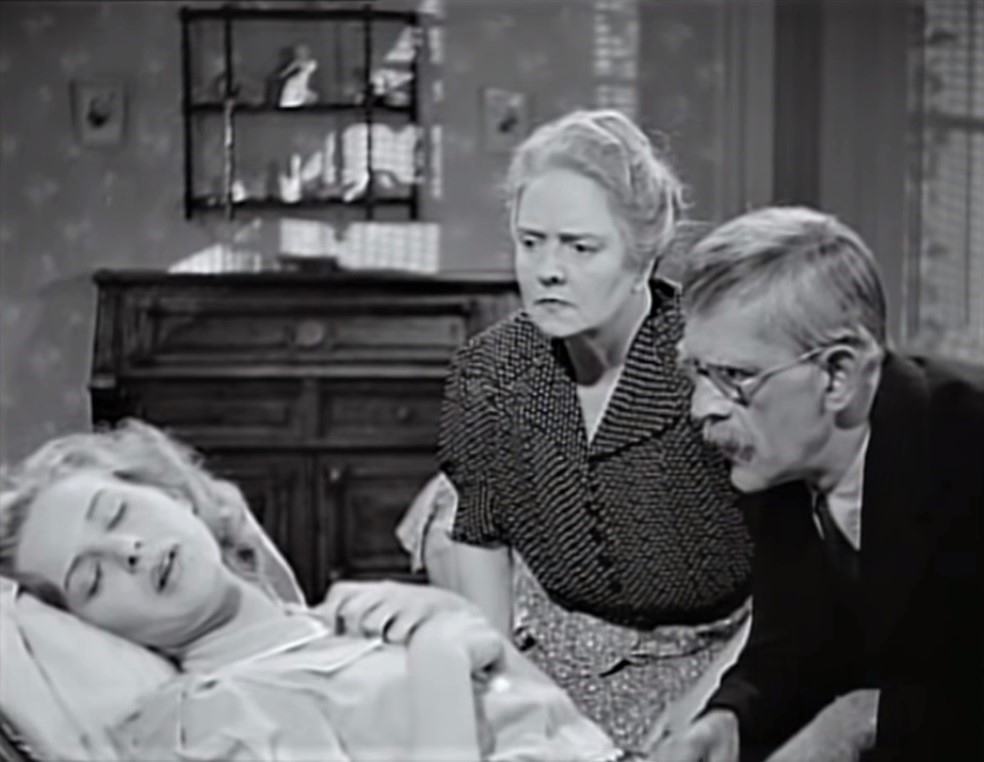
Left to right: Maris Wrixon, Dorothy Vaughan, and Boris Karloff in The Ape (1940)

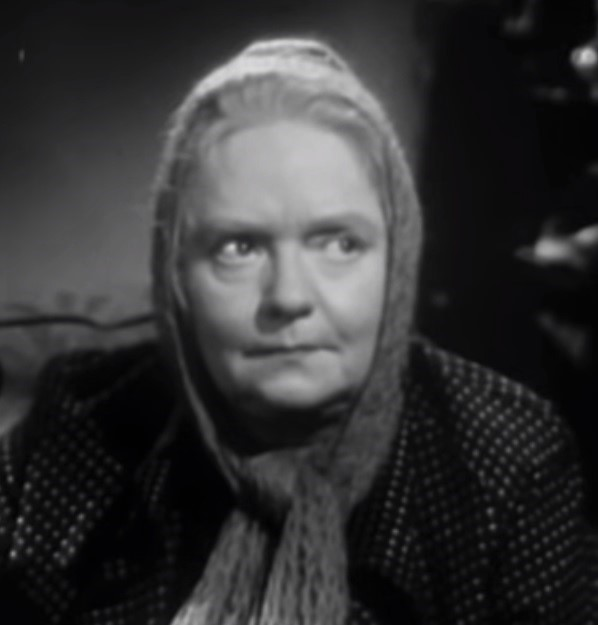
Vaughan in That Brennan Girl (1946)

=== Film ===
Year	Title	Role	Notes
1935	Annapolis Farewell	Chaperone	(uncredited)
1935	Mary Burns, Fugitive	Irish Hospital Matron	
1936	I Married a Doctor	Hospital Nurse	(uncredited)
1936	Times Square Playboy	Mrs. Nellie Calhoun	
1936	Love Begins at 20	Evalina 'Evie' Gillingwater	
1936	After the Thin Man	Charlotte	(uncredited)
1937	Black Legion	Mrs. Grogan	
1937	That Man's Here Again	Mrs. Mathews	(uncredited)
1937	There Goes My Girl	Pedestrian Grabbing Connie	(uncredited)
1937	Slim	Nurse	(uncredited)
1937	Hoosier Schoolboy	Miss Hodges the School Mistress	
1937	Stella Dallas	Stella	(uncredited)
1937	Mr. Dodd Takes the Air	Marjorie's Neighbor	(uncredited)
1937	The Life of the Party	Dressmaker	(uncredited)
1937	Conquest	Innkeeper	(uncredited)
1937	Telephone Operator	Mrs. Molloy	(as Dorothy Vaughn)
1937	Quick Money	Lyda Tompkins	
1937	Assassin of Youth	Mrs. Mary Barry	
1938	Here's Flash Casey	Mrs. O'Hara	(as Dorothy Vaughn)
1938	Little Miss Thoroughbred	Mrs. Katie O'Reilly	(as Dorothy Vaughn)
1938	Slander House	Mrs. Horton	(as Dorothy Vaughn)
1938	Little Orphan Annie	Mrs. Milligan	
1938	Gambling Ship	Marton	(as Dorothy Vaughn)
1939	Calling Dr. Kildare	Mother of Baby Vaughan	(uncredited)
1939	The Man in the Iron Mask	Midwife	
1939	First Love	Ollie, Mrs. Clinton's Maid	
1940	Hot Steel	Mrs. Morrison	
1940	The Ape	Mother Clifford	
1940	Diamond Frontier	Mrs. Wilhelm	
1941	Secret Evidence	Mrs. Wilson	
1941	Bad Men of Missouri	Mrs. Dalton	
1941	Burma Convoy	Mrs. Hubert	
1941	Three Girls About Town	Mrs. McDougall	
1942	Lady Gangster	Jenkins	
1942	Gentleman Jim	Ma Corbett	
1943	Doughboys in Ireland	Mrs. Callahan	
1943	Moonlight in Vermont	Mrs. Costello	
1944	Henry Aldrich's Little Secret	Mrs. Olsen	
1944	Dancing in Manhattan	Mrs. Bundy	
1944	The Town Went Wild	Nurse Irma Reeves	
1946	Riverboat Rhythm	Belle Crowley	
1946	The Bamboo Blonde	Mom	
1946	That Brennan Girl	Mrs. Reagan, Denny's Mother	
1947	Trail to San Antone	The Commodore	
1947	The Egg and I	Maid	
1947	Robin Hood of Texas	Mrs. O'Brien	
1947	The Bishop's Wife	Delia	
1948	Song of Idaho	Sarah Russell	
1948	I Wouldn't Be in Your Shoes	Mrs. Alvin	
1949	Fighting Fools	Mrs. Higgins	
1949	Home in San Antone	Ma Gidson	
1950	Square Dance Katy	Ma O'Connor	
1950	Rider from Tucson	Mrs. Brigitte O'Rielly	
1952	The Merry Widow	Attendant	(uncredited)
1952	The Star	Annie - Old Biddy in Department Store	(uncredited)

=== Television ===
Year	Title	Role	Notes
1949	The Silver Theatre	Granny Wayne	1 episode
1950	The Lone Ranger	Mrs. Whitcomb	1 episode (as Dorothy Vaughn)
1951	Fireside Theatre	Ma	1 episode
1952	The Roy Rogers Show	Ma Colton	1 episode
1952	Sky King	Mrs. McNeil	1 episode
1952	Chevron Theatre		1 episode
1953	Four Star Playhouse	Mrs. McNeil	1 episode
1953	The Abbott and Costello Show	Sarah	1 episode
