= Slander House =

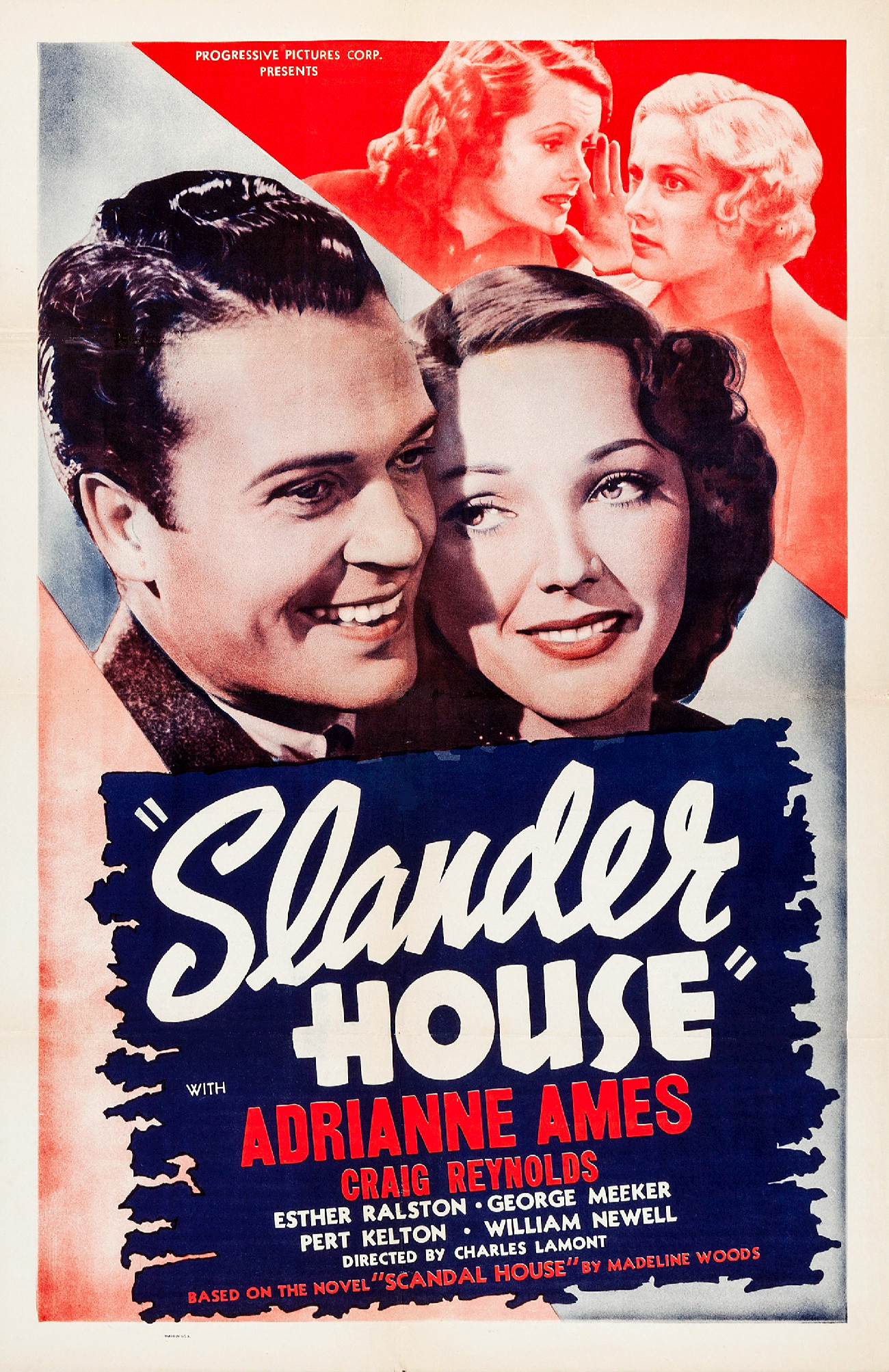
- Film poster
- Directed by: Charles Lamont
- Written by: John W. Krafft (writer); Gertrude Orr (writer); Madeline Woods (novel Scandal House)
- Produced by: Ben Judell (producer); Melville Shyer (associate producer)
- Starring: See below
- Cinematography: M.A. Anderson
- Edited by: S. Roy Luby
- Production company: Progressive Pictures
- Release date: 4 October 1938
- Running time: 65 minutes
- Country: United States
- Language: English

Slander House is a 1938 American drama film directed by Charles Lamont. The film's producer was Ben Judell of Progressive Pictures, known for low-budget exploitation films with provocative titles; other films released by Progressive the same year included Rebellious Daughters and Delinquent Parents.

== Plot ==
Helen Smith and Mazie Mason run a salon for wealthy women to keep their figures and bodies in shape. Helen is dating a doctor whose aunt is in high class society. Mazie is a more working-class girl and she dates a reporter, Terry Kent. The film shows the women exercising, getting rub downs and lined up in steam baths. The women gossip and some women learn their husbands are cheating on them. Comedy is added when one customer brings in her dog and another woman has a pet monkey.

Mme. Helene is dating Dr. Stallings but after a long day, she calls off the date to go home and rest. At home she finds flowers and the hot shot and aggressive Pat Fenton waiting. He tells her the doctor is all wrong for her and asks does she really love Stallings. Pat takes her out on the town but ends up in a fist fight with his attorney. Helen flees the night club but the event makes the society news. Helen keeps rejecting Pat but is not sure if she and the doctor are the right fit.

Mrs. George Horton is a customer of the salon. Her husband has made advances toward Helen and one day Helen and George are in a car accident together. Helen assures Mrs. Horton that nothing is going on and that her husband loves her. She stays for a treatment only to hear the women gossip. She tries to commit suicide by drinking hair dye poison. Dr. Stallings saves her life and she reconciles with her husband. The doctor and Helen decide to split and Helen finds love with Pat.

== Cast ==
- Adrienne Ames as Helen "Mme. Helene" Smith
- Craig Reynolds as Pat Fenton
- Esther Ralston as Ruth De Milo
- George Meeker as Dr. Herbert Stallings
- Pert Kelton as Mazie Mason
- William Newell as Terry Kent
- Dorothy Vaughan as Mrs. Horton
- Edward Keane as George Horton
- Vivien Oakland as Mrs. Conway
- Ruth Gillette as Mme. Renault
- Dot Farley as Mrs. Willis
- Bonita Weber as Mrs. Richards
- Blanche Payson as Hilda
- Mary Field as Bessie, an attendant
- Louise Squire as Olga
- Fay McKenzie as Anna
- Harry Depp as Higginbotham
- Robert Homans as The Irish Policeman
