= Love Is Here to Stay =

1938 song by George and Ira Gershwin

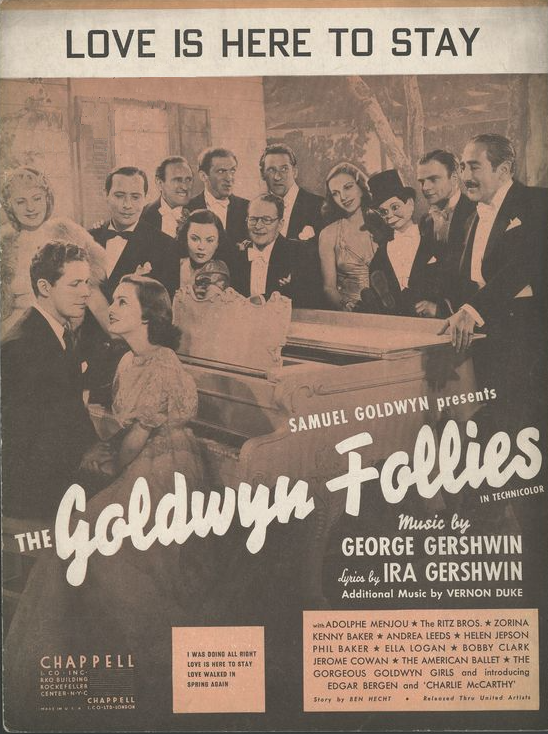
- Original cover of "Love Is Here to Stay"

Song
- Published: 1938 by Chappell & Co.
- Genre: Pop, jazz
- Composer: George Gershwin
- Lyricist: Ira Gershwin

"Love Is Here to Stay" is a popular song and jazz standard composed by George Gershwin with lyrics by Ira Gershwin for the movie The Goldwyn Follies (1938).

== History ==
"Love Is Here to Stay" was first performed by Kenny Baker in The Goldwyn Follies but became popular when it was sung by Gene Kelly to Leslie Caron in the film An American in Paris (1951); however, it was not included in the 2015 Broadway musical An American in Paris. The song appeared in Forget Paris (1995) and Manhattan (1979).

It can also be heard in the film When Harry Met Sally... (1989) sung by Harry Connick Jr.

An instrumental version of the song is sometimes heard in certain episodes of the American television sitcom The Honeymooners when Ralph Kramden apologizes to his wife Alice.

The song is also used in the musical The 1940's Radio Hour.

In June 2026, CBS News included the song in its list of the 250 essential American songs of the past 250 years.

== Composition ==
"Love Is Here to Stay" was the last musical composition George Gershwin completed before his death on July 11, 1937. Ira Gershwin wrote the lyrics after George's death as a tribute to his brother. Although George had not written a verse for the song, he did have an idea for it that both Ira and pianist Oscar Levant had heard before his death. When a verse was needed, Ira and Levant recalled what George had in mind. Composer Vernon Duke reconstructed the music for the verse at the beginning of the song. Originally titled "It's Here to Stay" and then "Our Love Is Here to Stay", the song was published as "Love Is Here to Stay". Ira Gershwin said that for years he wanted to change the song's name back to "Our Love Is Here to Stay", but he felt it wouldn't be right since the song had already become a standard.

== The Goldwyn Follies ==
Ira Gershwin recalled, "So little footage was given to 'Love Is Here to Stay' — I think only one refrain — that it meant little in The Goldwyn Follies." Oscar Levant remembers the producer for the film calling Gershwin into a conference one afternoon and insisting that he play the entire score for a panel of attendees. The experience infuriated George, who thought that he had progressed past this stage in his career as a composer. S. N. Behrman visited Gershwin a few days before he died and wrote that George told him, "I had to live for this — that Sam Goldwyn should say to me, 'Why don't you write hits like Irving Berlin?' "

== Other versions ==
- Red Norvo with Mildred Bailey – (1938)
- Nat 'King' Cole – Sings For Two In Love (1953)
- Dinah Washington – In the Land of Hi-Fi (1956)
- Frank Sinatra - Songs For Swingin' Lovers (1956)
- Ella Fitzgerald and Louis Armstrong – Ella and Louis Again (1957)
- Doris Day - Hooray for Hollywood (1958)
- Ella Fitzgerald – Ella Fitzgerald Sings the George and Ira Gershwin Songbook (1959)
- Billie Holiday – All or Nothing at All (1959)
- Chris Montez – Watch What Happens, and as a single (No. 38 on the Billboard Easy Listening chart in 1968)
- Michael Feinstein - Pure Gershwin (1987).
- Susannah McCorkle – Hearts and Minds (2000)

== See also ==
- List of 1930s jazz standards
