= Time Out for Rhythm =

1941 film by Sidney Salkow

- Directed by: Sidney Salkow
- Screenplay by: Edmund L. Hartmann; Bert Lawrence
- Story by: Bert Granet
- Based on: Show Business by Alex Ruben
- Produced by: Irving Starr
- Starring: Rudy Vallée; Ann Miller; Richard Lane; Rosemary Lane; Moe Howard; Larry Fine; Curly Howard; Joan Merrill; Richard Fiske
- Cinematography: Franz Planer
- Edited by: Art Seid
- Music by: Morris Stoloff (music score); Saul Chaplin; Sammy Cahn (music and lyrics)
- Production company: Columbia Pictures
- Distributed by: Columbia Pictures
- Release date: June 5, 1941
- Running time: 75 minutes
- Country: United States
- Language: English

Time Out for Rhythm is a 1941 American musical comedy film directed by Sidney Salkow and starring Rudy Vallée, Ann Miller and the Three Stooges (Moe Howard, Larry Fine, and Curly Howard). It was based on the stage musical Show Business by Alex Ruben. Six Hits and a Miss perform, as well as Glen Gray and His Casa Loma Orchestra, and Eduardo Durant's Rhumba Band, and with eight original songs by Saul Chaplin and Sammy Cahn.

== Plot ==
Harvard-educated Danny Collins (Rudy Vallée) and street-wise Mike Armstrong (Richard Lane) team up after a chance meeting to form the most successful talent agency in New York City. Mike is in love with nightclub and Broadway singer Frances Lewis (Rosemary Lane), determined to make her nationally famous with his and Danny's help. Danny sees her, correctly, as a self-centered opportunist willing to capitalize on Mike's affections to further her career.

Eventually, she causes Danny and Mike to split. Around the same time Danny and his assistant 'Off-Beat' Davis meet Frances' maid Kitty Brown (Ann Miller), a shy tap-dancing wonder, and try to find her work... but without Mike, their new agency cannot get going successfully. Mike is not having any luck on his own either, despite the fact he and Frances are now engaged to be married.

When Danny has the opportunity to produce a New York-based variety show with Kitty and Joan Merrill (as herself) as the headliners, he and Mike finally make amends when he needs Mike's help to seal the deal. But Frances blackmails Danny, threatening to break Mike's heart if she is not cast as the star of the show. Mike eventually learns about this and finally sees Frances for who she really is and leaves her. Mike moves forward, with Danny as his friend and business partner once again, to work on the show starring Kitty.

The film's musical finale begins with the Stooges (with help from co-stars Brenda and Cobrina) performing a hilarious rhumba dance number, with Curly Howard dressed up as Carmen Miranda.

== Cast ==
- Rudy Vallée as Daniel 'Danny' Collins
- Ann Miller as Kity Brown
- Rosemary Lane as Frances Lewis
- Allen Jenkins as Off-Beat Davis
- Joan Merrill as Joan
- Richard Lane as Mike Armstrong
- Stanley Andrews as James Anderson
- Moe Howard as Stooge Moe
- Larry Fine as Stooge Larry
- Curly Howard as Stooge Curly
- Blanche Stewart as Brenda
- Elvia Allman as Cobrina

== Production notes ==
The Three Stooges made appearances as out-of-work actors trying to find jobs through Danny's and Mike's agency. The Stooges provided most of the laughs as they appear throughout the movie. They showcased their famous "Maharaja" routine here for the first time, which later reused in their 1946 short subject Three Little Pirates as well as several other bits, including "Melodrama" routine from their era with Ted Healy which can also be seen at MGM-era short Plane Nuts (1933).

Alan Hale, Jr., best known for his role as The Skipper on Gilligan's Island, also makes a brief appearance, marking one of his first film appearances.

== Bibliography ==
- Fetrow, Alan G. Feature Films, 1940-1949: a United States Filmography. McFarland, 1994.

== Bibliography ==
- Goble, Alan. The Complete Index to Literary Sources in Film. Walter de Gruyter, 1999.
