= James Hilton =

James Hilton may refer to:

- James Hilton (academic) (born 1959), Vice Provost and University Librarian & Dean of Libraries at the University of Michigan
- James Hilton (designer) (born 1973), English designer
- James Hilton (novelist) (1900–1954), English novelist
- Jimmy Hilton (1883–1943), English rugby league footballer of the 1900s and 1910s
- James L. Hilton (born 1957), astronomer
