= Song of Idaho =

1948 film by Ray Nazarro

- Original title: Song of Idaho
- Directed by: Ray Nazarro
- Written by: Barry Shipman
- Produced by: Colbert Clark
- Starring: The Hoosier Hot Shots; Kirby Grant; June Vincent; Tommy Ivo; Dorothy Vaughan; Emory Parnell
- Cinematography: Vincent Farrar
- Edited by: Aaron Stell
- Music by: Mischa Bakaleinikoff
- Production company: Columbia Pictures Corporation
- Distributed by: Columbia Pictures (theatrical), Comet Video (DVD)
- Release date: March 20, 1948 (U.S.)
- Running time: 1:09:00
- Country: United States
- Language: English

Song of Idaho is a 1948 American Western musical film directed by Ray Nazarro. It was released by Columbia Pictures.

== Plot ==
King Russell (Kirby Grant) is a hillbilly singer whose show is canceled by its sponsor. The Hoosier Hot Shots and Russell must try to win over the sponsor's young son in order to get the sponsor to change his mind.

== Cast ==
- The Hoosier Hotshots as Musicians
  - Paul Trietsch as Hotshot Hezzie
  - Ken Trietsch as Hotshot Ken
  - Gil Taylor as Hotshot Gil
  - Charles Ward as Hotshot Gabe
- Kirby Grant as King Russell
- June Vincent as Eve Allen
- Tommy Ivo as Junior Nottingham
- Dorothy Vaughan as Sara Mom Russell
- Emory Parnell as J. Chester Nottingham
- The Sunshine Boys as Musicians
- The Sunshine Girls as Singing Trio
- The Starlighters as Singing Quintet

== Music ==
The film features the musical quartet Hoosier Hot Shots (Paul Trietsch, Ken Trietsch, Gil Taylor, Charles Ward) who also star as actors. The Sunshine Boys also provide music, and the Sunshine Girls and the Starlighters sing.

Songs performed in Song of Idaho include:

- "Idaho, Here We Come"
- "I'm Sorry I Didn't Say I'm Sorry"
- ""Rocky Mountain Express"
- "Here Comes The Cheer Parade"
- "Idaho"
- "Driftin'"
- "Nobody Else but You"
- "Rhythm of the River"
- "Sippin' Cider by the Zuyder Zee"
- "When the Lightning Struck Coon Creek"
