= The Mayor of 44th Street =

1942 film by Alfred E. Green

- Directed by: Alfred E. Green
- Screenplay by: Lewis R. Foster; Frank Ryan
- Story by: Robert Hardy Andrews
- Based on: The Mayor of 44th Street; 1940 story in Collier's by John Cleveland and Luther Davis
- Produced by: Cliff Reid
- Starring: George Murphy
- Cinematography: Robert De Grasse
- Edited by: Irene Morra
- Music by: C. Bakaleinikoff
- Distributed by: RKO Pictures
- Release date: May 15, 1942 (U.S.)
- Running time: 86 minutes
- Country: United States
- Language: English

The Mayor of 44th Street is a 1942 musical romantic comedy film directed by Alfred E. Green. It stars George Murphy and Anne Shirley. The song There's a Breeze on Lake Louise was nominated for an Academy Award in 1943.

== Plot ==
George Murphy is a reformed crook who has made a success as a booking agent for big bands at supper clubs. Richard Barthelmess is his ex-partner who is up for parole and needs the promise of a job to get out of prison. George volunteers to help out and offers him a place at his agency.

Before long, Richard has returned to his old ways and is pushing “ protection “ to the bands they represent. When Murphy finds out, he immediately cans the crook.

A spree of violence ensues as the criminal gang ups the ante. Barthelmess turns up the pressure on Murphy and torches his best club. Murphy gets a gun and goes to settle the score but he’s outsmarted. Murphy is being beaten by Barthelmess’ gang when a crowd of ordinary citizens arrive and save the day.

== Cast ==
- George Murphy as Joe Jonathan
- Anne Shirley as Jessey Lee
- William Gargan as Tommy Fallon
- Richard Barthelmess as Ed Kirby—Barthelmess's last film before he retired from acting
- Joan Merrill as Vicky Lane
- Freddy Martin as himself
- Rex Downing as Bits McKarg
- Millard Mitchell as Herman
- Mary Wickes as Mamie
