= Time After Time (Chris Montez album) =

Studio album by Chris Montez
- Released: December 1966
- Genres: Pop; Easy listening
- Label: A&M
- Producers: Herb Alpert; Marshal Leib; Tommy LiPuma

Chris Montez chronology
The More I See You (1966)	Time After Time (1966)	Foolin' Around (1967)

Singles from Time After Time
- 1. "Time After Time" Released: October 1966

Time After Time is a studio album by American pop singer Chris Montez. It was released in December 1966 via A&M and was the third studio album of his career. Time After Time contained 12 tracks, including the lead single "Time After Time". It reached the top-15 of the US Billboard Easy Listening chart, and was his final top-40 single on the Billboard Hot 100. The album received positive reviews from several contemporary publications and reached the charts.

== Recording and release ==
The songs for Time After Time were recorded in late 1966 under three producers, Marshal Leib, Tommy LiPuma, and the label's founder Herb Alpert. Arrangements were provided by Nick DeCaro. Time After Time was originally released in December 1966 by A&M, the label's only album released in early December. It was the third studio album of Montez's career, and also the second of the year. The label originally offered it as a vinyl LP, with six songs on "Side A" and six songs on "Side B". Decades later, the album was re-released for streaming to digital sites.

== Reception ==
Professional ratings
Review scores
Source	Rating
AllMusic	3/5 stars
The Encyclopedia of Popular Music	3/5 stars

The album received several positive reviews upon its release. Record World highlighted Montez's "bubbly ginger ale voice", noting his "contemporary approach" to standards and "the right approach" to newer songs. Billboard magazine believed that "proven successful in updating standards, Montez has another sure fire programming and sales winner in this well done album," adding that Montez's original "Elena" is "another standout". The retrospective by Joe Viglione on AllMusic called it "more intriguing and listenable than one might think," saying that "When Montez is on, as he is when taking Dinah Washington's "What a Difference a Day Makes", he is exquisite, [...] When he is off, on display with the pointless rendition of Blackwell's "Lil' Red Riding Hood, [...] one can see how the formula Herb Alpert devised had its limitations."

== Chart performance and singles ==
Time After Time successfully reached the US pop album charts, though its presence on them varied. It debuted on Billboard magazine's Top LP's chart in the issue dated January 14, 1967, peaking at No. 106 during an eleven-week run on the chart. The album entered Cashbox magazine's Top 100 Albums chart in the issue also dated December 17, 1966, peaking at No. 65 during a ten-week run on it. Time After Time entered the Record World Top 100 LP's chart in the December 24, 1966 issue, peaking at No. 80 during a six-week run on it.

One lead single was included on Time After Time. The title track "Time After Time" was first released by A&M as a single in October 1966. It became a top-15 single on America's Billboard Easy Listening chart, rising to the number 12 position. The single became another pop hit for Montez as well, reaching the top-40 on the US Billboard Hot 100 at number 36, and the top-20 on the Canadian RPM Top 100 Singles at number 17.

== Track listing ==
Side one
No.	Title	Writer(s)	Length
1.	"Time After Time"	Jule Styne; Sammy Cahn	2:18
2.	"I Wish You Love"	Charles Trenet; Albert Beach	2:05
3.	"Sunny"	Bobby Hebb	2:45
4.	"Keep Talkin'"	Donato; Crystal	2:30
5.	"Our Day Will Come"	Mort Garson; Bob Hilliard	2:47
6.	"The Girl from Ipanema"	Antônio Carlos Jobim; Vinicius de Moraes; Norman Gimbel	2:40

Side two
No.	Title	Writer(s)	Length
1.	"Lil' Red Riding Hood"	Ronald Blackwell	3:36
2.	"Going Out of My Head"	Teddy Randazzo; Bobby Weinstein	2:38
3.	"What a Diff'rence a Day Made"	María Grever; Stanley Adams	2:07
4.	"Elena"	Chris Montez	2:10
5.	"Yesterday"	Lennon–McCartney	2:30
6.	"Just Friends"	John Klenner; Sam M. Lewis	2:30

== Charts ==
Chart performance for Time After Time
Chart (1966-1967)	Peak position
US Billboard Top LP's	106
US Cashbox Top 100 Albums	65
US Record World 100 Top LP's	80

== Personnel ==
All credits are adapted from the liner notes of Time After Time.

- Herb Alpert & Tommy LiPuma (tracks: A1) – producer
- Tommy LiPuma (tracks: A2 to B3; B5 to B6) – producer
- Marshal Leib (tracks: B4) – producer
- Bruce Botnick – recording engineer
- Nick DeCaro – arranger and conductor
- Peter Whorf Graphics – design
- Jack Carney – liner notes
- Chris Montez – lead vocals
