= Pauline Byrns =

American singer (1917–1990)

Pauline Byrns (May 6, 1917 – September 18, 1990) was an American singer who recorded successfully in the swing era of the late 1930s and 1940s, notably with Artie Shaw and the vocal groups Six Hits and a Miss and The Starlighters. She was often credited as Pauline Byrne or Pauline Byrnes. Singer Mel Tormé said of her: "Oh, what a singer.... I admired her so much".

She was born in Missouri. At the age of 17 she won a talent contest in Washington, and began singing and touring with big bands. In 1937 she moved to California and joined the singing group Three Hits and a Miss to replace Martha Tilton. As the group changed personnel, so its name changed, later recording as Six Hits and a Miss; the group's other members included Vince Degen, her husband Jerry Preshaw, Howard Hudson - later her second husband - and Tony Paris. In 1938, Byrne was described by the magazine Records and Recording as "one of the finest vocalists to grace a bit of waxed jazz in some years. Her voice is a rich contralto, best in the lower register..." The group recorded with Bing Crosby, appeared in several movies in the early 1940s, including the Marx Brothers film The Big Store, and performed regularly on the Bob Hope Show on radio. The version of Cole Porter's "You'd Be So Nice to Come Home To" by Six Hits and a Miss made no. 11 on the US charts in 1943.

She also recorded "Lullaby of Broadway" as a featured vocalist with the David Rose Orchestra, and in 1940 recorded "Gloomy Sunday" and "Don't Fall Asleep" with the Artie Shaw Orchestra. She formed another vocal group, The Starlighters, with Hudson, Degen and Paris, in 1946; an early member of the group was Andy Williams. The Starlighters (unconnected to other groups of that name) recorded successfully for several labels in the late 1940s and early 1950s, including some records with Jo Stafford. However, Byrns left the group in 1947, after giving birth to her first child.

Thereafter she retired from the music business. In later years she lived in Encino and then Tarzana with her husband, Howard G. Hudson. She died of cancer in Sherman Oaks, Los Angeles at the age of 73.
