= The Starlighters =

Singing group of the mid 20th century

The Starlighters, with Jo Stafford (left)

The Starlighters were an American vocal group in the 1940s and 1950s, formed in 1946. The original members were Pauline Byrns, Vince Degen, Tony Paris, Howard Hudson (who all performed the song "It's The Same Old Dream" with Frank Sinatra in the 1947 musical It Happened in Brooklyn), and Andy Williams, who continued on in subsequent decades with a famous musical career and hosting a variety television show of his own. All were alumni of Six Hits and a Miss. Williams soon left and was replaced by Jerry Duane. Byrns retired from singing in 1947. Imogene Lynn became the lead female vocalist in 1949, replacing Byrns.

The group performed mainly as backing vocalists, frequently backing singer Jo Stafford in several songs as well as on her television variety show The Jo Stafford Show. They also performed songs in cartoon and live short films, as well as feature films such as It Happened in Brooklyn (1947), Song of Idaho (1948), Honeychile (1951) and With a Song in My Heart (1952). The Starlighters also appeared on radio shows such as The Chesterfield Supper Club (1944–1950 on NBC Radio and 1948–1950 on NBC).
