= Because of You (1940 song) =

1940 song popularized by Tony Bennett in 1951

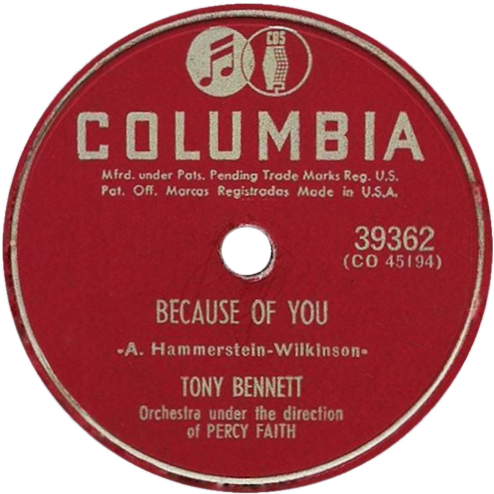
- 78 rpm record

Single by Tony Bennett

from the album Because of You
- B-side: "I Won't Cry Anymore"
- Published: September 4, 1940 by Broadcast Music, Inc., New York
- Released: April 30, 1951
- Recorded: April 4, 1951
- Studio: Columbia 30th Street Studio, New York City
- Genre: Popular music
- Length: 2:59
- Label: Columbia
- Songwriters: Arthur Hammerstein, Dudley Wilkinson

Tony Bennett singles chronology
"Boulevard of Broken Dreams" (1950)	"Because of You" (1951)	"Cold, Cold Heart" (1951)

"Because of You" is a popular song written by Arthur Hammerstein and Dudley Wilkinson in 1940. It was first recorded by Larry Clinton and His Orchestra on December 12, 1940, and was released March 28, 1941 on Bluebird 11094. It charted for one week (June 28) and ranked number 95 in the 1941 year-end list.

It was used in the 1951 film I Was an American Spy.

== Tony Bennett recording ==
A 1951 recording by Tony Bennett, Columbia Records catalog number 39362, recorded on April 4, 1951 with orchestral backing conducted by Percy Faith, was Bennett’s first major hit, reaching number one on the Billboard charts and staying there for 10 weeks. It eventually sold over 1 million copies. Due to its importance in establishing his fame, he continued to perform the song for the rest of his career, even singing it at his final concert performances 70 years after its release. It was one of the last songs rehearsed at his piano before he died.

== Chis Montez recording ==
In 1967, a live recording was made by Chris Montez, whose version peaked at number 25 on the Easy Listening chart. It also became his final entry on the Billboard Hot 100, at number 71. The track was later featured on his album Foolin' Around, released a few months later.

== Notable cover versions ==
In 1951, there were several artists covering the song:

- A cover version by Johnny Desmond reached number seventeen at the same time as the Bennett recording.
- Tab Smith released an R&B instrumental version which was number one on the R&B chart and number 20 on the pop chart.
- In 1967, a soulful version of the song was recorded by Peaches & Herb for their album Let's Fall In Love on Date Records a subsidiary of Columbia Records.

== See also ==
- List of number-one singles of 1951 (U.S.)
- List of number-one rhythm and blues hits (United States)
- List of number-one singles in Australia during the 1950s
