= The More I See You (Chris Montez album) =

Studio album by Chris Montez
- Released: June 1966
- Studio: Gold Star Recording Studio
- Genres: Pop; Easy listening
- Label: A&M
- Producers: Herb Alpert; Tommy LiPuma

Chris Montez chronology
Let's Dance and Have Some Fun!!! (1963)	The More I See You (1966)	Time After Time (1966)

Singles from The More I See You
- 1. "Call Me" Released: November 1965; 2. "The More I See You" Released: March 1966; 3. "There Will Never Be Another You" Released: August 1966

The More I See You, also called The More I See You/Call Me, is a studio album by American pop singer Chris Montez. It was released in mid 1966 via A&M and was the second studio album of his career. The More I See You contained 12 tracks, including three singles " Call Me," "The More I See You," and "There Will Never Be Another You". All of the releases reached the top-5 of the US Billboard Easy Listening chart, and the top-40 on the Billboard pop-oriented Hot 100. The album received positive reviews from several contemporary publications and reached the top-40 on the LP and cartridge tape charts.

== Background and content ==
Rock 'n' roll singer Chris Montez first broke out in the recording industry in 1962 with his single "Let's Dance", which managed to reach the top-10 in the US and the UK. After the relative failure of his next singles, he was signed by A&M Records, as the label was looking for new artists, as they only had a few major commercial bands. It's Herb Alpert helped Montez pick out songs, mostly older standards, which Montez liked, and there on Montez recorded songs in an easy listening style. These featured show tunes such as "How High the Moon" and often recorded songs like "Little White Lies", "Day by Day", and "The Very Thought of You".

== Recording and release ==
The songs for The More I See You were recorded in 1965 and 1966 at Gold Star Recording Studio under two producers, Tommy LiPuma and the label's founder Herb Alpert. Arrangements were provided by Alpert as well. The More I See You was originally released in June 1966 by A&M, the label's only album released in early June. It was the second studio album of Montez's career, and also the first of the year. That summer, A&M also issued it in 4-track and 8-track cartridge formats. The label originally offered it as a vinyl LP, with six songs on "Side A" and six songs on "Side B". Decades later in 2015, the album was re-released for streaming to digital sites.

== Critical reception ==
Professional ratings
Review scores
Source	Rating
AllMusic	3/5 stars
The Encyclopedia of Popular Music	3/5 stars

=== Contemporary reception ===
The album received several positive reviews upon its release. Record World highlighted Montez's "light and airy summery voice" after putting the album in their "Albums of the Week" section. Billboard magazine stated that it was a "Well produced package by Herb Alpert and Tommy LiPuma." Cashbox magazine believed that it "should become a hot item on the LP chart in no time," adding that "Montez adds a host of good sounds to the pair of hits with his readings of such tunes."

=== Retrospectives ===
The retrospective by Joe Viglione on AllMusic called it "Classic pop," saying that Montez's original "You, I Love You" is a "pleasant album track that flows nicely along with the other tunes." Viglione also stated that "There is only one formula at play here, and A&M milks it for all it is worth: It's in Herb Alpert's arranging a rendition of Bruce Channel's 1962 smash "Hey! Baby." The Encyclopedia of Popular Music gave the album a three-star rating, which meant that they recommended the album and that it was "good by the artist's usual standards".

== Chart performance and singles ==
The More I See You successfully reached the US pop album charts, though its presence on them varied. It debuted on Billboard magazine's Top LP's chart in the issue dated July 2, 1966, peaking at No. 33 during an twenty-four-week run on the chart. The album entered Cashbox magazine's Top 100 Albums chart in the issue also dated July 2, 1966, peaking at No. 20 during a fiftteen-week run on it. The More I See You entered the Record World Top 100 LP's chart in the July 2, 1966 issue, peaking at No. 14 during a sixteen-week run on it. Record World also published tape cartridge-oriented charts; the album performed much better on them reaching the top 5.

Three singles were included on The More I See You. The first was Montez's debut on the A&MB label, "Call Me", backed by a Montez original "You, I Love You". It became a top-5 single on America's Billboard Easy Listening chart, rising to the number 2 position. The single became another big pop hit for Montez as well, reaching the top-40 on the US Billboard Hot 100 at number 22. The title track was released in March 1966, also climbing to No. 2 on the Easy Listening chart, but performing better on the Hot 100 with a peak of No. 16. Lastly, "There Will Never Be Another You" was taken from the album and released as a single in August 1966. "There Will Never Be Another You" reached No. 4 and No. 33 on the charts, respectively.

== Track listing ==
Side one
No.	Title	Writer(s)	Length
1.	"The More I See You"	Harry Warren; Mack Gordon	2:45
2.	"Fly Me to the Moon"	Bart Howard	2:47
3.	"The Shadow of Your Smile"	Johnny Mandel; Paul Francis Webster	2:21
4.	"The Very Thought of You"	Ray Noble	2:05
5.	"One Note Samba"	Antônio Carlos Jobim; Newton Mendonça	2:07
6.	"There Will Never Be Another You"	Harry Warren; Mack Gordon	2:51
Total length:			14:56

Side two
No.	Title	Writer(s)	Length
1.	"Call Me"	Tony Hatch	2:38
2.	"Day by Day"	Axel Stordahl; Paul Weston; Sammy Cahn	2:16
3.	"How High the Moon"	Morgan Lewis; Nancy Hamilton	1:48
4.	"Hey Baby"	Bruce Channel; Margaret Cobb	2:42
5.	"You, I Love You"	Chris Montez	2:07
6.	"Little White Lies"	Walter Donaldson	2:02
Total length:			13:33

== Charts ==
Chart performance for The More I See You
Chart (1966)	Peak position
US Billboard Top LP's	33
US Cashbox Top 100 Albums	20
US Record World 100 Top LP's	14
US Record World Best-Selling Tape Cartridges-8 track	3
US Record World Best-Selling Tape Cartridges-4 track	4

== Personnel ==
All credits are adapted from the liner notes of The More I See You.

- Herb Alpert (tracks: A1; B1; B4) – producer
- Tommy LiPuma (tracks: A2 to A6; B2 to B3; B5 to B6) – producer
- Larry Levine – engineer
- Herb Alpert – arranger
- Peter Whorf Graphics – design
- Derek Taylor – liner notes
- Chris Montez – lead vocals
