= American music during World War II =

During World War II, American music helped to inspire servicemen, people working in the war industries, homemakers and schoolchildren alike.

American music during World War II was considered to be popular music that was enjoyed during the late 1930s (the end of the Great Depression) through the mid-1940s (through the end of World War II).

== Radio and accessibility ==
By 1940, 80% of American households would own a radio; making American music far more accessible to civilians and soldiers alike. Although the radio could be used to boost American morale, the American Government censored radio channels in fear that enemy agents may be sending coded messages through song requests on the stations.

== Popular songs ==
Unlike many World War I songs, many World War II songs focused more on romance and strength instead of propaganda, morale, and patriotism. Songs that were overly patriotic or militaristic were often rejected by the public.

Popular singers of the era included Frank Sinatra, Ella Fitzgerald, the Andrews Sisters and Bing Crosby. Notable wartime radio songs were "Boogie Woogie Bugle Boy", "Shoo-Shoo Baby", "I'm Making Believe", "I'll Be Seeing You", and "I'll Be Home for Christmas".

Songs that ridiculed the Axis Powers were also popular. These songs include "We'll Knock the Japs Right into the Laps of the Nazis", "Yankee Doodle Ain't Doodlin' Now", "You're a Sap, Mr. Jap", and Oliver Wallace's song "Der Fuehrer's Face", popularly recorded by Spike Jones, itself inspiring a 1943 Walt Disney cartoon starring the fictional character Donald Duck. A notable trend with songs that targeted the Axis powers was that for the songs directed towards Europe, the songs focused on Hitler and the Nazis as opposed to the civilians. On the other hand, songs that were directed towards the Pacific showed blatant racism, hate, anger, and revenge following the Pearl Harbor attack.

== Swing music ==
Swing music was a notable example of wartime radio music. Even Nazi Germany fielded some swing music bands despite Hitler's objections to "decadent Western music." After the end of World War II, this music escalated until the paranoia of the Cold War made this kind of music irrelevant after the Soviet menace (under Joseph Stalin) replaced the Nazi menace (under Adolf Hitler). Lawrence Welk would later play this kind of music on The Lawrence Welk Show. Jazz music would also become part of the "cultural war" that raged alongside the actual fighting of World War II. Having its roots in African-American music, the Nazi regime had declared it to be "inhuman music" and banned it in all of occupied Europe. The local musicians of Paris, France chose to play jazz music in French rather than in English as a loophole in the Nazi jazz music ban. Rebellious German kids would meet in secret locations and listen to Allied music stations to hear jazz music behind the Gestapo's metaphorical back. This generation of German kids saw jazz music as a "religion worth fighting for."
