= Six Hits and a Miss =

American swing-era singing group

- Origin: Los Angeles, California, U.S.A.
- Genres: Vocal jazz, pop
- Label: Decca
- Past members: Andy Williams; Bill Seckler; Howard Hudson; Jerry Duane; Jerry Preshaw; Lee Gotch; Mack McLean; Martha Tilton; Marvin Bailey; Pauline Byrns; Tony Paris; Vince Degen

Six Hits and a Miss was an American swing-era singing group. The group consisted of six male singers and one female (thus the word "miss" in their name has a double meaning – the converse of the word "hit", and denotation of a young woman). They performed musical numbers in several Hollywood feature films of the 1940s, such as If I Had My Way (1940), Time Out for Rhythm (1941), The Big Store (1941), Hit Parade of 1941 (1941), and Girl Crazy (1943).

The group was formed in Los Angeles, California in 1936 as a foursome, under the name Three Hits and a Miss, the members being Martha Tilton, Vince Degen, Marvin Bailey and Bill Seckler. In this configuration they appeared in the 1937 hit film Topper, singing Hoagy Carmichael's song, "Old Man Moon". The quartet also performed on actress/comedienne Charlotte Greenwood’s situation comedy program, The Charlotte Greenwood Show on radio broadcasts in the mid-1940s on the NBC Blue Network in the summer of 1944 and 1945-1946 after the network was forced to reorganize as the American Broadcasting Company.

The group soon expanded to a septet. Members came and went, particularly due to wartime service, and included at various times Pauline Byrns, Howard Hudson, Tony Paris, Marvin Bailey, Jerry Preshaw, Lee Gotch, and Mack McLean. They were regulars on The Pepsodent Show Starring Bob Hope in the late 1930s and early 1940s, and recorded as backup singers for Judy Garland, Jimmy Durante, and Bing Crosby, whom they backed on his 1944 recording of "On the Atchison, Topeka and the Santa Fe" (later the theme song from the 1946 Western film, The Harvey Girls, starring Judy Garland). The recording reached the Billboard charts on July 19, 1945, and lasted ten weeks on the chart, peaking at number four. They reached No. 11 or No. 16 on their own in 1943 with Cole Porter's "You'd Be So Nice to Come Home To".

The group shrank to Four Hits and a Miss. This configuration briefly included a young Andy Williams. Under this name, they worked with Frank Sinatra and recorded into the late 1940s on the Decca label. They also recorded singles on their own for Exclusive Records in 1947 and for Crystal Records in 1950. At Decca from 1949 to 1952 they supported Evelyn Knight, Ella Fitzgerald, Al Jolson and Dick Haymes on record. At one point they were also part of Haymes radio show.

The Bing Crosby association was renewed when they were the vocal chorus on “Misto Cristofo Columbo” in Here Comes the Groom. They followed this up on June 20th, 1951 when they accompanied Bing and Jane Wyman on “In the Cool, Cool, Cool of the Evening” and “Misto Cristofo Columbo” with support from Matty Matlock’s All Stars.

Alumni Vince Degen, Tony Paris, Howard Hudson, Pauline Byrns and Andy Williams (soon replaced by Jerry Duane) went on to form The Starlighters in 1946, continuing into the 1950s.

Six Hits and a Miss is also the name of a 1942 musical short film in which the group appeared. Personnel at that time were Pauline Byrns, Marvin Bailey, Vince Degen, Lee Gotch, Mack McLean, Tony Paris and Bill Seckler.
