= Call Me (Petula Clark song) =

EP by Petula Clark
- Released: November 1965
- Recorded: 1965, London, UK
- Genre: Pop
- Length: 9:06
- Language: English
- Labels: Pye Records NEP 24237 (UK); Vogue CPV 8343 (France)
- Producer: Tony Hatch

"Call Me" is a song composed by Tony Hatch for an original recording for Petula Clark. It was later an easy listening standard via a hit version by Chris Montez.

"Call Me" first appeared as the title cut on a Petula Clark EP released in 1965 by Pye in the UK. "Call Me" and the three other tracks on the EP: "Heart", "Everything in the Garden" and "Strangers and Lovers" were also released on Clark's album I Know a Place (a.k.a. The New Petula Clark Album).

== Track listing ==
Side One

1. "Call Me" (Tony Hatch) - 2:43
2. "Heart"
  (Tony Hatch-Petula Clark-George Aber) - 2:37

Side Two

1. "Everything in the Garden"
  (Roger Greenaway) - 2:55
2. "Strangers and Lovers (Tony Hatch) - 2:51

== Charts and certifications ==
=== Weekly charts ===
Chart (1966)	Peak Position
Argentina (Billboard )	7

== Chris Montez version ==
"Call Me"

Single by Chris Montez

from the album The More I See You/Call Me
- B-side: "Go Head On"
- Released: November 1965
- Recorded: September 22, 1965
- Studio: Gold Star Recording Studios
- Genre: Easy listening
- Length: 2:33
- Label: A&M
- Songwriter: Tony Hatch
- Producer: Herb Alpert

Chris Montez singles chronology
"All You Had to Do is Tell Me" (1964)	"Call Me" (1965)	"The More I See You" (1966)

Also in 1965 Chris Montez, who had scored the hit "Let's Dance" in 1962 and subsequently dropped out of the music business, was invited to resume recording by A&M Records' founder Herb Alpert. Alpert was unhappy when Montez began recording for A&M in his previous Chicano rock style and personally suggested Montez shift to easy listening choosing "Call Me" as the song to be Montez's debut single on A&M. Recorded in September 1965 and released in November, "Call Me" entered the Easy Listening Top 40 in Billboard that December entering the Billboard Hot 100 in January 1966; that March "Call Me" peaked on the Easy Listening chart at #2 and on the Hot 100 at #22.

Montez's version of "Call Me" was released as a single in the UK on the Pye label in January 1966 but failed to chart.

=== Chart performance ===
Chart (1965–66)	Peak position
Canada RPM Playlist	8
US Billboard Hot 100	22
US Billboard Easy Listening	2

== Other versions ==
- Frank Sinatra covered the song on his 1966 album Strangers in the Night.
- A version of "Call Me" was recorded by soul band, The Foundations. It appeared on their 1967 album From the Foundations.
- In the 1989 rom-com When Harry Met Sally, Billy Crystal's Harry Burns character leaves a voice message with a rendition from the song.
- A version of the song by the easy listening group The Mike Flowers Pops is on the soundtrack of the 1997 film Austin Powers: International Man of Mystery.
- Eliane Elias included the song in her 2004 studio album Dreamer.

NANCY AMES "Latin Pulse" ( dimelo ) sung in Spanish.
