= Larry Marks =

Larry Marks may refer to:

- Larry Marks (American football) (1902–1974), American player in the National Football League
- Larry Marks (boxer) (born 1972), American professional boxer

== See also ==
- Larry Markes (1921–1999), American comedian, singer and screenwriter
