= Time After Time (1947 song) =

1947 song by Sammy Cahn and Jule Styne

Song
- Published: 1947 by Barton Music
- Composer: Jule Styne
- Lyricist: Sammy Cahn

"Time After Time" is a romantic jazz standard with lyrics written by Sammy Cahn and music by Jule Styne in 1946.

== First recordings ==
The first recording was on November 19, 1946 for Musicraft by Sarah Vaughan with the Teddy Wilson Quartet: Wilson on piano, Charlie Ventura on tenor saxophone, Remo Palmieri on guitar, and Billy Taylor on double bass.

The song was written for Frank Sinatra to introduce in the 1947 MGM film It Happened in Brooklyn. The pianist providing the offscreen accompaniment was André Previn to an arrangement of Axel Stordahl. Later in the film, the song was reprised in full by Kathryn Grayson.

Margaret Whiting released her version in March 1947 as the B-side to her single "Spring Isn't Everything". The song was later included on her 1966 compilation album, The Wheel of Hurt. It was featured in the film Julie & Julia, which gave it a small resurgence of fame.

Sinatra recorded it again in 1957 with the Nelson Riddle Orchestra. After it emerged as a jazz standard thanks to saxophonists like Getz and Coltrane, 1959 was a banner year for its popularity, being covered by many pop and jazz vocalists.

== Other versions ==
- Chet Baker, Chet Baker Sings, 1954
- Anita O'Day, This Is Anita (1955)
- Frank Sinatra, This Is Sinatra Volume 2, 1957
- Connie Francis, The Exciting Connie Francis 1959
- Dinah Washington, What a Diff'rence a Day Makes!, 1959
- Joe Morello with Phil Woods and Gary Burton, It's About Time, 1961
- Nancy Wilson, Gentle Is My Love, 1965
- Ella Fitzgerald, Whisper Not, 1966
- Chris Montez, Time After Time, 1966 (No. 17 CAN, No. 36 US)
- Dusty Springfield, Where Am I Going?(1998 CD release, but not on the original album in 1967), 1967 (she also sang it live on her BBC-TV show the same year)
- Jacky Terrasson, self-titled album, 1994.
- Etta James, Time After Time (Etta James album), 1995.
- She & Him, Classics, 2014
- Fujii Kaze, Help Ever Hurt Cover, 2020
