= James L. Hilton =

American astronomer

James Lindsay Hilton (born February 21, 1957) has been an astronomer at the United States Naval Observatory since 1986. In 1999 he published a new set of ephemerides for 15 of the largest asteroids for use in the Astronomical Almanac.

== Education ==
Hilton earned his B.A. in physics from Rice University in 1979. He did his graduate studies at the University of Texas at Austin where he earned an M.A. in astronomy in 1981 and a Ph.D. in astronomy in 1990.
