= List of Billboard number-one singles of 1951 =

This is a list of number-one songs in the United States during the year 1951 according to Billboard magazine. Prior to the creation of the Billboard Hot 100, Billboard published multiple singles charts each week. In 1951, the following four charts were produced:

- Best Sellers in Stores – ranked the biggest selling singles in retail stores, as reported by merchants surveyed throughout the country.
- Most Played by Jockeys – ranked the most played songs on United States radio stations, as reported by radio disc jockeys and radio stations.
- Most Played in Jukeboxes – ranked the most played songs in jukeboxes across the United States.
- Honor Roll of Hits – a composite ten-position song chart which combined data from the three charts above along with three other component charts. It served as The Billboard's lead chart until the introduction of the Hot 100 in 1958 and would remain in print until 1963.

Issue date	Best Sellers in Stores	Most Played by Jockeys	Most Played in Jukeboxes	Honor Roll of Hits	Ref.
January 6	"The Tennessee Waltz"; Patti Page with Orchestra conducted by Jack Rael	"The Tennessee Waltz"; Patti Page with Orchestra conducted by Jack Rael	"The Tennessee Waltz"; Patti Page with Orchestra conducted by Jack Rael	"Tennessee Waltz"	
January 13	"The Tennessee Waltz"; Patti Page with Orchestra conducted by Jack Rael	"The Tennessee Waltz"; Patti Page with Orchestra conducted by Jack Rael	"The Tennessee Waltz"; Patti Page with Orchestra conducted by Jack Rael	"Tennessee Waltz"	
January 20	"The Tennessee Waltz"; Patti Page with Orchestra conducted by Jack Rael	"The Tennessee Waltz"; Patti Page with Orchestra conducted by Jack Rael	"The Tennessee Waltz"; Patti Page with Orchestra conducted by Jack Rael	"Tennessee Waltz"	
January 27	"The Tennessee Waltz"; Patti Page with Orchestra conducted by Jack Rael	"The Tennessee Waltz"; Patti Page with Orchestra conducted by Jack Rael	"The Tennessee Waltz"; Patti Page with Orchestra conducted by Jack Rael	"Tennessee Waltz"	
February 3	"The Tennessee Waltz"; Patti Page with Orchestra conducted by Jack Rael	"The Tennessee Waltz"; Patti Page with Orchestra conducted by Jack Rael	"The Tennessee Waltz"; Patti Page with Orchestra conducted by Jack Rael	"Tennessee Waltz"	
February 10	"The Tennessee Waltz"; Patti Page with Orchestra conducted by Jack Rael	"The Tennessee Waltz"; Patti Page with Orchestra conducted by Jack Rael	"The Tennessee Waltz"; Patti Page with Orchestra conducted by Jack Rael	"Tennessee Waltz"	
February 17	"The Tennessee Waltz"; Patti Page with Orchestra conducted by Jack Rael	"The Tennessee Waltz"; Patti Page with Orchestra conducted by Jack Rael	"The Tennessee Waltz"; Patti Page with Orchestra conducted by Jack Rael	"Tennessee Waltz"	
February 24	"The Tennessee Waltz"; Patti Page with Orchestra conducted by Jack Rael	"The Tennessee Waltz"; Patti Page with Orchestra conducted by Jack Rael	"The Tennessee Waltz"; Patti Page with Orchestra conducted by Jack Rael	"Tennessee Waltz"	
March 3	"If"; Perry Como with Mitchell Ayres and his Orchestra	"If"; Perry Como with Mitchell Ayres and his Orchestra	"The Tennessee Waltz"; Patti Page with Orchestra conducted by Jack Rael	"Tennessee Waltz"	
March 10	"Be My Love"; Mario Lanza with orchestra conducted by Ray Sinatra and the Jeff Alexander Choir	"If"; Perry Como with Mitchell Ayres and his Orchestra	"The Tennessee Waltz"; Patti Page with Orchestra conducted by Jack Rael	"If"	
March 17	"If"; Perry Como with Mitchell Ayres and his Orchestra	"If"; Perry Como with Mitchell Ayres and his Orchestra	"The Tennessee Waltz"; Patti Page with Orchestra conducted by Jack Rael	"If"	
March 24	"If"; Perry Como with Mitchell Ayres and his Orchestra	"If"; Perry Como with Mitchell Ayres and his Orchestra	"The Tennessee Waltz"; Patti Page with Orchestra conducted by Jack Rael	"If"	
March 31	"If"; Perry Como with Mitchell Ayres and his Orchestra	"If"; Perry Como with Mitchell Ayres and his Orchestra	"If"; Perry Como with Mitchell Ayres and his Orchestra	"If"	
April 7	"If"; Perry Como with Mitchell Ayres and his Orchestra	"If"; Perry Como with Mitchell Ayres and his Orchestra	"If"; Perry Como with Mitchell Ayres and his Orchestra	"If"	
April 14	"If"; Perry Como with Mitchell Ayres and his Orchestra	"If"; Perry Como with Mitchell Ayres and his Orchestra	"If"; Perry Como with Mitchell Ayres and his Orchestra	"Mockin' Bird Hill"	
April 21	"How High the Moon"; Les Paul and Mary Ford	"If"; Perry Como with Mitchell Ayres and his Orchestra	"If"; Perry Como with Mitchell Ayres and his Orchestra	"Mockin' Bird Hill"	
April 28	"How High the Moon"; Les Paul and Mary Ford	"How High the Moon"; Les Paul and Mary Ford	"If"; Perry Como with Mitchell Ayres and his Orchestra	"Mockin' Bird Hill"	
May 5	"How High the Moon"; Les Paul and Mary Ford	"How High the Moon"; Les Paul and Mary Ford	"How High the Moon"; Les Paul and Mary Ford	"Mockin' Bird Hill"	
May 12	"How High the Moon"; Les Paul and Mary Ford	"How High the Moon"; Les Paul and Mary Ford	"How High the Moon"; Les Paul and Mary Ford	"Mockin' Bird Hill"	
May 19	"How High the Moon"; Les Paul and Mary Ford	"How High the Moon"; Les Paul and Mary Ford	"How High the Moon"; Les Paul and Mary Ford	"Mockin' Bird Hill"	
May 26	"How High the Moon"; Les Paul and Mary Ford	"How High the Moon"; Les Paul and Mary Ford	"How High the Moon"; Les Paul and Mary Ford	"How High the Moon"	
June 2	"How High the Moon"; Les Paul and Mary Ford	"How High the Moon"; Les Paul and Mary Ford	"How High the Moon"; Les Paul and Mary Ford	"How High the Moon"	
June 9	"How High the Moon"; Les Paul and Mary Ford	"How High the Moon"; Les Paul and Mary Ford	"How High the Moon"; Les Paul and Mary Ford	"How High the Moon"	
June 16	"How High the Moon"; Les Paul and Mary Ford	"How High the Moon"; Les Paul and Mary Ford	"How High the Moon"; Les Paul and Mary Ford	"How High the Moon"	
June 23	"Too Young"; Nat "King" Cole with Orchestra Conducted by Les Baxter	"How High the Moon"; Les Paul and Mary Ford	"How High the Moon"; Les Paul and Mary Ford	"Too Young"	
June 30	"Too Young"; Nat "King" Cole with Orchestra Conducted by Les Baxter	"Too Young"; Nat "King" Cole with Orchestra Conducted by Les Baxter	"How High the Moon"; Les Paul and Mary Ford	"Too Young"	
July 7	"Too Young"; Nat "King" Cole with Orchestra Conducted by Les Baxter	"Too Young"; Nat "King" Cole with Orchestra Conducted by Les Baxter	"Too Young"; Nat "King" Cole with Orchestra Conducted by Les Baxter	"Too Young"	
July 14	"Too Young"; Nat "King" Cole with Orchestra Conducted by Les Baxter	"Too Young"; Nat "King" Cole with Orchestra Conducted by Les Baxter	"Too Young"; Nat "King" Cole with Orchestra Conducted by Les Baxter	"Too Young"	
July 21	"Too Young"; Nat "King" Cole with Orchestra Conducted by Les Baxter	"Too Young"; Nat "King" Cole with Orchestra Conducted by Les Baxter	"Too Young"; Nat "King" Cole with Orchestra Conducted by Les Baxter	"Too Young"	
July 28	"Come On-a My House"; Rosemary Clooney with Stan Freeman, Mundell Lowe, Jimmy Crawford, and Frank Caroll	"Come On-a My House"; Rosemary Clooney with Stan Freeman, Mundell Lowe, Jimmy Crawford, and Frank Caroll	"Too Young"; Nat "King" Cole with Orchestra Conducted by Les Baxter	"Too Young"	
August 4	"Come On-a My House"; Rosemary Clooney with Stan Freeman, Mundell Lowe, Jimmy Crawford, and Frank Caroll	"Come On-a My House"; Rosemary Clooney with Stan Freeman, Mundell Lowe, Jimmy Crawford, and Frank Caroll	"Come On-a My House"; Rosemary Clooney with Stan Freeman, Mundell Lowe, Jimmy Crawford, and Frank Caroll	"Too Young"	
August 11	"Come On-a My House"; Rosemary Clooney with Stan Freeman, Mundell Lowe, Jimmy Crawford, and Frank Caroll	"Come On-a My House"; Rosemary Clooney with Stan Freeman, Mundell Lowe, Jimmy Crawford, and Frank Caroll	"Come On-a My House"; Rosemary Clooney with Stan Freeman, Mundell Lowe, Jimmy Crawford, and Frank Caroll	"Come On-A My House"	
August 18	"Come On-a My House"; Rosemary Clooney with Stan Freeman, Mundell Lowe, Jimmy Crawford, and Frank Caroll	"Come On-a My House"; Rosemary Clooney with Stan Freeman, Mundell Lowe, Jimmy Crawford, and Frank Caroll	"Come On-a My House"; Rosemary Clooney with Stan Freeman, Mundell Lowe, Jimmy Crawford, and Frank Caroll	"Come On-A My House"	
August 25	"Come On-a My House"; Rosemary Clooney with Stan Freeman, Mundell Lowe, Jimmy Crawford, and Frank Caroll	"Come On-a My House"; Rosemary Clooney with Stan Freeman, Mundell Lowe, Jimmy Crawford, and Frank Caroll	"Come On-a My House"; Rosemary Clooney with Stan Freeman, Mundell Lowe, Jimmy Crawford, and Frank Caroll	"Come On-A My House"	
September 1	"Come On-a My House"; Rosemary Clooney with Stan Freeman, Mundell Lowe, Jimmy Crawford, and Frank Caroll	"Come On-a My House"; Rosemary Clooney with Stan Freeman, Mundell Lowe, Jimmy Crawford, and Frank Caroll	"Come On-a My House"; Rosemary Clooney with Stan Freeman, Mundell Lowe, Jimmy Crawford, and Frank Caroll	"Come On-A My House"	
September 8	"Because of You"; Tony Bennett with Orchestra under the direction of Percy Faith	"Come On-a My House"; Rosemary Clooney with Stan Freeman, Mundell Lowe, Jimmy Crawford, and Frank Caroll	"Come On-a My House"; Rosemary Clooney with Stan Freeman, Mundell Lowe, Jimmy Crawford, and Frank Caroll	"Because of You"	
September 15	"Because of You"; Tony Bennett with Orchestra under the direction of Percy Faith	"Come On-a My House"; Rosemary Clooney with Stan Freeman, Mundell Lowe, Jimmy Crawford, and Frank Caroll	"Come On-a My House"; Rosemary Clooney with Stan Freeman, Mundell Lowe, Jimmy Crawford, and Frank Caroll	"Because of You"	
September 22	"Because of You"; Tony Bennett with Orchestra under the direction of Percy Faith	"Because of You"; Tony Bennett with Orchestra under the direction of Percy Faith	"Come On-a My House"; Rosemary Clooney with Stan Freeman, Mundell Lowe, Jimmy Crawford, and Frank Caroll	"Because of You"	
September 29	"Because of You"; Tony Bennett with Orchestra under the direction of Percy Faith	"Because of You"; Tony Bennett with Orchestra under the direction of Percy Faith	"Because of You"; Tony Bennett with Orchestra under the direction of Percy Faith	"Because of You"	
October 6	"Because of You"; Tony Bennett with Orchestra under the direction of Percy Faith	"Because of You"; Tony Bennett with Orchestra under the direction of Percy Faith	"Because of You"; Tony Bennett with Orchestra under the direction of Percy Faith	"Because of You"	
October 13	"Because of You"; Tony Bennett with Orchestra under the direction of Percy Faith	"Because of You"; Tony Bennett with Orchestra under the direction of Percy Faith	"Because of You"; Tony Bennett with Orchestra under the direction of Percy Faith	"Because of You"	
October 20	"Because of You"; Tony Bennett with Orchestra under the direction of Percy Faith	"Because of You"; Tony Bennett with Orchestra under the direction of Percy Faith	"Because of You"; Tony Bennett with Orchestra under the direction of Percy Faith	"Because of You"	
October 27	"Because of You"; Tony Bennett with Orchestra under the direction of Percy Faith	"Because of You"; Tony Bennett with Orchestra under the direction of Percy Faith	"Because of You"; Tony Bennett with Orchestra under the direction of Percy Faith	"Because of You"	
November 3	"Cold, Cold Heart"; Tony Bennett with Percy Faith and his Orchestra	"Because of You"; Tony Bennett with Orchestra under the direction of Percy Faith	"Because of You"; Tony Bennett with Orchestra under the direction of Percy Faith	"Because of You"	
November 10	"Cold, Cold Heart"; Tony Bennett with Percy Faith and his Orchestra	"Because of You"; Tony Bennett with Orchestra under the direction of Percy Faith	"Because of You"; Tony Bennett with Orchestra under the direction of Percy Faith	"Because of You"	
November 17	"Cold, Cold Heart"; Tony Bennett with Percy Faith and his Orchestra	"(It's No) Sin"; Eddy Howard and His Orchestra	"Because of You"; Tony Bennett with Orchestra under the direction of Percy Faith	"(It's No) Sin"	
November 24	"Cold, Cold Heart"; Tony Bennett with Percy Faith and his Orchestra	"(It's No) Sin"; Eddy Howard and His Orchestra	"Because of You"; Tony Bennett with Orchestra under the direction of Percy Faith	"(It's No) Sin"	
December 1	"Cold, Cold Heart"; Tony Bennett with Percy Faith and his Orchestra	"(It's No) Sin"; Eddy Howard and His Orchestra	"Because of You"; Tony Bennett with Orchestra under the direction of Percy Faith	"(It's No) Sin"	
December 8	"Cold, Cold Heart"; Tony Bennett with Percy Faith and his Orchestra	"(It's No) Sin"; Eddy Howard and His Orchestra	"Cold, Cold Heart"; Tony Bennett with Percy Faith and his Orchestra	"(It's No) Sin"	
December 15	"(It's No) Sin"; Eddy Howard and His Orchestra	"(It's No) Sin"; Eddy Howard and His Orchestra	"Cold, Cold Heart"; Tony Bennett with Percy Faith and his Orchestra	"(It's No) Sin"	
December 22	"(It's No) Sin"; Eddy Howard and His Orchestra	"(It's No) Sin"; Eddy Howard and His Orchestra	"Cold, Cold Heart"; Tony Bennett with Percy Faith and his Orchestra	"(It's No) Sin"	
December 29	"Cry"; Johnnie Ray with The Four Lads	"(It's No) Sin"; Eddy Howard and His Orchestra	"(It's No) Sin"; Eddy Howard and His Orchestra	"(It's No) Sin"	

== See also ==
- 1951 in music
