= The Big Store =

1941 Marx Brothers film by Charles Reisner

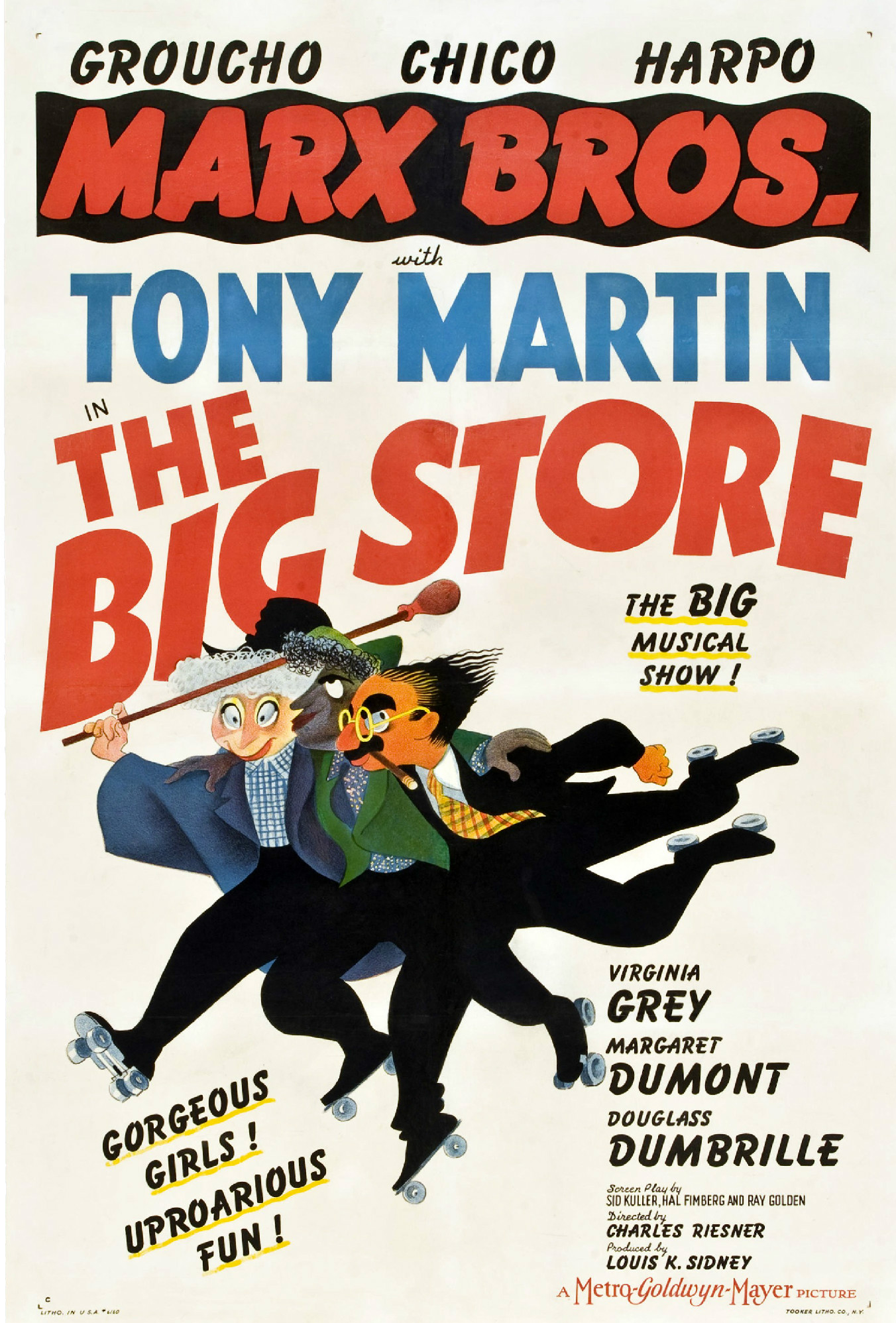
- Theatrical poster for The Big Store (1941)
- Directed by: Charles Reisner
- Screenplay by: Sid Kuller; Hal Fimberg; Ray Golden
- Story by: Nat Perrin
- Produced by: Louis K. Sidney
- Starring: Groucho Marx; Chico Marx; Harpo Marx; Tony Martin; Virginia Grey; Margaret Dumont; Douglass Dumbrille
- Cinematography: Charles Lawton Jr.
- Edited by: Conrad A. Nervig
- Music by: Hal Borne; Georgie Stoll (musical direction); Earl Brent (adaptation); Arthur Appell (dance direction)
- Production company: Metro-Goldwyn-Mayer
- Distributed by: Loew's Inc.
- Release date: June 20, 1941
- Running time: 83 minutes
- Country: United States
- Language: English

The Big Store is a 1941 American comedy film directed by Charles Reisner and starring the Marx Brothers (Groucho, Harpo and Chico) that takes place in a large department store. Groucho appears as private detective Wolf J. Flywheel (a character name originating from the Marx-Perrin radio show Flywheel, Shyster, and Flywheel in the early 1930s).

The Big Store was the last of the five films that the Marx Bros. made under contract to Metro-Goldwyn-Mayer. The Marxes had decided to retire as a team and The Big Store was advertised as their farewell film. However, they would return to the screen in A Night in Casablanca (1946) and Love Happy (1949).

The film also features singer Tony Martin (who received co-billing with the Marxes) and Virginia Grey as the love interests and longtime Marx Brothers foil Margaret Dumont in her seventh and final film with the Marxes. The villain is portrayed by Douglass Dumbrille, who had played a similar role in A Day at the Races (1937).

== Plot ==
Singer Tommy Rogers has recently inherited half ownership of the Phelps department store from his late uncle, Hiram Phelps; Martha Phelps, Hiram's sister and Tommy's aunt, owns the other half. Tommy has no interest in running a department store, so he plans to sell his share of the business to finance a new music conservatory. Mr. Grover, the store manager, is plotting to murder Tommy; if Tommy dies before he can sell, Martha inherits his half of the store. Grover then plans to marry the wealthy Martha and then eventually kill her, becoming sole owner of the Phelps department store. After an attempt to kill Tommy by a hired thug fails, Martha becomes extremely worried about her nephew's safety, lest anyone should suspect her of engaging in foul play to take over the store. Against Grover's wishes, Martha hires private detective Wolf J. Flywheel as a floorwalker and Tommy's bodyguard. Tommy is in love with Joan Sutton, a store employee. Flywheel romances Martha, while Wacky, Flywheel's assistant and driver, is reunited with his brother Ravelli, Tommy's best friend. Eventually, Flywheel, Ravelli and Wacky expose Grover and his henchmen and save Tommy.

== Cast ==
- Groucho Marx as Wolf J. Flywheel
- Chico Marx as Ravelli
- Harpo Marx as Wacky
- Tony Martin as Tommy Rogers
- Virginia Grey as Joan Sutton
- Margaret Dumont as Martha Phelps
- Douglass Dumbrille as Mr. Grover
- William Tannen as Fred Sutton
- Marion Martin as Peggy Arden
- Virginia O'Brien as Kitty
- Henry Armetta as Giuseppi
- Anna Demetrio as Maria
- Paul Stanton as George Hastings
- Russell Hicks as Arthur Hastings
- Bradley Page as Duke
- Six Hits and a Miss
- Charles Lane as Finance Company Agent (uncredited)
- Adrian Morris as Piano-Mover (uncredited)
- John Berkes as Janitor (uncredited)

== Production ==
The film has two extended scenes with all three Marx Brothers. One is in the store's bed department, with several unusual beds that appear out of the walls and floor. The other takes place near the film's climax, when Groucho, Chico and Harpo escape their pursuers in a madcap chase through the store on roller skates. This elaborate sequence took an entire month to shoot and utilized stop motion photography, Mack Sennett-type slapstick stunts and stunt doubles, all unusual for a Marx Brothers film. Oddly, a "funny" janitor also appears in this scene as a sort of comic relief.

At two points, Groucho breaks the fourth wall. During the musical number "Sing While You Sell", he narrates a fashion show and speaks a few asides, including "This is a bright red dress, but Technicolor is so expensive." At the end of the film, after Grover has been exposed as the villain, Groucho informs the audience, "I told you in the first reel he was a crook!"

== Music ==
As with the previous Marx Bros. MGM films, The Big Store contains elaborate musical numbers, including the upbeat "Sing While You Sell" featuring Groucho and Harpo (Oddly, Chico is absent) and "Tenement Symphony" sung by Tony Martin and a children's choir. The screenwriting team of Sid Kuller, Hal Fimberg and Ray Golden also supplied the lyrics to Hal Borne's original music. An instrumental version of the Arthur Freed/Nacio Herb Brown tune "Sing Before Breakfast" from Broadway Melody of 1936 is heard during the scene in Flywheel's office. The Big Store is the second Marx film with an instrumental version of "Cosi-Cosa" from A Night at the Opera, which can be heard during the bed department scene. It was also heard at the beginning of the racetrack scene in A Day at the Races.

- "If It's You": Tony Martin (music and lyrics by Ben Oakland, Artie Shaw and Milton Drake)
- "Sing While You Sell": Groucho, Harpo, Six Hits and a Miss and Virginia O'Brien
- "Rock-a-bye Baby": Virginia O'Brien
- "Mamãe eu quero": Chico and Harpo (piano duet)
- "A Whimsical Trio": Harpo (harp, violin, cello) (by Mario Castelnuovo-Tedesco, using music from a Mozart sonata and a Beethoven minuet)
- "Tenement Symphony": Tony Martin, onstage choir and orchestra, featuring Chico and Harpo

== Reception ==
Reviews for The Big Store were generally positive, but unenthusiastic.

Theodore Strauss of The New York Times wrote that "if it lacks the continuously harebrained invention of, say, A Night at the Opera, the boys are still the most erratic maniacs this side of bars. If one were entirely truthful one would have to admit that the picture has many a dull stretch, that the tricks have been overworked, that the boys are slowing down, etc., etc. But with Marxian adherents—among whom we most decidedly belong—the question is simply, Are the Marx Brothers in it? They are."

A review in Variety called the film a "moderate comedy where dull stretches overshadow the several socko laugh sequences during a bumpy unfolding ... Marx Bros. repeat their familiar antics without much variation from previous appearances."

Film Daily suggested that a couple of the chase scenes were "a little lengthy" but still concluded, "A 'laugh clocker' could run a high total checking this and the preview audience seemed to love it."

John Mosher of The New Yorker wrote that the film was "not great Marx material, not a film that collectors will exhibit as a sample of this era's humor, but again and again the old flash is there."

The Big Store returned a modest profit of $33,000, but was initially the most profitable of the Marxes' three final films for MGM.
