= There Will Never Be Another You =

1942 song by Harry Warren

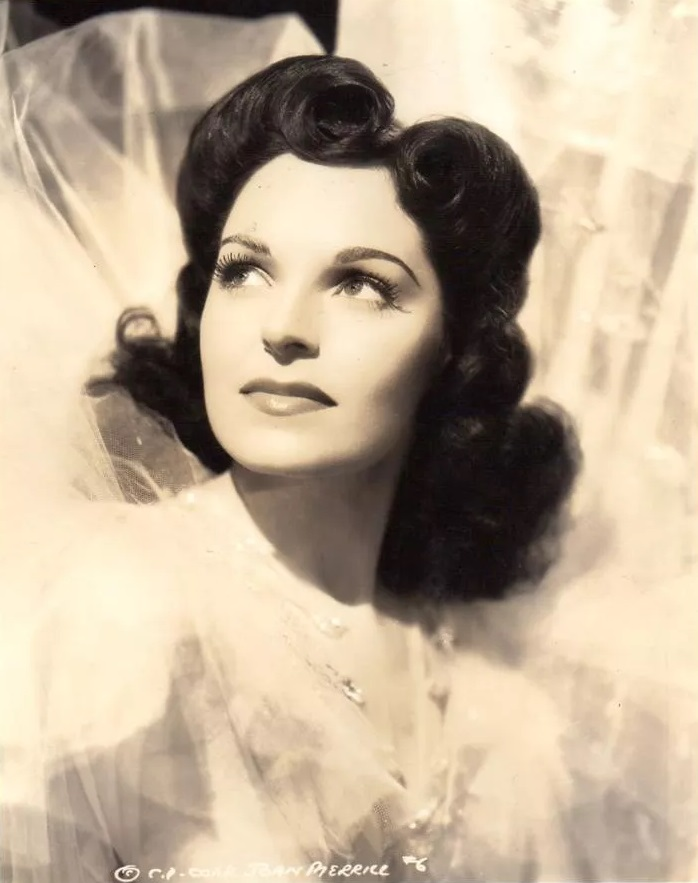

Song by Joan Merrill
- Published: 1942
- Released: 1942
- Genre: Jazz; swing; pop
- Composer: Harry Warren
- Lyricist: Mack Gordon

"There Will Never Be Another You" is a popular song with music by Harry Warren and lyrics by Mack Gordon that was written for the Twentieth Century Fox musical Iceland (1942), starring Sonja Henie and John Payne. The songs in the film featured Joan Merrill accompanied by Sammy Kaye and His Orchestra.

"This was one of the first musicals made following U.S. entry into the war", wrote film historian Tony Thomas, who noted that three of the songs in Iceland have faded from memory. "But the song that shines from this film like a beacon is 'There Will Never Be Another You'. The melody, built on long rising and falling intervals, is one of the loveliest Warren ever wrote. For all its simplicity it is free of clichès and full of beguiling modulations. Like so many fine pieces of art, this song gives the impression of being written effortlessly. The notes follow each other with a gracious kind of logic."

"There Will Never Be Another You" was published in 1942 and is considered a jazz standard. A 1966 Chris Montez recording of the song lifted from his album The More I See You went to #4 on the Easy Listening chart and #33 on the Hot 100.

== Recorded versions ==
Release	Performer	Vocalist	Recording date	Album	Label	Source
1942	Joan Merrill with Sammy Kaye and His Orchestra	Joan Merrill	1942	Film Iceland	Bluebird	
1942	Teddy Powell and His Orchestra	Peggy Mann	July 17, 1942		Bluebird	
1942	Woody Herman and His Orchestra	instrumental	July 24, 1942	single	Decca	
1942	Tommy Tucker Time		July 31, 1942		Okeh	
1942	Victor Silvester & His Ballroom Orchestra	Instrumental	1942		Columbia	
1950	Lionel Hampton Quintet	instrumental	January 16, 1950		Decca	
1951	Gordon Jenkins & His Orchestra	Gordon Jenkins		Time to Dance with Gordon Jenkins	Capitol	
1954	Lester Young with Oscar Peterson	instrumental	November 28, 1952	Lester Young with the Oscar Peterson Trio	Norgran	
1954	Chet Baker		February 15, 1954	Chet Baker Sings	Pacific Jazz	
1955	Nat King Cole		August 25, 1955	Nat King Cole Sings for Two in Love	Capitol	
1957	Stan Getz Quartet	instrumental	November 24, 1956	The Steamer	Verve	
1958	Lee Morgan with Curtis Fuller & Hank Mobley	instrumental	April 21, 1958	Monday Night at Birdland	Roulette	
1966	Chris Montez		1966	The More I See You	A&M	
1967	Julie London		1966	Nice Girls Don't Stay For Breakfast	Liberty	
1988	Dexter Gordon	instrumental	July 20, 1967	Body and Soul	Black Lion	
1994	Rosemary Clooney					
2023	Rickie Lee Jones		April 28, 2023	Pieces of Treasure	Modern Recordings	
2025	Matilda Mann			Chet Baker Re:imagined		
