= Chris Montez =

American guitarist and vocalist (born 1943)

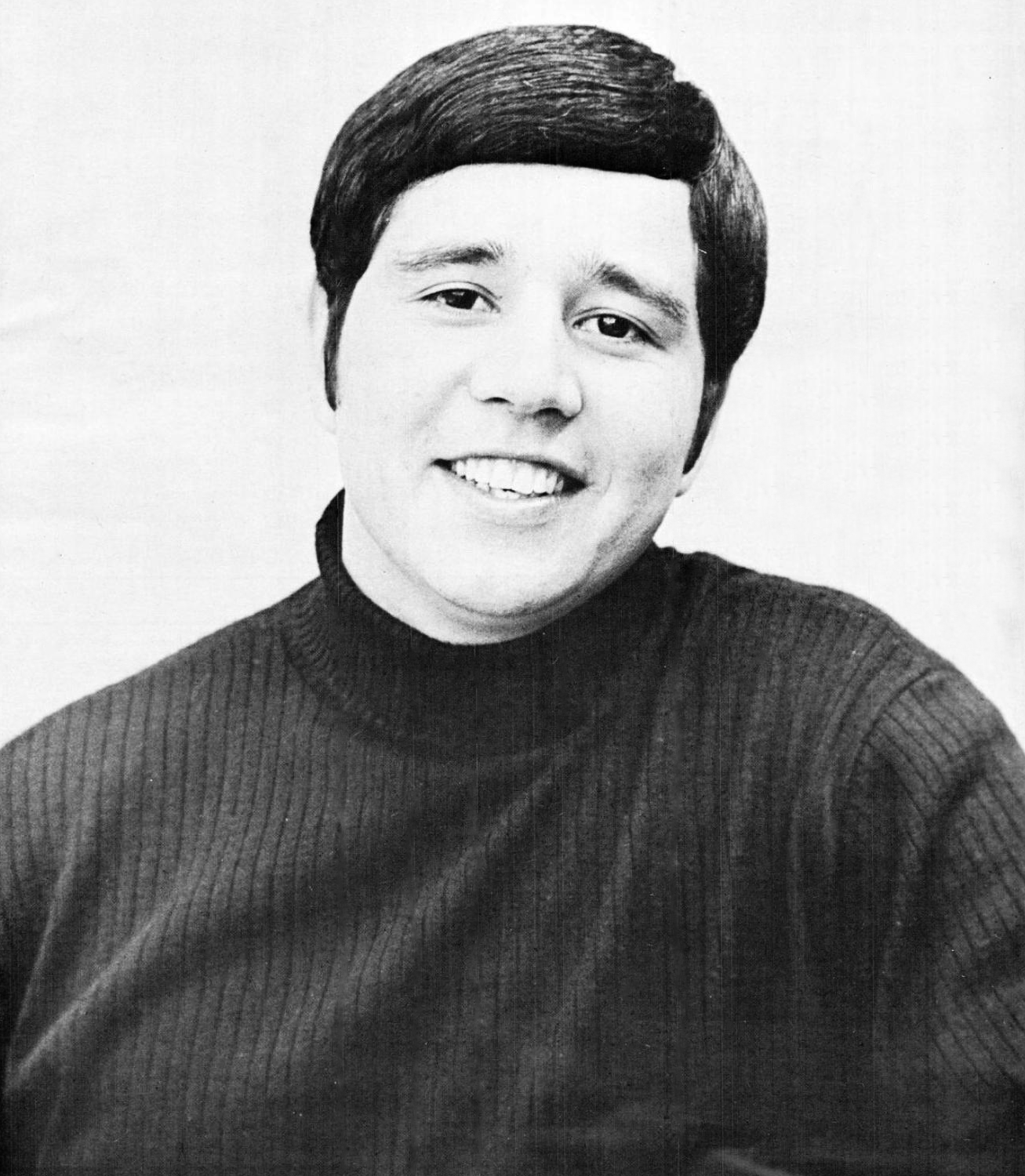
- Montez in March 1967

Background information
- Born: Ezekiel Christopher Montañez; January 17, 1943 (age 83); Los Angeles, California, US
- Genres: Rock and roll; traditional pop; easy listening; latin
- Occupations: Singer-songwriter; musician
- Instruments: Guitar; vocals
- Years active: 1962–present
- Labels: A&M; Monogram; Columbia
- Website: Official website

Chris Montez (born Ezekiel Christopher Montañez; January 17, 1943) is an American guitarist and vocalist, whose stylistic approach has ranged from rock & roll to pop standards and Latin music. His rock sound is exemplified in songs such as his 1962 hit "Let's Dance", which reached No. 4 on the Billboard Hot 100. When his early music's popularity began to fade, he switched to a more traditional role as a popular singer of soft ballads, scoring hits with “The More I See You” and “Call Me" in 1966. He has also recorded in Latin styles. Over the intervening years, he has continued to work in all three modes.

== Early life ==
Born in Los Angeles, California, United States, Montez grew up in Hawthorne, California, in a Mexican-American family and was influenced by the Latino-flavored music of his community and the success of his musical hero Ritchie Valens whom he met briefly at a show in 1958. He studied music composition at El Camino College.

In 1962, he recorded the single "Let's Dance" on Monogram Records (written and produced by Jim Lee). It went to No. 4 on the Billboard Hot 100 chart in the US and to No. 2 on the UK Singles Chart (spending four weeks there). The follow-up, "Some Kinda Fun", was a lesser hit in the US, but reached No. 10 in the UK in January 1963. Nonetheless, both records sold over one million copies, and were awarded gold discs.

Montez toured with Clyde McPhatter, Sam Cooke, The Platters, and Smokey Robinson and the Miracles. The Beatles opened London, York, and Northampton concerts for him while Montez was performing with Tommy Roe. Montez commented "Who are these guys, The Beatles? I try to keep up with the British scene, but I don't know their work."

== 1966 comeback ==
Montez returned to the recording studio in 1965, this time at A&M Records. He was searching for the same rock and roll formula that would replicate the success of "Let's Dance". During a recording session, A&M co-founder Herb Alpert, who co-produced Montez's first A&M album, suggested that Montez try a different approach: a middle of the road, soft ballad sound. Though reluctant at first, Montez agreed to go along with his mentor's suggestion.

"Call Me" (a Tony Hatch composition first recorded by Petula Clark) was the first single released from his 1966 A&M album, The More I See You. The title single from the album, sung in a soft, very high tenor range and played on primarily adult-formatted radio stations, confused some disc jockeys who were unfamiliar with Montez's past work. The track became popular and has been used many times in movies, notably Frantic starring Harrison Ford.

Released in November 1965, "Call Me" entered the Easy Listening Top 40 in Billboard that December, entering the Billboard Hot 100 in January 1966; that March "Call Me" peaked on the Easy Listening chart at No. 2 and on the Hot 100 at No. 22.

The More I See You album yielded two additional Top 40 singles for Montez: the title track, plus "There Will Never Be Another You".

== Later years ==
Montez recorded three more albums for A&M: Time After Time, Foolin' Around, and Watch What Happens. None of these albums mirrored the success of The More I See You. The title track "Time After Time", did reach No. 36 on the Billboard Hot 100, but no other singles made the top 40. Subsequent singles hit below the top 40, or only on the Billboard Easy Listening Top 40. Following the release of Watch What Happens in 1968, Montez left A&M Records.

In 1972, Montez charted a Latin hit in the Netherlands: "Loco Por Ti (Crazy About You)". The Following year he scored within the top-5 on the Dutch pop charts with "Ay No Digas".

Montez resurfaced in 1974 at CBS Records, with the release of The Best of Chris Montez, a mix of both old and new recordings.

Montez recorded one more album for CBS: Raza: Ay No Digas, which did well internationally, but failed to make an impact in the US. His final album, with exclusively Spanish-language material, was Cartas de Amor, released in 1983.

"Let's Dance" appeared on the soundtrack of John Landis's Animal House. In 2013, the song was used as a jingle for a DSW Shoe Warehouse commercial.

== Montez today ==
In July 2008, Frozen Pictures announced plans to produce a documentary musical film on Montez's life and career. The film, El Viaje Musical de Ezekiel Montanez: The Chris Montez Story, was previewed by Montez, director Burt Kearns and producer Brett Hudson at the Paso Robles Digital Film Festival in Paso Robles, California in November 2009, The Fest For Beatles Fans in March 2010 in Secaucus, New Jersey and, in May 2010, at the Pacific Palisades Film Festival in Pacific Palisades, California.

Montez has worked within the Mexican-American communities in the US, especially his native California, promoting education and healthy living. His work was recognized in San Antonio, Texas, on September 16, 2011, with the First Annual SOPA (Stop Obesity Promote Activity) Wellness Award. It was among four awards given to national celebrities.

In 2012, Montez was named a distinguished alumnus of El Camino College.

== Discography ==
=== Studio albums ===
- Let's Dance and Have Some Fun (1963)
- The More I See You (1966)
- Time After Time (1966)
- Foolin' Around (1967)
- Watch What Happens (1968)
- Let's Dance (1972)
- Cartas De Amor (1983)

==== Let's Dance album info ====
Track listing:

1. "Let's Dance" (Jim Lee) – 2:16
2. "Mona Lisa" (Jay Livingston, Ray Evans) – 2:50
3. "You're So Fine" (Lance Finney, Willie Schofield) – 2:07
4. "Yesterday I Heard the Rain" (Armando Manzanero, Gene Lees) – 2:07
5. "Heart and Soul" (Frank Loesser, Hoagy Carmichael) – 2:01
6. "Dolores, Dolores" (Chris Montez, Billy Meshel) – 2:37
7. "Ay No Digas (Oh, Don't Tell Me)" (Chris Montez, Billy Meshel) – 2:40
8. "A Little Bit of Soap" (Bert Russell) – 2:12
9. "When Your Heart is Full of Love (Your Eyes Begin to Overflow)" (Chris Montez, Billy Meshel) – 3:28
10. "Somebody Loves You" (Chris Montez, Billy Mershel) – 2:52
11. "Come On, Let's Go” (Ritchie Valens) – 2:10
- Produced by: Billy Meshel
- Recorded at: Sound Ideas Studio, N.Y.
- Record Label: CBS
- Released: 1972
