= Nick DeCaro =

American musician (1938–1992)

- Born: Nicholas Joseph De Caro; June 23, 1938
- Died: March 4, 1992 (aged 53)
- Genre: Soft rock
- Occupations: Producer, arranger, conductor
- Instruments: Vocals, piano, accordion
- Years active: 1967–1991
- Labels: A&M, Blue Thumb

Nick DeCaro (June 23, 1938 – March 4, 1992) was an American arranger, producer, conductor, composer, and musician. During his career, DeCaro collaborated on more than 380 albums and worked with artists such as Dolly Parton, Randy Newman, Helen Reddy, Barbra Streisand, Johnny Cash, the Rolling Stones, Arlo Guthrie and the Doobie Brothers. DeCaro has also performed on more than 70 albums for Grammy Award-winning artists and albums.

== Biography ==
DeCaro's career in music began with his brother Frank as a teen, touring with the USO, performing at local talent shows, and hosting a radio show on Cleveland station WJW. In the late 1950s, the duo expanded to include Bill Krempasky on bass and future record producer Tommy LiPuma on saxophone to form the Mello D's. It was through LiPuma that the DeCaros eventually became involved with Liberty Records in Los Angeles, and Nick DeCaro began his successful career as a producer, conductor, arranger, and musician.

Throughout the 1970s and 1980s, DeCaro produced and arranged tracks for artists at Liberty Records, A&M, and Warner/Reprise, including Andy Williams, Randy Newman, James Taylor, Gordon Lightfoot, Neil Diamond, George Benson, Dolly Parton, Barbra Streisand, and Rickie Lee Jones. Over the years, DeCaro also recorded on tracks for Prince, Arlo Guthrie, the Rolling Stones, Randy Newman, Neil Diamond, Johnny Cash, Carly Simon, Dolly Parton, Glenn Frey, and many more, playing the accordion or concertina.

In 1969, DeCaro recorded his own album for A&M Records, Happy Heart. Nick's version of the title track was an instrumental and reached number 22 on Billboard's Easy Listening chart. Andy Williams wanted to record it as a vocal track and asked DeCaro for an arrangement. Nick's arrangement for Williams was almost identical to his instrumental. Williams' version became a number one hit on the Adult Contemporary chart in 1969. His first solo album, Italian Graffiti, was released in April 1974 by Blue Thumb Records. Italian Graffiti influenced Japanese city pop singer Tatsuro Yamashita; Nick DeCaro's name was on the list of possible arrangers for Tatsuro's first solo album, Circus Town, in 1976, but did not come to fruition due to lack of contact. In 1990, DeCaro released Love Storm, a collection of songs, mainly written by Yamashita; although this album was not a collaboration, the songs were suggested by Yamashita himself.

DeCaro died on March 4, 1992, aged 53.

== Discography ==
=== As leader ===
- Happy Heart as Nick DeCaro and His Orchestra (1969), A&M, (No. 165 US)
- Italian Graffiti (1974), Blue Thumb
- Love Storm (1990), Invitation
- Private Ocean (1991), Roux
