= 1952 in music =

This is a list of notable events in music that took place in the year 1952.

== Specific locations ==
- 1952 in British music
- 1952 in Scandinavian music

== Specific genres ==
- 1952 in country music
- 1952 in jazz

== Events ==
- February 26 – Popular American singer Jo Stafford marries bandleader/arranger Paul Weston.
- March 1 – Sun Records records its first release in Memphis, Tennessee.
- March 7 – New Musical Express is launched as a weekly newspaper in the United Kingdom.
- March 21 – First major rock and roll concert, Alan Freed's Moondog Coronation Ball in Cleveland, Ohio, United States.
- May 31 – Sangeet Natak Akademi is set up by the government of India.
- c. July – Finnish composer Aarre Merikanto wins the Olympic hymn competition.
- August 29 – David Tudor gives the premiere of John Cage's 4′33″, during which the performer does not play, in Woodstock, New York.
- September – Bill Haley and His Saddlemen change their image to become Bill Haley & His Comets.
- October 7 – First edition of Bob Horn's Bandstand is broadcast as a local show from station WFIL-TV in Philadelphia, Pennsylvania. It is later renamed American Bandstand and syndicated.
- November 14 – The first UK Singles Chart is published by the New Musical Express, with Al Martino's "Here in My Heart" as number one.
- date unknown
  - Jazz singer Ernesto Bonino moves from Italy to the United States.
  - Accordionist John Serry Sr. first performs in Broadway theatre with Shirley Booth in The Time of the Cuckoo.

== Publications ==
- Pierre Schaeffer – A la recherche d'une musique concrète (The Search for a Concrete Music), an explanation of his experimental approach to composing.
- John Serry Sr. – The Syncopated Accordionist.

== Musical groups formed ==
- 76th Army Band
- 338th Army Band (reactivated)
- The Duke's Men of Yale (a cappella singing group)
- Steiner Brothers, tap-dancing trio and singing group

== Albums released ==
- Anthology of American Folk Music – Various Artists
- As You Desire Me – Jo Stafford
- Billie Holiday Sings – Billie Holiday
- Bird and Diz – Charlie Parker and Dizzy Gillespie
- Christmas Day in the Morning – Burl Ives
- Christmas with Eddie Fisher – Eddie Fisher
- Eddie Fisher Sings – Eddie Fisher
- Favorite Spirituals – Ames Brothers
- Harmony Encores – The Chordettes
- Home on the Range – Ames Brothers
- Johnnie Ray – Johnnie Ray
- I'm in the Mood for Love – Eddie Fisher
- Mr. Rhythm Sings – Frankie Laine
- Oscar Peterson Plays Duke Ellington – Oscar Peterson
- Penthouse Serenade – Nat King Cole
- Song Favorites By Frankie Laine – Frankie Laine
- Tennessee Waltz – Patti Page

== US No. 1 hit singles ==
These singles reached the top of US Billboard magazine's charts in 1952.

First week	Number of weeks	Title	Artist
March 15, 1952	9	"Wheel of Fortune"	Kay Starr
May 17, 1952	5	"Blue Tango"	Leroy Anderson
June 21, 1952	2	"Here in My Heart"	Al Martino
July 5, 1952	1	"Delicado"	Percy Faith & his Orchestra
July 12, 1952	9	"Auf Wiederseh'n, Sweetheart"	Vera Lynn
September 13, 1952	5	"You Belong to Me"	Jo Stafford
October 18, 1952	5	"I Went to Your Wedding"	Patti Page
November 22, 1952	1	"It's in the Book"	Johnny Standley
November 29, 1952	4	"Why Don't You Believe Me?"	Joni James
December 27, 1952	2	"I Saw Mommy Kissing Santa Claus"	Jimmy Boyd

== Biggest hit singles ==
The following singles achieved the highest chart positions in the limited set of charts available for 1952.

#	Artist	Title	Year	Country	Chart entries
1	Percy Faith	Delicado	1952	Canada	US 1940s 1 – Apr 1952, US 1 for 1 weeks Jul 1952, Peel list 1 of 1951, US BB 18 of 1952, POP 18 of 1952, Italy 26 of 1952, RYM 127 of 1952
2	Jo Stafford	You Belong to Me	1952	US	UK 1 – Nov 1952, US 1940s 1 – Aug 1952, US 1 for 5 weeks Sep 1952, US BB 4 of 1952, POP 4 of 1952, RYM 145 of 1952
3	Al Martino	Here in My Heart	1952	US	UK 1 – Nov 1952, US 1940s 1 – May 1952, US 1 for 2 weeks Jun 1952, US BB 20 of 1952, POP 20 of 1952, RYM 22 of 1952
4	Kay Starr	Wheel of Fortune	1952	US	US 1940s 1 – Feb 1952, US 1 for 9 weeks Mar 1952, Peel list 3 of 1952, US BB 8 of 1952, POP 8 of 1952, DDD 35 of 1952, Acclaimed 2343
5	Frankie Laine	High Noon (Do Not Forsake Me)	1952	US	Oscar in 1952, US BB 3 of 1952, POP 3 of 1952, US 1940s 5 – Jul 1952, UK 7 – Nov 1952, RYM 34 of 1952, Italy 48 of 1952

== Top hits on record ==
- "A-round the Corner" – Jo Stafford
- "All of Me" – Johnnie Ray
- "Anytime" – Eddie Fisher
- "Auf Wiederseh'n Sweetheart" – Vera Lynn
- "Be My Life's Companion" – The Mills Brothers
- "Botch-A-Me (Ba-Ba-Baciami Piccina)" – Rosemary Clooney
- "Comes A-Long A-Love" – Kay Starr
- "Delicado" – Percy Faith & his Orchestra
- "The Glow-Worm" – The Mills Brothers
- "Goin' Home" - Fats Domino
- "A Guy Is a Guy" – Doris Day
- "Half As Much" – Rosemary Clooney
- "Heart and Soul" – The Four Aces featuring Al Alberts
- "Here in My Heart" – Al Martino
- "High Noon (Do Not Forsake Me)" – Frankie Laine
- "Hold Me, Thrill Me, Kiss Me" – Karen Chandler
- "How Long" - Fats Domino
- "I Saw Mommy Kissing Santa Claus" – Jimmy Boyd
- "I Went To Your Wedding" – Patti Page
- "I'll Walk Alone" – Don Cornell
- "I'm Confessin'" – Les Paul and Mary Ford
- "I'm Yours" – Eddie Fisher
- "Kiss Of Fire" – Georgia Gibbs
- "A Kiss to Build a Dream On" – Louis Armstrong
- "Lady of Spain" – Eddie Fisher
- "Lover" – Peggy Lee
- "Maybe" – Perry Como & Eddie Fisher
- "Meet Mister Callaghan", recorded by
  - Les Paul
  - Mitch Miller
  - Carmen Cavallaro and His Orchestra
- "My Song" – Johnny Ace
- "Pittsburgh, Pennsylvania" – Guy Mitchell
- "Please, Mr. Sun", recorded by:
  - Johnnie Ray & The Four Lads
  - Perry Como
  - Tommy Edwards
- "Poor Poor Me" - Fats Domino
- "Ramblin' Man" – Frankie Laine
- "Rock of Gibraltar" – Frankie Laine
- "Settin' the Woods on Fire" – Frankie Laine & Jo Stafford
- "Slow Poke" – Arthur Godfrey
- "So Madly in Love" – Georgia Gibbs
- "Somewhere Along The Way" – Nat King Cole
- "Sugarbush" – Doris Day & Frankie Laine
- "Tell Me Why" – Eddie Fisher
- "Temptation" – Mario Lanza
- "Tenderly" – Rosemary Clooney
- "Tiger Rag" – Les Paul and Mary Ford
- "Till I Waltz Again With You" – Teresa Brewer
- "Tonight You Belong to Me" – Frankie Laine
- "Trying" – The Hilltoppers
- "Unforgettable" – Nat King Cole
- "Walkin' My Baby Back Home" – Johnnie Ray
- "Wheel of Fortune" – Kay Starr
- "When I Fall in Love" – Doris Day
- "Why Don't You Believe Me" – Joni James
- "Winter Wonderland" – Perry Como
- "Wish You Were Here" – Eddie Fisher
- "You Belong to Me" – Jo Stafford

== Published popular music ==
- "Blue Tango" words: Mitchell Parish, music: Leroy Anderson
- "Comes A-Long A-Love" w.m. Al Sherman
- "Delicado" w. Jack Lawrence m. Waldyr Azevedo
- "(How Much Is) That Doggie in the Window?" w.m. Bob Merrill
- "Don't Laugh at Me ('Cause I'm a Fool)" w.m. Norman Wisdom & June Tremayne
- "Don't Let The Stars Get In Your Eyes" w.m. Barbara Trammel, Cactus Pryor & Slim Whitman
- "Faith Can Move Mountains" w. Ben Raleigh m. Guy Wood
- "Feet Up" w.m. Bob Merrill
- "A Fool Such As I" w.m. Bill Trader
- "Gonna Get Along Without Ya Now" w.m. Milton Kellem
- "A Guy Is A Guy" w.m. Oscar Brand
- "(Mama) He Treats Your Daughter Mean" w.m. Charles Singleton & J. H. Wallace
- "Here in My Heart" w.m. Pat Genaro, Lou Levinson & Bill Borrelli
- "High Noon" w. Ned Washington m. Dimitri Tiomkin
- "Hi-Lili, Hi-Lo" w. Helen Deutsch m. Bronislau Kaper
- "Hold Me, Thrill Me, Kiss Me" w.m. Harry Noble
- "Hound Dog" w.m. Jerry Leiber & Mike Stoller
- "I Know a Place" w. Sammy Cahn m. Vernon Duke Introduced by Doris Day & Ray Bolger in the film April in Paris
- "I Saw Mommy Kissing Santa Claus" w.m. Tommie Connor
- "I Went To Your Wedding" w.m. Jessie Mae Robinson
- "I'll Never Get Out Of This World Alive" w.m. Hank Williams & Fred Rose
- "I'm Hans Christian Andersen" w.m. Frank Loesser
- "Inchworm" w.m. Frank Loesser
- "It Wasn't God Who Made Honky Tonk Angels" w.m. J. D. Miller
- "It's In The Book" w.m. Johnny Standley & Art Thorsen
- "Jambalaya" w.m. Hank Williams
- "Kaw-Liga" w.m. Hank Williams & Fred Rose
- "Keep It A Secret" w.m. Jessie Mae Robinson
- "The King's New Clothes" w.m. Frank Loesser
- "Lawdy Miss Clawdy" w.m. Lloyd Price
- "Lean Baby" w. Roy Alfred m. Billy May
- "Lullaby of Birdland" w. B. Y. Forster (pseudonym for George David Weiss) m. George Shearing
- "Luna Rossa" w. (Eng) Kermit Goell (Ital) V. de Crescenzo m. A. Vian
- "Mister Taptoe" w.m. Terry Gilkyson, Richard Dehr & Frank Miller
- "Never Smile at a Crocodile" F. Churchill, J. Lawrence
- "Oh Happy Day" w.m. Donald Howard Koplow & Nancy Binns Reed
- "The Ol' Spring Fever" w. Leo Robin m. Harry Warren from the film Just For You
- "One Mint Julep" w.m. Rudy Toombs
- "Outside of Heaven" w. Sammy Gallop m. Chester Conn
- "Petite Fleur" m. Sidney Bechet
- "Pittsburgh, Pennsylvania" w.m. Bob Merrill
- "Pretend" w.m. Lew Douglas, Cliff Parman & Frank Levere
- "Pretty Little Black-Eyed Susie" Kay Twomey, Fred Wise & Ben Weisman
- "Raminay (The New Orleans Chimney Sweep)" w.m. J. Lawrence, Sammy Fain
- "She Wears Red Feathers" w.m. Bob Merrill
- "Sugar Bush" w.m. Josef Marais
- "Take These Chains from My Heart" w.m. Fred Rose & Hy Heath
- "Takes Two to Tango" w.m. Al Hoffman & Dick Manning
- "That's All" w. Alan Brandt m. Bob Haymes
- "That's Entertainment!" w. Howard Dietz m. Arthur Schwartz
- "Till I Waltz Again With You" w.m. Sidney Prosen
- "The Ugly Duckling" w.m. Frank Loesser
- "To Know You (Is to Love You)" w. Allan Roberts m. Robert Allen
- "Walkin' To Missouri" w.m. Bob Merrill
- "Wheel Of Fortune" w.m. Bennie Benjamin & George David Weiss
- "When I Fall in Love" w. Edward Heyman m. Victor Young
- "Why Don't You Believe Me?" w.m. Lew Douglas, King Laney & Roy Rodde
- "Wish You Were Here" w.m. Harold Rome
- "You Belong to Me" w.m. Pee Wee King, Redd Stewart & Chilton Price
- "Your Cheatin' Heart" w.m. Hank Williams
- "Zing A Little Zong" w. Leo Robin m. Harry Warren

== Top R&B and country hits on record ==
- "5-10-15 Hours" – Ruth Brown
- "Daddy Daddy" – Ruth Brown
- "Hound Dog" – Big Mama Thornton
- "Jambalaya (On the Bayou)" – Hank Williams
- "Juke" – Little Walter
- "Lawdy Miss Clawdy" – Lloyd Price
- "Midnight Special" – The Weavers
- "Night Train" – Jimmy Forrest
- "Wimoweh" – The Weavers
- "Worry, Worry, Worry" – Joe Houston
- "It Wasn't God Who Made Honky Tonk Angels" – Kitty Wells

== Classical music ==
=== Premieres ===
Composer	Composition	Date	Location	Performers
Arnold, Malcolm	English Dances, set 2, Op. 33	1952-08-05	London (Proms)	BBC Symphony – Sargent
Beck, Conrad	Hymne	1952-10-11	Donaueschingen Festival, Germany	SWF Symphony – Rosbaud
Berio, Luciano	Due pezzi for violin and piano	1952–?-?	Lenox, Massachusetts (Tanglewood MF)	Lorin Maazel (violin), Seymour Lipkin (piano)
Cage, John	4′33″	1952-08-29	Woodstock, New York	Tudor
Chávez, Carlos	Violin Concerto	1952-02-29	Mexico City	Viviane Bertolami (violin), OSN – Chávez
Michel Ciry	[chamber-music work]	1952-07-21	Darmstädter Ferienkurse, Germany	[faculty and students of the Ferienkurse]
Cowell, Henry	Symphony No. 7, for chamber orchestra	1952-11-25	Baltimore	Baltimore Little Orchestra – Stewart
Dallapiccola, Luigi	Tartiniana	1952-03-04	Bern, Switzerland	
dall'Oglio, Renzo	Espressioni (5) for orchestra	1952-07-20	Darmstädter Ferienkurse, Germany	Landestheaterorchester Darmstadt – Maderna
Engelmann, Hans Ulrich	Orchester-Phantasie	1952-07-20	Darmstädter Ferienkurse, Germany	Landestheaterorchester Darmstadt – Maderna
Wolfgang Fortner	Isaacs Opferung, oratory scene	1952-10-12	Donaueschingen Festival, Germany	Sudock, Krebs, Rehfuss / SWF Symphony – Rosbaud
Fricker, Peter Racine	Concerto for Cor Anglais and Orchestra	1952-07-20	Darmstädter Ferienkurse, Germany	Hartung / Landestheaterorchester Darmstadt – Maderna
Ginastera, Alberto	Piano Sonata No. 1	1952-11-29	Pittsburgh (ICMF)	Harris
Goeyvaerts, Karel	Violin Concerto No. 2	1952-07-20	Darmstädter Ferienkurse, Germany	Gertler / Landestheaterorchester Darmstadt – Maderna
Hindemith, Paul	Die Harmonie der Welt Symphony	1952-01-25	Basel, Switzerland	Basel Chamber Orchestra – Sacher
Hummel, Bertold	Missa brevis 1951	1952-10-12	Donaueschingen Festiva, Germany	Domchor Freiburg – Stemmer
Husa, Karel	[chamber-music work]	1952-07-21	Darmstädter Ferienkurse, Germany	[faculty and students of the Ferienkurse]
Jolivet, André	Harp Concerto	1952-10-12	Donaueschingen Festival, Germany	Laskine / SWF Symphony – Rosbaud
Klebe, Giselher	Nocturnes (2) for orchestra	1952-07-20	Darmstädter Ferienkurse, Germany	Landestheaterorchester Darmstadt – Maderna
Kubik, Gail	Symphony Concertante [1952 Pulitzer]	1952-01-07	New York City	The Little Orchestra – Scherman
Lokshin, Aleksandr	Hungarian Fantasy for violin and orchestra	1952–?-?	Moscow	Sitkovetsky / USSR Radio Symphony – Sanderling
Maderna, Bruno	Musica su due dimensioni for flute, cymbals and tape	1952-07-21	Darmstädter Ferienkurse, Germany	Gazzelloni, Grano
Malipiero, G. Francesco	Sinfonia dello Zodiaco	1952-01-23	Lausanne, Switzerland	Orchestre de la Suisse Romande – Sanzogno
Martin, Frank	Violin Concerto	1952-01-24	Basel, Switzerland	Schneeberger / Basel Chamber Orchestra – Sacher
Martinů, Bohuslav	Piano Trio No. 3	1952-02-25	New York City	Mannes Trio
Martinů, Bohuslav	Serenade for Two Clarinets and String Trio	1952-01-04	New York City	McGinnis, Cerminara, J. Fuchs, L. Fuchs, Greenhouse
Martinů, Bohuslav	Stowe Pastorals	1952-05-07	Basel, Switzerland	Trapp Family Ensemble
Mennin, Peter	String Quartet No. 2	1952-02-24	New York City	Juilliard Quartet
Messiaen, Olivier	Le merle noir	1952-06-?	Paris	Contestants of the Conservatory's flute competition + Lee
Montsalvatge, Xavier	Cuarteto indiano	1952-05-04	Madrid	National Chamber Music Association
Nono, Luigi	España en el corazón	1952-07-21	Darmstädter Ferienkurse, Germany	Dumaine, Hildebrandt / Ferienkurse, Landestheater Orchestra – Maderna^{1}
Panufnik, Andrzej	Heroic Overture (2nd version)	1952-05-16	Warsaw, Poland	Warsaw Philharmonic – Rowicki
Pettersson, Allan	Concerto for Strings No. 1	1952-04-06	Stockholm	Swedish Radio Symphony – Mann
Prokofiev, Sergei	Symphony-Concerto for cello and orchestra	1952-02-18	Moscow	Rostropovich / Moscow Youth Orchestra – Richter
Prokofiev, Sergei	Symphony No. 7	1952-10-11	Moscow	USSR Radio Symphony – Samosud
Rubbra, Edmund	String Quartet No. 2 in E-flat, Op. 73	1952-05-11	London (Victoria and Albert Museum)	Griller Quartet
Shostakovich, Dmitri	Preludes and Fugues (24) for piano	1952-12-23	Leningrad	Nikolayeva
Stockhausen, Karlheinz	Kreuzspiel	1952-07-21	Darmstädter Ferienkurse, Germany	Grano, Wildgans, Sandt, Rosmann, Maderna, Trumpfheller, Geppert – Stockhausen
Stockhausen, Karlheinz	Spiel	1952-10-11	Donaueschingen Festival, Germany^{2}	SWF Radio Symphony – Rosbaud
Stravinsky, Igor	Cantata	1952-11-11	Los Angeles	Los Angeles Symphony Society – Igor Stravinsky
Togni, Camillo	Omaggio a Bach for two pianos	1952-07-21	Darmstädter Ferienkurse, Germany	Gerd Kämper, Togni
Jacques Wildberger	Quartet for flute, clarinet, violin, and cello	1952-07-21	Darmstädter Ferienkurse, Germany	Mertens, Rosokowsky, Stier, Huth
Zimmermann, Bernd Alois	Oboe Concerto	1952-10-11	Donaueschingen Festival, Germany	Schneider / SWF Symphony – Rosbaud

- ^{1} The ensemble Bruno Maderna conducted comprised both faculty and students of the Ferienkurse and members of the Landestheater Orchestra Darmstadt.
- ^{2} Only the first half of Spiel was performed at Donaueschingen in 1952. The complete score was only first performed in a radio recording made in July 1973 with the SWR Symphony Orchestra, Baden-Baden, conducted by the composer. The first public performance of the complete composition was given by the Berlin Philharmonic on 14 September 1975, also under the composer's baton.

=== Compositions ===
- Jean Barraqué
  - Piano Sonata
- Benjamin Britten – Canticle II: Abraham and Isaac, Op. 51
- John Cage
  - 4′33″
- Carlos Chávez
  - Sinfonía romántica (Symphony No. 4)
- George Crumb
  - String Trio
  - Three Pastoral Pieces
- Luigi Dallapiccola
  - Quaderno musicale di Annalibera, solo piano
- Alberto Ginastera
  - Piano Sonata No. 1
- Carlos Guastavino
  - Suite argentina, ballet
- Dmitry Kabalevsky
  - Piano Concerto No. 3
- Wojciech Kilar
  - Conjured for baritone and seven instruments
  - Quintet for woodwind instruments
  - Suite No. 2 for piano
  - Sonata No. 1 for piano
- Erich Wolfgang Korngold
  - Symphony
- Otto Luening
  - Fantasy in Space for flute and tape
  - Invention in Twelve Notes for flute and tape
  - Low Speed for flute and tape
- Frank Martin
  - Harpsichord Concerto
- Bohuslav Martinů
  - Rhapsody-Concerto for Viola and Orchestra
- Olivier Messiaen
  - Le Merle noir
- Wilhelm Peterson-Berger
  - Canzone for Violin and Piano
- Prokofiev, Sergei
  - Symphony No. 7
- Joaquín Rodrigo
  - Concierto Serenata for Harp and Orchestra
- Edmund Rubbra
  - Viola Concerto
- Dmitri Shostakovich
  - String Quartet No. 5
- Karlheinz Stockhausen
  - Klavierstücke I–IV
  - Punkte [withdrawn, revised in 1962]
  - Schlagquartett
  - Spiel
- Igor Stravinsky
  - Cantata
- Vaughan Williams, Ralph
  - Sinfonia antartica (Symphony No. 7)
- Heitor Villa-Lobos
  - Piano Concerto No. 4
  - Symphony No. 9
- Dag Wirén – Symphony No. 4

== Opera ==
- Franco Alfano – Sakùntala (revision of his 1921 opera La leggenda di Sakùntala)
- Leonard Bernstein – Trouble in Tahiti
- Raymond Chevreuille – Atta Troll
- Mozart Camargo Guarnieri – Pedro Malazarte (comic opera in one act, libretto by Mario de Andrade, premiered in May at the Theatro Municipal in Rio de Janeiro)

== Film ==
- Georges Auric - Moulin Rouge
- Charlie Chaplin - Limelight
- Bernard Herrmann - The Snows of Kilimanjaro
- Alfred Newman - The Prizoner of Zenda
- Alex North - Viva Zapata!
- Miklós Rózsa - Ivanhoe
- Dimitri Tiomkin - High Noon
- Victor Young - The Quiet Man

== Musical theatre ==
- Bet Your Life London production opened at the Hippodrome on February 18 and ran for 362 performances
- Curtain Going Up Broadway production
- The Globe Revue London revue opened on July 10 at the Globe Theatre
- Love from Judy London production opened at the Saville Theatre on September 25 and ran for 594 performances
- New Faces of 1952 Broadway production
- Pal Joey (Richard Rodgers and Lorenz Hart) – Broadway revival of original 1940 production
- Ring Out the Bells London revue opened at the Victoria Palace Theatre on November 12
- Three Wishes for Jamie Broadway production opened at the Mark Hellinger Theatre on March 21 and moved to the Plymouth Theatre on May 27 for a total run of 92 performances
- Two's Company Broadway production
- Wish You Were Here Broadway production

== Musical films ==
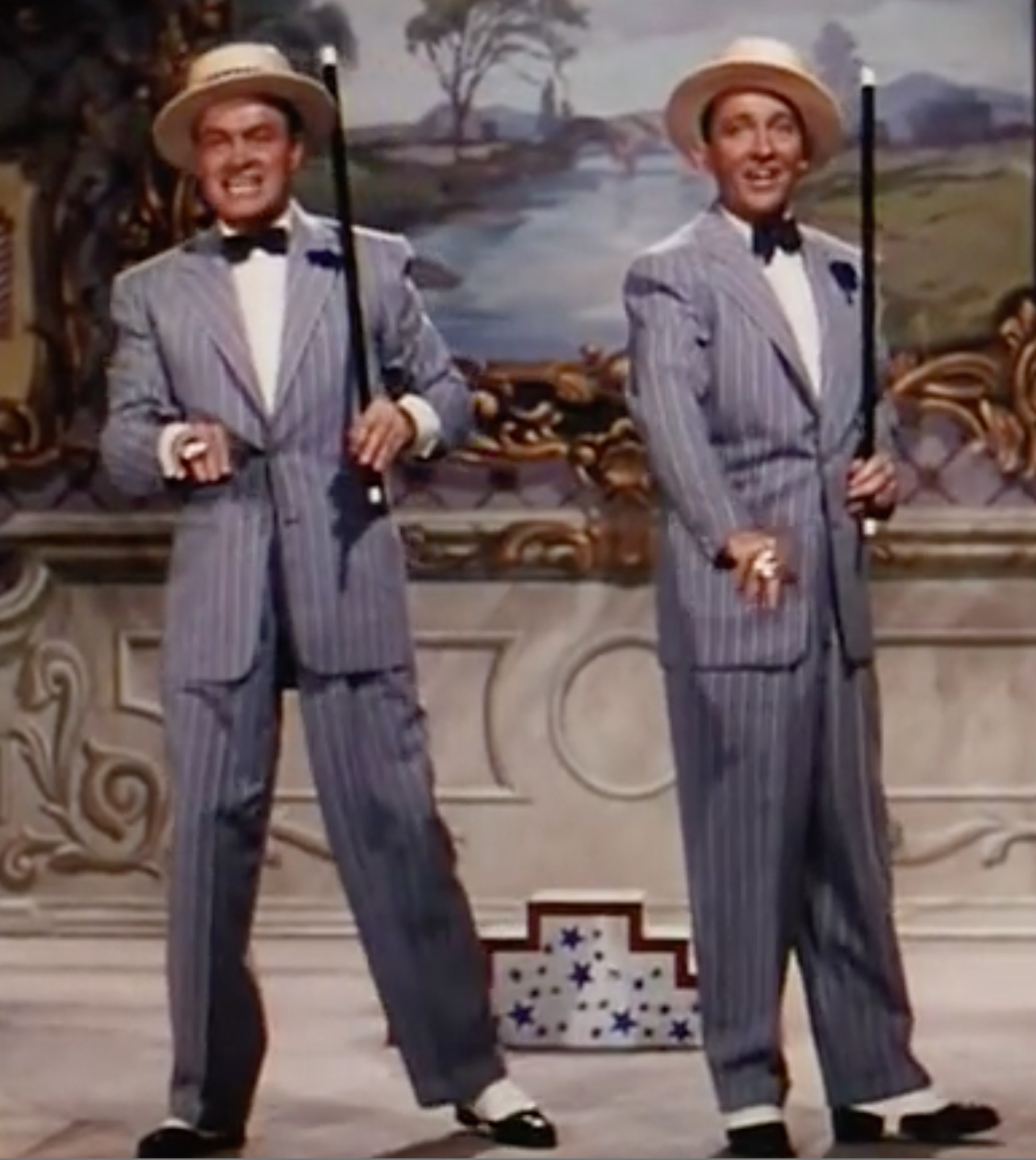
Bob Hope and Bing Crosby On the Road to Bali

- Aaron Slick from Punkin Crick starring Alan Young, Dinah Shore, Robert Merrill and Adele Jergens. Directed by Claude Binyon.
- Affair in Trinidad starring Rita Hayworth and Glenn Ford
- April in Paris starring Doris Day and Ray Bolger
- Because You're Mine starring Mario Lanza and Doretta Morrow
- Bloodhounds of Broadway starring Mitzi Gaynor, Scott Brady and Mitzi Green
- Everything I Have Is Yours starring Marge Champion, Gower Champion and Monica Lewis
- Hans Christian Andersen starring Danny Kaye and Jane Wyman
- Just for You starring Bing Crosby and Jane Wyman
- The Las Vegas Story starring Jane Russell, Victor Mature and Hoagy Carmichael
- Lovely to Look At starring Kathryn Grayson, Red Skelton, Howard Keel, Marge Champion, Gower Champion and Ann Miller
- Meet Danny Wilson starring Frank Sinatra and Shelley Winters
- The Merry Widow starring Lana Turner, Fernando Lamas and Una Merkel
- Road to Bali starring Bing Crosby, Bob Hope and Dorothy Lamour
- She's Working Her Way Through College starring Virginia Mayo and Ronald Reagan
- Sing Along with Me starring Donald Peers, Dodo Watts & Dennis Vance directed by Peter Graham Scott
- Singin' in the Rain starring Gene Kelly, Donald O'Connor and Debbie Reynolds
- Skirts Ahoy! starring Esther Williams, Joan Evans, Vivian Blaine and Keefe Brasselle, and featuring Billy Eckstine, The DeMarco Sisters, Debbie Reynolds and Bobby Van.
- Son of Paleface starring Bob Hope, Jane Russell, Roy Rogers and Trigger
- Where's Charley? starring Ray Bolger and Allyn Ann McLerie
- With a Song in My Heart starring Susan Hayward and Rory Calhoun

== Births ==
- January 2 – Graeme Strachan, Australian singer-songwriter (died 2001)
- January 10 – Scott Thurston, American guitarist and songwriter
- January 15
  - Skay Beilinson, Argentinian guitar player
  - Boris Blank, Swiss musician
  - Melvyn Gale, cellist (Electric Light Orchestra)
- January 17 – Ryuichi Sakamoto, Japanese electronic musician and composer (died 2023)
- January 20 – Paul Stanley, rock guitarist and singer (Kiss)
- January 21 – Cyril and Libbye Hellier, American operatic sopranos
- January 22 – Teddy Gentry, country bass player (Alabama)
- January 25 – Timothy White, American rock journalist (died 2002)
- January 29 – Tommy Ramone, punk rock drummer, producer (The Ramones)
- January 30 – Steve Bartek, new wave rock guitarist (Oingo Boingo)
- February 1 – Jenő Jandó, Hungarian pianist
- February 4 – Jerry Shirley, English rock drummer (Humble Pie)
- February 12 – Michael McDonald, American rock singer-songwriter (The Doobie Brothers)
- February 13 – Ed Gagliardi, American rock bass guitarist (Foreigner)
- February 16 – James Ingram, American R&B singer-songwriter and producer (died 2019)
- February 18 – Juice Newton, American pop and country singer-songwriter and guitarist
- February 20
  - Halvor Haug, Norwegian composer
  - Matti Rantanen, Finnish accordionist
- February 21 – Jean-Jacques Burnel, English rock bass guitarist and vocalist (The Stranglers)
- February 23 – Brad Whitford, American hard rock rhythm guitarist (Aerosmith)
- February 24 – Jadwiga Rappé, Polish contralto (died 2025)
- March 11 – Vince Giordano, American bass saxophonist and band leader for the Nighthawks Orchestra
- March 13 – Wolfgang Rihm, German composer (died 2024)
- March 15 – Howard Devoto, English punk rock singer-songwriter (Buzzcocks, Magazine, Luxuria, ShelleyDevoto)
- March 22 – Jay Dee Daugherty, American rock drummer and songwriter (Patti Smith Group)
- April 2 – Leon Wilkeson, American bassist (Lynyrd Skynyrd)
- April 4 – Gary Moore, Northern Irish blues guitarist and singer (died 2011)
- April 13 – Rosa Passos, Brazilian Bossa Nova singer
- April 17 – Jerry Knight, American vocalist, bassist, songwriter and producer (died 1996)
- April 23 – Narada Michael Walden, American drummer, singer, composer and record producer (Mahavishnu Orchestra)
- April 26 – Ewa Podleś, Polish opera singer (died 2024)
- May 11 – Renaud, composer
- May 14 – David Byrne, singer-songwriter (Talking Heads)
- May 18 – George Strait, country singer, actor and music producer
- May 19 – Barbara Joyce Lomas, funk/disco singer (B. T. Express)
- May 23 – Dillie Keane, cabaret performer
- May 30 – Zoltán Kocsis, composer and pianist (died 2016)
- June 5 – Nicko McBrain, heavy metal drummer (Iron Maiden, Trust, etc.)
- June or July 6 – Jamie Spears, father of singer-songwriters and actresses Jamie Lynne Spears and Britney Spears (estranged)
- June 7 – Royce Campbell, American guitarist, composer and producer
- June 11 – Donnie Van Zant rock guitarist and vocalist (38 Special)
- June 12
  - Junior Brown, country guitarist and singer
  - Oliver Knussen, composer (died 2018)
- June 16 – Gino Vannelli, Canadian singer-songwriter, musician and composer
- June 19 – Jim Johnston, American composer and musician
- June 25
  - Tim Finn, New Zealand singer-songwriter
  - Radka Toneff, Norwegian jazz singer (died 1982)
- July 1
  - Dan Aykroyd, actor (The Blues Brothers)
  - Leon "Ndugu" Chancler, drummer, composer and record producer (died 2018)
  - Timothy J. Tobias, American pianist and composer (died 2006)
- July 2 – Johnny Colla (Huey Lewis and the News)
- July 3 – Laura Branigan, American singer (Gloria) and actress (died 2004)
- July 4 - John Waite, English musician
- July 12 – Philip Taylor Kramer, American bass player (Iron Butterfly) (died 1995)
- July 14 – Bob Casale, American guitarist, keyboard player and producer (Devo) (died 2014)
- July 15 – David Pack, frontman, vocalist and guitarist with rock group Ambrosia
- July 16 – Stewart Copeland, drummer (The Police)
- July 17
  - Nicolette Larson, singer (died 1997)
  - Phoebe Snow, singer-songwriter (died 2011)
- July 19 – Allen Collins, American guitarist and songwriter (Lynyrd Skynyrd, Rossington Collins Band and Allen Collins Band) (died 1990)
- July 22
  - John Rutsey, Canadian drummer (Rush) (died 2008)
  - Janis Siegel, American singer (The Manhattan Transfer)
- July 28 – Glenn A. Baker, Australian music journalist (died 2026)
- July 31 – Reinhard Goebel, German early music conductor and violinist
- August 4 – Moya Brennan, Irish folk harpist and singer (Clannad) (died 2026)
- August 6 – Pat MacDonald, American new wave musician (Timbuk 3)
- August 16 – Gianna Rolandi, American soprano (died 2021)
- August 20 – John Hiatt, guitarist, pianist and singer
- August 21 – Joe Strummer, singer-songwriter (The Clash) (died 2002)
- August 26 – Billy Rush, guitarist (Asbury Jukes)
- August 27 – Laurie Wisefield, English guitarist and vocalist (Wishbone Ash)
- September 4 – Martin Chambers, The Pretenders
- September 9 – Dave Stewart, English musician, songwriter and record producer (Eurythmics)
- September 12
  - Gerry Beckley, rock singer-songwriter (America)
  - Neil Peart, rock drummer & songwriter (Rush) (died 2020)
- September 13 – Randy Jones, singer (Village People)
- September 18 – Dee Dee Ramone, bassist (The Ramones) (died 2002)
- September 19 – Nile Rodgers, American record producer, songwriter, musician, composer, arranger and guitarist (The Honeydrippers, Chic)
- September 22 – Oliver Mtukudzi ("Tuku"), Zimbabwean Afro jazz singer-guitarist (died 2019)
- September 30 – John Lombardo, American musician (10,000 Maniacs, John & Mary)
- October 2 – Janusz Olejniczak, Polish pianist (died 2024)
- October 9 – Sharon Osbourne, English-American television personality, music manager and author wife of Ozzy Osbourne
- October 21 – Miroslav Žbirka, Slovak singer-songwriter
- November 2
  - Maxine Nightingale, singer
  - Alan Winstanley, producer
- November 14 – Johnny A., guitarist and songwriter
- November 17 – Runa Laila, Bangladeshi playback singer and composer
- November 18 - John Parr, English musician and singer-songwriter
- November 20 – Semyon Bychkov, conductor
- November 27 – Bappi Lahiri, Indian film composer
- December 3 – Don Barnes (38 Special)
- December 23 – Hans Abrahamsen, Danish composer
- December 27 – David Knopfler (Dire Straits)

== Deaths ==
- January 9 – Midge Williams, singer
- January 14 – Artur Kapp, Estonian composer (d. 1878)
- January 16 – René Voisin, trumpeter
- January 20 – Arthur Farwell, composer and conductor
- February 13 – Alfred Einstein, musicologist
- March 17 – Percy Wenrich, ragtime composer
- March 22 – Uncle Dave Macon, musician
- April 19 – Steve Conway, British singer (born 1920)
- April 23 – Elisabeth Schumann, operatic soprano
- May 23 – Georg Schumann, German composer (born 1866)
- May 15 – Italo Montemezzi, composer
- June 9 – Adolf Busch, violinist and composer
- June 13 – Emma Eames, operatic soprano
- June 14 – John Kirby, jazz musician
- June 25 – Luke Jordan, blues musician
- July 2 – Henriëtte Hilda Bosmans, Dutch composer and pianist (born 1895)
- July 10 – Rued Langgaard, Danish composer and organist (born 1893)
- September 2 - Nicholas Laucella, concert flautist and composer
- September 6 – Gertrude Lawrence, English actress, singer, dancer
- September 16 – Vesta Tilley, music hall entertainer
- September 18 – Frances Alda, operatic soprano
- September 19 – Nat Ayer, composer
- October 25 – Sergei Bortkiewicz, pianist and composer
- October 26 – Hattie McDaniel
- November 1 – Dixie Lee, singer, dancer and actress, wife of Bing Crosby
- November 4 – Max Adler, violinist
- November 17 – Charles Penrose, music hall performer
- December 25 – Bernardino Molinari, arranger and conductor (born 1880)
- December 26 – Paul Breisach, conductor
- December 28 – Fletcher Henderson, jazz musician
- December 30
  - Willie Brown, blues musician
  - Nakayama Shimpei, songwriter
- date unknown
  - Tryphosa Bates-Batcheller, singer
  - Georgette Harvey, actress and singer
