= Fats Domino discography =

Fats Domino was an American pianist and singer-songwriter. One of the pioneers of rock and roll music, more than 65 million records were sold by Domino. He had eleven Top 10 hits between 1955 and 1960.

During his career, Domino had 35 records in the U.S. Billboard Top 40, and five of his pre-1955 records sold more than a million copies, being certified gold. He was a regular on Global Charts, from 1950 to 1965. His musical style was based on traditional rhythm and blues, accompanied by saxophones, bass, piano, electric guitar, and drums.

His 1949 release "The Fat Man" is widely regarded as the first million-selling rock and roll record. Two of his most famous songs are "Ain't That a Shame" and "Blueberry Hill".

== Albums ==
=== Studio albums ===
Title	Album details (Note: Album details refer to U.S. releases unless otherwise specified.)	Peak chart positions
Title	Album details	US 200
Rock and Rollin' with Fats Domino	Released: March 1956; Label: Imperial (LP-9004); Format: LP (mono)	—
Fats Domino Rock and Rollin'	Released: August 1956; Label: Imperial (LP-9009); Format: LP (mono)	—
This Is Fats Domino!	Released: December 1956; Label: Imperial (LP-9028); Format: LP (mono)	—
Here Stands Fats Domino	Released: March 1957; Label: Imperial (LP-9038); Format: LP (mono)	—
This Is Fats	Released: August 1957; Label: Imperial (LP-9040); Format: LP (mono)	—
The Fabulous Mr. D	Released: August 1958; Label: Imperial (LP-9055); Format: LP (mono)	—
Let's Play Fats Domino	Released: September 1959; Label: Imperial (LP-9065); Format: LP (mono)	—
...A Lot of Dominos!	Released: October 1960; Label: Imperial (LP-9127, LP-12066); Format: LP (mono, stereo)	—
I Miss You So	Released: January 1961; Label: Imperial (LP-9138); Format: LP (mono)	—
Let the Four Winds Blow	Released: July 1961; Label: Imperial (LP-9153, LP-12073); Format: LP (mono, stereo)	—
What a Party!	Released: October 1961; Label: Imperial (LP-9164); Format: LP (mono)	—
Twistin' the Stomp	Released: February 1962; Label: Imperial (LP-9170); Format: LP (mono)	—
Just Domino	Released: September 1962; Label: Imperial (LP-9208); Format: LP (mono)	—
Walking to New Orleans	Released: January 1963; Label: Imperial (LP-9227); Format: LP (mono)	—
Let's Dance with Domino	Released: May 1963; Label: Imperial (LP-9239); Format: LP (mono)	—
Here Comes... Fats Domino	Released: July 1963; Label: ABC-Paramount (ABC 455, ABCS 455); Format: LP (mono, stereo)	130
Here He Comes Again!	Released: August 1963; Label: Imperial (LP-9248); Format: LP (mono)	—
Fats on Fire	Released: 1964; Label: ABC-Paramount (ABC 455, ABCS 455); Format: LP (mono, stereo)	—
Getaway with Fats Domino	Released: 1965; Label: ABC-Paramount (ABC 510, ABCS 510); Format: LP (mono, stereo)	—
Fats Is Back	Released: September 1968; Label: Reprise (RS 6304); Format: LP (stereo)	189
Fats	Released: 1971 (Germany); Label: Reprise (44 113); Format: LP (stereo)	—
Sleeping on the Job	Released: 1979 (Germany); Label: Antagon (ALP 3215); Format: LP (stereo)	—
Christmas Is a Special Day	Released: November 1993; Label: The Right Stuff (T2-27753); Format: CD, cassette	—
Alive and Kickin'	Released: 2006; Not on label; Format: CD	—

=== Live albums ===
Fats Domino '65 (mono) (Las Vegas, 1965-06-13, set 1)

- Released: 1965
- Format: LP
- Label: Mercury MG 21039 (1965)
- Tracks: 12

Fats Domino '65 (stereo) (Las Vegas, 1965-06-13, set 1)

- Released: 1965
- Format: LP
- Label: Mercury SR 61039 (1965)
- Tracks: 12

Attention! Fats Domino! Vol. 2 (Las Vegas, 1965-06-13, set 2)

- Released: 1970
- Format: LP
- Label: Fontana (NL) 6430 100 (1970), Philips (UK) 6336 275 (Live in New York, 1973)
- Tracks: 10

In Concert! (2 LP) (Las Vegas, 1965-06-13)

- Released: 1973
- Format: LP
- Label: Mercury (NL) 6641 497 (1973)
- Tracks: 22

"Hello Josephine": Live at Montreux (Montreux, Switzerland, 1973-05-01)

- Released: November 1974
- Format: LP
- Label: Atlantic (DE) ATL 50 107 (1974)
- Tracks: 14

Live in Europe (Munich and Hof, West Germany, 1977-03-20 and 29)

- Released: 1977
- Format: LP
- Label: United Artists (DE) UAS 30 121 XOT (1977)
- Tracks: 15

Blueberry Hill (Philadelphia, 1969–1971, set 1; three last tracks are by unknown artist)

- Released: 1979
- Format: LP
- Label: Koala AW 14161 (1979)
- Tracks: 10

Lady Madonna (Philadelphia, 1969–1971, set 2)

- Released: 1979
- Format: LP
- Label: Koala AW 14162 (1979)
- Tracks: 9

On Stage! (Philadelphia, 1969–1971, set 3)

- Released: 1983
- Format: LP
- Label: Delta DLP 1127 (1983)
- Tracks: 13

His Greatest Hits (The Universal, Los Angeles, 1985-08-22)

- Released: 1986
- Format: LP
- Label: MCA Records MCA-6170 (1986)
- Tracks: 20

Antoine "Fats" Domino (3 LP) (Galveston and Houston, Texas, 1989-06)

- Released: 1989
- Format: LP
- Label: Tomato (NL) 2696 631 (1989)
- Tracks: 34

Antoine "Fats" Domino (2 CD) (Galveston and Houston, Texas, 1989-06)

- Released: 1989
- Format: CD
- Label: Tomato R2 70391 (1989), Tomato (NL) 2696 632 (1989), Charly (DE) (The Domino Effect, 1998)
- Tracks: 34

It's Not Over 'till: The Fat Man Sings (LP) (New Orleans, Mardi Gras, 1969-02-27)

- Released: 1990
- Format: LP
- Label: Eagle (DE) 33.901006 (1990)
- Tracks: 14

It's Not Over 'till: The Fat Man Sings (CD) (New Orleans, Mardi Gras, 1969-02-27)

- Released: November 1992
- Format: CD
- Label: Eagle (DE) EA 90106 (1992), Ronn 8015 (The Fat Man Sings Live, 1996)
- Tracks: 14

An Evening with Fats Domino (The Universal, Los Angeles, 1985-08-22, complete set)

- Released: 1995
- Format: CD
- Label: Disky (NL) DSPCD 158 (1995)
- Tracks: 26

Live! From the New Orleans Jazz & Heritage Festival 2001

- Released: 1 January 2003
- Format: CD
- Label: Shout! Factory DK 32000 (2003)
- Tracks: 16

Live at The C.C.H. Hamburg 1981

- Released: May 2005
- Format: CD
- Label: Smith&Co SCCD 1113 (2005)
- Tracks: 23

Golden Legends: Fats Domino Live (Galveston and Houston, Texas, 1989-06, different set)

- Released: 2005
- Format: CD
- Label: Madacy (CA) GL2 51859 (2005)
- Tracks: 14

Live from Austin TX (Austin City Limits, 1986-10-22)

- Released: 25 July 2006
- Format: CD
- Label: New West NW6103 (2006)
- Tracks: 17

Antibes 1962 – Live (Juan-les-Pins, Jazz Festival of Antibes, France, 1962-07-17 or 20, limited edition)

- Released: 2017
- Format: LP
- Label: 33 tours avec l'INA (2017)
- Tracks: 11

=== Compilation albums ===
Fats Domino Swings: 12,000,000 Records (Mono Imperial recordings of 1949–1958)

- Released: December 1958
- Format: LP
- Label: Imperial LP-9062 (1958), Imperial/Liberty LP-12091 (1969, electronically created stereo)
- Tracks: 12

Fats Domino Sings Million Record Hits (Mono recordings of 1953–1958, mono mixes of stereo recordings of 1958–1959)

- Released: January 1960
- Format: LP
- Label: Imperial LP-9103 (1959), Imperial LP-12103 (1964), Imperial/Liberty LP-12103 (1970, electronically created stereo)
- Tracks: 12

Million Sellers by Fats (Mono mixes of stereo Imperial recordings of 1958–1962, reached No. 113 nationally.)

- Released: May 1962
- Format: LP
- Label: Imperial LP 9195 (1962), Imperial/Liberty LP-12195 (1969, electronically created stereo)
- Tracks: 12

"Surboum" chez Fats Domino (Mono Imperial recordings of 1958, mono mixes of stereo Imperial recordings of 1958–1960)

- Released: 1962
- Format: LP
- Label: Polydor (FR) 46 855 (1962)
- Tracks: 12

Million Sellers by Fats Domino – Vol. 1 (Mono Imperial recordings, mono mixes of stereo Imperial recordings)

- Released: 1965
- Format: LP
- Label: Liberty (UK) LBL 83023 (1965)
- Tracks: 14

Million Sellers by Fats Domino – Vol. 2 (Mono Imperial recordings, mono mixes of stereo Imperial recordings)

- Released: 1965
- Format: LP
- Label: Liberty (UK) LBL 83024 (1965)
- Tracks: 14

Million Sellers – Vol. 3 (Mono Imperial recordings, mono mixes of stereo Imperial recordings)

- Released: 1968
- Format: LP
- Label: Liberty (UK) LBL 83101E (mono, 1965), Liberty (DE) LBS 83101 (electronically created stereo, 1969)
- Tracks: 14

Fatsound (Mono Imperial recordings of 1949–1956)

- Released: 1968
- Format: LP
- Label: Liberty (UK) LBL 83142E (mono, 1968), Liberty (UK) LBS 83142E (electronically created stereo, 1968), Liberty (DE) LBL 83142 I (Million Sellers – Vol. 4, 13 tracks, mono, 1969)
- Tracks: 14

Stompin' (Mono Imperial recordings of 1949–1955, mono mixes of stereo Imperial recordings of 1960–1962)

- Released: 1968
- Format: LP
- Label: Sunset SUM-1158 (mono, 1968), Sunset SUS-5158 (electronically created stereo, 1968), Sunset (UK) SLS 50 023 E (electronically created stereo, 1968)
- Tracks: 10

Rare Dominos (Mono Imperial recordings of 1950–1953)

- Released: 1968
- Format: LP
- Label: Liberty (UK) LBL 83174 (1968), Ace (UK) CHD 140 (Boogie Woogie Baby, 1985)
- Tracks: 18

Rare Dominos Volume Two (Mono Imperial recordings of 1950–1957)

- Released: 1971
- Format: LP
- Label: United Artists (UK) UAS 29152 (1971)
- Tracks: 18

Fats Domino (Legendary Masters Series) (Mono recordings of 1953–1958, mono mixes of stereo Imperial recordings of 1958–1961)

- Released: 1971
- Format: LP
- Label: United Artists UAS 9958 (US), United Artists UAD 60015/6 (UK) (electronically created stereo)
- Tracks: 28

Greatest Hits (Mono Imperial recordings, mono mixes of stereo Imperial recordings)

- Released: 1986
- Format: CD
- Label: GrandPrix (FR) CD 860705 (1986), Universe (DE) UN 1 020 (1993)
- Tracks: 18

The Best of Fats Domino (Mono Imperial recordings, mono mixes of stereo Imperial recordings)

- Released: 1987
- Format: CD
- Label: EMI America CDP-546581 (1987)
- Tracks: 15

The Fat Man (Mono Imperial recordings)

- Released: 1987
- Format: CD
- Label: World Star Collection WSC 99049 (1987), Universe (DE) UN 1 013 (1990)
- Tracks: 16

My Blue Heaven: The Best of Fats Domino, Volume 1 (Mono and stereo Imperial recordings)

- Released: July 1990
- Format: CD
- Label: EMI CDP-7-92808-2 (1990)
- Tracks: 20

"They Call Me The Fat Man..." – The Legendary Imperial Recordings (4 CD) (Mono and stereo Imperial recordings)

- Released: October 1991
- Format: CD
- Label: EMI E2-7-96784-2 (1991)
- Tracks: 100

Out of New Orleans (8 CD) (Complete Imperial recordings)

- Released: November 1993
- Format: CD
- Label: Bear Family Records BCD 15541 HI (1993)
- Tracks: 222

The EP Collection (Imperial EP's)

- Released: 1 December 1994
- Format: CD
- Label: See for Miles SEECD 416 (1994)
- Tracks: 24

The Early Imperial Singles 1950–1952

- Released: 1996
- Format: CD
- Label: Ace (UK) CDCHD 597 (1996)
- Tracks: 30

The Fat Man (3 CD) (Complete ABC-Paramount & Sea-Saint recordings)

- Released: 1996
- Format: CD
- Label: Disky (NL) SA 872622 & HR 871482 (1996)
- Tracks: 63

The EP Collection Vol. 2 (Imperial EP's)

- Released: 5 August 1997
- Format: CD
- Label: See for Miles SEECD 455 (1997)
- Tracks: 26

The Imperial Singles, Volume 2: 1953–1956

- Released: 1997
- Format: CD
- Label: Ace (UK) CDCHD 649 (1997)
- Tracks: 30

The Imperial Singles, Volume 3: 1956–1958

- Released: 1998
- Format: CD
- Label: Ace (UK) CDCHD 689 (1998)
- Tracks: 30

Walking to New Orleans: 100 Legendary Imperial Recordings (4 CD) (Mono and stereo Imperial recordings; another selection than on 4CD compilation of 1991)

- Released: 12 March 2002
- Format: CD
- Label: Capitol 72435-37374-2-9 (2002)
- Tracks: 100

Sweet Patootie: The Complete Reprise Recordings

- Released: 18 January 2005
- Format: CD
- Label: Rhino Handmade RHM2 7880 (2005)
- Tracks: 29

The Imperial Singles, Volume 4: 1959–1961

- Released: 7 June 2011
- Format: CD
- Label: Ace (UK) CDCHD 1306 (2011)
- Tracks: 26

The Imperial Singles, Volume 5: 1962–1964

- Released: 6 March 2012
- Format: CD
- Label: Ace (UK) CDCHD 1323 (2012)
- Tracks: 26

8 Classic Albums Plus Bonus Tracks (4 CD) (8 Imperial albums and one Imperial compilation)

- Released: 8 July 2013
- Format: CD
- Label: Real Gone (UK) RGMCD008 (2013)
- Tracks: 101

Collected (2 LP)

- Released: 30 September 2018
- Format: CD
- Label: Music on Vinyl MOVLP2185 (2018)
- Tracks: 48

I've Been Around: The Complete Imperial & ABC-Paramount Recordings (12 CD + 1 DVD) (deleted shortly after the initial release and is back in print)

- Released: 4 October 2019
- Format: CD
- Label: Bear Family Productions Ltd. BCD 17579 (2019)
- Tracks: 312

Fats in Stereo 1959–1962: Imperial Hit Singles As & Bs Plus Bonus Stereo LP Tracks (2 CD) (Mono and stereo Imperial recordings)

- Released: 25 October 2019
- Format: CD
- Label: Jasmine (UK) JASCD 855 (2019)
- Tracks: 62

=== Tribute albums ===
That's Fats: A Tribute to Fats Domino (Fats Domino and various artists)

- Released: 1996
- Format: CD
- Label: EMI 7243 8 52697 2 1 (1996)
- Tracks: 18

Goin' Home: A Tribute to Fats Domino (2 CD) (Various artists)

- Released: 2007
- Format: CD
- Label: Vanguard 50999 5 08053 2 7 (2007)
- Tracks: 30

== Singles ==
=== 1949–1959 ===
A-Side	Year	Peak chart positions			B-Side (from same album as A-side except where indicated)	Peak chart positions			Label and catalog number	Album
A-Side	Year	US	US R&B	UK	B-Side (from same album as A-side except where indicated)	US	US R&B	UK	Label and catalog number	Album
"The Fat Man"	1949	—	6	—	"Detroit City Blues" (from Here Stands Fats Domino)	—	—	—	Imperial 5058	Rock and Rollin' with Fats Domino
"Boogie-Woogie Baby"	1950	—	—	—	"Little Bee" (from Here Stands Fats Domino)	—	—	—	Imperial 5065	Non-album track
"Hide Away Blues"	1950	—	—	—	"She's My Baby"	—	—	—	Imperial 5077	Here Stands Fats Domino
"Hey La Bas Boogie"	1950	—	—	—	"Brand New Baby" (from Here Stands Fats Domino)	—	—	—	Imperial 5085	This Is Fats
"Every Night About This Time"	1950	—	5	—	"Korea Blues" (non-album track)	—	—	—	Imperial 5099	Here Stands Fats Domino
"Tired of Crying"	1951	—	—	—	"What's the Matter Baby" (non-album track)	—	—	—	Imperial 5114	Rock and Rollin' with Fats Domino
"Don't You Lie to Me"	1951	—	—	—	"Sometimes I Wonder"	—	—	—	Imperial 5123	Non-album tracks
"Right from Wrong"	1951	—	—	—	"No, No Baby"	—	—	—	Imperial 5138	Non-album tracks
"Rockin' Chair"	1951	—	9	—	"Careless Love" (from Fats Domino Rock and Rollin')	—	—	—	Imperial 5145	Non-album tracks
"I'll Be Gone"	1952	—	—	—	"You Know I Miss You" (from This Is Fats)	—	—	—	Imperial 5167	Here Stands Fats Domino
"Goin' Home"	1952	—	1	—	"Reeling and Rocking" (from This Is Fats Domino!)	—	—	—	Imperial 5180	Rock and Rollin' with Fats Domino
"Poor Poor Me"	1952	—	— (Note: "Poor Poor Me" peaked at number 10 on Billboard's Most Played Juke Box Rhythm & Blues Records chart.)	—	"Trust in Me"	—	—	—	Imperial 5197	This Is Fats Domino!
"How Long"	1952	—	9	—	"Dreaming"	—	—	—	Imperial 5209	Non-album tracks
"Nobody Loves Me"	1953	—	—	—	"Cheatin'" (from Here Stands Fats Domino)	—	—	—	Imperial 5220	Non-album tracks
"Going to the River"	1953	—	2	—	"Mardi Gras In New Orleans" (from The Fabulous Mr. D)	—	—	—	Imperial 5231	Rock and Rollin' with Fats Domino
"Please Don't Leave Me"	1953	—	5	—	"The Girl I Love" (non-album track)	—	—	—	Imperial 5240	Rock and Rollin' with Fats Domino
"Rose Mary"	1953	—	—	—	"You Said You Loved Me"	—	—	—	Imperial 5251	Rock and Rollin' with Fats Domino
"Something's Wrong"	1953	—	6	—	"Don't Leave Me This Way"	—	—	—	Imperial 5262	Non-album tracks
"You Done Me Wrong"	1954	—	10	—	"Little School Girl" (non-album track)	—	—	—	Imperial 5272	This Is Fats Domino!
"Where Did You Stay"	1954	—	—	—	"Baby Please"	—	—	—	Imperial 5283	This Is Fats
"You Can Pack Your Suitcase"	1954	—	—	—	"I Lived My Life" (from Let's Dance with Domino)	—	—	—	Imperial 5301	Here Stands Fats Domino
"Love Me"	1954	—	—	—	"Don't You Hear Me Calling You"	—	—	—	Imperial 5313	This Is Fats
"I Know"	1954	—	—	—	"Thinking of You" (from This Is Fats)	—	—	—	Imperial 5323	Twistin' The Stomp
"Don't You Know"	1955	—	7	—	"Helping Hand"	—	—	—	Imperial 5340	Non-album tracks
"Ain't That a Shame"	1955	10	1	23	"La-La" (from This Is Fats Domino!)	—	—	—	Imperial 5348	Rock and Rollin' with Fats Domino
"All By Myself"	1955	—	1	—	"Troubles of My Own" (from This Is Fats Domino!)	—	—	—	Imperial 5357	Rock and Rollin' with Fats Domino
"Poor Me"	1955	—	1	—	"I Can't Go On" (from The Fabulous Mr. D)	—	6	—	Imperial 5369	Rock and Rollin' with Fats Domino
"Bo Weevil"	1956	35	5	—	"Don't Blame It on Me"	—	9	—	Imperial 5375	Rock and Rollin' with Fats Domino
"I'm in Love Again"	1956	3	1	12	"My Blue Heaven"	19	5	—	Imperial 5386	Fats Domino Rock and Rollin'
"When My Dreamboat Comes Home"	1956	14	2	—	"So Long"	44	5	—	Imperial 5396	Fats Domino Rock and Rollin'
"Blueberry Hill"	1956	2	1	6	"Honey Chile"	—	2	29	Imperial 5407	This Is Fats Domino!
"Blue Monday"	1956	5	1	23	"What's the Reason I'm Not Pleasing You"	50	12	—	Imperial 5417	This Is Fats Domino!
"I'm Walkin'"	1957	4	1	19	"I'm in the Mood for Love"	—	—	—	Imperial 5428	Here Stands Fats Domino
"The Rooster Song"	1957	—	13	—	"My Happiness", "As Time Goes By", "Hey La Bas" (4-song EP)	—	—	—	Imperial 147	This Is Fats
"Valley of Tears"	1957	8	2	25	"It's You I Love"	6	2	—	Imperial 5442	This Is Fats
"When I See You"	1957	29	14	—	"What Will I Tell My Heart" (from The Fabulous Mr. D)	64	12	—	Imperial 5454	Let's Dance with Domino
"Wait and See"	1957	23	7	—	"I Still Love You" (from Fats Domino Sings Million Record Hits)	79	—	—	Imperial 5467	Twistin' the Stomp
"The Big Beat"	1957	26	15	20	"I Want You to Know"	—	—	—	Imperial 5477	The Fabulous Mr. D
"Yes, My Darling"	1958	55	10	—	"Don't You Know I Love You"	—	—	—	Imperial 5492	Let's Dance with Domino
"Sick and Tired"	1958	22	14	26	"No, No" (from Just Domino)	55	14	—	Imperial 5515	The Fabulous Mr. D
"Little Mary"	1958	48	4	—	"Prisoner's Song" (non-album track)	—	—	—	Imperial 5526	The Fabulous Mr. D
"Young School Girl"	1958	92	15	—	"It Must Be Love" (non-album track)	—	—	—	Imperial 5537	The Fabulous Mr. D
"Whole Lotta Loving"	1958	6	2	—	"Coquette" (from What a Party!)	92	26	—	Imperial 5553	Fats Domino Swings
"Telling Lies"	1959	50	13	—	"When the Saints Go Marching In" (from Let's Play Fats Domino)	50	—	—	Imperial 5569	Let's Dance with Domino
"I'm Ready"	1959	16	7	—	"Margie" (from Let's Play Fats Domino)	51	—	18	Imperial 5585	Fats Domino Sings Million Record Hits
"I Want to Walk You Home"	1959	8	1	14	"I'm Gonna Be a Wheel Someday"	17	22	—	Imperial 5606	Let's Play Fats Domino
"Be My Guest"	1959	8	2	11	"I've Been Around"	33	19	—	Imperial 5629	Fats Domino Sings Million Record Hits

=== 1960–1969 ===
A-Side	Year	Peak chart positions			B-Side (from same album as A-side except where indicated)	Peak chart positions			Label and catalog number	Album
A-Side	Year	US	US R&B	UK	B-Side (from same album as A-side except where indicated)	US	US R&B	UK	Label and catalog number	Album
"Country Boy"	1960	25	—	19	"If You Need Me" (from Fats Domino Rock and Rollin)	98	—	—	Imperial 5645	Fats Domino Sings Million Record Hits
"Tell Me That You Love Me"	1960	51	—	—	"Before I Grow Too Old"	84	—	—	Imperial 5660	What a Party!
"Walking to New Orleans"	1960	6	2	19	"Don't Come Knockin'"	21	28	—	Imperial 5675	...A Lot of Dominos!
"Three Nights a Week"	1960	15	8	45	"Put Your Arms Around Me Honey"	58	—	—	Imperial 5687	...A Lot of Dominos!
"My Girl Josephine"	1960	14	7	32	"Natural Born Lover"	38	28	—	Imperial 5704	...A Lot of Dominos!
"Ain't That Just Like a Woman"	1961	33	19	—	"What a Price"	22	7	—	Imperial 5723	I Miss You So
"Shu Rah"	1961	32	—	—	"Fell in Love on Monday" (from I Miss You So)	32	—	—	Imperial 5734	...A Lot of Dominos!
"It Keeps Rainin'"	1961	23	18	49	"I Just Cry" (from Here Comes Fats Domino)	—	—	—	Imperial 5753	I Miss You So
"Let the Four Winds Blow"	1961	15	2	—	"Good Hearted Man"	—	—	—	Imperial 5764	Let the Four Winds Blow
"What a Party"	1961	22	—	43	"Rockin' Bicycle"	83	—	—	Imperial 5779	What a Party!
"I Hear You Knocking"	1961	67	—	—	"Jambalaya" (from Million Sellers By Fats)	30	—	41	Imperial 5796	I Miss You So
"You Win Again"	1962	22	—	—	"Ida Jane" (from Let's Play Fats Domino)	90	—	—	Imperial 5816	Let the Four Winds Blow
"My Real Name"	1962	59	22	—	"My Heart Is Bleeding"	—	—	—	Imperial 5833	Million Sellers by Fats
"Dance with Mr. Domino"	1962	98	—	—	"Nothing New (Same Old Thing)"	77	—	—	Imperial 5863	Just Domino
"Did You Ever See a Dream Walking?"	1962	79	—	—	"Stop the Clock" (from Just Domino)	—	—	—	Imperial 5875	What a Party!
"Won't You Come on Back"	1962	—	—	—	"Hands Across the Table" (from Let's Play Fats Domino)	—	—	—	Imperial 5895	Let the Four Winds Blow
"Hum Diddy Doo"	1963	—	—	—	"Those Eyes"	—	—	—	Imperial 5909	Just Domino
"You Always Hurt the One You Love"	1963	—	—	—	"Trouble Blues" (from Let the Four Winds Blow)	—	—	—	Imperial 5937	...A Lot of Dominos!
"True Confession"	1963	—	—	—	"Isle of Capri" (from I Miss You So)	—	—	—	Imperial 5959	Let's Dance with Domino
"One Night"	1963	—	—	—	"I Can't Go on This Way" (non-album track)	—	—	—	Imperial 5980	Let the Four Winds Blow
"There Goes (My Heart Again)"	1963	59	—	—	"Can't Go On Without You"	—	—	—	ABC 10444	Here Comes Fats Domino
"When I'm Walking (Let Me Walk)"	1963	—	—	—	"I've Got a Right to Cry"	—	—	—	ABC 10475	Here Comes Fats Domino
"Red Sails in the Sunset"	1963	35	24	34	"Song for Rosemary"	—	—	—	ABC 10484	Here Comes Fats Domino
"I Can't Give You Anything But Love"	1963	—	—	—	"Goin' Home" (from Rock and Rollin' with Fats Domino)	—	—	—	Imperial 66005	Let the Four Winds Blow
"Who Cares"	1963	63	27	—	"Just a Lonely Man" (from Here Comes Fats Domino)	—	—	—	ABC 10512	Non-album track
"Your Cheatin' Heart"	1964	—	—	—	"When I Was Young" (from I Miss You So)	—	—	—	Imperial 66016	Let the Four Winds Blow
"Lazy Lady"	1964	86	34	—	"I Don't Want to Set the World on Fire" (from Fats on Fire)	—	—	—	ABC 10531	Non-album tracks
"If You Don't Know What Love Is"	1964	—	—	—	"Something You Got Baby"	—	—	—	ABC 10545	Non-album tracks
"Mary, Oh Mary"	1964	—	—	—	"Packin' Up" (non-album track)	—	—	—	ABC 10567	Fats on Fire
"Sally Was a Good Old Girl"	1964	99	—	—	"For You"	—	—	—	ABC 10584	Non-album tracks
"Heartbreak Hill"	1964	99	—	—	"Kansas City"	—	—	—	ABC 10596	Getaway with Fats Domino
"Why Don't You Do Right"	1965	—	—	—	"Wigs"	—	—	—	ABC 10631	Getaway with Fats Domino
"Let Me Call You Sweetheart"	1965	—	—	—	"Goodnight Sweetheart"	—	—	—	ABC 10644	Non-album tracks
"I Left My Heart in San Francisco"	1965	—	—	—	"I Done Got Over It"	—	—	—	Mercury 72463	Non-album tracks
"What's That You Got?"	1965	—	—	—	"It's Never Too Late"	—	—	—	Mercury 72485	Non-album tracks
"Work My Way Up Steady"	1967	—	—	—	"The Lady in Black"	—	—	—	Broadmoor 104	Fats
"Big Mouth"	1968	—	—	—	"Wait 'Til It Happens to You"	—	—	—	Broadmoor 105	Fats
"Honest Papas Love Their Mamas Better"	1968	—	—	—	"One for the Highway"	—	—	—	Reprise 0696	Fats Is Back
"Lady Madonna"	1968	100	—	—	"One for the Highway"	—	—	—	Reprise 0763	Fats Is Back
"Lovely Rita"	1968	—	—	—	"Wait 'Til It Happens to You"	—	—	—	Reprise 0775	Fats Is Back
"Everybody's Got Something to Hide Except Me and My Monkey"	1969	—	—	—	"So Swell When You're Well" (from Fats Is Back)	—	—	—	Reprise 0843	Non-album track

=== 1970–1985 ===
A-Side	Year	B-Side (from same album as A-side except where indicated)	Peak chart positions	Label and catalog number	Album
A-Side	Year	B-Side (from same album as A-side except where indicated)	US Country	Label and catalog number	Album
"Make Me Belong to You"	1970	"Have You Seen My Baby?" (non-album track)	—	Reprise 0891	Fats Is Back
"New Orleans Ain't the Same"	1970	"Sweet Patootie"	—	Reprise 0944	Non-album tracks
"Whiskey Heaven"	1980	"Beers to You" (performed by The Texas Opera Company)	51	Warner Bros. WBS49610	The Sound Track Music From Clint Eastwood's Any Which Way You Can
"If I Get Rich"	1980	"My Old Time Use to Be"	—	FD Records WB 1200 C/D	Fats Domino 1980 (reissue of Sleeping On The Job)
"My Toot Toot – One (Country)" (with Doug Kershaw)	1985	"My Toot Toot – Three (Rock)" (with Doug Kershaw)	—	Toot Toot Recordz TT 001	Non-album tracks

=== Billboard Year-End performances ===
Year	Song	Year-End Position
1956	"I'm in Love Again"	25
1956	"Blueberry Hill"	41
1957	"I'm Walkin'"	38
1957	"Blueberry Hill"	48
1957	"Blue Monday"	50
1959	"I Want to Walk You Home"	68
1960	"Walking to New Orleans"	72
1961	"Let the Four Winds Blow"	82
