= List of Billboard number-one singles of 1952 =

This is a list of number-one songs in the United States during the year 1952 according to Billboard magazine. Prior to the creation of the Billboard Hot 100, Billboard published multiple singles charts each week. In 1952, the following four charts were produced:

- Best Sellers in Stores – ranked the biggest selling singles in retail stores, as reported by merchants surveyed throughout the country.
- Most Played by Jockeys – ranked the most played songs on United States radio stations, as reported by radio disc jockeys and radio stations.
- Most Played in Jukeboxes – ranked the most played songs in jukeboxes across the United States.
- Honor Roll of Hits – a composite ten-position song chart which combined data from the three charts above along with three other component charts. It served as The Billboard's lead chart until the introduction of the Hot 100 in 1958 and would remain in print until 1963.

Note: In the issues dated January 5, June 7, and November 29, The Billboard reported a tie for the number-one single on one of its charts.

Issue date	Best Sellers in Stores	Most Played by Jockeys	Most Played in Jukeboxes	Honor Roll of Hits	Ref.
January 5	"Cry"; Johnnie Ray with The Four Lads	"Cry"; Johnnie Ray with The Four Lads "(It's No) Sin"; Eddy Howard and His Orchestra	"Slow Poke"; Pee Wee King and His Golden West Cowboys with Redd Stewart	"(It's No) Sin"	
January 12	"Cry"; Johnnie Ray with The Four Lads	"Cry"; Johnnie Ray with The Four Lads	"Slow Poke"; Pee Wee King and His Golden West Cowboys with Redd Stewart	"Slow Poke"	
January 19	"Cry"; Johnnie Ray with The Four Lads	"Cry"; Johnnie Ray with The Four Lads	"Slow Poke"; Pee Wee King and His Golden West Cowboys with Redd Stewart	"Slow Poke"	
January 26	"Cry"; Johnnie Ray with The Four Lads	"Cry"; Johnnie Ray with The Four Lads	"Cry"; Johnnie Ray with The Four Lads	"Cry"	
February 2	"Cry"; Johnnie Ray with The Four Lads	"Cry"; Johnnie Ray with The Four Lads	"Cry"; Johnnie Ray with The Four Lads	"Cry"	
February 9	"Cry"; Johnnie Ray with The Four Lads	"Cry"; Johnnie Ray with The Four Lads	"Cry"; Johnnie Ray with The Four Lads	"Cry"	
February 16	"Cry"; Johnnie Ray with The Four Lads	"Cry"; Johnnie Ray with The Four Lads	"Cry"; Johnnie Ray with The Four Lads	"Cry"	
February 23	"Cry"; Johnnie Ray with The Four Lads	"Cry"; Johnnie Ray with The Four Lads	"Cry"; Johnnie Ray with The Four Lads	"Cry"	
March 1	"Cry"; Johnnie Ray with The Four Lads	"Cry"; Johnnie Ray with The Four Lads	"Cry"; Johnnie Ray with The Four Lads	"Cry"	
March 8	"Cry"; Johnnie Ray with The Four Lads	"Cry"; Johnnie Ray with The Four Lads	"Cry"; Johnnie Ray with The Four Lads	"Cry"	
March 15	"Wheel of Fortune"; Kay Starr with Orchestra Conducted by Harold Mooney	"Wheel of Fortune"; Kay Starr with Orchestra Conducted by Harold Mooney	"Cry"; Johnnie Ray with The Four Lads	"Wheel of Fortune"	
March 22	"Wheel of Fortune"; Kay Starr with Orchestra Conducted by Harold Mooney	"Wheel of Fortune"; Kay Starr with Orchestra Conducted by Harold Mooney	"Cry"; Johnnie Ray with The Four Lads	"Wheel of Fortune"	
March 29	"Wheel of Fortune"; Kay Starr with Orchestra Conducted by Harold Mooney	"Wheel of Fortune"; Kay Starr with Orchestra Conducted by Harold Mooney	"Wheel of Fortune"; Kay Starr with Orchestra Conducted by Harold Mooney	"Wheel of Fortune"	
April 5	"Wheel of Fortune"; Kay Starr with Orchestra Conducted by Harold Mooney	"Wheel of Fortune"; Kay Starr with Orchestra Conducted by Harold Mooney	"Wheel of Fortune"; Kay Starr with Orchestra Conducted by Harold Mooney	"Wheel of Fortune"	
April 12	"Wheel of Fortune"; Kay Starr with Orchestra Conducted by Harold Mooney	"Wheel of Fortune"; Kay Starr with Orchestra Conducted by Harold Mooney	"Wheel of Fortune"; Kay Starr with Orchestra Conducted by Harold Mooney	"Wheel of Fortune"	
April 19	"Wheel of Fortune"; Kay Starr with Orchestra Conducted by Harold Mooney	"Wheel of Fortune"; Kay Starr with Orchestra Conducted by Harold Mooney	"Wheel of Fortune"; Kay Starr with Orchestra Conducted by Harold Mooney	"Wheel of Fortune"	
April 26	"Wheel of Fortune"; Kay Starr with Orchestra Conducted by Harold Mooney	"Wheel of Fortune"; Kay Starr with Orchestra Conducted by Harold Mooney	"Wheel of Fortune"; Kay Starr with Orchestra Conducted by Harold Mooney	"Wheel of Fortune"	
May 3	"Wheel of Fortune"; Kay Starr with Orchestra Conducted by Harold Mooney	"Wheel of Fortune"; Kay Starr with Orchestra Conducted by Harold Mooney	"Wheel of Fortune"; Kay Starr with Orchestra Conducted by Harold Mooney	"Wheel of Fortune"	
May 10	"Wheel of Fortune"; Kay Starr with Orchestra Conducted by Harold Mooney	"Wheel of Fortune"; Kay Starr with Orchestra Conducted by Harold Mooney	"Wheel of Fortune"; Kay Starr with Orchestra Conducted by Harold Mooney	"Wheel of Fortune"	
May 17	"Blue Tango"; Leroy Anderson "Pops" Concert Orchestra	"Kiss of Fire"; Georgia Gibbs with Orchestra conducted by Glenn Osser	"Wheel of Fortune"; Kay Starr with Orchestra Conducted by Harold Mooney	"Blue Tango"	
May 24	"Blue Tango"; Leroy Anderson "Pops" Concert Orchestra	"Kiss of Fire"; Georgia Gibbs with Orchestra conducted by Glenn Osser	"A Guy Is a Guy"; Doris Day with Paul Weston and his Orchestra	"Blue Tango"	
May 31	"Blue Tango"; Leroy Anderson "Pops" Concert Orchestra	"Kiss of Fire"; Georgia Gibbs with Orchestra conducted by Glenn Osser	"Wheel of Fortune"; Kay Starr with Orchestra Conducted by Harold Mooney	"Blue Tango"	
June 7	"Blue Tango"; Leroy Anderson "Pops" Concert Orchestra "Here in My Heart"; Al Martino with Orchestra under the direction of Monty Kelly	"Kiss of Fire"; Georgia Gibbs with Orchestra conducted by Glenn Osser	"Wheel of Fortune"; Kay Starr with Orchestra Conducted by Harold Mooney	"Blue Tango"	
June 14	"Blue Tango"; Leroy Anderson "Pops" Concert Orchestra	"Kiss of Fire"; Georgia Gibbs with Orchestra conducted by Glenn Osser	"Kiss of Fire"; Georgia Gibbs with Orchestra conducted by Glenn Osser	"Kiss of Fire"	
June 21	"Here in My Heart"; Al Martino with Orchestra under the direction of Monty Kelly	"Kiss of Fire"; Georgia Gibbs with Orchestra conducted by Glenn Osser	"Kiss of Fire"; Georgia Gibbs with Orchestra conducted by Glenn Osser	"Kiss of Fire"	
June 28	"Here in My Heart"; Al Martino with Orchestra under the direction of Monty Kelly	"Here in My Heart"; Al Martino with Orchestra under the direction of Monty Kelly	"Kiss of Fire"; Georgia Gibbs with Orchestra conducted by Glenn Osser	"Kiss of Fire"	
July 5	"Delicado"; Percy Faith and His Orchestra with Stan Freeman	"Kiss of Fire"; Georgia Gibbs with Orchestra conducted by Glenn Osser	"Kiss of Fire"; Georgia Gibbs with Orchestra conducted by Glenn Osser	"Kiss of Fire"	
July 12	"Auf Wiederseh'n, Sweetheart"; Vera Lynn with Soldiers and Airmen of Her Majesty's Forces and Roland Shaw	"Here in My Heart"; Al Martino with Orchestra under the direction of Monty Kelly	"Kiss of Fire"; Georgia Gibbs with Orchestra conducted by Glenn Osser	"Kiss of Fire"	
July 19	"Auf Wiederseh'n, Sweetheart"; Vera Lynn with Soldiers and Airmen of Her Majesty's Forces and Roland Shaw	"Here in My Heart"; Al Martino with Orchestra under the direction of Monty Kelly	"Kiss of Fire"; Georgia Gibbs with Orchestra conducted by Glenn Osser	"Kiss of Fire"	
July 26	"Auf Wiederseh'n, Sweetheart"; Vera Lynn with Soldiers and Airmen of Her Majesty's Forces and Roland Shaw	"Auf Wiederseh'n, Sweetheart"; Vera Lynn with Soldiers and Airmen of Her Majesty's Forces and Roland Shaw	"Half as Much"; Rosemary Clooney with Percy Faith and His Orchestra	"Auf Wiederseh'n Sweetheart"	
August 2	"Auf Wiederseh'n, Sweetheart"; Vera Lynn with Soldiers and Airmen of Her Majesty's Forces and Roland Shaw	"Auf Wiederseh'n, Sweetheart"; Vera Lynn with Soldiers and Airmen of Her Majesty's Forces and Roland Shaw	"Half as Much"; Rosemary Clooney with Percy Faith and His Orchestra	"Auf Wiederseh'n Sweetheart"	
August 9	"Auf Wiederseh'n, Sweetheart"; Vera Lynn with Soldiers and Airmen of Her Majesty's Forces and Roland Shaw	"Auf Wiederseh'n, Sweetheart"; Vera Lynn with Soldiers and Airmen of Her Majesty's Forces and Roland Shaw	"Auf Wiederseh'n, Sweetheart"; Vera Lynn with Soldiers and Airmen of Her Majesty's Forces and Roland Shaw	"Auf Wiederseh'n Sweetheart"	
August 16	"Auf Wiederseh'n, Sweetheart"; Vera Lynn with Soldiers and Airmen of Her Majesty's Forces and Roland Shaw	"Auf Wiederseh'n, Sweetheart"; Vera Lynn with Soldiers and Airmen of Her Majesty's Forces and Roland Shaw	"Auf Wiederseh'n, Sweetheart"; Vera Lynn with Soldiers and Airmen of Her Majesty's Forces and Roland Shaw	"Auf Wiederseh'n Sweetheart"	
August 23	"Auf Wiederseh'n, Sweetheart"; Vera Lynn with Soldiers and Airmen of Her Majesty's Forces and Roland Shaw	"Auf Wiederseh'n, Sweetheart"; Vera Lynn with Soldiers and Airmen of Her Majesty's Forces and Roland Shaw	"Auf Wiederseh'n, Sweetheart"; Vera Lynn with Soldiers and Airmen of Her Majesty's Forces and Roland Shaw	"Auf Wiederseh'n Sweetheart"	
August 30	"Auf Wiederseh'n, Sweetheart"; Vera Lynn with Soldiers and Airmen of Her Majesty's Forces and Roland Shaw	"Auf Wiederseh'n, Sweetheart"; Vera Lynn with Soldiers and Airmen of Her Majesty's Forces and Roland Shaw	"Auf Wiederseh'n, Sweetheart"; Vera Lynn with Soldiers and Airmen of Her Majesty's Forces and Roland Shaw	"Auf Wiederseh'n Sweetheart"	
September 6	"Auf Wiederseh'n, Sweetheart"; Vera Lynn with Soldiers and Airmen of Her Majesty's Forces and Roland Shaw	"Wish You Were Here"; Eddie Fisher with Hugo Winterhalter and his Orchestra	"Half as Much"; Rosemary Clooney with Percy Faith and His Orchestra	"Auf Wiederseh'n Sweetheart"	
September 13	"You Belong to Me"; Jo Stafford with Paul Weston and his Orchestra	"You Belong to Me"; Jo Stafford with Paul Weston and his Orchestra	"You Belong to Me"; Jo Stafford with Paul Weston and his Orchestra	"You Belong to Me"	
September 20	"You Belong to Me"; Jo Stafford with Paul Weston and his Orchestra	"You Belong to Me"; Jo Stafford with Paul Weston and his Orchestra	"You Belong to Me"; Jo Stafford with Paul Weston and his Orchestra	"You Belong to Me"	
September 27	"You Belong to Me"; Jo Stafford with Paul Weston and his Orchestra	"You Belong to Me"; Jo Stafford with Paul Weston and his Orchestra	"I Went to Your Wedding"; Patti Page with Orchestra Conducted by Jack Rael	"You Belong to Me"	
October 4	"You Belong to Me"; Jo Stafford with Paul Weston and his Orchestra	"You Belong to Me"; Jo Stafford with Paul Weston and his Orchestra	"I Went to Your Wedding"; Patti Page with Orchestra Conducted by Jack Rael	"You Belong to Me"	
October 11	"You Belong to Me"; Jo Stafford with Paul Weston and his Orchestra	"You Belong to Me"; Jo Stafford with Paul Weston and his Orchestra	"I Went to Your Wedding"; Patti Page with Orchestra Conducted by Jack Rael	"You Belong to Me"	
October 18	"I Went to Your Wedding"; Patti Page with Orchestra Conducted by Jack Rael	"You Belong to Me"; Jo Stafford with Paul Weston and his Orchestra	"I Went to Your Wedding"; Patti Page with Orchestra Conducted by Jack Rael	"You Belong to Me"	
October 25	"I Went to Your Wedding"; Patti Page with Orchestra Conducted by Jack Rael	"You Belong to Me"; Jo Stafford with Paul Weston and his Orchestra	"I Went to Your Wedding"; Patti Page with Orchestra Conducted by Jack Rael	"You Belong to Me"	
November 1	"I Went to Your Wedding"; Patti Page with Orchestra Conducted by Jack Rael	"You Belong to Me"; Jo Stafford with Paul Weston and his Orchestra	"I Went to Your Wedding"; Patti Page with Orchestra Conducted by Jack Rael	"You Belong to Me"	
November 8	"I Went to Your Wedding"; Patti Page with Orchestra Conducted by Jack Rael	"You Belong to Me"; Jo Stafford with Paul Weston and his Orchestra	"I Went to Your Wedding"; Patti Page with Orchestra Conducted by Jack Rael	"You Belong to Me"	
November 15	"I Went to Your Wedding"; Patti Page with Orchestra Conducted by Jack Rael	"I Went to Your Wedding"; Patti Page with Orchestra Conducted by Jack Rael	"I Went to Your Wedding"; Patti Page with Orchestra Conducted by Jack Rael	"You Belong to Me"	
November 22	"It's in the Book (Parts 1 & 2)"; Johnny Standley with Horace Heidt and His Musical Knights	"You Belong to Me"; Jo Stafford with Paul Weston and his Orchestra	"I Went to Your Wedding"; Patti Page with Orchestra Conducted by Jack Rael	"You Belong to Me"	
November 29	"It's in the Book (Parts 1 & 2)"; Johnny Standley with Horace Heidt and His Magical Knights "Why Don't You Believe Me"; Joni James with Orchestra conducted by Lew Douglas	"You Belong to Me"; Jo Stafford with Paul Weston and his Orchestra	"I Went to Your Wedding"; Patti Page with Orchestra Conducted by Jack Rael	"You Belong to Me"	
December 6	"Why Don't You Believe Me"; Joni James with Orchestra conducted by Lee Douglas	"You Belong to Me"; Jo Stafford with Paul Weston and his Orchestra	"The Glow-Worm"; Mills Brothers and Hal McIntyre and His Orchestra	"Why Don't You Believe Me?"	
December 13	"Why Don't You Believe Me"; Joni James with Orchestra conducted by Lee Douglas	"Why Don't You Believe Me"; Joni James with Orchestra conducted by Lee Douglas	"The Glow-Worm"; Mills Brothers and Hal McIntyre and His Orchestra	"Why Don't You Believe Me?"	
December 20	"Why Don't You Believe Me"; Joni James with Orchestra conducted by Lee Douglas	"Why Don't You Believe Me"; Joni James with Orchestra conducted by Lee Douglas	"The Glow-Worm"; Mills Brothers and Hal McIntyre and His Orchestra	"Why Don't You Believe Me?"	
December 27	"I Saw Mommy Kissing Santa Claus"; Jimmy Boyd with The Norman Luboff Choir	"Why Don't You Believe Me"; Joni James with Orchestra conducted by Lee Douglas	"Why Don't You Believe Me"; Joni James with Orchestra conducted by Lee Douglas	"Why Don't You Believe Me?"	

== See also ==
- 1952 in music
- List of Cash Box Best Sellers number-one singles of 1952
