= Rantanen =

Rantanen is a Finnish surname of Virtanen type derived from the word ranta. Notable people with the surname include:

- Amanda Rantanen (born 1998), Finnish footballer
- Anna-Kaisa Rantanen (born 1978), Finnish football midfielder
- Anssi Rantanen (born 1982), Finnish ice hockey player
- Daniel Rantanen (born 1998), Finnish footballer
- Eelis Rantanen (1879–1946), Finnish schoolteacher and politician
- Frans Rantanen (1874–1921), Finnish construction worker and politician
- Heli Rantanen (born 1970), Finnish javelin thrower
- Jari Rantanen (born 1961), Finnish footballer
- Jarmo Rantanen, Finnish politician
- Joonas Rantanen (born 1987), Finnish football manager
- Kaarlo Rantanen (born 1988), Finnish footballer
- Marko Rantanen (born 1975), Finnish ice hockey goaltender
- Mari Rantanen (born 1976), Finnish politician
- Matti Rantanen, multiple people
- Merja Rantanen (born 1980), Finnish orienteering competitor
- Mikko Rantanen (born 1996), Finnish ice hockey player
- Mirka Rantanen (born 1971), Finnish musician
- Paavo Rantanen (1934–2026), former Finnish Foreign Ministry official, who was briefly the Minister of Foreign Affairs
- Pasi Rantanen (born 1969), Finnish singer
- Piritta Rantanen (born 1979), Finnish politician
- Rami Rantanen (born 1968), Finnish football coach and former midfielder
- Samuli Rantanen (1861–1918), Finnish farmer and politician
- Seppo Rantanen (born 1963), Finnish cross-country skier
- Siiri Rantanen (1924–2023), Finnish cross-country skier
- Tuomas Rantanen (born 1972), Finnish musician
- Veikko Rantanen (1932–2014), Finnish wrestler
- Vesa Rantanen (born 1975), Finnish pole vaulter
- Yrjö Rantanen (1950–2021), Finnish chess grandmaster

== See also ==
- Ranta, the correspondint Laine type surname
