= List of Cash Box Best Sellers number-one singles of 1952 =

These are the songs that reached number one on the Top 50 Best Sellers chart in 1952 as published by Cash Box magazine. Until October 25, 1952, artists were not specified in the charts of this period so songs may represent more than one version. The artist who most popularized each song is listed. Beginning October 25, Cash Box began tracking specific versions of songs and thus began listing the artists.

Issue date	Song	Artist
January 5	"(It's No) Sin"	Eddy Howard
January 12	"Slow Poke"	(several different versions)
January 19	"Slow Poke"	(several different versions)
January 26	"Slow Poke"	(several different versions)
February 2	"Cry"	Johnnie Ray
February 9	"Cry"	Johnnie Ray
February 16	"Cry"	Johnnie Ray
February 23	"Cry"	Johnnie Ray
March 1	"Cry"	Johnnie Ray
March 8	"Cry"	Johnnie Ray
March 15	"Cry"	Johnnie Ray
March 22	"Cry"	Johnnie Ray
March 29	"Wheel of Fortune"	Kay Starr
April 5	"Wheel of Fortune"	Kay Starr
April 12	"Wheel of Fortune"	Kay Starr
April 19	"Blue Tango"	Leroy Anderson
April 26	"Blue Tango"	Leroy Anderson
May 3	"Blue Tango"	Leroy Anderson
May 10	"Wheel of Fortune"	Kay Starr
May 17	"Blue Tango"	Leroy Anderson
May 24	"Blue Tango"	Leroy Anderson
May 31	"Kiss of Fire"	Georgia Gibbs
June 7	"Kiss of Fire"	Georgia Gibbs
June 14	"Kiss of Fire"	Georgia Gibbs
June 21	"Kiss of Fire"	Georgia Gibbs
June 28	"Kiss of Fire"	Georgia Gibbs
July 5	"Kiss of Fire"	Georgia Gibbs
July 12	"Kiss of Fire"	Georgia Gibbs
July 19	"Kiss of Fire"	Georgia Gibbs
July 26	"Auf Wiederseh'n, Sweetheart"	Vera Lynn
August 2	"Auf Wiederseh'n, Sweetheart"	Vera Lynn
August 9	"Auf Wiederseh'n, Sweetheart"	Vera Lynn
August 16	"Auf Wiederseh'n, Sweetheart"	Vera Lynn
August 23	"Auf Wiederseh'n, Sweetheart"	Vera Lynn
August 30	"Auf Wiederseh'n, Sweetheart"	Vera Lynn
September 6	"Auf Wiederseh'n, Sweetheart"	Vera Lynn
September 13	"Auf Wiederseh'n, Sweetheart"	Vera Lynn
September 20	"Auf Wiederseh'n, Sweetheart"	Vera Lynn
September 27	"You Belong to Me"	Jo Stafford
October 4	"You Belong to Me"	Jo Stafford
October 11	"You Belong to Me"	Jo Stafford
October 18	"You Belong to Me"	Jo Stafford
October 25	"I Went to Your Wedding"	Patti Page
November 1	"I Went to Your Wedding"	Patti Page
November 8	"I Went to Your Wedding"	Patti Page
November 15	"I Went to Your Wedding"	Patti Page
November 22	"I Went to Your Wedding"	Patti Page
November 29	"I Went to Your Wedding"	Patti Page
December 6	"The Glow-Worm"	The Mills Brothers
December 13	"Why Don't You Believe Me"	Joni James
December 20	"Why Don't You Believe Me"	Joni James
December 27	"Why Don't You Believe Me"	Joni James

== See also ==
- 1952 in music
- List of Billboard number-one singles of 1952
