= Piano Concerto No. 4 =

Piano Concerto No. 4 may refer to:

- Piano Concerto No. 4 (Beethoven)
- Piano Concerto No. 4 (Mozart)
- Piano Concerto No. 4 (Prokofiev)
- Piano Concerto No. 4 (Rachmaninoff)
- Piano Concerto No. 4 (Ries)
- Piano Concerto No. 4 (Rorem)
- Piano Concerto No. 4 (Rubinstein)
- Piano Concerto No. 4 (Saint-Saëns)
- Piano Concerto No. 4 (Villa-Lobos)
