= How Long Has This Been Going On (disambiguation) =

"How Long Has This Been Going On?" is a 1927 song by George and Ira Gershwin for the musical Funny Face but instead introduced in the musical Rosalie.

How Long Has This Been Going On may also refer to:

- "How Long" (Ace song) from 1974, and the chorus of which is "How long / has this been going on?"
- How Long Has This Been Going On? (Sarah Vaughan album) from 1978
- How Long Has This Been Going On (Van Morrison album) from 1996
- "How Long" (Charlie Puth song) from 2017, and the chorus of which is "How long has this been going on? You've been creepin' 'round on me."

== See also ==
- How Long (disambiguation)
