= When I See You (disambiguation) =

"When I See You" is a song by Macy Gray.

When I See You may also refer to:

- "When I See U", a 2006 song by Fantasia
- "Blinded (When I See You)", a 2003 song by Third Eye Blind
- "When I See You", a 2010 song by Day of Fire from Losing All
- "When I See You", a 2010 song by El DeBarge from Second Chance
- "When I See You", a 1957 song by Fats Domino
- "When I See You", a 2008 song by Prodigy from H.N.I.C. Pt. 2
- "When I See You", a 1981 song by Thompson Twins from A Product Of... (Participation)
- "When I See You Remix", a 2021 song by Foolio
