= Matti Rantanen =

Matti Rantanen may refer to:

- Matti Rantanen (accordionist) (born 1952), Finnish accordionist
- Matti Rantanen (chess player) (1911–1996), Finnish chess master
- Matti Rantanen (rally driver) (born 1981), Finnish rally driver
