= Valdir Azevedo =

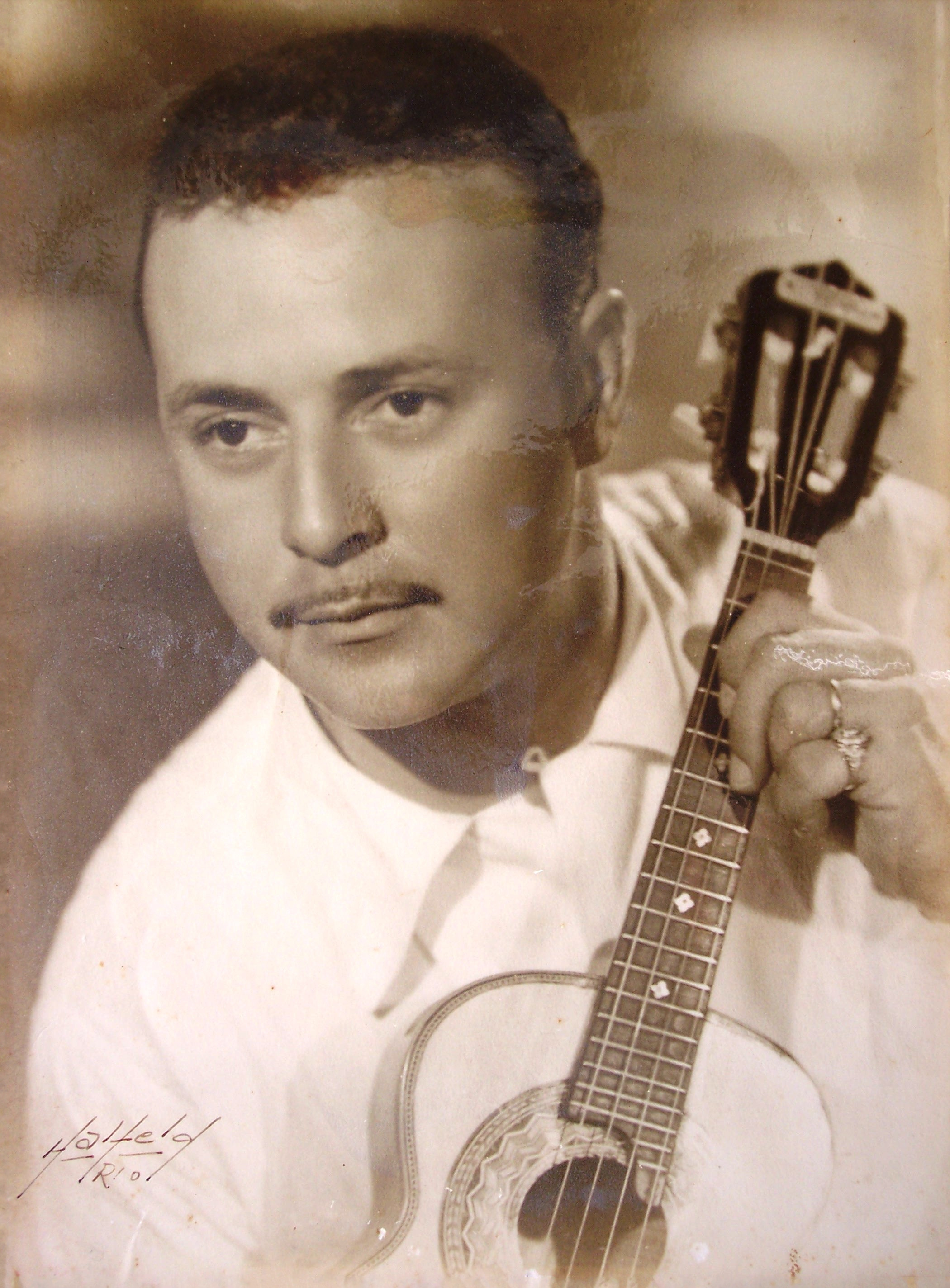
Valdir Azevedo

Valdir Azevedo or Waldir Azevedo (January 23, 1923 in Rio de Janeiro – September 21, 1980 in São Paulo) was a choro composer, conductor and performer, considered to be the most successful musician of this genre.

Azevedo was born in Rio de Janeiro, Brazil. He played flute starting from the age of seven, and later switched to mandolin and to the cavaquinho. He first performed in public in 1933 at the Carnival, playing flute.

He wrote 130 compositions during his lifetime, including the world-famous "Brasileirinho" and "Delicado". He is considered by many to be the first Brazilian cavaquinho shredder ever. One of his compositions, "Delicado," is a Latin American dance that has been arranged for piano.

He died in São Paulo, aged 57.
