= How Long =

How Long may refer to:

== Music ==
- How Long (album), a 2000 album by L.V., and the title song
- "How Long" (Ace song), 1974
- "How Long" (Charlie Puth song), 2017
- "How Long" (Hinder song), 2006
- "How Long" (Paula Toledo song), 2003
- "How Long" (Tove Lo song) a 2022 song by Tove Lo from the Euphoria soundtrack (Season 2)
- "How Long" (J. D. Souther song), notably covered by the Eagles
- "How Long" (The View song), 2012
- "How Long", a song by Labelle on the album Back to Now
- "How Long (Betcha' Got a Chick on the Side)", a 1975 song by the Pointer Sisters
- "How Long", a song by Information Society from Hack
- "How Long, How Long Blues", a 1928 classic blues song by Leroy Carr
- "How Long" (Fats Domino song), 1952
- "How Long", a 1991 song by Dire Straits from the album On Every Street
- "How Long?", a song by How to Destroy Angels from the album Welcome Oblivion
- "How Long?", a song by Vampire Weekend from Father of the Bride (2019)
- "How Long", a 2012 song by Matchbox Twenty from North
- "How Long", a song written by Lionel Richie for Kenny Rogers's 1983 album We've Got Tonight
- "How Long", a song by Ellie Goulding from her 2023 album Higher Than Heaven

== Other ==
- How Long, a play by Gibson Kente

== See also ==
- Length
