= Ranta =

Origin
- Origin: Finland
- Meaning: Shore

Ranta is a Finnish language surname of Laine type, literally meaning "coast", "shore" or "beach". People with the surname include:

- Anna Ranta, professor of neurology in New Zealand
- Aulis Ranta-Muotio (born 1946), Finnish politician
- Esko Ranta (born 1947), Finnish footballer
- Helena Ranta (born 1946), Finnish forensic dentist
- Kristian Ranta (born 1981), Finnish heavy metal guitarist
- Maarit Feldt-Ranta (1968–2019), Finnish politician
- Roope Ranta (born 1988), Finnish ice hockey player
- Sampo Ranta (born 2000), Finnish ice hockey player
- Vesa Ranta (born 1973), Finnish drummer
- Ville Ranta (born 1978), Finnish visual artist

== See also ==
- Rantanen, the corresponding Virtanen type surname
- Ranta (Hungarian: Ránta), a village in Bogata Commune, Mureș County, Romania
