= 76th Army Band (United States) =

Deactivated direct support band in Mannheim, Baden-Württemberg, Germany

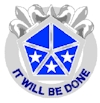

The 76th Army Band, formerly known as the V Corps Band, is a direct support band based in Mannheim, Germany. It has deployed to several locations worldwide since World War II. It deployed to Baghdad, Iraq in February 2003 and January 2006 in support of Operation Iraqi Freedom. Performing ensembles include Brass Quintet, Dixieland Band, Brass Band, Little Big Band, Concert Band, Marching Band, and Ceremonial band as well as other small ensembles.

== Lineage ==
This unit was originally formed on June 30, 1931, and was known as the 15th Coast Artillery Band stationed at Fort Kamehameha on Oahu, Hawaii. Its combat assignment was coastal defense of Pearl Harbor, but the unit also assisted in the staffing of the Hawaii Quartermaster Depot when not performing band duties. It was released from assignment to the 15th CA Regiment, and Assigned to Central Pacific Base Command on January 31, 1944.

On May 23, 1944, the 15th Coast Artillery Band was reorganized and reassigned as the 76th Army Ground Forces Band which served in the central pacific theater of operation in Japan until May 31, 1947, when the band was inactivated. The band was redesignated as the 76th Army Band on April 7, 1952 and was reactivated May 5, 1952, in Orléans, France in support of the United States Army Communications Zone Europe.

The band remained in France until 1966 when they moved to Worms, Germany. In February 1975 the band relocated to Kaiserslautern, Germany in support of 32nd Air Defense Command. On 11 October 1975, the 76th Army Band was reassigned to the 1st Support Brigade, which is now known as the 21st Theater Support Command. The band remained in Kaiserslautern until the 493rd Army Band located in Frankfurt, Germany deactivated. During the drawdown of forces in Europe, the 76th Army Band was attached to V Corps and served with great distinction as the V Corps Band. The 76th relocated again to Wiesbaden in February 1995. The band moved to Coleman Barracks in Sandhofen / Mannheim in July 2001, and was returned to 21st TSC in 2007.

The 76th Army Band has performed before millions in over 20 countries. They have been featured in many international television broadcasts and Military Music Shows around Europe.

The 76th Army Band has deployed in support of Operation Joint Endeavor and Joint Guard in the Balkans region, Operation Enduring Freedom and Operation Iraqi Freedom in 2003 and 2006, and has also supported many important commemorations of the anniversaries of D-Day, V-E Day, and The Battle of the Bulge. Other notable contributions include: over 400 troop morale concerts in Iraq; performing with Wayne Newton and Neal McCoy; opening for Bruce Willis and the Accelerators; the WWE’s Christmas in Baghdad; the Dallas Cowboy USO Tour; Robin Williams Comedy Tour; and Arnold Schwarzenegger’s USO Tour.

== Honors ==
=== Campaign participation credit ===
- World War II - AP: Central Pacific
- Iraq War

=== Decorations ===
- Army Superior Unit Award for 1991
- Joint Meritorious Unit Award for 2006
