= Spiel (Stockhausen) =

- Orchestral music by Karlheinz Stockhausen
- Catalogue: 1/4
- Composed: 1952, revised in stages
- Dedication: Doris Stockhausen
- Performed: 11 October 1952 (abridged)
- Movements: 2

Spiel (Play, or Game) is a two-movement orchestral composition by Karlheinz Stockhausen, written in 1952. Withdrawn by the composer after its first performance, it was later revised and restored to his catalogue of works, where it bears the work-number ¼. The score is dedicated to the composer's first wife, Doris.

== History ==
In November 1951, Stockhausen sketched his first orchestral work and began composing the first of its three planned movements, provisionally titled Studie für Orchester (Study for Orchestra). Shortly afterward Herbert Eimert introduced Stockhausen to the director of the Donaueschinger Musiktage, Heinrich Strobel, who asked if he would be willing to compose an orchestral work for the festival, for which Strobel was prepared to pay a sum of 1500 DM—the largest sum of money Stockhausen had ever received for any single job up to that point in his life. Stockhausen agreed to send a two-piano reduction of the movement he had already begun to Hans Rosbaud, the conductor of the Southwest German Radio Symphony Orchestra, which would give the premiere at Donaueschingen. In January 1952, Stockhausen moved to Paris to pursue post-graduate studies with Darius Milhaud and Olivier Messiaen. By the end of May, he had completed the orchestra work but had decided that the first movement (which would later be published separately under the title Formel) was too melodic and motivic. Consequently, he posted the remaining two movements, now titled Spiel, to Rosbaud in place of the single movement previously sent him.

At the end of September, Stockhausen travelled to Donaueschingen for rehearsals and the world premiere. Stockhausen himself played the piano part, and during the final rehearsals got the impression that Rosbaud would be glad if the piece could be considerably shortened. Consequently, Stockhausen suggested that the second movement could end at the midpoint, from where the structure is mirrored. Rosbaud was visibly relieved, and so the premiere, which took place on Saturday, 11 October, consisted only of the first movement and the first half of the second. The very large percussion section called for a variety of unconventional instruments, including a large drinking glass struck with a metal rod, which marks several important structural points. For this purpose, the curator of the Prince of Fürstenberg's museum allowed Stockhausen to choose a valuable and particularly beautiful-sounding goblet from the collection. During the performance, just before the point where they had decided to end, there was a big crescendo followed by a pause, at which point the goblet was to be struck and allowed to ring through the general pause. Unfortunately, Rosbaud gave too big a cue and the percussionist struck too hard, shattering the goblet into thousands of pieces. After this, there was one final, loud sound, and the audience erupted in scandal. Stockhausen decided he never wanted the piece ever to be performed again. However, in 1973 he rewrote the entire score, simplifying the percussion notation but leaving the structure intact. This revised score, with the complete second movement, was recorded for radio broadcast in July 1973 by the Südwestfunk Orchester Baden-Baden under the composer's direction, and on 14 September 1975 it was publicly performed for the first time by Stockhausen conducting the Berlin Philharmonic.

== Instrumentation ==
The orchestra consists of 3 oboes, 3 clarinets, 3 bassoons, contrabassoon, 3 horns, seven percussionists, glockenspiel, vibraphone, celesta, electric organ, piano, and strings.

== Analysis ==
The two movements, played without pause, are headed:

1. Paris 11.III.52
2. Paris 4.V.52

The fundamental underlying conception of the work is that of punctualism, a radical renunciation of both melodic and harmonic connections between tones which allows structures of "tone points" to arise that function throughout the entire pitch range.

The first movement opens with rhythmically complex superimposed layers of two-note groups with intervals of different sizes, ranging from a minor second to a minor seventh. The movement consists of seven large, register-defined sections, in which a leading role is taken by the vibraphone, which stands alone in the fourth, central section, with notes compressed into the middle register. The overall design is formed out of a gradual accretion of atomised points into melodic chains. It is "a music of high contrasts between the brilliant flashes of percussion and the muted glow of the sustaining instruments: a nocturne with exploding shells".

The second movement operates in four layers, with pitched and unpitched instruments in pairs. The four layers are characterised by delicately nuanced rhythmic values whose differences are particularly noticeable at the beginning of the movement. The overall plan may be regarded as a polyphonised elaboration of the conception of Kreuzspiel, in which the layers at the beginning are each restricted to a single octave, beginning with soft, sustained sounds in both pitched and unpitched percussion in the extreme high and low registers, and the notes are then led in a gradually broadening registral process. This registral evolution sets into play a polyphonic system based on a series consisting of twelve pitches, twelve durations, and six dynamics.

== Discography ==
- Karlheinz Stockhausen. Drei Lieder, für Altstimme und Kammerorchester (1950); Sonatine, für Violine und Klavier (1951); Spiel, für Orchester (1952); Schlagtrio, für Klavier und 2 x 3 Pauken (1952). Sylvia Anderson, alto; Sinfonie-Orchester des Südwestfunks Baden-Baden, Karlheinz Stockhausen, cond. Saschko Gawriloff, violin; Aloys Kontarsky, piano. LP Recording, 1 disc: stereo, 12 in., 33⅓ rpm. DGG 2530 827. [Hamburg]: Deutsche Grammophon, 1977. This recording of Spiel reissued on CD together with Stockhausen's Formel, Schlagtrio, and Punkte, 1 sound disc: digital, 4¾ in. Stockhausen Complete Edition CD2. Kürten: Stockhausen-Verlag, 1991.
