= It's in the Book =

Single by Johnny Standley
- Released: September 1952
- Recorded: 1952
- Genre: Pop
- Length: 6:04
- Label: Capitol
- Songwriters: Johnny Standley, Art Thorsen

"It's in the Book" is a recorded comic monologue by Johnny Standley. It was marketed as a pop song and made the Billboard chart in 1952, reaching number one. It sold over one million copies, and was awarded a gold disc.

In 1952, Standley wrote (with Art Thorsen) a song/comedy routine called "It's in the Book". In it, Standley plays a revivalist preacher who gives a take on the children's tale Little Bo Peep, claiming his interpretation is in the Bible: "It's in the book!" The number (featuring Heidt's orchestra) continues in that vein, with Standley praising "Grandma's Lye Soap", while the audience cheers. "It's in the Book" was released by the small Magnolia label as a single in the fall of 1952, then picked up by Capitol Records. The routine (which, at over six minutes long, had to be split over both sides of the record) shocked industry observers as it hit the Billboard charts in October and raced all the way to the number-one spot for the week ending November 22, 1952. Aided by radio airplay and TV appearances, the record sold over two million copies, making it perhaps the mostly unlikely recording ever to receive a gold record (as well as the oddest tune ever to hit number one in the US).

Also in 1952, Dickie Goodman (under the name "Dick Good") recorded his own version of "It's in the Book" on Chess Records. Goodman's version quickly faded into obscurity, but four years later, he (and partner Bill Buchanan) would create The Flying Saucer, the first of several hit break-in records for Goodman.

The recording can be heard in the background in the final scene of the 1971 film, The Last Picture Show.

== See also ==
- List of Billboard number-one singles of 1952
