= Here Stands Fats Domino =

Studio album by Fats Domino
- Released: March 1957
- Recorded: December 1949 and January 1950
- Genre: Rock n roll, piano blues
- Label: Imperial
- Producer: Dave Bartholomew

Fats Domino chronology
This Is Fats Domino! (1956)	Here Stands Fats Domino (1957)	This Is Fats (1957)

Here Stands Fats Domino is the fourth studio album by American rock and roll pianist Fats Domino, released on Imperial Records.

== Reception ==
Professional ratings
Review scores
Source	Rating
AllMusic	3/5 stars
(The New) Rolling Stone Album Guide	4.5/5 stars

AllMusic reviewer Bruce Eder noted the diversity of Domino's styles, from "surprisingly elegant ballad" to "pounding rocker" and "slow blues... [with] some supremely subtle sax work".

== Track listing ==
All songs written by Dave Bartholomew and Fats Domino, except where noted.

Side one:

1. "Detroit City Blues" – 2:25
2. "Hide Away Blues" – 2:22
3. "She’s My Baby" – 2:38
4. "Brand New Baby" (Bartholomew) – 2:34
5. "Little Bee" (Bartholomew) – 2:24
6. "Every Night About This Time" – 2:03

Side two:

1. "I’m Walkin’" – 2:01
2. "I’m in the Mood for Love" (Dorothy Fields and Jimmy McHugh) – 2:40
3. "Cheatin’" (Domino) – 2:33
4. "You Can Pack Your Suitcase" – 2:18
5. "Hey! Fat Man" (Domino) – 2:32
6. "I’ll Be Gone" (Domino and Al Young) – 2:18
