= Paul Breisach =

Austrian conductor (1896–1952)

- Born: June 3, 1896; Vienna
- Died: December 26, 1952 (aged 56); New York City
- Occupation: Conductor of operas

Paul Breisach (June 3, 1896 – December 26, 1952) was an Austrian-born conductor.

Breisach was born in Vienna and studied piano as a child. He was a pupil of Heinrich Schenker in Vienna for several years, beginning in October 1913. He accompanied singers including Lotte Lehmann and Elisabeth Schumann, and worked with Richard Strauss at the Vienna State Opera. He was a conductor at the Deutsche Oper Berlin during Carl Ebert's term as director. Rudolf Bing was his first cousin.

Breisach conducted at the Metropolitan Opera from 1941 through 1946, including productions of Aïda, La bohème, The Magic Flute, and Fidelio. He was a staff conductor at the San Francisco Opera during the 1940s until his death in 1952. He was credited as musical director on two opera productions on Broadway, La Vie Parisienne in 1942 and The Rape of Lucretia (1947). "Under his guidance the orchestra was always disciplined and its tone was good," noted The New York Times reviewer of Breisach's work in 1942.

Breisach was married and had a son. He became a United States citizen in 1945. He died in 1952, at the age of 56, in New York City, soon after conducting the Buenos Aires Philharmonic during a tour of South America.
