= Schlagtrio =

Ensemble by Karlheinz Stockhausen

Schlagtrio (Percussive Trio) is a chamber-music work for piano and two timpanists (each playing three timpani) composed by Karlheinz Stockhausen in 1952. It is Nr. ⅓ in his catalogue of works.

== History ==
The Schlagtrio was originally written in Paris in 1952 as a Schlagquartett (Percussive Quartet), for piano and three timpanists, each playing a pair of drums. It was premiered that year in Hamburg, but only in a radio recording. The first public performance was given in Munich on 23 March 1953, in Karl Amadeus Hartmann's musica viva concert series, after which Stockhausen decided that he had made impractical demands for subtle attack differentiations in both the percussion and piano parts. He withdrew the score after those two performances until 1973, when he decided to renotate it. This revision was carried out during a holiday break in 1974, at N'Gor, a beach resort near Dakar in Senegal. The attacks and pitches remained unaltered, but the six timpani were redistributed, three each for just two players, and the note values were doubled in order to facilitate reading.

== Analysis ==
The six timpani are tuned to a whole-tone scale, a quarter tone lower than the piano. Each drum corresponds to one octave in the piano. This oppositional scoring differentiates the piece from its immediate predecessors, Kreuzspiel, Spiel, and Formel. The former two use percussion as a noise element in contrast to pitch, while Formel integrates percussion timbres into the pitch structures of the other instruments. The course of the work describes a process in which the clear sounds of the piano and the more shadowy notes of the timpani gradually come together, make contact and overlap, and then withdraw once again. This is accomplished in a succession of twenty-three phases. The central, twelfth phase is the only one in which all twelve pitches in the piano and all six stroke types in the timpani are present.

== Discography ==
- Stockhausen: Drei Lieder, Sonatina, Spiel, Schlagtrio. Sylvia Anderson (alto), Südwestfunk Sinfonie-Orchester, Karlheinz Stockhausen (cond.); Saschko Gawriloff (violin), Aloys Kontarsky (piano), Jean Batigne, Georges van Gucht (timpani). LP recording. DG 2530 827. Hamburg: Deutsche Grammophon, 1977. Spiel and Schlagtrio reissued, together with Punkte and Formel, on Stockhausen Complete Edition CD 2. Kürten: Stockhausen-Verlag, 1991.
- Stockhausen: Kontra-Punkte, Refrain, Zeitmaße, Schlagtrio. ensemble recherche, Rupert Huber (cond.). Wergo WER 6717 2. Mainz: Wergo, 2009. Disc reissued as part of Music Of Our Time: 50 Years: 1962–2012. 5-CD set. Wergo 6946. Wergo, 2012.
- Stockhausen: Complete Early Percussion Works. Steven Schick, percussion; James Avery, piano; Red Fish, Blue Fish (Ross Karre, Justin DeHart, Matthew Jenkins, Fabio Oliveira, Jonathan Hepfer, Gregory Stuart). CD recording, digital: 2 sound discs, stereo. Mode 274–275. New York: Mode Records, 2014.

== Filmography ==
- Brandt, Brian, and Michael Hynes (prod.). 2014. Stockhausen: Complete Early Percussion Works. Steven Schick, James Avery, Red Fish Blue Fish. DVD recording, region 0, NTSC, Dolby 5.1 surround/DTS 5.1 surround, aspect ratio 16:9, color. Mode 274. New York: Mode Records.
