= Let's Play Fats Domino =

Studio album by Fats Domino
- Released: September 1959
- Genre: Rock n roll
- Label: Imperial
- Producer: Dave Bartholomew

Fats Domino chronology
The Fabulous Mr. D (1957)	Let's Play Fats Domino (1959)	Fats Domino Sings Million Record Hits (1960)

Let’s Play Fats Domino is the seventh studio album by American rock and roll pianist Fats Domino, released on Imperial Records.

== Reception ==
A contemporary review in Billboard highlighted how many hits the album had and its strong New Orleans sound. The New Rolling Stone Album Guide scores this release alongside all of Domino's Imperial albums as 4.5 out of five stars. The editorial staff of AllMusic Guide scored this album 3.5 out of five stars, with reviewer Stephen Thomas Erlewine characterizing it as a "terrifically entertaining listen" and summing up his review "maybe it's not the best Fats Domino album ever, but as it's playing it's hard to imagine listening to anything better than this".

== Track listing ==
All songs written by Dave Bartholomew and Fats Domino, except where noted.

Side one:

1. "You Left Me" – 2:02
2. "Ain't It Good" – 2:38
3. "Howdy Podner" – 2:09
4. "Stack & Billy" – 2:00
5. "Would You" (Victor A. Augustine, Domino, and Pearl King) – 1:58
6. "Margie" (Con Conrad and J. Russel Robinson) – 2:15

Side one Vinyl Lovers re-release bonus track:

7. "You Done Me Wrong" (Domino) – 2:10

Side two:

7. "Hands Across the Table" (Jean Delettre and Mitchell Parish) – 1:57
8. "When the Saints Go Marching In" (traditional, arrangement by Bartholomew and Domino) – 2:23
9. "Ida Jane" (Domino) – 2:14
10. "Lil' Liza Jane" (Countess Ada de Lachau, with new lyrics by Bartholomew and Domino) – 1:51
11. "I'm Gonna Be a Wheel Some Day" (Bartholomew, Domino, and Roy Hayes) – 2:02
12. "I Want to Walk You Home" (Domino) – 2:15

Side two Vinyl Lovers re-release bonus track:

14. "So Long" – 2:10

== Personnel ==
Adapted from the liner notes from the Vinyl Lovers re-release:

- Fats Domino – vocals and piano, except on "I'm Gonna Be a Wheel Some Day" (vocals only)

"You Left Me" (recorded in New Orleans, Louisiana, between June and December 1953)

- Cornelius Coleman – drums
- Billy Diamond – bass guitar
- Wendell Duconge – alto saxophone
- Robert “Buddy” Hagans – tenor saxophone
- Walter "Papoose" Nelson – guitar

"Ain't It Good" (recorded in New Orleans, Louisiana, between June and December 1953)

- Lee Allen – tenor saxophone
- Cornelius Coleman – drums
- Billy Diamond – bass guitar
- Wendell Duconge – alto saxophone
- Walter "Papoose" Nelson – guitar

"Howdy Podner" (recorded at Cosimo Recording Studio, New Orleans, Louisiana, between October and November 1955)

- Lee Allen or Herb Hardesty or Buddy Hagans – tenor saxophone
- Cornelius Coleman – drums
- Frank Fields – bass guitar
- Clarence Ford – alto saxophone
- Ernest McLean – guitar

"Stack & Billy" (recorded at Cosimo Recording Studio, New Orleans, Louisiana, 1957)

- Lee Allen or Clarence Ford or Herb Hardesty – tenor saxophone
- Cornelius Coleman – drums
- Frank Fields – bass guitar
- Ernest McLean – guitar

"Would You" (recorded at Cosimo Recording Studio, New Orleans, Louisiana, 1957)

- Lee Allen or Herb Hardesty – tenor saxophone
- Frank Fields – bass guitar
- Walter "Papoose" Nelson – guitar
- Earl Palmer – drums

"Margie" (recorded at Cosimo Recording Studio, New Orleans, Louisiana, September 1958)

- Red Callender or Jimmie Davis – bass guitar
- Cornelius Coleman – drums
- Wendell Duconge – alto saxophone
- Clarence Ford – baritone saxophone
- Herb Hardesty – tenor saxophone
- Plas Johnson – tenor saxophone
- Walter "Papoose" Nelson – guitar

"You Done Me Wrong" (recorded in New Orleans, Louisiana, between June and December 1953)

- Lee Allen – tenor saxophone
- Cornelius Coleman – drums
- Frank Fields – bass guitar
- Robert “Buddy” Hagans – tenor saxophone
- Walter "Papoose" Nelson – guitar

"Hands Across the Table" (recorded in Los Angeles, California, October 1958)

- Red Callender or Jimmie Davis – bass guitar
- Cornelius Coleman – drums
- Herb Hardesty – tenor saxophone
- Plas Johnson – baritone saxophone
- Walter "Papoose" Nelson – guitar

"When the Saints Go Marching In" (recorded at Cosimo Recording Studio, New Orleans, Louisiana, between June and November 1958)

- Cornelius Coleman or Earl Palmer – drums
- Jimmie Davis – bass guitar
- Wendell Duconge – alto saxophone
- Clarence Ford – tenor saxophone
- Herb Hardesty – tenor saxophone
- Plas Johnson – baritone saxophone
- Ernest McLean – guitar
- Allen Toussaint – piano

"Lil' Liza Jane" (recorded at Cosimo Recording Studio, New Orleans, Louisiana, between June and November 1958)

- Cornelius Coleman or Earl Palmer – drums
- Jimmie Davis – bass guitar
- Wendell Duconge – alto saxophone
- Clarence Ford – tenor saxophone
- Herb Hardesty – tenor saxophone
- Plas Johnson – baritone saxophone
- Ernest McLean – guitar

"I'm Gonna Be a Wheel Some Day" (recorded at Cosimo Recording Studio, New Orleans, Louisiana, between June and November 1958)

- Cornelius Coleman or Earl Palmer – drums
- Jimmie Davis – bass guitar
- Wendell Duconge – alto saxophone
- Clarence Ford – tenor saxophone
- Herb Hardesty – tenor saxophone
- Plas Johnson – baritone saxophone
- Ernest McLean – guitar

"Ida Jane" (recorded at Cosimo Recording Studio, New Orleans, Louisiana, May 25, 1956)

- Justin Adams – guitar
- Lee Allen – tenor saxophone
- Dave Bartholomew – trumpet
- Herb Hardesty – tenor saxophone
- Frank Fields – bass guitar
- Ernest McLean – guitar
- Charles Williams – drums

"I Want to Talk You Home" (recorded at Cosimo Recording Studio, New Orleans, Louisiana, June 18, 1958)

- Cornelius Coleman – drums
- Jimmie Davis – bass guitar
- Clarence Ford – saxophone
- Buddy Hagans – saxophone
- Roy Montrell or Walter "Papoose" Nelson – guitar

"So Long" (recorded at Cosimo Recording Studio, New Orleans, Louisiana, between October and November 1955)

- Lee Allen or Herb Hardesty or Buddy Hagans – tenor saxophone
- Cornelius Coleman – drums
- Frank Fields – bass guitar
- Clarence Ford – alto saxophone
- Ernest McLean – guitar
