= Marko Rantanen =

Finnish ice hockey goaltender

- Born: February 28, 1975 (age 50) Espoo, Finland
- Height: 5 ft 9 in (175 cm)
- Weight: 172 lb (78 kg; 12 st 4 lb)
- Position: Goalie
- Caught: Left
- Played for: Jokerit; KalPa; LHC Les Lions; Newcastle Riverkings; Vålerenga Ishockey
- Playing career: 1995–2002

Marko Rantanen (born February 28, 1975) is a Finnish former ice hockey goaltender.

Rantanen played in the SM-liiga for Jokerit and KalPa, playing seventeen games for each team. He also played in the French Élite Ligue for LHC Les Lions, the British Ice Hockey Superleague for the Newcastle Riverkings and the Norwegian Eliteserien for Vålerenga Ishockey.

Rantanen represented his country in junior level, including the 1993 IIHF European U18 Championship.
