= Le Merle noir =

Short chamber piece by Olivier Messiaen

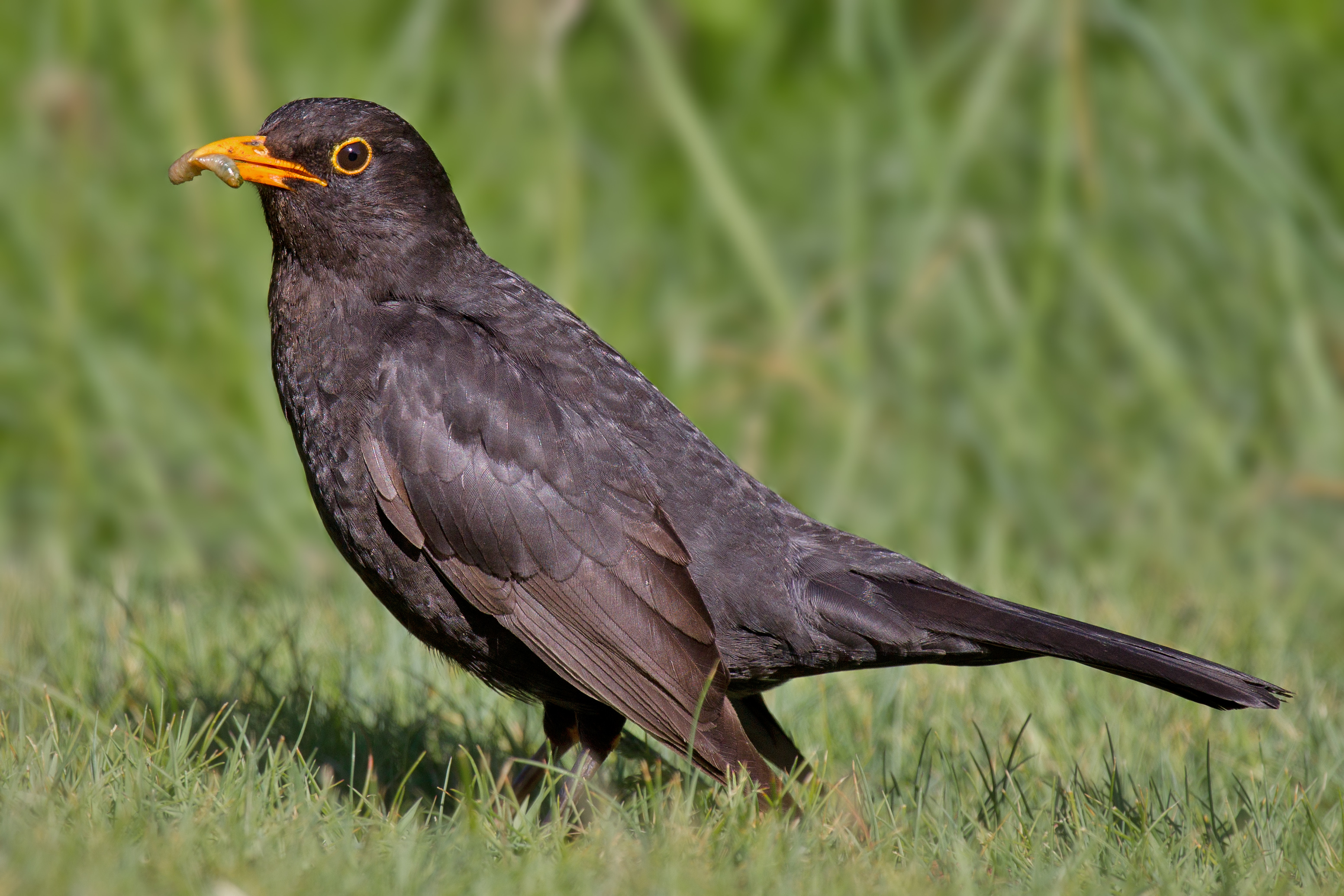
A male blackbird, Turdus merula; the males are known for their song

Le Merle noir ("The Blackbird") is a chamber miniature by the French composer Olivier Messiaen for flute and piano. Written and premièred in 1952, it is one of the composer's shortest independently published works, lasting just over five minutes. It bears neither time nor key signature.

== History ==
The composition originated in a 1952 commission for an examination piece for flute by the Conservatoire de Paris, where Messiaen served as professor of harmony and musical analysis. For that year, the first-prize winners in the Concours de flûte were Daniel Morlier, Jean-Pierre Eustache, Jean Ornetti, Régis Calle, and the British Alexander Murray.

Messiaen had a consuming, lifelong interest in ornithology, particularly birdsong. While not his first work to incorporate stylised birdsong (this was L'Ascension), Le merle noir was the earliest of his pieces to use authentically transcribed birdsong - in this case, a common blackbird's - foreshadowing Messiaen's later, more extended birdsong-inspired pieces.

Later that year, the score and its flute-part were published by Éditions Alphonse Leduc, engraved by Gautier. Messiaen's fair copy lies amongst the collections of the Morgan Library and Museum in New York City, having been auctioned on 17 June 2016 by Alde; his sketches are now possessed by the Bibliothèque nationale de France.
