= The Fabulous Mr. D =

Studio album by Fats Domino
- Released: August 1958
- Genre: Rock n roll
- Label: Imperial
- Producer: Dave Bartholomew

Fats Domino chronology
This Is Fats (1957)	The Fabulous Mr. D (1958)	Let's Play Fats Domino (1959)

The Fabulous Mr. D is the sixth studio album by American rock and roll pianist Fats Domino, released on Imperial Records.

== Reception ==
In Boys' Life, Bob Hood recommended this album for Domino being "the most unbeatable character". The New Rolling Stone Album Guide scores this release alongside all of Domino's Imperial albums as 4.5 out of five stars.

== Track listing ==
All songs written by Dave Bartholomew and Fats Domino, except where noted.

Side one:

1. "The Big Beat" – 2:00
2. "I'll Be Glad When You're Dead You Rascal You" (Sam Theard) – 2:35
3. "What Will I Tell My Heart" (Jack Lawrence and Peter Tinturin) – 2:35
4. "Barrel House" – 2:32
5. "Little Mary" – 1:59
6. "Sick and Tired" (Bartholomew, Domino, and Chris Kenner) – 2:32

Side two:

1. "I Want You to Know" – 1:59
2. "'44'" – 2:30
3. "Mardi Gras in New Orleans (Henry Roeland Byrd) – 2:15
4. "I Can't Go On" – 2:05
5. "Long Lonesome Journey" (Domino and Theodore R. Jarrett) – 2:24
6. "Young School Girl" – 1:55
