= This Is Fats =

Studio album by Fats Domino
- Released: August 8, 1957
- Genre: Rock and roll
- Label: Imperial
- Producer: Dave Bartholomew

Fats Domino chronology
Here Stands Fats Domino (1957)	This Is Fats (1957)	The Fabulous Mr. D (1958)

This Is Fats is the fifth studio album by American rock and roll pianist Fats Domino, released on Imperial Records.

== Reception ==
The New Rolling Stone Album Guide scores this release alongside all of Domino's Imperial albums as 4.5 out of five stars.

== Track listing ==
All songs written by Dave Bartholomew and Fats Domino, except where noted.

Side one:

1. "The Rooster Song" – 2:05
2. "My Happiness" (Borney Bergantine and Betty Peterson) – 2:14
3. "As Time Goes By" (Herman Hupfeld) – 1:38
4. "Hey La Bas" (Bartholomew) – 2:24
5. "Love Me" – 1:55
6. "Don’t You Hear Me Calling You" – 2:06

Side two:

1. "It’s You I Love" – 2:01
2. "Valley of Tears" – 1:52
3. "Where Did You Stay" – 2:00
4. "Baby Please" – 1:55
5. "Thinking of You" (R. Hall) – 2:09
6. "You Know I Miss You" (Domino and Al Young) – 2:12
