= Delicado (song) =

Song
- Published: 1952
- Composer: Waldir Azevedo
- Lyricist: Jack Lawrence

"Delicado" (Portuguese pronunciation: [deliˈkadu]; "Delicate") is a popular song published in 1952 with music by Waldir Azevedo and lyrics by Jack Lawrence. The song reached the top of the Billboard charts in 1952.

== Notable versions ==
- Oscar Alemán (1909-1980) recorded a version for guitar, released in Argentina in October of 1951.
- A version recorded by Percy Faith and his orchestra reached number one on the Billboard chart in 1952.
- Dinah Shore with Henri Rene's Orchestra and Chorus recorded a successful cover version in 1952.
- The Three Suns, 1952.
- Stan Kenton recorded a cover for his 1955 album, Popular Favorites by Stan Kenton.
- A version was recorded by the British bandleader and conductor Stanley Black in 1957.
- Accordionist Dick Contino with David Carroll Orchestra on their 1962 album South American Holiday.
- Dr. John (Malcolm John "Mac" Rebennack Jr.) recorded a New Orleans-style version on Dr. John Plays Mac Rebennack Vol. 1 (1981).
- Tito Cortés recorded a version which included lyrics.
- Waldir Azevedo
- Carmen Miranda sang with lyrics on the Jimmy Durante Show in 1955, her last performance.

== See also ==
- List of Billboard number-one singles of 1952
