= Poor Poor Me =

Single by Fats Domino

from the album This Is Fats Domino!
- B-side: "Trust in Me"
- Released: 1952
- Genre: Rock and roll
- Length: 2:06
- Label: Imperial
- Songwriter(s): Fats Domino

Fats Domino singles chronology
"Goin' Home" (1952)	"Poor Poor Me" (1952)	"How Long" (1952)

"Poor Poor Me" is a song written and performed by Fats Domino. In 1952, it reached No. 10 on the U.S. R&B chart.

The song is included on his 1956 album, This Is Fats Domino!
