= Piano Concerto No. 4 (Villa-Lobos) =

Composition for piano and orchestra by Heitor Villa-Lobos

- Concerto by Heitor Villa-Lobos
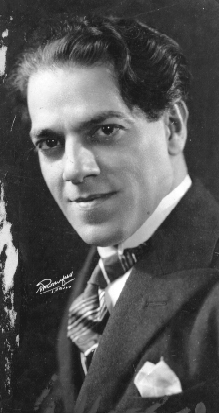
- Heitor Villa-Lobos
- Catalogue: W505
- Composed: 1952: Rio de Janeiro, Paris, New York
- Dedication: Bernardo Segall
- Published: 1979: Paris (reduction for two pianos)
- Publisher: Max Eschig
- Recorded: 1970 Gilberto Tinetti, piano; Orchestre national de France (ORTF), conducted by Jean Fournet. (issued 2013 on CD, Homenagem a Gilberto Tinetti II, LAMI 014).
- Duration: 27 min
- Movements: Four
- Scoring: piano; orchestra

Premiere
- Date: 9 January 1953
- Location: Syria Mosque, Pittsburgh
- Conductor: Heitor Villa-Lobos
- Performers: Bernardo Segall, piano; Pittsburgh Symphony Orchestra

The Piano Concerto No. 4, W505, is a composition for piano and orchestra by the Brazilian composer Heitor Villa-Lobos, written in 1952. A typical performance lasts about 27 minutes.

Villa-Lobos composed his Fourth Piano Concerto in 1952, beginning in Rio de Janeiro, continuing work in Paris, where he finished the second movement, and then in New York where he completed the work. It was commissioned for the pianist Bernardo Segall, to whom the score is dedicated. Segall gave the first performance in Pittsburgh on 9 January 1953 with the Pittsburgh Symphony Orchestra, conducted by the composer.

== Instrumentation ==
The work is scored for solo piano and an orchestra consisting of piccolo, 2 flutes, 2 oboes, cor anglais, 2 clarinets, bass clarinet, 2 bassoons, contrabassoon, 4 horns, 2 trumpets, 2 trombones, tuba, percussion (timpani, tam-tam, cymbals, coco, bell, bass drum), and strings.

== Analysis ==
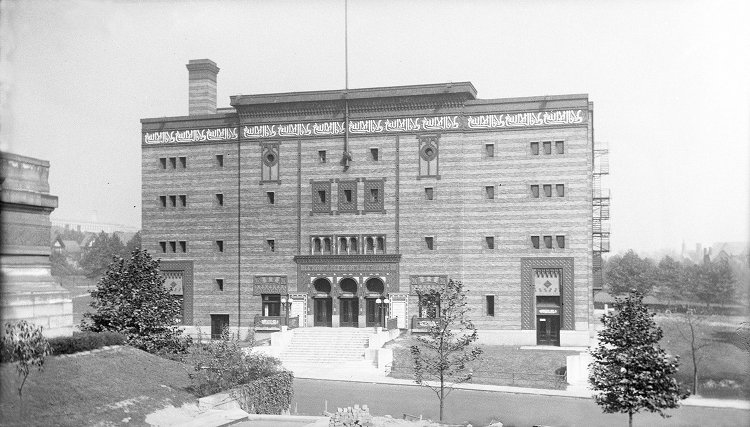
Syria Mosque, Pittsburgh (venue of the concerto's premiere)

The concerto has four movements:

1. Allegro non troppo
2. Andante con moto
3. Scherzo (Allegro vivace) – Cadenza
4. Allegro moderato

The first movement is not in any traditional form but instead consists of eight successive sections built around two themes, both of which are exposed in the first section. The first theme is predominantly contrapuntal in texture and features quartal harmonies, while the second theme is homophonic and uses tertian harmonies.

The second movement, like the first, is a chain form, in this case made up of six sections employing a main theme and two secondary themes. Recurring structures built on the main theme cause it often to resemble a chaconne.

The third movement is a scherzo but, instead of the conventional ABA form, has two central sections (in an ABCA´ pattern), deploying two main themes and six shorter melodic ideas interspersed with material recalled from the previous two movements. A fifth, concluding section is an extended cadenza summarizing the thematic material of the three movements presented up to this point.

The finale, like the other movements, is in chain form but consists of just three large sections. Its main theme, stated at the outset, recalls the second theme from the scherzo. This gives way to a new theme, and then to a third theme based on the first movement's principal theme. The second section expands on the main theme, while the third section dwells on the second and third themes. The movement is brought to a close with a return of the opening material from the first movement.

== Discography ==
- Heitor Villa-Lobos: Concerto para Piano e Orquestra n. 4. Gilberto Tinetti, piano; Orchestre national de France (ORTF), conducted by Jean Fournet. Live recording from 1970. In Homenagem a Gilberto Tinetti II. CD recording, 1 disc: LAMI 014. São Paulo: LAMI-ECA/USP, 2013.
- Heitor Villa-Lobos: 5 concertos para piano e orquestra. Fernando Lopes, piano; Orquestra Sinfônica Municipal de Campinas; conducted by Benito Juarez. Recorded 18–24 June 1984, in the Teatro Interno do Centro de Covivência Cultural da Campinas. LP recording, 4 discs: 12 inch, 33⅓ rpm, stereo. Energia de São Paulo: LPVL 01/25 – LPVL 04/25. São Paulo: Energia de São Paulo, [1984?].
- Heitor Villa-Lobos: Five Piano Concertos. Cristina Ortiz, piano; Royal Philharmonic Orchestra, conducted by Miguel Ángel Gómez Martínez. Recorded at the Walthamstow Assembly Hall in October 1989, January and July 1990. 2-CD set: stereo. London 430 628-2 (430 629-2 and 430 630–2). London: The Decca Record Company Limited, 1992.
- Heitor Villa-Lobos: Cinco Conciertos para Piano y Orquesta. Elvira Santiago, piano (Concerto No. 1); Ulises Hernández, piano (Concerto No. 2); Patricio Malcolm, piano (Concerto No. 3); Harold López-Nussa, piano (Concerto No. 4); Roberto Urbay, piano (Concerto No. 5); Orquesta Sinfónica Nacional de Cuba, conducted by Enrique Pérez Mesa. Concerto No. 4 recorded at the Teatro Auditorium Amadeo Roldán, Havana, Cuba, 14 December 2003, as part of the XXV Festival Internacional del Nuevo Cine Latinoamericano. 2 CDs + 1 DVD. Colibrí DVD/CD 050. Havana: Colibrí, 2006.
