= Johnny Standley =

American musician, actor, and comedian (1912–1992)

Johnny Standley (December 6, 1912 – May 27, 1992) was an American musician, actor, and comedian.

== Early life and career ==
Born in Oklahoma City, Standley moved to Milwaukee at a young age, touring the Midwest and Southwest for many years as an actor and comedian with his parents' tent show called "The Standley Players". During World War II, he served in the US Army and entertained the troops with Red Skelton and Dave Brubeck for the USO. Standley frequently worked with Horace Heidt, touring with the bandleader and occasionally appearing on his television program.

=== "It's in the Book" ===
In 1952, Standley wrote (with Art Thorsen) a song/comedy routine called "It's in the Book". In it, Standley plays a revivalist preacher who gives a (possibly inebriated) take on the children's tale Little Bo Peep, claiming his interpretation is in the Bible: "It's in the book!" The number (featuring Heidt's orchestra) continues in that vein, with Standley praising "Grandma's Lye Soap", while the audience cheers. "It's in the Book" was released by the small Magnolia label as a single in the fall of 1952, then picked up by Capitol Records. The routine (which, at over six minutes long, had to be split over both sides of the record) shocked industry observers as it hit the Billboard charts in October and raced all the way to the number-one spot for the week ending November 22, 1952. Aided by radio airplay and TV appearances, the record sold over two million copies, making it perhaps the mostly unlikely recording ever to receive a gold record.

Standley continued touring with Heidt's stage show, but would release only two more records, neither of them hits: "Proud New Father" b/w "Clap Your Hands" (Capitol 2569) in 1953, and "Get Out and Vote" (with Jimmy Sheldon's Orchestra; Capitol 3544) in 1956. (The latter was later re-released by the California Republican Party, of which Horace Heidt Jr. was a member.)

"It's in the Book" would attract further attention in 1971, when filmmaker Peter Bogdanovich used it in his movie The Last Picture Show, playing in the background in the film's final scene.

In 1992, Standley died of pneumonia at the age of 79, in Los Angeles.
