= Matti Rantanen (accordionist) =

Finnish accordionist

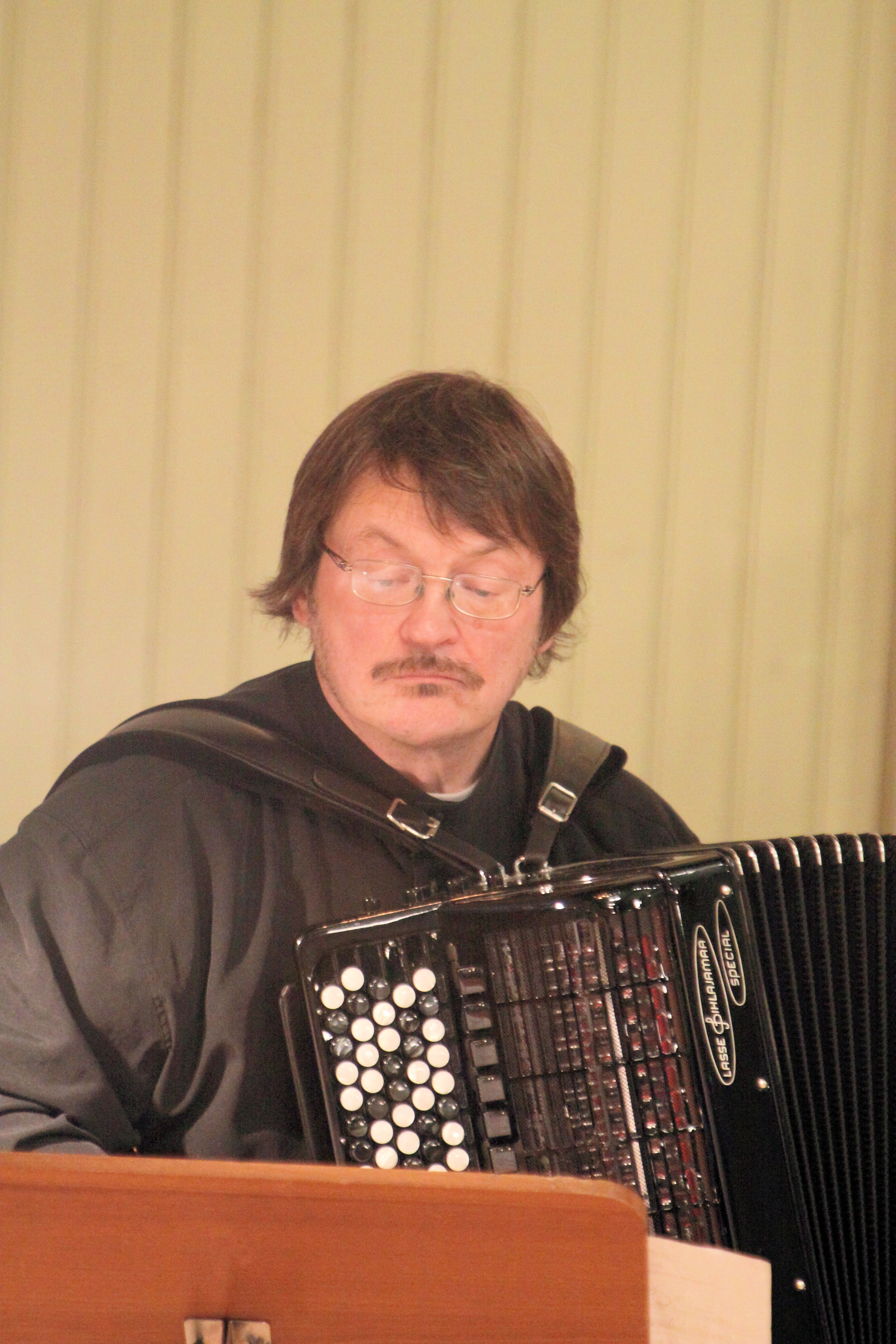
Matti Rantanen

Matti Juhani Rantanen (born February 20, 1952) is a Finnish accordionist.

Rantanen won the Finnish Youth Accordion Championship four successive times from 1964 to 1967, national championship in 1968, the Scandinavian championship in 1969 and 1970, and was third in the world championship in 1970.
