= How Long (Fats Domino song) =

Single by Fats Domino
- B-side: "Dreaming"
- Released: October 1952
- Genre: Rhythm and blues
- Length: 2:00
- Label: Imperial
- Songwriter(s): Fats Domino, Alvin E. Young

Fats Domino singles chronology
"Poor Poor Me" (1952)	"How Long" (1952)	"Nobody Loves Me" (1953)

"How Long" is a song written by Fats Domino and Alvin E. Young and performed by Fats Domino. In 1952, it reached No. 9 on the U.S. R&B chart.
