= Billboard year-end top 30 singles of 1952 =

Ranking of recorded music

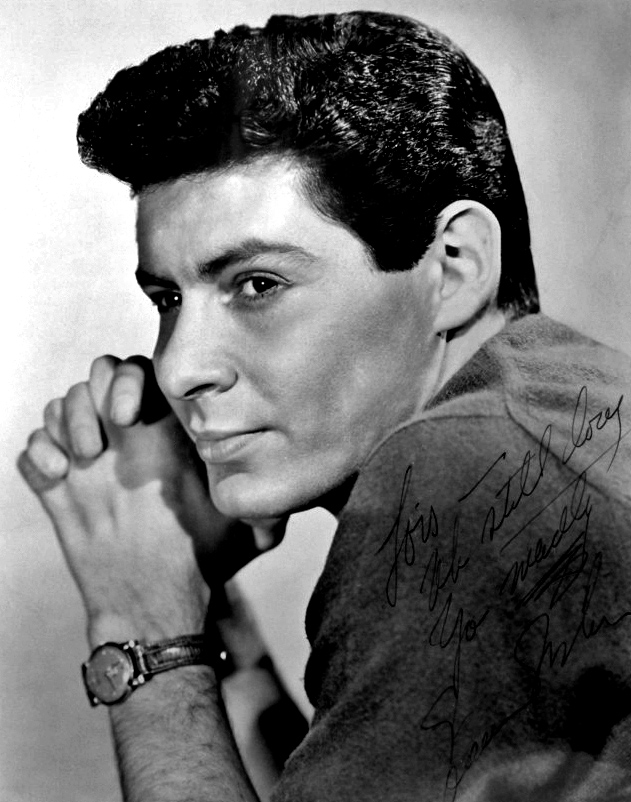
Eddie Fisher (pictured) with Hugo Winterhalter had four songs, including No. 7, on the year-end top 30.

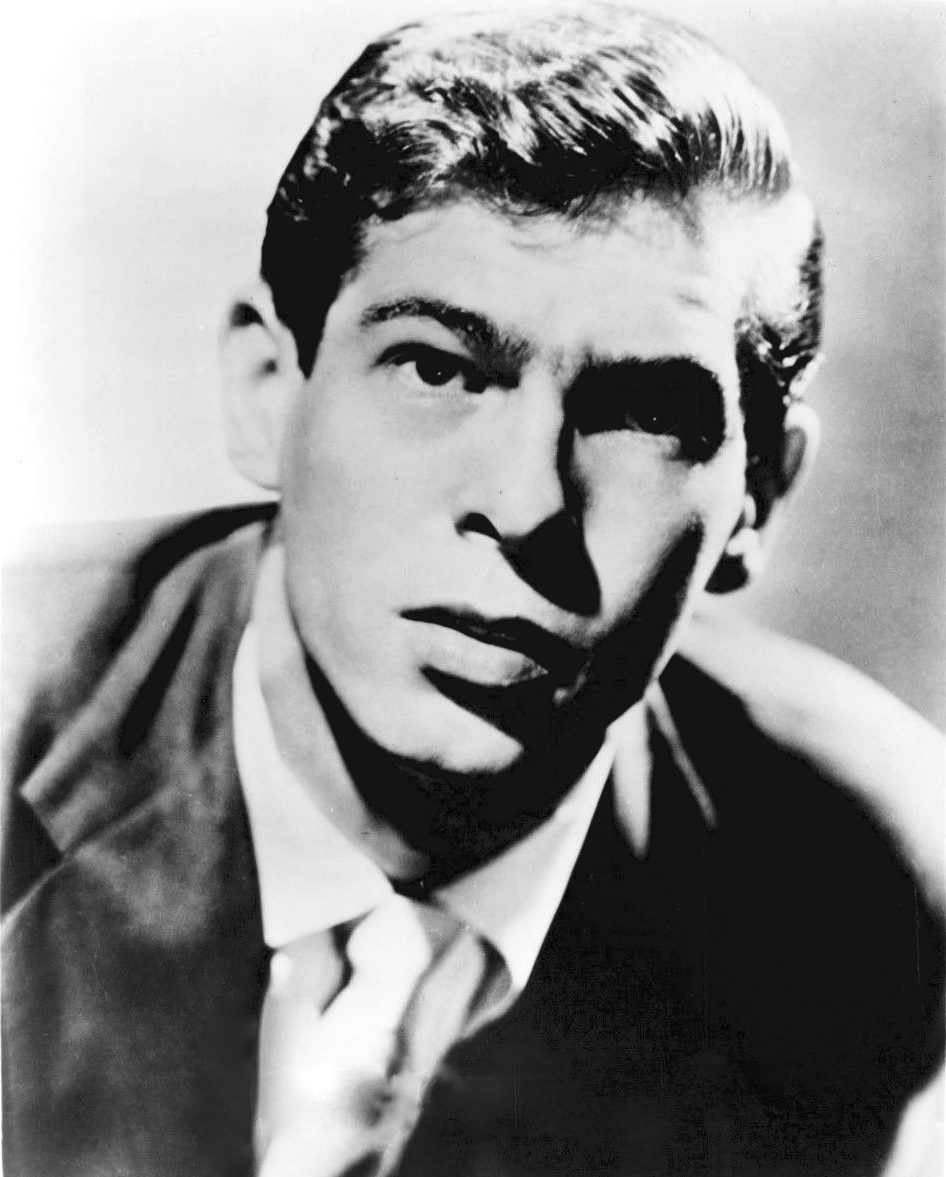
Johnnie Ray, with The Four Lads (three) and Buddy Cole (one), had four songs, including No. 3, on the year-end top 30.

This is a list of Billboard magazine's top popular songs of 1952 by retail sales.

No.	Title	Artist(s)
1	"Blue Tango"	Leroy Anderson
2	"Wheel of Fortune"	Kay Starr
3	"Cry"	Johnnie Ray & The Four Lads
4	"You Belong to Me"	Jo Stafford with Paul Weston
5	"Auf Wiederseh'n, Sweetheart"	Vera Lynn with Her Majesty's Forces and Roland Shaw
6	"Half as Much"	Rosemary Clooney with Percy Faith
7	"Wish You Were Here"	Eddie Fisher with Hugo Winterhalter
8	"I Went to Your Wedding"	Patti Page
9	"Here in My Heart"	Al Martino
10	"Delicado"	Percy Faith with Stan Freeman
11	"Kiss of Fire"	Georgia Gibbs with Glenn Osser
12	"Anytime"	Eddie Fisher with Hugo Winterhalter
13	"Tell Me Why"	The Four Aces featuring Al Alberts
14	"The Blacksmith Blues"	Ella Mae Morse with Nelson Riddle
15	"Jambalaya (On the Bayou)"	Jo Stafford with Paul Weston and The Norman Luboff Choir
16	"Botch-a-Me (Ba-Ba-Baciami Piccina)"	Rosemary Clooney
17	"A Guy Is a Guy"	Doris Day with Paul Weston
18	"The Little White Cloud That Cried"	Johnnie Ray & The Four Lads
19	"High Noon"	Frankie Laine
20	"I'm Yours"	Eddie Fisher with Hugo Winterhalter
21	"The Glow-Worm"	The Mills Brothers and Hal McIntyre
22	"It's in the Book"	Johnny Standley with Horace Heidt
23	"Slow Poke"	Pee Wee King with Redd Stewart
24	"Walkin' My Baby Back Home"	Johnnie Ray with Buddy Cole
25	"Meet Mister Callaghan"	Les Paul
26	"I'm Yours"	Don Cornell with Norman Leyden
27	"I'll Walk Alone"	Don Cornell with Norman Leyden
28	"Tell Me Why"	Eddie Fisher with Hugo Winterhalter
29	"Trying"	The Hilltoppers
30	"Please, Mr. Sun"	Johnnie Ray & The Four Lads

== See also ==
- 1952 in music
- List of Billboard number-one singles of 1952
