= Ballad Essentials =

Compilation album by Susannah McCorkle
- Released: 2002
- Genre: Vocal jazz, traditional pop
- Label: Concord Jazz

Susannah McCorkle chronology
The Beginning 1975 (2002)	Ballad Essentials (2002)

Ballad Essentials is an album by Susannah McCorkle, released in 2002.

== Reception ==
Professional ratings
Review scores
Source	Rating
Allmusic	4/5 stars

Music critic Ronnie D. Lankford of Allmusic praised the album and wrote "For those less familiar with the great vocalist's work, Ballad Essentials serves as an excellent primer. For fans, the album gathers a dozen similarly toned pieces, or an hour's worth of music, in one place. A fine collection."

== Track listing ==
No.	Title	Writer(s)	Length
1.	"How Long Has This Been Going On?"	George Gershwin/Ira Gershwin	5:18
2.	"You Go to My Head"	J. Fred Coots/Haven Gillespie	4:07
3.	"For All We Know"	Coots/Sam M. Lewis	3:10
4.	"Why Don't We Try Staying Home?"	Cole Porter	4:25
5.	"Skylark"	Hoagy Carmichael/Johnny Mercer	3:32
6.	"Manhã de Carnaval"	Luiz Bonfá/Antônio Maria/McCorkle	4:48
7.	"Nuages"	Django Reinhardt/Jacques Larue/McCorkle	5:00
8.	"The People That You Never Get to Love"	Rupert Holmes	5:09
9.	"Let's Face the Music and Dance"	Irving Berlin	5:39
10.	"There's No Business Like Show Business"	Berlin	6:04
11.	"It Never Entered My Mind"	Richard Rodgers/Lorenz Hart	5:03
12.	"P.S. I Love You"	Gordon Jenkins/Mercer	4:10

== Personnel ==
- Susannah McCorkle – vocals
- Allen Farnham – piano, arranger, musical director
- Conrad Herwig – trombone
- Greg Gisbert – flugelhorn
- Digby Fairweather – cornet
- Duncan Lamont – flute
- Chris Potter – flute
- Scott Hamilton – tenor saxophone
- Ken Peplowski – clarinet
- Benny Aronov – piano
- Keith Ingham – piano
- Howard Alden – guitar
- Al Gafa – guitar
- Paul Meyers – guitar
- Bucky Pizzarelli – guitar
- Emily Remler – guitar
- Steve Gilmore – bass
- Dennis Irwin – bass
- Kiyoshi Kitagawa – bass
- Steve LaSpina – bass
- Ron Rubin – bass
- Richard Sarpola – bass
- Joe Cocuzzo – drums
- Keith Copeland – drums
- Richard DeRosa – drums, synthesizer
- Derek Hogg – drums
- Vanderlei Pereira – drums
- Chuck Redd – drums
- Thiago de Mello – percussion
- Scott Yanow – liner notes
