= Violet Reiser =

American composer, educator, organist and pianist (1905-1981)

Violet Reiser (3 July 1905 - 25 February 1981) was an American composer, educator, organist, and pianist. She published over 100 keyboard compositions, recorded commercially, and played organ in theatres and on the radio.

Reiser was born to Esther and Henry Reiser in New York City, where she lived most of her life. She studied music with Clarence Adler, David Brown, Herman Schwartzman and Gary Sheldon.

Reiser was the youngest organist to play in Loews Theatres. She performed at other New York City venues, such as the Rialto Theatre, and was the solo organist at the Pythian Temple for several years.

Reiser also played on the following commercial recordings:

- In Gay Madrid (Eliot Lawrence Septet) SESAC 1107/8
- Morning in Manhattan (Eddie Safranski’s Rhythm and Romance Orchestra) SESAC 909/10
- Plantation Picnic (Savoy Orchestra) SESAC N 4801/2
- Smitten Kittens (Buddy Weeds Quartet) SESAC PA 209/10.

== Works ==
A versatile composer for keyboards, Reiser published many works for young piano students, as well as at least two arrangements, a book, concert pieces, and songs. Her works were published by Century Music, Cherio Music Publishing Co., Musicord Publications, Sam Fox, Southern Music, Sterling Music, Summy-Birchard, and Theodore Presser, and included:

=== Arrangements ===
- Melody of Love (Hans Engelman)
- The Glow Worm (Paul Lincke)

=== Book ===
- Keyboard Security

=== Piano ===
- many pieces for young students
- ballet music
- tangos
- waltzes

=== Vocal ===
- “A Bouquet of Violets”
- “Blossoms in My Garden”
- “I Won’t Play Second Fiddle”
- “Israel, Israel”
- “Take Our Love Out of the Shadows”
- “When Love has Taken Wings”
