= From Broken Hearts to Blue Skies =

Studio album by Susannah McCorkle
- Released: 1999
- Recorded: October 27–29, 1998 in New York City
- Genre: Vocal Jazz, Classic pop
- Length: 59:19
- Label: Concord Jazz
- Producer: Nick Phillips

Susannah McCorkle chronology
Someone to Watch Over Me—Songs of George Gershwin (1998)	From Broken Hearts to Blue Skies (1999)	Hearts and Minds (2000)

From Broken Hearts to Blue Skies is an album by Susannah McCorkle released in 1999.

== Reception ==
Professional ratings
Review scores
Source	Rating
Allmusic	3/5 stars
The Penguin Guide to Jazz Recordings	3.5/4 stars

Music critic Paula Edelstein of Allmusic praised the album and wrote "McCorkle's singing is straight from the heart and soul and she's clearly towering in blue skies as one of America's finest interpreters of the classic song."

== Track listing ==
1. "Laughing at Life" (Cornell Todd, Nick Kenny, Charles Kenny, Bob Todd) – 4:06
2. "Something to Live For" (Billy Strayhorn, Duke Ellington) – 5:36
3. "Look for the Silver Lining" (Jerome Kern, Buddy DeSylva, Susannah McCorkle) – 4:02
4. "Nuages" (Django Reinhardt, Jacques Larue, McCorkle) – 5:00
5. "Caminhos Cruzados" (Antonio Carlos Jobim, Newton Mendonça) – 4:26
6. "I Wish I Were in Love Again" (Richard Rodgers, Lorenz Hart) – 3:59
7. "I Ain't Gonna Play No Second Fiddle" (Perry Bradford) – 2:17
8. "Losing Hand" (Charles Calhoun) – 5:40
9. "I Want to Be a Sideman" (Dave Frishberg) – 4:44
10. "Insensatez" (Jobim, Vinicius de Moraes, Norman Gimbel) – 2:06
11. "A Phone Call to the Past" (Henry Mancini, Johnny Mercer) – 5:02
12. "Stop, Time" (David Shire, Richard Maltby Jr.) – 4:17
13. "Wave" (Jobim) – 4:09
14. "Blue Skies" (Irving Berlin) – 3:20

== Personnel ==
- Susannah McCorkle – vocals
- Allen Farnham – musical director, piano
- Greg Gisbert – flugelhorn (tracks 2, 3 & 6), trumpet (track 14)
- John Fedchock – trombone (tracks 2, 3, 6 & 14)
- Dick Oatts – tenor saxophone (tracks 5, 6, 8, 9, 13 & 14), soprano saxophone (tracks 2 & 3), alto flute (track 2)
- Al Gafa – acoustic guitar (tracks 2, 4, 5 & 13), electric guitar (tracks 1, 3, 6, 8. 9. & 14)
- Steve Gilmore – double bass (all selections except tracks 4, 10 & 12)
- Rich DeRosa – drums (all selections except tracks 4, 10 & 12)

All selections arranged by Allen Farnham, except "Something to Live For" and "Blue Skies" arranged by Rich DeRosa
