= Tracy's Theme =

1959 single by Spencer Ross

Single by Spencer Ross
- B-side: "Thanksgiving Day" Parade
- Released: 1959
- Recorded: 1959
- Genre: Pop
- Length: 2:55
- Label: Columbia
- Songwriter: Robert Ascher
- Producer: Robert Mersey (uncredited)

Spencer Ross singles chronology
"Tracy's Theme" (1959)	"Theme of a Lonely Evening" (1960)

"Tracy's Theme" is a 1959 instrumental written by Robert Ascher and recorded by producer, conductor and arranger Robert Mersey under the name "Spencer Ross". The fictitious name may have been used because Mersey was under contract to a record label other than Columbia, which released "Tracy's Theme", at the time of the recording. It peaked at #13 on the Billboard Hot 100 in 1960, after being used as the theme for a TV production of The Philadelphia Story.

== Origin ==
As part of the December 7, 1959 airing on NBC of a new television production of The Philadelphia Story, composer Robert Ascher wrote a melody to be associated with the character of Tracy Lord, played by Diana Lynn on the TV special. Talent Associates, the production company that owned the special, thought the tune had hit potential, so the company worked out a deal with Columbia Records to issue it as a single. This presented a problem for Mersey, the musical director for Talent Associates, as he was under contract with the new Big Top label as its musical director as well; he had already released a single, "Bittersweet September," on the label in July 1959.

Devon Music, the publishing firm of Talent Associates owned by David Susskind and Howie Richmond at the time, came up with a solution. They created a fictitious artist named "Spencer Ross", and retained ownership of that pseudonym for potential future use.

"Tracy's Theme" was reviewed in the November 23, 1959 issue of Billboard, two weeks before The Philadelphia Story aired. Another Ascher melody from a Talent Associates production, "Thanksgiving Day Parade" from the November 27, 1959 airing of Miracle on 34th Street, was used as the B-side.

Neither Mersey nor the fictitious Ross were the real stars of the recording; Vincent J. "Jimmy" Abato (1919-2008), a one-time member of Glenn Miller's orchestra, played the hypnotic melody on the alto saxophone, with the accompaniment of strings and a repeated percussion beat.

== Reaction ==
A reported 20 million viewers watched the special presentation of The Philadelphia Story. With the single already on the market, and promotional copies in the hands of radio stations, it was only a matter of time before the popular theme started to sell; "Tracy's Theme" entered the Billboard Hot 100 on January 4, 1960 and reached a peak of #13 on February 22. In the Billboard Top Singles of 1960 ranking at the end of the year, it finished #81.

After "Tracy's Theme" became a hit, Mersey received permission to use the Spencer Ross pseudonym on his next Big Top single, "Theme of a Lonely Evening" backed with "Bobby's Blues", but after that, the rights to the Ross name reverted to Devon Music. Two more Spencer Ross singles and a full-length LP, which included "Tracy's Theme" in addition to non-Mersey productions, were issued on Columbia before the end of 1960.

== Cover versions ==
- "Tracy's Theme" would later be covered by instrumentalist Billy Vaughn on his number-one album Theme from "A Summer Place" (and Other Great Themes).
