= Hearts and Minds (album) =

Studio album by Susannah McCorkle
- Released: August 8, 2000
- Recorded: March 28–30, 2000
- Studio: Sound on Sound, New York City
- Genre: Vocal jazz, traditional pop
- Length: 66:37
- Label: Concord Jazz

Susannah McCorkle chronology
From Broken Hearts to Blue Skies (1999)	Hearts and Minds (2000)	Most Requested Songs (2001)

Hearts and Minds is the sixteenth album by jazz singer Susannah McCorkle. It peaked at number 16 on the Billboard Top Jazz Albums chart.

This was Susannah McCorkle's last set of recordings. She died by suicide in May 2001.

== Reception ==
Professional ratings
Review scores
Source	Rating
Allmusic	4.5/5 stars
The Penguin Guide to Jazz Recordings	3.5/4 stars

Music critic Paula Edelstein of Allmusic praised the album and wrote McCorkle "has the remarkable capability to bring rarely heard songs back to life through updated interpretations and 21st century appeal." The Penguin Guide to Jazz Recordings says that the album is close to being McCorkle's masterpiece.

== Tracks ==
1. "I Can Dream, Can't I?" (Sammy Fain, Irving Kahal)
2. "Love Is Here to Stay" (George Gershwin, Ira Gershwin)
3. "Love, Look Away" (Richard Rodgers, Oscar Hammerstein II)
4. "My Attorney Bernie" (Dave Frishberg)
5. "For All We Know" (J. Fred Coots, Sam M. Lewis)
6. "It Could Happen to You" (Johnny Burke, Jimmy Van Heusen)
7. "Haunted Heart" (Arthur Schwartz, Howard Dietz)
8. "What Did I Forget?" (Frishberg)
9. "Down" (Simon Wallace, Fran Landesman)
10. "The Computer Age (In Motion)" (Thelmo Porto)
11. "Evolution" (Ivan Lins, Brock Patrick Walsh)
12. "Feet Do Your Stuff" (Simon Wallace, Fran Landesman)
13. "Do You Miss New York?" (Frishberg)
14. "Scars" (Wallace, Landesman)
15. "I Don't Want to Set the World on Fire" (Bennie Benjamin, Eddie Durham, Sol Marcus, Eddie Seiler)

== Personnel ==
- Susannah McCorkle – vocals
- Allen Farnham – piano, arranger, musical director
- Dick Oatts – saxophone (1, 2, 4, 6–10, 12, 13, 15)
- Paul Meyers – electric & acoustic guitars (tracks 1, 2, 4–13, 15)
- Steve Gilmore – double bass (tracks 2, 3, 4, 6, 9, 12, 13, 15)
- Dennis Irwin – double bass (tracks 1, 5, 7, 8, 10, 11)
- Tim Horner – drums (tracks 2, 3, 4, 6, 9, 12, 13, 15)
- Vanderlei Pereira – drums (tracks 1, 5, 7, 8, 10, 11)
- Thiago DeMello – percussion (tracks 1, 5, 7, 8, 10, 11)
