= Mel and George "Do" World War II =

Live album by Mel Tormé and George Shearing
- Released: 1990
- Recorded: September 2–3, 1990
- Genre: Vocal jazz, Jazz
- Length: 62:38
- Label: Concord
- Producer: Carl Jefferson

Mel Tormé chronology
Night at the Concord Pavilion (1990)	Mel and George "Do" World War II (1990)	Mel Tormé Live at the Fujitsu–Concord Festival 1990 (1990)

George Shearing chronology
Piano (1989)	Mel and George "Do" World War II (1990)	Get Happy! (1991)

Mel and George "Do" World War II is a 1990 live album by the American jazz singer Mel Tormé and the British jazz pianist George Shearing.

Professional ratings
Review scores
Source	Rating
Allmusic	4.5/5 stars
The Penguin Guide to Jazz Recordings	2/4 stars

== Track listing ==
1. "Lili Marlene" (Tommie Connor, Hans Leip, Norbert Schultze) – 6:18
2. "Love" (Ralph Blane, Hugh Martin) – 6:13
3. "Aren't You Glad You're You?" (Johnny Burke, Jimmy Van Heusen) – 5:35
4. Duke Ellington Medley: "Cotton Tail"/"I Didn't Know About You"/"Don't Get Around Much Anymore"/"I'm Beginning to See the Light" (Duke Ellington)/(Ellington, Bob Russell)/(Ellington, Russell)/(Don George, Johnny Hodges, Harry James) – 3:39
5. "I Don't Want to Walk Without You"/"I'll Walk Alone" (Frank Loesser, Jule Styne)/(Styne, Sammy Cahn) – 4:30
6. "I Could Write a Book" (Richard Rodgers, Lorenz Hart) – 5:29
7. "A Lovely Way to Spend an Evening" (Harold Adamson, Jimmy McHugh) – 6:18
8. "On the Swing Shift"/"The Five O'Clock Whistle" (Harold Arlen, Johnny Mercer)/(Kim Gannon, William C. K. Irwin, Josef Myrow) – 4:17
9. "Ac-Cent-Tchu-Ate the Positive" (Mercer, Arlen) – 5:18
10. "This is the Army, Mister Jones" (Irving Berlin) – 3:30
11. "We Mustn't Say Goodbye" (Al Dubin, James V. Monaco) – 3:13
12. "I've Heard That Song Before" (Cahn, Styne) – 4:10
13. "I Know Why (and So Do You)" (Harry Warren, Mack Gordon) – 5:15

== Personnel ==
- Mel Tormé - vocals
- George Shearing - piano
- Neil Swainson - double bass
- Donny Osborne - drums
