= P.S. I Love You (1934 song) =

1934 popular song

Single by Rudy Vallée and His Connecticut Yankees
- A-side: "Strange"
- Published: 1934
- Released: September 26, 1934
- Recorded: September 9, 1934
- Genre: Traditional pop
- Length: 3:29
- Label: Victor
- Composer: Gordon Jenkins
- Lyricist: Johnny Mercer

"P.S. I Love You" is a popular song with music by Gordon Jenkins and lyrics by Johnny Mercer, published in 1934.

The original hit version in 1934 was recorded by Rudy Vallée, released by RCA Victor. It was revived in 1953 by The Hilltoppers, in the 1960s by The Vogues, and again in 1984 by country music singer Tom T. Hall. A number of other versions have also been recorded. The lyrics describe somebody writing a love letter to their partner.

== Recorded versions ==
- The Angels released a version in 1960 while they were still called The Starlets. The version went to number 106 in the U.S.
- Rosemary Clooney - Rosemary Clooney Sings the Lyrics of Johnny Mercer (1988)
- James Darren - Gidget Goes Hawaiian / James Darren Sings the Movies (1961)
- Bob Dylan - Triplicate (2017)
- The Four Vagabonds - Apollo 1057 (1947); reissued Lloyds 45-102 (1953)
- Tom T. Hall (1984)- his final Top 10 country hit, and one of only two he did not write
- Lionel Hampton
- The Hilltoppers
- Don Burke and the Four Hits and a Miss with Gordon Jenkins and his orchestra
- Billie Holiday recorded the song for Verve Records on September 3, 1954, in Los Angeles, with Her Orchestra, consisting of Harry Edison on trumpet, Willie Smith on alto saxophone, Bobby Tucker on piano, Barney Kessel on guitar, Red Callender on bass and Chico Hamilton on drums. The song is featured on the 1999 reissue of Lady Sings the Blues.
- Bent Jædig
- Diana Krall
- Nancy LaMott
- Ketty Lester - Love Letters (1962)
- Anne Lloyd with Larry Clinton Orchestra - Bell 1004 (1954)
- Susannah McCorkle - Ballad Essentials (2002)
- Nellie McKay, for the 2007 P.S. I Love You film soundtrack
- Bette Midler for the 1991 For the Boys film soundtrack
- Frank Sinatra - Close to You (1957)
- Kay Starr - I Cry By Night (1962)
- Lew Stone and His Band - Alan Kane, vocal - UK Decca F.5241 (1934)
- Dodie Stevens
- Mel Tormé - for his album That's All (1965)
- Rudy Vallée and His Connecticut Yankees - Victor 24723 (1934)
- Bobby Vinton, included in his 1967 album Please Love Me Forever
- The Vogues
- Jimmy Witherspoon - for his album Blues for Easy Livers (1966)
- Mary Ann McCall with Woody Herman (1947)
