= From Bessie to Brazil =

Studio album by Susannah McCorkle
- Released: 1993
- Recorded: February 1–3, 1993 in New York City
- Genre: Vocal Jazz, Classic pop
- Label: Concord Jazz
- Producer: Carl Jefferson

Susannah McCorkle chronology
I'll Take Romance (1992)	From Bessie to Brazil (1993)	From Broadway to Bebop (1994)

From Bessie To Brazil is a 1993 album by jazz vocalist Susannah McCorkle. It peaked at number 20 on the Billboard Top Jazz Albums chart.

== Reception ==
Professional ratings
Review scores
Source	Rating
AllMusic	4/5 stars
The Penguin Guide to Jazz Recordings	3.5/4 stars

Music critic Scott Yanow of AllMusic praised the album and called it "a fine all-round showcase for the talented singer."

== Track listing ==
No.	Title	Writer(s)	Length
1.	"Love"	Hugh Martin, Ralph Blane	3:33
2.	"The People That You Never Get To Love"	Rupert Holmes	4:47
3.	"Thief in The Night"	Arthur Schwartz, Howard Dietz	3:49
4.	"The Waters of March"	Antonio Carlos Jobim	4:01
5.	"Ac-Cent-Tchu-Ate the Positive"	Harold Arlen, Johnny Mercer	4:05
6.	"How Deep Is the Ocean?"	Irving Berlin	4:07
7.	"The Lady Is a Tramp"	Richard Rodgers, Lorenz Hart	4:56
8.	"Quality Time"	Dave Frishberg	4:24
9.	"My Sweetie Went Away"	Lou Handman, Roy Turk	3:19
10.	"Still Crazy After All These Years"	Paul Simon	4:16
11.	"Adeus America"	Geraldo Jacques, Haroldo Barbosa, Susannah McCorkle	6:13
12.	"That Ole Devil Called Love"	Allan Roberts, Doris Fisher	2:37
13.	"Hit the Road to Dreamland"	Harold Arlen, Johnny Mercer	5:19
14.	"You Go to My Head"	J. Fred Coots, Haven Gillespie	4:09

== In popular culture ==
McCorkle's cover of "The Waters of March" was featured in the end credits of the 2002 documentary film Comedian. Subsequently, Matt Johnson and Jay McCarrol, inspired heavily by the documentary, also used McCorkle's version in the end credits of Nirvanna the Band the Show the Movie.

== Personnel ==
- Susannah McCorkle - vocals
- Allen Farnham - piano, musical director
- Howard Alden – guitar
- Kiyoshi Kitagawa - bass
- Chuck Redd – drums
- Randy Sandke – trumpet, flugelhorn
- Dick Oatts – alto saxophone, flute
- Ken Peplowski – tenor saxophone, clarinet
- Robert Trowers – trombone

“Thief in The Night” & “The People That You Never Get To Love” arranged by Allen Farnham;
“The Lady Is a Tramp” & “Hit the Road to Dreamland” arranged by Ben Aronov;
“Ac-Cent-Tchu-Ate the Positive” & “Love” arranged by Richard De Rosa.
