= Meet Mister Callaghan =

Single by Les Paul

from the album The Hit Makers!
- A-side: "Take Me in Your Arms and Hold Me"
- Released: August 18, 1952
- Genre: Jazz
- Length: 1:48
- Label: Capitol
- Songwriter: Eric Spear

Les Paul singles chronology
"I'm Confessin' (That I Love You)" (1952)	"Meet Mister Callaghan" (1952)	"My Baby's Coming Home" (1952)

"Meet Mister Callaghan" is a 1952 song written by Eric Spear and performed by Les Paul in a hit recording.

== Background ==
It reached number 5 on the U.S. pop chart in 1952. It was featured on Paul's and Mary Ford's 1953 album The Hit Makers! The song was used in the 1954 film Meet Mr. Callaghan.

The single ranked number 25 on Billboard's Year-End top 30 singles of 1952.

== Other charting versions ==
- Mitch Miller released a version of the song as a single in 1952 which reached number 23 on the U.S. pop chart.
- Carmen Cavallaro and His Orchestra released a version of the song as a single in 1952 which reached number 28 on the U.S. pop chart.

== Other versions ==
- Chet Atkins released a version of the song as the B-side to his 1952 single "Chinatown, My Chinatown".
- Jan August and Jerry Murad's Harmonicats released a version of the song as a single in 1952, but it did not chart.
- Lawrence Welk and His Champagne Music released a version of the song as a single in 1952, but it did not chart.
- Guy Lombardo and His Royal Canadians released a version of the song on his 1959 album Instrumentally Yours.
- The Three Suns released a version of the song on their 1960 album On a Magic Carpet.
- Frankie Carle: His Piano and His Orchestra released a version of the song on their 1964 album 30 Hits of the Fantastic 50's as part of a medley with the songs "The Old Piano Roll Blues" and "Little Rock Getaway".
- Eddie Adcock and Talk of the Town released a version of the song on their 1988 album The Acoustic Collection.
- The Ventures released a version of the song on their 1961 album Another Smash!!! and on their 1990 album The EP Collection.
- Cyril Stapleton and His Orchestra released a version of the song on their 2003 album Decca Singles.
- Frank Chacksfield released a version of the song on his 2007 album In the Limelight.
