= On the Swing Shift =

"On the Swing Shift" is a 1942 song composed by Harold Arlen with lyrics by Johnny Mercer for the film Star Spangled Rhythm, where it was introduced by Marjorie Reynolds, Betty Jane Rhodes and Dona Drake.

The song is about a romance between workers in an aircraft factory during the Second World War working the "swing shift"; between 4pm and midnight. Glenn T. Eskew described the song as "one of the first songs to recognize the new role of women laboring in the factories" and one of several lyrics Mercer wrote that "betrayed a weakening of traditional constraints of societal norms" during the war in his 2013 biography of Mercer, Johnny Mercer: Southern Songwriter for the World.

Mel Tormé and George Shearing performed the song on their 1990 live album Mel and George "Do" World War II. Tormé later described the song as "a personal favorite of mine" in his 1994 book My Singing Teachers.
