= Allen Farnham =

- Born: Allen Nicholas Farnham; May 19, 1961 (age 64); Boston, Massachusetts, US
- Genres: Jazz
- Occupations: Musician, composer, arranger, educator, record producer
- Instrument: Piano
- Years active: 1984–present
- Label: Concord Jazz
- Website: allenfarnham.com

Allen Nicholas Farnham (born May 19, 1961) is a record producer, educator, jazz pianist, composer, and arranger. He has recorded several albums under his own name – as a soloist, in a small group, and with a big band.

== Early life ==
Farnham was born in Boston on May 19, 1961. He "first played piano when he was 12 and in 1983 he graduated from the Oberlin Conservatory of Music in Ohio".

== Later life and career ==
Farnham moved to New York City in the following year. He played as a freelance, then signed to Concord Records in 1986. "Between 1986 and 1990 he led his own quartet, with either Joe Lovano or Dick Oatts on saxophone and Drew Gress and Jamey Haddad filling out the rhythm section, and from 1990 he was pianist and music director for Susannah McCorkle."

Farnham has produced more than 50 albums for Concord. He is a faculty member at New Jersey City University.

== Discography ==
=== As leader/co-leader ===
Year recorded	Title	Label	Notes
1989	5th House	Concord Jazz	With Tom Harrell (trumpet, flugelhorn), Joe Lovano (soprano sax, tenor sax), Drew Gress (bass; separately), Jamey Haddad (drums)
1992	Play-cation	Concord Jazz	With Dick Oatts (soprano sax, alto sax, tenor sax), Rufus Reid and Drew Gress (bass), Jamey Haddad (drums)
1986–94	The Common Thread	Concord Jazz	Some tracks solo piano; some tracks trio, with Drew Gress (bass), Jamey Haddad (drums); some tracks quartet, with Joe Lovano added
1994	Allen Farnham at Maybeck	Concord Jazz	Solo piano; in concert
1996	Meets the RIAS Big Band	Concord Jazz	With the RIAS Big Band

=== As sideman ===
Year recorded	Leader	Title	Label
1988	Mel Tormé	Reunion	Concord
1988	Mel Tormé	In Concert Tokyo	Concord
	Gust William Tsilis	Pale Fire	Enja
1991	Susannah McCorkle	I'll Take Romance	Concord Jazz
1993	Susannah McCorkle	From Bessie to Brazil	Concord Jazz
1998	Susannah McCorkle	From Broken Hearts to Blue Skies	Concord Jazz
1998?	Masahiro Yoshida	Uno	DIW
2000	Roseanna Vitro	Conviction: Thoughts of Bill Evans	A
2000	Susannah McCorkle	Hearts and Minds	Concord Jazz
2008?	Mark Sherman	Live at the Bird's Eye	Miles High
2010?	John Fedchock	Live at the Red Sea Jazz Festival	Capri
2015?	John Fedchock	Like It Is	Mama

Main source:
