= Hazel Skaggs =

American author, composer, and music educator

Hazel Ann Ghazarian Skaggs (August 26, 1920 – March 4, 2005) was an American author, composer, and music educator who specialized in piano pedagogy. She published under the name Hazel Ghazarian.

Ghazarian was born in Boston to Armenian parents, Seeran Bardezbanian and Hagop Ghazarian. She married Paul Skaggs. She earned a pedagogy diploma from the New England Conservatory of Music; a B.A. and M.A. in psychology from Fairleigh Dickinson University and an artist diploma from the American College of Musicians. She also studied at the Universities of Colorado, Minnesota, and Wisconsin. Her teachers included Dr. Clarence Adler, Howard Goding, Ernst Levy, and Gladys Ondricek.

During her years at New England Conservatory, Ghazarian wrote short stories for the Boston Post and many professional journals. She contributed to The Art of Teaching Piano (edited by Denes Agay). She was a deacon in the Armenian Presbyterian Church and enjoyed folk dancing as a hobby.

She belonged to and held office in several professional organizations, including:

- American Society of Composers, Authors, and Publishers (ASCAP)
- National Guild of Piano Teachers (national chair 1964-1992)
- Piano Teachers Congress of New York City (president 1975-1979)
- Professional Music Teachers Guild of New Jersey (Board of Directors 1987).

The Professional Music Teachers Guild of New Jersey established the Hazel Ghazarian Skaggs Memorial Piano Competition which continues today. The Piano Teachers Congress presents Hazel Ghazarian Skaggs Awards to outstanding students.

Ghazarian’s music and writing were published by the Boston Music Company, Carl Fischer Music, Century Music Publishing Company, Schroeder & Gunther Inc., Summy Birchard, and the Willis Music Company. She composed some songs for soprano. Her articles and compositions for piano included:

== Articles ==
- “A Hypothesis and a Look Inward” (Piano Quarterly)
- “A Plea for the Transfer Pupil” (Music Journal)
- “Decentralization in Music is Necessary!” (The Etude)
- “Group Piano Teaching” (Journal of the American Liszt Society)
- “How Can We Save the Beginner?” (Music Journal)
- “Is the Make Up Lesson Necessary?” (Music Journal Anthology)
- “Teachers Are Not Born” (Music Journal)
- “What About Student Recitals?” (Music Journal)

== Piano ==
- Flight to the Moon
- Impressions of Snow
- Little Blue Lady
- Little Girl from Mars
- Merry Cricket
- Petite Ballerina
- Phantom Waltz
- Polka Dot Clown
- Prelude and Fugue
- Sonata
- Spring Showers
- Thumbs Under (exercise book)
- Toccatina
