= Clarence Adler =

American pianist (1886–1969)

- Born: March 10, 1886; Cincinnati, Ohio, US
- Died: December 24, 1969 (aged 83) New York City, New York, US
- Occupations: Pianist and educator
- Instrument: Piano
- Formerly of: Hekking Trio; New York Trio

Clarence Adler (March 10, 1886 – December 24, 1969) was an American musician. He was a pianist, and a soloist for many leading orchestras in the United States and abroad. He was the private music instructor for composer Aaron Copland and other notable musicians.

== Early life ==
Adler was born in Cincinnati, Ohio on March 10, 1886. His father was German Jewish immigrant streetcar driver. Adler delivered newspapers to supplement his family's income when he was seven to twelve years old.

When he was eleven years old, Adler met Romeo Gorno, a pianist and professor at the College of Music of Cincinnati and became fascinated with classical music. Adler won a scholarship to the College of Music of Cincinnati at age twelve with the help of Gorno. After he turned eighteen, he went to Berlin, Germany to study with Leopold Godowsky.

== Career ==
Adler began touring the Midwest and Southern United States when he was twelve years old, under Romeo Gorno. In 1920, Adler found success and acclaim in Europe as the pianist in the Hekking Trio, a chamber music group. He returned to Cincinnati and continued his ensemble endeavors. He was a pianist, and a soloist for many leading chamber groups and orchestras in the United States and Europe.

In 1913 he moved to New York City. There, he performed with the Kneisel Quarter, the New York Philharmonic under Willem Mengelberg and the New York Symphony Orchestra under Walter Damrosch. He founded the chamber music group, the New York Trio, in 1919. In 1942, he performed a series of six concerts in New York City, performing the 14 piano concertos of Mozart.

In 1923, he purchased a 100-acre farm three miles outside of Lake Placid, New York which acted as a summer retreat, music camp, concert hall, and teaching center for 40 years. Adler added bungalows for students and guests and recreational activities such as boating, bowling, swimming, and tennis. He named his artist summer colony Ka-ren-ni-o-ke or Karinoke for the American Indian word meaning "the place of beautiful song".

Adler taught at the Institute of Musical Art and gave over sixty private lessons a week, influencing the lives of hundreds of musicians. Adler taught composer Aaron Copland, Richard Franko Goldman who was head of the Peabody School of Music, Walter Hendl who became head of the Eastman School of Music, the Koren prodigy Yung Ho Kim, Broadway composer Richard Rodgers, and composers Violet Reiser and Hazel Ghazarian Skaggs. He taught piano until two weeks before he died.

== Honors ==
The College of Music of Cincinnati awarded Adler an honorary doctorate for his dedication. The community that grew around Karinoke was named Adlerville in his honor in 1926. In April 1964, Adler was honored at a chamber music concert in New York City for the 50th anniversary of his concert debut in New York City.

== Personal life ==
Adler married Elsa Adrienne Richard, a music student, and debutant from Mobile, Alabama. In 1921, they had one child, Richard Adler, the lyricist and composer for the Broadway musicals The Pajama Game and Damn Yankees. He lived at 336 Central Park West in New York City.

Adler died on December 24, 1969, in New York City at the age of 83. His brother Joseph Adler was also a pianist.
