= Theme from A Summer Place (album) =

Studio album by Billy Vaughn and his Orchestra
- Released: 1960
- Genre: easy listening
- Length: 30:26
- Label: Dot Records

Billy Vaughn and his Orchestra chronology
| Linger Awhile (1960) | Theme from A Summer Place (1960) | Golden Waltzes (1960) |

Theme from A Summer Place (And Other Great Themes) is a studio album released by Billy Vaughn in 1960 on Dot LP record DLP 3276 (mono) 25276 (stereo). The album topped Billboard's album charts in 1960 for two weeks, and stayed in the charts for a total of 62 weeks.

== Track listing ==
| No. | Title | Length |
|---|---|---|
| 1. | "Theme from A Summer Place" (Max Steiner) | 2:26 |
| 2. | "Tammy" (Livingston - Evans) | 2:15 |
| 3. | "Tracy's Theme" (R. Ascher) | 2:53 |
| 4. | "Climb Every Mountain" (Rodgers - Hammerstein) | 2:23 |
| 5. | "Que Sera, Sera" (Livingston - Evans) | 2:20 |
| 6. | "The Terry Theme from Limelight" (Charles Chaplin) | 2:31 |
| 7. | "True Love" (Cole Porter) | 2:14 |
| 8. | "The Sound of Music" (Rodgers - Hammerstein) | 2:36 |
| 9. | "The Three Penny Opera (Moritat)" (Kurt Weill - Brecht) | 3:12 |
| 10. | "Some Enchanted Evening" (Rodgers - Hammerstein) | 2:29 |
| 11. | "All the Way" (Cahn - Van Heusen) | 3:01 |
| 12. | "Sayonara" (Irving Berlin) | 2:06 |
| Total length: | | 30:26 |
