= Piano (George Shearing album) =

Studio album by George Shearing
- Released: May 1989
- Recorded: 1989
- Genre: Jazz
- Length: 53:26
- Label: Concord
- Producer: Carl Jefferson

George Shearing chronology
George Shearing in Dixieland (1988)	Piano (1989)	Mel and George "Do" World War II (1989)

Piano is a 1989 solo album by jazz pianist George Shearing.

== Reception ==
Professional ratings
Review scores
Source	Rating
AllMusic	2.5/5 stars
The Penguin Guide to Jazz	3/4 stars

Scott Yanow reviewed the album for AllMusic and wrote that "The emphasis is on slower tempos and relaxed improvising but Shearing's distinctive solos and subtle creativity hold on to one's interest throughout. A tasteful set".

== Track listing ==
1. "It Had to Be You" (Isham Jones, Gus Kahn) – 4:30
2. "Daisy" – 5:15
3. "Thinking of You" – 2:47
4. "Sweet and Lovely" (Gus Arnheim, Charles N. Daniels, Harry Tobias) – 3:43
5. "It's You or No One" (Sammy Cahn, Jule Styne) – 2:23
6. "Wendy" (Milt Raskin, George Shearing) – 3:55
7. "Am I Blue?" (Harry Akst, Grant Clarke) – 3:30
8. "Miss Invisible" – 5:11
9. "You're My Everything" (Mort Dixon, Harry Warren, Joe Young) – 4:22
10. "John O'Groats" – 3:04
11. "Waltz for Claudia" (Kevin Gibbs) – 3:14
12. "For You" (Joe Burke, Al Dubin) – 4:12
13. "Children's Waltz" – 4:06
14. "Happiness Is a Thing Called Joe" (Harold Arlen, E.Y. "Yip" Harburg) – 4:13

== Personnel ==
- George Shearing – piano

Production

- Phil Edwards – engineer
- Willis Conover – liner notes
- George Horn – mastering
- Carl Jefferson – producer
- Richard Avedon – photography
- Jim Hilson – assistant engineer
- Michael McDonald – engineer, remixing
