= Mel Tormé and the Marty Paich Dektette – Reunion =

Studio album by Mel Tormé
- Released: 1988
- Recorded: August 1988 in Los Angeles
- Genre: Vocal jazz
- Length: 44:11
- Label: Concord
- Producer: Carl Jefferson

Mel Tormé chronology
A Vintage Year (1987)	Mel Tormé and the Marty Paich Dektette – Reunion (1988)	Mel Tormé and the Marty Paich Dektette – In Concert Tokyo (1990)

Mel Tormé and the Marty Paich Dektette – Reunion is a 1988 album by the American jazz singer Mel Tormé, accompanied by a big band arranged and led by Marty Paich. It was recorded over three days at Ocean Way Studios, on Sunset at Gower in Hollywood. Alan Sides served as engineer, and Charles Barber as assistant to Marty Paich.

Professional ratings
Review scores
Source	Rating
Allmusic	4.5/5 stars

== Track listing ==
1. "Sweet Georgia Brown" (Ben Bernie, Kenneth Casey, Maceo Pinkard) – 3:05
2. "When You Wish upon a Star"/"I'm Wishing" (Leigh Harline, Ned Washington) – 2:51
3. "Walk Between the Raindrops" (Donald Fagen) – 5:44
4. "The Blues" (Duke Ellington) – 5:18
5. "The Gift"/"One Note Samba"/"How Insensitive" (Antônio Carlos Jobim)/(Jobim, Newton Mendonça)/(Jobim, Norman Gimbel, Vinícius de Moraes) – 4:54
6. "The Trolley Song"/"Get Me to the Church on Time" (Ralph Blane, Hugh Martin)/(Alan Jay Lerner, Frederick Loewe) – 4:45
7. "More Than You Know" (Edward Eliscu, Billy Rose, Vincent Youmans) – 5:48
8. "The Goodbye Look" (Donald Fagen) – 4:45
9. "For Whom the Bell Tolls"/"Spain (I Can Recall)" (Chick Corea, Al Jarreau, Artie Maren)/(Joaquín Rodrigo, Victor Young) – 6:42

== Personnel ==
- Mel Tormé – vocals, drums
- Warren Luening – trumpet
- Jack Sheldon – trumpet
- Dan Barrett – trombone
- Chuck Berghofer – double bass
- Bob Efford – baritone saxophone
- Bob Enevoldsen – valve trombone
- Allen Farnham – piano
- Gary Foster – alto saxophone
- Marty Paich – arranger, conductor
- Ken Peplowski – clarinet, tenor saxophone
- Jim Self – tuba
- John Von Ohlen – drums
