= Trying (The Hilltoppers song) =

1952 single by the Hilltoppers

Single by The Hilltoppers
- B-side: "You Made Up My Mind"
- Released: May 25, 1952
- Genre: Traditional pop
- Length: 2:59
- Label: Dot
- Songwriter(s): Billy Vaughn

The Hilltoppers singles chronology
"Trying" (1952)	"Must I Cry Again" (1952)

"Trying" is a song written by Billy Vaughn and performed by The Hilltoppers. It reached number 5 on the Cashbox chart and number 7 on the U.S. Billboard pop chart in 1952.

The single ranked number 29 on Billboard's year-end top 30 singles of 1952.

== Other charting versions ==
- Ella Fitzgerald, number 22 on the U.S. pop chart in 1952.
- The Hilltoppers, number 30 on the UK Singles Chart in 1956.
- Vaughn, instrumental version, number 77 on the U.S. pop chart in 1958.

== Other versions ==
- Grady Martin and His Slew Foot Five, single in 1952.
- Todd Rhodes Orchestra, single in 1952.
- Timi Yuro, 1961 album Hurt!!!!!!!
- LaVern Baker, 1963 album See See Rider.
- The Four Lads, 1963 album Oh, Happy Day.
- Bobby Vinton, 1964 album There! I've Said It Again.
- Bob Gutman featuring The Ink Spots and Whistling Joe, single in 1968.
- Rosco Gordon, 1998 compilation album Bootin' (The Best of RPM Years).
- Texas Tornados, 2001 live album The Complete Live at the Limo Sessions!
