= Night at the Concord Pavilion =

Live jazz album by Mel Tormé (1990)

Live album by Mel Tormé
- Released: 1990
- Recorded: August 1990
- Genre: Vocal jazz
- Length: 44:11
- Label: Concord
- Producer: Carl Jefferson

Mel Tormé chronology
| Mel Tormé and the Marty Paich Dektette – In Concert Tokyo (1988) | Night at the Concord Pavilion (1990) | Mel and George "Do" World War II (1990) |

Professional ratings
Review scores
| Source | Rating |
|---|---|
| Allmusic | 4.5/5 stars |

Night at the Concord Pavilion is a 1990 live album by the American jazz singer Mel Tormé.

== Track listing ==
1. "Sing for Your Supper"/"Sing Sing Sing"/"Sing (Sing a Song)" (Richard Rodgers, Lorenz Hart)/(Louis Prima)/(Joe Raposo)
2. "You Make Me Feel So Young" (Mack Gordon, Josef Myrow)
3. "Early Autumn" (Ralph Burns, Woody Herman, Johnny Mercer)
4. Guys and Dolls medley: "Guys and Dolls"/"Fugue for Tinhorns"/"The Oldest Established"/"If I Were a Bell"/"My Time of Day"/"I've Never Been in Love Before"/"Sit Down, You're Rockin' the Boat"/"Luck Be a Lady"
5. "I Could Have Told You"/"Losing My Mind"/"Deep in a Dream"/"Goin' Out of My Head" (Carl Sigman, Jimmy Van Heusen)/(Stephen Sondheim)/(Eddie DeLange, Van Heusen)/(Teddy Randazzo, Bobby Weinstein)
6. "Too Darn Hot" (Cole Porter)
7. "Day In, Day Out" (Rube Bloom, Mercer)
8. "Down for Double" (Freddie Green)
9. "You're Driving Me Crazy" (Walter Donaldson)
10. "Sent for You Yesterday (and Here You Come Today)" (Count Basie, Eddie Durham, Jimmy Rushing)

All music and lyrics on track four written by Frank Loesser.

== Personnel ==
- Mel Tormé - vocals
- John Campbell - piano
- Bob Maize - double bass
- Donny Osborne - drums

Frank Wess–Harry Edison big band

- Frank Wess - tenor saxophone
- Harry "Sweets" Edison - trumpet
- Joe Newman
- Ray Brown
- Pete Minger
- Al Grey - trombone
- Grover Mitchell
- Benny Powell
- Curtis Peagler - alto saxophone
- Marshal Royal
- Billy Mitchell - tenor saxophone
- Bill Ramsay - baritone saxophone
- Ted Dunbar - guitar
