= Allen Farnham at Maybeck =

Live album by Allen Farnham
- Recorded: June 1994
- Venues: Maybeck Recital Hall, Berkeley, California
- Genre: Jazz
- Label: Concord
- Producer: Carl E. Jefferson

Allen Farnham at Maybeck: Maybeck Recital Hall Series Volume Forty-One is an album of solo performances by jazz pianist Allen Farnham.

== Music and recording ==
The album was recorded at the Maybeck Recital Hall in Berkeley, California in June 1994. The material includes standards and some improvised Farnham originals.

== Release and reception ==
Professional ratings
Review scores
Source	Rating
AllMusic	4.5/5 stars
The Penguin Guide to Jazz	3/4 stars
The Virgin Encyclopedia of Jazz	4/5 stars

The AllMusic reviewer praised Farnham's emotional expression. The Penguin Guide to Jazz described the album as "A solid entry in the [Maybeck] series but hardly one of the essential ones."

== Track listing ==
All tracks composed by Allen Farnham; except where indicated

1. "In Your Own Sweet Way" (Dave Brubeck)
2. "Waltz for Debby" (Bill Evans)
3. "The Carpal Tunnel Blues"
4. "Maybeck Sketch, No. 1"
5. "I Get a Kick Out of You" (Cole Porter)
6. "Never Let Me Go" (Jay Livingston, Ray Evans)
7. "Witch Hunt" (Wayne Shorter)
8. "Maybeck Sketch, No. 2"
9. "I Hear a Rhapsody" (Dick Gasparre, George Fragos, Jack Baker)
10. "Twilight World" (Marian McPartland)
11. "Lover" (Lorenz Hart, Richard Rodgers)

== Personnel ==
- Allen Farnham – piano

Technical

- Bud Spangler, David Luke - engineer
- James Gudeman - photography
