= Mel Tormé and the Marty Paich Dektette – In Concert Tokyo =

Live album by Mel Tormé
- Released: 1988
- Recorded: August 1988 in Tokyo, Japan
- Genre: Jazz
- Length: 44:11
- Label: Concord
- Producer: Carl Jefferson

Mel Tormé chronology
Mel Tormé and the Marty Paich Dektette – Reunion (1988)	Mel Tormé and the Marty Paich Dektette – In Concert Tokyo (1988)	Night at the Concord Pavilion (1990)

Mel Tormé and the Marty Paich Dektette – In Concert Tokyo is a 1988 live album by the American jazz singer Mel Tormé, accompanied by a big band arranged and led by Marty Paich.

Professional ratings
Review scores
Source	Rating
Allmusic	4.5/5 stars

== Track listing ==
1. "It Don't Mean a Thing (If It Ain't Got That Swing)" (Duke Ellington)
2. "Sweet Georgia Brown" (Ben Bernie, Kenneth Casey, Maceo Pinkard)
3. "Just in Time" (Betty Comden, Adolph Green, Jule Styne)
4. "When the Sun Comes Out" (Harold Arlen, Ted Koehler)
5. "Carioca" (Edward Eliscu, Gus Kahn, Vincent Youmans)
6. "More Than You Know" (Eliscu, Rose, Youmans)
7. "Too Close for Comfort" (Jerry Bock, Larry Holofcener, George David Weiss)
8. "The City" (Arthur Hamilton)
9. Medley: "The Gift"/"One Note Samba"/"How Insensitive" (Antônio Carlos Jobim)/(Jobim, Newton Mendonça)/(Jobim, Vinícius de Moraes, Norman Gimbel)
10. "On the Street Where You Live" (Alan Jay Lerner, Frederick Loewe)
11. "Cotton Tail" (Ellington)
12. "The Christmas Song" (Mel Tormé, Robert Wells)

== Personnel ==
- Mel Tormé - vocals, drums
- Warren Luening - trumpet
- Jack Sheldon
- Dan Barrett - trombone
- Chuck Berghofer - double bass
- Bob Efford - baritone saxophone
- Bob Enevoldsen - valve trombone
- Allen Farnham - piano
- Gary Foster - alto saxophone
- Marty Paich - arranger, conductor
- Ken Peplowski - clarinet, tenor saxophone
- Jim Self - tuba
- John Von Ohlen - drums
