= Hans Engelmann =

Hans Engelmann (16 June 1872 – 5 May 1914) was a composer of popular music in the late 19th and early 20th centuries. Although little is remembered of him today, his work was greatly appreciated in his time. Largely writing for teaching material, by the end of his short life he had created nearly three thousand works. His most popular work, Melody of Love has been recorded by many popular musicians in the mid 20th century.

== Biography ==
Hans Engelmann was born in Berlin, Germany. The son of an officer in the Imperial German Army, he was educated in music as most male children of privileged families were during the time. Little else is recorded of his early life. In January 1891, against the wishes of his family (who encouraged Hans to become a doctor), he emigrated to the United States and soon established himself in Philadelphia, Pennsylvania.

Engelmann wrote under the pseudonyms Heinrich Engel, Charles Lindsay and Pierre Renard, as well as his own name, a popular practice among musicians. And although the total volume of work during his lifetime is staggering, only a small amount was intended for performance. Most were written as teaching aids. Engelmann became a charter member of ASCAP, shortly before his death.

Although he never recorded his composition "Melody of Love" himself, a version recorded by Billy Vaughn reached the Billboard Top 100 in 1955. Other versions have been recorded by Pat Boone, Frank Sinatra, and Patsy Kline after lyrics were added in 1954 by Tom Glazer.

Engelmann, who died in 1914, is buried in Hillside Cemetery in Roslyn, Pennsylvania, north of Philadelphia.
