= Mel Tormé Live at the Fujitsu–Concord Festival 1990 =

Live album by Mel Tormé
- Released: 1992
- Recorded: November 11, 1990
- Genre: Vocal jazz
- Length: 52:10
- Label: Concord
- Producer: Carl Jefferson

Mel Tormé chronology
Mel and George "Do" World War II (1990)	Mel Tormé Live at the Fujitsu–Concord Festival 1990 (1992)	Nothing Without You (1992)

Professional ratings
Review scores
Source	Rating
Allmusic	5/5 stars

Mel Tormé Live at the Fujitsu–Concord Festival 1990 is a 1991 live album by the American jazz singer Mel Tormé, recorded in Tokyo.

== Track listing ==
1. "A Shine on Your Shoes" (Howard Dietz, Arthur Schwartz) – 3:19
2. Medley: "Looking at You"/"That Face"/"Look at That Face" (Irving Berlin)/(Lew Spence, Alan Bergman)/(Leslie Bricusse, Anthony Newley) – 4:34
3. "A Nightingale Sang in Berkeley Square" (Eric Maschwitz, Manning Sherwin) – 4:45
4. "Wave" (Antônio Carlos Jobim) – 5:45
5. "Stardust" (Hoagy Carmichael, Mitchell Parish) – 6:02
6. "Don'cha Go 'Way Mad"/"Come to Baby Do" (Jimmy Mundy, Al Stillman, Illinois Jacquet)/(Inez James, Sidney Miller) – 3:51
7. "The Christmas Song"/"Autumn Leaves" (Mel Tormé, Bob Wells)/(Joseph Kosma, Johnny Mercer, Jacques Prévert) – 6:59
8. "You're Driving Me Crazy"/"Moten Swing" (Walter Donaldson)/(Bennie Moten) – 6:21
9. "Sent for You Yesterday (And Here You Come Today)" (Count Basie, Eddie Durham, Jimmy Rushing) – 4:26
10. "Swingin' the Blues" (Basie, Durham, Jon Hendricks) – 4:40
11. "Tokyo State of Mind" (Billy Joel, Tormé) – 5:27

== Personnel ==
- Mel Tormé - vocals
- John Campbell - piano
- Bob Maize - double bass
- Donny Osborne - drums

Frank Wess–Harry Edison big band

- Frank Wess - alto saxophone
- Joe Newman - trumpet
