= Leo Diamond =

American harmonica player (1915–1966)

- Born: June 29, 1915; Brooklyn, New York, U.S.
- Died: September 15, 1966 (aged 51) Los Angeles, California, U.S.
- Genres: Easy listening; space age pop; exotica
- Occupation: Musician
- Instrument: Harmonica
- Years active: 1930–c.1966
- Labels: Ambassador, RCA Victor, ABC-Paramount, Reprise

Leo Diamond (June 29, 1915 – September 15, 1966) was an American harmonica player. He was regarded as a virtuoso of the instrument, and performed in several film scores. Diamond had two US chart hits, "Off Shore" (1953) and "Melody of Love" (1955). He also issued a string of LPs in the 1950s and early 1960s.

== Biography ==
Diamond was born in Brooklyn, New York City, and learned the flute and piccolo before winning a harmonica contest held by bandleader Edwin Franko Goldman in Central Park. Diamond joined Borrah Minevitch's Harmonica Rascals in 1930, and appeared with the group in several films. He arranged and composed tunes for the Harmonica Rascals, toured with them in Europe and South America, and premiered his Concerto for the Harmonica at the Queen's Hall in London.

He left to form his own group, the Solidaires (sometimes cited as the Harmonaires) around 1943. They appeared on American Forces Network radio, and in movies including Coney Island, Hi'ya, Sailor (both 1943), Swing Out, Sister and Forever Yours (both 1945).

By 1950, Diamond started to establish a solo career, principally as a recording artist, although he also performed in clubs across the US. He provided the soundtracks to several films, including Miss Sadie Thompson and The Eddie Cantor Story. His self-penned instrumental, "Off Shore", for Ambassador Records, reached number 14 on the US pop chart in 1953, and he also recorded an album, Harmonica Moods, for the label.

In 1955, RCA Victor released the album Harmonica Magic of Leo Diamond, and Diamond's version of the 1903 song "Melody of Love" reached number 30 on the pop chart. This was followed in 1956 by Skin Diver Suite, described as "the quintessential harmonica opus", with conductor Murray Kellner, one of several attempts by Diamond to raise the reputation of the harmonica as a serious solo instrument.

Diamond then moved to ABC-Paramount Records who released the albums Exciting Sounds from Romantic Places (1959) and Subliminal Sounds (1959). On these albums, Diamond "played all parts on a variety of harmonicas, most of his own design. He also mixed in sound effects such as jet noise and bird calls, and experimented with tape mixing methods to produce recordings that rank among the most innovative in exotica.... music that is anything but easy listening."

Frank Sinatra championed Diamond, and as a result he signed to Reprise Records when it was established in 1960. Diamond released several albums on the label in 1961 and '62: Exciting Sounds of the South Seas, Themes From The Great Foreign Films, Off Shore, and Harmonica Sounds In Country And Western Music. However, by this time "the popular audience had lost what little interest it had in harmonica music", and the albums were criticized for "boring arrangements... [which] only exaggerated the inappropriateness of the harmonica".

Diamond died in Los Angeles, California, in 1966, aged 51.
