= Forever Yours (1945 film) =

1945 film

- Directed by: William Nigh
- Written by: William Nigh; Neil Rau; George Wallace Sayre
- Produced by: Jeffrey Bernerd
- Starring: Gale Storm; C. Aubrey Smith; Johnny Mack Brown
- Cinematography: Harry Neumann
- Edited by: Richard C. Currier; Ray Curtiss
- Music by: Dimitri Tiomkin
- Production company: Monogram Pictures
- Distributed by: Monogram Pictures
- Release date: January 26, 1945
- Running time: 83 minutes
- Country: United States
- Language: English

Forever Yours is a 1945 American drama film directed by William Nigh and starring Gale Storm, C. Aubrey Smith and Johnny Mack Brown. It was made by Monogram Pictures. Although the studio concentrated on low-budget films, this was one of the company's more prestigious releases of the year.

== Plot ==
A young singer is stricken by paralysis and loses the will to live.

== Cast ==
- Gale Storm as Joan Randall
- C. Aubrey Smith as Grandfather
- Johnny Mack Brown as Maj. Tex O'Connor
- Conrad Nagel as Dr. Randall
- Mary Boland as Aunt Mary
- Frank Craven as Uncle Charles
- Johnny Downs as Ricky
- Catherine McLeod as Martha
- Selmer Jackson as Williams
- Matt Willis as Alabam
- Leo Diamond as Leo Diamond
- The Harmonaires as The Harmonaires

== Bibliography ==
- Michael S. Shull. Hollywood War Films, 1937–1945: An Exhaustive Filmography of American Feature-Length Motion Pictures Relating to World War II. McFarland, 2006.
