= Cotton Tail =

1940 composition by Duke Ellington

"Cotton Tail" is a 1940 composition by Duke Ellington. It is based on the rhythm changes from George Gershwin's "I Got Rhythm". The first Ellington recording (4 May 1940) is notable for the driving tenor saxophone solo by Ben Webster. Originally an instrumental, "Cotton Tail" later had lyrics written for it by Ellington. Later, more lyrics were written, based on the 1940 recording, by Jon Hendricks, and recorded by Lambert, Hendricks and Ross.

The 1941 Soundie gives the title as "Hot Chocolate", with "Cotton Tail" below it in parentheses and smaller letters, but this was likely done by the producer, as that title does not seem to appear anywhere else between the original record's release and this production.

Slide Hampton's arrangement of "Cotton Tail" on Dee Dee Bridgewater's 1997 album Dear Ella won him the Grammy Award for Best Instrumental Arrangement Accompanying Vocalist(s) in 1998.

"Cotton Tail" is the theme song for "The Art of Jazz", a music history radio program hosted by Ken Wiley on KNKX-FM. Wiley plays Ellington's entire version of "Cotton Tail" both at the beginning and at the end of every show.

== Notable recordings ==
- The Duke Ellington Orchestra, May 2, 1940
- Ella Fitzgerald - Ella Fitzgerald Sings the Duke Ellington Songbook (1957)
- The Big Four (George Kawaguchi, Go Ueda, Hachidai Nakamura, Hidehiko Matsumoto) - Jazz at the Torys (1957)
- Harry James - Harry James And His New Swingin' Band (MGM SE-3778, 1959)
- Lambert, Hendricks and Ross - Everybody's Boppin' (August 6, 1959)
- Wes Montgomery - So Much Guitar (1961)
- Ella Fitzgerald and Duke Ellington - Ella at Duke's Place (1965)
- Mel Tormé - Mel Tormé and the Marty Paich Dektette - In Concert Tokyo (1988)
- The Buddy Rich Big Band with Neil Peart - Burning for Buddy: A Tribute to the Music of Buddy Rich (1994)
- Dave Grusin - Homage to Duke (1993)

== See also ==
- List of jazz contrafacts
