= The Glow-Worm =

Song
- Language: German
- Published: 1902 by Apollo-Verlag
- Genre: Operetta
- Songwriters: Paul Lincke and Heinz Bolten-Backers

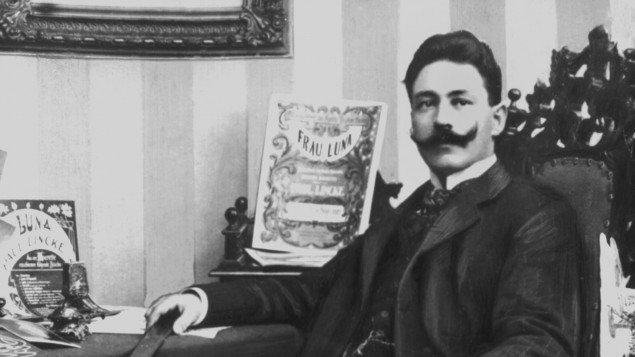
Paul Lincke

"Das Glühwürmchen", known in English as "The Glow-Worm", is a song from Paul Lincke's 1902 operetta Lysistrata, with German lyrics by Heinz Bolten-Backers. In the operetta, it is performed as a trio with three female solo voices singing alternately and the women's chorus joining in the refrain. Rhythmically, it is in the form of a gavotte. The song, with its familiar chorus, was translated into English and became an American popular song.

== History ==
It was originally translated into English by Lilla Cayley Robinson, in the early 20th century, and was used in act 2 of the 1907 Broadway adaptation of the musical The Girl Behind the Counter.

American lyricist Johnny Mercer later expanded and greatly revised Robinson's lyrics, for the 1952 recording by The Mills Brothers. His version was a hit for the Mills Brothers, and it has been performed by several others.

The tune has also been heard as an orchestral instrumental.

== Lyrics ==
Robinson's English-translation lyrics (circa 1905):

When the night falls silently,
The night falls silently on forests dreaming,
Lovers wander forth to see,
They wander forth to see the bright stars gleaming.
And lest they should lose their way,
Lest they should lose their way, the glow-worms nightly
Light their tiny lanterns gay,
Their tiny lanterns gay and twinkle brightly.

Here and there and everywhere, from mossy dell and hollow,
Floating, gliding through the air, they call on us to follow.

Chorus:
Shine, little glow-worm, glimmer, glimmer
Shine, little glow-worm, glimmer, glimmer!
Lead us lest too far we wander.
Love's sweet voice is calling yonder!
Shine, little glow-worm, glimmer, glimmer
Shine, little glow-worm, glimmer, glimmer
Light the path below, above,
And lead us on to love.

Little glow-worm, tell me pray,
Oh glow-worm, tell me, pray, how did you kindle
Lamps that by the break of day,
That by the break of day, must fade and dwindle?"
Ah, this secret, by your leave,
This secret, by your leave, is worth the learning!
When true lovers come at eve,
True lovers come at eve, their hearts are burning!

Glowing cheeks and lips betray how sweet the kisses tasted
Till we steal the fire away, for fear lest it be wasted!"

Johnny Mercer kept the original chorus basically intact and added three new "verses" to that same tune but did not use music from the original song's verses at all.

== Renditions and other appearances in popular culture ==
- Probably the best-known recording of the song was done by The Mills Brothers with the Hal McIntyre Orchestra in 1952. Their version spent 21 weeks on the charts, including 3 weeks at #2.
- Ballerina Anna Pavlova performed an orchestrated version of "The Glow-Worm".
- The Victor Company's Nathaniel Shilkret arranged and recorded an instrumental version titled The Glow-Worm--Idyl with the Victor Salon Orchestra, released as Victor 19758 in 1925.
- Spike Jones released a version of the song in 1946, replete with his typical comic sound effects.
- Allan Sherman parodied the song as "Grow, Mrs. Goldfarb."
- Violet Reiser arranged the song for piano.
- The song was heard multiple times in the season 2 I Love Lucy episode "The Saxophone" (1952), being played by Lucy Ricardo (Lucille Ball) on saxophone.
- The tune was used in pianist George Feyer's RCA Victor album Memories of Viennese Operettas (1958)
- Jean-Jacques Perrey used the song to make "La Gavotte Des Vers Luisants" (1960) for his album, Mister Ondioline.
- In the 1960s, the soft drink Dr Pepper used the tune of the song's chorus in its "It's Dr Pepper Time!" ads.
- In an early sketch by The Muppets, Kermit the Frog (performed by Jim Henson) sits on a wall and hums "Glow-Worm". One by one, small worms crawl up to Kermit, and he eats them - but the third worm turns out to be the long nose of a giant monster, who eats Kermit. This sketch was performed on The Ed Sullivan Show (November 27, 1966), in a 1971 episode of The Dick Cavett Show, and ultimately on The Muppet Show itself.
- The German keyboard player Klaus Wunderlich recorded an electronic version in 1974 using a Moog synthesizer to imitate the sound of glow-worms, frogs, mosquitoes and other animals.
- "The Glow-Worm" was briefly heard playing on a radio in the sixth and final episode of Police Squad, "Testimony of Evil (Dead Men Don't Laugh)" (1982), as Norberg (Peter Lupus) sways along to it, noticeably high on drugs.
- Mel Tormé recorded a version with alternate lyrics for his 1992 Christmas album, Christmas Songs.
- An orchestral arrangement of the song is used in McCain Foods's "Good Unlimited" ads, which first aired in November 2009.
- In Season 8 of Ninjago, the character Cole cannot remember the whole song, and in frustration sings part of the chorus repeatedly
