= The Hilltoppers (band) =

American vocal group

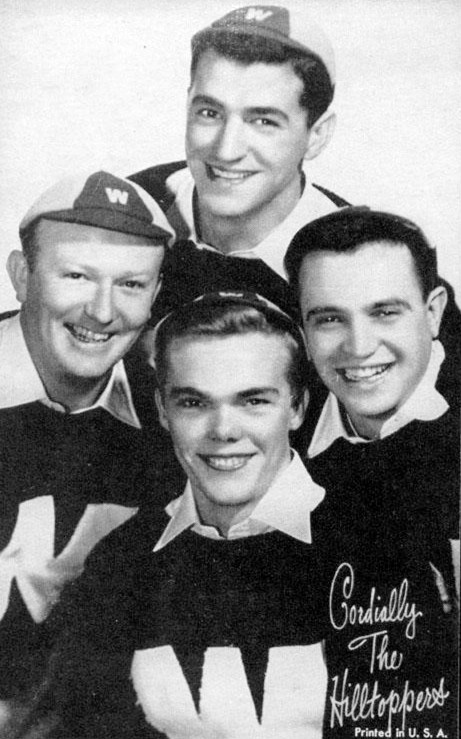
- c. 1954

Background information
- Origin: Bowling Green, Kentucky, U.S.
- Genres: Traditional pop
- Years active: 1952–1963
- Labels: Dot, London
- Past members: Jimmy Sacca; Donald McGuire; Seymour Spiegelman; Billy Vaughn
- Website: The Hilltoppers Page

The Hilltoppers were an American popular music singing group.

== Career ==
Originally the group was a trio formed at Western Kentucky State College (now Western Kentucky University), Bowling Green, Kentucky. The original members were three students; Jimmy Sacca (born July 26, 1929, Lockport, New York, died March 7, 2015, in Lexington, Kentucky); Donald McGuire (born October 7, 1931, Hazard, Kentucky, died September 7, 2018, in Lexington); and Seymour Spiegelman (October 1, 1930 – February 13, 1987). Spiegelman was born in Seneca Falls, New York and died in New York City. They took their name from the nickname of the Western Kentucky athletic teams.

They later added a pianist, Billy Vaughn (April 12, 1919 – September 26, 1991). Vaughn was born in Glasgow, Kentucky. Vaughn was eventually to become famous in his own right as an orchestra leader.

In 1952, they recorded a song, "Trying", written by Vaughn. A local disc jockey sent a copy to Randy Wood at Dot, and he agreed to distribute the record. It became a top 10 hit single. They went on to record a number of additional hits until their break-up. Their 1953 release, "P.S. I Love You," sold over one million copies, and was awarded a gold disc.

Spiegelman died in New York City. Vaughn died in Escondido, California. Both Sacca and McGuire died in Lexington.

== Hit records ==
Year	Title	Chart positions		
Year	Title	US	CB	UK
1952	"Trying"	7	5	—
1953	"Must I Cry Again"	15	22	—
1953	"I Keep Telling Myself"	26	39	—
1953	"If I Were King"	22	26	—
1953	"I'd Rather Die Young (Than Grow Old without You)"	8	12	—
1953	"P.S. I Love You"	4	5	—
1953	"Love Walked In"	8	11	—
1953	"To Be Alone"	8	14	—
1954	"'Till Then"	10	7	—
1954	"Alone" (Sacca, solo)	—	28	—
1954	"From the Vine Came the Grape"	8	3	—
1954	"Time Will Tell"	27	38	—
1954	"Poor Butterfly"	12	14	—
1954	"Wrapped Up In a Dream"	—	37	—
1954	"Sweetheart (Will You Remember"	24	25	—
1954	"If I Didn't Care"	17	18	—
1954	"Time Waits for No One"	25	26	—
1955	"D-A-R-L-I-N'"	—	16	—
1955	"The Door Is Still Open to My Heart"	—	22	—
1955	"The Kentuckian Song"	20	22	—
1955	"Only You (And You Alone)"	8	3	3
1955	"Searching"	81	43	—
1955	"My Treasure"	31	37	—
1956	"Ka-Ding-Dong"	38	17	—
1956	"Tryin'"	—	—	30
1957	"Marianne"	3	2	20
1957	"I Love My Girl"	75	45	—
1957	"I'm Serious"	74	—	—
1957	"A Fallen Star"	58	24	—
1957	"The Joker (That's What They Call Me)"	22	20	—
