= Star Spangled Rhythm =

1942 all-star cast musical film

- Theatrical release poster
- Directed by: Credited director: George Marshall; Co-director: Ralph Murphy "Old Black Magic": A. Edward Sutherland; Contributing: Frank Tuttle; Lewis Allen; Paul Weatherwax (all uncredited)
- Written by: Sketches: Melvin Frank; George S. Kaufman; Norman Panama; Arthur A. Ross; Fred Saidy (uncredited); Arthur Phillips (uncredited); Writer: Harry Tugend
- Produced by: Joseph Sistrom
- Starring: The Stars of Paramount Pictures
- Cinematography: Theodor Sparkuhl; Leo Tover
- Edited by: Paul Weatherwax
- Music by: Score: Robert Emmett Dolan; Songs: Harold Arlen (music); Johnny Mercer (lyrics)
- Distributed by: Paramount Pictures
- Release dates: December 30, 1942 (New York City); February 12, 1943 (US)
- Running time: 99 minutes
- Country: United States
- Language: English
- Budget: $1,127,989
- Box office: $3.85 million (U.S. and Canada rentals)

Star Spangled Rhythm is a 1942 American all-star cast musical film made by Paramount Pictures during World War II as a morale booster. Many of the Hollywood studios produced such films during the war, with the intent of entertaining the troops overseas and civilians back home and to encourage fundraising – as well as to show the studios' patriotism. This film was also the first released by Paramount to be shown for 8 weeks.

Star Spangled Rhythm was directed by George Marshall and others, and written by Harry Tugend with sketches by Melvin Frank, George S. Kaufman and others. The film has music by Robert Emmett Dolan and songs by Harold Arlen and Johnny Mercer, and the cast consisted of most of the stars on the Paramount roster.

== Plot ==
Pop Webster is a former silent movie star once known as "Bronco Billy" who now works as the guard on the main gate at Paramount Pictures. However, he's told his son Johnny, who's in the Navy, that he's the studio's Executive Vice President in Charge of Production. When Johnny shows up in Hollywood on shore leave, Pop and the studio's switchboard operator, Johnny's sweetheart Polly Judson, go all-out to maintain the illusion for Johnny and his sailor friends that Pop's a studio big-wig. Things get a bit complicated when Pop offers to put on a variety show for the Navy, featuring all of Paramount's stars, but Polly convinces Bob Hope and Bing Crosby to do the show, and they convince the rest of the stars on the lot.

== Cast ==
- Victor Moore as William "Pop" Webster
- Betty Hutton as Polly Judson
- Eddie Bracken as Johnny Webster
- Walter Abel as B.G. DeSoto
- Cass Daley as Mimi
- Gil Lamb as High Pockets
- Gladys Blake as Liz
- Cecil B. DeMille as himself
- Preston Sturges as himself
- Edward Fielding as Y. Frank Freemont
- Boyd Davis as Captain Kingsley
- Anne Revere as Sarah (uncredited)
- Paul Newlan as Stage Door Guard (uncredited)
- William Haade as Marine Sergeant (uncredited)

Performers:

- Bob Hope – Master of Ceremonies
- Bing Crosby – "Old Glory" number
- Fred MacMurray – Frank in "If Men Played Cards as Women Do"
- Franchot Tone – John in "If Men Played Cards as Women Do"
- Ray Milland – Joe in "If Men Played Cards as Women Do"
- Lynne Overman – in "If Men Played Cards as Women Do"
- Dorothy Lamour – "Sweater, Sarong & Peekaboo Bang" number
- Paulette Goddard – "Sweater, Sarong & Peekaboo Bang" number
- Veronica Lake – "Sweater, Sarong & Peekaboo Bang" number
- Arthur Treacher – "Sweater, Sarong & Peekaboo Bang" number
- Sterling Holloway – "Sweater, Sarong & Peekaboo Bang" number
- Walter Catlett – "Sweater, Sarong & Peekaboo Bang" number
- Vera Zorina – "That Old Black Magic" number
- Mary Martin – "Hit the Road to Dreamland" number
- Dick Powell – "Hit the Road to Dreamland" number
- Alan Ladd – Scarface skit
- Macdonald Carey – Louie the Lug in Scarface skit
- Marjorie Reynolds – Swing Shift skit
- Susan Hayward – Genevieve in Priorities skit
- Eddie "Rochester" Anderson – "Sharp as a Tack" number
- Katherine Dunham – dancer in "Sharp as a Tack" number
- Chester Clute – Air Raid Warden in Bob Hope skit
- Maxine Ardell – Wife in Bob Hope skit
- William Bendix – Herman the Husband in Bob Hope skit
- Jerry Colonna – Bob Hope skit

Cast notes:

- The character "B.G. Desoto" is modeled after Paramount executive producer Buddy DeSylva, and "Y. Frank Freemont" after vice-president Y. Frank Freeman. When pretending to be "Mr Freemont"'s secretary, Betty Hutton speaks in an affected Southern accent; the real Y. Frank Freeman was a Southerner who was intensely loyal to Dixie.
- Others who appear in the film include Rod Cameron, Eva Gabor, Cecil Kellaway, Matt McHugh, Frank Faylen, Robert Preston and Woody Strode. Strode is seen only very briefly as Eddie Anderson's chauffeur in the "Sharp As a Tack" number.
- Star Spangled Rhythm marked the feature film debut of Bing Crosby's son, Gary Crosby, who was 9 years old at the time.
- Although "Benito Mussolini", "Hirohito" and "Adolf Hitler" are listed as characters in this film, the actors cast in those roles are not actually portraying the dictators themselves; they are merely impersonators showing up for a brief sight gag at the end of the novelty number "A Sweater, a Sarong and a Peekaboo Bang". Tom Dugan, a veteran character actor who appeared as "Adolf Hitler", also played "Bronski", an actor who plays the part of "Adolf Hitler", in Ernst Lubitsch's comedy To Be or Not To Be.

== Songs ==
The songs in Star Spangled Rhythm were written by Harold Arlen (music) and Johnny Mercer (lyrics):

- "Hit the Road to Dreamland" – sung by Mary Martin, Dick Powell and the Golden Gate Quartette
- "I'm Doing It for Defense" – sung by Betty Hutton
- "Old Glory" – sung by Bing Crosby and chorus
- "He Loved Me Till the All-Clear Came"
- "On the Swing Shift" – sung and danced by Marjorie Reynolds, Betty Jane Rhodes and Dona Drake
- "Sharp as a Tack" – sung by Eddie "Rochester" Anderson, Katherine Dunham, Slim Gaillard and Slam Stewart, and Woody Strode
- "A Sweater, Sarong and a Peek-A-Boo Bang" – sung by Paulette Goddard, Dorothy Lamour, and Veronica Lake (dubbed by Martha Mears), and by Arthur Treacher, Walter Catlett and Sterling Holloway, in drag
- "That Old Black Magic" – sung by Johnny Johnston and danced by Vera Zorina

== Production ==
The working title of Star Spangled Rhythm was Thumbs Up. Paramount paid Arthur Ross and Fred Saidy for the rights to two sketches from their musical revue Rally Round the Girls, which were used in the film. The "That Old Black Magic" sequence, which was directed by A. Edward Sutherland, was intended to be directed by René Clair, who was unavailable at the time of shooting.

The film was in production from 11 June to 23 July 1942 at Paramount's studios on Melrose Avenue in Hollywood. Location shooting took place at the Naval Training Center in San Diego, California. The final cost of the film was $1,127,989. The film premiered in New York City on December 30, 1942, and opened nationwide on February 12, 1943.

In 1943, Broncho Billy Anderson (real name:Maxwell Henry Aronson) sued Paramount for using the "Broncho Billy" name without permission. He objected to the "Bronco Billy" character in Star Spangled Rhythm being a "washed-up and broken-down actor", which he felt reflected badly on himself. Aronson asked for $900,000, but the outcome of the lawsuit is unknown.

Veronica Lake and Alan Ladd both appear. They would team in two other all-star films.

== Awards and honors ==
Star Spangled Rhythm received two 1944 Academy Award nominations: Harold Arlen (music) and Johnny Mercer (lyrics) were nominated for "Best Original Song" for "That Old Black Magic", and Robert Emmett Dolan was nominated for "Best Score".

The film is recognized by American Film Institute in these lists:

- 2006: AFI's Greatest Movie Musicals – Nominated

== See also ==
- This Is the Army
- Thousands Cheer
- Stage Door Canteen
- Hollywood Canteen
- Cowboy Canteen
- Thank Your Lucky Stars
- Private Buckaroo
- The Yanks Are Coming
- Reveille with Beverly
