= Melody of Love (song) =

Song by Hans Engelmann

Single by Billy Vaughn

from the album Sweet Music and Memories
- B-side: "Joy Ride"
- Released: December 1954
- Recorded: 1954
- Genre: Instrumental music
- Length: 2:55
- Label: Dot
- Songwriter: Hans Engelmann

Billy Vaughn singles chronology
"Melody of Love" (1954)	"Silver Moon" (1955)

"Melody of Love"

Single by David Carroll
- Released: December 1954
- Recorded: 1954
- Genre: Traditional pop
- Length: 2:30
- Label: Mercury
- Songwriter: Hans Engelmann

David Carroll singles chronology
"In a Little Spanish Town" (1954)	"Melody of Love" (1954)	"Two Timin' Gal" (1955)

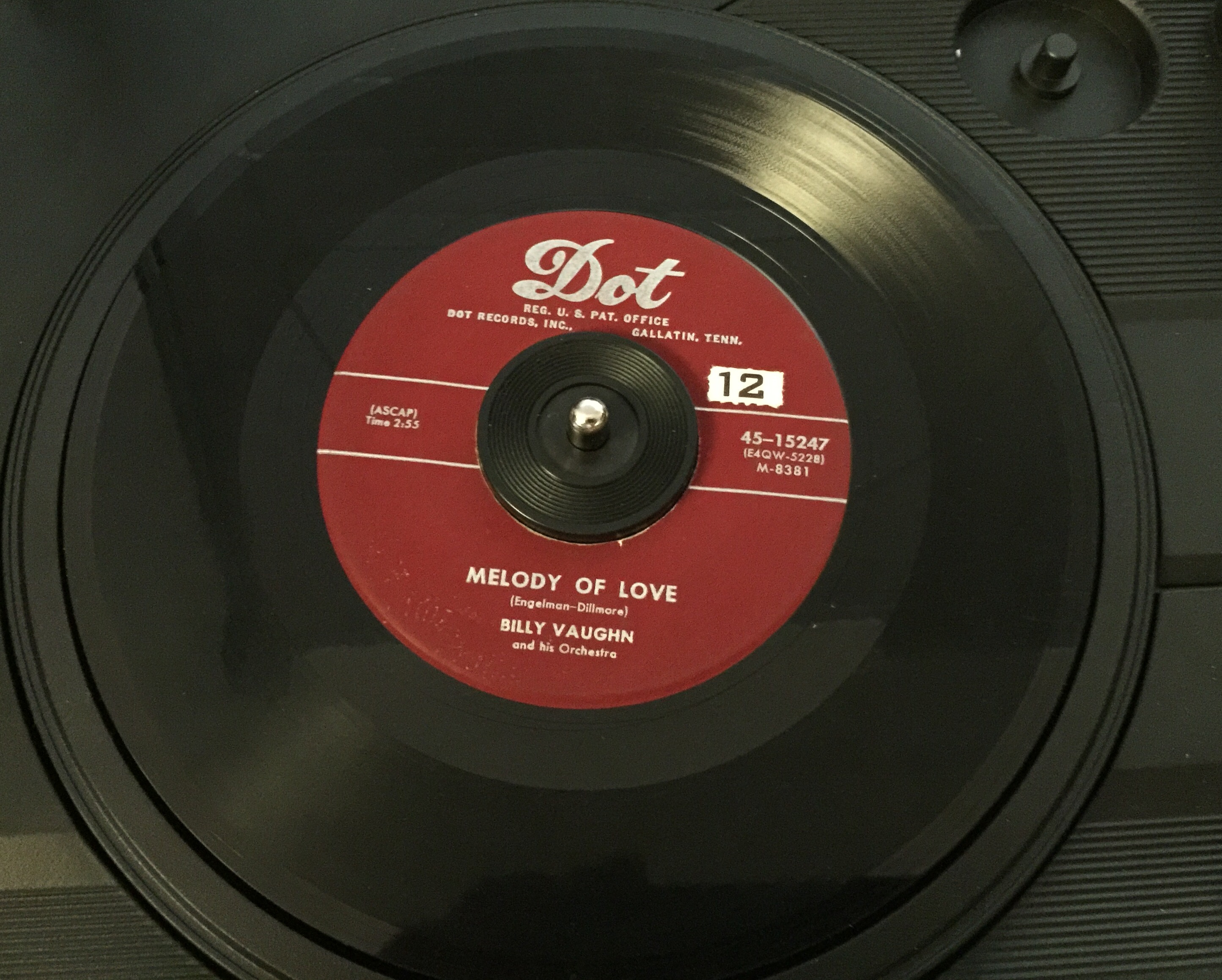
"Melody of Love" instrumental by Billy Vaughn

"Melody of Love" is a popular song. The music was originally written by Hans Engelmann in 1903. The lyrics were added by Tom Glazer in 1954.

== Instrumental ==
Although recorded by Edison Records within a year of its release, the song's breakthrough came in 1955 with an instrumental version recorded by Billy Vaughn. Other charting versions in 1955 were by David Carroll, by The Four Aces, and by Leo Diamond.

The recording by Billy Vaughn was released by Dot Records as catalog number 15247. It first reached the Billboard Best Seller chart on December 1, 1954, and lasted 27 weeks on the chart, peaking at No. 2.

The recording by David Carroll was released by Mercury Records as catalog number 70516. It first reached the Billboard Best Seller chart on December 29, 1954, and lasted 17 weeks on the chart, peaking at No. 9. This was Carroll's only hit on the Billboard best seller chart. Another Carroll version, featuring a narration by Paul Tremaine, was released on Mercury 70521. This version was shown as a best-selling version in Cashbox for most of "Melody Of Love"'s extensive chart run.

The instrumental recording by Leo Diamond was released by RCA Victor Records as catalog number 20-5973. It reached the Billboard Best Seller chart for one week on February 9, 1955, at No. 30. With so many versions, the Cash Box chart, which combined all versions of a song, had a much higher standing for the song than Billboard, and the song was a No. 1 hit for 7 weeks there.

== Version with lyrics by Tom Glazer ==
Tom Glazer supplied lyrics to the song in 1954, which begin: "Hold me in your arms, dear. Dream with me. Cradled by your kisses. Tenderly While a choir of angels. From above. Sings our melody of love."

The recording of Glazer's version by vocal quartet The Four Aces was released by Decca Records as catalog number 29395. It first reached the Billboard Best Seller chart on January 12, 1955, and lasted 17 weeks on the chart, peaking at No. 11.

A solo sung version by Frank Sinatra with band led by Ray Anthony was released.

In the United Kingdom, a version by the Ink Spots was the sole hit version, charting at #10. It was also recorded by the Beverley Sisters and Shirley Wilson.

Jim Reeves posthumously brought the song the country charts as "Why Do I Love You (Melody Of Love)" in late 1969-early 1970.

== Unrelated songs ==
In 1957 a song unrelated, except by title, by The Ames Brothers, "Melodie D'Amour" (Melody Of Love) charted at #5.

== Other recorded versions ==
- Stanley Black
- Pat Boone & Shirley Boone for their album Side by Side (1959).
- Bing Crosby recorded the song in 1955 for use on his radio show and it was subsequently included in the box set The Bing Crosby CBS Radio Recordings (1954-56) issued by Mosaic Records (catalog MD7-245) in 2009.
- The Four Aces
- Connie Francis - for her album Greatest American Waltzes (1963)
- Gatlin Brothers
- Spike Jones
- Pee Wee King & His Golden West Cowboys
- Wayne King
- The Lennon Sisters
- Hank Locklin
- Al Martino - for his album My Cherie (1965).
- The McGuire Sisters
- Moms & Dads
- Patti Page - for her album I've Heard That Song Before (1958).
- Dinah Shore and Tony Martin (1954)
- Frank Sinatra and Ray Anthony (1955)
- Brad Swanson
- Billy Vaughn
- Slim Whitman
- Roger Williams

== See also ==
- My Melody of Love, a pop single by Bobby Vinton.
- Melody of Love (Wanna Be Loved), a pop single by Donna Summer.
