= Steve Gilmore (musician) =

American jazz musician

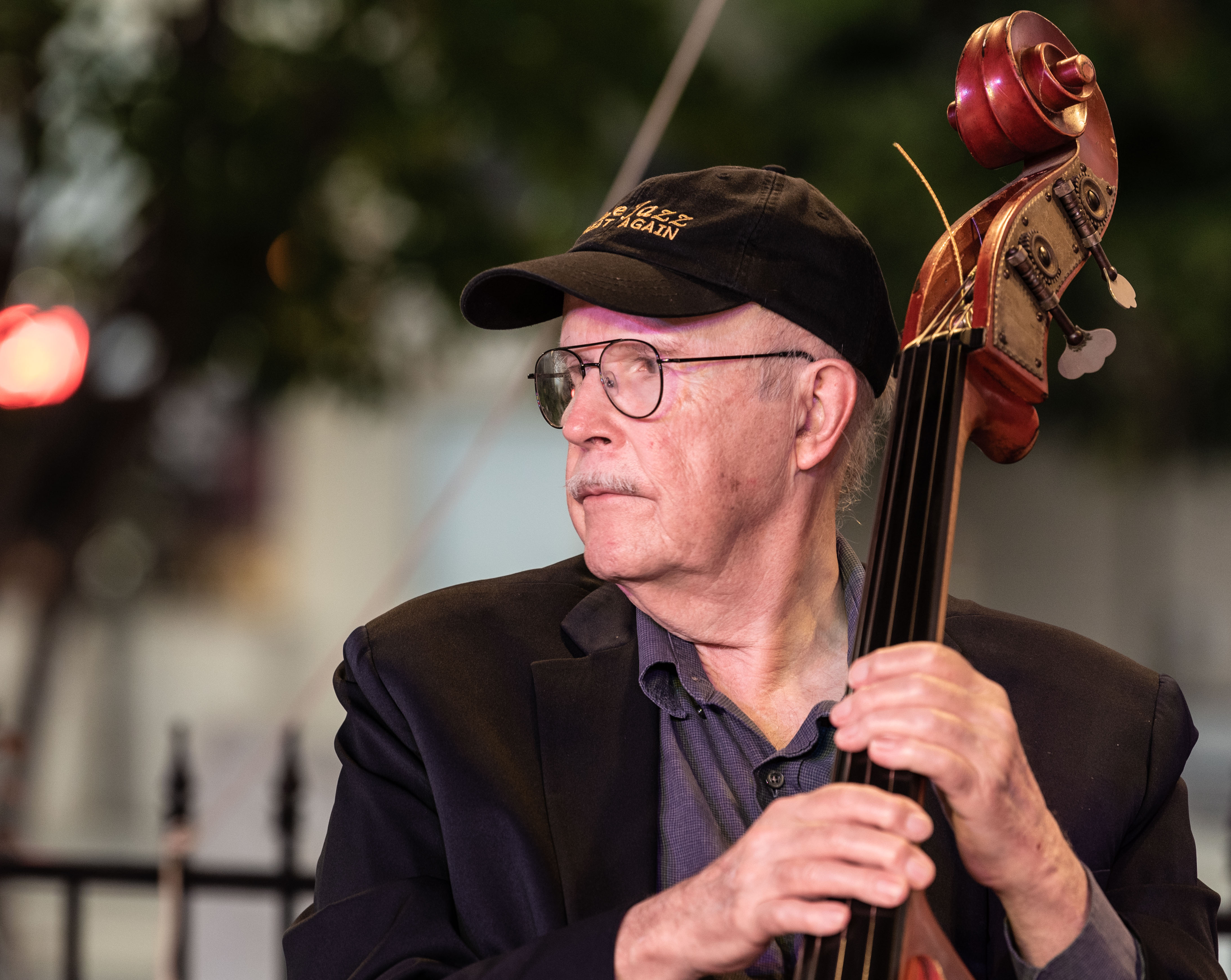
Steve Gilmore performing at the Jazz By The Bay Festival, Panama City, FL, November, 2022.

Steve Gilmore is an American jazz double-bassist. He has played in numerous bands and ensembles including The Phil Woods Quintet, which he joined at its inception in 1974.

== Career ==
He was born Steven Dirk Gilmore on January 21, 1943, in Trenton, New Jersey. He was raised in the Philadelphia area.

Steve picked up bass when he was 12 years old and played locally in Philadelphia as a teenager. At age 17 he enrolled at the Advanced School of Contemporary Music, run by Oscar Peterson, and later in the 1960s played with Ira Sullivan and the Baker's Dozen Big Band. He joined Flip Phillips's group in 1967 and remained with Phillips until 1971, after which he worked with Al Cohn and Zoot Sims, Mose Allison, The Thad Jones / Mel Lewis Orchestra, Phil Woods, Richie Cole, and the National Jazz Ensemble.

In the 1980s he played with John Coates Jr., Meredith D'Ambrosio, Dave Frishberg, Hal Galper, Tom Harrell, and Toshiko Akiyoshi, as well as with Phil Woods. He and Woods would remain collaborators into the 1990s. In 1988 he began working with Dave Liebman, with whom he would work intermittently through the late 1990s. Other associations in the 1990s included Tony Bennett, Carol Sloane, Susannah McCorkle, Bill Charlap, and Jim Hall. In 2000, he played with Lee Konitz in a group including Peter Bernstein, Mark Turner, Bill Goodwin

As Band Leader
Year recorded	Title	Label	Notes
1993	I'm All Smiles	Jazzmania	Steve Brown, Guitar; Chris Persad, trumpet; Brain Lynch, trumpet.
1993	Silhouette	Jazzmania	Steve Gilmore - bass; Ted Rosenthal - piano; Steve Brown - guitar; Jimmy Madison - drums; Brian Lynch - flugelhorn trumpet; Mark Kirk - alto saxophone.
1996	Reflections in the Night	Jazzmania	Steve Gilmore - bass; Bill Charlap - piano.

With Phil Woods
Year recorded	Title	Label	Notes	Grammy (* = Won)
1976	The Phil Woods Six: "Live" from the Showboat	RCA	Phil Woods - alto/soprano saxophone; Steve Gilmore - bass; Bill Goodwin - drums; Harry Leahey - guitar; Alyrio Lima - percussion; Mike Melillo - piano.	Best Live Performance, Soloist; *Best Live Performance, Group
1977	The Phil Woods Quintet: Song for Sysyphus	Century	Phil Woods - alto saxophone; Harry Leahey - guitar; Mike Melillo - piano; Steve Gilmore - bass; Bill Goodwin - drums.	Best Jazz Instrumental Performance, Group
1978	Phil Woods / I Remember	Gryphon	Phil Woods - alto saxophone; Steve Gilmore - bass; Mike Melillo - piano; Bill Goodwin - drums; Kenny Wheeler - trumpet; Gordon Beck - piano; Dave Horler - trombone; and elements of the London Symphony conducted by Harry Rabinowitz M.B.E.	
1978	The Phil Woods Quartet: 'More' Live	Adelphi	Phil Woods - alto saxophone; Mike Melillo - piano; Steve Gilmore - bass; Bill Goodwin - drums.	*Best Jazz Instrumental Performance, Group
1979	The Phil Woods Quartet: Volume One	Clean Cuts	Phil Woods - alto saxophone; Steve Gilmore - bass; Mike Melillo - piano; Bill Goodwin - drums.	Best Jazz Instrumental Performance, Group; Best Jazz Instrumental Performance, Soloist
1981	Phil Woods Quartet: Birds of a Feather	Antilles	Phil Woods - alto saxophone; Hal Galper - piano; Steve Gilmore - bass; Bill Goodwin - drums.	
1982	The Phil Woods Quartet: Live From New York	Palo Alto	Phil Woods - alto saxophone; Hal Galper - piano; Steve Gilmore - bass; Bill Goodwin - drums.	
1982	The Phil Woods Quartet - At the Vanguard	Antilles	Phil Woods - clarinet, alto saxophone; Steve Gilmore - bass; Hal Galper - piano; Bill Goodwin - drums.	*Best Jazz Instrumental Performance, Group; Best Jazz Instrumental Performance, Soloist
1984	Phil Woods & Chris Swansen - Piper at the Gates of Dawn	Sea Breeze	Phil Woods - clarinet, alto saxophone; Hal Galpers - piano; Chris Swansen - synthesizer; Steve Gilmore - bass; Hal Galper - piano; Bill Goodwin - drums, Kim Parker - vocals.	Best Jazz Instrumental Performance, Group
1984	Integrity - The New Phil Quintet Woods Live	Red Records	Phil Woods - clarinet, alto saxophone; Steve Gilmore - bass; Bill Goodwin - drums; Hal Galper - piano; Tom Harrell - trumpet.	
1984	Heaven - Phil Woods Quintet	Blackhawk	Phil Woods - clarinet, alto saxophone; Steve Gilmore - bass; Bill Goodwin - drums; Hal Galper - piano; Tom Harrell - trumpet.	
1986	Gratitude: Phil Woods Quintet	Denon	Phil Woods - clarinet, alto saxophone; Steve Gilmore - bass; Bill Goodwin - drums; Hal Galper - piano; Tom Harrell - trumpet.	
1986	Dizzy Gillespie Meets the Phil Woods Quintet	Timeless	Phil Woods - alto saxophone; Dizzy Gillespie - trumpet; Steve Gilmore - bass; Bill Goodwin - drums; Hal Galper - piano; Tom Harrell - trumpet.	
1987	Bop Stew	Concord Jazz	Phil Woods - clarinet, alto saxophone; Steve Gilmore - bass; Bill Goodwin - drums; Hal Galper - piano; Tom Harrell - trumpet.	
1987	Bouquet	Concord Jazz	Phil Woods - clarinet, alto saxophone; Steve Gilmore - bass; Bill Goodwin - drums; Hal Galper - piano; Tom Harrell - trumpet.	
1988	Evolution: Phil Woods Little Big Band	Concord Jazz	Phil Woods - clarinet, alto saxophone; Steve Gilmore - bass; Bill Goodwin - drums; Hal Galper - piano; Tom Harrell - trumpet; Hal Crook - trombone; Nick Brignola - Baritone; Nelson Hill - tenor saxophone.	
1989	Flash: Phil Woods Quintet + One	Concord Jazz	Phil Woods - clarinet, alto saxophone; Hal Galper - piano; Steve Gilmore - bass; Bill Goodwin - drums; Hal Crook - trombone; Tom Harrell - flugelhorn, trumpet.	
1990	All Bird's Children: Phil Woods Quintet	Concord Jazz	Phil Woods - clarinet, alto saxophone; Steve Gilmore - bass; Bill Goodwin - drums; Hal Galper - piano; Hal Crook - trombone.	Best Jazz Instrumental, Soloist
1990	Real Life: Phil Woods' Little Big Band	Chesky	Phil Woods - clarinet, alto saxophone; Bill Goodwin - drums; Jim McNeely - piano; Steve Gilmore - bass; Hal Crook - trombone; Tom Harrell - trumpet; Nick Brignola - alto/baritone saxophone; Nelson Hill - alto/tenor saxophone.	
1991	Full House: Phil Woods Quintet	Milestones	Phil Woods - clarinet, alto saxophone; Steve Gilmore - bass; Bill Goodwin - drums; Hal Galper - piano; Hal Crook - trombone.	
1993	You and the Night and the Music: Phil Woods Quintet	Venus	Phil Woods - alto saxophone; Steve Gilmore - bass; Bill Goodwin - drums; Hal Galper - piano; Hal Crook - trombone.	
1994 / 1997 (Recorded / Released1994)	Souvenirs: Phil Woods Quintet	Venus	Phil Woods - clarinet, alto saxophone; Steve Gilmore - bass; Bill Goodwin - drums; Hal Galper - piano; Hal Crook - trombone.	
1995	Phil Woods Plays the Music of Jim McNeely	TCB	Phil Woods - alto saxophone; Steve Gilmore - bass; Bill Goodwin - drums; Jim McNeely- piano; Brian Lynch - trumpet.	
1996	Mile High Jazz: The Phil Woods Quintet - Live in Denver	Concord	Phil Woods - alto saxophone; Brian Lynch - trumpet; Bill Charlap - piano; Steve Gilmore - bass; Bill Goodwin - drums.	
1997	Chasin' the Bird: Phil Woods	Venus	Phil Woods - alto saxophone; Brian Lynch - trumpet; Bill Charlap - piano; Steve Gilmore - bass; Bill Goodwin - drums.	
1997	Phil Woods & the Festival Orchestra - Celebration	Concord	Phil Woods - alto saxophone; Nelson Hill - alto saxophone, flute; George Young - soprano saxophone, flute; Jim Buckley - baritone saxophone, bass clarinet; Steve Gilmore - bass; Jim Daniels - bass trombone; Bill Goodwin - drums; Bill Charlap - piano; Lew Delgado - tenor saxophone, clarinet; Tom Hamilton - tenor saxophone, clarinet; Hal Crook - trombone; Keith O'Quinn - trombone; Rick Chamberlain - trombone; Brian Lynch - trumpet; Jan Betz - trumpet; Pat Dorian - trumpet; Ken Brader - trumpet.	Best Large Jazz Ensemble Performance
2000	Lee Konitz: Parallels	Chesky Records	Lee Konitz - alto saxophone; Peter Bernstein - guitar; Mark Turner - tenor saxophone; Steve Gimore - bass; Bill Goodwin - drums.	
2002	The Thrill is Gone: Phil Woods with Strings	Venus	Phil Woods - alto saxophone; Brian Lynch - trumpet; Bill Charlap - piano; Steve Gilmore - bass; Bill Goodwin - drums.	
2004	This is How I Feel About Quincy: Phil Woods	Jazz Media	Phil Woods - clarinet, alto saxophone; Brian Lynch - trumpet; Bill Charlap - piano; Steve Gilmore - bass; Bill Goodwin - drums.	
2007	American Songbook 2: The Phil Woods Quintet	Kind of Blue	Phil Woods - clarinet, alto saxophone; Brian Lynch - trumpet; Bill Charlap - piano; Steve Gilmore - bass; Bill Goodwin - drums.	
2007	Phil Woods: The Children's Suite	Jazzed Media	Phil Woods - alto saxophone; Vicki Doney & Bob Dorough - vocals; Tom Hamilton - Tenor saxophone & clarinet; Roger Rosenberg - baritone & bass clarinets; Nelson Hill - alto saxophone & flute; Rick Chamberlain - trombone; Steve Gilmore - bass; Bill Goodwin - drums; Eric Doney - piano.	
2008	Ballads and Blues: Phil Woods Quintet	Venus	Phil Woods - alto saxophone; Brian Lynch - trumpet; Bill Charlap - piano; Steve Gilmore - bass; Bill Goodwin - drums.	
2014	Live at the Deerhead Inn: Phil Woods Quintet	Deerhead Records	Phil Woods - alto saxophone; Brian Lynch - trumpet; Bill Charlap - piano; Steve Gilmore - bass; Bill Goodwin - drums.	

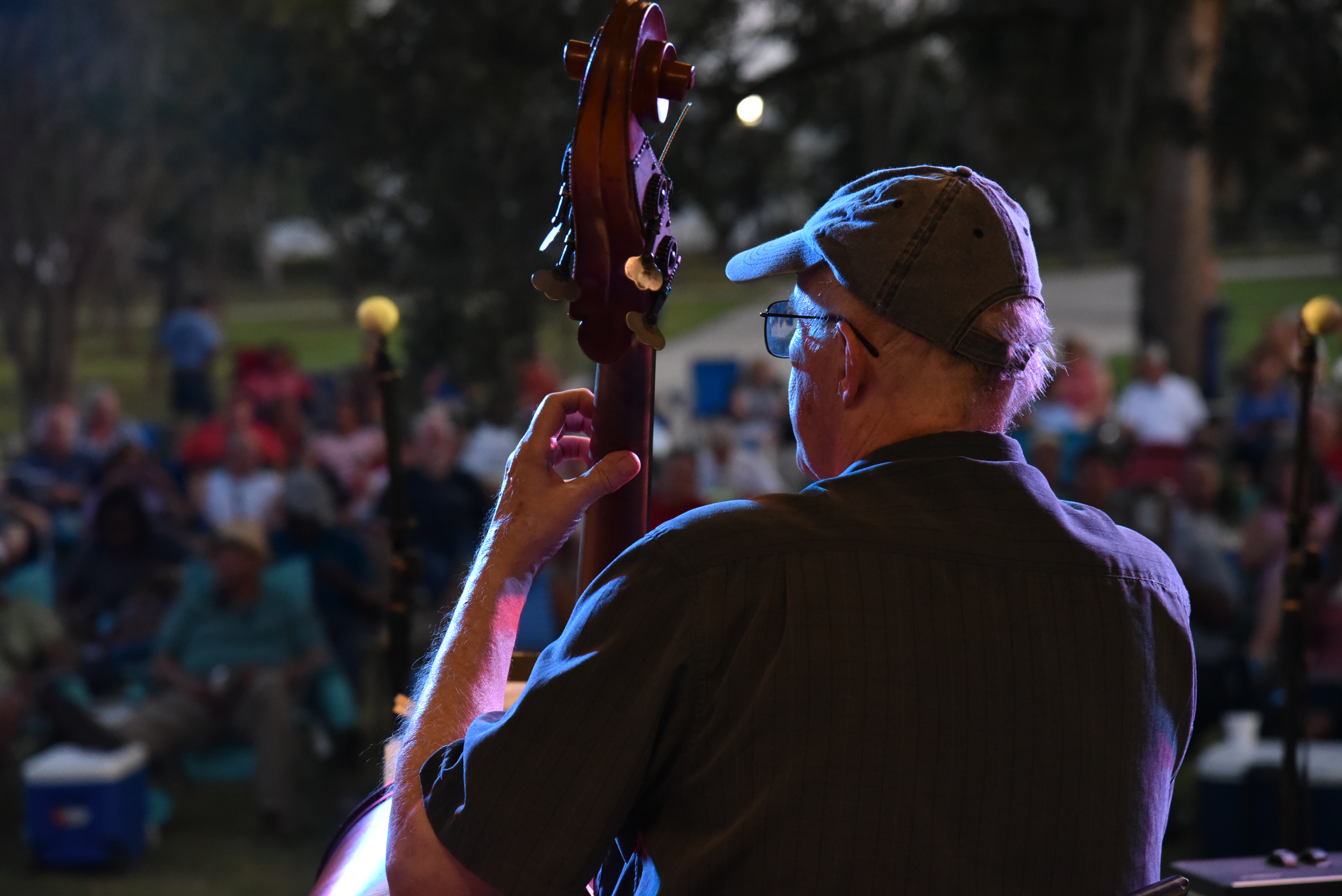
Photo - Mark Fischer / Gulf Jazz Society concert, October 4th, 2019, Oaks by the Bay Park, Panama City, FL.

With Thad Jones & Mel Lewis
Year recorded	Title	Label	Notes
1975	Thad Jones & Mel Lewis Orchestra: Suite for Pops	Horizon / A&M	Jon Faddis, Steve Furtado, Jim Bossy, Lew Soloff, Smoky Young, Marvin Stamm, Virgil Jones, Cecil Bridgewater - trumpet; Jimmy Knepper, Quentin "Butter" Jackson, Billy Campbell, Eddie Bert, Janice Robinson, Earl McEntyre - trombone; Cliff Heather, Jack Jeffers, Dave Taylor - bass trombone; George Mraz, Richard Davis, Steve Gilmore - bass; Jack Jeffers - tuba; Jim Buffington, Peter Gordon, Earl Chapin Julius Watkins, Ray Alonge - French horn; Jerry Dodgion, Eddie Xiques - alto saxophone; Jerry Dodgion - soprano saxophone; Billy Harper, Eddie Daniels, Ron Bridgewater, Frank Foster, Greg Herbert, Lou Marini - tenor saxophone; Pepper Adams - baritone saxophone; Jerry Dodgion, Eddie Xiques, Billy Harper, Eddie Daniels, Ron Bridgewater - flute; Eddie Daniels, Pepper Adams, Frank Foster, Ron Bridgewater - clarinet; Eddie Xiques - bass clarinet; Roland Hanna - electric piano; Jon Faddis, Thad Jones Mel Lewis - percussion; Leonard Gibbs - congas; Dee Dee Bridgewater - vocals.
1976	Thad Jones & Mel Lewis Orchestra: New Life	Horizon / A&M	Grammy Nominated - Best Instrumental Jazz Performance, Big Band. Tracks 4 & 5.

With Dave Liebman
Year recorded	Title	Label	Notes
1988	Dave Liebman Plays the Music of Cole Porter	Red Records	Dave Liebman - soprano saxophone; Steve Gilmore - bass; Bill Goodwin - drums.
1991	Classic Ballads: Dave Liebman	Candid Records	Dave Liebman - saxophone; Steve Gilmore - bass; Vic Juris - guitar.
2005	Neighbors: Dave Liebman and Nancy Reed	Vector Disc	Dave Leibman - soprano saxophone; Nancy Reed - vocals; Phil Markowitz - piano; Steve Gilmore - bass; Bill Godwin - drums.

With Al Cohn
Year recorded	Title	Label	Notes
1979	Al Cohn: No Problem	Xanadu	Al Cohn - tenor saxophone; Barry Harris - piano; Steve Gilmore - bass; Walter Bolden - drums.
1986	In Concert at East Stroudsburg University	IAJRC	Al Cohn - tenor saxophone; Harry Leahey - guitar; Steve Gilmore - bass; Bill Goodwin - drums.

With Ritchie Cole
Year recorded	Title	Label	Notes
1975	Trenton Makes the World Takes	Progressive	Ritchie Cole -alto saxophone; Gerald Price - piano; Steve Gilmore - bass; Al Jackson - drums.
1977	Alto Madness	Muse	Ritchie Cole -alto saxophone; Harold Maburn - piano; Vic Juris - guitar; Steve Gilmore - Bass; Eddie Jefferson - vocals.

With Dave Frishberg
Year recorded	Title	Label	Notes
1981	The Dave Frisherg Songbook Volume No. 1	Omnisound	Dave Frishberg - piano, vocals; Steve Gilmore - bass; Bill Goodwin - drums.
1982	The Dave Frisherg Songbook Volume No. 2	Omnisound	Dave Frishberg - piano, vocals; Steve Gilmore - bass; Bill Goodwin - drums.

With Steve Brown
Year recorded	Title	Label	Notes
1983	Steve Brown - "Good Lines"	Cafe Records	Steve Brown - guitar; Bill Dobbins - piano; Steve Gilmore - bass; Bill Goodwin - drums.
1987	Child's Play - Steve Brown & Friends	Cafe Records	Steve Brown - guitar; Bill Dobbins - piano; Steve Gilmore - bass; Bill Goodwin - drums.

With Bob Dorough
Year recorded	Title	Label	Notes
1999	Bob Dorough - Too Much Coffee Man	Blue Note	Bob Dorough - piano, vocals; Steve Gilmore - bass; Bill Goodwin - drums; Ken Brader - trumpet; Richard Chamberlain - trombone; Joe Cohn - guitar; Hui Cox - guitar; Jim Daniels - bass trombone; Ray Drummond - bass; Jamey Haddad - drums; Billy Hart - drums; Mark Holen - percussion; Craig Kastenlnik - organ; Tony Marino - bass, stick bass; Phil Woods - alto saxophone.
2004	Sunday at Iridium	Arbors Jazz	Bob Dorough - piano, vocals; Steve Berger - guitar; Steve Gilmore - bass; Ed Ornowski - drums; Joe Wilder - trumpet Daryl Sherman - piano, vocals; Laura Amico & Roslyn Hart - vocals.

With Stephanie Nakasian
Year recorded	Title	Label	Notes
1992	Bitter Sweet	Jazzmania	Stephanie Nakasian - vocals; Steve Gilmore - bass; Bill Goodwin - drums; Vic Juris - guitar.
2002	Lullaby In Rhythm: A Tribute to June Christy	VSOP	Stephanie Nakasian - vocals; Harry Allen - tenor saxophone; Hod O'brien - piano; Steve Gilmore - bass; John Jensen - trombone; Larry Eanet - piano; Chuck Riggs - drums.
2004	Stephanie Nakasian "Thrush Hour" A Study of the Great Ladies of Jazz	VSOP	Stephanie Nakasian - vocals; Hod O'brien - piano; Randy Sandke - trumpet; Tom Hamilton - tenor saxophone; John Jensen - trombone; Howie Collins - guitar; Steve Gilmore - bass; Bill Goodwin - drums.

With Susannah McCorkle
Year recorded	Title	Label	Notes
1995	Easy to Love - The Songs of Cole Porter	Concord	Susannah McCorkle - vocals; Allen Farnham - piano; Randy Sandke - trumpet; Steve Gilmore - bass; Chris Potter - alto saxophone; Robert Trowers - trombone; Ken Peplowski - tenor saxophone, clarinet; Howard Alden - guitar.
1996	Let's Face the Music - The Songs of Irving Berlin	Concord	Susannah McCorkle - vocals; Jerry Dodgion - alto saxophone, flute; Steve Gilmore - bass; Rich DeRosa - drums; Al Gafa - guitar; Allen Farnham - piano, synthesizer; Chris Potter - tenor saxophone, clarinet, flute; Conrad Herwig - trombone; Gregory Gisbert - trumpet, flugelhorn.
1997	Someone to Watch Over Me - The Songs of George Gershwin	Concord	Susannah McCorkle - vocals; Chris Potter - tenor saxophone, alto flute; Steve Gilmore - bass (guest); Rich DeRosa - drums; Allen Farnham - piano, synthesizer; Conrad Herwig - trombone; Randy Sandke - trumpet, flugelhorn; Howard Alden - guitar; Dick Sarpola - bass.
1998	Susannah McCorkle: From Broken Hearts to Blue Skies	Concord	Susannah McCorkle - vocals; Allen Farnham - piano; John Fedchock - trombone; Alexander Gafa - guitar; Steve Gilmore - bass; Greg Gisbert - flugelhorn, trumpet; John Gordon - flute, alto saxophone, Dick Oatts - Alto Flute, soprano & tenor saxophones.
2000	Hearts and Minds	Concord	Susannah McCorkle - vocals; Allen Farnham - piano; Paul Meyers - guitar; Dick Oatts - tenor sax; Steve Gilmore - bass; Thiago Di Mello - percussion; Vanderlei Pereira drums.

With Jimmy Amadie
Year recorded	Title	Label	Notes
1997 - 2002	In a Trio Setting: A Salute to Sinatra	TP Recordings	Jimmy Amadie - piano; Steve Gilmore - bass; Bill Goodwin - drums.
2004 - 2005	Let's Groove	TP Recordings	Jimmy Amadie - piano; Steve Gilmore - bass; Bill Goodwin - drums; Phil Woods - alto saxophone.
2006 - 2007	The Philadelphia Story	TP Recordings	Jimmy Amadie - piano; Steve Gilmore - bass; Bill Goodwin - drums; Randy Brecker - flugelhorn, trumpet; Benny Golson - tenor saxophone; Lew Tabackin - flute tenor saxophone.
2007	Live at Red Rock Studio: A Tribute to Tony Bennett	TP Recordings	Jimmy Amadie - piano; Steve Gilmore - bass; Bill Goodwin - drums; Phil Woods (guest) - alto saxophone.
2010	Kindred Spirits	TP Recordings	Jimmy Amadie - piano; Steve Gilmore - bass; Bill Goodwin - drums; Joe Lavan - saxophone; Lee Konitz - alto saxophone; Lee Tabackin - tenor saxophone.

With Eddie Higgins Quartet featuring Scott Hamilton
Year recorded	Title	Label	Notes
2001	Smoke Gets in Your Eyes: Eddie Higgins Quartet featuring Scott Hamilton	Venus	Eddie Higgins - piano; Steve Gilmore - bass; Bill Goodwin - drums; Scott Hamilton - tenor saxophone.
2002	My Foolish Heart: Eddie Higgins Quartet featuring Scott Hamilton	Venus	Eddie Higgins - piano; Steve Gilmore - bass; Bill Goodwin - drums; Scott Hamilton - tenor saxophone.

With Various Other Artists
Year recorded	Title	Label	Notes
2001	Lee Konitz: Parallels	Chesky	Lee Konitz - alto saxophone; Steve Gilmore - bass; Bill Goodwin - drums; Peter Bernstein - guitar; Mark Turner - tenor saxophone.
2009	Bob Lark: Live at the Jazz Showcase		Bob Lark - flugelhorn; Phil Woods - alto saxophone; Jim McNeely - piano; Steve Gilmore - bass; Bill Goodwin - drums.
1994	Carol Sloane: When I Look Into Your Eyes	Concord	Carol Sloane - vocals; Howard Alden - guitar; Bill Charlap - piano; Steve Gilmore - bass; Ron Vincent - drums.
1993	Playin' in the Yard: The Bob Kindred Quartet	JazzMania	Bob Kindred - tenor saxophone; Gene Bertoncini - guitar; Steve Gilmore - bass; John Kaye - drums.
1993	Lavender Mist: The Mark Kirk Jazz Quartet	JazzMania	Mark Kirk - alto & soprano saxophones; Kenny Barron - piano; Steve Gilmore - bass; Keith Copeland - drums.
1986	Putte Whitman & the Hal Galper Trio: Miss Oidipus	Dragon	Putte Wickman - clarinet; Hal Galper - piano; Steve Gilmore - bass; Bill Goodwin - drums.
1992	The Dick Whittington Trio: with Steve Gilmore and Bill Goodman in New York	Concord	Dick Whittington - piano; Steve Gilmore - bass; Bill Goodwin. - drums.
1990	Little Jazz Bird: Meredith D'Ambrosio	Sunnyside	Meredith D'Ambrosio - piano, vocals; Julian Daber - viola; Frederick Buldrini - violin; Steve Gilmore - bass, Bill Goodwin - drums; Hank Jones piano; Gene Orloff - violin; Phil Woods - clarinet, alto saxophone.
1982	Harry Leahey: Silver Threads	Omni Sound Jazz	Harry Leahey - guitar; Steve Gilmore - bass.
1980	Chuck Marohnic Quartet: Copenhagen Suite	Steeple Chase	Chuck Marohnic - piano; Steve Gilmore - bass; Bill Goodwin - drums; Bennie Wallace - tenor saxophone.
1980	Harumi Kaneko: I Love New York	Philips	Harumi Kaneko - vocals; Ron Carter - bass; Steve Gilmore - bass; Bill Goodwin - drums; Grady Tate - drums; Harry Leahey - guitar; Armen Halburian - percussion; Hank Jones - piano; Bob Dorough - vocals; George Young - alto & tenor saxophones.
1981	Bill Goodwin: Solar Energy	Omni Sound Jazz	Bill Goodwin - drums; Steve Gilmore - bass; John Scofield - guitar; Steve Swallow - bass; Bill Dobbins - piano.
1986	Tom Harrell Quintet: Open Air	SteepleChase	Tom Harrell - trumpet; Steve Gilmore - bass; Bill Goodwin - drums; Hal Galper - piano; Bob Rockwell - saxophone.
1987	Hal Galper: Dreamsville	Enja	Hal Galpers - piano; Steve Gilmore - bass; Bill Goodwin- drums.
1993	Hod O'Brien: Hod and Cole	Enja	Hod O'Brien - piano; Steve Gilmore - bass; Bill Goodwin- drums.
2003	Mike Melvoin: It's Always You	City Light	Michael Melvoin - piano; Phil Woods - clarinet, alto saxophone; Steve Gilmore - bass; Bill Goodwin - drums.
2004	Gerry Niewood: Facets	Native Language	Gerry Niewood - flute, alto flute, alto, tenor & baritone saxophones; Gene Bertoncini - guitar; Steve Gilmore - bass; Bill Goodwin - drums.
2003	David Basse: Like Jazz featuring Phil Woods	City Light	David Basse - Vocals; Michael Melvoin - piano; Phil Woods - clarinet, alto saxophone; Steve Gilmore - bass; Bill Goodwin - drums.
1976	Chuck Israels: National Jazz Ensemble Vol. 2	Chiaroscuro Records	Jimmy Maxwell, Mike Lawrence, Tom Harrell, David Berger - trumpet; Jimmy Knepper, Rod Levitt, Gerry Chamberlain - trombone; Arnie Lawrence, Lawrence Feldman, Joe Romano, Dennis Anderson, Ken Berger - saxophone; Steve Brown - guitar; Ben Aronov - piano; Steve Gilmore - bass; Bill Goodwin - drums; Margot Hanson vocals.
