= Billy Vaughn =

American musician (1919–1991)

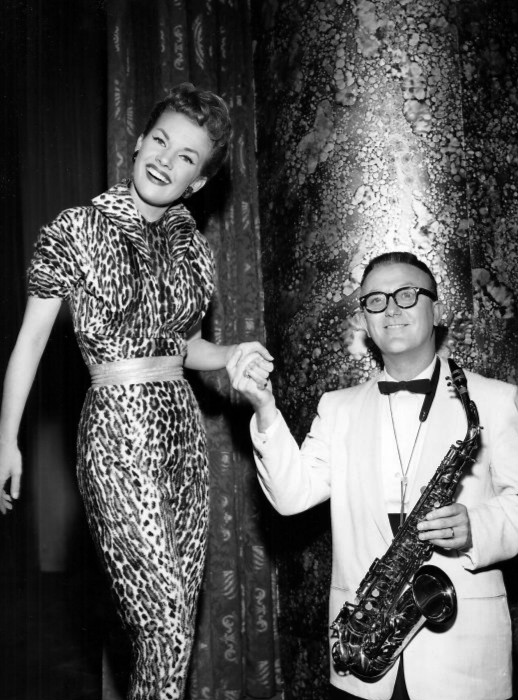
- Vaughn with Gale Storm on The Gale Storm Show in 1958. He and Storm collaborated to write a song, "You're My Baby Doll", which they performed on the show.
- Born: April 12, 1919; Glasgow, Kentucky, U.S.
- Died: September 26, 1991 (aged 72); Escondido, California, U.S.
- Occupations: Multi-instrumentalist, orchestra leader, record executive, singer
- Musical career
- Years active: 1952–1972
- Labels: Dot, London

William Vaughn, popularly known as Billy Vaughn (born Richard Smith Vaughn, April 12, 1919 – September 26, 1991) was an American musician, singer, multi-instrumentalist, orchestra leader, and A&R man for Dot Records.

== Biography ==
Vaughn was born in Glasgow, Kentucky, United States, where his father, Alvis Radford Vaughn, was a barber who loved music and inspired Vaughn to teach himself to play the mandolin at the age of three, while suffering from measles. He went on to learn a number of other instruments, including guitar and alto saxophone, his primary instruments.

In 1941, Vaughn joined the United States National Guard for what had been planned as a one-year assignment, but when World War II broke out, he was in for the duration as a valued musician and composer at Camp Shelby, Mississippi. Major General Daniel I. Sultan decided that Vaughn was too valuable to the base's Thirty-Eighth Division big band, and kept him at Camp Shelby for the duration of the war. He decided to make music a career when he was discharged from the army at the end of the war, and on the GI Bill, attended Western Kentucky State College, now known as Western Kentucky University, majoring in music composition. He had apparently learned to barber from his father, because he did some while studying at Western Kentucky to support himself financially, when he was not able to get jobs playing the piano at local night clubs and lounges. While he was a student there, three other students, Jimmy Sacca, Donald McGuire, and Seymour Spiegelman, who had formed a vocal trio, the Hilltoppers, recruited Vaughn to play the piano with them. He soon added his voice to theirs, converting the trio to a quartet. As a member of the group, he also wrote their first hit song, "Trying", which charted in 1952.

In 1954, he left the group to join Dot Records in Gallatin, Tennessee, as music director. He subsequently formed his own orchestra which had a hit single in that same year with "Melody of Love." It sold over one million copies, and was awarded a gold disc. He went on to have many more hits over the next decade and a half and was the most commercially successful orchestra leader of the rock era.

Vaughn charted a total of 42 singles on the Billboard charts, often based on the sound of two alto saxophones and guitar as his 'trademark'. Vaughn was the bandleader, and he played the lead guitar on most of his songs. He also charted thirty six albums on the Billboard 200, beginning with 1958's Sail Along Silv'ry Moon and ending with 1970's Winter World of Love. He also had nineteen Top 40 hits in (Germany), beginning with the chart-topping "Sail Along, Silv'ry Moon", also a gold record, which was a cover of a 1937 Bing Crosby hit. He had two more number ones in Germany: "La Paloma" and "Wheels" (all three were reportedly million sellers). Vaughn's recording of "Wheels" was no. 1 for 14 weeks in Germany (Hit Bilanz) as well as no. 1 in India, New Zealand, and Italy. Vaughn also charted in Australia, Latin America, and Japan. "Pearly Shells" was a major success in Japan. Vaughn's tours of that country began about the time "Pearly Shells" was a hit in 1965. Many songs which were not US hits or even singles releases there were major hits in other countries. These included "Lili Marlene", "Zwei Gitarren am Meer", "Blueberry Hill" (Germany), and "Greenfields". Also successful were "Song of Peace", "It's a Lonesome Old Town" (Japan), "Michelle" (no 1 in Argentina and Malaysia), "Mexico" (no. 1 in the Philippines), and "Bonanza" (a major success in Brazil and Italy) plus "Theme from the Dark at the Top of the Stairs" (various Latin American countries). The album La Paloma was a success throughout Latin America. He also had a number one album in Germany in the early 1980s with Moonlight Melodies, which consisted of 20 of Billy's biggest hits (original Dot recordings, original LP notes and credits). In addition, Dot Records released a compilation recording of tangos, rumbas and easy listening music featuring both the Billy Vaughn Orchestra and the John Serry Orchestra in Japan. ("Ballroom in Dreamland", DOT 5006)

The Billy Vaughn Orchestra began touring in 1965 with numerous sell-out tours throughout Japan, Brazil, and South Korea.

In the late 1960s and early 1970s, Vaughn lived in Palm Springs, California. He died of peritoneal mesothelioma at Palomar Hospital in Escondido, California, on September 26, 1991, aged 72. He and his wife Marion are buried at the Oak Hill Memorial Park in North Hollywood.

The Billy Vaughn Orchestra, co-owned and managed by his son, Richard Smith Vaughn Jr., is still a touring big band. Produced by the Tate Corporation, Japan, it toured Japan in 2013, 2014, and again in 2018 to sell-out audiences.

== Discography ==
=== Albums ===
Dot Records through 1970.

Year	Title	Chart positions
Year	Title	US
1952	Melodies in Gold	—
1952	Billy Vaughn Plays the Million Sellers	—
1952	La Paloma	—
1959	Golden Saxophones	—
1959	Billy Vaughn Plays	20
1959	Blue Hawaii	7
1959	Big 100	—
1959	Billy Vaughn Plays Stephen Foster	—
1960	Linger Awhile	—
1960	Billy Vaughn Plays The Million Sellers	15
1960	Golden Saxophones	36
1960	Look for a Star	5
1960	Sail Along, Silv'ry Moon	5
1960	Theme from A Summer Place	1
1961	Golden Waltzes	17
1961	Orange Blossom Special and Wheels	11
1961	Theme from The Sundowners	5
1962	A Swingin' Safari	10
1962	The Shifting Whispering Sands	—
1962	Berlin Melody	20
1962	Chapel by the Sea	14
1962	Christmas Carols	145
1962	Greatest String Band Hits	18
1963	1962's Greatest Hits	17
1963	Number 1 Hits, Vol. #1	94
1963	Sukiyaki and 11 Hawaiian Hits	15
1964	Another Hit Album!	141
1964	Blue Velvet & 1963's Great Hits	51
1964	Forever	144
1965	Mexican Pearls	45
1965	Moon Over Naples	31
1965	Pearly Shells	18
1965	Great Country Hits	149
1965	Michelle	56
1967	Body & Soul	—
1967	Alfie	44
1967	Golden Hits/The Best Of Billy Vaughn	159
1967	I Love You	161
1967	Josephine	147
1967	Ode To Billy Joe	200
1967	Sweet Maria	114
1967	That's Life & Pineapple Market	130
1968	Alone With Today	—
1968	Have Yourself A Merry, Merry Christmas	—
1968	A Current Set Of Standards	198
1969	The Windmills Of Your Mind	95
1970	Winter World Of Love	188
1975	Solitaire (JVC)	—
1991	Plays the Music You Remember (Pair Records)	—
2006	Live in Tokyo on May 28, 1972 (Paramount Records)	—

=== Singles ===
Year	Titles (A-side, B-side) Both sides from same album except where indicated	Chart positions				Album
Year	Titles (A-side, B-side) Both sides from same album except where indicated	US	CB	US AC	UK	Album
1954	"Melody of Love" b/w "Joy Ride"	2	1	—	—	Sweet Music and Memories
1955	"Silver Moon" b/w "Baby O'Mine"	—	24	—	—	Sweet Music and Memories
1955	"The Waltz You Saved for Me" b/w "Billy Vaughn's Boogie"	—	50	—	—	Sweet Music and Memories
1955	"The Shifting, Whispering Sands" (Part 1) b/w "The Shifting Whispering Sands" (Part 2)	5	5	—	20	The Shifting Whispering Sands
1955	"I'd Give a Million Tomorrows (For Just One Yesterday)" b/w "Calico Cathy	—	—	—	—	Non-album tracks
1956	"Moritat (Mack the Knife)" / (Note: "Mack the Knife" and "Theme From The Threepenny Opera" are essentially the same song. The difference is that "Mack" was released in the US while "Theme ..." was a UK only release. See Mack the Knife for further information on the evolution of this song.)	37	—	—	—	Theme From "A Summer Place"
1956	"Little Boy Blue"	76	—	—	—	Non-album track
1956	"Theme from the Threepenny Opera" b/w "I'd Give a Million Tomorrows (For Just One Yesterday)" (non-album track)	—	—	—	12	Theme From "A Summer Place"
1956	"Sleep" b/w "Till I Waltz Again with You"	—	—	—	—	Non-album tracks
1956	"Autumn Concerto" b/w "Angel, Angel"	—	—	—	—	Non-album tracks
1956	"The Left Bank (C'est à Hambourg)" b/w "The Sweeetheart Polka"	—	—	—	—	Non-album tracks
1956	"When the White Lilacs Bloom Again" b/w "Spanish Diary"	18	16	—	—	Non-album tracks
1956	"Petticoats of Portugal" b/w "La La Colette"	83	—	—	—	Non-album tracks
1956	"Sweet Leilani" b/w "Creole Love Call"	—	—	—	—	Blue Hawaii
1956	"Sugar Blues" b/w "Pennsylvania Waltz"	—	—	—	—	Non-album tracks
1957	"Ship That Never Sailed" b/w "Song of the Nairobi Trio"	95	41	—	—	Non-album tracks
1957	"Tell My Love" b/w "Ve'Borriquito"	—	—	—	—	Non-album tracks
1957	"Johnny Tremain" b/w "Naughty Annetta" (from Sweet Memories and Music)	—	—	—	—	Non-album tracks
1957	"Raunchy" /	10	25	—	—	Sail Along Silv'ry Moon
1957	"Sail Along, Silv'ry Moon"	5	4	—	—	Sail Along Silv'ry Moon
1958	"Tumbling Tumbleweeds" /	30	30	—	—	Sail Along Silv'ry Moon
1958	"Trying"	77	—	—	—	Non-album tracks
1958	"Singing Hills" b/w "Chimes of Arcady"	56	60	—	—	Non-album tracks
1958	"La Paloma" b/w "Here Is My Love" (non-album track)	20	27	—	—	La Paloma
1958	"Cimarron" b/w "You're My Baby Doll" (non-album track)	44	36	—	—	Billy Vaughn Plays
1958	"Blue Hawaii" b/w "Tico Tico" (non-album track)	37	33	—	—	Blue Hawaii
1959	"Hawaiian War Chant" /	89	51	—	—	Blue Hawaii
1959	"Trade Winds"	—	52	—	—	Blue Hawaii
1959	"Your Cheatin' Heart" /	82	74	—	—	Non-album tracks
1959	"Lights Out"	—	100	—	—	Non-album tracks
1959	"Blues Stay Away From Me" /	—	82	—	—	Non-album tracks
1959	"All Nite Long"	102	94	—	—	Non-album tracks
1959	"Wabash Blues" b/w "Carnival in Paris" (non-album track)	—	—	—	—	Golden Saxophones
1959	"(It's No) Sin" /	105	96	—	—	A Swingin' Safari
1959	"After Hours"	—	tag	—	—	Great Golden Hits
1960	"Beg Your Pardon" /	—	98	—	—	Linger Awhile
1960	"Skaters' Waltz"	—	tag	—	—	Non-album track
1960	"You're the Only Star (In My Blue Heaven)" /	110	118	—	—	Linger Awhile
1960	"Chopsticks"	103	tag	—	—	Non-album tracks
1960	"Dutchman's Gold" b/w "Back to the Farm" (Both tracks with Walter Brennan)	30	—	—	—	Non-album tracks
1960	"Look for a Star" b/w "He'll Have to Go"	19	13	—	—	Look for a Star
1960	"Old Cape Cod" /	111	102	—	—	The Sundowners
1960	"Theme from The Sundowners"	51	38	—	—	The Sundowners
1961	"Wheels" /	28	111	—	—	Orange Blossom Special and Wheels
1961	"Orange Blossom Special"	63	100	—	—	Orange Blossom Special and Wheels
1961	"Blue Tomorrow" /	84	60	—	—	Berlin Melody
1961	"Red Wing"	—	112	—	—	Non-album tracks
1961	"Down Yonder" b/w "Born To Be With You" (from A Swingin's Safari)	—	—	—	—	Non-album tracks
1961	"Berlin Melody" /	61	55	16	—	Berlin Melody
1961	"Theme from Come September"	73	55	18	—	Berlin Melody
1961	"Everybody's Twisting Down in Mexico" b/w "Melody in the Night"	119	124	—	—	Non-album tracks
1962	"Chapel by the Sea" /	69	107	13	—	Chapel by the Sea
1962	"One Love, One Heartache"	—	112	—	—	Non-album tracks
1962	"Continental Melody" b/w "Born to Be with You" (from A Swingin' Safari)	—	—	—	—	Non-album tracks
1962	"A Swingin' Safari" b/w "Indian Love Call" (from Billy Vaughn Plays)	13	11	5	—	A Swingin' Safari
1962	"Blue Flame" /	107	123	—	—	A Swingin' Safari
1962	"Someone"	115	tag	—	—	Non-album tracks
1962	"Down Yonder" b/w "I'm Waitin'"	—	—	—	—	Non-album tracks
1963	"Meditation" b/w "Release Me" (non-album track)	—	—	—	—	Forever
1963	"Happy Cowboy" b/w "Broken Doll"	131	131	—	—	Non-album tracks
1963	"Theme From A Summer Place" b/w "Sukiyaki" (from Sukiyaki and 11 Hawaiian Hits)	—	—	—	—	Theme From "A Summer Place"
1963	"Rag Mop b/w "I'm Sorry"	—	—	—	—	Number 1 Hits, Volume 1
1963	"Cumberland County Feud" b/w "Chow Chow Amore"	—	—	—	—	Non-album tracks
1964	"Blue Tango" b/w "Boss" (non-album track)	—	—	—	—	The Golden Instrumentals
1964	"Lucky Duck" b/w "The One Rose (That's Left in My Heart)"	—	—	—	—	Forever
1964	"Chianti Song" b/w "A Guitar Serenade"	—	—	—	—	Non-album tracks
1964	"People" b/w "The World I Used to Know"	—	—	—	—	Another Hit Album!
1964	"Pearly Shells (Popo O Ewa)" b/w "Maybe"	120	—	—	—	Pearly Shells
1964	"Song of Peace" b/w "Billy's Theme"	—	—	—	—	Non-album tracks
1965	"There's a Star Spangled Banner Waving Somewhere" b/w "In the Ocean of Time"	—	—	—	—	Non-album tracks
1965	"Mexican Pearls" b/w "Woodpecker" (non-album track)	94	79	23	—	Mexican Pearls
1965	"Making Other Plans" b/w "Our Dream of Love"	—	—	—	—	Non-album tracks
1965	"Moon Over Naples" b/w "Tonight"	—	—	—	—	Moon Over Naples
1965	"Anniversary Song" b/w "Please"	—	—	—	—	Moon Over Naples
1966	"Michelle" b/w "Elaine"	77	61	17	—	Michelle
1966	"The Mexican Shuffle" b/w "Organ Grinder's Swing"	—	—	—	—	Michelle
1966	"Things Go Better" b/w "James (Steady Does It)"	—	—	—	—	Non-album tracks
1966	"It's Over" b/w "Did You Ever Have to Make Up Your Mind"	—	—	—	—	Non-album tracks
1966	"Because They're Young" b/w "Buckaroo" (non-album track)	—	—	—	—	Look for a Star
1966	"Alfie" b/w "Somewhere My Love"	—	—	—	—	Alfie
1966	"Tiny Bubbles" b/w "Too Many Hot Tacos" (non-album track)	131	—	—	—	That's Life
1967	"Sweet Maria" b/w "There Goes My Everything"	105	82	6	—	Sweet Maria
1967	"Pineapple Market" b/w "That's Life"	—	—	30	—	That's Life
1967	"I Love You (and You Love Me)" b/w "Yellow Roses Mean Goodbye"	—	—	4	—	I Love You
1968	"Lolly" b/w "Moonlight Brings Memories"	—	—	—	—	As Requested
1968	"Soulitude" b/w "St. James Infirmary"	—	—	—	—	Quietly Wild
1969	"You Win Again" b/w "No One Will Ever Know"	—	—	—	—	Nashville Saxophones
1969	"A Mansion on the Hill" b/w "I've Got You on My Mind Again"	—	—	—	—	Nashville Saxophones
1969	"The Windmills of Your Mind" b/w "The Way That I Live"	—	—	—	—	The Windmills Of Your Mind
1969	"True Grit" b/w "Odds and Ends (Of A Beautiful Love Affair)"	—	—	—	—	True Grit
1970	"Color It Cool" b/w "On Days Like These"	—	—	—	—	True Grit
1970	"Coco" b/w "Always Mademoiselle"	—	—	—	—	Winter World of Love
1970	"Come Saturday Morning" b/w "True Grit" (from True Grit)	—	—	—	—	Winter World of Love
1971	"Look What They've Done to My Song Ma" b/w "Roof Tops of Tokyo"	—	—	—	—	Non-album tracks
1972	"Butterfly" b/w "To the End of This Day" (from I Don't Know How to Love Him)	—	—	—	—	An Old Fashioned Love Song
