= Susannah McCorkle =

American jazz singer (1946–2001)

- Born: January 1, 1946; Berkeley, California, U.S.
- Died: May 19, 2001 (aged 55) New York City, U.S.
- Genres: Jazz; vocal jazz
- Occupation: Singer
- Years active: 1970s–2001
- Labels: Inner City; Pausa; Concord Jazz

Susannah McCorkle (January 1, 1946 – May 19, 2001) was an American jazz singer.

== Life and career ==
A native of Berkeley, California, McCorkle studied Italian literature at the University of California, Berkeley, before dropping out to move to Europe. She was inspired to become a singer when she heard Billie Holiday sing "I've Got a Right to Sing the Blues". She began her career in the early 1970s, singing at pubs in London with bandleader John Chilton. She also worked in London with Keith Ingham and Dick Sudhalter and recorded her first two albums, one a tribute to Harry Warren, the other to Johnny Mercer.

After moving back to the U.S. in the 1970s, she sang at the Cookery in Greenwich Village and the Riverboat in Manhattan. Later in her career, she often sang at the Algonquin Hotel.

In 1988, PBS affiliate WMHT recorded the television special Susannah McCorkle and Friends: Jazz Meets Pop at Proctor's Theatre in Schenectady, New York. It featured Gerry Mulligan, Mark Murphy, Gene Bertoncini, and Michael Moore. Critic Francis Davis, who attended the recording, named McCorkle "[t]he outstanding female jazz vocalist of her generation".

No More Blues (1989), her first album for Concord Jazz, was recorded with guitarists Emily Remler and Bucky Pizzarelli and pianist Dave Frishberg. Her writing was published in Cosmopolitan, Newsday, New York, marking her an O. Henry Award winner for short stories.

Stereo Review magazine named How Do You Keep the Music Playing (1985) as the album of the year, while critic Leonard Feather named it the vocal album of the year.

McCorkle was a polyglot. She spoke, translated, and sang in English, Italian, Portuguese, German, Spanish, and French.

A breast cancer survivor, McCorkle suffered for many years from depression. She died by suicide at age 55 by leaping off the balcony of her apartment at 41 West 86th Street in Manhattan. She was alone in her home at the time. The police immediately entered her home after identifying her body and found no evidence of foul play. Suicide was ruled the cause of death.

== Discography ==
- The Music of Harry Warren (Inner City, 1976)
- The Quality of Mercer (Inner City, 1980)
- Over the Rainbow: The Songs of E.Y. 'Yip' Harburg (Inner City, 1981)
- The People That You Never Get to Love (Inner City, 1981)
- Thanks for the Memory: Songs of Leo Robin (Pausa, 1984)
- How Do You Keep the Music Playing? (Pausa, 1985)
- Dream (Pausa, 1987)
- As Time Goes by (CBS/Sony, 1987)
- No More Blues (Concord Jazz, 1989)
- Sabia (Concord Jazz, 1990)
- I'll Take Romance (Concord Jazz, 1992)
- From Bessie to Brazil (Concord Jazz, 1993)
- From Broadway to Bebop (Concord Jazz, 1994)
- Easy to Love: The Songs of Cole Porter (Concord Jazz, 1996)
- Let's Face the Music: The Songs of Irving Berlin (Concord Jazz, 1997)
- Someone to Watch Over Me: The Songs of George Gershwin (Concord Jazz, 1998)
- From Broken Hearts to Blue Skies (Concord Jazz, 1999)
- Hearts and Minds (Concord Jazz, 2000)
- Most Requested Songs (Concord Jazz, 2001)
- Ballad Essentials (Concord Jazz, 2002)
- The Beginning: 1975 (Challenge, 2002)
- Adeus: The Berlin Concert (Sonorama, 2015)

== Biography ==
- Dahl, Linda (2006). Haunted Heart: A Biography of Susannah McCorkle. Ann Arbor: University of Michigan Press. ISBN 978-0-472-11564-8.
