= New Look =

New Look may refer to:

- New Look (style of clothing), a line of clothing by Christian Dior
- New Look (company), a clothing retailer based in the United Kingdom
- New Look (policy), a United States foreign policy at the start of the Cold War
- GM New Look bus, a city bus made by General Motors from 1959 to 1986
- New Look (band), a Canadian electronic music duo
  - New Look (album)
- New Look (TV series), a 1958–1959 British television show
- The New Look (TV series), a 2024 USA television show
- New Look!, a 1967 album by George Shearing
