= Midnight on Cloud 69 =

1956 album by the George Shearing Quintet, Red Norvo Trio

Studio album by George Shearing Quintet, Red Norvo Trio
- Released: 1956
- Recorded: 31 January 1949 (1–4, 7–10); May 1950 (11, 12); 13 April 1951 (5, 6)
- Genre: Jazz
- Length: 38:44
- Label: Savoy Records (MG 12093)

George Shearing Quintet, Red Norvo Trio chronology
| The Shearing Spell (1955) | Midnight on Cloud 69 (1956) | Black Satin (1956) |

Professional ratings
Review scores
| Source | Rating |
|---|---|
| AllMusic | 3/5 stars |
| John Swenson | 3.5/5 stars |

Midnight on Cloud 69 is a 1956 studio album by the George Shearing Quintet and the Red Norvo Trio.

== Recording ==
The tracks by the George Shearing Quintet (numbers 1–4, 7–10) were recorded on 31 January 1949 for Discovery Records, following the formation of the quintet that year. The Red Norvo Trio tracks were recorded in May 1950 (11, 12) and on 13 April 1951 (5, 6). The Quintet tracks were originally released as an LP by Discovery (DL3002) in 1950.

Shearing later wrote in 2004:

Although it was a complete session of jazz titles—it contained hardly any standards—and because we played mostly originals, there was nothing for the listening public to catch on to and to understand that this was a new sound, a new approach to playing melodies. The sound was there in embryo, in fact the Quintet format was pretty well developed, but it was going to take something else for it really to catch on.

He later stated that the album's title is a euphemism referring to the 69 sex position.

== Reception ==
A review on 27 May 1957 in Billboard wrote that the album's tracks "have [a] life and swing that [the] commercial success of 'quintet sound' has since watered down [...] [the] Norvo tracks are a matter of delightful empathy; Mingus and Farlow enmesh well with leader, and all play solos of great rhythmic and melodic interest." Critic John S. Wilson, in 1959, called the Trio's playing "relatively fuzzy", as compared to their 1950 album Move!

Geoff Chapman summarised Shearing's contributions on the album in 1993: "His timeless easy-on-the-ear has the delicacy of a combination of Teddy Wilson and Maurice Ravel and there's rare accompaniment in the form of vibist Marjorie Hyams and guitarist Chuck Wayne. There's Shearing originals among the eight tracks but his best work is reserved for 'Cherokee' and 'I'm Yours'."

Richard Cook wrote in 1998 that the album sets Shearing "alongside two different groups, one with Hyams, Wayne, Levy and Best, playing in the manner that brought him hits such as 'Lullaby of Birdland', the other in the more demanding company of Norvo, Farlow and Mingus, although it's hardly a cutting contest. Titles such as 'Cotton Top', 'Be Bop's Fables' and 'Night and Day' still sound cooly pleasant."

Shearing's piano solo on the title track has been said to have codified his "block-chord solo style" (sometimes called "Shearing voicing"), a number of years before Lennie Tristano's use of the style (exemplified on his 1956 album Lennie Tristano).

== Track listing ==
Side A
| No. | Title | Writer(s) | Performed by | Length |
|---|---|---|---|---|
| 1. | "Sorry Wrong Rhumba" | Leonard Feather | George Shearing Quintet | 3:21 |
| 2. | "Cotton Top" | Chuck Wayne | George Shearing Quintet | 2:50 |
| 3. | "Be Bop's Fables" | Leonard Feather | George Shearing Quintet | 3:04 |
| 4. | "Midnight On Cloud 69" | Leonard Feather | George Shearing Quintet | 3:10 |
| 5. | "Little White Lies" | Walter Donaldson | Red Norvo Trio | 3:50 |
| 6. | "I'm Yours" | Johnny Green, Yip Harburg | Red Norvo Trio | 4:11 |
| Total length: | | | | 20:26 |

Side B
| No. | Title | Writer(s) | Performed by | Length |
|---|---|---|---|---|
| 7. | "Moon Over Miami" | Joe Burke, Edgar Leslie | George Shearing Quintet | 3:13 |
| 8. | "Cherokee" | Ray Noble | George Shearing Quintet | 2:44 |
| 9. | "Life With Feather" | Leonard Feather | George Shearing Quintet | 3:11 |
| 10. | "Four Bars Short" | George Shearing | George Shearing Quintet | 2:24 |
| 11. | "Time and Tide" | Red Norvo | Red Norvo Trio | 2:37 |
| 12. | "Night and Day" | Cole Porter | Red Norvo Trio | 4:09 |
| Total length: | | | | 18:18 |

== Personnel ==
- George Shearing – piano (1–4, 7, 9), accordion (8, 10)
- Margie Hyams – vibraphone (1–4, 7, 9), piano (8, 10)
- Chuck Wayne – guitar (1–4, 7–10)
- John Levy – bass (1–4, 7–10)
- Denzil Best – drums (1–4, 7–10)
- Tal Farlow – guitar (5, 6, 11, 12)
- Charles Mingus – bass (5, 6, 11, 12)
- Red Norvo – vibraphone (5, 6, 11, 12)
