= A Perfect Match (George Shearing and Ernestine Anderson album) =

Studio album by George Shearing and Ernestine Anderson
- Released: 1988
- Recorded: May 1988
- Genre: Jazz
- Length: 51:55
- Label: Concord CJ 357
- Producer: Carl Jefferson

George Shearing chronology
| The Spirit of 176 (1988) | A Perfect Match (1988) | George Shearing in Dixieland (1989) |

Ernestine Anderson chronology
| Ow! (1987) | A Perfect Match (1988) | Boogie Down (1989) |

A Perfect Match is a 1988 album by jazz pianist George Shearing and the singer Ernestine Anderson. The pair had previously appeared together on Shearing's 1988 live album Dexterity.

== Reception ==
Professional ratings
Review scores
| Source | Rating |
|---|---|
| Allmusic | 4/5 stars |
| The Penguin Guide to Jazz Recordings | 2.5/4 stars |

Scott Yanow reviewed the album for Allmusic and wrote that "...Shearing and Anderson mostly stick to standards and their versions uplift the veteran songs. "Body and Soul" is taken as a vocal-piano duet, while "The Best Thing for You" is given an instrumental treatment. Other highlights include Anderson's vocals on "I'll Take Romance," a heartfelt "I Remember Clifford," "On the Sunny Side of the Street" and "Some Other Time." Perfect Match is an excellent outing for all concerned".

== Track listing ==
1. "Trust in Me" (Milton Ager, Jean Schwartz, Ned Wever) – 3:52
2. "I'll Take Romance" (Oscar Hammerstein II, Ben Oakland) – 2:40
3. "Body and Soul" (Frank Eyton, Johnny Green, Edward Heyman, Robert Sour) – 4:46
4. "The Best Thing for You (Would Be Me)" (Irving Berlin) – 3:33
5. "I Remember Clifford" (Benny Golson) – 4:54
6. "On the Sunny Side of the Street" (Dorothy Fields, Jimmy McHugh) – 3:14
7. "The Second Time Around" (Sammy Cahn, Jimmy Van Heusen) – 3:55
8. "Falling in Love with Love" (Lorenz Hart, Richard Rodgers) – 3:01
9. "That's for Me" (Hammerstein, Rodgers) – 4:28
10. "I Won't Dance" (Fields, Otto Harbach, Hammerstein, Jerome Kern, McHugh) – 3:52
11. "Some Other Time" (Cahn, Jule Styne) – 5:27
12. "The Touch of Your Lips" (Ray Noble) – 2:25
13. "Lullaby of Birdland" (George Shearing, George David Weiss) – 3:34
14. "The Things We Did Last Summer" (Cahn, Styne) – 3:07

== Personnel ==
- George Shearing – piano
- Ernestine Anderson – vocals
- Neil Swainson – double bass
- Jeff Hamilton – drums

Production

- Phil Edwards – engineer
- Leonard Feather – liner notes
- George Horn – mastering
- Carl Jefferson – producer
