= Neil Swainson =

Canadian jazz bassist (born 1955)

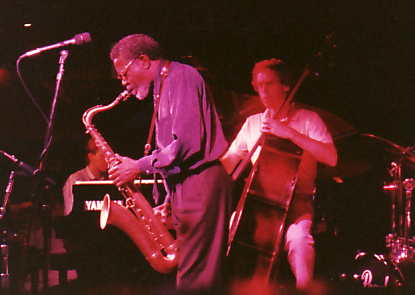
- Neil Swainson (right) plays bass with Joe Henderson

Background information
- Born: Neil James Sinclair Swainson; November 15, 1955 (age 69); Victoria, British Columbia, Canada
- Genres: Jazz
- Occupation: Musician
- Instrument: Bass

Neil James Sinclair Swainson (born November 15, 1955) is a Canadian jazz bassist. Swainson started his career in Victoria, British Columbia, when he supported visiting American musicians such as Herb Ellis, Barney Kessell, and Sonny Stitt. In 1976 he moved to Vancouver after playing with the Paul Horn Quintet and leading a band for two years. He moved to Toronto in 1977.

== Music career ==
Swainson has been a leading Canadian jazz player since the 1980s when he started playing with famous local and visiting acts including Tommy Flanagan, Rob McConnell, Ed Bickert, Slide Hampton, James Moody, Jay McShann, Moe Koffman, Lee Konitz, Joe Farrell, George Coleman, and Woody Shaw. He went on to collaborate with Woody Shaw, appearing on two of Shaw's recordings: In My Own Sweet Way (In & Out 7003) and Solid (Muse 5329). He also toured with Shaw often in New York and on many European tours.

A collaboration between Swainson and pianist George Shearing would form in 1986, after Swainson replaced Don Thompson in 1988. This relationship continued until Shearing's passing in 2011. They have travelled playing all across North America, Great Britain, Europe, Australia, Hong Kong, and Japan. They played with musicians including Joe Williams, Nancy Wilson, Diana Krall, Robert Farnon and Mel Tormé. Together the two made numerous recordings which include: A Perfect Match (with Ernestine Anderson, (Concord Jazz 4357), Dexterity (Concord Jazz 4346), Mel & George "do" World War II (Concord Jazz 4471), I Hear a Rhapsody (Telarc 83310), How Beautiful is Night (with Robert Farnon, Telarc 83325), Walkin' (Telarc 83333), That Shearing Sound (Telarc 83347), Joe Williams: A Song Is Born and Paper Moon (Telarc 83375).

In 1987, Swainson recorded his own album, 49th Parallel (Concord Jazz 4396). His recordings feature Woody Shaw on trumpet and Joe Henderson on saxophone along with numerous other musicians such as Jay McShann, Geoff Keezer, Doc Cheatham, Sam Noto, Don Thompson, Peter Leitch, Pat LaBarbera, Joe LaBarbera, Rob McConnell, Ed Bickert, Lorne Lofsky, Kirk MacDonald and JMOG, a cooperative band featuring, Kevin Dean and Pat LaBarbera.

Swainson has recently toured worldwide with singer Roberta Gambarini and with pianist Gene DiNovi in Japan. He recorded So In Love (Marshmallow MYCJ30118) and Golden Earrings (Marshmallow MYCJ30185) and recorded Smile (Five Stars Records FSY-501) and Gene DiNovi at Red Brick Warehouse Live in Yokohama (Marshmallow MMEX-103). Swainson now works at Humber College (Lakeshore Campus) as a professor in the Bass department after receiving a music degree. He also continues to compose music and freelance in Toronto.

== Awards and honors ==
- 1990 Best Jazz Album – Jon Ballantyne, Skydance (Justin Time)
- 1993 Best Jazz Album – P. J. Perry, My Ideal (Unity)
- 1999 Best Mainstream Jazz Album – Kirk MacDonald, The Atlantic Sessions (Koch)
- 2000 Best Traditional Album – Instrumental – Pat LaBarbera, Deep in a Dream (Radioland)

== Discography ==
=== As leader ===
- 49th Parallel (Concord Jazz, 1987)
- Fire in the West (Cellar Live, 2022)
- Here For A While (Cellar Live, 2024)

=== As sideman ===
With Jay McShann

- Airmail Special (Sack, 1985)

With Walter Norris

- Lush Life (Concord Jazz, 1990)

With Woody Shaw

- Solid (Muse, 1986)
- In My Own Sweet Way (In + Out, 1987)

With George Shearing

- Dexterity (Concord Jazz, 1987)
- A Perfect Match (Concord Jazz, 1988)
- George Shearing in Dixieland (Concord Jazz, 1989)
