= On a Clear Day =

On a Clear Day may refer to:

- On a Clear Day (film), a 2005 Scottish drama film
- On a Clear Day (George Shearing album), 1980
- On a Clear Day (Shirley Scott album), 1966

== See also ==
- "On a Clear Day (You Can See Forever)", a 1965 song by Burton Lane and Alan Jay Lerner, recorded by American vocalist Barbra Streisand
- On a Clear Day You Can See Forever, a 1965 musical
- On a Clear Day You Can See Forever (film), the 1970 film adaptation of that musical
- On a Clear Day I Can't See My Sister, the eleventh episode of the sixteenth season of The Simpsons
