= Dexterity (George Shearing album) =

Live album by George Shearing
- Released: 1988
- Recorded: November 1987
- Venue: Kan-i Hoken Hall, Tokyo, Japan
- Genre: Jazz
- Label: Concord CJ 346
- Producer: Carl Jefferson

George Shearing chronology
More Grand Piano (1986)	Dexterity (1988)	The Spirit of 176 (1988)

Dexterity is a 1988 live album by the jazz pianist George Shearing recorded at the second Fujitsu-Concord Jazz Festival. The singer Ernestine Anderson appears on two tracks. Shearing and Anderson would later record the album A Perfect Match.

== Reception ==
Professional ratings
Review scores
Source	Rating
Allmusic	4/5 stars

Scott Yanow reviewed the album for Allmusic, describing it as "A well-rounded and consistently enjoyable program".

== Track listing ==
1. "Dexterity" (Charlie Parker) – 5:17
2. "You Must Believe in Spring" (Alan and Marilyn Bergman, Jacques Demy, Michel Legrand) – 7:53
3. "Sakura Sakura (Cherry Blossom)" (Traditional) – 5:13
4. "Kjo No Tsuki" (Rentaro Taki) – 3:00
5. "I Won't Dance" (Dorothy Fields, Otto Harbach, Oscar Hammerstein II, Jerome Kern, Jimmy McHugh) – 5:08
6. "Long Ago (and Far Away)" (Ira Gershwin, Jerome Kern) – 5:03
7. "Can't We Be Friends?" (Paul James, Kay Swift) – 3:08
8. "As Long as I Live" (Harold Arlen, Ted Koehler) – 4:19
9. "Please Send Me Someone to Love" (Percy Mayfield) – 6:49
10. Duke Ellington medley: "Take the "A" Train"/"In a Sentimental Mood"/"Just Squeeze Me (But Please Don't Tease Me)"/"Satin Doll"/"Cotton Tail" (Billy Strayhorn)/(Duke Ellington, Manny Kurtz, Irving Mills)/(Ellington, Lee Gaines)/(Ellington, Strayhorn, Johnny Mercer)/(Ellington) – 7:21
11. "Lullaby of Birdland" (George Shearing, George David Weiss) – 5:30

== Personnel ==
- George Shearing – piano
- Ernestine Anderson – vocals on "As Long As I Live" and "Please Send Me Someone to Love"
- Neil Swainson – double bass
- Carl Jefferson – producer
- Kent Judkins – art direction
- Chris Long – assistant producer
- Tom Burgess – cover art concept
- Hatsuro Takanami – engineer
- Leonard Feather – liner notes
- George Horn – mastering
- K. Abe – photography
- Kazumi Someya – project interpreter
- Ron Davis – remixing
- Allen Farnham – remote supervisor
- Yoichi Nakao – technical coordinator
