= Prelude, Op. 28, No. 20 (Chopin) =

Piano composition by Frédéric Chopin

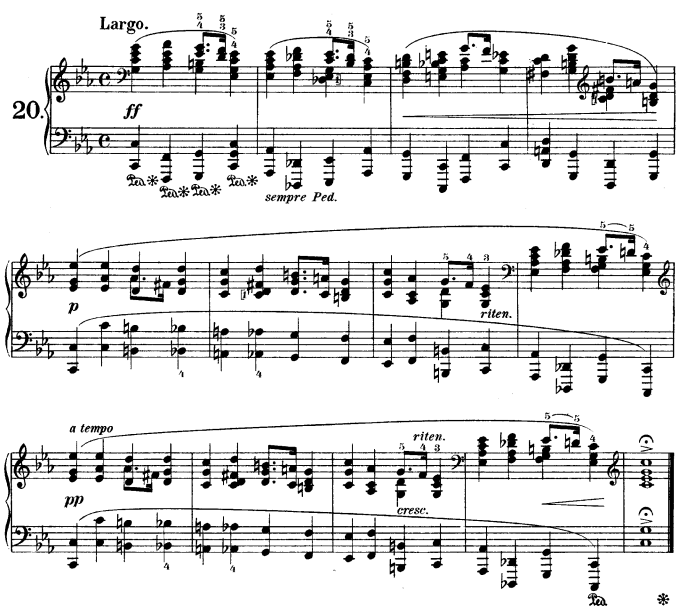

Prelude Op. 28 - No. 20 by Ivan Ilic

The Prelude Op. 28, No. 20, in C minor by Frédéric Chopin was dubbed the "Funeral March" by Hans von Bülow but is commonly known as the "Chord Prelude" due to its slow progression of quarter note chords. It was written between 1831 and 1839.

The prelude was originally written in two sections of four measures. Chopin later added a repeat of the last four measures at a softer level, with an expressive swell before the final cadence. In addition, the prelude uses lament bass in two of the three sections, a technique commonly used to denote sadness or sorrow.

== Bar 3 ambiguity ==
In many printed scores (for example "Chopin Masterpieces for Solo Piano", Dover Publications Ltd 1998), the last E of bar 3 in the right hand has no flat accidental to cancel the natural accidental of the previous E in the same bar. Therefore, this second E should also be played as E♮. However, most performances contradict the printed score, playing an E♭. Alfred Cortot in 1926 and 1933 recordings, Arthur Rubinstein's mono recording of the entire set of Op. 28 on RCA, Emil Gilels recording from 1953 (”Emil Gilels Legacy Vol. 9” on Doremi), Maurizio Pollini's 1975 recording for Deutsche Grammophon, and Louis Lortie's 1998 recording for Chandos are some of the recordings where the E is played as natural.

It is sometimes argued that the E should remain as an E♮, as in the following bar (bar 4), the final chord is a major chord (G major), and since bar 4 acts as a harmonic sequence from bar 3 ending on the dominant, its final chord should theoretically also be major, resulting in the E in the C major chord remaining natural. This sequence from bar 3 to bar 4 is apparent due to the almost-identical chord structure (the only difference being the cadence) in different tonal centres—bar 3 in C major/minor and bar 4 in G major (the dominant).

Comparison of the chord progressions in bar 3 and bar 4
Beat (in 4/4)	Bar 3 chord	Bar 4 chord	Interval between chords
1	G^{7}	D^{7}	Perfect fifth
2	C^{7}	G major	Perfect fifth
3	F minor (with G appoggiatura)	D^{7} (with B appoggiatura)	Major sixth
4	C major (or minor)	G major	Perfect fifth

The fourth chord in bar 3 being major would match the fourth chord in bar 4 if the E were natural, meaning the chord would be C major. On the contrary, it may have been intended by Chopin for the E to be an E♭, despite not sharing the same tonal quality of the proceeding bar.

It is rumoured that Polish scores show the flat accidentally and that all other versions are incorrect due to a type-setting error.

On page 64 of Chopin, An Introduction to His Piano Works (2005), Willard A. Palmer notes that "Chopin is supposed to have added a flat sign before the E in a copy belonging to one of his pupils. It does not appear in the Autograph or the original editions."

Musicologist Jean-Jacques Eigeldinger posits that Chopin intended to include the flat accidental, citing both manuscripts with the accidental (Jane Stirling's, George Sand's, Cheremetieff's) and Auguste Franchomme's transcriptions of the prelude for other instruments, all of which include the flat or its transposed equivalent.

== Cultural legacy ==
There are a number of references to this prelude in contemporary culture, and these are just a few examples.

- Ferruccio Busoni composed a set of variations, Variationen und Fuge in freier Form über Fr. Chopin's C-moll Präludium, on Prelude No. 20.
- Sergei Rachmaninoff used Prelude No. 20 as his inspiration for Variations on a Theme of Chopin, a set of 22 variations in a wide range of keys, tempos and lengths
- Vince Guaraldi quotes Prelude No. 20 in his rendition of the jazz standard Autumn Leaves.
- George Shearing included a modern arrangement of the piece in his 1963 Old Gold and Ivory.
- Bud Powell performed the prelude for his live album Holidays in Edenville.
- The Bill Evans Trio, with Symphony Orchestra, played this prelude in 1965, with an arrangement penned by Claus Ogerman for his album Bill Evans Trio with Symphony Orchestra. For this album, the prelude was titled "Blue Interlude".
- Jean-Luc Ponty, Jazz fusion artist, included a version with violin improvisation on his album Storytelling
- "Could It Be Magic" by Barry Manilow is based on Prelude No. 20 and reached No. 6 on the US charts in 1975. The song was later covered by Donna Summer and Take That. The song was also covered by French singer Alain Chamfort in 1975 under the title «Le Temps qui court».
- The intro and outro to The Moody Blues' early single "Love and Beauty", composed and sung by original member Mike Pinder, features this piano passage.
- The 1988 film Madame Sousatzka features Shirley MacLaine teaching Prelude No. 20 to a gifted piano student.
- Metal band, Angra, recorded a variation of Prelude No. 20 for their 2001 Rebirth album entitled "Visions Prelude".
- The music for the Commodore 64 version of the videogame Ghosts 'n Goblins by Mark Cooksey is based on Prelude No. 20.
- The funeral doom metal band Pantheist used part of Prelude No. 20 in "Envy Us," from their album O Solitude.
- Ken Skinner recorded a version of Prelude No. 20 as a jazz trio piece for the CD Maroon in 1996 under the title "Farewell Europa".
- Jazz trumpeter Chris Botti's 2012 CD Impressions includes a version of Prelude No. 20 as the album's first track.
- The Piano Guys includes variations of parts of Prelude No. 20 in "Kung Fu Piano: Cello Ascends", where not only the variations are used in the finale, but they are also used in many parts of the piece as a harmonic element.
- Marcin Grochowina published trio-variation and improvisation with this prelude in 2015 on the CD "Chopin Visions". For this album, the prelude was titled "Prelude in c"
- In Episode 2 of the Soap Opera "Dark Shadows", Elizabeth plays Prelude, Op. 28, No. 20 on the piano.
