= In the Night (George Shearing and Dakota Staton album) =

Studio album by George Shearing and Dakota Staton
- Released: 1958
- Recorded: 1958
- Genre: Jazz
- Label: Capitol T1003

George Shearing chronology
Latin Affair (1958)	In the Night (1958)	Satin Brass (1989)

Dakota Staton chronology
The Late, Late Show (1957)	In the Night (1958)	Dynamic! (1958)

In the Night is a 1958 album by the jazz pianist George Shearing and the singer Dakota Staton. A quintet accompanies the pair. Staton sings on six tracks; the rest are instrumentals.

== Reception ==
Professional ratings
Review scores
Source	Rating
Allmusic	4.5/5 stars

The initial Billboard review from May 19, 1958, commented that "Success of Miss Staton's previous LP...plus the powerful allure of the "Shearing" sound makes this a likely click in both pop and jazz marts...Attractive cover shot of the artists".

John Bush reviewed the album for Allmusic and wrote that "With its progressive-leaning jazz and modernist blues vocals, In the Night was the prototype for the piano-vocals collaboration record that George Shearing would remake with Peggy Lee, Nat King Cole, and Nancy Wilson while at Capitol (and many others afterwards)." Bush highlighted the quintet's work on "From Rags to Richards" and "Pawn Ticket"; and described Staton as bringing her "post-bop vocal prowess and late-night melodrama" to the songs. Bush felt the album was "one of the finest teamings in either's career".

== Track listing ==
1. "From Rags to Richards" (George Shearing) – 3:15
2. "(I'm Left with the) Blues in My Heart" (Benny Carter, Irving Mills) – 2:58
3. "Pawn Ticket" (Ray Bryant) – 2:22
4. "In the Night" (Norman Mapp) – 2:03
5. "Easy" (Shearing) – 2:43
6. "I Hear Music" (Burton Lane, Frank Loesser) – 2:32
7. "Señor Blues" (Horace Silver) – 3:49
8. "Confessin' the Blues" (Walter Brown, Jay McShann) – 2:46
9. "Later" (Bryant) – 2:20
10. "The Thrill Is Gone" (Lew Brown, Ray Henderson) – 3:10
11. "The Late, Late Show" (Roy Alfred, Murray Berlin) – 2:34
12. "I'd Love to Make Love to You" (Bob Emmerich, Ruth Poll) – 2:44

== Personnel ==
- George Shearing – piano
- Dakota Staton – vocals on "(I'm Left with the) Blues in My Heart", "In the Night", "I Hear Music", "Confessin' the Blues", "The Thrill Is Gone" and "I'd Love to Make Love to You"
- Toots Thielemans – guitar
- Emil Richards – vibraphone
- Al McKibbon – double bass
- Armando Peraza – bongos, conga
- Percy Brice – drums, percussion
