= Touch Me Softly =

Studio album by George Shearing
- Released: 1963
- Recorded: January 14–February 15, 1963
- Genre: Traditional pop, jazz
- Label: Capitol ST 1874

George Shearing chronology
Shearing Bossa Nova (1962)	Touch Me Softly (1963)	Jazz Concert (1963)

Touch Me Softly is a 1963 album by George Shearing accompanied by his quintet and a string orchestra.

== Reception ==
Professional ratings
Review scores
Source	Rating
Allmusic	2.5/5 stars

Scott Yanow reviewed the album for Allmusic and wrote that "Best is a touching version of "Sunday, Monday or Always"...Actually, for this type of "dreamy" romantic music, the performances are excellent, but one should not expect much jazz on this out-of-print LP."

== Track listing ==
1. "Just Imagine" (Buddy DeSylva, Lew Brown, Ray Henderson) - 2:34
2. "Blue Room" (Richard Rodgers, Lorenz Hart) - 2:33
3. "You're Blasé" (Bruce Sievier, Ord Hamilton) - 3:07
4. "Wait for Me" (Charles DeForest) - 3:05
5. "Try a Little Tenderness" (Jimmy Campbell, Reginald Connelly, Harry M. Woods) - 2:45
6. "Suddenly It's Spring" (Jimmy Van Heusen, Johnny Burke) - 2:41
7. "Be Careful, It's My Heart" (Irving Berlin) - 2:18
8. "Sunday, Monday, or Always" (Van Heusen, Burke) - 2:40
9. "Lollipops and Roses" (Tony Velona) - 2:40
10. "Just as Though You Were Here" (Edgar De Lange, John Benson Brooks) - 3:12
11. "Touch Me Softly" (Dick Allen, Stan Hoffman) - 3:37
12. "In a Sentimental Mood" (Duke Ellington, Irving Mills, Manny Kurtz) - 3:22

== Personnel ==
- George Shearing - piano, arranger
- Gary Burton or Douglas Marsh - vibraphone
- Ron Anthony - guitar
- Ralph Peña - double bass
- Vernel Fournier - drums
- Milt Raskin - conducting string choir

Recorded in Los Angeles, 1963.
