= The Reunion (George Shearing and Stéphane Grappelli album) =

Studio album by George Shearing and Stéphane Grappelli
- Released: 1976
- Recorded: April 11, 1976 at Hans Georg Brunner-Schwer Studio, Villingen-Schwenningen, West Germany
- Genre: Jazz
- Length: 42:58
- Label: MPS 15482
- Producer: Hans Georg Brunner-Schwer

George Shearing chronology
The Many Facets of George Shearing (1976)	The Reunion (1976)	Windows (1977)

Stéphane Grappelli chronology
The Reunion (1976)

The Reunion is a 1976 album by jazz pianist George Shearing and violinist Stéphane Grappelli.

== Reception ==
Professional ratings
Review scores
Source	Rating
Allmusic	4.5/5 stars

Ron Wynn reviewed the album for Allmusic and wrote that "Shearing's sessions are usually more introspective and light than upbeat and hot, but Grappelli's soaring, exuberant violin solos seem to put a charge into Shearing, who responds with some of his hottest playing in many years".

== Track listing ==
1. "I'm Coming Virginia" (Donald Heywood, Will Marion Cook) – 3:00
2. "Time After Time" (Jule Styne, Sammy Cahn) – 4:43
3. "La Chanson de Rue" (Stéphane Grappelli) – 3:55
4. "Too Marvelous for Words" (Richard A. Whiting, Johnny Mercer) – 4:04
5. "It Don't Mean a Thing (If It Ain't Got That Swing)" (Duke Ellington, Irving Mills) – 4:06
6. "Makin' Whoopee" (Gus Kahn, Walter Donaldson) – 5:03
7. "After You've Gone" (Henry Creamer, Turner Layton) – 4:18
8. "Flamingo" (Edmund Anderson, Ted Grouya) – 4:21
9. "Star Eyes" (Don Raye, Gene de Paul) – 3:10
10. "The Folks Who Live On the Hill" (Jerome Kern, Oscar Hammerstein II) – 5:34

== Personnel ==
- George Shearing – piano, liner notes
- Stéphane Grappelli – violin
- Andy Simpkins – double bass
- Rusty Jones – drums

Production

- Martin Kunzler – liner notes
- David Redfern, U. Erdt – photography
- Franz Froeb – cover design
- Willi Fruth – recording director
- Hans Georg Brunner-Schwer – producer, engineer
