= Jazz Concert =

Live album by George Shearing
- Released: 1963
- Recorded: 16 February 1963 at the Santa Monica Civic Auditorium
- Genre: Jazz
- Label: Capitol ST 1992

George Shearing chronology
Touch Me Softly (1963)	Jazz Concert (1963)	Out of the Woods (1963)

Jazz Concert is a 1963 live album by George Shearing and his quintet, recorded 16 February 1963 at the Santa Monica Civic Auditorium.

== Reception ==
Professional ratings
Review scores
Source	Rating
Allmusic	3/5 stars
DownBeat	4/5 stars

Scott Yanow reviewed the album for Allmusic and wrote that "The most memorable tracks include "Walkin'," "Love Walked In", and a nearly 12-minute rendition of "Love Is Just Around the Corner." Although the group always had a dominant easy-listening sound, a lot of hard-swinging often took place beneath the surface, particularly during their live sets."

Harvey Pekar of DownBeat noted, "Shearing's inventiveness, excellent sense of pace, and rhythmic suppleness place this selection in a class with his better work of 12 to 15 years ago."

== Track listing ==
1. "Walkin'" (Richard Carpenter) - 7:50
2. "Love Is Just Around the Corner" (Lewis Gensler, Leo Robin) - 11:50
3. "I Cover the Waterfront" (Johnny Green, Edward Heyman) - 6:28
4. "Love Walked In" (George Gershwin, Ira Gershwin) - 5:55
5. "There with You" (Dick Garcia) - 4:30
6. "Bel Aire" (Ray Bryant) - 4:10

== Personnel ==
- George Shearing - piano
- Gary Burton - vibraphone
- John Gray - guitar
- Bill Yancey - double bass
- Vernel Fournier - drums
