= Grand Piano (album) =

Studio album by George Shearing
- Released: 1985
- Recorded: 1985
- Genre: Jazz
- Length: 39:18
- Label: Concord
- Producer: Carl Jefferson

George Shearing chronology
| An Elegant Evening (1985) | Grand Piano (1985) | George Shearing & Barry Tuckwell Play the Music of Cole Porter (1986) |

Professional ratings
Review scores
| Source | Rating |
|---|---|
| AllMusic | 3/5 stars |
| The Penguin Guide to Jazz | 2/4 stars |

Grand Piano is a 1985 studio album by the pianist George Shearing.

This was Shearing's first album of solo piano for Concord Records, it was followed by More Grand Piano (1986).

== Track listing ==
1. "When a Woman Loves a Man" (Bernie Hanighen, Gordon Jenkins, Johnny Mercer) – 4:31
2. "It Never Entered My Mind" (Lorenz Hart, Richard Rodgers) – 4:48
3. "Mack the Knife" (Marc Blitzstein, Bertolt Brecht, Kurt Weill) – 4:44
4. "Nobody Else But Me" (Oscar Hammerstein II, Jerome Kern) – 3:31
5. "Imitations" (George Shearing, George David Weiss) – 2:43
6. "Taking a Chance on Love" (Vernon Duke, Ted Fetter, John La Touche) – 2:39
7. "If I Had You" (James Campbell, Reginald Connelly, Ted Shapiro) – 4:50
8. "How Insensitive" (Norman Gimbel, Antonio Carlos Jobim) – 3:16
9. "You'd Be So Easy to Love" (Cole Porter) – 3:50
10. "While We're Young" (Billy Wilder) – 5:03

== Personnel ==
=== Performance ===
- George Shearing – piano
