= Old Gold and Ivory =

Studio album by George Shearing
- Released: 1964
- Recorded: 1963, 1964
- Genre: Traditional pop
- Length: 33:09
- Label: Capitol ST 2048
- Producer: Dave Cavanaugh

George Shearing chronology
Out of the Woods (1964)	Old Gold and Ivory (1964)	It's Real George (1965)

Old Gold and Ivory is a 1963 album by George Shearing accompanied by his quintet and a string orchestra, conducted by Milt Raskin.

== Reception ==
Professional ratings
Review scores
Source	Rating
Allmusic	2/5 stars
Record Mirror	4/5 stars

The initial Billboard review from April 25, 1964 said that "The results are smooth, uncomplicated, and creatively exciting musical fare" and that the "underlying these throughout is one of torrid seriousness".

Scott Yanow reviewed the album for Allmusic and wrote that "Shearing did the arrangements himself for strings, French horns, and woodwinds (the personnel is unidentified), but, overall, the performances never rise above the level of sleepy background music. The music is well played and pleasant overall but not particularly memorable, and certainly not very stimulating. "

== Track listing ==
1. "Ritual Fire Dance" (Manuel de Falla) – 2:50
2. "Prelude, Op. 28, No. 20" (Frédéric Chopin) – 2:11
3. "Theme from Scheherazade" (Nikolai Rimsky-Korsakov) – 2:19
4. "None But the Lonely Heart" (Pyotr Ilyich Tchaikovsky) – 3:42
5. "Variations on a Theme of Paganini" (Johannes Brahms) – 2:30
6. "Malaguena" (Ernesto Lecuona) – 1:57
7. "Country Gardens" (Traditional; arr Percy Grainger) – 3:02
8. "Lotus Land" (Cyril Scott) – 3:40
9. "Solveig's Song" (Edvard Grieg) – 3:29
10. "Fantaisie-Impromptu" (Chopin) – 2:14
11. "Pavane" (Gabriel Fauré) – 5:15

== Personnel ==
- George Shearing - piano, arranger
- Unidentified - French horn, woodwind
- Milt Raskin - conducting, orchestration
