= Blues Alley Jazz =

Live album by George Shearing
- Released: 1980
- Recorded: October 1979
- Genre: Jazz
- Length: 39:07
- Label: Concord
- Producer: Carl Jefferson

George Shearing chronology
Getting in the Swing of Things (1979)	Blues Alley Jazz (1980)	Two for the Road (1980)

Professional ratings
Review scores
Source	Rating
Allmusic	4/5 stars
The Rolling Stone Jazz Record Guide	3/5 stars

Blues Alley Jazz is a 1980 live album by the pianist George Shearing, accompanied by the double bassist Brian Torff.

== Track listing ==
1. "One for the Woofer" (Billy Taylor) – 8:04
2. "Autumn in New York" (Vernon Duke) – 4:42
3. "The Masquerade Is Over" (Herb Magidson, Allie Wrubel) – 6:18
4. "That's What She Says" (Manfredo Fest) – 3:45
5. "Soon It's Gonna Rain" (Tom Jones, Harvey Schmidt) – 4:34
6. "High and Inside" (Brian Torff) – 3:28
7. "For Every Man There's a Woman" (Harold Arlen, Leo Robin) – 3:41
8. "This Couldn't Be the Real Thing" (Gerry Mulligan, Mel Tormé) – 3:17
9. "(Up A) Lazy River" (Sidney Arodin, Hoagy Carmichael) – 4:59

== Personnel ==
=== Performance ===
- George Shearing – piano
- Brian Torff - double bass
