= Latin Lace =

Studio album by George Shearing
- Released: March 1958
- Recorded: 1958
- Studio: Capitol (Hollywood)
- Genre: Jazz, Afro-Cuban jazz
- Label: Capitol ST 1082
- Producer: Dave Cavanaugh

George Shearing chronology
Burnished Brass (1958)	Latin Lace (1958)	George Shearing on Stage! (1958)

Latin Lace is a 1958 album by jazz pianist George Shearing and his quintet.

Latin Lace is one of a number of themed recordings with deliberately sexualised album covers that Shearing and his quintet produced in the 1950s; in his 2005 autobiography Lullaby of Birdland, Shearing recalled that the liner notes for the album implored the listener to "add a little spice into your pad with these twelve hot little numbers!".

== Reception ==
Professional ratings
Review scores
Source	Rating
Allmusic	3/5 stars

Scott Yanow reviewed the album for Allmusic and awarded it three stars, commenting that "The second of pianist George Shearing's full-length Latin albums once again finds his quintet...being joined by the exciting congas of Armando Peraza Most of the easy-listening melodies are from south of the border, but even the ones that aren't (such as "The Story of Love," "The Moon Was Yellow" and "It's Not for Me to Say") are given a Latinized treatment. This is nice (if rather safe) music...".

Latin Lace and Shearing's 1959 album Latin Affair were featured in Tom Moon's 2008 book 1,000 Recordings to Hear Before You Die.

== Track listing ==
1. "The Story of Love" (Carlos Eleta Almarán) – 2:29
2. "Serenata" (Leroy Anderson, Mitchell Parish) – 2:44
3. "Tu, Mi Delirio" (César Portillo De La Luz) – 2:04
4. "Cali Mambo" (Dante Varela) – 2:48
5. "Rondo" (Carlos Federico) – 2:50
6. "To the Ends of the Earth" (Joe Sherman, Noel Sherman) – 2:43
7. "The Moon was Yellow (and the Night was Young)" (Fred E. Ahlert, Edgar Leslie) – 2:40
8. "Wonder Struck" (Nick DiStefano) – 2:31
9. "Sand in My Shoes" (Frank Loesser, Victor Schertzinger) – 2:07
10. "Mambo Caribe" (Federico) – 2:58
11. "It's Not for Me to Say" (Robert Allen, Al Stillman) – 1:48
12. "Mambo No. 2" (Torrie Zito) – 2:43

== Personnel ==
- George Shearing – piano
- Toots Thielemans – guitar
- Al McKibbon – double bass
- Armando Peraza – congas
- Emil Richards – vibraphone
- Percy Brice – drums
- Dave Cavanaugh – producer
