= White Satin =

Studio album by George Shearing
- Released: 1960
- Recorded: 1960
- Genre: Jazz
- Label: Capitol ST 1334
- Producer: David Cavanaugh

George Shearing chronology
The Shearing Touch (1960)	White Satin (1960)	Latin Affair (1960)

Professional ratings
Review scores
Source	Rating
Allmusic	3/5 stars

White Satin is a 1960 studio album by the George Shearing quintet and orchestra, arranged by Billy May.

== Track listing ==
1. "Your Name Is Love" (Gene de Paul, Charles Rinker)
2. "Dream" (Johnny Mercer)
3. "Laura" (David Raksin, Mercer)
4. "There's a Small Hotel" (Richard Rodgers, Lorenz Hart)
5. "Old Folks" (Willard Robison, Dedette Lee Hill)
6. "Blue Malibu" (George Shearing, Bill Hegner)

Side 2:

1. "How Long Has This Been Going On?" (George Gershwin, Ira Gershwin)
2. "Love's Melody" (McRae, Swanston)
3. "An Affair to Remember" (Harry Warren, Leo McCarey)
4. "There'll Be Another Spring" (Peggy Lee, Hubie Wheeler)
5. "Moonlight Becomes You" (Jimmy Van Heusen, Johnny Burke)
6. "I'll Take Romance" (Ben Oakland, Oscar Hammerstein II)

== Personnel ==
- George Shearing – piano
- Billy May – arranger

== Trivia ==
The cover of the UK release of this LP appears in The Beatles' 1964 film A Hard Day's Night at the very beginning of a hotel room scene, in black and white, as was the rest of that movie. A bit of jazzy piano is heard as the album cover is displayed, but it's not from this record, but rather from Paul McCartney, who's noodling around on a piano in the hotel room.
