= The Late, Late Show (album) =

Studio album by Dakota Staton
- Released: 1957
- Recorded: February 28 & March 2, 1957
- Genre: Vocal jazz
- Label: Capitol

Dakota Staton chronology
The Late, Late Show (1957)	In the Night (1958)

The Late, Late Show is the debut album of American jazz singer Dakota Staton. The album was released on Capitol Records in 1957. The album contained Staton's greatest hit, "The Late, Late Show".

== Reception ==
Professional ratings
Review scores
Source	Rating
Disc	5/5 stars

AllMusic critic Scott Yanow awarded the album with four and a half stars out of five, saying:

"Singer Dakota Staton's first full-length album was one of her best. She had a hit with "The Late, Late Show" and performed memorable versions of "Broadway," "A Foggy Day," "What Do You See in Her," "My Funny Valentine" and "Moon Ray." Backed by a largely unidentified orchestra arranged by Van Alexander (with Hank Jones on piano), Staton sounds both youthful and mature, displaying a highly appealing voice on a near-classic set."

In terms of chart performance, The Late, Late Show peaked at #4 in the U.S., an unusual feat at a time when jazz records enjoyed more moderate chart action. The book 100 Best-Selling Albums of the 50s lists this album as the 88th best-selling LP released in that decade.

== Track listing ==
=== Side One ===
1. "Broadway" (Billy Byrd, Teddy McRae, Henri Woode) - 2:50
2. "Trust in Me" (Ned Wever, Jean Schwartz, Milton Ager) - 2:44
3. "Summertime" (George Gershwin, DuBose Heyward) - 2:10
4. "Misty" (Erroll Garner, Johnny Burke) - 2:35
5. "A Foggy Day" (George Gershwin, Ira Gershwin) - 2:18
6. "What Do You See in Her?" (Frank Weldon, Hal David) - 2:36

=== Side Two ===
1. "The Late, Late Show" (Murray Berlin, Roy Alfred) - 2:34
2. "My Funny Valentine" (Richard Rodgers, Lorenz Hart) - 2:44
3. "Give Me the Simple Life" (Rube Bloom, Harry Ruby) - 2:16
4. "You Showed Me the Way" (Ella Fitzgerald, Bud Green, Teddy McRae, Chick Webb) - 2:48
5. "Moon Ray" (Artie Shaw, Paul Madison, Arthur Quenzer) - 2:42
6. "Ain't No Use" (Leroy Kirland, Sidney Wyche) - 2:40
