= The Shearing Touch =

Studio album by George Shearing
- Released: 1960
- Recorded: 1960
- Genre: Jazz
- Length: 42:05
- Label: Capitol ST 1472
- Producer: Dave Cavanaugh

George Shearing chronology
Beauty and the Beat! (1960)	The Shearing Touch (1960)	White Satin (1960)

Professional ratings
Review scores
Source	Rating
AllMusic	3/5 stars
The Rolling Stone Jazz Record Guide	3/5 stars

The Shearing Touch is a 1960 album by the George Shearing quintet and orchestra, arranged by Billy May.

The AllMusic reviewer commented on the album containing "unorthodox time signatures, incorporating classical techniques, as well as using light pop melodies, accents, and subtle rhythms".

== Track listing ==
1. "Autumn Nocturne" (Josef Myrow, Kim Gannon) – 2:42
2. "Nola" (Felix Arndt, James Burns) – 2:28
3. "Misty" (Erroll Garner, Johnny Burke) – 2.41
4. "Canadian Sunset" (Eddie Heywood, Norman Gimbel) – 2:56
5. "Autumn Leaves" (Joseph Kosma, Johnny Mercer, Jacques Prévert) – 2:29
6. "Like Young" (André Previn) – 2:44
7. "Sunrise Serenade" (Frankie Carle, Jack Lawrence) – 3:01
8. "Honeysuckle Rose" (Fats Waller, Andy Razaf) – 2:25
9. "Snowfall" (Claude Thornhill) – 2:05
10. "Tonight We Love" (Bobby Worth) – 2:20
11. "Bewitched, Bothered and Bewildered" (Richard Rodgers, Lorenz Hart) – 2:32
12. "One O'Clock Jump" (Count Basie) – 2:10

== Personnel ==
- George Shearing – piano
- Billy May – arranger
