= Broadway (1940 song) =

1940 jazz song

"Broadway" is a 1940 jazz standard written by Wilbur H. Bird, Teddy McRae, and Henri Woode. It was popularized and long associated with the Count Basie Orchestra. Other recordings were made by The Gerry Mulligan sextet, The Gerry Mulligan Concert Jazz Band, Stanley Turrentine, Art Pepper, Hampton Hawes, Ahmad Jamal, Harry "Sweets" Edison, Richard "Groove" Holmes, Dexter Gordon, Tal Farlow and others. While not included in the original, recent editions of the Real Book now include this song amongst other popular jazz tunes.

Vocal versions include those by Dakota Staton (The Late, Late Show 1957), Mel Torme (Mel Tormé Sings Sunday in New York & Other Songs About New York 1963) and Diana Krall (Only Trust Your Heart 1995).

== See also ==
- List of jazz standards
