= Out of the Woods (George Shearing album) =

Studio album by George Shearing
- Released: 1965
- Recorded: 1964
- Studio: Capitol (Hollywood)
- Genre: Jazz
- Label: Capitol ST 2272
- Producer: Dave Cavanaugh

George Shearing chronology
Jazz Concert (1963)	Out of the Woods (1965)	Old Gold and Ivory (1964)

Out of the Woods is a 1965 album by George Shearing accompanied by his quintet featuring compositions written and arranged by Gary Burton.

Shearing had suggested to Burton that he write a composition in counterpoint, which became "J.S. Bop", Shearing was so pleased with the piece that he asked Burton to write several more for a new recording. This was the first time that Capitol Records had allowed Shearing to record original compositions instead of jazz standards.

Burton described the album in his autobiography, Learning to Listen, as his "most ambitious effort at composing and arranging". He assumed that writing for the alto flute would be similar to the alto saxophone, but finding that it wasn't Paul Horn switched from the alto flute to the alto saxophone and "played softly enough to blend in with the other woodwinds".

== Reception ==
Professional ratings
Review scores
Source	Rating
Allmusic	3/5 stars

The initial Billboard review from February 27, 1965 said that "George Shearing gets the billing here but it really is Gary Burton's album...[Burton] composed and arranged this package and in both departments he's an ace". The album was one of Billboards 'Spotlight Picks' for the week.

Scott Yanow reviewed the album for Allmusic and wrote that "Quite a few of the pieces are influenced by classical music, Burton performs on the lyre on "Lyric Ballad"; Shearing doubles a bit on harpsichord...None of the pieces would catch on, and there is a lightweight feel to much of the music, but there are some interesting moments too. Definitely a unique entry in the discography of Gary Burton. "

== Track listing ==
1. "J.S. Bop" – 2:27
2. "Lovely Lyca" – 2:52
3. "Six-Nix-Quix-Flix" – 2:42
4. "Chorale" – 2:45
5. "Doblado Samba" – 2:38
6. "The Great Fugue" – 2:43
7. "Singing Song" – 2:02
8. "Opus For Mozart" – 3:03
9. "Drum Fugue" – 2:09
10. "Lyric Ballad" – 3:38
11. "Improvisation On Fugue X" – 3:40
12. "Dialogue For Two Pianos" – 2:22

== Personnel ==
- George Shearing - piano, harpsichord
- Gary Burton - vibraphone, piano, lyre, arranger
- Abe Most, Jules Jacobs, Justin Gordon, Paul Horn - woodwind
- John Gray - guitar
- Gene Cherico, Ralph Peña - double bass
- Shelly Manne - drums
- Dave Cavanaugh - production

Recorded in Los Angeles, May 1964.
