= Music to Hear =

Studio album by George Shearing
- Released: 1972
- Recorded: 1972
- Genre: Jazz
- Length: 42:05
- Label: Sheba Records ST 106
- Producer: Trixie Shearing

George Shearing chronology
As Requested (1972)	Music to Hear (1972)	The George Shearing Quartet (1972)

Professional ratings
Review scores
Source	Rating
Allmusic	4/5 stars

Music to Hear is a 1972 solo studio album by George Shearing, one of five albums that Shearing released on his own record label, Sheba.

The title comes from Shakespeare's sonnet 08, "Music to hear, why hear'st thou music sadly?"

== Track listing ==
1. "Taking a Chance on Love" (Vernon Duke, Ted Fetter, John La Touche) – 2:06
2. "The Summer Knows" (Michel Legrand, Alan Bergman, Marilyn Bergman) – 3:34
3. "Children's Waltz" – 2:36
4. "Change Partners" (Irving Berlin) – 4:26
5. "Wave" (Antonio Carlos Jobim) – 4:45
6. "What Kind of Fool Am I?" (Leslie Bricusse, Anthony Newley) – 3:54
7. "(Where Do I Begin?) Love Story" (Francis Lai, Carl Sigman) – 3:09
8. "Dream Dancing" (Cole Porter) – 3:35
9. "I Predict" – 2:58
10. "This Is All I Ask" (Gordon Jenkins) – 3:27
11. "Beautiful Love" – 3:36
12. "Alfie" (Burt Bacharach, Hal David) – 5:38

== Personnel ==
- George Shearing – piano
