= Black Satin =

Studio album by George Shearing
- Released: 1956
- Recorded: 1956
- Genre: Jazz
- Length: 42:05
- Label: Capitol ST 858
- Producer: Dave Cavanaugh

George Shearing chronology
| Latin Escapade (1956) | Black Satin (1956) | Velvet Carpet (1956) |

Professional ratings
Review scores
| Source | Rating |
|---|---|
| Allmusic | 4.5/5 stars |
| The Rolling Stone Jazz Record Guide | 2/5 stars |

Black Satin is a 1956 studio album by the George Shearing Quintet, arranged by Billy May.

The initial Billboard magazine review from November 3, 1958 chose the album as one of its "Spotlight Winners of the Week" and commented that "Shearing's tasteful, delicate pianistics and the easy swinging jazz-flavor of the entire album".

== Track listing ==
1. "The Folks Who Live On the Hill" (Jerome Kern, Oscar Hammerstein II) – 7:19
2. "If I Should Lose You" (Leo Robin, Ralph Rainger) – 8:18
3. "Starlight Souvenirs" (Ted Shapiro, Lewis Ilda, Reg Connelly) – 5:15
4. "What Is There to Say" (Vernon Duke, Yip Harburg) – 9:14
5. "Black Satin" (George Shearing) – 5:35
6. "You Don't Know What Love Is" (Don Raye, Gene de Paul) – 6:47
7. "Nothing Ever Changes My Love For You" (Marvin Fisher, Jack Segal) – 4:03
8. "One Morning In May" (Hoagy Carmichael, Mitchell Parish) – 6:00
9. "Moon Song" (Arthur Johnston, Sam Coslow) – 5:02
10. Medley: "As Long as I Live"/"Let's Live Again" (Harold Arlen, Ted Koehler)/(Milt Raskin, Shearing) – 7:44

== Personnel ==
- George Shearing – piano
- Billy May – arranger
