= Shearing Bossa Nova =

Studio album by George Shearing
- Released: 1963
- Recorded: 17–19 December 1962
- Genre: Jazz, Bossa nova
- Label: Capitol ST 1873

George Shearing chronology
Concerto for My Love (1962)	Shearing Bossa Nova (1963)	Touch Me Softly (1963)

Shearing Bossa Nova is a 1963 album by George Shearing accompanied by "woodwinds and a Brazilian rhythm", and arranged by Clare Fischer.

== Reception ==
Professional ratings
Review scores
Source	Rating
Allmusic	4/5 stars

Stephen Cook reviewed the album for Allmusic and wrote that "On the heels of wildly popular and PR department-treated mambo ventures like Latin Escapade and Latin Lace, Shearing took on the bossa nova craze of the early '60s with this long player...Shearing fans certainly will find a lot here to enjoy. Highlights include the Fischer originals "Samba da Borboleta" and "Pensativa." "

== Track listing ==
1. "One Note Samba" (Antonio Carlos Jobim, Newton Mendonça, Jon Hendricks) - 2:43
2. "Blue Prelude" - 2:30
3. "Desafinado" (Jobim, Mendonça) - 2:18
4. "Nevermore" - 3:08
5. "Samba Da Borboleta (Butterfly Samba)" (Clare Fischer) - 2:21
6. "Pensativa" (Fischer) - 2:44
7. "On Green Dolphin Street" (Bronisław Kaper, Ned Washington) - 2:33
8. "Come Rain or Come Shine" (Harold Arlen, Johnny Mercer) - 2:56
9. "Manhã de Carnaval (Morning of the Carnival)" (Luiz Bonfá, Antônio Maria) - 2:17
10. "Algo Novo" - 3:10
11. "Black Satin" - 3:53
12. "Amazona's Legend" - 2:38

== Personnel ==
- George Shearing - piano
- Clare Fischer - arranger, conducting
- Tom Morgan - producer
