= Margie Hyams =

American jazz vibraphonist, pianist, and arranger (1920–2012)

Marjorie Hyams
- Born: August 9, 1920
- Died: June 14, 2012 (aged 91)
- Genres: Jazz; modal jazz; third stream; cool jazz; post-bop
- Occupations: Musician; arranger
- Instruments: Vibraphone; piano
- Years active: 1940–1970

Marjorie Hyams (August 9, 1920 – June 14, 2012) was an American jazz vibraphonist, pianist, and arranger. She began her career as a vibraphonist in the 1940s, playing with Woody Herman, the Hip Chicks, Mary Lou Williams, Charlie Ventura, and George Shearing. She also led her own groups.

== Career ==
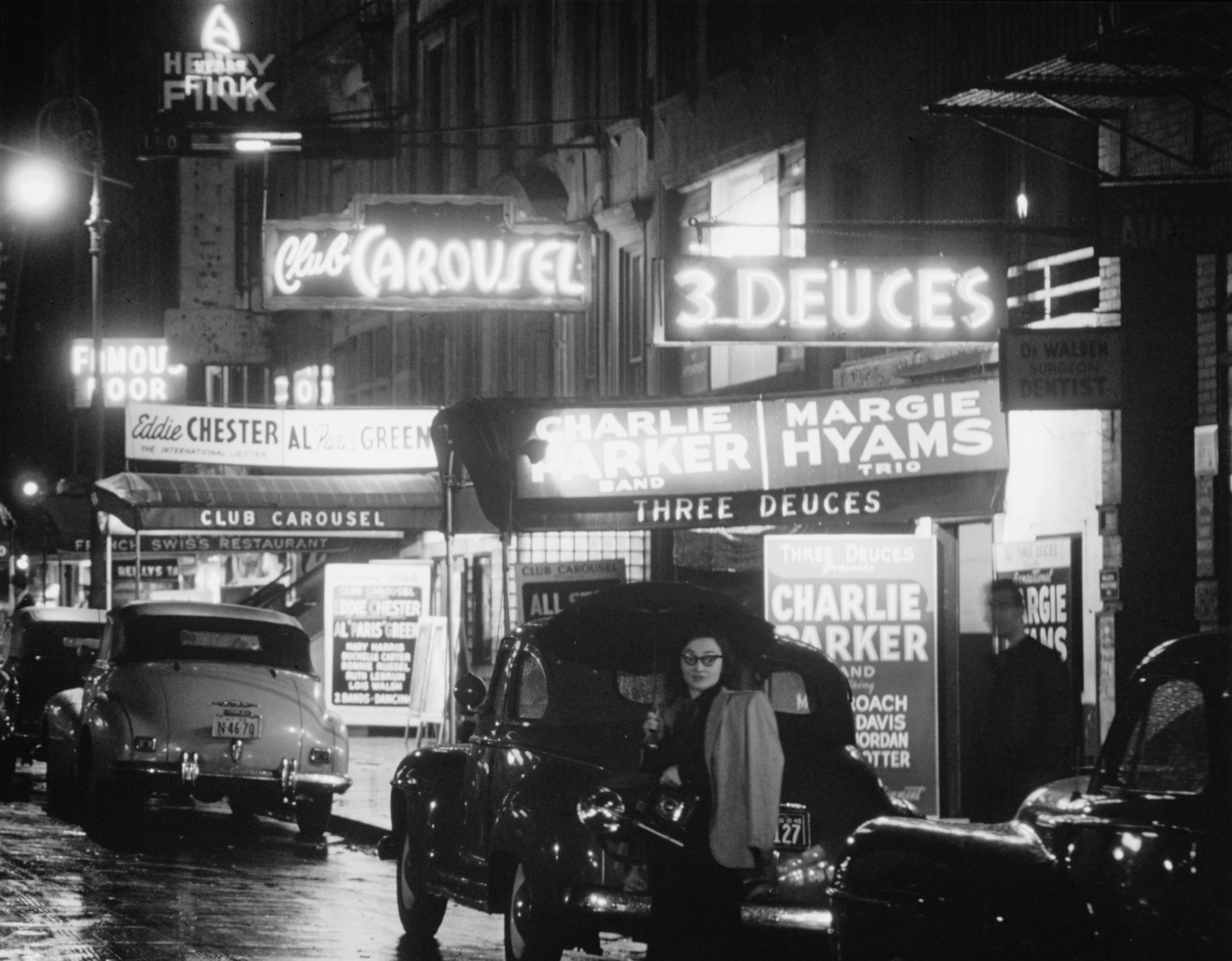
South side of 52nd Street, New York, between 5th & 6th Avenues — looking east (c. 1948). Notice the Margie Hyams Trio on the marquee at the Three Deuces jazz club. Photo: William P. Gottlieb, United States Library of Congress's Music Division

Hyams had her own trio and quartet from 1940 to 1944, and played with Woody Herman and Flip Phillips in the mid-1940s. In 1945, she played with the all-female band Hip Chicks and, with guitarists such as Tal Farlow, Mundell Lowe, and Billy Bauer, formed another trio that performed on Manhattan's 52nd Street until 1948. In 1946, she arranged and sang with Charlie Ventura and recorded with Mary Lou Williams. Hyams joined George Shearing from 1949 to 1950.

=== Woody Herman ===
Jack Siefert, a lifelong friend of Woody Herman, introduced Hyams to Herman, who had broken convention in 1941 by hiring female trumpeter Billie Rogers. Hyams was one of Herman's vibraphonist alumni that included Terry Gibbs, Red Norvo, and Milt Jackson, all of whom, according to jazz author Doug Ramsey, were elite musicians.

Later reflecting on her time with Herman's First Herd, Hyams said:

In a sense, you weren't really looked upon as a musician, especially in clubs. There was more interest in what you were going to wear or how your hair was fixed — they just wanted you to look attractive, ultra feminine, largely because you were doing something they didn't consider feminine. Most of the time I fought it and didn't listen to them. Only in retrospect, when you start looking back and analyzing, you can see the obstacles that were put in front of you. I just thought at the time that I was too young to handle it, but now I see that it was really rampant chauvinism.

=== George Shearing ===
Hyams was a founding member (1949/50) of the popular George Shearing Quintet, which introduced a new and much-imitated ensemble sound in small group modern jazz. In his autobiography, Shearing called Hyams a "very fine musician" and a "thoroughly schooled classical pianist". He said they "got on very well" and acknowledged her contribution of November Seascape and other original compositions. He added that when she left the group, he thought she had "just got tired of working for someone else and traveling so much, even though she was drawing a good salary".

== Personal life ==
Hyams was born August 9, 1920, in New York and grew up in Jamaica, Queens. Her brother, Mark Hyams (1914–2007), was a jazz pianist who played with big bands, including those of Will Hudson (mid-1930s) and Spud Murphy (late-1930s).

Hyams married William G. "Bill" Ericsson (1927–1978) on June 6, 1950, in Chicago, Illinois. From 1951 to 1970, she played, taught, and arranged in Chicago. Margie and Bill had three children: Lisa, Kristin (deceased), and Tod.

Hyams died June 14, 2012, in Arcadia, California.

The media, marquees, and promos often spelled her first name "Margie", but she insisted that it was spelled with a "j".

== Selected discography ==
Releases
Woody Herman
CBS’s Old Gold Show Rehearsal, New York, September 27, 1944
- 1-2-3-4 jump (Woodchoppers)
Hindsight 134, Jazz Unlimited (Denmark) 201-2085 CD
- Is You Is or Is You Ain't My Baby
Hindsight 134, Jazz Unlimited (Denmark) 201-2085 CD
- Noah

Flip Phillips Fliptet
New York, October 2, 1944
Neal Hefti (trumpet), Bill Harris (trombone), Aaron Sachs (clarinet), Flip Phillips (tenor sax), Marjorie Hyams (vibraphone), Ralph Burns (piano), Billy Bauer (guitar), Chubby Jackson (bass), Dave Tough (drums)
S1: Skyscraper (Hyams not on this cut)
Signature 28106, Bob Thiele BBM1-1032, RCA (F) FXM3-7324
S2: Pappilloma
Signature 28106, Bob Thiele BBM1-1032
S3: A melody from the sky
Signature 28119, Br 80175, Bob Thiele BBM1-1032, RCA (F) FXM3-7324
S4: 1-2-3-4 jump (Woodchoppers)
Shelton 1201, Bob Thiele BBM1-1032
Notes: Bob Thiele BBM1-1032 titled "A melody from the sky." All above titles also on Doctor Jazz FW39419 titled "A melody from the sky" and Sony Music AK39419 CD titled "A melody from the sky"; see following sessions to late November 1945 for rest of CD.
Woody Herman
CBS’s Old Gold Show Rehearsal, New York, October 4, 1944
- Apple Honey
Hindsight 134
Woody Herman
AFRS Downbeat 141; possibly from CBS’s Old Gold Shows, New York, August – September 1944
- Perdido
Jazum 55, First Heard (United Kingdom) FH36
- Apply honey (arr. by Ralph Burns)
"
- Always (Frances Wayne, vocal)
"
- Noah (Woody Herman, vocal; arranged by Ralph Burns)
"
- Half past jumpin' time (arranged by Neal Hefti)
  (aka Jones Beachhead)
"
- Two again (Frances Wayne, vocal)
Jazum 56, First Heard (United Kingdom) FH36
- Golden wedding
"
- Four or five times (Woody Herman Band, vocals)
"
Notes: All titles on Solid Sender (Germany) SOL506<
Woody Herman
AFRS One Night Stand 396 Broadcast, Hollywood Palladium, Hollywood, California, October 17, 1944
- Who dat up dere?
Jass JCD621 CD
- Let me love you tonight (Frances Wayne, vocal)
"
- 'Tain't me (Woody Herman, vocal)
"
- Time waits for no one (Frances Wayne, vocal; es arr)
"
- I've got you under my skin (arranged by Ralph Burns)
"
- Somebody loves me (Woody Herman, vocal)
"
- Come out, come out, wherever you are, (Frances Wayne, vocal)
"
- Woodchopper's ball
"
- Theme
"
Notes: Opening night, during the band's stay in Hollywood they filmed Earl Carroll's Vanities for Republic Pictures in which they played Apple Honey (only the first half of the number is audible in the final print)

Source: Tom Lord Discography (2012)
