= On the Sunny Side of the Strip =

Live album by George Shearing
- Released: 1960
- Recorded: 1958, Cresendo Club, Sunset Strip, Los Angeles
- Genre: Jazz
- Length: 42:05
- Label: Capitol ST 1416
- Producer: Dave Cavanaugh

George Shearing chronology
Latin Affair (1960)	On the Sunny Side of the Strip (1960)	George Shearing and the Montgomery Brothers (1961)

Professional ratings
Review scores
Source	Rating
Allmusic	4/5 stars

On the Sunny Side of the Strip is a 1960 live album by the George Shearing quintet, one of five live albums recorded by the quintet.

== Track listing ==
1. "Jordu" (Duke Jordan) – 4:10
2. "As I Love You" (Ray Evans, Jay Livingston) – 3:15
3. "Confirmation" (Charlie Parker) – 4:25
4. "The Nearness of You" (Hoagy Carmichael, Ned Washington) – 3:40
5. "Mambo Inn" (Mario Bauzá, Edgar Sampson, Bobby Woodlen) – 3:09
6. "Bernie's Tune" (Leiber and Stoller, Bernard Miller) – 3:25
7. "Some Other Spring" (Arthur Herzog Jr., Irene Kitchings) – 3:45
8. "Joy Spring" (Clifford Brown) – 4:25
9. "Drume Negrita" (Eliseo Grenet, Ernesto Wood Grenet) – 6:43

== Personnel ==
- George Shearing - piano
- Emil Richards - vibraphone
- Toots Thielemans - guitar
- Al McKibbon - double bass
- Percy Brice - drums
- Armando Peraza - congas
