= George Shearing in Dixieland =

Studio album by George Shearing
- Released: 1989
- Recorded: 1989
- Genre: Jazz
- Label: Concord CJ 388
- Producer: Carl Jefferson

George Shearing chronology
A Perfect Match (1988)	George Shearing in Dixieland (1989)	Piano (1989)

George Shearing in Dixieland is a 1988 album by jazz pianist George Shearing of music associated with Dixieland.

== Reception ==
Professional ratings
Review scores
Source	Rating
Allmusic	1.5/5 stars

Scott Yanow reviewed the album for Allmusic and wrote that "This promising effort is a major disappointment. ...Shearing planned to revisit his roots in Dixieland and swing but he hedged his bets. Despite having an impressive septet...Shearing wrote out most of the ensembles, taking away from the spontaneity and potential excitement of the music. Despite the interesting repertoire (ranging from "Truckin'," "Honeysuckle Rose" and "Jazz Me Blues" to "Take Five," "Desafinado" and even a Dixiefied "Lullaby Of Birdland"), this date falls far short of its potential".

== Track listing ==
1. "Clap Yo' Hands" (George Gershwin, Ira Gershwin) – 3:55
2. "Mighty Like the Blues" (Leonard Feather) – 2:45
3. "Truckin'" (Rube Bloom, Ted Koehler) – 3:57
4. "Fascinating Rhythm" (G. Gershwin, I. Gershwin) – 3:10
5. "Destination Moon" (Roy Alfred, Marvin Fisher) – 4:49
6. "New Orleans" (Hoagy Carmichael) – 3:27
7. "Soon" (G. Gershwin, I. Gershwin) – 3:11
8. "Take Five" (Paul Desmond) – 3:23
9. "Lullaby of Birdland" (George Shearing, George David Weiss) – 4:19
10. "Jazz Me Blues" (Tom Delaney) – 3:38
11. "Blue Monk" (Thelonious Monk) – 7:00
12. "Desafinado" (Antônio Carlos Jobim, Newton Mendonça) – 4:12
13. "Honeysuckle Rose" (Andy Razaf, Fats Waller) – 3:33
14. "Alice In Dixieland" – 8:39

== Personnel ==
- George Shearing – piano
- Kenny Davern – clarinet
- Warren Vaché – cornet
- Ken Peplowski – tenor saxophone
- George Masso – trombone
- Neil Swainson – double bass
- Jerry Fuller – drums

Production

- Phil Edwards – engineer
- Leonard Feather – liner notes
- George Horn – mastering
- Carl Jefferson – producer
- Sandi Young – art direction
- Ollie Cotton, Stan Wallace – assistant engineer
- Michael McDonald – engineer, remixing
