= Larry Novak =

American musician (1933–2020)

- Born: Lawrence R. Novak; May 18, 1933; Chicago, Illinois, United States
- Died: August 2, 2020 (aged 87)
- Genres: Jazz
- Occupation: Pianist
- Instrument: Piano
- Years active: 1947–present
- Labels: Dot, Delmark

Lawrence R. Novak (May 18, 1933 – August 2, 2020) was an American jazz pianist. He was the father of drummer Gary Novak.

Larry Novak was born in Chicago. He learned piano from age five and began playing jazz at 14. He studied at Loyola University Chicago and the University of Minnesota, followed by a stint playing in a military band in 1959-60. Novak led a trio ensemble at the London House in Chicago from 1961 to 1963 and then at Mr. Kelly's from 1963 to 1975, a gig he inherited from Marty Rubenstein. He was the musical director there for 12 years. During this time, he released the album Larry Novak Plays! on Dot Records, issued in 1964 with Count Basie bassist, Cleveland Eaton. Novak accompanied on piano, conducted, and arranged for Peggy Lee and worked extensively with Pearl Bailey; he also accompanied on piano, conducted, and arranged for Mel Tormé, Frank Sinatra, Joe Williams, Sarah Vaughan, Tony Bennett, Natalie Cole, and Carmen McRae. Among the instrumentalists he played with are Dizzy Gillespie, Louie Bellson, Herb Ellis, Butch Miles, Rufus Reid, Ray Brown, Carl Fontana, Kenny Burrell, Chick Corea, Al Hirt, Charlie Shavers, Barney Kessel, Scott LaFaro, Sonny Stitt, Terry Gibbs, Buddy DeFranco, Phil Woods, Judy Roberts, and Scott Hamilton.

From 1984, Novak taught at DePaul University.

Novak's Invitation album featuring bassist Eric Hochberg and drummer Rusty Jones was released by Delmark Records in November 2015.

== Discography ==
Solo

- Larry Novak Plays! (1964)
- Invitation (2015)

With others

- Songs, Rhythms and Chants for the Dance - Ella Jenkins (1977)
- Tribute to Benny Goodman: Memories of You - Terry Gibbs (1991)
- Chip off the Old Bop, Buddy DeFranco - (1992)
- Kings of Swing - Terry Gibbs (1992)
- Live at the Jazz Showcase - Louie Bellson (1992)
- Basic Reeding - Lucy Reed (1994)
- The Ultimate Christmas - The Chicago Hitmen (1995)
- Air Bellson - Louie Bellson (1997)
- Nobody Else But Me - Marc Pompe (1997)
- Positive Settings - Rick Holland (1998)
- The Concord Jazz Heritage Series - Louie Bellson (1998)
- A New Set of Standards - Spider Saloff (1999)
- First Steps - Bob Lark (1999)
- In the Forefront - Bobby Lewis (2000)
- You Talkin' to Me?! - Von Freeman (2000)
- Live at the Green Mill - Frank Catalano (2001)
