= George Shearing & Barry Tuckwell Play the Music of Cole Porter =

Studio album by George Shearing
- Released: 1986
- Recorded: January 1986
- Genre: Jazz
- Label: Concord CC 2010
- Producer: Carl Jefferson

George Shearing chronology
Grand Piano (1986)	George Shearing & Barry Tuckwell Play the Music of Cole Porter (1986)	More Grand Piano (1985)

George Shearing & Barry Tuckwell Play the Music of Cole Porter is a 1986 album of the music of Cole Porter by jazz pianist George Shearing and classical French horn player Barry Tuckwell. The pair play as a duet on four selections, two are performed as a quartet with bass and drums, and the remaining five are accompanied by a small orchestra of string players. All arrangements are by Shearing.

== Reception ==
Professional ratings
Review scores
Source	Rating
Allmusic	3/5 stars
The Penguin Guide to Jazz Recordings	2/4 stars

Scott Yanow reviewed the album for Allmusic and wrote that "In general Tuckwell does not improvise but Shearing's arrangements give a jazz feel to all of the performances and make the music accessible (if not really essential) to both classical and jazz listeners".

== Track listing ==
1. "I Concentrate on You" – 4:58 (orchestra)
2. "Everything I Love" – 2:54 (quartet)
3. "I've Got You Under My Skin" – 4:43 (duet)
4. "Easy to Love" – 2:19 (orchestra)
5. "In the Still of the Night" – 2:45 (duet)
6. "Every Time We Say Goodbye" – 4:00 (orchestra)
7. "But in the Morning, No" – 2:41 (quartet)
8. "So in Love" – 5:32 (orchestra)
9. "After You" – 4:27 (duet)
10. "All Through the Night" – 3:55 (orchestra)
11. "Do I Love You?" – 5:16 (duet)

All compositions by Cole Porter

== Personnel ==
- George Shearing – piano, liner notes, arranger
- Barry Tuckwell – french horn, liner notes
- Guildhall String Ensemble
- Harry Lookofsky, Frederick Buldrini, Lewis Eley, Maura Giannini, Carmel Malin, Joseph Malin, Louann Montesi – violin
- Seymour Barab, Avron Coleman, Frederick Zlotkin – cello
- Mike Renzi – conductor
- John Clayton, Don Thompson – double bass
- Grady Tate – drums, percussion
- Ed Trabanco – engineer
- Carl Jefferson – producer
