= Brian Torff =

American jazz musician (born 1954)

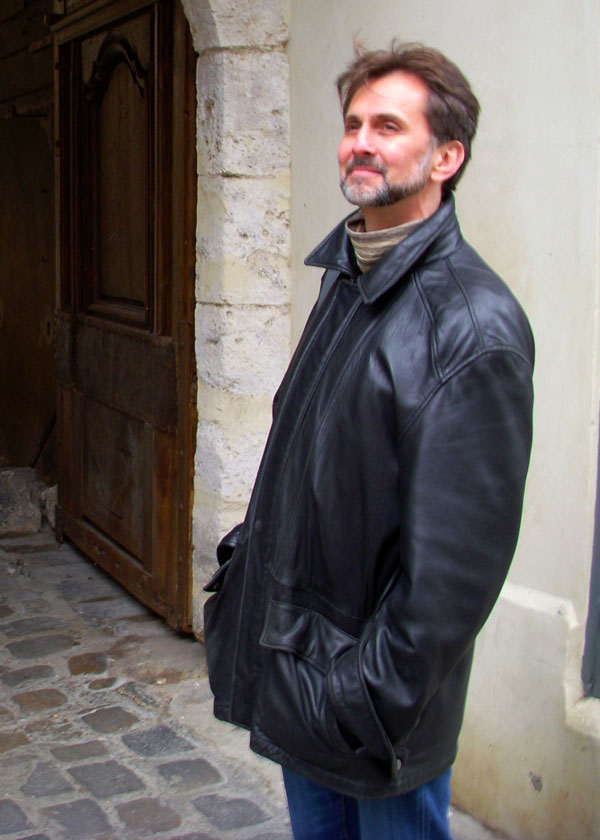

Background information
- Born: March 16, 1954 (age 72); Chicago, Illinois, U.S.
- Genres: Jazz, jazz fusion, delta electric
- Occupations: Musician, educator
- Instruments: Double-bass, harmonica, vocals, keyboard, slide guitar
- Website: briantorff.com

Brian Q. Torff (born March 16, 1954) is an American jazz double-bassist, songwriter and composer.

== Career ==
=== Teacher ===
Brian Q. Torff is a Professor of Music and the director of the music program at Fairfield University in Fairfield, Connecticut. He has taught at New York University and makes frequent appearances at the Regina A. Quick Center for the Arts leading the Fairfield University Jazz Ensemble along with guest jazz artists including Randy Brecker, Bob Mintzer, Bernard Purdie, Milt Hinton, Dave Samuels and Paul Wertico.

=== Performer ===
Brian Q.Torff is a bassist, songwriter, composer and educator. His album, 'Run With Scissors,' features his music in a 'Delta Electric' style, combining vintage southern style instruments with drum machines. Torff has performed as a featured bass soloist leading his own trio and has appeared at Lincoln Center, the Hollywood Bowl, the Kennedy Center and Birdland in New York City. Torff performed at Carnegie Hall for Fiddle Fest, where he appeared with Mark O'Connor, Dave Grusin, Regina Carter, Yo-Yo Ma, Itzhak Perlman, and Pinchas Zukerman. He served as co-chair person for the music advisory board for the National Endowment for the Arts in 1992.

Brian Torff's professional career began in 1974 when bassist Milt Hinton offered him the opportunity of touring with Cleo Laine. During the late 70s, Torff recorded and performed with pianists Mary Lou Williams and Marian McPartland, and toured Australia, New Zealand, and Hong Kong with jazz violinist Stéphane Grappelli. He played in pianist Erroll Garner's last group and worked in the big bands of Oliver Nelson, and The Thad Jones/Mel Lewis Orchestra.

In 1979, Brian Torff joined in a duo with pianist George Shearing. In the course of their three-and-a-half-year collaboration, they toured throughout the U.S., Europe, Brazil, and South Africa and were featured on The Tonight Show, The Merv Griffin Show, and their own PBS special from the Cafe Carlyle in New York City. They received worldwide acclaim and were invited to perform at the White House in 1982 for President Ronald Reagan. Their third album won a Grammy Award for vocalist Mel Tormé.

=== Composer and author ===
Torff has composed works with George Shearing and Larry Coryell and orchestral scores that have been performed by the Boston Pops, Los Angeles Philharmonic, and the Pittsburgh Symphony. He has appeared as conductor, composer, and clinician for numerous high school and college jazz festivals. He is the author of the book In Love With Voices: A Jazz Memoir (2008), which chronicles his early musical roots and portraits of musicians he has worked with, including Frank Sinatra, Mel Tormé, Erroll Garner, Benny Goodman, Mary Lou Williams, Marian McPartland, Stephane Grappelli, and George Shearing.

== Discography ==
- Run with Scissors (Bassline, 2002)
- Post Authentic World (Brian Q. Torff and New Duke, 2016)
- Life in East Bumblepuck (Bassline, 2006)
- Workin' on a Bassline (Bassline, 1997)
- Manhattan Hoedown (Audiophile, 1998)
- Union (Naim, 1998)
- Hitchhiker of Karoo (Optimism, 1985)

With George Shearing

- On a Clear Day (Concord, 1980)
- Blues Alley Jazz (Concord, 1980)
- An Evening with George Shearing & Mel Tormé (Concord, 1982)

With Sonny Stitt

- Dumpy Mama (Flying Dutchman, 1975)

With Larry Coryell

- The Coryells (Chesky, 2000)
