= Now and Then (Ernestine Anderson album) =

Studio album by Ernestine Anderson
- Released: 1993
- Studio: Vocal jazz
- Label: Qwest
- Producer: Stix Hooper

Ernestine Anderson chronology
Live at the Concord Jazz Festival Third Set (1991)	Now and Then (1993)	Three Ladies of Jazz: Live in New York (1995)

Now and Then is an album by the American musician Ernestine Anderson, released in 1993. It was her first album for Quincy Jones's Qwest Records; Jones had been her high school classmate. The album was nominated for a Grammy Award for "Best Jazz Vocal Performance, Female". Now and Then peaked in the top 10 of Billboard's Jazz Albums chart. Anderson supported it with a North American tour.

== Production ==
The album was produced by Stix Hooper. "Monte Carlo Nights" is a duet with Arnold McCuller. Anderson wrote "Wrong Number" and "Ain't No Easy Way". "A Night in Tunisia" is a version of the Dizzy Gillespie composition. Jim Keltner played drums on the album.

== Critical reception ==
Professional ratings
Review scores
Source	Rating
AllMusic	3/5 stars

Billboard called Anderson "an expressive, natural, and never overbearing stylist." USA Today considered the album to be one of 1993's biggest disappointments, writing that "it's a bewildering kitchen-sink jumble of jazz, blues and bad-sounding pop." The Rocket opined that "Anderson is just too damn good for this bland stuff."

Will Friedwald, in A Biographical Guide to the Great Jazz and Pop Singers, labeled the album "a well-crafted [exercise] in acoustic funk."

== Track listing ==
No.	Title	Length
1.	"Jazz Street"
2.	"A Night in Tunisia"
3.	"One Child"
4.	"This Could Be Dangerous"
5.	"This Can't Be Love"
6.	"Wrong Number"
7.	"Ain't No Easy Way"
8.	"My Funny Valentine"
9.	"Monte Carlo Nights"
10.	"When It All Comes Down"
11.	"I'll Be Seeing You"
