= Live at the Concord Jazz Festival =

Live album by The Ray Brown Trio
- Released: 1979
- Venue: Concord Jazz Festival
- Genre: jazz
- Length: 48:47
- Label: Concord

Live at the Concord Jazz Festival is a 1979 live album recorded at the Concord Jazz Festival by the Ray Brown Trio in August 1979. Singer Ernestine Anderson guest starred.

== Track listing ==
Professional ratings
Review scores
Source	Rating
AllMusic	4/5 stars
The Penguin Guide to Jazz Recordings	3/4 stars

1. "Blue Bossa" - 4:42
2. "Bossa Nova Do Marilla" - 4:04
3. "Manhã de Carnaval" - 6:43
4. "St. Louis Blues" - 4:48
5. "Fly Me To The Moon" - 3:34
6. "Georgia On My Mind" - 5:36
7. "Here's That Rainy Day" - 5:12
8. "Please Send Me Someone To Love" - 5:49
9. "Honeysuckle Rose" - 5:48

== Personnel ==
- Ray Brown - double bass
- Monty Alexander - piano
- Jeff Hamilton - drums
- Ernestine Anderson - vocals
