= New Look! =

Studio album by George Shearing
- Released: 1967
- Recorded: 1967
- Genre: Traditional pop, jazz, middle of the road
- Label: Capitol ST 2637

George Shearing chronology
That Fresh Feeling (1966)	New Look! (1967)	Shearing Today! (1967)

New Look! is a 1967 album by George Shearing accompanied by his quintet and a string orchestra.

== Reception ==
The initial Billboard magazine review from January 21, 1967 commented that "The ever fresh piano magic of Shearing is headed right for the best seller charts with this delightful program of popular melodies...masterful performances with a classical approach".

== Track listing ==
1. "On a Clear Day (You Can See Forever)" (Burton Lane, Alan Jay Lerner) – 2:45
2. "Yesterday" (John Lennon, Paul McCartney) – 2:10
3. "Strangers in the Night" (Bert Kaempfert, Charlie Singleton, Eddie Snyder) – 2:14
4. "Too Good to Be True" (George Shearing) – 2:38
5. "Michelle" (Lennon, McCartney) – 2:55
6. "You're Gonna Hear from Me" (André Previn, Dory Previn) – 2:37
7. "Call Me" (Tony Hatch) – 2:56
8. "The Shadow of Your Smile" (Johnny Mandel, Paul Francis Webster) – 2:45
9. "Have a Heart" (Donald Borzage, Gene DiNovi, Johnny Mercer) – 2:11
10. "What the World Needs Now Is Love" (Burt Bacharach, Hal David) – 2:02
11. "Once in a Lifetime" (Leslie Bricusse, Anthony Newley) – 3:58

== Personnel ==
- George Shearing – piano
- Julian Lee – orchestration
