= Frances Wayne =

American jazz vocalist (1919–1978)

Frances Wayne (born Chiarina Francesca Bertocci or Clara Bertocci, August 26, 1919 – February 6, 1978) was an American jazz vocalist. She was best known for her recording of "Happiness Is Just a Thing Called Joe."

== Early years and career ==
Wayne was born in Boston and graduated from Somerville High School.

She moved to New York City in her teens, where she sang in an ensemble led by her brother, saxophonist Nick Jerret. A 1942 review in Billboard magazine described her as "a striking brunette with a true contralto, perfect rhythm, and, most interesting, a brand-new style...of deep understanding and feeling for the spirit of what she sings."

Early in the 1940s, she recorded with Charlie Barnet's big band, Sam Donahue’s band and in 1943 sang with Woody Herman's band. After her husband, Neal Hefti, formed his own big band in 1947, Wayne soloed in this ensemble as well. She sang with Hefti into the 1950s, and later sang with smaller ensembles, which featured Hank Jones, Milt Hinton, Jerome Richardson, Richie Kamuca, John LaPorta, Billy Bauer, and Al Cohn.

On radio, Wayne was the female vocalist on The Woody Herman Show. She received the 1946 Esquire Award as Best New Female Vocalist.

== Personal life ==
On November 2, 1945, in Somerville, Massachusetts, Wayne married musician Neal Hefti, who played trumpet and arranged material for Herman. They had two children and remained together until her death.

== Death ==
On February 6, 1978, Wayne died in Boston at age 58 after suffering from cancer over an extended period.

== Discography ==
- That Old Black Magic with the Charlie Barnet Orchestra (Decca, 1943)
- The Music Stopped with the Woody Herman Orchestra (Decca, 1944)
- Songs for My Man with the Neal Hefti Orchestra (Epic, 1956)
- Frances Wayne (Brunswick, 1957)
- The Warm Sound of Frances Wayne (Atlantic, 1957)
