= Rusty Jones (musician) =

American jazz drummer

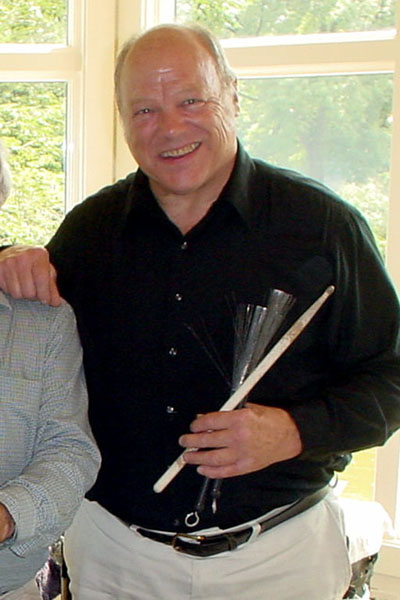

Background information
- Born: Isham Russell Jones II; April 13, 1942; Cedar Rapids, Iowa, U.S.
- Died: December 9, 2015 (aged 73) Chicago, Illinois
- Genres: Jazz
- Occupation: Musician
- Instrument: Drums
- Years active: 1955–2015
- Formerly of: George Shearing, Marian McPartland, Stéphane Grappelli

Isham Russell "Rusty" Jones II (April 13, 1942 – December 9, 2015) was an American jazz drummer.

== Early life ==
Jones began playing drums at the age of thirteen and continued on throughout his college years, choosing traditional and modern jazz as his preferred mode of music. He went "on the road" after graduating college in 1965 from the University of Iowa with a degree in history and political science, to "get it out of his system", but he never stopped his pursuit of a musical vocation. He moved to the Chicago area in 1967.

== Playing career ==
Jones appeared with Chicago singer Judy Roberts from 1968–72, soon after becoming a member of George Shearing's trio from 1972-78. Later years he accompanied pianist Marian McPartland for a few years and then freelanced throughout Chicago with several bands, touring the United States and Europe. He worked quite a bit with Adam Makowicz, Larry Novak, Patricia Barber, Frank D'Rone, Art Hodes, Ira Sullivan, J.R. Monterose, and Stéphane Grappelli.

Jones appeared quite regularly around the Chicago area with musicians from the young jazz scene in Chicago. He died in Chicago on December 9, 2015.

== Notable family members ==
Jones' father was a saxophonist and his mother a vocalist (appearing under the name of Gretchen Lee) with most of their gigs being in and around the Chicago area. His mother was working at the Bismark Hotel in 1936 when the couple married. Other musicians in Jones' family were his grandfather, a trombonist/bandleader named Frank Jones, who worked in the Saginaw and Detroit area and his maternal uncle, Dean Herrick, an early artist on the Hammond organ. The best known of these family musicians was Jones' great uncle, songwriter and band leader Isham Jones.
