= On a Clear Day (George Shearing album) =

Studio album by George Shearing
- Released: 1980
- Recorded: October 1979
- Genre: Jazz
- Length: 39:07
- Label: Concord
- Producer: Carl Jefferson

George Shearing chronology
Two for the Road (1979)	On a Clear Day (1980)	Alone Together (1980)

Professional ratings
Review scores
Source	Rating
Allmusic	4/5 stars
The Rolling Stone Jazz Record Guide	2/5 stars

On a Clear Day is a 1980 studio album by the pianist George Shearing, accompanied by the double bassist Brian Torff.

== Track listing ==
1. Spoken Introduction by George Shearing – 0:27
2. "Love for Sale" (Cole Porter) – 9:32
3. "On a Clear Day (You Can See Forever)" (Burton Lane, Alan Jay Lerner) – 6:13
4. "Brasil '79" (Brian Torff) – 4:55
5. "Don't Explain" (Arthur Herzog Jr., Billie Holiday) – 6:07
6. "Happy Days Are Here Again" (Milton Ager, Jack Yellen) – 2:52
7. "Have You Met Miss Jones?" (Lorenz Hart, Richard Rodgers) – 3:48
8. "Blue Island Blues" (Torff) – 5:04
9. "Lullaby of Birdland" (Shearing, George David Weiss) – 5:31

== Personnel ==
=== Performance ===
- George Shearing – piano
- Brian Torff – double bass
