= Trust in Me (1937 song) =

1937 song

Single by Wayne King & his Orchestra
- B-side: "The Night Is Young And You're So Beautiful"
- Released: January 6, 1937
- Genre: pop
- Length: 2:09
- Label: Victor
- Songwriters: Ned Wever, Milton Ager, Jean Schwartz

"Trust in Me" is a song written by Ned Wever, Milton Ager, and Jean Schwartz. Popular versions in 1937 were by Mildred Bailey and by Wayne King & his Orchestra.

== Popular recordings ==
- It was subsequently revived by Eddie Fisher. His recording was released by RCA Victor Records as catalog number 20-4444. It reached the Billboard magazine Best Seller chart on February 1, 1952, its only week on the chart, at number 29. The flip side was Fisher's much bigger hit, "Tell Me Why".
- Another revival was made by Etta James in 1961 where it peaked on the charts at number 30 on the Hot 100 and number 4 on the Hot R&B Sides chart.

== Other recordings ==
- Connee Boswell - recorded on February 15, 1937, for Decca Records (catalog No. 1161).
- Russ Morgan's Music - recorded on June 1, 1937, for Brunswick Records (catalog No. 7808).
- Freddy Martin's orchestra in 1942.
- Louis Jordan & His Trio - recorded on August 8, 1951, on Decca Records (catalog number 27784).
- Chris Connor - included the tune in her 1957 album I Miss You So.
- Dakota Staton included her version on her 1957 album, The Late, Late Show.
- Patti Page - recorded her version in 1958, peaking at number 43 on the Billboard Hot 100.
- Dinah Washington (1961) - included in the compilation album Dinah Washington – Golden Hits Volume One (1963).
- Harry Nilsson - A Touch More Schmilsson in the Night (1988).
- Beyoncé, for the film soundtrack of Cadillac Records (2008).
