= New Look (band) =

Canadian electronic music band

New Look were a Canadian electronic music duo consisting of husband and wife, Adam Pavao and Sarah Ruba. The band released their first EP How's My Hair? in 2008. Their debut album New Look was recorded in Berlin and released on the record label !K7 on October 10, 2011. It has received critical acclamation from both The Guardian and Vogue. The couple split their time between Toronto, Ontario, Canada where they have a house and studio, and New York City where Ruba works part-time as a model. In 2010, the band toured with English indie pop band The xx.

New Look's music is influenced by 1980s sounds, using keyboards and synthesizers to create what they call "future pop". Their style also incorporates aspects of modern electro, pop, dubstep, soul, and R&B. Ruba admits being influenced by early experiences of singing in a jazz band while in school. Writing the songs is a collaborative effort, both names being credited with authoring, composing and producing. Ruba provides vocals and synths while Pavao plays keyboards and instrumentals.

== Discography ==
- How's My Hair? (EP) (2008)
- New Look (LP) (2011)
