= Milt Raskin =

American swing jazz pianist

- Born: Milton Raskin; January 27, 1916
- Died: October 16, 1977 (aged 61) Manhattan, New York, U.S.
- Genres: Jazz, swing, pop
- Occupations: Musician, composer, arranger
- Instruments: Piano, saxophone

Milt Raskin (January 27, 1916 – October 16, 1977) was an American swing jazz pianist.

== Biography ==
Born in Boston, Mass., Raskin played saxophone as a child before switching to piano at age 11. In the 1930s he attended the New England Conservatory of Music. He worked on local Boston-area radio before moving to New York City, where he played with Wingy Manone in 1937 at the Famous Door and Gene Krupa in 1938-39. He then played with Teddy Powell and Alvino Rey before joining Krupa again for a short time, then joined the orchestra of Tommy Dorsey from 1942 to 1944, replacing Joe Bushkin.

He moved to Los Angeles in 1944, where he occasionally worked in jazz (including on recordings by Artie Shaw, Billie Holiday, and Georgie Auld), but concentrated on work as a studio musician and musical director. Much of his studio work from the 1940s on was uncredited, and he never led his own jazz recording session.

== Discography ==
=== As leader ===
- Kapu (Forbidden) (Crown, 1959)

=== As sideman ===
- Count Basie, Compositions of Count Basie and Others (Crown, 1959)
- Milt Bernhart, The Sound of Bernhart (Decca, 1958)
- Tommy Dorsey, One Night Stand (Sandy Hook, 1976)
- Tommy Dorsey, The Carnegie Hall V-Disc Session April 1944 (Hep, 1990)
- Stan Kenton, Artistry in Voices and Brass (Capitol, 1963)
- Jack Marshall, 18th Century Jazz (Capitol, 1959)
- Skip Martin, 8 Brass, 5 Sax, 4 Rhythm (MGM, 1959)
- Les Paul, Feed Back 1944–1945 (Circle, 1986)

=== As arranger and conductor ===
- Nancy Wilson, Hello Young Lovers (Capitol, 1962)
- George Shearing, Old Gold and Ivory (Capitol, 1964)
