= New Look (album) =

2011 album by New Look

Studio album by New Look
- Genre: Electropop, futurepop
- Length: 46:52
- Label: Studio !K7
- Producer: Adam Pavao, Sarah Ruba

New Look is the self-titled debut studio album of husband-and-wife electronic music duo New Look, consisting of singer and former model Sarah Ruba and Adam Pavao. The record was written in Toronto and recorded for two years in Berlin. The album garnered critical acclaim for its production, Ruba's vocals and the distinctiveness of each song, landing in the top 50 on Drowned in Sound's list of the best albums of 2011.

== Production ==
The songs were written in the couple's built-in home studio in Toronto. In writing the songs, Sarah Ruba wrote down phrases or lyrics in her notebook during studio time, while Pavao was experimenting in the studio. Ruba described the duo's songwriting as "Futurepop", saying: “Even though we feel like we’re gearing towards writing pop songs, it’s not like Britney Spears, you know? Also because of the synths, the ‘80s influence, it sounds kind of spacey; and when synthesizers first came out, they were like ‘The Future.’ It’s a way of using a nostalgic term for electronic instruments in combination with popular and futuristic sounds.”

The recording of New Look took place in Berlin for two years. Adam Pavao described their experience in Berlin in an interview: “It was really inspiring to be there and listen to the underground electronic stuff coming out of Berlin, because you don’t really hear that anywhere else. It was cool, like we went into the future a little bit. It inspired us to hear fresh, new music.”

== Composition ==
New Look is a close combination of modern-day music and the style of 1980s electropop acts including Visage, Soft Cell, Ultravox, Yazoo, Pet Shop Boys and Eurythmics. The 1980s sound of the album is achieved with what Heather Steele of The Line of Best Fit explained as the duo's "penchant for analogue equipment, MIDI gaps and double-tracked female vocals." Musically, New Look has the minimalism and space of indie pop act The xx to put Sarah Ruba's breathy, versatile vocal delivery in front of the mix, which was compared by reviewers to Aaliyah and Sade. The instrumentals was analogized in a review as "the work of the Neptunes melted in that same pot Björk used to cook up Vespertine." Other musical influences include the works of Dirty Projectors, Chromeo, Yazoo, Kraftwerk, Theo Parrish, Depeche Mode's in their early years, and Spandau Ballet.

The eighties electro elements are heard the clearest on tracks like the synth-saturated disco song "Nap on the Bow", which starts New Look. Including a "slow burning drum machine", it was described in a review for the magazine Clash as a strange combination of the songs "You’re Not Alone" by trip hop group Olive and "I Can’t Wait" by Nu Shooz.

== Critical reception ==
Professional ratings
Review scores
| Source | Rating |
|---|---|
| BBC Music | (very favorable) |
| Clash | 7/10 |
| CMJ | (very favorable) |
| DIY | 7/10 |
| Drowned in Sound | 8/10 |
| The Irish Times | 3/5 stars |
| Loud and Quiet | 8/10 |
| musicOMH | 4.5/5 stars |
| SLUG Magazine | (mixed) |
| Uncut | 4/5 stars |

New Look garnered critical acclaim, with some reviewers calling it one of the best albums of the year. As of January 2016, New Look holds an aggregate weighted mean of a 7.6 out of ten from the website AnyDecentMusic? based on nine reviews. Praise towards the album included Sarah Ruba's emotional vocal delivery, Adam Pavao's production and sound, and the distinctiveness of each track. Natalie Shaw of BBC Music honored New Look as "an essential record made by two people with astonishing control, skill and knowledge; one which makes us proud of what music has done in the past 20 years, and just what it can now create." Heather Steele, in her review for The Line of Best Fit, highlighted that the record "unfolds and reveals more after each and every listen," opining that every little sound and vocal part is deserved to be listened to. Ben Hogwood, a journalist for musicOMH, favored the lyrical content, in which "the uncertainty and originality of the lyrics lending an often unresolved tension to each song." She also noted that Ruba's voice in sounding like "as if she really means every word that she sings, an obvious point to note you might think, but one often overlooked."

Loud and Quiet's Reef Younis found the LP to be "expertly fashioned, set to cutely coax awkward shapes to unassuming, hip-snaking rhythms and irritatingly infectious melodies", concluding that "The standard was set high but the pop renaissance shows no sign of letting up." Clash magazine writer John Freeman scored the album a seven out of ten, calling it "pleasingly playable", while a CMJ critic stated that the duo were able to "create its own form of stark intimacy that the members, luckily for us, have translated nearly flawlessly into musical form." A review in DIY magazine called it an "outstanding debut to suggest that they will be around for a very long time", but also wrote that the album could be disliked for "favouring style over substance". A similar sediment was shared by Jim Carroll, a music critic for The Irish Times, writing that "In between the electro shimmer and the plush melodramatic moods (best experienced on The Ballad), New Look [...] show many good reasons to pay attention to what they’ll produce in the long run." However, one mixed review of New Look came from Dean O Hillis, a writer for SLUG Magazine. He wrote that the album's main issue was that the duo didn't know how to end their songs: "While not a total disaster, the missing key is obviously a skilled producer who could help them hone and sharpen their apparent talent."

== Track listing ==
All lyrics are written by Sarah Ruba; all music is composed by Adam Pavao.

| No. | Title | Length |
|---|---|---|
| 1. | "Nap On The Bow" | 4:42 |
| 2. | "Relax Your Mind" | 3:42 |
| 3. | "Numbers" | 5:04 |
| 4. | "A Light" | 3:19 |
| 5. | "The Ballad" | 6:09 |
| 6. | "Teen Need" | 3:35 |
| 7. | "You & I" | 4:03 |
| 8. | "So Real" | 3:30 |
| 9. | "Drive You Home" | 4:23 |
| 10. | "Everything" | 3:55 |
| Total length: | | 46:52 |
