= The Spirit of 176 =

Studio album by George Shearing and Hank Jones
- Released: March 1988
- Recorded: 1988
- Genre: Jazz
- Length: 54:40
- Label: Concord CJ 371
- Producer: Carl Jefferson

George Shearing chronology
Dexterity (1987)	The Spirit of 176 (1988)	Perfect Match (1988)

Hank Jones chronology
Duo (1987)	The Spirit of 176 (1988)	The Oracle (1989)

The Spirit of 176 is a 1988 album by the jazz pianists George Shearing and Hank Jones.

== Reception ==
Professional ratings
Review scores
Source	Rating
Allmusic	4/5 stars

Scott Yanow reviewed the album for Allmusic and wrote of Shearing and Jones that "Their unique matchup as a two-piano duo on this Concord release works surprisingly well for the two pianists manage to stay out of each other's way and the ensembles are not overcrowded. ...the results are swinging and tasteful. This somewhat obscure Concord CD is worth investigating".

== Track listing ==
1. "Oh! Look at Me Now" (Joe Bushkin, John DeVries) – 3:26
2. "Angel Eyes" (Earl Brent, Matt Dennis) – 3:53
3. "I Mean You" (Coleman Hawkins, Thelonious Monk) – 3:18
4. "You Don't Know What Love Is" (Gene DePaul, Don Raye) – 4:22
5. "To Hank Jones" (George Shearing) – 4:26
6. "Minor Contention" (Hank Jones) – 2:44
7. "Ask Me Now" (Monk) – 5:00
8. "Triste" (Antônio Carlos Jobim) – 3:25
9. "Take a Good Look" (Jones) – 3:21
10. "Sweet Lorraine" (Cliff Burwell, Mitchell Parish) – 3:57
11. "Young No More" (Frank Metis) – 5:28
12. "Lonely Moments" (Mary Lou Williams) – 4:19
13. "Star Eyes" (DePaul, Raye) – 4:02
14. "Confirmation" (Charlie Parker) – 3:43

== Personnel ==
- Hank Jones, George Shearing – piano

Production

- Abbey Anna, Paul Francis – art direction
- Andy Renner – assistant
- Herbert Waltl – associate producer
- Fred Jacobs – compilation editing
- Dave Fischer – cover photo
- Phil Edwards – engineer, mixing, mixing engineer
- Ted White – engineer
- John Burk – executive producer, producer
- Glen Barros – executive producer
- Nat Hentoff – liner notes
- Graeme Brown – mastering engineer
- George Horn – mastering
- Jill Simonsen – package design
- Carl Jefferson – producer
- Nick Phillips – producer
- Valerie Whitesell – production coordination
