= Latin Affair =

Studio album by George Shearing
- Released: November 1959
- Recorded: 1959
- Studio: Capitol (Hollywood)
- Genre: Jazz, Afro-Cuban jazz
- Label: Capitol ST 1275

George Shearing chronology
White Satin (1959)	Latin Affair (1959)	On the Sunny Side of the Strip (1960)

Latin Affair is a 1959 album by pianist George Shearing.

== Reception ==
Professional ratings
Review scores
Source	Rating
Allmusic	3/5 stars

The initial Billboard magazine review from November 30, 1959 chose the album as one of its "Special Merit Spotlights" and commented that "Shearing serves up his usual, lightly swingy, delicately phrased instrumental treatments of a group of Latin themes and standards...all dressed up in an infectious Latin beat".

Scott Yanow reviewed the album for Allmusic and awarded it three stars, commenting that "Although the personnel in his popular Quintet had changed a bit...Shearing and his guest Armando Peraza on congas remain the main soloists. The music on their melodic set includes South American melodies and swing standards; in both cases the easy-listening music is Latinized yet still influenced by bop. This enjoyable LP will be difficult to find".

Latin Affair and Shearing's 1958 album Latin Lace were featured in Tom Moon's 2008 book 1,000 Recordings to Hear Before You Die.

== Track listing ==
1. "All or Nothing at All" (Arthur Altman, Jack Lawrence) – 2:53
2. "Let's Call the Whole Thing Off" (George Gershwin, Ira Gershwin) – 1:55
3. "Afro No. IV" (Torrie Zito) – 2:31
4. "Magic" (George Shearing) – 2:17
5. "It's Easy to Remember" (Lorenz Hart, Richard Rodgers) – 2:09
6. "Estampa Cubana" (Armando Peraza) – 2:56
7. "You Stepped Out of a Dream" (Nacio Herb Brown, Gus Kahn) – 2:09
8. "Mambo Balahu" (Peraza) – 2:24
9. "Dearly Beloved" (Jerome Kern, Johnny Mercer) – 2:14
10. "Cuando Sono El Gaznaton" (Hernandez Avila) – 2:26
11. "This Is Africa" (Peraza) – 2:59
12. "Anywhere" (Sammy Cahn, Jule Styne) – 2:42

== Personnel ==
- George Shearing – piano
- Toots Thielemans – guitar
- Carl Pruitt – double bass
- Armando Peraza – congas
- Warren Chiasson – vibraphone
- Roy Haynes – drums
