= More Grand Piano =

Studio album by George Shearing
- Released: 1986
- Recorded: 1985
- Genre: Jazz
- Length: 39:18
- Label: Concord
- Producer: Carl Jefferson

George Shearing chronology
George Shearing & Barry Tuckwell Play the Music of Cole Porter (1986)	More Grand Piano (1986)	A Vintage Year (1986)

Professional ratings
Review scores
Source	Rating
Allmusic	4/5 stars

More Grand Piano is a 1986 studio album by the pianist George Shearing, the sequel to his 1985 album Grand Piano.

== Track listing ==
1. "My Silent Love" (Edward Heyman, Dana Suesse) – 4:19
2. "Change Partners" (Irving Berlin) – 4:49
3. "My Favorite Things" (Oscar Hammerstein II, Richard Rodgers) – 2:59
4. "You Don't Know What Love Is" (Gene de Paul, Don Raye) – 4:59
5. "Ramona" (L. Wolfe Gilbert, Mabel Wayne) – 2:14
6. "I Didn't Know What Time It Was" (Lorenz Hart, Richard Rodgers) – 7:02
7. "People" (Jule Styne, Bob Merrill) – 4:50
8. "East of the Sun (and West of the Moon)" (Brooks Bowman) – 4:10
9. "I Can't Get Started" (Vernon Duke, Ira Gershwin) – 4:19
10. "Dream" (Johnny Mercer) – 3:10
11. "Wind in the Willow" (Marvin Fisher, Jack Segal) – 5:25

== Personnel ==
=== Performance ===
- George Shearing – piano
