= George Shearing =

British jazz pianist (1919–2011)

Sir George Shearing OBE
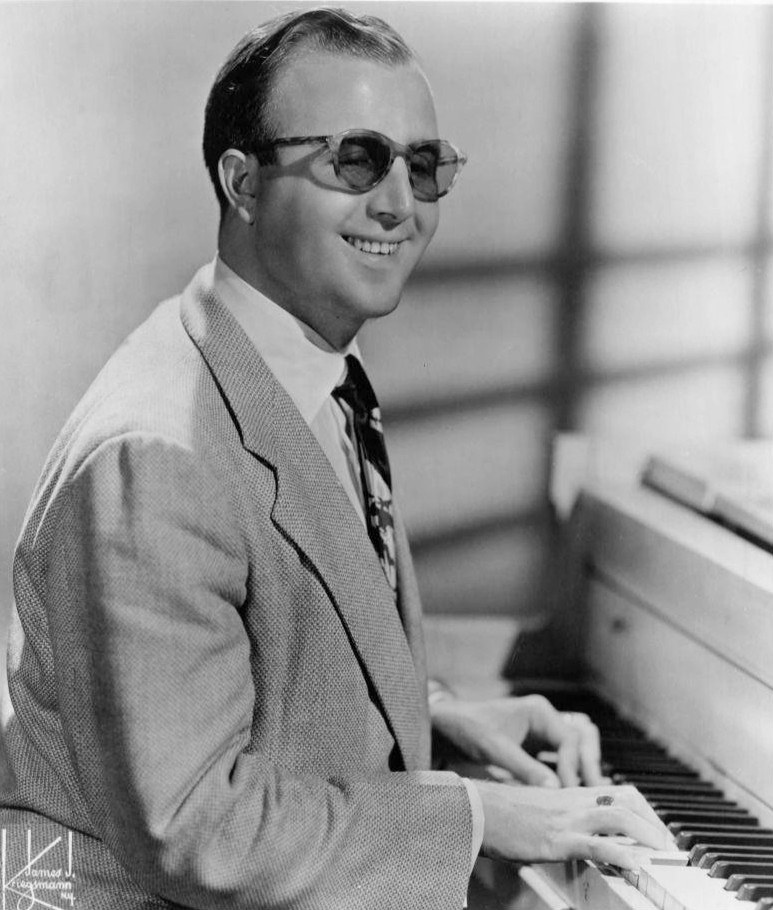
- Shearing in 1959

Background information
- Born: 13 August 1919; Battersea, London, England
- Died: 14 February 2011 (aged 91) New York City, U.S.
- Genres: Jazz; bebop; swing; cool jazz
- Occupation: Musician
- Instrument: Piano
- Years active: 1937–2011
- Labels: MGM; Capitol; Concord; Savoy

Sir George Albert Shearing (13 August 1919 – 14 February 2011) was a British jazz pianist and composer who for many years led a popular jazz group that recorded for Discovery Records, MGM Records and Capitol Records. Shearing was the composer of over 300 songs, including the jazz standards "Lullaby of Birdland" and "Conception", and had multiple albums on the Billboard charts during the 1950s, 1960s, 1980s and 1990s.

== Early life ==
Born in Battersea, London, Shearing was the youngest of nine children. He was born blind to working-class parents: his father delivered coal and his mother cleaned trains in the evening. He started to learn piano at the age of three and began formal training at Linden Lodge School for the Blind, where he spent four years.

Though he was offered several scholarships, Shearing opted to perform at a local pub, the Mason's Arms in Lambeth, for "25 bob a week" playing piano and accordion. He joined an all-blind band, Claude Bampton's Blind Orchestra, during that time, and was influenced by the records of Teddy Wilson and Fats Waller. Shearing made his first BBC radio broadcast during this time, after being befriended by Leonard Feather, with whom he started recording in 1937.

In 1940, Shearing joined Harry Parry's popular band. Around 1942 he was recruited by Stéphane Grappelli (domiciled in London during World War II) to join his band, which appeared at Hatchets Restaurant in Piccadilly in the early years of the war, and subsequently toured as "the Grappelly Swingtette" from 1943 onward. Shearing won six consecutive Top Pianist Melody Maker polls from this time onward. Around that time he was also a member of George Evans's Saxes 'n' Sevens band.

== United States years ==
Shearing emigrated to the United States, where his harmonically complex style mixing swing, bop and modern classical influences gained popularity. One of his first performances was at the Hickory House. He performed with the Oscar Pettiford Trio and led a jazz quartet with Buddy DeFranco, which led to contractual problems, since Shearing was under contract to MGM and DeFranco to Capitol Records.

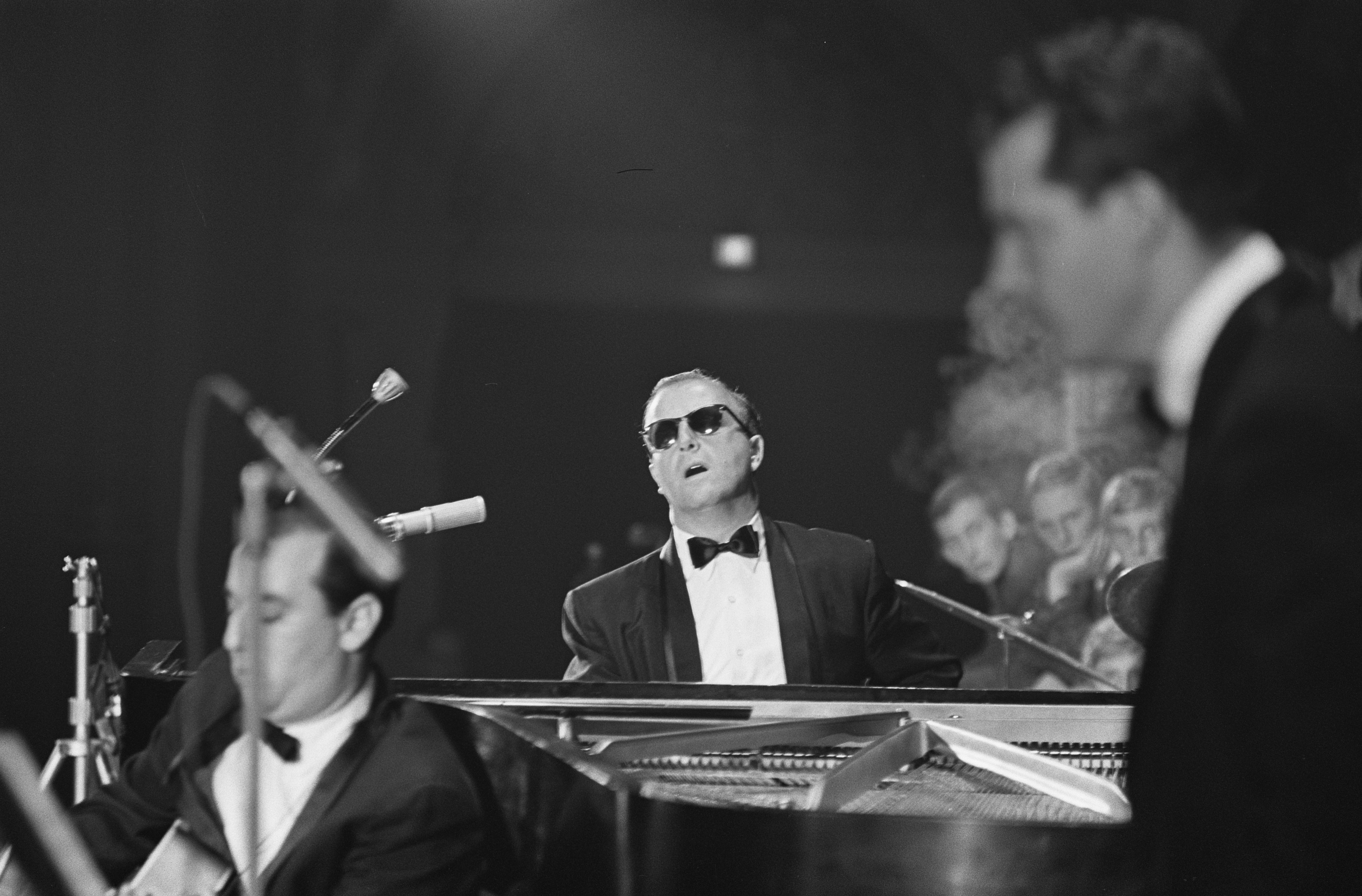
Shearing (centre) performing with the Quintet in Holland, 1962

In 1949, he formed the first George Shearing Quintet, a band with Margie Hyams (vibraphone), Chuck Wayne (guitar), later replaced by Toots Thielemans (listed as John Tillman), John Levy (bass), and Denzil Best (drums). This line-up recorded for Discovery, Savoy, and MGM, including the popular single "September in the Rain" (MGM), which sold over 900,000 copies in the United States alone with global sales in excess of one million; "my other hit" to accompany "Lullaby of Birdland". Shearing said of this hit that it was "as accidental as it could be." At this time, the novelist Jack Kerouac heard him play in Birdland, and later described the performance in his 1957 novel On the Road as "his great 1949 days before he became cool and commercial."

Shearing's interest in classical music resulted in some performances with concert orchestras in the 1950s and 1960s, and his solos frequently drew upon the music of Satie, Delius, and Debussy for inspiration. He became known for a piano technique known as "The Shearing Sound", or "Shearing voicing", a type of double melody block chord, with an additional fifth part that doubles the melody an octave lower. With the piano playing these five voices, Shearing would double the top voice with the vibraphone and the bottom voice with the guitar to create his signature sound. This piano technique is also known as "locked hands" and the jazz organist Milt Buckner is generally credited with inventing it. In Shearing's later career he played with a more conventional piano technique while maintaining his recognisable improvisational style.

In 1956, Shearing became a naturalised citizen of the United States. He continued to play with his quintet, with augmented players through the years, and recorded with Capitol until 1969. He created his own label, Sheba, that lasted a few years. Along with dozens of musical stars of his day, Shearing appeared on ABC's The Pat Boone Chevy Showroom in 1959. In 1953, he had appeared on the same network's reality show, The Comeback Story, in which he discussed how to cope with blindness.

== Later career ==
In 1970, he began to "phase out his by-now-predictable quintet" and disbanded the group in 1978. One of his more notable albums during this period was The Reunion (1976), made in collaboration with bassist Andy Simpkins and drummer Rusty Jones, and featuring Stéphane Grappelli, the violinist with whom he had debuted as a sideman decades before.

Later, Shearing played in a trio, as a soloist, and increasingly in a duo. Among his collaborations were sets with the Montgomery Brothers, Marian McPartland, Brian Q. Torff, Jim Hall, Hank Jones, Niels-Henning Ørsted Pedersen and Kenny Davern. In 1979, Shearing signed with Concord Records, and recorded for the label with Mel Tormé. This collaboration garnered Shearing and Tormé two Grammys, one in 1983 and another in 1984.

Shearing remained fit and active well into his later years and continued to perform, even after being honoured with an Ivor Novello Lifetime Achievement Award in 1993. He never forgot his native country and, in his last years, would split his year between living in New York and Chipping Campden, Gloucestershire, where he bought a house with his second wife, singer Ellie Geffert. This gave him the opportunity to tour the UK, giving concerts, often with Tormé, backed by the BBC Big Band. He was appointed OBE in 1996. In 2007, he was knighted. "So", he noted later, "the poor, blind kid from Battersea became Sir George Shearing. Now that's a fairy tale come true."

He was the subject of This Is Your Life in 1992 when he was surprised by Michael Aspel while performing at Ronnie Scott's Jazz Club.

In 2004, he released his memoirs, Lullaby of Birdland, which was accompanied by a double-album "musical autobiography", Lullabies of Birdland. Shortly afterwards, however, he had a fall at his home and retired from regular performing.

On 14 February 2011, Shearing died from heart failure at 91.

In October 2011, Derek Paravicini and jazz vocalist Frank Holder performed a tribute concert to the recordings of Shearing. Ann Odell transcribed the recordings and taught Paravicini the parts, as well as being the MD for the concerts. Lady Shearing also endorsed the show, sending a letter to be read out before the Watermill Jazz Club performance.

== Personal life ==
Shearing was married to Trixie Bayes from 1941 to 1973, with whom he had his only child, a daughter named Wendy. Two years after his divorce from Bayes he married singer Ellie Geffert.

He was a member of the Bohemian Club and often performed at the annual Bohemian Grove Encampments. He composed music for two of the Grove Plays.

== Awards and honours ==
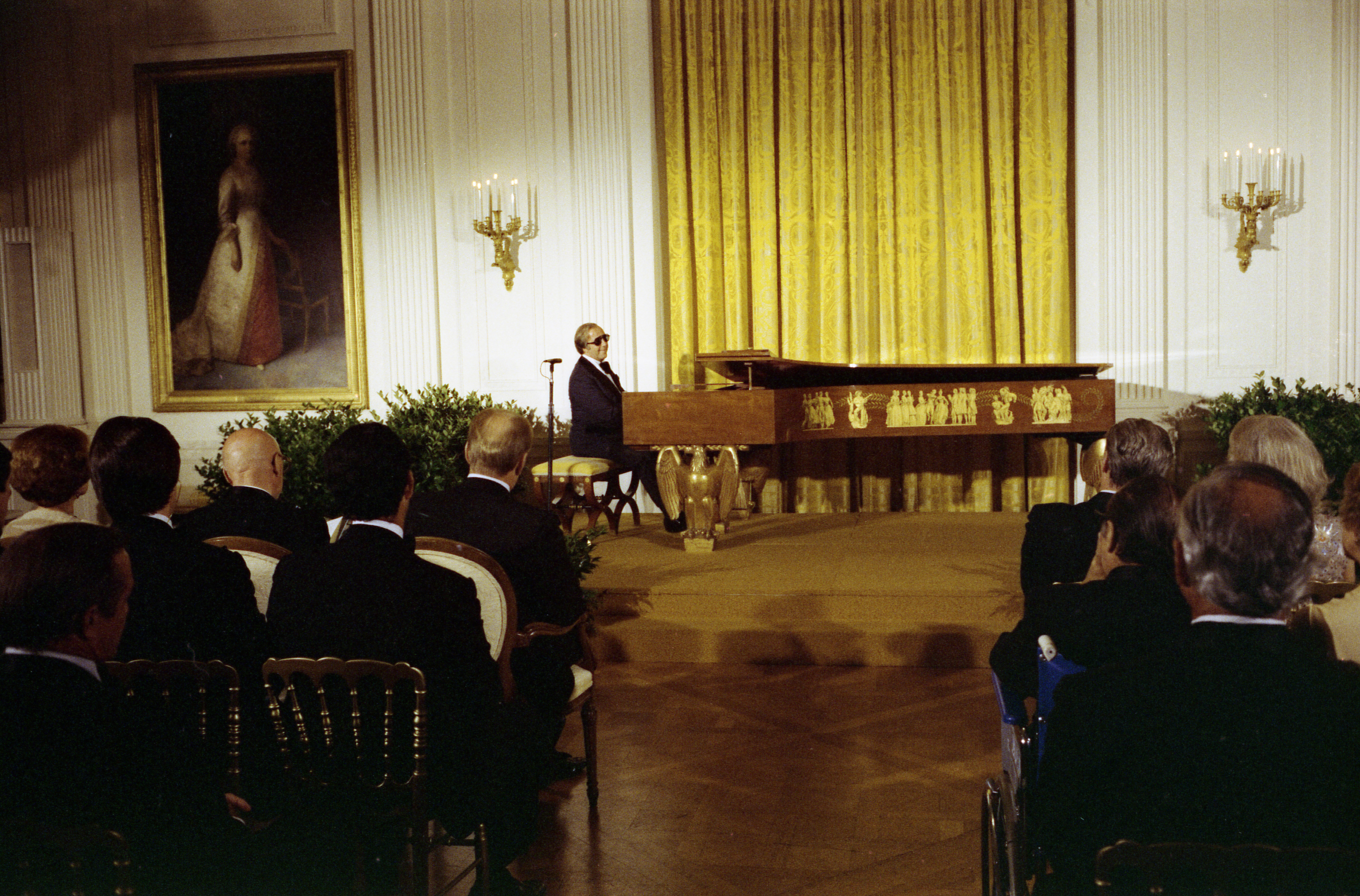
Shearing performing for Gerald Ford and Urho Kekkonen, the president of Finland, on 3 August 1976

- Performed at Royal Command Performance for Queen Elizabeth II and Prince Philip
- Performed for US Presidents Gerald Ford (1976), Jimmy Carter, and Ronald Reagan
- 1975 Honorary degree of Doctor of Music from Westminster College, Salt Lake City, Utah
- 1978 Horatio Alger Award for Distinguished Americans
- 1983 Grammy Award, An Evening with George Shearing & Mel Tormé
- 1984 Grammy Award, Top Drawer
- 1993 Ivor Novello Award for Lifetime Achievement
- 1994 Honorary degree of Doctor of Music from Hamilton College in New York
- 1996 Included in Queen's Birthday Honours List, invested by Queen Elizabeth II at Buckingham Palace as an Officer of the Order of the British Empire for "services to music and Anglo-US relations"
- 1998 Received the first American Music Award by the National Arts Club, New York City
- 2002 Honorary degree of Doctor of Music from DePauw University in Indiana
- 2003 Lifetime Achievement Award from BBC Jazz Awards
- 2007 Knighted for services to music

== Discography ==
=== As leader ===
- Pianology (London Records, 1948)
- Piano Solos with Rhythm (Savoy, 1950)
- Touch of Genius! (MGM, 1951)
- Shearing in Hi-Fi (MGM, 1955)
- The Shearing Spell (Capitol, 1955)
- Midnight on Cloud 69 with the Red Norvo Trio (Savoy, 1956)
- Black Satin (Capitol, 1956)
- Velvet Carpet (Capitol 1956)
- Lullaby of Birdland (MGM, 1957)
- The Shearing Piano (Capitol, 1957)
- Latin Escapade (Capitol, 1957)
- Burnished Brass (Capitol, 1958)
- Taking a Chance on Love with Billy Eckstine, Teddi King (MGM, 1958)
- Jazz Conceptions (MGM, 1958)
- In the Night (Capitol, 1958)
- Latin Lace (Capitol, 1958)
- Night Mist (Capitol, 1958)
- Rap Your Troubles in Drums (MGM, 1959)
- Blue Chiffon (Capitol, 1959)
- Shearing on Stage! (Capitol, 1959)
- Beauty and the Beat! with Peggy Lee (Capitol, 1959)
- George Shearing Goes Hollywood (MGM, 1959)
- The Shearing Touch (Capitol, 1960)
- Satin Brass (Capitol, 1960)
- Latin Affair (Capitol, 1960)
- White Satin (Capitol, 1960)
- On the Sunny Side of the Strip (Capitol, 1960)
- George Shearing and the Montgomery Brothers (Jazzland, 1961)
- Mood Latino (Capitol, 1961)
- Jazz Moments (Capitol, 1962)
- San Francisco Scene (Capitol, 1962)
- Satin Affair (Capitol, 1962)
- Smooth & Swinging (MGM, 1962)
- Soft and Silky (MGM, 1962)
- Concerto for My Love (Capitol, 1962)
- Shearing Bossa Nova (Capitol, 1962)
- Sassy Meets Shearing with Sarah Vaughan (Camay, 1962)
- Touch Me Softly (Capitol, 1963)
- It's Easy to Remember (Ace of Clubs, 1963)
- Jazz Concert (Capitol, 1963)
- Out of the Woods (Capitol, 1964)
- Old Gold and Ivory (Capitol, 1964)
- It's Real George (Coronet, 1965)
- Rare Form! (Capitol, 1966)
- New Look! (Capitol, 1967)
- Shearing Today! (Capitol, 1968)
- The Young George Shearing (1968)
- The Fool on the Hill (Capitol, 1969)
- Out of This World (Sheba, 1971)
- The Heart and Soul of Joe Williams and George Shearing (Sheba, 1971)
- Music to Hear (Sheba, 1972)
- G.A.S. (George Albert Shearing) (Sheba, 1972)
- As Requested (Sheba, 1972)
- Light, Airy & Swinging (MPS/BASF, 1973)
- The Way We Are (MPS/BASF, 1974)
- Continental Experience (MPS/BASF, 1974)
- My Ship (MPS, 1975)
- The Reunion with Stéphane Grappelli (MPS, 1977)
- The Shearing Piano (Capitol, 1977)
- The Many Facets of George Shearing (MPS, 1978)
- Windows (MPS, 1978)
- Two for the Road with Carmen McRae (Concord Jazz, 1978)
- 500 Miles High (MPS, 1979)
- Lullaby of Birdland (MGM, 1979)
- Getting in the Swing of Things (MPS, 1980)
- Blues Alley Jazz with Brian Torff (Concord Jazz, 1980)
- On a Clear Day with Brian Torff (Concord Jazz, 1980)
- Alone Together with Marian McPartland (Concord Jazz, 1981)
- An Evening with George Shearing & Mel Tormé (Concord Jazz, 1982)
- First Edition with Jim Hall (Concord Jazz, 1982)
- Top Drawer with Mel Tormé (Concord Jazz, 1983)
- Live at the Café Carlyle with Don Thompson (Concord Jazz, 1984)
- An Evening at Charlie's with Mel Torme (Concord Jazz, 1984)
- Grand Piano (Concord Jazz, 1985)
- An Elegant Evening with Mel Tormé (Concord Jazz, 1986)
- George Shearing & Barry Tuckwell Play the Music of Cole Porter (Concord, 1986)
- More Grand Piano (Concord Jazz, 1987)
- Breakin' Out (Concord Jazz, 1987)
- Dexterity with Ernestine Anderson (Concord Jazz, 1988)
- A Vintage Year with Mel Tormé (Concord, 1988)
- A Perfect Match with Ernestine Anderson (Concord Jazz, 1988)
- The Spirit of 176 with Hank Jones (Concord Jazz, 1989)
- George Shearing in Dixieland (Concord Jazz, 1989)
- Piano (Concord Jazz, 1990)
- Mel and George "Do" World War II with Mel Tormé (Concord Jazz, 1991)
- Get Happy! (EMI, 1991)
- I Hear a Rhapsody: Live at the Blue Note (Telarc, 1992)
- How Beautiful Is Night with the Robert Farnon Orchestra (Telarc, 1993)
- That Shearing Sound (Telarc, 1994)
- Walkin' with Neil Swainson, Grady Tate (Telarc, 1995)
- Paper Moon (Telarc, 1996)
- Favorite Things (Telarc, 1997)
- Christmas With The George Shearing Quintet (Telarc, 1998)
- Live at the Forum, Bath 1992 (BBC Music, 2000)
- Just for You: Live in the 1950s (2000)
- Back to Birdland (Telarc, 2001)
- Out of This World (2001)
- The George Shearing Trio (2002)
- Like Fine Wine (Mack Avenue, 2004)
- The Classic Concert Live with Mel Tormé, Gerry Mulligan (Concord Jazz, 2005)
- Live Jazz from Club 15 (2006)

=== As sideman ===
With Nancy Wilson

- The Swingin's Mutual! (Capitol, 1961)
- Hello Young Lovers (Capitol, 1962)
- R.S.V.P. (Rare Songs, Very Personal) (MCG, 2004)
- Guess Who I Saw Today (Capitol, 2005)

With others

- Claude Bolling, Concerto for Classic Guitar and Jazz Piano with Angel Romero (Angel, 1979)
- Count Basie, Blee Blop Blues (Green Line Records, 1990, 1954 and 1955 recordings)
- Dave Brubeck, Young Lions & Old Tigers (Telarc, 1995)
- Nat King Cole, Nat King Cole Sings/George Shearing Plays (Capitol, 1962)
- Michael Feinstein, Hopeless Romantics (Concord, 2005)
- John Pizzarelli, The Rare Delight of You (Telarc, 2002)
- Tito Puente, Mambo Diablo (Concord Jazz Picante, 1985)
- Joe Williams, Here's to Life piano on title track only (Telarc, 1994)

== Filmography ==
- 2003: George Shearing – Jazz Legend
- 2004: George Shearing: Lullaby of Birdland
- 2004: Swing Era – George Shearing
- 2004: Joe Williams with George Shearing: A Song is Born
- 2005: Duo Featuring Neil Swainson

== See also ==
- First English Public Jam Session
