= Ernestine Anderson =

American jazz and blues singer (1928–2016)

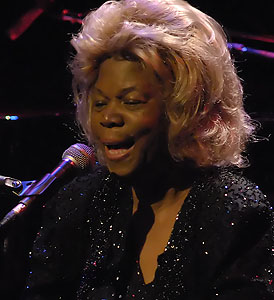
- Ernestine Anderson in 2008

Background information
- Born: Ernestine Irene Anderson; November 11, 1928; Houston, Texas, U.S.
- Died: March 10, 2016 (aged 87) Shoreline, Washington, U.S.
- Genres: Jazz, blues
- Occupation: Singer
- Label: Mercury Concord Jazz

Ernestine Anderson (November 11, 1928 – March 10, 2016) was an American jazz and blues singer. In a career spanning more than six decades, she recorded over 30 albums. She was nominated four times for a Grammy Award. She sang at Carnegie Hall, the Kennedy Center, the Monterey Jazz Festival (six times over a 33-year span), and at several international jazz festivals. In the early 1990s she joined Qwest Records, the label founded by fellow Garfield High School graduate Quincy Jones. She was a twin sister to Joesephine Anderson.

== Life and career ==
Ernestine Irene Anderson (and her twin sister Josephine) were born in Houston, Texas, on November 11, 1928. Her mother, Erma, was a housewife, and her father, Joseph, a construction worker who sang bass in a gospel quartet. By the age of three, Anderson showed a talent for singing along with her parents' old blues 78 rpm records by the likes of Bessie "The Empress of the Blues" Smith. Anderson started singing at a local church, singing solos in its gospel choir.

Anderson tells of her early life in the 1998 book The Jazz Scene:

"My parents used to play blues records all the time," Ernestine Anderson told me. "John Lee Hooker, Muddy Waters, all the blues greats. In Houston, where I grew up, you turned on the radio and what you got was country and western and gospel. I don't even remember what my first experience with music was. I sort of grew into it. My father sang in a gospel quartet and I used to follow him around, and both my grandparents sang in the Baptist church choir. And they had big bands coming through Houston like Jimmie Lunceford, Billy Eckstine, Erskine Hawkins, and Count Basie." Ernestine's godmother entered her in a local talent contest when she was twelve years old. "I only knew two songs," she admitted, "'On the Sunny Side of the Street' and 'So Long'. The piano player asked me what key did I do these songs in and I just said 'C' for some reason and it was the wrong key. In order to save face I sang around the melody, improvised among the melody, and when I finished one of the musicians told me I was a jazz singer."

Her family moved to Seattle, Washington, in 1944, when she was 16. Anderson attended Garfield High School, graduating in 1946. While a teenager, she was discovered by bandleader "Bumps" Blackwell, who hired her as a singer for his Junior Band. Anderson's first show was at the Washington Social Club on East Madison Street. The band (which later included Quincy Jones on trumpet, and a young Ray Charles on keyboard) performed regularly in jazz clubs on Seattle's Jackson Street.

When she was 18, Anderson left Seattle, to tour for a year with the Johnny Otis band. In 1952, she went on tour with Lionel Hampton's orchestra. After a year with the band, she settled in New York City, determined to make her way as a singer. Her appearance on Gigi Gryce's 1955 album Nica's Tempo (Savoy) led to a partnership with trumpeter Rolf Ericson for a three-month Scandinavian tour. Ernestine's first album in the United States was made after her debut album, recorded in Sweden and released here by Mercury Records under the title Hot Cargo (1958). The dean of America jazz critics, Ralph J. Gleason, began airing it on his hit-making radio show. In addition his nationally distributed San Francisco Chronicle jazz column, saying: "she is the best new jazz singer in a decade. She has good diction, time, an uncanny ability to phrase well, great warmth in her voice, a true tone and, on top of all that, she swings like mad", which created a huge sensation. In 1959 Anderson won the DownBeat "New Star" Award and recorded for Mercury to more acclaim, before dividing her time from the mid-1960s between America and Europe.

"I don't think jazz ever died. It suffered a setback during the sixties. I had to move to London in order to work because a jazz person couldn't work in the United States when rock 'n' roll became the music. I didn't think it would last this long, and I don't think the rock 'n' roll people thought it would last this long, but Quincy it had."

Her re-emergence in the mid-1970s (at which time Ray Brown was her manager) came as a result of a sensational appearance at the 1976 Concord Jazz Festival. A string of albums for Concord Records followed. The next 17 years sealed Anderson's reputation as a top-tier jazz and blues singer. She performed headlining shows far and wide and recorded almost 20 albums for Concord, two of which—1981's Never Make Your Move Too Soon and 1983's Big City—earned Grammy Award Best Jazz Vocal Performance nominations. In the years that followed Anderson toured widely—a triumphant series of dates in Japan led to the release of a four-disc live set in 1988—and that same year she made her debut at Carnegie Hall. In addition, Anderson has performed at the Hollywood Bowl, at the Women In Jazz event at the Kennedy Center in 1999, at Monterey (1959, 1982, 1984, 1987, 1990, 2007), and at numerous other jazz festivals from New Orleans to Brazil, Berlin, Austria, and all around the globe.

After leaving Concord Records in 1993, Anderson signed on with her old Seattle jazz scene pal, Quincy Jones, and his happening new label, Qwest, which issued two albums — 1993's Now and Then, and 1996's Blues, Dues & Love News — that also both received Grammy nominations. By the late 1990s, she was signed to the Koch International label, which issued her Isn't It Romantic (1998) album. In 2003, her HighNote label CD, Love Makes the Changes was a breakout hit, and brought her further accolades.

Ernestine Anderson was a follower of Nichiren Buddhism. She died peacefully, surrounded by her family in Shoreline, Washington, on March 10, 2016, at the age of 87.

Ernestine Anderson's great-grandson, Dwone Anderson-Young, was murdered on June 1, 2014.

== Awards and honors ==
Ernestine Anderson was featured in an article in Time magazine, August 4, 1958: "the voice belongs to Negro Singer Ernestine Anderson, at 29 perhaps the best-kept jazz secret in the land" after her first album release. She is inevitably compared to Ella Fitzgerald, Sarah Vaughan, Billie Holiday. Ernestine invariably rejects the comparisons. "I wish," she says, "they would let me be just me."

Anderson was one of 75 women chosen for the book, I Dream a World: Portraits of Black Women Who Changed America (1999), by Pulitzer Prize winning photographer Brian Lanker. Within this book Ernestine Anderson joins such company as Rosa Parks, Coretta Scott King, Oprah Winfrey, Lena Horne, and Sarah Vaughan.

She won the Golden Umbrella award at the Bumbershoot Seattle arts festival in 2002. The award honors artists from the Northwestern United States "who have significantly contributed to the cultural landscape of our region."

Anderson was chosen by the Pacific Northwest Chapter of the Recording Academy (an organization best known for the Grammy Awards) to receive its 2004 IMPACT Award. The IMPACT Award honors Northwest music professionals whose creative talents and accomplishments have crossed all musical boundaries and who have been recognized as an asset to the music community.

In 2012, the Low Income Housing Institute named a housing project the "Ernestine Anderson Place" in her honor, noting Anderson's long residence in Seattle's Central District where the units are located.

== Discography ==
=== As leader ===
- Hot Cargo [AKA It's Time For Ernestine] (Mercury, 1958)
- The Toast of the Nation's Critics (Mercury, 1959)
- The Fascinating Ernestine (Mercury, 1960)
- My Kinda Swing (Mercury, 1960)
- Moanin' Moanin' Moanin' (Mercury, 1960)
- The New Sound of Ernestine Anderson (Sue, 1963)
- Miss Ernestine Anderson (Columbia, 1967)
- Hello Like Before (Concord Jazz, 1977)
- Live from Concord to London (Concord Jazz, 1978)
- Sunshine (Concord Jazz, 1980)
- Never Make Your Move Too Soon (Concord Jazz, 1981)
- Seven Stars with Cal Tjader, Teddy Wilson, Eddie Duran (Concord Jazz, 1983)
- Big City (Concord Jazz, 1983)
- Three Pearls with Chris Connor, Carol Sloane (Eastworld, 1984)
- When the Sun Goes Down (Concord Jazz, 1984)
- Be Mine Tonight (Concord 1986)
- A Perfect Match with George Shearing (Concord Jazz, 1988)
- Boogie Down with the Clayton Hamilton Jazz Orchestra (Concord Jazz, 1989)
- Live at the Concord Jazz Festival: Third Set with Ed Bickert, Gene Harris, Marshall Royal (Concord Jazz, 1991)
- Now and Then (Qwest, 1993)
- Three Ladies of Jazz: Live in New York with Diane Schuur, Dianne Reeves (Jazz Door, 1995)
- Blues, Dues & Love News (Qwest, 1996)
- Isn't It Romantic (Koch Jazz, 1998)
- Love Makes the Changes (HighNote, 2003)
- A Song for You (HighNote, 2009)
- Nightlife: Live at Dizzy's Club Coca-Cola (HighNote, 2011)
- Ernestine Anderson Swings the Penthouse (HighNote, 2015) - recorded 1962

=== As guest ===
- Ray Brown Trio, Live at the Concord Jazz Festival 1979 (Concord Jazz, 1979)
- Frank Capp/Nat Pierce Juggernaut, Live at the Alley Cat (Concord Jazz, 1987)
- George Shearing, Dexterity (Concord Jazz, 1988)
- Concord All Stars, Ow! (Concord Jazz, 1988)

== Grammy history ==
- Career nominations: Four

Ernestine Anderson Grammy History
| Year | Category | Genre | Title | Label | Result |
| 1996 | Best Jazz Vocal Performance | Jazz | Blues, Dues & Love News | Qwest | Nominated |
| 1993 | Best Jazz Vocal Performance | Jazz | Now and Then | Concord | Nominated |
| 1983 | Best Jazz Vocal Performance - Female | Jazz | Big City | Concord | Nominated |
| 1981 | Best Jazz Vocal Performance - Female | Jazz | Never Make Your Move Too Soon | Concord | Nominated |
