= Carol Sloane discography =

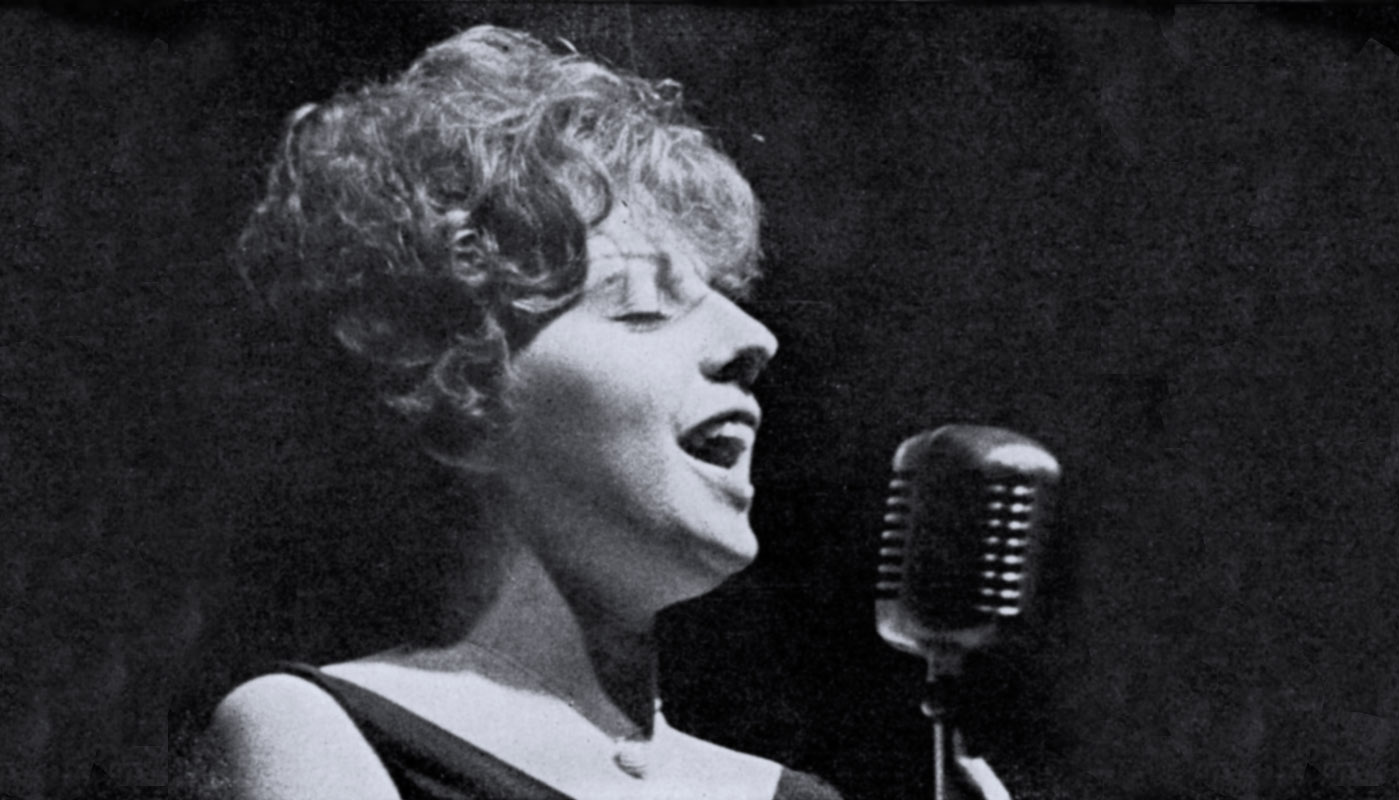
- Carol Sloane in 1961.
- Studio albums: 24
- Live albums: 5
- Compilation albums: 1
- Singles: 9
- Album appearances: 2

The discography of American singer, Carol Sloane, contains 24 studio albums, five live albums, one compilation album, nine singles and two album appearances. Columbia Records issued Sloane's first two studio albums in the early 1960s: Out of the Blue and Carol Sloane Live at 30th Street. The label also issued four singles between 1962 and 1965, including "I Want You to Be the First One to Know" (1962) and "Don't Worry 'bout Me" (1963). It was not until 1977 that Sloane's next studio album was released titled Sophisticated Lady. Three more studio collections followed in the decade: Spring Is Here (1977), Cottontail (1978) and Carol Sings (1979). Her first live album was also released during the decade, which was a collaboration with Ben Webster titled Carol & Ben (1977).

In 1982, Baybridge Records issued two live albums (Subway Tokens and Carol Sloane Live with Joe Pluma) and one studio collection (As Time Goes By). In 1984, the Eastworld label issued a collaborative studio collection between Ernestine Anderson, Chris Connor and Sloane titled Three Pearls. At the end of the decade came two studio albums by CBS and Sony: But Not for Me and Early Hours. The Contemporary label released 1989's Love You Madly and 1990's The Real Thing. In the 1990s, Concord Jazz issued five studio albums of Sloane's music, beginning with 1992's Heart's Desire. Other Concord albums included Sweet & Slow (1993), The Songs Carmen Sang (1995) and The Songs Ella & Louis Sang (a collaboration with Clark Terry in 1997).

In 2001, Concord issued Sloane's compilation Ballad Essentials. The HighNote label then issued two studio album by Sloane: I Never Went Away (2001) and Whisper Sweet (2003). In 2007, she collaborated with Ken Peplowski and Brad Hatfield on the studio collection Dearest Duke on Arbors Records. The same label then issued her final studio collection, We'll Meet Again (2010). Sloane's final live album was released in 2022 by Club44 Records titled Live at Birdland. The set spawned four singles between 2022 and 2025. These included "Havin' Myself a Time" and "Two for the Road".

== Albums ==
=== Studio albums ===
List of studio albums, showing all relevant details
Title	Album details
Out of the Blue	Released: May 1962; Label: Columbia; Formats: LP
Carol Sloane Live at 30th Street	Released: January 1963; Label: Columbia; Formats: LP
Sophisticated Lady	Released: 1977; Label: Trio; Formats: LP
Spring Is Here	Released: 1977; Label: LOBster; Formats: LP
Cottontail	Released: 1978; Label: Nadja; Formats: LP
Something Cool	Released: 1979; Label: Candid; Formats: LP
Carol Sings	Released: 1979; Label: Progressive; Formats: LP
As Time Goes By	Released: 1982; Label: Baybridge; Formats: LP
Summertime – Carol Sings Again	Released: 1983; Label: LOBster; Formats: LP
Three Pearls (with Ernestine Anderson and Chris Connor)	Released: 1984; Label: Eastworld; Formats: LP, CD
But Not for Me	Released: 1987; Label: CBS/Sony; Formats: LP, CD
Early Hours	Released: 1987; Label: CBS/Sony; Formats: CD
Love You Madly	Released: June 1989; Label: Contemporary; Formats: LP, CD, cassette
The Real Thing	Released: December 1990; Label: Contemporary; Formats: LP, CD, cassette
Heart's Desire	Released: May 1992; Label: Concord; Formats: CD, cassette
Sweet & Slow	Released: July 1993; Label: Concord; Formats: CD
When I Look in Your Eyes	Released: September 1994; Label: Concord; Formats: CD
The Songs Carmen Sang (with Phil Woods)	Released: August 1995; Label: Concord; Formats: CD
The Songs Sinatra Sang	Release: December 1996; Label: Concord; Formats: CD
The Songs Ella & Louis Sang (with Clark Terry)	Released: October 1997; Label: Concord; Formats: CD
Romantic Ellington	Released: 1999; Label: DRG Records; Formats: CD
I Never Went Away	Released: 2001; Label: HighNote; Formats: CD
Whisper Sweet	Released: 2003; Label: HighNote; Formats: CD
Dearest Duke (with Ken Peplowski and Brad Hatfield)	Released: June 12, 2007; Label: Arbors; Formats: CD, digital
We'll Meet Again	Released: 2010; Label: Arbors; Formats: CD, digital

=== Live albums ===
List of live albums, showing all relevant details
Title	Album details
Carol & Ben (with Ben Webster)	Released: 1977; Label: Honeydew; Formats: LP
Subway Tokens	Released: 1982; Label: Baybridge; Formats: LP
Carol Sloane Live with Joe Puma (with Joe Puma)	Released: 1982; Label: Baybridge; Formats: LP
A Night of Ballads	Released: 1984; Label: Baybridge; Formats: LP
Live at Birdland	Released: April 8, 2022; Label: Club44; Formats: CD, digital

=== Compilation albums ===
List of compilation albums, showing all relevant details
Title	Album details
Ballad Essentials	Released: 2001; Label: Concord; Formats: CD

== Singles ==
List of lead singles, showing title, year released and album name
Title	Year	Album	Ref.
"So Long" (Larry Elgart with Carol Vann) (Note: Sloane was credited in this release under one of her original stage names, Carol Vann.)	1953	—N/a	
"I Want You to Be the First One to Know"	1962	Out of the Blue	
"Don't Worry 'bout Me"	1963	—N/a	
"Music"	1965	—N/a	
"I Don't Care If the Sun Don't Shine"	1965	—N/a	
"Havin' Myself a Time (Radio Edit)"	2022	Live at Birdland	
"I Don't Want to Walk Without You (Radio Edit)"	2022	Live at Birdland	
"Two for the Road (Radio Edit)"	2023	Live at Birdland	
"As Long as I Live (Radio Edit)"	2025	Live at Birdland	

== Other album appearances ==
List of non-single guest appearances, with other performing artists, showing year released and album name
Title	Year	Other artist(s)	Album	Ref.
"The Lady Is a Tramp"	1960	Larry Elgart and His Orchestra	Easy Goin' Swing	
"What Are You Doing New Year's Eve?"	1994	—N/a	A Concord Jazz Christmas	
