= Birdland =

Birdland may refer to:

== Places and attractions ==
- Birdland Park and Gardens, a bird park at Bourton-on-the-Water, Gloucestershire, England
- Tropical Birdland, Leicestershire, a bird zoo
- Birdland, San Diego, a community
- Oriole Park at Camden Yards, nicknamed Birdland, an American baseball stadium
- Birdland (New York jazz club), a club in New York City
- Birdland (Hamburg jazz club), a jazz club in Hamburg
- Birdland, a jazz club in Vienna founded by Joe Zawinul
- Marie Byrd Land, a region of Antarctica

== Created works ==
- Drawing Blood, originally titled Birdland, a novel by Poppy Z. Brite
- Birdland (comic), an erotic comic book by Gilbert Hernandez, published by Eros Comix
- Birdland (TV series), an American series produced by Walter F. Parkes
- Gibson Byrdland, an electric guitar made by Gibson

Music

- Birdland (Birdland album), the debut album by Birdland
- Birdland (The Yardbirds album), a 2003 album by the Yardbirds
- Birdland, a posthumously released 2015 album by Buddy Rich
- "Birdland" (Chubby Checker song), single by Chubby Checker, 1963
- "Birdland", song by the Psychedelic Furs
- "Birdland" (Weather Report song), composed by Joe Zawinul, originally recorded by his band Weather Report, covered as a single by the Manhattan Transfer in 1980
- "Birdland", a song by Patti Smith from Horses
- "Lullaby of Birdland", a 1952 popular song written by George Shearing and George David Weiss
- The Birdland Big Band, 16-piece jazz orchestra in residence at Birdland Jazz Club in New York City
- Birdland (band), a 1980s English indie band
- Birdland, an American band co-founded by Lester Bangs

== See also ==
- Live at Birdland (disambiguation)
