= Live at Birdland =

Live at Birdland may refer to:

- Live at Birdland (John Coltrane album), 1964
- Live at Birdland (Lee Konitz album), 2009
- Live at Birdland (John Pizzarelli album), 2003
- Live at Birdland (Carol Sloane album), 2022
- Live at Birdland (Toshiko - Mariano Quartet), 1991
- Live at Birdland (Lester Young album), 2007
- Extended Play: Live at Birdland, by the Dave Holland Quintet, 2001
- Live at Birdland (Count Basie Orchestra album), 2021

== See also ==
- Birdland (disambiguation)
- Birdland (New York jazz club)
- A Night at Birdland Vol. 1, a live jazz album by the Art Blakey Quintet, recorded in 1954
- A Night at Birdland Vol. 2, a live jazz album by the Art Blakey Quintet, recorded in 1954
- A Night at Birdland Vol. 3, a live jazz album by the Art Blakey Quintet, recorded in 1954
