= Carol Sloane =

American jazz singer (1937–2023)

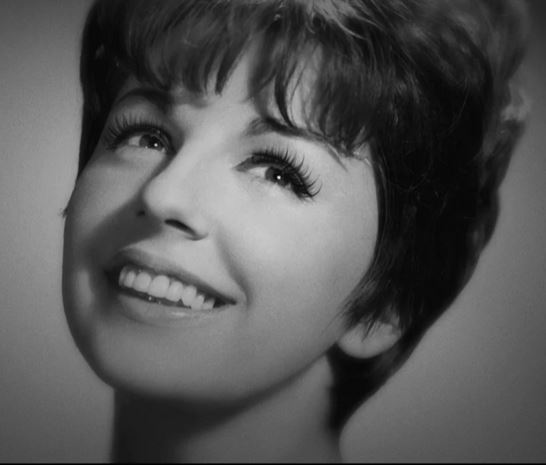
- Born: Carol Morvan; March 5, 1937; Providence, Rhode Island, U.S.
- Died: January 23, 2023 (aged 85)
- Occupation: Singer
- Years active: 1960–2022
- Works: Discography
- Spouses: Charlie Jefferds (m. 1955; div. 1958); Buck Spurr (m. 1986; died 2014)
- Partner: Jimmy Rowles (circa 1970s)
- Musical career
- Genres: Vocal jazz; swing
- Instrument: Vocals
- Labels: Columbia; Trio; LOBster; Nadja; Progressive; Baybridge; Eastworld; CBS–Sony; Contemporary; Concord; DRG; HighNote; Arbors; Club44

Carol Sloane (born Carol Morvan; March 5, 1937 – January 23, 2023) was an American singer. She was described by critics as being one of jazz music's most underrated singers and was considered a successor to her predecessor, Ella Fitzgerald.

Sloane became interested in jazz listening to the radio as a teenager and started performing with a big band at age 14. She then joined Larry Elgart's orchestra in 1958 where she toured across the US and occasionally recorded. A performance at the 1961 Newport Jazz Festival was heard by Columbia Records who signed her to a contract the same year. The label released two albums of jazz material by Sloane: Out of the Blue (1962) and Carol Sloane Live at 30th Street (1963). She also made regular television appearances on television programs like The Steve Allen Show and The Tonight Show Starring Johnny Carson. Her recording career waned as the decade progressed and she was dropped from Columbia by the mid 1960s.

Sloane had to take jobs outside of music to make ends meet but eventually returned to jazz after Japan rediscovered her. In the 1970s and 1980s, she made roughly ten albums for Japanese labels such as Sophisticated Lady (1977), Carol Sings (1979) and As Time Goes By (1982). She also lived in North Carolina during this time where she headlined routinely at the Frog and Nightgown club. However, Sloane was struggling financially again by the mid 1980s. She was then heard by singer Helen Keane who helped her sign with the US company, Contemporary Records where she recorded two albums, beginning with Love You Madly (1989). More albums were issued by Concord Jazz in the 1990s that brought renewed interest to her career and critical acclaim. Sloane continued recording and performing into the 2010s. Following her death, a documentary profiling her career was released titled Sloane: A Jazz Singer (2023).

== Early life ==
Carol Morvan was born on March 5, 1937 in Providence, Rhode Island to Frank and Claudia (Rainville) Morvan. Morvan and her eldest sister, Lois, were raised in the Providence suburb of Georgiaville. Her family played music and enjoyed singing together. Raised a Catholic, Morvan's earliest musical experiences included singing in the church choir with her family. She also attended Catholic School in her elementary years where she was taught by nuns to be "a good girl", according to Morvan. Around age 12, her parents bought her a radio where she heard early rock and roll during the day time and jazz at night time.

At age 14, she obtained a job singing twice a week with local bandleader, Ed Drew. The group performed at the Rhodes-on-the-Pawtuxet Ballroom in Cranston, Rhode Island where she was paid $9 per gig and performed under the name, Carol Van. In high school, she also worked as a secretary and a babysitter. One of her babysitting clients was local songwriter, Jim Howe, who had co-written the song "So Long". She traveled to New York City where she recorded his composition. After finishing high school in 1955, she married Charlie Jefferds. When he was drafted into the US Army, she followed him to Germany in 1957. Overseas, she appeared in traveling military musical productions, beginning with Kiss Me Kate. Upon returning to the US, the couple lived in Providence where Morvan obtained a secretarial position at a law firm. She also performed at a local club part-time where she was heard by Bob Bonis, a representative for Les and Larry Elgart. Bonis had her audition for Larry Elgart's Orchestra and she was hired in 1958.

== Career ==
=== 1960–1964: Breakthrough ===
Morvan stayed with the Elgart's big band for two years where she spent time touring with the group throughout the US. She also recorded with the orchestra, including an appearance on his 1960 RCA Victor LP, Easy Goin' Swing. Elgart did not like her maiden name, Morvan, and insisted on changing it. They experimented with different names before settling on the last name "Sloane", after she saw the name on a furniture store. Sloane left Elgart after realizing big band orchestras were becoming increasingly out-of-fashion. Now a solo artist, she performed at a Pittsburgh jazz festival where she was heard by Jon Hendricks of the trio, Lambert, Hendricks & Ross. Sloane agreed to Hendricks' offer to substitute for Annie Ross when was unable to perform in their trio. According to Sloane, Hendricks helped her land a spot performing at the 1961 Newport Jazz Festival where she appeared as part of their "New Faces" show. She wanted to sing "Little Girl Blue", but the festival's pianist did not know the verse. Sloane instead sang it acapella, which impressed the crowd that day. In the audience were jazz critics, along with representatives from Columbia Records, who offered her a contract several weeks later.

Her Columbia contract yielded two albums, beginning with the 1962 LP, Out of the Blue. The album was mostly a collection of ballads arranged by Bill Finegan. It spawned a 45 RPM single, which was a cover of "I Want You to Be the First to Know". Out of the Blue received critical acclaim, including from Billboard, which named it one of their "Special Merit Albums" on May 19, 1962. Her second Columbia LP was Carol Sloane Live at 30th Street, titled for its recording sessions that were held at New York City's 30th Street studios. It was named Cash Box magazine's "Jazz Picks of the Week" on January 19, 1963 and was rated three out five stars by AllMusic. She also recorded a live album in 1964, but it went unreleased until 1977 when it was issued by the Honeydew label.

Carol Sloane, circa 1960s

Sloane's career got further exposure on television during this period when she appeared on The Steve Allen Show and The Tonight Show Starring Johnny Carson. Sloane recalled being given the title of the "Queen of First 15" for appearing as the first guest on The Tonight Show from 11:15-11:30. Because most markets only picked up the show at 11:30, she often missed exposure to a larger national audience. Sloane also held concerts at night clubs like San Francisco's the Hungry I, Chicago's Mister Kelly's and New York City's The Blue Angel. Also on the bill were fellow jazz musicians Coleman Hawkins and Ben Webster, along with comedians like Woody Allen, Lenny Bruce and Richard Pryor. She also joined The Beatles and The Rolling Stones on their early US tours in 1964 due to her association with the tour's manager, Bob Bonis.

=== 1965–1985: Career setbacks and recordings in Japan ===
In 1965, Sloane's career was given a second go-round at Columbia. This time, she was pushed in a pop marketing direction that drew inspiration from the careers of Edyie Gorme and Peggy Lee. The 1965 single, "Music" (produced by John Simon and Ernie Altschuler), received some airplay on US top 40 radio, according to Billboard. She was ultimately dropped from Columbia's roster, but continued performing in concert during the 1960s, including at Boston's Jazz Workshop. Occasionally, she wrote album reviews for Down Beat magazine between September 1967 and May 1968. Despite this, Sloane was just making ends meet and returned to secretarial work in New York to pay her bills. In 1969, an agent contacted Sloane and coaxed her into moving to Raleigh, North Carolina to work at The Frog and Nightgown jazz club. Sloane performed monthly concerts centered around the music of Cole Porter and Noël Coward, while also working as a secretary for politician Terry Sanford during the weekday.

Sloane returned to New York City around 1977 to fill-in for Dee Dee Bridgewater in a concert with the New York Jazz Quartet. She also met pianist, Jimmy Rowles, and the two became romantically involved for a brief period. At the same time, Sloane started recording in Japan after the country took an interest in jazz. In 1977, the Japanese Trio label issued her first studio LP in over a decade titled Sophisticated Lady. The album was a collection of Duke Ellington tunes and would be one of several she recorded in tribute to him. When asked about Japan's jazz inclusiveness, Sloane told The Washington Post, "Possibly the reason that country is so damn successful in what it does is because they're so open to everything," Sloane told The Washington Post in 1984.

Sloane made roughly ten albums in Japan and they mostly featured American jazz players. Following the Trio album came the LOBster-issued Spring Is Here (1977) and the Nadja-issued Cottontail (1978). The latter was reissued by the US-based Choice label and was given a mixed review by Cash Box in 1980: "Although it sounds like it was recorded in her living room, the latest by singer Sloane is a joy." The American-based Progressive Records released Carol Sings in 1980. Sloane moved to Chapel Hill, North Carolina in 1981 where she booked jazz acts like Helen Merrill, George Shearing and Carmen McRae. She also hosted her own radio segment on Chapel Hill's WUNC FM in the mid 1980s. Among her 1980s Japanese album were 1982's As Time Goes By (released by Baybridge) and 1984's Three Pearls (released by Eastworld that also featured Chris Connor and Ernestine Anderson). Despite a continued output of material, Sloane's albums yielded limited sales figures.

=== 1986–2022: Late career comeback ===
By the mid 1980s, Sloane was back to just making ends meet. In her documentary, she recalled having just enough money to buy "cat food and a bottle of Scotch". She made a last-ditch effort to reignite her career by calling Boston club owner, Buck Spurr, who got her a gig working in a room on the top floor of a Howard Johnson's hotel. Spurr and Sloane later married. Sloane began working more regularly around 1985. In 1988, she was performing at the Milestone Club in San Francisco when she was approached by singer, Helen Keane, who helped her sign a recording contract with a US label called Contemporary Records. Her debut Contemporary release was 1989's Love You Madly, followed by 1990's The Real Thing. Combining American standards with lesser-known songs, both albums were met with critical acclaim and reignited her career in jazz.

The success of the Contemporary albums led to Sloane performing at the Concord-Fijitsu Festival. Her performance was heard by Concord Jazz label-head, Carl Jefferson who went up to her and asked, "So when am I gonna record you?". The invitation led to a contract with the company and six studio albums in the 1990s. Her label debut was 1992's Heart's Desire, which again featured a series of Great American Songbook tunes. It was followed by the similarly-themed studio releases Sweet & Slow (1993) and When I Look in Your Eyes (1994). Critics praised Sloane on the three discs for not over-singing any of the tracks and including more obscure American songbook selections.

The death of Carmen McRae (a mentor and friend of Sloane's) inspired Sloane to record a tribute album in memory of her which was titled The Songs Carmen Sang (1995). The songs chosen for the album included some of McRae's signature tunes and personal favorites of hers. Sloane's Japanese fans then coaxed her into recording a tribute disc of Frank Sinatra's music and the result was 1996's The Songs Sinatra Sang. Sloane then collaborated with flugelhorn player, Clark Terry, on The Songs Ella & Louis Sang, a tribute album inspired by the duets between Ella Fitzgerald and Louis Armstrong. All three tribute discs were praised for their musicianship and for the individuality brought to each song to make them sound different from the originals. Her final album of the decade was a second Ellington tribute issued by DRG Records called Romantic Ellington (1999).

Sloane continued appearing at clubs and performing into the 2000s. Highlights included New York concert dates at the Algonquin Hotel (where she previewed the 2001 High-Note album, I Never Went Away), the Village Vanguard and the Frederick P. Rose Hall. The HighNote label released Sloane's next album in 2003 titled Whisper Sweet, an 11-track selection of ballads. She then collaborated with instrumentalists Ken Peplowski and Brad Hatfield on a third Ellington album titled Dearest Duke (released by Arbors Records in 2007). The same label issued her next album in 2010 titled We'll Meet Again, a 13-track collection of lesser-remembered American standards. She semi-retired to care for her husband but returned to performing after his death in 2014. In 2022, Sloane's final album titled Live at Birdland was released. The making of the album, along with Sloane's life and career, were the subject of her 2023 documentary Sloane: A Jazz Singer. The documentary was released following her death in January 2023.

== Personal life and death ==
Sloane had two marriages and one long-term relationship during her lifetime. In 1955, she wed New England disc jockey, Charlie Jefferds. In a 2009 interview with JazzWax, Sloane credited Jefferds with getting her familiar with producing a radio show. The couple lived in Colorado and Germany during their marriage. When the couple returned from living in Germany in 1958, they both agreed to a divorce. "We realized we wanted different things out of life," she recalled. Sloane was also quoted in her documentary saying their marriage "was doomed to failure" due to their young age when they wed. Sloane entered a long-term relationship with jazz pianist, Jimmy Rowles, after she returned to New York in the 1970s. Although they were romantically-involved for three years, their relationship was often stormy due to Rowles's battle with alcoholism. Her increasing unhappiness with Rowles led to a suicide attempt. Sloane recalled taking an entire bottle of sleeping medication, which resulted in getting her stomach pumped at a local hospital.

In 1986, Sloane married Boston club manager, Buck Spurr. The pair met when Sloane had arranged to work at his night club called the Starlight Roof. "He was a sensitive, sweet, loving, caring man," she stated. The couple lived in Stoneham, Massachusetts. Spurr was plagued by a series of health problems, beginning with a heart attack six months after their wedding. Making a full recovery, he later went through two rounds of colon cancer. In his final years, Spurr was diagnosed with dementia and Sloane became his full-time caretaker until he died in 2014. After her husband's death, Sloane lived along in Stoneham and started suffering from back pain which debilitated her at times. In June 2020, Sloane suffered a stroke and she moved into a Massachusetts senior care facility. Sloane died on January 23, 2023 from her previous stroke complications.

== Artistry ==
Sloane's musical style was affiliated the jazz genre, specifically in vocal jazz and swing. Matt Schudel of The Washington Post described her style as having both "jazz and "swing" elements. Schudel also said that Sloane's music made her an heir to jazz predecessors like Sarah Vaughan and Carmen McRae. Similarly, AllMusic's Scott Yanow noticed "a strong sense of swing" in her style, including on the 1977 LP Sophisticated Lady. Critics have also described Sloane's voice in various ways. Penelope Green of The New York Times characterized Sloane as a "honey-voiced jazz singer" while in an older New York Times article, John S. Wilson wrote, "She has basically husky, smoky voice that can rise to a point of dark lyricism."

In her teenage years, Sloane listened to jazz on late night radio shows and listened mostly to Ella Fitzgerald, Carmen McRae, Sarah Vaughan and Billie Holiday, all of whom she would later describe as her greatest influences. Her music was often compared to Fitzgerald, including in an excerpt from Will Friedwald in his book A Biography of the Great Jazz and Pop Singers: "Like Fitzgerald, Sloane can be warm and winning on a slow love song–and really make you feel it–yet her attention to lyrics seems generally secondary to what she does with melody, tone and rhythm." Dan Morgenstern of Metronome also compared her similarly by writing in 1961, "Miss Sloane has something of the purity and mannerisms of that grace Ella Fitzgerald."

== Legacy ==
Writers like Scott Yanow have described Sloane as one of jazz's most "underrated" vocalists. Others have explained that Sloane's career was largely overshadowed by rock music, which had replaced jazz in American popular music and ultimately caused Sloane to be overlooked. Authors have also cited Sloane as one of the genre's greatest artists. Bruce Crowther and Mike Pinfold of the book Singing Jazz: The Singers and Their Styles said that Sloane "forever will be closely and rightly linked with the great singers of the preceding generation." Matt Schudel of The Washington Post wrote, "If Carol Sloane isn't America's greatest living jazz singer, then no one deserves the title." Her music has influenced other jazz singers including Catherine Russell, who commented in her documentary, "Carol Sloane is right in there with everybody you need to hear". In April 2016 Sloane was among the inductees into the Rhode Island Music Hall of Fame (RIMHOF).

== Discography ==
Studio albums

- Out of the Blue (1962)
- Carol Sloane Live at 30th Street (1963)
- Sophisticated Lady (1977)
- Spring Is Here (1977)
- Cottontail (1978)
- Carol Sings (1979)
- As Time Goes By (1982)
- Summertime – Carol Sings Again (1983)
- Three Pearls (with Ernestine Anderson and Chris Connor) (1984)
- But Not for Me (1987)
- Early Hours (1987)
- Love You Madly (1989)
- The Real Thing (1990)
- Heart's Desire (1992)
- Sweet & Slow (1993)
- When I Look in Your Eyes (1994)
- The Songs Carmen Sang (with Phil Woods) (1995)
- The Songs Sinatra Sang (1996)
- The Songs Ella & Louis Sang (with Clark Terry) (1997)
- Romantic Ellington (1999)
- I Never Went Away (2001)
- Whisper Sweet (2003)
- Dearest Duke (with Ken Peplowski and Brad Hatfield) (2007)
- We'll Meet Again (2010)
