= The Songs Ella & Louis Sang =

Studio album by Carol Sloane & Clark Terry
- Released: October 1997
- Genre: Jazz
- Label: Concord Jazz
- Producer: John Burk; Allen Farnham

Carol Sloane chronology
The Songs Sinatra Sang (1996)	The Songs Ella & Louis Sang (1997)	Romantic Ellington (1999)

Clark Terry chronology
Clark Terry Express (1996)	The Songs Ella & Louis Sang (1997)	One on One (2000)

The Songs Ella & Louis Sang is a studio album between American singer Carol Sloane and American flugelhorn player, Clark Terry. It was released in October 1997 by Concord Jazz. The album pays tribute to the duet recordings made between Louis Armstrong and Ella Fitzgerald while they were at Verve Records. It received a positive critical reception following its release.

== Background, recording and content ==
Flugelhorn player, Clark Terry, found jazz acclaim working with big bands in the 1940s and then as a solo artist in the 1950s. Vocalist, Carol Sloane, initially had jazz success with two albums for Columbia Records in the 1960s but her career stalled in the US until it was reignited with releases on Concord Jazz in the 1990s. The Songs Ella & Louis was a collaboration between Sloane and Terry. It pays tribute to the music made between Louis Armstrong and Ella Fitzgerald at Verve Records. The project was produced by John Burk and Allen Farnham and contained 12 tracks. The songs chosen were not only songs originally recorded by Armstrong and Fitzgerald together, but also songs they had recorded separately. Terry not only plays his instrument but also sings with Sloane. In an interview with Billboard, Sloane recalled trying to evoke the same style that the songs were originally performed in: Clark and I stay close to the way Ella and Louis did it. I pretty much sing the things straight, and he growls away in the background and throws in ad-libs. It's wonderfully funny."

== Release and critical reception ==
The Songs Ella & Louis Sang was released by Concord Jazz in October 1997 and was distributed as a compact disc (CD) in its initial release. The project generated positive critical reception. Fred Bouchard of the Jazz Times praised the pair's performance style, writing, "They capture the spirit of Ella and Louis who did duet most of these at similarly leisurely tempos on their Ella & Louis albums, and Carol and Clark easily key on their mellow swing and savor the gracious humor." Richard S. Ginell of AllMusic gave the album a four-star rating and found the album pays a solid tribute to the original artists while showing the Sloane-Terry pairing in their own musical styles. "Carol Sloane and Clark Terry are definitely not imitators of anybody; it is their inimitable styles, mannerisms, lyrical bents, and distinctive senses of humor that make this disc happen." Biographer, Will Friedwald, called the album a "first rate offering" when describing Sloane's Concord discography from the era.

== Track listing ==
The Songs Ella & Louis Sang
No.	Title	Writer(s)	Length
1.	"I Won't Dance"	Jerome Kern; Oscar Hammerstein II; Otto Harbach; Dorothy Fields; Jimmy McHugh	5:00
2.	"Tenderly"	Walter Gross; Jack Lawrence	4:22
3.	"Don't Be That Way"	Benny Goodman; Mitchell Parish; Edgar M. Sampson	6:17
4.	"Can't We Be Friends?"	Paul James; Kay Swift	4:32
5.	"Gee, Baby, Ain't I Good to You?"	Andy Razaf; Don Redman	4:28
6.	"Autumn in New York"	Vernon Duke	5:34
7.	"Let's Do It"	Cole Porter	5:07
8.	"The Stars Fell on Alabama"	Frank Perkins; Parish	4:57
9.	"Moonlight in Vermont"	John Blackburn; Karl Suessdorf	4:13
10.	"Blueberry Hill"	Vincent Rose; Larry Stock; Al Lewis	5:37
11.	"Stompin' at the Savoy"	Goodman; Chick Webb; Sampson; Andy Razaf	5:43
12.	"When It's Sleepy Time Down South"	Clarence Muse; Leon René; Otis René	3:26

== Personnel ==
All credits are adapted from the liner notes of The Songs Ella & Louis Sang.

Musical personnel

- Bill Charlap – Piano
- Dennis Mackrel – Drums
- Marcus McLaurine – Bass
- Carol Sloane – Vocals
- Clark Terry – Flugelhorn

Technical personnel

- Terri Bloom – Photography
- John Burk – Executive producer
- Allen Farnham – Producer
- George Horn – Mastering
- Kent Judkins – Art direction
- Ray Salas – Assistant recorder
- George Simon – Liner notes
- Jason Standard – Assistant mixing
- Kathleen Vance – Production manager
- Allan Varner – Engineering and mixing

== Release history ==
Release history and formats for The Songs Ella & Louis Sang
Region	Date	Format	Label	Ref.
Various	October 1997	Compact disc (CD)	Concord Jazz	
Various	circa 2020	Music download; streaming	Concord Jazz	
