= Heart's Desire (album) =

Studio album by Carol Sloane
- Released: May 1992
- Recorded: September 1991
- Studio: Coast Recorders
- Genre: Jazz
- Label: Concord Jazz
- Producer: John Burk; Carl Jefferson

Carol Sloane chronology
The Real Thing (1990)	Heart's Desire (1992)	Sweet & Slow (1993)

Heart's Desire is a studio album by American singer, Carol Sloane. It was released in May 1992 by the Concord Jazz label and was her first release for the company. Sloane would go on to record a string of albums for Concord during the 1990s decade. The jazz collection consisted of 13 American standards recorded with a trio. The album was given critical praise from several publications, including Billboard and AllMusic.

== Background, recording and content ==
Carol Sloane first had success in jazz after a critically acclaimed performance at the 1961 Newport Jazz Festival. This led to two albums for Columbia Records and series of gigs in the 1960s. However, jazz became less popular as the decade progressed and Sloane took jobs outside of music. She also made several albums in Japan during the 1970s and 1980s before reigniting her career. In her next musical phase, Sloane made five albums for Concord Jazz in the 1990s that were considered "high quality". Heart's Desire was Sloane's first album for the label and was recorded at the Coast Recorders studio in San Francisco. The sessions were held in September 1991 and were produced by Carl Jefferson. The collection consisted of 13 tracks that were considered American standards. Among these tracks were "Secret Love", "September in the Rain" and "Memories of You". All of the songs were backed by a trio consisting of John Lockwood, Colin Bailey and Stefan Scaggiari.

== Release and critical reception ==
Heart's Desire was released by Concord Jazz in May 1992 and was offered in two formats: a compact disc (CD) or a cassette. It was given a positive critical response. Billboard found Sloane to demonstrate "a throaty, sexy delivery that's still quite graceful and swinging" on the album. Hi-Fi/Stereo Review described Sloane as "excellent" and "sultry" throughout the collection. AllMusic's Scott Yanow rated it four out of five stars, finding that she was "putting the proper amount of emotion" behind each of the songs featured on the album. Biographer, Will Friedwald praised Heart's Desire (along with her other Concord releases) as being "the most consistently excellent and rewarding work of Sloane's career".

== Track listing ==
Heart's Desire
No.	Title	Writer(s)	Length
1.	"Secret Love"	Sammy Fain; Paul Francis Webster	3:13
2.	"Memories of You"	Andy Razaf; Eubie Blake	3:51
3.	"Heart's Desire"	Alan Broadbent; Dave Frishberg	4:34
4.	"September in the Rain"	Harry Warren; Al Dubin	5:05
5.	"Devil May Care"	Bob Dorough; T.P. Kirk	3:41
6.	"You Must Believe in Spring"	Michel Legrand; Alan Bergman; Jacques Louis Demy; Marilyn Keith	5:16
7.	"Them There Eyes"	Maceo Pinkard; Doris Tauber; William Tracey	3:14
8.	"Never Never Land/My Ship"	Adolph Green; Betty Comden; Ira Gershwin; Jule Styne; Kurt Weill	4:38
9.	"He Loves and She Loves"	George Gershwin; I. Gershwin	3:05
10.	"Fairy Tales"	Chan Parker; Per Husby	4:22
11.	"Robbin's Nest"	Bob Russell; Illinois Jacquet; Sir Charles Thompson	3:55
12.	"You'll See"	Carroll Coates	5:49
13.	"For Susannah Kyle"	Parker; Leonard Bernstein	1:33

== Personnel ==
All credits are adapted from the liner notes of Heart's Desire.

Musical personnel

- Colin Bailey – Drums
- John Lockwood – Bass
- Stefan Scaggiari – Piano
- Carol Sloane – Vocals

Technical personnel

- Wally Buck – Engineer
- John Burk – Assistant producer
- Phil Edwards – Remixing
- George Horn – Mastering
- Carl Jefferson – Producer
- Kent Judkins – Art direction
- Herb Snitzer – Photography
- Peter Steinman – Assistant engineer

== Release history ==
Release history and formats for Heart's Desire
Region	Date	Format	Label	Ref.
Various	May 1992	Compact disc (CD); cassette	Concord Jazz	
Various	circa 2020	Music download; streaming	Concord Jazz	
