= Sweet & Slow =

Studio album by Carol Sloane
- Released: July 1993
- Recorded: April 1993
- Studio: Penny Lane Studios
- Genre: Jazz
- Label: Concord Jazz
- Producer: John Burk; Carl Jefferson

Carol Sloane chronology
Heart's Desire (1992)	Sweet & Slow (1993)	When I Look in Your Eyes (1994)

Sweet & Slow is a studio album by American singer, Carol Sloane. It was released in July 1993 by Concord Jazz and contained 12 tracks of cover tunes. It was Sloane's second album for Concord and received critical acclaim from AllMusic and the Sun Sentinel.

== Background, recording and content ==
Carol Sloane found jazz success after performing at the Newport Jazz Festival in 1961, which led to two albums for Columbia Records and more opportunities in the genre. However, jazz declined in popularity in the US and Sloane recorded Japan for nearly a decade along with finding odd jobs outside of music to make ends meet. In the early 1990s, Sloane performed at the Concord-Fujitsu Festival, where she was approached by label-head, Carl Jefferson. He invited her to join the Concord Jazz roster, which she accepted and six albums of her music were released during the 1990s. Sweet & Slow was Sloane's second album with the label and was recorded in April 1993. Sessions were held at Penny Lane Studios in New York City and was co-produced by Jefferson and John Burk. The project consisted of 12 songs that were covers, including a tribute to Lee Wiley on "Woman's Intuition" and Hoagy Carmichael's "One Morning in May".

== Release and critical reception ==
Sweet and Slow was released by Concord Jazz in July 1993 and was originally offered as a compact disc (CD). The album garnered positive reception from critics after its release. The Florida Sun-Sentinel praised Sloane's voice, calling it "sultry and sophisticated". In addition, the newspaper also found that she gave new "meaning" and "purpose" to the recordings on the collection. Scott Yanow of AllMusic rated the album 4.5 out of 5 stars, recommending the collection to listeners while also calling her Concord albums "consistently enjoyable". Comparing it to her other Concord albums, biographer, Will Friedwald, praised Sweet & Slow as being "the most consistently excellent and rewarding work of Sloane's career".

== Track listing ==
Sweet & Slow
No.	Title	Writer(s)	Length
1.	"Sometime Ago"	Sergio Mihanovich	3:32
2.	"One Morning in May"	Hoagy Carmichael; Mitchell Parish	3:46
3.	"I'm Way Ahead of the Game"	Robert E. Dolan; Johnny Mercer	4:28
4.	"I'm Getting Sentimental Over You"	George Bassman; Ned Washington	5:26
5.	"Until I Met You"	Freddie Green; Don Wolf	4:14
6.	"Sweet and Slow"	Al Dubin; Harry Warren	5:51
7.	"You're Getting to Be a Habit with Me"	Dubin; Warren	3:47
8.	"A Woman's Intuition"	Ned Washington; Victor Young	3:37
9.	"Baubles, Bangles, & Beads"	Robert Wright; George Forrest	4:52
10.	"An Older Man Is Like an Elegant Wine"	Lee Wing	5:06
11.	"If I Could Be with You One Hour Tonight"	James P. Johnson; Henry Creamer	3:11
12.	"I Got It Bad and That Ain't Good"	Duke Ellington; Paul Francis Webster	6:53

== Personnel ==
All credits are adapted from the liner notes of Sweet & Slow.

Musical personnel

- Colin Bailey – Drums
- John Lockwood – Bass
- Stefan Scaggiari – Piano
- Carol Sloane – Vocals
- Frank Wess – Tenor saxophone

Technical personnel

- John Burk – Assistant producer
- Phil Edwards – Engineer, remixing
- David Fischer – Photography
- James Gavin – Liner notes
- George Horn – Mastering
- Carl Jefferson – Producer
- Kent Judkins – Art direction
- Blaise Sires – Engineer
- Ed Trabanco – Recorder

== Release history ==
Release history and formats for Sweet & Slow
Region	Date	Format	Label	Ref.
Various	July 1993	Compact disc (CD)	Concord Jazz	
Various	circa 2020	Music download; streaming	Concord Jazz	
