= Dearest Duke =

Studio album by Carol Sloane with Ken Peplowski and Brad Hatfield
- Released: June 12, 2007
- Recorded: January 2007
- Studio: Peter Contrimas Studio
- Genre: Jazz
- Label: Arbors
- Producer: Carol Sloane; Ken Peploswki; Mat Domber; Rachel Domber

Carol Sloane chronology
Whisper Sweet (2003)	Dearest Duke (2007)	We'll Meet Again (2010)

Dearest Duke is a studio album by American singer Carol Sloane. It also features Ken Peplowski (playing clarinet and saxophone) and Brad Hatfield (playing piano). The album was released on June 12, 2007 by Arbors Records and featured 12 tracks paying tribute to Duke Ellington. The collection received critical acclaim following its release from publications like The Washington Post and the Jazz Times.

== Background, recording and content ==
Carol Sloane first had success in jazz during the 1960s when she recorded for Columbia Records. However, her career stalled after two albums despite a continued output of material recorded for the Japanese market (where jazz had a larger fan base). In the late 1980s, her carer was reignited when she recorded critically-acclaimed albums for the Contemporary and Concord Jazz labels. She continued recording into the new millennium, which included Dearest Duke. The project was recorded in January 2007 at the Peter Contrimas Studio in Westwood, Massachusetts. Serving as co-producers were Sloane herself, along with Ken Peploswki, Mat Domber and Rachel Domber. Dearest Duke consisted of 12 tracks all recorded as a tribute to jazz musician, Duke Ellington. A majority of the album's tracks are ballads in collaboration with pianist Brad Hatfield and clarinet-saxophonist Brad Peplowski.

== Release and critical reception ==
Dearest Duke was released by Arbors Records on June 12, 2007 and was offered as a compact disc (CD) upon its original release. It was also offered digitally. The album generated a positive critical reception. Christopher Loudon of the Jazz Times praised Sloane's interpretation of Ellington's tracks and her ability to blend with the instrumentalists: "Her ability to shape 11 duskily majestic tracks supported by just piano (courtesy of Brad Hatfield) plus touches of woodwind and brass (with Ken Peplowski alternating on clarinet and sax) simply heightens their magnificence." Matt Schudel of The Washington Post praised Sloane and the album, writing, "This is the finest vocal album I've heard all year, and if Carol Sloane isn't America's greatest living jazz singer, then no one deserves the title." Ronnie D. Lankford, Jr. of AllMusic rated it three and a half stars, also praising Sloane's ability to make Ellington's songs her own and concluding, "There's something to be said for bringing all musical elements to bear on the singer and the song, and this approach works just fine on Dearest Duke."

== Track listing ==
Dearest Lady
No.	Title	Writer(s)	Length
1.	"Sophisticated Lady"	Duke Ellington; Irving Mills; Mitchell Parish	4:59
2.	"Solitude"	Ellington; Mills; Eddie DeLange	4:46
3.	"I Let a Song Go Out of My Heart/Do Nothing till You Hear from Me"	Ellington; Henry Nemo; Mills; John Redmond; Bob Russell	4:15
4.	"I Didn't Know About You"	Ellington; Russell	4:48
5.	"Serenade to Sweden"	Ellington	5:43
6.	"Mood Indigo"	Ellington; Mills; Barney Bigard	4:15
7.	"Rocks in My Bed/I Ain't Got Nothin' but the Blues"	Ellington; Don George	5:35
8.	"In a Sentimental Mood/Prelude to a Kiss"	Ellington; Mills; Irving Gordon; Manny Kurtz	5:07
9.	"Day Dream"	Ellington; Billy Strayhorn; John Latouche	5:32
10.	"I Got It Bad and That Ain't Good"	Ellington; Paul Francis Webster	6:41
11.	"Just A-Sittin' and A-Rockin'/All Too Soon"	Ellington; Strayhorn; Lee Gaines; Carl Sigman	6:15
12.	"Just Squeeze Me (But Don't Tease Me)"	Ellington; Gaines	3:11

== Personnel ==
All credits are adapted from the liner notes of Dearest Duke.

Musical and technical personnel

- Jim Czak – Mastering, mixing
- Mat Domber – Producer
- Rachel Domber – Producer
- Brad Hatfield – Piano
- Ben Kontrinas – Engineer
- Ken Peploswki – Clarinet, tenor saxophone, vocals (track 12), producer
- Carol Sloane – Vocals, producer, audio production
- Eric Stephen Jacobs – Cover design, cover photo

== Release history ==
Release history and formats for Dearest Duke
Region	Date	Format	Label	Ref.
Various	June 12, 2007	Compact disc (CD); digital	Arbors Records	
