= Birdland (Hamburg jazz club) =

Jazz club in Hamburg, Germany

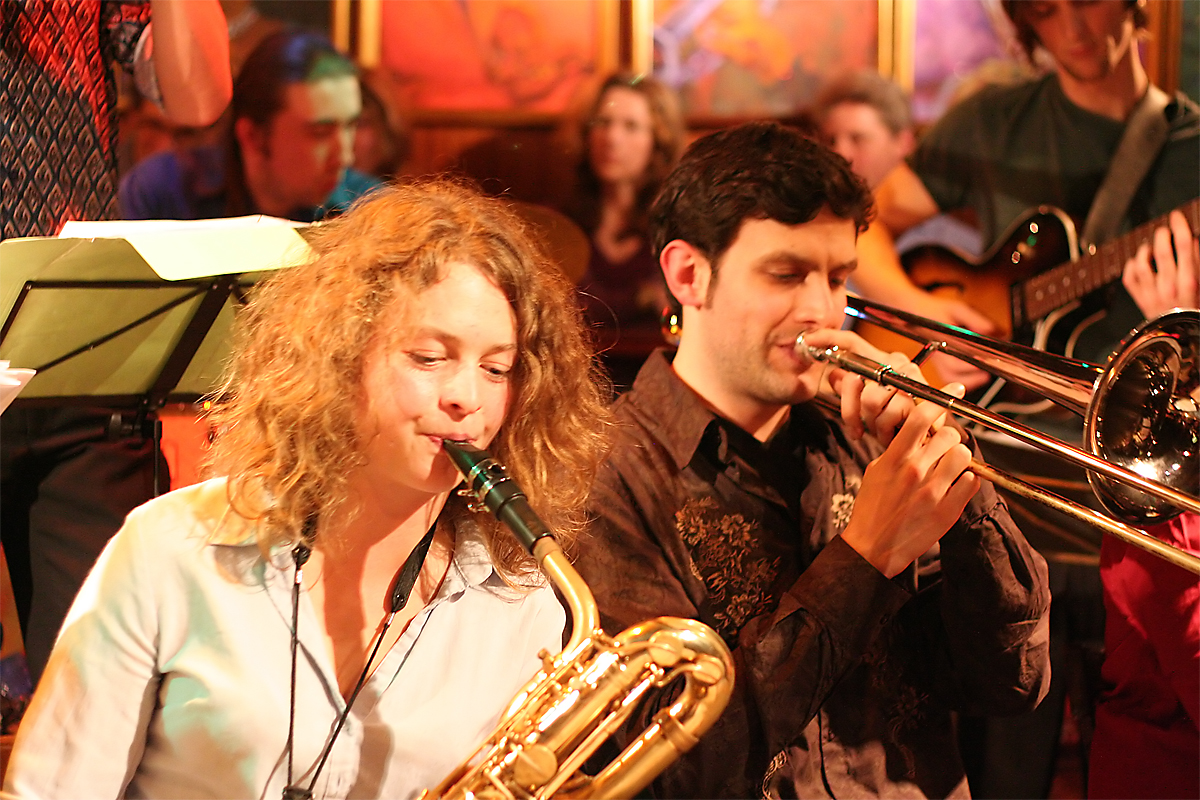
- Interactive map of Birdland
- Address: Gärtnerstraße 122; 20253 Hamburg; Germany
- Coordinates: 53.5784°N 9.9624°E
- Owner: Dieter Reichert
- Capacity: 150
- Type: Club
- Event: Jazz

Construction
- Opened: 1985
- Closed: 30 June 2013
- Reopened: 2014

Website
- jazzclub-birdland.de

Birdland is a jazz club in Hamburg. The basement club is located in the Eimsbüttel district on Gärtnerstraße. It was opened in 1985 by Dieter Reichert. The club was supported by Jazz Federation Hamburg e.V which organized the events and allowed its members to attend performances free of charge. The club accommodates audiences of 150 with seating for some 110. It has been described, as "much-needed addition to Hamburg's catalogue of venues for international and home-grown stars."

Birdland's programmes covers swing, mainstream jazz, modern jazz, Latin jazz, Dixieland, and avant-garde. Only live music is played. There are concerts several times a week. Once a week there is a jam session, in which beginners and music students played together with recognized jazz artists when they happened to be on tour. Once a month there is a vocal session.

The musicians who appeared at Birdland include Chet Baker, Art Blakey, Ray Brown, Rebekka Bakken, Tommy Flanagan, Johnny Griffin, Joe Henderson, Diana Krall, Brad Mehldau, Viktoria Tolstoy, and the brothers Branford and Wynton Marsalis. Recordings of performances at Birdland have been released on the ACT and Nagel-Heyer labels.

The club closed on 30 June 2013. It reopened on 2 October 2014.

== Recordings ==
- Harry Allen, A Night in Birdland Vol 1–2 (Nagel-Heyer, 1993)
- Jack Walrath & Ralph Reichert, Solidarity (ACT, 1996)
- Wolfgang Schlüter/Simon Nabatov/Charly Antolini, Swing Kids (ACT, 1996)
- Herb Ellis, Burnin'– Live at Birdland Hamburg 1998
- Clark Terry, Herr Ober (Nagel-Heyer, 2000)
- Randy Reinhart/Jesper Thilo Sextet, For Basie (Nagel Heyer, 2004)
- Ralph Reichert Quartett & Randy Sandke, Reflections (2007)
- Ken Peplowski & Jesper Thilo, Happy Together (Nagel-Heyer 2008)
