= The Songs Sinatra Sang =

Studio album by Carol Sloane
- Released: December 1996
- Recorded: March 1996
- Genre: Jazz
- Label: Concord Jazz
- Producers: John Burk; Allen Farnham

Carol Sloane chronology
The Songs Carmen Sang (1995)	The Songs Sinatra Sang (1996)	The Songs Ella & Louis Sang (1997)

The Songs Sinatra Sang is a studio album by American singer, Carol Sloane. It was released by Concord Jazz in December 1996 and contained 13 tracks that paid tribute to Frank Sinatra. Sloane was backed by a larger group of musicians for the album when compared to her previous releases and it received critical acclaim from publications like The Washington Post and the Jazz Times.

== Background ==
In the 1960s, Carol Sloane found success in jazz recording two albums for Columbia Records and playing at popular gigs. As her career was growing, it stalled due to the decline of jazz in the US. While she did record in Japan (where jazz had more popularity at the time), she mostly turned away from her music career until she recorded a series of albums with Contemporary Records and Concord Jazz. Among her releases were several tribute albums, including The Songs Sinatra Sang. The idea for the project came from Sloane's Japanese jazz fans who requested she would make a Frank Sinatra tribute album.

== Recording and content ==
The Songs Sinatra Sang was recorded in March 1996 and was co-produced by Allen Farnham and John Burk. Because Sloane's Japanese fans advocated for the project, Concord's Japanese company provided additional funding to hire a larger backing group for its recording. This allowed for the album to include two trumpet players, a trombonist, a pianist, two saxophonists, two bassists and a drum player. The project consisted of 13 tracks that were part of Sinatra's discography and repertoire. Among them was "In the Wee Small Hours of the Morning", "I've Got You Under My Skin" and "One for My Baby (and One More for the Road)". The album also features duets with some of the project's instrumentalists, including Bill Charlap on "You Make Me Feel So Young".

== Release and critical reception ==
The Songs Sinatra Sang was originally released by Concord Jazz in December 1996 and was offered as a compact disc (CD). A limited edition and remastered version was re-released in Japan in 2014 by Concord via a CD. The project received positive reviews following its release. Mike Joyce of The Washington Post praised Sloane's characteristic way of phrasing lyrics to make the sound different from Sinatra's versions. Joyce further wrote, "The level of communication that Sloane develops with the listener is a constant." Scott Yanow of AllMusic rated 4.5 out of 5 stars and also took notice of the individuality Sloane brought to each of Sinatra's tunes. Bill Bennett of the Jazz Times called Sloane "a wonderful singer" that lacked the notability she should have had. He also praised the group of musicians with Sloane, writing, "With so many of the ingredients having aged so well, the result is ready for immediate consumption." Biographer, Will Friedwald of the book A Biographical Guide to the Great Jazz and Pop Singers called it an "especially welcome" album and also called it a "first rate offering".

== Track listing ==
The Songs Sinatra Sang
No.	Title	Writer(s)	Length
1.	"I've Got You Under My Skin"	Cole Porter	3:50
2.	"In the Still of the Night"	Porter	3:46
3.	"One for My Baby"	Harold Arlen; Johnny Mercer	9:07
4.	"At Long Last Love"	Porter	4:11
5.	"I'll Be Around"	Alec Wilder	5:06
6.	"Fly Me to the Moon"	Bart Howard	3:40
7.	"In the Wee Small Hours of the Morning"	David Mann; Bob Hilliard	3:15
8.	"You Make Me Feel So Young"	Josef Myrow; Mack Gordon	4:12
9.	"The Night We Called It a Day"	Tom Adair; Matt Dennis	6:16
10.	"You Go to My Head"	J. Fred Coots; Haven Gillespie	5:41
11.	"I Fall in Love Too Easily"	Sammy Cahn; Jule Styne	3:45
12.	"The Best Is Yet to Come"	Cy Coleman; Carolyn Leigh	3:19
13.	"Young at Heart"	Johnny Richards; Leigh	4:13

== Personnel ==
All credits are adapted from the liner notes of The Songs Sinatra Sang.

Musical personnel

- Ben Brown – Bass
- Bill Charlap – Piano
- Bill Easley – Tenor, alto and soprano saxophones
- Greg Gisbert – Trumpet
- Dennis Mackrel – Drums
- Scott Robinson – Baritone and bass saxophones, bass clarinet
- Carol Sloane – Vocals
- Sean Smith – Bass
- Byron Stripling – Trumpet
- Steve Turre – Trombone
- Ron Vincent – Drums
- Frank Wess – Flute, tenor saxophone

Technical personnel

- John Burk – Executive producer
- Allen Farnham – Producer
- George Horn – Mastering
- Eric Stephen Jacobs – Photography
- Robert Smith – Assistant engineering, mixing
- Janet Sommer – Photography
- Allan Varner – Engineering and mixing
- Sandi Young – Art direction

== Release history ==
Release history and formats for The Songs Sinatra Sang
Region	Date	Format	Label	Ref.
Various	December 1996	Compact disc (CD)	Concord Jazz	
Japan	August 27, 2014	Compact disc (CD)	Concord Jazz (Limited Edition Series)	
Various	circa 2020	Music download; streaming	Concord Jazz	
