= Live at Birdland (Carol Sloane album) =

Live album by Carol Sloane
- Released: April 8, 2022
- Recorded: September 20–21, 2019
- Venue: Birdland
- Genre: Jazz
- Label: Clubb44
- Producer: Wayne Haun; Joel Moss; Mark D. Sendroff; Sharon Terrell

Carol Sloane chronology
We'll Meet Again (2010)	Live at Birdland (2022)

Live at Birdland is a live album by American singer, Carol Sloane. It was released on April 8, 2022, by Club44 Records and was the final album of Sloane's career. It had been recorded three years earlier at the Birdland jazz club. The collection of jazz tunes featured 12 titles from the Great American Songbook. It received a positive critical reception from several media outlets following its release.

== Background ==
Carol Sloane found success in the jazz field in the 1960s with two albums at Columbia Records and numerous television appearances. As the decade progressed, jazz fell out of favor with US audiences and Sloane's career slowed considerably. She took odd jobs on and off before being discovered again by Japanese audiences in the 1970s. She had a second career revival in the 1980s (this time in the US) with a series of jazz albums that brought her a newfound audience into the 2000s. Sloane stopped performing to care for her ailing husband, who eventually passed in 2014. Following his death, she had a desire to record one more album. With the help of an entertainment attorney, Sloane arranged for a live project to be recorded at New York's Birdland jazz club.

== Recording and content ==
Sloane gathered her own material for Live at Birdland. She also collaborated with pianist Mike Renzi to write arrangements for the project. The album was eventually recorded at the Birdland jazz club during two of her dates at the venue: September 19 and 20, 2019. It was co-produced by three separate people: Wayne Haun, Joel Moss, Mark D. Sendroff and Sharon Terrell. The album consisted of 12 tracks that were taken from the Great American Songbook such as "As Long as I Live", "You Were Meant for Me" and "You're Driving Me Crazy". Some songs were considered lesser-known material from the Great American Songbook such as the closing tune, "I'll Always Leave the Door a Little Open".

== Release and critical reception ==
Live at Birdland was released on April 8, 2022, by Clubb44 Records, which was nearly two years after its recording date. It was offered as both a compact disc (CD) and to digitally to sites like Apple Music. The project received a positive critical reaction from publications and music websites. John McDonough of DownBeat gave it a four-star rating. He praised Sloane's song selection and noticed a strong comfort level with the material. Stephen Mosher of BroadwayWorld also praised the album, writing, "It is a wealth of classic jazz entertainment from an artist who is to be treasured for a unique artistry informed by an impressive musical vocabulary and a clear intent at serving the art form of jazz, as well as the audience that appreciates it." Connor McCormick of the website Stage and Cinema wrote, "And even in September 2019 — age 82 at the time of this recording — she still wraps us in her oh-so-cool, refined, unpretentious, and earthy style."

The making of the album and the events leading up to it were the subject of the 2023 documentary Sloane: A Jazz Singer. The documentary was released following Sloane's death in January 2023. A total of four singles were released digitally following the album's release as well between 2022 and 2025: "Havin' Myself a Time" (2022), "I Don't Want to Walk Without You" (2022), "Two for the Road" (2023) and "As Long as I Live" (2025).

== Track listing ==
Live at Birdland (adapted from CD and digital versions)
No.	Title	Writer(s)	Length
1.	"Havin' Myself a Time"	Leo Robin; Ralph Rainger	4:36
2.	"Blue Turning Grey over You"	Andy Razaf; Fats Waller	5:57
3.	"I Don't Want to Walk Without You"	Frank Loesser; Jule Styne	6:13
4.	"As Long as I Live"	Ted Koehler; Harold Arlen	4:58
5.	"Glad to Be Unhappy/I Gotta Right to Sing the Blues"	Lorenz Hart; Richard Rodgers; Arlen; Koehler	7:05
6.	"If I Should Lose You"	Robin; Rainger	5:28
7.	"You Were Meant for Me"	Arthur Freed; Nacio Herb Brown	4:48
8.	"The Very Thought of You"	Ray Noble	6:55
9.	"You're Driving Me Crazy"	Walter Donaldson	8:23
10.	"Two for the Road"	Henry Mancini; Leslie Bricusse	6:13
11.	"Wrap Your Troubles in Dreams"	Harry Barris; Billy Moll; Koehler	4:23
12.	"I'll Always Leave the Door a Little Open"	Frank Underwood; Johnny Mandel; Richard Rodney Bennett	6:26

== Personnel ==
All credits are adapted from the liner notes of Live at Birdland.

Musical and technical personnel

- Scott Hamilton – Saxophone
- Wayne Haun – Executive producer
- Jay Leonhart – Bass
- Joel Moss – Producer
- Mike Renzi – Piano
- Mark D. Sendroff – Producer
- Carol Sloane – Vocals
- Sharon Terrell – Executive producer

== Release history ==
Release history and formats for Live at Birdland
Region	Date	Format	Label	Ref.
Various	April 8, 2022	Compact disc (CD); digital	Club44 Records	
