= Scotty Barnhart =

American jazz trumpeter (born 1964)

- Born: William Barnhart; October 27, 1964 (age 61); Atlanta, Georgia, U.S.
- Genres: Jazz
- Occupations: Musician; bandleader; educator
- Instrument: Trumpet
- Years active: 1990s–present
- Publisher: Hal Leonard
- Member of: Count Basie Orchestra
- Website: www.scottybarnhart.com

William "Scotty" Barnhart (born October 27, 1964) is an American jazz trumpeter. A three-time Grammy Award winner, he has played as a featured soloist with the Count Basie Orchestra since 1993. In September 2013, he was announced as the new director of the Basie Orchestra. He has multiple recordings with pianist Marcus Roberts, as well as recordings with Tony Bennett, Diana Krall, Ray Charles, and Tito Puente. His debut album, Say It Plain, released on Unity Music, features Clark Terry, Ellis Jr. and Wynton Marsalis, Marcus Roberts, Jamie Davis, and Etienne Charles; it achieved number 3 on the Jazz Charts. Also active as an educator and clinician, he is author of The World of Jazz Trumpet – A Comprehensive History and Practical Philosophy (published by Hal Leonard). He is a professor at the Florida State University College of Music.

He was born in Atlanta, Georgia, and was a member of the historic Ebenezer Baptist Church, where he was christened by Martin Luther King Jr.

== Discography ==
=== As leader ===
- Say It Plain (Unity Music, 2009)

With the Count Basie Orchestra

- Live at Birdland (Candid, 2021)
- Late Night Basie (Virgin, 2023)

=== As sideman ===
- Natalie Jacob, Sooner or Later (self-released, 2024)
- Gunhild Carling, Jazz Is My Lifestyle (self-released, 2024) – big band with strings

== See also ==
- Count Basie Orchestra
