= Carol Sloane Live at 30th Street =

Studio album by Carol Sloane
- Released: January 1963
- Studio: 30th Street Studios
- Genre: Jazz
- Label: Columbia
- Producer: Mike Berniker

Carol Sloane chronology
Out of the Blue (1962)	Carol Sloane Live at 30th Street (1963)	Sophisticated Lady (1977)

Carol Sloane Live at 30th Street is a studio album by American singer, Carol Sloane. It was released by Columbia Records in January 1963 and was the second studio album of her career. Consisting of 12 tracks, the project was actually recorded at Columbia's 30th Street Studios, which classifies it as a studio set. It received a mostly positive reception from writers, critics and publications following its release.

== Background, recording and content ==
Carol Sloane drew critical acclaim in her 1961 performance at the Newport Jazz Festival. From there, she was awarded a contract with Columbia Records that resulted in two critically-acclaimed albums, one of them being Carol Sloane Live at 30th Street. Despite its title, the project was actually a studio collection recorded at Columbia's 30th Street Studios in New York City, with a live audience that was invited to the recording session. Produced by Mike Berniker, the project consisted of 12 tracks that were originally show tunes and American standards. Examples of this included "In a Sentimental Mood" and "My Melancholy Baby".

== Release and critical reception ==
Carol Sloane Live at 30th Street was one of 28 albums released in January 1963 by Columbia Records. It was offered originally as a vinyl LP in either mono or stereo formats and was the second album of Sloane's career. Live at 30th Street was given a mostly positive critical reception. Billboard gave it a four-star rating while AllMusic gave it a three-star rating. Alyn Shipton of Jazzwise also gave it a three-star rating when reviewing it as part of the CD compilation Out of the Blue/Live at 30th Street. Cash Box named it one of its "Jazz Picks of the Week" in its January 19, 1963 issue and called it a "swinging session of jazz-flavored standards" and "a potent jazz vocal offering." Douglass Watt of The New Yorker found Sloane's vocals "impressive" but also wrote, "her style is still a bit too studied to win me over entirely, I’m afraid, but her musical ideas are solid, and she demonstrates good taste in her choice of songs."

== Track listing ==
Details taken from the original 1963 liner notes may differ from other sources. Song length was not included in the original liner notes, therefore song lengths are taken from the 2014 compilation reissue Out of the Blue/Live at 30th Street.

Side one
No.	Title	Writer(s)	Length
1.	"Chicago"	Fred Fisher	2:25
2.	"Love Walked In"	Ira Gershwin; George Gershwin	2:31
3.	"Spring Is Here"	Lorenz Hart; Richard Rodgers	3:41
4.	"Taking a Chance on Love"	Vernon Duke; Ted Fetter; John Latouche	1:58
5.	"My Melancholy Baby"	George Norton; Ernie Burnett	2:26
6.	"On the Street Where You Live"	Alan Jay Lerner; Frederick Loewe	2:36

Side two
No.	Title	Writer(s)	Length
1.	"Basin Street Blues"	Spencer Williams	3:06
2.	"In a Sentimental Mood"	Duke Ellington; Manny Kurtz	3:39
3.	"Don't Get Around Much Anymore"	Bob Russell; Ellington	2:12
4.	"Never Never Land"	Jule Styne; Comden; Green	2:49
5.	"Stars Fell on Alabama"	Mitchell Parish; Frank Perkins	1:58
6.	"It Never Entered My Mind"	Hart; Rodgers	2:50

== Personnel ==
All credits are taken from both the original 1963 liner notes and the 2014 compilation reissue Out of the Blue/Live at 30th Street.

Musical and technical personnel

- Mike Berniker – Producer
- George Duvivier – Bass
- Sol Gubin – Drums
- Don Hunstein – Photography
- Bucky Pizzarelli – Guitar
- Bill Rubenbstein – Piano
- Carol Sloane – Vocals

== Release history ==
Release history and formats for Carol Sloane Live at 30th Street
Region	Date	Format	Label	Ref.
Various	January 1963	LP mono; LP stereo	Columbia Records	
Japan	1977	LP stereo	CBS Records International/Sony	
Japan	1986–2015	Compact disc (CD)	CBS Records International/Sony	
Spain	2014	Compact disc (CD)	Fresh Sound	
