= Love You Madly (album) =

Studio album by Carol Sloane
- Released: June 1989
- Recorded: October 1988
- Studio: Home Base Recording
- Genre: Jazz
- Label: Contemporary
- Producer: Helen Keane

Carol Sloane chronology
Early Hours (1987)	Love You Madly (1989)	The Real Thing (1990)

Love You Madly is a studio album by American singer, Carol Sloane. It was released in June 1989 by Contemporary Records and was her first album with the label. The 13-track jazz collection contained American standards and lesser-known songs from notable composers. It received a positive reception from critics and publications following its release.

== Background, recording and content ==
Carol Sloane performed at the 1961 Newport Jazz Festival and her singing was met with critical acclaim, followed by a two-album contract with Columbia Records. When jazz fell out of favor in the US, Sloane recorded in Japan and also worked outside the music industry. She returned in the 1980s and signed with Contemporary Records. Love You Madly was among her Contemporary releases and was cut at the Home Base Recording Studio in New York City in October 1988. The project was produced by Helen Keane and featured jazz sidemen like flugelhorn player Art Farmer and pianist Kenny Barron. The project consisted of 13 tracks featuring American standards and lesser-known tracks. Among them was a cover of The Beatles's "Norwegian Wood". Other songs on the album were described by the liner notes as being songs that told stories rather be hidden behind electric instrumentation.

== Release and critical reception ==
Love You Madly was released in June 1989 by Contemporary Records and was her first album with the label. It was offered in three separate formats: a vinyl LP, a cassette or as a compact disc (CD). It was given critical acclaim upon its release from newspapers and other publications. Cashbox found the project to showcase Sloane as both "smooth" and "swinging" in a way that will "garner attention". Scott Yanow of AllMusic rated it 4.5 out of 5 stars and called it "a strong effort that finds Carol Sloane in prime form." Jack Fuller of the Chicago Tribune noticed a confidence in Sloane alongside the session players that created a "shared improvisation" throughout the album. The New York Times also highlighted a shared musicality between Sloane and the instrumentalists, while also comparing her voice to Sarah Vaughan's. The Washington Post found it to have "great songs" and called Sloane an "underrated" artist.

== Track listing ==
Love You Madly
No.	Title	Writer(s)	Length
1.	"Love You Madly"	Duke Ellington	3:32
2.	"I Could Have Told You So"	Jimmy Van Heusen; Carl Sigman	5:13
3.	"My Gentleman Friend"	Arnold B. Horwitt; Richard Lewine	3:54
4.	"For All We Know"	Fred Karlin; Arthur James; Robb Wilson	4:52
5.	"While We're Young"	Alec Wilder; Bill Engvick	3:09
6.	"Norwegian Wood"	Lennon-McCartney	3:17
7.	"That Ole Devil Called Love"	Allan Roberts; Doris Fisher	4:48
8.	"I'm Glad There Is You"	Jimmy Dorsey; Paul Madeira	5:39
9.	"I Wish I'd Met You"	Johnny Mandel; Richard Bennett; Franklin Underwood	4:32
10.	"Someday You'll Be Sorry"	Louis Armstrong	3:37
11.	"Inside a Silent Tear"	Blossom Dearie; Mahriah Blackwolf	3:32
12.	"Getting Some Fun Out of Life"	Joe Burke; Edgar Leslie	2:53
13.	"My Foolish Heart"	Ned Washington; Victor Young	3:59

== Personnel ==
All credits are adapted from the liner notes of Love You Madly

Musical personnel

- Kenny Barron – Piano
- Richard Rodney Bennett – Piano (track 6)
- Kenny Burrell – Guitar
- Art Farmer – Flugelhorn
- Clifford Jordan – Tenor saxophone
- Rufus Reid – Acoustic bass
- Carol Sloane – Vocals
- Akira Tana – Drums

Technical personnel

- Eric Behrend – Engineer
- Richard Rodney Bennett – Arrangements (tracks 1-5; 7-13)
- Phil Carroll – Art direction
- David Gahr – Photography
- George Horn – Mastering
- Helen Keane – Producer
- Danny Kopelson – Remix
- Paul Montgomery – Arrangements (track 6)
- Scott Noll – Recorder

== Release history ==
Release history and formats for Love You Madly
Region	Date	Format	Label	Ref.
United States	June 1989	Vinyl LP; Compact disc (CD); cassette	Contemporary Records	
Spain	2004	Compact disc	Contemporary Records; Jazz Voice	
Various	circa 2020	Music download; streaming	Contemporary Records; Concord Records	
