= When I Look in Your Eyes (Carol Sloane album) =

Studio album by Carol Sloane
- Released: September 1994
- Recorded: June 1994
- Studio: Penny Lane Studios
- Genre: Jazz
- Label: Concord Jazz
- Producer: John Burk

Carol Sloane chronology
Sweet & Slow (1993)	When I Look in Your Eyes (1994)	The Songs Carmen Sang (1995)

When I Look in Your Eyes is a studio album by American singer, Carol Sloane. It was released by the Concord Jazz label in September 1994 and was her third collection with the company. The jazz product contained 13 songs mostly music from the Great American Songbook, including a cover of June Christy's "Something Cool". It received critical acclaim from several publications including AllMusic and The New York Times.

== Background, recording and content ==
Carol Sloane rose to success in the jazz field after a critically acclaimed performance at the 1961 Newport Jazz Festival. From there, Columbia Records signed her to a contract and she recorded two albums. As the 1960s progressed, jazz lost its American audience and found more attention in Japan where Sloane recorded in the 1970s and 1980s. However, her career had stalled considerably and she worked jobs outside music until she was agreed to record for Concord Jazz in the 1990s. The label restored her career and When I Look in Your Eyes was her third product for the label. The project was recorded in June 1994 at Penny Lane Studios, located in New York City. The sessions were produced by John Burk. When I Look in Your Eyes contained 13 songs that feature uptempo swing numbers but mostly contains ballads that come from the Great American Songbook. This includes June Christy's "Something Cool" while the title track originally comes from Doctor Doolittle.

== Release and critical reception ==
When I Look in Your Eyes was released by Concord Jazz in September 1994 and was offered as a compact disc (CD). It received critical acclaim following its release. James Gavin of The New York Times positively compared her to Ella Fitzgerald and believed her to carry on her musical legacy. He also wrote, "To these she adds a relaxed, sexy air and a knack for drama that never goes overboard." The United Press International instead found Sloane to carry Carmen McRae's musical legacy for appreciating strong lyrics. The publication also wrote, "On each of the 13 songs on 'When I Look in Your Eyes,' her vocal clarity, spellbinding phrasing, uncanny timing and the sense that she has lived each and every lyric are evident." Biographer, Will Friedwald, found Sloane's Concord albums (including When I Look in Your Eyes) to be "the most consistently excellent and rewarding work of Sloane's career". Scott Yanow of AllMusic called the album "one of Carol Sloane's finest recordings" for being a characteristic song interpreter. He also praised the project's mixture of uptempo and ballad tracks.

== Track listing ==
When I Look in Your Eyes
No.	Title	Writer(s)	Length
1.	"Give Me the Simple Life"	Rube Bloom; Harry Ruby	4:14
2.	"Isn't This a Lovely Day"	Irving Berlin	4:12
3.	"Midnight Sun"	Lionel Hampton; Johnny Mercer; Sonny Burke	7:30
4.	"Take Your Shoes Off, Baby"	Gene Austin	3:19
5.	"I Didn't Know About You"	Duke Ellington; Bob Russell	5:28
6.	"Soon"	George Gershwin; Ira Gershwin	3:44
7.	"Old Devil Moon"	Yip Harburg; Burton Lane	4:42
8.	"Let's Face the Music and Dance"	Berlin	6:48
9.	"Something Cool"	Billy Barnes	5:19
10.	"Tulip or Turnip"	Ellington; Don George	2:49
11.	"I Was Telling Him About You"	Morris Charlap; George	4:34
12.	"When I Look in Your Eyes"	Leslie Bricusse	5:29
13.	"Will You Still Be Mine?"	Matt Dennis; Thomas Adair	3:11

== Personnel ==
All credits are adapted from the liner notes of When I Look in Your Eyes.

Musical personnel

- Howard Alden – Guitar
- Bill Charlap – Piano
- Steve Gilmore – Bass
- Carol Sloane – Vocals
- Ron Vincent – Drums
- Frank Wess – Flute, tenor saxophone

Technical personnel

- Chris Albertson – Liner notes
- Abby Andrews – Art direction
- John Burk – Producer
- Phil Edwards – Engineer, remixing
- John McDonald – Assistant engineer
- Herb Snitzer – Photography
- Alan Varner – Recorder, engineer

== Release history ==
Release history and formats for When I Look in Your Eyes
Region	Date	Format	Label	Ref.
Various	September 1994	Compact disc (CD)	Concord Jazz	
Various	circa 2020	Music download; streaming	Concord Jazz	
