= The Real Thing (Carol Sloane album) =

Studio album by Carol Sloane
- Released: December 1990
- Recorded: May 1990
- Studio: Home Base Studio
- Genre: Jazz
- Label: Contemporary
- Producer: Helen Keane

Carol Sloane chronology
Love You Madly (1989)	The Real Thing (1990)	Heart's Desire (1992)

The Real Thing is a studio album by American singer, Carol Sloane. It was released in December 1990 by Contemporary Records and was her second album with the label. The jazz project contained 13 tracks of American standards reinterpreted by Sloane. It received critical acclaim from publications like Billboard and AllMusic.

== Background, recording and content ==
Carol Sloane was met with critical acclaim at her 1961 performance in the Newport Jazz Festival and she soon had a contract with Columbia Records. However, jazz declined in popularity with US audiences and Sloane performed in Japan where the genre was still appreciated. Her career then stalled for a time until the 1980s when she began recording again for Contemporary Records. The Real Thing was her second album made for the label and was cut at the Home Base Studio in New York City. Sessions were held in May 1990 and were produced by Helen Keane. The Real Thing contained a total of 13 tracks consisting mostly of American standards such as "I Can't Believe That You're in Love with Me", "Something to Live For" and a medley of "Makin' Whoopee"/"The Glory of Love". The medley also featured Grady Tate performing a vocal duet with Sloane.

== Release and critical reception ==
The Real Thing was released by Contemporary Records in December 1990 and was offered in three separate formats: a vinyl LP, a compact disc (CD) or as a cassette. It received a positive response from critics following its release. Billboard called it "a refreshing set of new performances" with "brightly selected repertoire". Cashbox compared Sloane's vocals to Carmen McRae's, highlighting her voice's "richness" and "depth" but also believed her performance lacked some of McRae's "charisma". John Marcille of The Daily Gazette noticed that Sloane seemed more "in control" of her music with The Real Thing (and with her previous Contemporary release Love You Madly). The newspaper praised her versions of the album's tracks, finding them to be "emotional but not overwrought". Scott Yanow of AllMusic rated it four out of five stars, praising her voice throughout the collection and called it "one of Carol Sloane's better recordings".

== Track listing ==
The Real Thing
No.	Title	Writer(s)	Length
1.	"I Can't Believe That You're in Love with Me"	Clarence Gaskill; Jimmy McHugh	4:01
2.	"The Real Thing"	Gerry Mulligan; Mel Tormé	4:51
3.	"Just A-Sittin' and A-Rockin'"	Billy Strayhorn; Lee Gaines; Duke Ellington	5:38
4.	"Early Autumn"	Ralph Burns; Woody Herman; Johnny Mercer	5:38
5.	"I Wish I Knew"	Mack Gordon; Harry Warren	3:37
6.	"Makin' Whoopee/The Glory of Love" (with Grady Tate)	Gus Kahn; Walter Donaldson; Billy Hill	4:24
7.	"Something to Live For"	Ellington; Billy Strayhorn	6:42
8.	"I Hear Music"	Burton Lane; Frank Loesser	2:48
9.	"Too Late Now"	Lane	3:56
10.	"My Blue Heaven"	Donaldson; George A. Whiting	3:43
11.	"You're Nearer"	Lorenz Hart; Richard Rodgers	3:22
12.	"I'll Take Romance"	Oscar Hammerstein II; Ben Oakland	3:19
13.	"Maybe You'll Be There"	Rube Bloom; Sammy Gallop	4:20

== Personnel ==
All credits are adapted from the liner notes of The Real Thing.

Musical personnel

- Rufus Reid – Acoustic guitar
- Mike Renzi – Piano, synthesizer
- Carol Sloane – Vocals
- Grady Tate – Drums, vocals (track 6)
- Phil Woods – Clarinet, alto saxophone

Technical personnel

- Phil Bray – Photography (back cover)
- Phil Carroll – Art direction
- George Horn – Mastering
- Helen Keane – Producer
- Danny Kopelson – Mixing
- Frank Lindner – Photography (front cover)
- Lance Neal – Recording assistant
- Scott Noll – Recorder
- Jamie Putman – Design
- Doug Ramsey – Liner notes
- Mike Renzi – Arrangements

== Release history ==
Release history and formats for The Real Thing
Region	Date	Format	Label	Ref.
United States	December 1990	Vinyl LP; Compact disc (CD); cassette	Contemporary Records	
Japan	1991	Compact disc (CD)	Contemporary Records	
Various	circa 2020	Music download; streaming	Contemporary Records; Concord Records	
