= Birdland (band) =

British rock band

Background information
- Origin: Birmingham, UK
- Years active: 1988–1993, 2010
- Label: Lazy
- Past members: Robert Vincent; Lizzy Vincent; Syd Rogers; Gene Kale

Birdland were a British rock band, active between 1988 and 1993. Their debut single, "Hollow Heart", reached No. 1 on the UK Indie Chart.

== History ==
Birdland were formed in 1988 in Birmingham, UK, by the brothers Robert (vocals) and Lee Vincent (guitar), who had previously released records and toured in the glam rock band Zodiac Motel (1984–1988). The other band members were Syd Rogers (bass) and Gene Kale (drums).

Birdland's debut single, "Hollow Heart", was released on Lazy Records. It reached No. 1 in the UK Indie Chart. The band generated a lot of attention in the British music press. The band released four further singles: "Paradise", "Sleep with Me", "Everybody Needs Somebody", and "Rock n Roll Nigger", all of which were No. 1 UK independent singles. "Sleep With Me" also reached the Top 40 in the UK singles chart (with the video being shown on Top of the Pops). They released their eponymously titled debut album in 1991.

After the album's release, problems with management and inner band disagreement forced the band to split up. They briefly reunited in 2011 and streamed a new demo.

== Discography ==
=== Studio albums ===
- 1991: Birdland – UK No. 44

=== Live albums ===
- 1989: Semi Official Live Album

=== Singles ===
- 1989: "Hollow Heart" – UK singles chart No. 70
- 1989: "Paradise" – UK singles chart No. 70
- 1989: "Live"
- 1990: "Sleep With Me" – UK Indie Chart No. 1, UK singles chart No. 32
- 1990: "Rock N Roll Nigger" – UK singles chart No. 47
- 1991: "Everybody Needs Somebody" – UK singles chart No. 44
- 1991: "Wake Up Freedom"
- 1991: "Beat Me Like A Star"
- 1992: "She Belongs To Me"
