= Live at Birdland (Count Basie Orchestra album) =

Live album by the Count Basie Orchestra
- Released: September 17, 2021
- Recorded: January 15–18, 2020
- Venues: Birdland, New York City
- Genres: Jazz; swing; big band
- Length: 2:26:28
- Labels: Candid; CCD 30072
- Producer: Sam Beler

Live at Birdland is a live album by the Count Basie Orchestra, recorded at the Birdland jazz club in New York City in 2020 and released by Candid Records on September 17, 2021. It takes inspiration from the band's original 1961 date, Basie at Birdland. Under the direction of Scotty Barnhart, the album includes a number of familiar Count Basie charts and features soloists on each of its 33 tracks.

== Reception ==
John White of Jazz Journal was considerably positive, writing that the album "offered a mixture of 'New Testament' Basie favourites with some surprising additions ... [which] retain the flavour of the originals." He added, "The band can (and does) explode on some familiar (but adapted) charts. ... Pearson, Doug Lawrence and Barnhart turn in memorable solos, while the band provides an initial shouting and then a shaded down backing." However, he concluded that the album "has considerable merits, but minus Basie himself is rather like 'The Marx Brothers' minus Groucho – not quite authentic."

Matt Silver, writing for WRTI, stated, "There's not that much that's new here, not that much that could be branded as innovative – whatever that increasingly nebulous but ubiquitous merit badge even means. And maybe that’s why this album is, musically and conceptually, refreshing."

== Track listing ==
Disc one
| No. | Title | Writer(s) | Length |
|---|---|---|---|
| 1. | "Introduction" | | 0:17 |
| 2. | "The Kid from Red Bank" | Neal Hefti | 3:13 |
| 3. | "Who, Me?" | Frank Foster | 5:10 |
| 4. | "Way Out Basie" | Ernie Wilkins | 5:02 |
| 5. | "In the Wee Small Hours of the Morning" | David Mann; Bob Hilliard | 6:11 |
| 6. | "Doodle Oodle" | Billy Byers | 2:53 |
| 7. | "Four Five Six" | Foster | 8:30 |
| 8. | "Basie Power" | Wilkins | 4:06 |
| 9. | "Honeysuckle Rose" | Fats Waller; Andy Razaf | 3:22 |
| 10. | "Only The Young" | Richard Ahlert; Marvin Fisher | 4:58 |
| 11. | "I Can't Give You Anything But Love" | Jimmy McHugh; Dorothy Fields | 3:06 |
| 12. | "Easin' It" | Foster | 7:23 |
| 13. | "What's New" | Bob Haggart; Johnny Burke | 5:09 |
| 14. | "Kansas City Shout" | Wilkins | 3:33 |
| 15. | "How Do You Keep the Music Playing" | Michel Legrand; Alan Bergman; Marilyn Bergman | 5:07 |
| 16. | "Basie" | Wilkins | 4:18 |
| 17. | "One O'Clock Jump" | Count Basie | 3:50 |
| Total length: | | | 72:18 |

Disc two
| No. | Title | Writer(s) | Length |
|---|---|---|---|
| 1. | "The Wind Machine" | Sammy Nestico | 3:23 |
| 2. | "April in Paris" | Vernon Duke; Yip Harburg | 3:31 |
| 3. | "There Will Never Be Another You" | Harry Warren; Mack Gordon | 2:48 |
| 4. | "I've Grown Accustomed to Her Face" | Frederick Loewe; Alan Jay Lerner | 4:13 |
| 5. | "I Needs to Be Bee'd With" | Quincy Jones | 5:23 |
| 6. | "Flute Juice" | Wilkins | 3:53 |
| 7. | "Moten Swing" | Bennie Moten | 5:33 |
| 8. | "Blues in Hoss' Flat" | Foster | 8:15 |
| 9. | "Once in a While" | Michael Edwards; Bud Green | 4:17 |
| 10. | "Five O'Clock in the Morning" | Basie; Joe Williams | 3:14 |
| 11. | "Shiny Stockings" | Foster | 5:36 |
| 12. | "What Kind of Fool Am I" | Anthony Newley; Leslie Bricusse | 3:34 |
| 13. | "'Deed I Do" | Fred Rose; Walter Hirsch | 2:42 |
| 14. | "From One to Another" | Thad Jones | 10:56 |
| 15. | "Whirly Bird" | Hefti | 5:33 |
| 16. | "One O'Clock Jump (Short)" | Basie | 1:19 |
| Total length: | | | 74:10 2:26:28 |

== Personnel ==
- Scotty Barnhart – director, trumpet
- David Glasser (lead), Markus Howell – alto saxophone, flute
- Doug Lawrence, Doug Miller – tenor saxophone
- Joshua Lee – baritone saxophone
- Frank Green (lead), Shawn Edmonds, Endre Rice, Brandon Lee – trumpet
- David Keim (lead), Clarence Hanks, Mark Williams – trombone
- Alvin Walker – bass trombone
- Glen Pearson – piano
- Will Matthews – guitar
- Trevor Ware – double bass
- Robert "B. T." Boone Jr., Butch Miles (11, 12) – drums
- Carmen Bradford, Jamie Davis – vocals
- Sam Beler – executive producer

== See also ==
- Basie at Birdland
