= The Songs Carmen Sang =

Studio album by Carol Sloane with Phil Woods
- Released: August 1995
- Recorded: March 1995
- Studio: Sound On Recording Inc.
- Genre: Jazz
- Label: Concord Jazz
- Producer: John Burk; Allen Farnham; Carol Sloane

Carol Sloane chronology
When I Look in Your Eyes (1994)	The Songs Carmen Sang (1995)	The Songs Sinatra Sang (1996)

Phil Woods chronology
Plays the Music of Jim McNeely (1995)	The Songs Carmen Sang (1995)	Another Time, Another Place (1996)

The Songs Carmen Sang is a studio album by American singer, Carol Sloane. It was released in August 1995 by Concord Jazz and was a tribute collection to her friend, Carmen McRae. The jazz album contained 13 songs either identified with McRae or personal favorites of hers. It received a positive critical response from several publications.

== Background ==
Carol Sloane began her career recording at Columbia Records in 1962 and had some moderate success in the jazz field. However, as musical tastes changed, Sloane's career stalled until it was relaunched in the 1980s by Contemporary Records (and later Concord Jazz) with a series of albums, including The Songs Carmen Sang. Carmen McRae was a jazz idol of Sloane's and the pair later became good friends in the 1980s. To pay tribute to her friend, Sloane decided to make a tribute album dedicated to McRae following her death from emphysema in 1994. In an interview with the Sun Journal newspaper, Sloane believed the album to be "very special" to her and also made her emotional if she chose to listen to it.

== Recording and content ==
The Songs Carmen Sang was recorded in March 1995 at the Sound On Recording Studio, Inc. in New York City. The album was co-produced by John Burk, Allen Farnham and Sloane herself. It consisted of 13 tracks, all given dual credit to instrumentalist Phil Woods. All of the tunes are American standards with the exception of the lesser-known "Cloudy Morning". The songs chosen for the project were considered favorites of McRae's but were not "identified with her", according to AllMusic. At the end of the recording, McRae's voice can be heard on a message she originally left on Sloane's answering machine praising one of her recent albums.

== Release, critical reception and promotion ==
The Songs Carmen Sang was released by Concord Jazz in August 1995 and was her fourth album with the label. It was distributed as a compact disc (CD). The project received mostly a positive critical response. Biographer, Will Friedwald, of the book A Biographical Guide to the Great Jazz and Pop Singers found McRae's tribute a "first rate" album and praised Sloane for making the songs uniquely hers. AllMusic's Scott Yanow rated it four stars and called it an "excellent set". He also found that Sloane at times sounded closer in style to that of Ella Fitzgerald while also standing out as her own artist. CD Review also gave the album a positive response, highlighting Sloane's voice as both "elegantly swinging and tasteful". The album received promotion when Sloane opened at the 1995 Newport Jazz Festival singing songs from the album.

== Track listing ==
The Songs Carmen Sang
No.	Title	Writer(s)	Length
1.	"I'm Gonna Lock My Heart (And Throw Away the Key)"	Jimmy Eaton; Terry Shand	3:01
2.	"What Can I Say (After I Say I'm Sorry)"	Walter Donaldson; Abe Lyman	4:00
3.	"If the Moon Turns Green"	Phil Coates; Bernie Hanighen	4:02
4.	"Sunday"	Chester Conn; Jule Styne; Bennie Krueger; Ned Miller	6:13
5.	"Suppertime"	Irving Berlin	3:15
6.	"Just You, Just Me"	Jesse Greer; Raymond Klages	3:44
7.	"It's Like Reaching for the Moon"	Al Lewis; Gerald Marqusee; Al Sherman	5:33
8.	"What a Little Moonlight Can Do"	Harry Woods	4:13
9.	"Cloudy Morning"	Marian Fischer; Joe McCarthy, Jr.	5:11
10.	"Autumn Nocturne"	Josef Myrow; Kim Gannon	5:59
11.	"That Old Black Magic"	Harold Arlen; Johnny Mercer	4:52
12.	"The Folks Who Live on the Hill"	Jerome Kern; Oscar Hammerstein II	7:55
13.	"I'm an Errand Girl for Rhythm"	Nat King Cole	5:20

== Personnel ==
All credits are adapted from the liner notes of The Songs Carmen Sang.

Musical personnel

- Bill Charlap – Piano
- Michael Moore – Bass
- Carol Sloane – Vocals
- Phil Woods – Clarinet, Alto saxophone
- Ron Vincent – Drums

Technical personnel

- Abby Andrews – Art direction
- John Burk – Executive producer
- Phil Edwards – Assembly
- Allan Farnham – Producer
- David Emke – Assistant engineer
- George Horn – Mastering
- Carol Sloane – Producer
- Kathleen Vance – Production coordination
- Alan Varner – Engineering, mixing

== Release history ==
Release history and formats for The Songs Carmen Sang
Region	Date	Format	Label	Ref.
Various	August 1995	Compact disc (CD)	Concord Jazz	
Various	circa 2020	Music download; streaming	Concord Jazz	
