= Live at Birdland (Lester Young album) =

Studio album by Lester Young
- Released: 2007
- Recorded: 1953 and 1956
- Genre: Jazz
- Length: 71:53
- Label: ESP-Disk

Professional ratings
Review scores
Source	Rating
Allmusic	link

Live at Birdland is a collection of live recordings made in 1953 and 1956 at New York's Birdland.

== Track listing ==
1. "Oh, Lady Be Good!" (7:47)
2. "A Foggy Day" (8:10)
3. "In a Little Spanish Town" 7:39
4. "Lester Leaps In" (6:08))
5. Theme: "Lullaby of Birdland" (0:55)
6. Announcement (0:07)
7. "Lester Leaps In" (6:07)
8. Announcement 0:24
9. "Polkadots and Moonbeams" (4:14)
10. "Up ‘n Adam" (6:08)
11. "In a Little Spanish Town" (3:20)
12. Theme: "Lullaby of Birdland" (0:47)
13. Announcement (0:10)
14. "Three Little Words" (6:46)
15. Lester and Announcer Speak (0:35)
16. "These Foolish Things" (4:23)
17. Announcement (0:10)
18. "Blues in G" (5:45)
19. "Tea for Two" (2:18)

== Personnel ==
- Lester Young: tenor saxophone
- Jesse Drakes: trumpet
- Earl Knight: piano
- Aaron Bell: bass
- Lee Abrahams: percussion
- Count Basie Orchestra

== Sources ==
Gridley, Mark C. Jazz Styles: History & Analysis. 9th N.J.: Prentice Hall, 2006. Print.
