= Out of the Blue (Carol Sloane album) =

Studio album by Carol Sloane
- Released: May 1962
- Recorded: November – December 1961
- Studio: 30th Street Studios
- Genre: Jazz
- Label: Columbia
- Producer: Mike Berniker

Carol Sloane chronology
Out of the Blue (1962)	Carol Sloane Live at 30th Street (1963)

Singles from Out of the Blue
- 1. "I Want You to Be the First One to Know" Released: February 1962

Out of the Blue is a studio album by American singer Carol Sloane. It was released in May 1962 by Columbia Records and was her debut studio album. The album contained 11 tracks performed mostly in a ballad style, including "Little Girl Blue", a song that helped Sloane gain notoriety. The collection received positive reception from Billboard, Cash Box and AllMusic.

== Background, recording and content ==
Carol Sloane first gained notoriety after performing at the 1961 Newport Jazz Festival, which led to albums that were released by Columbia Records, with her first being Out of the Blue. The project was recorded at 30th Street Studios in New York City between November and December 1961. It was produced by Mike Berniker and featured arrangements by Bill Finegan. The original album consisted of 11 tracks, opening with "Little Girl Blue", the song that Sloane originally performed at the Newport Jazz Festival in 1961. Remaining tracks mostly consisted of ballads, while some featured uptempo swing arrangements. Another track, "My Ship", was said to be a favorite of Sloane's, according to the original liner notes.

== Releases and critical reception ==
Out of the Blue was originally released by Columbia Records (issued by CBS in the UK) in May 1962 and was her debut studio album. It was originally offered as a vinyl LP in either mono or stereo formats. It was later re-released on a compact disc in the United States by Koch Jazz, featuring three additional tracks. Among its newer tracks was "I Want You to Be the First One to Know", which was originally spawned as a single by Columbia in February 1962. Out of the Blue received critical acclaim following its release. Billboard named it one of its "Special Merit Picks" and wrote, "The lass has an individuality that projects dramatic intensity and poignant longing ballads and a fine beat on middle tempo tunes." Cash Box also praised the product, writing, "The lark's impressive wide-range voice fares equally well on ballads as on swingin' uptempo items." AllMusic's Scott Yanow reviewed its CD reissue, rating it 4.5 out of five stars. Yanow noted comparisons to Ella Fitzgerald's voice at times and concluded, "Carol Sloane was a highly appealing singer from the start."

== Track listing ==
Side one
No.	Title	Writer(s)	Length
1.	"Prelude to a Kiss"	Duke Ellington; Irving Gordon; Irving Mills	4:19
2.	"Aren't You Glad You're You"	Johnny Burke; Jimmy Van Heusen	2:01
3.	"Little Girl Blue"	Lorenz Hart; Richard Rodgers	3:53
4.	"Who Cares"	Ira Gershwin; George Gershwin	2:30
5.	"My Ship"	I. Gershwin; Kurt Weill	2:52

Side two
No.	Title	Writer(s)	Length
1.	"Will You Still Be Mine"	Matt Dennis; Tom Adair	2:14
2.	"The More I See You"	Harry Warren; Mack Gordon	2:34
3.	"Deep Purple"	Mitchell Parish; Peter DeRose	3:10
4.	"Life Is Just a Bowl of Cherries"	Lew Brown; Ray Henderson	1:55
5.	"My Silent Love"	Dana Suesse; Edward Heyman	3:30
6.	"Night and Day"	Cole Porter	2:01

CD Reissue Bonus Tracks
No.	Title	Writer(s)	Length
12.	"I Want You To Be The First One To Know"	Arthur Siegel; June Carroll	2:35
13.	"April in My Heart"	Helen Meinardi; Hoagy Carmichael	3:29

== Personnel ==
All credits are adapted from the CD liner notes of Out of the Blue

Musical personnel

- Bob Brookmeyer – Valve trombone
- Art Davis – Bass
- George Duvivier – Bass
- Barry Galbraith – Guitar
- Jim Hall – Guitar
- Al Klink – Flute
- Bernie Leighton – Piano
- Walter Perkins – Drums
- Carol Sloane – Vocals
- Clark Terry – Flugelhorn
- Nick Travis – Trumpet

Technical personnel

- Mike Berniker – Producer
- Teddy Brosnan – Engineer
- Bill Finegan – Arrangements, conductor
- Andrew Kagan – Design
- Frank Laico – Engineer
- Henry Parker – Photography
- Fred Plaut – Engineer
- Ken Robertson – Mixing
- George T. Simon – Liner notes

== Release history ==
Release history and formats for Out of the Blue
Region	Date	Format	Label	Ref.
Various	May 1962	LP mono; LP stereo	Columbia Records; CBS Records	
Various	1986	LP; CD	CBS Records; Sony	
United States	April 23, 1996	CD	Koch Jazz	
Japan	November 11, 2015	CD	Sony Records International	
