= Ken Peplowski =

American jazz clarinetist and saxophonist (1959–2026)

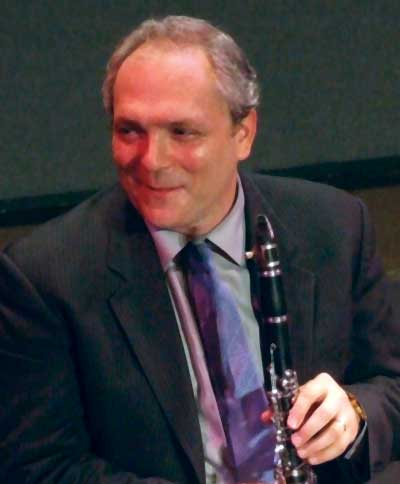
- Peplowski in 2007

Background information
- Born: May 23, 1959; Cleveland, Ohio, U.S.
- Died: February 2, 2026 (aged 66) Aboard the Celebrity Summit sailing in the Gulf of Mexico
- Genres: Jazz, dixieland, swing, mainstream jazz, traditional pop
- Occupation: Musician
- Instruments: Clarinet, tenor saxophone
- Labels: Concord, Nagel-Heyer, Arbors
- Website: kenpeplowski.com

Kenneth Joseph Peplowski (May 23, 1959 – February 2, 2026) was an American jazz clarinetist and tenor saxophonist. He was known primarily for playing swing music. For over a decade, Peplowski recorded for Concord Records.

== Life and career ==
Peplowski was born in Cleveland, Ohio, on May 23, 1959. In 2007, Peplowski was named jazz advisor of Oregon Festival of American Music and music director of Jazz Party at The Shedd, both in Eugene, Oregon.

Peplowski battled multiple myeloma for five years. He died unexpectedly on February 2, 2026, at the age of 66. He had been participating on a Jazz Cruise aboard the Celebrity Summit when he failed to appear for a scheduled afternoon performance, although he had a reputation of being consistently punctual. Peplowski was subsequently found dead in his cabin.

== Awards and honors ==
- Best Jazz Record of the Year, Preis der deutschen Schallplattenkritik, The Natural Touch (1992)
- The Satchmo Award presented by the Jazz Club of Sarasota in March 2014

== Discography ==
=== As leader/co-leader ===
- Double Exposure (Concord Jazz CCD-4344, 1988) – recorded 1987
- Sonny Side (Concord Jazz CCD-4376, 1989)
- Mr. Gentle and Mr. Cool (Concord Jazz CCD-4419, 1990)
- Illuminations (Concord Jazz CCD-4449, 1991)
- The Natural Touch (Concord Jazz CCD-4517, 1992)
- Ken Peplowski & Howard Alden with Howard Alden (Concord Jazz CCD-4556, 1993) – recorded 1992
- Steppin' with Peps (Concord Jazz CCD-4569, 1993)
- Live at Ambassador Auditorium with Harry "Sweets" Edison (Concord Jazz CCD-4610, 1994)
- Encore! (Live at Centre Concord) with Howard Alden (Concord Jazz CCD-4654, 1995)
- It's a Lonesome Old Town (Concord Jazz CCD-4673, 1995)
- The Other Portrait (Concord Concerto CCD-42043, 1996)
- A Good Reed (Concord Jazz CCD-4767, 1997)
- Grenadilla (Concord Jazz CCD-4809, 1998)
- Last Swing of the Century (Concord Jazz CCD-4864, 1999)
- All This... Ken Peplowski Live in the U.K. Volume 1 (Koch Jazz KOC-8581, 2000)
- The Jazz KENNection with Kenny Davern (Arbors ARCD-19246, 2001)
- Ellingtonian Tales (Mainstem MCD-0021, 2001)
- Lost in the Stars (Nagel Heyer 2020, 2001)
- Just Friends with George Masso (Nagel Heyer 5001, 2002)
- Easy to Remember (Nagel Heyer 2043, 2004)
- Memories of You (Venus TKCV-35372, 2006) – recorded 2005
- When You Wish Upon a Star (Venus TKCV-35414, 2007) – recorded 2006
- Dialogues with Kenny Davern (Arbors ARCD-19317, 2007)
- Dearest Duke with Carol Sloane and Brad Hatfield (Arbors, 2007)
- Ken Peplowski Gypsy Jazz Band, Gypsy Lamento (Venus VHCD-1004, 2008) – recorded 2007
- Pow-Wow with Howard Alden (Arbors ARCD-19340, 2008)
- Happy Together: Live at Birdland, Volume One with Jesper Thilo (Nagel Heyer CD-097, 2008) – recorded 2002
- Stardust with the New York Trio (Venus VHCD-1026, 2009) – recorded 2008
- Doodle Oodle with Alan Barnes (Woodville WVCD-127, 2009)
- Noir Blue (Capri 74098, 2010)
- Happy Reunion with Alan Barnes (Woodville WVCD-131, 2010)
- In Search Of... (Capri 74108, 2011)
- Maybe September (Capri 74125, 2013)
- The Clarinet Maestros with Julian Marc Stringle, Craig Milverton (Merfangle MM-415, 2015)
- At the Watermill with Alan Barnes (Woodville WVCD-143, 2015)
- Enrapture (Capri 74141, 2016)
- Ken Peplowski Big Band, Sunrise (Arbors ARCD-19458, 2018) – recorded 2017
- Duologue with Adrian Cunningham (Arbors ARCD-19460, 2018) – recorded 2017
- Petite Fleur (Venus VHCD-1259, 2019) – recorded 2018
- Amizade with Diego Figueiredo (Arbors ARCD-19468, 2019)
- Counterpoint: Lerner & Loewe (Arbors ARCD-19471, 2019)
- Live at Mezzrow (Cellar Music Group CMSLF-007, 2024) – recorded 2023
- Unheard Bird (Arbors ARCD-19489, 2024)

=== As sideman ===
With Charlie Byrd

- The Bossa Nova Years (Concord, 1991)
- Aquarelle (Concord Concerto, 1994)
- Moments Like This (Concord, 1994)
- Homage to Jobim (Concord Picante, 2005)

With Eddie Higgins

- It's Magic (Venus, 2006)
- It's Magic, Vol. 2 (Venus, 2007)
- A Handful of Stars (Venus, 2009)

With Dick Hyman

- Swing Is Here (Reference, 1996)
- E Pluribus Duo (Victoria Company, 2009)
- Live at the Kitano (Victoria Company, 2013)

With Susannah McCorkle

- No More Blues (Concord Jazz, 1989)
- From Bessie to Brazil (Concord Jazz, 1993)
- From Broadway to Bebop (Concord Jazz, 1994)
- Easy to Love: The Songs of Cole Porter (Concord Jazz, 1996)

With Michael Moore

- The History of Jazz, Volume 1 (Arbors, 2000)
- The History of Jazz, Volume 2 (Arbors, 2000)

With Nicki Parrott

- Like a Lover (Venus, 2011)
- The Look of Love (Venus, 2014)
- Yesterday Once More: The Carpenters Song Book (Venus, 2016)

With John Pizzarelli

- Let There Be Love (Telarc, 2000)
- Italian Intermezzo (Menus and Music, 2000)

With Leon Redbone

- Red to Blue (August 1985; Blue Thumb, 2001)
- Sugar (Private Music, 1990)
- Up a Lazy River (Private Music, 1992)
- Whistling in the Wind (Private Music, 1994)
- Any Time (Blue Thumb, 2001)

With Randy Sandke

- Stampede (Jazzology, 1992)
- I Hear Music (Concord Jazz, 1993)
- The Bix Beiderbecke Era (Nagel-Heyer, 1993)
- The Re-discovered Louis and Bix (Nagel-Heyer, 2000)
- Inside Out (Nagel-Heyer, 2002)
- Randy Sandke Meets Bix Beiderbecke (Nagel-Heyer, 2002)
- The Music of Bob Haggart (Arbors, 2002)

With Loren Schoenberg

- Time Waits for No One (Musicmasters, 1987)
- Solid Ground (Musicmasters, 1988)
- Just A-Settin' and A-Rockin' (Musicmasters, 1990)

With Mel Torme

- Mel Tormé and the Marty Paich Dektette – Reunion (Concord, 1988)
- Mel Tormé and the Marty Paich Dektette – In Concert Tokyo (Concord, 1988)
- Sing Sing Sing (Concord, 1992)
- A Tribute to Bing Crosby (Concord, 1994)

With Carol Welsman

- I Like Men (Welcar, 2009)
- Memories of You (Fab, 2009)

With others

- Howard Alden, The Howard Alden Trio Plus Special Guests: Ken Peplowski & Warren Vache (Concord Jazz, 1989)
- Steve Allen, Steve Allen Plays Jazz Tonight (Concord Jazz, 1993)
- Lucie Arnaz, Just in Time (Concord Jazz, 1993)
- Eden Atwood, Cat on a Hot Tin Roof (Concord Jazz, 1994)
- Dan Barrett, Strictly Instrumental (Concord Jazz, 1987)
- Cheryl Bentyne, The Gershwin Songbook (ArtistShare, 2010)
- Ruby Braff, Cornet Chop Suey (Concord Jazz, 1994)
- Jim Cullum Jr., Fireworks! Red Hot & Blues (Riverwalk: Live from the Landing, 1996)
- Peter Ecklund, Peter Ecklund and the Melody Makers (Stomp Off, 1988)
- Lars Erstrand, Beautiful Friendship (Sittel, 1992)
- Marianne Faithfull, Easy Come Easy Go (Naive, 2008)
- Marty Grosz, Acoustic Heat (Sackville, 2006)
- Scott Hamilton, Groovin' High (Concord Jazz, 1992)
- Hank Jones, Lazy Afternoon (Concord Jazz, 1989)
- Rebecca Kilgore, Rebecca Kilgore with the Keith Ingham Sextet (Jump, 2001)
- Erich Kunzel, Route 66: That Nelson Riddle Sound (Telarc, 2000)
- Barbara Lea, At the Atlanta Jazz Party (Jazzology, 1993)
- Peggy Lee, Love Held Lightly (Angel, 1993)
- Jay Leonhart, Sensitive to the Touch: The Music of Harold Arlen (Groove Jams, 1998)
- George Masso, Trombone Artistry (Nagel-Heyer, 1995)
- Tommy Newsom, The Feeling of Jazz (Arbors, 1999)
- Spike Robinson & George Masso, Play Arlen (Hep, 1992)
- Marilyn Scott, Every Time We Say Goodbye (Venus, 2008)
- George Shearing, George Shearing in Dixieland (Concord Jazz, 1989)
- Andy Stein, Goin' Places (Stomp Off, 1987)
- Frank Vignola, Let It Happen (Concord Jazz, 1994)
- Terry Waldo, Footlight Varieties (Stomp Off, 1990)
- Paula West, Come What May (Hi Horse, 2001)
- V.A., Sweet and Lowdown (original soundtrack) (Sony Classical, 1999)

== Publications ==
- Frank Barrett and Ken Peplowski (Sep. - Oct., 1998) "Minimal Structures within a Song: An Analysis of 'All of Me'", Organization Science Vol. 9, No. 5
