= Birdland (Birdland album) =

Studio album by Birdland
- Released: Feb 1991
- Genre: Indie rock
- Label: Lazy Records
- Producer: Philip Tennant

Birdland chronology
Semi Official Live Album (1989)	Birdland (1991)

Singles from Birdland
- 1. "Sleep With Me" Released: February 1990; 2. "Rock N Roll Nigger" Released: October 1990; 3. "Everybody Needs Somebody" Released: February 1991; 4. "Wake Up Dreaming" Released: June 1991; 5. "Beat Me Like A Star" Released: October 1991; 6. "She Belongs To Me" Released: February 1992

Birdland is the debut album by English Indie rock band Birdland, released on Lazy Records in 1991.

== Track listing ==
All tracks are written by Vincent, Vincent.

No.	Title	Length
1.	"Shoot You Down"	3:11
2.	"Sleep With Me"	3:50
3.	"Don't Look Back"	4:20
4.	"Wake Up Dreaming"	2:25
5.	"Rock N Roll Nigger" (Kaye, Smith)	6:23
6.	"Everybody Needs Somebody"	3:39
7.	"Letter You Know"	4:08
8.	"Beat Me Like A Star"	4:07
9.	"She Belongs To Me"	3:31
10.	"Exit"	5:43
