= As Long as I Live (Harold Arlen and Ted Koehler song) =

1934 song by Harold Arlen and Ted Koehler

"As Long as I Live" is a song composed by Harold Arlen, with lyrics by Ted Koehler, it was written for their last show at the Cotton Club Parade, in 1934. It was introduced by Avon Long and Lena Horne.

== Notable recordings ==
- Lew Stone and His Band (vocal: Al Bowlly) (1934)
- Red McKenzie and Spirit of Rhythm - recorded September 11, 1934, for Decca Records (catalog 302B).
- Benny Goodman and His Orchestra, recorded May 14, 1934, for Columbia Records (catalog No.2923D).
- Benny Goodman and His Sextet, recorded November 7, 1940, with Count Basie on piano and Charlie Christian on guitar. This charted briefly in 1941.
- Lena Horne - recorded for RCA Victor (catalog No. 20-1626) (1944).
- Bing Crosby recorded the song in 1955 for use on his radio show and it was subsequently included in the box set The Bing Crosby CBS Radio Recordings (1954-56) issued by Mosaic Records (catalog MD7-245) in 2009.
- Anita O'Day in 1956 on her album This Is Anita
