= Brad Hatfield =

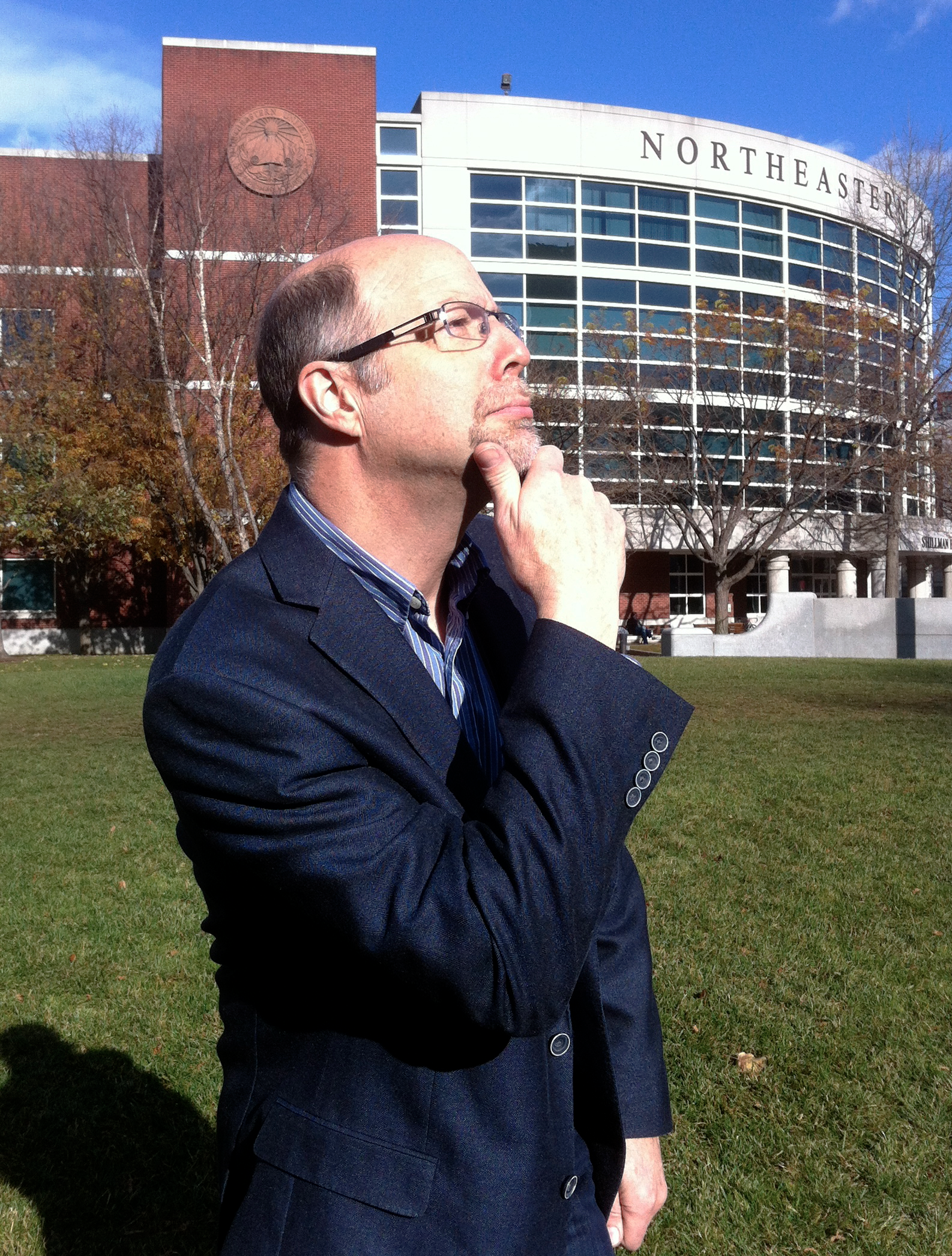

Background information
- Born: May 15, 1956 (age 70); Columbus, Ohio, U.S.
- Genres: Jazz • Film music • Pops
- Occupation: Composer • Musician
- Instrument: Piano
- Years active: 1974–present
- Website: bradhatfieldmusic.com

Brad Hatfield (born May 15, 1956) is a musician, arranger, and Emmy Award winning composer. He is a regular performer on piano and keyboards with the Boston Pops Orchestra. He has also performed with the Utah Symphony and the Boston Symphony Orchestra. His arrangements, orchestrations and compositions have been performed by the Boston Pops, Houston Symphony, Atlanta Symphony Orchestra, and Rochester Philharmonic Orchestra.

== Career ==
Hatfield's songs have appeared in the films Iron Man 2, Borat, Analyze This, The Break-Up, and Cop Land. His music has also appeared in more than two dozen television series, including The Sopranos, ER, CSI, Saturday Night Live, Glee, and Entourage.

He has performed on dozens of recordings, including albums by the Boston Pops Orchestra, George Russell Living Time Orchestra, and Mike Metheny. His solo piano playing is featured in the opening scene and end credits of Clint Eastwood's Mystic River.

In 2004–2005 and 2007, Hatfield was pianist/arranger and music director for POPSearch, the Boston Pops's nationwide talent competition.

Hatfield studied piano performance and composition at Berklee College of Music, and management at Cambridge College.

He teaches at Northeastern University and Berklee College of Music. He is also a course author and instructor for Berklee Online. In 2012, Hatfield was awarded "Best Online Course" by the University Professional & Continuing Education Association for his Berklee Online course "Music Supervision."

== Awards ==
- Emmy Award for Outstanding Original Song Daytime Television (2006)
- BMI Film and Television Award (2007)
- Primetime Emmy Award Nomination (2010)

== Selected discography ==
=== With the Boston Pops Orchestra ===
- 1998 – The Celtic Album (BMG Music)
- 1999 – A Splash of Pops (BMG Music)
- 2000 – Encore (BMG Music)
- 2003 – "Mystic River" Soundtrack (Warner Bros. Records)
- 2004 – Sleigh Ride (Boston Pops Recordings)
- 2005 – America (Boston Pops Recordings)
- 2009 – Red Sox Album (Boston Pops Recordings)

=== With George Russell Living Time Orchestra ===
- 1993 – The London Concert (Stash Records)
- 1996 – It's About Time (Label Bleu)
- 2005 – The 80th Birthday Concert (Independent)

=== With Rebecca Parris ===
- 2002 – Secret of Christmas (Shira)
- 2006 – You Don't Know Me (Saying it with Jazz)

=== With Mike Metheny ===
- 1996 – Street of Dreams (Altenburgh)
- 1988 – Kaleidoscope (MCA/Impulse)

=== With Susan Werner ===
- 2004 – I Can't Be New (Koch Records)
- 2009 – Classics (Sleeve Dog Records)

=== With Mordy Ferber ===
- 1987 – All the Way to Sendai (Rhino Records)
- 1995 – Mr X (Half Note Records)
- 2004 – Being There (Half Note Records)

=== With Meg Hutchinson ===
- 2004 – The Crossing (Little Red Hen)
- 2008 – Come Up Full (Red House Records)
- 2010 – The Living Side (Red House Records)

=== With Carol Sloane and Ken Peplowski ===
- 2007 – Dearest Duke (Arbors Records)
