= Will Friedwald =

American author and music critic (born 1961)

- Born: 1961 (age 64–65); United States
- Occupations: Writer, journalist, music critic

Will Friedwald (born September 16, 1961) is an American author and music critic. He has written for newspapers that include the Wall Street Journal, New York Times, Village Voice, Newsday, New York Observer, and New York Sun – and for magazines that include Entertainment Weekly, Oxford American, New York, Mojo, BBC Music Magazine, Stereo Review, Fi, (Note: Fi ("The Magazine of Music and Sound") was published monthly (10 issues a year) from January/February 1996 (Vol. 1, No. 1) to March 1999 (Vol. 4, No. 3) by Larry Alan Kay (born 1947) under the auspices of Fi, L.L.C., formed in Delaware, and based in San Francisco. Kay, who had been Chairman of IHOP, served as President and CEO of Fi, L.L.C., from October 1995 to May 1998. The articles were mostly reviews of audiophile hi-fi technology and reviews of recorded music (source: The Internet Is Not the Answer, by Andrew Keen, Atlantic Monthly Press, 2015, p. 103 OCLC 938235377)) and American Heritage.

== Selected works ==
=== Books ===
==== As main author ====
1. Sinatra! The Song Is You – A Singer's Art (1995). Charles Scribner's Sons – via Google Books. OCLC 32552191 (all editions).
  (this book won the 1996 ASCAP Deems Taylor Award for Excellence in Music Criticism)
2. Jazz Singing – America's Great Voices From Bessie Smith to Bebop and Beyond (1990). Charles Scribner's Sons. 1990. ISBN 978-0-684-18522-4 – via Internet Archive. LCCN 91-32186; OCLC 440808063 (all editions). (Note: Jazz Singing: "Book Review: Jazz Performers: An Annotated Bibliography of Biographical Materials," by Michael B. Cogswell (born 1953), Notes, Vol. 47, No. 4, June 1991, pp. 1161–1163 OCLC 6733302709; ISSN 0027-4380 OCLC 5548166813; ISSN 0027-4380 JSTOR 941652 Note: Michael Bruce Cogswell (born 1953) – a jazz scholar and preservationist – is Executive Director of the Louis Armstrong House Museum, where he has worked since 1991)
3. Stardust Melodies – The Biography of Twelve of America's Most Popular Songs. (Note: Stardust Melodies: "Will Friedwald: Ten Years After – Lee Mergner interviews author of new book on the great jazz and pop vocalists," by Lee Mergner, JazzTimes, December 10, 2010 (retrieved May 25, 2017))
  (1st ed.) (2002). Pantheon Books. ISBN 978-0-375-42089-4 – via Internet Archive. OCLC 891714972 (all editions).
  eBook (2013); OCLC 869466664 (all editions).
4. A Biographical Guide to the Great Jazz and Pop Singers, Pantheon Books (2010); OCLC 790931612 (all editions).
5. The Great Jazz and Pop Vocal Albums (1st ed.), Pantheon (Knopf Doubleday Publishing Group) (2017); OCLC 951833385 (all editions).

==== As co- and contributing-author ====
6. Looney Tunes and Merrie Melodies: An Illustrated Guide to the Warner Bros. Cartoons (1st ed.), by Jerry Beck & Will Friedwald, Henry Holt and Company (1989); OCLC 856734486, 19671400
7. Warner Bros. Animation Art – The Characters, the Creators, the Limited Editions, by Jerry Beck & Will Friedwald, Hugh Lauter Levin Associates (1997 & 2002); OCLC 437567875, 51634513
8. The Good Life: The Autobiography of Tony Bennett, by Tony Bennett ("with Will Friedwald")
  Hardcover – Simon & Schuster (1998); OCLC 877197581
  Paperback – Pocket Books (1999); OCLC 41072316
9. The Future of Jazz (1st ed.), Chicago: A Cappella Books (an imprint of Chicago Review Press (2002); OCLC 260106148, LCCN 2002-1315
  Co-authors: Will Friedwald, Ted Gioia, Jim Macnie (né James Richard Macnie; born approx. 1954), Peter Margasak (born 1966) (music writer with the Chicago Reader), Stuart Nicholson (de) (born 1948), Ben Ratliff, John F. Szwed, Greg Tate, Peter Watrous (né Peter Lagrange Watrous; born 1958) (jazz critic, formerly, from 1988 to 1999, of the New York Times), K. Leander Williams (né Kelvin Leander Williams; born 1963) (freelance journalist)
  Editor: Yuval J. Taylor (born 1963) (Taylor is the Senior Editor at the Chicago Review Press, where he has been since 1998)
10. Playboy Swings: How Hugh Hefner and Playboy Changed the Face of Music, by Patty Farmer, contributions by Will Friedwald, New York: Beaufort Books Inc. (connected to Midpoint Trade Books) (2015); OCLC 907206415

=== Essays, articles ===
==== Journalism: print/online newspapers, magazines, and broadcasts ====
11. "Fi Jazz – Jazz Reviews," Friedwald (one of 10 critics) review the CDs of 1997, Fi ("The Magazine of Music and Sound"), Vol. 3, No. 3, March 1998, p. 139; ISSN 1086-2153, LCCN 10--129
12. "Louis Prima: He's So Delightfully Low," Oxford American, Issue 16 (launch of special annual issue: Southern Music, Vol. 1), Spring 1997, pp. 55–59; ISSN 1074-4525
13. "Music: Ghost Bands Very Much Alive,", New York Times, August 6, 1997
14. "This Modern-Day Musician Keeps the Jazz Age Alive – Profile: Peter Mintun" (Peter Mintun), New York Sun, January 25, 2005
15. "Elvis Today The King Lives On – But He's Not Who You Always Thought He Was," American Heritage, Vol. 56, No. 1 (2005), pp. 22–29; OCLC 205088041, ISSN 0002-8738 (publication)
16. "A Soaring Swan Song" (subscription or fee required), Wall Street Journal, February 16, 2015
  (CD review: Judy Garland – Swan Songs, First Flights, Hallow Records DHR-00101-3, 2015; OCLC 899232233)
  "'Judy Garland: Swan Songs, First Flights' proves that at the end of her career, the singer still could reach down to the bottom of her soul and come up with something to dazzle and amaze" – Will Friedwald
17. "Jazz Futurist, Mad Scientist" (profile of Scott Robinson) (subscription or fee required), Wall Street Journal, May 25, 2010
18. Fresh Air, NPR, produced by WHYY-FM, Philadelphia: Terry Gross, host
  1. Friedwald discusses his new encyclopedic book, Sinatra!, September 24, 1997; OCLC 9715030
    1. (aired again), December 29, 1997; OCLC 973825522
    2. (aired again) (ceremoniously re-aired on the eve of Sinatra's birth centennial), December 11, 2015
  2. "Fred Astaire Centennial Celebration" (Friedwald, the first of three guests, describes Fred Astaire's singing ability), May 10, 1999; OCLC 971502371
  3. Friedwald discusses Mildred Bailey (Friedwald wrote liner notes for a new release, 10 CDs, The complete Columbia recordings of Mildred Bailey, Mosaic Records, 2000; OCLC 900094714), February 12, 2001; OCLC 973825636
19. Weekend Edition, NPR, Scott Simon, host
  4. "Jazz Balladeer Influenced Better-Known Singers" (death of Jimmy Scott – reflections – by NPR's Mandalit del Barco and guest, Friedwald), June 14, 2014
20. All Things Considered, NPR
  5. "Mood Indigo" (NPR host Noah Adams introduced the topic – Ellington's "Mood Indigo" and NPR's reporter, Lou Santacroce – who, in turn, gave a radio essay with guests David Baker, Ervin Drake, and Friedwald)
  6. "Happy Birthday to Cab Calloway" (introduced by NPR host Andrea Seabrook, WNYC reporter Sara Fishko presents an interactive radio essay with guests C. Calloway Brooks, Cab's son, and Friedwald), December 22, 2007
  7. Book Review (NPR's Audie Cornish interviews Friedwald about his new book, Biographical Guide to the Great Jazz and Pop Singers), December 12, 2010

==== Liner notes ====
21. Frank Sinatra – The Complete Capitol Singles Collection, Capitol Records (4 CD's) (1996); OCLC 867879332, 36230372

== Family ==
=== Father: Herb Friedwald ===
Will Friedwald is the son of the late Herb Friedwald (né Herbert F. Friedwald; 1935–1997) who was a jazz producer, jazz historian, and record label lawyer in New York. Herb was the founder of the short-lived jazz label, Kharma Records. Among other pursuits, Herb wrote liner notes.

==== Selected liner notes of Herb Friedwald ====
1. Peter Bocage with His Creole Serenaders and the Love-Jiles Ragtime Orchestra, Riverside RLP 357 & RLP 379, recorded June 12, 1960, and January 26, 1961, New Orleans; OCLC 31315182, 54717443
2. The Orange Kellin Trio: Orange Kellin (né Örjan Kjellin; born 1944 Ljungby, Sweden) (clarinet), Jon Marks (piano), John Russell (drums), GBH BCD-384, recorded February 10, 1992, Litchfield, Connecticut

== Other external links ==
- Friedwald's YouTube channel
- Will Friedwald Interview NAMM Oral History Library (2021)
