= List of UK top-ten singles in 1952 =

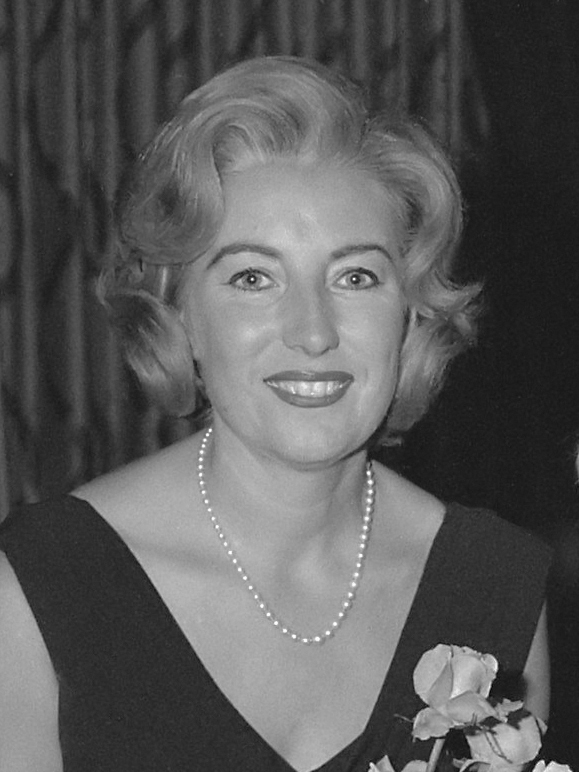
Vera Lynn achieved the best-selling single of 1952, "Auf Wiederseh'n Sweetheart", although it only peaked at number ten. She had a further two top 10 singles this year: "The Homing Waltz", which reached number nine, and "Forget Me Not", which peaked at number five.

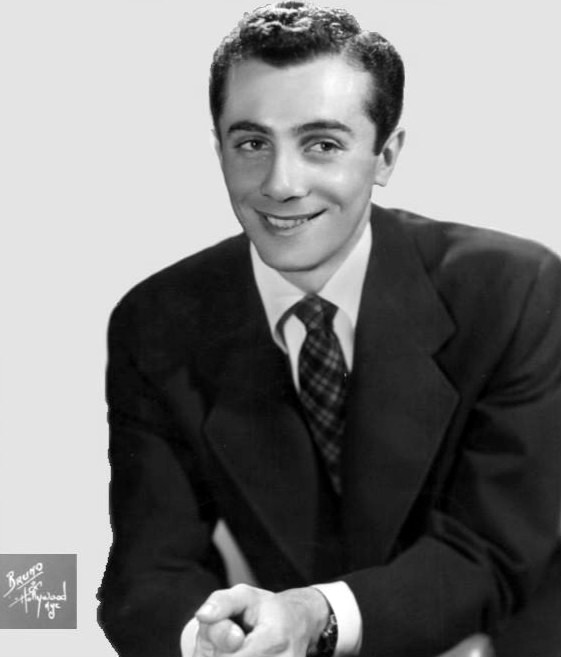
In November of this year, Al Martino secured the first ever number-one record in the UK Singles Chart with "Here in My Heart", which spent nine consecutive weeks at the top of the chart.

The UK Singles Chart is one of many music charts compiled by the Official Charts Company that calculates the best-selling singles of the week in the United Kingdom. Before 2004, the chart was only based on the sales of physical singles. New Musical Express (NME) magazine published the United Kingdom record charts for the first time in 1952. NME originally published only a top 12 (although the first chart had a couple of singles that were tied so a top 15 was announced) but this was gradually extended to encompass a top 20 by October 1954. This list shows singles that peaked in the Top 10 of the UK Singles Chart during 1952, as well as singles which peaked in 1953 but were in the top 10 in 1952. The entry date is when the single appeared in the top 10 for the first time (week ending, as published by the Official Charts Company, which is six days after the chart is announced).

Twenty-three singles were in the top ten in 1952. "Takes Two to Tango" by Louis Armstrong, "Comes A-Long A-Love" by Kay Starr, "Walkin' to Missouri" by Tony Brent and "You Belong to Me" by Jo Stafford were all released in 1952 but did not reach their peak until 1953. Eight artists scored multiple entries in the top 10 in 1952. Al Martino, Nat King Cole, Guy Mitchell and Frankie Laine were among the many artists who achieved their first UK charting top 10 single in 1952.

The first single to reach number-one in the United Kingdom was "Here in My Heart" by Al Martino; the song debuted at the top of the charts on 14 November 1952 and spent nine consecutive weeks in that position. It was the only single to top the chart that year.

== Background ==
=== Multiple entries ===
Twenty-three singles charted in the top 10 in 1952, with nineteen singles reaching their peak this year. "Because You're Mine" was recorded by Nat King Cole and Mario Lanza and both versions reached the top 10.

Eight artists scored multiple entries in the top 10 in 1952. American singer Bing Crosby and Britain's Vera Lynn shared the record for most top 10 hits in 1952 with three hit singles each, the first artists to ever do so. In addition, all of these entries were in the chart at the same time. "Forget Me Not" was the highest ranking that week at number 7 (it would eventually peak at number 5 the week prior to Christmas). "The Homing Waltz" reached number 9, one place higher than "Auf Wiederseh'n Sweetheart" at number 10.

Bing Crosby's three entries included a version of the Christmas classic "Silent Night", released as "Silent Night, Holy Night".

Al Martino was one of a number of artists with two top-ten entries, including the number-one single "Here in My Heart". Doris Day, Frankie Laine and Nat King Cole were the other artists who had multiple top 10 entries in 1952.

=== Chart debuts ===
Seventeen artists achieved their first top 10 single in 1952, either as a lead or featured artist. Of these, five went on to record another hit single that year: Al Martino, Doris Day, Frankie Laine, Her Majesty's Forces and Nat King Cole. Bing Crosby and Vera Lynn both had two other entries in their breakthrough year.

Artist	Number of top 10s	First entry	Chart position	Other entries
Al Martino	2	"Here in My Heart"	1	"Take My Heart" (9)
Jo Stafford	1	"You Belong to Me" ^{[A]}	1	—
Nat King Cole	2	"Somewhere Along the Way"	3	"Because You're Mine" (6)
Bing Crosby	3	"Isle of Innisfree"	3	"Zing a Little Zong" (10), "Silent Night, Holy Night" (8)
Guy Mitchell	1	"Feet Up (Pat Him on the Po-Po)"	2	—
Rosemary Clooney	1	"Half as Much"	3	—
Vera Lynn	3	"Forget Me Not"	5	"The Homing Waltz" (9), "Auf Wiederseh'n Sweetheart" (10)
Frankie Laine	2	"High Noon (Do Not Forsake Me)"	7	"Sugar Bush" (8)
Doris Day	2	"Sugar Bush"	8	"My Love and Devotion" (10)
Ray Martin and His Concert Orchestra	1	"Blue Tango"	8	—
Mario Lanza	1	"Because You're Mine"	3	—
Johnnie Ray	1	"Faith Can Move Mountains"	7	—
Kay Starr	1	"Comes A-Long A-Love" ^{[B]}	1	—
Jane Wyman	1	"Zing a Little Zong"	10	—
Mantovani	1	"White Christmas"	6	—
The Four Lads	1	"Faith Can Move Mountains"	7	—
Louis Armstrong	1	"Takes Two to Tango" ^{[C]}	6	—
Tony Brent	1	"Walkin' to Missouri" ^{[D]}	7	—

=== Songs from films ===
Original songs from various films entered the top 10 throughout the year. These included "Because You're Mine" (from Because You're Mine), "Isle of Innisfree" (The Quiet Man) and "Zing a Little Zong" (Just for You).

Additionally, "High Noon (Do Not Forsake Me)" was a version of the song from the film High Noon, originally recorded over the opening credits by Tex Ritter.

=== Best-selling singles ===
Until 1970 there was no universally recognised year-end best-sellers list. However, in 2011 the Official Charts Company released a list of the best-selling single of each year in chart history from 1952 to date. According to the list, "Auf Wiederseh'n Sweetheart" by Vera Lynn is officially recorded as the biggest-selling single of 1952.

== Top-ten singles ==
Key

Symbol	Meaning
♦	Single released in 1952 but peaked in 1953.
(#)	Year-end best-selling single.
Entered	The date that the single first appeared in the chart.
Peak	Highest position that the single reached in the UK Singles Chart.

Entered (week ending)	Weeks in top 10	Single	Artist	Peak	Peak reached (week ending)	Weeks at peak
14 November 1952	16	"Here in My Heart" ^{[E]}	Al Martino	1	14 November 1952	9
14 November 1952	16	"You Belong to Me" ♦ ^{[F]}	Jo Stafford	1	16 January 1953	1
14 November 1952	6	"Somewhere Along the Way" ^{[G]}	Nat King Cole	3	14 November 1952	1
14 November 1952	11	"Isle of Innisfree"	Bing Crosby	3	12 December 1952	3
14 November 1952	10	"Feet Up (Pat Him on the Po-Po)"	Guy Mitchell	2	21 November 1952	1
14 November 1952	9	"Half as Much"	Rosemary Clooney	3	21 November 1952	3
14 November 1952	6	"Forget Me Not" ^{[H]}	Vera Lynn	5	12 December 1952	1
14 November 1952	3	"High Noon (Do Not Forsake Me)" ^{[I]}	Frankie Laine	7	14 November 1952	2
14 November 1952	7	"Sugar Bush" ^{[J]}	Doris Day & Frankie Laine	8	14 November 1952	3
14 November 1952	2	"Blue Tango" ^{[K]}	Ray Martin	8	14 November 1952	1
14 November 1952	2	"The Homing Waltz" ^{[L]}	Vera Lynn	9	14 November 1952	2
14 November 1952	1	"Auf Wiederseh'n Sweetheart" (#1)	Vera Lynn	10	14 November 1952	1
21 November 1952	22	"Because You're Mine"	Mario Lanza	3	5 December 1952	3
21 November 1952	1	"Take My Heart"	Al Martino	9	21 November 1952	1
21 November 1952	2	"My Love and Devotion"	Doris Day	10	21 November 1952	2
5 December 1952	14	"Comes A-Long A-Love" ♦ ^{[M]}	Kay Starr	1	23 January 1953	1
5 December 1952	1	"Zing a Little Zong"	Bing Crosby & Jane Wyman	10	5 December 1952	1
19 December 1952	3	"White Christmas"	Mantovani	6	19 December 1952	2
19 December 1952	3	"Because You're Mine" ^{[N]}	Nat King Cole	6	19 December 1952	2
19 December 1952	3	"Faith Can Move Mountains" ^{[O]}	Johnnie Ray & The Four Lads	7	19 December 1952	2
19 December 1952	2	"Silent Night, Holy Night"	Bing Crosby	8	19 December 1952	2
19 December 1952	10	"Takes Two to Tango" ♦	Louis Armstrong	6	23 January 1953	1
19 December 1952	7	"Walkin' to Missouri" ♦ ^{[P]}	Tony Brent	7	9 January 1953	1

== Entries by artist ==
The following table shows artists who achieved two or more top 10 entries in 1952, including singles that reached their peak in 1953. The figures include both main artists and featured artists. The total number of weeks an artist spent in the top ten in 1952 is also shown.

Entries	Artist	Weeks	Singles
3	Vera Lynn	8	"Auf Wiederseh'n Sweetheart", "Forget Me Not", "The Homing Waltz"
3	Bing Crosby	8	"Isle of Innisfree", "Silent Night, Holy Night", "Zing a Little Zong"
2	Al Martino	7	"Here in My Heart", "Take My Heart"
2	Doris Day	6	"My Love and Devotion", "Sugar Bush"
2	Frankie Laine	7	"High Noon (Do Not Forsake Me)", "Sugar Bush"
2	Nat King Cole	6	"Because You're Mine", "Somewhere Along the Way"

== See also ==
- 1952 in British music
- List of number-one singles from the 1950s (UK)

== Notes ==
- ^{a} "You Belong to Me" reached its peak of number one on 22 January 1953 (week ending).
- ^{b} "Comes A-Long A-Love" reached its peak of number one on 29 January 1953 (week ending).
- ^{c} "Takes Two to Tango" reached its peak of number six on 29 January 1953 (week ending).
- ^{d} "Walkin' to Missouri" reached its peak of number seven on 15 January 1953 (week ending).
- ^{e} "Here in My Heart" was the first ever number-one single in the UK Singles Chart.
- ^{f} "You Belong to Me" re-entered the top 10 at number 8 on 12 March 1953 (week ending).
- ^{g} "Somewhere Along the Way" re-entered the top 10 at number 7 on 18 December 1952 (week ending) for 3 weeks.
- ^{h} "Forget Me Not" re-entered the top 10 at number 7 on 4 December 1952 (week ending) for 5 weeks.
- ^{i} "High Noon (Do Not Forsake Me)" re-entered the top 10 at number 9 on 18 December 1952 (week ending).
- ^{j} "Sugarbush" re-entered the top 10 at number 8 on 11 December 1952 (week ending) for 6 weeks.
- ^{k} "Blue Tango" re-entered the top 10 at number 10 on 18 December 1952 (week ending).
- ^{l} "The Homing Waltz" re-entered the top 10 at number 9 on 4 December 1952 (week ending).
- ^{m} "Comes A-Long A-Love" re-entered the top 10 at number 8 on 26 March 1953 (week ending).
- ^{n} "Because You're Mine" re-entered the top 10 at number 10 on 29 January 1953 (week ending).
- ^{o} "Faith Can Move Mountains" re-entered the top 10 at number 9 on 15 January 1953 (week ending).
- ^{p} "Walkin' to Missouri" re-entered the top 10 at number 7 on 15 January 1953 (week ending) for 2 weeks.
