= 25th Academy Awards =

- Date: March 19, 1953
- Site: RKO Pantages Theatre; Hollywood, California; NBC International Theatre; New York City, New York
- Hosted by: Bob Hope (Hollywood); Conrad Nagel (emcee); Fredric March (New York City)

Highlights
- Best Picture: The Greatest Show on Earth
- Most awards: The Bad and the Beautiful (5)
- Most nominations: High Noon, Moulin Rouge, and The Quiet Man (7)

TV in the United States
- Network: NBC

The 25th Academy Awards were held on March 19, 1953, at the RKO Pantages Theatre in Hollywood, and the NBC International Theatre in New York City, to honor the films of 1952. It was the first Oscars ceremony to be televised, the first ceremony to be held in Hollywood and New York simultaneously, and the only year in which the New York ceremonies were held in the NBC International Theatre on Columbus Circle, which was shortly thereafter demolished and replaced by the New York Coliseum.

This ceremony was the first to be broadcast on television; the Academy, long resistant of television, paid NBC $100,000 to televise the event.

== Winners and nominees ==
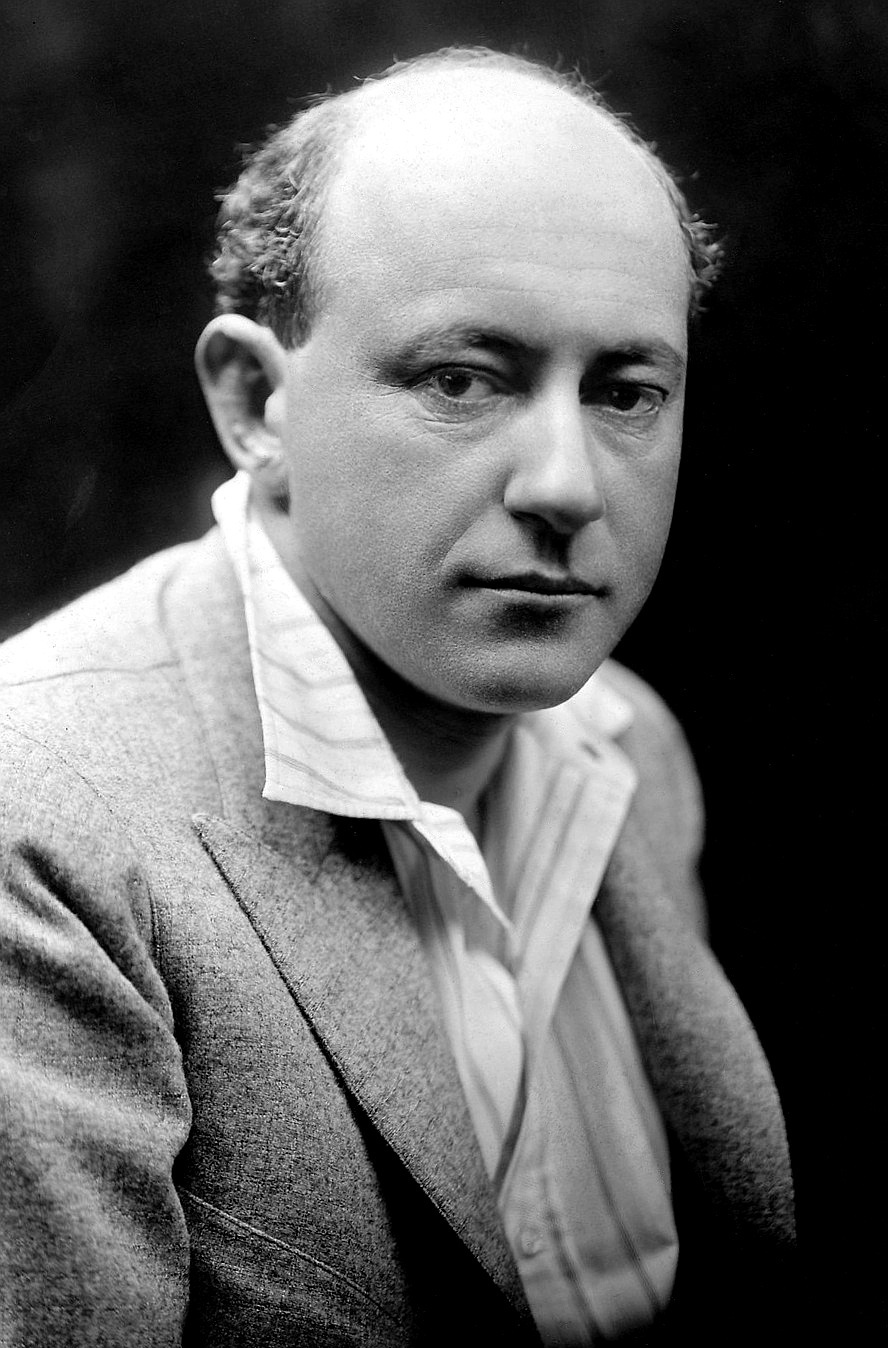
Cecil B. DeMille; Best Picture winner

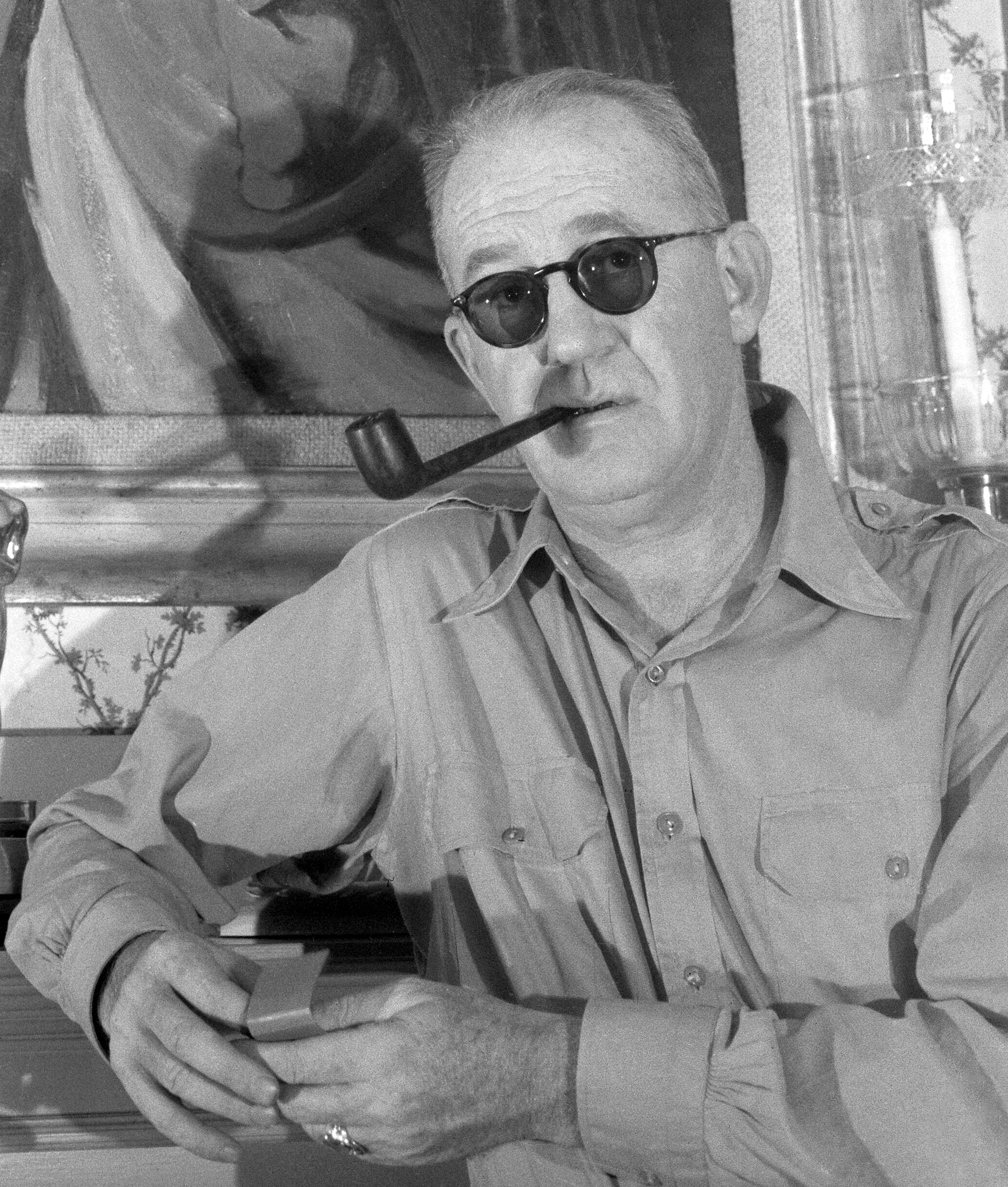
John Ford; Best Director winner

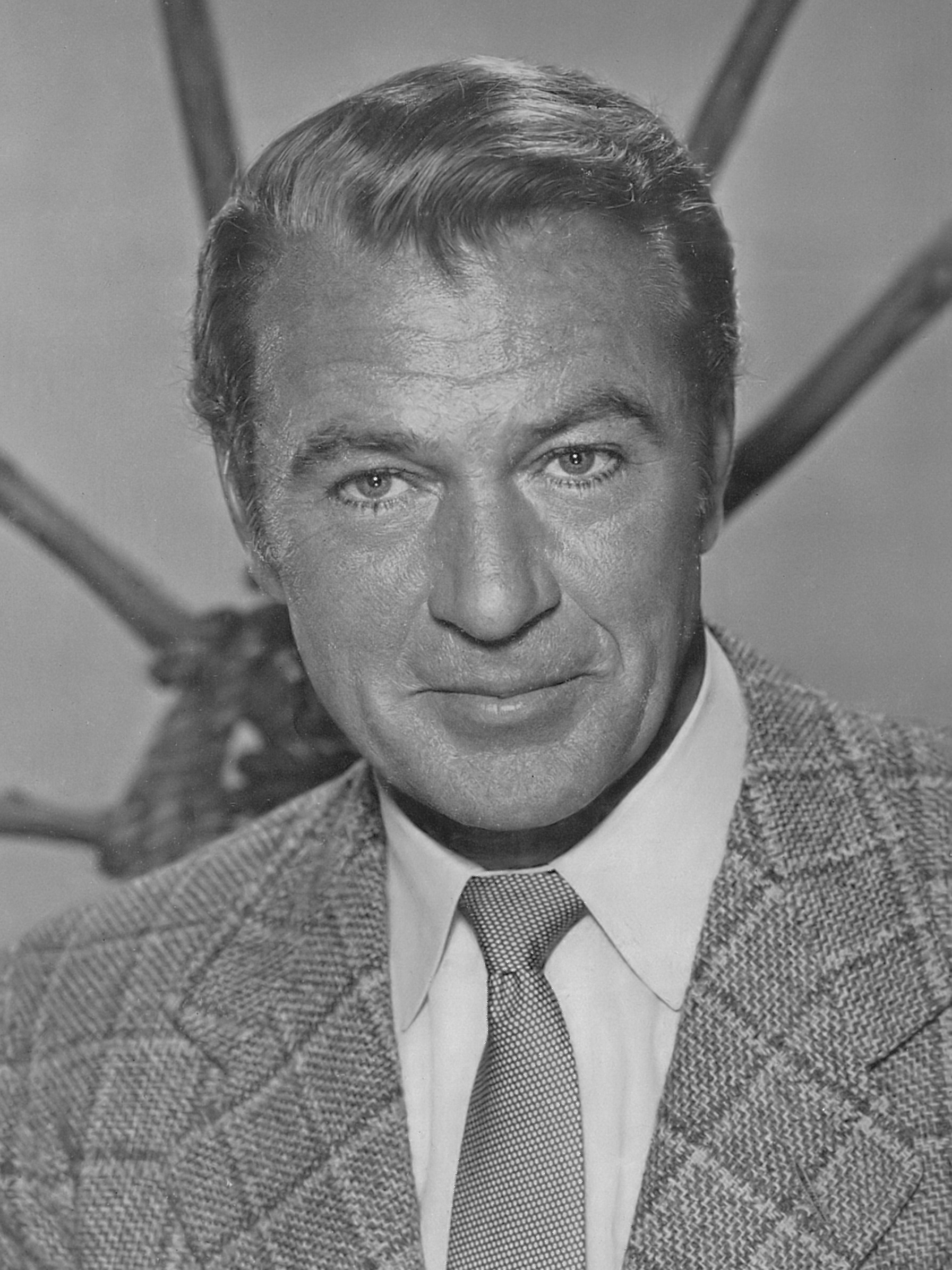
Gary Cooper; Best Actor winner

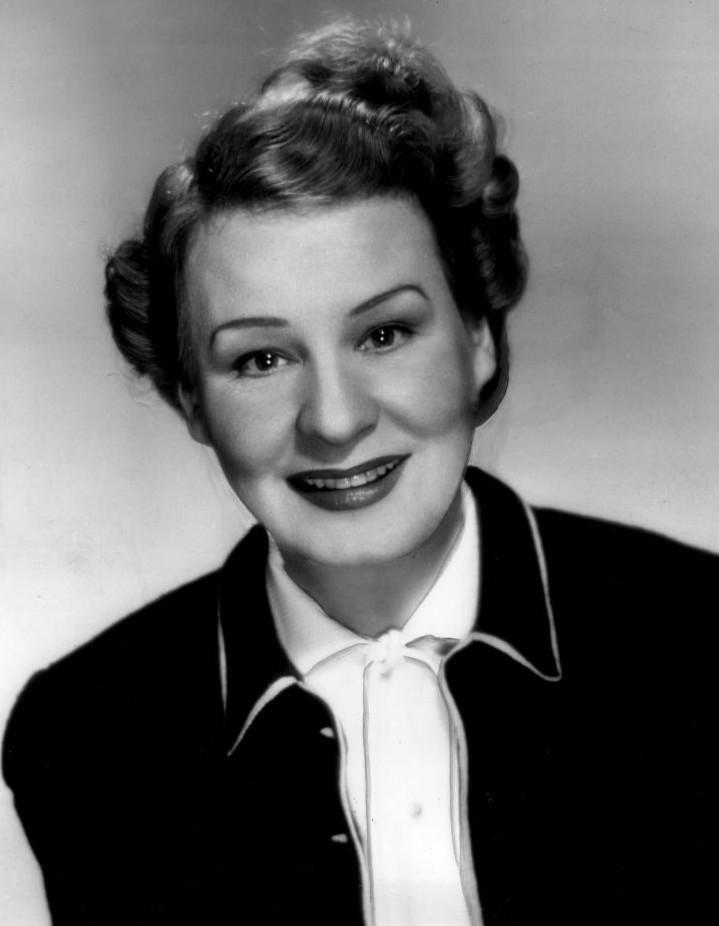
Shirley Booth; Best Actress winner

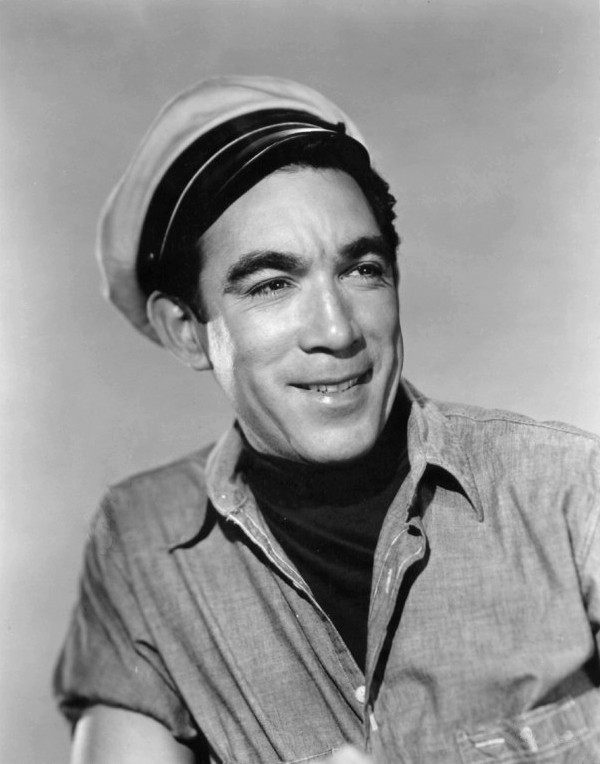
Anthony Quinn; Best Supporting Actor winner

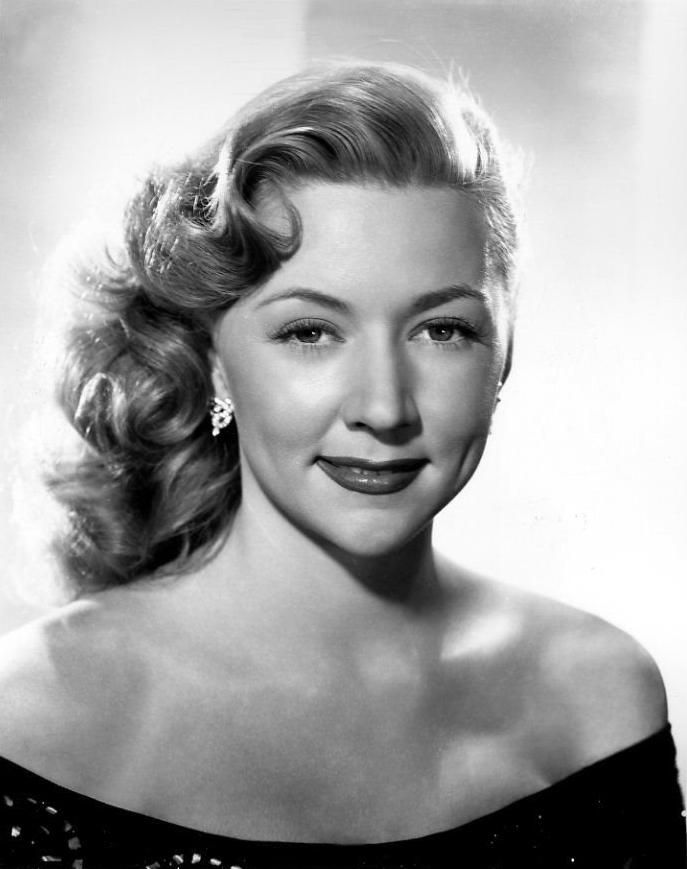
Gloria Grahame; Best Supporting Actress winner

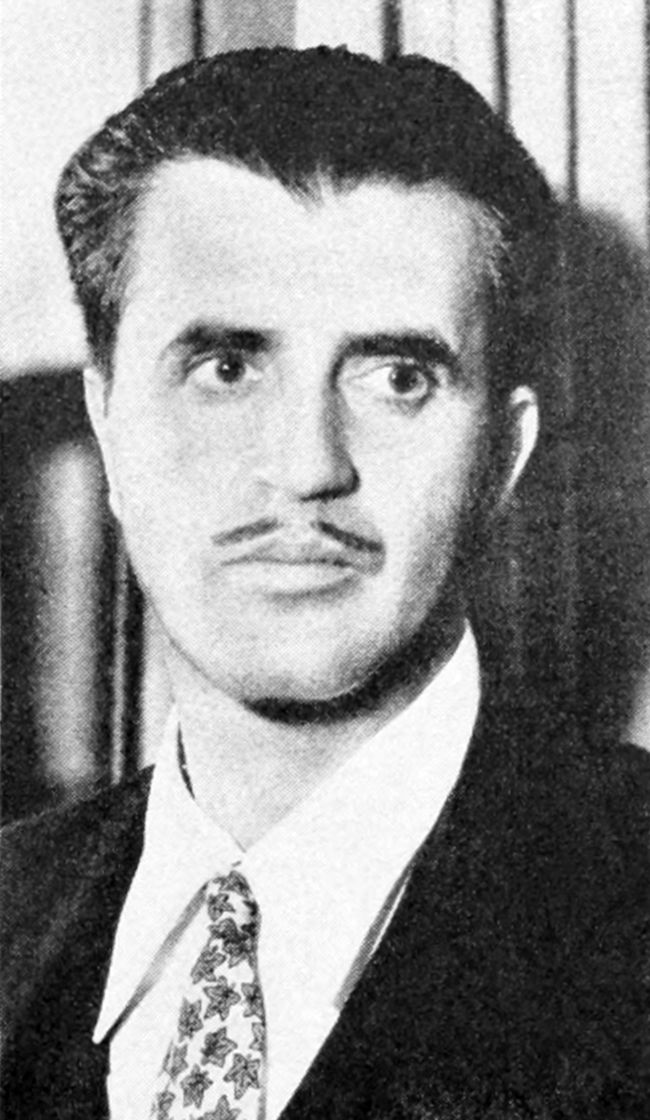
Cedric Gibbons; Best Art Direction, Black-and-White co-winner

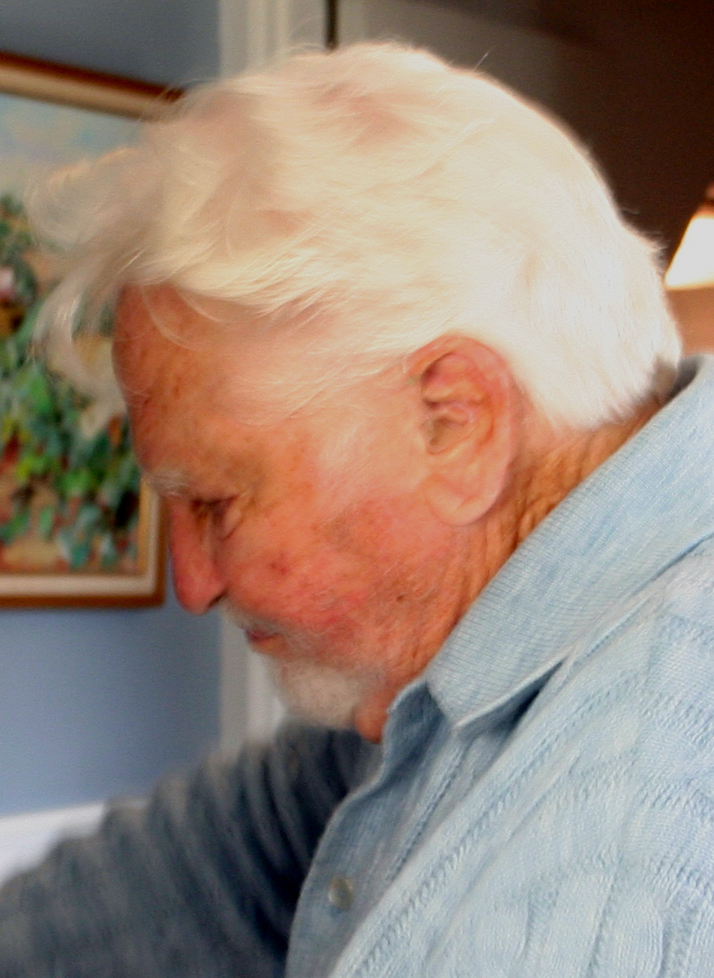
Elmo Williams; Best Film Editing co-winner

=== Awards ===
Nominees were announced on February 9, 1953. Winners are listed first and highlighted in boldface.

**Best Motion Picture**: **The Greatest Show on Earth – Cecil B. DeMille for Paramount Pictures**; High Noon – Stanley Kramer for United Artists; Ivanhoe – Pandro S. Berman for Metro-Goldwyn-Mayer; Moulin Rouge – John Huston for United Artists; The Quiet Man – John Ford and Merian C. Cooper for Republic Pictures	**Best Directing**: **John Ford – The Quiet Man**; Joseph L. Mankiewicz – Five Fingers; Cecil B. DeMille – The Greatest Show on Earth; Fred Zinnemann – High Noon; John Huston – Moulin Rouge
**Best Actor**: **Gary Cooper – High Noon as Marshall Will Kane**; Marlon Brando – Viva Zapata! as Emiliano Zapata; Kirk Douglas – The Bad and the Beautiful as Jonathan Shields; José Ferrer – Moulin Rouge as Henri de Toulouse-Lautrec/Comte Alphonse de Toulouse-Lautrec; Alec Guinness – The Lavender Hill Mob as Henry "Dutch" Holland	**Best Actress**: **Shirley Booth – Come Back, Little Sheba as Lola Delaney**; Joan Crawford – Sudden Fear as Myra Hudson; Bette Davis – The Star as Margaret "Maggie" Elliot; Julie Harris – The Member of the Wedding as Frankie Addams; Susan Hayward – With a Song in My Heart as Jane Froman
**Best Actor in a Supporting Role**: **Anthony Quinn – Viva Zapata! as Eufemio Zapata**; Richard Burton – My Cousin Rachel as Philip Ashley; Arthur Hunnicutt – The Big Sky as Zeb Calloway; Victor McLaglen – The Quiet Man as Squire "Red" Will Danaher; Jack Palance – Sudden Fear as Lester Blaine	**Best Actress in a Supporting Role**: **Gloria Grahame – The Bad and the Beautiful as Rosemary Bartlow**; Jean Hagen – Singin' in the Rain as Lina Lamont; Colette Marchand – Moulin Rouge as Marie Charlet; Terry Moore – Come Back, Little Sheba as Marie Buckholder; Thelma Ritter – With a Song in My Heart as Clancy
**Best Writing (Motion Picture Story)**: **The Greatest Show on Earth – Fredric M. Frank, Theodore St. John and Frank Cavett**; My Son John – Leo McCarey; The Narrow Margin – Martin Goldsmith and Jack Leonard; The Pride of St. Louis – Guy Trosper; The Sniper – Edna Anhalt and Edward Anhalt	**Best Writing (Story and Screenplay)**: **The Lavender Hill Mob – T. E. B. Clarke**; The Atomic City – Sydney Boehm; Breaking the Sound Barrier – Terence Rattigan; Pat and Mike – Ruth Gordon and Garson Kanin; Viva Zapata! – John Steinbeck
**Best Writing (Screenplay)**: **The Bad and the Beautiful – Charles Schnee** from "Tribute to a Badman" by George Bradshaw; Five Fingers – Michael Wilson from Operation Cicero by Ludwig Carl Moyzisch; High Noon – Carl Foreman from "The Tin Star" by John W. Cunningham; The Man in the White Suit – Roger MacDougall, John Dighton and Alexander Mackendrick from The Man in the White Suit by Roger MacDougall; The Quiet Man – Frank S. Nugent from "Green Rushes" by Maurice Walsh	**Best Documentary (Feature)**: **The Sea Around Us – Irwin Allen**; The Hoaxters – Dore Schary; Navajo – Hall Bartlett
**Best Documentary (Short Subject)**: **Neighbours – Norman McLaren**; Devil Take Us – Herbert Morgan; The Garden Spider – Alberto Ancilotto; Man Alive! – Stephen Bosustow	**Best Short Subject (One-Reel)**: **Light in the Window – Boris Vermont**; Athletes of the Saddle – Jack Eaton; Desert Killer – Gordon Hollingshead; Neighbours – Norman McLaren; Royal Scotland – Crown Film Unit
**Best Short Subject (Two-Reel)**: **Water Birds – Walt Disney**; Bridge of Time – London Film Productions; Devil Take Us – Herbert Morgan; Thar She Blows! – Gordon Hollingshead	**Best Short Subject (Cartoon)**: **Johann Mouse – Fred Quimby**; Little Johnny Jet – Fred Quimby; Madeline – Stephen Bosustow; Pink and Blue Blues – Stephen Bosustow; The Romance of Transportation in Canada – Tom Daly
**Best Music (Music Score of a Dramatic or Comedy Picture)**: **High Noon – Dimitri Tiomkin**; Ivanhoe – Miklós Rózsa; The Miracle of Our Lady of Fatima – Max Steiner; The Thief – Herschel Burke Gilbert; Viva Zapata! – Alex North	**Best Music (Scoring of a Musical Picture)**: **With a Song in My Heart – Alfred Newman**; Hans Christian Andersen – Walter Scharf; The Jazz Singer – Ray Heindorf and Max Steiner; The Medium – Gian Carlo Menotti; Singin' in the Rain – Lennie Hayton
**Best Music (Song)**: **"The Ballad of High Noon ("Do Not Forsake Me, O My Darlin'")" from High Noon – Music by Dimitri Tiomkin; Lyrics by Ned Washington**; "Am I in Love?" from Son of Paleface – Music and Lyrics by Jack Brooks; "Because You're Mine" from Because You're Mine – Music by Nicholas Brodszky; Lyrics by Sammy Cahn; "Thumbelina" from Hans Christian Andersen – Music and Lyrics by Frank Loesser; "Zing a Little Zong" from Just for You – Music by Harry Warren; Lyrics by Leo Robin	**Best Sound Recording**: **Breaking the Sound Barrier – London Films Sound Department**; The Card – Pinewood Studios Sound Department; Hans Christian Andersen – Gordon E. Sawyer; The Quiet Man – Daniel J. Bloomberg; With a Song in My Heart – Thomas T. Moulton
**Best Art Direction (Black-and-White)**: **The Bad and the Beautiful – Art Direction: Cedric Gibbons and Edward Carfagno; Set Decoration: Edwin B. Willis and F. Keogh Gleason**; Carrie – Art Direction: Hal Pereira and Roland Anderson; Set Decoration: Emile Kuri; My Cousin Rachel – Art Direction: Lyle R. Wheeler and John DeCuir; Set Decoration: Walter M. Scott; Rashomon – Art Direction: So Matsuyama; Set Decoration: H. Matsumoto; Viva Zapata! – Art Direction: Lyle R. Wheeler and Leland Fuller; Set Decoration: Thomas Little and Claude Carpenter	**Best Art Direction (Color)**: **Moulin Rouge – Art Direction: Paul Sheriff; Set Decoration: Marcel Vertès**; Hans Christian Andersen – Art Direction: Richard Day and Antoni Clavé; Set Decoration: Howard Bristol; The Merry Widow – Art Direction: Cedric Gibbons and Paul Groesse; Set Decoration: Edwin B. Willis and Arthur Krams; The Quiet Man – Art Direction: Frank Hotaling; Set Decoration: John McCarthy Jr. and Charles Thompson; The Snows of Kilimanjaro – Art Direction: Lyle R. Wheeler and John DeCuir; Set Decoration: Thomas Little and Paul S. Fox
**Best Cinematography (Black-and-White)**: **The Bad and the Beautiful – Robert Surtees**; The Big Sky – Russell Harlan; My Cousin Rachel – Joseph LaShelle; Navajo – Virgil Miller; Sudden Fear – Charles Lang	**Best Cinematography (Color)**: **The Quiet Man – Winton C. Hoch and Archie Stout**; Hans Christian Andersen – Harry Stradling; Ivanhoe – F. A. Young; Million Dollar Mermaid – George Folsey; The Snows of Kilimanjaro – Leon Shamroy
**Best Costume Design (Black-and-White)**: **The Bad and the Beautiful – Helen Rose**; Affair in Trinidad – Jean Louis; Carrie – Edith Head; My Cousin Rachel – Charles LeMaire and Dorothy Jeakins; Sudden Fear – Sheila O'Brien	**Best Costume Design (Color)**: **Moulin Rouge – Marcel Vertès**; The Greatest Show on Earth – Edith Head, Dorothy Jeakins and Miles White; Hans Christian Andersen – Antoni Clavé, Mary Wills and Barbara Karinska; The Merry Widow – Helen Rose and Gile Steele (posthumous nomination); With a Song in My Heart – Charles LeMaire
**Best Film Editing**: **High Noon – Elmo Williams and Harry W. Gerstad**; Come Back, Little Sheba – Warren Low; Flat Top – William Austin; The Greatest Show on Earth – Anne Bauchens; Moulin Rouge – Ralph Kemplen

=== Best Special Effects ===
- Plymouth Adventure – Metro-Goldwyn-Mayer.

=== Honorary Foreign Language Film Award ===
- To Forbidden Games (France) - Best Foreign Language Film first released in the United States during 1952.

=== Honorary Awards ===
- To George Alfred Mitchell for the design and development of the camera which bears his name and for his continued and dominant presence in the field of cinematography.
- To Joseph M. Schenck for long and distinguished service to the motion picture industry.
- To Merian C. Cooper for his many innovations and contributions to the art of motion pictures.
- To Harold Lloyd, master comedian and good citizen.
- To Bob Hope for his contribution to the laughter of the world, his service to the motion picture industry, and his devotion to the American premise.

=== Irving G. Thalberg Memorial Award ===
- Cecil B. DeMille

== Multiple nominations and awards ==
Films that received multiple nominations
Nominations	Film
7	High Noon
7	Moulin Rouge
7	The Quiet Man
6	The Bad and the Beautiful
6	Hans Christian Andersen
5	The Greatest Show on Earth
5	Viva Zapata!
5	With a Song in My Heart
4	My Cousin Rachel
4	Sudden Fear
3	Come Back, Little Sheba
3	Ivanhoe
2	The Big Sky
2	Breaking the Sound Barrier
2	Carrie
2	Devil Take Us
2	Five Fingers
2	The Lavender Hill Mob
2	The Merry Widow
2	Navajo
2	Neighbours
2	Singin' in the Rain
2	The Snows of Kilimanjaro

Films that received multiple awards
Awards	Film
5	The Bad and the Beautiful
4	High Noon
2	The Greatest Show on Earth
2	Moulin Rouge
2	The Quiet Man

== Presenters and performers ==
=== Presenters ===
Name	Role
Ronald Reagan	Announcer for the 25th Academy Awards
Charles Brackett (AMPAS president)	Gave opening remarks welcoming guests to the awards ceremony
Ginger Rogers	Presenter of the award for Best Costume Design
Jean Hersholt	Presenter of the Documentary Awards
Frank Capra	Presenter of the award for Best Film Editing
Joan Fontaine; James Stewart	Presenters of the Art Direction Awards
Claire Trevor	Presenter of the award for Best Sound Recording
Ray Milland; Jane Wyman	Presenters of the Short Subject Awards
Teresa Wright	Presenter of the awards for Best Cinematography
Walt Disney	Presenter of the Music Awards
Charles Brackett; Olivia de Havilland	Presenters of the award for Best Director
Dore Schary	Presenter of the Writing Awards
Greer Garson	Presenter of the award for Best Supporting Actor
Edmund Gwenn	Presenter of the award for Best Supporting Actress
Janet Gaynor	Presenter of the award for Best Actor
Fredric March	Presenter of the award for Best Actress
Mary Pickford	Presenter of the award for Best Motion Picture
Loretta Young	Presenter of the award for Best Special Effects
Luise Rainer	Presenter of the Honorary Foreign Language Film Award
Charles Brackett	Presenter of the Honorary Awards to Joseph M. Schenck and Harold Lloyd
Anne Baxter	Presenter of the Scientific & Technical Awards
Charles Brackett	Presenter of the Honorary Award to Bob Hope and the Irving G. Thalberg Memorial Award to Cecil B. DeMille

=== Performers ===
Name	Role	Performed
Adolph Deutsch	Musical arranger and conductor	Orchestral
Bob Hope; Marilyn Maxwell	Performers	“Am I in Love?” from Son of Paleface
Billy Daniels	Performer	“Because You’re Mine” from Because You're Mine
Tex Ritter	Performer	“High Noon (Do Not Forsake Me, Oh My Darlin’)” from High Noon
Celeste Holm	Performer	“Thumbelina” from Hans Christian Andersen
Peggy Lee; Johnny Mercer	Performers	“Zing a Little Zong” from Just for You
Academy Awards Orchestra	Performers	"There's No Business Like Show Business" (orchestral) during the closing credits

== Ceremony information ==
=== Broadcast ===
The 25th Academy Awards ceremony was the first to be broadcast on television: For the first time in history, a television audience estimated at 40,000,000 persons will watch the movie industry's biggest show. It will mark the TV debut for scores of the biggest names in moviedom.

The telecast was prompted by the need to finance the bi-coastal ceremony. When three of the film studios refused to provide their customary financial support, the RCA Victor Division of the Radio Corporation of America agreed to pay AMPAS $100,000 (one source reported $250,000) as a sponsorship fee. NBC telecast the bicoastal ceremony over its 64-station television network and on its 174-station radio system. The Armed Forces Radio Service recorded the proceedings for later broadcast.

The show was broadcast from 10:30 p.m. to 12:15 a.m. EST (7:30 p.m. to 9:15 p.m. PST), switching back and forth from host Bob Hope on the West Coast to Conrad Nagel on the East Coast. The late start was made to accommodate those nominees who were performing that night on the Broadway stage.

The technology used for television at the time meant that Bob Hope had to wear a blue dress shirt with his formal dinner jacket; the traditional white shirt would have been too bright.

=== Notable achievements ===
The year saw a major upset when the heavily favored High Noon lost Best Picture to Cecil B. DeMille's The Greatest Show on Earth, eventually considered among the worst films to have won the award. Today, it ranks #94 on Rotten Tomatoes' list of the 95 films to win Best Picture, ahead of only The Broadway Melody.

Although it only received two nominations, Singin' in the Rain went on to be named as the greatest American musical film of all time and in the 2007 American Film Institute updated list as the fifth greatest American film of all time, while High Noon ranked twenty-seventh on the same list.

The Bad and the Beautiful won five Oscars, the most wins ever for a film not nominated for Best Picture. It was also the second—and, to date, last—Academy Awards in which a film not nominated for Best Picture received the most awards of the evening, excluding years where there were ties for the most wins.

Until Spotlight won only Best Picture and Best Original Screenplay at the 88th Academy Awards, this was the last year in which the Best Picture winner won just two total Oscars. It was also the second of three years to date in which two films not nominated for Best Picture received more nominations than the winner (The Bad and the Beautiful and Hans Christian Andersen, both with six). This occurred again at the 79th Academy Awards.

Shirley Booth was the last person born in the 19th century to win an Oscar in a Leading Role, and the first woman in her 50s to win Best Actress, at the age of 54 (the second woman in her 50s to win, Julianne Moore, was also 54 when she won at the 87th Academy Awards).

John Ford's fourth win for Best Director set a record for the most wins in this category that remains unmatched to this day. For the first time since the introduction of Supporting Actor and Actress awards in 1936, Best Picture, Best Director, and all four acting Oscars were awarded to six different films. This has happened only three times since, at the 29th Academy Awards for 1956, the 78th for 2005, and the 85th for 2012.

== See also ==
- 1952 in film
- 4th Primetime Emmy Awards
- 5th Primetime Emmy Awards
- 6th British Academy Film Awards
- 7th Tony Awards
- 10th Golden Globe Awards
