= 1952 in British music =

This is a summary of 1952 in music in the United Kingdom, including the official charts from that year.

This year was a turning point for music in not only the UK, but all over the world. The first official UK Singles Chart began in November 1952, compiled by the NME. This made the United Kingdom the first country in the world to have an official singles chart and created it in many other countries, with the Billboard Hot 100 era beginning in 1958 in the U.S. The singles chart quickly became a phenomenon and record breaking became a new excitement for the public. Compiled solely on sales, it kept this trend until April 2005, when it was combined with legal downloads.

== Summary ==
=== The Official UK Singles Chart ===
On the week ending 14 November 1952, NME published the first ever UK Singles Chart. Only a Top 12 at the time, it slowly grew over the years as nowadays sales data is gathered electronically and a Top 200 is compiled weekly for industrial purposes. During the rest of the decade and the early 1960s, there were many different charts formed and the general public were all confused as to which was the most accurate. The Official Charts Company uses NME until March 1960 and then uses Record Retailer until 1969, when an official sole chart was formed by an alliance between the two most popular charts.

To kick off the brand new chart, American jazz singer Al Martino had the first ever number one single in the UK with "Here in My Heart", which remains his biggest selling single. The song spent nine consecutive weeks at number one, which continued to be the longest consecutive run at number one until mid-1954. In second place was American pop singer Jo Stafford with "You Belong to Me", and, with the exception of one week, she stayed just one place behind the top spot for nine weeks, until she finally managed to knock Al Martino off the top in 1953. Another record-achiever went to English traditional popular music singer Vera Lynn, who had three singles within the top 10 at the same time with "Forget Me Not" (at number 7), "The Homing Waltz" (at number 9), and "Auf Wiederseh'n Sweetheart" (at number 10).

Other artists that had chart success in 1952 included Bing Crosby, Guy Mitchell, Mario Lanza, Rosemary Clooney, and Kay Starr, who had hits with "The Isle of Innisfree", "Feet Up", "Because You're Mine", "Half as Much", and "Comes A-Long A-Love".

== Number ones ==
=== Number-one singles ===
Issue date	Song	Artist
8 November	"Here in My Heart"	Al Martino
15 November	"Here in My Heart"	Al Martino
22 November	"Here in My Heart"	Al Martino
29 November	"Here in My Heart"	Al Martino
5 December	"Here in My Heart"	Al Martino
12 December	"Here in My Heart"	Al Martino
19 December	"Here in My Heart"	Al Martino
26 December	"Here in My Heart"	Al Martino

== Classical music ==
- Benjamin Britten – Canticle II: Abraham and Isaac.
- William Walton – Coronation Te Deum for the coronation of Queen Elizabeth II.

== Opera ==
- Michael Tippett – The Midsummer Marriage (not performed until 1955)

== Film and incidental music ==
- William Alwyn
  - The Card, starring Alec Guinness.
  - Mandy directed by Alexander Mackendrick, introducing Mandy Miller and starring Jack Hawkins.
- Malcolm Arnold
  - The Holly and the Ivy, starring Ralph Richardson, Celia Johnson, and Margaret Leighton.
  - The Sound Barrier directed by David Lean, starring Ralph Richardson.
- Francis Chagrin – The Happy Family, starring Stanley Holloway, Kathleen Harrison and Naunton Wayne.
- Brian Easdale – Outcast of the Islands directed by Carol Reed, starring Robert Morley, Trevor Howard, Ralph Richardson and Wendy Hiller.
- Benjamin Frankel – The Importance of Being Earnest directed by Anthony Asquith, starring Michael Redgrave.
- Philip Green – The Yellow Balloon
- Antony Hopkins – The Pickwick Papers, starring James Hayter.

== Births ==
- 15 January – Melvyn Gale, cellist (Electric Light Orchestra)
- 4 February – Jerry Shirley, drummer (Humble Pie and Fastway)
- 17 February – Michael Marra, singer-songwriter (died 2012)
- 21 February – Jean-Jacques Burnel, bassist The Stranglers
- 5 March – Alan Clark, keyboard player
- 19 March – Derek Longmuir, drummer (Bay City Rollers)
- 9 May – Linda Finnie, Scottish soprano
- 10 May – Lee Brilleaux, South African-English singer-songwriter (Dr Feelgood) (died 1994)
- 9 June – Robert Sandall, musician, music journalist and radio presenter (died 2010)
- 12 June – Oliver Knussen, Scottish composer (died 2018)
- 3 July – Andy Fraser, singer-songwriter and bass player (Free, Sharks, and John Mayall & the Bluesbreakers)
- 16 July – Gary Howard, musician (The Pathfinders)
- 19 July – Dominic Muldowney, composer
- 21 August – Joe Strummer, musician (The Clash) (died 2002)
- 30 August – Simon Bainbridge, composer (died 2021)
- 9 September – Dave Stewart, record producer (Eurythmics)
- 26 September – Cilla Fisher, Scottish folk singer-songwriter (The Singing Kettle)
- 2 December – James Lancelot, organist and conductor
- 27 December – David Knopfler, musician (Dire Straits)

== Deaths ==
- 5 February – Adela Verne, pianist and composer, 74
- 10 April – Frederic Austin, baritone singer and composer, 80
- 18 April – Leo Smith, cellist, composer and teacher who worked in Canada, 70
- 19 April – Steve Conway, singer (b. 1920)
- 25 July – Herbert Murrill, organist and composer, 53
- 22 August – Llewela Davies, Welsh pianist and composer, 81
- 6 September – Gertrude Lawrence, actress, singer, dancer (b. 1898)
- 16 September – Vesta Tilley, music hall entertainer (b. 1864)
- 21 October – Charles Draper, clarinetist, 82
- 17 November – Charles Penrose, music hall performer (b. 1873)
- date unknown
  - Charles Ancliffe, composer, 72
  - Mary Lucas, composer, 70

== See also ==
- 1952 in British television
- 1952 in the United Kingdom
- List of British films of 1952
