= Selections from the Paramount Picture "Just for You" =

Studio album by Bing Crosby, Jane Wyman, The Andrews Sisters
- Released: 1952
- Recorded: 1952
- Genre: Popular
- Label: Decca

Bing Crosby chronology
Themes and Songs from The Quiet Man (w/ Victor Young) (1952)	Selections from the Paramount Picture "Just for You" (1952)	Road to Bali (w/ Bob Hope and Peggy Lee) (1952)

Selections from the Paramount Picture "Just for You" is a Decca Records studio album by Bing Crosby, Jane Wyman and The Andrews Sisters of songs featured in the film Just for You released in 1952. All of the songs were written by Harry Warren (music) and Leo Robin (lyrics).

== Reception ==
Billboard reviewed the album saying, inter alia: “With the title flicker still to open and run what promises to be a long course, this album of ditties featured in the film figures to do right well over the counter. Crosby and Miss Wyman, of course, star in the pic. While the Andrews Sisters do not appear in the movie, their efforts on this disk add plus values… Liner carries a synopsis of the film and fairly detailed biographies of the artists featured on the disk.”

The Crosby and Jane Wyman duet Zing a Little Zong reached the No. 18 spot in the Best-sellers list and remained in the charts for six weeks. Leo Robin wrote an opening verse which was not used in the film or the commercial recording but it does help to set the scene and explain the use of the last letter of the alphabet.

"Let’s imagine we’re in Holland and we’re underneath the moon,

Let’s walk a little, talk a little, kiss a little,

Cling a little, sigh a little, sing a little tune…

Zing a Little Zong"

The Billboard review of "Zing" was enthusiastic. "Bing Crosby and Jane Wyman team up for a sock waxing of this cute novelty ditty from their flick Just for You. Bing sounds more relaxed than he has in a long time and the thrush carries her part in fine fashion. The Jud Conlon Rhythmaires help out spiritedly. Side should get a lot of plays and spins due to impact of movie."

“Zing a Little Zong” was nominated for the Best Original Song of 1952 at the 25th Academy Awards. It was performed at the televised ceremony by Peggy Lee and Johnny Mercer. It lost to "High Noon".

== LP releases ==
The songs were featured on a 10-inch vinyl LP numbered DL 5417 and in a 4-disc 45 rpm box set numbered 9-350.

== LP track listing ==
Side 1

1. "Just for You” recorded February 14, 1952, Bing Crosby with Camarata and His Orchestra.
2. "On the 10:10 from Ten-Ten-Tennessee” recorded May 8, 1952, Bing Crosby with Ben Lessy and Nathan Van Cleave and His Orchestra.
3. “He’s Just Crazy for Me” recorded in 1952, Jane Wyman with Dave Barbour and His Orchestra.
4. “Checkin’ My Heart” recorded in 1952, Jane Wyman with Dave Barbour and His Orchestra.

Side 2

5. "Zing a Little Zong” recorded May 8, 1952, Bing Crosby with Jane Wyman, Nathan Van Cleave and His Orchestra, and Jud Conlon’s Rhythmaires.
6. “The Maiden of Guadalupe” recorded in 1952, Jane Wyman with Dave Barbour and His Orchestra.
7. "I’ll Si-si Ya in Bahia" recorded February 21, 1952, Bing Crosby with The Andrews Sisters and John Scott Trotter and His Orchestra.
8. "The Live Oak Tree" recorded February 21, 1952, Bing Crosby with The Andrews Sisters and John Scott Trotter and His Orchestra.

The songs featuring Crosby were subsequently included in a 12” Decca LP numbered DL4263 issued in 1962 and subtitled “Zing a Little Zong” as part of the Bing's Hollywood series.
