= Violin Concerto No. 2 (Wieniawski) =

Concerto by Henryk Wieniawski

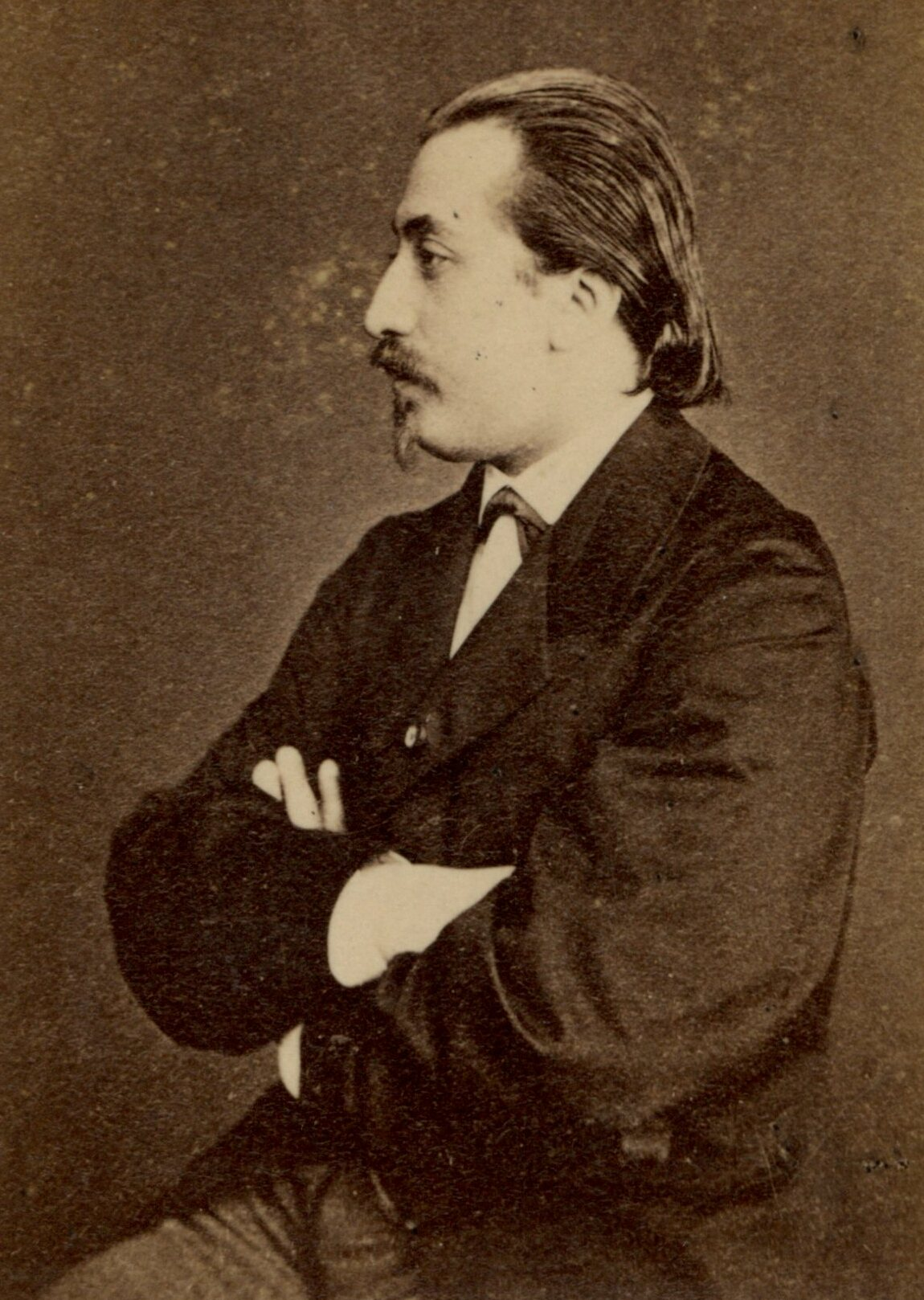
Henryk Wieniawski

Violin Concerto No. 2 in D minor, Op. 22, by the Polish violin virtuoso, Henryk Wieniawski, may have been started in 1856, but the first performance did not take place until November 27, 1862, when he played it in Saint Petersburg with Anton Rubinstein conducting. It was published in 1879, inscribed to his dear friend Pablo de Sarasate.

Written during the relatively stable period of Wieniawski's residence in St Petersburg, the second Violin Concerto in D minor, Op. 22 is generally considered as his finest work. Richly melodic and highly idiomatic the work balances the elements of style dispassionately and serenely. Wieniawski first played the work in Saint Petersburg on 27 November 1862 under the baton of Anton Rubinstein.

The second violin concerto remains one of the most popular violin concertos of the Romantic era, memorable for its lush and moving melodies and harmonies.

== Structure ==
III. Allegro con fuoco – Allegro moderato
Performed by the United States Marine Band

The work is in three movements:

1. Allegro moderato in D minor/F major
2. Romance: Andante non troppo in B♭ major
3. Allegro con fuoco – Allegro moderato (à la Zingara) in D minor/D major

=== I. Allegro moderato ===
Both main elements of the first movement, its sombre, restless first subject, and its lyrical pendant (begun by a solo horn) are discussed freely and subject to dazzling embellishments by the solo violin. This movement includes a demanding variety of technique, including upbow staccato, chromatic glissandi, double stops, arpeggios, sixths, octaves, thirds, chromatic scales, and artificial harmonics, not to mention a myriad of bowing techniques. The beat is based on a 4/4 or common time. The first movement uses a half-sonata form where the orchestral coda after the exposition transitions into the second movement instead of a development section.

=== II. Romance: Andante non troppo ===
The slow movement, a romance, follows without a break. It is based on a lilting tune in 12/8 time and rises to an impassioned central climax.

=== III. Allegro con fuoco – Allegro moderato ===
A rhapsodic passage marked Allegro con fuoco and mainly a solo cadenza, leads to the finale, a dashing rondo in the Gypsy style, which quotes the first movement's subsidiary theme in the course of its second and third episodes. The final movement implements a 2/4 time, which allows the violinists to emphasize certain notes in the beginning of some measures.

== Instrumentation ==
The concerto is scored for solo violin and an orchestra consisting of 2 flutes, 2 oboes, 2 clarinets, 2 bassoons, 2 horns, 2 trumpets, 3 trombones (alto, tenor and bass), timpani, and strings.

== In popular culture ==
The theme from the 2nd movement, the Romance, was used for the popular song "My Love and Devotion", written by Howard Barnes, Harold Fields and Joe Roncoroni under the collective pseudonym Milton Carson, and recorded by Doris Day, Perry Como, and Matt Monro, among others. The song won Most Outstanding Song, Musically and Lyrically, at the 1963 Ivor Novello Awards.
