= Sudden Fear =

1952 film noir by David Miller

- Theatrical release poster
- Directed by: David Miller
- Screenplay by: Lenore J. Coffee; Robert Smith
- Based on: Sudden Fear; 1948 novel by Edna Sherry
- Produced by: Joseph Kaufman
- Starring: Joan Crawford; Jack Palance; Gloria Grahame
- Cinematography: Charles Lang
- Edited by: Leon Barsha
- Music by: Elmer Bernstein
- Color process: Black and white
- Production company: Joseph Kaufmann Productions
- Distributed by: RKO Radio Pictures
- Release date: August 7, 1952 (New York City)
- Running time: 110 minutes
- Country: United States
- Language: English
- Budget: $600,000
- Box office: $1.65 million (USA rentals)

Sudden Fear is a 1952 American noir thriller film starring Joan Crawford and Jack Palance in a tale about a successful woman who marries a murderous man. Directed by David Miller, the screenplay by Lenore J. Coffee and Robert Smith was based upon the novel of the same name by Edna Sherry.

== Plot ==
Myra Hudson is a successful Broadway playwright who rejects Lester Blaine as the leading man in her new play. She subsequently meets him on a train bound for San Francisco and is swept off her feet. After a brief courtship they marry.

When Lester's former lover and fellow scam artist Irene Neves shows up, he is not happy to see her, fearing she could spoil his situation. But she has enough leverage that they are soon secret lovers.

Myra's lawyer Steve drafts a will that includes a bequest of $10,000 a year for Lester, to be terminated if he remarries. Myra decides instead to leave him everything, and records her revision on the SoundScriber. Guests are arriving for a party and in her hurry she forgets to turn it off.

During the party, Lester and Irene meet in Myra's office, where they see Steve's draft of the will on her desk. Unaware of Myra's favorable revision, they discuss how to kill her before the will can be finalized. Their conversation is recorded, so when Myra listens to the SoundScriber in the morning she learns everything.

Devastated, her initial fear and despair gradually give way to defiance, and she plots her revenge.

The recording reveals that Lester has a key to Irene's apartment and that Irene has a gun. After obtaining a duplicate key, Myra takes the gun and forges two notes designed to lure Irene out of her apartment before Lester arrives for a rendezvous. Myra intends to kill Lester there with Irene's gun, framing her.

As planned, Irene leaves and Myra hides in the closet, but while waiting she has a change of heart. She drops the gun and is going to leave but is back in the closet because Lester arrives. Myra is able to slip out unobserved, but Lester notices a handkerchief she dropped. Realizing she has been there and knows everything, he gives chase, but loses her.

Lester takes after Myra in his car. When Irene appears in the distance, he mistakes her for Myra and speeds towards her to run her down. Myra sees what is about to happen and calls out to save Irene. Lester recognizes Irene and slams on the brakes but loses control of the car. Lester and Irene are killed in the crash.

Myra is grief-stricken but quickly regains her composure and walks home resolutely.

== Cast ==
- Joan Crawford as Myra Hudson
- Jack Palance as Lester Blaine
- Gloria Grahame as Irene Neves
- Bruce Bennett as Steve Kearney
- Virginia Huston as Ann Taylor
- Mike Connors (billed as Touch Conners) as Junior Kearney

== Reception ==
=== Critical response ===
When the film was released, the film critic for The New York Times, A. H. Weiler, reviewed the film favorably: "Joan Crawford should be credited with a truly professional performance in Sudden Fear ... The entire production has been mounted in excellent taste and, it must be pointed out, that San Francisco and Los Angeles, Bunker Hill area, in which most of the action takes place, is an excitingly photogenic area. David Miller, the director, has taken full advantage of the city's steep streets and panoramic views. And, in his climactic scenes in a darkened apartment and a chase through its precipitous dark alleys and backyards he has managed to project an authentically doom-filled atmosphere."

Otis L. Guernsey Jr., also wrote a positive review in the New York Herald Tribune. He wrote: "The scenario...is designed to allow Miss Crawford a wide range of quivering reactions to vicious events, as she passes through the stage of starry-eyed love, terrible disillusionment, fear, hatred, and finally hysteria. With her wide eyes and forceful bearing, she is the woman for the job."

Village Voice reviewer Melissa Anderson wrote in 2016 that Sudden Fear "fits into and defies different genres, its convention-scrambling partly the result of the fact that the film looks both forward and back." Dennis Schwartz liked the film, but questioned some of the film's plot points, saying that "David Miller stylishly directs this disturbing psychological gargoyle thriller ... [Yet] ... the suspense is marred by plot devices that don't hold up to further scrutiny. Joan Crawford has a chance to act out on her hysteria after her happy marriage is unmasked as a charade, and does a fine job of trying to remain calm while knowing her hubby and [his] girlfriend are planning to kill her ... The film is grandly topped off by Charles B. Lang Jr. and his remarkably glossy black-and-white photography."

In 1984, film noir historian Spencer Selby noted, "Undoubtedly one of the most stylish and refined woman-in-distress noirs."

== Accolades ==
Joan Crawford received her third and final Oscar nomination for this film, the only time she competed against arch-rival Bette Davis for Best Actress, who was nominated (for the ninth time) for The Star. Neither actress won (Shirley Booth took home the award for Come Back, Little Sheba). Jack Palance also received his first of three nominations for Best Supporting Actor. (He lost to Anthony Quinn for Viva Zapata!.)

Award	Category	Nominee(s)	Result	Ref.
Academy Awards	Best Actress	Joan Crawford	Nominated	
Academy Awards	Best Supporting Actor	Jack Palance	Nominated	
Academy Awards	Best Cinematography – Black-and-White	Charles Lang	Nominated	
Academy Awards	Best Costume Design – Black-and-White	Sheila O'Brien	Nominated	
Golden Globe Awards	Best Actress in a Motion Picture – Drama	Joan Crawford	Nominated	
Laurel Awards	Best Female Dramatic Performance	Joan Crawford	Won	
Photoplay Awards	Most Popular Female Star	Joan Crawford	Won	

== Home media ==
Sudden Fear was first released on VHS by Kino Video. Kino also released the film on Region 1 DVD in 2003. In 2006, the film was also released as part of Film Noir - The Dark Side of Hollywood DVD box set by Kino Video. In 2016, the film was released on Blu-ray by Cohen Film Collection.
