= When Irish Eyes Are Smiling (album) =

When Irish Eyes Are Smiling: A Collection of Old and New Songs of Erin

Compilation album by Bing Crosby
- Released: 1952
- Recorded: 1947–1951
- Genre: Popular
- Length: 23:21
- Label: Decca

Bing Crosby chronology
Bing and Connee (w/ Connie Boswell) (1952)	When Irish Eyes Are Smiling: A Collection of Old and New Songs of Erin (1952)	Themes and Songs from The Quiet Man (w/ Victor Young) (1952)

When Irish Eyes Are Smiling is a Decca Records album by Bing Crosby of songs with an Irish theme. It was issued as a 10-inch LP as catalog No.DL 5403. Some of the songs had earlier been issued as a 3-disc 45 rpm set (9-89).

A later 12-inch LP version with the same title was issued in 1956 as DL8262 with a different selection of songs.

== Background ==
The maternal side of Crosby’s family had come from Ireland in the 19th century and he had grown up hearing traditional Irish songs. The first Irish song he recorded was “Did Your Mother Come from Ireland?” in 1940 and from then on, songs related to the Emerald Isle were a regular part of his catalog. The success of an earlier Crosby album of Irish songs encouraged Decca to put together another album of similarly themed tracks. This included two new songs which were reviewed by Billboard as follows:
St. Patrick’s Day Parade - Bing, in high spirits, turns on his winning Irish brogue for a sparkling etching of a new St Patty’s ditty of superior quality. Add another solid standard item to the lengthy Crosby list.
With My Shillelagh Under My Arm - Performance-wise, the same level of spirit and vigor is accomplished here but the song isn’t quite as strong as topside’s.

== Track listing for 10" LP ==
Recording dates follow song titles.

Side one
No.	Title	Writer(s)	Performed with	Length
1.	"When Irish Eyes Are Smiling" (May 7, 1946)	Chauncey Olcott, George Graff, Jr., Ernest Ball	John Scott Trotter and His Orchestra	2:52
2.	"The Rose of Tralee" (July 17, 1945)	Edward Mordaunt Spencer, Charles William Glover	John Scott Trotter and His Orchestra	3:10
3.	"My Girl's an Irish Girl" (November 13, 1947)	Jack Popplewell	Victor Young and His Orchestra	2:59
4.	"Galway Bay" (November 27, 1947)	Arthur Colahan	Victor Young and His Orchestra	2:56

Side two
No.	Title	Writer(s)	Performed with	Length
1.	"How Can You Buy Killarney?" (November 6, 1949)	Joseph Hamilton Kennedy, Fred Grundland, Ted Steels, Gerald Morrison	Victor Young and His Orchestra	3:02
2.	"Eileen" (November 6, 1949)	Max Liebman, Sylvia Fine	Victor Young and His Orchestra	3:47
3.	"With My Shillelagh Under My Arm" (February 1, 1951)	Raymond Wallace, Billy O'Brien	Matty Matlock and His Orchestra	2:26
4.	"St. Patrick’s Day Parade" (February 1, 1951)	Johnny Lange, Hy Heath	Matty Matlock and His Orchestra	2:09
