= 1952 New York Film Critics Circle Awards =

18th New York Film Critics Circle Awards

18th New York Film Critics Circle Awards

January 17, 1953
(announced December 29, 1952)

High Noon

The 18th New York Film Critics Circle Awards, honored the best filmmaking of 1952.

== Winners ==
- Best Film:
  - High Noon
- Best Actor:
  - Ralph Richardson - Breaking the Sound Barrier
- Best Actress:
  - Shirley Booth - Come Back, Little Sheba
- Best Director:
  - Fred Zinnemann - High Noon
- Best Foreign Language Film:
  - Forbidden Games (Jeux interdits) • France
