= Forbidden Games =

- Theatrical release poster
- Directed by: René Clément
- Written by: Jean Aurenche; Pierre Bost
- Based on: Les Jeux Interdits by François Boyer
- Produced by: Robert Dorfmann
- Starring: Georges Poujouly; Brigitte Fossey; Amédée
- Cinematography: Robert Juillard
- Edited by: Roger Dwyre
- Music by: Robert de Visée and anon, music performed by Narciso Yepes
- Production companies: Silver Films; Metro-Goldwyn-Mayer
- Distributed by: Les Films Corona; Loew's Inc. (USA)
- Release dates: 9 May 1952 (France); 8 December 1952 (USA)
- Running time: 86 minutes
- Country: France
- Language: French
- Box office: $36.8 million

Forbidden Games (French: Jeux Interdits) is a 1952 French war drama film directed by René Clément and based on François Boyer's novel Les Jeux Interdits.

While not initially successful in France, the film was a hit elsewhere. It won the Golden Lion at the Venice Film Festival, a Special Award as Best Foreign Language Film in the United States, and a Best Film from any Source at the British Academy Film Awards.

== Plot ==
It is June 1940, during the Battle of France. After five-year-old Paulette's parents and pet dog die in a German air attack on a column of refugees fleeing Paris, the traumatized child meets 10-year-old Michel Dollé whose peasant family takes her in. She quickly becomes attached to Michel. The two attempt to cope with the death and destruction that surrounds them by secretly building a small cemetery among the ruins of an abandoned watermill, where they bury her dog and start to bury other animals, marking their graves with crosses stolen from a local graveyard, including one belonging to Michel's brother. Michel's father first suspects that Michel's brother's cross was stolen from the graveyard by his neighbour. Eventually, the father finds out that Michel has stolen the cross.

Meanwhile, the French gendarmes come to the Dollé household in order to take Paulette. Michel cannot bear the thought of her leaving and tells his father that he would tell him where the stolen crosses are, but in return he should not give Paulette to the gendarmes. When his father doesn't keep his promise, Michel destroys the crosses by throwing them into the stream. Paulette ends up going to a Red Cross camp, but at the end of the film is seen running away into a crowd of people in the camp, crying for Michel and then for her mother.

== Cast ==
- Georges Poujouly as Michel Dollé
- Brigitte Fossey as Paulette
- Amédée as Francis Gouard
- Laurence Badie as Berthe Dollé
- Suzanne Courtal as Madame Dollé
- Lucien Hubert as Dollé
- Jacques Marin as Georges Dollé
- Pierre Merovée as Raymond Dollé
- Louis Saintève as The Priest

== Reception ==
The film was widely praised among critics, whose "howling protests" were heard at the 1952 Cannes Film Festival where it was not an "official entry of France"; instead, it was "screened on the fringe of the Competition."

The film was entered into competition at the 13th Venice International Film Festival; festival organizers at first considered the film ineligible because it had been screened at Cannes; it ended up receiving the Golden Lion, the Festival's highest prize.

Upon its release, it was lambasted by some, who said it was a "vicious and unfair picture of the peasantry of France"; in France, 4,910,835 theater tickets were sold, making it the most successful film at the French box office in 1952. Following its December 1952 release in the United States, Bosley Crowther called it a film with "the irony of a Grand Illusion, the authenticity of a Harvest and the finesse of French films at their best"; according to Crowther, the film is a "brilliant and devastating drama of the tragic frailties of men, clear and uncorrupted by sentimentality or dogmatism in its candid view of life."

At the 25th Academy Awards, Forbidden Games won an out-of-competition Special Award as Best Foreign Language Film. In December 1952, at the 24th National Board of Review Awards it was chosen as one of that year's five top foreign films. At the 1952 New York Film Critics Circle Awards, it won for Best Foreign Language Film.

In 1954, it was BAFTA's Best Film from any Source; in 1955, at the 27th Academy Awards, François Boyer was nominated for an Academy Award for Best Story; Philip Yordan won, for his work on Broken Lance.

Decades after its release, David Ehrenstein called it "deeply touching" and wrote: "Fossey's is quite simply one of the most uncanny pieces of acting ever attempted by a youngster. Clément’s sensitivity doubtless accounts for much of what we see here, but the rest is clearly Fossey’s own."

Forbidden Games has an approval rating of 100% on review aggregator website Rotten Tomatoes, based on 19 reviews, and an average rating of 8.8/10.

Roger Ebert added the film to his Great Movies collection in 2005, writing: "Movies like Clement's "Forbidden Games" cannot work unless they are allowed to be completely simple, without guile, transparent. Despite the scenes I have described, it is never a tear-jerker. It doesn't try to create emotions, but to observe them."

== Soundtrack ==
The main theme of the soundtrack is a guitar arrangement of the melody "Romance," performed by Narciso Yepes.

== Home media ==
Forbidden Games was released on Laserdisc in 1988 by Criterion Collection (under license of Turner and MGM/UA Home Video), who later also released it on DVD in 2004 by license of Warner Bros. and Turner Entertainment Co.
