= Themes and Songs from The Quiet Man =

Compilation album by Victor Young, Bing Crosby
- Released: 1952
- Recorded: 1947–1951
- Genre: Popular
- Label: Decca

Bing Crosby chronology
When Irish Eyes Are Smiling (1952)	Themes and Songs from The Quiet Man (1952)	Selections from "Just for You" (w/ Jane Wyman and The Andrews Sisters) (1952)

Themes and Songs from The Quiet Man is a Decca Records album by Victor Young and Bing Crosby featuring the music used in the Republic Pictures film The Quiet Man. It was issued as a 10-inch LP with catalog No. DL5411 and as a 4-disc 45 rpm set (9–342).

== Background ==
Victor Young was chosen to compose the score for The Quiet Man and the actual soundtrack included several traditional Irish airs. This album, however, mainly has Young’s own compositions for the film. Throughout the movie, the tune “Isle of Innisfree” is heard on many occasions and Decca Records decided to include Bing Crosby’s recording of it to add commercial appeal and they also added Crosby’s huge hit from 1947 “Galway Bay” for the same reason.

== Reception ==
Billboard liked it, saying inter alia: “Here is album to gladden the heart of those who have a sentimental attachment for the “Old Sod,” as well as many others. It contains some lovely, melodic and spirited new tunes written for the John Ford flick “The Quiet Man”. In addition, set contains three old favorites “Galway Bay” and “The Isle of Innisfree,” both of which are sung by Bing Crosby, and “I’ll Take You Home Again Kathleen.”…. With the impact of the movie this set could be a salable item. Cover and back liner are attractive.” The retail rating was 77 (out of 100).

== Track listing for 10" LP ==
All orchestral music on the album was supplied by Victor Young and His Orchestra and recorded in March 1951 except where marked. All of the music was composed by Victor Young except tracks 3, 6 and 7.

Side 1

1. "Danaher's House"
2. "My Mother”
3. "Isle of Innisfree", recorded December 19, 1951, by Bing Crosby with John Scott Trotter and His Orchestra.
4. "The Big Fight"

Side 2

5. "Mary Kate's Lament”
6. “Galway Bay”, recorded November 27, 1947 by Bing Crosby.
7. “I'll Take You Home Again, Kathleen”
8. “St. Patrick’s Day"
