= 1952 in British television =

This is a list of British television related events from 1952.

== Events ==
=== January ===
- 16 January – Sooty, Harry Corbett's glove puppet bear, first appears on the BBC Television Service.

=== February ===
- 1 February – The GPO's first TV detector van is demonstrated. It is designed to track down users of unlicensed television sets.
- 15 February – State funeral of George VI: The funeral procession through London is televised in the UK, but not the ceremony inside St George's Chapel, Windsor Castle.
- 19 February – The BBC Children's Department begins screening the series Billy Bunter of Greyfriars School with scripts by 'Frank Richards' (Charles Hamilton), author of the original Greyfriars School stories, and Gerald Campion (aged 29) playing Billy Bunter (aged 14/15). Originally they are broadcast live, with a second performance later on the same evening.

=== March ===
- 14 March – The BBC Television Service is launched in Scotland.

=== July ===
- 20 July – Arrow to the Heart, the first collaboration between director Rudolph Cartier and scriptwriter Nigel Kneale, is broadcast on the BBC Television Service.

=== August ===
- 15 August – The original Wenvoe transmitting station in the Vale of Glamorgan begins transmitting BBC Television to south Wales and the west of England.

=== October ===
- 21 October – BBC Television's main football commentator Jimmy Jewell dies after suffering a stroke.

=== December ===
- 15 December – Children's puppet series Bill and Ben, The Flower Pot Men premieres on the BBC Television Service, de facto start of Watch with Mother (although this is not so named until April 1953).
- 20 December – The Wenvoe transmitting station begins broadcasting on full power.
- 31 December – BBC television ends the day with New Year's Eve Party from St Thomas' Hospital, London, hosted by Richard Dimbleby.
- December – For the Children comes to an end after 15 years in 2 separate runs.

== Debuts ==
- 19 February – Billy Bunter of Greyfriars School (1952–1961)
- 15 March – The Broken Horseshoe (1952)
- 30 July – My Wife Jacqueline (1952)
- 2 October – The Appleyards (1952–1957)
- 25 October – Operation Diplomat (1952)
- 4 November – Huckleberry Finn (1952)
- 18 December – The Flower Pot Men (1952–1958, 2001–2002)
- 28 December – Markheim (1952)
- 30 December – The Silver Swan (1952–1953)
- Unknown
  - All Your Own (1952–1961)
  - Animal, Vegetable, Mineral? (1952–1959)
  - The Howerd Crowd (1952)

== Continuing television shows ==
=== 1920s ===
- BBC Wimbledon (1927–1939, 1946–2019, 2021–present)

=== 1930s ===
- Trooping the Colour (1937–1939, 1946–2019, 2023–present)
- The Boat Race (1938–1939, 1946–2019, 2021–present)
- BBC Cricket (1939, 1946–1999, 2020–2024)

=== 1940s ===
- Kaleidoscope (1946–1953)
- Muffin the Mule (1946–1955, 2005–2006)
- Café Continental (1947–1953)
- Television Newsreel (1948–1954)
- The Ed Sullivan Show (1948–1971)
- Come Dancing (1949–1998)
- How Do You View? (1949–1953)

=== 1950s ===
- Andy Pandy (1950–1970, 2002–2005)

== Ending this year ==
- Picture Page (1936–1939, 1946–1952)
- For the Children (1937–1939, 1946–1952)

== Births ==
- 29 January
  - Tim Healy, actor
  - Samir Shah, Indian-born television executive
- 2 March – John Altman, actor
- 4 April – Cherie Lunghi, actress
- 9 May – Patrick Ryecart, actor
- 22 June – Alastair Stewart, ITN journalist and newscaster
- 11 July – John Kettley, weatherman
- 22 September – Gary Holton, actor and musician (died 1985)
- 27 September – Rob Bonnet, BBC sports presenter and journalist
- 30 September – Jack Wild, actor (died 2006)
- 4 October – Kirsten Cooke, actress
- 9 October – Sharon Osbourne, music manager and promoter and television personality and presenter
- 3 December – Mel Smith, comic actor and director (died 2013)
- 10 December – Clive Anderson, comedy writer and radio and television personality
- 20 December – Jenny Agutter, actress

== See also ==
- 1952 in British music
- 1952 in the United Kingdom
- List of British films of 1952
