= 6th Directors Guild of America Awards =

- Date: 1954
- Country: United States
- Presented by: Directors Guild of America

Highlights
- Best Director Feature Film: From Here to Eternity – Fred Zinnemann
- Best Director Television: Four Star Playhouse for "The Last Voyage" – Robert Florey
- Website: https://www.dga.org/Awards/History/1950s/1953.aspx?value=1953

The 6th Directors Guild of America Awards, honoring the outstanding directorial achievements in film and television in 1953, were presented in 1954.

== Winners and nominees ==
=== Film ===
Feature Film

Fred Zinnemann – From Here to Eternity

- Melvin Frank and Norman Panama – Above and Beyond
- Henry Koster – The Robe
- Walter Lang – Call Me Madam
- Joseph L. Mankiewicz – Julius Caesar
- Daniel Mann – Come Back, Little Sheba
- Jean Negulesco – Titanic
- George Sidney – Young Bess
- George Stevens – Shane
- Charles Walters – Lili
- Billy Wilder – Stalag 17
- William Wyler – Roman Holiday

=== Television ===
Television

Robert Florey – Four Star Playhouse for "The Last Voyage"

- Richard Irving – Chevron Theatre for "Too Gloomy for Private Pushkin"
- Roy Kellino – Schlitz Playhouse of Stars for "Desert Tragedy"
- Lew Landers – Topper for The Masquerade
- Jack Webb – Dragnet for "The Big Little Jesus"

=== D.W. Griffith Award ===
- John Ford
