= National Board of Review Awards 1952 =

Annual film awards

24th National Board of Review Awards

December 29, 1952

The 24th National Board of Review Awards were announced on December 29, 1952.

== Top Ten Films ==
1. The Quiet Man
2. High Noon
3. Limelight
4. 5 Fingers
5. The Snows of Kilimanjaro
6. The Thief
7. The Bad and the Beautiful
8. Singin' in the Rain
9. Above and Beyond
10. My Son John

== Top Foreign Films ==
1. Breaking the Sound Barrier
2. The Man in the White Suit
3. Forbidden Games
4. Beauty and the Devil
5. Ivory Hunter

== Winners ==
- Best Film: The Quiet Man
- Best Foreign Film: Breaking the Sound Barrier
- Best Actor: Ralph Richardson (Breaking the Sound Barrier)
- Best Actress: Shirley Booth (Come Back, Little Sheba)
- Best Director: David Lean (Breaking the Sound Barrier)
