= Take My Heart =

Single by Al Martino
- B-side: "I Never Cared"
- Released: 1952
- Genre: Pop
- Length: 3:03
- Label: Capitol Records
- Songwriters: William (Bill) Borrelli, Pat Genaro

Al Martino singles chronology
"Here in My Heart" (1952)	"Take My Heart" (1952)	"I've Never Seen" (1952)

"Take My Heart" is a song that was released by Al Martino in 1952. It peaked at number 9 on the UK Singles Chart, spending one week in the top 12. In the U.S., the song reached number 12 during an eight-week stay.

Vic Damone also recorded the song and he enjoyed a brief chart success in the US reaching the number 30 spot in 1952. A version by Toni Arden was also issued in 1952.
