= Because You're Mine (song) =

1952 popular song

Single by Mario Lanza

from the album Because You're Mine
- A-side: "Because You're Mine" "The Song Angels Sing"
- Released: August 23, 1952
- Genre: Vocal pop
- Length: 3:37
- Label: RCA Victor
- Composer: Nicholas Brodszky
- Lyricist: Sammy Cahn

Mario Lanza singles chronology
"Because" (1951)	"Because You're Mine" (1952)	"Song of India" (1953)

"Because You're Mine" is a song written by Nicholas Brodszky with lyrics by Sammy Cahn taken from the 1952 musical film of the same title. It was recorded by Mario Lanza (who starred in the film) and Nat King Cole in two different versions, which were both released as singles in 1952. In the US, Lanza's record reached No. 7 in the Billboard charts and Nat King Cole's version achieved the No. 16 position. The Mario Lanza recording also reached No. 3 in the UK Singles Chart, spending 24 weeks within the top 12, and was Lanza's only UK Top 12 hit. The Nat King Cole recording was included on his album Top Pops, placed three spots lower and spent three weeks on the chart. The Mario Lanza recording was one of his three million-selling singles.

The song (sung by Billy Daniels at the Awards show) had received a nomination for the Academy Award for Best Original Song in 1952, but lost out to "The Ballad of High Noon".

== Cover versions ==
- Kitty Kallen – included in her album If I Give My Heart to You (1960).
- Vera Lynn – for her album Yours (1961).
- Al Martino (1962).
- Connie Stevens – included in her CD From Me To You (1962).
- Keely Smith – for her album Because You're Mine (1962).
- Jerry Vale – in his album Be My Love (1964).
- James Darren's version reached No. 30 on the U.S. Easy Listening chart (1965).
- Placido Domingo – for his album Be My Love (1989).
