= Devil Take Us =

1952 film

- Film poster
- Directed by: Herbert Morgan
- Written by: Herbert Morgan
- Produced by: Herbert Morgan
- Cinematography: Floyd Crosby
- Production company: Theatre of Life Productions
- Distributed by: RKO Pictures
- Release date: 1952
- Country: United States
- Language: English

Devil Take Us is a 1952 American short documentary film on driving safety directed by Herbert Morgan. It was part of the Theatre of Life documentary series. It was nominated for two Academy Awards, one for Best Documentary Short and the other for Best Two-Reel Short.
