= My Love and Devotion =

"My Love and Devotion" is a song written by Howard Barnes, Harold Fields and Joe Roncoroni under the collective pseudonym Milton Carson, that was recorded by Doris Day in 1952. It peaked at number 10 on the UK Singles Chart.

Other recordings of the song include versions by Perry Como, recorded in 1952, and Matt Monro. Monro's version reached number 29 in the UK Singles Chart in November 1962. The song won Most Outstanding Song, Musically and Lyrically at the 8th Ivor Novello Awards held on 4 May 1963 and broadcast live on BBC television.

The tune is based on the theme of the second movement of the Violin Concerto No. 2 by the Polish violin virtuoso and composer Henryk Wieniawski, which dates from 1862.
