= Ben Lessy =

American actor

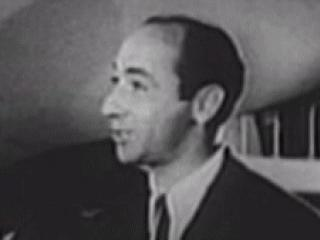
- In Second Chorus (1940)
- Born: Benjamin Lesinsky; April 29, 1902; New York City, U.S.
- Died: October 30, 1992 (aged 90); Beverly Hills, California, U.S.
- Resting place: Glen Haven Memorial Park in Sylmar, California, U.S.
- Occupations: Actor; Comedian
- Years active: 1933–1981

Ben Lessy (born Benjamin Lesinsky; April 29, 1902 – October 30, 1992) was an American nightclub comedian and television and film actor.

== Early life ==
He was born in New York City.

== Career ==
Lessy was known for a nightclub act done with Patti Moore, the long-time wife of his best friend and agent, Sammy Lewis. They were regulars at Los Angeles nightclubs Slapsy Maxie's and Billy Gray's Band Box. Lessy appeared in over 50 films and television episodes between 1938 and 1981. His first film role was in the two reel Cafe Rendezvous (1938) and his career ended with the Billy Wilder film Buddy Buddy (1981). Other credits include Music for Millions (1944), Dark Delusion (1947) (the last entry in the Metro-Goldwyn-Mayer Dr. Kildare series),The Pirate (1948) (Lessy's 9th, and final film during his seven years at MGM),The Jackie Robinson Story (1950), Just for You (1952), Gypsy (1962), It's a Mad, Mad, Mad, Mad World (1963), Pajama Party (1964), That Darn Cat! (1965), and The Love Machine (1971). On the small screen, he was frequently seen during the 1950s on the popular sitcom Make Room for Daddy, whose creator/star Danny Thomas dubbed Lessy "one of the greatest living generators of laughter". Lessy also did a number of variety and talk show spots alongside nightclub partner Moore; these include Ed Sullivan's Toast of the Town, The Frank Sinatra Show, The NBC Comedy Hour, Juke Box Jury, The John Conte Show, The Woody Woodbury Show, and Merv Griffin. Other TV credits include Telephone Time (1957), The Jack Benny Program (1959–64: 3 episodes), The Cara Williams Show (1964–1965), The Gypsy Rose Lee Show, That Girl (1966), Petticoat Junction (1967), The New Andy Griffith Show (1971), and McMillan & Wife (1976).

== Death ==
Lessy died on October 30, 1992, aged 90 from natural causes. His remains are interred at Sholom Memorial Park in Sylmar, California.

== Filmography ==
- Second Chorus (1940) - Shaw's Second Manager (uncredited)
- Woman of the Year (1942) - Punchy (uncredited)
- For Me and My Gal (1942) - Dough Boy Dan (uncredited)
- Youth on Parade (1942) - Piano Player (uncredited)
- Thousands Cheer (1943) - Silent Monk
- Music for Millions (1944) - Kickebush
- Her Highness and the Bellboy (1945) - Himself
- Two Sisters from Boston (1946) - Rogetto - Olstrom's Valet (uncredited)
- Dark Delusion (1947) - Napoleon
- The Pirate (1948) - Gumbo
- The Jackie Robinson Story (1950) - Shorty
- Purple Heart Diary (1951) - Himself
- Just for You (1952) - Georgie Polansky
- Gypsy (1962) - Mervyn Goldstone
- It's a Mad, Mad, Mad, Mad World (1963) - George, the steward (uncredited)
- I'd Rather Be Rich (1964) - 1st Hunter (uncredited)
- Pajama Party (1964) - Fleegle
- That Funny Feeling (1965) - Charlie - Bartender
- That Darn Cat! (1965) - Drive-In Concessionaire (uncredited)
- The Last of the Secret Agents? (1966) - Harry
- The Fastest Guitar Alive (1967) - Indian Chief
- The Love Machine (1971) - Kenny Ditto
- Buddy Buddy (1981) - Barney Pritzig (final film role)
