= Howard Barnes =

Howard Ellington Riddiford Barnes (1 November 1909 – 28 December 1991), sometimes known as "Boogie" Barnes, was an English popular song lyricist.

Barnes was born in Fulham, London. As an amateur footballer in 1930, he joined Wimbledon F.C., playing as an inside-left. He also played for Crystal Palace F.C. in the 1934/35 season before returning to Wimbledon. In January 1936, he played in the England amateur international trial, but never played at international level. In 1937 he joined Charlton F.C.

In 1941, he was injured as the result of an air raid in London, after which he had one leg amputated. He then worked as a lyricist of popular songs. According to BMI, he is credited with almost 200 songs. His earliest successes came as part of a writing partnership with Harry Fields and Joe Roncoroni, who collectively used the name John Jerome. Working with composer Bernard Grun, they wrote "Broken Wings", first recorded by Dickie Valentine and a number one hit in Britain in 1953 for The Stargazers. Also with Fields and Roncoroni, this time using the collective pseudonym Milton Carson, Barnes wrote "My Love and Devotion", recorded by Doris Day, Perry Como, and Matt Monro, among others. The song won Most Outstanding Song, Musically and Lyrically, at the 1963 Ivor Novello Awards. Other songs written by the team of Barnes, Fields and Roncoroni include "A Blossom Fell", a hit for Nat King Cole, Dickie Valentine and others; and "Tulips and Heather", recorded by Fred Waring and his Pennsylvanians, and by Perry Como.

He is credited with the advertising line "Murray Mint, Murray Mint, the too good to hurry mint", originally included in the Stargazers' 1955 song "Sorry, You'll Have To Wait". In the late 1950s and 1960s, Barnes frequently collaborated on songs with composer and vocal group arranger Cliff Adams, who had been a founder member of the Stargazers.

Barnes died in Bromley in 1991 at the age of 82.
