= The Garden Spider =

1952 film

- Directed by: Alberto Ancilotto
- Written by: Alberto Ancilotto
- Produced by: Alberto Ancilotto
- Release date: 1952
- Country: Italy
- Language: English

The Garden Spider (Italian: Epeira Diadema) is a 1952 Italian short documentary film directed by Alberto Ancilotto. It was nominated for an Academy Award for Best Documentary Short.
