= Sheila O'Brien =

American costume designer (1902–1983)

- Born: October 9, 1902; Texas, United States
- Died: January 26, 1983 (aged 80); Los Angeles, California
- Occupation: costume designer
- Years active: 1939 - 1965

Sheila O’Brien (October 9, 1902 in Texas – January 26, 1983) was an American costume designer.

O'Brien began her career as a seamstress for Paramount Pictures but transferred to the costume department of MGM, where she worked as a costume department dresser on The Wizard of Oz in 1939, coming into her own as a Hollywood costume designer in the 1950s. She was a favourite of Joan Crawford’s, dressing her in Sudden Fear (1952, for which O’Brien received an Oscar nomination), Johnny Guitar (1954) and Female on the Beach (1955). O’Brien died of cancer in 1983.
