= The Sound Barrier =

- U.S. theatrical release poster
- Directed by: David Lean
- Written by: Terence Rattigan
- Produced by: David Lean
- Starring: Ralph Richardson; Ann Todd; Nigel Patrick; John Justin; Denholm Elliott
- Cinematography: Jack Hildyard
- Edited by: Geoffrey Foot
- Music by: Malcolm Arnold
- Color process: Black and white
- Production company: London Film Productions
- Distributed by: British Lion Films
- Release dates: 22 July 1952 (United Kingdom); 6 November 1952 (New York City); 21 December 1952 (United States)
- Running time: 117 minutes
- Country: United Kingdom
- Language: English
- Budget: £250,000
- Box office: £227,978 (UK)

The Sound Barrier is a 1952 British aviation drama film directed by David Lean. It is a fictional story about attempts by aircraft designers and test pilots to break the sound barrier. It was David Lean's third and final film with his wife Ann Todd but it was his first for Alexander Korda's London Films, following the break-up of Cineguild. The Sound Barrier stars Ralph Richardson, Ann Todd, John Justin and Nigel Patrick. It was known in the United States as Breaking Through the Sound Barrier and Breaking the Sound Barrier.

The Sound Barrier was a box-office success on first release but it has become one of the least-known of Lean's films. Following on In Which We Serve (1942), the film is another of Lean's ventures into a genre of film making where impressions of documentary film are created.

== Plot ==
After his aircraft company's ground-breaking work on jet engine technology in the Second World War, Sir John Ridgefield, its wealthy owner, employs test pilot Squadron Leader Tony Garthwaite, a successful wartime fighter pilot, to fly new jet-powered aircraft. Garthwaite is hired by Ridgefield after marrying Ridgefield's daughter, Susan. Tensions between father and daughter are accentuated by Garthwaite's dangerous job of test flying. In a noteworthy illustration of the new technology, Susan accompanies Garthwaite on a ferrying assignment of a two-seater de Havilland Vampire to Cairo, Egypt, returning later the same day as passengers on a de Havilland Comet.

Ridgefield's plan for his new jet fighter, "Prometheus", has placed the company in jeopardy. (Note: Drawing on ancient mythology, Ridgefield notes that Prometheus "stole fire from the gods".) The problems faced by the new jet aircraft in exceeding the speed of sound, the so-called "sound barrier", are ever present. Trying to break the sound barrier, Garthwaite crashes and is killed.

Shocked at the death of her husband and at her father's apparently single-minded and heartless approach to the dangers his test pilots face, Susan walks out on her father and goes to live with friends Jess and Philip Peel, another company test pilot. Ridgefield later engages Peel to take on the challenge of piloting "Prometheus" at speeds approaching the speed of sound. In a crucial flight and at the critical moment, Peel performs a counterintuitive action (foreshadowed in the opening scene of the film) which enables him to maintain control of the aircraft and to break the sound barrier. Eventually accepting that her father did care about those who died in tests, Susan changes her plan of moving to London and takes her young son with her back to live with Sir John.

== Cast ==
- Ralph Richardson as John Ridgefield
- Ann Todd as Susan Garthwaite
- Nigel Patrick as Tony Garthwaite
- John Justin as Philip Peel
- Dinah Sheridan as Jess Peel
- Joseph Tomelty as Will Sparks
- Denholm Elliott as Christopher Ridgefield
- Jack Allen as 'Windy' Williams
- Ralph Michael as Fletcher
- Sally-Jane Spencer as Daughter of Philip (uncredited)
- Rodney Goodall as Little Boy (uncredited)
- Donald Harron as ATA officer (uncredited)
- Vincent Holman as Factor (uncredited)
- Jolyon Jackley as Baby (uncredited)
- Douglas Muir as Controller (uncredited)
- Leslie Phillips as Controller (uncredited)
- Anthony Snell as Peter Makepeace (uncredited)
- Robert Brooks Turner as Test Bed Operator (uncredited)

== Production ==
The strong relationship to aviation history in The Sound Barrier has led to its being characterised as a "semi-documentary". The film pays tribute to the British effort in the historic advance in aviation of the development and final perfecting of the jet engine by Frank Whittle and Power Jets Ltd and others following.

David Lean had begun to gather research based on media reports of jet aircraft approaching supersonic speeds, interviewing British aeronautic designers. He even managed to fly with test pilots as he produced a 300-page notebook that he turned over to dramatist Terence Rattigan. The subsequent screenplay concentrated on the problems of flying at supersonic speeds and is also loosely based on the story of aircraft designer Geoffrey de Havilland and the loss of his son. Geoffrey de Havilland, Jr. was the de Havilland company test pilot who was killed on 27 September 1946 attempting to fly faster than the speed of sound in the DH 108.

Kenneth More tested for the role of Tony. He says the part was offered to David Niven, with whom More was making Appointment with Venus but Niven turned it down. The role went to Nigel Patrick, who was more strongly established than More.

John Derry, another de Havilland test pilot, has been called "Britain's first supersonic pilot", because of a dive he made on 6 September 1948 in a DH 108. Contrary to what is depicted in the film, the first aircraft to break the sound barrier was the rocket-powered Bell X-1 flown by Chuck Yeager of the United States Air Force in 1947. His feat was portrayed in the 1983 film The Right Stuff. As Yeager, who was present at the US premiere, described in his first biography, The Sound Barrier was entertaining, but not that realistic – and any pilot who attempted to break the sound barrier in the manner portrayed in the film (forcing the centre stick forward to pull out of a dive) would have been killed. (Note: Control reversal, though applying in this context, is not a legitimate aerodynamic technique, it is caused by insufficient tailplane stiffness, the elevators acting as though they were trim tabs twisting the tailplane to produce an aerodynamic effect opposite to that intended.) Because the 1947 Bell X-1 flight had not been widely publicised, many who saw The Sound Barrier thought it was a true story and that the first supersonic flight was made by a British pilot.

Studio filming was completed at Shepperton Studios, but the flying sequences were filmed at Chilbolton Aerodrome, Nether Wallop, Hampshire, under the direction of Anthony Squire. A Vickers Valetta and Avro Lancaster bomber served as camera platforms for the aerial sequences. (Note: The film crew had a near-tragic episode on the Lancaster bomber as they suffered from hypoxia when their oxygen system failed.) With the assistance of the British Aircraft Constructors Association, aircraft featured in The Sound Barrier were loaned by Vickers, de Havilland and other British aerospace companies. Footage of early 1950s British jet technology used in the film includes scenes of the de Havilland Comet, the world's first jet passenger airliner, the Supermarine Attacker and the de Havilland Vampire. A Supermarine 535 prototype for the later Swift (VV119) featured as the experimental Prometheus jet fighter. Not unlike its screen persona, the Swift was an aircraft design that underwent particularly difficult teething problems during development. (Note: A list of the aircraft appearing in the film follows the opening credits.)

Malcolm Arnold (later knighted) composed the music score, for this, the first of his three films for David Lean. The others were Hobson's Choice (1954) and The Bridge on the River Kwai (1957).

== Reception ==
=== Critical ===
The Sound Barrier, in its American title as Breaking the Sound Barrier, was reviewed by Bosley Crowther in The New York Times. According to Crowther, "this picture, which was directed and produced in England by David Lean from an uncommonly literate and sensitive original script by Terence Rattigan, is a wonderfully beautiful and thrilling comprehension of the power of jet airplanes and of the minds and emotions of the people who are involved with these miraculous machines. And it is played with consummate revelation of subtle and profound characters by a cast headed by Ralph Richardson, Nigel Patrick, and Ann Todd".

Film historian Stephen Pendo further described the "brilliant aerial photography. ... Along with the conventional shot of the aircraft there is some unusual creative camera work. To illustrate the passage of a plane, Lean shows only the wheat in a field being bent by air currents produced by the unseen jet. ... Even the cockpit shots are very good, with the test pilots in G-suits and goggles framed by the plexiglass and sky backgrounds."

=== Box office ===
The Sound Barrier was the 12th most popular movie at the British box office in 1952 and also did well in the United States, making a comfortable profit.

=== Accolades ===
Award	Category	Nominee(s)	Result	Ref.
Academy Awards	Best Story and Screenplay	Terence Rattigan	Nominated	
Academy Awards	Best Sound Recording	London Films Sound Department	Won	
British Academy Film Awards	Best Film from any Source		Won	
British Academy Film Awards	Best British Film		Won	
British Academy Film Awards	Best British Actor	Nigel Patrick	Nominated	
British Academy Film Awards	Best British Actor	Ralph Richardson	Won	
British Academy Film Awards	Best British Actress	Ann Todd	Nominated	
National Board of Review Awards	Top Foreign Films		Won	
National Board of Review Awards	Best Foreign Film		Won	
National Board of Review Awards	Best Director	David Lean	Won	
National Board of Review Awards	Best Actor	Ralph Richardson	Won	
New York Film Critics Circle Awards	Best Film		Nominated	
New York Film Critics Circle Awards	Best Director	David Lean	Nominated	
New York Film Critics Circle Awards	Best Actor	Ralph Richardson	Won	

== Citations ==
=== Bibliography ===
- Brown, Eric. The Miles M.52: Gateway to Supersonic Flight. Stroud, Gloucestershire, UK: The History Press, 2012. ISBN 978-0-7524-7014-6.
- Brown, Eric. Wings on my Sleeve. London: Weidenfeld & Nicolson, 2006. ISBN 978-0-297-84565-2.
- Carlson, Mark. Flying on Film: A Century of Aviation in the Movies, 1912–2012. Duncan, Oklahoma: BearManor Media, 2012. ISBN 978-1-59393-219-0.
- Davies, R.E.G. and Philip J. Birtles. Comet: The World's First Jet Airliner. McLean, Virginia: Paladwr Press, 1999. ISBN 1-888962-14-3.
- de Havilland, Geoffrey. Sky Fever: The Autobiography of Sir Geoffrey De Havilland. Ramsbury, Marlborough, Wiltshire, UK: Crowood Press Ltd., 1999. ISBN 1-84037-148-X.
- Hamilton-Paterson, James. Empire of the Clouds: When Britain's Aircraft Ruled the World. London: Faber & Faber, 2010. ISBN 978-0-5712-4795-0.
- Hardwick, Jack and Ed Schnepf. "A Viewer's Guide to Aviation Movies." The Making of the Great Aviation Films. General Aviation Series, Volume 2, 1989.
- Kulik, Karol. Alexander Korda: The Man Who Could Work Miracles. London: Virgin, 1990. ISBN 978-0-86369-446-2.
- Paris, Michael. From the Wright Brothers to Top gun: Aviation, Nationalism, and Popular Cinema. Manchester, UK: Manchester University Press, 1995. ISBN 978-0-7190-4074-0.
- Pendo, Stephen. Aviation in the Cinema. Lanham, Maryland: Scarecrow Press, 1985. ISBN 0-8-1081-746-2.
- Porter, Vincent. "The Robert Clark Account." Historical Journal of Film, Radio and Television, Vol. 20 No. 4, 2000.
- Pratley, Gerald. The Cinema of David Lean. Aurora, Colorado: Oak Tree Publications, !974. ISBN 978-0-4980-1050-7.
- Winchester, Jim. The World's Worst Aircraft: From Pioneering Failures to Multimillion Dollar Disasters. London: Amber Books Ltd., 2005. ISBN 1-904687-34-2.
- Wood, Derek. Project Cancelled. Indianapolis: The Bobbs-Merrill Company Inc., 1975. ISBN 0-672-52166-0.
- Yeager, Chuck, Bob Cardenas, Bob Hoover, Jack Russell and James Young. The Quest for Mach One: A First-Person Account of Breaking the Sound Barrier. New York: Penguin Studio, 1997. ISBN 0-670-87460-4.
- Yeager, Chuck and Leo Janos. Yeager: An Autobiography. New York: Bantam Books, 1986. ISBN 0-553-25674-2.
