= Man Alive! (1952 film) =

1952 film

- Directed by: William T. Hurtz
- Written by: William Roberts; Bill Scott
- Produced by: Stephen Bosustow
- Music by: Benjamin Lees
- Production company: United Productions of America
- Distributed by: American Cancer Society
- Release date: 1952
- Country: United States
- Language: English

Man Alive! is a 1952 American animated short documentary film directed by William T. Hurtz.

== Accolades ==
It was nominated for an Academy Award for Best Documentary Short.

== Summary ==
A video of the short film.

In this animated cartoon, an analogy is made between a badly functioning car and a man with physical symptoms that could lead to neoplasm. Various stages of denial, unprofessional advice and quick fix remedies are shown (alongside the seven danger signals of cancer, recommendation of cancer therapies and debunked cancer myths). He finally goes to a good garage paying heavily to have it repaired, learning that he shouldn't make the same mistake with his body. He goes to the doctor for his indigestion (one of the symptoms of cancer).

== See also ==
- Cancer research
- Rooty Toot Toot - an UPA film also released in 1952
- Limited animation
