= The Homing Waltz =

1952 popular song

"The Homing Waltz" is a song that was written by Johnny Reine and Tommie Connor, and recorded by Vera Lynn in 1952. It charted at a peak position of number nine on the UK Singles Chart.

The song reached number one in the UK's sheet music chart in August 1952, where it stayed for nine weeks. It was replaced by Al Martino's "Here in My Heart", which became the inaugural number one on the first UK Singles Chart based on record sales, published on 14 November 1952. On this chart, "The Homing Waltz" was at number nine. Another contemporary recording available was by the up-and-coming young British singer Alma Cogan.
