= Just for You (1952 film) =

1952 film by Elliott Nugent

- Theatrical release poster
- Directed by: Elliott Nugent
- Written by: Robert Carson
- Produced by: Pat Duggan
- Starring: Bing Crosby; Jane Wyman
- Cinematography: George Barnes
- Edited by: Doane Harrison; Ellsworth Hoagland
- Music by: Emil Newman
- Production company: Paramount Pictures
- Distributed by: Paramount Pictures
- Release dates: August 8, 1952 (Atlantic City); October 8, 1952 (New York)
- Running time: 104 minutes
- Country: United States
- Language: English
- Box office: $2.9 million (U.S. rentals)

Just for You is a 1952 American musical film directed by Elliott Nugent and starring Bing Crosby and Jane Wyman.

== Plot ==
Widower Jordan Blake is a successful Broadway producer and songwriter, but he has been neglecting his teenaged children Jerry and Barbara. In rehearsal with star and girlfriend Carolina Hill, Jordan keeps Jerry waiting and then dismisses a song that Jerry has written as trite. Jordan is also unaware that Jerry is infatuated with Carolina. When Barbara's governess is arrested for a drunken disagreement with a police officer, Jordan realizes that he must spend more time with his children.

Jordan takes Jerry and Barbara to a resort near an exclusive finishing school that Barbara wants to attend. Jordan meets Alida De Bronkhart, unaware that she is the school's headmistress, and asks Alida how a girl can be accepted there. He also performs an old vaudeville song for the trustees, causing Barbara great embarrassment.

After Carolina engages Jerry in a personal conversation about love and her intention to marry, he mistakenly believes that he is the object of her affections. Heartbroken when he learns that Carolina is engaged to his father, Jerry enlists in the Air Force and leaves home.

In wartime, Jordan performs during a USO tour of Alaska. He speaks to the crowd about his perspective on raising children, unaware that his son is in the audience, but they eventually reunite.

== Cast ==
- Bing Crosby as Jordan Blake
- Jane Wyman as Carolina Hill
- Ethel Barrymore as Alida De Bronkhart
- Robert Arthur as Jerry Blake
- Natalie Wood as Barbara Blake
- Leon Tyler as David Mackenzie
- Cora Witherspoon as Mrs. Angevine
- Ben Lessy as Georgie Polanski
- Regis Toomey as Hodges
- Joel Marston as Harvey
- Willis Bouchey as Hank Rose
- Herbert Vigran as Chauffeur
- Art Smith as Leo

== Production ==
The film is based on the book Famous by Stephen Vincent Benét.

Director Elliott Nugent was offered the job by Pat Duggan, an old producer friend. Nugent was battling depression, later writing: "I was and still am grateful to the whole organization at Paramount for the good will and understanding help that I received on that picture. By the time shooting began, I had slipped back into one of my depressive periods and my self-confidence and power of decision was very low." Nugent said that Duggan, Paramount executive Don Hartman and Bing Crosby "soon realized that I was not at my best—and they did all they could to help me. I kept reminding myself that I had felt the same, or worse, directing The Great Gatsby—and still that picture had turned out very creditably. But the old pattern of suicidal thoughts returned to me too often for comfort, though I shook them off and forged ahead. I leaned on my associates a great deal."

Filming took place between October 22 and December 20, 1951. Location scenes were filmed at Lake Arrowhead near San Bernardino, California and at Big Bear Lake in the San Bernardino National Forest.

== Release ==
The film premiered at the Warner Theatre in Atlantic City, New Jersey on August 8, 1952.

== Reception ==
In a contemporary review for The New York Times, critic Bosley Crowther wrote: "Put this one down as an endeavor in a generous cause that fails to come off entirely because it lacks sharp direction—and a script. Elliott Nugent's staging and pacing is as rigid and uninspired as the stiff and conventional plotting in Mr. Carson's script. And the songs and song numbers, while pleasant, are nothing to set the screen on fire."

The Boston Globe called the film "a crashing bore" and wrote: "It is hard to believe that such a feeble script could have been fashioned from a story by the late Stephen Vincent Benet, one of our livelier short story writers. But it is plain, on the evidence, that Benet's 'Famous' has been badly mangled by scripter Robert Carson. Furthermore, Elliot Nugent, who usually can be counted upon for a clean and swiftly staged show, has come a cropper with 'Just for You.' It looks as though it had 'just happened,' without a directorial hand to guide its destinies."

== Soundtrack ==
The film's music was composed by Harry Warren, with lyrics by Leo Robin.

- "I'll Si-si Ya in Bahia": sung by Bing Crosby and chorus
- "The Live Oak Tree": sung by Bing Crosby and girls' chorus
- "Zing a Little Zong": sung by Bing Crosby and Jane Wyman
- "On the 10:10 from Ten-Ten-Tennessee": sung by Bing Crosby and Ben Lessy
- "Just for You": sung by Bing Crosby
- "He's Just Crazy for Me"
- "Call Me Tonight"" sung by Bob Arthur and Leon Tyler, and again by Bing Crosby
- "Checkin' My Heart": sung by Jane Wyman and chorus
- "The Maiden of Guadalupe": sung by Jane Wyman and chorus

"Spring Fever" and "A Flight of Fancy" were also written for the film and appear as background music.

"Zing a Little Zong" was nominated for Best Music (Song) at the 1953 Academy Awards.

Crosby recorded six of the songs for Decca Records, which were issued on a 10" LP titled Selections from the Paramount Picture "Just for You". “Zing a Little Zong” charted on the Billboard Honor Roll of Hits list for six weeks, peaking at #18. Crosby's songs were also included in the Bing's Hollywood album series.
