= Forget Me Not (Vera Lynn song) =

Original song written and composed by Johnny Reine, Bunny Lewis, William Sinclair

Song by Vera Lynn
- B-side: "What A Day We'll Have"
- Label: London Recordings
- Songwriter(s): Johnny Reine, Bunny Lewis, William Sinclair

"Forget Me Not" is a song that was recorded by Vera Lynn in 1952. It peaked at number five on the UK Singles Chart.
