= Comes A-Long A-Love =

1952 single by Kay Starr

Single by Kay Starr with Orchestra Conducted by Harold Mooney
- B-side: "Three Letters"
- Published: June 9, 1952
- Released: September 8, 1952
- Recorded: August 19, 1952
- Genre: Traditional pop
- Length: 2:25
- Label: Capitol Records
- Songwriter: Al Sherman

"Comes A-Long A-Love" was a hit single for American singer Kay Starr. The song was released in 1952 and was written by the former Tin Pan Alley songwriter Al Sherman. The melody was adapted from the final part of the overture to Gioachino Rossini's opera Semiramide. "Comes A-Long A-Love" was the last hit song Sherman would write, before handing the reins over to his sons, Bob and Dick Sherman, who were just beginning their songwriting careers. The song was first published on June 9, 1952.

== Kay Starr version ==
The hit recording by Kay Starr, with orchestra conducted by Harold Mooney, was made for Capitol on August 19, 1952. In 1963, Starr recorded it again for The Fabulous Favorites, a stereo album of her greatest hits, which was released by Capitol on June 1, 1964.

== Chart performance ==
On September 27, 1952, Starr's version of "Comes A-Long A-Love" charted on the Billboard Best Selling Pop Singles chart, where it reached No. 9. Outside, the US, the track also topped the then fledgling UK Singles Chart in January 1953 for a week, becoming only the third chart topper in that listing. The song was the first singles chart No. 1 not to also reach that position on the UK's sheet music charts. It entered that listing on December 20, 1952, and peaked at No. 6. Starr's recording was the first version to be issued in the UK, in October 1952, and the only other recordings of the song available in the UK besides hers were by British acts: The Tanner Sisters and Harry Farmer (Hammond organ). Starr's was the only rendition to make the UK singles sales chart, first appearing on the December 5, 1952 listing and peaking at No. 1 in its eighth week on chart.

== In popular culture ==
- The song has appeared on the soundtracks of several films, including the 2006 release Confetti.

== See also ==
- List of number-one singles from the 1950s (UK)

== Bibliography ==
- Sherman, Robert B. Walt's Time: from before to beyond, Santa Clarita: Camphor Tree Publishers, 1998. ISBN 0-9646059-3-7
