= Zing a Little Zong =

Song

Song
- Written: Harry Warren
- Published: 1952
- Lyricist: Leo Robin

"Zing a Little Zong" is a popular song written by Harry Warren, the lyrics by Leo Robin. The song was published in 1952 and written for the 1952 movie Just for You where it was performed by Bing Crosby and Jane Wyman. It was nominated for the Academy Award for Best Original Song of 1952 but lost out to "High Noon".
The Decca record by Crosby and Wyman was cut on May 8, 1952 and was in the Billboard charts for six weeks with a peak position of #18.

The Billboard review of "Zing" was enthusiastic. "Bing Crosby and Jane Wyman team up for a sock waxing of this cute novelty ditty from their flick “Just for You”. Bing sounds more relaxed than he has in a long time and the thrush carries her part in fine fashion. The Jud Conlon Rhythmaires help out spiritedly. Side should get a lot of plays and spins due to impact of movie."

Leo Robin wrote an opening verse, which was not used in the film or the commercial recording, but does help to set the scene and explain the use of the last letter of the alphabet:

Let's imagine we’re in Holland and we’re underneath the moon,
Let's walk a little, talk a little, kiss a little,
Cling a little, sigh a little, sing a little tune…

Crosby also performed the song with his White Christmas co-star Rosemary Clooney. Helen O'Connell was another who recorded the song in 1952.

Versions of "Zing a Little Zong" have been featured on the soundtracks for several subsequent films, such as Brooklyn and Final Score.
