= Here in My Heart =

1952 single by Al Martino

- A-side label of the US vinyl single

Single by Al Martino Orchestra under the direction of Monty Kelly
- B-side: "I Cried Myself to Sleep"
- Published: May 1, 1952
- Released: April 1952
- Recorded: April 17, 1952
- Genre: Traditional pop, easy listening
- Length: 3:15
- Label: BBS
- Songwriters: Pat Genaro, Lou Levinson, and Bill Borrelli
- Producer: Voyle Gilmore

Al Martino singles chronology
"Here in My Heart" (1952)	"Take My Heart" (1952)

"Here in My Heart" is a popular song written by Pat Genaro, Lou Levinson, and Bill Borrelli, first published in 1952.

A recording of the song by Italian-American singer Al Martino made history as the first number one hit on the UK singles chart, on November 14, 1952. "Here in My Heart" also reached the number one spot in America.

== Background ==
Martino's recording, made on April 17, 1952, was first issued on the small BBS label (based in Martino's native Philadelphia) in America, and on Capitol in the UK. It was produced by Voyle Gilmore, with orchestra under the direction of Monty Kelly.

"Here in My Heart" remained in the top position for nine weeks in the United Kingdom, setting a record for the longest consecutive run at number one, a record which, over 50 years on, has only been beaten by eight other tracks - Bryan Adams's "(Everything I Do) I Do It for You" (16 weeks), the Wet Wet Wet version of The Troggs' "Love Is All Around" (15 weeks), Drake's "One Dance" (15 weeks), David Whitfield's "Cara Mia" (10 weeks), Rihanna's "Umbrella" (10 weeks), Whitney Houston's version of Dolly Parton's "I Will Always Love You" (10 weeks), Slim Whitman's "Rose Marie" (11 weeks) and Tones and I's "Dance Monkey" (11 weeks). Frankie Laine's "I Believe" spent a total of 18 weeks at number one, but not consecutively, instead totalling those weeks across several runs at the top.

The single was Martino's only UK number one hit. His subsequent releases failed to reach the top of the chart, and his final UK chart appearance was in 1973, when a reissue of "Spanish Eyes" reached the top five.

Martino rerecorded the song in an unsuccessful rockaballad version for MGM's Cub label, released in 1958. In 1961, he again re-recorded the song, with it reaching number 86 on the Billboard Top 100 chart (and the top 20 on the Easy Listening survey).

== Other contemporary recordings ==
Prior to Martino's recording reaching number one on the UK Singles Chart, the song had already become a number one hit on the UK's sheet music sales chart. It spent eight weeks at the top of this chart, beginning on October 25, 1952. The song had first charted on September 6, with Martino's recording, issued in July, being the first one available in the UK. Subsequent cover versions available in the UK were mostly recorded by British artists: Issy Bonn (with Eddie Calvert on trumpet), Larry Day, Dennis Lotis, David Hughes, Victor Silvester and his Ballroom Orchestra, Lee Lawrence, Eve Boswell and Harry Secombe. The only other American recording available in the UK was by Dick Haymes and the Andrews Sisters.

Larry Day's version (with orchestra conducted by Frank Cordell) was made in London on June 24, 1952. It was released by EMI on the His Master's Voice label (catalog number B 10323). Semprini (piano with rhythm accompaniment) recorded it as the first song of the medley "Dancing to the Piano (No. 18) - Part 1" along with "Half as Much" and "Isle of Innisfree" in London on November 11, 1952. It was released by EMI on the His Master's Voice label (catalog number B 10394).

Other contemporary versions were also recorded by Vic Damone and Tony Bennett. A rhythm and blues version was also recorded that year, by Wini Brown and her Boy Friends. Mario Lanza, at the height of his popularity in the early 1950s, had also planned to record this song, but changed his mind when asked not to by Martino, so his recording would not be overlooked.

== Later use ==
In 1963, actor Richard Harris performed "Here in My Heart" in the film This Sporting Life, although he would not release his first album, A Tramp Shining, until four years later, following the success of the 1967 film Camelot.

== See also ==
- List of number-one singles in Australia during the 1950s
- List of number-one singles of 1952 (U.S.)
- List of number-one singles from the 1950s
- List of Christmas number one singles (UK)
