= The Ballad of High Noon =

Song composed by Dimitri Tiomkin performed by Tex Ritter

Song by Tex Ritter
- Published: 1952
- Composer: Dimitri Tiomkin
- Lyricist: Ned Washington

"The Ballad of High Noon" (also known simply as "High Noon", or by its opening lyric and better known title, "Do Not Forsake Me, Oh My Darlin'") is a popular song published in 1952, with music by Dimitri Tiomkin and lyrics by Ned Washington.

It is the theme song of the 1952 multiple Academy Award-winning movie High Noon (and titled onscreen as such in the film's opening credits as sung by popular country music singer and actor Tex Ritter), with its tune repeated throughout the film. It was awarded the 1952 Academy Award for Best Original Song, and was performed that night for the Academy by Ritter. There were only three instruments accompanying Ritter on the soundtrack: guitar, accordion, and the Hammond Novachord, the first electronic synthesizer, which created an unusual gourd-like percussion background.

The song appears at No. 25 on "AFI's 100 Years...100 Songs". Members of the Western Writers of America chose it as one of the Top 100 Western songs of all time. In 2021 it featured in Kenneth Branagh's memory film Belfast. In 2023, it was included on the soundtrack of the film Asteroid City by Wes Anderson.

== Other versions ==
- Frankie Laine (1952) – US No. 5; UK No. 7
- Tex Ritter (1952) – US No. 12
- Fred Waring & His Pennsylvanians (1952)
- Eddie Fisher with Alex Stordahl Orchestra & Chorus (1955)
- Jimmie Rodgers (1959)
- Johnny Bond (1961)
- Connie Francis (1961)
- Sons of the Pioneers (1962)
- Duane Eddy (1962) A guitar with orchestra instrumental interpretation.
- Faron Young (1963)
- Walter Brennan (1964)
