= List of awards and nominations received by David Lean =

David Lean awards and nominations
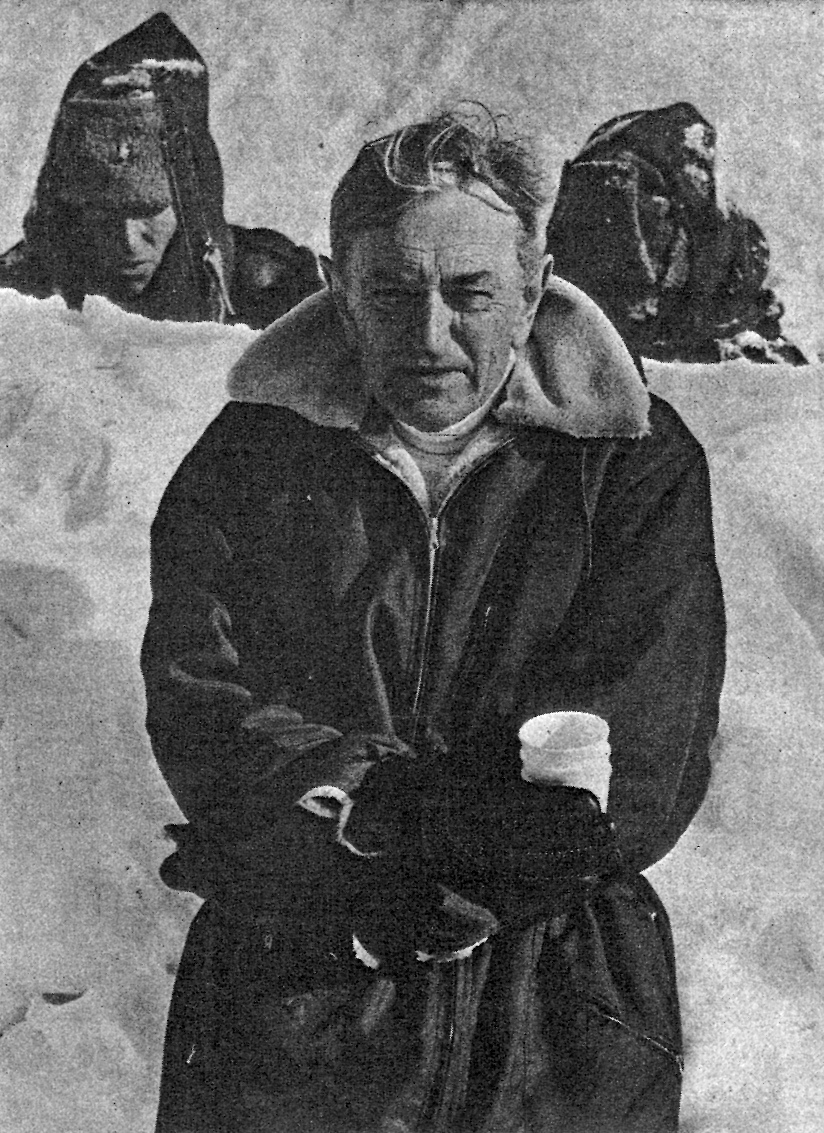
Awards and nominations
Award	Wins	Nominations
Golden Globe	3	5
Academy Awards	2	11
BAFTA Awards	6	14

David Lean was an English film director, producer, screenwriter and editor.

Widely considered one of the most influential directors of all time, Lean directed the large-scale epics The Bridge on the River Kwai (1957), Lawrence of Arabia (1962), Doctor Zhivago (1965), and A Passage to India (1984). He also directed two adaptations of Charles Dickens novels, Great Expectations (1946) and Oliver Twist (1948), as well as the romantic drama Brief Encounter (1945).

He received various awards including eleven Academy Awards nominations winning twice for Best Director for Bridge on the River Kwai (1957) and Lawrence of Arabia (1962). He also received five Golden Globe Award nominations winning three awards for Best Director for The Bridge on the River Kwai (1957), Lawrence of Arabia (1962), and Doctor Zhivago (1964). He also received fourteen British Academy Film Award nominations winning six awards. In 1974 he won the BAFTA Fellowship for Outstanding British Contribution in Film.

== Major associations ==
=== Academy Award ===
Year	Category	Nominated work	Result	Ref.
1946	Best Director	Brief Encounter	Nominated	
1946	Best Adapted Screenplay	Brief Encounter	Nominated	
1947	Best Director	Great Expectations	Nominated	
1947	Best Adapted Screenplay	Great Expectations	Nominated	
1955	Best Director	Summertime	Nominated	
1957	Best Director	The Bridge on the River Kwai	Won	
1962	Best Director	Lawrence of Arabia	Won	
1965	Best Director	Doctor Zhivago	Nominated	
1984	Best Director	A Passage to India	Nominated	
1984	Best Adapted Screenplay	A Passage to India	Nominated	
1984	Best Film Editing	A Passage to India	Nominated	

=== British Academy Film Awards ===
Year	Category	Nominated work	Result	Ref.
1948	Best British Film	Oliver Twist	Nominated	
1952	Best Film from any Source	The Sound Barrier	Won	
1952	Best British Film	The Sound Barrier	Won	
1954	Best Film from any Source	Hobson's Choice	Nominated	
1954	Best British Screenplay	Hobson's Choice	Nominated	
1955	Best Film from any Source	Summertime	Nominated	
1957	Best Film from any Source	The Bridge on the River Kwai	Won	
1957	Best British Film	The Bridge on the River Kwai	Won	
1962	Best Film from any Source	Lawrence of Arabia	Won	
1962	Best British Film	Lawrence of Arabia	Won	
1965	Best Film from any Source	Doctor Zhivago	Nominated	
1970	Best Direction	Ryan's Daughter	Nominated	
1975	BAFTA Fellowship		Received	
1984	Best Film	A Passage to India	Nominated	
1984	Best Adapted Screenplay	A Passage to India	Nominated	

=== Golden Globe Awards ===
Year	Category	Nominated work	Result	Ref.
1957	Best Director	The Bridge on the River Kwai	Won	
1962	Best Director	Lawrence of Arabia	Won	
1965	Best Director	Doctor Zhivago	Won	
1984	Best Director	A Passage to India	Nominated	
1984	Best Screenplay	A Passage to India	Nominated	

== Miscellaneous awards ==
Year	Award	Film	Result
1944	Silver Condor Award for Best Foreign Film	In Which We Serve (shared with Noël Coward)	Won
1954	Berlin International Film Festival Golden Bear	Hobson's Choice	Won
1946	Cannes Film Festival Grand Prix	Brief Encounter	Won
1949	Cannes Film Festival Grand Prix	The Passionate Friends	Nominated
1966	Cannes Film Festival Palme d'Or	Doctor Zhivago	Nominated
1967	David di Donatello for Best Foreign Director	Doctor Zhivago	Won
1958	Directors Guild of America Award for Outstanding Directing - Feature Film	The Bridge on the River Kwai	Won
1963	Directors Guild of America Award for Outstanding Directing - Feature Film	Lawrence of Arabia	Won
1971	Directors Guild of America Award for Outstanding Directing - Feature Film	Ryan's Daughter	Nominated
1985	Directors Guild of America Award for Outstanding Directing - Feature Film	A Passage to India	Nominated
1974	Evening Standard British Film Award for Best Film	Ryan's Daughter	Won
1946	Hugo Award for Best Dramatic Presentation	Blithe Spirit	Won
1964	Nastro d'Argento for Best Foreign Director	Lawrence of Arabia	Won
1984	Kansas City Film Critics Circle Award for Best Director	A Passage to India	Won
1964	Kinema Junpo Award for Best Foreign Language Film	Lawrence of Arabia	Won
1952	National Board of Review Award for Best Director	The Sound Barrier	Won
1957	National Board of Review Award for Best Director	The Bridge on the River Kwai	Won
1962	National Board of Review Award for Best Director	Lawrence of Arabia	Won
1984	National Board of Review Award for Best Director	A Passage to India	Won
1985	National Society of Film Critics Award for Best Director	A Passage to India	3rd place
1942	New York Film Critics Circle Award for Best Director	In Which We Serve	2nd place
1953	New York Film Critics Circle Award for Best Director	The Sound Barrier	3rd place
1955	New York Film Critics Circle Award for Best Director	Summertime	Won
1957	New York Film Critics Circle Award for Best Director	The Bridge on the River Kwai	Won
1965	New York Film Critics Circle Award for Best Director	Doctor Zhivago	2nd place
1984	New York Film Critics Circle Award for Best Director	A Passage to India	Won
1948	Venice Film Festival Grand International Award	Oliver Twist	Nominated
1984	Writers Guild of America Award for Best Adapted Screenplay	A Passage to India	Nominated
