= Passionate Friends =

Passionate Friends may refer to:

- The Passionate Friends: A Novel, a 1913 story by H. G. Wells
  - The Passionate Friends (1922 film), a British film directed by Maurice Elvey, based on the novel
  - The Passionate Friends (1949 film), a British film directed by David Lean, also based on the novel
