= The Passionate Friends (1922 film) =

1922 film

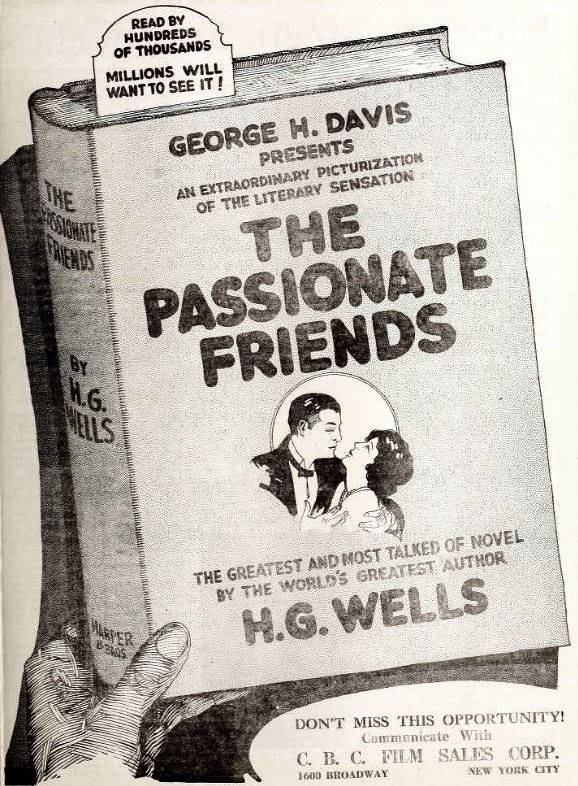
- American advertisement
- Directed by: Maurice Elvey
- Written by: Leslie Howard Gordon
- Based on: The Passionate Friends; 1913 novel by H.G. Wells
- Starring: Milton Rosmer; Valia; Fred Raynham
- Cinematography: John J. Cox
- Production company: Stoll Pictures
- Distributed by: Stoll Pictures
- Release date: January 1922
- Running time: 90 min. (U.S. edition)
- Country: United Kingdom
- Language: Silent (English intertitles)

The Passionate Friends is a 1922 British romantic drama film directed by Maurice Elvey and starring Milton Rosmer, Valia, and Fred Raynham. It is based on H. G. Wells' The Passionate Friends: A Novel (1913), which was adapted again by David Lean for his 1949 film The Passionate Friends.

== Cast ==
- Milton Rosmer as Steven Stratton
- Valia as Lady Mary Christian
- Fred Raynham as Harrison Justin
- Madge Stuart as Rachel Moore
- Lawford Davidson as Guy Ladislaw
- Ralph Forster as Philip Evesham
- Teddy Arundell as Edward Stratton
- Annie Esmond as Maid

== Production ==
The Passionate Friends was part of the Stoll Pictures' "Eminent Authors" series of films. Although based upon Wells' 1913 social realist novel, it largely avoided any of Wells' radical social commentary regarding the United Kingdom.
