= The Time of the Cuckoo =

Play by US playwright Arthur Laurents

The Time of the Cuckoo is a play by American playwright Arthur Laurents. It focuses on the bittersweet romance between Leona Samish, a single American executive secretary vacationing in Europe and Renato Di Rossi, a shopkeeper she meets in Venice. Di Rossi, trapped in a loveless marriage, relentlessly pursues Leona, who initially is shocked by the thought of an illicit affair but eventually succumbs to the Italian's charms.

The Broadway production was directed by Harold Clurman. The play opened at the Empire Theater on October 15, 1952, and closed on May 30, 1953, after 263 performances. The theatre was demolished shortly after the play closed.

The play was adapted for the screen under the title Summertime (starring Katharine Hepburn and Rossano Brazzi) and titled in Great Britain as Summer Madness in 1955, directed by British director David Lean (Lawrence of Arabia, Doctor Zhivago). In 1965, it was adapted into the Broadway musical Do I Hear a Waltz? with a book by Laurents, music by Richard Rodgers and lyrics by Stephen Sondheim.

== Opening night cast ==
- Shirley Booth as Leona Samish
- Geraldine Brooks as June Yaeger
- Dino Di Luca as Renato Di Rossi
- Donald Murphy as Eddie Yaeger
- Lydia St. Clair as Signora Fiora
- Silva Gaselli as Giovanna
- Jose Perez as Mauro
- Daniel Reed as Mr. McIlhenny
- Ruggero Romor as Vito
- Jane Rose as Mrs. McIlhenny (only cast member to appear in Summertime)

Bethel Leslie replaced Geraldine Brooks and Keith Green replaced Jose Perez later in the off-Broadway revival.

John Serry, Sr. performed as the concert accordionist and soloist in the orchestra.

== Principal production credits ==
- Producers: Robert Whitehead, Walter Fried
- Scenic Design: Ben Edwards
- Lighting Design: Ben Edwards
- Costume Design: Helene Pons

== Awards ==
Shirley Booth won the Tony Award for Best Performance by a Leading Actress in a Play.

== Off-Broadway revivals ==
The York Theatre Company in Manhattan mounted a production of the play for 16 performances in early 1986. Stuart Howard directed a cast that included Michael Learned, George Guidall, and Debra Jo Rupp.

In 2000, the play was revived for a limited run from January 27 to May 7 at the Mitzi E. Newhouse Theater located in Lincoln Center. The production, with a revised script by Laurents, was directed by Nicholas Martin. The cast included Debra Monk (who won an Obie Award for her performance), Olek Krupa, Tom Aldredge, and Polly Holliday. Theoni V. Aldredge designed the costumes.

In February 2011, the play was revived for a limited run at the Tap House Grill Theatre in downtown Oswego, Illinois by The Oswego Playhouse. The cast included Beth Goncher, Jill Orr, Steve Fiorito, Brent Miller, Lynn Meredith, Kelly Cash, Brandon Miller, Cole Perkins, Jim Stott and Sharon Pagoria. The production was directed by Daina Gielser.
