= Norman Spencer (producer) =

British film producer, screenwriter and production manager (1914–2024)

- Born: Norman Leslie Spencer; 13 August 1914; Stockwell, London, England
- Died: 16 August 2024 (aged 110 years, 3 days); Wimbledon, London, England
- Occupations: Film producer, screenwriter, production manager
- Years active: 1933–1987
- Employers: Cineguild Productions; Denham Film Studios
- Spouse: Barbara Sheppard (m. 1943; died 1998)
- Children: 2, including Sally-Jane

Norman Leslie Spencer (13 August 1914 – 16 August 2024) was a British film producer, production manager, screenwriter, and supercentenarian. He collaborated with director David Lean during the 1940s and '50s.

== Early life ==
Spencer was born in Stockwell, London, on 13 August 1914, and grew up in Billericay and Leigh-on-Sea, Essex. When he was fourteen, he started working as a painter, first on film posters, and later murals.

== Career ==
Spencer began in the film industry at age nineteen, initially doing extra work. He first met David Lean when he was a gofer at Denham Film Studios and Lean was an editor. His first job on a Lean film was as assistant director on Lean's debut as a director, In Which We Serve (1942).

Spencer became Lean's production manager after joining Cineguild Productions in 1944 and went on to work on Lean's adaptation of the Charles Dickens novel, Great Expectations (1946), and later co-scripted and co-produced Lean's film of Harold Brighouse's play Hobson's Choice (1954). Lean's first casting suggestion for the lead role was Welsh-born Roger Livesey, but Spencer convinced him to cast Charles Laughton instead, later explaining: "Laughton was a Yorkshireman and he would be playing a Lancastrian, so you'd get regional accuracy, more or less, with international casting. And I thought it needed that size of character." Spencer's last producing credit for Lean was Summertime (1955), which, according to Spencer, Lean was asked to direct by producer Alexander Korda. Spencer later collaborated with Lean on a re-write of the script for The Bridge on the River Kwai (1957) leading up to the film's production, after Lean was unhappy with the one Carl Foreman had written. Foreman was later asked to re-write the script by the film's producer Sam Spiegel. Spencer worked again for Lean on the Moroccan shoot for Lawrence of Arabia (1962), although his work was uncredited.

His later producing credits include the American action film Vanishing Point (1971) and Richard Attenborough's film Cry Freedom (1987).

In July 2013, Spencer attended a special screening of Great Expectations (1946) at Wolterton Hall, Norfolk.

== Personal life and death ==
In 1943, Spencer married Barbara Sheppard, and they were together until her death in 1998; they had two children, one of whom is the actress Sally-Jane Spencer.

In 2009 Spencer was living in Denham, Buckinghamshire.

Spencer died in Wimbledon, London, on 16 August 2024, three days after turning 110. At the time of his death, he was reported to have been the second-oldest man in the country.
