= Madeleine Smith =

Scottish alleged murderer (1835–1928)

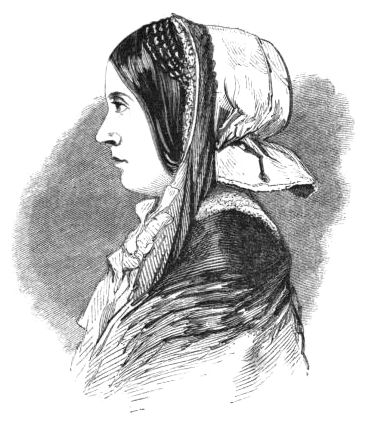
- Born: 29 March 1835; Glasgow, Scotland
- Died: 12 April 1928 (aged 93); New York City
- Known for: Being found not proven in a sensational murder trial
- Parent: James Smith (father)
- Relatives: David Hamilton (maternal grandfather)

- Photograph
- Madeleine Smith, at the time of her trial

Madeleine Hamilton Smith (29 March 1835 – 12 April 1928) was a Scottish woman who was accused of murdering her lover with arsenic in a sensational murder trial in Scotland in 1857. Defended by John Inglis, she was not convicted of murder. Her story was dramatised in the 1950 film Madeleine.

== Background ==
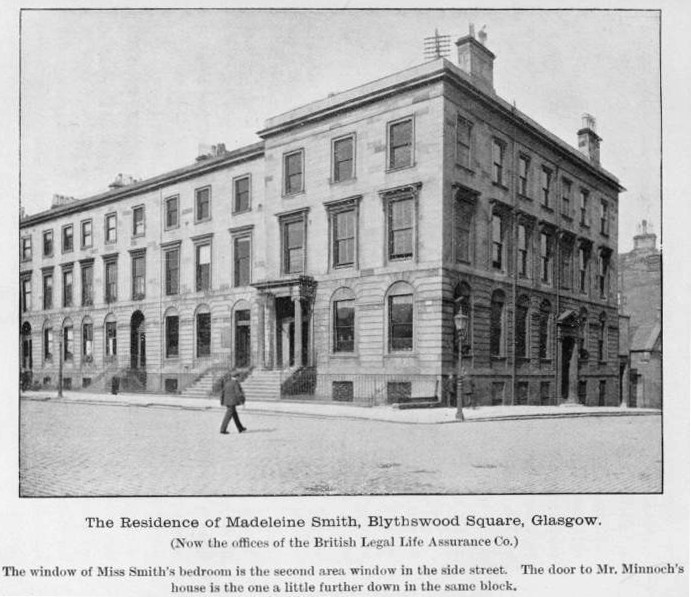
The building where Smith and her fiancé Minnoch each had apartments.

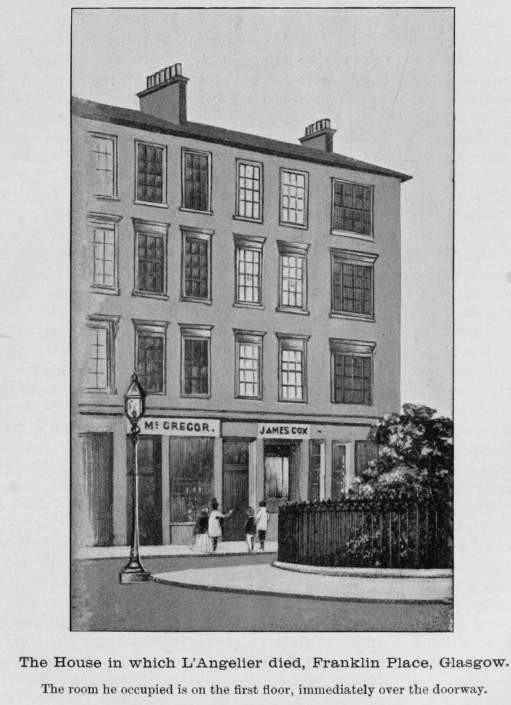
L'Angelier's rooming house

Smith was the first child (of five) of an upper-middle-class family in Glasgow; her father, James Smith, was a wealthy architect, and her mother, Elizabeth, was the daughter of leading neo-classical architect David Hamilton. She was born at the family home 81 Wellington Place in Glasgow.

In 1855 the family moved from India Street to 7 Blythswood Square, Glasgow, living in the lower half of a house owned by her maternal uncle, David Hamilton, a yarn merchant. The house stands at the crown of the major development led by William Harley on Blythswood Hill, and they also had a country property, "Rowaleyn", near Helensburgh.

Smith broke the strict Victorian conventions of the time when, as a young woman in early 1855, she began a secret love affair with Pierre Emile L'Angelier, some ten years her senior, an apprentice nurseryman who originally came from the Channel Islands. He worked as a packing clerk in a warehouse at 10 Bothwell Street nearby.

The pair would meet late at night, at Smith's bedroom window and also engaged in voluminous correspondence. During one of their infrequent meetings alone, she lost her virginity to L'Angelier.

Smith's parents, unaware of the affair with L'Angelier (whom Smith had promised to marry), found a suitable fiancé for her within the Glasgow upper-middle class, William Harper Minnoch.

Smith attempted to break her connection with L'Angelier and, in February 1857, asked him to return the letters she had written to him. Instead, L'Angelier threatened to use the letters to expose her and force her to marry him. She was soon observed in a druggist's office, ordering arsenic, which she signed for as M. H. Smith.

Early on the morning of 23 March 1857, L'Angelier died from arsenic poisoning. He is buried in the Ramshorn Cemetery on Ingram Street in Glasgow.

After his death, Smith's numerous letters were found in the house where he lodged, and she was arrested and charged with his murder.

== Trial ==
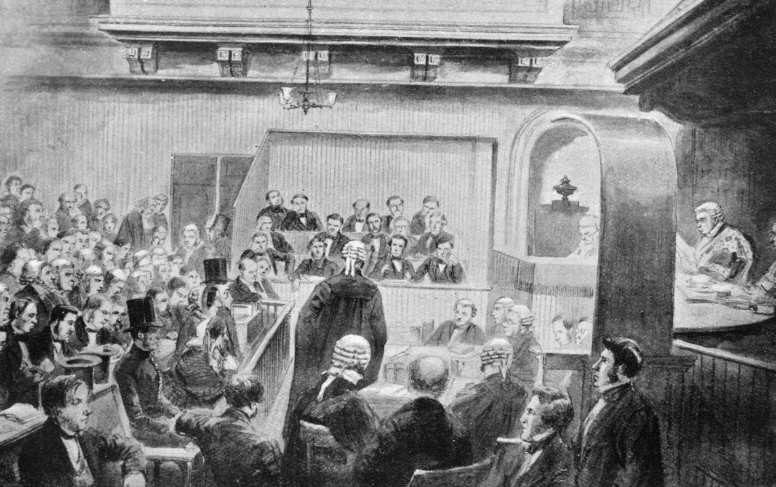
A sketch of the trial proceedings against Smith

At trial, Smith was defended by advocate John Inglis, the future Lord Glencorse. Toxicological evidence, confirming that the victim had died of arsenic poisoning, was given by Andrew Douglas Maclagan.

In the trial the two most positive elements in her defence were the two druggists both testifying that they coloured their arsenic to avoid accident (and the autopsy having not found this), and L'Angelier's valet testifying that L'Angelier had considered suicide at least once. There was therefore a strong suggestion of suicide.

Although the circumstantial evidence pointed towards her guilt (Smith had made purchases of arsenic in the weeks leading up to L'Angelier's death, and had a clear motive) the jury returned one verdict of not guilty on the first count (of administering poison on the first occasion of L'Angelier being ill) and a verdict of "not proven" on the second count, the murder. "Not proven" was a verdict unique to Scotland - although it carried an implication of guilt, it acknowledged that Madeleine could not be unambiguously convicted.

Crucial to the case was the chronology of certain letters from Smith to L'Angelier, and as the letters themselves were undated, the case hinged to some extent on the envelopes. One letter in particular depended on the correct interpretation of the date of the postmark, which was unfortunately illegible, and attracted some caustic comments from the judge; but the vast majority of these postmarks were quite clearly struck. When the police searched L'Angelier's room, many of Smith's letters were found without their envelopes and were then hurriedly collected and stuck into whichever envelopes came to hand.

According to Edinburgh Live in 2022, "It was the trial of the century and the newspapers had found a goldmine. Madeleine was pretty, well-connected and young, and the letters that then became the crucial piece of evidence were steamy to say the least."

== Later life ==
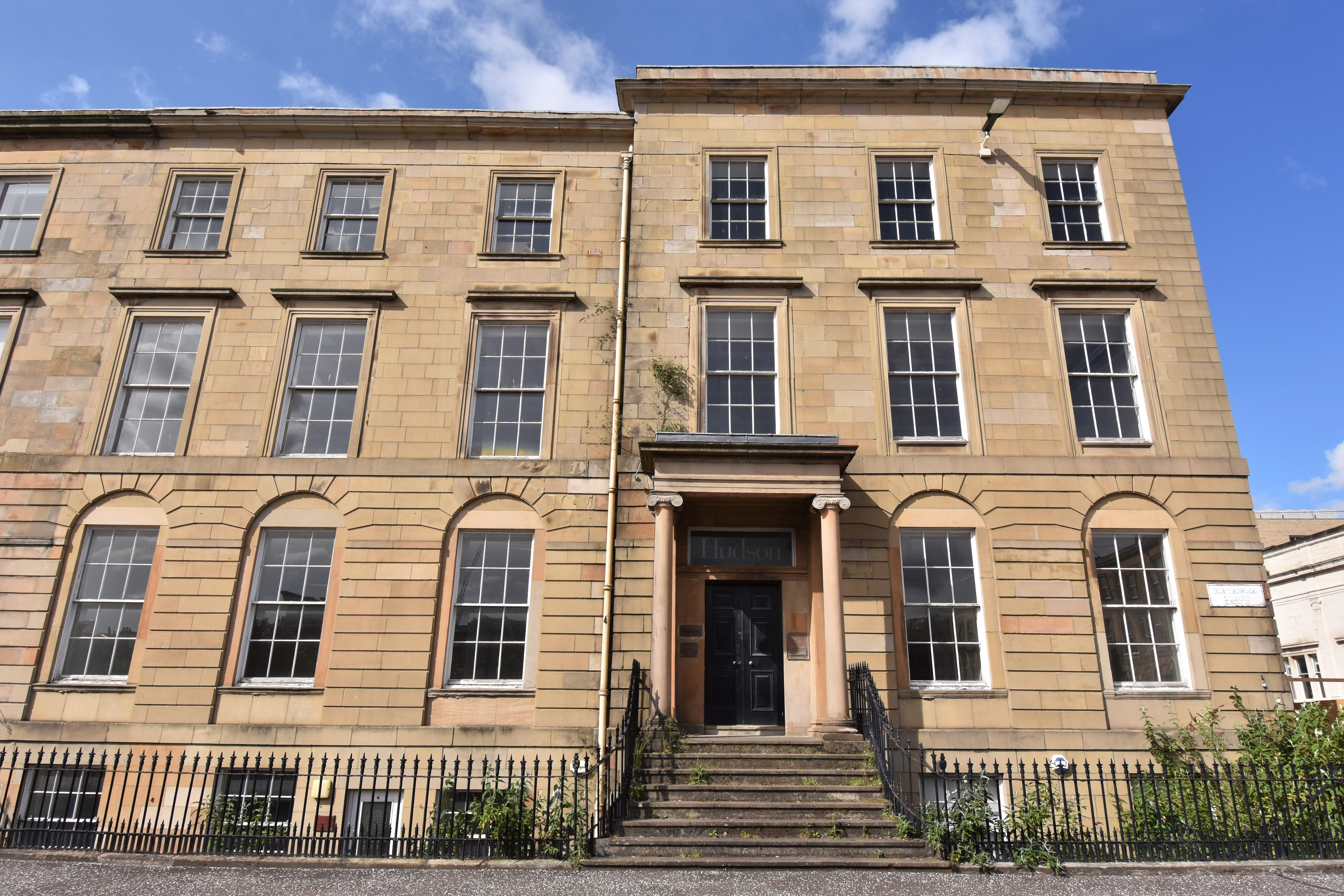
6-7 Blythswood Square. Madeleine Smith's apartment house. 2020.

Following the scandal her family were forced to quit their Glasgow home and their country villa Rowaleyn in Rhu and moved to Bridge of Allan in central Scotland. They moved again in 1860 to Old Polmont. Her father died in Polmont in 1863 aged 55, broken by the whole affair.

On 4 July 1861, she married George Wardle, a London artist and later, William Morris's business manager. They had one son (Thomas, born 1864) and one daughter (Mary, called "Kitten", born 1863). She became a Socialist, started the fashion of using mats on the dinner table instead of a tablecloth, and numbered among her acquaintances the young George Bernard Shaw. For a time, she became involved with the Fabian Society in London, and was an enthusiastic organiser. Because she was known by her new married name, few people knew who she was.

After many years of marriage, she and her husband separated in 1889 and Madeleine moved to New York City. Around 1916, then 75, she married 49-year-old William A. Sheehy and this marriage lasted until his death in 1926.

She was buried in New York at Mount Hope Cemetery in Hastings-on-Hudson on 19 April 1928.

== Later theories ==
Scholars and amateur criminologists have spent decades going over the details of the case. Most modern scholars believe that Smith committed the crime and the only thing that saved her from a guilty verdict and a death sentence was that no eyewitness could prove that Smith and L'Angelier had met in the weeks before his death.

After the trial, The Scotsman ran a small article stating that a witness had come forward claiming that a young male and female were seen outside Smith's house on the night of L'Angelier's death. However, the trial was already in progress, and the witness could not be questioned during it.

== Dramatisations ==
Smith's story was the basis for several plays and the David Lean film Madeleine (1950), starring Ann Todd, Ivan Desny and Leslie Banks. Todd had previously played Smith in the 1944 West End play The Rest Is Silence by Harold Purcell. A television play based upon the case, Killer in Close-Up: The Trial of Madeleine Smith, written by George F. Kerr, was also produced by Sydney television station ABN-2, broadcast on 13 August 1958. Jack House's book Square Mile of Murder (1961), which contains a section on Smith, formed the basis for a BBC television version in 1980. In the Granada Television series Lady Killers, Smith was played by Elizabeth Richardson. In 1996, the fifth series of In Suspicious Circumstances had an episode titled Dearest Pet that was a dramatisation of the Smith case. Geraldine O'Rawe played Smith.

The case was an inspiration for Wilkie Collins' novel The Law and the Lady (1875), though the only main similar features were the problem of the Scottish "Not Proven" verdict and arsenic poisoning as a means for murder.

Katharine Cornell portrayed Smith in the play Dishonored Lady. TCM gives the date of the play as 1928; the Internet Broadway Database has it opening on Broadway in 1930. In the early 1930s, MGM starred Joan Crawford, Nils Asther and Robert Montgomery in a film called Letty Lynton, which was based on a 1931 novel of the same title by Marie Adelaide Belloc Lowndes. This film closely follows Madeleine's story, except that Crawford's character is never charged and, in an example of pre-code Hollywood, gets away with murder. The film was not available due to a suit filed shortly after the film's release in 1932. The suit successfully claimed that the film script bears too close a resemblance to the script of the play, Dishonored Lady. On 1 May 2026, a restored print of Crawford's Letty Lynton received its first legal showing in 94 years as part of the 2026 TCM Classic Film Festival. In 1947, the play was adapted into a film of the same name starring Hedy Lamarr.

The case was again dramatised in 1952 for Mutual Radio in an episode of The Black Museum titled "The Small White Boxes".

Other novels based on the case include The House in Queen Anne's Square (1920) by William Darling Lyell, Lovers All Untrue (1970) by Norah Lofts, and Alas, for Her That Met Me! (1976) by Mary Ann Ashe (pseudonym of Christianna Brand). Alanna Knight's Murder in Paradise (2008) includes Smith, William Morris and George Wardle as peripheral characters, including a story of how Madeleine met George.

From 1976 to 1989 Smith was one of the figures in the Chamber of Horrors section in the Edinburgh Wax Museum on the Royal Mile.

The Madeleine Smith case was documented and partly dramatised, with actors reading her letters and a draft of a letter by Pierre Emile L'Angelier, on an episode of the 2022 BBC Radio podcast series Lady Killers with Lucy Worsley.

A one-act musical based on the Madeleine Smith case, The Glasgow Poisoner, was staged at A Play, A Pie and A Pint (Glasgow) in September 2025 and the play was published by Salamander Street.

== Sources ==
- Campbell, Jimmy Powdrell. Rewriting The Madeleine Smith Story. 2007 ISBN 978-0-7524-4008-8
- Diamond, Michael (2003) Victorian Sensation London: Anthem. ISBN 1-84331-150-X. pp. 172–176
- MacGowan, Douglas. The Strange Affair of Madeleine Smith: Victorian Scotland's Trial of the Century. (Mercat Press, 2007). ISBN 1-84183-113-1.
- MacGowan, Douglas. Murder in Victorian Scotland: The Trial of Madeleine Smith. (1999) ISBN 0-275-96431-0
- House, Jack (1961) Square Mile of Murder. Edinburgh: W. & R. Chambers
- Mackay, James. Scotland's Post (2000) Glasgow
