= Cineguild Productions =

Production company

Cineguild Productions was a production company formed by director David Lean, cinematographer Ronald Neame and producer Anthony Havelock-Allan in 1944. The company produced some of the major British films of the 1940s.

== History of Cineguild ==
Havelock-Allan served as associated producer on the war film In Which We Serve (1942), which starred Noël Coward, who co-directed the picture with David Lean. The director of photography on the film was Neame. Havelock-Allan, Lean, and Neame founded their own company, Cineguild, in 1944. Its first production was an adaptation of Coward's 1939 patriotic play This Happy Breed (1944) film adaptation released in the same year. The film was produced by Coward, directed by Lean, and shot by Neame. All three partners—Havelock-Allan, Lean and Neame—collaborated on the script.

The exact same combination of talents created the adaptation of Coward's comedy Blithe Spirit(1945), with Havelock-Allan and Neame sharing producing duties with Coward. The quartet then produced Brief Encounter (also 1945), with Havelock-Allan and Neame sharing producing duties with Coward, with Coward helping write the script, an adaption of his 1936 one-act play Still Life. Neame did not serve as director of photography on the film, or subsequent Cineguild productions. Instead, Robert Krasker was the lighting cameraman.

Brief Encounter won the Palme d'Or at the 1946 Cannes Film Festival. Lead Celia Johnson was nominated for an Academy Award for Best Actress at the 1947 awards, and Lean picked up the first of his seven Best Director Oscar nominations. Along with Havelock-Allan and Neame, Lean also was nominated for the Academy Award for Best Adapted Screenplay. One of the enduring classics of world cinema, in 1999, Brief Encounter came in second in a British Film Institute poll of the top 100 British films.

Havelock-Allan, Lean and Neame moved away from Coward and next filmed two classic by Charles Dickens, creating two classics of British cinema in the process, Great Expectations (1946) and Oliver Twist (1948). With Great Expectations, the trio repeated their earlier triumph with Brief Encounter and were nominated for the Best Adapted Screenplay Oscar. Lean also scored his second Best Director Oscar nomination, and the movie won a Best Picture nomination. John Bryan and Wilfred Shingleton were nominated for Best Art Direction-Set Decoration in black-and-white.

Guy Green, the director of photography on Great Expectations, won the Oscar for cinematography in black and white. Green would shoot all the remaining Cineguild productions, including Oliver Twist, though future Oscar-winner Geoffrey Unsworth was tasked with filming the exteriors on Blanche Fury (1948), which was directed by Marc Allégret. Blanche Fury was shot in Technicolor, and Unsworth had been with the Technicolor Motion Picture Corp. since 1937, in which he was involved in the shooting of the earliest colour films made in Britain.

After producing Blanche Fury and Oliver Twist, both of which were released in 1948, Havelock-Allan left Cineguild for Constellation Films, which he founded in 1947. Ronald Neame took over the director's chair on the film Take My Life (1947).

== Controversy ==
Oliver Twist was hurt financially when it was subjected to boycotts in Germany and the United States for perceived anti-semitism. The make-up of Alec Guinness, who portrayed Fagin, was based on George Cruikshank's original illustrations for the Dickens novel, and it was considered anti-semitic by some as it was felt to perpetrate Jewish racial stereotypes. Guinness wore heavy make-up, including a large prosthetic nose, to evoke Cruikshank's illustrations. The US Production Code Administration had advised David Lean to "bear in mind the advisability of omitting from the portrayal of Fagin any elements or inference that would be offensive to any specific racial group or religion." Lean commissioned the make-up artist Stuart Freeborn to create Fagin's features; Freeborn (himself part-Jewish) had suggested to David Lean that Fagin's exaggerated profile should be toned down for fear of causing offence, but Lean rejected this idea. Lean pointed out that Fagin was not explicitly identified as Jewish in the screenplay.

The March 1949 release of the film in Germany was met with protests outside the Kurbel Cinema by Jewish objectors. The Mayor of Berlin, Ernst Reuter, was a signatory to their petition which called for the withdrawal of the film. The depiction of Fagin was considered especially problematic in the recent aftermath of The Holocaust.

As a result of objections by the Anti-Defamation League of B'nai B'rith and the New York Board of Rabbis, the film was not released in the United States until 1951, with seven minutes of profile shots and other parts of Guinness's performance cut. It received great acclaim from critics, but, unlike Lean's Great Expectations, another Dickens adaptation, no Oscar nominations. The film was banned in Israel for anti-semitism. Ironically, it was banned in Egypt for portraying Fagin too sympathetically.

== Last films ==
Cineguild went on to produce two lesser known pictures before disbanding: The Passionate Friends (1949), a romantic drama produced by Ronald Neame and directed by David Lean (Lean also co-wrote the script); and Madeleine (1950), a film based on a true story of a wealthy woman in mid-19th Century Scotland who murders her lover, which also was directed by Lean. Both films starred Ann Todd, whom Lean married in 1949, between the production of the two films.

== Filmography ==
- This Happy Breed (1944)
- Blithe Spirit (1945)
- Brief Encounter (1945)
- Great Expectations (1946)
- Take My Life (1947)
- Blanche Fury (1948)
- Oliver Twist (1948)
- The Passionate Friends (1949)
- Madeleine (1950)
