= The Rest Is Silence (play) =

Play by Harold Purcell

The Rest is Silence
- Original language: English
- Written by: Harold Purcell
- Genre: Historical
- Setting: Glasgow, 1857

Premiere
- Date: 4 April 1944
- Place: Theatre Royal, Nottingham

The Rest is Silence is a 1944 historical play by the British writer Harold Purcell. It is based on the 1857 trial of Madeleine Smith accused of poisoning a former lover which concluded in a not proven verdict. The play premiered at the Theatre Royal, Nottingham on 4 April 1944 before transferring to the Prince of Wales Theatre in London's West End where it ran for 59 performances from 20 April to 3 June. The London cast featured Ann Todd as Madeleine Smith, Michael Whittaker, Peter Jones, Nicholas Hannen, Martin Walker, Hugh Miller, Karel Stepanek, Tristan Rawson, Sheila Burrell, Lesley Osmond, Lucy Griffiths and Renee Kelly. It was presented by George Black and choreographed by Wendy Toye.

The rights to the film were acquired by the Rank Organisation. However, when it came to the 1950 film Madeleine, also starring Todd, director David Lean chose to discard the play and base the screenplay entirely from reporting of the trial.

== Bibliography ==
- Jenkins, Brian. Madeleine Smith on Trial: A Glasgow Murder and the Young Woman Too Respectable to Convict. McFarland, 2019.
- Phillips, Gene. Beyond the Epic: The Life and Films of David Lean. University Press of Kentucky, 2006.
- Wearing, J. P. The London Stage 1940–1949: A Calendar of Productions, Performers, and Personnel. Rowman & Littlefield, 2014.
