= Jane Rose =

American actress (1913–1979)

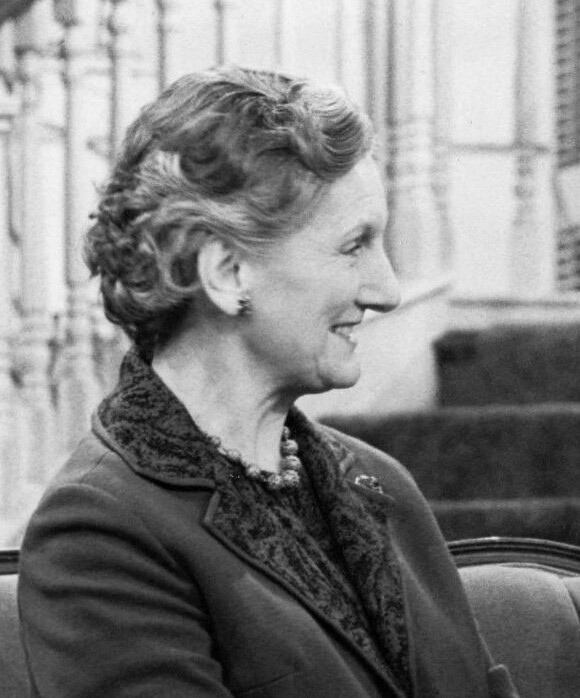
- Jane Rose in Phyllis (1975)
- Born: Jane Phin Rose; February 7, 1913; Spokane, Washington, U.S.
- Died: June 29, 1979 (aged 66); Studio City, California, U.S.
- Occupation: Actress
- Years active: 1951–1979

Jane Phin Rose (February 7, 1913 – June 29, 1979) was an American character actress, perhaps best remembered as Audrey Dexter, the gently befuddled mother-in-law of Cloris Leachman’s character (Phyllis Lindstrom) on the CBS sitcom Phyllis (1975–1977).

== Early life ==
Rose was born in Spokane, Washington, the only child born to Dr. Charles L. Rose, a Spokane dentist, and Dr. Frances Eastman, a Spokane physician. Eastman had a daughter, Angeline Kearny Lockhart, by a previous marriage. In her early years, Jane Rose participated in little theater. She was educated at Lewis and Clark High School, the University of Washington, and Columbia University.

== Career ==
Rose appeared in the original Broadway productions of The Time of the Cuckoo (1952–53), Orpheus Descending (1957), and The Gazebo (1958–59), as well as a revival of Bernard Shaw's Heartbreak House (1959–60), in which she played Nurse Guinness. She also performed for the New York Shakespeare Festival in such productions as All's Well That Ends Well, Richard III, and Measure for Measure."

Her films included David Lean's Summertime (1955), with Katharine Hepburn, Flipper (1963), and I Walk the Line (1970), with Gregory Peck and Tuesday Weld. Among her numerous TV credits were appearances on such shows as Robert Montgomery Presents, Car 54, Where Are You?, The Defenders, Route 66, All in the Family, Rhoda, Lou Grant, and Co-Ed Fever. In addition, she was featured on the daytime dramas Love of Life (in which she created the character of Sarah Dale), Dark Shadows, The Secret Storm, and Somerset.

In 1975, Rose was cast as Audrey Dexter, mother-in-law to Phyllis Lindstrom (Cloris Leachman), on Phyllis (1975–77). In 2005 – almost thirty years after Phyllis was cancelled - Rose was nominated for a TV Land Award as "Favorite Mother-in-Law".

Rose's last seen performance was as Mrs. Bulfinch in the ABC miniseries Roots: The Next Generations (1979).

Rose also worked with the New York Association for the Blind (she served eleven years as the Association's Director of Recreation), also taught acting, and was a pioneer in the use of drama as therapy for the blind.

== Death ==
She died of cancer on June 29, 1979, at her home in Studio City, California. She was 66.

== Filmography ==
=== Film ===
Year	Title	Role	Studio	Notes
1954	Garden of Eden	Latimore's Housekeeper	Excelsior Pictures	
1955	Summertime	Mrs. McIlhenny	United Artists	
1956	The Monte Carlo Story	Mrs. Edith Freeman	United Artists	
1961	One Plus One	Mrs. Kingsley	Selected Films	("Average Man" segment)
1963	Flipper	Hettie White	Metro-Goldwyn-Mayer	
1970	I Walk the Line	Elsie	Columbia Pictures	

=== Television ===
Year	Title	Role	Notes
1951–1960	Love of Life	Sarah Dale	Unknown episodes
1951	Goodyear Television Playhouse		Episode - "October Story"
1952	Schlitz Playhouse of Stars	Old Woman	Episode - "Autumn in New York"
1953	The Web		Episode - "Encore"
1953	Wonderful John Acton	Aunt Bessie	13 episodes
1953	Robert Montgomery Presents	Mama	Episode - "Really the Blues"
1954	The United States Steel Hour		Episode - "The Rise of Carthage"
1954	Hallmark Hall of Fame	First Witch	Episode - "Macbeth"
1954	Look Up and Live	Anna	Episode - "Tobias and the Angel: Part 3"
1955	Studio One	Mable	Episode - "Strange Companion"
1955	Mr. Citizen		Episode - "For My Brother"
1957	Decoy	Matron	Episode - "Deadly Corridor"
1958	Suspicion	Mrs. Russell	Episode - "The Woman Turned to Salt"
1958	Kraft Television Theatre	Edna	Episode - "Web of Guilt"
1958	Little Women		TV movie
1959	Armstrong Circle Theatre		Episode - "The Zone of Silence"
1960	Dillinger	Anna Sage	TV movie
1960	True Story	Nellie Smith	Episode - "Episode dated June 4, 1960"
1960	Shirley Temple's Storybook	Gypsy Mother	Episode - "Madeline"
1962	Car 54, Where Are You?	Boarding House Maid / Woman with Stroller	Episodes - "Toody Undercover" and "Pretzel Mary"
1963	The Defenders	Juror #5	Episode - "Judgment Eve"
1963	Route 66	Mrs. School	Episode - "What a Shining Young Man Was Our Gallant Lieutenant"
1964–1965	The Doctors and the Nurses	Miss Pritchard / Mrs. Briand	Episodes - "Where Park Runs into Vreeland", "Night of the Witch"
1966	Dark Shadows	Mrs. Mitchell	Episode - "Episode #1.1"
1966	ABC Stage 67		Episode - "The Love Song of Barney Kempinski"
1966	Hawk	Mrs. Colson	Episode - "The Hands of Corbin Claybrooke"
1970–1971	The Secret Storm	Aggie "Aunt Aggie" Parsons	Unknown episodes
1974	Great Performances	Agrafena	Episode - "Enemies"
1974–1975	Somerset	Becky Winkle	Unknown episodes
1975	All in the Family	Aunt Clara	Episode - "Edith's Friend"
1975–1977	Phyllis	Audrey Dexter	48 episodes
1977	Halloween with the New Addams Family	Grandmama Addams	TV movie
1978	The Tony Randall Show	Mrs. Tilden	Episode - "Eyes of the Law"
1978	Rhoda	Mary	Episode - "In Search of Martin"
1978	Lou Grant	Mrs. Walker	Episode - "Murder"
1979	Co-Ed Fever	Mrs. Selby	8 episodes, (final appearance)
1979	Roots: The Next Generations	Mrs. Bulfinch	TV miniseries - "Part VII"
