= Sally-Jane Spencer =

English actress (born 1948)

Sally-Jane Spencer (born 10 July 1948, Buckinghamshire) is an English actress best known for playing Linda Patterson, Reggie's daughter in the BBC television sitcom The Fall and Rise of Reginald Perrin (1976–79) and its sequel The Legacy of Reginald Perrin (1996). She appeared in the 1966 film The Great St Trinian's Train Robbery and the Bette Davis film The Anniversary (1968). She made her debut performance on the West End stage in The Prime Of Miss Jean Brodie. She is the daughter of British producer Norman Spencer.
