= Madeleine (1950 film) =

- Directed by: David Lean
- Written by: Stanley Haynes; Nicholas Phipps
- Produced by: Stanley Haynes
- Starring: Ann Todd; Ivan Desny; Norman Wooland; Leslie Banks
- Cinematography: Guy Green
- Edited by: Clive Donner; Geoffrey Foot
- Music by: William Alwyn
- Production company: Cineguild Productions
- Distributed by: General Film Distributors
- Release date: 16 February 1950 (London)
- Running time: 114 minutes
- Country: United Kingdom
- Language: English

Madeleine is a 1950 British period film noir directed by David Lean and starring Ann Todd, Norman Wooland, Ivan Desny and Leslie Banks. It is based on the true story of Madeleine Smith (Todd), a young Glasgow woman from a wealthy family who was tried in 1857 for the murder of her lover, Émile L'Angelier (Desny). The trial was much publicised in the newspapers of the day and labelled "the trial of the century".

Lean made the film primarily as a "wedding present" to his then-wife Todd, who had previously played the role onstage. He was never satisfied with the film and cited it as his least favourite feature-length movie. It was released by General Film Distributors on February 16, 1950.

== Plot ==
In 1855, an upper middle-class Victorian family purchases a house in Blythswood Square, Glasgow. Their eldest daughter Madeleine Smith claims the basement bedroom so she will have easy access to the servants' entrance and be able to entertain her lover without her family's knowledge. After they have moved in, her father James invites a wealthy society gentleman, William Minnoch, for dinner, whom Madeleine entertains with music and singing. When the dinner is over, Madeleine sneaks outside to see her lover, Frenchman Émile L'Angelier.

The next morning, James harshly encourages Madeleine to accept the affections of William, whom he sees a suitable husband for her. Meanwhile, she and L'Angelier become secretly engaged, but L'Angelier begins to press Madeleine to reveal his existence to her father, so they can marry. Frightened of her authoritarian father, Madeleine is reluctant to do so. Eventually, she visits L'Angelier in his room and says she will elope with him, rather than face telling her father. L'Angelier says he could never marry her this way. Madeleine now realises that he loves her not for herself, but only as a means to recover his position in society. She says their relationship is over and demands all her letters be returned.

After she breaks her engagement with L'Angelier, Madeleine tells William that she will accept his marriage proposal. Her family is happy, but L'Angelier shows up threatening to show her father the compromising letters in his possession unless she continues to see him. Saying nothing of her new engagement, Madeleine reluctantly agrees. Sometime later, Madeleine purchases arsenic poison from a local chemist. While her parents are away, she invites L'Angelier over for tea, which she has laced with arsenic.

Some weeks later, L'Angelier becomes very ill. He recovers, but later suffers a fatal relapse. When the cause of death is proven to be arsenic poisoning, Thuau, a friend of L'Angelier, arrives at the Smiths' residence to tell James he has the letters between Madeleine and L'Angelier. Pressed by her father, Madeleine denies knowing him, but confesses the truth. Thuau later suspects Madeleine of murder, who is found to have had arsenic in her possession at the time of L'Angelier's death. Madeleine is later tried for murder, in which the jury returns a verdict of "not proven", which releases Madeleine from custody as she is neither guilty nor acquitted.

== Cast ==
- Ann Todd as Madeleine Smith
- Norman Wooland as William Minnoch
- Ivan Desny as Émile L'Angelier
- Leslie Banks as Mr. James Smith
- Barbara Everest as Mrs. Smith
- Susan Stranks as Janet Smith
- Patricia Raine as Bessie Smith
- Elizabeth Sellars as Christina Hackett
- Edward Chapman as Dr. Thompson
- Jean Cadell as Mrs. Jenkins
- Eugene Deckers as Thuau
- André Morell as Defending Counsel
- Barry Jones as Prosecuting Counsel
- Ivor Barnard as Mr. Murdoch
- David Horne as Lord Justice-Clerk
- Henry Edwards as Clerk of the Court
- Amy Veness as Miss Aiken
- Kynaston Reeves as Dr. Penny
- Cameron Hall as Dr. Yeoman
- Irene Browne as Mrs. Grant
- Wylie Watson as Huggins
- Frederick Leister as Forbes
- John Laurie as Scots Divine
- George Benson as Estate Agent
- Anthony Newley as Chemist's Assistant
- Russell Waters as Jury Foreman
- Eva Bartok as Girl
- Nicholas Phipps as Reporter

== Production ==
Ann Todd had appeared in a stage version of the story, The Rest is Silence by Harold Purcell, in 1944. The Rank Organization bought the screen rights as a possible vehicle for Vivien Leigh. The play was not credited for the film of Madeleine because the final script followed the original facts enough to constitute an original screenplay. Charles Bennett wrote a version of the story, meaning to direct but his script was not used because David Lean wanted to make a version starring his wife Ann Todd.

Ann Todd requested her husband David Lean direct the film version. Eric Ambler worked on the script originally but fell ill and withdrew, replaced by Nicholas Phipps. Lean worked on the script throughout the shoot, which began in April 1949.

Yves Montand and Gerard Philipe were considered for the role of Émile, but both were unavailable. An unknown Ivan Desny was cast in his first lead role. He had previously done the French-language dubbing for Trevor Howard in Lean's Brief Encounter (1945).

== Reception ==
Ann Todd later said, "I loved Madeleine; David was never happy about it but I think he did it quite beautifully." Noël Coward told Lean the problem with the film was it never made up its mind whether Madeleine Smith was guilty or not. Clive Donner, who worked on the movie as an editor, thought the main flaw was there was no character in the film for the audience to identify with.

In a 2018 review for Sight and Sound, Brad Stevens called it "not only among Lean’s richest works, but also a key title in the history of British cinema," calling it "a slippery melodrama whose upper-class trappings mask a subversive rape-revenge core."

== Notes ==
- Brownlow, Kevin (1997). David Lean : a biography. A Wyatt Book for St. Martin's Press. ISBN 978-0-312-16810-0.
- Stevens, Brad (11 July 2018). "The Freudian revenge of David Lean's Madeleine". Sight and Sound.
