= Time Without Pity =

1957 British film by Joseph Losey

- Theatrical release poster
- Directed by: Joseph Losey
- Screenplay by: Ben Barzman
- Based on: Someone Waiting by Emlyn Williams
- Produced by: John Arnold; Anthony Simmons
- Starring: Michael Redgrave; Ann Todd; Leo McKern; Paul Daneman; Peter Cushing; Alec McCowen; Renee Houston
- Cinematography: Freddie Francis
- Edited by: Alan Osbiston
- Music by: Tristram Cary
- Production company: Harlequin Productions
- Distributed by: Eros Films (UK)
- Release date: March 1957
- Running time: 85 minutes
- Country: United Kingdom
- Language: English
- Budget: £100,412 or £108,875

Time Without Pity is a 1957 British thriller film noir directed by Joseph Losey from a screenplay by Ben Barzman, based on Emlyn Williams' 1953 play Someone Waiting. It stars Michael Redgrave, Ann Todd, Leo McKern, Paul Daneman, Peter Cushing, Alec McCowen and Renee Houston.

The film was directed by Losey after he was blacklisted in the U.S. during the McCarthy era. It was his second film in Britain and his first under his own name.

== Plot ==
David Graham, a recovering alcoholic, returns to England having only one day in which to save his son Alec from hanging for the murder of Alec's girlfriend, Jenny Cole. Graham has been a neglectful, absentee father who missed the entire trial while he was in a sanatorium in Canada. At first, Alec refuses to see Graham, and when they do meet, Alec is without any hope for reprieve and cannot show any affection for his father.

His sobriety in constant jeopardy, Graham believes that his son is innocent and begins a frantic last-minute effort to find evidence that will save his son's life, if not redeem himself as a father. With the help of his son's steadfast solicitor, Graham desperately, and often ineffectively, investigates the circumstances surrounding the girl's murder, visiting first her furious sister and then the home of wealthy car magnate Robert Stanford, where the girlfriend was killed. Stanford and his family have provided the only real support that Alec has ever known.

Graham ricochets between potential allies, foes and new leads in order to learn who the real murderer could be, with suspects including Stanford's beautiful wife Honor, his even younger secretary Vickie Harker, and his adopted son and Alec's best friend, Brian, who allows Graham to see what his own misspent life looked like through his son's eyes.

With the Home Office on standby to receive any evidence proving Alec's innocence, Graham is forced to extreme measures to try to establish the real killer's guilt.

In a private room, Graham is permitted a final meeting with his son, with Honor there. Alec passionately kisses Honor, adding a new dimension. The conversation also alludes to Alec's relationship with Jenny. Honor leaves to allow father and son a final embrace, and more confessions are made.

Graham visits a pub with Stanford and gathers some more clues before getting very drunk.

At Vickie Harker's home, he learns that Stanford's alibi of spending the night with her was not true. He confronts Stanford at his race track where he is test-driving a Mercedes 300SL. Stanford explains that anyone can be bought and offers Graham shares in his company in exchange for silence. Still lacking evidence, in desperation Graham sacrifices his own life to create the appearance of a second act of murder by Stanford, thereby incriminating him for the first killing and saving Alec's life.

== Cast ==
- Michael Redgrave as David Graham
- Ann Todd as Honor Stanford
- Leo McKern as Robert Stanford
- Paul Daneman as Brian Stanford
- Peter Cushing as Jeremy Clayton
- Alec McCowen as Alec Graham
- Renée Houston as Mrs. Harker
- Lois Maxwell as Vickie Harker
- Richard Wordsworth as Maxwell
- George Devine as Barnes
- Joan Plowright as Agnes Cole
- Ernest Clark as Undersecretary, Home Office
- Peter Copley as prison chaplain
- Hugh Moxey as prison governor
- Dickie Henderson as comedian
- John Chandos as first journalist
- Vernon Greeves as second journalist
- Arnold Diamond as third journalist
- Julian Somers as first warder
- Aubrey Richards as prison gatekeeper

== Production ==
Freddie Francis liked working with Losey "because he was very nervous, hadn't done a film for a long time and needed a lot of help. And I like it when people need help."

== Critical reception ==
Kinematograph Weekly said it "met with a favourable reception."

Monthly Film Bulletin said "Although it is rumoured that Joseph Losey has been employed on several British productions, Time Without Pity is the first feature film to credit his name since his arrival in this country six years ago. The style of the film is immediately recognisable – the exaggerated hysteria which characterised Losey's American work (M and The Big Night). The key scenes are heightened to a pitch which the script will hardly sustain; the characters are continually occupied with feverish, cinematic "'business" (newspaper editors punctuating their conversation with dart-throwing, a drunken old woman in a crowded room full of alarm clocks). The handling of the interestingly varied cast is creditable: Michael Redgrave gives a sensitive and accomplished interpretation of the difficult role of the introspective alcoholic. Alec McCowen as the son and Leo McKern as the crazed motor-manufacturer both give stylish performances. In the version seen by the reviewer, there appear to have been considerable cuts in a climactic scene of violence."

In British Sound Films: The Studio Years 1928–1959 David Quinlan rated the film as "average", writing: "Stylishly acted, but over-directed drama. Very sombre."

Leslie Halliwell said: "Heavy-going, introspective, hysterical, downbeat melodrama which takes itself with a seriousness which is almost deadly."

The Radio Times Guide to Films gave the film 3/5 stars, writing: "Although the story of a father trying to save his son from the gallows is supposed to be a thriller, Losey places so much emphasis on the capital punishment angle that the social theme too often swamps the suspense. Michael Redgrave is solid, however, as the alcoholic dad fighting against time."
