= Ann and Harold =

1938 British TV serial

Ann and Harold is the first ever British television serial. The programme, written by Louis Goodrich, ran on BBC television for a total of five 20-minute episodes in July and August 1938. It starred Ann Todd and William Hutchison in the "story of a London society couple's romance, from their meeting to their grand society wedding."

No footage of the show survives, as it was aired live before any means of recording television programs existed. Two photographs exist as a visual record of the production.
