= Someone Waiting =

1953 play written by Emlyn Williams

- Broadway programme
- Written by: Emlyn Williams
- Original language: English
- Genre: Thriller
- Setting: Drawing room of the Nedlows' apartment, Mill Court, London. Present time.

Premiere
- Date premiered: 14 September 1953
- Place premiered: Royal Court Theatre, Liverpool

Someone Waiting is a 1953 thriller play by the British writer Emlyn Williams.

It premiered at the Royal Court Theatre, Liverpool before transferring to the Globe Theatre in London's West End where it ran for 156 performances between 25 November 1953 and 10 April 1954. The cast included Williams himself as well as Gabrielle Brune, Adrianne Allen, Gladys Henson, Campbell Cotts and John Stratton. It appeared at the John Golden Theatre on Broadway in February 1956 with Leo G. Carroll, Jessie Royce Landis and Norah Howard in the cast, but this lasted for only 15 shows.

In 1957 it was adapted into the film Time Without Pity directed by Joseph Losey.

In 1965 the play was staged by the Edinburgh Gateway Company, directed by Victor Carin.

== Bibliography ==
- Kabatchnik, Amnon. Blood on the Stage, 1925-1950: Milestone Plays of Crime, Mystery, and Detection : an Annotated Repertoire. Scarecrow Press, 2010.
- Wearing, J.P. The London Stage 1950-1959: A Calendar of Productions, Performers, and Personnel. Rowman & Littlefield, 2014.
