= Summertime (1955 film) =

1955 film by David Lean

- Theatrical release poster
- Directed by: David Lean
- Screenplay by: David Lean; H. E. Bates
- Based on: The Time of the Cuckoo by Arthur Laurents
- Produced by: Ilya Lopert: Norman Spencer
- Starring: Katharine Hepburn; Rossano Brazzi; Darren McGavin; Isa Miranda
- Cinematography: Jack Hildyard
- Edited by: Peter Taylor
- Music by: Alessandro Cicognini
- Production company: London Films
- Distributed by: United Artists
- Release dates: May 29, 1955 (Venice); June 21, 1955 (New York City); November 7, 1955 (United Kingdom)
- Running time: 100 minutes
- Countries: United States; United Kingdom; Italy
- Language: English
- Budget: $1.1 million
- Box office: $4-5 million (global gross) (estimate) $2 million (US)

Summertime is a 1955 romantic drama film directed by David Lean, and starring Katharine Hepburn, Rossano Brazzi, Darren McGavin, and Isa Miranda. It follows a lonely middle-aged American secretary and her experiences touring Venice alone for the first time, during which she falls in love with an Italian antiques dealer. Lean co-wrote the screenplay with H. E. Bates, based on the play The Time of the Cuckoo by Arthur Laurents.

The film was shot on location in Venice in 1954 on Eastmancolor negative film with processing and prints by Technicolor. A co-production between the United States, United Kingdom, and Italy, Summertime was released theatrically by United Artists in the U.S. on June 21, 1955, and premiered in the United Kingdom later that Autumn under the alternative title Summer Madness.

== Plot ==
Jane Hudson is an unmarried, middle-aged, self-described "fancy secretary" from Akron, Ohio, on her summer vacation, enjoying her lifelong dream of a trip to Europe, ending in Venice, after having saved money for it over several years. On the vaporetto to her hotel, she meets two fellow Americans, Lloyd and Edith McIlhenny. At the hotel, they are greeted by Signora Fiorini, a widow who has converted her home into a pensione. Also staying at the property are Eddie Yaeger, a young American painter, and his wife Phyl. Jane is pestered off and on during her stay by Mauro, a friendly Italian street urchin.

On her first evening in Venice, Jane walks to the Piazza San Marco, where the sight of so many romantic couples intensifies her loneliness. While seated at an outdoor caffe, she becomes aware of a lone Italian man watching her; panicked, she quickly leaves.

The following day, Jane goes shopping and sees a red glass goblet in an antiques store's window. Upon entering the shop, she discovers that the owner, Renato de Rossi, is the man from whom she had fled the night before. He assures her that the goblet is an authentic 18th-century artifact, and she purchases it after he teaches her the art of bargaining. Hoping to see her again, Renato offers to search for a matching goblet. The next morning, Jane returns to the shop with Mauro, and is disappointed to discover that Renato is not there. Jane is humiliated when she accidentally steps backward into a canal while filming de Rossi's shop. She begs Mauro to take her home to the Pensione Fiorini.

That evening, de Rossi comes to her pensione and confesses his attraction for her. When Jane resists his advances, he warns her not to waste an opportunity for happiness. She seems on the verge of agreeing to have dinner with him when the McIlhennys return from a shopping trip to Murano where they purchased a set of new red goblets similar to the one Jane bought. Renato realizes that Jane now thinks he has swindled her, but he assures her that the same designs have been used for centuries in Venice and he insists that her goblet is a genuine antique. Jane's anger subsides, and the promise of Rossini in the Piazza San Marco convinces her to accept his invitation.

The couple attend the moonlit concert in the piazza, where an orchestra plays the overture to La gazza ladra. When a flower seller approaches them, Renato is surprised when Jane chooses a simple gardenia instead of an orchid. Later, as the couple wander through Venice, Jane drops her gardenia into a canal; despite much effort, Renato is unable to retrieve it for her. As they return to the pensione, Renato kisses Jane, and she responds passionately and murmurs, "I love you", before rushing off to her room. The next day, Jane treats herself to salon treatments and new clothes in anticipation of their date that evening. While she waits for him at the piazza, Renato's "nephew" Vito arrives and inadvertently reveals that he is actually Renato's son. Stunned to discover Renato is married and has several children, Jane takes refuge in a bar where she encounters Phyl, who confides that her marriage to Eddie is in trouble.

Upon returning to the pensione, Jane discovers that Eddie is having an affair with Signora Fiorini, with Mauro acting as go-between. She is appalled, saying "Something happens to this city at night." Renato arrives and tells her that in Italy things are different, and the relationship between the Signora and Eddie is none of her business. He admits that he is married, but claims that he and his wife are separated, which he had concealed because he did not want to scare her away. He accuses her of being immature and unwilling to accept what she can have rather than longing for the unattainable. Jane relents. Their date continues at an open-air courtyard night club, where they dance the night away. Afterwards, with fireworks in the distance, Jane and Renato go to Renato's home where their affair is consummated.

The couple spend several idyllic days on Burano. Jane, unwilling to remain in a relationship she knows is destined to end unhappily, decides to return home early. Renato begs her to stay, but Jane insists on leaving, arguing that it is better to leave a party before it ends. Although Jane asks Renato not to come to the railway station, she hopes he will ignore her request. Later, on the station platform, Mauro runs up to say goodbye and offers Jane a free trinket as a gift. As the train begins to leave the station, Jane is thrilled to see Renato running down the platform. He tries to hand her a package through the window but the train is moving too quickly. He stops, opens the box, and holds up his gift: another gardenia.

== Cast ==
- Katharine Hepburn as Jane Hudson, a lonely spinster who saved all her life to finally make her dream trip come true.
- Rossano Brazzi as Renato de Rossi
- Darren McGavin as Eddie Yaeger
- Jane Rose as Edith McIlhenny
- Mari Aldon as Phyl Yaeger
- MacDonald Parke as Lloyd McIlhenny
- Gaetano Autiero as Mauro
- Jeremy Spenser as Vito de Rossi
- Isa Miranda as Signora Fiorini
- Virginia Simion as Giovanna
- André Morell as Englishman in train compartment (uncredited)
- Gino Cavalieri as porter at the station (uncredited)

== Production ==
=== Development ===
Arthur Laurents had written The Time of the Cuckoo specifically for Shirley Booth, who starred in the 1952 Broadway production and won the Tony Award for Best Actress in a Play for her performance. Producer Hal Wallis expressed interest in purchasing the film rights, but felt Booth was too old for the role, and envisioned Katharine Hepburn and Ezio Pinza in the leads. Ilya Lopert ultimately acquired the rights with the intention of casting Booth and hiring Anatole Litvak to direct. It was later reported that she was negotiating with Daniel Mann instead, and Laurents would be adapting his play for the screen. Laurents' screenplay was allegedly unsatisfactory, and newly hired director David Lean tried to improve it with associate producer Norman Spencer and writers Donald Ogden Stewart and S.N. Behrman, but without success. He finally brought in novelist H.E. Bates to collaborate with him.

Numerous names were mentioned in conjunction with the project before filming finally began. At one point producer Lopert considered casting director-actor Vittorio De Sica as Renato. Roberto Rossellini expressed interest in directing the film with Ingrid Bergman as Jane, and Olivia de Havilland supposedly considered starring in the project.

=== Filming ===
Principal photography took place on location in Venice in the summer of 1954 on a budget of $1.1 million. Finance came in part from the Woolf brothers. It was one of the first British-produced films to be shot entirely on location. Interior sequences set in the Pensione Fiorini were filmed in studio, though the scenes occurring on the Pensione's veranda were shot along Venice's Grand Canal on a terrace constructed on an empty lot.

Italian government officials initially resisted director David Lean's request to allow his crew to film on location during the summer months, the height of the tourist season, especially when local gondolieri, fearful they would lose income, threatened to strike if he was given permission to do so. The problem was resolved when United Artists made a generous donation to the fund established to finance the restoration of St Mark's Basilica. Lean also was required to promise the cardinal that no short dresses or bare arms would be seen in or near the city's holy sites.

In one scene, Jane Hudson falls into a canal as she steps backwards while photographing Di Rossi's shop in Campo San Barnaba. Leading lady Katharine Hepburn, concerned about her health, was disinclined to do the stunt herself, but Lean felt it would be obvious if he replaced her with a stunt double. He filled the water with a disinfectant that caused it to foam, which added to Hepburn's reluctance, then required her to film the scene approximately four times until he was satisfied with the results. To protect her skin, Hepburn was covered with Vaseline. Later that night, Hepburn's eyes began to itch and water. She was eventually diagnosed with a rare form of conjunctivitis that plagued her for the rest of her life.

Upon seeing the completed film, Production Code Administration head Geoffrey Shurlock notified United Artists executives that the film would not be approved because of its depiction of adultery. Of particular concern was the scene in which Jane and Renato consummate their relationship. 18 feet (5.5 m) of film were deleted, and the PCA granted its approval. The National Catholic Legion of Decency, however, objected to a line of dialogue that was finally trimmed, and the organisation bestowed the film with a B-rating, designating the film "morally objectionable in part".

== Release ==
=== Box office ===
Following its premiere at Venice's Palace Theatre on May 29, 1955, Summertime premiered on June 21, 1955, at the Astor Theatre in New York City. By January 1956, the film had grossed $2 million domestically. This was considered a disappointment but the film performed very well internationally.

The film was released in the United Kingdom in November 1955 under the title Summer Madness.

=== Censorship ===
The film was banned in India in 1955. Lean suspected the Indian film censors objected to the film due to its depiction of an American spinster falling in love with a married Italian man, despite the fact that his character is separated from his wife. In Germany, the film received several cuts, though Lean never divulged exactly what was excised from the original version.

== Critical reception ==
Bosley Crowther of The New York Times observed:

In adapting for the screen Arthur Laurents' stage play The Time of the Cuckoo, Mr. Lean and H.E. Bates discarded most of the individual shadings and psychological subtleties of that romance. They reduced the complicated pondering of an American woman's first go at love with a middle-aged merchant of Venice to pleasingly elemental terms. And they let the evident inspiration for their heroine's emotional release be little more than the spell cast by the city upon her fitful and lonely state of mind. The challenge thus set of making Venice the moving force in propelling the play has been met by Mr. Lean as the director with magnificent feeling and skill. Through the lens of his color camera, the wondrous city of spectacles and moods becomes a rich and exciting organism that fairly takes command of the screen. And the curious hypnotic fascination of that labyrinthine place beside the sea is brilliantly conveyed to the viewer as the impulse for the character's passing moods.

Film scholar Gene Phillips describes Summertime as a film that "oscillates between an old-school farce" and a "more knowing, intimate depiction of relationships in modern society."

A reviewer for Variety wrote that the film "stacks up as promising entertainment - with some reservations. There is a lack of cohesion and some abruptness in plot transition without a too-clear buildup. Lesser characterizations, too, are on the sketchy side. Rossano Brazzi scores a triumph of charm and reserve. Hepburn turns in a feverish acting chore of proud loneliness. Rossano lately revealed that he used to have a serious crush on his costar, Katharine Hepburn, and confessed it to her. She gifted him with a painting of him, realized by herself. " Pauline Kael praised Hepburn's performance in the film, deeming her "probably the greatest actress of the sound era."

In the 21st-century, Laura Bushell of Channel 4 rated the film four out of five stars and commented, "Hepburn made a career out of playing vibrant heroines with a vulnerable side and it's her portrayal of Jane's insecurity and loneliness that give the film its substance. ... Summertime's notions of dating etiquette and holiday romance have dated greatly ... but as a coming-of-age story it remains touching. As a showcase for Katharine Hepburn, it is superb."

On the review aggregator website Rotten Tomatoes, 92% of 25 critics' reviews are positive. The website's consensus reads: "With Katharine Hepburn and the city of Venice glowing under David Lean's direction, Summertime is a swooning romance for the ages."

== Accolades ==
Award	Category	Nominee(s)	Result	Ref.
Academy Awards	Best Director	David Lean	Nominated	
Academy Awards	Best Actress	Katharine Hepburn	Nominated	
British Academy Film Awards	Best Film		Nominated	
British Academy Film Awards	Best Actress	Katharine Hepburn	Nominated	
National Board of Review Awards	Top Ten Films		5th Place	
New York Film Critics Circle Awards	Best Director	David Lean	Won	
New York Film Critics Circle Awards	Best Actress	Katharine Hepburn	Nominated	

=== Home media ===
The Criterion Collection released Summertime on LaserDisc in 1991, followed by a DVD edition in 1998. A Blu-ray edition was eventually issued by Criterion on July 12, 2022, featuring a new 4K restoration from the original film elements.

== Legacy ==
In later years, Lean described Summertime as his favourite, and became so enamoured of Venice during filming that he made it his second home. Commenting on the film, Lean said: "I've put more of myself in that film than any other I've ever made."

Right before his death, filmmaker Hal Ashby had pondered remaking the film. Rosanna Arquette revealed that Ashby had wanted her to play the role of Jane Hudson.

The Academy Film Archive preserved Summertime in 2008.

== See also ==
- Do I Hear a Waltz? (1965), a musical with a book by Arthur Laurents, music by Richard Rodgers, and lyrics by Stephen Sondheim. Also adapted from Laurents' 1952 play The Time of the Cuckoo.
- List of American films of 1955

== Sources ==
- Edwards, Anne (1985). A Remarkable Woman: A Biography of Katharine Hepburn. New York: William Morrow & Company, Inc. ISBN 978-0-688-04528-9.
- Phillips, Gene (2006). Beyond the Epic: The Life and Films of David Lean. Lexington, Kentucky: University of Kentucky Press. ISBN 978-0-813-17155-5.
