= Ann Todd =

English actress (1907–1993)

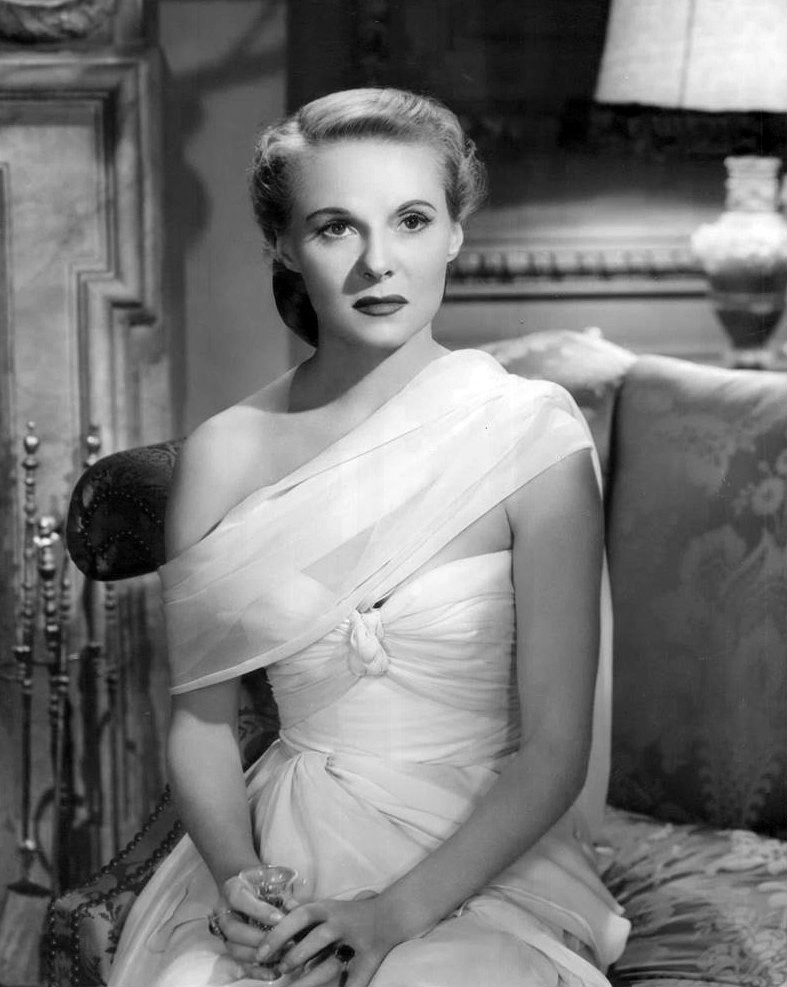
- Todd in The Paradine Case, 1947.
- Born: 24 January 1907; Hartford, Cheshire, England
- Died: 6 May 1993 (aged 86); Chelsea, London, England
- Education: Royal Central School of Speech and Drama
- Occupation: Actress
- Years active: 1931–1992
- Spouse(s): Victor N. Malcolm (m. 1933; div. 1939) Nigel Tangye (m. 1939; div. 1949) David Lean (m. 1949; div. 1957)
- Children: 2

Dorothy Ann Todd (24 January 1907 – 6 May 1993) was an English film, television and stage actress who achieved international fame when she starred in The Seventh Veil (1945). From 1949 to 1957 she was married to David Lean who directed her in The Passionate Friends (1949), Madeleine (1950), and The Sound Barrier (1952). She was a member of The Old Vic theatre company and in 1957 starred in a Broadway play. In her later years she wrote, produced and directed travel documentaries.

== Early years ==
Todd was born in Hartford, Cheshire. Although latterly claiming to be born in 1909, the 1911 census records show her born in 1907 and christened in March 1907. Her Scottish-born father Thomas, was a salesman, and her London-born mother Constance a housewife. She had a younger brother, Harold Brooke (who took their mother's maiden name), who became a screenwriter of light comedies.

After the family moved to London, Todd was educated at St. Winifrid's School, Eastbourne, Sussex. She studied speech training and drama under Elsie Fogerty at the Central School of Speech and Drama, then based at the Royal Albert Hall, London, with the intention of becoming a drama teacher. But during her studies, she made her stage debut as a fairy in The Land of Heart's Desire at the Arts Theatre Club in Soho, and decided instead to pursue a career in acting.

== Film ==
Initially a London-based theatre actress, she quickly began to accumulate walk-on parts in film, making her film debut in Keepers of Youth (1931). She had roles in These Charming People (1931), The Ghost Train (1931), The Water Gipsies (1932) and The Return of Bulldog Drummond (1934).

For Alex Korda, Todd was in Things to Come (1936), Action for Slander (1937), The Squeaker (1937), and South Riding (1938).

During World War II, Todd was in Poison Pen (1939), Danny Boy (1941), and Ships with Wings (1941). But she concentrated later again on theatre roles, putting in a memorable performance in Enid Bagnold's psychological thriller "Lottie Dundass" at the Vaudeville Theatre in 1943.

=== Stardom ===
Todd returned to film post-WWII with a good support role in a big hit, Perfect Strangers (1945, as a nurse), then had a huge success when she played a suicidal concert pianist in The Seventh Veil (1945), opposite James Mason. She followed this with a musical, Gaiety George (1946) and a noir, Daybreak (shot in 1946, released in 1948).

The Seventh Veil was a hit in the US as well as the UK. In 1946, having been signed by producer David O. Selznick, Todd was said to be the "holder of the most lucrative contract ever signed by an English cinema actress, with over a million dollars involved in its clauses." She commented in subsequent interviews that she continued to do her own grocery shopping, and latterly in her autobiography noted that she paid $880,000 in taxes on the contract.

She received a Hollywood offer from Alfred Hitchcock to play Gregory Peck's wife in The Paradine Case (1947), which was a flop. So Evil My Love (1948), a US-British co-production, was a box office disappointment, as was The Passionate Friends (1949), directed by her then husband David Lean. Lean also directed Todd in Madeleine (1950) and The Sound Barrier (1952); the latter was successful commercially.

Todd appeared in some thrillers, The Green Scarf (1954) and Time Without Pity (1957). She appeared in Hammer Films' Taste of Fear (1961).

=== Television ===
Todd appeared in Ann and Harold (1938), the first British TV serial. Todd starred in two episodes of Playhouse 90: "Not the Glory" and "The Grey Nurse Said Nothing". She also appeared in the title role of "Sylvia" on Alfred Hitchcock Presents (Season 3, episode 16) in 1958.

=== Stage ===
In 1941, she appeared at St Martin's Theatre in Kenneth Horne's comedy Love in a Mist. In 1944 she played Madeleine Smith in The Rest is Silence at the Prince of Wales Theatre, a role she would later return to in the 1950 film Madeleine In 1951 she reprised her film role in a stage version of The Seventh Veil in the West End. In 1957, post her divorce from David Lean, Todd made her Broadway-debut in the production of Four Winds.

== Later career ==
After co-starring in Ninety Degrees in the Shade in 1965, Todd effectively retired from acting, only returning throughout her life to roles to finance her new career producing a series of travel films. Her autobiography was titled The Eighth Veil, an allusion to the film which made her a star in Britain. Todd was known as the "pocket Garbo" for her diminutive, blonde beauty.

== Personal life ==
Todd said of herself, "I'm really very shy, and I get over that playing an actress."

Todd married three times. Her first husband, Victor N. Malcolm, was a grandson of Lillie Langtry; she had a son with him named David Malcolm. Her second and third husbands (Nigel Tangye and David Lean) were first cousins. She had a daughter with Nigel Tangye named Ann Francesca Tangye. She was divorced from Tangye on 12 March 1949.

Todd married film director Lean on 21 May 1949 and starred successively in three of his films: The Passionate Friends (1949), Madeleine (1950) and The Sound Barrier (1952). Lean and Todd divorced 15 July 1957.

== Death ==
Todd died from a stroke at the Chelsea and Westminster Hospital on 6 May 1993, aged 86.

== Partial filmography ==
- These Charming People (1931) as Pamela Crawford
- The Ghost Train (1931) as Peggy Murdock
- Keepers of Youth (1931) as Millicent
- The Water Gipsies (1932) as Jane Bell
- The Return of Bulldog Drummond (1934) as Phyllis Drummond
- Things to Come (1936) as Mary Gordon
- Action for Slander (1937) as Ann Daviot
- The Squeaker (1937) as Carol Stedman
- South Riding (1938) as Midge Carne
- Ann and Harold (1938, TV Series) as Ann Teviot
- Poison Pen (1939) as Ann Rider
- Danny Boy (1941) as Jane Kaye
- Ships with Wings (1942) as Kay Gordon
- Perfect Strangers (1945) as Elena
- The Seventh Veil (1945) as Francesca
- Gaiety George (1946) as Kathryn Davis
- The Paradine Case (1947) as Gay Keane
- So Evil My Love (1948) as Olivia Harwood
- Daybreak (1948) as Frankie
- The Passionate Friends (1949) as Mary Justin
- Madeleine (1950) as Madeleine Smith
- The Sound Barrier (1952) as Susan Garthwaite
- BBC Sunday-Night Theatre (1952–1954, TV Series) as Grand Duchess Tatiana Petrovna / Princess Louise
- The Green Scarf (1954) as Solange Vauthier
- The Alcoa Hour (1955, TV Series) as Jane Cornish
- The United States Steel Hour (1955, TV Series) as Evelyn Holt
- Time Without Pity (1957) as Honor Stanford
- Climax! (1957, TV Series) as Jane Palmer
- General Electric Theater (1958, TV Series) as Cynthia Spence
- Alfred Hitchcock Presents (1958) (Season 3 Episode 16: "Sylvia") as Sylvia Leeds Kent
- Playhouse 90 (1958–1959, TV Series) as Laura Mills / Lady Diane Goodfellow
- Armchair Theatre (1958–1966, TV Series) as Lady Baynton / Marguerite Gautier
- The Offshore Island (1959, TV Movie) as Rachel Verney
- Taste of Fear (1961) as Jane Appleby
- Thriller (American TV series) (1961), as Sylvia Lawrence
- The Son of Captain Blood (1962) as Arabella Blood
- Ninety Degrees in the Shade (1965) as Mrs Kurka
- Thirty-Minute Theatre (1967, TV Series) as The Woman
- The Fiend (1972) as Birdy Wemys
- The Human Factor (1979) as Castle's mother
- Maelstrom (1985, TV Mini-Series) as Astrid Linderman
- Screen Two (1986, TV Series) as Mrs. Forbes-Duthie
- Maigret (1992, TV Series) as Mlle. Josette (final appearance)

== Radio appearances ==
Year	Programme	Episode/source
1946	This Is Hollywood	The Seventh Veil
