= The Passionate Friends: A Novel =

1913 novel by H. G. Wells

The Passionate Friends
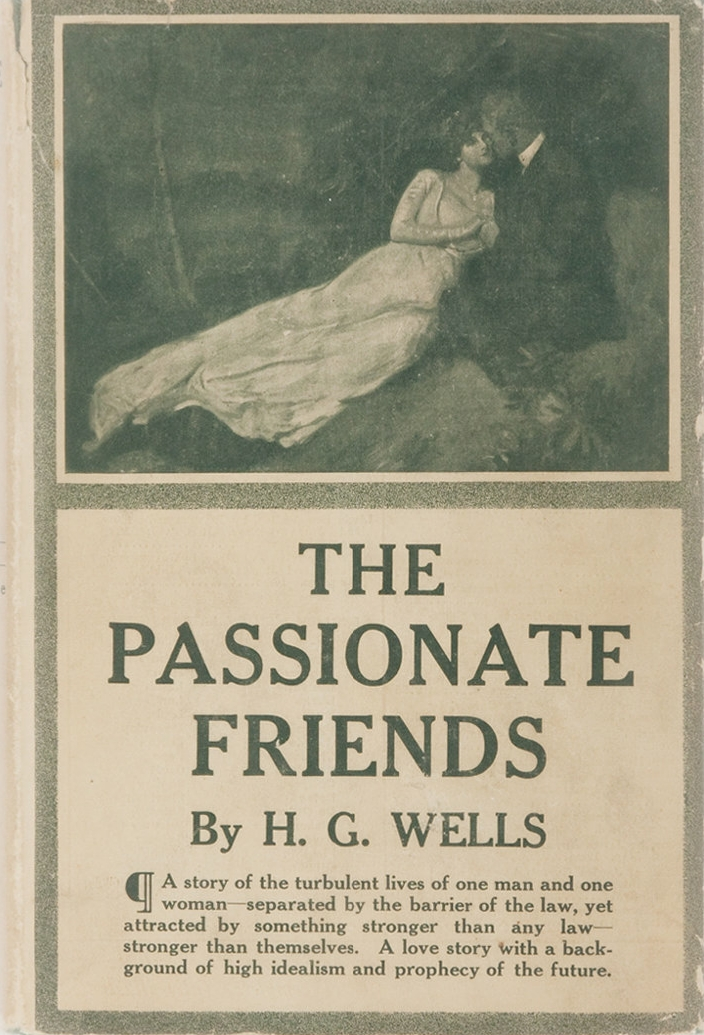
- First edition
- Author: H. G. Wells
- Original title: The Passionate Friends: A Novel
- Language: English
- Publisher: Harper and Brothers
- Publication date: 1913
- Publication place: United Kingdom
- English publication date: September 1913
- Pages: 363

The Passionate Friends is a 1913 coming of age novel by H. G. Wells detailing the life and travels of a young man. It is notable as the first introduction of Wells's notion of an "open conspiracy" of individuals to achieve a world state.

== Background ==
The narrator says that "The idea of writing such a book as this came to me first as I sat by the dead body of your grandfather." Wells's father, Joseph, died of heart failure on 14 October 1910, at the age of 82, and one biographer has noted that his death "neatly coincided with the end of his major period as a creative writer." Much of the novel was written at the end of 1911.

Wells was attached to the notion that parents might become the "friends" of their adult children, and the novel's protagonist Stephen Stratton wonders: "Why is it, I thought, that when a son has come to manhood he cannot take his father for a friend?"

The novel is mysteriously dedicated to "L. E. N. S.," possibly referring to Wells' lover Elizabeth von Arnim, whom Wells had nicknamed "little e" and with whom he enjoyed assignations at her house, the Château Soleil, in the Alps, at the ski resort of Montana, Switzerland.

== Plot summary ==
The protagonist is the novel's first-person narrator, Stephen Stratton. The most important relationship of Stephen's life is with the Lady Mary Christian, with whom he falls in love at the age of nineteen during the summer before he begins his studies at Oxford. Mary returns his love, but weds Justin, a wealthy financier.

In despair, Stephen volunteers to fight in South Africa, where the Second Boer War has just begun. Back in England he decides to pursue a political career and reconnects with Lady Mary Justin, and they become lovers. Disaster strikes when Justin sees Stephen kiss his wife. Justin hides Mary away in an Irish castle and forces Stephen to leave England for three years.

Traveling the world, Stephen studies Asian societies and develops convictions about the historical development of humanity. In a villa on the Rhine he meets his old love Rachel again, and they are married. Stephen begins a career as a publisher of world literature and reference books.

In 1909, Stephen receives a letter from Lady Mary Justin and they begin a longstanding written correspondence. By chance, they meet again at an inn in the Alps, and share several hours of spiritual communing; they scarcely touch and never kiss. Mary's companion betrays her to her husband, whose decision to divorce Mary after a trial for adultery threatens them both with social disaster. To forestall this, Mary dies by suicide.

== Reception ==
The Passionate Friends was appreciated by Wells's friends Ford Madox Hueffer and Violet Hunt, and by Maurice Baring. Reviews were largely positive. Wells affected, in a letter to Henry James, to consider the novel "gawky" and to believe that "It has been thrust into the world too soon."

Work was begun on a stage version, but this did not come to fruition. Two films of the same name have been made from the novel, one in 1922 and another in 1949.

The Passionate Friends was translated into Italian in 1914, into French in 1919, into Russian in 1924 and into Czech in 1928. When it was republished in the Atlantic Edition of his collected works (1926), Wells appended three essays to it: "Divorce," "The Endowment of Motherhood," and "The Great State."
