= Hobson's Choice (1954 film) =

1954 film by David Lean

- Theatrical release poster
- Directed by: David Lean
- Written by: Harold Brighouse (play); Wynyard Browne; David Lean; Norman Spencer
- Based on: Hobson's Choice; 1915 play by Harold Brighouse
- Produced by: David Lean
- Starring: Charles Laughton; John Mills; Brenda de Banzie; Daphne Anderson; Prunella Scales
- Cinematography: Jack Hildyard
- Edited by: Peter Taylor
- Music by: Malcolm Arnold
- Production company: London Films
- Distributed by: British Lion Films; United Artists
- Release date: 19 April 1954
- Running time: 107 minutes
- Country: United Kingdom
- Language: English
- Box office: £206,579

Hobson's Choice is a 1954 British romantic comedy film directed by David Lean. It is based on the 1915 play of the same name by Harold Brighouse, and stars Charles Laughton in the role of Victorian boot shop owner Henry Hobson, John Mills as timid but highly talented bootmaker Will Mossop, and Brenda de Banzie as Hobson's unmarried eldest daughter, Maggie.

Hobson's Choice won the British Academy Film Award for Best British Film 1954.

== Plot ==
Henry Hobson is the autocratic proprietor of a moderately upmarket boot shop in 1880 Salford, Manchester, England. A widower, Hobson is a notorious miser with a heavy taste for drink. He has three grown daughters: industrious Maggie, the eldest, and the less-dedicated, much more attractive Alice and Vicky. All three have kept house and worked in their father's shop their whole lives without wages. Alice and Vicky have beaus and are eager to marry. Alice is wooed by Albert Prosser, a young up-and-coming solicitor, and Vicky has the torch of Freddy Beenstock, the son of a teetotaling corn merchant. Hobson declares he has no intention to pay marriage settlements to marry off the younger girls, and declares the spinsterish Maggie is too useful to lose.

Unwilling to be bypassed in marriage and saddled to a life of caring for her alcoholic father, Maggie decides to wed Will Mossop, the shop's gifted but under-appreciated bootmaker - who professes no such reciprocal feelings or desire. When the timid Will informs her he has already been bullied into an engagement to his landlady's daughter, Maggie promptly scuppers that, to his great relief. Maggie declares her intentions to her father and delivers her terms. Hobson attempts to intimidate Will by threatening to "beat the love out" of him with his belt. Will declares he has no love for Maggie, but if Hobson strikes him, he will stick to her like glue. Hobson does, and the couple walks out.

Maggie approaches Mrs Hepworth, a wealthy Hobson customer enamoured of Will's work, for a loan of £100 to start a shop with him. When asked about security, Maggie proudly proclaims it is Will. She rents a basement as both shop and living quarters, furnishes it, has Will outfit it for work, and arranges for their banns to be read. Back at Hobson's, she takes a common brass ring out of inventory and dons it as a symbol of her betrothal to Will, who has not offered her one.

Hobson feels Maggie's absence. Alice and Vicky prove both unwilling and unable to pick up the slack in the house or the shop. The night before the wedding, Hobson storms off to the Moonraker pub and gets drunk with his cronies, insulting one after the other. Stumbling home, he falls through a pavement trapdoor into the basement of Beenstock & Co., where he is found next day sleeping it off atop the shop's inventory, spilled out around him. Freddy Beenstock rushes to tell Maggie...who formulates a plan. When Hobson awakes, he is served with a writ for trespass and damage.

Maggie's sisters reluctantly attend Will and Maggie's wedding, fiancés in tow. The wedding dinner follows at the Mossops' home. Well after dark Hobson arrives to seek Maggie's advice regarding his legal woes. She manoeuvres him into negotiating with Albert Prosser, representing Beenstock & Co. Hobson reluctantly agrees to pay £500 to settle the matter out of court. Only then does he realise he has been "diddled": the money will be split between lawyer and client to replace the marriage settlements Hobson refused to provide for Alice and Vicky.

Will is apprehensive about his wedding night, but everything turns out well, and he emerges a changed man. With Maggie's business sense and Will's shoemaking skills, their business begins to thrive. Within a year, they have not only repaid Mrs Hepworth's loan, including the 20% interest, but have also won over nearly all of Hobson's high-class clientele. Under Maggie's guidance, the once meek and illiterate Will gradually becomes a confident businessman.

On New Year's Day, Hobson suffers delirium tremens. Dr MacFarlane diagnoses "chronic alcoholism," and demands total abstinence from drink. Maggie summons Will, Vicky and Alice to decide who will return home to look after their father. Both Vicky and Alice adamantly refuse to do so. With no alternative, Hobson demands Maggie come back on the old terms, Will and all, but Will will not settle for anything less than a 50-50 partnership, his name first on the sign, and Hobson relegated to silent partner. Hobson grudgingly accepts.

Will wants to change Maggie's brass wedding ring for a gold one, but she insists on keeping it – to remind them of their humble beginnings.

== Cast ==
- Charles Laughton as Henry Hobson
- John Mills as William Mossop
- Brenda de Banzie as Maggie Hobson
- Daphne Anderson as Alice Hobson
- Prunella Scales as Vicky Hobson
- Richard Wattis as Albert Prosser
- Derek Blomfield as Freddy Beenstock
- Helen Haye as Mrs Hepworth
- Joseph Tomelty as Jim Heeler
- Julien Mitchell as Sam Minns
- Gibb McLaughlin as Tudsbury
- Philip Stainton as Denton
- Dorothy Gordon as Ada Figgins
- Madge Brindley as Mrs Figgins
- John Laurie as Dr MacFarlane
- Raymond Huntley as Nathaniel Beenstock
- Jack Howarth as Tubby Wadlow
- Herbert C Walton as Printer

== Production ==
Robert Donat was originally cast in the role of Will Mossop but had to pull out due to his asthma. The outdoor location scenes were filmed around the Salford area, with Peel Park serving as the courting place for Maggie Hobson and William Mossop. Interiors were shot at Shepperton Studios near London with sets designed by the art director Wilfred Shingleton. It was Prunella Scales' second cinematic role.

== Soundtrack ==
Malcolm Arnold took the comical main theme for the film from his opera The Dancing Master. Throughout the film, it is linked to Hobson so often that he even whistles it at one point. Arnold wrote the score for a small pit orchestra of 22 players, and he enlisted the help of a Belgian cafe owner to play the musical saw for one pivotal scene. After a night of drinking at The Moonraker, Hobson is seeing double, and he fixates on the reflection of the moon in the puddles outside the pub. Arnold deploys the musical saw to represent the willowy allure of the moon and Hobson's intoxication, as the clumsy Hobson stamps from puddle to puddle, chasing its reflection.

== Reception ==
=== Box office ===
The film was one of the most popular at the British box office in 1954, with Kinematograph Weekly characterizing the film as a "money maker."

=== Critical ===
In his New York Times review, Bosley Crowther called Hobson's Choice "a delightful and rewarding British film", and praised the performances of the three leads and its producer/director. TV Guide gave the film four stars, characterising it as "a fully developed comedy of human foibles and follies with Laughton rendering a masterful, sly performance, beautifully supported by de Banzie and Mills." In the opinion of Daniel Etherington of Channel 4, the "character interactions between the couple and the old bugger of a dad are fascinating, funny and moving." His verdict is, "Displays the Lean mark of quality and sterling work from its leads. A gem."

=== Awards ===
The film won the Golden Bear at the 4th Berlin International Film Festival in 1954 and British Film Academy Award Best British Film 1955.

== Home media ==
Hobson's Choice is available on VHS (Warner Home Video in the UK), DVD (as part of The Criterion Collection), Blu-ray, and LaserDisc.
