= The Passionate Friends (1949 film) =

- Directed by: David Lean
- Written by: Eric Ambler; Stanley Haynes; David Lean; H. G. Wells
- Based on: The Passionate Friends; 1913 novel by H.G. Wells
- Produced by: Ronald Neame
- Starring: Ann Todd; Claude Rains; Trevor Howard
- Cinematography: Guy Green
- Edited by: Geoffrey Foot
- Music by: Richard Addinsell
- Production company: Cineguild Productions
- Distributed by: General Film Distributors
- Release date: 26 January 1949
- Running time: 91 minutes
- Country: United Kingdom
- Language: English
- Budget: £346,800
- Box office: £219,400

The Passionate Friends (also known as One Woman's Story) is a 1949 British romantic drama film directed by David Lean and starring Ann Todd, Claude Rains and Trevor Howard. It was written by Eric Ambler, Stanley Haynes and Lean, based on The Passionate Friends: A Novel (1913) by H. G. Wells. It describes a love triangle in which a woman cannot give up her affair with another man. The film was entered into the 1949 Cannes Film Festival.

== Plot ==
At the Hotel Splendide on a lake in Switzerland, the staff starts their day. Cut to Mary, seated in a luxury aircraft. Her voiceover recalls her excitement and delight at the first holiday with Howard for years.

She is half asleep when a man is shown into the adjoining room.

She remembers a New Year's party, 9 years before: We see that it is that same man, Steven. Driving home from the party, Mary remembers her affair with Steven and how much in love they were. She dreams of how she refused his proposal because she “wants to belong to herself.”

Howard goes to Germany and Italy on a business trip. Steven calls Mary. She goes to his apartment for lunch. The sun is setting as he recalls their love and they kiss. They begin an affair, not thinking about consequences.

Howard returns. They agree he should know. Meanwhile, Howard is preoccupied with a pair of theatre tickets that Mary left behind. He goes to the theatre and sees the seats are empty. Steven brings Mary home; Howard invites him in for a drink. Mary sees Howard's program. Steven tells Howard they have always been in love. Mary tells Steven to leave.

In the morning he receives a letter from Mary. He finds the Justin house full of trunks and dust sheets. He confronts Howard, who tells him he does not really know Mary. They are leaving for Washington. Mary confirms what Howard said and runs upstairs, weeping.

“That was 9 years ago,” Mary's voiceover returns, wondering what she would have done if she had known he was the man in the adjoining room at the Hotel Splendide.

They meet at breakfast. Steven has a half-day before returning to London. They go by boat and cable car to picnic on a mountain. Steven reveals that he has two children with his wife. Mary asks him if he is happy. Mixed expressions tell of regrets.

When they return from the mountain, Howard, who has arrived early, sees them disembarking together. As he goes to their suite, he notices the porter taking Steven's suitcase from the adjoining room and is filled with suspicion. His pride is further hurt when Mary rushes by him to the terrace, not realising he is there, to wave goodbye enthusiastically to Steven.

Howard storms out and soon files suit for divorce against her, alleging adultery.

Mary tries to warn Steven, but he is served with process in his wife's presence, wreaking havoc on his family life.

Mary decides she must save Steven and tells him that Howard has withdrawn the divorce.

She tells Howard that nothing happened in the Hotel Splendide. She knew nothing of the adjoining room. Howard tells her the divorce is not about that. He had not expected love but only affection and some loyalty. Instead he was given 'the love you'd give a dog, the kindness you'd show a beggar, and the loyalty of a bad servant'. He yells at Mary to get out, but quickly calms down and retracts what he said in genuine remorse, revealing that he has developed the type of romantic love for Mary that he has always disdained, but his back is turned and Mary has already left.

Mary runs into a London Underground station. Standing on a platform, she stares at the tracks, drawing dangerously close to the platform edge. Just as she is about to leap, someone catches her round the waist. It is Howard. She trembles and weeps as he holds her. They go home.

== Main cast ==
- Claude Rains as Howard Justin
- Ann Todd as Mary Justin
- Trevor Howard as Professor Steven Stratton
- Isabel Dean as Pat Stratton
- Betty Ann Davies as Miss Layton
- Arthur Howard as Smith the butler

== Production ==
The film was originally going to be directed by Ronald Neame, who arranged for Eric Ambler to write and produce. The three stars were to be Ann Todd, Marius Goring and Claude Rains. Prior to filming, however, Neame's partners in Cineguild, Stanley Haynes and David Lean, told Neame the script was poor and wanted it rewritten. Neame agreed, his confidence shaken. Filming was postponed while Ambler rewrote the script under the supervision of Lean and Haynes. Filming started under Neame's direction with only forty pages of the script written. It proceeded for a few days but was an unhappy experience asNeame says Ann Todd "played up" as she was unsure of her character. Filming was shut down to enable the script to be completed and David Lean would take over the film. Trevor Howard replaced Marius Goring. Lean and Todd, both married to other people, fell in love during filming, and left their spouses to get married. The conflict behind the scenes on the film contributed to the disintegration of Cineguild.

== Reception ==
=== Critical ===
The Monthly Film Bulletin wrote: "It is a pity that this glamorous film should have such a long-drawn-out opening; the flashback within a flashback makes for confusion, and the time lapse is therefore difficult to assess. The sets and settings are pleasant, but there are some strange incongruities."

Picture Show wrote: "This film version of the novel, which was first published in 1913, has been modernised and altered – but it is exquisitely acted and has some lovely settings. ... Ann Todd, beautifully photographed and gowned, gives a polished performance, while Claude Rains as the husband and Trevor Howard as the lover are sincere, compelling, and polished."

The film holds 75% positive reviews on Rotten Tomatoes.

=== Box office ===
The producer's receipts were £83,500 in the UK and £135,900 overseas. It lost money. According to Rank's own records the film incurred a loss of £127,400 for the company by December 1949.
