= David Lean =

English filmmaker and editor (1908–1991)

Sir David Lean CBE
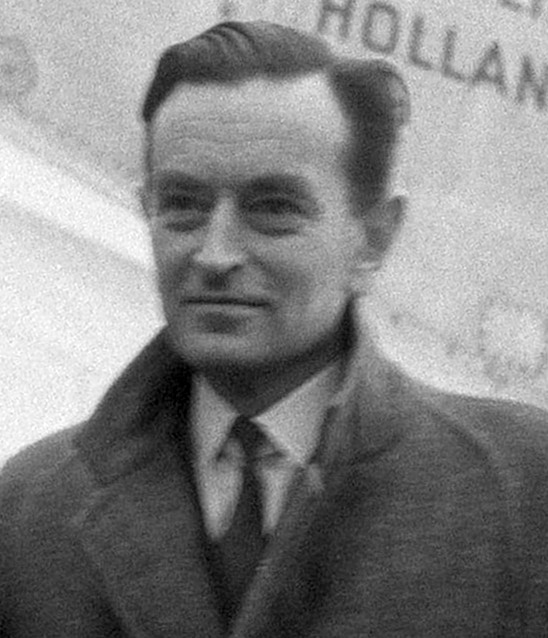
- Lean in 1952
- Born: 25 March 1908; Croydon, Surrey, England
- Died: 16 April 1991 (aged 83); Limehouse, London, England
- Resting place: Putney Vale Cemetery, London, England
- Occupations: Film director; film producer; screenwriter; film editor
- Years active: 1930–1991
- Spouses: Isabel Lean (m. 1930; div. 1936) Kay Walsh (m. 1940; div. 1949) Ann Todd (m. 1949; div. 1957) Leila Matkar (m. 1960; div. 1978) Sandra Hotz (m. 1981; div. 1984) Sandra Cooke (m. 1990)
- Children: 1

Sir David Lean (25 March 1908 – 16 April 1991) was an English filmmaker and editor, widely considered one of the most important figures of British cinema. He directed the large-scale epics The Bridge on the River Kwai (1957), Lawrence of Arabia (1962), Doctor Zhivago (1965), Ryan's Daughter (1970), and A Passage to India (1984). He also directed the film adaptations of Charles Dickens novels Great Expectations (1946) and Oliver Twist (1948), as well as the romantic drama Brief Encounter (1945).

Originally a film editor in the early 1930s, Lean made his directorial debut with 1942's In Which We Serve, which was the first of four collaborations with Noël Coward. Lean began to make internationally co-produced films financed by the big Hollywood studios, beginning with Summertime in 1955. The critical failure of his film Ryan's Daughter in 1970 led him to take a fourteen-year break from filmmaking, during which he planned a number of film projects which never came to fruition. In 1984, he had a career revival with A Passage to India, adapted from E. M. Forster's novel. This was a hit with critics, but it proved to be the last film that Lean directed.

Lean is described by film critic Michael Sragow as "a director's director, whose total mastery of filmcraft commands nothing less than awe among his peers". He has been lauded by many notable directors including Steven Spielberg and Stanley Kubrick. He was voted 9th greatest film director of all time in the British Film Institute Sight & Sound "Directors' Top Directors" poll in 2002. He was nominated seven times for the Academy Award for Best Director, which he won twice for The Bridge on the River Kwai and Lawrence of Arabia, and he has seven films in the British Film Institute's Top 100 British Films (three of which are in the top five) and was awarded the AFI Life Achievement Award in 1990.

== Early life and education ==
David Lean was born on 25 March 1908 at 38 Blenheim Crescent, South Croydon, Surrey (now part of Greater London), to Francis William le Blount Lean and the former Helena Tangye (niece of Sir Richard Trevithick Tangye). His parents were Quakers and he was a pupil at the Quaker-founded Leighton Park School in Reading. His younger brother, Edward Tangye Lean (1911–1974), founded the original Inklings literary club when a student at Oxford University. Lean was a half-hearted schoolboy with a dreamy nature who was labelled a "dud" of a student; he left school in the Christmas Term of 1926, at the age of 18, and entered his father's chartered accountancy firm as an apprentice.

A more formative event for his career than his formal education was an uncle's gift, when Lean was aged ten, of a Brownie box camera. "You usually didn't give a boy a camera until he was 16 or 17 in those days. It was a huge compliment and I succeeded at it." Lean printed and developed his films, and it was his "great hobby". In 1923, his father deserted the family. Lean later followed a similar path after his own first marriage and child.

== Career ==
=== Period as film editor ===
Bored by his work, Lean spent every evening in the cinema, and in 1927, after an aunt had advised him to find a job he enjoyed, he visited Gaumont Studios where his obvious enthusiasm earned him a month's trial without pay. He was taken on as a teaboy, promoted to clapperboy, and soon rose to the position of third assistant director. By 1930 he was working as an editor on newsreels, including those of Gaumont Pictures and Movietone, while his move to feature films began with Freedom of the Seas (1934) and Escape Me Never (1935).

He edited Gabriel Pascal's film productions of two George Bernard Shaw plays, Pygmalion (1938) and Major Barbara (1941). He edited Powell & Pressburger's 49th Parallel (1941) and One of Our Aircraft Is Missing (1942). After this last film, Lean began his directing career, after editing more than two dozen features by 1942. As Tony Sloman wrote in 1999, "As the varied likes of David Lean, Robert Wise, Terence Fisher and Dorothy Arzner have proved, the cutting rooms are easily the finest grounding for film direction." David Lean was given honorary membership of the Guild of British Film Editors in 1968.

=== British films ===
His first work as a director was in collaboration with Noël Coward on In Which We Serve (1942), and he later adapted several of Coward's plays into successful films. These films are This Happy Breed (1944), Blithe Spirit (1945) and Brief Encounter (1945) with Celia Johnson and Trevor Howard as quietly understated clandestine lovers, torn between their unpredictable passion and their respective orderly middle-class marriages in suburban England. The film shared Grand Prix honors at the 1946 Cannes film festival and garnered Lean his first Academy nominations for directing and screen adaptation, and Celia Johnson a nomination for Best Actress. It has since become a classic, one of the most highly regarded British films.

Two celebrated Charles Dickens adaptations followed – Great Expectations (1946) and Oliver Twist (1948). David Shipman wrote in The Story of Cinema: Volume Two (1984): "Of the other Dickens films, only Cukor's David Copperfield approaches the excellence of this pair, partly because his casting, too, was near perfect". These two films were the first directed by Lean to star Alec Guinness, whom Lean considered his "good luck charm". The actor's portrayal of Fagin was controversial at the time. The first screening in Berlin during February 1949 offended the surviving Jewish community and led to a riot. It caused problems too in New York, and after private screenings, was condemned by the Anti-Defamation League and the American Board of Rabbis. "To our surprise it was accused of being anti-Semitic", Lean wrote. "We made Fagin an outsize and, we hoped, an amusing Jewish villain." The terms of the production code meant that the film's release in the United States was delayed until July 1951 after cuts amounting to eight minutes.

The next film directed by Lean was The Passionate Friends (1949), an atypical Lean film, but one which marked his first occasion to work with Claude Rains, who played the husband of a woman (Ann Todd) torn between him and an old flame (Howard). The Passionate Friends was the first of three films to feature the actress Ann Todd, who became his third wife. Madeleine (1950), set in Victorian-era Glasgow is about an 1857 cause célèbre with Todd's lead character accused of murdering a former lover. "Once more", writes film critic David Thomson "Lean settles on the pressing need for propriety, but not before the film has put its characters and the audience through a wringer of contradictory feelings." The last of the films with Todd, The Sound Barrier (1952), has a screenplay by the playwright Terence Rattigan and was the first of his three films for Sir Alexander Korda's London Films. Hobson's Choice (1954), with Charles Laughton in the lead, was based on the play by Harold Brighouse.

=== International films ===
Summertime (1955) marked a new departure for Lean. It was partly American financed, although again made for Korda's London Films. The film features Katharine Hepburn in the lead role as a middle-aged American woman who has a romance while on holiday in Venice. It was shot entirely on location there. Although best known for his epics, Lean's personal favourite of all his films was Summertime, and Hepburn was his favourite actress.

He developed The Wind Cannot Read but could not come to terms with Alex Korda and the Rank Organisation.

==== For Columbia and Sam Spiegel ====
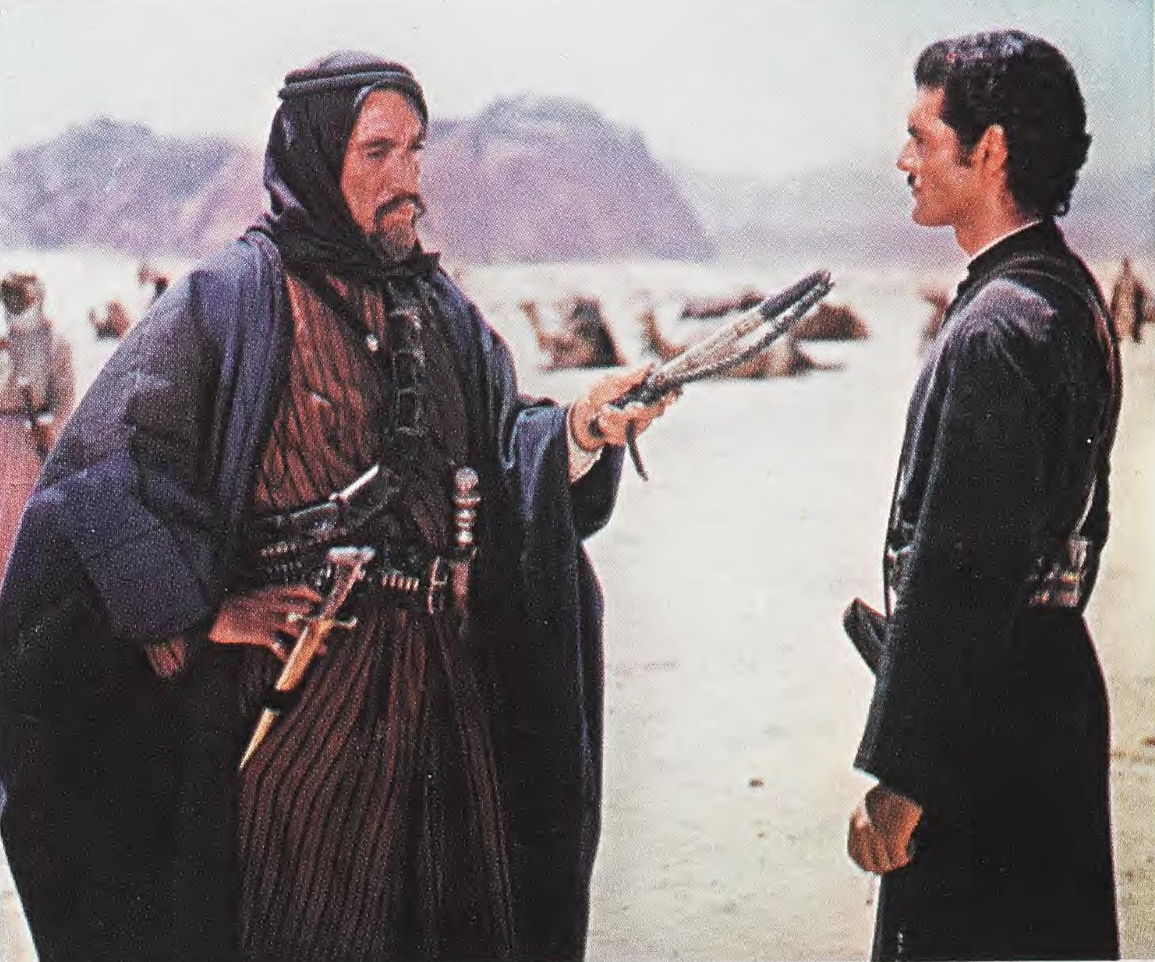
Anthony Quinn and Omar Sharif in Lean's Lawrence of Arabia (1962)

Lean's films now began to become infrequent but much larger in scale and more extensively released internationally. The Bridge on the River Kwai (1957) was based on a novel by Pierre Boulle recounting the story of British and American prisoners of war trying to survive in a Japanese prison camp during the Second World War. The film stars William Holden and Alec Guinness and became the highest-grossing film of 1957 in the United States. It won seven Academy Awards, including Best Picture, Best Director, and Best Actor for Alec Guinness, who had battled with Lean to give more depth to his role as an obsessively correct British commander who is determined to build the best possible bridge for his Japanese captors in Burma.

After extensive location work in the Middle East, North Africa, Spain, and elsewhere, Lean's Lawrence of Arabia was released in 1962. This was the first project of Lean's with a screenplay by playwright Robert Bolt, rewriting an original script by Michael Wilson (one of the two blacklisted writers of Bridge on the River Kwai). It recounts the life of T. E. Lawrence, the British officer who is depicted in the film as uniting the squabbling Bedouin peoples of the Arab peninsula to fight in World War I and then push on for independence.

After some hesitation, Alec Guinness appeared here in his fourth David Lean film as the Arab leader Prince Faisal, despite his misgivings from their conflicts on Bridge on the River Kwai. French composer Maurice Jarre, on his first Lean film, created a soaring film score with a famous theme and won his first Oscar for Best Original Score. The film turned actor Peter O'Toole, playing Lawrence, into an international star. Lean was nominated for ten Oscars, winning seven, including two for Best Director. Lean remains the only British director to win more than one Oscar for directing.

==== For MGM ====
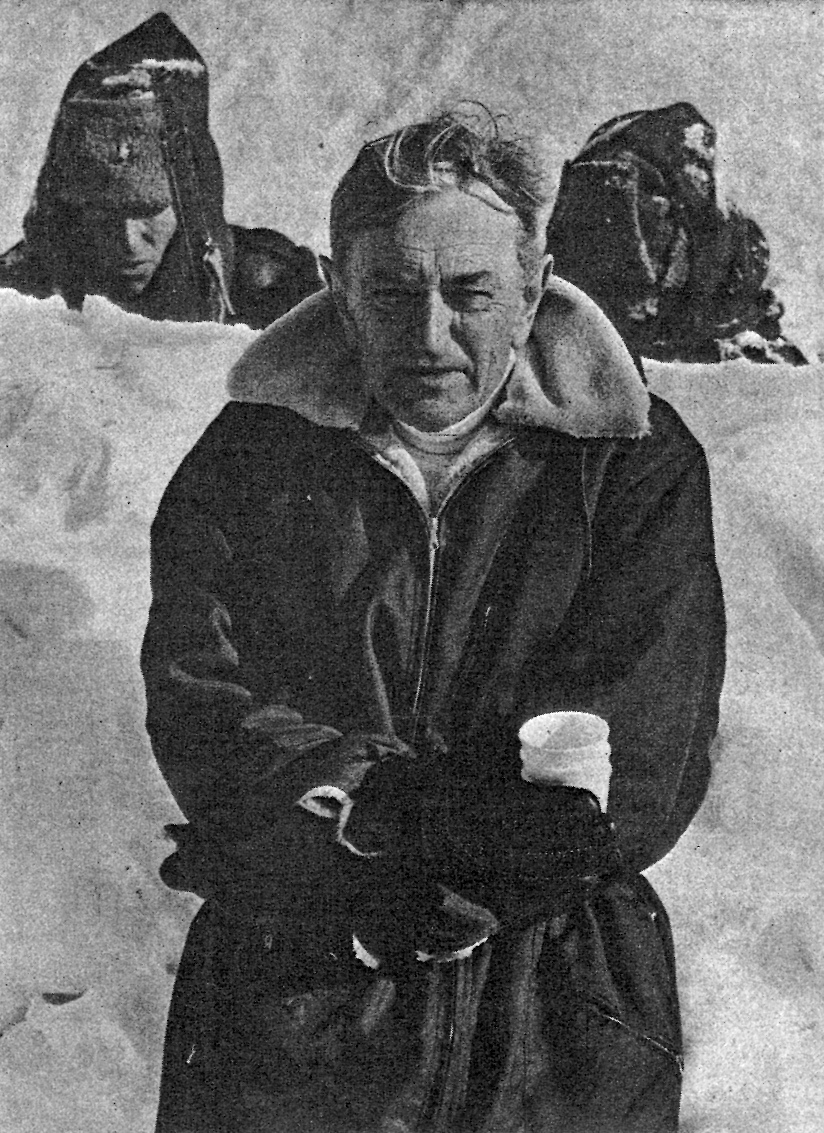
Lean in Northern Finland in 1965 while shooting Doctor Zhivago

Lean had his greatest box-office success with Doctor Zhivago (1965), a romance set during the Russian Revolution. The film, based on the Soviet suppressed novel by Nobel Prize-winning Russian poet Boris Pasternak, tells the story of a brilliant and warm-hearted physician and poet (Omar Sharif) who while seemingly happily married into the Russian aristocracy and a father falls in love with a beautiful abandoned young mother named Lara (Julie Christie) and struggles to be with her in the chaos of the Bolshevik revolution and subsequent Russian Civil War.

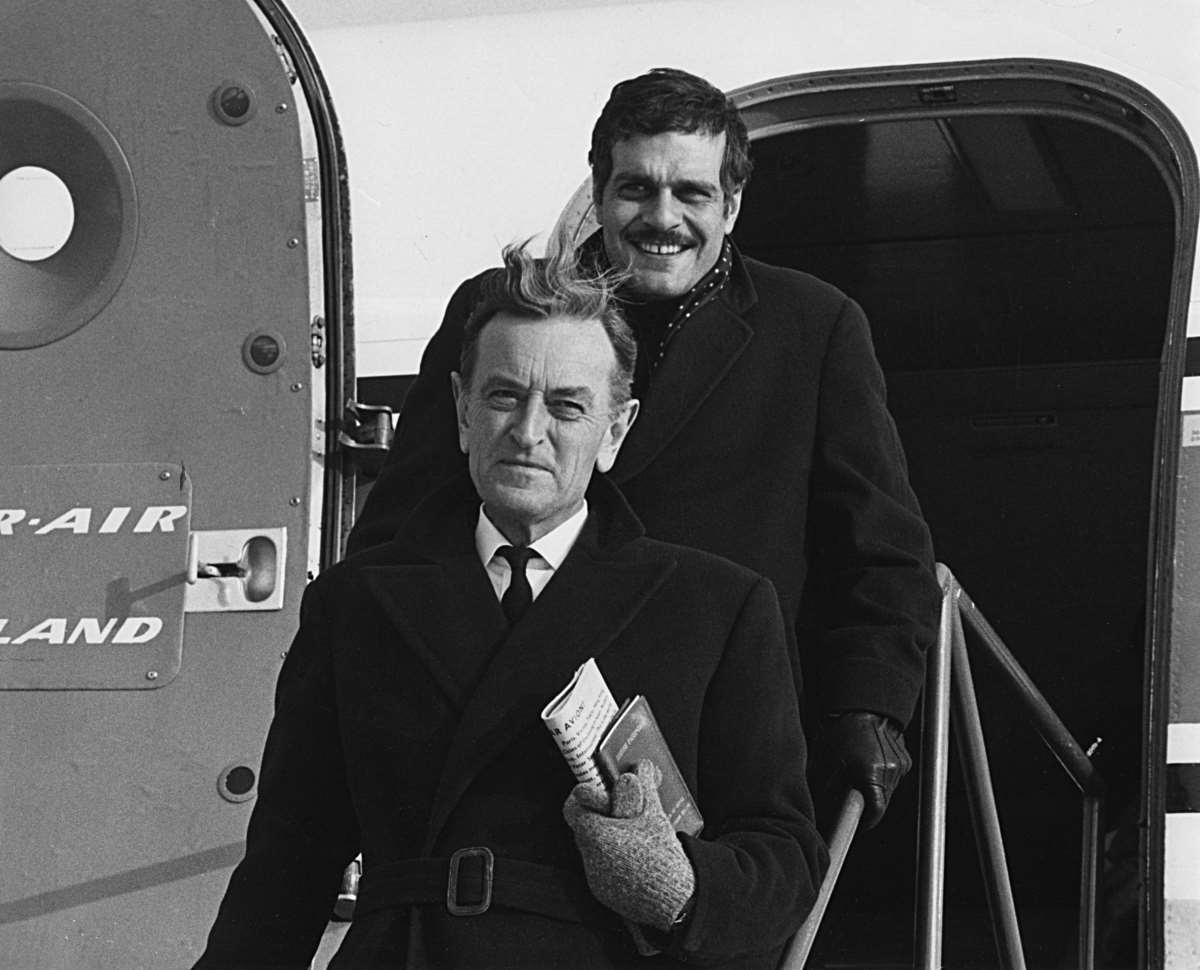
Lean and Omar Sharif arriving to Joensuu, Finland, to shoot Doctor Zhivago, March 1965

Initially, reviews for Doctor Zhivago were lukewarm, but some critics have since come to see it as one of Lean's best films, with film director Paul Greengrass calling it "one of the great masterpieces of cinema". As of 2020, it is the 9th highest-grossing film of all time, adjusted for inflation. Producer Carlo Ponti used Maurice Jarre's lush romantic score to create a pop tune called "Lara's Theme", which became an international hit song with lyrics under the title "Somewhere My Love", one of cinema's most successful theme songs. Freddie Young, the British director of photography, won an Academy Award for his colour cinematography. Around the same time, Lean also directed some scenes of The Greatest Story Ever Told (1965) while George Stevens was committed to location work in Nevada.

Lean's Ryan's Daughter (1970) was released after an extended period on location in Ireland. A doomed romance set against the backdrop of 1916 Ireland's struggles against the British, it is loosely based on Gustave Flaubert's Madame Bovary. Starring the aging Hollywood 'bad boy' Robert Mitchum in an uncharacteristic role as a long-suffering Irish husband and British actress Sarah Miles as his faithless young wife, the film received far fewer positive reviews than the director's previous work. It was particularly savaged by the New York critics, some of whom felt the film's massive visual scale on gorgeous Irish beaches and extended running time did not suit its small-scale romantic narrative. Nonetheless, the film was a box office success, earning $31 million and making it the 8th highest-grossing film of that year. It won two Academy Awards the following year, another for cinematographer Freddie Young and for supporting actor John Mills in his role as a village halfwit.

The poor critical reception of the film prompted Lean to meet with the National Society of Film Critics, gathered at the Algonquin Hotel in New York, including The New Yorker's Pauline Kael, and ask them why they objected to the movie. "I sensed trouble from the moment I sat down", Lean says of the now famous luncheon. Time critic Richard Schickel asked Lean point blank how he, the director of Brief Encounter, could have made "a piece of bullshit" like Ryan's Daughter. These critics so lacerated the film for two hours to David Lean's face that the devastated Lean was put off from making films for a long time. "They just took the film to bits", said Lean in a later television interview. "It really had such an awful effect on me for several years ... you begin to think that maybe they're right. Why on earth am I making films if I don't have to? It shakes one's confidence terribly."

=== Last years and unfulfilled projects ===
==== The Lawbreakers and The Long Arm ====
From 1977 until 1980, Lean and Robert Bolt worked on a film adaptation of Captain Bligh and Mr. Christian, a dramatized account by Richard Hough of the Mutiny on the Bounty. It was originally to be released as a two-part film, one named The Lawbreakers that dealt with the voyage out to Tahiti and the subsequent mutiny, and the second named The Long Arm that studied the journey of the mutineers after the mutiny as well as the admiralty's response in sending out the frigate HMS Pandora, in which some of the mutineers were imprisoned. Lean could not find financial backing for both films after Warner Bros. withdrew from the project; he decided to combine it into one and looked at a seven-part TV series before getting backing from Italian mogul Dino De Laurentiis. The project then suffered a further setback when Bolt suffered a serious stroke and was unable to continue writing; the director felt that Bolt's involvement would be crucial to the film's success. Melvyn Bragg ended up writing a considerable portion of the script.

Lean was forced to abandon the project after overseeing casting and the construction of the $4 million Bounty replica; at the last possible moment, actor Mel Gibson brought in his friend Roger Donaldson to direct the film, as producer De Laurentiis did not want to lose the millions he had already put into the project over what he thought was as insignificant a person as the director dropping out. The film was eventually released as The Bounty.

==== A Passage to India ====
Lean then embarked on a project he had pursued since 1960, a film adaptation of A Passage to India (1984), from E. M. Forster's 1924 novel of colonial conflicts in British-occupied India. Entirely shot on location in the sub-continent, this became his last completed film. He rejected a draft by Santha Rama Rau, responsible for the stage adaptation and Forster's preferred screenwriter, and wrote the script himself. In addition, Lean also edited the film with the result that his three roles in the production (writer, editor, director) were given equal status in the credits.

Lean recruited long-time collaborators for the cast and crew, including Maurice Jarre (who won another Academy Award for the score), Alec Guinness in his sixth and final role for Lean, as an eccentric Hindu Brahmin, and John Box, the production designer for Dr. Zhivago. Reversing the critical response to Ryan's Daughter, the film opened to universally enthusiastic reviews; the film was nominated for eleven Academy Awards and Lean himself nominated for three Academy Awards in directing, editing, and writing. His female star, in the complex role of a confused young British woman who falsely accuses an Indian man of attempted rape, gained Australian actress Judy Davis her first Academy nomination. Peggy Ashcroft, as the sensitive Mrs. Moore, won the Oscar for best supporting actress, making her, at 77, the oldest actress to win that award. According to Roger Ebert, it is "one of the greatest screen adaptations I have ever seen".

==== Empire of the Sun ====
He was signed on to direct a Warner Bros.–backed adaptation of J. G. Ballard's autobiographical novel Empire of the Sun after director Harold Becker left the project. Steven Spielberg was brought on board as a producer for Lean, but later assumed the role of director when Lean dropped out of the project; Spielberg was drawn to the idea of making the film due to his long-time admiration for Lean and his films. Empire of the Sun was released in 1987.

==== Nostromo ====
During the last years of his life, Lean was in pre-production of a film version of Joseph Conrad's Nostromo. He assembled an all-star cast, including Marlon Brando, Paul Scofield, Anthony Quinn, Peter O'Toole, Christopher Lambert, Isabella Rossellini and Dennis Quaid, with Georges Corraface as the title character. Lean also wanted Alec Guinness to play Dr. Monygham, but the aged actor turned him down in a letter from 1989: "I believe I would be disastrous casting. The only thing in the part I might have done well is the crippled crab-like walk." As with Empire of the Sun, Steven Spielberg came on board as producer with the backing of Warner Bros., but after several rewrites and disagreements on the script, he left the project and was replaced by Serge Silberman, a respected producer at Greenwich Film Productions.

The Nostromo project involved several writers, including Christopher Hampton and Robert Bolt, but their work was abandoned. In the end, Lean decided to write the film himself with the assistance of Maggie Unsworth (wife of cinematographer Geoffrey Unsworth), with whom he had worked on the scripts for Brief Encounter, Great Expectations, Oliver Twist, and The Passionate Friends. Originally Lean considered filming in Mexico but later decided to film in London and Madrid, partly to secure O'Toole, who had insisted he would take part only if the film was shot close to home. Nostromo had a total budget of $46 million and was six weeks away from filming at the time of Lean's death from throat cancer. It was rumoured that fellow film director John Boorman would take over direction, but the production collapsed. Nostromo was finally adapted for the small screen with an unrelated BBC television mini-series in 1997.

== Personal life ==
Lean was a long-term resident of Limehouse, East London.

His co-writer and producer, Norman Spencer, has said Lean was a "huge womaniser", and that "to my knowledge, he had almost 1,000 women". He was married six times, had one son, and at least two grandchildren—from all of whom he was completely estranged—and was divorced five times. He was survived by his last wife Sandra Cooke, art dealer and co-author (with Barry Chattington) of David Lean: An Intimate Portrait (2001), and by Peter Lean, his son from his first marriage.

His six wives were:

- Isabel Lean (28 June 1930 – 1936) (his first cousin); one son, Peter.
- Kay Walsh (23 November 1940 – 1949)
- Ann Todd (21 May 1949 – 1957)
- Leila Matkar (4 July 1960 – 1978) (from Hyderabad, India); Lean's longest-lasting marriage.
- Sandra Hotz (28 October 1981 – 1984)
- Sandra Cooke (15 December 1990 – 16 April 1991, Lean's death)

Lean died in Limehouse, London, on 16 April 1991, at the age of 83. He was buried at Putney Vale Cemetery.

== Honours ==
Lean was appointed Commander of the Order of the British Empire (CBE) in 1953, and was knighted for his contributions and services to the arts in 1984. Lean received the AFI Life Achievement Award in 1990. In 2012, Lean was among the British cultural icons selected by artist Sir Peter Blake to appear in a new version of his most famous artwork—the Beatles' Sgt. Pepper's Lonely Hearts Club Band album cover—celebrating the British cultural figures of his lifetime that he most admires.

In 1999, the British Film Institute compiled its list of the Top 100 British films. Seven of Lean's films appeared on the list:

- Brief Encounter (#2)
- Lawrence of Arabia (#3)
- Great Expectations (#5)
- The Bridge on the River Kwai (#11)
- Doctor Zhivago (#27)
- Oliver Twist (#46)
- In Which We Serve (#92)

In addition, on the American Film Institute's 1998 list of 100 Years...100 Movies, Lawrence of Arabia placed 5th, The Bridge on the River Kwai 13th, and Doctor Zhivago 39th. In the 2007 revised edition, Lawrence of Arabia placed 7th and The Bridge on the River Kwai placed 36th.

With five wins out of six nominations, Lean directed more films that won the Academy Award for Best Cinematography at the Oscars than any other director for: Great Expectations, The Bridge on the River Kwai, Lawrence of Arabia, Doctor Zhivago and Ryan's Daughter—the last nomination being for A Passage to India.

== Style ==
As Lean himself pointed out, his films are often admired by fellow directors as a showcase of the filmmaker's art. According to Katharyn Crabbe, "[t]he rewards of watching a David Lean film are most often described in terms of his skillful use of cinematic conventions, his editing, his alertness to the ability of film to create effects." In his introduction to David Lean: Interviews, Steven Organ claims that Lean "often straddl[ed] that fine line between commercialism and artistry. To view one of Lean's films is to see the complete spectrum of tools available to the filmmaker – and used to their fullest potential."

According to David Ehrenstein, "What all [his] brilliant, seemingly disparate works have in common is the clarity and precision of Lean's filmmaking technique, as well as his steely resolve in using it to attain poetic grandeur." Michael Sragow calls Lean "a superb romantic moviemaker and one of the slow but steady innovators of the cinema … Though Lean is usually praised for his 'film sense', as though it were divorced from his other faculties, he's done as much as men of the theater like Visconti to merge the illusions and grand passions of the stage with the verisimilitude and immediacy of the screen. His ability to combine factual filigree and larger-than-life characters in a sometimes hallucinatory atmosphere has inspired generations of filmmakers to try to fuse the most ruthless documentation with the most elaborate myth-making." He further highlights Lean's use of "highly charged staging and editing and a lucid, fluid realism to depict the contrast between ongoing life and life at its extremes."

On the occasion of Lean's centenary in 2008, writer and broadcaster Andrew Collins praised him as "more than just cinema's great choreographer of scale":

Certainly, he set the bar high for heavily populated, location-shot period sagas from literary sources, but it would be shortsighted to see Lean's greatest achievements as the filmic equivalent of skyscraping architectural edifices: good because they're there. The people may look like ants when first glimpsed against the vast sand dunes of an exacting Lean composition, or the icy Russian mountains, or the concrete façade of a dam, but we are soon invited to alight on individuals, and through the use of simple, visual clues, wonder about them and care about them.

Alain Silver analyses Lean's technique as "one that elucidates story and characters through pictures." He states that Lean is able to subjectify a film's perspective through visuals regardless of whether the film has a "third-person" or "first-person" narrative:

Since most of Lean's narratives are organised in a way which is neither "first" nor "third" person, shots or sequences […] may suddenly shift the film into either mode without disrupting or overwhelming the basic structure. Subjectivity might be accomplished in several ways. The narrative itself may be literally bracketed by being presented as a flashback from either the central character (Brief Encounter, The Passionate Friends), a subordinate one (Doctor Zhivago), or a combination (In Which We Serve and, implicitly, Lawrence of Arabia). In any narrative context, shots may be intercut to suggest the thoughts or sensations of a character, as in Oliver Twist and Brief Encounter, or characters, as in the sparking streetcar terminal when Zhivago and his still-unknown future love, Lara, brush against each other early in that film. Shots may become literally what the character sees; or shots of the character may be manipulated to focus on an interior state. Simple instances would be the hanging in Great Expectations (1946) or the Cossack charge in Doctor Zhivago, where there is no point-of-view shot of the terrible event but merely a slow move in to reveal the horror on the actors' faces.

Lean was notorious for his perfectionist approach to filmmaking; director Claude Chabrol stated that he and Lean were the only directors working at the time who were prepared to wait "forever" for the perfect sunset, but whereas Chabrol measured "forever" in terms of days, Lean did so in terms of months. Similarly, Hugh Hudson, writing shortly after Lean's death in 1991, called him "[a] man driven to achieve the perfect realisation of his ideas and ruthless in that pursuit." He goes on to describe the filmmaker's method of working with actors:

Lean always had a clear idea of how his characters should be portrayed and would not accept much deviation. He had a reputation for being tough with his actors and for refusing to let them indulge in "their natural propensity for histrionics". Yet once the rules were laid down, Lean allowed his actors considerable space for interpretation and he showed a genuine understanding of their exposed position in front of the camera … Lean would set his actors in the landscape by giving them the feeling of being in that time and at that place. This is where the talent of a great director comes in—setting a scene (mise-en-scène), creating a climate, painting a picture within the story and at the same time never losing the telling of that story.

=== Themes ===
Steven Ross has written that Lean's films "reveal a consistently tragic vision of the romantic sensibility attempting to reach beyond the constraints and restrictions of everyday life", and that they tend to feature "intimate stories of a closely-knit group of characters [whose] fates are indirectly but powerfully shaped by history-shaking events going on around them." He further observes that, in his work, "setting [is used] as a presence with as much dramatic and thematic form as any character in the film." Similarly, Lean biographer Gene D. Phillips writes that the director "saw in his style an attraction to characters who refuse to accept defeat, even when their most cherished hopes go unfulfilled. His protagonists seek to transform their lives, but often fail to do so. Pip in Great Expectations, Colonel Nicholson in The Bridge on the River Kwai, and T. E. Lawrence in Lawrence of Arabia, among others, struggle against the limitations of their own personalities to achieve a level of existence that they deem higher or nobler."

According to Silver, "Lean's signature characters are ordinary dreamers and epic visionaries, people who want to transform the world according to their expectations... The tragic flaw in Lean's characters is a self-centeredness which can lead to misimpression, which can prevent them from seeing what is so clear to everyone else." In Sragow's view, Lean has "depicted the need for constricted modern men and women either to act out their dreams or preserve the life they have by making a scene or putting on a show―indulging in the histrionic to renew their sense of self and purpose."

Michael Newton of The Guardian, analysing Brief Encounter and Doctor Zhivago, says:

Today, 50 years on, we can see how the scale of Zhivago forms the measure of its appeal, and its gorgeousness seems intrinsic to one of cinema's virtues. With Charlie Chaplin, Alfred Hitchcock and Michael Powell, Lean is one of the greatest film directors this country has produced. Like all of them, he is a romantic, and romanticism was his subject matter: the flourishing and the breaking of inordinate desires, the dangerous lure of beauty, of adventure and the untrammelled life. Both films demonstrate the impossibility of an illicit love finding a place in the world. In Brief Encounter, social convention and decency prevent it; romance flourishes only to be worn out by the talk of casual acquaintances. In Doctor Zhivago, it is history and the political realm that prove to be love's enemy.

Hudson considers the director an important chronicler of the British character in the 20th century:

Born in the Edwardian era, Lean experienced first-hand the decline of the British Empire. He lived through two world wars and matured as an artist during the 50s, when Britain was being forced to re-examine her new role. His natural taste was for a mixture of the nineteenth-century novel and landscape painting of the same period – something he never tried, nor wanted, to change. But having grown up during the demise of British influence in the world, he also had an acutely critical view of British society. So Lean's work contains an interesting paradox: the strong visual and literary legacy of British culture, which he loved and understood so well, combined with biting insights into the ludicrous aspects of a nation being forced to accept a less important role in the world. A perfect example of this ability to illustrate Britain's dilemma is the portrayal of the colonel in The Bridge on the River Kwai (1957). Here is a man using the military discipline that was the result of hundreds of years of British tradition to survive the hardships, torture and degradation of being a Japanese prisoner of war, yet whose addiction to that same discipline and tradition has turned him mad. The man is both a hero and a fool – a remarkable device to illustrate the state of Britain as she clung to meaningless tradition in a futile attempt to save her identity in the face of declining power.

Several critics have found a close relationship between style and theme in Lean's work. John Orr, author of Romantics and Modernists in British Cinema, examines Lean in terms of "the stylised oscillation of romance and restraint that shapes so much of his work", as well as of "the intersection of culture and nature, where a story's momentous events are not only framed against landscape settings but also integrated into the very texture of the image that his camera produces." He argues that "Lean could have given us kitsch, syrupy imitations of landscape photography, but his staging and cutting blend so fluently that his evocation of the romantic sublime is linked, inextricably, to his découpage and sense of place." In The Rough Guide to Film, Tom Charity argues: "It's in the cutting that you feel both the romantic ardour and the repression that create the central tension in [Lean's] work."

== Legacy ==
Several of the many other later directors who have acknowledged significant influence by Lean include Hugh Hudson, Michael Cimino, Jean-Jacques Annaud, Peter Weir, Ridley Scott, Stanley Kubrick, George Lucas, Spike Lee, Sergio Leone, Sir John Boorman, Lawrence Kasdan and Brian De Palma. John Woo once named Lawrence of Arabia among his top three films.

The critical verdict was not unanimous, however. For example, David Thomson, writing about Lean in his New Biographical Dictionary of Film, comments:

From 1952 to 1991, he made eight films—and in only one of them, I suggest —Lawrence—is the spectacle sufficient to mask the hollow rhetoric of the scripts. But Lean before 1952 made eight films in ten years that are lively, stirring, and an inspiration—they make you want to go out and make movies, they are so in love with the screen's power and the combustion in editing."

The New York Times film critic Bosley Crowther dismissed Lawrence of Arabia as "a huge, thundering camel-opera that tends to run down rather badly as it rolls on into its third hour and gets involved with sullen disillusion and political deceit". Writing in The Village Voice, Andrew Sarris remarked that Lawrence was "simply another expensive mirage, dull, overlong, and coldly impersonal ... on the whole I find it hatefully calculating and condescending".

== Filmography ==
Directed features
Year	Title	Studio
1942	In Which We Serve	British Lion Films
1944	This Happy Breed	Eagle-Lion Films
1945	Blithe Spirit	General Film Distributors
1945	Brief Encounter	Eagle-Lion Films
1946	Great Expectations	General Film Distributors
1948	Oliver Twist	General Film Distributors
1949	The Passionate Friends	General Film Distributors
1950	Madeleine	The Rank Organization
1952	The Sound Barrier	British Lion Films
1954	Hobson's Choice	British Lion Films / United Artists
1955	Summertime	United Artists
1957	The Bridge on the River Kwai	Columbia Pictures
1962	Lawrence of Arabia	Columbia Pictures
1965	Doctor Zhivago	Metro-Goldwyn-Mayer
1970	Ryan's Daughter	Metro-Goldwyn-Mayer
1984	A Passage to India	Columbia Pictures / EMI Films

== Award and nominations ==
Awards and nominations received by Lean's films

Year	Title	Academy Awards		BAFTA Awards		Golden Globe Awards	
Year	Title	Nominations	Wins	Nominations	Wins	Nominations	Wins
1942	In Which We Serve	3	1				
1945	Blithe Spirit	1	1				
1945	Brief Encounter	3					
1946	Great Expectations	5	2				
1948	Oliver Twist			1			
1952	The Sound Barrier	2	1	5	3		
1954	Hobson's Choice			5	1		
1955	Summertime	2		2			
1957	The Bridge on the River Kwai	8	7	4	4	4	3
1962	Lawrence of Arabia	10	7	5	4	8	6
1965	Doctor Zhivago	10	5	3		6	5
1970	Ryan's Daughter	4	2	10		3	1
1984	A Passage to India	11	2	9	1	5	3
Total		59	28	44	13	26	18

Directed Academy Award Performances

Year	Performer	Film	Result
Academy Award for Best Actor
1958	Alec Guinness	The Bridge on the River Kwai	Won
1963	Peter O'Toole	Lawrence of Arabia	Nominated
Academy Award for Best Supporting Actor
1958	Sessue Hayakawa	The Bridge on the River Kwai	Nominated
1963	Omar Sharif	Lawrence of Arabia	Nominated
1966	Tom Courtenay	Doctor Zhivago	Nominated
1971	John Mills	Ryan's Daughter	Won
Academy Award for Best Actress
1946	Celia Johnson	Brief Encounter	Nominated
1956	Katharine Hepburn	Summertime	Nominated
1971	Sarah Miles	Ryan's Daughter	Nominated
1985	Judy Davis	A Passage to India	Nominated
Academy Award for Best Supporting Actress
1985	Peggy Ashcroft	A Passage to India	Won

== See also ==
- List of British film directors
- List of Academy Award winners and nominees from Great Britain
- List of Golden Globe winners

== Works cited ==
- Brownlow, Kevin (15 August 1996). David Lean: A Biography. Macmillan. ISBN 978-0-312-14578-1.
- "Sir David Lean – Obituary". The Daily Telegraph. 17 April 1991. Archived from the original on 3 July 2011. Unsigned obituary of Lean.
- Lane, Anthony (31 March 2008). "Master and Commander: Remembering David Lean". The New Yorker. Lane's appreciation of Lean on his centennial.
- Morris, L. Robert and Lawrence Raskin, Lawrence of Arabia: the 30th Anniversary Pictorial History, Anchor Books, Doubleday, 1992.
- Phillips, Gene (24 November 2006). Beyond the Epic: The Life and Films of David Lean. University Press of Kentucky. ISBN 978-0-8131-7155-5.
- Santas, Constantine (2012). The Epic Films of David Lean. Scarecrow Press. ISBN 978-0-8108-8210-2.
- Shipman, David (1984). The Story of Cinema: From Citizen Kane to the present day. Hodder and Stoughton. ISBN 978-0-340-28259-5.
- Alain Silver and James Ursini, David Lean and his Films, Silman-James, 1992.
- Silver, Alain (February 2004). "David Lean". Senses of Cinema (30). Silver's essay on Lean's career compiled as part of the Senses of Cinema Great Directors series.
- Silverman, Stephen M., David Lean, Harry N. Abrams, 1989.
- Thomson, David (9 May 2008). "Unhealed wounds". Thomson's appreciation of Lean on the occasion of his centennial.
- Turner, Adrian. Robert Bolt: Scenes from Two Lives, Hutchinson, London, 1998.
- Turner, Adrian. The Making of David Lean's Lawrence of Arabia, Dragon's World, Limpsfield, UK, 1994.
- Williams, Melanie, David Lean, Manchester University Press, 2014.

Preceded by Richard Attenborough, CBE	NFTS Honorary Fellowship	Succeeded by Nick Park, CBE
