= Eduard Spelterini =

Swiss pioneer of ballooning and of aerial photography

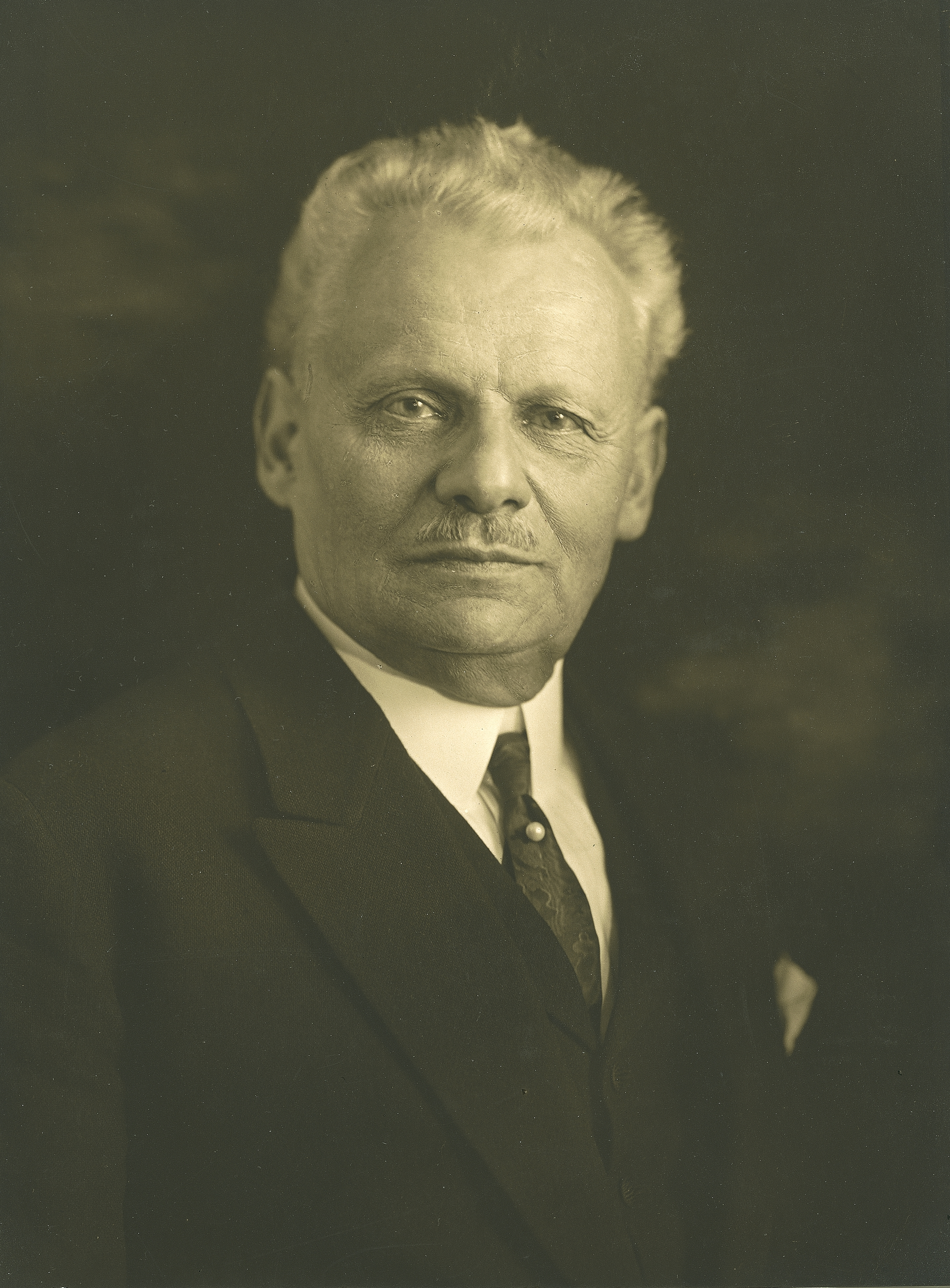
- ETH-Bibliothek Zürich, Bildarchiv
- Born: Eduard Schweizer; 2 June 1852; Bazenheid, Canton of St. Gallen, Switzerland
- Died: 16 June 1931 (aged 79)

Eduard Spelterini (2 June 1852 – 16 June 1931) was a Swiss pioneer of ballooning and of aerial photography.

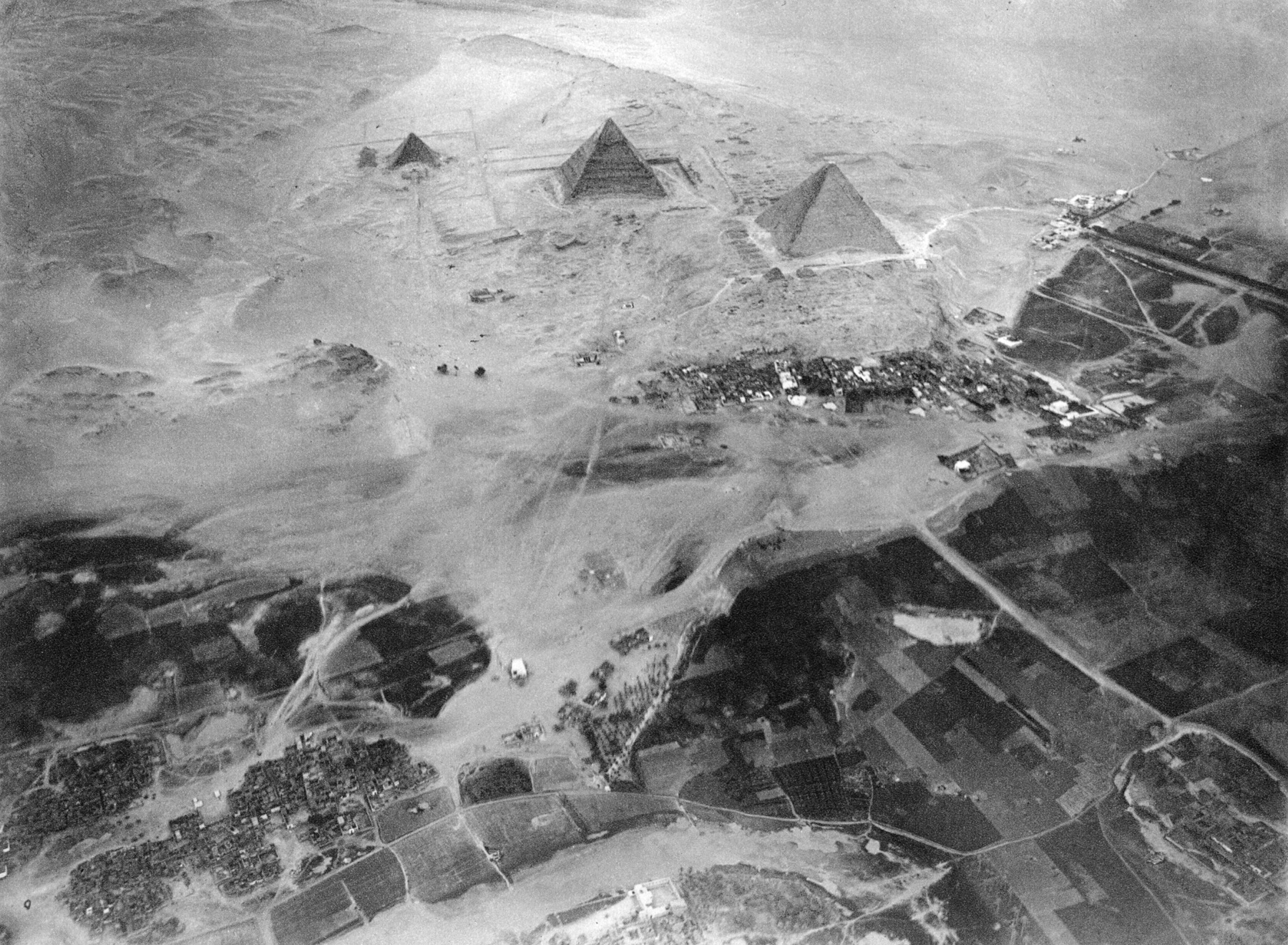
The Giza Necropolis, a photograph by Eduard Spelterini, 21 November 1904

== Early life ==
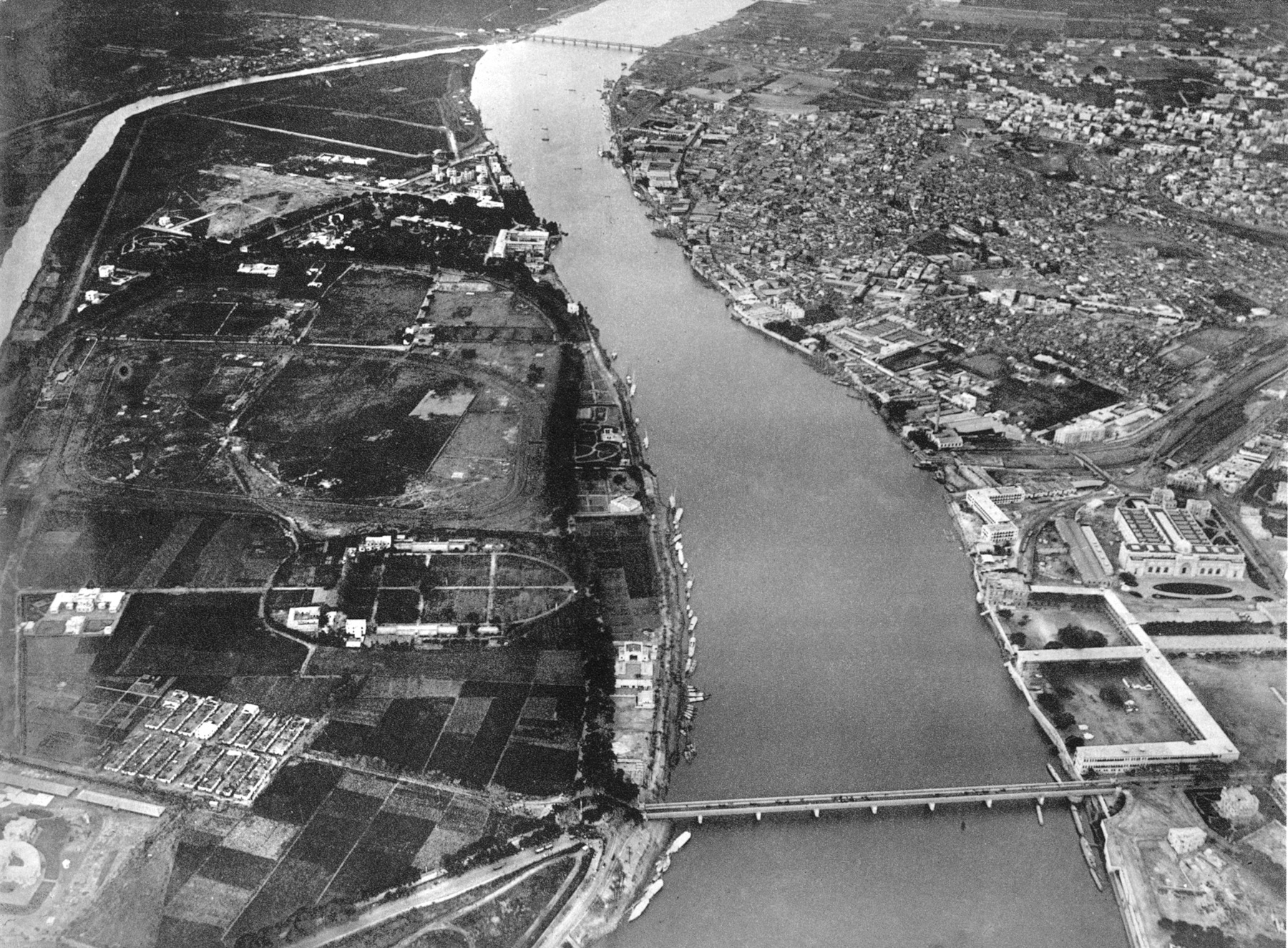
Aerial view for Nile River where the Egyptian Museum and the British barracks appear to the lower right side.

Spelterini was born in Bazenheid (now part of Kirchberg) in the Toggenburg area of the Canton of St. Gallen in Switzerland as Eduard Schweizer. His father, Sigmund Schweizer, was an innkeeper. When he was eight years old, the family reportedly moved to northern Italy, to a place near the Swiss-Italian border in the province of Como. Eduard is said to have attended the schools in Lugano. At the age of eighteen, Eduard allegedly went first to Milan and then to Paris to be trained as an opera singer. During this time, he chose the name "Spelterini", because to him it sounded fancier than "Schweizer". His singing career was cut short by a severe case of pneumonia.

In any case, Spelterini turned up in the mid-1870s in Paris, and in 1877 he was licensed by the Académie d'Aérostation météorologique de France as a balloon pilot.

== Ascents around the world ==
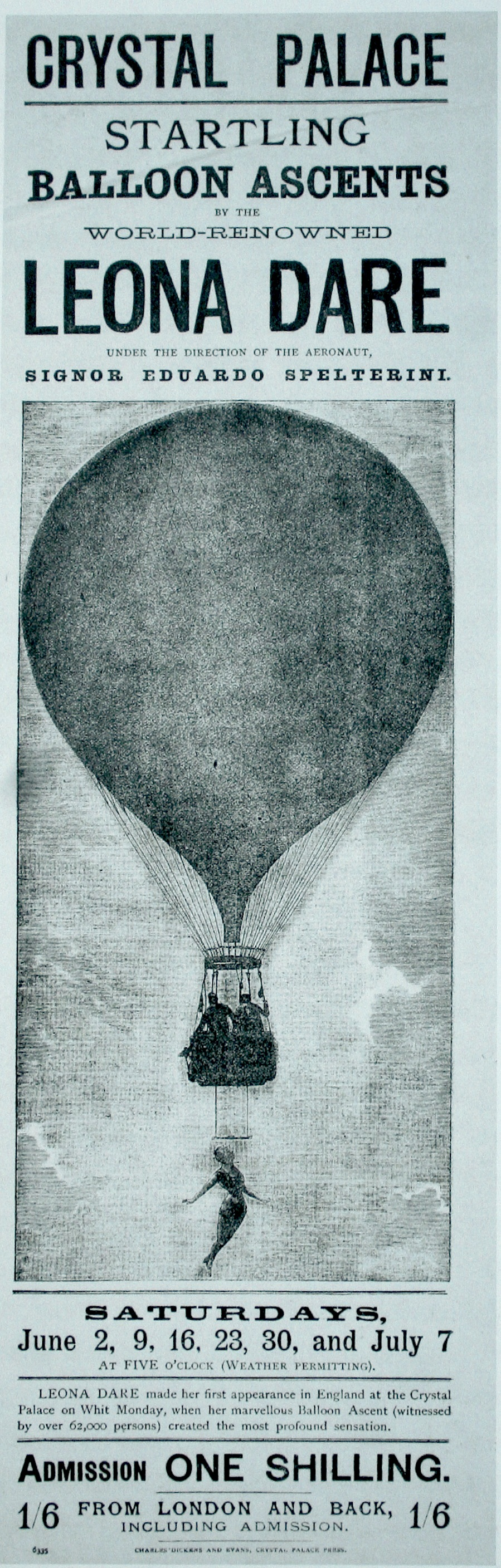
Announcement of Spelterini's ascents with Leona Dare

In the 1880s, after having successfully made 17 ascents by himself, Spelterini began to offer commercial rides with passengers. In 1887, he had his first own balloon made by the Surcouf company in Paris, a gas balloon with a volume of 1,500 cubic meters, which he named "Urania". The first voyage with this balloon was on 5 October 1887, starting in Vienna. Subsequently, Spelterini moved to the United Kingdom, where he performed together with an American aerial acrobat going by the name of Leona Dare, who would perform acrobatic acts suspended under the basket of Spelterini's balloon during the flights. The spectacle, but also Spelterini's often taking journalists for a ride for free, ensured them favourable publicity. Together, they toured eastwards through Europe until Moscow, where they parted. Spelterini turned southwards, making ascents in Bucharest, Saloniki, and Athens, before moving to Cairo. After his ascents in spring 1890 over the pyramids of Giza, he continued touring, first to Naples, then to Istanbul.

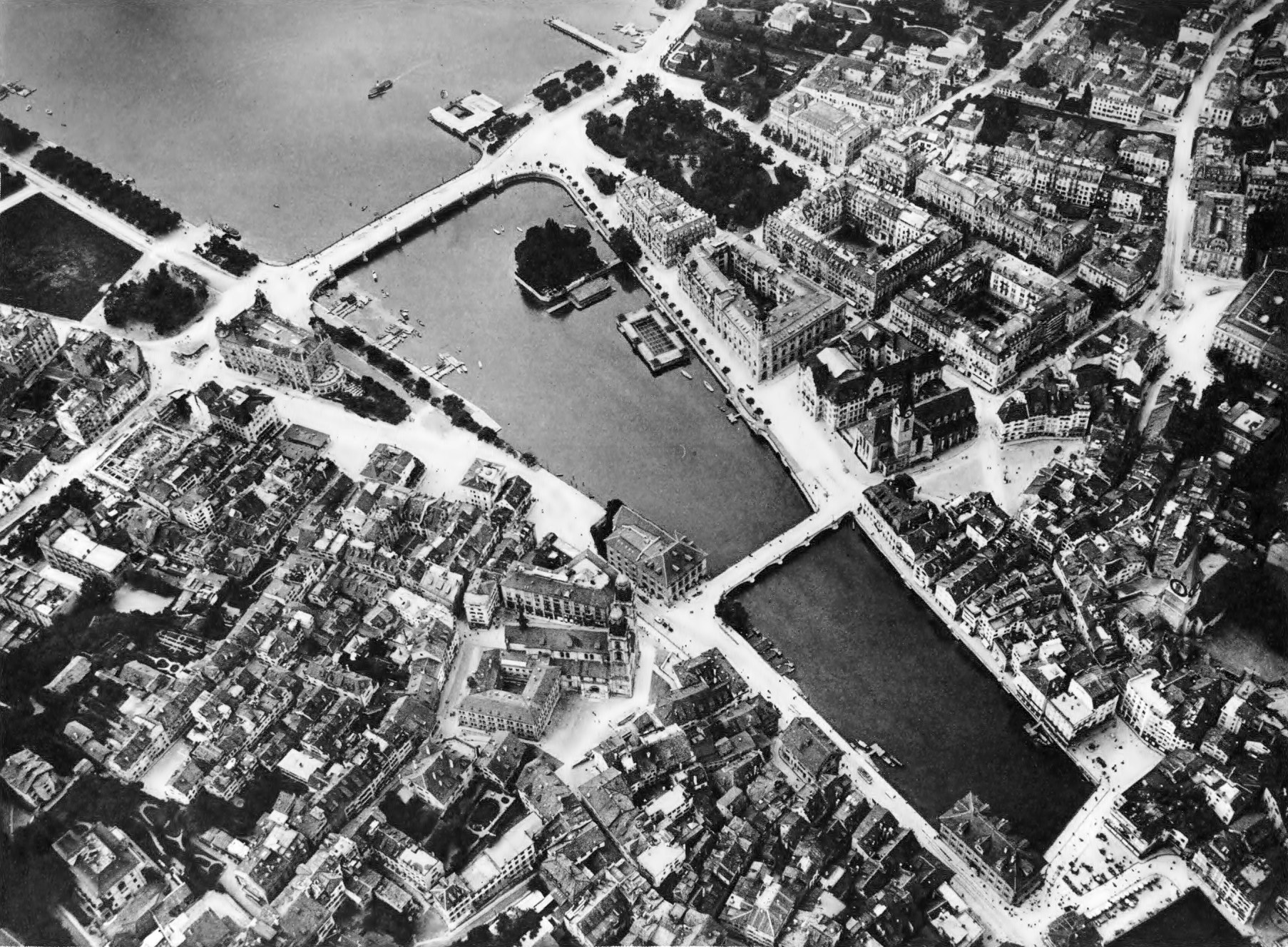
Limmatquai and Quaianlagen in Zürich: Bellevueplatz and Bürkliplatz, Quaibrücke, Münsterbrücke and Münsterhof, and Rathausbrücke–Weinplatz, probably mid-1890s.

In 1891, Spelterini returned to Switzerland. By that time, he was famous for his ballooning adventures. On 26 July 1891, Spelterini made his first ascent in Switzerland, starting at the Heimplatz in Zurich. The initial skepticism of the people vanished quickly, and his starts soon attracted crowds wherever he turned up: Zurich, Winterthur, St. Gall, Interlaken, Vevey, ... His endeavours also caught the attention of scientists. On various occasions, Spelterini made ascents with scientists solely for the purpose of conducting experiments: with physicists to study the atmosphere, with physicians to study human blood cells at low atmospheric pressure, with geologists to study the Earth from above.

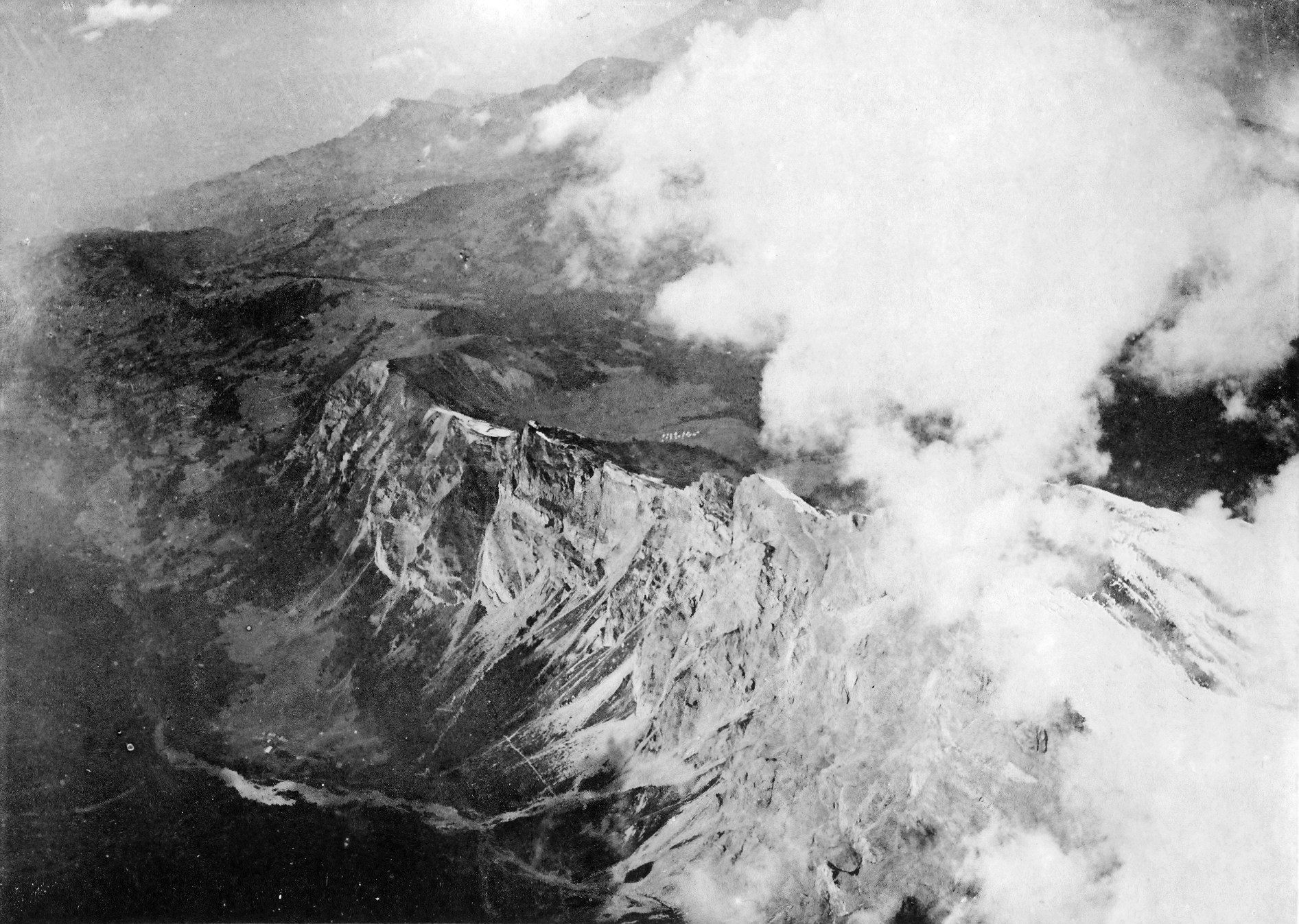
A view of Les Diablerets from the balloon "Wega" on 3 October 1898 at 11:40 local time.

Geologist Albert Heim had once proposed to Spelterini to try crossing the Alps by balloon. But he needed a larger balloon for such an endeavour. With the help of sponsors, he was able to buy the "Wega" with a volume of 3,260 cubic meters, twice as much as the volume of "Urania". With it, Heim and Spelterini planned to travel from Sion in the Valais across Uri into the Grisons. But the winds decided otherwise. Despite unfavourable wind conditions, they started on 3 October 1898. The winds drove the balloon across Les Diablerets and then further westwards, across Lake Neuchatel and the Jura Mountains, until they descended near Besançon in France. Much of the trip was made at altitudes between 5000 and 6000 meters above sea level.

In the following years, Spelterini crossed the Alps numerous times with his balloons, in all directions. In 1904, he spent several months in Egypt, and in 1911, he even travelled to South Africa, yet he returned each time to Switzerland.

== Aerial photography ==
Around 1893, Spelterini had begun to take a camera aboard his balloon and started to take pictures on his flights. It was certainly not easy to photograph with this equipment, weighing between 40 and 60 kilograms, and with a minimum exposure time of 1/30th of a second. But Spelterini brought back stunning photographs of the landscape seen from above that won awards repeatedly at aeronautical expositions in Milan, Paris, Brussels, or Frankfurt. For Albert Heim, his photos provided whole new insights into the relief of the Alps. Spelterini presented his photos in slide shows wherever he went, from Stockholm to Cape Town, fascinating his audiences and winning the general acclaim of the press, who reviewed his presentations favorably.

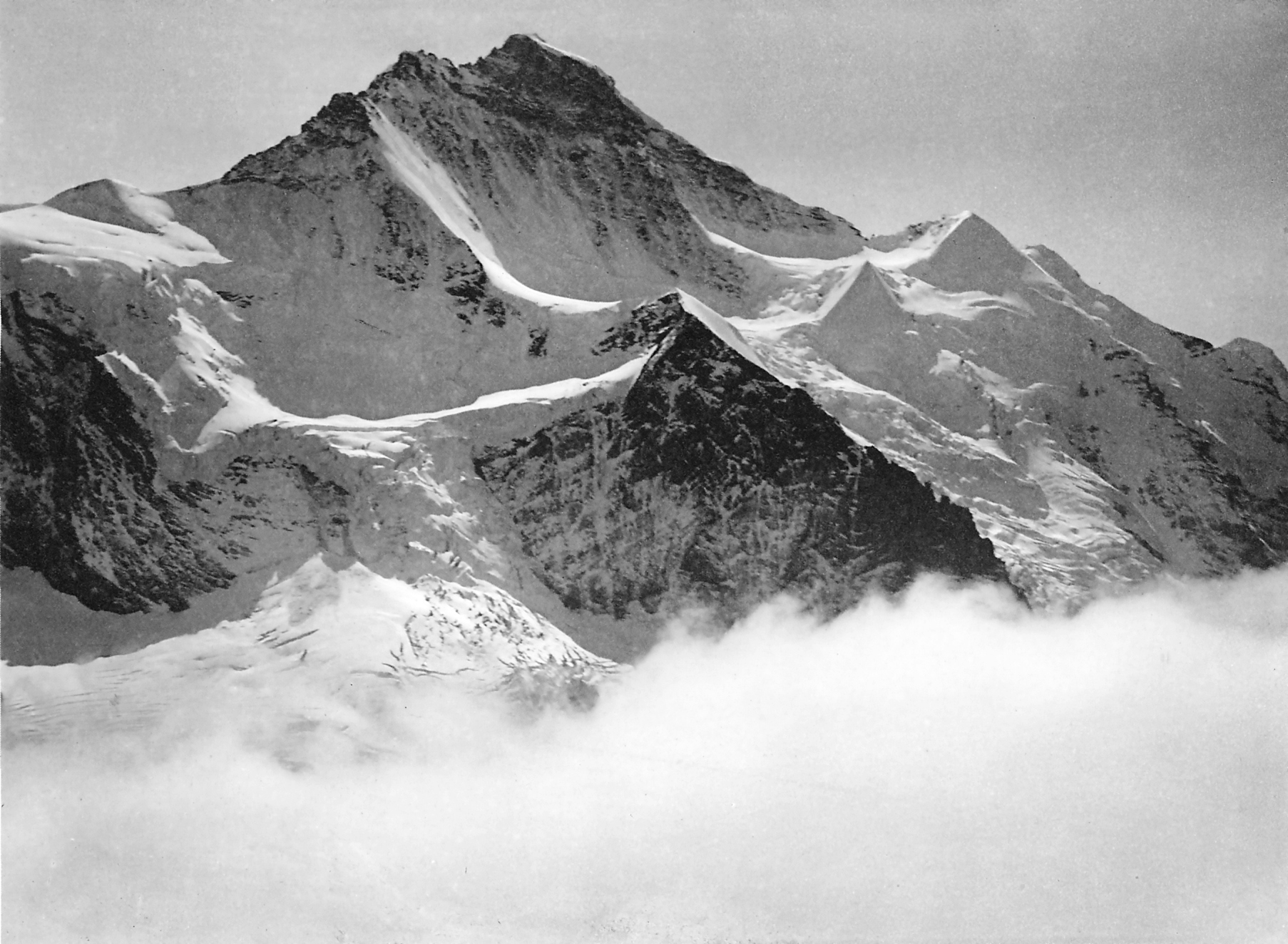
The north face of the Jungfrau, 20 September 1904.

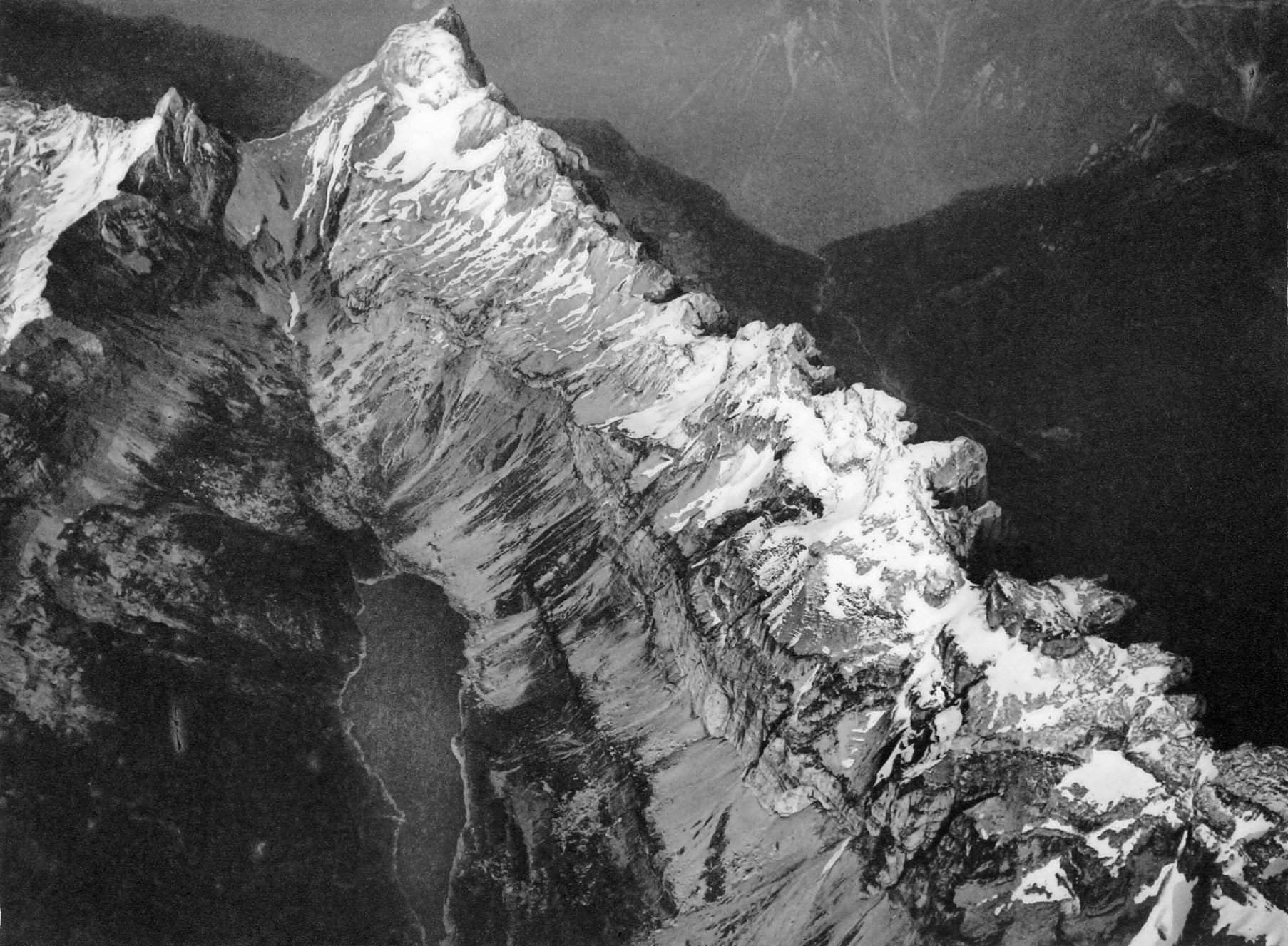
The Ortstock and lake Glattalp, 29 August 1912.

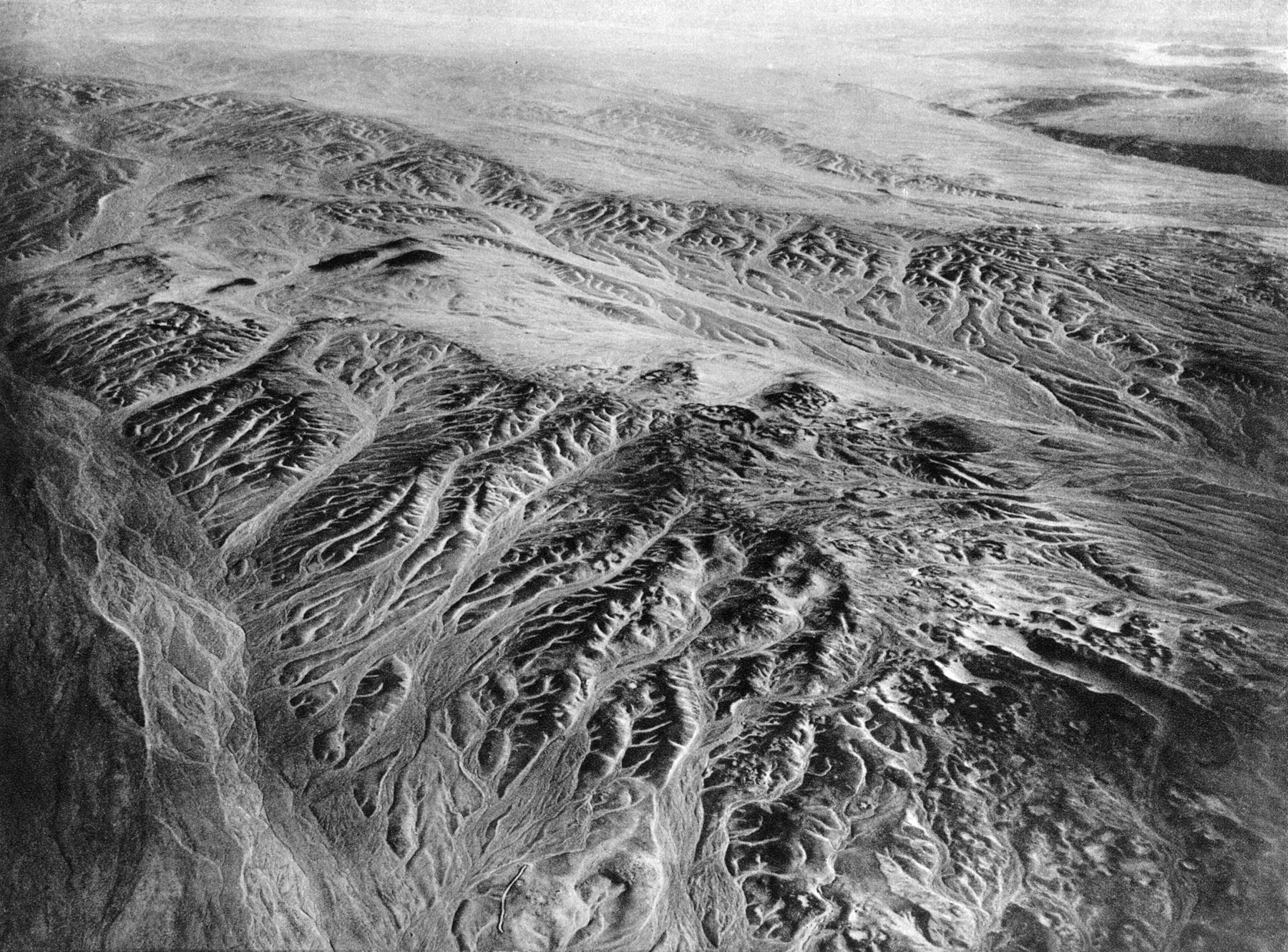
Desert south-east of Cairo, 31 January 1904.

== Decline of ballooning ==
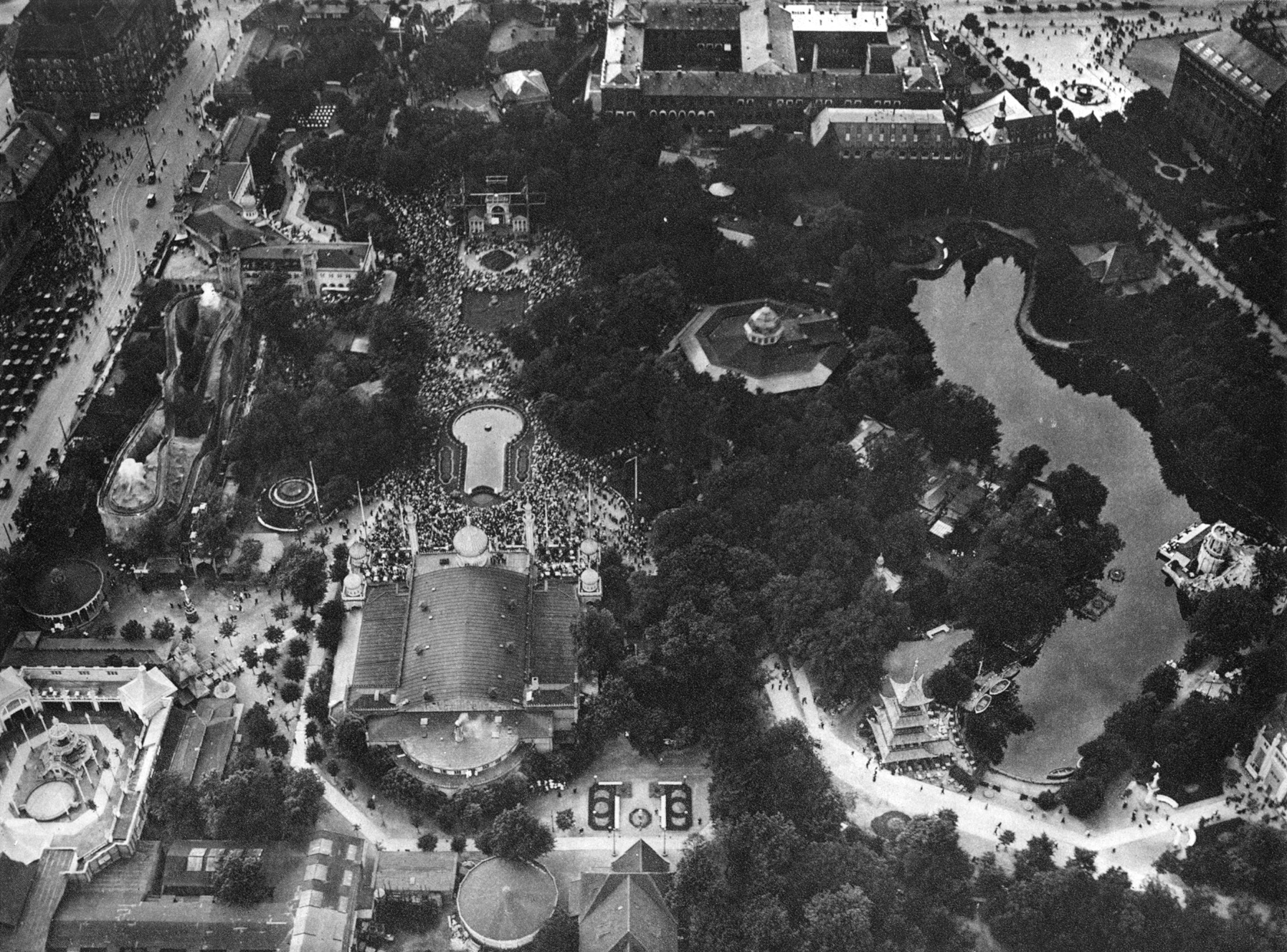
The Tivoli Gardens in Copenhagen, photographed from Spelterini's balloon on 22 June 1922

The outbreak of World War I put an end to Spelterini's travels. Borders were closed, and Spelterini's balloons remained grounded. He retired as an independent gentleman to Coppet near Geneva with his wife Emma (née Karpf), whom he had married on 28 January 1914 in the church of St Martin-in-the-Fields in London. But although he was well off financially, his savings diminished in the war years, and what was left of them was eaten up by the post-war inflation. The airplane had surpassed ballooning, nobody cared anymore about his pre-war exploits, and Spelterini was all but forgotten. In 1922, he hired out as a showman at the Tivoli Gardens in Copenhagen, posing for photos and taking people for short rides in a captive balloon. He detested it. Disappointed, he retired to Zipf near Vöcklabruck in Austria, where he had bought a small house and lived from the sale of the eggs of his 300 chickens. In 1926, he tried a last time to revive his old ballooning adventures. With the financial help of some friends, he started from Zurich in a rented balloon. But he fell unconscious during the voyage; his passengers just barely managed to crash-land the balloon in Vorarlberg. Spelterini returned to Zipf, where he died impoverished and largely unknown in 1931.
