= The Greatest Show on Earth (film) =

1952 film by Cecil B. DeMille

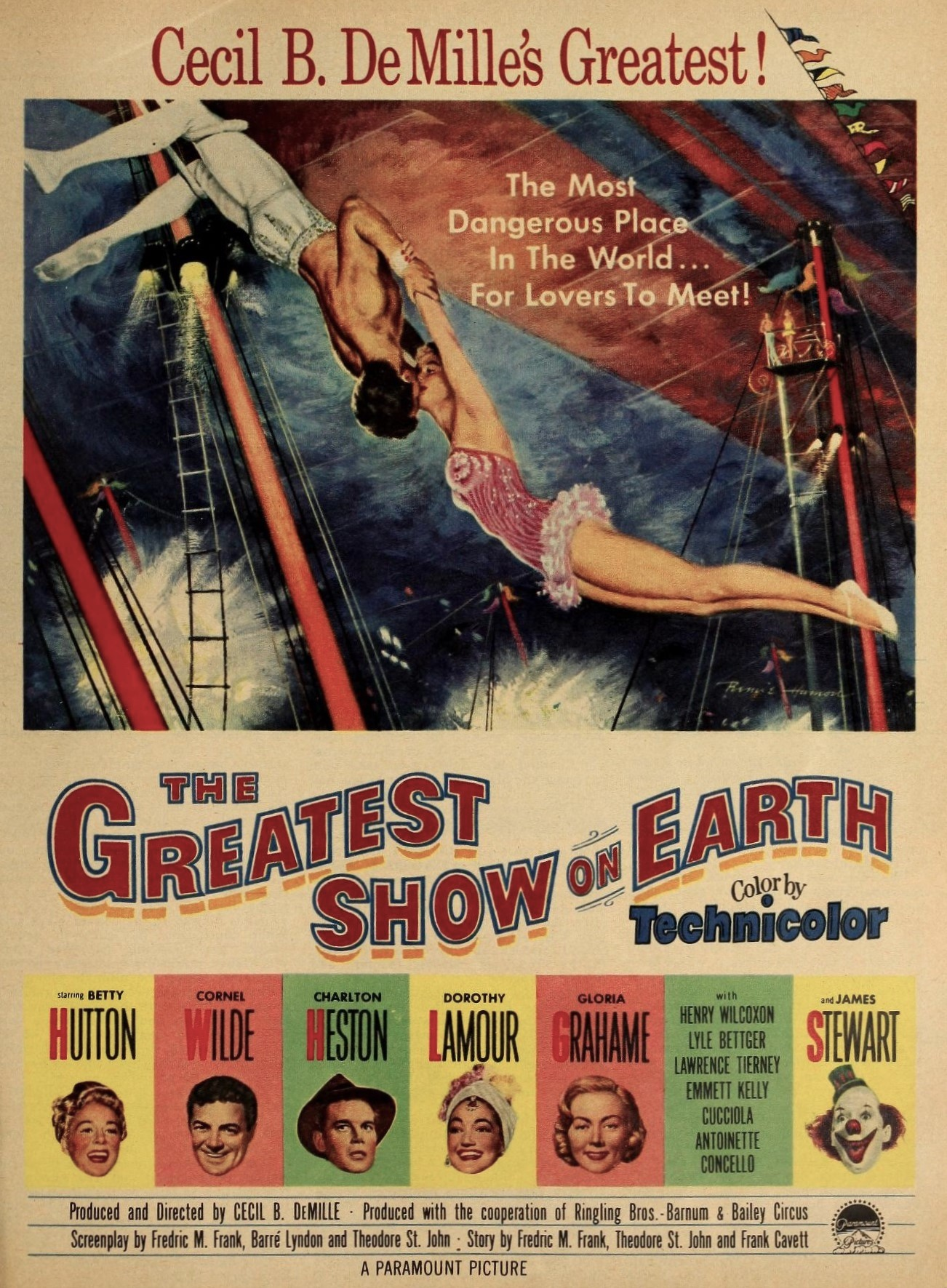
- Theatrical release poster
- Directed by: Cecil B. DeMille
- Screenplay by: Fredric M. Frank; Theodore St. John; Barré Lyndon
- Story by: Fredric M. Frank; Theodore St. John; Frank Cavett
- Produced by: Cecil B. DeMille
- Starring: Betty Hutton; Cornel Wilde; Charlton Heston; Dorothy Lamour; Gloria Grahame; Henry Wilcoxon; Lyle Bettger; Lawrence Tierney; Emmett Kelly; Cucciola; Antoinette Concello; James Stewart
- Narrated by: Cecil B. DeMille
- Cinematography: George Barnes
- Edited by: Anne Bauchens
- Music by: Victor Young
- Distributed by: Paramount Pictures
- Release dates: January 10, 1952 (New York City, premiere)
- Running time: 152 minutes
- Country: United States
- Language: English
- Budget: $4 million
- Box office: $36 million

The Greatest Show on Earth is a 1952 American Technicolor epic drama film produced and directed by Cecil B. DeMille, and released by Paramount Pictures. Set in the Ringling Bros. and Barnum & Bailey Circus, the film stars Betty Hutton and Cornel Wilde as trapeze artists competing for the center ring and Charlton Heston as the circus manager. James Stewart also stars as a mysterious clown who never removes his makeup, and Dorothy Lamour and Gloria Grahame also play supporting roles.

The film won Academy Awards for Best Picture and Best Story and was nominated for Best Costume Design, Best Director and Best Film Editing. It also won Golden Globe Awards for Best Cinematography, Best Director and Best Motion Picture – Drama.

== Plot ==
Brad Braden is the general manager of the world's largest railroad circus. The show's board of directors wants a short 10-week season rather than risking losing money in a postwar economy. Brad bargains to keep the circus on the road as long as it is profitable, keeping the 1,400 performers and staff employed.

Brad has to tell his aerialist girlfriend Holly that she is no longer the starring act with top billing. World-famous aerialist and notorious ladies' man The Great Sebastian has been hired as the main star to increase attendance. Buttons the Clown, who never appears without his makeup, seems to possess medical knowledge. Holly reads a newspaper article about a mercy killer but does not immediately connect the doctor who killed his wife to Buttons.

Sebastian arrives and is coldly greeted by two former lovers: Angel, who performs in the elephant act with the pathologically jealous Klaus, and Phyllis, who performs an iron jaw and vocal act. Sebastian, attracted to Holly, offers her the center ring, knowing that Brad will never allow the change. Holly is disappointed and vows that her ring will become the main focus.

Buttons' mother attends a performance and warns him that the police are on his trail. The competition between the two aerialists becomes increasingly dangerous. The aerial duel ends when Sebastian removes his safety net and then suffers a serious fall. Buttons tends to him before the ambulance arrives, impressing the circus' doctor. Holly gains the center ring and star billing, but she is devastated by how she attained it. Brad is unable to comfort her because she has romantic feelings for Sebastian.

Brad catches and fires crooked midway concessionaire Harry for cheating customers. Harry hangs about the show's periphery sowing disaffection, particularly with the jealous Klaus. Sebastian eventually rejoins the show, but with his right arm paralyzed, he can only perform menial work. Holly professes that she loves Sebastian, believing Brad has no feelings for her. When Angel starts a relationship with Brad, Klaus threatens to kill Angel during a performance with one of the elephants. Brad intervenes and fires Klaus.

Meanwhile a detective from special investigations at the Treasury Department is hunting the mercy killer and accompanies the circus train to Cedar City, believing that the doctor might be hiding in the show. Brad, never having seen Buttons out of makeup, does not recognize the doctor's photo. Buttons tells Brad that Sebastian has regained some feeling in his hand. Brad, having made the connection, casually mentions that the detective will be taking fingerprints in Cedar City, thereby allowing Buttons to escape or hide.

During a jump to a new venue, Harry and Klaus stop the first train to rob the pay wagon. Klaus sees the second section coming and realizes that Angel is aboard. He aims his car's headlights down the track to warn the oncoming train. Unable to brake in time, the second train smashes the car, killing Klaus and Harry, and then collides with the first section. Brad is pinned in the wreckage and is severely bleeding. Holly stops Buttons from fleeing and begs him to help Brad. Buttons gives Brad a direct blood transfusion from Sebastian. The detective assists him in his operation and later reluctantly arrests Buttons after Brad recovers.

Brad realizes that he loves Holly and Sebastian proposes to Angel, who accepts. Holly takes command, mounting a parade and an open-air performance before leading the troupe around the three rings, a recovery from the disaster that ensures that the circus will continue its national tour.

== Cast ==
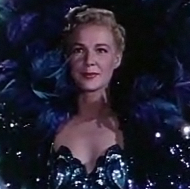
Betty Hutton as Holly

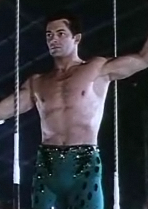
Cornel Wilde as The Great Sebastian

- Betty Hutton as Holly
- Cornel Wilde as The Great Sebastian
- Charlton Heston as Brad Braden
- James Stewart as Buttons the Clown
- Dorothy Lamour as Phyllis
- Gloria Grahame as Angel
- Henry Wilcoxon as FBI Agent Gregory
- Lawrence Tierney as Mr. Henderson
- Lyle Bettger as Klaus
- Bob Carson as Ringmaster
- John Ridgely as Assistant Manager
- Frank Wilcox as Circus doctor
- Brad Johnson as unnamed reporter
- John Kellogg as Harry
- Julia Faye as Birdie
- Lillian Albertson as Buttons' mother
- Edmond O'Brien as Narrator (uncredited)
- Charmienne Harker as Charmienne (uncredited)

The film features approximately 85 Ringling Bros. and Barnum & Bailey Circus acts, including clowns Emmett Kelly and Lou Jacobs, midget Cucciola, bandmaster Merle Evans, foot juggler Miss Loni and aerialist Antoinette Concello. John Ringling North plays himself as the owner of the circus.

The film includes several unbilled cameo appearances (mostly in the circus audiences), including those of Bob Hope and Bing Crosby, Lamour's costars in the Road to ... films. William Boyd appears in his usual guise of Hopalong Cassidy. Danny Thomas, Van Heflin, character actor Oliver Blake and Noel Neill are seen as circus patrons. Leon Ames is seen and heard in the trainwreck sequence. A barker, kept anonymous until the film's end, is seen in the closing moments of the film, and the voice is revealed to be that of Edmond O'Brien.

== Production ==
James Stewart, Charlton Heston and Cornel Wilde

The film was shot in Sarasota, Florida, where locals were paid 75 cents per hour as extras.

Betty Hutton and Cornel Wilde had to learn how to use the trapeze for their scenes, although Wilde may have faced difficulty because of his acrophobia. Hutton became proficient with the single bar, and film footage exists showing her rehearsing 40 feet (12 m) in the air. Hutton's stunt double was La Norma Fox, also from Ringling Bros. and Barnum & Bailey Circus.

Art Concello, RB&BB's general manager at the time and the first flyer ever to land the triple somersault in performance, devised the solution to The Great Sebastian's fall from the high rigging and executed the stunt for DeMille.

In addition to the actors, the real Ringling Bros. and Barnum & Bailey's Circus' 1951 troupe appears in the film with its complement of 1,400 people, hundreds of animals and 60 railroad cars of equipment and tents.

The music for the song "Lovely Luawana Lady" was written by John Ringling North, who appears briefly as himself during the discussion about whether the show would play the road rather than have a short ten-week season. North was a nephew of the five Ringling brothers who founded Ringling Bros. and Barnum & Bailey Circus and was its owner at the time.

== Release ==
The Greatest Show on Earth premiered at Radio City Music Hall in New York on January 10, 1952 and played there for 11 weeks, a record duration that it shared with Random Harvest (1942) that lasted for many years.

The film earned $12.8 million at the box office in the United States and Canada, making it the highest-grossing film of 1952, as well as Paramount's most successful film at that time. It was also the most popular film in Britain in 1952 and in France in 1953.

== Reception ==
In a contemporary review for The New York Times, critic Bosley Crowther called the film lusty triumph of circus showmanship and movie skill" and a "piece of entertainment that will delight movie audiences for years", writing:

Sprawling across a mammoth canvas, crammed with the real-life acts and thrills, as well as the vast backstage minutiae, that make the circus the glamorous thing it is and glittering in marvelous Technicolor—truly marvelous color, we repeat—this huge motion picture of the big-top is the dandiest ever put upon the screen.

Critic Edwin Schallert of the Los Angeles Times wrote:

The old trite phrase "with full panoply of glory" may well be applied to the way in which Cecil B. De Mille brings the circus to the screen in "The Greatest Show on Earth," a picture to be reckoned as one of the greatest of this master showman's shows. ... De Mille provides the maximum of entertainment in his production, not to speak of glamour, and above all the spirit that forever lurks under the big top. Even De Mille dissenters—and there are always bound to be a number among the supercritical—will unquestionably be fascinated by this example of his peculiar picture-making genius. He has all the latitude necessary in the subject itself for gorgeous and tinselled display. He succeeds by the very nature of things in giving what happens great authenticity. Moreover he tells a human narrative that has both appealing and thrilling climaxes.

== Accolades ==
At the 25th Academy Awards in 1953, The Greatest Show on Earth was nominated for five Academy Awards, winning two (for Best Picture and Best Motion Picture Story). DeMille's work as producer-director earned him his first Oscar nominations for Best Picture and Best Director, as well as his only competitive Oscar win (Best Picture). (Note: Cleopatra (1934) was the first DeMille film nominated for Best Picture ("Outstanding Production"), but at that time the nomination was awarded to the studio instead of the producer. DeMille would receive a second Best Picture nomination for The Ten Commandments (1956) four years later.) That same year, DeMille also received the Irving G. Thalberg Memorial Award. The Greatest Show on Earth was the last Best Picture winner to win fewer than three Academy Awards until Spotlight (2015).

Award	Category	Nominee(s)	Result	Ref.
Academy Awards	Best Motion Picture	Cecil B. DeMille	Won	
Academy Awards	Best Director	Cecil B. DeMille	Nominated	
Academy Awards	Best Motion Picture Story	Fredric M. Frank, Theodore St. John, and Frank Cavett	Won	
Academy Awards	Best Costume Design – Color	Edith Head, Dorothy Jeakins, and Miles White	Nominated	
Academy Awards	Best Film Editing	Anne Bauchens	Nominated	
Cleveland Film Critics Circle Award	Best Picture	Cecil B. DeMille	Won	
Directors Guild of America Awards	Outstanding Directorial Achievement in Motion Pictures	Cecil B. DeMille	Nominated	
Golden Globe Awards	Best Motion Picture – Drama		Won	
Golden Globe Awards	Best Director – Motion Picture	Cecil B. DeMille	Won	
Golden Globe Awards	Best Cinematography – Color	George Barnes and Peverell Marley	Won	
New York Film Critics Circle Awards	Best Film	Cecil B. DeMille	Nominated	
New York Film Critics Circle Awards	Best Director	Cecil B. DeMille	Nominated	

=== Oscar controversy ===
Some reviewers consider The Greatest Show on Earth among the weakest selections for the Academy Award for Best Picture, as it defeated highly rated films such as High Noon, The Quiet Man, Ivanhoe, Moulin Rouge and the unnominated Singin' in the Rain. In 2005, Empire listed it as the third-worst Best Picture winner. MSNBC's Erik Lundegaard called Crash the "worst Best Picture winner since the 'dull, bloated' film The Greatest Show on Earth." In 2013, the selection of The Greatest Show on Earth rather than High Noon was listed by Time among the 10 most controversial Best Picture races. Premiere placed the film on its list of the 10 worst Oscar winners. It holds the second-lowest spot on Rotten Tomatoes' 2011 list of the 90 films to win Best Picture (ahead of only 1929's The Broadway Melody).

Stanley Kramer alleged that the film's Best Picture award was the result of the political climate in Hollywood in 1952. DeMille was a conservative Republican involved with the National Committee for a Free Europe while High Noon was produced by Carl Foreman, who would soon appear on the Hollywood blacklist, and one of the scriptwriters of Ivanhoe, Marguerite Roberts, was also allegedly blacklisted.

Some believed that the award was a measure of respect for DeMille's career. In early March 1953, columnist Erskine Johnson predicted that The Greatest Show on Earth would win Best Picture: "High Noon and Moulin Rouge are in the same league, but I believe popular Academy sentiment will vote Cecil B. DeMille the award." After winning the Best Picture Academy Award, DeMille said, "I thought The Quiet Man or High Noon would get it." On March 20, 1953, James Bacon of the Associated Press wrote:

A happy Hollywood rejoiced today in honoring one of its founding fathers—Cecil B. De Mille whose Greatest Show on Earth became his first [Best Picture] Oscar winner in 40 years of epic making.

It was one of the few times Hollywood has honored one of its greats while he was still around to enjoy it.

The movie pioneer, now 72, was the big star of the silver jubilee Academy Awards last night. A film colony audience cheered wildly in the RKO Pantages Theater as millions more for the first time saw the ceremony via television.

== Influence ==
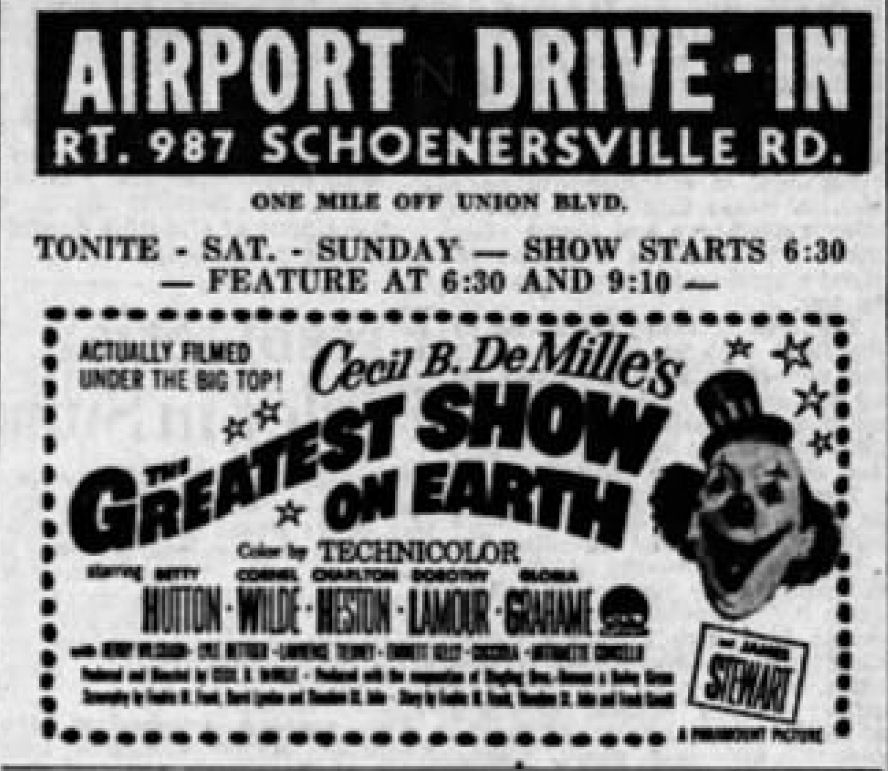
James Stewart in drive-in theater ad

A television series with the same title was inspired by the film, with Jack Palance in the role of Charlton Heston's character. The program ran on Tuesday evenings for 30 episodes on ABC during the 1963–1964 season.

The self-titled theme song later served as the theme for WGN-TV's long-running The Bozo Show.

The Greatest Show on Earth was the first film that director Steven Spielberg saw, and he credits it as one of the major inspirations that led him into a film career. He identifies the film's train crash scene as a major influence, reflected in the science-fiction film Super 8 (2011), which he produced. In an early scene in Spielberg's 2005 remake of War of the Worlds, the trainwreck sequence from The Greatest Show on Earth is briefly shown on a television. The opening scene of Spielberg's 2022 semiautobiographical film The Fabelmans dramatizes his reaction to viewing the film for the first time.

== See also ==
- Circus World (1964), another circus-centered epic
