= Antoinette Concello =

American trapeze artist (1910–1984)

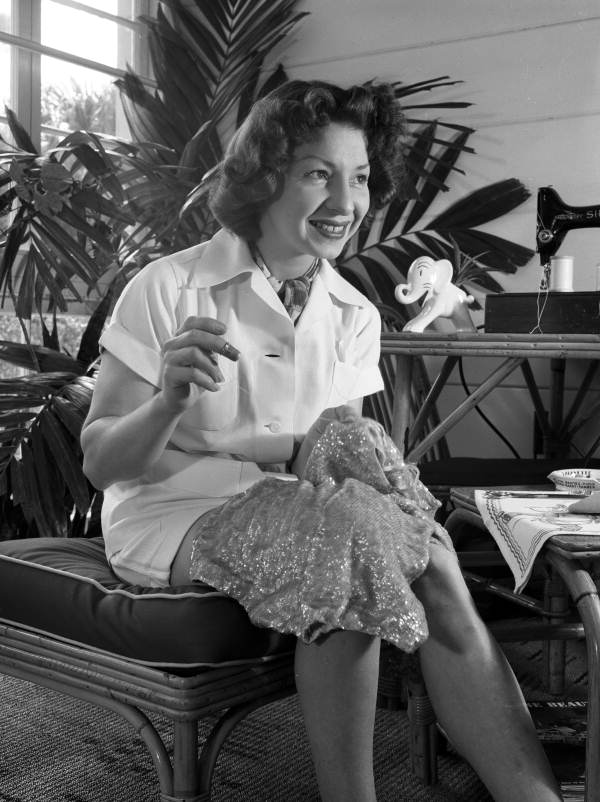
- Born: Marie Antoinette Comeau; April 22, 1910; Sutton, Quebec, Canada
- Died: February 5, 1984 (aged 73); Sarasota, Florida, U.S.
- Resting place: Park Hill Cemetery
- Other names: "Tony" "Queen of the Flying Trapeze"
- Occupation: Circus performer
- Employer: Ringling Bros. and Barnum & Bailey Circus
- Known for: Flying Trapeze
- Spouse: Arthur M. Concello
- Awards: Circus Hall of Fame (1963)

Antoinette Concello (April 22, 1910 – February 5, 1984) was a Canadian-American trapeze artist who became the first woman to perform a triple somersault on the flying trapeze. She was inducted into the Circus Hall of Fame in 1963.

== Early life ==
Marie Antoinette Comeau was born on April 22, 1910, in Sutton, Quebec, Canada. Her parents were Toussaint and DeJane Hudson Comeau.

She spent four years in a convent school in Montreal.

== Circus life ==
In the late 1920s, she visited her older sister Gertrude "Mickey" King, a member of an aerial troupe known as the Flying Wards. Antoinette, then sixteen years old, was introduced to the circus life by her sister, who had been performing with the Sells Floto Circus in Detroit. Antoinette became part of the circus in 1927. She made her debut performing an Iron Jaw act, suspended by her teeth from a leather strap.

While training with the Flying Wards in Bloomington, Illinois, she met an expert trapeze artist, Art Concello, whom she later married. Art trained her in becoming a flyer—or leaper—in trapeze performance. With Art, she helped execute the flying trapeze act of the Flying Concello troupe.

In 1931, the circus aerialists joined the Ringling Bros. and Barnum & Bailey Circus under John Ringling North. For many seasons, the Flying Concellos performed with the circus company.

During her aerial routines, Antoinette regularly executed two and a half somersaults. Once she had mastered various aerial stunts, she was prepared by Art Concello to attempt the triple somersault, among the most difficult flying tricks. In the summer of 1937 in Detroit, he decided she was ready. She landed the triple somersault at the Detroit Shrine Circus, with Edward Ward Jr. as her catcher. Antoinette gained international fame as the first woman to perform a triple somersault on the flying trapeze. Both her and Art's ability to each perform the triple made them an unmatched act for much of that time.

After injuring her right shoulder in 1943, she returned to performing aerial acts in 1949.

Antoinette Concello was hired in 1950 by filmmaker Cecil B. DeMille to train Betty Hutton ahead of her trapeze artist role in The Greatest Show on Earth. Concello made a cameo appearance in DeMille's 1952 film. She also coached Cornel Wilde and Dorothy Lamour for their trapeze scenes.

Following her retirement from performing in 1953, Concello remained at the Ringling Bros. and Barnum & Bailey Circus as the show's aerial director, a position she held until 1983. She was responsible for choreographing the aerial ballet and conducting daily checks with every member of the aerial corps.

== Filmography ==
Concello acted in the following film:

Year	Title	Role	Notes
1952	The Greatest Show on Earth	Herself	

== Personal life ==
She married Arthur "Art" Concello, who later became general manager of Ringling Bros. and Barnum & Bailey Circus, and had a son named Randall "Randy" Cope Concello.

Antoinette resided near the Ringling-Barnum Circus' winter quarters in Sarasota, Florida.

== Death ==
Antoinette Concello died in Sarasota, Florida, United States, on February 5, 1984, at 73.

== Legacy ==
Antoinette Concello was known as the "greatest woman flyer of all time." While performing with the Ringling Brothers and Barnum & Bailey Circus, Concello made history as the first woman to land a triple somersault in the air.

In 1935, she was featured on the back panel of Wheaties cereal boxes by General Mills. As early as 1934, the trapeze star appeared in a Camel cigarette advertisement campaign. Following her historic triple, Concello featured in a Camel ad which dubbed her the "Queen of the Air."

Antoinette Concello was the first living person to be named to the International Circus Hall of Fame in 1963. She was inducted into the Circus Ring of Fame in 1992.
