= Thomas Monroe (writer) =

American screenwriter (1902–1960)

- Born: September 26, 1902
- Died: April 24, 1960 (aged 57); Los Angeles, California, U.S.
- Occupation: Screenwriter

Thomas Monroe (September 26, 1902-April 24, 1960) was an American screenwriter who was nominated twice for the Academy Award for Best Story.

== Life ==
Between 1941 and 1958, Monroe wrote the templates and scripts for only five films and television series. He was nominated for the Academy Award for Best Story for his first work, along with Billy Wilder, at the 14th Academy Awards in 1942 for the film, Ball of Fire. His second Oscar nomination for best story was for The Affairs of Susan, co-written by László Görög. He died in Sawtelle, California.

The screenplay to Ball of Fire was also the basis for the Turkish film Ateş Gibi Kadın (1965, starring Tanju Gürsu, Leyla Sayar and Zafer Önen).

== Filmography ==
- Ball of Fire (1941)
- The Affairs of Susan (1945)
- A Song Is Born (1948)
- At This Moment (1954 short)
- The Texan (1958, for television)
