= Jaws of Life (disambiguation) =

The phrase Jaws of Life refers to various hydraulic rescue tools.

Jaws of Life or variants may also refer to:

- The Jaws of Life (Hunters & Collectors album), 1984
- The Jaws of Life (Pierce the Veil album), 2023
- Iron jaw (circus), circus act also called Jaws of Life
