= Apolonia Van Voorden =

Dutch American foot juggler

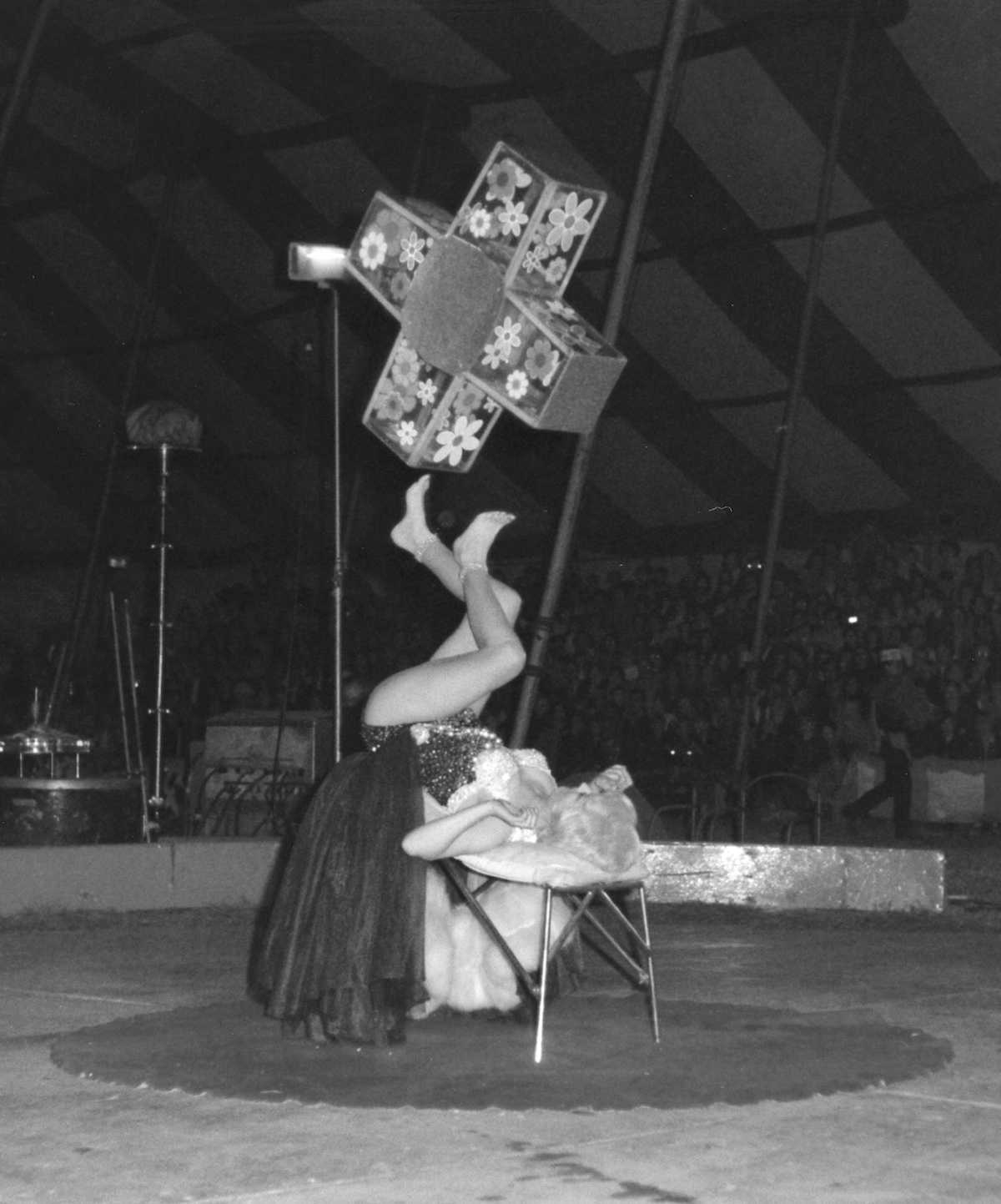
- Van Voorden in 1973
- Born: Apolonia Abeen; April 14, 1926; Amsterdam, Netherlands
- Died: November 11, 2012 (aged 86); Highland, Illinois
- Resting place: Highland Cemetery
- Other names: Miss Loni
- Citizenship: American
- Occupation: Foot juggler
- Employer(s): Ringling Bros. and Barnum & Bailey Circus, Circus Vargas, Harlem Globetrotters, et al.
- Spouse: Frederik Jan Van Voorden
- Awards: Queen of the Circus (1961) as voted by members of the International Circus Fans Association

Apolonia "Miss Loni" Van Voorden (née Abeen; April 14, 1926 - November 11, 2012) was a Dutch American foot juggler who began her career at the age of 10 in her father's family circus in the Netherlands.

Born in Amsterdam, Netherlands, in 1926, Apolonia Abeen emigrated to the United States on March 28, 1950 and gave her first performance there with the Ringling Bros. and Barnum & Bailey Circus, working in a display with juggler Francis Brunn. After being introduced to Cecil B. DeMille, she was asked to be in his 1952 movie, The Greatest Show on Earth. Ten years later in 1962 she was cast as a circus performer in the movie Billy Rose's Jumbo.

Van Voorden became a naturalized United States Citizen on July 9, 1963.

In addition to performing with the Ringling Bros. and Barnum & Bailey Circus, Van Voorden's extensive career also saw her juggle with Circus Vargas, The Polack Brothers Circus, and Minsky's Follies. She regularly performed at various venues such as "... fairs, festivals, night clubs, and special events." For two years, she was featured as a half-time act with the Harlem Globetrotters.

Van Voorden was voted the 1961 "Queen of the Circus" by the International Circus Fans Association.

== Filmography ==
Year	Title	Role	Notes
1952	The Greatest Show on Earth	Herself	
1962	Billy Rose's Jumbo	Circus Performer #7	(final film role)
