= Academy Award for Best Story =

Academy Award

The Academy Award for Best Story was an Academy Award given from the beginning of the Academy Awards until 1956. The award co-existed with the Academy Award for Best Adapted Screenplay and Academy Award for Best Original Screenplay. The Oscar for Best Story most closely resembles the usage of modern film treatments, or prose documents that describe the entire plot and characters, but typically lack most dialogue. A separate screenwriter would convert the story into a full screenplay.

As an example, at the 1944 Academy Awards, producer and director Leo McCarey won Best Story for Going My Way while screenwriters Frank Butler and Frank Cavett won Best Screenplay. The elimination of this category in 1956 reflected the decline of Hollywood's studio system and the emergence of independent screenwriters.

== Winners and nominees ==
=== 1920s ===
Year	Film	Nominees
1927–1928 (1st)
1927–1928 (1st)	Underworld	Ben Hecht
1927–1928 (1st)	The Last Command	Lajos Bíró
1927–1928 (1st)	The Circus	Charlie Chaplin (Note: The Circus originally received a nomination for Best Director (Comedy Picture), as well as nominations for Best Actor and Best Writing (Original Story), all for Charles Chaplin. However, the Academy subsequently decided to remove Chaplin's name from the competitive award categories and instead to confer upon him a Special Award "for acting, writing, directing and producing The Circus". Chilton, Martin (May 16, 2016). "The first Oscars: what happened in 1929". The Daily Telegraph. Archived from the original on May 19, 2016.)

=== 1930s ===
Year	Film	Nominees
1930–1931 (4th)
1930–1931 (4th)	The Dawn Patrol	John Monk Saunders
1930–1931 (4th)	Doorway to Hell	Rowland Brown
1930–1931 (4th)	Laughter	Harry d'Abbadie d'Arrast, Douglas Doty, Donald Ogden Stewart
1930–1931 (4th)	The Public Enemy	John Bright, Kubec Glasmon
1930–1931 (4th)	Smart Money	Lucien Hubbard, Joseph Jackson
1931–1932 (5th)
1931–1932 (5th)	The Champ	Frances Marion
1931–1932 (5th)	Lady and Gent	Grover Jones, William Slavens McNutt
1931–1932 (5th)	The Star Witness	Lucien Hubbard
1931–1932 (5th)	What Price Hollywood?	Adela Rogers St. Johns, Jane Murfin
1932–1933 (6th)
1932–1933 (6th)	One Way Passage	Robert Lord
1932–1933 (6th)	The Prizefighter and the Lady	Frances Marion
1932–1933 (6th)	Rasputin and the Empress	Charles MacArthur
1934 (7th)
1934 (7th)	Manhattan Melodrama	Arthur Caesar
1934 (7th)	Hide-Out	Mauri Grashin
1934 (7th)	The Richest Girl in the World	Norman Krasna
1935 (8th) (Note: G Men, story by Gregory Rogers (a pseudonym of Darryl F. Zanuck), was not officially nominated for this award, but appears in Academy records because it placed second in voting as a write-in candidate in 1935.)
1935 (8th)	The Scoundrel	Ben Hecht, Charles MacArthur
1935 (8th)	Broadway Melody of 1936	Moss Hart
1935 (8th)	The Gay Deception	Stephen Morehouse Avery, Don Hartman
1936 (9th)
1936 (9th)	The Story of Louis Pasteur	Pierre Collings, Sheridan Gibney
1936 (9th)	Fury	Norman Krasna
1936 (9th)	The Great Ziegfeld	William Anthony McGuire
1936 (9th)	San Francisco	Robert Hopkins
1936 (9th)	Three Smart Girls	Adele Comandini
1937 (10th)
1937 (10th)	A Star Is Born	Robert Carson, William Wellman
1937 (10th)	Black Legion	Robert Lord
1937 (10th)	In Old Chicago	Niven Busch
1937 (10th)	The Life of Emile Zola	Heinz Herald, Geza Herczeg
1937 (10th)	One Hundred Men and a Girl	Hans Kraly
1938 (11th)
1938 (11th)	Boys Town	Eleanore Griffin, Dore Schary
1938 (11th)	Alexander's Ragtime Band	Irving Berlin
1938 (11th)	Angels with Dirty Faces	Rowland Brown
1938 (11th)	Blockade	John Howard Lawson
1938 (11th)	Mad About Music	Marcella Burke, Frederick Kohner
1938 (11th)	Test Pilot	Frank Wead
1939 (12th)
1939 (12th)	Mr. Smith Goes to Washington	Lewis R. Foster
1939 (12th)	Bachelor Mother	Felix Jackson
1939 (12th)	Love Affair	Mildred Cram, Leo McCarey
1939 (12th)	Ninotchka	Melchior Lengyel
1939 (12th)	Young Mr. Lincoln	Lamar Trotti

=== 1940s ===
Year	Film	Nominees
1940 (13th)
1940 (13th)	Arise, My Love	Benjamin Glazer, John Toldy
1940 (13th)	Comrade X	Walter Reisch
1940 (13th)	Edison, the Man	Hugo Butler, Dore Schary
1940 (13th)	My Favorite Wife	Leo McCarey, Samuel Spewack and Bella Spewack
1940 (13th)	The Westerner	Stuart N. Lake
1941 (14th)
1941 (14th)	Here Comes Mr. Jordan	Harry Segall
1941 (14th)	Ball of Fire	Thomas Monroe, Billy Wilder
1941 (14th)	The Lady Eve	Monckton Hoffe
1941 (14th)	Meet John Doe	Richard Connell, Robert Presnell, Jr.
1941 (14th)	Night Train to Munich	Gordon Wellesley
1942 (15th)
1942 (15th)	49th Parallel	Emeric Pressburger
1942 (15th)	Holiday Inn	Irving Berlin
1942 (15th)	The Pride of the Yankees	Paul Gallico
1942 (15th)	The Talk of the Town	Sidney Harmon
1942 (15th)	Yankee Doodle Dandy	Robert Buckner
1943 (16th)
1943 (16th)	The Human Comedy	William Saroyan
1943 (16th)	Action in the North Atlantic	Guy Gilpatric
1943 (16th)	Destination Tokyo	Steve Fisher
1943 (16th)	The More the Merrier	Frank Ross, Robert Russell
1943 (16th)	Shadow of a Doubt	Gordon McDonell
1944 (17th)
1944 (17th)	Going My Way	Leo McCarey
1944 (17th)	A Guy Named Joe	David Boehm, Chandler Sprague
1944 (17th)	Lifeboat	John Steinbeck
1944 (17th)	None Shall Escape	Alfred Neumann, Joseph Than
1944 (17th)	The Sullivans	Edward Doherty, Jules Schermer
1945 (18th)
1945 (18th)	The House on 92nd Street	Charles G. Booth
1945 (18th)	The Affairs of Susan	László Görög, Thomas Monroe
1945 (18th)	A Medal for Benny	John Steinbeck, Jack Wagner
1945 (18th)	Objective, Burma!	Alvah Bessie
1945 (18th)	A Song to Remember	Ernst Marischka
1946 (19th)
1946 (19th)	Vacation from Marriage	Clemence Dane
1946 (19th)	The Dark Mirror	Vladimir Solomonovich Pozner
1946 (19th)	The Strange Love of Martha Ivers	Jack Patrick
1946 (19th)	The Stranger	Victor Trivas
1946 (19th)	To Each His Own	Charles Brackett
1947 (20th)
1947 (20th)	Miracle on 34th Street	Valentine Davies
1947 (20th)	A Cage of Nightingales (French: La Cage aux rossignols)	Georges Chaperot, René Wheeler
1947 (20th)	It Happened on Fifth Avenue	Herbert Clyde Lewis, Frederick Stephani
1947 (20th)	Kiss of Death	Eleazar Lipsky
1947 (20th)	Smash-Up, the Story of a Woman	Frank Cavett, Dorothy Parker
1948 (21st)
1948 (21st)	The Search	Richard Schweizer, David Wechsler
1948 (21st)	Louisiana Story	Robert J. Flaherty, Frances H. Flaherty
1948 (21st)	The Naked City	Malvin Wald
1948 (21st)	Red River	Borden Chase
1948 (21st)	The Red Shoes	Emeric Pressburger
1949 (22nd)
1949 (22nd)	The Stratton Story	Douglas Morrow
1949 (22nd)	Come to the Stable	Clare Boothe Luce
1949 (22nd)	It Happens Every Spring	Valentine Davies, Shirley Smith
1949 (22nd)	Sands of Iwo Jima	Harry Brown
1949 (22nd)	White Heat	Virginia Kellogg

=== 1950s ===
Year	Film	Nominees
1950 (23rd)
1950 (23rd)	Panic in the Streets	Edna Anhalt, Edward Anhalt
1950 (23rd)	Bitter Rice	Giuseppe De Santis, Carlo Lizzani
1950 (23rd)	The Gunfighter	William Bowers, André de Toth
1950 (23rd)	Mystery Street	Leonard Spigelgass
1950 (23rd)	When Willie Comes Marching Home	Sy Gomberg
1951 (24th)
1951 (24th)	Seven Days to Noon	James Bernard, Paul Dehn
1951 (24th)	Bullfighter and the Lady	Budd Boetticher, Ray Nazarro
1951 (24th)	The Frogmen	Oscar Millard
1951 (24th)	Here Comes the Groom	Liam O'Brien, Robert Riskin
1951 (24th)	Teresa	Alfred Hayes, Stewart Stern
1952 (25th)
1952 (25th)	The Greatest Show on Earth	Frank Cavett, Fredric M. Frank, Theodore St. John
1952 (25th)	My Son John	Leo McCarey
1952 (25th)	The Narrow Margin	Martin Goldsmith, Jack Leonard
1952 (25th)	The Pride of St. Louis	Guy Trosper
1952 (25th)	The Sniper	Edward Anhalt, Edna Anhalt
1953 (26th)
1953 (26th)	Roman Holiday	Dalton Trumbo (Note: The screen credit and award was originally credited to Ian McLellan Hunter, who was a front for Trumbo. On December 15, 1992, the Board of Governors voted to retroactively attribute the award to Trumbo. Hunter's name was removed. Although Trumbo had died some years earlier, he had been alive in 1954 and this is not considered a posthumous award.)
1953 (26th)	Above and Beyond	Beirne Lay, Jr.
1953 (26th)	The Captain's Paradise	Alec Coppel
1953 (26th)	Hondo	Louis L'Amour (Note: Originally announced on February 15, 1954, as a nominee in this category. On February 17, 1954, letters from the producer and nominee questioned its inclusion in the category, as it was based on the short story, "The Gift of Cochise", by the nominee, Mr. L'Amour, published in Collier's magazine on July 5, 1952. By waiver, the title of the short story was not included in the film's credits. The nomination was withdrawn, and only four nominees were included on the final ballot. The Academy thanked Mr. L'Amour and despite this incident, offered him a membership in the Academy.)
1953 (26th)	Little Fugitive	Ray Ashley, Morris Engel, Ruth Orkin
1954 (27th)
1954 (27th)	Broken Lance	Philip Yordan
1954 (27th)	Bread, Love and Dreams (Italian: Pane, amore e fantasia)	Ettore Margadonna
1954 (27th)	Forbidden Games (French: Jeux interdits)	François Boyer
1954 (27th)	Night People	Jed Harris, Tom Reed
1954 (27th)	There's No Business Like Show Business	Lamar Trotti (posthumous nomination)
1955 (28th)
1955 (28th)	Love Me or Leave Me	Daniel Fuchs
1955 (28th)	The Private War of Major Benson	Joe Connelly, Bob Mosher
1955 (28th)	Rebel Without a Cause	Nicholas Ray
1955 (28th)	The Sheep Has Five Legs (French: Le Mouton à cinq pattes)	Jean Marsan, Henri Troyat, Jacques Perret, Henri Verneuil, Raoul Ploquin
1955 (28th)	Strategic Air Command	Beirne Lay, Jr.
1956 (29th)
1956 (29th)	The Brave One	Dalton Trumbo (Note: The name of the writer credited with authorship, Robert Rich, turned out to be an alias for Trumbo, who was being blacklisted at that time. On May 2, 1975, then-Academy president Walter Mirisch presented the Award to Trumbo.)
1956 (29th)	The Eddy Duchin Story	Leo Katcher
1956 (29th)	High Society	Edward Bernds, Elwood Ullman (Note: The authors of this Bowery Boys film respectfully withdrew their own names and the nomination. They were aware that voters had probably mistaken their film with the 1956 MGM musical of the same name starring Bing Crosby, Grace Kelly and Frank Sinatra which was based on The Philadelphia Story. This nomination was not included on the final ballot.)
1956 (29th)	The Proud and the Beautiful (French: Les Orgueilleux)	Jean-Paul Sartre
1956 (29th)	Umberto D.	Cesare Zavattini

== See also ==
- List of Academy Award–nominated films
