= Leona Dare =

American trapeze artist and acrobat

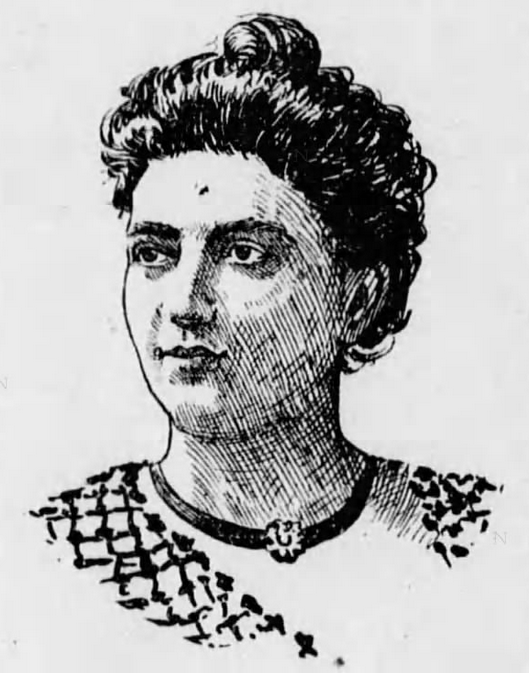
- Born: Susan Adeline Stuart; 1854/55
- Died: May 23/24, 1922; Spokane, Washington, US
- Occupation(s): Trapeze artist, acrobat
- Spouses: Thomas Hall; Ernest Theodore Grunebaum

Leona Dare (1854/55 – May 23/24, 1922) was an American trapeze artist and aerial acrobat, billed often as the "Queen of the Antilles" or the "Pride of Madrid". She was famous for her stunts on trapezes suspended from ascending balloons.

== Early life ==
Leona Dare was born in 1855 as Susan Adeline Stuart or Stewart. A 1912 article in The Charlotte News claimed that Dare's mother, Annie Meiza, was called "The Child of the Alamo" after the battle in 1836, and that her mother, Dare's grandmother, was "killed by a stray bullet" during the event. The article claims that Meiza was born during the battle and later adopted by a soldier's family and sent to Cuba, returning to the United States in her late teens, met Jackson Stuart of Louisiana and married. The article states that Stuart left to join the Civil War effort, leaving Meiza and three children in Georgia, and when news broke of Sherman's March to the Sea, the family fled. Ultimately Meiza left her children, including Dare, with a relative in order to return and secure their family home, and when she returned Dare and her two brothers had been sent to Atlanta for safety. The article says the children never saw Meiza again, and Stuart, a private in the Eighth Louisiana Infantry Regiment, died in 1863. Later in life, Dare spent substantial time and funds searching for her mother, but the two were never reunited.

== Career ==
=== Beginning trapeze and marriage to Thomas Hall ===
After the Civil War, Dare and her brothers were sent to live with relatives in New Orleans, and it was there she began studying trapeze. Her teachers in acrobatics were the Hall brothers, Thomas and Stewart Hall, who were sometimes billed as the "Brothers Dare".

In 1871, the Salt Lake Daily Review reviewed Dare's trapeze performance and her first publicized brush with death, stating: "This beautiful young lady lost her balance, while at a hight [sic] of thirty-two feet from the floor, and was soon revolving in the air ... in danger of instant death ... a young man jumped from his seat and caught her in his arms, and saved her life. Perfect strangers to each other until that moment ... culminated in a marriage between the two parties." She married Thomas Hall in New Orleans or in New York City (sources disagree) soon after. Despite the story of an impulsive marriage, later coverage in London stated that Hall knew Dare prior to the night of her accident and was her teacher, an indication that their alleged meeting may have been a publicity stunt. Their marriage certificate, dated months before the accident, supports this theory.

=== Balloon ascensions ===
By 1872, Dare was billed as "The Aerial Queen," a year after she debuted as an artist at Nixon's Amphitheatre in New York City. It was in 1872 that Dare began working with Joel E. Warner. Her specialty was iron jaw, in which she held onto her supporting apparatus with nothing but the strength of her bite, or in which she herself held other artists or their supports with her mouth only. In August 1872, she performed in Indianapolis for the first time suspended under a hot-air balloon approximately three hundred feet in the air, an act called ballon ascensions, lifting her husband and partner off the ground, holding him by his waistband only with her teeth. Critics speculated that the feats were too dangerous:

"the authorities ought to prohibit these hot air balloon ascensions, as they are dangerous and unprofitable, and we ourselves never wish to ever again witness the foolhardy daring of Hall and Leona Dare up in a balloon."

Dare was billed as "the most graceful and intrepid female gymnast in the world" by 1874. By mid-year, it was reported that Dare and Hall made upwards of $150 in New York and $200 outside of New York, substantial earnings at the time.

=== Accident in St. Louis ===
The New Orleans Republican reported in 1875 that Dare "fell at a variety theatre in St. Louis...where she was executing her flying trapeze act, and severely injured her back and side." Her injuries were so severe that The Times-Democrat ran a front-page article on November 23 titled "Death of Leona Dare," alleging that her injuries were fatal. After the false death notice, press coverage announced that Dare was closing her North American tour and preparing to travel to Europe after she recovered, as evidenced in her passport application filed in October 1876. Hall applied for a passport at the same time.

=== European tour and press ===
In 1878, Dare received positive reviews for her iron jaw act at The Oxford in London. Billed as the Queen of the Antilles, the coverage described her act in great detail, stating:

"Taking the strap, which her companion has fastened to his waist, between her teeth, she holds him first in a horizontal position, and then sets his body in rotatory motion. The 'page' presented becomes absolutely terrific, and we are by no means surprised when at the end the victim of this whirligig movement exhibits signs of giddiness...All who see Leona Dare will envy her teeth, and must marvel at her strength of jaw."

Subsequently, she toured through Europe. Her performances at the foremost locations in Europe, including the Folies Bergère in Paris, made her rather famous in Europe. In 1875, she left her husband, though she later claimed he had abandoned her, details of which came out in an 1879 lawsuit.

In 1879, London news reported a substantial lawsuit brought against Mr. Jennings, then manager of The Oxford, by Thomas Hall, seeking to "recover possession of the apparatus" Dare used for performances, including her iron jaw mouthpiece. Hall's lawsuit alleged that he constructed Dare's apparatus and owned it. However, the lawsuit press coverage was also the first mention of Dare's separation from Hall, stating that Dare left Hall in 1875 and traveled alone to England, where he followed. The lawsuit sought to leave Dare without options for performance, because she could not complete her act without the apparatus, described as being an intricate device with "stretcher bars, a leaping pedestal, leaping bars, single and double bars, and many pulley blocks," plus the mouthpiece. This is one of the earliest known descriptions of the full iron jaw apparatus. In his lawsuit, Hall stated that Dare "went away without his permission" and he will not grant her request for divorce. Dare, not present for depositions, was on file claiming she and Hall had been separated for years and he already had half her earnings. Ultimately, the jury sides with Hall and returned the apparatus to him, valued at £100.

=== Accident in Vienna and marriage to Ernest Grunebaum ===
In early 1880, Dare fell from her trapeze at the Imperial Court Theatre in Vienna and was seriously injured, with newspaper coverage announcing she would never perform again. It was here that Dare was first linked to Ernest Theodore Grunebaum, a Vienna resident with substantial wealth, who pursued her while she recovered in the hospital. The two married and returned to Chicago. Back in Chicago later that year, it was discovered that she was still married to Hall, yet she managed to get a divorce from Hall (in absentia) on November 15 and remarried Grunebaum in Chicago on November 17, 1880.

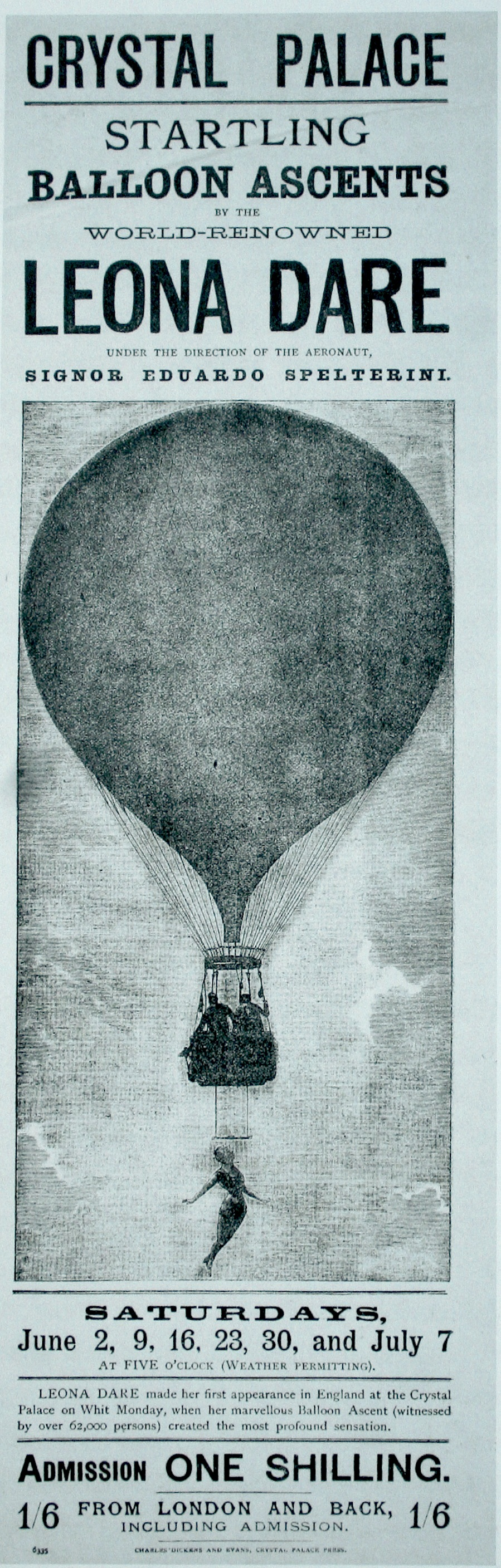
Newspaper advertisement for Leona Dare's ascents from Crystal Palace in London

=== Accident in Spain and death of partner ===
Later in the early 1880s, she appeared again on European stages. In 1884, she had accident during a performance in Valencia in Spain, where she let drop her partner, who died of his injuries. The Boston Globe reported on the incident, describing Dare's reaction in detail:

"Leona Dare, the American acrobat, was hanging by her feet from the roof of the theatre and holding in her teeth a trapeze, on which M. George was performing. Miss Dare was seized with a nervous fit, and dropped the trapeze. M. George fell to the floor and was fatally injured...Miss dare clung to the roof, screaming hysterically, and was rescued with difficulty after the panic was ended."

This accident launched substantial speculation and gossip about Dare's competency as an iron jaw performer. An 1884 excerpt in the Police Gazette stated that her "false teeth are said to have caused, by slipping, the fall and death of her partner, M. George."

=== Later career and accident in Paris ===
In 1888, an interview with Dare about her iron jaw career was published in The North-Eastern Daily Gazette. This is one of the few known interviews with Dare quoted, explaining balloon ascensions in detail:

"A trapeze is attached to the bottom of the basket suspended dfrom the balloon, and to the cross-bar an iron hook is fixed, which has an indiarubber mouth piece at one end. 'This,' Miss Dare proceeds, 'I take into my mouth; the balloon is started, and I ascend, hanging below it with my arms and legs, and in fact, my whole body perfectly free except that I hold the mouthpiece between by teeth.'"

Dare teamed up with Swiss balloonist Eduard Spelterini. He would take her, suspended under the basket of his balloon, to great heights (some sources speak of 5,000 feet), while she performed her acrobatics. Their ascents in June and July 1888 at the Crystal Palace in London made them world-famous, and together they toured through Europe until Moscow. In October 1889, they were at Bucharest, apparently their last performance together.

In 1890, Leona Dare was again in Paris. During another balloon show, she let go of the trapeze when the balloon drifted away, and broke her leg.

=== Retirement and death ===
Around 1894/95, she appears to have stopped performing altogether. It was at this time that Dare began searching, again, for her mother. The two were never reunited. After her retirement, she lived at Oakwood, Staten Island. She died at Spokane, Washington at the age of 67, and shares a headstone with Leona Musser, her niece who died three years later. Her many obituaries detailed the balloon ascensions and iron jaw acts, including the New York Times, which celebrated her worldwide success for "hanging by her teeth from a pendant on the trapeze."

== Sources ==
- Leona Dare's Trapeze, New York Times, June 9, 1879; from the London News, May 29, 1879.
- The Romance in a Trapeze Performer's Life, New York Times, November 26, 1880; from the Chicago Tribune, November 17, 1880.
- An Acrobat's Nervousness, New York Times, November 23, 1884.
- Leona Dare, Acrobat, Dead, New York Times, May 25, 1922.
- Leona Dare's accident at the Princess's Theatre, Valencia, Spain, The Entr'acte, London, December 13, 1884.
- Buiu, I. V.: Contributions to the history of aeronautics in Romania, English abstract, Ph.D. thesis, 2007.
- Capus, A.: "Geschenke des Himmels", p. 36-50 in Das Magazin 38/2007. In German.
- Crouch, T. D.: The Eagle Aloft: Two Centuries of the Balloon in America, Smithsonian Institution Press, 1983. ISBN 0-87474-346-X.
- Norris, Aíne: "The Tenacious Women of Iron Jaw," Bandwagon: The Journal of the Circus Historical Society, vol. 65, no. 3, 2021.
- Photographer: Jeremiah Gurney (1869–1874). "Leona Dare (1855-1922)". Minneapolis Institute of Art.
- Slout, W. L.: Olympians of the Sawdust Circle: A Biographical Dictionary of the Nineteenth Century American Circus, Clipper Studies in the Theatre, No. 18; Borgo Press, 1997. ISBN 0-8095-0310-7.
- Tait, P.: Circus Bodies: Cultural Identity in Aerial Performance, p. 45-48 and p. 159, notes 23 and 24. Routledge Chapman & Hall, 2005. ISBN 0-415-32938-8.
