= Jeri Sullavan =

American singer

Jeri Sullavan (1919–2003) was an American singer who performed on radio and in personal appearances. She was featured in cover stories in the national magazines Radio Mirror and Tune In.

== Early years ==
Sullavan was born Leona McGinty in Jersey City, New Jersey, in 1919 and moved with her family to Bremerton, Washington, when she was a teenager. Her academic classes included shorthand and typing. She took lessons in tap, toe, and ballet dancing as she trained to be a professional dancer, debuting at age 7. In her teenage years her focus shifted to singing, and she took vocal lessons, first in Seattle and later in California and Chicago. She graduated from Bremerton High School in 1936. While there she was a member of the Glee Club, sang in school plays, and wrote the class song for the 1936 graduates.

== Career ==
Sullavan's first professional engagement was singing in a ballroom in Bremerton, earning $1.50 per night. In 1937 she left Bremerton to tour with Peri Maurer and his orchestra, billed as Jeri Powell. A visit to a nightclub in San Francisco led to her working with Bernie Cummins and his orchestra. She later sang with other orchestras, including those of Art Jarrett, Claude Thornhill, Pinky Tomlin, Orrin Tucker, Beasley Smith, and Glen Gray.

Sullavan's radio career began at WSM in Nashville, where she sang with Smith and his orchestra on the Mr. Smith Goes to Town program. After a network executive heard her singing there, he sent recordings to New York. and within a year she had become a regular singer on CBS. In August 1944, Radio Mirror magazine called her "one of that company's coming stars". Soon after passing her audition with CBS she had her own program, accompanied by Paul Baron and his orchestra, singing on Mondays, Wednesdays, and Fridays at 6:30 p.m. Eastern Time. The show debuted on June 18, 1943, and was expanded to five nights per week in August 1943. It ended on November 17, 1944. She sang on the Jack Pepper Show, which was a summer replacement radio program in 1944. In May 1945 she became the featured singer on The Durante-Moore Show on CBS. She joined Bob Crosby as his regular singing partner on his Wednesday night CBS radio program in May 1946.

During World War II, Sullavan frequently entertained American military personnel at Army and Navy camps and canteens. The men stationed at the Maritime Naval Training Station at Sheepshead Bay presented her with a scroll in recognition of her having performed there more than any other entertainer.

Sullavan was seen and heard in the soundie "Tico Tico" (released January 15, 1945). In behind-the-scenes film work, she was a ghost singer, including dubbing for Jean Peters in Love That Brute and for Virginia Mayo in A Song Is Born.

In 1944 Sullavan was in the cast of At Home, an experimental variety television program that was broadcast on CBS. She was the subject in one part of a CBS test of color TV in 1946, the first public demonstration of color TV by CBS that used live talent.

Sullavan, Morey Amsterdam, and Paul Baron were credited with authorship of the song "Rum and Coca-Cola", but they lost two lawsuits for copyright infringement of the song's lyrics and music. As a result of the suits, the three retained copyrights but had to pay Mohamed Khan for use of the lyrics and, with regard to the music, had to pay Maurice Baron, who had the copyright to a song with the same tune.

== Personal life ==
On September 18, 1941, Sullavan married George Sontag, who was the pianist for Tucker's orchestra when she began singing with that group.

== Critical response ==
The trade publication Variety reviewed Sullavan's performance at the Versailles in New York in June 1944, saying, "She requires schooling in rostrum or floor deportment, but there is no denying her ability at lilting a tune, whether it's a straight rhythm, ballad, or novelty number". The review commented that she focused more on singing into the microphone than on paying attention to the audience but added that she could change her approach.
