= Theodore St. John =

American screenwriter

Theodore St John (1906–1956) was an American writer, actor and director of films, radio and theatre. In 1953 he won a Best Motion Picture Story Oscar for 1952's The Greatest Show on Earth. His win was shared with Fredric M. Frank and Frank Cavett.

He served in the army from 1942 to 1946. He died in 1956 of self-inflicted stab wounds.

== Select credits ==
- Ghosts (1927) - actor in Broadway production
- The Greatest Show on Earth (1952) - screenplay
- Fort Algiers (1953) - screenplay
