= A Song Is Born =

1948 film by Howard Hawks

- Theatrical release poster
- Directed by: Howard Hawks
- Adaptation by: Harry Tugend (uncredited)
- Based on: "From A to Z" by Billy Wilder and Thomas Monroe
- Produced by: Samuel Goldwyn
- Starring: Danny Kaye; Virginia Mayo; Hugh Herbert; Benny Goodman; Tommy Dorsey; Louis Armstrong; Charlie Barnet; Lionel Hampton; Mel Powell
- Cinematography: Gregg Toland
- Edited by: Daniel Mandell
- Production company: Samuel Goldwyn Productions
- Distributed by: RKO Radio Pictures
- Release dates: October 19, 1948 (New York City); November 6, 1948 (United States)
- Running time: 113 minutes
- Country: United States
- Language: English
- Budget: $2.3 million
- Box office: $2.4 million (US and Canada rentals)

A Song Is Born is a 1948 American musical romantic comedy film directed by Howard Hawks and starring Danny Kaye and Virginia Mayo. It is a musical remake of Hawks' 1941 screwball comedy film Ball of Fire, starring Gary Cooper and Barbara Stanwyck. The film is based on the short story "From A to Z" by Billy Wilder and Thomas Monroe, adapted by Harry Tugend (uncredited), produced by Samuel Goldwyn, and released by RKO Radio Pictures.

Filmed in Technicolor, the film features a supporting cast of musicians including Benny Goodman (with Al Hendrickson as cameo), Tommy Dorsey, Louis Armstrong, Lionel Hampton, and Benny Carter. Other notable musicians playing themselves in the cast include Charlie Barnet (with Harry Babasin as cameo), Mel Powell, Louis Bellson, The Golden Gate Quartet, Russo and the Samba Kings, the Page Cavanaugh Trio, and Buck and Bubbles. Other actors include Hugh Herbert and Steve Cochran. Mary Field reprises her role as Miss Totten from Ball of Fire.

== Plot ==
At the Totten Foundation of Music in New York City, mild-mannered Professor Hobart Frisbee and his six fellow musicologists have been compiling a comprehensive music encyclopedia for nine years. When their sponsor Miss Totten and her lawyer visit the foundation, threatening to cut off their funding due to the mounting cost of the encyclopedia, the older musicologists take advantage of her infatuation with Hobart to convince her to continue financing their project. Shortly after Miss Totten leaves, two Black window washers arrive seeking help with a radio musical quiz show, and end up introducing the musicologists to several forms of popular music—including boogie woogie, swing, jive, jump, blues, two-beat Dixie, and rebop.

Realizing that his section of the encyclopedia is outdated, Hobart, the project's folk music expert, visits local nightclubs and invites an array of renowned jazz musicians to attend a round-table discussion at the foundation the following day. Hobart meets Honey Swanson, a seductive nightclub singer whose gangster boyfriend Tony Crow is wanted by the police for murder. Honey initially declines Hobart's invitation to join the research group, but after fleeing the nightclub to avoid the district attorney's subpoena to testify against Tony, she decides to hide out at the foundation, convincing Hobart to let her stay the night.

During the round-table discussion the next morning, Honey secretly meets with Tony's henchmen, Joe and Monte, who give her a diamond engagement ring from Tony, as he wants to marry her to prevent her from testifying against him. While hiding from the police, who are still looking for her, Honey teaches the professors about jam sessions. When the strict housekeeper, Miss Bragg, threatens to quit unless Honey leaves, Honey persuades Hobart to let her stay by confessing her attraction to him and introducing him to "yum yum" (i.e., a passionate kiss).

The next morning, the smitten Hobart proposes to Honey with an engraved engagement ring, but they are interrupted by a phone call from Tony, who identifies himself as "Daddy". Convinced that Tony is Honey's father, Hobart asks him for Honey's hand, and Tony uses the opportunity to persuade Hobart to bring Honey to Rancocas, New Jersey, so that her "invalid mother" can witness the wedding. Honey reluctantly agrees to Tony's plan, and after Miss Bragg reads a newspaper article about her and threatens to call the police, Honey knocks the housekeeper out and locks her in a closet.

En route to New Jersey with Honey and the professors, Hobart accidentally crashes his rental car, forcing the group to spend the night at an inn near Kingston. There, Honey calls to inform Tony of her location. Meanwhile, Miss Bragg escapes the closet and alerts the police. Hobart later walks into Honey's bungalow, believing it to be Professor Oddly's, while the lights are out and confesses her love for Honey, who responds by kissing him. However, Tony and his gang arrive at the inn and reveal the truth. Miss Bragg arrives with the police, and after sending them away, Hobart confronts Honey, who is wracked with guilt.

The next morning, Hobart and his colleagues despondently return to the foundation. Miss Totten and her lawyer arrive, announcing her decision to withdraw funding for the encyclopedia due to the negative publicity surrounding the foundation. Joe and Monte break in and hold everyone at gunpoint. Meanwhile, Honey refuses to marry Tony and proclaims her love for Hobart. While Tony forces Honey to go through the ceremony with the help of a hard-of-hearing justice of the peace in one room of the foundation, Joe and Monte hold the professors and their musician friends hostage in another.

Noticing a large drum precariously perched above Joe, Hobart organizes the musicians to perform a rousing rendition of "Flying Home", causing the drum to fall onto Joe's head, while one of the professors pulls a rug out from under Monte. Hobart rushes to the other room to stop the wedding and beats up Tony. Later, Honey expresses that she does not deserve to marry Hobart, but he reassures her by kissing her.

== Cast ==
- Danny Kaye as Professor Hobart Frisbee
- Virginia Mayo as Honey Swanson
- Benny Goodman as Professor Magenbruch
- Tommy Dorsey as himself
- Louis Armstrong as himself
- Lionel Hampton as himself
- Charlie Barnet as himself
- Mel Powell as himself
- Buck and Bubbles as themselves
- The Page Cavanaugh Trio as themselves
- The Golden Gate Quartet as themselves
- Russo and the Samba Kings as themselves
- Hugh Herbert as Professor Twingle
- Steve Cochran as Tony Crow
- J. Edward Bromberg as Dr. Elfini
- Felix Bressart as Professor Gerkikoff
- Ludwig Stossel as Professor Traumer
- O. Z. Whitehead as Professor Oddly
- Esther Dale as Miss Bragg
- Mary Field as Miss Totten
- Howland Chamberlin as Mr. Setter
- Paul Langton as Joe
- Sidney Blackmer as Adams
- Ben Welden as Monte
- Ben Chasen as Ben
- Peter Virgo as Louis
- Harry Babasin as himself
- Louie Bellson as himself
- Alton Hendrickson as himself

== Production ==
The working title of the film was That's Life. Danny Kaye's personal writer/composer, Sylvia Fine, who was also Kaye's wife, refused to take part in any more of his projects because Kaye had recently left her for actress Eve Arden. Kaye did not want anyone else writing songs for him, so he did not perform any songs in the film.

Hawks had little interest in remaking his own earlier film, and only came to work on it because of the $250,000 paycheck. When speaking of the film, he said, "Danny Kaye had separated from his wife, and he was a basket case, stopping work to see a psychiatrist [every] day. He was about as funny as a crutch. I never thought anything in that picture was funny. It was an altogether horrible experience." He also described Virginia Mayo's performance as "pathetic" and said, "She's not [Barbara] Stanwyck, I'll tell you that."

== Music ==
- "A Song Is Born"
- "Daddy-O"
  - Performed by Virginia Mayo (dubbed) and sung by Jeri Sullavan
- Words and music by Don Raye and Gene De Paul
- Orchestration by Sonny Burke
- Musical direction by Emil Newman and Hugo Friedhofer

== Release ==
A Song Is Born was the number-one film at the box office in the United States upon its release in November 1948, while Hawks' other film, Red River, was second. However, A Song Is Born never broke even, only earning approximately $2.4 million (equivalent to $32.2 million in 2025), while Red River went on to gross $4.1 million. It has since been released on home video in both VHS and DVD formats.
