= The Affairs of Susan =

1945 film by William A. Seiter

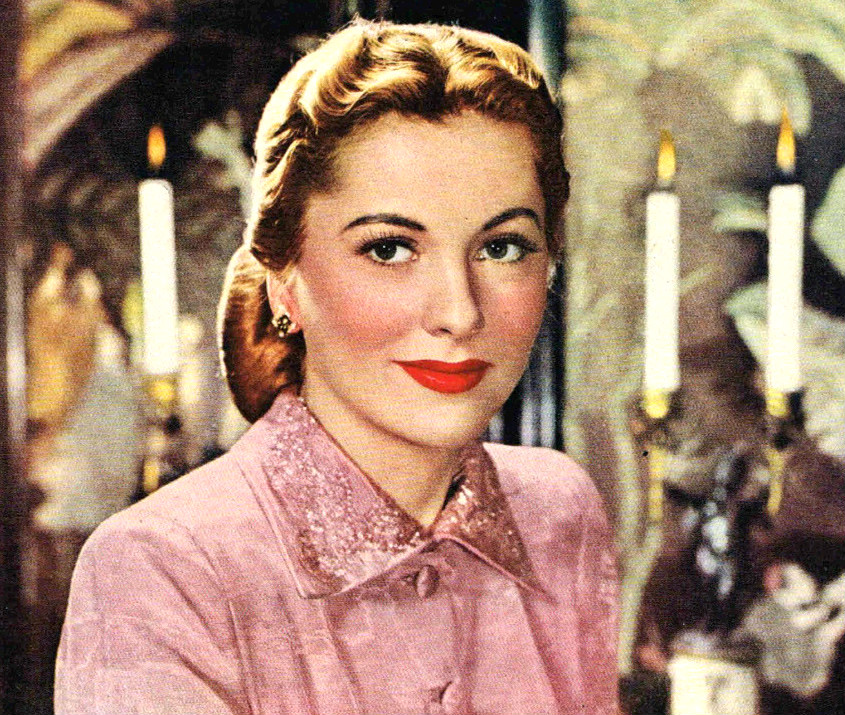
- Joan Fontaine in The Affairs of Susan
- Directed by: William A. Seiter
- Screenplay by: Thomas Monroe; László Görög; Richard Flournoy
- Story by: Thomas Monroe; László Görög
- Produced by: Hal Wallis
- Starring: Joan Fontaine; George Brent
- Cinematography: David Abel
- Edited by: Eda Warren
- Music by: Friedrich Hollaender
- Color process: Black and white
- Production company: Hal Wallis Productions
- Distributed by: Paramount Pictures
- Release date: July 8, 1945
- Running time: 110 minutes
- Country: United States
- Language: English

The Affairs of Susan is a 1945 American romantic comedy drama film directed by William A. Seiter and starring Joan Fontaine, Walter Abel, George Brent, Dennis O'Keefe and Don DeFore. It was distributed by Paramount Pictures. It is also known by the alternative title of Chameleon.

== Plot ==
Susan Darell, a successful dramatic actress, returns to New York City from a tour entertaining the troops overseas. She is about to marry Richard Aiken, even though they have only known each other for a few weeks. Then Richard discovers that Susan has an ex-husband (and her current Broadway producer) named Roger Berton and two other former boyfriends when he sees their pictures in her living room.

At a cocktail party, he meets all three, each of whom describes her as an entirely different person. Worried, he invites them all to dinner, where he asks them to tell him all they know about her. Roger is willing, but the other two start to walk out. However, when Roger starts reminiscing about Susan, they sit back down.

Roger meets Susan while on vacation in Rhode Island. When actress Mona Kent shows up, hoping to be cast as Joan of Arc in his next production, he flees by rowboat to an island. He talks a man into letting him board at his house for a while. He meets Susan, the man's niece, who lives there. Initially suspicious of her, he discovers that she is straightforward and honest and completely uninterested in acting. However, he thinks she is perfect to play Joan and makes her an actress, against her strong resistance. Then they fall in love and get married. Just before the premiere of Joan of Arc, Mona shows up and tries to sabotage it by getting a naive Susan drunk. Roger finds out in time and sobers her up. Susan draws rave reviews, but hardly anyone comes to see the play. Roger becomes repeatedly annoyed when Susan's complete honesty and forthrightness cause trouble for him. They divorce as a result.

Next up is Mike Ward, a wealthy lumberman from Montana. He meets Roger in a bar. When Roger sees how rich he is, he invites Mike to his office to discuss Mike investing in Roger's next show. A more sophisticated and less honest Susan barges in during the meeting, and taking a lesson from Mona, flatters Mike and takes him to lunch. Mike falls in love and begins proposing to her in a nightclub. Susan starts to let him down gently when Roger barges in and, assuming the worst (and wanting to reconcile with her), infuriates Susan into accepting Mike. However, Mike finds out about Susan's (fairly innocent) lying and breaks up with her.

Then novelist named Bill Anthony meets Susan in a park. Under Bill's influence, Susan turns into an intellectual. When Roger tells her that Bill does not believe in marriage, she does not trust him. She gets Bill drunk, knowing that when he is intoxicated he will agree to anything, and sets out to find a justice of the peace to marry them, but at the last moment, changes her mind. Back in the present, Bill regrets that she did not go through with it.

Reassured, Richard decides to go ahead with the marriage. However, Mike and Bill both propose to Susan again. She gently turns them down. Roger tells her that when they were first married, she was too young. Now she has grown up. She ultimately chooses him over Richard.

== Cast ==
- Joan Fontaine as Susan Darell
- George Brent as Roger Berton
- Dennis O'Keefe as Bill Anthony
- Walter Abel as Richard Aiken
- Don DeFore as Mike Ward
- Rita Johnson as Mona Kent
- Mary Field as Nancy
- Byron Barr as Chick
- Francis Pierlot as Uncle Jemmy
- Lewis L. Russell as Mr. Cusp
- Gordon Richards as Mr. Giddon

== Reception ==
The film was nominated for Academy Award for Best Story in the 18th Academy Awards, but lost to The House on 92nd Street.

Critic Bosley Crowther wrote in The New York Times, "Producer Hal Wallis should have condensed the whole romp into an hour or so and not the two hours which the picture takes to run its course." He thought all four male leads gave capable performances, but found Fontaine's to be "very uneven".
