= Frank Cavett =

American screenwriter

- Born: December 27, 1905; Jackson, Ohio, U.S.
- Died: March 25, 1973 (aged 67); Santa Monica, California, U.S.
- Occupation: Screenwriter

Frank Cavett (December 27, 1905 – March 25, 1973) was an American screenwriter. He won two Academy Awards and was nominated one more in the categories Best Screenplay and Best Motion Picture Story for the films Going My Way, Smash-Up, the Story of a Woman and The Greatest Show on Earth.

== Selected filmography ==
- Going My Way (1944; co-won with Frank Butler)
- Smash-Up, the Story of a Woman (1947; co-nominated with Dorothy Parker)
- The Greatest Show on Earth (1952; co-won with Fredric M. Frank and Theodore St. John)
