= Fredric M. Frank =

American screenwriter

Writer Fredric M. Frank (July 9, 1911 New York City - May 9, 1977 Los Angeles, California) was a favourite scribe of Cecil B. deMille and worked with him on several of his epic productions throughout the 1940s and 1950s including Unconquered, Samson and Delilah, The Greatest Show on Earth for which he won an Academy Award for Best Story (shared with Theodore St. John and Frank Cavett), and The Ten Commandments.

His last film was El Cid in 1961.
