= La Norma Fox =

Danish aerialist and trapeze artist (1926–2026)

La Norma
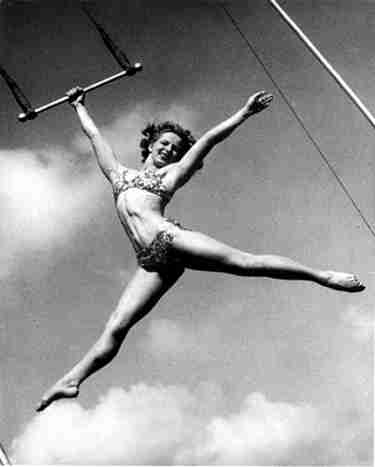
- La Norma performing circa 1950
- Born: Norma Nielsen; 9 February 1926; Randers, Denmark
- Died: 8 August 2026 (aged 100); Sarasota, Florida, US
- Occupations: Aerialist; Trapeze artist
- Years active: 1942–1974
- Spouse: André W. Fox

Norma Fox (née Nielsen; 9 February 1926 – 8 August 2026), also known as La Norma, was a Danish-born aerialist and trapeze artist who performed throughout Europe before moving to the United States with her husband, the Frenchman André W. Fox, in 1949. In 1952, she performed as a stand-in for Betty Hutton in the film The Greatest Show on Earth. La Norma retired in 1974 and resided in Sarasota, Florida, where a "Ring of Fame" marker records her circus achievements.

== Early life ==
Born in Randers, Jutland, on 9 February 1926, Norma Nielsen was the daughter of the cinema operator Laurits Nielsen and his wife Magda. From an early age, together with her siblings she performed circus acts in their back yard. When she was 14, she was noticed at the local ballet school by Emilie Altenburg who together with her daughter performed in a circus act advertised as the Florita Sisters. After discussing her intentions with Norma's parents, Altenburg took the child to Copenhagen where she was trained to become a trapeze artist under strict, almost slave-like conditions.

== Career ==
After making her debut at Varieté Maxim in Randers she received her stage name La Norma when aged 16 she performed at the Scala in Copenhagen. During the German occupation of Denmark, Altenburg took Norma to Norway and then to Sweden where she performed in Circus Altenburg and Circus Scott. After the war, in 1946 together with Altenburg, Norma toured Denmark with Circus Belli. There she met André Fox, her husband-to-be, who encouraged her to break away from Altenburg. The couple moved on to France where Norma performed an aerial act suspended from the Eiffel Tower. This led to a contract with Ringling Bros. and Barnum & Bailey Circus, bringing the couple to the United States. She worked with RBB&B from 1949 to 1951. In 1951, she doubled for Betty Hutton in the film ''The Greatest Show on Earth'']. For the next 20 years, she continued to perform in other American circuses. Fellow trapeze artist Tony Steele credits her as his inspiration for joining the circus.

== Personal life and death ==
After her son Gilbert became paralysed in a scooter incident, Fox retired from the circus in 1974. She trained young performers until the mid-1980s. Fox lived out her days in Sarasota's circus community, and a "Ring of Fame" marker records her achievements.

Fox died in Sarasota on 8 August 2026, at the age of 100.
