= Tiny Kline =

Hungarian-born circus performer

Tiny Kline (born Helén Deutsch, June 21, 1891 - July 5, 1964) was a Hungarian-born circus performer. She performed with Ringling Bros. and Barnum & Bailey and as Tinker Bell at Disneyland. Kline's most well-known act was the "slide for life," a variation of traditional iron jaw performance in which she slid down a wire from tall buildings or other structures by her teeth.

== Early life and career ==
In 1905, Kline immigrated to the United States with a dance troupe. New York port records indicate that she was born in Magyar, Hungary and was 15 years old when she arrived. She lived at the Clara de Hirsch home for immigrant girls. She started as a burlesque dancer and performed in clubs and music halls. Kline made headlines in 1912 when a Pittsburgh Press article titled "Witnesses forget and dancer gets off with costs," detailed a misdemeanor charge against the performer following "an alleged ultra-risqué performance in a singing hall in Bloomfield" earlier that year. The article stated that Kline was arrested for dancing in "what the authorities declared [sic] was too scanty attire." The witnesses could not corroborate the charges and Kline was allowed to go after paying her court fees.

=== Marriage to Otto Kline ===
In 1914, Kline moved on to perform in the Ringling Bros. and Barnum & Bailey Circus as Tiny Duchée. There, she met and later married rodeo trick rider Otto Kreinbrink (stage name Otto Kline). In April 1915 he fractured his skull during a performance at Madison Square Garden and died of injuries. After her husband's death, she began to use the name Tiny Kline. In 1917, on the second anniversary of Otto's death, Kline performed in the Roman standing race at the same venue, stating "we circus people have to learn to hide our sorrows under many bright colors. Otto has been dead two years, but I haven't found anything in life to take his place. That is why I wanted to learn to ride. I thought it might take me back to where he is."

=== Iron Jaw ===
In 1919, Kline began years of training for the iron jaw performance, after incurring fellow performer Lillian Leitzel grew angry at her for performing on the still rings, Leitzel's specialty. Kline eventually perfected her signature "slide for life" act, in which she would slide down a wire, typically from tall buildings or structure, by her teeth. One of her most notable slides for life occurred in 1932 when Kline slid from the top of the Hotel Edison to the roof of the Prospect Theatre in New York City's famed Times Square, a distance of more than 200 yards at a height of 27 stories. Kline was arrested after the spectacle and charged with disorderly conduct.

== Later life and death ==
In 1961, Walt Disney began a search for a flying Tinker Bell to wow crowds at Disneyland. Kline was hired to glide down a wire connecting the Matterhorn to Sleeping Beauty's Castle. She retired from playing Tinker Bell in 1964. Kline was scheduled to return as Tinker Bell that same year, but she died from stomach cancer before coming out of retirement.

At the time of her death Kline left the bulk of her estate to the Clara de Hirsch Home for Working Girls. She is buried in Inglewood Park Cemetery in Inglewood, Los Angeles, California. Her simple gravestone says "Tiny Helen Kline. Our Tinker Bell."
