= Charmienne Harker =

American actress (1924–2026)

- Born: May 13, 1924; Denver, Colorado, U.S.
- Died: October 14, 2026 (aged 102); Palos Verdes Estates, California, U.S.
- Occupation: Actress
- Years active: 1944–1959
- Spouses: Edward A. Salven (divorced) Julius Krauss (m. 1963)

Charmienne Harker (May 13, 1924 – October 14, 2026) was an American actress, model and dancer, who appeared in film and television during the 1940s and 1950s. She was known for her supporting roles in epic feature films by Cecil B. DeMille.

== Life and career ==
Harker was born in Denver, Colorado, on May 13, 1924, the only girl in a family of six boys. Her family moved to Hollywood when Harker was five years old, where she would go on to attend Hollywood High School before taking private drama lessons from Kathryn James.

Originally a professional model, Harker appeared in films such as Every Girl Should Be Married (1948), opposite Cary Grant. She had a minor supporting role in The Greatest Show on Earth (1952), playing Charmienne, a character that shared her name. Harker also worked as a stand-in for actress Hedy Lamarr, appearing in Samson and Delilah (1949).

Harker died near Palos Verdes Estates, California, where she had lived since 1973, on October 14, 2026, at the age of 102.

== Filmography ==
=== Film ===
- Violent Road (1958) – Margaret (uncredited)
- The Ten Commandments (1956) – Court Lady / Cretan Lady (uncredited)
- Foxfire (1955) – Rowena Whitman (uncredited)
- The French Line (1953) – Model in Hallway (uncredited)
- Affair with a Stranger (1953) – (uncredited)
- Angel Face (1953) – Miss Preston (uncredited)
- Son of Paleface (1952) – Bessie (uncredited)
- Meet Danny Wilson (1952) – Dance Director (uncredited)
- The Greatest Show on Earth (1952) – Charmienne (uncredited)
- Here Comes the Groom (1951) – Guest (uncredited)
- When Worlds Collide (1951) – Student (uncredited)
- The Lemon Drop Kid (1951) – Dancer (uncredited)
- Mr. Music (1950) – Party Guest (uncredited)
- Let's Dance (1950) – Mary (uncredited)
- The Milkman (1950) – Lana (uncredited)
- Union Station (1950) – Clerk (uncredited)
- Abbott and Costello in the Foreign Legion (1950) – Arab Girl (uncredited)
- The Secret Fury (1950) – Ethel (uncredited)
- Samson and Delilah (1949) – stand-in (uncredited)
- A Dangerous Profession (1949) – Cigarette Girl (uncredited)
- Every Girl Should Be Married (1948) – Miss King (uncredited)
- The Paleface (1948) – B-Girl (uncredited)
- The Velvet Touch (1948) – uncredited
- Race Street (1948) – Cigarette Girl at Turf Club (uncredited)
- If You Knew Susie (1948) – Showgirl (uncredited)
- My Wild Irish Rose (1947) – Chorine (uncredited)
- The Chinese Ring (1947) – Kelso's Stenographer (uncredited)
- Linda, Be Good (1947) – Cameo Girl (uncredited)
- When a Girl's Beautiful (1947) – Model (uncredited)
- Unconquered (1947) – Squaw (uncredited)
- Mrs. Parkington (1944 – Can-Can Dancer (uncredited)
- Bathing Beauty (1944) – Co-Ed (uncredited)

=== Television ===
- Tales of Wells Fargo (1 episode; 1959) – Mrs. Oliver
- Colt .45 (1 episode; 1958) – Mrs. Dixon
- Dragnet (1 episode; 1956)
- Sergeant Preston of the Yukon (1 episode; 1956) – Helen Townsend
- Death Valley Days (2 episodes; 1956) – Audrey Wade / Abbey Marshall
- Craig Kennedy, Criminologist (1 episode; 1952) – Ann Waller
- My Little Margie (1 episode; 1952) – Betty Fuller
- Schlitz Playhouse of Stars (1 episode; 1952)
