= Smash-Up, the Story of a Woman =

1947 film by Stuart Heisler

- Film poster
- Directed by: Stuart Heisler
- Written by: Frank Cavett; John Howard Lawson; Dorothy Parker; Lionel Wiggam
- Produced by: Walter Wanger
- Starring: Susan Hayward; Lee Bowman; Marsha Hunt; Eddie Albert
- Cinematography: Stanley Cortez
- Edited by: Milton Carruth
- Music by: Score: Frank Skinner; Songs: Jimmy McHugh (music); Harold Adamson (lyrics)
- Production company: Walter Wanger Productions
- Distributed by: Universal-International Pictures
- Release date: March 1947
- Running time: 103 minutes
- Country: United States
- Language: English
- Budget: $1,360,286
- Box office: $2,301,555

Smash-Up, the Story of a Woman, also called A Woman Destroyed, is a 1947 American drama film with elements of film noir that tells the story of a rising nightclub singer who marries another singer and becomes an alcoholic after sacrificing her career for him.

The film stars Susan Hayward, Lee Bowman, Eddie Albert and Marsha Hunt. The screenplay was written by John Howard Lawson based on a story written by Dorothy Parker, Frank Cavett and Lionel Wiggam. Produced by Walter Wanger under his personal contract with Hayward, the film was directed by Stuart Heisler. Ethel Wales appears in an uncredited part.

The film was nominated for Academy Awards for Best Actress in a Leading Role (Hayward) and Best Writing, Original Story.

Because the film contains a story similar to that of A Star Is Born, it was rumored to be a cryptic biography of Bing Crosby and his stormy first marriage to Dixie Lee. A scene that has been popular with critics and fans is the violent slapping and hair-pulling fight between rivals Hayward and Hunt in the ladies‘ powder room (a scene repeated by Hayward 20 years later in Valley of the Dolls).

This film is in the public domain.

== Plot ==
In a hospital, nightclub singer Angie Evans, her face bandaged, recounts the events that brought her there.

Angie becomes involved with aspiring singer Ken Conway. Her agent Mike Dawson helps Ken and piano accompanist Steve Anderson secure a spot on a radio show singing cowboy songs. Ken sings a ballad on the day that Angie, now his wife, gives birth to their daughter. Ken's performance earns him a new career opportunity.

Ken soon achieves great success, gaining popularity and wealth, while Angie stays home. With her career at a standstill, she begins to drink. Ken counts on her to present a sophisticated image for his new high-society friends and contacts, but her alcoholism worsens, so secretary Martha Gray comes to Ken's aid.

Angie is certain that Ken and Martha are having an affair. Steve tries to intervene on Angie's behalf, but he can see that Martha has fallen in love with Ken.

Angie neglects her child, continues to drink, and then creates a scene at a party. Ken asks for a divorce and custody. Mike helps Angie find work in a club. She is determined to stay sober in order to regain custody of her daughter. Instead, she finds herself in a bar and wakes the next morning in the apartment of strangers who had found her unconscious on their stairs.

Angie kidnaps her daughter from the park and takes her to a house in the country where Angie dutifully gives the child dinner and puts her to bed. After she sings her daughter to sleep, Angie forgets a lit cigarette in the room. She begins to drink and indulges in memories before the child's shouts finally alert her to the fire. Angie rescues her daughter from the flames but suffers serious facial burns.

Realizing that she has hit rock bottom, Angie is positive that she can move forward happily. Ken has talked with her doctor and wishes to try to support her.

== Cast ==
- Susan Hayward as Angie Evans (singing dubbed by Peg LaCentra)
- Lee Bowman as Ken Conway (singing dubbed by Hal Derwin)
- Eddie Albert as Steve Anderson
- Marsha Hunt as Martha Gray
- Carl Esmond as Dr. Lorenz
- Carleton G. Young as Fred Elliott
- Charles D. Brown as Michael Dawson
- Janet Murdoch as Miss Kirk, baby Angelica's nanny
- Sharyn Payne as Angelica "Angel" Conway
- Robert Shayne as Mr. Gordon
- Erville Alderson as Farmer at Fire (uncredited)
- Lee Shumway as Benson - Doorman (uncredited)
- Caren Marsh Doll as Bobby-Soxer (uncredited)

== Production ==
This was Hayward's first major role, and made her a star, earning her the first of five Academy Award nominations.

== Reception ==
In a contemporary review for The New York Times, critic Bosley Crowther wrote: "This irony of life might make for drama of a genuinely touching sort, as it did in that memorable picture of success and drunkenness, A Star Is Born. But, actually, in the writing, this complex tension has been so weakly drawn that the reason for the lady's dipsomania seems completely arbitrary and contrived. Furthermore, the writer, John Howard Lawson, has so muddled the lady with motherless love that the story becomes a wallow less in liquor than in mawkish sentiment."

According to Variety, the film earned $2 million in U.S. box office receipts in 1947.

The film lost $111,664 in its initial release.

== See also ==
- List of American films of 1947
