= László Görög (writer) =

Hungarian-American screenwriter

László Görög (born László Guttmann; September 30, 1903 – July 24, 1997) was a Hungarian-American screenwriter.

== Life and career ==
László Görög was born in Austria-Hungary. His mother's maiden name was Preisz. He emigrated to the United States in 1939. In 1942, he first worked in Hollywood as a screenwriter on an episode of Julien Duvivier's star-studded anthology film Tales of Manhattan. Before 1946, he had occasional jobs on feature films with various production companies. In 1945, he co-wrote The Affairs of Susan, for which he was nominated for an Academy Award for Best Story. From 1953 he worked frequently as a screenwriter, now mainly for the American television. In 1963 he retired from show business. He was married to his wife Helen until his death at the age of 93 years in Los Angeles.

Görög's stepgrandson is American comedian Adam Carolla.

== Selected filmography ==
- Tales of Manhattan (1942)
- The Affairs of Susan (1945)
- She Wouldn’t Say Yes (1945)
- Murder in the Music Hall (1946)
- The Mole People (1956)
- The Land Unknown (1957)
- Earth vs. the Spider (1958)
- Too Soon to Love (1960)
- Of Love and Desire (1963)
