= Circus Vargas =

American circus

Circus Vargas 2016

Circus Vargas is an American traveling circus based in California. It was built with the intent of bringing an old time circus to everyone; it is billed as one of the world's biggest traveling circuses still using a big top tent. The circus produces a circus show throughout the western United States.

== History ==
Clifford E. Vargas (1924–1989) founded Circus Vargas in 1969. Vargas was influenced to restart the big top tent circus from his childhood fascination with glamour and thrills of old circuses. He was a frequent spectator with big top tent circuses that visited his hometown of Livermore, California every year. Vargas, the son of Portuguese immigrants, grew up on a farm near Livermore. He got a job in Chicago as the ticket seller, doorman and later ringmaster. Vargas saved money, and in 1972 purchased controlling interest in the Miller-Johnson Circus. The show was small to start, but grew. Circus Vargas at its peak was using the largest circus tent, the size of a football field, which took thirty men seven hours to raise.

After the death of Clifford Vargas in 1989, the show management went to Jack Bailey, longtime vice president of the company; and Joseph Muscarello, the show's general manager. Bailey sold his interest to concession manager Roland Kaiser. Kaiser and Muscarello, both longtime friends of Vargas and management executives with the show, began managing the circus. Faced with rising costs and declining attendance, Kaiser and Muscarello changed the circus into a more intimate one-ring 'European style' circus. They ran the circus until retiring in 2003.

Circus Vargas then went on hiatus. In 2005, Roland Kaiser's stepdaughter, Katya Arata Quiroga (née Arata) and husband Nelson Quiroga bought Circus Vargas from him. They continued to own the circus as of September 2023. In 2010, Circus Vargas discontinued its animal acts.

As a result of the COVID-19 pandemic, Circus Vargas closed to the public in 2020, but resumed their circus production in 2021.

== Television and movie appearances ==
Note: this list is not exhaustive.

- Water for Elephants (2011)
- MTV "True Life" (2008)
- La Feria de Los Ninos (Univision)
- The Nick Cannon Show (2002)
- Dismissed (MTV, 2001)
- Primera Edicion (Univision)
- Quantum Leap, "Leaping In Without a Net" (1990)
- Card Sharks (1988)
- Kidsongs "A Day at the Circus" (1987)
- "Side Show" (1981 TV movie)
