= Bazenheid =

Coordinates: 47°24′44″N 9°04′07″E

A view over Bazenheid in 1948

Bazenheid (Allemannic German: Bàzehäid) is a village in the municipality of Kirchberg, located in the canton of St. Gallen.

As of 2013, a population of 3560 lives there and it contains approximately 30% foreigners.

It was first mentioned in 779 as Pacinuueidu.

Football team FC Bazenheid play there.
