= Iron jaw (circus) =

Traditional aerial circus act

The Iron Jaw is a traditional aerial circus act.

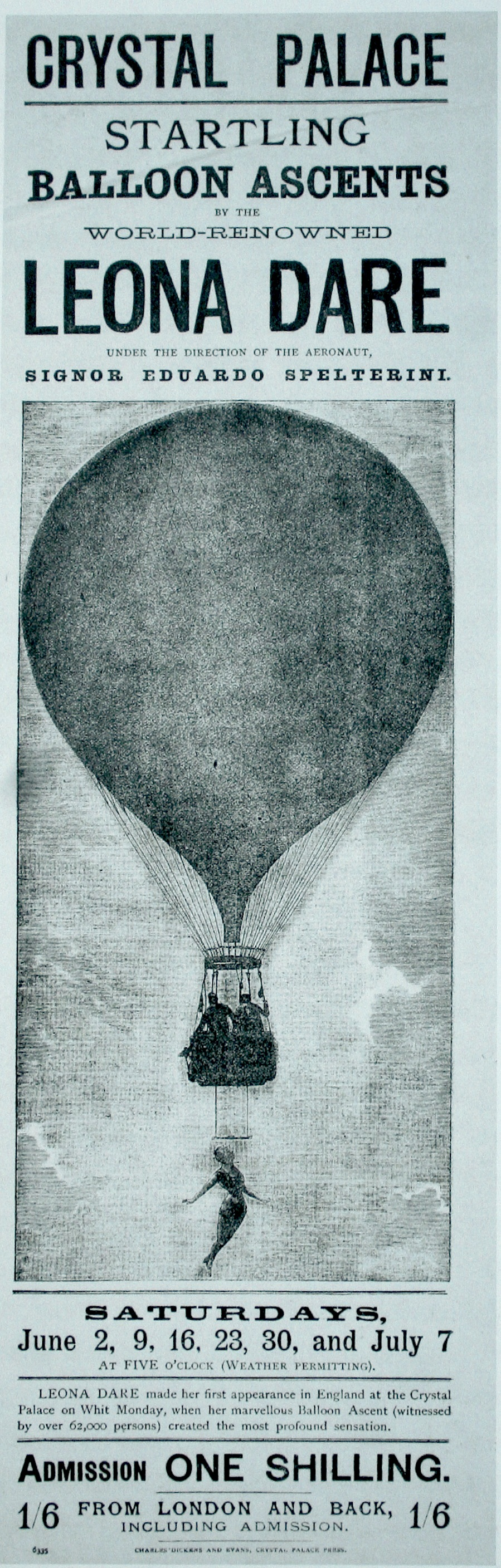
Newspaper advertisement for Leona Dare's ascents from Crystal Palace in London.

The act consists of a performer raised into the air by a cable, trapeze or other similar apparatus, supported only by a bit clamped between their teeth. Depending on the apparatus the bit is attached to, the performer can alternately swing in circles around the ring below or spin wildly in place, controlling speed by alternately extending their arms and legs out or bringing them in close to their body to speed up (as a result of the conservation of angular momentum).

The act is frequently referred to as the Human Butterfly due to the removable wings which traditionally adorn the performer's costume.

It is also known as the 'Jaws of Life'.

Tiny Kline, in a footnote to her memoir, describes Iron Jaw as "(a) holding one's grip by the teeth bulldog-fashion, suspended in the air; (b) lifting another person's weight; (c) juggling furniture or tugging an automobile- in short, any work involving teeth-power."

== Notable performers ==
- Leona Dare (American, 1854–1922)
- Miss La La (German, b. 1858)
- Tiny Kline (American, 1891–1964)
- The Curzon Sisters (American, 1906–1920)
- The Tybell Sisters (American, 1910–1926)
- Nik & Erendira Wallenda hold the world record for the highest Iron Jaw act at 350 ft (110 m). Erendira broke her husband's world record in Canada.
- Igor Zaripov holds the Guinness world 3 times for heaviest weight.
- Morgan Barbour (British-American, 2024) became the first woman to suspend herself and two other artists from her teeth (175.5kg).
- Roberta Bobbie King. Became Youngest Iron Jaw artist in the world. she first performed at the age of 16 for Solvay Brussels LTD third biggest chemical company in the world. She lifted a 9st cast iron weight for a Dental Laboratory & Solvay promotion. This took place in 2017 at the Wessex Dental Laboratory Poole Dorset England U.K.
