= List of crooners =

The following is a list of crooners and includes artists who have been described as a crooner at some point in their career. Crooners are singers who sing in a soft, intimate style made possible by the introduction of microphones and amplification.

== 1920–1969 ==
- Al Bowlly
- Al Martino
- Alan Dale
- Andy Russell
- Andy Williams
- Arthur Prysock
- Billy Eckstine
- Bing Crosby
- Bobby Darin
- Bobby Rydell
- Bobby Short
- Brook Benton
- Buddy Clark
- Buddy Greco
- Charles Aznavour
- Cheo Feliciano
- Dean Martin
- Desi Arnaz
- Dick Farney
- Dick Haymes
- Dick Powell
- Dick Todd
- Domenico Modugno
- Don Cornell
- Ed Ames
- Eddie Fisher
- Eddy Arnold
- Elvis Presley
- Engelbert Humperdinck
- Fabian
- Frank Sinatra
- Frank Sinatra Jr.
- Frankie Laine
- Gene Austin
- Jack Jones
- James Darren
- Jerry Vale
- Jimmy Roselli
- Johnny Dorelli
- Johnny Hartman
- Johnny Marvin
- Johnny Mathis
- Julius La Rosa
- Lucho Gatica
- Matt Monro
- Mel Tormé
- Merv Griffin
- Mike Douglas
- Nat King Cole
- Neil Diamond
- Nick Lucas
- Pat Boone
- Paul Anka
- Perry Como
- Ricky Nelson
- Robert Goulet
- Roy Orbison
- Rudy Vallée
- Russ Columbo
- Sam Browne
- Sammy Davis Jr.
- Sergio Franchi
- Silvio Berlusconi
- Sneeze Achiu
- Tom Jones
- Tony Bennett
- Tony Clifton
- Tony Martin
- Val Doonican
- Val Rosing
- Vaughn De Leath
- Vaughn Monroe
- Vic Damone
- Wayne Newton
- Whispering Jack Smith

== 1970–present ==
- Alejandro Fernández
- Alex Turner
- Anthony Strong
- Barry Manilow
- Barry White
- Bryan Ferry
- Camilo Sesto
- Chris Isaak
- Dennis Van Aarssen
- Harry Connick, Jr
- jschlatt
- Justin Timberlake
- Mark Eitzel
- Michael Bublé
- Morrissey
- Neil Hannon
- Sam Smith
- Seth MacFarlane
- Tommy Ward
- The Bum Bum Bums

== See also ==
- Traditional pop
- Easy listening
