= Al Martino =

American singer (1927–2009)

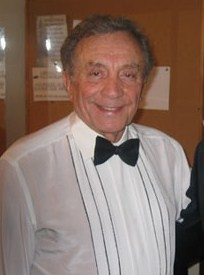
- Martino in 2005

Background information
- Born: Jasper Cini; October 7, 1927; Philadelphia, Pennsylvania, U.S.
- Died: October 13, 2009 (aged 82) Springfield, Pennsylvania, U.S.
- Genres: Jazz; swing; traditional pop; easy listening
- Occupations: Singer; actor
- Years active: 1948–2009
- Labels: Capitol; Ember
- Spouses: Jenny Furini; Gwendolyn Wenzel; Judi Stilwell (m. 1968–2009)
- Children: 3

Jasper Cini (October 7, 1927 – October 13, 2009), known professionally as Al Martino, was an American Jazz and traditional pop and standards singer. He had his greatest success as a singer between the early 1950s and mid-1970s, being described as "one of the great Italian American pop crooners", and became known as an actor, particularly for his role as singer Johnny Fontane in The Godfather.

== Early life ==
Jasper Cini was born in Philadelphia, Pennsylvania, to Gasparino (also anglicised as "Jasper"; 1905–1958) and Carmela M. Cini (née Grilli; 1905–1998), one of five siblings. His father and maternal grandfather were immigrants from Nereto in the Italian region of Abruzzo. He aspired to become a singer, emulating artists such as Al Jolson and Perry Como, and seeing the success of a family friend, Alfredo Cocozza, who had changed his name to Mario Lanza.

== Career ==
After serving with the U.S. Navy in World War II, during which he took part and was wounded in the Iwo Jima invasion, Cini began his singing career. Encouraged by Lanza, he adopted the stage name Al Martino, based on the name of his good friend Lorraine Losavio's husband Alfred Martin Cianfrani, and began singing in local nightclubs; coincidentally Martin of Tours is also the patron saint of Martino's ancestral hometown of Nereto in Italy. In 1948, he moved to New York City, and in 1951 his first release was issued by the Jubilee label, "Heaven Help Me (I'm in Love)", coupled with "Hurry Home to Me". The following year, he won first place on Arthur Godfrey's Talent Scouts television program with a performance of Como's hit "If".

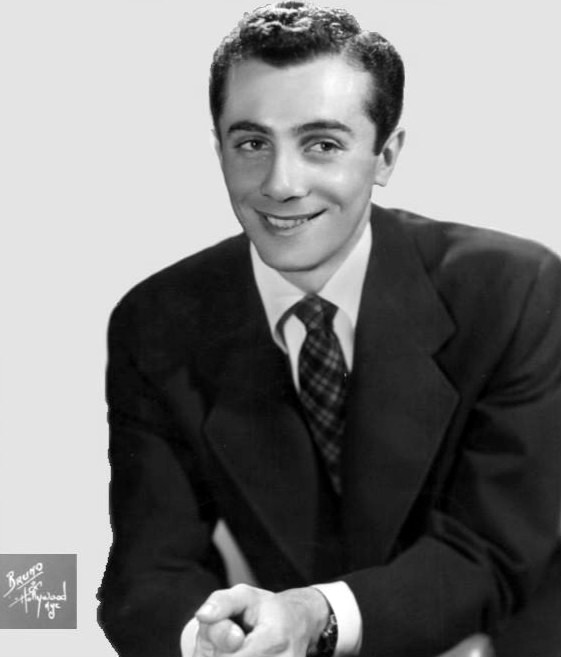
Martino in 1952 when "Here in My Heart" topped the music charts

As a result, he won a recording contract with the Philadelphia-based independent record label BBS, where he recorded "Here in My Heart". Lanza's label, RCA Victor, had asked Lanza to record the song, but Martino called Lanza and pleaded with him to let Martino's version have a clear chance. The song spent three weeks at No. 1 on the US pop chart in June 1952, earning Martino a gold disc, and later in the year, it was number one in the first UK Singles Chart, published by the New Musical Express on November 14, 1952, putting him into the Guinness Book of World Records. "Here in My Heart" remained in the top position for nine weeks in the UK.

The record's success led to a deal with Capitol Records, and he released three more singles: "Take My Heart", "Rachel", and "When You're Mine" through 1953, all of which hit the U.S. top 40. However, his success also attracted the attention of the Mafia, which bought out Martino's management contract and ordered him to pay $75,000 as a safeguard for their investment. After making a down-payment to appease them, he moved to Britain. His popularity allowed him to continue to perform and record successfully in the UK, headlining at the London Palladium and having six further British chart hits in the period up to 1955, including "Now" and "Wanted". However, his work received no exposure back in the US.

In 1958, after the intervention of a family friend, Martino was allowed to return to the U.S. and resume his recording career, but he faced difficulties in re-establishing himself, especially with the arrival of rock and roll. In 1959, Martino signed with 20th Century Fox Records; his deal scored him two albums, and four singles released, none of which was a major hit. The success of his 1962 album The Exciting Voice of Al Martino secured him a new contract with Capitol, and was followed by a mostly Italian-language album, The Italian Voice of Al Martino, which featured his version of the then internationally popular song "Al di là". He also made several high-profile television appearances, helping to re-establish his visibility.

In 1963, he had his biggest U.S. chart success with "I Love You Because", a cover of Leon Payne's 1950 country music hit. Arranged by Belford Hendricks, Martino's version went to number three on the U.S. Billboard Hot 100 chart, and number one on the Easy Listening chart. The album of the same name went top 10 in the Billboard 200. Martino had four other U.S. top 10 hits in 1963 and 1964 — "Painted, Tainted Rose" (1963), "I Love You More and More Every Day", "Tears and Roses", and "Silver Bells" (all 1964). He also sang the title song for the 1964 film, Hush, Hush, Sweet Charlotte. One of his biggest hits was "Spanish Eyes", achieving several gold and platinum discs for sales. Recorded in 1965, the song reached number five on the UK Singles chart when reissued in 1973. The song, with a tune by Bert Kaempfert originally titled "Moon Over Naples", is among the 50 most-played songs worldwide.

Martino's run of chart success faded after the mid-1960s, although many of his records continued to reach the U.S. Hot 100. Another later hit was a disco version of "Volare" (also known as "Nel blu, Dipinto di Blu"). In 1976, it reached number one on the Italian and Flemish charts, and was in the top 10 in Spain, the Netherlands, and France, as well as in many other European countries. In 1993, Martino recorded a new studio album with German producer Dieter Bohlen (former member of pop duo Modern Talking, producer of international artists such as Chris Norman of Smokie, Bonnie Tyler, Dionne Warwick, Engelbert or Errol Brown of Hot Chocolate). The single "Spanish Ballerina" (written in Bohlen's europop sound) reached number 93 in the German single charts.

=== Acting ===
Apart from singing, Martino played the role of Johnny Fontane in the 1972 film The Godfather, as well as singing the film's theme, "Speak Softly Love". Martino had been told about the character by a friend who had read the eponymous novel and felt Martino represented the character of Johnny Fontane. Martino contacted producer Albert S. Ruddy, who initially gave him the part. Martino was stripped of the part, however, after Francis Ford Coppola came on board as director and awarded the role to singer Vic Damone. Martino, in turn, went to Russell Bufalino, his godfather and a crime boss, who then orchestrated the publication of various news articles that claimed Coppola had been unaware of Ruddy having given Martino the part.

Damone eventually dropped the role because he did not want to provoke the Bufalino crime family (in addition, Damone felt he was being paid too little for the role). Ultimately, the part of Johnny Fontane was given to Martino. He played the same role in The Godfather Part III and The Godfather Trilogy: 1901–1980 (the television miniseries that combines The Godfather and The Godfather Part II into one film).

Martino later returned to acting, playing aging crooner Sal Stevens in the short film Cutout, which appeared in film festivals around the world in 2006.

== Personal life ==
Martino was married first to Jenny Furini; then to Gwendolyn Wenzel; and, finally, to Judi Stilwell, to whom he was married at the time of his death. He had three children, including television producer Alison Martino.

== Death ==
Martino died from a heart attack on October 13, 2009, at his home in Springfield Township, Delaware County, Pennsylvania, six days after his 82nd birthday. He was buried at Holy Cross Cemetery in Culver City, California.

== Awards and honors ==
- 2009 – inducted into the Hit Parade Hall of Fame.
- Guinness Book of Records for first No. 1 record in the U.K.

== Filmography ==
Year	Title	Role
1972	The Godfather	Johnny Fontane
1990	The Godfather Part III	Johnny Fontane

== Discography ==
=== Studio albums ===
Album list: Chart positions:

- 1959: Al Martino (20th Century Fox)
- 1960: Swing Along With Al Martino (20th Century Fox)
- 1962: The Exciting Voice of Al Martino (U.S. No. 109) Capitol Records
- 1962: The Italian Voice of Al Martino (U.S. No. 57)
- 1963: When Your Love Has Gone (20th Century Fox)
- 1963: I Love You Because (U.S. No. 7)
- 1963: Painted, Tainted Rose (U.S. No. 9)
- 1963: Love Notes
- 1963: Sings Great Italian Love Songs
- 1964: A Merry Christmas (U.S. Christmas No. 8)
- 1964: I Love You More and More Every Day/Tears and Roses (U.S. No. 31)
- 1964: Living a Lie (U.S. No. 13)
- 1965: My Cherie (U.S. No. 19)
- 1965: Somebody Else is Taking My Place (U.S. No. 42)
- 1965: We Could (U.S. No. 41)
- 1966: Spanish Eyes (U.S. No. 8)
- 1966: Think I'll Go Somewhere and Cry Myself to Sleep (U.S. No. 116)
- 1966: This is Love (U.S. No. 57)
- 1967: Daddy's Little Girl (U.S. No. 23)
- 1967: This Love for You (U.S. No. 99)
- 1967: Mary in the Morning (U.S. No. 63)
- 1968: Love is Blue (U.S. No. 56)
- 1968: This is Al Martino (U.S. No. 129)
- 1968: Wake Up to Me Gentle
- 1969: Jean (U.S. No. 196)
- 1969: Sausalito (U.S. No. 189)
- 1970: Can't Help Falling in Love (U.S. No. 184)
- 1970: My Heart Sings (U.S. No. 172)
- 1972: Love Theme from 'The Godfather' (U.S. No. 138)
- 1972: Summer of '42 (U.S. No. 204)
- 1973: Country Style
- 1974: I Won't Last a Day Without You
- 1975: To the Door of the Sun (U.S. No. 129)
- 1976: In Concert: Recorded With the Edmonton Symphony Orchestra (live) RockyRock
- 1976: Sing My Love Songs
- 1978: The Next Hundred Years
- 1978: Al Martino Sings (20th Century Fox)
- 1978: Al Martino
- 1982: All of Me (MovieTone)
- 1990: Quando, Quando, Quando (Dynamic)
- 1991: Al Martino: In Concert (Prestige)
- 1993: The Voice to Your Heart; produced by Dieter Bohlen in Germany (Dino Music)
- 2000: Style (Varèse Sarabande)
- 2006: Come Share the Wine (Sin-Drome)
- 2011: Thank You

=== Compilations ===
- 196?: Romantic World of Al Martino (Capitol)
- 1965: That Old Feeling (MovieTone)
- 1966: Don't Go to Strangers (Pickwick)
- 1968: Al Martino (Guest Star)
- 1968: The Best of Al Martino (U.S. No. 108)
- 1970: Here in My Heart/Yesterday
- 1971: I Wish You Love/Losing You
- 1971: Al Martino (3 LP Set)
- 1978: Time After Time (Springboard)
- 1990: Greatest Hits (Curb)
- 1992: Capitol Collectors Series
- 1996: 20 Great Love songs (Disky)
- 1998: Touch of Class (Disky)
- 1999: The Legendary Al Martino (Metro)
- 1999: The Al Martino Collection: I Love You Because (Razor & Tie)
- 1999: I Love You Because/My Cherie
- 2000: Hits of Al Martino
- 2004: Essential Al Martino (Fuel 2000)
- 2005: Ultimate Al Martino
- 2006: We Could/Think I'll Go Somewhere And Cry Myself to Sleep
- 2006: Very Best of Al Martino
- 2007: An Introduction to Al Martino (Varèse Sarabande)
- 2012: Makin' Whoopee (Sepia)
- 2013: Take My Heart (Jasmine)
- 2018: The Singles Collection: 1952-1962 (Acrobat)

=== Singles ===
Year	Titles (A-side/B-side) Both sides from same album except where indicated	U.S. Billboard	U.S. Cash Box	U.S. AC	UK	Album
1952	"Here in My Heart" b/w "I Cried Myself to Sleep"	1	2	—	1	Non-album tracks
1952	"Take My Heart" b/w "I Never Cared"	12	—	—	9	Non-album tracks
1952	"I've Never Seen" b/w "Say You'll Wait for Me"	—	—	—	—	Non-album tracks
1953	"Now" b/w "In All This World"	—	25	—	3	Non-album tracks
1953	"Rachel" b/w "One Lonely Night"	30	21	—	10	Non-album tracks
1953	"Here in My Arms" b/w "There's Music in You"	—	—	—	—	Non-album tracks
1953	"When You're Mine" b/w "This Night I'll Remember"	27	—	—	—	Non-album tracks
1953	"All I Want Is a Chance" b/w "You Can't Go On Forever Breaking My Heart"	—	—	—	—	Non-album tracks
1954	"Melancholy Serenade" b/w "Way, Paesano (Uei...Paesano)"	—	—	—	—	Non-album tracks
1954	"Wanted" b/w "There'll Be No Teardrops Tonight"	—	—	—	4	Non-album tracks
1954	"The Story of Tina" b/w "Say It Again"	—	—	—	10	Non-album tracks
1954	"Don't Go to Strangers" b/w "When"	—	—	—	—	Non-album tracks
1955	"The Man from Laramie" b/w "To Please My Lady"	—	—	—	19	Non-album tracks
1955	"Love Is Eternal" b/w "The Snowy, Snowy Mountains"	—	—	—	—	Non-album tracks
1956	"A Love to Call My Own" b/w "The Girl I Left in Rome"	—	—	—	—	Non-album tracks
1957	"I'm Sorry" b/w "I'm a Funny Guy"	—	—	—	—	Non-album tracks
1958	"Here in My Heart" b/w "Two Lovers"	—	—	—	—	Non-album tracks
1959	"I Can't Get You Out of My Heart" b/w "Two Hearts Are Better Than One"	44	43	—	—	Non-album tracks
1959	"Darling, I Love You" b/w "The Memory of You"	63	52	—	—	Non-album tracks
1960	"Summertime" b/w "I Sold My Heart" (Non-album track)	—	—	—	49	Swing Along With Al Martino
1960	"Dearest (Cara)" b/w "Hello My Love"	—	106	—	—	Non-album tracks
1960	"Only the Broken Hearted" b/w "Journey to Love"	—	—	—	—	Non-album tracks
1960	"Our Concerto" b/w "In My Heart of Hearts"	—	—	—	—	Non-album tracks
1960	"Come Back to Me" b/w "It's All Over But the Crying"	—	—	—	—	Non-album tracks
1961	"Little Boy, Little Girl" b/w "My Side of the Story"	109	92	—	—	Non-album tracks
1961	"Here in My Heart" (re-recording) b/w "Granada"	86	102	17	—	The Exciting Voice Of Al Martino
1961	"Pardon" b/w "Another Time, Another Place"	—	—	—	—	Non-album tracks
1962	"There's No Tomorrow" b/w "The Memory of You"	—	—	—	—	Non-album tracks
1962	"Love, Where Are You Now (Toselli Serenade)" b/w "Exodus"	119	—	—	—	The Exciting Voice of Al Martino
1962	"Because You're Mine" b/w "Make Me Believe"	—	—	—	—	The Exciting Voice of Al Martino
1963	"I Love You Because" b/w "Merry-Go-Round"	3	3	1	48	I Love You Because
1963	"Painted, Tainted Rose" b/w "That's The Way It's Got to Be"	15	19	3	—	Painted, Tainted Rose
1963	"Living a Lie" b/w "I Love You Truly" (from Painted, Tainted Rose)	22	23	8	—	Living A Lie
1964	"My Side of the Story" b/w "It's All Over But the Crying"	—	—	—	—	Non-album tracks
1964	"I Love You More and More Every Day" b/w "I'm Living My Heaven with You"	9	11	3	—	I Love You More and More Every Day
1964	"Tears and Roses" b/w "A Year Ago Tonight" (Non-album track)	20	18	7	—	I Love You More and More Every Day
1964	"Always Together" /	33	41	4	—	We Could
1964	"Thank You for Loving Me"	118	96	—	—	Non-album tracks
1964	"I Can't Get You Out of My Heart" (reissue) b/w "Come Back to Me"	99	—	—	—	Non-album tracks
1964	"We Could" b/w "Sunrise to Sunrise"	41	44	6	—	We Could
1964	"Silver Bells" b/w "You're All I Want for Christmas"	—	145	—	—	A Merry Christmas
1965	"My Heart Would Know" b/w "Hush...Hush, Sweet Charlotte"	52	50	11	—	Somebody Else Is Taking My Place
1965	"Somebody Else Is Taking My Place" /	53	64	11	—	Somebody Else Is Taking My Place
1965	"With All My Heart"	122	99	—	—	Somebody Else Is Taking My Place
1965	"My Cherie" /	88	79	26	—	My Cherie
1965	"Ramona"	—	tag	—	—	Painted, Tainted Rose
1965	"Forgive Me" b/w "What Now, My Love" (from My Cherie)	61	73	7	—	Spanish Eyes
1966	"Spanish Eyes" b/w "Melody of Love" (From My Cherie)	15	16	1	5 ^{A}	Spanish Eyes
1966	"Think I'll Go Somewhere and Cry Myself to Sleep" b/w "Hello Memory"	30	33	2	—	Spanish Eyes
1966	"Wiederseh'n" b/w "The Minute You're Gone"	57	61	3	—	Think I'll Go Somewhere and Cry Myself to Sleep
1966	"Just Yesterday" b/w "By the River of the Roses" (from Spanish Eyes)	77	71	12	—	This Is Love
1966	"The Wheel of Hurt" b/w "Somewhere in This World"	59	57	12	—	Daddy's Little Girl
1967	"Daddy's Little Girl" b/w "Devotion" (From This Love for You)	42	46	2	—	Daddy's Little Girl
1967	"Mary in the Morning" b/w "I Love You and You Love Me"	27	27	1	—	Daddy's Little Girl
1967	"More Than the Eye Can See" b/w "Red Is Red" (from Mary in the Morning)	54	47	1	—	This Is Al Martino
1967	"A Voice in the Choir" b/w "The Glory of Love" (from This Is Al Martino)	80	81	5	—	Non-album track
1968	"Love Is Blue" b/w "I'm Carryin' the World on My Shoulders"	57	60	3	—	Love Is Blue
1968	"Lili Marlene" b/w "Georgia"	87	82	7	—	Love Is Blue
1968	"Wake Up to Me Gentle" b/w "If You Must Leave My Life"	120	125	21	—	Wake Up To Me Gentle
1969	"I Can't Help It" b/w "I Can See Only You"	97	93	10	—	Wake Up To Me Gentle
1969	"Sausalito" b/w "Take My Hand for a While"	99	62	13	—	Sausalito
1969	"I Started Loving You Again" ^{B} b/w "Let Me Stay Awhile" (from Jean)	86	74	19	—	Non-album track
1970	"Can't Help Falling in Love" b/w "You're All the Woman That I Need"	51	57	5	—	Can't Help Falling In Love
1970	"Walking in the Sand" b/w "One More Mile (and Darlin', I'll Be Home)" (from Can't Help Falling in Love)	123	—	9	—	To the Door of the Sun
1970	"True Love Is Greater Than Friendship" b/w "The Call"	—	110	33	—	My Heart Sings
1971	"Come Into My Life" b/w "One Pair of Hands" (from My Heart Sings)	—	104	30	—	To the Door of the Sun
1971	"Losing My Mind" b/w "Too Many Mornings" (Non-album track)	—	—	39	—	Summer of '42
1971	"This Summer Knows" b/w "More Now Than Ever"	—	—	—	—	Summer of '42
1972	"Speak Softly Love" b/w "I Have But One Heart"	80	81	24	—	Love Theme from 'The Godfather
1972	"Canta Libre" b/w "Take Me Back"	—	—	37	—	Non-album tracks
1973	"Hey Mama" b/w "If I Give My Heart to You" (Non-album track)	—	—	—	—	The Very Best Of Al Martino
1973	"Daddy Let's Play" b/w "Mary Go Lightly (Como Un Nino)" (from To the Door of the Sun)	—	—	—	—	Country Style
1975	"To the Door of the Sun" b/w "Mary Go Lightly (Como Un Nino)"	17	21	7	—	To the Door of the Sun
1976	"Volare" b/w "You Belong to Me"	33	41	9	—	Sing My Love Songs
1976	"My Thrill" b/w "The More I See You"	—	—	43	—	Sing My Love Songs
1976	"Sing My Love Song" (With The Mike Curb Congregation) b/w "May I Have the Next Dream with You"	—	—	24	—	Sing My Love Songs
1977	"Kentucky Morning" b/w "Sweet Marlorene"	—	110	26	—	The Next Hundred Years
1978	"The Next Hundred Years" b/w "After the Lovin'"	49	55	6	—	The Next Hundred Years
1978	"One Last Time" b/w "Here I Go Again"	—	—	44	—	The Next Hundred Years
1979	"Torero" b/w "Now That I Found You"	—	—	—	—	Non-album tracks
1980	"Almost Gone"; B-side unknown	—	—	—	—	Non-album tracks
1981	"Look Around (You'll Find Me There)" b/w "More Than Ever Now"	—	—	—	—	Non-album tracks
1982	"You and I" b/w "If I Should Love Again"	—	—	—	—	Non-album tracks
1982	"What Your Love Did for Me" b/w "Warm Is When You Touch Me"	—	—	—	—	Non-album tracks

- ^{A} "Spanish Eyes" reached No. 5 in the UK on re-issue in 1973.
- ^{B} "I Started Loving You Again" also peaked at No. 69 on Hot Country Songs.

== See also ==
- List of people from Philadelphia
- List of Italian American actors
- List of Italian American entertainers
- List of acts who appeared on American Bandstand
- List of artists who reached number one on the U.S. Adult Contemporary chart
- List of artists who reached number one on the UK Singles Chart
- List of Capitol Records artists
- List of crooners
