= Tommy Ward (singer) =

American singer and musician

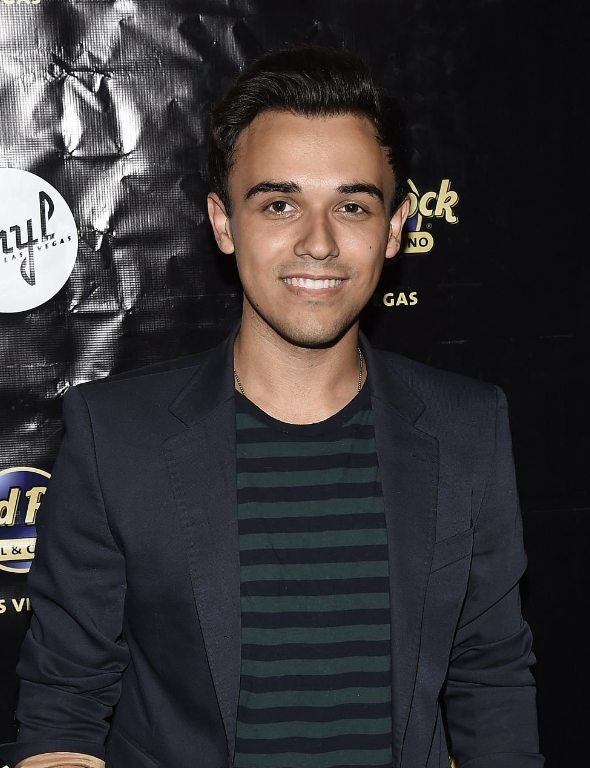

Background information
- Born: September 19, 1995 (age 29); Houston, Texas
- Genres: Traditional Pop, Jazz, Big Band
- Instrument: Vocals
- Years active: 2013-present
- Labels: Le Coq Records
- Website: tommywardmusic.com

Tommy Ward (born September 19, 1995) is an American singer and musician. He is a crooner and performs songs from the Great American Songbook.

== Biography ==
Tommy Ward was born in Houston, Texas. He was raised in Las Vegas, Nevada. He attended Faith Lutheran Middle & High School. He began performing in theatre and musicals at the age of 15. Ward's early exposure to music was influenced by his grandfather who exposed him to big band, jazz, and singers like Frank Sinatra and Tony Bennett. He has been featured in shows with Clint Holmes, Michael Bublé, Matt Goss, Jeff Civillico, Mac King, and Vladimir Kush.

== Career ==
Tommy Ward began performing professionally at 16. He graduated from Las Vegas Academy of the Arts where he met Frankie Moreno who was teaching a masterclass for up-and-coming songwriters. In 2013, Moreno made Ward, and his band, the opening act for his headlining show at the Stratosphere. He subsequently opened for Louie Anderson during his residency at the Plaza Hotel & Casino.

In 2014, Larry Ruvo, a prominent business executive and the founder of the Cleveland Clinic Lou Ruvo Center for Brain Health, introduced Ward to Quincy Jones. This culminated in Ward signing a management deal with Quincy Jones Productions. Jones has described Tommy Ward as "the epitome of great music" likening him to Frank Sinatra.

In 2019, Tommy signed a record deal with Le Coq Records and released From This Moment On an EP featuring Bill Cunliffe, John Patitucci, and Marvin Smith.

Ward and country singer Mark Winston Kirk recorded a cover and music video of Home by Michael Bublé, which was uploaded to Facebook on August 20th, 2020, and received 3 million views in the first 22 days.

== Discography ==
- Forget Me Not (2019)
- Merry Christmas (2019)
- Home (2020)
- It Had To Be You (2021)
- From This Moment On (2021)
- Don't Get Around Much Anymore (2023)

== Television ==
In 2022, Ward was featured in the Peacock mini-series A Friend of the Family, produced by NBCUniversal. In Season 1, Episode 3 "The Gift of Tongues," Ward and his band played Barnyard Boogie by Louis Jordan and Unforgettable by Irving Gordon, popularized by Nat King Cole. The lead actors in the scene, Jake Lacy and Anna Paquin, perform a choreographed dance to Ward's music.
