= Think I'll Go Somewhere and Cry Myself to Sleep =

Single by Al Martino

from the album Spanish Eyes
- B-side: "Hello Memory"
- Released: February 1966
- Genre: Country-pop
- Length: 2:44
- Label: Capitol; 5598
- Songwriter: Bill Anderson

Al Martino singles chronology
"Spanish Eyes" (1965)	"Think I'll Go Somewhere and Cry Myself to Sleep" (1966)	"Wiederseh'n" (1966)

"Think I'll Go Somewhere and Cry Myself to Sleep" is a song written by popular singer-songwriter Bill Anderson and most notably recorded by Al Martino, whose Capitol Records released it as a single in early 1966. It made chart appearances in the US on pop and adult-oriented charts.

== Al Martino version ==
=== Background and release ===
Al Martino first broke out as a singer in the 1950s, recording for several labels. By the 1960s, Martino had a hard time getting records on the charts, but 1963's "I Love You Because" gave him a comeback, continuing through the 60s. In 1965 itself, Martino achieved one of his biggest hits with "Spanish Eyes". Capitol Records scheduled to release "Think I'll Go Somewhere and Cry Myself to Sleep" for February 1966, previously a country hit in '65. It was backed by a ballad written by Russ Faith, "Hello Memory" on the B-side, which was lifted from his Spanish Eyes LP released also in February. Pete DeAngelis conducted and arranged the chorus and orchestra on both sides, with production by Tom Morgan.

=== Critical reception ===
Professional ratings
Review scores
Source	Rating
Record World	4/5 stars
Billboard	Favorable (Spotlight Single)
Cashbox	Favorable (Pick of the Week)

The single was met with a positive critical reception upon its release. Billboard magazine said that the song "from the pen of Bill Anderson gets a warm, emotional reading by Martino," adding: "With the same hit ingredients as 'Spanish Eyes,' it should hit the chart hard and fast." Cashbox reviewed the single in mid-February and wrote that "Al Martino comes up with this top-drawer follow-up," saying that this "This one's a tender, easy-going, lyrical country-styled tearjerker about an unhappy fella who's singing the blues 'cause his gal jilted him." Record World magazine gave the track four stars, saying that "Country flavor here gives special tang to the new Martino cut," calling people to "Watch it climb again."

=== Chart performance ===
"Think I'll Go Somewhere and Cry Myself to Sleep" was another single by Martino that made the pop top-40, continuing the momentum in his career. It debuted on the Billboard Hot 100 on March 12, 1966, reaching No. 30 during an eight-week run on it. The track entered the Cashbox Top 100 Singles chart in the issue dated March 5, 1966, peaking at a higher No. 33 during its nine-week stay on it. The song also nearly topped the Billboard Easy Listening chart, rising to the No. 2 position during an eleven-week run on the chart in February–May 1966.

=== Track listing ===
7" single (Capitol 5598, 1966)
No.	Title	Writer(s)	Performance rights handled by	Length
1.	"Think I'll Go Somewhere and Cry Myself to Sleep"	Bill Anderson	Broadcast Music, Inc.	2:44
2.	"Hello Memory"	Russ Faith	ASCAP	2:28

=== Personnel ===
All credits are adapted from the liner notes of "Think I'll Go Somewhere and Cry Myself to Sleep".

- Al Martino – vocals
- Tom Morgan – producer
- Pete DeAngelis – arranger, conductor

== Charts ==
Chart performance for "Think I'll Go Somewhere and Cry Myself to Sleep"
Chart (1966)	Peak position
US Billboard Hot 100	30
US Billboard Easy Listening	2
US Cashbox Top 100 Singles	33
