= I Love You Because (album) =

Studio album by Al Martino
- Released: July 7, 1963
- Recorded: 1963
- Genre: Easy listening
- Length: 30:42
- Label: Capitol
- Producer: Voyle Gilmore

Al Martino chronology
When Your Love Has Gone (1963)	I Love You Because (1963)	Painted, Tainted Rose (1963)

Singles from I Love You Because
- 1. "I Love You Because" Released: March 4, 1963

Professional ratings
Review scores
Source	Rating
New Record Mirror	4/5 stars

I Love You Because is the sixth album by American recording artist Al Martino. It peaked at number seven on the Billboard Top LPs & Tape chart in 1963. Its biggest hit was "I Love You Because", which peaked at number one on the adult contemporary chart on May 25, 1963, and later peaked at number three on the Billboard Hot 100 on June 1, 1963.

== Track listing ==
Side one

1. "I Love You Because" – 2:40
2. "Bouquet of Roses" – 2:17
3. "I Really Don't Want to Know" – 2:43
4. "Lonely Drifter" – 2:00
5. "It's a Sin" – 2:23
6. "Losing You" – 2:52

Side two

1. "Still" – 2:49
2. "If I Never Get to Heaven" – 2:27
3. "You Win Again" – 2:02
4. "Merry-Go-Round" – 2:21
5. "Just Call Me Lonesome" – 2:57
6. "Take These Chains from My Heart – 2:28

== Charts ==
Chart (1963)	Peak position
US Billboard 200	7
