= Faith Lutheran Middle School & High School =

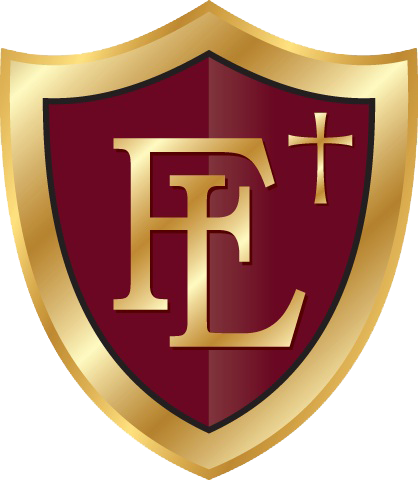

Location
- 2015 South Hualapai Way; Las Vegas, Nevada 89117; United States; 36°9′14″N 115°19′0″W

Information
- Type: Private, Coeducational
- Religious affiliation: Lutheran Church–Missouri Synod
- Established: 1979
- Grades: 6–12
- Enrollment: 2,225
- Colors: Maroon and gold
- Nickname: Crusaders
- Website: www.faithlutheranlv.org

Faith Lutheran Middle School & High School is a private Christian college-preparatory school located in Summerlin, Nevada. The school, which was founded in 1979, serves grades 6-12 and is affiliated with the Lutheran Church–Missouri Synod.

The school is the largest non-public school in Nevada, with over 2,000 students.

== History ==
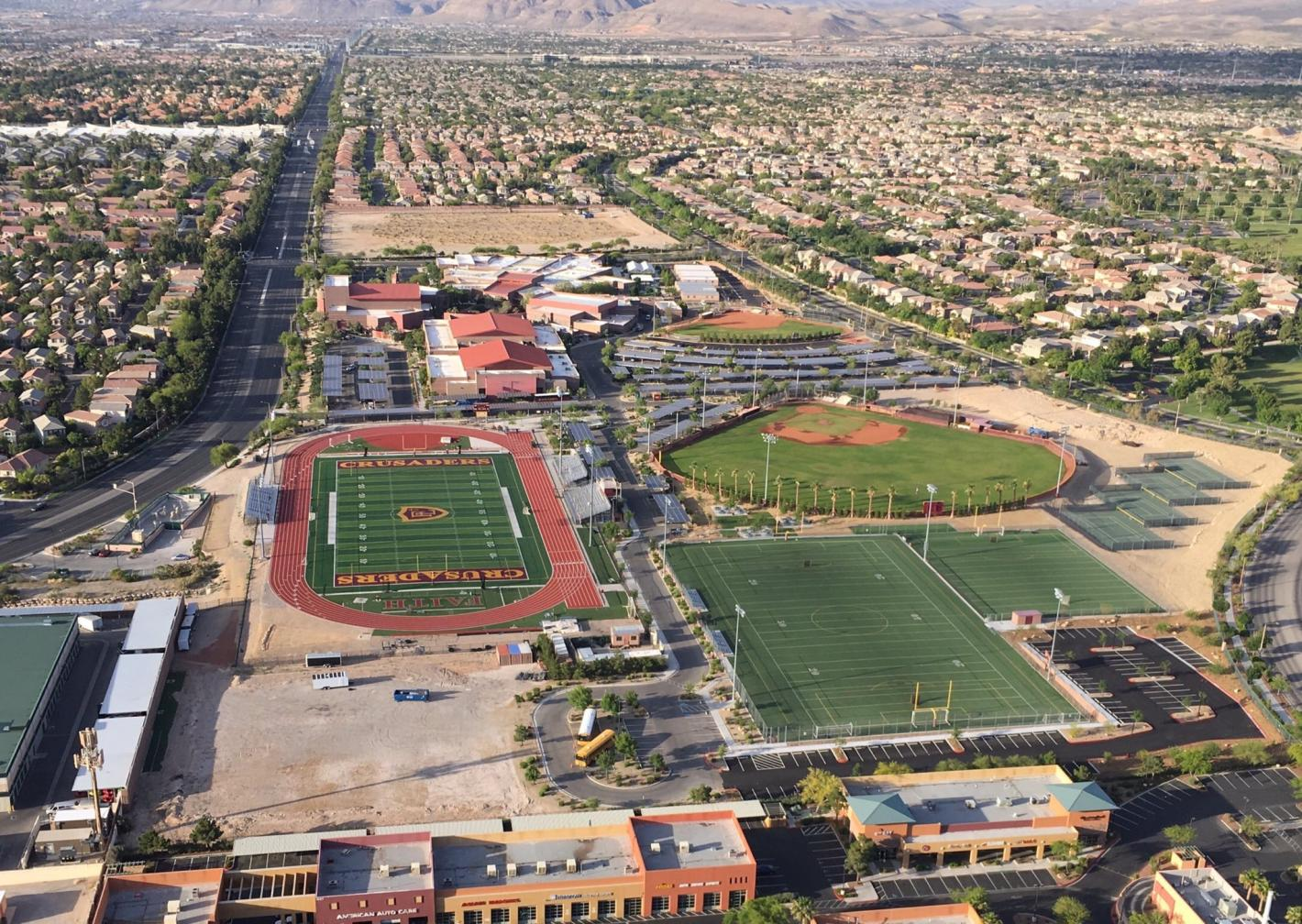
Faith Lutheran campus in 2019

Faith Lutheran was founded in 1979.

In 2017, the school added a 1,381-square-foot (128.3 m^{2}) classroom complex which included the Academy of Business & Entrepreneurship and the Academy of Film and Broadcast.

In 2019, Faith Lutheran was the first school in Nevada to have a varsity hockey team.

During the COVID-19 pandemic in 2020, the school's graduation was at the Las Vegas Motor Speedway and students took a lap after receiving their diplomas. In December 2020, the school broke ground on a new $3.4 million dollar tennis complex on campus.

In 2020, the school opened a flight school, with the $1.1 million Odor Family Flight Academy complex being constructed in 2022 which includes FAA-approved simulators and partnership with 702 Aviation at North Las Vegas Airport.

In 2021, the school became the first in Nevada to send a team to the CyberPatriot national finals.

In 2024, the school broke ground on a two story, nearly 100,000 square foot extension called the Hooks Family Innovation & Technology Center. Set to open for the 2026-2027 school year, the 32 classroom space will feature classrooms for e-sports, robotics, environmental sciences, additional math and science classrooms, and an auto shop.

== Extracurricular activities ==
=== Athletics ===
Faith Lutheran's athletics compete in Division 5A of the Nevada Interscholastic Activities Association. The school mascot is a Crusader.

The hockey team practices and plays at City National Arena.

- Fall sports: football, volleyball, cross country, girls' golf, soccer, tennis
- Winter sports: basketball, wrestling, hockey
- Spring sports: baseball, softball, boys' golf, track, swimming, lacrosse

=== Men's State Championships ===
Baseball

2003, 2004, 2005, 2007, 2013, 2014

Basketball

2003, 2005, 2006, 2007, 2008

Cross country

2002, 2003

Football

2013, 2026

Golf

2007, 2009, 2014, 2015, 2016

Lacrosse

2017

Soccer

2022

Tennis

2021, 2024, 2026

Track and field

1994, 1995, 2004, 2009, 2015, 2023

=== Women's State Championships ===
Basketball

2013, 2016

Cross country

1998, 1999, 2000, 2001

Golf

2004, 2012, 2013, 2014, 2015

Soccer

2015, 2019, 2022

Tennis

2014, 2026

Track and field

1998, 2001, 2002, 2009, 2013, 2014, 2015

Volleyball

2013, 2014, 2015

Swimming

2022, 2023

== Notable alumni ==
- Bowe Becker, Olympic gold medalist
- Brenna Jordan, YouTube personality
- Dalton Kincaid, professional football player
- Dylan Kwasniewski, former professional NASCAR driver and Vice President of Colliers International
- John Molchon, professional football player
- Tommy Ward, musician and singer
