= Moon over Naples =

1964 single by Bert Kaempfert

Single by Bert Kaempfert

from the album The Magic Music of Far Away Places
- B-side: "The Moon is Making Eyes"
- Released: 1965
- Recorded: September 1964
- Length: 2:35
- Label: Polydor
- Songwriter: Bert Kaempfert

Bert Kaempfert singles chronology
"Three O'Clock in the Morning" (1965)	"Moon over Naples" (1965)	"Holiday for Bells" (1965)

"Moon over Naples" is a 1965 instrumental composed and recorded by German bandleader Bert Kaempfert. The instrumental version reached No. 6 on Billboard's Adult Contemporary chart. It won a BMI Award in 1968.

Vocal versions of the song have been recorded as "Spanish Eyes" with lyrics by Eddie Snyder and Charles Singleton. The most notable of these was released by Al Martino, which topped Billboard's Easy Listening chart for 4 weeks in 1966. It is one of the most recorded songs with over 500 versions released in various languages.

== Background ==
"Moon over Naples" was composed by Bert Kaempfert. It was the first track on his album, The Magic Music of Far Away Places, for Decca Records and released as a single in 1965. In 1968, "Moon Over Naples" earned Kaempfert one of five BMI Awards that year; the other awards were for his compositions "Lady", "Sweet Maria", "Strangers in the Night" and "The World We Knew (Over and Over)" with a posthumous BMI Award given September 16, 2003.

Two different sets of lyrics were added to the tune by Charles Singleton and Eddie Snyder. In one, "Moon over Naples" was written as a Neapolitan song, and this vocal version was recorded by Sergio Franchi in 1965, but the song did not chart. In another set of lyrics, the composition became a song about a Mexican woman, and the song title was changed to "Spanish Eyes". Both lyricists are credited in these two versions.

== Charts ==
Moon over Naples

Chart (1965–1966)	Peak position
Austria (Ö3 Austria Top 40)	2
Belgium (Ultratop 50 Flanders)	4
Belgium (Ultratop 50 Wallonia)	15
Netherlands (Dutch Top 40)	18
US Billboard Hot 100	59
US Adult Contemporary (Billboard)	6
West Germany (GfK)	18

== "Spanish Eyes" ==
The Austrian singer Freddy Quinn was the first artist who recorded "Spanish Eyes" in 1965 with English lyrics written by Eddie Snyder and Charles Singleton. Quinn was a friend of Kaempfert who was involved in the production of Quinn's hit song "Die Gitarre und das Meer". Quinn's recording of "Spanish Eyes" was released in the United States in 1965 by Polydor. However, as the single by Quinn was rising in Billboard's regional charts, it was pulled from the market due to a dispute over the rights to the song between Polydor and Kaempfert's label Decca.

=== Al Martino version ===
"Spanish Eyes"

Single by Al Martino

from the album Spanish Eyes
- B-side: "Melody Of Love"
- Released: 1965
- Recorded: 1965
- Venue: New York
- Genre: Easy listening
- Length: 2:45
- Label: Capitol Records
- Songwriters: Bert Kaempfert; Charles Singleton; Eddie Snyder
- Producer: Tom Morgan

Al Martino singles chronology
"Forgive Me" (1965)	"Spanish Eyes" (1965)	"Think I'll Go Somewhere and Cry Myself To Sleep" (1966)

According to Al Martino, Kaempfert was interested for him to record the song, and sent him a copy of the instrumental version of "Moon over Naples", which Martino thought had the potential to be a hit. However, Martino did not like the lyrics of a vocal version he later heard, and told Kaempfert's publisher so. Singleton and Snyder, the original lyricists, were employed to rewrite the lyrics. Martino, satisfied with the new lyrics, contacted Kaempfert to request that he come and help with the recording in New York because he liked the sound of Kaempfert's recording. Martino recorded the song as "Spanish Eyes", with Kaempfert also playing on the record.

"Spanish Eyes" was released in the late 1965 in the United States, and it reached number 15 on the Billboard Hot 100 and spent four weeks atop the Billboard Easy Listening chart in early 1966. This vocal version was also a hit in Europe, where it sold an estimated 800,000 copies in Germany.

It appeared on the UK Singles Chart twice, first peaking at number 49 in 1970. Later in 1973, a deejay decided to play the song, and it received a strong response from the audience, and the song was re-released. It reached number five in August 1973.

==== Charts ====
Chart (1965–1966)	Peak position
Austria (Ö3 Austria Top 40)	3
Belgium (Ultratop 50 Flanders)	1
Belgium (Ultratop 50 Wallonia)	47
Netherlands (Single Top 100)	13
US Billboard Hot 100	15
US Adult Contemporary (Billboard)	1
West Germany (GfK)	3
Chart (1970)	Peak position
UK Singles (Official Charts)	49
Chart (1973)	Peak position
UK Singles (OCC)	5

=== Other versions ===
- As "Spanish Eyes", the song was performed by diverse artists, among them Bing Crosby, Charlie Rich, Elvis Presley, Wayne Newton, Andy Williams (in his 1967 album, Born Free), Earl Grant (on his Spanish Eyes album on August 1, 1967) and Faith No More.
- A cover by Willie Nelson and Julio Iglesias peaked at number 8 on the Billboard Hot Country Singles chart in 1988.
- Engelbert Humperdinck recorded the song for his 1968 album A Man Without Love. In 2013, vocal group Il Divo recorded the song together with Humperdinck. Produced by Alberto Quintero, it was included in the album Engelbert Calling released on September 30, 2014.
- Devang Goud released a single cover version https://music.apple.com/in/song/blue-spanish-eyes/1604474511 <https://www.youtube.com/watch?v=dmu_RupBhYk>

== Other language versions ==
- Ivo Robić recorded a German version titled "Rot ist der Wein", which reached No. 14 on the West German chart in 1966. Robić also recorded a version in Serbo-Croat.
- The song has been recorded in French as "Tes yeux" (Luis Mariano), "Tous ces voyages" (Lucky Blondo), and "Vivre au soleil" (Nana Mouskouri). It was recorded as "Occhi spagnoli" in Italian, and "Spanska Ögon" in Swedish.

== See also ==
- List of number-one adult contemporary singles of 1966 (U.S.)
