= Cleveland Clinic Lou Ruvo Center for Brain Health =

Research Center in Nevada, United States

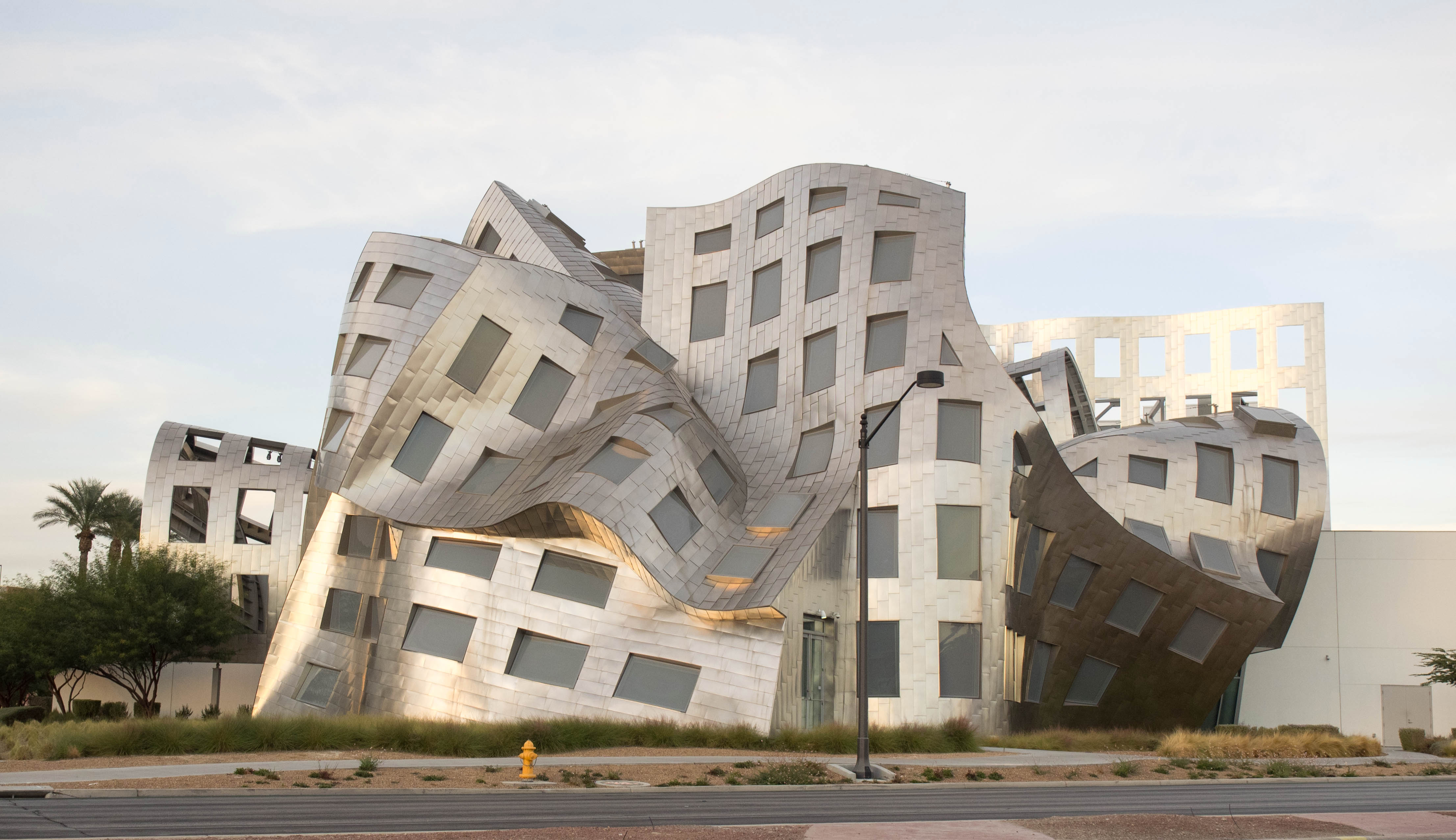
- Interactive map of the Cleveland Clinic; Lou Ruvo Center for Brain Health area

General information
- Type: Research Center
- Location: 36°10′2.50″N 115°9′16.50″W, 888 West Bonneville Avenue; Las Vegas, Nevada 89106; United States
- Construction started: February 9, 2007
- Completed: July 13, 2009 (patient care); May 21, 2010 (official completion)
- Cost: est. $100 million
- Owner: Keep Memory Alive

Design and construction
- Architecture firm: Gehry Partners
- Structural engineer: WSP Cantor Seinuk
- Civil engineer: G.C. Wallace
- Main contractor: The Whiting-Turner Contracting Company

The Cleveland Clinic Lou Ruvo Center for Brain Health (LRCBH) opened on May 21, 2010, in Las Vegas, Nevada. It is operated by the Cleveland Clinic and was designed by Frank Gehry.

== History ==
Keep Memory Alive (also known as KMA) was founded by Larry Ruvo, senior managing partner of Southern Wines and Spirits, in memory of his father, Lou Ruvo, a victim of Alzheimer's disease, together with his wife Camille, Mirage Resorts CEO Bobby Baldwin (who also lost his father to Alzheimer's disease), and Bobby Baldwin's wife Donna. KMA supports the mission of the Lou Ruvo Center for Brain Health and has held several star-studded galas, attended by celebrities and notables from around the world. It has become one of Las Vegas's most important charity initiatives and a key participant in the fight against Alzheimer's disease.

Since its inception, the event has raised more than $20 million towards achieving its goal – the realization of the Lou Ruvo Center for Brain Health. Funds committed by such supporters as the Spector Family Foundation, the Roland and Terri Sturm Foundation, Steinberg Diagnostics, the Hard Rock Hotel and Casino and America Online were utilized for the construction and continued operation of this state-of-the-art facility. The Cleveland Clinic Lou Ruvo Center for Brain Health is a specialized outpatient neurological facility dedicated to research, clinical treatment, and education regarding various brain disorders. The center's primary areas of focus include Alzheimer's disease and related dementias, multiple sclerosis and neuroimmunological disorders, and movement disorders such as Parkinson's and Huntington's disease.

== Design ==
The ceremonial groundbreaking of the Lou Ruvo Center for Brain Health occurred on February 9, 2007. Dignitaries who attended the groundbreaking ceremonies for the $70 million project included founder Larry Ruvo, Frank Gehry, federal Senators Harry Reid and John Ensign; federal Representatives Shelley Berkley, Jon Porter and Dean Heller, Governor Jim Gibbons, Las Vegas Mayor Oscar Goodman, former Governor Kenny Guinn, California Governor Arnold Schwarzenegger, Kevin Spacey, and John Cusack.

The Gehry design was described as "riotously sculptural" with opposing sections that allude to "the classic left-brain, right-brain dichotomy". Others, however, suggested that it was an example of modern architecture unmoored from aesthetics, a "city unto itself" and "hideously awful". It was described as the "most distinctive" building in Las Vegas in 2018.

== Operation ==
The center operates as an outpatient treatment and research facility in downtown Las Vegas on land deeded to Keep Memory Alive, the fund raising arm of LRCBH, by the City of Las Vegas as part of its 61 acres (25 ha) Symphony Park. The center is approximately 65,000 sq ft (6,000 m^{2}) and includes 13 examination rooms, offices for health care practitioners and researchers, a "Museum of the Mind", and a community auditorium. The center also serves as the headquarters for Keep Memory Alive, the Las Vegas Alzheimer's Association and the Las Vegas Parkinson's Disease Association.

== Gallery ==
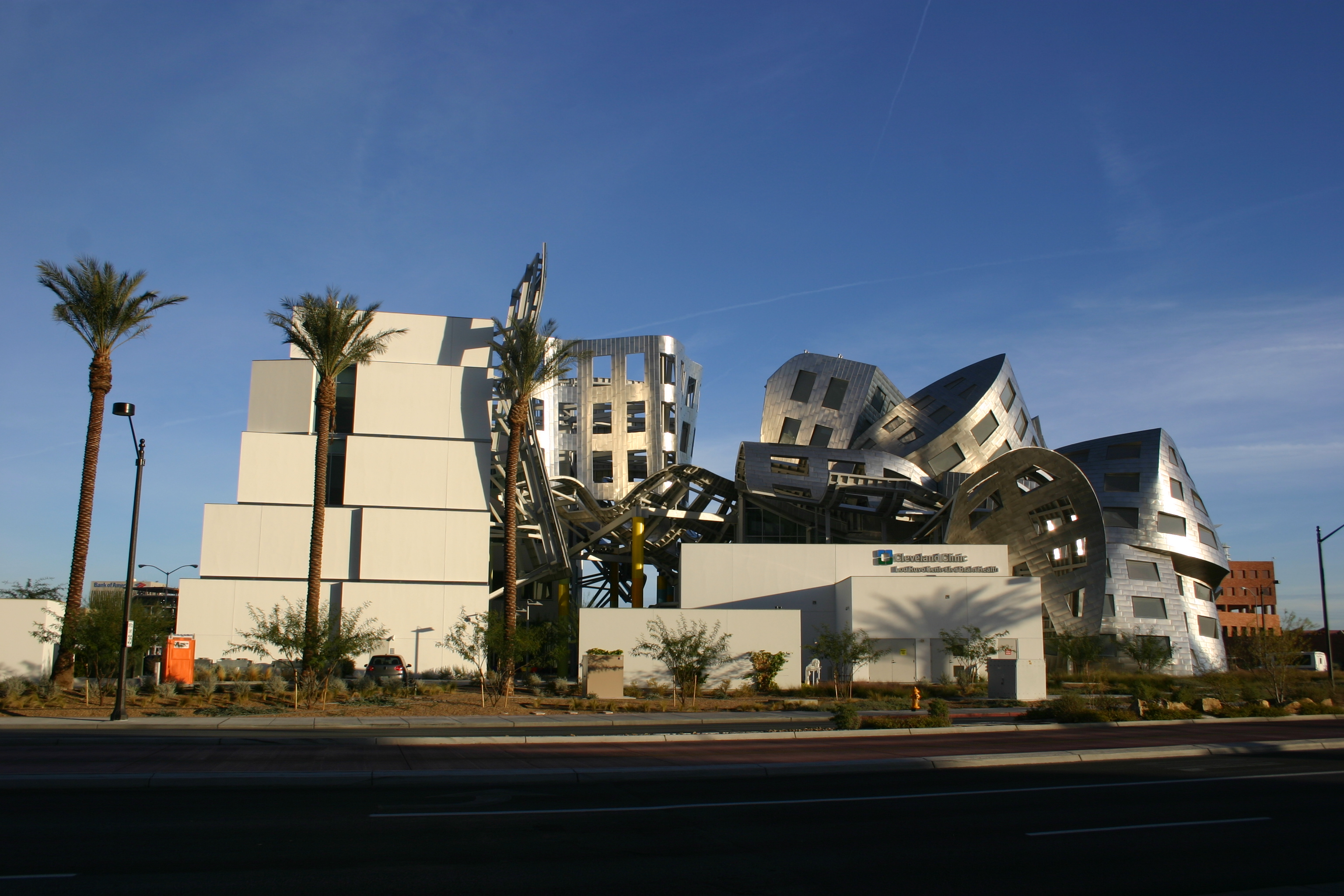
The west side of the building

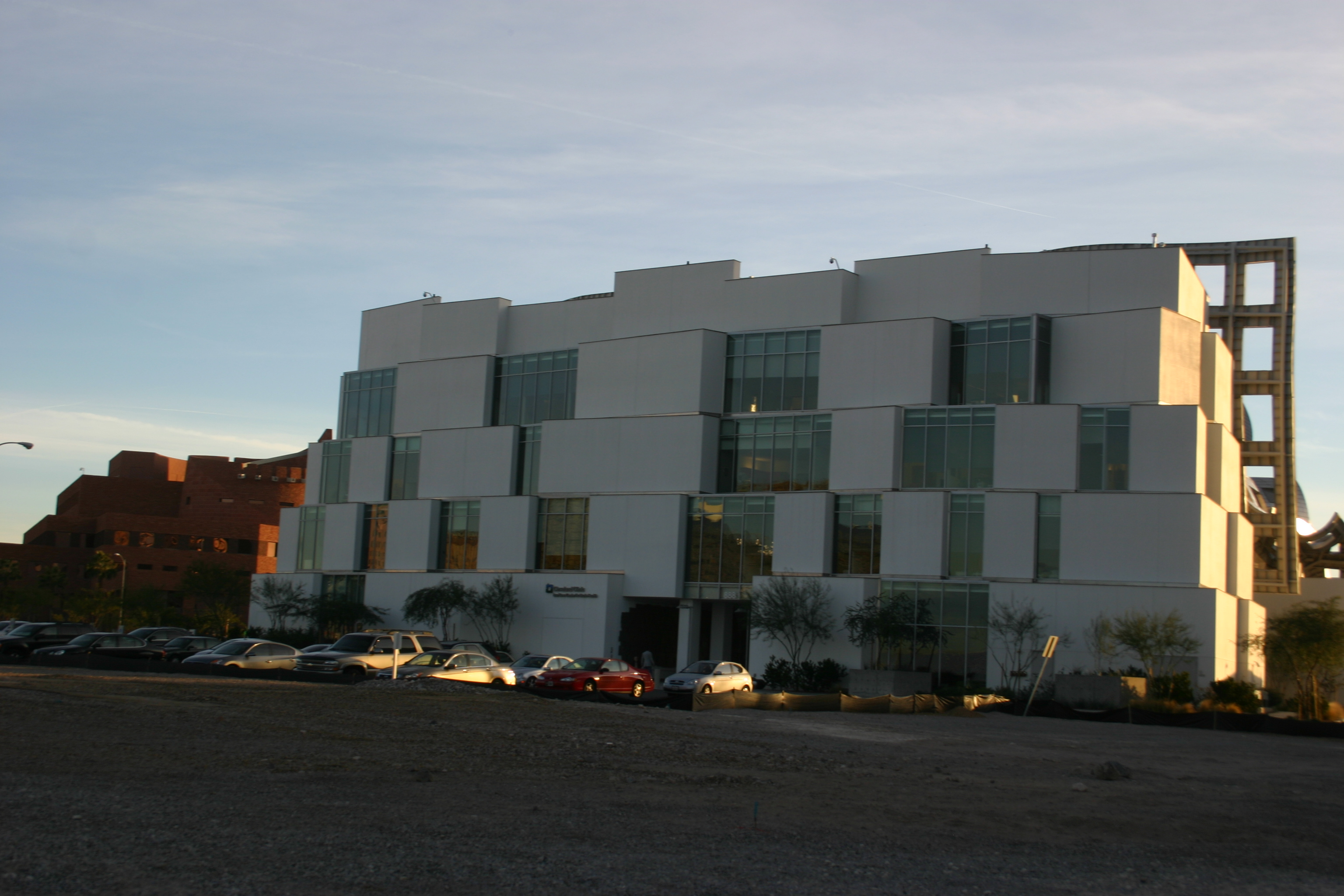
The north side of the building

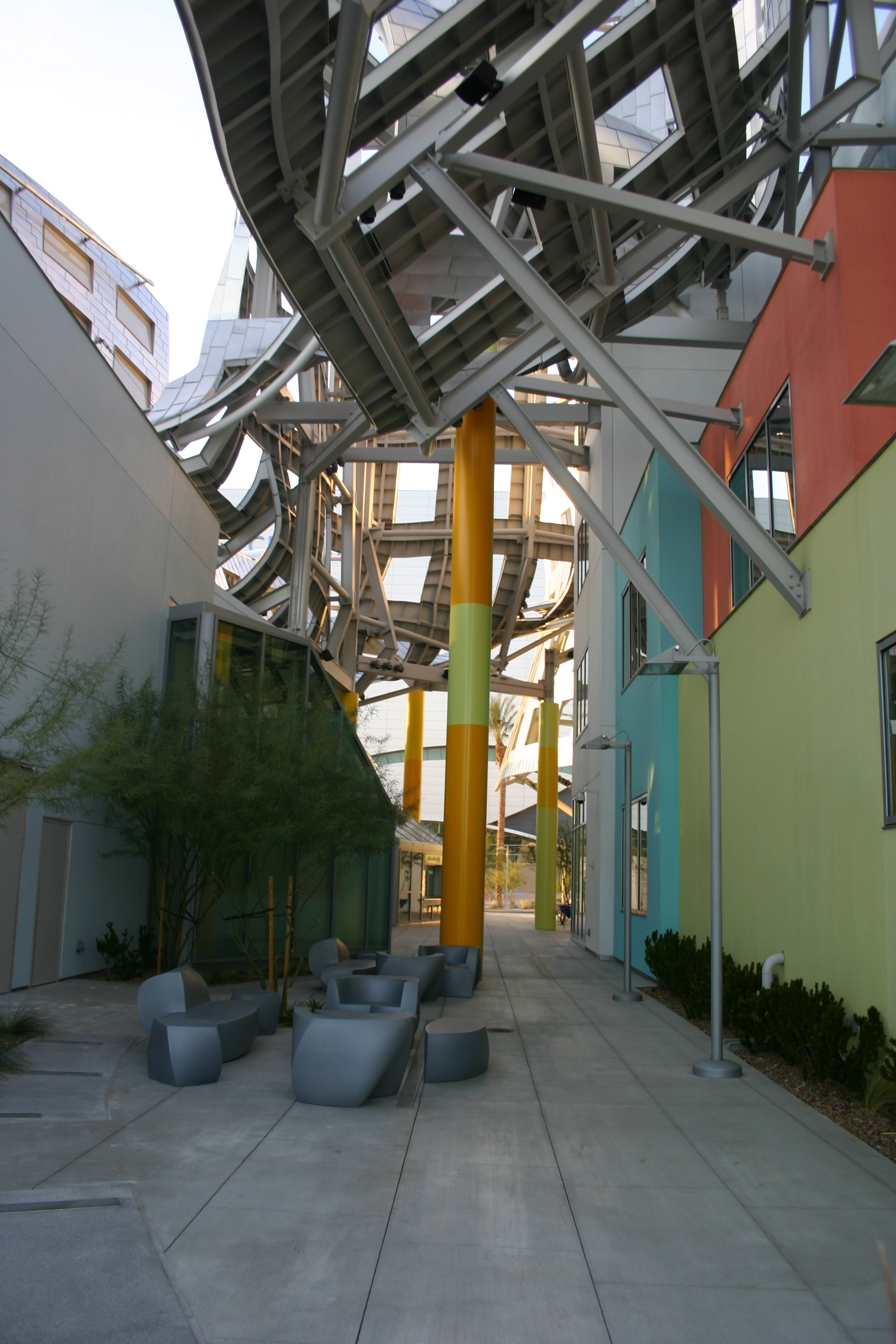
The atrium in the middle

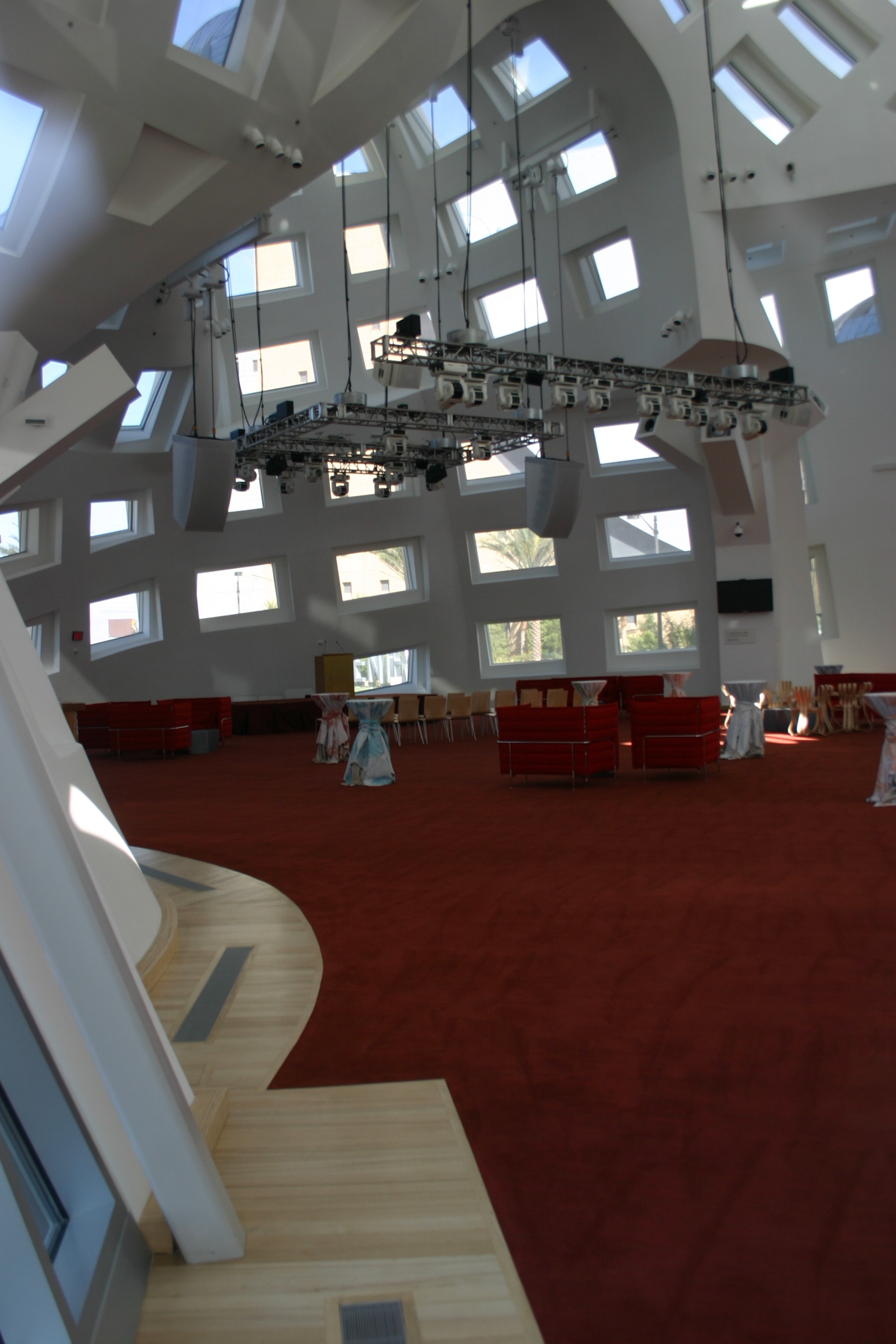
Inside the event space

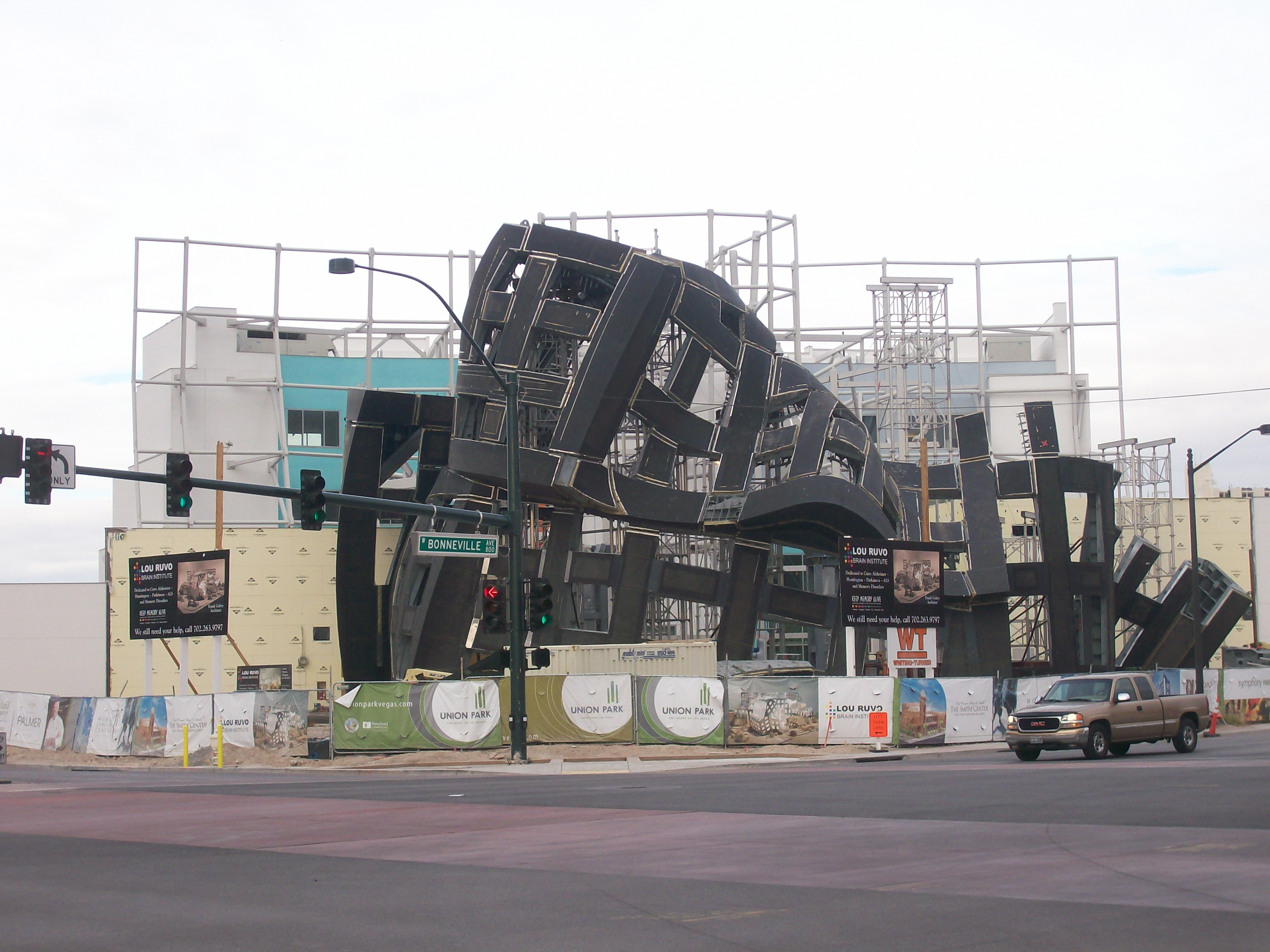
During construction in January 2009

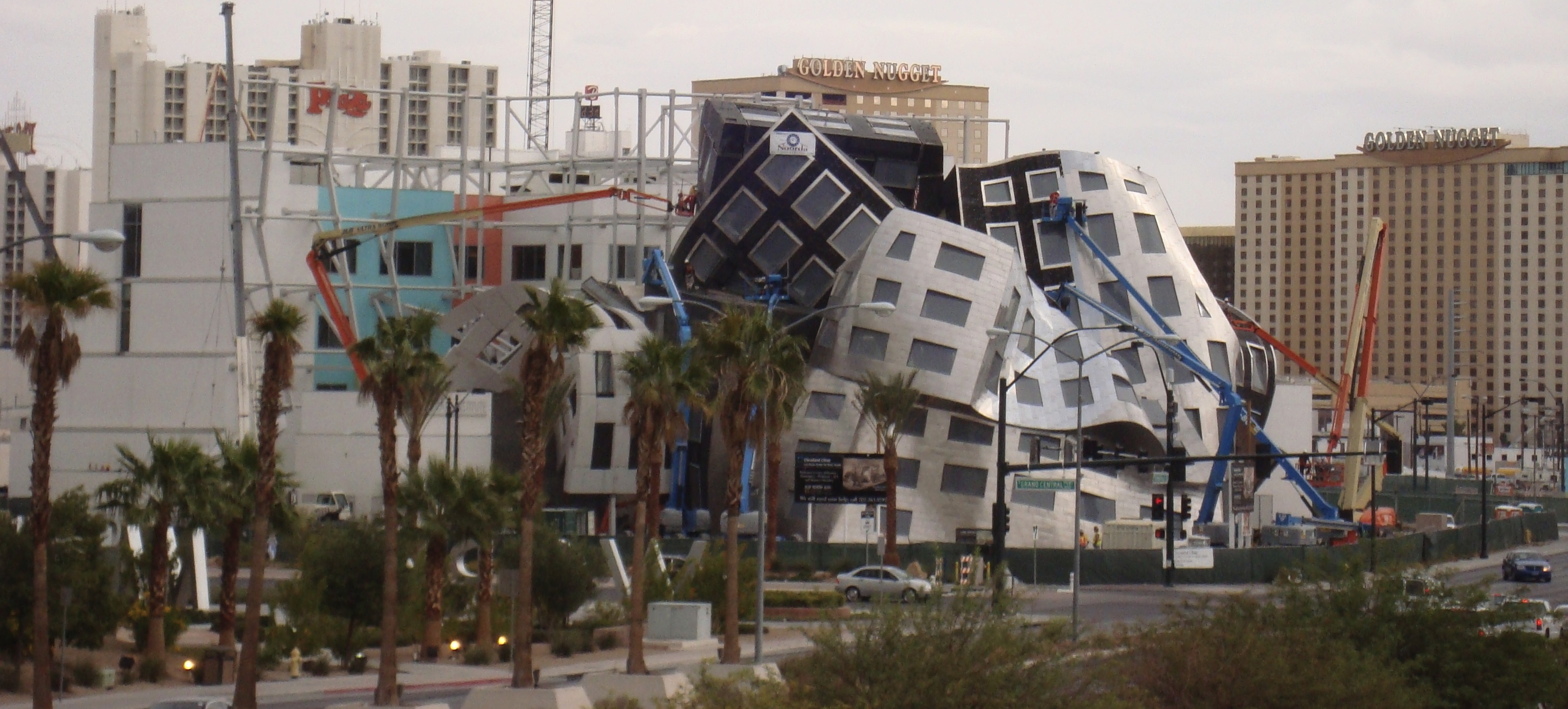
During construction in October 2009

== See also ==
- Ray and Maria Stata Center, Massachusetts
- List of works by Frank Gehry
