= Crooner =

Type of singer

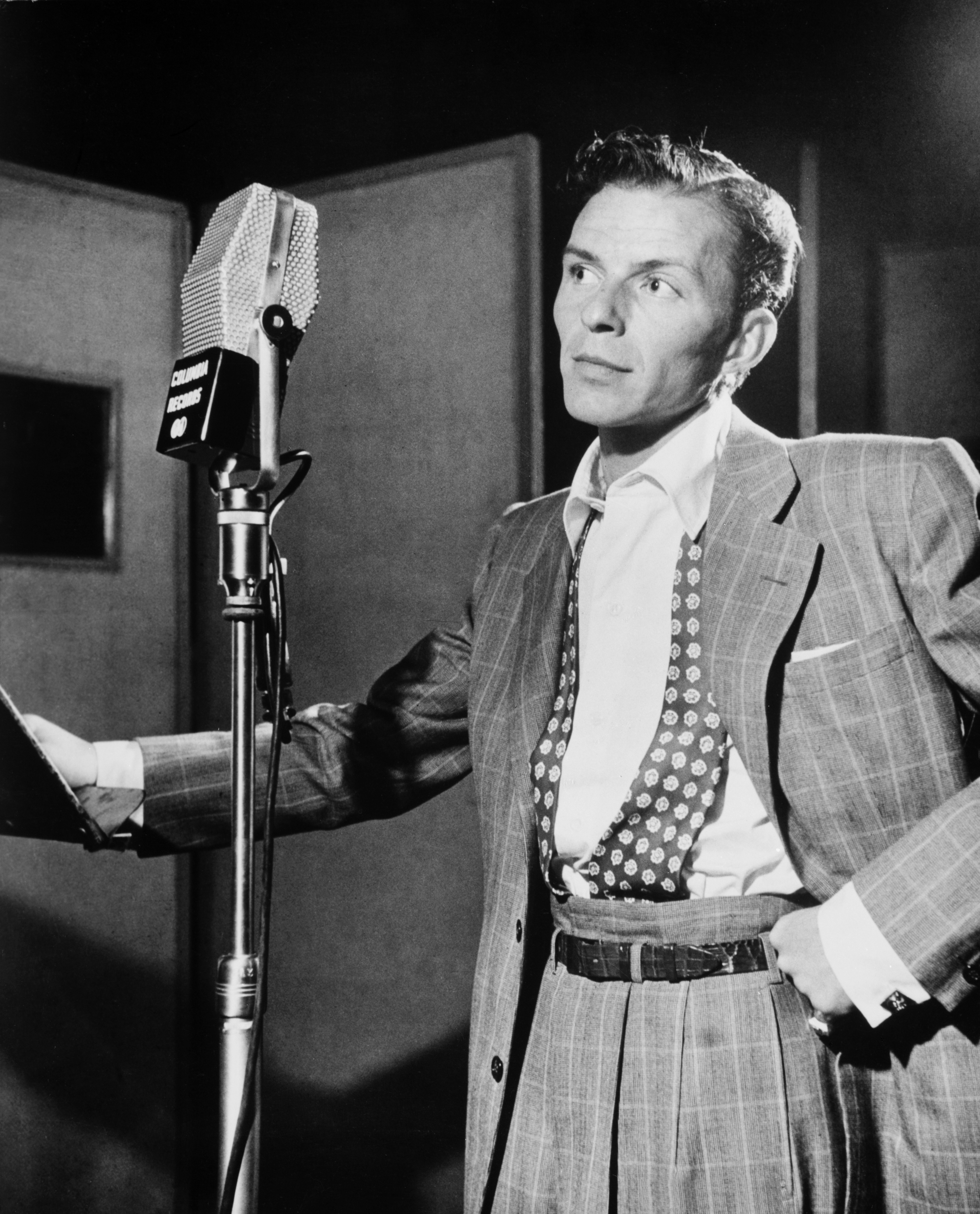
Frank Sinatra in 1947

A crooner is a singer who performs with a smooth, intimate style that originated in the 1920s. The crooning style was made possible by improved microphones that picked up quieter sounds and a wider range of frequencies than before, allowing the singer to access a greater dynamic range and exploit the proximity effect. This suggestion of intimacy was notably aimed at a female audience, especially a youth subculture known at the time as "bobby soxers". The crooning style developed among singers who performed with big bands and reached its height in the 1940s to late 1960s.

Crooning is epitomized by vocalists of the era such as Al Bowlly, Bing Crosby, Rudy Vallee and Frank Sinatra, although Sinatra did not consider himself or Crosby to be "crooners". Other performers, such as Russ Columbo, also rejected the term.

== History ==
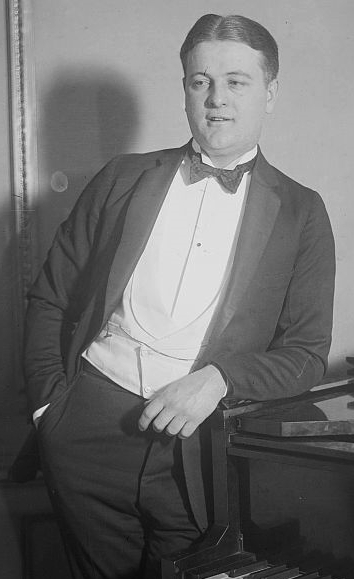
Gene Austin

"Learn to Croon"
Bing Crosby demonstrates how to croon in this 1933 recording

This dominant popular vocal style coincided with the advent of radio broadcasting and electrical recording. Before the advent of the microphone, singers had to project to the rear seats of a theater, which made for a very loud vocal style. The microphone made a more personal style possible. Al Bowlly, Bing Crosby, Gene Austin, Art Gillham, and by some accounts Vaughn De Leath are often credited as inventors of the crooning style, but Rudy Vallée brought the style widespread popularity.

In his popular radio program, which began with his floating greeting, "Heigh ho, everybody," beamed in from a New York City night club, he stood like a statue, surrounded by clean-cut collegiate band musicians and cradling a saxophone in his arms.

— Ian Whitcomb

His first film, The Vagabond Lover, was promoted with the line, "Men Hate Him! Women Love Him!" while his success brought press warnings of the "Vallee Peril": this "punk from Maine" with the "dripping voice" required mounted police to "beat back crowds of screaming and swooning females" at his vaudeville shows.

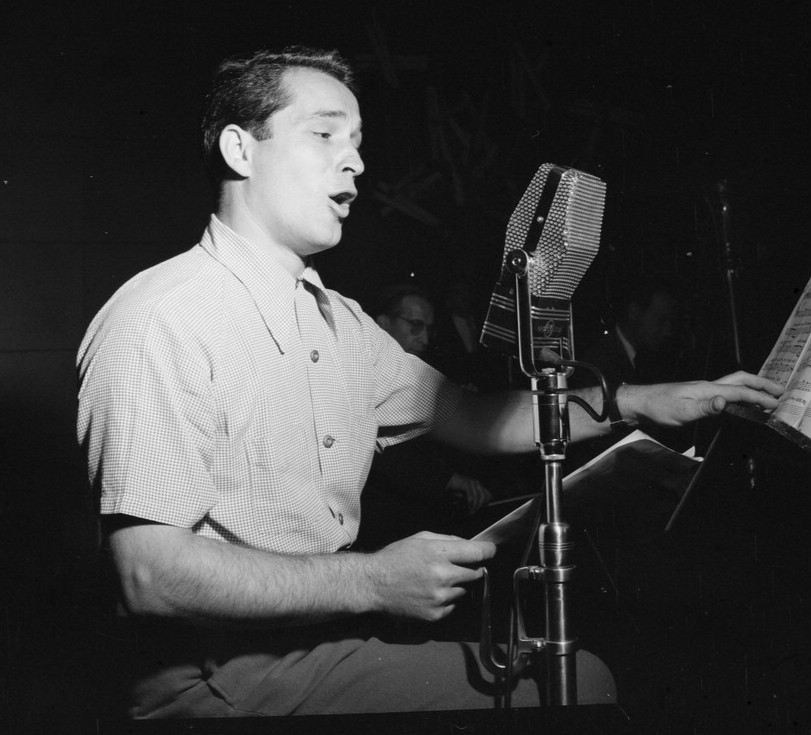
Perry Como, October 1946

By the early 1930s, the term "crooner" had taken on a pejorative connotation. Cardinal William O'Connell of Boston and the New York Singing Teachers Association (NYSTA) both publicly denounced the vocal form, O'Connell calling it "base", "degenerate", "defiling" and un-American, with the NYSTA adding "corrupt". Even The New York Times predicted that crooning would be just a passing fad. The newspaper wrote, "They sing like that because they can't help it. Their style is begging to go out of fashion…. Crooners will soon go the way of tandem bicycles, mah jongg and midget golf." Voice range shifted from tenor (Vallée) to baritone (Russ Columbo, Bing Crosby). Still, a 1931 record by Dick Robertson, "Crosby, Columbo, and Vallee", called upon men to fight "these public enemies" brought into homes via radio.

== Female crooners ==
The term crooner has been applied to some female singers around the world, especially those who have low alto voices. Among the first was white American singer Lee Morse who performed in three Vitaphone short films in 1930. A cartoon published in the Cleveland Plain Dealer in 1930 listed four male and seven female singers as the "All-American Crooning Eleven". Blues singer Ruth Etting was in the group, along with Helen Morgan, Libby Holman, Bernadene Hayes, Annette Hanshaw, and others. Several more American women singers were called crooners in 1950 with chart hits by Teresa Brewer and Patti Page. Anita O'Day's version of "Tennessee Waltz" was a crooner-style hit in 1951. The success of women crooners continued through 1956 but was diminished in 1957 after Billboard combined the segregated black and white pop charts, which led to a rise in male hit songs. Black American blues singer Nina Simone has been described as a crooner for her work in the 1960s and 1970s.

== Country crooners ==
Due to the country songs popularized by Bing Crosby, the crooning style of singing became an enduring part of country music. Crosby achieved a million seller with his 1940 rendition of the song "San Antonio Rose", originally recorded by Bob Wills & His Texas Playboys. In 1942, Perry Como had a smash hit with "Deep in the Heart of Texas"; Crosby, who had an enormous influence on Como, covered this song and took it to the number 3 position in the US chart that same year. Eddy Arnold, Jim Reeves and Ray Price are especially well known for their country crooner standards.

Dean Martin is associated with the country music he recorded in the period when he was working for Reprise Records, whilst his fellow Italian-American crooner Como recorded several albums with country producer Chet Atkins in Nashville. Regular, non-country crooners also scored hits with pop versions of country songs: Tony Bennett had a Billboard number 1 hit in 1951 with his rendition of Hank Williams' "Cold, Cold Heart"; Como had a number 1 hit in 1953 with his version of "Don't Let the Stars Get in Your Eyes", a chart-topping country hit for its author Slim Willet and a number 4 country hit for Ray Price; Guy Mitchell scored a number 1 in 1959 with "Heartaches by the Number", a country hit for Ray Price; and Britain's Engelbert Humperdinck achieved a 1967 UK number 1 hit with "Release Me", another song already made famous by Price in 1954. In 1970, Price had a number 1 US country hit and a number 11 Hot 100 hit with the song "For the Good Times", written by Kris Kristofferson; subsequently, Como's rendition reached number 7 in 1973 on the UK Singles Chart.

== Modern-day crooners of the Great American Songbook ==
- Harry Connick Jr. played a pivotal role in bringing the crooner style back into mainstream media during the late 1980s and 1990s, particularly with his work on the soundtrack for When Harry Met Sally (1989). His interpretations of jazz standards like "It Had to Be You" helped reintroduce crooning to a new generation of listeners. The album's success, earning double-platinum status and critical acclaim, was a key factor in reviving interest in the crooner style during that period.
- Michael Bublé emerged in the early 2000s as a key figure in continuing this revival for a new generation. Bublé brought a modern sensibility to his interpretations, blending traditional swing and jazz with pop influences, which resonated with both older and younger audiences.
- Seth MacFarlane has also made significant contributions to the contemporary crooner movement. Beginning in the early 2010s, MacFarlane released several albums that showcase his strong affinity for traditional pop standards and big band jazz. Albums like Music Is Better Than Words (2011) received critical acclaim further solidifying crooning in the modern era.
- Michael Feinstein stands as a prominent figure in the modern revival of the crooner tradition, known for his deep commitment to preserving and interpreting the Great American Songbook.
- Tommy Ward has emerged as a rising figure in the modern crooner scene, distinguished by his headlining career on the Las Vegas strip and a close mentorship with Quincy Jones, who has likened Ward to Frank Sinatra.
- Dennis van Aarssen, a Dutch singer who gained international attention after winning The Voice of Holland in 2019, has carved out a niche in the modern crooner scene with his smooth interpretations of jazz standards and pop classics.

== See also ==
- List of crooners
