= Larry Ruvo =

American business executive

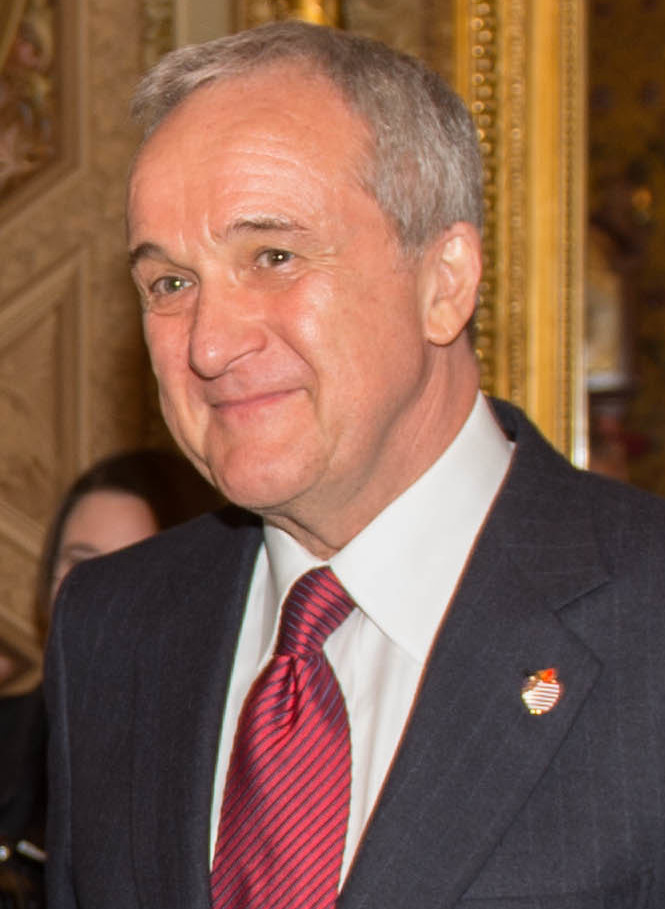
- Ruvo in 2014
- Born: 1946 (age 79–80)

Lawrence Wayne Ruvo (born 1946) is an American business executive, wine expert, and philanthropist who is currently the vice president and general manager of Southern Wine and Spirits of Nevada. He founded the Keep Memory Alive foundation and The Lou Ruvo Brain Institute. He serves on the American Gaming Association Board of Directors and is a member of the Gaming Hall of Fame (2005). He is married and has three daughters.

Larry Ruvo is one of the leaders in finding a cure for Alzheimer's Disease through the "Keep Memory Alive Foundation" & The Cleveland Clinic / Lou Ruvo Brain Institute.

== Biography ==
Born in 1946, Ruvo graduated from Las Vegas High School in 1964.

Ruvo spent the early part of his career managing the Los Angeles Playboy Club, working at The Venetian Restaurant, Sahara Hotel and Caesars Palace Hotel. In 1970 with partner Steve Wynn he formed a liquor distributorship. That operation grew into Southern Wine and Spirits of Nevada.

After the death of his father in 1994, Ruvo worked towards establishing a cognitive disease center, which resulted in his funding of The Lou Ruvo Brain Institute.
