= Norman (name) =

Norman is both a surname and a given name. The surname has multiple origins including English, Irish (in Ulster), Scottish, German, French, Norwegian, Ashkenazi Jewish, and Jewish American. The given name Norman is mostly of English origin, though in some cases it can be an Anglicised form of a Scottish Gaelic personal name.

== Etymology ==
=== Surname ===
There are several different origins of the surname Norman.

1. As a surname of English, Irish (in Ulster), Scottish and Dutch origin the name was used to denote someone of Scandinavian ancestry or someone from Normandy (northern France). During the Middle Ages Scandinavian Vikings called themselves norðmenn ("men from the North"), which remains the Norwegian term for "Norwegian". By 1066 Scandinavian settlers in England had been absorbed and Northman and Norman were used as bynames and later as personal names by both English and English of Scandinavian descent. After the Norman Invasion of England in 1066, the name Norman took on a new meaning as England was invaded by Normans from Normandy (in northern France). The Normans were themselves descendants of Scandinavians who had established a state in Normandy; thus the term has the same meaning whether it refers to descendants of first wave Scandinavian settlers of the British isles or Normans from Normandy.
2. As a surname of French origin the name is a regional name denoting someone from Normandy.
3. As a surname of Dutch origin the surname is an ethnic name for someone of Norwegian descent.
4. As a surname of Jewish (Ashkenazic) origin the surname is a variant of Nordman.
5. As a surname of Jewish (American) origin the surname is an Americanization of a similar-sounding Ashkenazic name. In at least one case Norman is used as an Americanization of Novominsky, which is a name of a family originating in Uman, Ukraine. This family on coming to the United States of America changed their name to Norman, and relatives in Russia likewise changed their names from Novominsky to Norman.
6. As a surname of Swedish origin the name is derived the two elements: norr (north) + man ("man").

=== Given name ===
Norman as a given name is of mostly English origin. It is a Germanic name and is composed of the elements nord ("north") + man ("man"). The name can be found in England before the Norman Invasion of 1066, but gained popularity by its use by Norman settlers in England after the invasion. In Norway, the demonym of its people in Norwegian are Nordmann (pronounce Normann), and has the exactly same meaning as the name origin of the Normans. In the Scottish Highlands, Norman is sometimes used as an Anglicised form of the Norwegian and Scottish Gaelic Tormod (derived from the Norse Þórmóðr). A pet form of the Scottish given name is Norrie. There are several Scottish feminine forms of the given name Norman. These include: Normanna, Normina, Norma, Nora, and Mona.

In England, the use of Norman as a given name is dying out. For example, in 2005 only two newborn boys were given the name; one in Shropshire and another in Tyne and Wear.

== Distribution ==
=== England, Wales and the Isle of Man ===
Norman is ranked as the 273rd most common surname in the 1999–2001 National Health Service Central Register of England, Wales and the Isle of Man (the register utilises birth and death registers from 1999 to 2001).

=== Ireland ===
The surname Norman is of English origin, having arrived in the province of Ulster in the 17th century during the plantation era (See Plantation of Ulster and Plantations of Ireland). The surname is most common in Dublin, Belfast and Cork. Below is a table of Norman households recorded in the Primary Valuation (Griffith's valuation) property survey of 1848–64.

# of Norman households per county, 1848–64
County	#	County	#
Armagh	1	Cork (county)	10
Cork (city)	1	Donegal	7
Dublin	7	Dublin (city)	9
Kerry	2	Kildare	6
Laois	2	Limerick	5
Limerick (city)	2	Louth	3
Roscommon	1	Sligo	1
Tipperary	2	Westmeath	3

=== United States ===
- Surname: In the 1990 Census Norman is ranked as the 396th most frequent surname. By the 2000 Census the surname was ranked at 461st most frequent surname. The table below shows the statistics for the surname Norman in the 2000 Census See footnote for description of the header.

name	rank	count	prop100k	cum_prop100k	pctwhite	pctblack	pctapi	pctaian	pct2prace	pcthispanic
NORMAN	461	65269	24.2	31690.75	71.58	24.13	0.42	0.61	1.71	1.54

- Given name: Norman is ranked as the 113th most frequent male given name in the 1990 Census.

== People ==
=== Surname ===
- Abby Norman (beauty pageant titleholder), Miss Wyoming USA
- Abby Norman (writer), American science writer
- Al Norman, the founder of Sprawl-Busters, a noted anti-sprawl activism organization
- Albert Norman (1882–1964), British co-founder of the Institute of Biomedical Science
- Alfred Merle Norman (1831–1918), British clergyman, naturalist and marine zoologist
- Andrew Norman (born 1980), English professional snooker player
- Andrew Norman (born 1979), American composer of contemporary classical music
- Andrew Norman (rugby league) (born 1972), Papua New Guinean rugby league player
- Aneurin Norman (born 1991), Welsh cricketer
- Anna-Kajsa Norman (1820–1903), known as Spel-Stina, Swedish folk musician, spelman and a composer
- Anthony W. Norman (1938–2019), professor of biochemistry and biomedical sciences
- Archie Norman (born 1954), British businessman and politician
- Sir Arthur Norman (1917–2011), British industrialist
- Arthur Charles Alfred Norman (1858–1944), British architect
- Arthur Norman (computer scientist), British computer scientist
- Arthur St. Norman (1878–1956), South African long-distance runner
- Barak Norman (c. 1670 – c. 1740), English string instrument maker
- Barry Norman (1933–2017), British film critic
- Bebo Norman (born 1973), contemporary Christian musician
- Birger Norman (1914–1995), Swedish journalist, poet, novelist, playwright and non-fiction writer
- Bob Norman (born 1969), South Florida journalist
- Charles Norman CBE (1891–1974), General Officer Commanding Aldershot District
- Charles Norman (cricketer) (1833–1889), English banker and cricketer
- Charlie Norman (1920–2005), Swedish musician and entertainer
- Chris Norman (born 1950), British musician
- Chris Norman (American football) (born 1962), former punter in National Football League
- Chris Norman (flautist) (born in Halifax, Nova Scotia) (born 1963), flautist
- Connie Norman (1949–1996), American AIDS and trans rights activist
- Conolly Norman (1853–1908), Irish alienist or psychiatrist
- Corey Norman (born 1991), Australian aboriginal rugby league player
- Craig Norman, native of Greenfield Park, Quebec
- Dan Norman (born 1952), former right fielder in Major League Baseball
- Daniel Norman (born 1964), Canadian slalom canoer
- David Norman (disambiguation)
- Decima Norman, MBE (1909–1983), Australian athlete
- Denis Norman (1931–2019), English-born Zimbabwean former politician
- Dennis Norman (born 1980), American football guard
- Desmond Norman (1929–2002), British aircraft designer
- Diana Norman (1933–2011), British author and journalist
- Dianne Norman (born 1971), Canadian former basketball player
- Dinah Margaret Norman (born 1946), British chess master
- Dick Norman (born 1971), Belgian tennis player
- Dick Norman (American football) (born 1938), former American football quarterback
- Donald Norman (born 1935), professor and usability consultant
- Dorothy Norman (1905–1997), American photographer, writer, editor, arts patron, advocate for social change
- E. Herbert Norman (1909–1957), Canadian diplomat and historian
- Edward Norman (born 1938), Canon Chancellor of York Minster, ecclesiastical historian
- Edward Norman (bishop), KBE, DSO, MC (1916–1987), New Zealand Anglican bishop
- Eldred Norman (1914–1971), Australian inventor and racing-car driver
- Emile Norman (1918–2009), iconoclastic California artist
- Ernest Norman (1904–1971), American electrical engineer, co-founder of the Unarius Academy of Science
- Ernie Norman (1913–1993), Australian rugby league player
- Florence Norman, CBE (1881–1964), English socialite and activist
- Floyd Norman (born 1935), American animator on Walt Disney films in the late '50s and early '60s
- Frank Norman (1930–1980), British novelist and playwright
- Fred Norman (born 1942), American baseball player
- Fred B. Norman (1882–1947), U.S. Representative from Washington
- Frederick Norman (1839–1916), English merchant banker, director of merchant bank Brown, Shipley & Co
- Georg Norman (died 1552 or 1553), civil servant of German origin, in Swedish service from 1539
- George Norman (disambiguation)
- Gilbert Norman (1915–1944) in Saint-Cloud, Hauts-de-Seine
- Greg Norman (born 1955), Australian professional golfer
- Gurney Norman (1937–2025), American writer, documentarian, and professor
- H. Wayne Norman Jr. (1955–2018), American lawyer and politician
- Hayley Marie Norman (born 1989), American actress and model
- Henry Wylie Norman GCB, GCMG, CIE (1826–1904), Field Marshal, colonial Governor of Jamaica and Queensland
- Howard Norman (born 1949), American writer
- Ian Norman, Professor of Nursing and Inter-Disciplinary Care at King's College London
- Jace Norman (born 2000), American actor
- James Norman (disambiguation)
- Jane Norman, United Kingdom-based women's clothing retailer
- Jared Norman (born 1974), former English cricketer
- Jennie Van Norman (1870–1946), birth name of stage actress Jane Peyton
- Jerry Norman (sinologist) (1936–2012), American sinologist and linguist
- Jerry Norman (basketball) (born 1929/1930), American basketball coach
- Jesse Norman (born 1962), British Conservative politician
- Jessye Norman (1945–2019), American opera singer and recitalist
- Jim Norman (disambiguation)
- Jimmy Norman (1937–2011), American rhythm and blues and jazz musician and a songwriter
- Joe Norman (born 1956), former professional American football linebacker
- John Norman (disambiguation)
- Josh Norman (cornerback) (born 1987), American football cornerback
- K. R. Norman (1925–2020), leading scholar of Middle Indo-Aryan or Prakrit, particularly of Pali
- Karl Norman (born 1983), Australian rules football player
- Keith Norman, general secretary of the Associated Society of Locomotive Engineers and Firemen (ASLEF)
- Kelvin Norman (1955–2005), deceased American soccer defender
- Ken Norman (born 1964), American former professional basketball player
- Kent Norman, American cognitive psychologist, expert on Computer Rage
- Larry Norman (1947–2008), Christian rock music pioneer
- Larry Norman (canoeist) (born 1966), canoer
- Lavinia Norman (1882–1983), one of the founders of Alpha Kappa Alpha sorority
- Leonard Norman (1947–2021), Jersey politician and Connétable of Saint Clement
- Leslie Norman (disambiguation)
- Lindsay D. Norman (born 1938), American mining engineer and educator
- Linly Norman (c. 1836–1869), English pianist and conductor in Australia
- Lisa Norman (born 1979), shinty player and manager from Kincardine, Fife, Scotland
- Lisanne Norman (born 1951), Scottish science fiction author
- Loulie Jean Norman (1913–2005), coloratura soprano
- Lucille Norman (1921–1998), American singer and film actress
- Ludvig Norman (1831–1885), Swedish composer, conductor, pianist, and music teacher
- Magnus Norman (born 1976), Swedish professional tennis player
- Maidie Norman (1912–1998), American stage, film and television actress
- Marc Norman (born 1941), American screenwriter
- Marciano Norman (born 1954), head of the Indonesian State Intelligence Agency
- Marrio Norman (born 1986), American football player
- Mark Norman (disambiguation)
- Marsha Norman (born 1947), American playwright and Pulitzer Prize winner
- Matt Norman (Canadian football) (born 1988), Canadian football offensive lineman
- Matthew Norman (born 1986), Australian drug trafficker, member of the Bali Nine
- Maurice Norman (1934–2022), English former footballer
- Max Magnus Norman (born 1973), Swedish contemporary artist
- Max Norman, record producer and recording engineer
- Michael Norman (disambiguation)
- Moe Norman (1929–2004), Canadian professional golfer
- Montagu Norman, 1st Baron Norman (1871–1950), English banker
- Monty Norman (1928–2022), British singer and film composer
- Moriah van Norman (born 1984), American water polo player
- Nancy Norman (1925–2024), American vocalist
- Nathan Norman (sealing captain) (1809–1883), sealing captain, political figure in Newfoundland
- Neil Norman, British playwright and critic
- Nelson Norman (born 1958), former Major League Baseball shortstop
- Nigel Norman (1897–1943), Baronet, RAF officer and businessman
- Nils Norman (born 1966), artist living in London
- Norman B. Norman (1914–1991), American advertising executive who co-founded the Norman, Craig & Kummel advertising agency
- Oliver Norman (1911–1983), English cricketer
- Patrick Norman (singer) (born 1946), Canadian country singer from Quebec
- Patrick Norman (musician), American guitarist for Rusted Root
- Paul Norman (disambiguation)
- Peg Norman (born 1964), Canadian documentary filmmaker
- Peter Norman (1942–2006), Australian track athlete and Olympic medallist
- Peter Norman (politician) (born 1958), Swedish economist and politician
- Pettis Norman (1939–2025), American football tight end
- Philip Norman (artist) FSA (1842–1931), British artist, author and antiquary
- Philip Norman (author) (born 1943), English novelist, biographer, journalist and playwright
- Rae Norman (1958–2020), American actress
- Ralph Norman (born 1953), American real estate developer
- Ray Norman (1889–1971), Australian rugby league footballer and coach
- Remington Norman (born 1944), wine expert and author
- Rex Norman (1891–1961), Australian rugby league footballer
- Richard Norman, British philosopher
- Richard Norman (chemist) (1932–1993), British chemist
- Richie Norman (born 1935), former English footballer
- Rick Norman (born 1963), former Australian rules footballer
- Robert Norman, 16th-century British mariner, compass builder, and hydrographer
- Roger Norman (disambiguation)
- Roger the Norman or Roger II of Sicily (1095–1154), King of Sicily
- Rolla Norman (1889–1971), French actor
- Ronald Collet Norman JP (1873–1963), banker, administrator and politician
- Ross Norman (born 1959), former professional squash player from New Zealand
- Russel Norman (born 1967), New Zealand politician and environmentalist
- Ruth Norman (1900–1993), also known as Uriel, American religious leader
- Samuel Hinga Norman (1940–2007), Sierra Leonean politician from the Mende tribe
- Seth Walker Norman (1934–2023), US judge, former Democrat regional politician, former airman
- Stephen Norman (1918–1946), the grandson of the founder of Zionism, Theodor Herzl
- Steve Norman (born 1960), English musician who plays saxophone, guitar, percussion for Spandau Ballet
- Terry Norman (born 1949), Kent State University student allegedly involved in the Kent State shootings
- Tom Norman (1860–1930), English businessman and showman
- Tom Van Norman (born 1964), Democratic member of the South Dakota House of Representatives
- Tony Norman (born 1958), former professional footballer
- Torquil Norman CBE (1933–2025), British businessman, aircraft enthusiast, and arts philanthropist
- Victor D. Norman (1946–2024), Norwegian economist, politician and newspaper columnist
- Warren Norman (born 1990), American football player
- Will Norman (1903–1964), professional football player
- William Norman (VC) VC (1832–1896), English recipient of the Victoria Cross
- William the Norman (died 1075), medieval Bishop of London
- Woody Norman (born 2009), English child actor

=== Given name ===
- Norm Abram (born 1949), American carpenter, cabinet maker and television personality
- Norman Abramson (1932–2020), American engineer and computer scientist
- Norman Allinger (1928–2020), American chemist and Nobel laureate
- Norman Armitage (Norman Cohn; 1907–1972), American Olympic bronze medal-winning saber fencer
- Norman Arterburn (1902–1979), Justice of the Indiana Supreme Court
- Norman Baker (born 1957), British Liberal Democrat politician and former Home Office minister
- Norman Banks (broadcaster) (1905–1985), Australian radio broadcaster
- Norman Barrett (1903–1979), Australian-born British thoracic surgeon
- Norman Bates, fictional character at the center of the Psycho franchise
- Norman Bates (musician) (1927–2004), American jazz double-bass player
- Norman Bethune (1890–1939), Canadian physician and medical innovator
- Norman Borlaug (1914–2009), American agricultural scientist, humanitarian and Nobel Laureate
- Norman L. Bowen (1887–1956), Canadian geologist
- Norman Bridwell (1928–2014), American author and cartoonist best known for the Clifford the Big Red Dog book series
- Norman Buttigieg (born 1956), Maltese footballer
- Norman Carlberg (1928–2018), American sculptor
- Norman Keith "Sailor Jerry" Collins (1911–1973), American tattoo artist
- Norman Spencer Chaplin (1919–1919), first son of Charlie Chaplin
- Norman Cocker (1889–1953), English organist
- Norman Cook (born 1963), British DJ and electronic dance music musician (born Quentin Cook, aka Fatboy Slim)
- Norman Cousins (1915–1990), American journalist and political activist
- Norman Cornish (1919–2014), English mining artist
- Norman Crow, American politician
- Norman Davies (born 1939), leading English historian
- Norman Demuth (1898–1968), English composer
- Norman Edge (1934–2018), American jazz musician
- Norman Julius "Boomer" Esiason (born 1961), former NFL football player
- Norman Fell (1924–1998), American actor of film and television
- Norman Finkelstein (born 1953), American political scientist and author
- Norman Fowler, Baron Fowler (born 1938), English Conservative politician
- Norman Francis (1931–2026), American academic
- Norman Fraser (1904–1986), English composer and pianist
- Norman Fulton (1909–1980), English composer, broadcaster and teacher
- Norman Gibbs (Canadian football) (born 1960), American football player
- Normie Glick (1927–1989), basketball player
- Norman Gordon (1911–2014), South African cricketer
- Norman J. Grossfeld (born 1963), American television producer and writer
- Norman Hallam (1920–1997), English footballer
- Norman Hallam (born 1946), English clarinetist and composer
- Norman Hetherington, (1921–2010), Australian cartoonist and puppeteer
- Norman Himes (1900–1958), Canadian National Hockey League player
- Norman Ives (1923–1978) American artist, graphic designer, educator, and fine art publisher
- Norman Jewison (1926–2024), Canadian filmmaker
- Norman Jones (disambiguation), several persons
- Norman Kerry (1894–1956), American actor
- Norman Kwong (1929–2016), Canadian Football League player, businessman and politician
- Norman Lamb (born 1957), British Liberal Democrat politician
- Norman Lamont (born 1942), British Conservative politician and former Chancellor of the Exchequer
- Norman Lear (1922–2023), American television producer and screenwriter
- Norman Lebrecht (born 1948), British commentator on music and cultural affairs, and novelist
- Norman Lewis (fencer) (1915–2006), American Olympic fencer
- Norman Lloyd (1914–2021), American actor
- Norman Lindsay (1879–1969), Australian artist, sculptor, writer, editorial cartoonist, scale modeler, and amateur boxer
- Norman Love, American pastry chef
- Norm Macdonald (1959–2021), Canadian stand-up comedian, writer, producer and actor
- Norman MacMillan, several people
- Norman Mailer (1923–2007), American writer
- Norman Malcolm (1911–1990), American philosopher and biographer of Ludwig Wittgenstein
- Norman McBride (born 1947), American football player
- Norman Mineta (1931–2022), American Secretary of Transportation and congressman
- Norman Müller (born 1985), German decathlete
- Norman Newell (1919–2004), English record producer and lyricist
- Norman Nixon (born 1955), American NBA basketball player
- Norman B. Norman (1914–1991), American advertising executive who co-founded the Norman, Craig & Kummel advertising agency
- Norman Ornstein (born 1948), American public scholar with expertise in the American federal legislature
- Norman O'Neill (1875–1934), English composer and conductor
- Norman Painting (1924–2009), British radio actor
- Norman Vincent Peale (1898–1993), American Protestant clergyman and author
- Norman Peterkin (1886–1982), English composer and music publisher
- Norman Podhoretz (1930–2025), American magazine editor, writer, and conservative political commentator
- Norman Powell (born 1993), American basketball player
- Norman Rees (1939–2023), Welsh television journalist
- Norman Reedus (born 1969), American actor and former model
- Norman Rockwell (1894–1978), American painter
- Norman Routledge (1928–2013), English mathematician and schoolteacher
- Norman Rothman, American gangster
- Normie Rowe (born 1947), Australian pop singer
- Normie Roy (1928–2011), American Major League Baseball pitcher
- Norman Sartorius (born 1935), Croatian psychiatrist
- Norman Schuster (born 1979), German boxer
- Norman Schwarzkopf, Jr. (1934–2012), United States Army general, leader of coalition forces in 1991 Gulf War
- Norm Sherry (1931–2021), American Major League Baseball player and manager
- Normie Smith (1908–1988), Canadian National Hockey League goaltender
- Norman Smith (record producer) (1923–2008), British pop musician, recording engineer and producer, also known as Hurricane Smith
- Norman Stone (1941–2019), Scottish historian and adviser to Margaret Thatcher
- Norman Suckling (1904–1994), English composer and writer on music
- Norman Tate (born 1942), American long and triple jumper
- Norman Taylor (rower) (1899–1980), Canadian rower
- Norman Taylor (basketball) (1965–2020), American basketball player
- Norman Tebbit (1931–2025), British Conservative politician
- Norman Toynton (1939–2025), British abstract painter
- Norman Ture, American researcher
- Norman D. Vaughan (1905–2005), American dogsled driver and explorer
- Norman Vaughan (comedian) (1923–2002), English comedian
- Norman Wisdom (1915–2010), English comedian, singer and actor
- Norman Wood (disambiguation)
- Norman Yokely (1906–1975), American baseball player

== Fictional characters ==
- Norman (Pokémon), in the Pokémon universe
- Norman (The Promised Neverland), a supporting protagonist in the manga series The Promised Neverland
- Norman Arminger, the primary villain of the early Emberverse series by S. M. Stirling
- Norman Bates, created by writer Robert Bloch and portrayed in the film Psycho by Anthony Perkins
- Norman Clegg, in the British sitcom Last of the Summer Wine
- Norman Stanley Fletcher, protagonist of the British TV prison comedy Porridge, portrayed by Ronnie Barker
- Norman Jayden, in the video game Heavy Rain
- Rod Norman, from the BBC soap opera EastEnders
- Norman Osborn, the arch-enemy of Spider-Man
- Norm Peterson, regular on the television show Cheers and guest character on several others, portrayed by George Wendt
- Norman Stansfield, the main antagonist in the movie Léon: The Professional
- Norman Wilson (The Wire), on the drama TV show The Wire

== See also ==
- Nordmann, demonym of the people of Norway
- Normand, also a given name and surname
- Van Norman Machine Tool Company, American manufacturer of milling machines and other machine tools
