= Ellen Glasgow House =

Historic house in Virginia, United States

- U.S. National Register of Historic Places
- U.S. National Historic Landmark
- Virginia Landmarks Register
- Richmond City Historic District
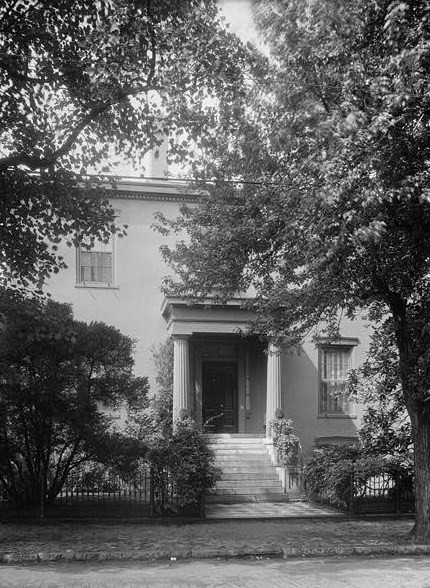
- HABS photo, 1936

- Location within Virginia Location within the United States
- Location: 1 W. Main St., Richmond, Virginia
- Coordinates: 37°32′34″N 77°26′42″W
- Built: 1841
- Architectural style: Greek Revival
- NRHP reference No.: 71001041
- VLR No.: 127-0056

Significant dates
- Added to NRHP: May 5, 1972
- Designated NHL: November 11, 1971
- Designated VLR: January 18, 1972

The Ellen Glasgow House, also known as the Branch-Glasgow House, is a historic house at 1 West Main Street in Richmond, Virginia. Built in 1841, it is nationally significant as the home of writer Ellen Glasgow (1873–1945) from 1887 until her death. It was declared a National Historic Landmark in 1971.

== Description and history ==
The Ellen Glasgow House is located in Richmond's Monroe Ward neighborhood, at the southwest corner of Foushee Street. It is a three-story stuccoed brick structure, with a hip roof. A narrow ell extends to the rear, and a porch extends across the rest of the rear. The main entrance is centered on the northern facade, sheltered by a porch supported by Greek Revival Doric columns. The interior is laid out with public rooms on the ground floor, with kitchen and servants' quarters in the ell, and two bedrooms upstairs. One was used by Ellen Glasgow has her bedroom, and the other as her office, where she did much of her writing.

The house was built in 1841 by David Branch, and was acquired by the parents of Ellen Glasgow when she was a teenager. She made this her home for the remainder of her life, during which time she wrote a series of novels, all set in her native Virginia. The combined opus provides a window into the social life of the region from about 1850 well into the 20th century. Glasgow was recognized in 1942 with the Pulitzer Prize for the Novel for her 1941 In This Our Life.

After Glasgow's death in 1945, the house was purchased by the Association for the Preservation of Virginia Antiquities (now Preservation Virginia). The organization has since sold the property.

In 1979, some of the rooms of the Ellen Glasgow House served as office space for Richmond Public Schools. On the property beyond the backyard garden was The Carriage House Gallery, part of the Ellen Glasgow House which featured exhibitions by local Richmond artists, including pinhole photographer Willie Anne Wright.

== See also ==
- List of National Historic Landmarks in Virginia
- National Register of Historic Places listings in Richmond, Virginia
