= George Norman =

George Norman may refer to:

- George Warde Norman (1793–1882), English director of the Bank of England, writer on finance, and Kent cricketer
- George Norman (cricketer, born 1890) (1890–1964), English cricketer
- George Norman (naturalist) (1823–1882), from Hull
- George Norman (pentathlete) (1927–2012), British Olympic modern pentathlete
- George Wesley Norman (1883–1970), printer and political figure in Saskatchewan
- George William Norman (1827–1918), American lawyer and politician
