= William Hendry =

William Hendry may refer to:

- William Hendry (naturalist) see George Norman (naturalist)
- Billy Hendry (William Harold Hendry, 1869-1901), Scottish footballer
- William Hendry (rugby league), Australian Rugby League player, see Glebe Dirty Reds
- Will Hendry (William Michael Hendry, born 1986), English footballer

== See also ==
- Bill Hendrie (William Tulloch Hendrie, 1884-1939), Australian rules footballer
