= Endomosaic =

Endomosaic is an artistic technique developed and named by the sculptor Emile Norman which features crushed glass and other materials suspended between sheets of acrylic. It was developed during the 1950s and used for the four-story window in the lobby of the California Masonic Memorial Temple on San Francisco's Nob Hill, which has become the artist's largest and best-known work.

The technique was developed as a natural progression of Norman's interest in the use of both natural and man-made materials. On a trip to Europe in the 1940s, Norman learnt about the "German Mastic" technique and first encountered epoxy. The endomosaic technique was later developed and used while designing the window displays for the Bergdorf Goodman Building in New York City. After Norman's move back to California, the technique was used to create a mural at Casa Munras Hospital in Monterey, California. It was this mural which attracted the attention of the Masonic Temple's architect Albert Roller. Roller invited Norman to design the large window which would be placed over the entrance to the building.

The endomosaic technique incorporates naturally coloured materials like seashells and stones mixed in with coloured glass and acrylic as well as fabric, grass, earth, and glass powder. The materials are sandwiched between thin panes of clear plastic or glass which are then soldered together and hung in a window frame. Since its use in the 1950s, the technique has gone out of fashion with Norman himself moving on to use different techniques as his career developed.

== See also ==
- Mosaic
- Sculpture
- Emile Norman
