= Tormod =

- Gender: Masculine
- Language: Norwegian, Scottish Gaelic

Origin
- Language: Old Norse

Other names
- Variant form: Thormod
- Anglicisation: Norman

Tormod is a masculine Norwegian and Scottish Gaelic given name. The Norwegian name (with the variant Thormod) is derived from Old Norse Þórmóðr, composed of the elements Þorr, the name of the Norse god of thunder, and móðr, meaning 'mind, courage'. The Gaelic name is derived either from Þórmóðr or from Þormundr, in which the second element is mundr, meaning 'protection'. It is customarily anglicised as Norman, an etymologically unrelated name.

In Ireland, the Old Norse name gave rise to the name Tormach, which survives in the surname Tormey (from Irish Ó Tormaigh, 'descendant of Tormach').

== People with the given name ==
- Tormod Andreassen, Norwegian curler
- Tormod Caimbeul (1942–2015), Scottish Gaelic writer
- Tormod Granheim (born 1974), Norwegian adventurer and motivational speaker
- Tormod Haugen (1945–2008), Norwegian author
- Tormod Kristoffer Hustad (1889–1973), Norwegian architect and politician
- Tormod Kark, slave and friend of Håkon Sigurdsson
- Tormod Knutsen (1932–2021), Norwegian Nordic combined athlete
- Tormod MacGill-Eain (1937–2017), Scottish Gaelic comedian, novelist, poet, musician and broadcaster
- Tormod MacLeod (fl. 13th century), a Scottish clan chief
- Tormod Mobraaten (1910–1991), Norwegian-Canadian skier
- Tormod Skagestad (1920–1997), Norwegian poet, novelist, playwright, actor and theatre director
- Tormod Petter Svennevig (1929–2016), Norwegian diplomat and politician
