= Jim Norman =

Jim Norman may refer to:

- Jim Norman (baseball) (1883–?), American baseball player
- Jim Norman (footballer) (1928–2017), Australian rules footballer
- Jim Norman (musician) (born 1948), Canadian drummer, producer and composer
- Jim Ed Norman (born 1948), American musician, record producer, arranger and label head
- Jim Norman (politician) (born 1953), American politician

== See also ==
- Jimmy Norman (1937–2011), American rhythm and blues and jazz musician and songwriter
- Jimmy Norman (Galway Bay FM) (born 1970), radio presenter
- James Norman (disambiguation)
