= Nordman (disambiguation) =

Nordman is a Swedish musical group.

Nordman may also refer to:

- Nordman (surname)
- Nordman, Idaho, unincorporated community in Bonner County, Idaho

== See also ==
- Nordmann, a surname
- Nordman, a brand of cold-weather boots
- Nordmann fir
