= In This Our Life =

1942 film by John Huston

- Theatrical release poster
- Directed by: John Huston
- Screenplay by: Howard Koch
- Based on: In This Our Life; 1941 novel by Ellen Glasgow
- Produced by: Hal B. Wallis
- Starring: Bette Davis; Olivia de Havilland; George Brent; Dennis Morgan; Charles Coburn; Frank Craven; Billie Burke
- Cinematography: Ernest Haller
- Edited by: William Holmes
- Music by: Max Steiner
- Distributed by: Warner Bros. Pictures
- Release date: May 8, 1942
- Running time: 97 minutes
- Country: United States
- Language: English
- Budget: $713,000
- Box office: $2.8 million

In This Our Life is a 1942 American drama film starring Bette Davis and Olivia de Havilland as sisters and rivals in romance and life. This was the third of six films in which de Havilland and Davis starred together. The film was directed mostly by John Huston, in his second film, but when Huston was called to a war assignment, an uncredited Raoul Walsh completed the film. The screenplay was written by Howard Koch based on the 1941 Pulitzer Prize-winning novel of the same title by Ellen Glasgow.

Completed in 1942, the film was rejected in 1943 for foreign release by the wartime Office of Censorship because it deals truthfully with racial discrimination in its plot.

== Plot ==
In Richmond, Virginia, Asa and Lavinia Timberlake have two daughters with male names, Roy and Stanley. Roy, a successful interior decorator, is married to Dr. Peter Kingsmill. Stanley is engaged to progressive attorney Craig Fleming. One evening, with days until her wedding, Stanley runs off with her sister's husband Peter. Craig becomes depressed, but Roy decides to keep a positive, although somewhat hardened, attitude. After Roy divorces Peter, he and Stanley marry and move to Baltimore.

After some time, Roy encounters Craig sitting dejectedly on a park bench. Observing his sad, neglected appearance, she encourages him to embrace life, and they begin dating. Roy refers a young black man named Parry Clay to Craig, who hires him to work in his law office while attending law school. Parry is the son of Minerva Clay, the Timberlakes' long-time housekeeper.

Roy and Stanley's uncle, William Fitzroy, had doted on his niece Stanley and gave her expensive presents and money. Fitzroy is upset that she has run off with Peter. He says that he will send Craig some of his legal business if he agrees to stop representing poor clients. When Craig refuses, Roy is impressed and agrees to marry him.

In Baltimore, Stanley and Peter's marriage suffers from his heavy drinking and her excessive spending. Deeply depressed, Peter commits suicide. Shaken, Stanley returns to her hometown with Roy. After she recovers, Stanley decides to win back Craig. While discussing her late husband's life insurance with Craig at his office, Stanley invites him to join her later for dinner. He does not go to the restaurant, and she gets drunk. While driving home, she hits a mother and her young daughter, severely injuring the woman and killing the child. In a panic, Stanley drives away.

The police find Stanley's abandoned car with blood on the front end and question her. She lies, telling them that she loaned her car to Parry on the night of the fatal accident. On the strength of the accusation, Parry is jailed. However, Roy suspects that Stanley is hiding the truth, and Parry's mother said he was home with her all evening, studying. Stanley refuses to admit her responsibility, even when Roy arranges for her to see Parry at the jail. Stanley tries to convince Parry to confirm her story. Later, her ex-fiance Craig confronts her once more after questioning the bartender at the restaurant, who remembered seeing Stanley. Craig knows that Stanley left the restaurant, drunk, just before the time of the fatal accident. Craig plans to take Stanley to the district attorney, but she flees to Fitzroy's house and pleads for his help. However, having just learned that he has only six months to live, Fitzroy is too distraught to do anything for Stanley. Stanley is chased by the police; she crashes her car and dies.

Craig is attempting to comfort Roy as she anxiously frets about how to help her sister, when the authorities call to inform them that Stanley died.

== Cast ==
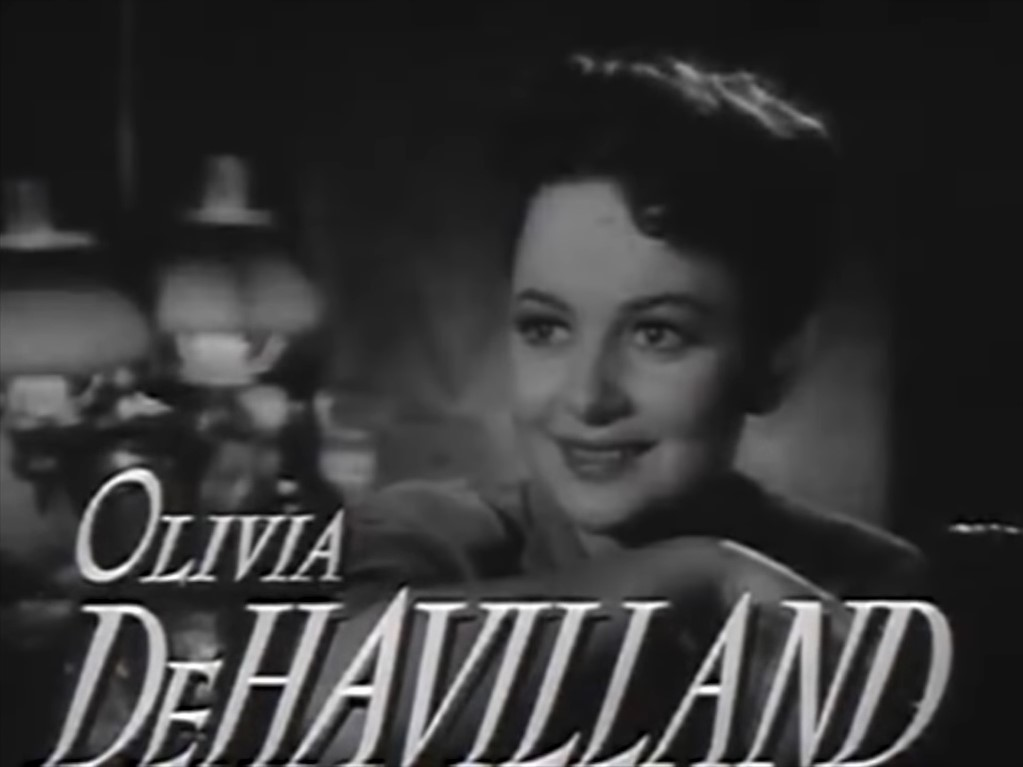
Olivia de Havilland from the trailer for In This Our Life

- Bette Davis as Stanley Timberlake Kingsmill
- Olivia de Havilland as Roy Timberlake Fleming
- George Brent as Craig Fleming
- Dennis Morgan as Peter Kingsmill
- Frank Craven as Asa Timberlake
- Billie Burke as Lavinia Timberlake
- Charles Coburn as William Fitzroy
- Ernest Anderson as Parry Clay
- Hattie McDaniel as Minerva Clay
- Lee Patrick as Betty Wilmoth
- Mary Servoss as Charlotte Fitzroy
- William B. Davidson as Jim Purdy
- Edward Fielding as Dr. Buchanan
- John Hamilton as Inspector
- William Forrest as Forest Ranger
- Walter Huston as Bartender (uncredited)

== Production ==
=== Development ===
The Ellen Glasgow novel, for which Warner Bros. Pictures paid $40,000 for screen rights, portrayed William Fitzroy's incestuous desire for his niece Stanley Timberlake Kingsmill as well as racist attitudes in Richmond society. Screenwriter Howard Koch, who was recommended by the film's director John Huston, deemphasized the book's controversial themes in his script in order to satisfy the current Motion Picture Production Code.

Another significant departure from the novel is the film's happy ending created for Roy Timberlake (Olivia de Havilland) and Craig Fleming (George Brent). In his review of the completed film, the critic Bosley Crowther said that it was "moderately faithful" to the novel and praised its portrayal of racial discrimination.

Bette Davis had wished to play the "good sister" Roy but was eventually cast as Stanley, a role for which she felt she was too old. Davis was unhappy with the script, later recalling: "The book by Miss Glasgow was brilliant. I never felt the script lived up to the book." Davis also claimed that Glasgow disliked the screenplay, saying: "She minced no words about the film. She was disgusted with the outcome. I couldn't have agreed with her more. A real story had been turned into a phony film." David Lewis wrote Davis "didn’t like the film at all, and I can’t say as I blame her."

=== Casting ===
Davis was also unhappy about events during production. While in the midst of costume and wig fittings, Davis learned that her husband Arthur Farnsworth had been admitted to a Minneapolis hospital with severe pneumonia. Her friend Howard Hughes arranged a private plane, but her flight took two days, grounded by fog and storms. Almost immediately, studio head Jack L. Warner cabled Davis to demand her return to the film. Under Warner's pressure and with concern for her husband, Davis' own health declined. Her doctor ordered her to return to Los Angeles by train to rest before returning to work.

Davis argued with the film's producers about nearly every aspect of her character. She directed her hairstyle and makeup and insisted that Orry-Kelly redesign her costumes; the result was what some considered an unflattering wardrobe. However, she aided the project by finding Ernest Anderson, a black waiter at the studio commissary, to play Parry Clay. Although Davis felt that the film was "mediocre," she expressed satisfaction that the role of Parry was "performed as an educated person. This caused a great deal of joy among Negroes. They were tired of the Stepin Fetchit vision of their people." Anderson won the 1942 National Board of Review Award for his performance.

David Lewis recalled:

John Huston was not the director to tackle this kind of project. He had a restless nature and he hated the rather mild and dawdling atmosphere of the book and our script, so he did his best (or worst) to put action and drama into the proceedings. Bette, in choosing to play the bad sister, was miscast and she, too, tried to put fire in what was at best a rather quiet sinner. To further add to the confusion, John and Olivia had a rip-roaring affair during the making of the film, prompting Bette to be sure they were both conspiring against her.

Three days after the Japanese attack on Pearl Harbor, Huston was forced to leave the production for an assignment with the United States Department of War. The studio employed Raoul Walsh to complete the film, although he received no screen credit. Walsh and Davis immediately clashed, and she refused to follow his direction or to reshoot completed scenes. She developed laryngitis and was absent from the set for several days. After she returned, the producer Hal B. Wallis frequently acted as mediator between Davis and Walsh, who threatened to quit.

Because of the delays, the film was not completed until mid-January 1942, far past the scheduled date. Response to the first preview screening was highly negative, with audience comments especially critical of Davis' hair, makeup and wardrobe, the elements that she had controlled. Preparing for her role in Now, Voyager, Davis disregarded the comments. When the U.S. wartime Office of Censorship reviewed the film in 1943 before foreign release, it disapproved the work, stating: "It is made abundantly clear that a Negro's testimony in court is almost certain to be disregarded if in conflict with the testimony of a white person."

== Reception ==
In a contemporary review for The New York Times, critic Bosley Crowther called In This Our Life "neither a pleasant nor edifying film" and wrote that "the one exceptional component of the film" is the "brief but frank allusion to racial discrimination ... presented in a realistic manner, uncommon to Hollywood, by the definition of the Negro as an educated and comprehending character. Otherwise the story is pretty much of a downhill run." He concluded with an assessment of Davis in the role of Stanley: "In short, her evil is so theatrical and so completely inexplicable that her eventual demise in an auto accident is the happiest moment in the film."

Variety noted: "John Huston, in his second directorial assignment, provides deft delineations in the varied characters in the script. Davis is dramatically impressive in the lead but gets major assistance from Olivia de Havilland, George Brent, Dennis Morgan, Billie Burke and Hattie McDaniel. Script succeeds in presenting the inner thoughts of the scheming girl, and carries along with slick dialog and situations. Strength is added in several dramatic spots by Huston's direction."

== Box office ==
According to Warner Bros. records, the film earned $1,651,000 domestically and $1,143,000 foreign. Lewis said "strangely, the film did very well and made quite a lot of money. I never knew why; maybe it was the cast. I doubt if the Pulitzer added much to its commercial value."

== Home media ==
On April 1, 2008, Warner Home Video released the film as part of the box set The Bette Davis Collection, Volume 3, which includes The Old Maid, Watch on the Rhine, Deception and All This, and Heaven Too.

== See also ==
- John Huston filmography

== Notes ==
- Lewis, David (1993). Curtis, James (ed.). The Creative Producer. Metuchen: Scarecrow Press. ISBN 0-8108-2720-4.
