= Virginia (novel) =

1913 novel by Ellen Glasgow

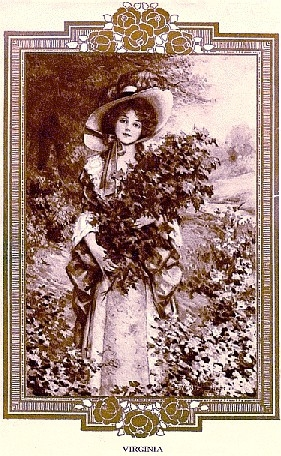
- The frontispiece of the first edition
- Author: Ellen Glasgow
- Language: English
- Genre: Novel
- Publication date: 1913
- Media type: Print (hardback & paperback)

Virginia (1913) is a novel by Ellen Glasgow about a wife and mother who in vain seeks happiness by serving her family. This novel, her eleventh, marked a clear departure from Glasgow's previous work—she had written a series of bestsellers before publishing Virginia—in that it attacked, in a subtle yet unmistakable way, the very layer of society that constituted her readership. Also, as its heroine, though virtuous and god-fearing, is denied the happiness she is craving, its plot did not live up to readers' expectations as far as poetic justice is concerned and was bound to upset some of them. Today, Virginia is seen by many as an outstanding achievement in Glasgow's career, exactly because the author defied literary convention by questioning the foundations of American society around the dawn of the 20th century, be it capitalism, religion or racism.

== Plot ==
Born in 1864 to a clergyman and his dutiful wife, Virginia grows up as a Southern belle in the town of Dinwiddie, Virginia. Her education is strictly limited to the bare minimum, with anything that might disturb her quiet and comfortable existence vigorously avoided. Thus prepared for life, Virginia falls for the first handsome young man who crosses her path—Oliver Treadwell, the black sheep of a family of capitalist entrepreneurs who, during the time of Reconstruction, brought industry and the railroad to the South. Oliver, who has been abroad and has only recently arrived in Dinwiddie, is a dreamer and an intellectual. An aspiring playwright, his literary ambitions are more important to him than money, and he refuses his uncle's offer to work in his bank. However, when Virginia falls in love with him he realizes that he must be able to support a family, and eventually accepts his uncle's offer to work for the railroad.

The young couple get married and have three children, a boy and two girls. Gradually perfecting her household skills, Virginia is able to get by on very little money. When, after many years, Oliver's first play is put on the stage in New York City, his expectations are high. However, the show is a complete failure as the play is far too intellectual and radical for a Broadway audience who wants to be entertained rather than reformed. Reading about the flop in the local newspaper, Virginia for the first time in her life leaves her children, asking her mother to take care of them for a day or two, and takes the night train to New York to be with, and console, her husband—only to be rejected by him, who is in a state of severe depression. When he has recovered from the shock, Oliver makes yet another concession to society and public taste and starts writing "trash".

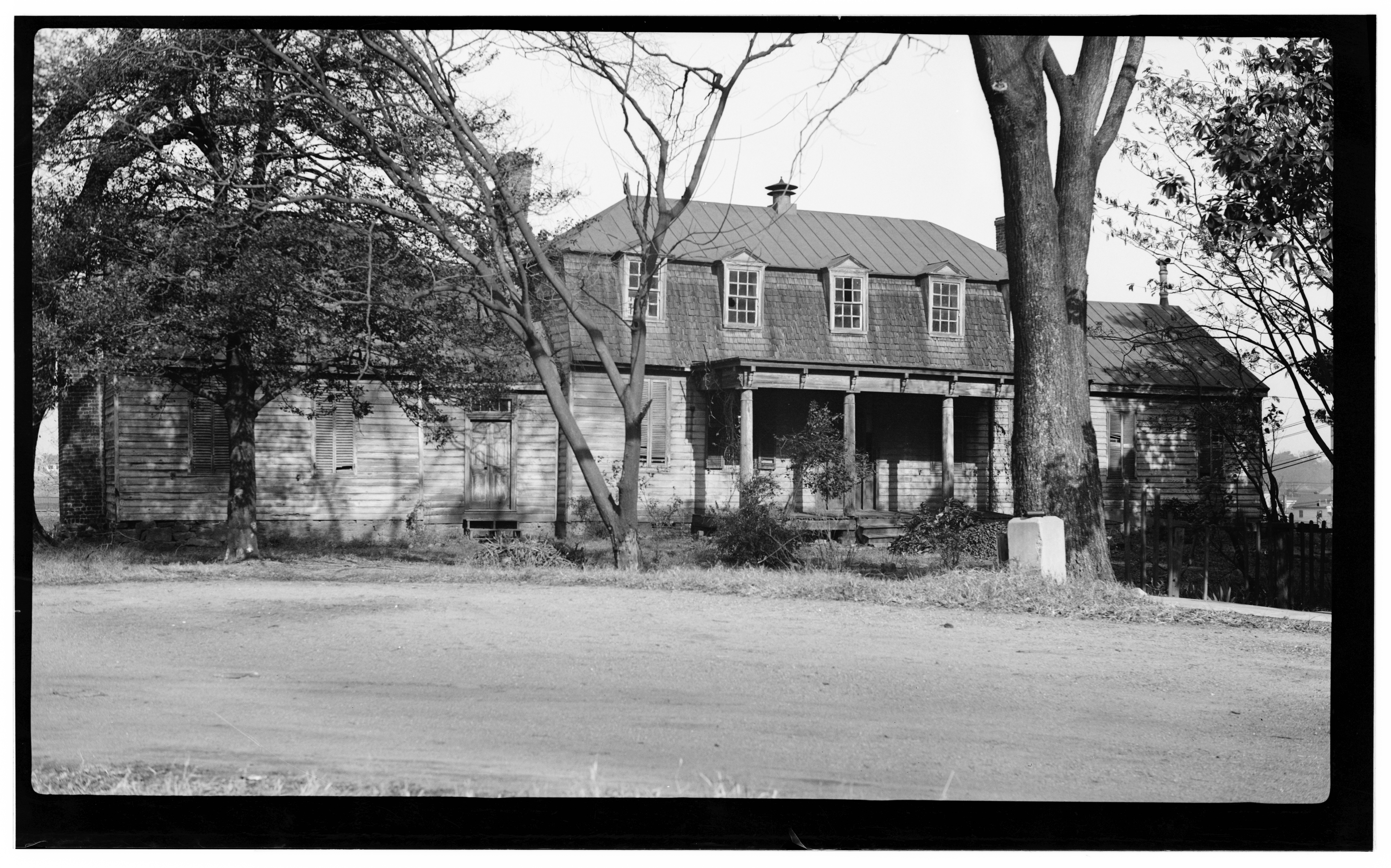
The Alexander Strachan House, Petersburg, which figures in the novel

Throughout the years, Virginia leads a vicarious life: She is happy when her husband and children are happy; she makes sure their clothes are in perfect condition while neglecting her own outward appearance; and she is eager to provide for her children the education she herself has been denied. When, at one point, she realizes that the women her age whom she has known since childhood still look quite young while she has aged prematurely, she quickly persuades herself to believe that a life of altruistic subservience is more than worthwhile, that living and acting the way she does is her duty and God's will. Her father's sudden if honourable death—he unsuccessfully tries to prevent the lynching of an innocent young African American and is stabbed in the process by an angry and drunken young man—adds to the gloom that starts creeping into her life, especially when she sees that, as a widow, her mother suddenly loses all her will to live. When she dies only a few months after her husband, Virginia has a premonition that her own fate when losing Oliver could be a similar one.

Meanwhile, Oliver's first successful play—a trashy one—premières in New York, with some more to follow in quick succession, and, as the money keeps pouring in, the family move into a bigger house in Dinwiddie. They now employ a number of servants, including an African American butler. With the children gone—their son and one daughter are at college, while the other daughter has married a much older widower with two grown-up children and has also flown the nest—and Oliver frequently in New York to supervise the staging of his plays, Virginia's life becomes increasingly empty. Having "outlived her usefulness", the days seem endless to her, and with all the servants about the house there is absolutely no housework for her to do either. Now in her mid-forties, Virginia for the first time in her life spends Christmas alone at home.

The biggest blow, however, is yet to come: When she accompanies Oliver to New York for a première, she finds out to her dismay that he has been betraying her with a famous actress who stars in one of his plays. For the last time summoning up all her courage, she takes a taxi and pays her an unexpected call but immediately realizes when talking to her that she has no chance of winning her husband back. Without many words, Oliver asks her to let him divorce her, but clinging to the only thing she has left in her life—her marriage—she refuses. The novel ends on a somewhat optimistic note when Virginia, again alone in the empty house in Dinwiddie, receives a letter from her son telling her that he is going to leave Oxford before he has completed his two-year course at the university in order to come back and stay with his mother.
