= Ernest Anderson (actor) =

American actor

- Ernest Anderson in In This Our Life, 1942
- Born: August 25, 1915; Lynn, Massachusetts
- Died: March 5, 2011 (aged 95); DeLand, Florida
- Occupation: Actor

Ernest Anderson (August 25, 1915 – March 5, 2011) was an American actor. He became known for his role as an African American paralegal and law student who is falsely accused of manslaughter by a white woman in the Warner Bros. film In This Our Life in 1942. For his performance, he received a National Board of Review Award for Best Actor in 1942.

== Biography ==
Anderson attended Dunbar High School in Washington, D.C. and later earned a bachelor's degree from Northwestern University School of Drama and Speech.

Anderson moved to Hollywood, taking a non-acting service position at Warner Brothers before being signed by them for his first screen role, In This Our Life (1942). Bette Davis had arranged Anderson's interview for the part of Parry Clay in that film.

He began his World War II Army service by December 1942. That Christmas Eve, Bette Davis introduced Corporal Anderson to servicemen guests at the Hollywood Canteen. He returned to Warner Bros. after his service.

== Selected filmography ==
- In This Our Life (1942) - Parry Clay
- The Peanut Man (1947)
- The Well (1952) - Mr. Crawford
- 3 for Bedroom C - Train Porter
- Band Wagon (1953) - Train Porter
- North by Northwest (1959) - Porter
- Whatever Happened to Baby Jane (1962) - Ice cream cone seller
- Tick, Tick, Tick (1970) - Homer
- Coma (1978) - First Doctor
- Last of the Good Guys (1978) - Uncle Stan
- The Return (1980) - Dr. Mortorff
