= James Norman =

James or Jimmy Norman may refer to:

- James Norman (author), Australian columnist and author
- James B. Norman (born 1952), American photographer, author, and cultural historian
- James O'Higgins Norman (born 1968), Irish sociologist, author and academic
- James Thomas Norman (born 1934), American football offensive lineman
- Jimmy Norman (1937–2011), American rhythm and blues and jazz musician and a songwriter
- Jimmy Norman (Galway Bay FM) (born 1970), Irish radio presenter

== See also ==
- Jim Norman (disambiguation)
