= Leslie Norman =

Leslie Norman or Les Norman is the name of:

- Leslie Norman (director) (1911–1993), British film director
- Les Norman (politician) (1913–1997), Australian politician
- Les Norman (baseball) (born 1969), former Major League Baseball outfielder
- Les Norman (lacrosse) (1935–2010), former professional lacrosse player

== See also ==
- Norman (name)
- Norman Leslie (disambiguation)
