= Barren Ground (novel) =

1925 novel by Ellen Glasgow

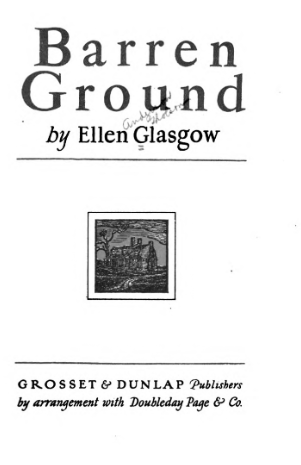
- Title page for Barren Ground (1925)
- Author: Ellen Glasgow
- Subject: Fiction
- Publication date: 1925
- Pages: 540
- ISBN: 9780156106856

Barren Ground is a 1925 novel by Ellen Glasgow giving an account of 30 years in the life of a woman in rural Virginia. Dorinda Oakley is an intelligent, independent and vibrant young lady who is trying find herself and her purpose in life by moving to New York after a love disillusion.

== Plot ==
Dorinda Oakley, daughter of a land-poor farmer in Virginia, at 20 goes to work in Nathan Pedlar's store. She falls in love with Jason Greylock, weak-willed son of the village doctor, and forgets her purpose of helping her father to rebuild the farm, but soon before their planned wedding Jason is forced to marry a former fiancée. Bitterly disillusioned and pregnant, Dorinda seeks work in New York City, where she is injured and miscarries in a street accident. She is attended by Dr. Faraday, who later employs her as a nurse for his children. A young doctor proposes to her, but she refuses him, determined to “find something else in life.”

After her father's death, Dorinda returns to the family farm, which is impoverished and overgrown with broomsedge. Having studied scientific agriculture in New York, she introduces progressive methods, gradually returning the "barren ground" to fertility and creating a prosperous dairy farm. Her mother becomes an invalid after her brother Rufus is questioned for murder, and Dorinda only can rely on the aid of a few farm laborers. After her mother's death, she marries Nathan Pedlar to provide a home for his children, and after he dies, she shelters Jason, now penniless and ill from excessive drinking. He soon dies.

== Bibliography ==
Title: Barren Ground Modern library of the world's best books Author: Ellen Anderson Gholson Glasgow Editor: Doubleday, Page & Company, 1925 Page Nº: 511 pages
