= Roger Norman =

Roger Norman may refer to:

- Roger Norman (racing driver), professional offroad racing competitor
- Roger Norman (athlete) (1928–1995), Swedish triple jumper
- Roger Norman (novelist) (born 1948), British novelist

== See also ==
- Roger von Norman (1908–2000), Hungarian-born German film editor and director
