= The Shadowy Third and Other Stories =

First edition (publ. Doubleday, Page)

The Shadowy Third and Other Stories is a 1923 short story collection by Ellen Glasgow. Glasgow published only this one short story collection during her lifetime, which included seven stories. While Glasgow's novels receive more critical attention, scholarship on her stories continues into the twenty-first century.

== Plot summaries ==
The first four stories are often categorized as ghost stories.

In "The Shadowy Third" the first-person narrator, Miss Randolph, is employed as Mrs. Maradick's nurse by her husband Doctor Maradick. Miss Randolph comes to see Mrs. Maradick as a victim and not as a patient suffering from hallucinations, as Doctor Maradick insists. The ghost of Mrs. Maradick's daughter, Dorothea, haunts the story and the reader is left to determine if Dorothea's well-placed jumping rope resulted in Doctor Maradick's accidental death.

"Dare's Gift" includes Meredith Beckwith's story and Lucy Dare's story and is told in two parts. Meredith Beckwith betrays her husband by giving information to an investigator and, thereby, crippling her husband's case. Lucy Dare chooses the Confederate cause over her fiance's life, revealing his hiding place. Both told by male narrators, the suggested relationship between the stories may be summarized by the statement that both protagonists make in the story: "I had to do it....I would do it again!"

In "The Past" Mr. Vanderbridge's memories of his deceased first wife keep him from living in the present. His second wife attempts to break the past's hold over him (and her) by burning the letters that reveal his first wife's infidelity.

"Whispering Leaves" depicts Mammy Rhody as the faithful slave, capable of protecting and saving her young charge, Pell, from death in a fire, even after her own death. Scholar Richard Meeker suggests that Mammy Rhody was modeled after Glasgow's "mammy," who is discussed in her posthumously published memoir, The Woman Within (1954).

Anthologized as a mystery story, "A Point in Morals" asks readers to unravel the identity of one or multiple murderers and to judge the psychologist's response to the passenger's narrative.

"The Difference" illumines the limitations of wives in the early twentieth century when confronted with their husbands' infidelity.

"Jordan's End" portrays the last moments of the progressive demise of the Jordan household. The physician-narrator leaves the reader to decide the source of Alan Jordan's death. Often connected to Edgar Allan Poe's The Fall of the House of Usher, some scholars group "Jordan's End" with the first four stories of the collection.

== Publication history ==
The collection includes seven stories: "The Shadowy Third," "Dare's Gift," "The Past," "Whispering Leaves," "A Point in Morals," "The Difference," and "Jordan's End." All of the stories, except for "Jordan's End," were originally published in magazines, such as Harper’s Magazine, Scribner’s Magazine, and Good Housekeeping. All seven stories from The Shadowy Third and Other Stories are included in Richard K. Meeker's The Collected Stories of Ellen Glasgow (1963), a posthumously-published collection of all of Glasgow's short stories. Meeker arranged these stories based on their initial magazine publications. The stories included in The Shadowy Third and Other Stories are also included in this collection without revision from the original collection. Meeker frames The Collected Stories of Ellen Glasgow with an editor's preface and introduction, which discusses sociocultural context as it relates to the time period in which Glasgow wrote her stories.

== Scholarship ==
In his introduction to The Collected Stories of Ellen Glasgow, Meeker offers possible influences on Glasgow's story writing, including the progression of Glasgow’s failed relationship with Henry Anderson, influences of Darwinism, Edgar Allan Poe’s narrative style, and representations of new emerging psychological knowledge as an historical theme.

Lynette Carpenter and Wendy K. Kolmar include Glasgow's stories in their sociohistorical examination of ghost stories written by American women writers, Haunting the House of Fiction: Female Perspectives on Ghost Stories by American Women.

== Reception ==
Reception of The Shadowy Third and Other Stories was favorable in the early twentieth century. "The Shadowy Third" was also adapted in the BBC television series Ghosts (season 1, episode 4) in 1995.
