= John Norman (disambiguation) =

John Norman is the pen name of John Frederick Lange Jr. (born 1931), American science fiction author.

John Norman may also refer to:

== Politics ==
- John Norman (mayor, fl. 1250), mayor of London
- John Norman (draper), (died 1468), Lord Mayor of London
- John Norman (16th century MP), member of the parliament of England for York
- John Norman (alderman) (1657–1724), English businessman and mayor of Norwich
- John A. Norman (1883–1956), member of the Wisconsin State Assembly
- John Norman (Australian politician) (1855–1912), member of the Queensland Legislative Assembly
- John S. Norman, member of the Kansas House of Representatives

== Sport ==
- John Norman (cyclist) (1883–1916), British cyclist
- John Norman (cricketer) (born 1936), English cricketer
- John Norman (footballer) (born 1971), English footballer, see List of Bury F.C. players (1–24 appearances)
- John Norman Jnr (born 1974), Canadian darts player
- John Norman (ice hockey) (born 1991), Swedish ice hockey player

== Other ==
- John Norman (publisher) (1748–1817), American engraver and publisher
- John Paxton Norman (1819–1871), acting chief justice of the Calcutta High Court
- John Roxborough Norman (1898–1944), British ichthyologist
- John David Norman (1927–2011), American sex offender and child sex trafficker
- John Charles Norman (born 1966), graphic designer, advertising executive

== See also ==
- Jack Norman (1909–1994), Australian footballer
