= Nordmann =

Nordmann is the demonym of the Norwegian people in its native language (see: Norman).

It is also a surname. Notable people with the surname include:

- Alexander von Nordmann (1803–1866), Finnish zoologist
- Armand von Nordmann (1759–1809), Austrian general of the Napoleonic era
- Bevo Nordmann (1939–2015), American basketball player
- Charles Nordmann (1881–1940) French astronomer
- François Nordmann (born 1942), Swiss diplomat
- Johann Nordmann (1820–1887), Austrian journalist and travel writer
- Karl-Gottfried Nordmann (1915–1982), German World War II fighter pilot
- Lillie Nordmann (born 2002), American competitive swimmer
- Moïse Nordmann (1809-1884), Alsatian rabbi
- Roger Nordmann (1973), Swiss politician
- Theodor Nordmann (1918–1945), German World War II pilot

== See also ==
- Norwegian people
- Nordman (disambiguation)
