= Norman Leslie =

Norman Leslie may refer to:

- Norman Leslie (soldier) (died 1554), Scottish noble and soldier
- Norman Leslie, 19th Earl of Rothes (1877–1927), Scottish peer and soldier
- Norman Leslie of the Leslie baronets

== See also ==
- Leslie Norman (disambiguation)
