= The Peanut Man (film) =

1947 film

The Peanut Man is a 1947 American film about the life of George Washington Carver starring Clarence Muse. Muse won an interracial unity award for his role in the 45-minute film in 1949. In 1954, Jet magazine reported he was working on another Carver film at his Muse-a-White ranch in Perris, California as a test film for a planned feature film. Tony Paton was the producer for the test film.

Paton and Muse met on a flight to New Orleans. Ebony magazine headlined an article about the film stating it "Indicts Hollywood Race Bias". A continuity cutting for the film was deposited with the New York State Archives.

Maidie Norman made her film debut in the film. A poster for the film touts it as the "First Colored Feature Film in Glorious Natural Colors".

== Cast ==
- Clarence Muse as George Washington Carver
- Ernest Anderson as Robert
- Maidie Norman as Lucretia
- Shelby Bacon as Augustus
- Wade Crosby as Jeffries
- Ray Teal as Dr. Miller
- Bernard Gorcey as Murphy
