= The Deliverance =

1904 novel by Ellen Glasgow

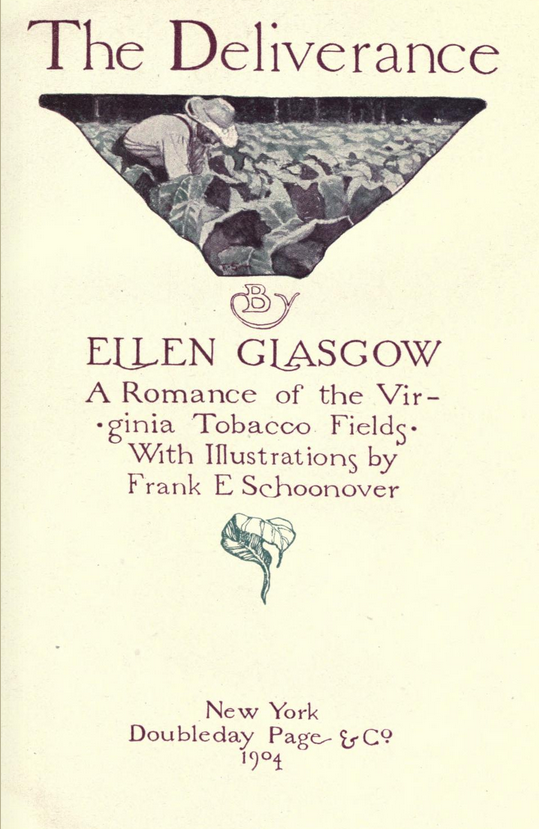
- Title page to first edition
- Author: Ellen Glasgow
- Illustrator: Frank Schoonover
- Language: English
- Genre: Novel
- Publisher: Doubleday Page & Co.
- Publication date: January 1904
- Publication place: United States
- Media type: Print (hardcover)
- Pages: 543 pp

The Deliverance: A Romance of the Virginia Tobacco Fields is a 1904 novel by American author Ellen Glasgow. It was the second-best selling book in the United States in 1904.

In combination with her two prior novels Voice of the People (1900) and The Battle-Ground (1902), these three works tell a history of Virginia starting from the American Civil War through the start of the twentieth century.

The frontispiece of the novel and illustrations were done by Frank Schoonover.

== Synopsis ==
A synopsis of the book published in 1910 states:

This is a romance of the Virginia tobacco fields and has its central figure Christopher Blake. He is the descendant of a rich and aristocratic family, and through reduced fortunes is obligated to work as a laborer on the estate which for generations has been owned by his forebears. Upon the death of his father, when he is only ten years old, he suddenly finds home and fortune snatched from him, and with a blind mother and two sisters to support he begins a life of toil. He foregoes education and drudges unceasingly that his mother may be kept ignorant of her change of fortune and that his twin sister may not have to work. After fifteen years of this existence his nature becomes hardened and his heart is filled with hatred for Mr. Fletcher, the past manager of the estate, who is now its possessor. Fletcher, who is a vulgar and ugly tempered man, has gained his possessions by cheating and dishonesty, and Christopher's one though from childhood has been a desire for revenge. He finds his opportunity in leading to ruin Fletcher's grandson, Will, a weak young fellow, who is idolized by his grandfather. Christopher leads him into dissipation and teaches him to despise his grandfather till finally in a moment of drunken frenzy he kills him. Then Christopher realizes the enormity of his sin, aids Will to escape, and takes the punishment. He goes to prison to serve out a five years' sentence, but after three years have passed, he is pardoned through the efforts of Maria Wyndham, Fletcher's granddaughter, whom he has loved for years. Maria, who has returned his affection and is now the heir to the estate, is only too glad to restore it to its rightful owner, and the lovers, and their many years of unhappiness, are at least united.
