= Michael Norman =

Michael Norman may refer to:

- Mick Norman (born 1933), English cricketer
- Michael Norman (Australian cricketer) (born 1952)
- Michael Norman (author) (1947–2021), American author
- Michael Norman (sprinter) (born 1997), American track and field athlete
- Mike Norman (born 1958), American racer
