= Seth Walker Norman =

American judge (1934–2024)

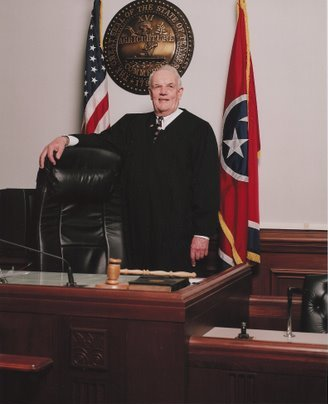
- Judge Norman in court

Judge of Division IV of the Criminal Court for Nashville, Davidson County, Tennessee
- In office 1990–2018
- Succeeded by: Jennifer L. Smith

Tennessee House of Representatives
- In office 1962–1964

Tennessee Democratic Executive Committee
- In office 1964–1972

Personal details
- Born: April 6, 1934 Nashville, Tennessee, U.S.
- Died: September 25, 2023 (aged 89) Nashville, Tennessee, U.S.
- Party: Democratic
- Education: Vanderbilt University
- Occupation: Judge
- Profession: Law

Military service
- Branch/service: U S Air Force; Tennessee Air National Guard
- Years of service: 1953–1957; 1957-1963
- Unit: 581st Air Resupply and Communications Wing

Seth Walker Norman (April 6, 1934 – September 25, 2023) was an American judge, state representative, and airman. He served on the Tennessee House of Representatives from 1962 to 1964. In 1990, he was elected Judge of Division IV of the Criminal Court for Nashville, Davidson County, Tennessee. As a judge, he founded the first and only court-operated residential drug court in the United States. He was a Democrat.

== Early life ==
Norman was born in Nashville on April 6, 1934, to John Edward (Jack) Norman and Carrie Laura Sneed Norman. He graduated from Duncan Preparatory School for Boys in 1951, enrolling that September at Vanderbilt University. He voluntarily withdrew from Vanderbilt in September 1952 to enter military service.

== Military service ==
Norman entered the United States Air Force on January 5, 1953, and attended basic training at Lackland Air Force Base, San Antonio, Texas before assignment to Keesler Field, Biloxi, Mississippi for electronics school. Norman applied for flight training in June 1953. He was assigned to the Aviation Cadet Training Pre-flight Program at Lackland Air Force Base in July, and then to Basic Observer Navigation training at Harlingen Air Force Base in Texas in September. He undertook Advanced Navigation Training at James Connolly Air Force Base, Waco, Texas in July, 1954; he then completed training and commissioned as a 2nd Lieutenant in November 1954. In January 1955 Norman was assigned to the 581st Air Resupply Squadron at Kadena Air Force Base, Okinawa, specifically as a navigator on a Boeing B-29 Superfortress crew, though he also flew Douglas C-47 Skytrain, Fairchild C-119 Flying Boxcar, Douglas C-118 Liftmaster, Martin B-26 Marauder, Douglas C-54 Skymaster and Grumman SA-16's. He was then reassigned to Brookley Air Force Base in Mobile, Alabama in July 1956, where he was a navigator on the Douglas C-124 Globemaster II.

Norman was released from active duty in September 1957. He then joined the Tennessee Air National Guard and remained there for six years.

== Politics ==
In 1960 Norman was elected President of Davidson County Young Democrats. He was elected in August 1962 to the Tennessee House of Representatives, and in 1964 and 1968 won election to the Tennessee Democratic Executive Committee, where he served for four years as Secretary. In 1968 he was a delegate to the Democratic National Convention; he served also on the Democratic National Platform Committee.

== Legal career ==
Norman returned to Vanderbilt in 1957. He entered the Nashville School of Law in September 1958, graduating in June 1962, and received his license to practice law in Tennessee. He entered the private practice of law with his father and brother.

In 1990 Norman was elected Judge of Division IV of the Criminal Court for Nashville, Davidson County, Tennessee. He was re-elected to the position in 1998 and again in 2006 without opposition.

Norman founded the Davidson County Drug Court, a long-term residential treatment program for non-violent felony offenders, over which he presides alongside his responsibilities as a criminal court judge. The program was the first court-operated residential drug court in the United States.

As of January 2009, Norman served on the Governor's Criminal Justice Committee and the Safe & Drug Free Schools and Communities Advisory Committee for the United States Department of Education. He was the founder and chairman of the Nashville Drug Court Support Foundation. He wrote many articles on drug courts and his drug court has been cited in many national publications.

== Death ==
Norman died on September 25, 2023, at the age of 89.
