= Norman B. Norman =

- Born: Norman B. Norman; 1914
- Died: 1991 (age 77); Miami, Florida, US
- Education: B.A. Columbia University
- Occupation: Advertising executive
- Known for: co-founder of Norman, Craig & Kummel
- Spouse: Gail Snyder
- Children: 2

Norman B. Norman (1914–1991) was an American advertising executive who co-founded the Norman, Craig & Kummel advertising agency.

== Biography ==
Norman B. Norman was born to a Jewish family in New York City. In 1934, he graduated from Columbia University. After school, he worked as an unpaid assistant at the Biow Agency founded by Milton H. Biow. After six months, he was given a salary of $5 a week, and after two years, he was making $25 per week. While at the Biow Agency, he worked in all areas of the business including research, new business, and account management. In 1942, he joined the United States Navy where he served during World War II on a minesweeper as a lieutenant; he was awarded a Bronze Star.

After the war, he worked for the Norman A. Mack & Company as an executive vice president and then in 1948, he accepted a position with the William H. Weintraub & Company. In 1955, he along with fellow Weintraub co-workers, Eugene H. Kummel and Walter Craig, bought the William H. Weintraub agency and renamed it Norman, Craig & Kummel. In 1957, he was elected president of the agency and pioneered the concept of what he called "emotional advertising" aimed at having the reader find himself inside the advertisement. The tenets were summed up in one word: P-E-O-P-L-E: Put people in the sell; Excitingly different look and sound; Open the way through the heart-not the head; Put in an important reason why; Living visuals people will talk about; Eliminate any non-preemptive selling proposition. The firm won many major clients including Colgate-Palmolive, Revlon, Ronson, Chanel, Liggett & Myers, and Olin Corporation. In 1956, the firm won the U.S. Democratic National Committee account and its presidential candidate Adlai Stevenson, going head-to-head with its rival Batten, Barton, Durstine & Osborn.

In 1961, the firm was renamed the NCK Organization. In 1979, he retired as president and chairman of the board; he served as honorary chairman until 1985. By 1982, the NCK Organization had 1,184 employees in 32 offices worldwide with $433 million in sales and $70 million in income. In 1983, the firm merged with Foote, Cone & Belding Communications and ceased to exist under its own name.

Norman served as the director of the Association for a Better New York and as a trustee of the New York Police Foundation.

== Personal life ==
Norman was married to Gail Snyder; they had two children: Peter Norman and Susan Norman Blumenthal. They had homes in Woodstock, Vermont, in Fairfield, Connecticut, in the Cotswolds of England, and in Key Largo, Florida. Norman died in Miami at the age of 77.
