= Norman Ture =

American researcher

- Born: Cleveland, Ohio, US
- Died: 1997
- Education: University of Chicago

Norman B. Ture was an American researcher.

== Biography ==
Norman Ture was born in Cleveland, Ohio. He studied at the University of Chicago.

In the 1960s, Ture worked with Wilbur Mills, who was the chairman of the United States House Committee on Ways and Means. In 1963, Mills announced tax cuts proposal during Kennedy administration in a speech that was written by Norman Ture.

In the 1980s, Ture served as an Undersecretary of the Treasury during the Reagan administration.

Ture was an advocate of supply-side economics and was best known for being the architect of the 1981 tax cuts. He worked as a scholar at the Institute for Research on the Economics of Taxation.

Ture died in 1997 due to pancreatic cancer.
