= Ó Tormaigh =

Irish surname

- Ó Tormaigh in a Gaelic type, note the lenited g in the name (gh) once appeared in Irish orthography with a dot above it, as pictured.
- Gender: Masculine
- Language: Irish

Origin
- Meaning: "descendant of Tormach"

Other names
- Variant form: Ó Tormadha
- Anglicisations: Tarmey, Tormey

Ó Tormaigh is a masculine surname in the Irish language. The name translates into English as "descendant of Tormach". The name Tormach is a Gaelic derivative of the Old Norse personal name Þórmóðr. A variant form of Ó Tormaigh is Ó Tormadha. Anglicised forms of the Irish surnames include: Tarmey and Tormey. According to Patrick Woulfe, the surname is generally found in the Irish Midlands and the south of Ulster.

The form of these Irish surnames for unmarried females is Ní Thormaigh and Ní Tormadha; both these names mean "daughter of the descendant of Tormach". The form of these Irish surnames for married females is Bean Uí Thormaigh and Bean Uí Thormadha, or simply Uí Thormaigh and Uí Thormadha; these names mean "wife of the descendant of Tormach".

== See also ==
- Irish people
