= In This Our Life (novel) =

1941 novel by Ellen Glasgow

- First edition (publ. Jonathan Cape)
- Author: Ellen Glasgow
- Publication date: January 1, 1941
- Awards: Pulitzer Prize for Novel (1942)

In This Our Life is a 1941 novel by the American writer Ellen Glasgow. It won the Pulitzer Prize for the Novel in 1942. The title is a quote from the sonnet sequence Modern Love by George Meredith: "Ah, what a dusty answer gets the soul/ When hot for certainties in this our life!"

== Reception ==
Sterling North, writing for the Chicago Daily News, provided a mixed review of the novel. North noted that the novel includes "distinguished prose"and "believable characters" and that Glasgow "can fashion a story with remarkable craftsmanship". However, North indicated the novel's "concepts are still in the artistic cul-de-sac which stopped so many of the famous writers of the 1920s. Even when her characters have a 'vein of iron' they are dangerously immature emotionally. [...] Sex, when mentioned, is in terms of romantic conquest, the 'destructive' impulse, light flirtation, or something slightly ugly. Otherwise emotional energy is spent in acquiring a 'vein of iron' or [...] selfish and trivial gratifications."

== Film adaptation ==
In 1941 Warner Brothers purchased the film rights for $40,000 and quickly began casting the film In This Our Life. In the end, the film starred Bette Davis and Olivia de Havilland as the sisters. Screenwriter Howard Koch adapted the novel for the screen, downplaying the incestuous aspect of William Fitzroy's relationship with his niece Stanley, and the portrayal of contemporary racial discrimination in the South. Koch also gave the characters played by Olivia de Havilland and George Brent a happy ending, together, that does not occur in the novel.
