= Paul Norman =

Paul Norman may refer to:

- Paul Norman (game designer) (born 1951), American video game designer
- Paul Norman (scientist) (1951–2004), British scientist
- Paul Norman (director) (born 1956), American pornographic film director
