= George Norman (cricketer, born 1890) =

English cricketer

Personal information
- Full name: George Norman
- Born: 23 August 1890; Westminster, London, England
- Died: 24 November 1964 (aged 74); Virginia Water, Surrey, England
- Nickname: Fridoca

Domestic team information
- Years: Team
- 1920: Essex

Career statistics
Competition	FC
Matches	4
Runs scored	44
Batting average	11.00
100s/50s	–/–
Top score	21
Balls bowled	18
Wickets	–
Bowling average	–
5 wickets in innings	–
10 wickets in match	–
Best bowling	–
Catches/stumpings	1/–
- Source: Cricinfo, 7 August 2010

George Norman (23 August 1890 – 24 November 1964) was an English cricketer. His batting hand and bowling style are unknown.

Norman made 4 first-class appearances for Essex in the 1920 County Championship, making his debut for the county against Gloucestershire. Norman represented Essex in 3 further first-class matches during the 1920 season, with his final first-class match coming against Somerset.

In his 4 first-class matches, he scored 44 runs at a batting average of 11.00, with a high score of 21. In the field he took a single catch.
