= Jim Norman (musician) =

Canadian musician

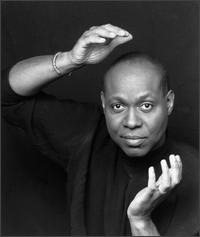
- Jim Norman by Michael Chamber, 2009
- Born: Montreal, Quebec, Canada
- Other names: Jim Norman
- Citizenship: Canadian
- Occupations: Percussionist, composer, record producer
- Years active: 1960s to 2009
- Height: 6 ft 2 in (188 cm)

Jim Norman is a Canadian percussionist, drummer, producer and composer based in Toronto, who is best known for his work in the fields of jazz, New Age trance and improvisation.

== Early life ==
Born in Montreal, Quebec, Norman is the son of a doctor and a historian/political activist. His interest in drumming came from his grandmother, who was also an academic, played drums in Greenwich Village in the 1940s and studied with the legendary jazz drummer Cozy Cole. Living in Jamaica and the West Indies as a boy, he studied classical guitar at the Foster Davis School of Music. He returned to North America in the 1960s, studying briefly at Alfred State University in upper N.Y. State, then Sir George Williams University in Montreal. He began his career in the arts in 1967.

== Musical career ==
During the 1980s and 1990s, Norman worked with the likes of Paul Shaffer, Carole Pope, Domenic Troiano, Jimmy Smith, Oliver Lake, Salome Bey, Oliver Schroer, and Tiger Okoshi. In addition to performing at New York City's infamous Knitting Factory, a recent concert produced by Thrum Records was aired on Bravo.

Norman is a student of tai chi, yoga, reiki, tao, meditation and breathing exercises and incorporates their philosophies into his musical compositions and singular drumming technique, which he refers to as "thrumming". -"Jazz for me represents an "edge" to an activity, a leading edge in its approach to the current thought, with a definite "off the cuff " in the execution. Thrumming is an approach to the drum machine AND the trap (contraption) set of drums, that calls for "playing" the machine in real time, repeating mistakes and all, while sitting and playing the kit."

== Equipment ==
Jim Norman's kit - Light Painting by Ivan Otis.

Norman's instrument is composed of approximately 35 drums, fifteen cymbals, gongs, rain-sticks, chimes, and over 50 other percussion sounds, some acoustic and some electronic. It has been referred to as a monstrous kit.

== Reviews ==
"All 18 compositions were recorded with no overdubbing and 13 of them in single takes. That's quite remarkable considering their complexity. And, Time Changes, Times Change is quite a remarkable album."

"The album (Time Changes, Times Change) seems like an extension of Miles Davis' early electric works, early Weather Report and '70s Euro-fusion from Jan Akkerman and Joachim Kuhn. There are powerful, driving qualities throughout."

== Releases ==
- Time Changes, Times Change: Dark Light Music Ltd. (1996)
- Improv: Thrum Records (1996)
- Beyond the Beginning - Visitor In Time
- Jim Norman: Skywalker Vision Quest DVD
- Jim Norman: Grafite live DVD
- Jim Norman Improv: XI Rhuthmos DVD
- Jim Norman: Grafite Live
