= Normanna =

Normanna can refer to:

- Normanna, Texas
- Normanna Township, Minnesota
