= Emile Norman =

American sculptor (1918–2009)

- Born: Emil Nomann; April 22, 1918; San Gabriel, California, U.S.
- Died: September 24, 2009 (aged 91); Monterey, California, U.S.
- Known for: Sculpture, mosaic, panel, jewelry
- Notable work: Mosaic window/stone sculptures Nob Hill Masonic Center; San Francisco, California, U.S.

Emile Norman (April 22, 1918 ‒ September 24, 2009), born Emil Nomann, was an American artist, widely known for his sculptures, mosaics, panels, and jewelry He was the subject of the 2006 PBS documentary, Emile Norman: By His Own Design.

== Background ==
Born in 1918 in San Gabriel, California, Norman was raised on a San Gabriel Valley walnut farm, his artistic talent obvious from an early age. He carved his first sculpture from a riverside rock at the age of 11, both ruining his father's chisels and gaining his respect.

After beginning his career in California and later moving to New York, he returned to California's Big Sur area in 1946, set up a studio in his home and gained a wider following. He lived and worked at his Big Sur property, Pfeiffer Ridge, with partner Brooks Clement, until Clement's 1973 death from cancer.

In the 1980s, the married actors Michael Tucker and Jill Eikenberry met Norman, purchased land from him in Big Sur, became his neighbors and close friends, and eventually spent five years producing a documentary on his life. It aired on PBS in 2006.

Norman died September 24, 2009, in Monterey, California at age 91, survived by three sisters, Marilyn Bogart, Mabel Malone and Edna Rhodes (Attorney Marc Del Piero is the trustee of the Emile Norman Charitable Trust).

== Career and work ==
"Nobody ever gives you permission to become an artist."

— Emile Norman

Norman began his professional career designing window displays for the Bullocks Wilshire department store in Los Angeles. He later moved to New York to design window displays for department stores including Bergdorf Goodman and Bonwit Teller — his work featured in Vogue and other periodicals. In 1946, he designed ornate headgear for performers in the 1946 Hollywood musical Blue Skies.

On a trip to Europe, he discovered an affinity for working with plastics, especially epoxy resin, which would ultimately become a mainstay of his work. His work was featured in a Manhattan gallery in 1944 and subsequently covered in The New York Times — noting Norman's innovative use of plastic as decorative rather than functional material. The show received positive reviews and quickly sold out.

In his work, Norman was known to use a technique combining admixtures of epoxy, crushed glass, plastic, and wood to create a cloisonne or stained glass effect. He also layered the material over wax forms, which were subsequently melted to leave a 3-dimensional sculpture.

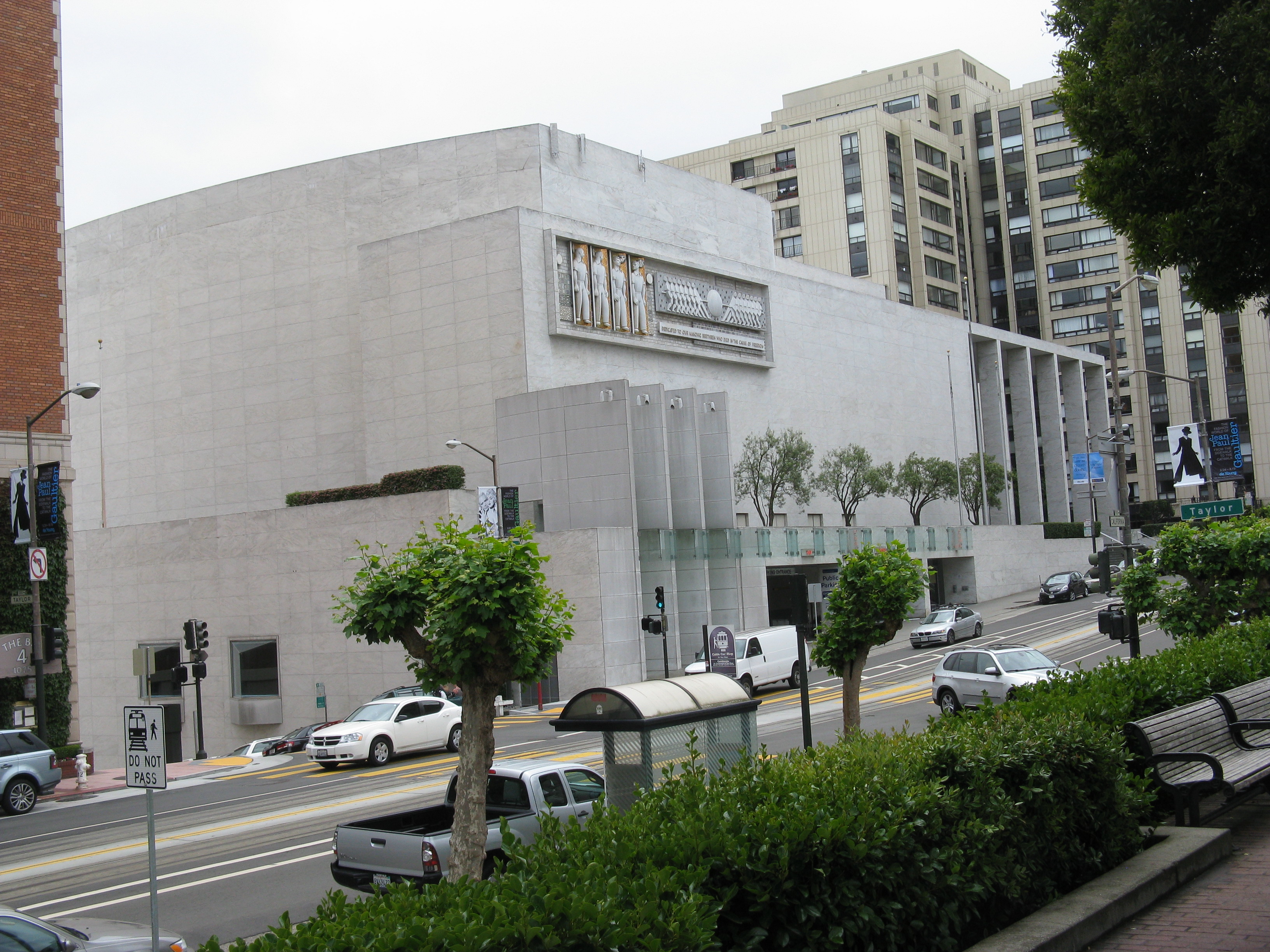
The Nob Hill Masonic Center in San Francisco, California, mosaic window and exterior stone sculptures by Norman

His body of work includes sculptures, mosaics, panels, and jewelry — notably the 40-by-46-foot mosaic window for the Nob Hill Masonic Center in San Francisco, depicting the founding of California Freemasonry. The Monterey Herald described the mural as an endomosaic, incorporating thousands of bits of metal, parchment, felt, linen, silk, natural foliage, thinly sliced vegetable matter, shells and sea life, plus 180 colors of stained glass."

== Documentary ==
In 2006, PBS aired the documentary, Emile Norman: By His Own Design, covering much of Norman's life. The documentary was produced by Michael Tucker and Jill Eikenberry, actors known for their roles on the NBC television series, L.A. Law. The couple were friends and neighbors of Norman having purchased land from him in Big Sur.

The film incorporated footage shot by Norman's partner Brooks Clement on a hand-cranked 16mm Bolex.
