= Nordman (surname) =

Nordman is a surname. Notable people with the surname include:

- Edward Nordman (1864-1939), American politician and farmer
- Grant Nordman (born 1950), Canadian politician
- Maria Nordman (born 1943), American sculptor
- Ric Nordman (1919–1996), Canadian businessman and politician
