= Arthur Norman (businessman) =

British industrialist

- Born: 18 February 1917
- Died: 30 September 2011 (aged 94)
- Military career
- Allegiance: United Kingdom
- Branch: Royal Air Force
- Conflicts: Second World War

Sir Arthur Gordon Norman CBE DFC (18 February 1917 – 30 September 2011) was a leading British industrialist, President of the CBI and Chairman of the UK Centre for Economic and Environmental Development.

== Biography ==
Arthur Gordon Norman was born on 18 February 1917 at North Petherton.

Arthur Norman was educated at Blundell's School and served with the RAF during WW II, reaching the rank of Wing Commander.

In 1943 Norman was awarded the Distinguished Flying Cross for his actions on 18 September 1943 during Operation 'Elaborate' (the ferrying of Horsa gliders from Portreath to Rabat-Salé in Morocco).

Norman joined De La Rue in 1934 and became managing director in 1953 and chairman from 1964 to 1987. His other appointments included:

- Director and chairman of the World Wildlife Fund
- Director of the British Airways Board
- Chairman of Sun Life Insurance
- Director of S.K.F. (UK) Ltd
- Chairman of Tilling Group
- Trustee and chairperson of the King Mahendra Trust for Nature Conservation, Europe Chapter

Arthur Norman was knighted in 1969.

== Personal life ==
Norman had two daughters and three sons, one of whom is the novelist Roger Norman.
