= SF Masonic Auditorium =

Building and auditorium located atop Nob Hill in San Francisco, California, USA

Coordinates: 37.79132°N 122.41306°W

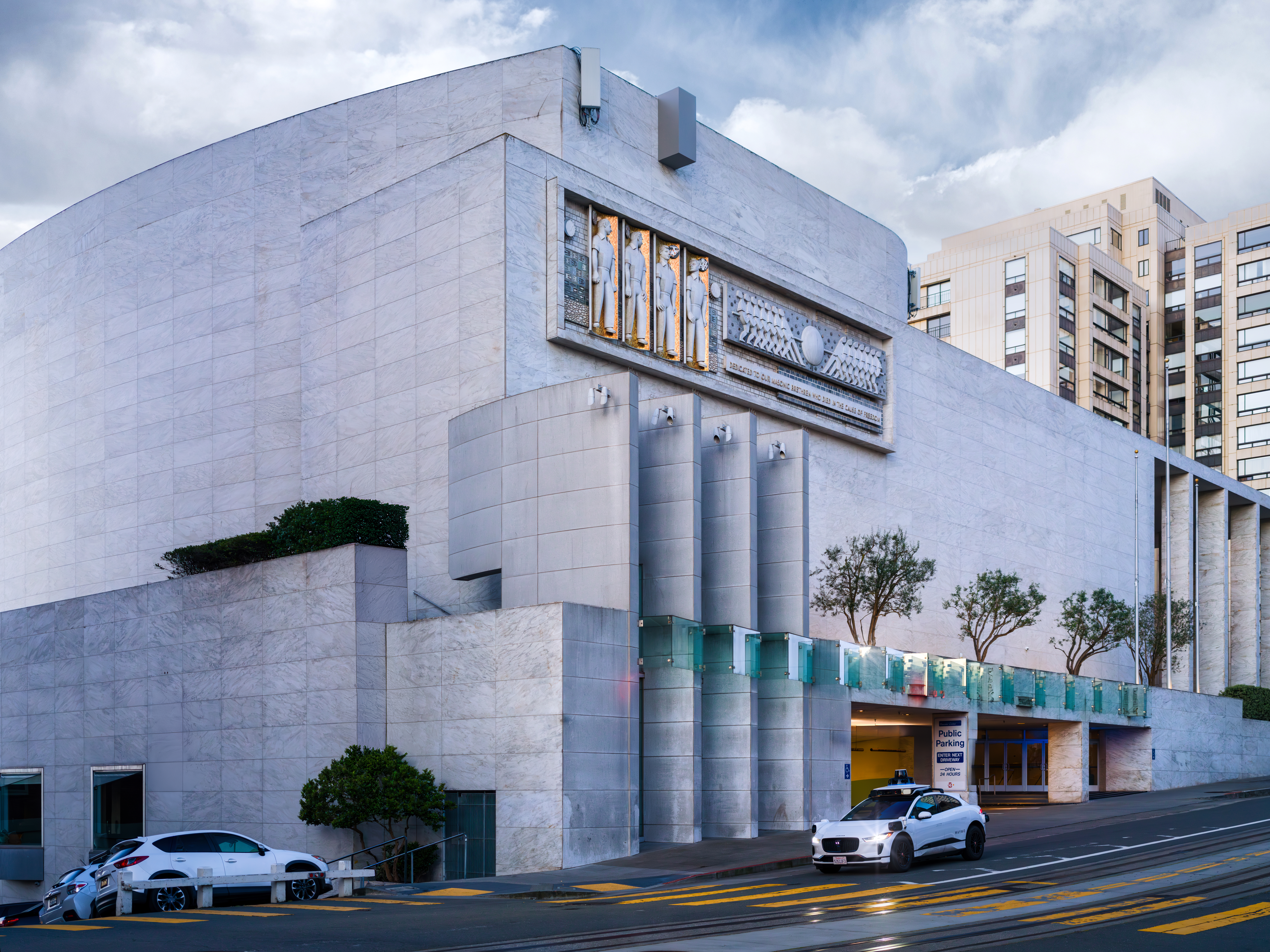
- Interactive map of SF Masonic Auditorium
- Former names: Grand Masonic Auditorium (1958-95); Nob Hill Masonic Auditorium (1995-2014)
- Address: 1111 California St; San Francisco, CA 94108-2252
- Owner: Masons of California
- Operator: Live Nation
- Capacity: 3,481

Construction
- Groundbreaking: October 25, 1955
- Opened: September 28, 1958
- Renovated: 1975, 2005, 2010, 2014
- Cost: $6 million ($72.1 million in 2025 dollars)
- Architect: Albert Roller

Website
- Venue Website

The SF Masonic Auditorium (originally the Grand Masonic Auditorium and formerly known as the Nob Hill Masonic Auditorium) is a building and auditorium located atop Nob Hill in San Francisco, California. The building was designed by Bay Area architect Albert Roller (1891-1981), and opened in 1958. It serves as the meeting venue for the Masons of California during their Annual Communication, as well as being used as a concert venue the rest of the year (operated by Live Nation). The administrative offices of the Grand Lodge of California are contained in the upper floors, and the Henry Wilson Coil Library and Museum of Freemasonry is located on the mezzanine. The basement contains a five-level public parking garage.

== History ==
Freemasonry came to California just prior to the Gold Rush of 1849. By 1850, a Grand Lodge was constituted in Sacramento, to oversee the Lodges operating throughout the State at that time (primarily in port towns along the Sacramento Delta and gold mining towns in the Sierra foothills). Construction began in 1861 for a new Grand Lodge building in San Francisco at the corner of Post and Montgomery Streets. It was completed in 1863 and destroyed in the 1906 San Francisco earthquake. The architectural firm of Bliss & Faville designed a new building for the Grand Lodge of California at 25 Van Ness Avenue which was completed in 1913 and occupied by them until 1958 when it relocated to the new building at 1111 California Street. The 25 Van Ness building is currently used by the Rent Board of San Francisco, but evidence of its Masonic history survives in the façade, lobby and other areas that bear Masonic motifs.

== Features ==
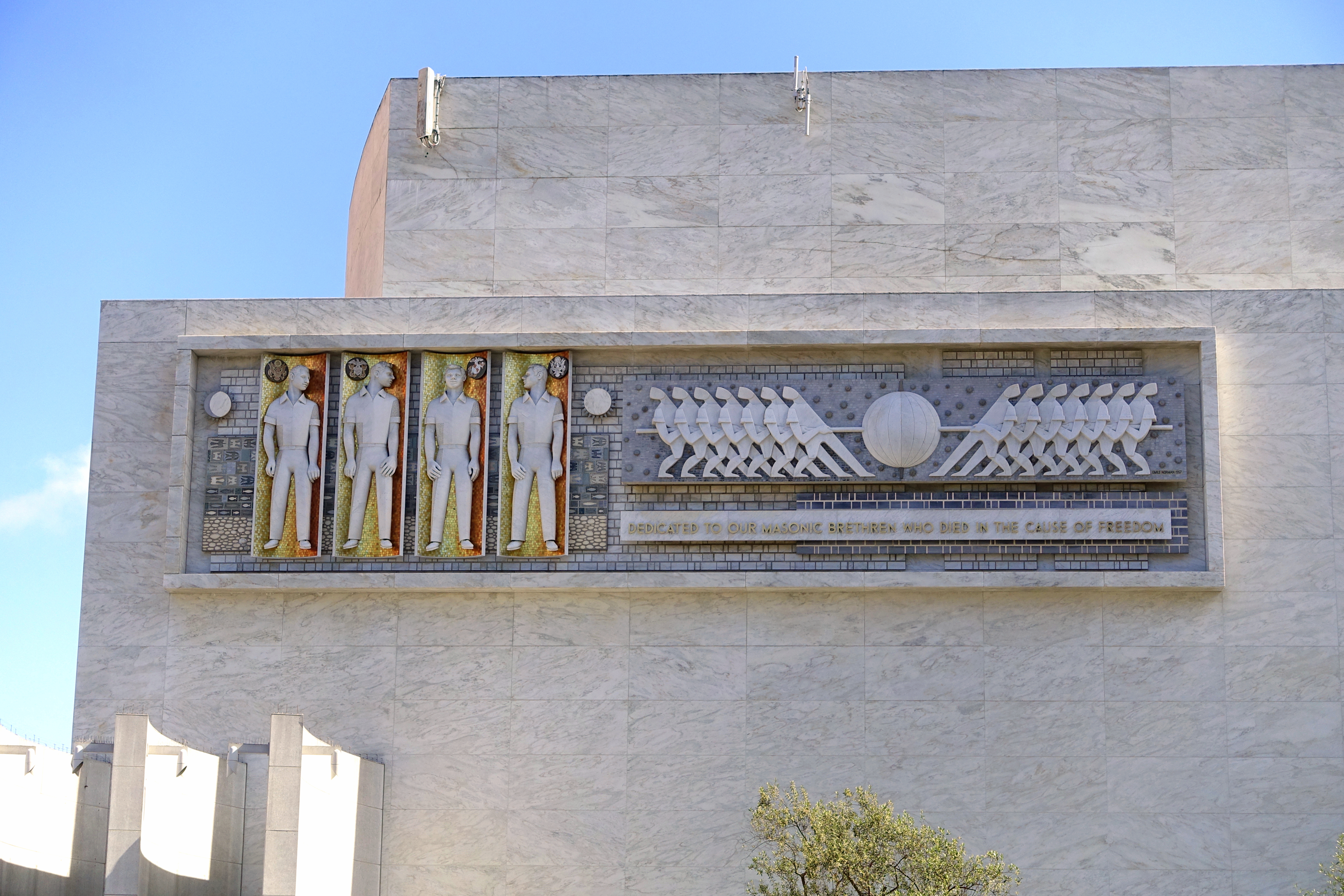
Exterior frieze on California Street

On the main (north) façade, there is a large frieze by Emile Norman bearing the inscription "Dedicated to our Masonic Brethren who died in the cause of freedom", depicting stylized servicemen from each of the four branches of the Armed Services, and a global tug of war representing global struggles. Inside the lobby is a huge mosaic window likewise designed by Emile Norman. The window depicts a variety of natural and Masonic themes. It contains gravel and soil from each of the 58 counties in California.

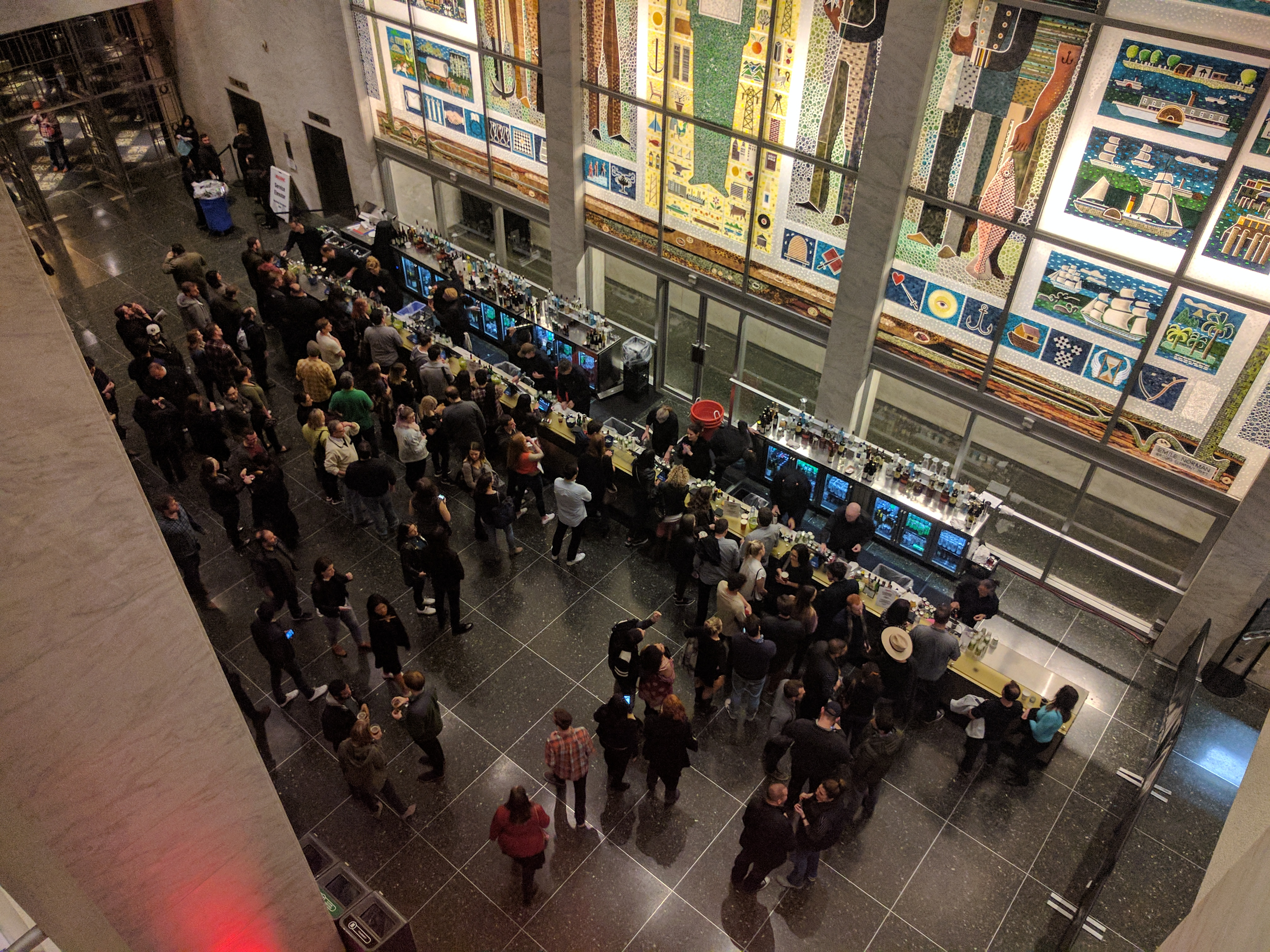
The lower part of the mosaic by Emile Norman

== See also ==
- List of Masonic buildings in the United States
- House Of Blues
