= George William Norman =

American lawyer and politician

George William Norman (December 18, 1827 – April 7, 1918) was a lawyer, public official, and state legislator in Arkansas in the Arkansas State Senate. He had a law practice in Hamburg, Arkansas for decades.

He was born in Bibb County, Georgia. He lived in Union County, Arkansas before moving to in Hamburg, Arkansas. A Democrat, he testified about the 1872 election.

He married twice. He wrote a letter to Harpers about German-Americans and described them as the most servile of Europeans.

He was a delegate to the 1868 Arkansas Constitutional Convention. He was a director of the Mississippi River, Hamburg, and Western Railway.

He had a son George and another who become Dr. W. S. Norman.

He amended a law so women would be able to take part in temperance petitions.
