= John Charles Norman =

American graphic designer and advertising executive (born 1966)

- Born: May 5, 1966 (age 60); Terrell, Texas, U.S.
- Occupations: Graphic designer; advertising executive
- Awards: Epica Award
- Website: www.johnnorman.com

John Charles Norman (born May 5, 1966 Terrell, Texas) is an American graphic designer and advertising executive, and was formerly the Chief Creative Officer of Havas in Chicago. He is best known for his work on the NFL, the NBA, State Farm, the Hewlett Packard +HP campaign, the Coca-Cola Happiness Factory and Open Happiness campaigns, and for numerous campaigns for Nike.

Norman spent nine years working in Europe, and was called a "visual storyteller" by The Wall Street Journal after creating campaigns for Nike and Coca-Cola that required no dialogue and could be run in a multitude of countries. His work has received an Emmy nomination, numerous Cannes Lions, an Epica award, D&AD awards, and One Show awards.
