= Albert Norman =

Albert Norman MBE (1882–1964) was one of the founders and the first secretary of the Institute of Biomedical Science.

Norman was born in 1882 in the parish of St Giles in Cambridge, England.

He and coworkers founded the Pathology and Laboratory Assistants Association now the Institute of Biomedical Science www.ibms.org in UK. In 1891 at aged 8 Albert Norman lived at 25 Madingley Road Cambridge with his father whose occupation was gardener, his mother and his paternal grandfather who was a retired farm labourer. By the age of 14 (1896) Albert Norman was working in the zoological department at Cambridge University where he gained experience in histological procedures and taxidermy and he eventually moved into the newly formed pathology laboratory. When he was about 17 he moved to the Norfolk and Norwich hospital as the sole laboratory worker, where he added the skills of museum specimen preparation, the newly discovered radiography and pharmacy. In the 1901 Albert was 19 year old young boarder in the household of an Anthony Bailey a grocer's assistant at 44 Grapes Hill Norwich. Albert's occupation is shown as a 'curator's assistant'.
