= Maidie Norman =

American actress

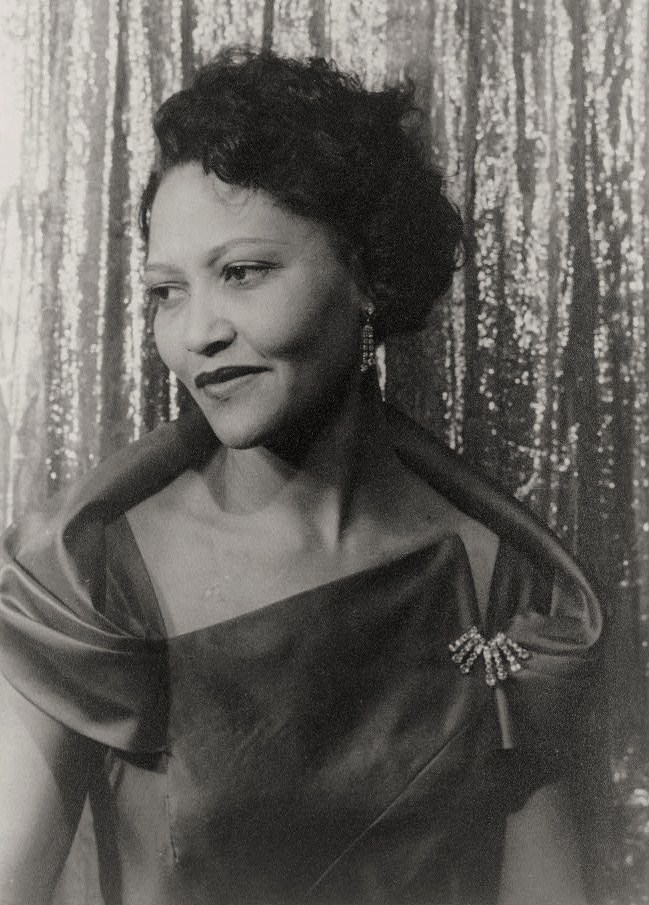
- Maidie Norman photographed by Carl Van Vechten, 1951
- Born: Maidie Ruth Gamble; October 16, 1912; Villa Rica, Georgia, U.S.
- Died: May 2, 1998 (aged 85); San Jose, California, U.S.
- Resting place: Cremated
- Other name: Madie Norman
- Education: Bennett College; Columbia University
- Occupation: Actress
- Years active: 1917–1988
- Spouses: McHenry Norman (m.1937–197?; his death); Weldon D. Canada (m. 1977–1998)
- Children: 1

Maidie Ruth Norman (née Gamble; October 16, 1912 – May 2, 1998) was an American radio, stage, film, and television actress as well as an instructor in African-American literature and theater.

== Early life ==
Norman was born Maidie Ruth Gamble on a plantation in Villa Rica, Georgia, to Louis and Lila Graham Gamble. She was raised in Lima, Ohio, and began studying drama and performing in Shakespeare plays as a child. She graduated from Central High School in Lima in 1930, and attended Bennett College in Greensboro, North Carolina, where she earned a Bachelor of Arts in 1934. She then got her master's degree in drama at Columbia University in 1937.

She married real-estate broker McHenry Norman on December 22, 1937. She later used her husband's surname as her professional name.

== Career ==
=== Acting ===
Norman began her career in radio with appearances on The Jack Benny Program and Amos 'n' Andy. In 1946, she began studying at the Actors' Laboratory Theatre in Hollywood. She made her stage debut in 1949 as Honey in Deep Are the Roots at the Mayan Theater in Los Angeles.

In 1947, Norman made her film debut in The Peanut Man. She initially found it difficult to find positive roles in films for African-American women and felt limited in playing maids and domestics. While she did appear in such roles, Norman refused to portray these characters in a subservient or stereotypical manner that was considered the norm. She later said "In the beginning, I made a pledge that I would play no role that deprived black women of their dignity."

Norman appeared in her only leading role in 1951, playing Martha Crawford in The Well. She later appeared in supporting roles in Torch Song (1953), Bright Road (1953), Susan Slept Here (1954), The Opposite Sex (1956), and Written on the Wind (1956). One of her more memorable roles was as the ill-fated housekeeper Elvira Stitt in Robert Aldrich's 1962 horror film What Ever Happened to Baby Jane?, with Bette Davis and Joan Crawford. In a 1995 interview, Norman recalled that the character was originally written as a "doltish, yessum character". She rewrote the dialogue, which she called "old slavery-time talk", in an effort to dignify the character.

During the 1960s and for the remainder of her career, Norman appeared mainly in television roles because she believed more opportunities existed for African-American performers in the medium. Her TV credits include appearances in The Loretta Young Show, Perry Mason, Alfred Hitchcock Presents, Ben Casey, Dragnet and Dr. Kildare. In 1961, she appeared in the Los Angeles production of A Raisin in the Sun.

In the 1970s and 1980s, Norman guest-starred on episodes of Good Times, The Jeffersons, Little House on the Prairie, and The Streets of San Francisco. Her last film role was in Terrorist on Trial: The United States vs. Salim Ajami (1988), and the same year, she made her television appearances in the American sitcom Amen, the TV movie Side by Side, and an episode of Simon & Simon.

=== Teaching ===
At the height of her career during the 1950s, Norman toured colleges lecturing on African-American literature and theater. From 1955 to 1956, she taught at the University of Texas at Tyler. Norman was also an artist-in-residence at Stanford University from 1968 to 1969. In 1970, she created and taught a course in African-American theater history at UCLA. It was the first course devoted to the subject of African-American studies in the college's history. Norman taught at UCLA until 1977. In her honor, UCLA established the Maidie Norman Research Award for the best student essay on African-American film or theater.

== Personal life ==
On December 22, 1937, she married real estate broker McHenry Norman, whom she met while attending Bennett College. They had one son, McHenry Norman III. They were married until McHenry's death. In 1977, Norman married Weldon D. Canada, to whom she remained married until her death.

== Death ==
Norman died of lung cancer on May 2, 1998, at her son's home in San Jose, California, aged 85. Her funeral was held at the Alum Rock United Methodist Church in San Jose on May 12. She was cremated per The Neptune Society of Central California and her ashes scattered at sea.

== Honors ==
Norman was invited to serve as an official delegate of the Methodist Church for a conference on human relations held February 11–13, 1958 at the First Methodist Church of Glendale and sponsored by the Southern California-Arizona Conference Board of Christian Social Relations and the General Board of Social and Economic Relations.

In 1977, she was inducted into the Black Filmmakers Hall of Fame.

In 1985, California Educational Theatre Association gave her a professional artist award.

In 1992, Norman was awarded an honorary doctorate from Bennett College, her alma mater.

== Filmography ==
Year	Title	Role	Notes
1947	The Burning Cross	Kitty West	
1947	The Peanut Man		
1949	Manhandled	Christine (Bennet's maid)	Uncredited
1951	The Well	Martha Crawford	
1952	Lydia Bailey	Minor role	Uncredited
1953	Bright Road	Mrs. Hamilton (Tanya's mother)	
1953	Torch Song	Anne	
1953	Forever Female	Emma (Beatrice's maid)	Uncredited
1953	Money from Home	Mattie (Phyllis' maid)	Uncredited
1954	Executive Suite	Housekeeper	Uncredited
1954	About Mrs. Leslie	Camilla	
1954	Susan Slept Here	Georgette (Mark's maid)	
1955	Tarzan's Hidden Jungle	Suma	Uncredited
1955	Mad at the World	Miss Lovett	Uncredited
1955	Man with the Gun	Sarah (Nelly's maid)	Uncredited
1956	The Opposite Sex	Violet (clerk at Sydney's)	Uncredited
1956	Written on the Wind	Bertha	
1960	No Greater Love		
1962	What Ever Happened to Baby Jane?	Elvira Stitt	
1963	4 for Texas	Burden's maid	
1966	A Fine Madness	Waitress	Uncredited
1972	The Final Comedown	Nurse Ferguson	Alternative title: Blast!
1973	Maurie	Mrs. Stokes	
1973	Sixteen	Aunt Ada	Alternative title: The Young Prey
1976	A Star Is Born	Justice of the Peace	Uncredited
1977	Airport '77	Dorothy	
1978	Movie Movie	Gussie	
1982	Halloween III: Season of the Witch	Nurse Agnes	

== Television credits ==
Year	Title	Role	Notes
1950	Fireside Theatre		Season 3 Episode 9: "The Amber Gods"
1954	Fireside Theatre		Season 7 Episode 4: "Afraid to Live"
1955	Hallmark Hall of Fame	Lurie	Episode: "The Courtship of George Washington and Martha Custiss"
1955	Lux Video Theatre	Flora	Season 5 Episode 34: "No Sad Songs for Me"
1955	Lux Video Theatre	Maid	Season 5 Episode 44: "Forever Female"
1955	Cavalcade of America	Aunt Nellie	Season 4 Episode 3: "Towards Tomorrow"
1956	Matinee Theater	Rose	Season 1 Episode 111: "From the Desk of Margaret Tyding"
1956	Four Star Playhouse	Coralee	Season 4 Episode 26: "Autumn Carousel"
1956	Climax!	Maggie	Season 2 Episode 27: "The Lou Gehrig Story"
1956	Celebrity Playhouse	Elsie	Season 1 Episode 35: "I'll Make the Arrest"
1956	Dragnet		Season 6 Episode 2: "The Big Missus"
1957	Letter to Loretta	Flora	Season 4 Episode 33: "Royal Partners, Part 1"
1957	Letter to Loretta	Flora	Season 4 Episode 34: "Royal Partners, Part 2"
1959	Letter to Loretta	Josi	Season 7 Episode 4: "Mask of Evidence"
1960	Alfred Hitchcock Presents	Eloise	Season 6 Episode 1: "Mrs. Bixby and the Colonel's Coat"
1960	Michael Shayne	Maid	Season 1 Episode 9: "Blood on Biscayne Bay"
1962	Perry Mason	Maid	Season 5 Episode 21: "The Case of the Mystified Miner"
1963	Wide Country	Vera	Season 1 Episode 18: "Speckle Bird"
1963	Ben Casey	Bartender	Season 3 Episode 4: "Allie"
1963	The Joey Bishop Show	Nurse Mildred	Season 3 Episode 12: "Ellie Gives Joey First Aid"
1963	Breaking Point	Guard Apples	Season 1 Episode 15: "Don't Cry, Baby, Don't Cry"
1964	The Twilight Zone	Maid	Season 5 Episode 25: "The Masks" (uncredited)
1964	Hazel	Lady	Season 3 Episode 30: "Campaign Manager"
1965	Dr. Kildare	Mrs. Johnson	Season 4 Episode 20: "A Marriage of Convenience"
1965	Death Valley Days	Martha	Season 14 Episode 7: "No Place for a Lady"
1965	The Long, Hot Summer	Miss James	Season 1 Episode 6: "Home Is a Nameless Place"
1965	The Man from U.N.C.L.E.	Mama Lou	Season 2 Episode 15: "The Very Important Zombie Affair"
1967	CBS Playhouse	Mrs. Pierce	Season 1 Episode 1: "The Final War of Olly Winter"
1967	Ironside	Natalie Masterson	Season 1 Episode 8: "Let My Brother Go"
1967	Dragnet	Mrs. Holmes	Season 2 Episode 11: "The Big Dog"
1968	Dragnet	Elsa Erickson	Season 2 Episode 28: "The Big Problem"
1968	Insight	Alice Pearl	Season 1 Episode 200: "The Sandalmaker"
1968	Daktari	Mwanda	Season 4 Episode 6: "Adam and Jenny"
1968	Judd, for the Defense	Charlene Muller	Season 2 Episode 8: "The Gates of Cerberus"
1969	The Outcasts	Esther	Season 1 Episode 24: "Give Me Tomorrow"
1970	Ironside	Shaw's Mother	Season 3 Episode 16: "Eden Is the Place We Leave"
1970	Storefront Lawyers aka Men at Law	Mrs. Kingman	Season 1 Episode 7: "Easy to Be Hard"
1970	Barefoot in the Park	Lady	Season 1 Episode 6: "The Marriage Proposal"
1970	The F.B.I.	Caregiver	Season 6 Episode 7: "The Innocents"
1970	Another Part of the Forest	Coralee	Television film
1970	Mannix	Aunt Frances	Season 4 Episode 8: "The World Between"
1971	Mannix	Helen Frank	Season 5 Episode 8: "The Glass Trap"
1971	Mannix	Mrs. Frost	Season 5 Episode 9: "A Choice of Evils"
1971	Room 222	Mrs. Beemer	Season 3 Episode 10: "Dixon's Raiders"
1971	Marcus Welby, M.D.	Cleaning Woman	Season 3 Episode 14: "Of Magic Shadow Shapes"
1972	Say Goodbye, Maggie Cole	Nurse Ferguson	Television film
1972	Adam-12	Mary Handlin	Season 4 Episode 18: "The Adoption"
1973	Adam-12	Ethel May	Season 6 Episode 9: "Capture"
1973	Griff	Fat Mama Jean	Season 1 Episode 10: "Hammerlock"
1973	A Dream for Christmas	Jennie Daley	Television film
1973	Love Story	Mother	Season 1 Episode 11: "A Glow of Dying Embers"
1974	Marcus Welby, M.D.	Willie	Season 5 Episode 17: "Each Day a Miracle"
1974	Cannon	Mama Sally	Season 3 Episode 23: "Triangle of Terror"
1974	The Sty of the Blind Pig	Weedy Warren	Television film
1974	The Streets of San Francisco	Mrs. Anderson	Season 3 Episode 7: "Jacob's Boy"
1974	Rhoda	Nurse Charlotte	Season 1 Episode 12: "I'm a Little Late, Folks"
1975	Kolchak: The Night Stalker	Librarian	Season 1 Episode 12: "Mr. R.I.N.G."
1975	Lucas Tanner	Ellen Russell	Season 1 Episode 14: "Those Who Cannot, Teach"
1975	Kung Fu	Omar's Mother	Season 3 Episode 18: "Barbary House"
1975	Good Times	Edna	Season 2 Episode 22: "The Enlistment"
1975	Harry O	Clara Wooster	Season 2 Episode 4: "Shades"
1975	The Jeffersons	Rachel	Season 2 Episode 5: "Mother Jefferson's Fall"
1975	Police Woman	Nurse	Season 2 Episode 13: "The Hit"
1976	Police Woman	Celia Jackson	Season 3 Episode 1: "The Trick Book"
1976	Marcus Welby, M.D.	Mrs. Clements	Season 7 Episode 19: "The Highest Mountain"
1976	Police Story	Mrs. Wilkins	Season 3 Episode 17: "50 Cents-First Half Hour, $1.75 All Day"
1976	Bronk	Stella	Season 1 Episode 23: "Death with Honor"
1976	Baretta	Mrs. Rich	Season 3 Episode 11: "Can't Win for Losin'"
1977	Police Woman	Mrs. Pole	Season 4 Episode 5: "Screams"
1977	Little House on the Prairie	Mrs. Henry	Season 3 Episode 18: "The Wisdom of Solomon"
1979	The Incredible Hulk	Mrs. Dennison	Season 2 Episode 13: "Like a Brother"
1979	Roots: The Next Generations	Sister Scrap Scott	Miniseries
1979	Barnaby Jones	Rose	Season 8 Episode 6: "Girl on the Road"
1981	Thornwell	Ruth Thornwell	Television film
1981	Enos		Season 1 Episode 13: "Once and Fur All"
1982	Bare Essence		Television film
1982	Cagney & Lacey	Elevator Operator	Season 2 Episode 6: "Internal Affairs"
1983	Bare Essence		Season 1 Episode 4: "Hour Four"
1983	Secrets of a Mother and Daughter	Neddy	Television film
1983	Hotel	Carrie Garland	Season 1 Episode 7: "Confrontations"
1984	His Mistress	Law School Registrar	Television film
1985	Matt Houston	Ethel	Season 3 Episode 21: "Death Watch"
1988	Terrorist on Trial: The United States vs. Salim Ajami	Edna	Television film
1988	Amen	Mrs. Murray	Season 2 Episode 13: "Man on a Ledge"
1988	Side by Side	Eunice	Television film
1988	Simon & Simon	Bessie Copeland	Season 7 Episode 13: "Little Boy Dead"
