= Roger Norman (novelist) =

British novelist living in Turkey (born 1948)

Roger Norman (born 1948) is a British novelist living in Turkey. He is the author of four widely acclaimed novels for adults and children, mainly centering on the countryside of Dorset in southwest England.

== Biography ==
Norman was born in 1948, the third child of Sir Arthur Norman, a leading British industrialist and former president of the Confederation of British Industry and Chairman of the UK Centre for Economic and Environmental Development. Norman was educated at Sherborne School and Cambridge University. In the course of his life, Norman has lived and worked in Greece as an olive farmer, been features Editor of the English-language Turkish Daily News in Ankara, taught in several universities, and served as a consultant on missions for several United Nations agencies examining agriculture and economic development. He currently works full-time as a writer and lives in Eskişehir in the region of Turkey known in Classical times as Phrygia.

Norman's fiction continues the English tradition begun by John Masefield and John Cowper Powys, in which an undercurrent of supernatural fantasy or even mildly occult events interacts with characters in a modern British setting. Albion’s Dream, first published in 1990, tells the story of a 12-year-old schoolboy and his cousin who find a home-made boardgame in a farmhouse cupboard. They begin to play the game and quickly find that it unlocks mysterious forces and situations which they find it increasingly difficult to master. Tree-Time, 1997, is a fantasy novel for younger children about a night that happens once every century when trees come to life and walk around while the world sleeps. Red Die, (2008) recounts the last weeks in the life of a World War I army deserter, Jack Yeoman, in October 1916 as he travels across the Dorset countryside guided by a set of red dice, pursued by his enemies. The story builds up to a shattering tragic climax on the eve of All Saints' Day, at Dorset's famous prehistoric monument Giant Hill at Cerne Abbas. In addition to his fiction writings, Norman also contributes articles to newspapers and magazines.

His fourth novel, Shadowborne, was published by The Sundial Press on 22 October 2012.

== Published works ==
- Albion's Dream (Faber and Faber, 1990)
- Tree Time (Faber and Faber, 1997)
- Red Die (The Sundial Press, 2008)
- Shadowborne (The Sundial Press, 2012)
