= Willie Anne Wright =

American photographer (born 1924)

- Born: Willie Anna Boschen; 1924 (age 101–102); Richmond, Virginia, U.S.
- Education: College of William & Mary; Virginia Commonwealth University
- Occupation: Photographer
- Known for: Pinhole photography
- Spouse: John Wright Jr.
- Children: 3
- Website: willieannewright.com

Willie Anne Wright (née Boschen; born 1924) is an American photographer best known for her colorful cibachrome and grayscale pinhole photography.

== Biography ==
Willie Anne Wright was born Willie Anna Boschen, in Richmond, Virginia. Her father was a musician and sometime-artist.

She graduated from the College of William & Mary in 1945 with a BS degree in Psychology, and from Virginia Commonwealth University in 1964 with an MFA in Painting. Wright notes that William & Mary fine arts professor Thomas Thorne was particularly influential to her as an undergraduate, both by providing access to art supplies during wartime and by selecting two of her watercolors to be exhibited at the Virginia Museum of Fine Arts in a 1944 exhibition. She later studied at the Maine photographic workshops in Rockport, Maine and the Visual Studies Workshop in Rochester, New York.

She married John "Jack" Wright Jr. and had three children.

== Career ==
Wright began her artistic career as a painter, teaching art classes at the Jewish Community Center, and was influenced by one of her painting instructors, Theresa Pollak. For a while, she experimented with printmaking. By 1973, she began to focus more and more on photography. Inspired by her surroundings and personal life, her first works incorporated images of her family, friends, and Civil War reenactors. Well known for her use of the old technique of pinhole, she is also an exceptional master in lensless photography, solar printing, and photograms.

Some of her better known works include her "Civil War Redux" series, which focuses on local Civil War reenactors whom she followed around for several years, her "Pregnant Women" series, which features pregnant friends of hers, and "The Swimmer" series, which features women lounging by pool-sides or in pools. In 2023, the Virginia Museum of Fine Arts exhibited a retrospective of her work entitled Willie Anne Wright: Artist and Alchemist.

== Technique ==
Wright first experimented with pinhole photography in 1985. For a class project, she had to create and use a pinhole camera. She used Cibachrome paper for use in a 16-by-20-inch pinhole camera. With color-correcting filters she created wide-angle color prints by placing the pinhole close to the film plane. Her images were whimsical, with bright colors and a vignette border.

== Collections ==
Wright's work is held in the following public collections:

- Virginia Museum of Fine Arts.
- Chrysler Museum of Art.
- Muscarelle Museum of Art at William & Mary
- Mary Baldwin University
- Walter Cecil Rawls Library and Museum, Courtland, VA
- Mariners' Museum.
- Southeast Museum of Photography
- Smithsonian American Art Museum
- New Orleans Museum of Art.
- Longwood University.
- University of Maine.
- University of New Hampshire.
