= Jimmy Norman (Galway Bay FM) =

Irish radio presenter

Jimmy Norman (born 1969 or 1970) is a radio presenter on Galway Bay FM in Galway, Ireland.

== Early life and education ==
Norman grew up in Galway. He worked at pirate radio stations while still in school, and after finishing his Leaving Certificate in the late 1980s, at Zhivago Music store.

He graduated from Galway Business School in 2012 with a First Class Honours degree in Business Management, and later earned a master's degree in Strategic Management and Innovation.

== Career ==
In 1990 he started work at Radio West, a precursor to Galway Bay FM, where he almost immediately became presenter of the breakfast show; at 20, he was then the youngest full-time radio presenter in Ireland. He continued working at the station primarily as presenter of the breakfast show until February 2012, when he requested a move to afternoon radio. He returned to the Breakfast Show in April 2013.

In 2006 he was the first face on City Channel Galway, where he produced and presented a current affairs programme called Galway in Focus. The programme continued until City Channel closed its Galway operation in 2009.

In the 1990s, with his then partner, Catherine Tiernan, Norman started Eire Communications, a telecommunications company which was sold in 2002. He and his wife have subsequently run Norman Media, and together hosted Galway County Matters for Irish TV from February 2015. In the 2010s he also worked as a voice-over artist and DJ.

== Personal life ==
Norman is married to Sinéad Ní Neachtain and has four children.
