= George Norman (naturalist) =

George Norman (1823–1882) was a naturalist from Hull, England.

He was involved with William Hendry in founding the 'Micro-Philosophical Society' — "a curious title, subsequently changed to the Hull Natural History and Microscopic Society. George Norman, William Hendry, and a few others met bi-monthly in the Hull Royal Institution.
