= Golden Globe Award for Best Screenplay =

Award

Golden Globe for Best Screenplay – Motion Picture
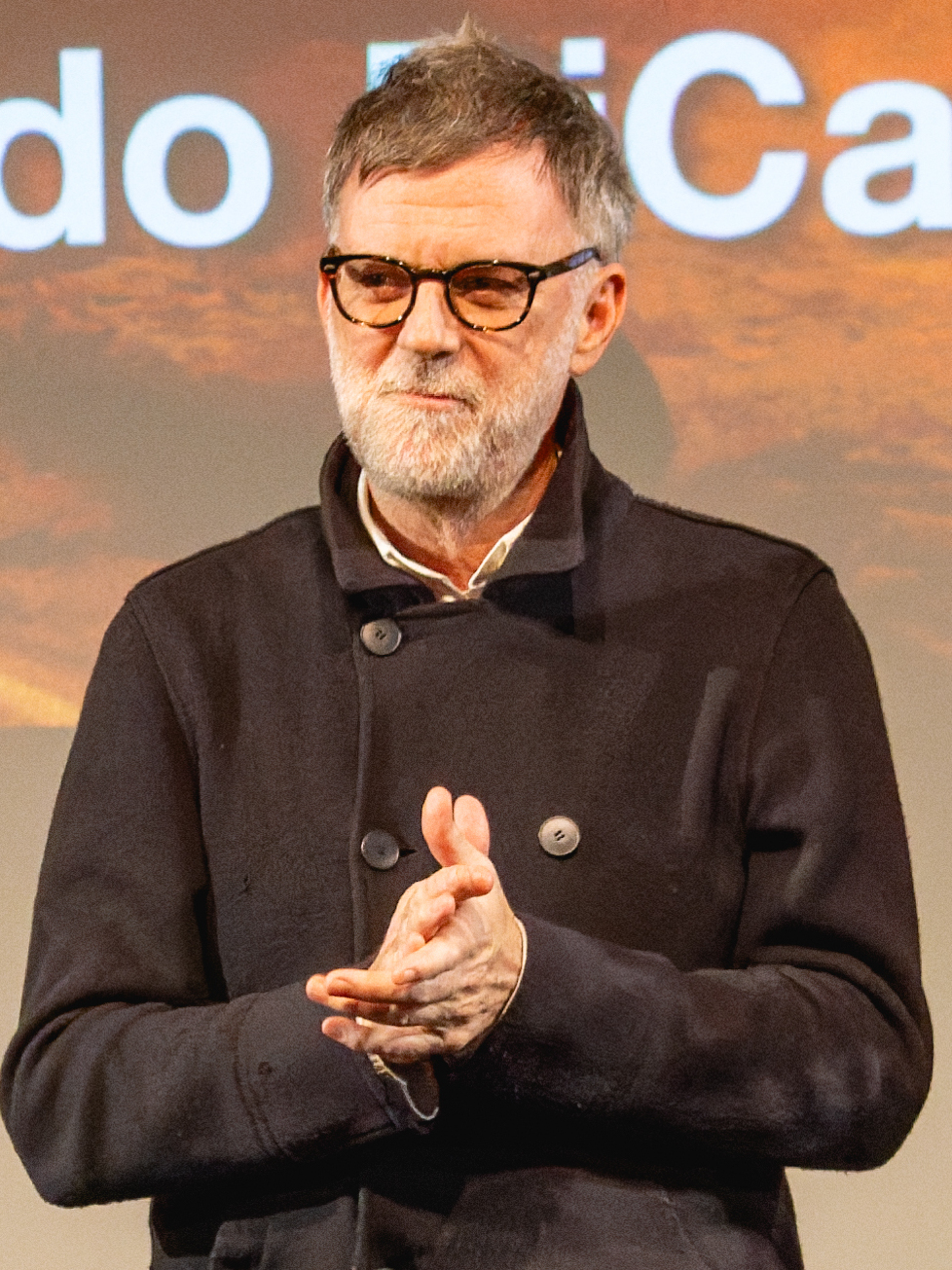
- The 2025 recipient: Paul Thomas Anderson
- Awarded for: Best Screenplay Writing (Original or Adapted) of a Motion Picture
- Location: United States
- Presented by: Dick Clark Productions
- Currently held by: Paul Thomas Anderson for One Battle After Another (2025)
- Website: goldenglobes.com

The Golden Globe Award for Best Screenplay – Motion Picture is a Golden Globe Award first given by the Hollywood Foreign Press Association, now awarded by Dick Clark Productions since 2023.

== Winners and nominees ==
† marks the winner of the Academy Award for Best Adapted Screenplay and Best Motion Picture Story

‡ marks the winner of the Academy Award for Best Original Screenplay

=== 1940s ===
Year	Film	Nominees
1947	Miracle on 34th Street	George Seaton †
1948	The Search †	Richard Schweizer
1949	Battleground ‡	Robert Pirosh
1949	Rope of Sand	Walter Doniger

=== 1950s ===
Year	Film	Nominees
1950	All About Eve †	Joseph L. Mankiewicz
1950	The Asphalt Jungle	Ben Maddow and John Huston
1950	Sunset Boulevard ‡	Charles Brackett, Billy Wilder, and D. M. Marshman Jr.
1951	Bright Victory	Robert Buckner
1952	5 Fingers	Michael Wilson
1952	High Noon	Carl Foreman
1952	The Thief	Clarence Greene and Russell Rouse
1953	Lili	Helen Deutsch
1954	Sabrina	Billy Wilder, Ernest Lehman, and Samuel A. Taylor

=== 1960s ===
Year	Film	Nominees
1965	Doctor Zhivago †	Robert Bolt
1965	The Agony and the Ecstasy	Philip Dunne
1965	The Collector	John Kohn and Stanley Mann
1965	A Patch of Blue	Guy Green
1965	The Slender Thread	Stirling Silliphant
1966	A Man for All Seasons †	Robert Bolt
1966	Alfie	Bill Naughton
1966	The Russians Are Coming, the Russians Are Coming	William Rose
1966	The Sand Pebbles	Robert Anderson
1966	Who's Afraid of Virginia Woolf?	Ernest Lehman
1967	In the Heat of the Night †	Stirling Silliphant
1967	Bonnie and Clyde	Robert Benton and David Newman
1967	The Fox	Lewis John Carlino and Howard Koch
1967	The Graduate	Buck Henry and Calder Willingham
1967	Guess Who's Coming to Dinner ‡	William Rose
1968	CHAЯLY	Stirling Silliphant
1968	The Fixer	Dalton Trumbo
1968	The Lion in Winter †	James Goldman
1968	The Producers ‡	Mel Brooks
1968	Rosemary's Baby	Roman Polanski
1969	Anne of the Thousand Days	Bridget Boland, John Hale, and Richard Sokolove
1969	Butch Cassidy and the Sundance Kid ‡	William Goldman
1969	If It's Tuesday, This Must Be Belgium	David Shaw
1969	John and Mary	John Mortimer
1969	Midnight Cowboy †	Waldo Salt

=== 1970s ===
Year	Film	Nominees
1970	Love Story	Erich Segal
1970	Five Easy Pieces	Carole Eastman and Bob Rafelson
1970	Husbands	John Cassavetes
1970	M*A*S*H †	Ring Lardner Jr.
1970	Scrooge	Leslie Bricusse
1971	The Hospital ‡	Paddy Chayefsky
1971	The French Connection †	Ernest Tidyman
1971	Klute	Andy and Dave Lewis
1971	Kotch	John Paxton
1971	Mary, Queen of Scots	John Hale
1972	The Godfather †	Francis Ford Coppola and Mario Puzo
1972	Avanti!	Billy Wilder and I. A. L. Diamond
1972	Cabaret	Jay Presson Allen
1972	Deliverance	James Dickey
1972	Frenzy	Anthony Shaffer
1972	The Heartbreak Kid	Neil Simon
1973	The Exorcist †	William Peter Blatty
1973	Cinderella Liberty	Darryl Ponicsan
1973	The Day of the Jackal	Kenneth Ross
1973	The Sting ‡	David S. Ward
1973	A Touch of Class	Melvin Frank and Jack Rose
1974	Chinatown ‡	Robert Towne
1974	The Conversation	Francis Ford Coppola
1974	The Godfather Part II †	Francis Ford Coppola and Mario Puzo
1974	The Towering Inferno	Stirling Silliphant
1974	A Woman Under the Influence	John Cassavetes
1975	One Flew Over the Cuckoo's Nest †	Bo Goldman and Lawrence Hauben
1975	Dog Day Afternoon ‡	Frank Pierson
1975	Jaws	Peter Benchley and Carl Gottlieb
1975	Nashville	Joan Tewkesbury
1975	The Sunshine Boys	Neil Simon
1976	Network ‡	Paddy Chayefsky
1976	All the President's Men †	William Goldman
1976	Marathon Man	William Goldman
1976	Rocky	Sylvester Stallone
1976	Taxi Driver	Paul Schrader
1976	Voyage of the Damned	David Butler and Steve Shagan
1977	The Goodbye Girl	Neil Simon
1977	Annie Hall ‡	Woody Allen and Marshall Brickman
1977	Close Encounters of the Third Kind	Steven Spielberg
1977	Julia †	Alvin Sargent
1977	The Turning Point	Arthur Laurents
1978	Midnight Express †	Oliver Stone
1978	Coming Home ‡	Robert C. Jones and Waldo Salt
1978	The Deer Hunter	Deric Washburn
1978	Foul Play	Colin Higgins
1978	Interiors	Woody Allen
1978	An Unmarried Woman	Paul Mazursky
1979	Kramer vs. Kramer †	Robert Benton
1979	Being There	Jerzy Kosinski
1979	Breaking Away ‡	Steve Tesich
1979	The China Syndrome	James Bridges, T. S. Cook, and Mike Gray
1979	Norma Rae	Harriet Frank, Jr. and Irving Ravetch

=== 1980s ===
Year	Film	Nominees
1980	The Ninth Configuration	William Peter Blatty
1980	The Elephant Man	Eric Bergren and Christopher De Vore
1980	Ordinary People †	Alvin Sargent
1980	Raging Bull	Mardik Martin and Paul Schrader
1980	The Stunt Man	Lawrence B. Marcus
1981	On Golden Pond †	Ernest Thompson
1981	Absence of Malice	Kurt Luedtke
1981	The Four Seasons	Alan Alda
1981	The French Lieutenant's Woman	Harold Pinter
1981	Reds	Warren Beatty and Trevor Griffiths
1982	Gandhi ‡	John Briley
1982	E.T. the Extra-Terrestrial	Melissa Mathison
1982	Missing †	Costa-Gavras and Donald E. Stewart
1982	Tootsie	Larry Gelbart and Murray Schisgal
1982	The Verdict	David Mamet
1983	Terms of Endearment †	James L. Brooks
1983	The Big Chill	Barbara Benedek and Lawrence Kasdan
1983	The Dresser	Ronald Harwood
1983	Educating Rita	Willy Russell
1983	Reuben, Reuben	Julius J. Epstein
1984	Amadeus †	Peter Shaffer
1984	The Killing Fields	Bruce Robinson
1984	A Passage to India	David Lean
1984	Places in the Heart ‡	Robert Benton
1984	A Soldier's Story	Charles Fuller
1985	The Purple Rose of Cairo	Woody Allen
1985	Back to the Future	Robert Zemeckis and Bob Gale
1985	Out of Africa †	Kurt Luedtke
1985	Prizzi's Honor	Richard Condon and Janet Roach
1985	Witness ‡	William Kelley and Earl W. Wallace
1986	The Mission	Robert Bolt
1986	Blue Velvet	David Lynch
1986	Hannah and Her Sisters ‡	Woody Allen
1986	Mona Lisa	Neil Jordan and David Leland
1986	Platoon	Oliver Stone
1987	The Last Emperor †	Bernardo Bertolucci, Mark Peploe, and Enzo Ungari
1987	Broadcast News	James L. Brooks
1987	Hope and Glory	John Boorman
1987	House of Games	David Mamet
1987	Moonstruck ‡	John Patrick Shanley
1988	Running on Empty	Naomi Foner
1988	A Cry in the Dark	Robert Caswell and Fred Schepisi
1988	Mississippi Burning	Chris Gerolmo
1988	Rain Man ‡	Ronald Bass and Barry Morrow
1988	Working Girl	Kevin Wade
1989	Born on the Fourth of July	Oliver Stone and Ron Kovic
1989	Dead Poets Society ‡	Tom Schulman
1989	Do the Right Thing	Spike Lee
1989	Glory	Kevin Jarre
1989	Sex, Lies, and Videotape	Steven Soderbergh
1989	When Harry Met Sally...	Nora Ephron

=== 1990s ===
Year	Film	Nominees
1990	Dances with Wolves †	Michael Blake
1990	Avalon	Barry Levinson
1990	The Godfather Part III	Francis Ford Coppola and Mario Puzo
1990	Goodfellas	Nicholas Pileggi and Martin Scorsese
1990	Reversal of Fortune	Nicholas Kazan
1991	Thelma & Louise ‡	Callie Khouri
1991	Bugsy	James Toback
1991	Grand Canyon	Lawrence Kasdan and Meg Kasdan
1991	JFK	Zachary Sklar and Oliver Stone
1991	The Silence of the Lambs †	Ted Tally
1992	Scent of a Woman	Bo Goldman
1992	A Few Good Men	Aaron Sorkin
1992	Howards End †	Ruth Prawer Jhabvala
1992	The Player	Michael Tolkin
1992	Unforgiven	David Webb Peoples
1993	Schindler's List †	Steven Zaillian
1993	Philadelphia	Ron Nyswaner
1993	The Piano ‡	Jane Campion
1993	The Remains of the Day	Ruth Prawer Jhabvala
1993	Short Cuts	Robert Altman and Frank Barhydt
1994	Pulp Fiction ‡	Quentin Tarantino
1994	Forrest Gump †	Eric Roth
1994	Four Weddings and a Funeral	Richard Curtis
1994	Quiz Show	Paul Attanasio
1994	The Shawshank Redemption	Frank Darabont
1995	Sense and Sensibility †	Emma Thompson
1995	The American President	Aaron Sorkin
1995	Braveheart	Randall Wallace
1995	Dead Man Walking	Tim Robbins
1995	Get Shorty	Scott Frank
1995	Mr. Holland's Opus	Patrick Sheane Duncan
1996	The People vs. Larry Flynt	Scott Alexander and Larry Karaszewski
1996	The English Patient	Anthony Minghella
1996	Fargo ‡	Joel Coen and Ethan Coen
1996	Lone Star	John Sayles
1996	Shine	Jan Sardi
1997	Good Will Hunting ‡	Matt Damon and Ben Affleck
1997	As Good as It Gets	Mark Andrus and James L. Brooks
1997	L.A. Confidential †	Brian Helgeland and Curtis Hanson
1997	Titanic	James Cameron
1997	Wag the Dog	Hilary Henkin and David Mamet
1998	Shakespeare in Love ‡	Marc Norman and Tom Stoppard
1998	Bulworth	Warren Beatty and Jeremy Pikser
1998	Happiness	Todd Solondz
1998	Saving Private Ryan	Robert Rodat
1998	The Truman Show	Andrew Niccol
1999	American Beauty ‡	Alan Ball
1999	Being John Malkovich	Charlie Kaufman
1999	The Cider House Rules †	John Irving
1999	The Insider	Eric Roth and Michael Mann
1999	The Sixth Sense	M. Night Shyamalan

=== 2000s ===
Year	Film	Nominees
2000	Traffic †	Stephen Gaghan
2000	Almost Famous ‡	Cameron Crowe
2000	Quills	Doug Wright
2000	Wonder Boys	Steve Kloves
2000	You Can Count on Me	Kenneth Lonergan
2001	A Beautiful Mind †	Akiva Goldsman
2001	Gosford Park ‡	Julian Fellowes
2001	The Man Who Wasn't There	Joel Coen and Ethan Coen
2001	Memento	Christopher Nolan
2001	Mulholland Drive	David Lynch
2002	About Schmidt	Alexander Payne and Jim Taylor
2002	Adaptation.	Charlie and Donald Kaufman
2002	Chicago	Bill Condon
2002	Far from Heaven	Todd Haynes
2002	The Hours	David Hare
2003	Lost in Translation ‡	Sofia Coppola
2003	Cold Mountain	Anthony Minghella
2003	In America	Jim Sheridan, Kirsten Sheridan, and Naomi Sheridan
2003	Love Actually	Richard Curtis
2003	Mystic River	Brian Helgeland
2004	Sideways †	Alexander Payne and Jim Taylor
2004	The Aviator	John Logan
2004	Closer	Patrick Marber
2004	Eternal Sunshine of the Spotless Mind ‡	Charlie Kaufman
2004	Finding Neverland	David Magee
2005	Brokeback Mountain †	Larry McMurtry and Diana Ossana
2005	Crash ‡	Paul Haggis and Bobby Moresco
2005	Good Night, and Good Luck.	George Clooney and Grant Heslov
2005	Match Point	Woody Allen
2005	Munich	Tony Kushner and Eric Roth
2006	The Queen	Peter Morgan
2006	Babel	Guillermo Arriaga
2006	The Departed †	William Monahan
2006	Little Children	Todd Field and Tom Perrotta
2006	Notes on a Scandal	Patrick Marber
2007	No Country for Old Men †	Joel Coen and Ethan Coen
2007	Atonement	Christopher Hampton
2007	Charlie Wilson's War	Aaron Sorkin
2007	The Diving Bell and the Butterfly (Le scaphandre et le papillon)	Ronald Harwood
2007	Juno ‡	Diablo Cody
2008	Slumdog Millionaire †	Simon Beaufoy
2008	The Curious Case of Benjamin Button	Eric Roth
2008	Doubt	John Patrick Shanley
2008	Frost/Nixon	Peter Morgan
2008	The Reader	David Hare
2009	Up in the Air	Jason Reitman and Sheldon Turner
2009	District 9	Neill Blomkamp and Terri Tatchell
2009	The Hurt Locker ‡	Mark Boal
2009	Inglourious Basterds	Quentin Tarantino
2009	It's Complicated	Nancy Meyers

=== 2010s ===
Year	Film	Nominees
2010	The Social Network †	Aaron Sorkin
2010	127 Hours	Simon Beaufoy and Danny Boyle
2010	Inception	Christopher Nolan
2010	The Kids Are All Right	Lisa Cholodenko and Stuart Blumberg
2010	The King's Speech ‡	David Seidler
2011	Midnight in Paris ‡	Woody Allen
2011	The Artist	Michel Hazanavicius
2011	The Descendants †	Alexander Payne, Jim Rash, and Nat Faxon
2011	The Ides of March	George Clooney, Grant Heslov, and Beau Willimon
2011	Moneyball	Steven Zaillian and Aaron Sorkin
2012	Django Unchained ‡	Quentin Tarantino
2012	Argo †	Chris Terrio
2012	Lincoln	Tony Kushner
2012	Silver Linings Playbook	David O. Russell
2012	Zero Dark Thirty	Mark Boal
2013	Her ‡	Spike Jonze
2013	12 Years a Slave †	John Ridley
2013	American Hustle	Eric Warren Singer and David O. Russell
2013	Nebraska	Bob Nelson
2013	Philomena	Steve Coogan and Jeff Pope
2014	Birdman ‡	Alejandro G. Iñárritu, Nicolás Giacobone, Alexander Dinelaris Jr., and Armando Bo
2014	Boyhood	Richard Linklater
2014	Gone Girl	Gillian Flynn
2014	The Grand Budapest Hotel	Wes Anderson
2014	The Imitation Game †	Graham Moore
2015	Steve Jobs	Aaron Sorkin
2015	The Big Short †	Adam McKay and Charles Randolph
2015	The Hateful Eight	Quentin Tarantino
2015	Room	Emma Donoghue
2015	Spotlight ‡	Tom McCarthy and Josh Singer
2016	La La Land	Damien Chazelle
2016	Hell or High Water	Taylor Sheridan
2016	Manchester by the Sea ‡	Kenneth Lonergan
2016	Moonlight †	Barry Jenkins
2016	Nocturnal Animals	Tom Ford
2017	Three Billboards Outside Ebbing, Missouri	Martin McDonagh
2017	Lady Bird	Greta Gerwig
2017	Molly's Game	Aaron Sorkin
2017	The Post	Liz Hannah and Josh Singer
2017	The Shape of Water	Guillermo del Toro and Vanessa Taylor
2018	Green Book ‡	Nick Vallelonga, Brian Hayes Currie, and Peter Farrelly
2018	The Favourite	Deborah Davis and Tony McNamara
2018	If Beale Street Could Talk	Barry Jenkins
2018	Roma	Alfonso Cuarón
2018	Vice	Adam McKay
2019	Once Upon a Time in Hollywood	Quentin Tarantino
2019	The Irishman	Steven Zaillian
2019	Marriage Story	Noah Baumbach
2019	Parasite ‡	Bong Joon-Ho and Han Jin Won
2019	The Two Popes	Anthony McCarten

=== 2020s ===
Year	Film	Nominees
2020	The Trial of the Chicago 7	Aaron Sorkin
2020	Promising Young Woman ‡	Emerald Fennell
2020	Mank	Jack Fincher (posthumous)
2020	The Father †	Florian Zeller and Christopher Hampton
2020	Nomadland	Chloé Zhao
2021	Belfast ‡	Kenneth Branagh
2021	Licorice Pizza	Paul Thomas Anderson
2021	The Power of the Dog	Jane Campion
2021	Don't Look Up	Adam McKay
2021	Being the Ricardos	Aaron Sorkin
2022	The Banshees of Inisherin	Martin McDonagh
2022	Tár	Todd Field
2022	Everything Everywhere All at Once ‡	Daniel Kwan and Daniel Scheinert
2022	Women Talking†	Sarah Polley
2022	The Fabelmans	Steven Spielberg and Tony Kushner
2023	Anatomy of a Fall ‡	Justine Triet and Arthur Harari
2023	Barbie	Greta Gerwig and Noah Baumbach
2023	Oppenheimer	Christopher Nolan
2023	Killers of the Flower Moon	Eric Roth and Martin Scorsese
2023	Past Lives	Celine Song
2023	Poor Things	Tony McNamara
2024	Conclave †	Peter Straughan
2024	Emilia Pérez	Jacques Audiard
2024	Anora ‡	Sean Baker
2024	The Brutalist	Brady Corbet and Mona Fastvold
2024	A Real Pain	Jesse Eisenberg
2024	The Substance	Coralie Fargeat
2025	One Battle After Another †	Paul Thomas Anderson
2025	Marty Supreme	Ronald Bronstein and Josh Safdie
2025	Sinners ‡	Ryan Coogler
2025	It Was Just an Accident	Jafar Panahi
2025	Sentimental Value	Eskil Vogt and Joachim Trier
2025	Hamnet	Chloé Zhao and Maggie O'Farrell

== Multiple wins and nominations ==
=== Multiple wins ===
Wins	Screenwriter
3	Robert Bolt
3	Aaron Sorkin
3	Quentin Tarantino
2	Woody Allen
2	Paddy Chayefsky
2	Martin McDonagh
2	Alexander Payne
2	Stirling Silliphant

=== Three or more nominations ===
Nominations	Screenwriter
9	Aaron Sorkin
6	Woody Allen
5	Eric Roth
5	Quentin Tarantino
4	Francis Ford Coppola
4	Stirling Silliphant
4	Oliver Stone
3	Robert Benton
3	Robert Bolt
3	James L. Brooks
3	Ethan Coen
3	Joel Coen
3	William Goldman
3	Tony Kushner
3	David Mamet
3	Adam McKay
3	Christopher Nolan
3	Alexander Payne
3	Mario Puzo
3	Neil Simon
3	Steven Zaillian

== See also ==
- Academy Award for Best Story
- BAFTA Award for Best Original Screenplay
- BAFTA Award for Best Adapted Screenplay
- Academy Award for Best Original Screenplay
- Academy Award for Best Adapted Screenplay
- AACTA International Award for Best Screenplay
- Critics' Choice Movie Award for Best Screenplay
- Writers Guild of America Award for Best Original Screenplay
- Writers Guild of America Award for Best Adapted Screenplay
