= A House Is Not a Home (film) =

1964 film by Russell Rouse

- Theatrical release poster
- Directed by: Russell Rouse
- Written by: Russell Rouse; Clarence Greene
- Based on: A House Is Not a Home; 1953 autobiography by Polly Adler
- Produced by: Clarence Greene
- Starring: Shelley Winters; Robert Taylor; Cesar Romero; Ralph Taeger; Kaye Ballard; Broderick Crawford
- Cinematography: Harold E. Stine
- Edited by: Chester W. Schaeffer
- Music by: Joseph Weiss
- Distributed by: Embassy Pictures Corporation
- Release dates: August 12, 1964 (San Francisco); September 1, 1964 (New York)
- Running time: 98 minutes
- Country: United States
- Language: English

A House Is Not a Home is a 1964 American drama film directed by Russell Rouse and written by Rouse and Clarence Greene, loosely based on the 1953 autobiography by madam Polly Adler. The film stars Shelley Winters, Robert Taylor, Cesar Romero, and Kaye Ballard, with Raquel Welch in her film debut as a call girl. The song of the same name, written for the film by Burt Bacharach and Hal David, has become a standard.

== Plot ==
Polly Adler is a high class madam, who at a party at her bordello looks back at her life, beginning as a poor and naïve young Polish immigrant who works in a sweatshop. After she is sexually assaulted by her boss, for which her housemates blame her, she then is forced to move out. Having lost her job and lodgings, a friend brings her to a restaurant where she is introduced to Frank Costigan, a bootlegger, who lets her live in a plush apartment he uses for his affair with a married woman. When this relationship fails, Polly fixes him up with an attractive girlfriend, whom he takes to the apartment that night. After Polly returns, the woman splits the money Frank has given her with Polly. Frank approves of Polly's attractive girlfriends and starts paying her to have the ladies meet socially with his friends. Soon Polly is the madam of a high-class brothel, paying off police while hosting meetings and brokering cash transactions between political figures and gangsters. At a club, she sees singer and trumpeter Casey Booth, who earlier in the story had protected her against the man who raped her. She recommends Casey to a producer of musicals, and after he gets a job on a new musical, he contacts her and asks her to dinner. She has genuine feelings for Casey, but at first does not reveal her true occupation to him. Eventually Casey proposes marriage, so Polly finally confesses what she does for a living. He is horrified. Later, he turns up at her house drunk and loud, and is ejected by Costigan's men.

Costigan becomes the top enforcer for mob boss Lucky Luciano and backs Polly's business, which ends up on Park Avenue offering high-class call girls. When the district attorney begin to move in on Luciano accusing him of involvement with brothels, it transpires the brother of one of the key members of the organisation is shaking down the sex trade. The two brothers fight, and both are shot dead. Her friend phones Polly and asks her to Vito's for a special party. This is a ruse: Casey meets her again and asks for forgiveness. When she tells him Casey has asked her to marry him, Costigan tells her she can't marry and that this will destroy Casey. Polly protests but Costigan has changed her mind. On the phone, she tearfully tells Casey it is for the best if they part. She hangs up and returns to the party.

== Cast ==
Actor	Role
Shelley Winters	Polly Adler
Robert Taylor	Frank Costigan
Cesar Romero	Lucky Luciano
Ralph Taeger	Casey Booth
Kaye Ballard	Sidonia
Broderick Crawford	Harrigan
Mickey Shaughnessy	Police Sgt. Riordan
Jesse White	Rafferty
Lisa Seagram	Madge
Meri Welles	Lorraine
Connie Gilchrist	Hattie Miller
Constance Dane	Laura
Allyson Ames	Gwen
Lewis Charles	Angelo
Steve Peck	Vince
Roger C. Carmel	Dixie Keeler
J. Pat O'Malley	Muldoon
Sandra Grant	Call Girl
Raquel Welch	Call Girl
Francine Pyne	Red-Call Girl
Edy Williams	Call Girl
Charles Fredericks	Bert
Danica d'Hondt	Vicki
Ge Ge Galligan	Dorothy

== Award nominations ==
Edith Head was nominated for the Academy Award for Best Costume Design, Black-and-White.
