= Color Me Dead =

- Theatrical release poster
- Directed by: Eddie Davis
- Written by: Russell Rouse; Clarence Greene
- Based on: D.O.A. 1950 film by: Rudolph Maté; Russell Rouse; Clarence Greene
- Produced by: Eddie Davis; Reginald Goldsworthy
- Starring: Tom Tryon; Carolyn Jones
- Cinematography: Mick Bornemann
- Edited by: Warren Adams
- Music by: Bob Young
- Production companies: Goldsworthy Productions; Commonwealth United Corporation
- Distributed by: MGM
- Release date: December 1969
- Running time: 97 minutes
- Country: Australia
- Language: English
- Budget: $500,000

Color Me Dead is a 1969 Australian thriller directed by Eddie Davis, starring American actors Tom Tryon, Carolyn Jones and Rick Jason. It is a remake of the 1950 film D.O.A. Due to the failure on renewing copyright of D.O.A., the content of D.O.A. became the property of United States public domain. Thus, the content of Color Me Dead could be exactly the same as D.O.A.

== Plot ==
Chartered accountant Frank Bigelow discovers he has been poisoned while on vacation and has only a week to live. He spends the rest of his time tracking down his own murderer.

The starting scenes show George Reynolds (Raymond Rakubian) stealing a piece of iridium from a wall safe and selling it to Mr. Phillips. At the same time, Frank Bigelow, a Chartered Accountant in Mittagong, prepared to go for a one-week vacation, away from his strained relationship with his girlfriend (his secretary, Paula). While Reynolds and Philips were trading the iridium, they asked Bigelow to notarize the transaction's Bill of Sale just before he left the office to catch his train.

After Bigelow arrived at Surfers Paradise for his vacation, he went to the Pink Panther nightclub with a couple he met at the motel. However, he did not notice that someone had changed his drink while he was chatting with a single lady at the bar. The next morning back at the hotel, he felt unwell with a bad stomach ache and went to the local hospital. The doctors explained he was poisoned by a luminous toxin and no antidote had been found. How much time he had left was difficult to predict, but it would be less than a week. Bigelow saw another doctor for a second opinion, and decided the diagnosis was true and the doctor told him someone wanted him dead, Bigelow decided to find out who was out to kill him. Meanwhile, Bigelow received a call from Paula that a Mr. Phillips had tried to reach him many times. However, Bigelow had no idea about who Philips was until Paula told Bigelow he later committed suicide.

To find the person who is trying to kill, Bigelow went to Sydney and met Philips' controller (Mr. Halliday) and secretary Miss Foster. They told Bigelow that Philips committed suicide by jumping from his apartment. To investigate whether Philips died by suicide or another cause, Bigelow went Philips' house, but Philips' wife and relatives did not know anything. At this time, Miss Foster provided some important information; Philips had called a model (Marlo Stevens) before he died. Using this information, Bigelow finally found the person who tried to buy the iridium — Bradley Taylor.

Bradley explained he was doing business, though he was deceived by Philips and his nephew George, because Bradley finally found out his nephew stole his iridium to sell to Philips, and Philips sold it to Bradley again. Therefore, at this time, Bigelow came to ask why he was trying to kill Philips and the others, Bradley got angry and decided Bigelow knew too much. Thus, Bradley asked his subordinates to kill Bigelow, though Bigelow is already a dead man walking.

Luckily, Bigelow escaped Bradley's attempt, and went back to Philips' home, but he found Mrs. Phillips and her brother had been poisoned as well. He was told Philips' controller (Mr. Halliday) had been here before. Now, he realized the first person who was trying to kill him is Philips' controller; after Philips sold the iridium to Bradley, Philips got $60,000 in cash and Halliday had stolen it. After Bradley found the problem with his iridium, he wanted to get the money back from Philips. Halliday already took the money, and to avoid Phillips, he told Bradley the truth, and decided to kill those who knew of the transaction. Bigelow, with little time to live, killed Halliday and went to the police station to report his own murder before collapsing dead. The film ends with Paula arriving at the police station to see Bigelow's body.

== Cast ==
- Tom Tryon as Frank Bigelow
- Carolyn Jones as Paula Gibson
- Rick Jason as Bradley Taylor
- Pat Connolly as Marla Rukubian
- Tony Ward as Halliday
- Penny Sugg as Miss Foster
- Reg Gillam as Eugene Phillips
- Margot Reid as Mrs Phillips
- Peter Sumner as Stanley Phillips
- Michael Laurence as George Reynolds
- Sandy Harbutt as Chester
- John Dease as Doctor Matson
- Tom Oliver as Doctor McDonald
- Phil Haldemann as Hotel Clerk
- Moya O'Sullivan as Maid

== Production ==
The film was the second of three movies Eddie Davis made in Australia for Reg Goldsworthy: It Takes All Kinds, Color Me Dead, and That Lady from Peking. Shooting began in September 1968 and took place in Mittagong, Surfers Paradise and Sydney. The common feature of these three movies is that the main actors are Americans and the Australian company Goldsworthy Productions provided the other resources of the movie, such as the $500,000 budget.

== Reception ==
The film was poorly received critically and commercially. Although the stars, Tom Tryon and Carolyn Jones, were already well established film actors before they appeared in this movie, Color Me Dead did not have a big impact on their subsequent careers.

Filmink argued the leads were "second-tier names... who weren’t really stars but rather 'people who have starred in American films and thus are meant to be impressive'."

Nan Musgrove has evaluated that "Color Me Dead, the Goldsworthy Productions film which, it is expected, will be a boost to the Australian movie industry, is one of the few films I have watched being made. On its budget of $500,000 it is an accomplishment and more than pleasantly surprised the experts."

== See also ==
- Kate – 2021 American remake of the 1950 film
