= 10th Golden Globe Awards =

Film award ceremony in 1953

- Date: February 26, 1953

Highlights
- Best Picture: The Greatest Show on Earth

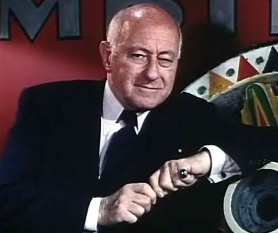
Cecil B. DeMille won Best Director for The Greatest Show on Earth and the film won Best Picture

The 10th Golden Globe Awards, honoring the best in film for 1952 films, were held on February 26, 1953, at the Ambassador Hotel in Los Angeles.

== Winners and Nominees ==
=== Best Motion Picture – Drama ===
The Greatest Show on Earth

- Come Back, Little Sheba
- The Happy Time
- High Noon
- The Thief

=== Best Motion Picture – Comedy or Musical ===
With a Song in My Heart

- Hans Christian Andersen
- I'll See You in My Dreams
- Singin' in the Rain
- Stars and Stripes Forever

=== Best Performance by an Actor in a Motion Picture – Drama ===
Gary Cooper – High Noon

- Charles Boyer – The Happy Time
- Ray Milland – The Thief

=== Best Performance by an Actress in a Motion Picture – Drama ===
Shirley Booth – Come Back, Little Sheba

- Joan Crawford – Sudden Fear
- Olivia de Havilland – My Cousin Rachel

=== Best Performance by an Actor in a Motion Picture – Comedy or Musical ===
Donald O'Connor – Singin' in the Rain

- Danny Kaye – Hans Christian Andersen
- Clifton Webb – Stars and Stripes Forever

=== Best Performance by an Actress in a Motion Picture – Comedy or Musical ===
Susan Hayward – With a Song in My Heart

- Katharine Hepburn – Pat and Mike
- Ginger Rogers – Monkey Business

=== Best Performance by an Actor in a Supporting Role in a Motion Picture ===
Millard Mitchell – My Six Convicts

- Kurt Kasznar – The Happy Time
- Gilbert Roland – The Bad and the Beautiful

=== Best Performance by an Actress in a Supporting Role in a Motion Picture ===
Katy Jurado – High Noon

- Mildred Dunnock – Viva Zapata!
- Gloria Grahame – The Bad and the Beautiful

=== Best Direction – Motion Picture ===
Cecil B. DeMille – The Greatest Show on Earth

- Richard Fleischer – The Happy Time
- John Ford – The Quiet Man

=== Best Screenplay – Motion Picture ===
5 Fingers – Michael Wilson

- High Noon – Carl Foreman
- The Thief – Clarence Greene

=== Best Music, Original Score – Motion Picture ===
High Noon – Dimitri Tiomkin

- Ivanhoe – Miklós Rózsa
- The Quiet Man – Victor Young

=== Cinematography – Black and White ===
High Noon

- The Four Poster
- The Thief

=== Cinematography – Color ===
The Greatest Show on Earth – George Barnes; J. Peverell Marley

=== Promoting International Understanding ===
Anything Can Happen

- Assignment: Paris
- Ivanhoe

=== Special Achievement Award ===
Francis Kee Teller

=== Henrietta Award (World Film Favorites) ===
Susan Hayward and John Wayne

=== Cecil B. DeMille Award ===
Walt Disney

- Stanley Kramer
- Adolph Zukor

=== New Star of the Year Actor ===
My Cousin Rachel – Richard Burton

- Pat and Mike – Aldo Ray
- Stars and Stripes Forever – Robert Wagner

=== New Star of the Year Actress ===
Moulin Rouge – Colette Marchand

- The Thief – Rita Gam
- High Noon – Katy Jurado

=== Juvenile Performance ===
The Member of the Wedding – Brandon deWilde

- Navajo – Francis Kee Teller
- My Pal Gus – George Winslow
