= The Oscar (film) =

1966 telefilm by Russell Rouse

- Film poster by Howard Terpning
- Directed by: Russell Rouse
- Screenplay by: Harlan Ellison; Clarence Greene; Russell Rouse
- Based on: The Oscar; 1963 novel by Richard Sale
- Produced by: Clarence Greene
- Starring: Stephen Boyd; Elke Sommer; Milton Berle; Eleanor Parker; Joseph Cotten; Jill St. John; Tony Bennett; Edie Adams; Ernest Borgnine
- Narrated by: Tony Bennett
- Cinematography: Joseph Ruttenberg
- Edited by: Chester Schaeffer
- Music by: Percy Faith
- Color process: Pathécolor
- Production company: Greene-Rouse Productions
- Distributed by: Embassy Pictures (USA), Paramount Pictures (Internationally)
- Release date: March 4, 1966
- Running time: 121 minutes
- Country: United States
- Language: English
- Budget: $3 million

The Oscar is a 1966 American drama film directed by Russell Rouse and starring Stephen Boyd, Elke Sommer, Milton Berle, Eleanor Parker, Joseph Cotten, Jill St. John, Tony Bennett, Edie Adams and Ernest Borgnine.

The Oscar features several real Oscar winners in its cast and crew: along with Edith Head (who would also be nominated, but not win, for The Oscar), the film features Best Actor winners Borgnine and Broderick Crawford; Best Supporting Actor winners Ed Begley, Walter Brennan, Frank Sinatra, and James Dunn; and cinematographer Joseph Ruttenberg. Also in the cast were Merle Oberon and Eleanor Parker, who had both been nominated for Oscars but did not win. Bob Hope, who plays himself hosting the Oscars, was a real-life, frequent mainstay emcee at ceremonies for decades, and although never nominated, received five honorary Oscars during the course of his storied career.

== Plot ==
As movie star Frankie Fane is about to hear if he won the Best Actor Oscar, his friend Hymie Kelly, sitting near Frankie during the ceremony, reminisces about Fane's struggle to the top, beginning as a spieler for his stripper girlfriend Laurel. After moving to New York City, Frankie dumps Laurel for a budding fashion designer, Kay Bergdahl, which leads to a chance meeting with talent scout Sophie Cantaro. Sophie arranges for him to be signed with agent "Kappy" Kapstetter and brings Frankie to Hollywood, where he quickly becomes a rising star.

At each turn, Fane is an unprincipled heel, using and hurting others and causing them to recoil from him. He impulsively persuades Kay to marry him in Tijuana but treats her cruelly thereafter. Frankie buys expensive homes and cars while offending the studio chief, Regan, until his life goes into a tailspin when he suddenly becomes "box office poison". At his lowest ebb, he unexpectedly receives an Oscar nomination, which Kappy believes is the result of Fane's portrayal of a "man without morals", essentially portraying himself.

In order to ensure his victory, he secretly employs the services of a crooked private investigator, Barney Yale, who leaks information intended to influence voters to sympathize with Fane and support his Oscar candidacy. Frankie doesn't care that the scandal smears the reputations of Hymie and Laurel. An enraged Hymie confronts him, telling how he married Laurel, who then died during an abortion while pregnant with a child fathered by Frankie. Yale also blackmails Fane, who desperately turns to Yale's ex-wife for help to keep his ruse from being exposed.

The moment of truth comes at the Academy Awards, as presenter Merle Oberon announces the winner. As she states the name "Frank", Fane rises, prepared to bolt to the stage; she then follows with "Sinatra". As Frank Sinatra moves towards the stage, Fane is left stunned and crestfallen, clapping his hands weakly and collapsing in his seat, while everyone in the assemblage whom he has wronged enjoys the comeuppance delivered to this wholly self-absorbed, unfeeling individual.

== Cast ==
- Stephen Boyd as Frankie Fane
- Elke Sommer as Kay Bergdahl
- Milton Berle as Kappy Kapstetter
- Eleanor Parker as Sophie Cantaro
- Joseph Cotten as Kenneth H. Regan
- Jill St. John as Laurel Scott
- Tony Bennett as Hymie Kelly
- Edie Adams as Trina Yale
- Ernest Borgnine as Barney Yale
- Ed Begley as Grobard
- Walter Brennan as Orrin C. Quentin
- Broderick Crawford as Sheriff
- James Dunn as Network Executive
- Edith Head as herself
- Bob Hope as himself, hosting the Oscars
- Hedda Hopper as herself
- Peter Lawford as Steve Marks
- Merle Oberon as herself
- Frank Sinatra as himself
- Nancy Sinatra as herself
- Jack Soo as Sam
- Jean Hale as Cheryl Barker
- Eddie Ryder as Mexican Marriage Broker
- Chris Alcaide as Ledbetter
- John Dennis as Sid
- Peter Leeds as Bert
- John Holland as Stevens
- Jean Bartel as Secretary
- John Crowther as Wally
- Cosmo Sardo as Academy Awards Guest

== Release ==
=== Broadcast ===
The Oscar made its network television debut on February 12, 1969, on ABC. ABC moved the film to 8:30 pm Eastern due to canceling the comedy show Turn-On after only one episode. TNT later included The Oscar in a film series called "Bad Movies We Love".

It was released on DVD and Blu-ray by Kino Lorber on February 4, 2020.

== Reception ==
=== Critical response ===
While the film is technically a drama, many consider it to be an unintentional campy comedy, with critics skewering the script and performances. Others consider it most likely to be a burlesque, given the stature of the actors involved (one of the few things critics liked about the film was Berle, a classic comedian in a dramatic role).

Bosley Crowther of The New York Times panned the film, writing, "Not only is this screen translation of a novel by Richard Sale about a cheapskate Hollywood actor who tries to bludgeon his way to an Academy Award a piece of expensive claptrap, loaded with harrowing clichés but it also is shamelessly endorsed by the presence of some of the great and near great of Hollywood." Variety noted that the filmmakers "make handsome use of the Hollywood background as setting for a narrative some may accept as typical of the Oscar race and others may not accept at all." Philip K. Scheuer of the Los Angeles Times wrote that like executive producer Joseph E. Levine's earlier films, it "is filled with people who, if they are not mean and despicable, are just weak or fear-ridden. The picture's own weakness is that they are characters first and people second; their motivations do not so much proceed from inside themselves as from the written screenplay." Richard L. Coe of The Washington Post stated, "The Academy of Motion Picture Arts and Sciences must have been on an LSD kick when it allowed itself to be used for 'The Oscar' ... That the story is a sleazy slice of muck is bad enough but for those presumably in charge of 'Oscar's' public image in an image-conscious 'industry' to permit such an association is far worse. For not only is the 'hero' of this yarn a totally cardboard heel, there is no evident justification for his role to have been nominated." The Monthly Film Bulletin declared, "Acres of screaming dialogue and mountainous moral question-marks can in no way disguise the basic silliness of this exercise."

Tony Bennett never made another feature film (outside of some cameos as himself in later films), and later "won" the Golden Turkey Award for "Worst Performance by a Popular Singer". The Oscar also marked the near-endpoint of Clarence Greene and Russell Rouse's careers; they made just one more feature afterwards: 1967's The Caper of the Golden Bulls, which they respectively produced and directed, but did not write, and which had already begun production at the time The Oscar premiered. For co-screenwriter Harlan Ellison, The Oscar was both the first and last produced feature screenplay he wrote in his over 60-year writing career.

Rotten Tomatoes stated:

"This attempt at showing up the seamy underside of the film industry is in itself a testament to the overblown excesses of Hollywood before the Easy Riders and Raging Bulls shook things up. But that doesn't mean the story of Frankie Fane, amoral gigolo who claws his way to the top of the A-list, isn't enormously entertaining. Seething, sleazy, and sensational, it's constantly guffaw-worthy, not least for Tony Bennett's disastrous performance as Hymie, Fane's version of Entourage's Turtle, and a glittering parade of stars doing cameos of themselves."

== Accolades ==
Award	Category	Subject	Result
Academy Awards	Best Art Direction	Arthur Lonergan, Hal Pereira, Robert R. Benton, James W. Payne	Nominated
Academy Awards	Best Costume Design	Edith Head	Nominated
Bambi Award	Best Actress - National	Elke Sommer	Nominated
Golden Turkey Award	Worst Performance By a Popular Singer	Tony Bennett	Won

== See also ==
- List of American films of 1966
- Oscar bait
- Oscar season
- Naked Gun 33 1/3: The Final Insult, a 1994 film that features a third act set at the Academy Awards
- For Your Consideration, 2006 comedy film with similar themes
