= Thunder in the Sun =

1959 film by Russell Rouse

- Directed by: Russell Rouse
- Written by: Russell Rouse; Stewart Stern
- Based on: Story by James Hill; Guy Trosper
- Produced by: Clarence Greene
- Starring: Susan Hayward; Jeff Chandler
- Cinematography: Stanley Cortez
- Edited by: Chester W. Schaeffer
- Music by: Cyril J. Mockridge
- Production companies: Seven Arts Productions; Carrollton Inc
- Distributed by: Paramount Pictures
- Release date: April 8, 1959
- Running time: 81 minutes
- Country: United States
- Language: English
- Box office: $1.8 million (est. US/ Canada rentals)

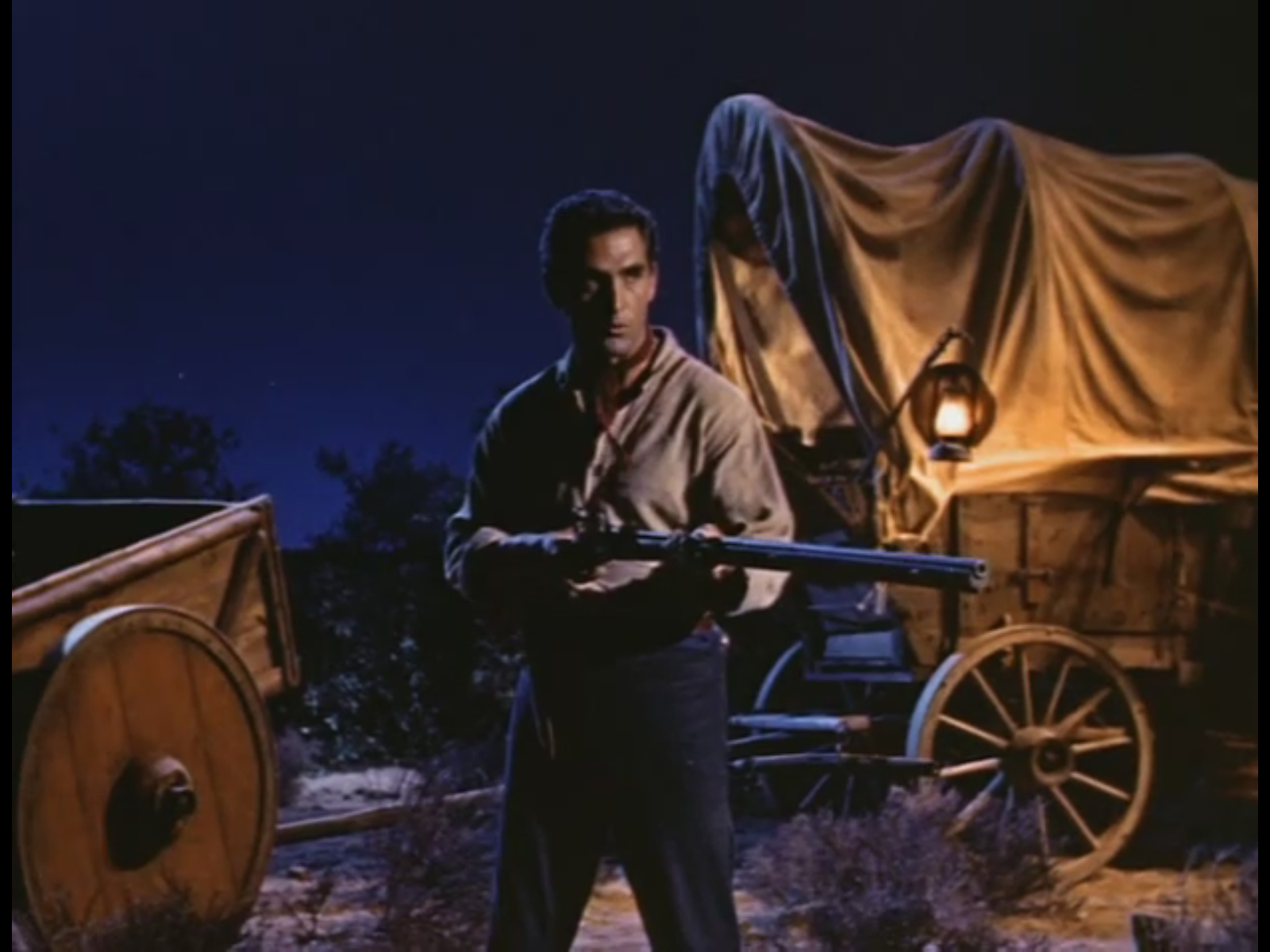
Jacques Bergerac as Pepe Dauphin

Thunder in the Sun is a 1959 American Western film directed by Russell Rouse and starring Susan Hayward and Jeff Chandler.

== Plot ==
The film shows a family of French Basque immigrants pioneering into the Wild West in 1850 while carrying their ancestral vines. Hard drinking trail driver Lon Bennett is hired to lead them and he falls for the spirited Gabrielle Dauphin.

== Cast ==
- Susan Hayward as Gabrielle Dauphin
- Jeff Chandler as Lon Bennett
- Jacques Bergerac as Pepe Dauphin
- Blanche Yurka as Louise Dauphin
- Carl Esmond as Andre Dauphin
- Fortunio Bonanova as Fernando Christophe
- Bertrand Castelli as Edmond Duquette
- Albert Carrier as Basque
- Felix Locher as Danielle
- Michele Marly
- Albert Villasainte
- Veda Ann Borg as Marie

== Production ==
The film was made by Seven Arts Productions and acquired by Paramount for distribution. It was the company's third film, after Gunrunners and Ten Seconds to Hell. It was known during filming as Between the Thunder and the Sun and The Gun and the Arrow.

Filming started 21 July 1958 with location work in Mount Whitney.

== Reception ==
The film is infamous among Basques for its misunderstandings of Basque customs, such as the use of the xistera (a device of the jai alai sport) as a weapon or shouting irrintzi ululations as meaningful communication.

Other commentators, though, have noted the well-staged action scenes, the absorbing story, and the excellent cinematography.

Variety called it "leaden and mundane."

== See also ==
- List of American films of 1959
