= They Never Come Back (play) =

- Original language: English
- Written by: Maurice Francis
- Subject: World War Two
- Genre: drama
- Setting: Sydney, Australia

Premiere
- Date: February 16, 1945
- Place: Assembly Hall, Margaret St, Sydney
- Directed by: Maurice Francis

They Never Come Back is a 1945 Australian play by Maurice Francis. Francis was Australia's most prolific radio writer, regularly working for George Edwards. He decided to produce his own stage play, They Never Come Back and put it on in opposition to J.C. Williamson's. It was a rare Australian play to deal with a contemporary issue at the time, in this case trauma of returned servicemen.

The play was a financial disaster and led to Francis having to declare bankruptcy. The court ordered no action be taken against him.

Francis said "Although the critics reported it as a good play, the public wouldn't go to the Assembly Hall. After three weeks, the Chief Secretary closed the show, as there were no fire curtains. I was glad, because money was going down the drain."

A copy of the play is at the University of New England library.

== Premise ==
A returned serviceman - a young ex-RAAF squadron leader, winner of the DFC - works as an insurance clerk but struggles to adjust to civilian life. He winds up murdering his wife after she confesses to being unfaithful while he was away.

== Original cast ==
- Ron Roberts as the returned serviceman
- Judy Stretton as his wife
- Norman Blackler as his friend
- Paul Philips as his neighbour
- Patricia Minchin as his sister in law

== Production background ==
In the 1930s Francis established himself as one of the leading commercial radio writers in the country. He served in the Army for four years during World War Two. In 1945 he formed Maurice Francis Enterprises, comprising a syndicate of five people who each invested £75, to put on plays, starting with They Never Came Back. "I was very enthusiastic about putting on a stage show in opposition to J. C.Williamson," Francis said later.

Francis later recalled, "I knew very little about business, and the whole enterprise was shockingly loosely run. No records, were kept, and when I had to fill in forms for the Official Receiver I had to ring up everyone and ask them what I owed them."

== Critical reception ==
The Sydney Morning Herald said Francis "has begun his play at such a pitch of intensity and develops it so rapidly that its crescendo of suspense may be completely blurred, if capital acting and capital production are missing."

Another review in the same paper said "Despite crudities in his own writing... Maurice Francis gripped and held the attention of audiences... It was a good idea for a play, rather than a good play. In fact, no play in Sydney in recent years has been so likely to provoke wide discussion and debate upon the theme it treats–the problem of the psychological adjustment of Servicemen on their return to civilian life. For that reason, it may succeed, even though Its painful neglect of some of the basic principles of dramaturgy would be reason enough, normally, for it to fail."

The Daily Telegraph said "Based on an extreme and tragic case, the play makes a strong appeal for understanding of the ex-service man's need in his efforts to rehabilitate 'himself in civil life... This enterprise, which promises something new and enthusiastic in our dramatic field, deserves the support of every theatre-goer."

The Bulletin said "The over-emphasis of gloom piled upon gloom showed lack of observation and psychological insight rather than lack of technical skill, though the play abounded in crudities. Only the dark side was presented, the returned man’s main relief from morosely drinking being to bury his head in his hands and say “This is hell.” It is. "

Francis later said in 1947 "I still think it was a good play. It was the first I had put on, but I do not think it will be the last." He went to work for the Repatriation Department and later wrote the plays Nothing Worth While, Present Again and Go West, Young Man.
