= They Never Come Back =

They Never Come Back may refer to:

- They Never Come Back (film), a 1932 American pre-Code drama film
- They Never Come Back (play), a 1945 Australian play by Maurice Francis
