= Harold E. Stine =

American cinematographer

- Born: Harold Eugene Stine; September 21, 1903; Chino, California, U.S.
- Died: November 2, 1977 (aged 74); Glendale, California, U.S.
- Occupation: Cinematographer
- Years active: 1929-1972
- Relatives: Clifford Stine (brother)

Harold Eugene Stine, ASC (September 21, 1903 - November 2, 1977) was an American cinematographer. He was nominated for an Academy Award for Best Cinematography for The Poseidon Adventure (1972), as well as two Emmy Awards for the television series Cavalcade of America (1955) and Maverick (1959).

== Life and career ==
Born in Chino, California, Stine entered the film industry in the late 1920s as a sound engineer. He moved into the camera department during the 1940s, working as a visual effects artist and cameraman at RKO Pictures, notably shooting rear projection for Mighty Joe Young (1949) and The Thing from Another World (1951).

Stine made his debut as a cinematographer on the television series Family Theater. During the 1950s and '60s, he was a cinematographer on several popular television series, most notably on Adventures of Superman, 77 Sunset Strip, Cheyenne, Maverick, and The High Chaparral. He was also the director of photography for the 39th Academy Awards. Stine received two Primetime Emmy Award nominations for his TV work, and served on the Academy of Television Arts & Sciences' photography committee.

In film, he was the regular cinematographer for director-producer William Castle. In 1970, Stine received renewed attention for his work on Robert Altman's hit film M*A*S*H (1970). Three years later, he received a Best Cinematography Oscar for his work on the blockbuster disaster film The Poseidon Adventure (1972). This also proved Stine's final film, as he retired soon after.

== Death ==
Stine died in Glendale on 2 November 1977, aged 74.

== Partial filmography ==
- Man of Conflict (1953)
- Girl on the Run (1958)
- The Couch (1962)
- House of Women (1962)
- Black Gold (1962)
- The Incredible Mr. Limpet (1964)
- For Those Who Think Young (1964)
- A House Is Not a Home (1964)
- The Night Walker (1964)
- Johnny Reno (1966)
- The Last of the Secret Agents? (1966)
- The Busy Body (1967)
- The Caper of the Golden Bulls (1967)
- Chuka (1967)
- The Spirit Is Willing (1967)
- Project X (1968)
- MASH (1970)
- The Todd Killings (1971)
- The Poseidon Adventure (1972)
