= Walter Coy =

American actor

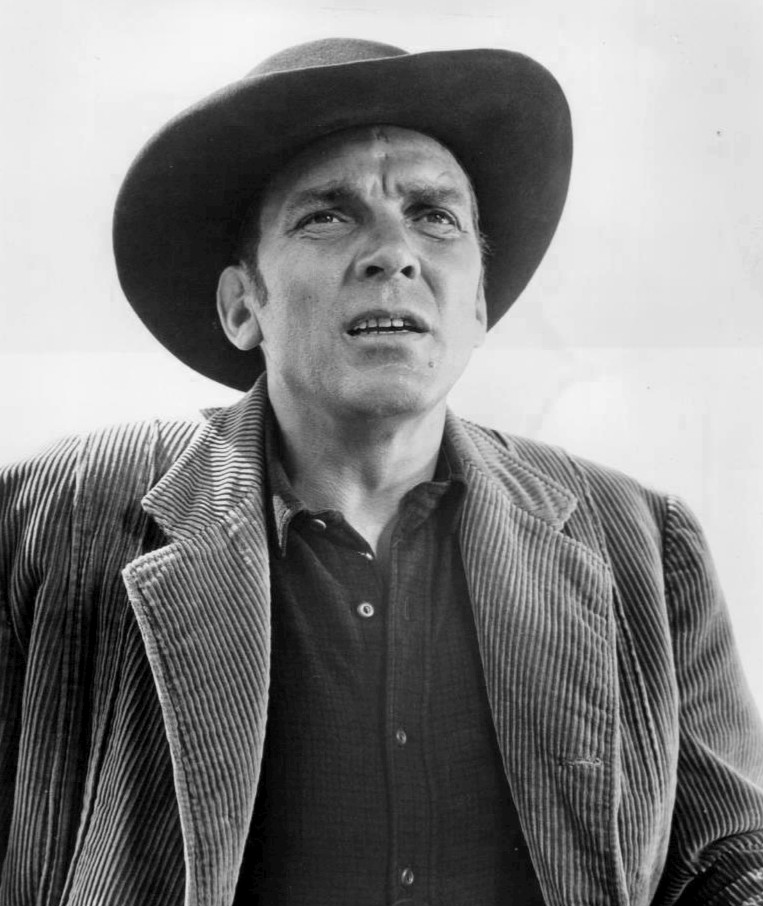
- Coy in Frontier, 1955.
- Born: Walter Darrwin Coy; January 31, 1909; Great Falls, Cascade County; Montana, U.S.
- Died: December 11, 1974 (aged 65); Santa Maria; Santa Barbara County; California, U.S.
- Education: University of Washington
- Occupation: Actor
- Years active: 1936–1974
- Spouses: Anne Burr (m. 1942; div. 194?); Pamela Gillespie (m. 1948; div. 1961) Ruth E. Harburger (m. 1969; div. 1971)
- Children: 3

Walter Darwin Coy (January 31, 1909 – December 11, 1974) was an American stage, radio, film, and, principally, television actor, arguably most well known as the brother of John Wayne's character in The Searchers (1956).

== Early years ==
Originally from Great Falls, Montana, Coy was the son of Theodore Coy, who had a furniture store. The family moved to Seattle, Washington, around 1923. He played varsity football at the University of Washington and majored in dramatics.

Before Coy became an actor, he worked at salmon canneries in Alaska. In 1929, he moved to New York. During World War II, he served in the Army.

== Career ==
Coy performed on Broadway from 1930 to 1948. He appeared in several early Group Theatre productions. He was the first actor to play Lone Wolf on the radio series of the same name.

== Broadway roles ==
- The House of Connelly (1931) - Charlie and as Seranader
- Night Over Taos (1932) - Felipe
- Men in White (1933) - Dr. Bradley
- Gold Eagle Guy (1934) - Adam Keane
- Till the Day I Die (1935) - Karl Taussig
- Waiting For Lefty (1935) - Irv
- Paradise Lost (1935) - Ben
- Case of Clyde Griffiths (1936) - Gilbert Griffiths
- Many Mansions (1937) - George Graham
- Lady in the Dark (1941) - Charley Johnson (replacement)
- Hamlet (1945) - Horatio

== Western programs ==
Of the 31 Frontier episodes, 16 are narrated by Coy:

1. "Paper Gunman" (September 25, 1955)
2. "Tomas and the Widow" (October 2)
3. "A Stillness in Wyoming" (October 16)
4. "The Shame of a Nation" (October 23)
5. "In Nebraska" (October 30)
6. "The Suspects" (November 6)
7. "King of the Dakotas" (2 parts, November 8 and 20)
8. "Cattle Drive to Casper" (November 27)
9. "The Texicans" (January 8, 1956)
10. "Mother of the Brave" (January 15)
11. "The Ten Days of John Leslie" (January 22)
12. "The Devil and Dr. O'Hara" (February 5)
13. "Assassin" (March 4)
14. "The Hanging at Thunder Butte Creek (March 18)
15. "The Hostage" (September 9, 1956)

Coy also appeared on Jim Davis' western anthology series, Stories of the Century in the role of Sam Clayton in the 1954 episode entitled "Tom Horn," an account of the western lawman-turned outlaw Tom Horn. He appeared on many other western television programs, including Cheyenne, Bronco, Cimarron City, The Lone Ranger, The Life and Legend of Wyatt Earp (one episode as Ben Thompson), Shotgun Slade, The Deputy, Bonanza, Bat Masterson, The Adventures of Jim Bowie, Trackdown, Tales of Wells Fargo, Yancy Derringer, Laramie, Two Faces West, Lawman, Wanted: Dead or Alive, The Restless Gun, The Rough Riders, Dick Powell's Zane Grey Theatre, Pony Express, Rawhide, Mackenzie's Raiders, Have Gun – Will Travel, The Texan, The Man from Blackhawk, Hotel de Paree, Overland Trail, Maverick, The Virginian, The Big Valley, Laredo, The Outcasts, Wagon Train (five times), and Robert Conrad's The Wild Wild West.

=== Other television roles ===
Coy portrayed Jason Farrel in the ABC soap opera Flame in the Wind (1965), King Zorvac in the syndicated science fiction series Rocky Jones, Space Ranger (1954) and Jason in the ABC serial A Time for Us.

Other guest-starring roles in drama include Crusader, The Pepsi-Cola Playhouse, Crossroads, Whirlybirds, U.S. Marshal, Rescue 8, The Lineup, East Side/West Side, Mr. Adams and Eve, Mike Hammer, The Defenders, The Man from U.N.C.L.E., Navy Log, Tightrope!, Lock-Up, Lassie, Ironside, M Squad, and I Spy. Coy also appeared in two comedies, McKeever and the Colonel and Hazel, and was cast in the automotive history movie, The Studebaker Story (1953-uncredited role)

Coy's last television role was as Chief Blackfish on the NBC series Daniel Boone in the 1970 episode "How to Become a Goddess".

== Selected filmography ==
- Love Letters of a Star (1936) - Charley Warren
- Barricade (1950) - Benson
- Colt .45 (1950) - Carl (uncredited)
- Saddle Tramp (1950) - Mr Phillips
- Under Mexicali Stars (1950) - Giles Starkey
- FBI Girl (1951) - Priest
- Bugles in the Afternoon (1952) - Capt. Benteen (uncredited)
- The Lusty Men (1952) - Buster Burgess
- Flat Top (1952) - Air Group Commander
- So Big (1953) - Roelf Pool
- All the Brothers Were Valiant (1953) - Noah Shore (uncredited)
- Phantom of the Rue Morgue (1954) - Gendarme Arnot (uncredited)
- Them! (1954) - Reporter (uncredited)
- Sign of the Pagan (1954) - Emperor Valentinian
- Cult of the Cobra (1955) - Police Inspector
- Wichita (1955) - Sam McCoy
- Running Wild (1955) - Lt. Ed Newpole
- The Searchers (1956) - Aaron Edwards
- On the Threshold of Space (1956) - Lt. Col. Dick Masters
- The Fastest Gun Alive (1956) - Clint Fallon (uncredited)
- The Young Guns (1956) - Sheriff Jim Peyton
- Pillars of the Sky (1956) - Maj. Donahue
- Hot Summer Night (1957) - Pete Wayne (uncredited)
- Johnny Tremain (1957) - Dr. Joseph Warren
- Juvenile Jungle (1958) - John Elliot
- South Seas Adventure (1958) - Supplemental Narration (voice)
- The Restless Gun (1959) - Episode "Dead Ringer"
- The Trap (1959) - Second Fake Policeman (uncredited)
- Gunmen from Laredo (1959) - Ben Keefer
- Warlock (1959) - Deputy Sheriff Ray Thomson (uncredited)
- The Gunfight at Dodge City (1959) - Ben Townsend
- North by Northwest (1959) - U.S. Intelligence Agency official (uncredited)
- Cash McCall (1960) - Reporter (uncredited)
- Five Guns to Tombstone (1960) - Ike Garvey
- Gun Fight (1961) - Sheriff
- Catlow (1971) - Parkman
- I Eat Your Skin (1971) - Charles Bentley
- Pancho Villa (1972) - Gen. Pershing
- Hay que matar a B. (1974) - (final film role)

== Television ==
Year	Title	Role	Notes
1961	Rawhide	Lem Trager	S3:E25, "Incident of the Running Man"
