= It Takes All Kinds (film) =

1969 film by Eddie Davis

- Theatrical release poster
- Directed by: Eddie Davis
- Written by: Eddie Davis; Charles E. Savage
- Story by: Edward D. Hoch
- Produced by: Eddie Davis; Reg Goldsworthy
- Starring: Vera Miles; Robert Lansing; Barry Sullivan
- Cinematography: Mick Bornemann
- Edited by: Ian Maitland
- Music by: Bob Young
- Production company: Goldsworthy Productions
- Distributed by: British Empire Films
- Release date: 12 June 1969
- Running time: 98 minutes
- Country: Australia
- Language: English
- Budget: $300,000

It Takes All Kinds is a 1969 Australian crime drama film directed by Eddie Davis.

== Plot ==
American sailor Tony Gunther is asked by Laura Ring to help steal a stained-glass window from a museum. The robbery is a success but then Laura disappears with the window. Tony finds her and she's discovered with crime lord Orville Benton. Benton has a collection of art treasures in the false bottom of a wheat silo. Police capture Benton and his gang but Laura dies.

== Cast ==
- Vera Miles as Laura Ring
- Robert Lansing as Tony Gunther
- Barry Sullivan as Orville Benton
- Sid Melton as Benji
- Penny Sugg as J.P. Duncan
- Chris Christensen as Swede
- Edward Hepple as Cockney
- Tommy Dysart as Seaman
- Alistair Smart as Ray
- Rod Mullinar as Policeman
- Bob Haddow as Dan
- Peter Whittle as Bodyguard
- Reg Gorman as Man at airport
- Roger Ward as Bodyguard
- John Llewellyn as Detective
- Les Berryman

== Production ==
The film was the first of three movies made by Reg Goldsworthy in association with Commonwealth United Corporation for the American television market. The director and leading actors were imported from Hollywood but the rest of the cast and crew were Australian.

It was shot in four weeks in March 1968. Locations were shot around Sydney and Melbourne with interiors done at Ajax Studios in Sydney.

== Release ==
The film was poorly reviewed and was a commercial failure.
