= Joseph Force Crater =

New York judge who disappeared in 1930

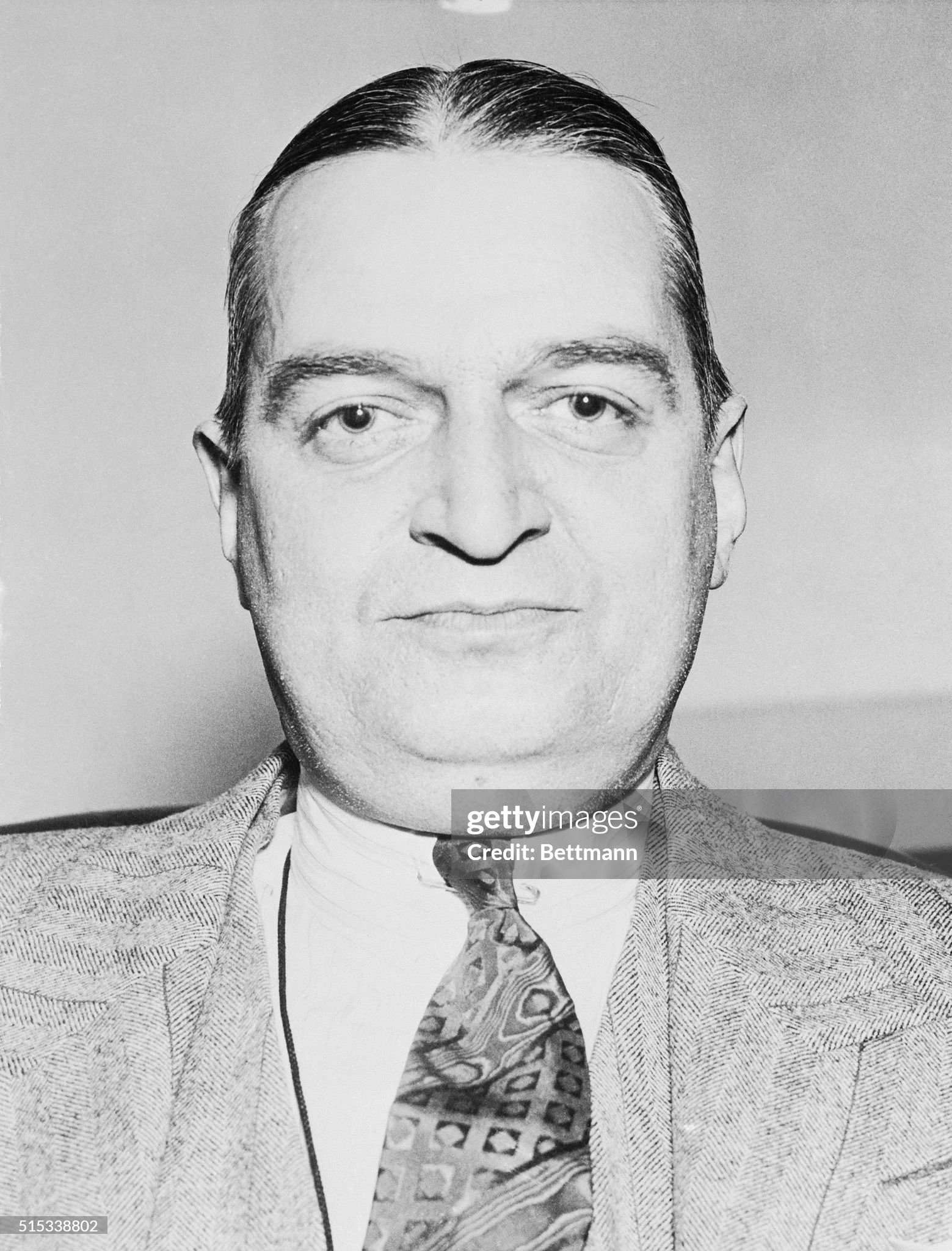
- c. 1930
- Born: January 5, 1889; Easton, Pennsylvania, U.S.
- Disappeared: August 6, 1930 (aged 41); New York City, New York, U.S.
- Status: Declared dead in absentia June 6, 1939
- Education: Lafayette College; Columbia University
- Occupation: Justice of New York Supreme Court for New York County
- Known for: Unexplained disappearance
- Political party: Democratic

Joseph Force Crater (January 5, 1889 – disappeared August 6, 1930; declared legally dead June 6, 1939) was an American lawyer who served as a New York State Supreme Court justice and mysteriously vanished shortly after the state began an investigation into corruption in New York City. Despite massive publicity, the missing person case was never solved and was officially closed forty years after Crater was declared dead.

== Early life and education ==
Joseph Crater was born in Easton, Pennsylvania, the eldest of four children of the former Leila Virginia Montague and Frank Ellsworth Crater, a produce market operator and orchard owner. Both parents had immigrated from Ireland. Crater was educated at Lafayette College (class of 1910) and Columbia University, where he was a member of the Sigma Chi fraternity. During his time at Columbia, he met Stella Mance Wheeler, who was at the time married, and helped her get a divorce. They married seven days after her divorce was finalized, in spring 1917.

== Career ==
Crater opened an office at the Equitable Building in Manhattan, joined Tammany Hall district leader Martin J. Healy's Cayuga Democratic Club, and spent time organizing election workers and representing the club in election law cases.

Four months before his disappearance, on April 8, 1930, Franklin D. Roosevelt, then New York governor, appointed Crater as Justice of the New York Supreme Court for New York County, which is a trial court, despite the designation "supreme" (New York State's highest court is the Court of Appeals). He issued two published opinions: Rotkowitz v. Sohn, February 8, 1930 involving fraudulent conveyances and mortgage foreclosure fraud; and Henderson v. Park Central Motors Service, July 11, 1930 dealing with a garage company's liability for an expensive car stolen and wrecked by an ex-convict.

Attention was later drawn to Crater's liquidation of investments worth $16,000 and withdrawal of $7,000 from his bank account that spring (together equivalent to about US $340,000 in 2024), which was possibly used as a pay-off for his judgeship. He had also given the congratulatory speech at the dinner celebrating George Ewald's judgeship in 1927; accusations of Tammany Hall corruption in that appointment were an initial impetus in the opening of what would become the Seabury Commission in mid-1930.

== Disappearance ==
Crater and his wife were vacationing at their summer cabin in Belgrade, Maine, in the summer of 1930, shortly after the anti-corruption inquiry began. In late July, Crater received a telephone call. He told his wife nothing about the call other than to say that he had to return to New York City "to straighten those fellows out". The next day, he arrived at his apartment at 40 Fifth Avenue in Greenwich Village, but instead of dealing with business, he went to Atlantic City, New Jersey, with showgirl Sally Lou Ritz.

Crater returned to Maine on August 1, then traveled back to New York City on August 3, promising his wife that he would return by her birthday on August 9. She stated that he was in good spirits and behaving normally when he left. On the morning of August 6, Crater spent two hours going through his files in his chambers, reportedly destroying several documents. He then had law clerk Joseph Mara cash two checks for him that amounted to US $5,150 (equivalent to about $77,000 in 2024). At noon, Crater and Mara carried two locked briefcases to Crater's apartment, where Crater told Mara to take the rest of the day off.

That evening, Crater went to a Broadway ticket agency run by friend Joseph Gransky and reserved one seat for a comedy called Dancing Partner at the Belasco Theatre; Gransky was surprised because he and Crater had already seen a preview of the show. Crater then ate dinner at Billy Haas's Chophouse at 332 West 45th Street with Ritz and William Klein, a lawyer friend. Crater's dinner companions gave differing accounts of his departure from the restaurant. Klein initially testified that "the judge got into a taxicab outside the restaurant about 9:30 p.m. and drove west on Forty-fifth Street." This account was initially confirmed by Ritz: "At the sidewalk Judge Crater took a taxicab." Klein and Ritz later changed their story and said that they had entered a taxi outside the restaurant, but Crater had walked down the street.

Crater's disappearance did not elicit any immediate reaction. When he did not return to Maine after ten days, his wife began making calls to their friends in New York, asking whether anyone had seen him. His fellow justices became alarmed when Crater failed to appear for the opening of the courts on August 25; they started a private investigation but failed to find any trace of him. The police were notified on September 3, and after that the missing judge was front-page news.

=== Investigation ===
Detectives discovered that the judge's safe deposit box had been emptied and the two briefcases that Crater and Mara had taken to his apartment were missing. These promising leads were quickly lost amid thousands of false reports from people claiming to have seen the missing judge. A grand jury convened in October 1930 called 95 witnesses and amassed 975 pages of testimony. Mrs. Crater refused to appear. The jury concluded that "the evidence is insufficient to warrant any expression of opinion as to whether Crater is alive or dead, or as to whether he has absented himself voluntarily, or is the sufferer from disease in the nature of amnesia, or is the victim of crime."

Crater enjoyed the city's nightlife; he socialized with many showgirls in addition to his long-term mistress Connie Marcus. Two of these women left town abruptly after his disappearance. Sally Lou Ritz (real name Sarah Ritzi; 1907/1908–2000) had dined with Crater the evening that he vanished and was also rumored to be his mistress; she left New York in August or September 1930. She was found in late September 1930 living in Youngstown, Ohio, with her parents; she said that she had left New York because she had received word that her father was ill. She was still being subjected to interviews by police investigating the Crater case in 1937, by which time she was living in Beverly Hills, California. June Brice, another showgirl, had been seen talking to Crater the day before he disappeared. A lawyer acting for Crater's wife argued that Brice had been at the center of a scheme to blackmail Crater (the reason for the bank withdrawals on the day of his disappearance) and that a gangster boyfriend of Brice had killed the judge. Brice disappeared the day that a grand jury was to convene on the case. In 1948, she was discovered in a mental hospital.

Crater's jacket was reportedly found in the apartment of Vivian Gordon. She was involved in high-end prostitution and linked to madam Polly Adler. Gordon had liaisons with a large number of influential businessmen and was the owner, on paper at least, of a number of properties believed to be fronts for illegal activity. She was also seen around town with gangster Jack "Legs" Diamond, with whom Crater was rumored to socialize. Crater had known Diamond's former boss, organized crime figure Arnold Rothstein, and had been extremely upset at Rothstein's murder. Gordon was angry about a conviction that had resulted in her losing custody of her 16 year-old daughter. On February 20, 1931, she met with a lawyer for the Seabury Commission and offered to testify about police graft. She was murdered five days later. The publicity surrounding Gordon's killing led to the resignation of a policeman whom she had accused of framing her, and the suicide of her daughter. The scandal also refocused attention on the corruption investigation, which ultimately led to the resignation of Mayor Jimmy Walker and largely eliminated Tammany Hall's hold on the city, previously weakened by Rothstein and the conflict over his former empire.

Crater's wife found envelopes containing checks, stocks, bonds, and a note from the justice on January 20, 1931, six months after his disappearance. They were in a dresser drawer that had been empty when searched by police. The discovery led to new but ultimately inconclusive leads, and no further trace of Crater was ever found. The case was officially closed in 1979.

=== Subsequent events ===
Mrs. Crater remained at their vacation home in Maine during the search for her husband, until her discovery of the hidden envelopes. She was evicted from the Fifth Avenue apartment for non-payment of rent. In July 1937, when she was reportedly living on $12 per week (equivalent to $270 in 2025) working as a telephone operator in Maine, she petitioned to have the justice declared officially dead. She married Carl Kunz, a New York City electrical contractor, in Elkton, Maryland, on April 23, 1938. Kunz's first wife had hanged herself eight days before the wedding. Crater was declared legally dead in 1939; his widow received $20,561 in life insurance (equivalent to about $360,000 in 2024). She separated from Kunz in 1950 and died in 1969 at age 70.

Mrs. Crater expressed her belief that her husband had been murdered in her own account of the case, The Empty Robe, which was written with freelance writer and journalist Oscar Fraley and published by Doubleday in 1961.

On August 19, 2005, authorities revealed that after Queens resident Stella Ferrucci-Good's death at age 91, they had received notes she wrote in which she claimed that her husband, NYPD detective Robert Good, had learned that Crater was killed by Charles Burns, an NYPD officer who also worked as a bodyguard of Murder, Inc. enforcer Abe Reles, and by Burns' brother, Frank. According to the letter, Crater was buried near West Eighth Street in Coney Island, Brooklyn, at the current site of the New York Aquarium. Police reported that no records had been found to indicate that skeletal remains had been discovered at that site when it was excavated in the 1950s. Richard J. Tofel, the author of a 2004 book on the Crater case, Vanishing Point, expressed skepticism of Ferrucci-Good's account.

== Popular culture ==
The phrase "to pull a Judge Crater", or simply "to pull a Crater", means to disappear. It is no longer widely used. For many years following Crater's disappearance, "Judge Crater, call your office" was a standard gag of nightclub comedians. As a publicity stunt for their 1933 film Bureau of Missing Persons, First National Pictures promised in advertisements to pay Crater $10,000 (equivalent to $250,000 in 2025) if he claimed it in person at the box office. Crater's last letter, possibly written on the day of his disappearance, was sold at auction on June 22, 1981, for $700. The letter was marked "confidential" and began: "The following money is due me from the persons named. Get in touch with them for they will surely pay their debts." It was incorrectly reported that this letter was Crater's will.

The judge was popularly known amongst friends as "Good Time Joe", from his fun times with showgirls and his love for dancing. After his disappearance, the press would use this nickname as one of the common ways to refer to him, in addition to calling him the "Missingest Man in America".

== See also ==
- List of people who disappeared mysteriously: 1910–1990
