= Goldsworthy Productions =

Goldsworthy Productions was a short lived Australian film production company established by actor Reg Goldsworthy. Head of production was TV producer Warwick Freeman. They made three films directed by American Eddie Davis using American actors and Australian support cast, crew and finance. American company Commonwealth United Entertainment released the films and provided a negative pick up so all the financing was local, done through an insurance and finance company.

They also assisted in the films Squeeze a Flower (1970) and Sidecar Racers (1975).

== Select Credits ==
- It Takes All Kinds (1969)
- Color Me Dead (1970)
- That Lady from Peking (1975)

== See also ==
- List of film production companies
- List of television production companies
