= Go West, Young Man (play) =

1952 play by Maurice Francis

- Written by: Maurice Francis
- Original language: English
- Genre: farce

Premiere
- Date premiered: October 1952
- Place premiered: Monash Hut, Rose Bay

Go West, Young Man is a 1952 Australian play by Maurice Francis.

== Reception ==
The Sydney Morning Herald said "Apart from the last act, where the threads seem to be lost for a time, Mr. Francis lays out' his plot in an entertaining way, though he has obviously written too fast and too 'uncritically to make the most of some of the situations. The humour is glib, often mechanical, occasionally laboured, sometimes tasteless-as when the hero cavorts around the stage in blonde curls and satin lingerie."

ABC Weekly said "there is always room in the theatre for a good farce, and judging by the shrieks of delight I must suppose that this is one. Mr. Francis evidently believes that the safe recipe for laughter in the theatre is that there shall be a minimum of invention, with stock situa-tions, and no wit. Perhaps he is right."

The Bulletin said the farce "rattles along a familiar road in a great hurry... with a great deal of noise and shouting. "

The Sun Herald said it "has a lot of ill-considered stuff in it, but which could, with careful reconstruction and editing, move up into the "Worm's Eye View" class of theatrical inspiration."

== Premise ==
An Englishman goes to the Australian outback.

== Original 1952 cast ==
- Reginald Goldsworthy as the English hero
- Joan Landor as Fatima, an Egyptian siren
- Peter Woodruff
- William Kennard as a New Australian
- Jeanette Woodforde
- Frank Merchant
- Alex Ground
- Ruth Catts
- Graham Davis
