= Polly Adler =

American madam and author (1900–1962)

- Adler c. 1953
- Born: April 16, 1900; Yanow, Russian Empire (modern day Belarus)
- Died: June 9, 1962 (aged 62); Hollywood, California, U.S.
- Occupations: madam, author

Pearl "Polly" Adler (April 16, 1900 – June 9, 1962) was an American madam and author, best known for her work A House Is Not a Home, which was adapted into a film of the same name. In 2021, Pulitzer Prize–winning historian Debby Applegate published a comprehensive account of Adler's life and times entitled Madam: The Biography of Polly Adler, Icon of the Jazz Age with Doubleday. Adler also inspired the novel A Pair of Aces (2026) by Marie Benedict and Victoria Christopher.

== Early life ==
Of Russian-Jewish origin, Pearl Adler was the eldest of nine children of Gertrude Koval and Morris Adler, a tailor who travelled throughout Europe on business. Her early education was from the village rabbi.

The family lived at Yanow, a city of Imperial Russia, (later in western Belarus) near the Polish border. When Adler was thirteen, her parents sent her with a cousin to the United States to avoid the gathering wave of pogroms. Halfway through the journey, her cousin decided to turn back home, leaving Adler on her own.

World War I prevented the rest of her family from immigrating to the U.S. until after the end of the war. The war also prevented her from receiving the monthly allowance sent by her father. In the U.S., she lived for a time with friends of her family in Springfield, Massachusetts, where she cleaned house and attended school and, at age 14, began working in the local paper mill. The following year she moved to Brooklyn, where she lived for a time with cousins. Adler worked as a seamstress and at clothing factories, and attended school sporadically. At the age of 17, while working in a corset factory for $5 a week, she was raped by her foreman and became pregnant. She found a doctor who charged $150 for abortions. The doctor took pity on her when she said she only had $35; he accepted only $25 and told her to "take the rest and buy some shoes and stockings." Ostracized by her cousins, she moved to Manhattan and continued working in a factory.

At 19, she began to enjoy the company of theater people in Manhattan, and shared an apartment with an actress and showgirl on Riverside Drive in New York City. The street was known among Yiddish speakers as "Allrightnik’s Row", suggesting that its residents had "made it". Her new friends were involved in vaudeville, Broadway revues, Tin Pan Alley, burlesque, and the sleazy underbelly of show business. They gave her the nickname "Polly."

It was at this apartment in 1920 that Adler was introduced to Nicolas Montana, whose business was procuring women to work in brothels. Montana set her up in a furnished, two-room apartment across from Columbia University, where she soon began to procure prostitutes for Montana and his friends, earning $100 a week. One evening, Adler was arrested and charged with procuring, but the case was dismissed for lack of evidence. After a brief attempt to run a lingerie shop, she returned to prostitution, determined this time to succeed in it. She made a point of befriending the police, slipping a $100 bill into a cop's palm whenever she shook his hand.

== Bordello owner ==
As Adler's business grew, she invested in a series of improvements, moving to grander accommodations and updating the interiors where necessary.

One building in which she plied her trade was the Majestic Tower, at 215 West 75th street, designed by architects Schwartz and Gross and completed in 1931. It included a bar styled to resemble the recently excavated Tutankhamun's tomb, a Chinese Room where visitors could play mahjong, a Gobelin tapestry, hidden stairways and secret doorways.

Her brothel's patrons included Peter Arno, Harold Ross, George S. Kaufman (who had an account and paid for services rendered at the end of each month), Robert Benchley, Donald Ogden Stewart, Dorothy Parker (who would chat with Adler while her male friends partook of the girls' services), Milton Berle, John Garfield, New York City mayor Jimmy Walker, gossip columnist Walter Winchell, and mobster Dutch Schultz. There has been speculation that New York State Supreme Court justice Joseph Force Crater, who vanished on August 6, 1930, died in Adler's brothel.

Adler was a shrewd businesswoman with a mind for marketing. She determined that gaining publicity would be to her advantage, and she cultivated newspaper coverage by dressing flamboyantly, making grand appearances at nightclubs, and drawing attention to her beautiful employees. She also paid large bribes to city and law enforcement officials to keep her business open. Adler's brothels were distinguished by drink from the best bootleggers, food from her own private cooks, good hygiene, and well-selected, mostly working-class girls. It was reported that during the early days of the Great Depression, Adler had to turn away as many as forty young women for every one she hired.

In the early 1930s, Adler was a star witness of the Seabury Commission investigations and spent a few months in hiding in Florida to avoid testifying. She refused to give up the names of any mobsters when apprehended by the police.

Adler retired in 1945. She attended high school and earned an associate degree at Los Angeles City College. In 1953, she and ghost writer Virginia Faulkner published her memoir, A House Is Not a Home; it was issued by Rinehart and Co. and sold two million copies in both hard cover and mass-market paperback. Her notoriety led her to be included in Cleveland Amory's 1959 Celebrity Register. In 1964, two years after her death, A House Is Not a Home was made into a movie starring Shelley Winters as Adler.

== Trials ==
The world knew Polly as a madam, but her friends knew her as an intelligent woman, fun to be with, and a good cook.

— Milton Berle

=== Spring 1935 ===
During Fiorello La Guardia's time as a mayor, Polly Adler and three of her girls were brought to court. She pleaded guilty and was sentenced to 30 days in jail and fined $500. She served her sentence in May and June 1935, scrubbing the jail floors, and was released after 24 days.

"A plea of guilty was entered for Polly Adler in Special Sessions yesterday to a charge of possessing a 'motion picture machine with objectionable pictures' in her East Fifty-fifth Street apartment when it was raided by the police last March 5."

"Another unexpected plea of guilty to maintaining an objectionable apartment at 30 East Fifty-fifth Street blocked in Special Sessions yesterday the trial of Polly Adler on that and another charge that she kept an 'obscene motion picture film' in the suite last March when it was raided."

=== January 1943 ===
In 1943, Adler was imprisoned at the Bellevue Hospital, while under her seventeenth charge for prostitution. The case was later dismissed by Thomas H. Cullen.

== Television and film portrayals ==
Shelley Winters portrayed Adler in the 1964 film version of Adler's book. The 1989 Perry Mason TV-movie Musical Murder revolved around a faux-musical based on Adler. Adler was portrayed by the actress Gisèle Rousseau in the 1994 film Mrs. Parker and the Vicious Circle.

The television show M*A*S*H episode "Bulletin Board" features a party/picnic called the "First Annual Polly Adler Birthday Cook-out Picnic and Bar-B-Que", with all proceeds going to Sr. Teresa's Orphanage. The picnic scene climaxes with a tug of war between the officers and enlisted men. In the episode "Goodbye, Cruel World", Colonel Potter asks "Why does my company clerk's office look like Polly Adler's parlor?" after Corporal Klinger does some redecorating with items sent from home.

== Death ==
Adler died of cancer in Cedars of Lebanon Hospital in Los Angeles, California. She was survived by her mother and her six brothers. She is buried in the Maimonides section of Mt. Sinai Memorial Park in Los Angeles. There were rumors that she had left an unfinished sequel to her book.

== Autobiography ==
=== Editions ===
- Polly Adler (1953). A house is not a home. New York, Toronto: Rinehart & Co. Inc. LCCN 52012105. OL 6114335M.
- Polly Adler; Rachel Rubin (2006). A House Is Not a Home. Univ. of Massachusetts Press. ISBN 978-1-55849-559-3. LCCN 2006018584.

=== Translations ===
- Polly Adler (1964). Case chiuse. Marisa Bulgheroni, translator. Milano: A. Mondadori.
- Polly Adler: Madam P. und ihre Mädchen, Lichtenberg Verlag, München, 1965
