= The Caper of the Golden Bulls =

1967 film by Russell Rouse

- Directed by: Russell Rouse
- Screenplay by: Ed Waters; David Moessinger
- Based on: The Caper of the Golden Bulls by William P. McGivern
- Produced by: Clarence Greene
- Starring: Stephen Boyd; Yvette Mimieux; Giovanna Ralli
- Cinematography: Harold E. Stine
- Edited by: Chester W. Schaeffer; Robert Wyman
- Music by: Vic Mizzy
- Production company: Greene-Rouse Productions
- Distributed by: Embassy Pictures
- Release date: May 24, 1967
- Running time: 106 minutes
- Country: United States
- Language: English

The Caper of the Golden Bulls, also known as Carnival of Thieves, is a 1967 American action comedy film directed by Russell Rouse and starring Stephen Boyd, Yvette Mimieux and Giovanna Ralli.

== Plot ==
During a bombing mission to Germany, wartime pilot Peter Churchman (Boyd) inadvertently destroys a French cathedral. To atone, after the war, Churchman and a crew of accomplices rob a number of banks, making sure the money goes to have the cathedral rebuilt.

Churchman moves to Spain, where he opens a successful restaurant. He and another American expatriate, Grace Harvey (Mimieux), are in a romantic relationship. Life is idyllic until one day Angela Tresler (Ralli), an acquaintance from the war, turns up threatening to expose Churchman's illegal activity unless he and his crew pull off a daring robbery for her in Pamplona.

During the fiesta, Churchman's men carry concealed explosives and tools during the famed Running of the Bulls, veering off into an alley during the event. Churchman has broken into a bank and, using the dynamite, he blows open a safe, timing the explosion with a cannon's shot that is a traditional rite during the festival.

Inside the safe are rare jewels, which he hides inside a precious religious statue. Churchman turns over the statue to Angela, who is elated until she discovers the statue to be empty. Both have been outsmarted by Grace, who replaced the statue with a replica and turned over the jewels safely to Gonzalez, the town's chief of police.

== Cast ==
- Stephen Boyd as Peter Churchman
- Yvette Mimieux as Grace Harvey
- Giovanna Ralli as Angela Tresler
- Vito Scotti as Francois Morel
- J.G. Devlin as The Tinker
- Arnold Moss as Mr. Shanari
- Walter Slezak as Antonio Gonzalez
- Clifton James as Philippe
- Jay Novello as Carlos
- Henry Beckman as Bendell
- Noah Keen as The Irishman
- Leon Askin as Morchek

== Production ==
The film had location shooting in Pamplona and Madrid in Spain.

== See also ==
- List of American films of 1967
