= Sierra (film) =

1950 film

- Film poster
- Directed by: Alfred E. Green
- Written by: Milton Gunzberg (additional dialogue)
- Screenplay by: Edna Anhalt
- Based on: The Mountains Are My Kingdom; 1937 novel by Stuart Hardy
- Produced by: Michael Kraike
- Starring: Wanda Hendrix; Audie Murphy; Burl Ives; Dean Jagger
- Cinematography: Russell Metty
- Edited by: Ted J. Kent
- Music by: Walter Scharf
- Color process: Technicolor
- Production company: Universal Pictures
- Distributed by: Universal Pictures
- Release date: June 1, 1950
- Running time: 83 minutes
- Country: United States
- Language: English
- Budget: $620,000-$850,000 (est).

Sierra is a 1950 American Western film directed by Alfred E. Green and starring Wanda Hendrix, Audie Murphy and Burl Ives. The film was based on the 1937 novel The Mountains Are My Kingdom by Stuart Hardy.

== Plot ==
Jeff Hassard (Dean Jagger) and his son Ring (Audie Murphy) lead an isolated existence in the mountains breaking horses, because Jeff is wanted for a murder he did not commit. Their lives are interrupted when they stumble upon a young woman lawyer, Riley (Wanda Hendrix). When Jeff is injured, Ring has to go into town to get help.

== Cast ==
- Wanda Hendrix as Riley Martin
- Audie Murphy as Ring Hassard
- Burl Ives as Lonesome
- Dean Jagger as Jeff Hassard
- Richard Rober as Big Matt
- Tony Curtis as Brent Coulter (as Anthony Curtis)
- Houseley Stevenson as Sam Coulter
- Elliott Reid as Duke Lafferty
- Griff Barnett as Dr. Robbins
- Elisabeth Risdon as Aunt Susan
- Roy Roberts as Sheriff Knudson
- Gregg Martell as Hogan
- Sara Allgood as Mrs. Jonas
- Erskine Sanford as Judge Prentiss
- John Doucette as Jed Coulter
- James Arness as Little Sam (as Jim Arness)
- Ted Jordan as Jim Coulter
- I. Stanford Jolley as Snake Willens
- Jack Ingram as Al

== Production ==
Wanda Hendrix was billed over Audie Murphy in the credits. They were married when the film was made, however their marriage was short and tumultuous, and the two were separated before the film was even released. According to various interviews and articles on the film, Murphy was suffering from what would eventually come to be known as post-traumatic stress disorder, which resulted in his often erratic and unpredictable behavior.

Parts of the film were shot in Kanab Canyon, Aspen Mirror Lake, Duck Creek, Cascade Falls, and Cedar Breaks in Utah.
