= The Thief (1952 film) =

1952 American film noir crime film directed by Russell Rouse

- Theatrical release poster
- Directed by: Russell Rouse
- Screenplay by: Clarence Greene; Russell Rouse
- Produced by: Clarence Greene
- Starring: Ray Milland
- Cinematography: Sam Leavitt
- Edited by: Chester W. Schaeffer
- Music by: Herschel Burke Gilbert
- Production companies: Harry Popkin Productions; Fran Productions
- Distributed by: United Artists
- Release dates: October 10, 1952 (United States); October 15, 1952 (New York City)
- Running time: 86 minutes
- Country: United States
- Box office: $1 million

The Thief is a 1952 American film noir crime film directed by Russell Rouse and starring Ray Milland. The film is noted for having no spoken dialogue; the only verbal communication present in the film is represented through closeup shots of two telegrams.

== Plot ==
Dr. Allan Fields is a nuclear physicist employed by the United States Atomic Energy Commission in Washington, D.C. He is also a spy, working for an unnamed foreign power.

Through elaborate tradecraft, Fields, as ordered by his case officer, photographs secret documents, using a Minox camera, and passes these through a network of couriers to New York City, and thereafter overseas to an enemy country. The latest canister of microfilm is intercepted by authorities after the courier is killed in a traffic accident in Manhattan, with the canister of undeveloped microfilm in his hand. The FBI develops the microfilm, analyzes its contents, and draws up a list of suspects within the AEC, one of whom is the custodian of the secret document, whom Fields observes being taken away for interrogation at FBI headquarters.

The custodian is apparently cleared of espionage charges, and the FBI moves its focus to his subordinates at AEC. Fields is one of the suspects. His case officer sends him a Western Union telegram, ordering him to destroy any evidence of his espionage and to move into a safe house in New York City.

Now scared and paranoid, Fields stays overnight in the safe house, a cheap hotel. Receiving a signal from his case officer on the hotel's hall phone, he proceeds to the Empire State Building, meeting his contact, Miss Philips, on the 86th-floor observation deck. An alert FBI agent spots Fields and pursues him, first to the 102nd-floor observation deck, and then to the spire. The two men fight, and the agent falls to his death. Fields returns to the hotel to collect a package of money and false identity documents which will get him out of the country. He proceeds to the docks, where passage has been arranged for him on board a ship bound for Egypt. But shaken by the death of the agent and full of remorse for his actions, he abandons the escape plan and gives himself up to the FBI.

== Cast ==
- Ray Milland as Allan Fields (Nuclear physicist/spy)
- Martin Gabel as Mr. Bleek (Soviet agent/case officer)
- Harry Bronson as Harris (FBI agent)
- Rita Vale as Miss Philips (Soviet agent/courier)
- Rex O'Malley as Beal (Soviet agent/courier)
- Rita Gam as the Girl (MacGuffin)
- John McKutcheon as Dr. Linstrum (Fields' superior/document custodian)
- Joe Conlin as Walters

== Reaction ==
=== Critical response ===
When the film was released, A. W. Weiler, the film critic at The New York Times gave the film a good review, writing, "Clarence Greene and Russell Rouse, an enterprising pair of film artisans, are trying to prove that some movie yarns are better seen than heard. Their effort is a successful tour de force. For, generally speaking, theirs is a spy melodrama in which language would appear to be redundant ... aside from its novelty, The thief has its fair share of attributes. The fine photography of cinematographer Sam Leavitt, whose cameras have captured the lights of actual, and familiar, locations in Washington and New York, contributes strongly to the tensions of the hunt. The musical score by Herschel Gilbert is insidiously suggestive in creating atmosphere as well as indicating the emotions of the principals. And, above all, Russell Rouse, who also directed, has gotten a sensitive and towering performance from Ray Milland in the title role."

The staff at Variety magazine reviewed the film positively. They wrote, "This has an offbeat approach to film story-telling (a complete absence of dialog), a good spy plot and a strong performance by Ray Milland. The film is not soundless. The busy hum of a city is a cacophonous note, a strident-sounding telephone bell plays an important part and, overall, there’s the topnotch musical score by Herschel Burke Gilbert, sometimes used almost too insistently to build a melodramatic mood and in other spots softly emphasizing and making clear the dumb action of the players."

More recently, film critic Dennis Schwartz gave the film a mixed review. He wrote, "Russell Rouse (The Oscar) directs and co-writes this unique but tedious spy/Red Scare thriller set in New York City ... What we get is a tense mood piece through the excellent dark visuals delivered by cinematographer Sam Leavitt. It shows a lonely and alienated unsympathetic man on-the-run, who is trapped in a shadowy world of chaos but is not fleshed out in his character so we never become concerned with his plight as a human interest story."

=== Accolades ===
Year	Award/Category	Recipient	Result
Academy Awards
1953	Best Music, Scoring of a Dramatic or Comedy Picture	Herschel Burke Gilbert	Nominated
Golden Globe Awards
1953	Best Cinematography - Black and White	Sam Leavitt	Nominated
1953	Best Motion Picture - Drama		Nominated
1953	Best Motion Picture Actor - Drama	Ray Milland	Nominated
1953	Best Screenplay	Clarence Greene, Russell Rouse	Nominated
1953	Most Promising Newcomer - Female	Rita Gam	Nominated
