= Eddie Davis (director) =

American film director

Eddie Davis (born January 1903 in New York, NY, date of death unknown) was an American film director who worked extensively in television.

In the late 1960s he made three films in Australia for Goldsworthy Productions, whose head of production, Warwick Freeman, described Davis as a "nice guy and he taught us all a lot about the rudiments of production."

== Select credits ==
- Panic in the City (1968)
- It Takes All Kinds (1969)
- Color Me Dead (1970) aka D.O.A. II
- That Lady from Peking (1971; filmed in 1969)
