= Tightrope! =

American television series 1959-1960

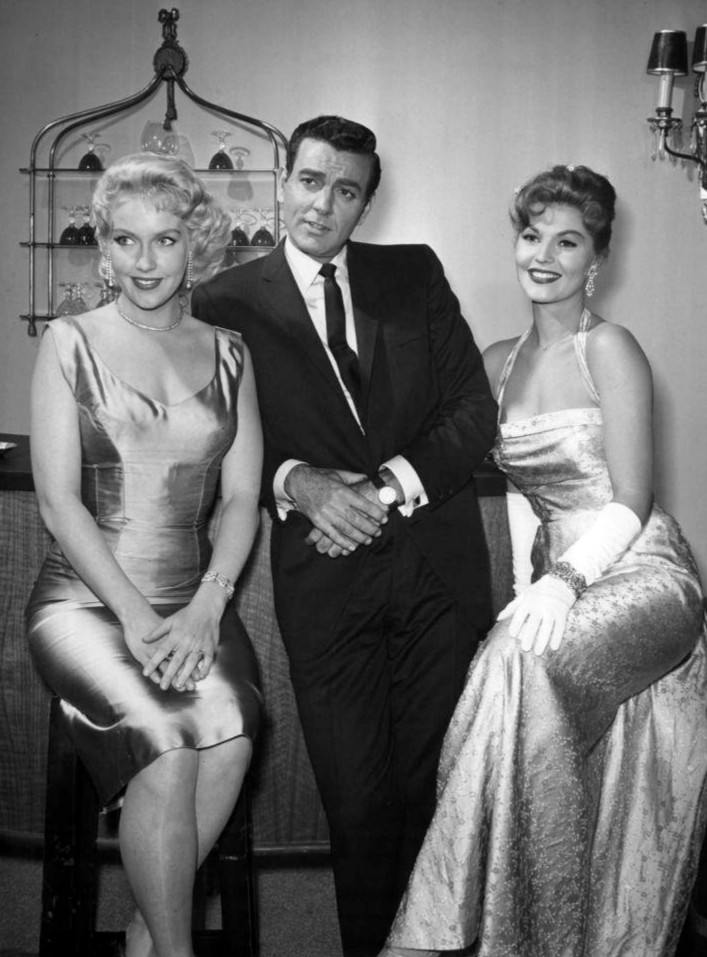
- Mike Connors with Leigh Snowden (left) and Claire Kelly, 1960
- Genre: Crime drama
- Created by: Clarence Greene; Russell Rouse
- Written by: Frederick Brady; Berne Giler; Clarence Greene; Steven Ritch; Russell Rouse; Al C. Ward
- Directed by: Abner Biberman; Irving J. Moore; Russell Rouse; Oscar Rudolph
- Starring: Mike Connors
- Theme music composer: George Duning
- Opening theme: Vic Schoen & Orchestra
- Country of origin: United States
- Original language: English
- No. of seasons: 1
- No. of episodes: 37 (all filmed in black-and-white)

Production
- Producers: Clarence Greene; Russell Rouse
- Cinematography: Scotty Welbourne
- Camera setup: Single-camera
- Running time: 22–24 minutes
- Production companies: Greene-Rouse Productions; Screen Gems

Original release
- Network: CBS
- Release: September 8, 1959 – September 13, 1960

Tightrope! is an American crime drama series that aired on CBS from September 1959 to September 1960, under the alternating sponsorship of the J. B. Williams Company (Aqua Velva, Lectric Shave, etc.), and American Tobacco (Pall Mall). Produced by Russell Rouse and Clarence Greene in association with Screen Gems, the series stars Mike Connors as an undercover agent named "Nick" who was assigned to infiltrate criminal gangs. The show was originally to have been titled Undercover Man, but it was changed before going to air. Actor Robert Phillips, a former Los Angeles undercover policeman and US Marine, claimed the show was based on his exploits, but that he was not chosen to portray himself.

== Synopsis ==
Mike Connors' character narrated the episode, echoing film noir technique. He starred as an undercover police officer, known only as "Nick" (although some sources revealed that his last name was "Stone", his last name was never shown in the series' ending credits). Only his immediate superior on the police force knew he was working undercover. Because the police often did not know that Nick was working for the law, he was often in danger from both the good guys and the bad guys, as he walked the "tightrope" between good and evil. A special gimmick was that in addition to a gun in a shoulder holster, he carried a second gun, a snubnosed revolver, in a holster behind his back; he was often searched by both cops and bad guys, but they stopped searching after finding the first gun.

== Episodes ==
No.	Title	Directed by	Written by	Original release date
1	"Getaway Day"	Russell Rouse	Russell Rouse & Clarence Greene	September 8, 1959
2	"The Casino"	Russell Rouse	Russell Rouse & Clarence Greene	September 15, 1959
3	"The Frame"	Abner Biberman	Story by : Robert Bloomfield; Teleplay by : Tony Barrett	September 22, 1959
4	"Stand on Velvet"	Abner Biberman	Stirling Silliphant	September 29, 1959
5	"The Cracking Point"	Abner Biberman	Frederic Brady	October 6, 1959
6	"Thousand Dollar Bill"	Abner Biberman	Al C. Ward	October 13, 1959
7	"Music and Mink"	Russell Rouse	Russell Rouse & Clarence Greene	October 20, 1959
8	"Man in the Middle"	Abner Biberman	Frederic Brady	November 3, 1959
9	"The Patsy"	Abner Biberman	Berne Giler	November 10, 1959
10	"The Money Fight"	Abner Biberman	Al C. Ward	November 17, 1959
11	"Black Tie Kill"	Unknown	Unknown	November 24, 1959
12	"The Perfect Circle"	Abner Biberman	Tony Barrett	December 1, 1959
13	"The Lady"	Abner Biberman	Al C. Ward	December 8, 1959
14	"Cold Kill"	Unknown	Unknown	December 15, 1959
15	"The Neon Wheel"	Irving J. Moore	Frederic Brady	December 22, 1959
16	"Two Private Eyes"	Don Taylor	Frederic Brady	December 29, 1959
17	"Night of the Gun"	Paul Wendkos	Frederic Brady	January 5, 1960
18	"Broken Rope"	Irving J. Moore	Frederic Brady	January 12, 1960
19	"Cold Ice"	John Rich	Tony Barrett	January 19, 1960
20	"Appointment in Jericho"	Abner Biberman	Stirling Silliphant	January 26, 1960
21	"Three to Make Ready"	Irving J. Moore	Steven Ritch	February 2, 1960
22	"The Model and the Mobster"	Irving J. Moore	Frederic Brady	February 9, 1960
23	"The Long Odds"	Oscar Rudolph	Frederic Brady	February 16, 1960
24	"The Brave Pigeon"	Irving J. Moore	Steven Ritch	February 23, 1960
25	"First Time Out"	Unknown	Unknown	March 1, 1960
26	"Park Avenue Story"	Unknown	Unknown	March 8, 1960
27	"Big Business"	Oscar Rudolph	George Bruce	March 15, 1960
28	"The Chinese Pendant"	Irving J. Moore	Steven Ritch	March 29, 1960
29	"Achilles and His Heels"	Irving J. Moore	Frederic Brady	April 5, 1960
30	"The Gangster's Daughter"	Irving J. Moore	Kitty Buhler	April 12, 1960
31	"The Penthouse Story"	Irving J. Moore	Sidney Marshall	April 19, 1960
32	"The Shark"	Sidney Miller	Berne Giler	April 26, 1960
33	"The Horse Runs High"	Oscar Rudolph	Steven Ritch	May 3, 1960
34	"The Hired Guns"	Reginald Le Borg	Frederic Brady	May 10, 1960
35	"Borderline"	Irving J. Moore	Al C. Ward	May 17, 1960
36	"A Matter of Money"	Unknown	Unknown	May 24, 1960
37	"Bullets and Ballet"	Allen H. Miner	Steven Ritch	May 31, 1960

== Guest stars ==
- Rico Alaniz
- Jack Albertson
- Robert Anderson
- Raymond Bailey
- Barbara Bain
- Whit Bissell
- Madge Blake
- Whitney Blake
- Neville Brand
- Paul Burke
- Jean Byron
- Jeanne Carmen as Francie Verlaine
- Anthony Caruso
- Mary Castle
- James Chandler
- Russ Conway
- Ellen Corby
- Jerome Cowan
- Walter Coy
- Dennis Cross
- Donna Douglas
- Jack Elam
- Ross Elliott
- Douglas Fowley
- Bruce Gordon
- Dabbs Greer
- Ron Hagerthy
- Myron Healey
- Connie Hines
- Richard Jaeckel
- L.Q. Jones
- Brett King
- Lou Krugman
- John Larch
- Ruta Lee
- Barton MacLane
- John Marley
- Ann McCrea
- Ed Nelson
- Simon Oakland
- John M. Pickard
- Stuart Randall
- Mike Road
- Madlyn Rhue
- Doris Singleton
- Olan Soule
- Karl Swenson
- William Tannen
- Kent Taylor
- George Tobias
- Jesse White

== Cancellation ==
Despite the show's popularity, it was canceled after only one season. Mike Connors stated in an interview that the show's primary sponsor (J. B. Williams) refused the network's request to move it to a later timeslot on a different day. When CBS head James Aubrey stated that the show was indisputably going to move timeslot, the sponsor dropped Tightrope!, and underwrote another program on another network. Connors also did not agree with suggested changes to the show's format, that would have extended its length to one hour and added a sidekick, to be played by Don Sullivan. He thought such an alteration would eliminate the suspense element of the program. Yet another factor in the show's eventual cancellation were complaints concerning its alleged excessive violence.

Seven years later, Connors would go on to star in the successful, long-running CBS crime series Mannix.

== Reboot ==
A 1972 TV-movie, Man on a String, starred Christopher George as Pete King, a deep cover cop infiltrating organized crime. It was reported by some sources as a reimagining of Tightrope!, but despite the similar backstory, and a title that evoked the earlier series, nothing in the credits suggested that the earlier show was the source material for the film, which, though intended as a pilot, did not go to series.

In April 2024, Roku announced it has greenlit a reboot of the show in the form of a slapstick comedy starring Modern Family's Ty Burrell with Bryan Cranston as Executive Producer. This is similar to what ABC and the writers of Airplane! did in 1982 with Police Squad!, a spoof of M Squad.
