= The Well (1951 film) =

1951 film by Russell Rouse

- Theatrical release poster
- Directed by: Leo C. Popkin; Russell Rouse
- Screenplay by: Clarence Greene; Russell Rouse
- Produced by: Clarence Greene; Leo C. Popkin
- Starring: Richard Rober; Maidie Norman
- Cinematography: Ernest Laszlo
- Edited by: Chester Schaeffer
- Music by: Dimitri Tiomkin
- Production companies: Cardinal Pictures; Harry Popkin Productions
- Distributed by: United Artists
- Release dates: September 26, 1951 (New York); October 25, 1951 (Los Angeles)
- Running time: 86 minutes
- Country: United States
- Language: English
- Budget: $450,000

The Well is a 1951 American drama film directed by Leo C. Popkin and Russell Rouse and starring Richard Rober and Maidie Norman. It tackles the issues of racial tensions and collective behavior. Produced on a modest budget with a cast that includes some unknown actors, the film was nominated for two Academy Awards, including Best Original Screenplay and Best Film Editing.

== Plot ==
Five-year-old black girl Carolyn falls into an abandoned, overgrown well while picking flowers on her way to school. Her parents seek assistance from sheriff Ben Kellogg. Carolyn's disappearance causes anger and confusion in the community, and rumors quickly spread among both the white and black populations when white stranger Claude Packard is arrested on suspicion of involvement in Carolyn's disappearance.

A mining engineer named Claude is in town visiting his uncle Sam Packard, a well-known businessman, who attempts to use his influence to release his nephew from police custody. This inflames the racial tension further, and when Sam is accosted by Carolyn's relatives outside the police station, he suffers a heart attack, which is reported among the white population as a racial attack. Tensions mount as various gangs of black and white residents begin attacking each other. The sheriff requests that the mayor order state assistance to quell the potentially serious disturbances and readies voluntary deputies to disperse the growing white mob at Sam's warehouse.

Before events can spiral completely out of control, Carolyn is found alive in the well but cannot be easily extracted. It takes the efforts of Sam's construction crew to sink a parallel shaft and Claude's expertise to rescue her.

== Cast ==
- Richard Rober as Sheriff Ben Kellogg
- Gwendolyn Laster as Carolyn Crawford
- Maidie Norman as Martha Crawford
- Barry Kelley as Sam Packard (as Barry Kelly)
- Harry Morgan as Claude Packard
- Tom Powers as the Mayor
- Robert Osterloh as Wylie
- Christine Larson as Casey
- George Hamilton as Grandpa Peabody
- Ernest Anderson as Ralph Crawford
- Dick Simmons as Deputy Mickey McClure

== Production ==
The film was developed under the working title Deep is the Well. The script was based on the real-life case of Kathy Fiscus, who fell into a pipe in an abandoned oil field in 1949 and died before she could be rescued. Billy Wilder was reportedly interested in bringing the story to the screen, but producer Harry M. Popkin seized the opportunity first. Wilder later directed Ace in the Hole (1951), a film that centers on the rescue of a man trapped in a cave. The 1950 film Three Secrets was also inspired by the Fiscus incident.

The script writers researched and incorporated factual material from race riots that had erupted in American cities, such as the 1943 Detroit race riot that claimed 34 lives.

According to the Chicago Tribune, the film was the first successful screenwriting effort for Russell Rouse and Clarence Greene, as they were involved throughout the production, also assisting with direction.

The film was produced on a modest budget of $450,000 and largely features unknown actors, with the exception of Richard Rober, Harry Morgan, Tom Powers and Barry Kelly.

Location filming took place in Marysville and Grass Valley, California, with studio sets at the Motion Picture Center Studio in Hollywood.

== Release ==
The Well was released in the United States on September 10, 1951. Its planned premiere in Cincinnati in October 1951 was delayed when the Ohio Film Censor Board informed the distributor, United Artists, that its deliberations were complicated because of "the presence of Negro characters in the plot". The board finally approved the film in February 1952.

== Reception ==
In a contemporary review for the Los Angeles Times, critic Edwin Schallert wrote:

A picture of sensational value and high intensity, "The Well" ... is still another production assuring audiences of a strenuous. and in this instance an exciting experience. It is a remarkable portrayal of mob psychology ... The rescue operation in "The Well" has such conviction from a technical standpoint, and such amazing suspense that it deserves to be recorded as one of the outstanding screen achievements during the year. It evidences that the multiple producer-director-writer combination had a rare capacity for creating a tremendous illusion of reality. Audiences will definitely be on the edge of their seats in the theater while it is in progress. The early portion of the picture exploits the issue of mob violence with a fierceness that has seldom been equaled in the film theater. ... It flashes a tremendous kaleidoscope of human emotions. It has a singular polish and finish for what might be described as a new effort. It is even likely to bid for Academy interest in certain departments. ... Too many pictures of this type naturally will not be welcomed but "The Well" clearly deserves attention.

Critic Bosley Crowther of The New York Times wrote:

A taut and absorbing exposition of human compassion and energy brought to bear upon a critical job of rescuing a little girl from an abandoned well impels to a pulse-quickening climax a middling social drama ... Prejudice and antagonism are arbitrarily and recklessly assumed and portrayed in a manner which appears less calculated to understand society than to create an effect. And then, when it is discovered that the missing child is at the bottom of an abandoned well, the authors have swiftly relaxed the racial tension just as arbitrarily as they have turned it on.

== Awards ==
Nominations

- Academy Awards: Best Film Editing (Chester W. Schaeffer); Best Original Screenplay (Clarence Greene and Russell Rouse)
- Golden Globes: Best Motion Picture Score (Dimitri Tiomkin)
- Writers Guild of America: The Robert Meltzer Award (Russell Rouse and Clarence Greene)

The film won a special midseason citation from the Foreign Language Press Film Critics Circle.

== Home media ==
The film was released as a Region 1 DVD by Image Entertainment on February 20, 2007.
