= D.O.A. (1988 film) =

1988 film by Rocky Morton, Annabel Jankel

- Theatrical release poster
- Directed by: Rocky Morton; Annabel Jankel
- Screenplay by: Charles Edward Pogue
- Story by: Charles Edward Pogue; Russell Rouse; Clarence Greene
- Based on: D.O.A. by: Rudolph Maté; Russell Rouse; Clarence Greene
- Produced by: Ian Sander; Laura Ziskin
- Starring: Dennis Quaid; Meg Ryan; Daniel Stern; Charlotte Rampling
- Cinematography: Yuri Neyman
- Edited by: Raja Gosnell; Michael R. Miller
- Music by: Chaz Jankel
- Production companies: Touchstone Pictures; Silver Screen Partners III
- Distributed by: Buena Vista Pictures Distribution
- Release date: March 18, 1988
- Running time: 97 minutes
- Country: United States
- Language: English
- Budget: $3.5 million
- Box office: $12.7 million

D.O.A. is a 1988 American neo-noir film directed by Rocky Morton and Annabel Jankel. A remake of the 1950 film of the same name, it stars Dennis Quaid, Meg Ryan and Charlotte Rampling, and was filmed in Austin, Texas and San Marcos, Texas. It was theatrically released in the United States on March 18, 1988, to mixed reviews.

== Plot ==
College Professor Dexter Cornell staggers into a police station to report his own murder. He recounts the past thirty-six hours.

Once a promising writer, Dex made his name and is secure in his tenure, but he has spent the last four years going through the motions and playing it safe. Dex helps his friend Hal Petersham with his first book. While celebrating with Scotch, Hal notices Dex gave an "A" to a manuscript by a promising student, Nick Lang, and is incensed when Dex says he never read the manuscript.

While Dex is in his office, Nick drops off the building in an apparent suicide. This, coupled with the depressing Christmas season, unseasonably hot weather, and a pending divorce from his estranged wife, Gail, whom he suspects was having an affair with Nick, leads Dex to seek out the local bars for a night of heavy drinking. There he runs into admiring student Sydney Fuller.

The next morning, Dex calls Gail. She tells him he left his briefcase behind, and admits to the affair with Nick, which she says was a one-off, and she did not find out he was Dex's student until later. Feeling his sickness is more than just a hangover, Dex stops by the campus medical clinic. After running some tests, they discover that he has been poisoned and has 24–48 hours to live. An incredulous Dex staggers to Gail's house and witnesses her being murdered by an obscured figure before he faints from the sedative the clinic administered to calm him.

Police, having discovered scuff marks on the roof proving Nick was pushed to his death, arrest Dex on suspicion of having murdered both Gail and Nick out of jealousy over the affair, but he escapes.

Aided by Sydney, whom he kidnaps by super-gluing himself to her arm, he attempts to deduce who murdered him. Graham Corey, a jealous co-worker, is Dex's only enemy, and he has an airtight alibi for the time of Gail's murder, so Sydney turns the question to who would want to murder Nick. Nick's father was a burglar who killed the wealthy Mr. Fitzwaring during a break-in, then was killed in a scuffle with Bernard, the Fitzwarings' chauffeur. The Fitzwaring widow was paying for Nick's college tuition. At Nick's funeral Fitzwaring's irresponsible daughter, Cookie, reveals her love affair with Nick and insinuates that Fitzwaring disapproved. Dex confronts Cookie and Bernard with his suspicions that Fitzwaring murdered Nick. Bernard knocks him out, ties him up, and drives him to the tar pits for disposal. Finding Dex's suspicions credible, Cookie intervenes. The resulting skirmish results in Cookie and Bernard's deaths.

Imminent death causes Dex to reexamine his life, and he realizes that by giving up on taking risks, he stopped living. He reembraces life by pushing aside his reservations about the ethics of student-teacher relations and having sex with Sydney. He leaves her a goodbye note while she sleeps.

Dex confronts Fitzwaring, convinced she had Bernard kill Nick. Fitzwaring reveals that Nick was her son from a previous marriage she walked away from to marry her wealthy husband, without actually divorcing her first spouse. When the elder Lang tried to blackmail the Fitzwarings, Mr. Fitzwaring threatened to cut her off from Cookie. Mrs. Fitzwaring shot both men to silence them and thereby protect her children from scandal. Bernard concocted the burglary story. She opposed Cookie and Nick's romance because it would have been unintentional incest. With both her children dead, Fitzwaring commits suicide.

Back at his office, Dex notices a green sediment in the mug of Scotch he had with Hal. Confronted with this, Hal confesses to the poisoning. He had read and was so impressed by Nick Lang's manuscript that he decided to plagiarize the novel. He had to kill anyone who knew that Nick was the author, and did not know Dex had not read it until after poisoning him. He broke into Gail's house to burn the manuscript Dex left inside his briefcase; Gail caught him, so he murdered her. Dex threatens Hal with a gun he retrieved from Bernard. After a scuffle, Dex shoots Hal dead.

Dex finishes his statement and leaves the police station.

== Cast ==
- Dennis Quaid as Professor Dexter Cornell
- Meg Ryan as Sydney Fuller
- Daniel Stern as Hal Petersham
- Elizabeth Arlen as Dr. Elaine Wells
- Charlotte Rampling as Mrs. Fitzwaring
- Jane Kaczmarek as Gail Cornell
- Christopher Neame as Bernard
- Robin Johnson as "Cookie" Fitzwaring
- Robert Knepper as Nicholas Lang
- Brion James as Detective Ulmer
- Jack Kehoe as Detective Brockton
- Jay Patterson as Graham Corey
- John Hawkes as Sloane

== Reception ==
=== Box office ===
D.O.A. debuted at No. 3 at the US box office. By the end of its run, the film earned a total of $12.7 million in domestic sales.

=== Critical response ===
On Rotten Tomatoes, it has an approval rating of 64% based on 22 reviews. Audiences surveyed by CinemaScore gave the film a grade "B−" on scale of A to F.

Film critic Roger Ebert gave the film three stars out of four, calling it a "witty and literate thriller". Caryn James of The New York Times called it "one of the season's biggest disappointments".
