= The Town Went Wild =

1944 film by Ralph Murphy

- Directed by: Ralph Murphy
- Written by: Bernard B. Roth (story and screenplay) and Clarence Greene (story and screenplay) and Russell Rouse (story and screenplay)
- Produced by: Clarence Greene; Bernard B. Roth; Russell Rouse
- Starring: Freddie Bartholomew; Jill Browning; Jimmy Lydon
- Cinematography: Philip Tannura
- Edited by: Thomas Neff
- Music by: Gerard Carbonara
- Distributed by: Producers Releasing Corporation
- Release date: December 15, 1944
- Running time: 77 minutes
- Country: United States
- Language: English

The Town Went Wild is a 1944 American comedy film directed by Ralph Murphy and starring Freddie Bartholomew and Edward Everett Horton.

== Plot ==
Like Romeo and Juliet, next door neighbours David Conway and Carol Harrison are deeply in love with each other though their fathers have been feuding for a lifetime. With David due to go to the Alaskan Territory for engineering work for the United States Government, the pair decide to elope. David gets his best friend, Carol's brother Bob to witness their wedding at a Justice of the Peace in a neighbouring town using Millie, who has an infatuation with Bob to drive them to the town in her car and act as another witness.

Arriving at the Justice of the Peace, their wedding has to be delayed as state law requires the couple to post banns of marriage in the local newspaper for three days prior to the wedding. Returning to their own town, David prepares the banns to be published as soon as possible and goes to the local town hall to obtain his birth certificate for his government posting. The clerks discover that due to the fathers of Bob and David fighting when the children were born, the two infants were mixed at the hospital with David being a Harrison and Bob being a Conway. Not only is Carol set to marry her brother, but the intention to do so faces a fifteen year prison sentence.

== Cast ==
- Freddie Bartholomew as David Conway
- Jimmy Lydon as Bob Harrison
- Edward Everett Horton as Everett Conway
- Tom Tully as Henry Harrison
- Jill Browning as Carol Harrison
- Minna Gombell as Marian Harrison
- Maude Eburne as Judge Bingle
- Charles Halton as Mr. Tweedle
- Ruth Lee as Lucille Conway
- Roberta Smith as Millie Walker
- Ferris Taylor as Mr. Walker
- Jimmy Conlin as Lemuel Jones, Justice of the Peace
- Monte Collins as Oscar, Public Defender
- Olin Howland in a bit part
- Charles Middleton as Sam, Midvale District Attorney
- Emmett Lynn as The Watchman
- Dorothy Vaughan as Nurse Irma Reeves
