= Richard Rober =

American actor (1910–1952)

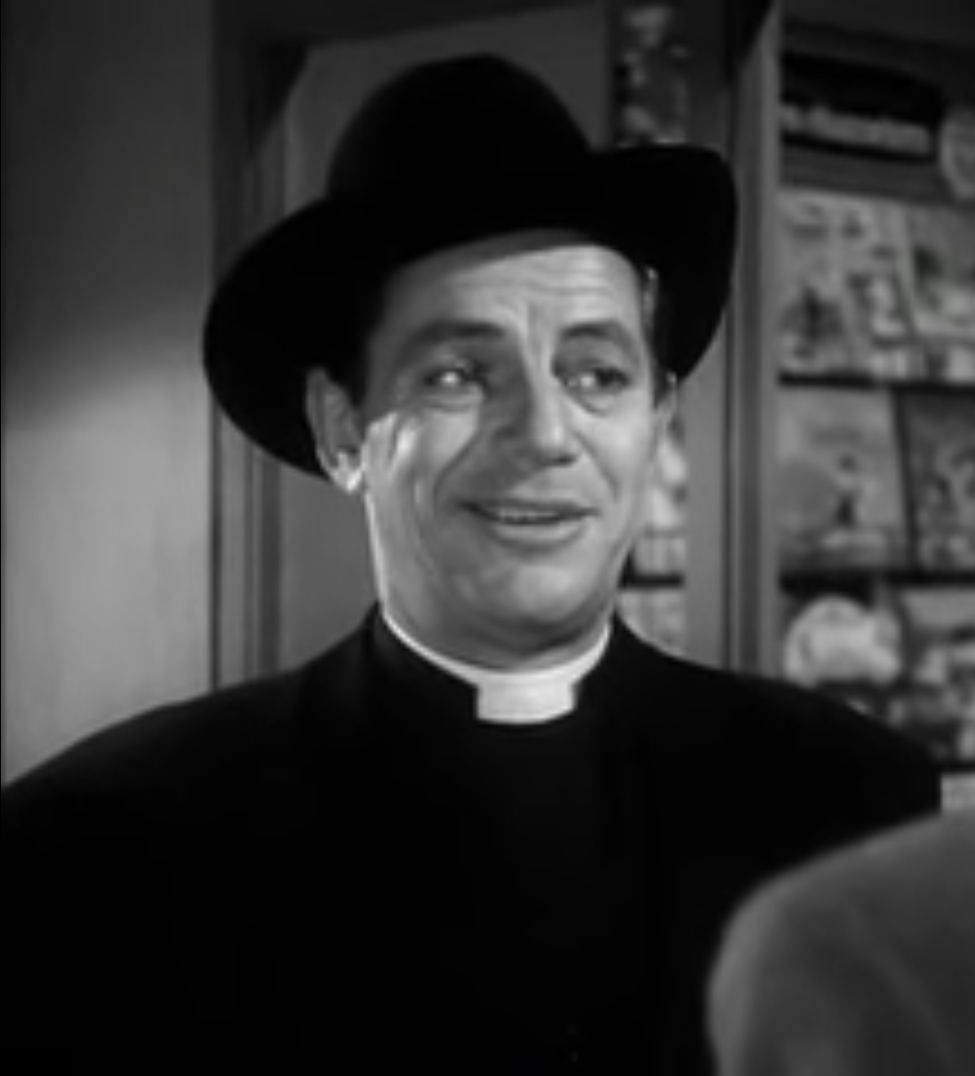
- Rober in Kid Monk Baroni (1952)
- Born: Richard Steven Rauber; May 14, 1906; Rochester, New York, U.S.
- Died: May 26, 1952 (aged 46); Santa Monica, California, U.S.
- Resting place: Holy Sepulchre Cemetery, Rochester, New York
- Occupation: Actor
- Years active: 1936–1952
- Spouse(s): Mary Hay Barthelmess (m. 1946; div. 19??)

Richard Rober (born Richard Steven Rauber; May 14, 1906 – May 26, 1952) was an American stage and film actor. From the mid-1930s to the mid-1940s he featured in numerous theatre productions, including being part of the original cast of Born Yesterday in Chicago, and the long-running Oklahoma!. In 1947 he moved to Hollywood and appeared in dozens of B-movies and film noir-type films, including Call Northside 777 (1948), Sierra (1950), and The Well (1951). He died in an automobile accident in 1952 at the age of 46.

== Early life and family ==
Richard Steven Rauber was born in Rochester, New York, on May 14, 1906. He was the son of Frederick S. Rauber, an attorney, and Elizabeth Ford.

== Career ==
Rober began his career as a stage actor in the mid-1930s under his real name, Richard Rauber. Penniless and looking for work after his graduation from the University of Rochester, he landed a small part in a play by the Lyceum Players starring Louis Calhern. He went on to act with nearly every repertory theatre company on the East Coast. He was part of the original Chicago company of Born Yesterday. He also performed in the long-running Oklahoma!.

In 1947, Rober embarked on a career in Hollywood, appearing in his first film role in Call Northside 777 (1948). He appeared in many B-movies—including Sierra (1950)—and film noir drama films such as The File on Thelma Jordon (1950) and The Well (1951). In July 1951 it was reported that he had appeared in 26 films in his 3 1/2 years in Hollywood.

While Rober mostly played supporting roles, his career began to go on the ascendancy before his death in 1952. He had a starring role in The Well (1951), and had traveled to Austria to play the lead in the MGM production The Devil Makes Three (1952). The week before his death, he played the lead in Corny Johnson, a television film produced by Bing Crosby Enterprises.

== Personal life ==
Rober was married twice. His second marriage, at age 40, was to Mary Hay Barthelmess, age 23, daughter of actors Richard Barthelmess and Mary Hay, in New York in January 1946. They later divorced.

== Death ==
Rober died after crashing his car in the San Fernando Valley on May 26, 1952. He had been driving with a passenger, actress Norma Britton. The car swerved off the highway in heavy fog and plummeted over a 75 ft (23 m) embankment, something which, three years earlier, in The File on Thelma Jordon, he actually depicted, sitting next to Barbara Stanwyck. Rescuers took the pair to Santa Monica Hospital, where Rober died a few hours later. Britton survived with rib injuries.

Rober was eulogized in Rochester and buried in the Holy Sepulchre Cemetery.

== Filmography ==
Year	Title	Role	Notes
1936	Sheik to Sheik	Ali Bin Whoopsie, the Mad Sheik	Short (credited as Richard Rauber)
1948	Call Northside 777	Sgt. Larson in Records Department	Uncredited
1948	April Showers	Al Wilson	
1948	Embraceable You	Sig Ketch	
1948	Larceny	Max	
1948	Smart Girls Don't Talk	Lt. McReady	
1949	Illegal Entry	Dutch Lempo	
1949	Any Number Can Play	Lew 'Angie' Debretti	
1949	Task Force	Jack Southern	
1949	The Woman on Pier 13	Jim Travers	
1949	Port of New York	Jim Flannery	
1950	The File on Thelma Jordon	Tony Laredo	
1950	Backfire	Solly Blayne	
1950	Sierra	Big Matt Rango	
1950	Deported	Bernardo Gervaso	
1950	Dial 1119	Police Capt. Henry Keiver	Also known as The Violent Hour in the UK
1950	Watch the Birdie	Mr. Hugh Shanway	
1951	Father's Little Dividend	Police Sergeant	
1951	Passage West	Mike	Also known as High Venture in the UK
1951	The Tall Target	Lt. Coulter	
1951	The Well	Sheriff Ben Kellogg	
1951	Man in the Saddle	Fay Dutcher	
1952	Outlaw Women	Woody Callaway	
1952	Kid Monk Baroni	Father Callahan	
1952	O. Henry's Full House	Chief of Detectives	(segment "The Clarion Call")
1952	The Rose Bowl Story	Coach James Hadley	
1952	The Savage	Capt. Arnold Vaugant	
1952	The Devil Makes Three	Colonel James Terry	
1957	Jet Pilot	FBI Agent George Rivers	Delayed release, final film role

== Stage credits ==
Year	Title	Role	Notes
1936	Murder in the Old Red Barn	William Corder	
1938	Richard II	Lord Ross	
1938	The Man from Cairo	Janos	
1941-2	Banjo Eyes	Harry the Bartender	
1942-3	Star and Garter	Narrator, District Attorney, Doctor	
1943-8	Oklahoma!		
1944	Ramshackle Inn	Dr. Russell	
1946	Born Yesterday		

== Sources ==
- Blum, Daniel C. (1951). Theatre World – Season 1951–1952. Crown Publishing Company.
- Dietz, Dan (2010). Off Broadway Musicals, 1910–2007: Casts, Credits, Songs, Critical Reception and Performance Data of More Than 1,800 Shows. McFarland. ISBN 978-0786457311.
- Mantle, Burns (1938). Burns Mantle Yearbook. Vol. 19.
- Wilson, Scott (2016). Resting Places: The Burial Sites of More Than 14,000 Famous Persons. McFarland. ISBN 9780786479924.
