= The Fastest Gun Alive =

1956 film by Russell Rouse

- Theatrical release poster
- Directed by: Russell Rouse
- Screenplay by: Frank D. Gilroy; Russell Rouse
- Based on: "The Last Notch"; 1954 teleplay by Frank D. Gilroy
- Produced by: Clarence Greene
- Starring: Glenn Ford; Jeanne Crain; Broderick Crawford; Russ Tamblyn; Allyn Joslyn
- Cinematography: George J. Folsey
- Edited by: Harry V. Knapp; Ferris Webster
- Music by: André Previn
- Production company: Metro-Goldwyn-Mayer
- Distributed by: Loew's Inc.
- Release date: April 12, 1956 (United States)
- Running time: 89 minutes
- Country: United States
- Language: English
- Budget: $1,383,000
- Box office: $3,535,000

The Fastest Gun Alive is a 1956 American Western film directed by Russell Rouse and starring Glenn Ford, Jeanne Crain, and Broderick Crawford. It was produced by Metro-Goldwyn-Mayer.

== Plot ==
George Kelby Jr. (Glenn Ford), son of a notorious "fast gun", moves to the quiet town of Cross Creek with his wife, Dora (Jeanne Crain), both under assumed identities. Now known as George Temple, he runs a general store, portraying himself as a mild-mannered, unarmed shopkeeper. He told Dora that he discarded his gun long ago, but unbeknownst to her, he secretly practices his shooting skills.

Trouble begins when news spreads that Vinnie Harold (Broderick Crawford), a feared gunman, has killed Clint Fallon (Walter Coy), reputedly the "fastest draw in the west". Saloon discussions of legendary gunfighters prompt George to reveal his intimate knowledge of guns and bold claim of being faster than lawmen Fallon, Harold, and Wyatt Earp. No one believes that the shopkeeper is capable of such skill.

Emboldened by their disbelief, George retrieves his hidden gun, revealing to Dora that he never threw it away. Ignoring her pleas to let the matter rest, George declares: "They think I just sell dresses and candy … They’ve got to know who I am." George Kelby Jr., "The Fastest Gun Alive", returns and proves his prowess by performing impressive feats of marksmanship, leaving the townsfolk awestruck.

The situation escalates when Harold and his gang arrive in Cross Creek. Hearing about George's display of skill, Harold becomes fixated on challenging him, despite being pursued by a posse, and threatens to burn the town to the ground if George does not face him. George confesses to the townspeople that he has never been in a gunfight and is terrified of facing Harold, but with no alternative is forced to face him in a showdown.

When the posse arrives in town, they find the townspeople burying both fighters. The townsfolk report that the men killed each other in the shootout.

After the posse leaves, though, the truth is revealed: George survived. The townspeople buried a coffin filled with stones along with George's gun, allowing him to shed his infamous legacy and return to a quiet life with Dora in Cross Creek.

== Cast ==
Credited are:

- Glenn Ford as George Temple / George Kelby Jr.
- Jeanne Crain as Dora Temple
- Broderick Crawford as Vinnie Harold
- Russ Tamblyn as Eric Doolittle
- Allyn Joslyn as Harvey Maxwell
- Leif Erickson as Lou Glover
- John Dehner as Taylor Swope
- Noah Beery Jr. as Dink Wells
- J. M. Kerrigan as Kevin McGovern
- Rhys Williams as Brian Tibbs
- Virginia Gregg as Rose Tibbs
- Chubby Johnson as Frank Stringer
- John Doucette as Ben Buddy
- William Phillips as Lars Toomey
- Chris Olsen as Bobby Tibbs
- Paul Birch as Sheriff Bill Toledo
- Florenz Ames as Joe Fenwick
- Joseph Sweeney as Reverend

Notable uncredited actors are:

- Glenn Strange as Sheriff in Silver Rapids
- Kermit Maynard as Silver Rapids Deputy
- Dub Taylor as Nolan Brown
- Kenneth MacDonald as Roebel
- Louis Jean Heydt as Myron Spink
- John Dierkes as Walter Hutchins
- Addison Richards as Doc Jennings
- Walter Coy as Clint Fallon
- Jeri Weil as Linda Hutchins
- Buddy Roosevelt as a barfly
- Walter Baldwin as a blind man

== Production ==
The film was based on a March 30, 1954 episode of The United States Steel Hour directed by Alex Segal starring Harry Bellaver and Royal Dano.

Russ Tamblyn, who had gained renown for his energetic dancing in MGM's Seven Brides for Seven Brothers (1954), performs a dance routine during a hoedown early in the film that includes a "shovel" dance, i.e. dancing on shovels used as stilts.

Roderick "Rodd" Redwing was Glenn Ford's gun coach and technical advisor for this film. Gun tricks were developed by Rodd Redwing with help from Jim Martin, a four-time California Fast Draw record holder.

Demonstrating his prowess with a gun, the Glenn Ford character asks a citizen to hold a glass of beer away from his body and then let it drop. He shoots it before it hits the ground. The scene is shot from behind the glass of beer with Ford facing directly into the camera, but is actually the result of trick photography. (This scene later came back to haunt Ford when, while in the service and on the pistol range, he was forced to prove his "fast draw" skill by an instructor who had seen the movie. Ford once recounted during a The Tonight Show interview how he had to stand there for hours until he succeeded in drawing his pistol and hitting the target.)

== Home media ==
The film was released in 1994 & 1999 by MGM Home Entertainment on VHS, then re-released in 2010 & 2017 by Warner Home Video (Warner Archive Collection) on DVD.

== Reception ==
=== Box office ===
According to MGM records, the film earned $2,246,000 in the US and Canada and $1,289,000 elsewhere, resulting in a profit of $1,292,000.

=== Critical response ===
When the film was first released, The New York Times film critic, Bosley Crowther, praised the film and the actors, writing, "Although it is more concerned with mood and motivation than with gunplay, The Fastest Gun Alive, which crashed into the Globe yesterday, emerges as an engrossing and, on occasion, a comic and tricky adventure ... Although it takes a mite too long to reveal the reasons for his actions, Glenn Ford's characterization of a man driven by fear and a desire for a peaceful life is both sensitive and forceful ... John Dehner does a professionally-smooth and funny job as one of his callous sidekicks; Jeanne Crain adds a tender and compassionate stint as Mr. Ford's understanding wife, and Leif Erickson, Allyn Joslyn, Rhys Williams, J. M. Kerrigan, Chris Olsen, the child actor, and Russ Tamblyn, who contributes an acrobatic dance reminiscent of his chore in Seven Brides for Seven Brothers, weigh in with competent performances as Cross Creek's leading lights."

Recently, film critic Dennis Schwartz praised the film, writing, "Though the story gets lost for too long in too much psychological explaining, it redeems itself with a fine action-packed tense ending. Rouse does a nice job keying in on the reactions of the townsmen, stages some fine action sequences and the performances are solid (especially by Ford and Crawford)."

== See also ==
- List of American films of 1956
