= That Lady from Peking =

- Directed by: Eddie Davis
- Written by: Eddie Davis
- Produced by: Eddie Davis
- Starring: Carl Betz
- Cinematography: Mick Bornemann
- Edited by: Anthony Buckley
- Production companies: Goldsworthy Productions; Commonwealth United Corporation
- Release date: 13 November 1975
- Running time: 86 minutes
- Country: Australia
- Language: English

That Lady from Peking is an Australian crime film written, produced and directed by Eddie Davis and starring Carl Betz, Nancy Kwan and Bobby Rydell. Although filmed in 1969, it was not screened commercially until 1975.

It was the last of three films Eddie Davis made in Australia.

== Plot ==
A defecting Russian diplomat has arranged to meet with author Max Foster in Hong Kong, promising a diary that will tell the truth about Red China. The diplomat is murdered and Foster tries to find the diary, which takes him to Sydney. Chinese, Russian and American spies take after him.

== Cast ==
- Carl Betz - Max Foster
- Nancy Kwan - Sue Ten Chan
- Bobby Rydell - Buddy Foster
- Sid Melton - Bunny Segal
- Don Reid - Spronsky
- Eva Lynd - Natalia
- Vicki Benet - Tess
- Owen Weingott - Barina
- Sandy Gore - Marisa Russo
- Graham Rouse - Varitch
- Kevin Golsby - Butcher
- Penny Sugg - Shirley
- John Warwick - Inspector
- Susan Jarett - Lydia
- Robert Bruning - Karl
- Jack Thompson - spy
- Brian Moll - Father Leonard

== Production ==
Shooting began in Sydney in July 1969, with some exteriors shot in Hong Kong. It was Jack Thompson's first movie role.

Church scenes were shot at St.John's Anglican Church, Wilberforce NSW Australia.

== Release ==
The film was poorly received, commercially and critically.
