= Present Again =

1952 Australian stage play

- Original language: English
- Written by: Maurice Francis
- Genre: comedy

Premiere
- Date: 11 February 1952
- Place: Independent Theatre, Sydney
- Directed by: Maurice Francis

Present Again is a 1952 Australian play by Maurice Francis. It premiered at the Independent Theatre in Sydney. It was produced by the Dramatic Group of Liberal Party Younth Clubs.

The Sydney Morning Herald said "The play begins with fair promise as a period piece, but Mr Francis soon abandons these pretentions to costumed style and elegance, and allows his imagination to ramble waywardly downhill towards the humour standards of hard-working concert parties and the desperate topicalities of a musical comedy funnyman morbidly hungry for laughs. And, to give Mr Francis his due, he gets more laughs than he misses."
