= Russell Rouse =

American screenwriter (1913–1987)

- Born: November 20, 1913; New York
- Died: October 2, 1987 (aged 73); Los Angeles
- Occupations: Screenwriter, director, producer
- Years active: 1942–1969
- Spouse: Beverly Michaels

Russell Rouse (November 20, 1913 – October 2, 1987) was an American screenwriter, director, and producer who is noted for the "offbeat creativity and originality" of his screenplays and for film noir movies and television episodes produced in the 1950s.

== Life and career ==
Rouse was the son of film pioneer Edwin Russell; his great uncle was the 1920s actor William Russell. He was educated at UCLA. His first employment in films was in the prop department at Paramount Studios, where he began writing screenplays. His play, Yokel Boy, was filmed in 1942 and became his first film writing credit.

Rouse has 18 credits as a screenwriter between 1942 and 1988. Starting with The Town Went Wild (1944), Rouse co-wrote many stories and scripts with Clarence Greene. The partners are noted for their work on a series of six film noirs, starting with D.O.A. (directed by Rudolph Maté-1949). With the second film in the series, The Well (1951), they also took on directing and producing: Rouse as director, and Greene as producer. This collaboration continued through the noir series (The Thief (1952), Wicked Woman (1953), New York Confidential (1955), and House of Numbers (1957)). In the late 1950s, Greene and Rouse formed Greene-Rouse Productions, which created the television series Tightrope that ran for one season (1959–1960) as well as two films in the 1960s.

In addition to their noir work, Rouse and Greene produced two westerns: The Fastest Gun Alive (1956) and Thunder in the Sun (1959). The 1959 film Pillow Talk was based on their story. Their careers drew to a close shortly after the unsuccessful film The Oscar (1966).

Rouse and Greene were nominated for the Academy Award for writing The Well (1951). They received the Academy Award for Pillow Talk (1959) (with Maurice Richlin and Stanley Shapiro). D.O.A. has been preserved in the National Film Registry. That film has been remade several times, and they were credited as writers on two of them: the Australian remake Color Me Dead from 1969 and the D.O.A. remake of 1988.

In 1957, Rouse married actress Beverly Michaels. Their son Christopher Rouse (b. 1958) is a noted film editor.

Rouse continued to write until he suffered a stroke in 1981. He died on October 2, 1987, in Los Angeles, California. He was cremated with his ashes scattered at sea. After his death, his wife Beverly Michaels Rouse said: "He worked everything from film props to junior writer to the technical crew. He came up in a classic type way and understood everything you could possibly understand about making the film. He did it all."

== Filmography ==
- Yokel Boy (story; 1942)
- Nothing But Trouble (writer; 1944)
- The Town Went Wild (story and screenplay; 1944)
- D.O.A. (writing; 1949)
- The Great Plane Robbery (story; 1950)
- The Well (writing and direction; 1951)
- The Thief (writing and direction; 1952)
- Wicked Woman (writing and direction, 1953)
- New York Confidential (writing and direction; 1955)
- The Fastest Gun Alive (screenplay and direction; 1956)
- House of Numbers (screenplay and direction; 1957)
- Thunder in the Sun (screenplay and direction; 1959)
- Pillow Talk (story; 1959)
- A House is Not a Home (screenplay and direction; 1964)
- The Oscar (screenplay and direction; 1966)
- The Caper of the Golden Bulls (directed; 1967)
- Color Me Dead (writer; 1969)
- D.O.A. (story; 1988)
