= Reg Goldsworthy =

Australian actor

Reginald Goldsworthy (1919–1981) was an Australian actor, writer and producer of radio and film. In the late 60s he established Goldsworthy Productions which made a number of movies. He started acting in Adelaide and then moved to Melbourne in the 1940s. He worked there for five years before relocating to Sydney, becoming a popular radio actor.

In the late 1960s he moved into film production.
