= Chester Schaeffer =

American film editor

- Born: Chester W. Schaeffer; September 9, 1902; New York City, New York, United States
- Died: January 5, 1992 (aged 89); Santa Clara, California
- Other name: Chet Schaeffer
- Occupation: Film editor
- Years active: 1932–1968

Chester Schaeffer (September 9, 1902 – January 5, 1992) was an American film and television editor with about thirty documentary and feature film credits, often for B movies.

Schaeffer's first feature film editing credit was for The Canterville Ghost (directed by Jules Dassin-1944). The film was produced by MGM Studios in Hollywood. In the era of the Hollywood studio system, film editors typically served an apprenticeship at the studio of about ten years as assistant editors before promotion to editor, and Schaeffer had been an Ben Lewis' assistant editor on Dinner at Eight (directed by George Cukor-1933). Schaeffer continued to edit for MGM productions through about 1949. Schaeffer was nominated for an Academy Award for the small scale drama The Well (1951), which was independently produced. The film was directed by Russell Rouse, and initiated their extended collaboration on seven films. He was nominated for an Emmy Award for the Disney television program Davy Crockett: Indian Fighter (1954). Schaeffer subsequently wove the footage from the first three "Davy Crockett" broadcast programs into the feature film Davy Crockett, King of the Wild Frontier (1955). He also worked on the classic chiller The Tingler (directed by William Castle-1959). Schaeffer's final feature film, The Caper of the Golden Bulls (1967), was also Rouse's final film as a director; Schaeffer retired from editing around 1968.

== See also ==
- List of film director and editor collaborations
