= Clarence Greene =

American film producer

- Born: August 10, 1913; New York, New York, United States
- Died: June 17, 1995 (aged 81); California, United States
- Occupations: Screenwriter, Film Producer
- Years active: 1944-1966
- Awards: Best Original Screenplay; 1959 Pillow Talk

Clarence Greene (August 10, 1913 – June 17, 1995) was an American screenwriter and film producer who is noted for the "offbeat creativity and originality of his screenplays and for films noir and television episodes produced in the 1950s.

== Career ==
Starting with the 1944 film The Town Went Wild, Greene co-wrote many stories and scripts with Russell Rouse. The partners are noted for their work on a series of six film noirs, starting with D.O.A. (directed by Rudolph Maté-1949).

With The Well (1951), they took on directing and producing: Rouse as director and Greene as producer. This collaboration continued with The Thief (1952), Wicked Woman (1953), New York Confidential (1955), and House of Numbers (1957).

In the late 1950s, Greene and Rouse formed Greene-Rouse Productions, which created the television series Tightrope that ran for one season (1959–1960) as well as two films in the 1960s.

In addition to their noir work, Rouse and Greene produced two westerns: The Fastest Gun Alive (1956) and Thunder in the Sun (1959). The 1959 film Pillow Talk was based on their story. Their careers drew to a close shortly after the unsuccessful film The Oscar (1966).

Rouse and Greene were nominated for the Academy Award for writing The Well (1951). They received the Academy Award for Pillow Talk (1959) (with Maurice Richlin and Stanley Shapiro). D.O.A. has been preserved in the National Film Registry. That film has been remade several times, and they were credited as writers on two of them: the Australian remake Color Me Dead from 1969 and the D.O.A remake of 1988.
