= Kurt St. Thomas =

American filmmaker, author and radio DJ

- Born: Virginia, United States
- Education: BA, Ashland University (1985)
- Occupations: Filmmaker, author, radio DJ
- Employers: WAQX-FM; WGIR-FM; WFNX; Arista Records; Tommy Boy Records; KROQ-FM; KDLD
- Spouse: Liz Stellingworth

Kurt St. Thomas is an American filmmaker, author, and radio DJ who has worked in the radio and music industry since 1985. During his time at the radio station WFNX in Boston, he became acquainted with the band Nirvana and was the first person to play the album Nevermind on the radio. St. Thomas later interviewed the band for Nevermind It's an Interview and co-authored the book Nirvana: The Chosen Rejects.

== Early life and education ==
Kurt St. Thomas was born in Virginia and raised in Pennsylvania. He attended Ashland University, graduating with a BA in radio and television in 1985.

== Radio career ==
After college, St. Thomas worked at Syracuse radio station WAQX-FM in 1985, then moved to work at WGIR-FM in Manchester, New Hampshire, in 1986.

From 1987–1995, St. Thomas worked at WFNX in Boston, serving as the station's program, music, and production director.

In 2005, St. Thomas started working at KROQ as a disc jockey, but left at the end of 2008 to join Indie 103.1 KDLD in Los Angeles. Following Indie 103.1's format change to Spanish in January 2009, he launched Houndstooth Radio, an internet radio station broadcasting from the garage of his house; the station featured mostly new independent artists. He later returned to KROQ and produced a show called Jonesy's Jukebox with Steve Jones from the Sex Pistols; he then spent seven years doing weekends and fill-in at KROQ.

On August 17, 2012, WFNX, now an internet-only station, re-hired St. Thomas as its executive music producer. He worked there until the station was shut down five months later.

=== Relationship with Nirvana ===
St. Thomas became interested in the band Nirvana after their 1989 debut album Bleach and meeting the band backstage after a concert in Cambridge, Massachusetts, the same year. At 7 pm on August 29, 1991, St. Thomas over the WFNX airwaves gave Nirvana's album Nevermind its world premiere by playing the album from start to finish. He invited the band to play at the WFNX's anniversary party the night before the album was released.

In 1992 he was asked to record with Nirvana the band's official interview album: Nevermind It's an Interview.

In 2004, he also co-authored a book about the band Nirvana: The Chosen Rejects with Troy Smith.

== Film career ==
=== Captive Audience ===
In 1996, St. Thomas began collaborating with Mike Gioscia in making what would become the feature film Captive Audience. The black and white film focused on a strange bond between an overnight disc-jockey and a gun-toting intruder. The film won seven international Film Festival awards including Board Of Directors Award Nashville Film Festival 1999, three at the 1999 Planet Indie Film Festival in Toronto, Best Feature Editing Rhode Island International Film Festival 2000 and Best Feature Magnolia Independent Film Festival 2000.

=== The Red Right Hand ===
The Red Right Hand is a horror film that takes place in 1978, and centers around five friends who reunite for their 15th high-school reunion. The film, starred John Doe, Edmund Lyndeck and Jeena Stern, was shot over 27 days and was primarily filmed in the old Metropolitan State Hospital in Waltham, Massachusetts. Its name was derived from the lyrics of a Nick Cave song.

=== D.O.A. ===
St. Thomas directed the 2022 film noir titled D.O.A., a loose remake of the 1950 noir of the same name. Set in 1949 St. Augustine and shot in black and white, the film follows a private detective who discovers he has been fatally poisoned and must solve the mystery of his own murder. It starred John Doe, Lucinda Jenney, John Byner, Jake La Botz, and Matt Pinfield. It won awards at the Fort Lauderdale International Film Festival, Montreal Independent Film Festival, Vegas Movie Awards, Magnolia Independent Film Festival, and Flagler Film Festival, among others.

=== Magnet Brain ===
In 2025, St. Thomas co-wrote and directed the short film Magnet Brain for the Baltimore 48 Hour Film Project. Starring Michael Bertrando, the mockumentary follows a billionaire whose company uses magnets to resurrect the dead and employ zombies to tackle workforce shortages. It won nine awards at the competition, including Best Film. It was selected as Baltimore's entry for the Filmapalooza 2026 in Lisbon, Portugal, where it won Best Hair & Makeup.

=== Bengoolie ===
In 2025, St. Thomas also co-wrote and directed the short film Bengoolie for the Philadelphia 48 Hour Film Project, where it won awards for Best Costume Design and Best Visual Effects.

=== Data Hum ===
In 2026, St. Thomas directed and produced the short film Data Hum for the 2026 Baltimore 48 Hour Film Project, where it won five awards including the Audience Award.

== Other projects ==
After leaving WFNX, St. Thomas went on to work for Clive Davis at Arista Records in 1995.

In 2001, he began working as an executive for the indie record label Tommy Boy Music. While at Tommy Boy, he directed music videos for the label's artists, Rustic Overtones.

== Filmography ==
=== Feature films ===
Year	Title	Director	Writer	Producer	Ref.
1999	Captive Audience	Yes	No	Yes	
2004	The Red Right Hand	Yes	No	Yes	
2020	The Last	Yes	No	Yes	
2022	D.O.A.	Yes	Yes	Yes	

=== Short films ===
Year	Title	Director	Writer	Producer	Ref.
2025	Magnet Brain	Yes	Yes	Yes	
2025	Bengoolie	Yes	Yes	Yes	
2026	Data Hum	Yes	No	Yes	

== Discography ==
=== Music videos ===
Year	Song	Artist
1999	"I Wanna Make You"	Orbit
2000	"Hit the Ground"	6Gig
2001	"C'mon"	Rustic Overtones
2001	"Combustible"	Rustic Overtones
2002	"Everybody Lets Me Down"	J Mascis + The Fog
2002	"Monkey Man"	Reel Big Fish
2002	"At the Party"	Northern State
2002	"Frustrated Unnoticed"	Damone
2002	"The Bell"	Stephan Said
2003	"The Quiet Things That No One Ever Knows"	Brand New
2003	"Hey Driver"	Lucky Boys Confusion
2004	"Save You"	Hot Rod Circuit
2005	"Back to Me"	Kathleen Edwards
2006	"Signing Emo"	MC Lars
2012	"Hyperactive"	The Dollyrots
2020	"See The Light"	Orbit

=== Interview CDs ===
- Producer and host of Nirvana Nevermind It's an Interview
- Producer and host of The Breeders, The Secret History of The Breeders Both Verbal And Musical
- Producer and Host A Conversation With Frank Black
