= John Byner =

American actor (born 1938)

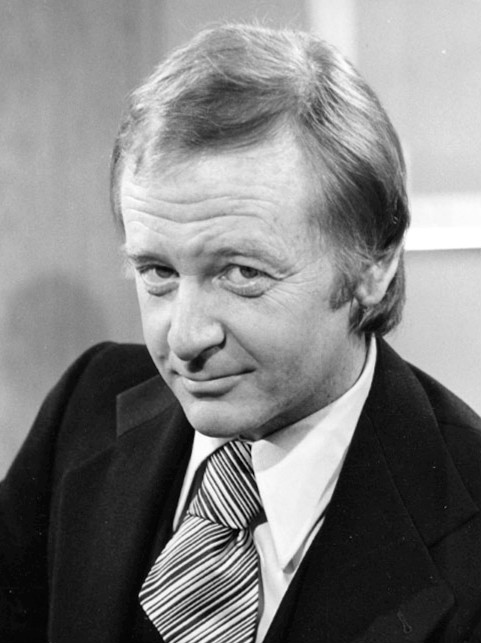
- Byner in 1976
- Born: John Biener; June 28, 1938 (age 88); New York City, New York, U.S.
- Occupations: Actor; comedian; impressionist
- Years active: 1963−present
- Spouses: Eleanor Belcher (m. 1960; div. 1969); Sally Fisher (m. 1982; div. 1983); Ksenia Prohaska (m. 1985, divorced); Anne Gaybis (m. 1992)
- Children: 4 (with Eleanor Belcher)

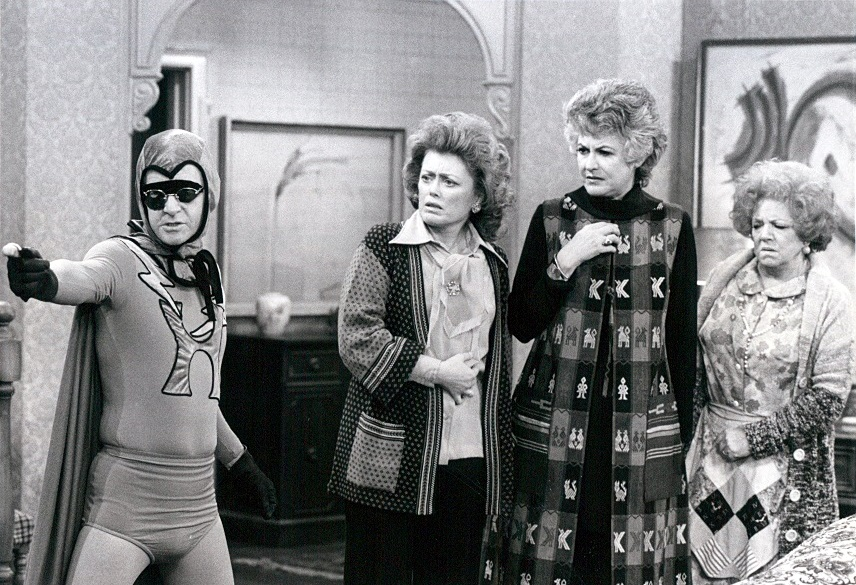
John Byner, Rue McClanahan, Bea Arthur and Hermione Baddeley on Maude (1977)

John Byner (né Biener; born June 28, 1938) is an American actor, comedian and impressionist who has had a lengthy television and film career. His voice work includes the cartoon series The Ant and the Aardvark, in which the title characters are voiced by Byner's impressions of Dean Martin and Jackie Mason.

== Career ==
On The Ed Sullivan Show, where he made his first early TV appearances, he mimicked Ed Sullivan among many others. Other impressions included John Wayne and singing like Dean Martin and Johnny Mathis. His ability to mimic "Toastmaster General" George Jessel came in handy during his appearances on panel programs such as celebrity roasts and other tributes.

In 1966 Byner released "Everybody Do The," a musical spoof of dance crazes, as a single on the Pop-Side label. Byner wrote the song with his manager Harry Colomby. The B side of the record was a cover of the blues/R&B/rock standard "Baby, Please Don't Go."

On a 1967 episode of Get Smart he played a KAOS agent who made a phone call to the Chief of CONTROL (played by Edward Platt), performed a perfect impression of President Lyndon B. Johnson, and told the Chief he was fired and replaced with agent Maxwell Smart (Don Adams).

In 1970-1971 he hosted 22 episodes of Something Else, a syndicated half-hour musical variety series. He then hosted his own show in 1972 called the John Byner Comedy Hour, where the character Super Dave Osborne, portrayed by Bob Einstein, was first introduced. The same year he had a cameo in What's Up, Doc? In the mid-1970s he guest-starred in two episodes of The Odd Couple.

Byner played a comedian/impersonator aboard a cruise ship in season 6 of Hawaii Five-O. His character did impersonations of John Wayne and then got hit on the back of his head as a diversionary tactic by the bad guy. He had a recurring role in the sitcom The Practice during its first season in 1976.

In the late 1970s he had a featured role as Detective Donahue on the TV series Soap. Byner also appeared several times on The Carol Burnett Show, where in one comedy sketch he wore a Donald Duck costume and mimicked the cartoon character's distinctive voice. He appeared several times on talk shows hosted by David Letterman.

In the 1980s he hosted Bizarre (produced and filmed in Canada), which re-introduced many people to hapless daredevil Super Dave Osborne played by Bob Einstein. In 1983, he had a role as Doc, who was Burt Reynolds's longtime childhood friend in the film Stroker Ace. In 1985, The Walt Disney Company's animated feature The Black Cauldron was released, featuring Byner's voice as the characters Gurgi and Doli. He was a regular celebrity guest on Hollywood Squares during the John Davidson years and later hosted the 1988-1989 syndicated game show Relatively Speaking. He appeared in an episode of Friday the 13th: The Series as a ventriloquist.

On the February 13th, 1997 episode of Judge Judy, Byner appeared as a plaintiff against the agent Dan Jordon and won a judgement of $3,500 as a kill fee for the cancellation of a stand up comedy performance.

On May 26, 2017, it was reported that Byner had been cast in a supporting role in the horror anthology series Lore, based on the podcast of the same name. Byner portrays Patrick Boland, the father of Bridget Cleary (played by Holland Roden). Lore premiered on October 13, 2017.

In 2020 Byner released his autobiography Five Minutes, Mr. Byner!, co-written with Douglas Wellman.

In 2022 Byner played an affable gangster named Majak in Kurt St. Thomas' D.O.A., a loose remake of the 1950 film noir of the same title. His performance earned him the Best Supporting Actor award at the 2023 Flagler Film Festival.

== Personal life ==
Byner was born John Biener in New York City on June 28, 1938, the son of Christina, a mental hospital attendant, and Michael Biener, a truck mechanic.

Byner has been married four times, and he has four children with his first wife Eleanor Belcher. One of his children, Don (Donny) Byner, appeared for the first time on television dressed as him in a 1969 episode of Something Else on ABC. He has been married to Anne Gaybis since 1992.

== Filmography ==
=== Film ===
Year	Title	Role	Notes
1969	The Ant and the Aardvark	Aardvark/Ant	Short film; voice role
1969	Hasty But Tasty	Aardvark/Ant	Short film; voice role
1969	The Ant from Uncle	Aardvark/Ant/Aunt	Short film; voice role
1969	I've Got Ants in my Plans	Aardvark/Ant/Green Aardvark	Short film; voice role
1969	The Deadwood Thunderball	Roland	Short film; voice role
1969	Technology, Phooey	Aardvark/Ant/Computer	Short film; voice role
1969	Tijuana Toads	Texas Grasshopper	Short film; voice role
1969	Never Bug an Ant	Aardvark/Ant	Short film; voice role
1969	Dune Bug	Aardvark/Ant/Life Guard/Woman	Short film; voice role
1969	Isle of Caprice	Aardvark	Short film; voice role
1970	Scratch a Tiger	Aaardvark/Ant	Short film; voice role
1970	Odd Ant Out	Aardvark/Ant/Green Aardvark	Short film; voice role
1970	Ants in the Pantry	Aardvark/Ant/Pest Control Employee	Short film; voice role
1970	Science Friction	Aardvark/Ant/Scientist	Short film; voice role
1970	Mumbo Jumbo	Aardvark/Ant/Tiny	Short film
1970	The Froze Nose Knows	Aardvark/Ant	Short film; voice role
1970	Don't Hustle an Ant with Muscle	Aardvark/Ant	Short film; voice role
1971	Rough Brunch	Aardvark/Ant	Short film; voice role
1971	From Bed to Worse	Aardvark/Ant	Short film; voice role
1972	What's Up, Doc?	Man at the Hotel Banquet	Uncredited
1977	The Great Smokey Roadblock	Bobby Apples	also known as The Goodbye Run and the Last of the Cowboy
1979	A Pleasure Doing Business	Lenny	
1983	Stroker Ace	Doc Seegle	
1985	The Black Cauldron	Gurgi / Doli	Voice
1985	Transylvania 6-5000	Radu	
1992	Munchie Strikes Back	Coach Elkins	
1997	Wishmaster	Doug Clegg	
2000	My 5 Wives	Preston Gates	
2008	RoboDoc	The Judge	
2009	The Greatest Show on Earth	Walter / The Magnificent Mr. Beauregard	Short film
2015	The Kustomonster Movie	Colonel Climber	
2016	Endangered!!!	Narration	Short film
2022	D.O.A.	Majak	
2026	Once Upon Time.Documentary!!!	Maestro	Short film

=== Television ===
Year	Title	Role	Notes
1964	The Ed Sullivan Show	Himself	June 21, Impersonated Elvis Presley
1967	The Steve Allen Comedy Hour	Himself	Episode: #1.01
1967–1968	Accidental Family	Dewey	Recurring role; 4 episodes
1968	Get Smart	Gorshen	Episode: "The Hot Line"
1968	The Mothers-in-Law	Arnold Lacy	Episode: "It's a Dog's Life"
1969	That's Life		Episode: "Chalk Can Be Sexy"
1969	The Pink Panther Show	Aardvark/Ant	Unknown episodes
1971	Aesop's Fables	Tortoise	Animated television special; voice role
1972	The Don Rickles Show	Giuseppe	Episode: #1.3
1972	The Singles		Television film
1972	The John Byner Comedy Hour	Self/Host	Limited August 1972 series of 5 episodes.
1973	Love, American Style	Wendall McFee	Segment: "Love and the Lifter"; Episode: "Love and the Comedienne/Love and the Lie/Love and the Lifter/Love and the Suspicious Husband"
1973–1974	The Odd Couple	Hooper / Bert	Guest role; 2 episodes
1974	Hawaii Five-O	Duffy Malone	Episode: "Killer at Sea"
1975	When Things Were Rotten	Dr. Otto Bahn	Episode: "The Ultimate Weapon"
1976	The Tonight Show Starring Johnny Carson	Himself	Episode: #15.4
1976	The Practice	Dr. Roland Caine	Guest role; 2 episodes
1976	The Pink Panther Laugh and a Half Hour and a Half Show	Ant / Aardvark	Voice role
1977	Maude	Marshall Keebler	Episode: "Captain Hero"
1977	McNamara's Band	Johnny McNamara	Television film
1978–1980	Soap	Detective Donahue	Recurring role; 17 episodes
1978	Three on a Date	Donald Lumis	Television film
1978	A Guide for the Married Woman	Elevator Man	Television film
1979	Stockard Channing in Just Friends	Jerry Smeg	Episode: "The Hollywood Syndrome"
1979	The Man in the Santa Claus Suit	Stan Summerville	Television film
1980	Murder Can Hurt You!	Len "Hatch" Hatchington	Television film
1980–1986	Bizarre	Himself	Host and Performer; 141 episodes
1982	Will: G. Gordon Liddy	Richard Nixon	Television film; voice role
1986	ABC Weekend Special	Guest with Dog	Episode: "The Mouse and the Motorcycle"
1986	The Love Boat	Arthur Burkley	Guest role; 2 episodes
1988	A Whole Lotta Fun		Television film
1988	Friday the 13th: The Series	Travis Plunckett	Episode: "Read My Lips"
1991	Married... with Children	The Prospector	Episode: "Route 666: Part 1"
1991	A Wish for Wings That Work	Bill the Cat	Television special; voice role
1992–1994	Silk Stalkings	Cotton Dunn	Recurring role; 12 episodes
1993	Garfield and Friends		Guest role; 2 episodes, voice role
1993	SWAT Kats: The Radical Squadron	David Litterbin	Episode: "Enter the Madkat"; voice role
1993–1995	The Pink Panther	Aardvark/Ant	Guest role, voice role
1994	Lamb Chop in the Haunted Studio	Himself	Television film
1994–1995	Aaahh!!! Real Monsters	Sheriff / Old Man / Dean	Guest role; 3 episodes
1994–1996	Duckman	Dr. Gerhardt Morsink	Guest role; 2 episodes
1995	In the Heat of the Night	Tom Harwood	Episode: "Grow Old Along with Me"
1995	The Twisted Tales of Felix the Cat	Mr. Frog	Guest role; 2 episodes, voice role
1997	Rugrats	Carwash Owner / Cashier	Episode: "The Carwash/Heatwave"; voice role
1997	Judge Judy	Himself / Plaintiff	Episode: "John Byner Sues a Theater"
1997	Dharma & Greg	Reverend James	Episode: "And Then There's the Wedding"
1998	Super Dave's All Stars	Elvis	Episode: #1.4
1998	The Angry Beavers	Alien Object / Man's Voice	Episode: "The Day the World Got Really Screwed Up"; voice role
2002	The Big Time	Ed Wynn	Television film
2013	The First Family	Malcolm MacDougal	Episode: "The First Shrink"
2017	Lore	Patrick Boland	Episode: "Black Stockings"
