= Nirvana: The Chosen Rejects =

Book by Kurt St. Thomas and Troy Smith

- Authors: Kurt St. Thomas; Troy Smith
- Language: English
- Publisher: St. Martin's Press
- Publication date: 22 April 2004
- Publication place: United States
- Media type: Print (paperback)
- Pages: 320
- ISBN: 9780312206635

Nirvana: The Chosen Rejects is a book written by Kurt St. Thomas and Troy Smith about the American rock band Nirvana. It was published in April 2004 by St. Martin's Press. The book narrates the journey of the band members, covering their childhoods, the band's rise to fame, and the aftermath of Kurt Cobain's death.

== Background and writing ==
Kurt St. Thomas, a former program director of radio station WFNX, had become acquainted with Nirvana in 1990 and gave the world premiere of the band's breakthrough album Nevermind in August 1991 by playing the entire album on WFNX. St. Thomas and his colleague Troy Smith spent two days with the band in September 1991 during a WFNX-sponsored show in Boston, on the eve of the release of Nevermind.

The authors reportedly spent eight years on the book, and exchanged material through the internet. The book contains quotes from St. Thomas' three interview sessions with band members Kurt Cobain, Krist Novoselic and Dave Grohl in 1992. The book also includes a discography section which catalogs every song released by the band. The title of the book is derived from Cobain's quote describing the band, "We're the chosen rejects of society."
