= Tincan Experiment =

- Cover used for physical releases

Studio album by 6gig
- Released: October 24, 2000
- Studio: Royaltone Studios (Los Angeles, California); Big Sound Studios (Westbrook, Maine); The Studio (Portland, Maine); Long View Farms Studios; (North Brookfield, Massachusetts)
- Genre: Nu metal, alternative metal, post-grunge
- Length: 46:30
- Label: Ultimatum Music
- Producer: Roger Sommers

6gig chronology
Tincan Experiment (2000)	Mind Over Mind (2002)

Professional ratings
Review scores
Source	Rating
AllMusic	2/5 stars
Portland Press Herald	B−

Tincan Experiment is the first album by the American band 6gig. It was released in 2000 by Ultimatum Music.

== Production ==
The album was recorded at Long View Farm Studios, in Massachusetts. It was produced by Roger Sommers.

== Critical reception ==
AllMusic wrote that "the visceral drive is there, but there's little substance to tunes like '5' and 'Method' to give it staying power." The Telegram & Gazette called the album "a confident, hard-hitting combination of bombast and melodicism." The Vancouver Sun wrote: "Weirdly enough for such a young crew of ambitious rockers, there's a plodding, lifelessness at work here." The Providence Journal wrote that "the band's diversity of styles can hamper the effort when no prevailing sound emerges ... But all the variety has its rewards."

== Track listing ==
1. Method
2. Hit the Ground
3. 5
4. Junk, Puppet, Paperclip
5. Tincan Experiment
6. Yesterday
7. Talkshow
8. Gasoline Trail
9. Built For It
10. Klones
11. Bagmask
12. Willie

== Album credits ==
- Mastering – George Marino
- Producer, Engineer, Mixing – Roger Sommers
- Art Direction, Design, Photography – Walter Craven
- Producer, Engineer – Spencer Albee
- Management – Bill Beasley
- Violin, String Arrangements – Eric Gorfain
- Engineer – John Wyman, Jim Begley
- Violin – Roland Hartwell
- Producer, Main Performer – 6Gig
- Assistant Engineer – Chris Wonzer
- Engineer, Editing – Curt Kroeger
- Viola – Piotr Jandula
- Management – T.J. McNaboe
- Photography – Becky Neiman
- Assistant Engineer – Joe Brien
- Cello – Richard Dodd
