= Lucinda Jenney =

American actress

- Occupations: Actress; voice artist
- Years active: 1979–present
- Spouse(s): John Swanger; Bill Moseley

Lucinda Jenney is an American actress.

== Personal life ==
Jenney is married to actor Bill Moseley.

Jenney was previously married to artist John Swanger, from 1989 to 1991.

== Early life ==
Jenney was born in New York, NY.

== Career ==
She began her acting career in 1979 with the film Impostors. Several roles followed throughout the 1980s, with appearances in the 1986 comedy The Whoopee Boys and Peggy Sue Got Married with Kathleen Turner and Nicolas Cage. She appeared as Iris in Rain Man, starring Dustin Hoffman and Tom Cruise.

In 1991, Jenney portrayed the waitress Lena in Ridley Scott's Thelma & Louise; the following year, she appeared in American Heart, a film which earned her an Independent Spirit Award for Best Supporting Female. Jenney played the role of 'Anne Loomis' in the Joe Dante comedy Matinee, with John Goodman and Cathy Moriarty. During the nineties, she appeared in much smaller roles including Mr. Jones with Richard Gere, and Leaving Las Vegas, with Nicolas Cage and Elisabeth Shue, as well as Grace of My Heart.

In 1996, she had a supporting role in the Tom Holland's horror film Thinner, which was based on the book by Stephen King. She also appeared as Lieutenant Blondell in G.I. Jane, with Demi Moore, Mad City, with Dustin Hoffman and John Travolta, Desert Blue, with Kate Hudson and Christina Ricci, Practical Magic, with Sandra Bullock and Nicole Kidman and The Deep End of the Ocean.

In 2000, Jenney portrayed Helen O'Donnell in Thirteen Days. That year, she also played the role of Trina in How to Kill Your Neighbor's Dog. She then appeared in romantic drama Crazy/Beautiful, with Kirsten Dunst and The Mothman Prophecies, starring Richard Gere. Jenney's has appeared in other roles in S.W.A.T., American Violet and Rogue River. In 2009, she made a cameo appearance in The Hangover.

Jenney has appeared in various television shows, which includes guest roles in Miami Vice, The Practice, Judging Amy, The West Wing, 24, Law & Order, its spin-offs Law & Order: Criminal Intent and Law & Order: LA, Crossing Jordan, Six Feet Under, House, CSI: Crime Scene Investigation, ER, Monk, and Battlestar Galactica.

Jenney has appeared in many television films throughout her career. Her first was Out of the Darkness, with Martin Sheen. Some of her roles include Shoot First: A Cop's Vengeance, The Habitation of Dragons, A Stranger in Town, First Time Felon, the Emmy Award-winning If These Walls Could Talk 2, and The Pennsylvania Miners' Story.

== Filmography ==
=== Film ===
Year	Title	Role	Notes
1979	Impostors		
1984	Hearts and Diamonds		
1986	The Whoopee Boys	Olivia	
1986	Peggy Sue Got Married	Rosalie Testa	
1987	The Verne Miller Story	Bobby	
1988	Rain Man	Iris	
1989	Wired	Judy Belushi	
1989	Born on the Fourth of July	Passerby #2	
1991	Thelma & Louise	Lena	
1992	American Heart	Charlotte	Nominated — Independent Spirit Award for Best Supporting Female
1993	Matinee	Anne Loomis	
1993	Mr. Jones	Christine	
1994	Two Over Easy	Diane	Short film
1995	Leaving Las Vegas	Weird Woman	
1996	Grace of My Heart	Marion	
1996	Thinner	Heidi Halleck	
1997	Loved	Kate Amerson	
1997	The Last Time I Committed Suicide	Rosie Trickle	
1997	G.I. Jane	Lieutenant Blondell	
1997	Mad City	Jenny	
1998	Desert Blue	Caroline Baxter	
1998	What Dreams May Come	Mrs. Jacobs	
1998	Practical Magic	Sara (adult)	
1998	Welcome to Hollywood	Actress at Alison Anders' House	
1999	Sugar Town	Kate	
1999	The Deep End of the Ocean	Laurie	
2000	Crime and Punishment in Suburbia	Vincent's Mom	
2000	How to Kill Your Neighbor's Dog	Trina Walsh	
2000	Remember the Titans	Arleen Yoast	Uncredited
2000	Thirteen Days	Helen O'Donnell	
2001	Crazy/Beautiful	Courtney Oakley	
2002	The Mothman Prophecies	Denise Smallwood	
2003	S.W.A.T.	Kathy	
2006	Hide & Seek	Betty	Short film
2007	The Final Season	Sheryl 'Chic' Van Scoyoc	
2007	At the Beach		Short film
2008	American Violet	Elizabeth Beckett	
2009	The Hangover		Cameo
2009	The Postcard	Blanche Katz	Short film
2010	Rogue River	Lea	
2017	We Don't Belong Here	Dora	
2017	A Thousand Junkies	Blake's Mom	
2019	3 from Hell	Nebraska	
2022	D.O.A.	Grace	
2024	The Knife	Mary	
2024	Scared to Death	Detective Harris	

=== Television ===
Year	Title	Role	Notes
1985	First Steps	Carolyn	Television film
1985	Out of the Darkness	Mary	Television film
1986	Spenser: For Hire	Melissa Brenner	Episode: "Hell Hath No Fury"
1988	Miami Vice	Annie Pierce	Episode: "Vote of Confidence"
1989	CBS Summer Playhouse	Lucy	Episode: "Microcops"
1990	Shannon's Deal	Audrey Watts	Episode: "Custody"
1991	Shoot First: A Cop's Vengeance	Beth	Television film
1992	The Water Engine	Gross's Secretary	Television film
1992	The Habitation of Dragons	Bernice Dayton	
1994	Next Door	Marci Benedetti	Television film
1994	Homicide: Life on the Street	Pamela Wilgis	Episode: "Extreme Unction"
1995	A Stranger in Town	Jeanine	Television film
1995	Fallen Angels	Ginny	Episode: "The Black Bargain"
1995	Eye of the Stalker	Liz Knowlton	Television film
1996	The Late Shift	Debbie Vickers	Television film
1996	High Incident	Officer Anne Bonner	4 episodes
1997	EZ Streets	Mrs. Dog Face	Episode: "Every Dog Has Its Day
1997	First Time Felon	Sharon	Television film
1997	The Visitor	Nadine Walden	Episodes: "Pilot", "Fear of Flying"
1998	Scattering Dad	Molly	Television film
1998	NYPD Blue	Rose	Episode: "Hammer Time"
1998	L.A. Doctors	Rosalind	Episode: "A Prayer for the Lying"
1999	Fitz	Linda Palmer	Episodes: "First Love: Part 1", "First Love: Part 2"
2000	If These Walls Could Talk 2	Ella's Mommy	Segment: "2000"
2000	The Practice	Angela Jamison	Episodes: "Summary Judgments", "Germ Welfare"
2001	Gideon's Crossing	Teddy Green	Episode: "The Race"
2002	Judging Amy	Allison Cossey	Episode: "Not Stumbling, But Dancing"
2002	The West Wing	Karen Kroft	Episode: "Swiss Diplomacy"
2002	The Pennsylvania Miners' Story	Cindy Thomas	Television film
2003	The Shield	Lanie Kellis	7 episodes
2003	Carnivàle	Flora Hawkins	Episode: "Milfay"
2003	24	Helen Singer	4 episodes
2004	Law & Order	Renee Bishop	Episode: "Married with Children"
2004	Crossing Jordan	Judy Strand	Episode: "Missing Pieces"
2004	Six Feet Under	Kenneth's Ex-Wife	Episode: "Untitled"
2004	House	Sister Mary Eucharist	Episode: "Damned If You Do"
2005	Law & Order: Criminal Intent	Elise Garrett	Episodes: "In the Wee Small Hours: Part 1", "In the Wee Small Hours: Part 2"
2007	CSI: Crime Scene Investigation	Sheriff Beth McGuire	Episode: "Leaving Las Vegas"
2007	Cold Case	Shirley Reed	Episode: "8:03AM"
2007	Battlestar Galactica	Carolanne Adama	Episode: "A Day in the Life"
2007	ER	Allison	Episode: "Seas Change"
2007	Monk	Zena Davis	Episode: "Mr. Monk is Up All Night"
2011	Law & Order: LA	Professor	Episode: "Big Rock Mesa"
