= D.O.A. (2022 film) =

2022 film by Kurt St. Thomas

- Theatrical release poster
- Directed by: Kurt St. Thomas
- Screenplay by: Nicholas Griffin
- Story by: Kurt St. Thomas; Nicholas Griffin
- Based on: D.O.A. by: Rudolph Maté; Russell Rouse; Clarence Greene
- Produced by: Kurt St. Thomas; Emma Keating; Nicholas Griffin
- Starring: John Doe; Lucinda Jenney; John Byner; Matt Pinfield
- Cinematography: Peter Berglund
- Edited by: Kurt St. Thomas; Emma Keating; Keaton Bicknell
- Music by: Jaimee Jimin Park
- Color process: Black and white
- Production company: Houndstooth Films
- Distributed by: Bitmax
- Release date: November 2022
- Running time: 82 minutes
- Country: United States
- Language: English

D.O.A. is a 2022 American neo-noir directed by Kurt St. Thomas and starring John Doe (of punk rock band X). It is a loose remake of the 1950 film of the same name starring Edmond O'Brien. Doe plays Frank Bigelow, a private detective in post-war Florida who discovers that he has been fatally poisoned and has to solve the mystery of his own murder. The film premiered at the 2022 Fort Lauderdale International Film Festival. It was subsequently released on multiple streaming platforms.

== Plot ==
Frank Bigelow, a private detective, arrives at the St. Augustine police station one night and tells the detective, Parker, that he has a murder to report: his own. He narrates his story. Three days earlier, at his office in Crescent City, he is visited by a St. Augustine socialite, Catherine Phillips. Her husband, Gene, has mysteriously moved out after getting involved with a gangster named Majak. She hires Bigelow to investigate.

Bigelow drives to St. Augustine and stakes out the Ponce de Leon Hotel, where Gene Phillips is staying. He follows Phillips, who meets with a shadowy man, but a hood named Chester runs Bigelow off. That evening, he follows a lead to the Blue Bay nightclub. He meets Sam Haskell, a salesman who bought him a drink at the hotel earlier. Later, he meets the nightclub's singer, Rita, whom he believes is romantically involved with Phillips. They share cocktails until another hood, Whitey, interrupts. When Bigelow tries to follow them, he is suddenly taken ill and passes out.

Arriving back at the hotel, Bigelow collapses and wakes in the hospital. A doctor informs him that he has been poisoned with iridium and has only days to live. Bigelow flees the hospital. Avoiding the cops, he hides in the hospital chapel where he meets Grace, a patient. Bigelow resolves to use the time he has left to find out who slipped the iridium into his cocktail at the Blue Bay. Rita tells him that Majak is behind what was going on.

Bigelow's secretary, Kitty, informs him that Phillips wants to see him. He goes to Phillips' office to find Stanley Phillips, Gene's brother, who tells him to leave town. Bigelow refuses; Stanley turns him over to Whitey and Chester, who drive him to meet with Arthur Majak. Majak tells Bigelow that the poisoning is the result of a deal gone wrong and whoever stole the iridium also poisoned Bigelow. If Bigelow finds the iridium, Majak will kill Bigelow's murderer.

Bigelow runs into Grace, and reluctantly agrees to meet her the following evening for Mass. The next morning, Bigelow confronts Catherine and threatens to go to the police: her story was a con job to throw off Majak. Catherine confesses she and Stanley are in partnership with a man named Lockwood, who stole the iridium.

When Bigelow returns to his motel, Kitty is waiting for him. She had snuck into his room at the Ponce and retrieved a message waiting for him when he collapsed the previous day. Bigelow then goes to the meeting place in the message, a lighthouse, where he finds Gene Phillips dead. He chases Lockwood, who escapes, and then goes back to the Phillips' office. Stanley Phillips is dead and Whitey and Chester are in the act of killing Lockwood. They take him to see Majak. Since Bigelow does not have the iridium, Majak tells Chester and Whitey to kill Bigelow and feed him to the alligators.

At the alligator farm, Chester tortures Bigelow; Whitey objects, and while they fight, Bigelow is able to retrieve the gun in his car and kill Chester. Whitey tells him that Mrs. Phillips is leaving from the local airport. Bigelow, close to death, speeds to the airport and confronts Catherine, who admits that he was hired as a test subject to confirm that the iridium was legit. Her partner, Haskell, arrives with the iridium and admits to poisoning Bigelow. A shot blast interrupts Haskell's story, and he collapses. Rita emerges from behind the plane; she and Mrs. Phillips are partners. They leave Bigelow on the tarmac and take off with the iridium for Cuba.

Bigelow meets Grace outside the church to say goodbye. He then goes to the police station to tell his story. Parker expresses regret that he can't do more for him; the women are gone, and Majak is untouchable. Bigelow, resigned to his fate, dies in his chair.

== Cast ==
- John Doe as Frank Bigelow
- Lucinda Jenney as Grace
- Matt Pinfield as Captain Parker
- John Byner as Majak
- Tony V. as Whitey
- Jake La Botz as Chester
- Paola Duque as Rita
- Anne Gaybis as Mrs. Phillips
- Pamela Rickard as Kitty Gibson
- Jan Harrelson as Dr. Freeman
- Kevin Crowley as Stanley Phillips
- Peter Wise as Haskell

== Production ==
=== Development ===
Director Kurt St. Thomas came across the 1950 film D.O.A. while searching for public domain films for his next project. He was based in St. Augustine, Florida, at the time, and chose to modify the original D.O.A. storyline to be set in St. Augustine in the year 1949. The script was rewritten by Nicholas Griffin, who had previously worked on films such as Matchstick Men. St. Thomas said, "I broke a lot of rules making D.O.A., and I'm glad I did. The first rule I broke was to make a movie in the first place, and then to make a film noir, which they don't make anymore."

=== Casting ===
John Doe was cast as the main character Frank Bigelow. St. Thomas had known Doe for many years and discussed the storyline with him after Doe had just finished playing for his band X in St. Augustine. Doe remarked that he was attracted by the city's "gothic feel" and added, "A lot of the buildings are reminiscent of the era just previous to that, you know, the '20s and '30, and so it made perfect sense." Others who joined the cast included Lucinda Jenney, Tony V., Jake La Botz and John Byner, while Matt Pinfield appears in a cameo role. In addition, six local actors from the city were also part of the cast.

=== Filming ===
The film was shot in black-and-white on a RED Dragon camera with Angenieux lenses. Most of the filming took place in April 2019 across various locations in and around St. Augustine, including the Alligator Farm Zoological Park, the Bridge of Lions, the steam room at the Lightner Museum, the St. Augustine Lighthouse, and Evergreen Cemetery. Production experienced a delay due to COVID-19 pandemic-related restrictions. St. Thomas, Emma Keating and Keaton Bicknell completed the editing in 2021.

== Release ==
D.O.A. premiered on November 11, 2022, at the Fort Lauderdale International Film Festival, where it won the Special Jury Award for Production and the Spirit of Independents Award. It was also screened at and won awards at the Montreal Independent Film Festival, the Vegas Movie Awards, the Magnolia Independent Film Festival, and the Flagler Film Festival.

The film was released on video on demand (VOD) streaming platforms on November 10, 2023.

== Reception ==
David Luhrssen of The Shepherd Express praised the cinematography and screenplay, and said: "the new DOA is an enjoyable two hours for noir buffs—and good to see John Doe as the hero in a world gone amok." Allison Anders named D.O.A. as one of her favorite films of 2023, writing on IndieWire, "The tender relationship between Frank Bigelow and Grace is such a beautifully transforming connection that it pushes the [film noir] genre into a whole other possibility."
