= Next Door (1994 film) =

1994 American television film

- 1995 VHS cover
- Written by: Barney Cohen
- Directed by: Tony Bill
- Starring: James Woods; Randy Quaid; Kate Capshaw; Lucinda Jenney
- Music by: Van Dyke Parks
- Country of origin: United States
- Original language: English

Production
- Producers: Jay Benson; Barney Cohen
- Cinematography: Thomas Del Ruth
- Editor: Axel Hubert
- Running time: 95 minuntes
- Production companies: Showtime Networks; Nederlander Television and Film Productions, Inc. Tudor Entertainment, Inc. TriStar Television

Original release
- Network: Showtime
- Release: September 4, 1994

Next Door is a 1994 American black comedy television movie starring James Woods, Randy Quaid, Kate Capshaw and Lucinda Jenney. It originally aired September 4, 1994, on the Showtime network and was made available on VHS on January 17, 1995.

== Plot ==
Matt Coler, a sophisticated college professor, and Karen, his schoolteacher wife, have moved to a new neighborhood for Matt's teaching job. They refuse campus housing and decide to live in the suburbs in order to expose their son Bucky to blue-collar types. Their neighbors turn out to be loutish beer-swilling butcher Lenny Benedetti and his wife Marci, who are unruly and loud.

When the Benedettis’ obsession with lawn watering drowns Karen's azaleas, a feud erupts between the two families, escalating into a series of tit-for-tat actions. Matt ruins Lenny's patio furniture, and Lenny retaliates by flooding Matt's car. Matt eventually tries calling a truce, but Lenny continues to harass the Colers. After their dog is poisoned, the Colers call the police. The cops find no evidence against Lenny and urge the two families to bury the hatchet and make peace.

The feud spreads to involve the families' children, with Bucky beating up Lenny's son Sparky. In return, Lenny attacks Matt and attempts to assault Karen while she is home alone. Matt goes to Lenny's workplace and publicly threatens him, revealing that Lenny has been laid off.

That night Lenny breaks into Matt's home and terrorizes the family. To defend his family, Matt desperately fights the bigger, stronger Lenny. The bloody battle ends with Lenny being set ablaze by Matt, who tells police that Lenny went too far.

== Cast ==
- James Woods as Matt Coler
- Randy Quaid as Lenny Benedetti
- Kate Capshaw as Karen Coler
- Lucinda Jenney as Marci Benedetti
- Miles Fuelner as Bucky Coler
- Billy L. Sullivan as Sparky Benedetti

== Reception ==
In his review for Variety, John P. McCarthy complimented the performances of Woods, Quaid, and Capshaw, but wrote, "Cohen’s script has its ironies and logic, but there isn’t enough for a full-blown satire. Although Bill tries hard to blend the farcical humor and the nightmarish dimension, they ultimately cancel each other out."

TV Guide wrote, "Barney Cohen's script is an amalgam of black comedy, suspense, and social commentary, but Next Door is never as funny, frightening, or incisive as it is unsettling. As the savagery escalates, the film's tone becomes increasingly uneasy, the filmmakers' message obscured".
