= John Swanger =

American painter

John Swanger is an American artist of abstract paintings. Formerly based in New York City, then Los Angeles, he later relocated to Austin, Texas.

== Early life and education ==
Swanger grew up in Lancaster, Pennsylvania. He graduated from the Groton School and cum laude from Yale University.

== Career ==
Swanger’s painting, Study after Tintoretto is included in The Art of Drawing, by Bernard Chaet.

One of Swanger's early exhibitions took place in 1981 at the Community Gallery of Lancaster County, now the Lancaster Museum of Art. The exhibit featured artwork by Ellen Arnold Groff, Jerome Hershey and John Swanger.

Swanger's work was exhibited at Marion Art in Lancaster, PA in 1981, 1984 and 1985.

In 1990, Swanger's paintings were presented in a group show at the Matthew Scott Fine Art gallery in Los Angeles, CA.

In 1993, 1997 and 1998, Swanger exhibited paintings at Kiyo Higashi Gallery in Los Angeles. The 1993 paintings involved wood-and-paint paintings, including fabric screens stretched across the surfaces of wooden boards. The 1997 works were a series of silver monochrome paintings which featured the word epiphyllum inscribed across their surfaces. The 1998 works presented new diptych paintings made with lead and acrylic paint.

In 1994, Swanger had a solo exhibition at John Weber Gallery, in the Project Room, in New York, NY.

In 1995, Swanger's work was included in Material Dreams, a group exhibition at the Gallery at Takashimaya, New York City. The exhibition featured artists including Han Feng, Ava Gerber, Jim Hodges, and Beverly Semmes. An accompanying catalogue—published as an artist’s book—contained essays by Lynn Gumpert and Richard Martin. Martin described Swanger’s work in relation to painterly abstraction and layered visual perception. Martin wrote, "Swanger's art seeks to reconcile the complicated and beautiful field that is a painterly realm."

Also in 1995, Swanger showed in the group exhibition Color + Structure with artists Sean Scully, Robert Mangold, Walter De Maria, Fredric Matys Thursz, Mitja Tusek, and Richard Tuttle at Galerie Lelong in NY, NY.

Swanger's work has been shown in group exhibitions at Thomas Solomon's Garage, Margo Leavin Gallery, Dennis Anderson Gallery, and Kiyo Higashi Gallery in Los Angeles, Jose Freire Fine Art in New York, and Vaughan & Vaughan in Minneapolis.

Swanger was selected for the 2009 Texas Biennial, curated by Michael Duncan.

In 2014, Swanger and his artwork were included in New American Paintings, curated by Nora Burnett Abrams of the Museum of Contemporary Art Denver.

Also in 2014, The Frank M. Doyle Arts Pavilion, Orange Coast College, in Costa Mesa, CA exhibited Swanger's work in Distilled Essence, Selected Artwork From The Kiyo Higashi Gallery. Featured artists included Peery Araeipour, Larry Bell, Max Cole, William Dwyer, Scot Heywood, Carol Kaufman, Lies Kraal, Penelope Krebs, Florence Pierce, Marcia Roberts, Michael Rouillard, Swanger, Roy Thurston, Carolee Toon, and Guy Williams.

Swanger was a 2016 finalist for the Hunting Art Prize.

In 2017, Swanger exhibited work in Lumens & Currents, a two-person show with Elizabeth Chiles at grayDUCK Gallery in Austin, Texas. The exhibition featured Swanger’s mixed-media works including #55 & 57, described by The Austin Chronicle as “large varnished pieces, ‘paper on linen,’ painted with baby blue and slightly rosy shades.” The reviewer noted the works’ topographical surfaces and observed that Swanger’s work reflected themes of nature and ethereality. The exhibition featured Swanger’s paintings and Chiles’ photo-based work.

His works were gifted to the Hammer Museum by Margo Leavin.

A diptych by Swanger titled Black Green Square, acrylic and collage on canvas, was at the Museum of Contemporary Art Los Angeles. It was acquired by John Moran Auctioneers and sold in auction in 2021.

Swanger's work displayed in group shows at the Site: Brooklyn gallery, the exhibition Shape/Form/Structure curated by Elizabeth Rooklidge, in 2023 and the exhibition Collage/Assemblage curated by Regine Basha in 2024.

== Personal life ==
From 1998 to 2008, Swanger served the Zen Center Los Angeles in multiple capacities, including as a board member, executive circle, meditation instructor, and assistant teacher. He is sometimes mentioned with his dharma name included, as John Plum-Hermit Swanger.
