= How to Kill Your Neighbor's Dog =

- Theatrical release poster
- Directed by: Michael Kalesniko
- Written by: Michael Kalesniko
- Produced by: Michael Nozik; Nancy M. Ruff; Brad Weston
- Starring: Kenneth Branagh; Robin Wright Penn; Jared Harris; Lynn Redgrave; David Krumholtz
- Cinematography: Hubert Taczanowski
- Edited by: Pamela Martin
- Music by: David Robbins
- Distributed by: Lonsdale Productions
- Release dates: September 16, 2000 (Toronto); February 22, 2002 (United States; limited)
- Running time: 107 minutes
- Country: United States
- Language: English
- Budget: $7.3 million
- Box office: $73,510

How to Kill Your Neighbor's Dog is a 2000 American black comedy film written and directed by Michael Kalesniko. It stars Kenneth Branagh and Robin Wright Penn.

== Plot ==
Peter McGowan is a chain-smoking, impotent, insomniac British playwright who lives in Los Angeles. Once very successful, he is now in the tenth year of a decade-long string of production failures. His latest play is in the hands of effeminate director Brian Sellars, who is obsessed with Petula Clark; his wife Melanie is determined to have a baby; he finds himself bonding with a new neighbor's lonely young daughter who has mild cerebral palsy; and during one of his middle-of-the-night strolls, he encounters his oddball doppelgänger who claims to be Peter McGowan and develops a friendship of sorts with him.

== Cast ==
- Kenneth Branagh as Peter McGowen
- Robin Wright Penn as Melanie McGowen
- Jared Harris as "Pseudo"/"False" Peter McGowen
- Suzi Hofrichter as Amy Walsh
- Lynn Redgrave as Edna
- Peter Riegert as Larry
- David Krumholtz as Brian Sellars
- Johnathon Schaech as Adam
- Kaitlin Hopkins as Victoria
- Suzy Joachim as Allana
- Brett Rickaby as Janitor
- Lucinda Jenney as Trina Walsh
- Derek Kellock as Amy's Father
- Stacy Hogue as Babysitter
- Peri Gilpin as Debra Salhany

== Production ==
Petula Clark's recordings of "I Couldn't Live Without Your Love" and "A Groovy Kind of Love" were heard during the opening and closing credits respectively, and "Downtown 99", a disco remix of her 1964 classic "Downtown", was heard during a party scene. Additional songs originally recorded by Petula Clark were sung by the character of Brian Sellars throughout the film.

== Reception ==
The film holds a 59% approval rating on Rotten Tomatoes, based on 34 reviews.

In his review for The New York Times, Stephen Holden described the film as "a Hollywood rarity, a movie about an icy grown-up heart-warmed by a child that doesn't wield emotional pliers to try to squeeze out tears…. It is a tribute to Mr. Branagh's considerable comic skills that he succeeds in making a potentially insufferable character likable by infusing him with the same sly charm that Michael Caine musters to seduce us into cozying up to his sleazier alter egos…. Mr. Kalesniko's satirically barbed screenplay, whose spirit harks back to the comic heyday of Blake Edwards, stirs up an insistent verbal energy that rarely flags."

Owen Gleiberman of Entertainment Weekly gave the movie a B and said, "Branagh, in his most forceful non-Shakespeare screen performance, grounds even the softest moments in the angry revolt of his wit." Justine Elias of The Village Voice stated it was "slight but unendurable…its fractured time frame gets confusing".

The film was the closing night film at the 2000 Toronto International Film Festival and won multiple festival awards. It was released as Mad Dogs and Englishmen in Australia.
