= Nevermind It's an Interview =

Nevermind, It's an Interview

Live album by Nirvana
- Released: 1992
- Recorded: January 12, 1992
- Genre: Grunge; alternative rock; punk rock
- Label: Geffen
- Producer: Kurt St. Thomas, Troy Smith

Nirvana chronology
Nevermind (1991)	Nevermind, It's an Interview (1992)	Hormoaning (1992)

Nevermind It's an Interview is the only officially released interview CD of American grunge band Nirvana. It was a promotional release and was never commercially available.

== Original release ==
Released in limited-edition form worldwide in 1992 by Geffen Records, written, produced and engineered at WFNX Boston by Kurt St. Thomas and Troy Smith, (authors of Nirvana: The Chosen Rejects, (St. Martin's Press, 2004). The original interview sessions were recorded by St. Thomas the night of Nirvana's first appearance on NBC's Saturday Night Live in 1992. It contains over an hour of audio interview with live and studio recordings. The reason for its production was for radio stations world-wide to have a Nirvana interview to play because at that time the band was so popular that it was not possible for them to visit all the radio stations that were playing their music. Copies of the CD are rare and have become collector's items.

== Re-releases ==
In 1996, it was released as part of a limited edition promotional CD box set in Australia for promotion of Nirvana's live album, From the Muddy Banks of the Wishkah. The box set was limited to 3,000 copies.

For a limited time, the entire CD was included at the end of the iTunes version of With the Lights Out, Nirvana's posthumous rarities box set, released in 2004. It is listed as:

1. "Nevermind It's an Interview, Pt.1"
2. "Nevermind It's an Interview, Pt.2"
3. "Nevermind It's an Interview, Pt.3"

== Track listing ==
All songs are incomplete unless otherwise noted. The live versions of "Drain You" and "School" were released on some versions of the "Come as You Are" single in 1992. The back cover reads: "Kurt St Thomas, Music director of WFNX, Boston, speaks with Kurt Cobain, Krist Novoselic and Dave Grohl about life in Nirvana, circa 1992."

Track 1:

- "Breed"
- "Stay Away"
- "School"
- "Mr. Moustache"
- "Sifting"
- "In Bloom"
- "Spank Thru"
- "Floyd the Barber"
- "Scoff"
- "Love Buzz"
- "About a Girl" (live, full - 10/31/91 - Paramount Theatre, Seattle, WA)
- "Dive"
- "Sliver"
- "Aneurysm" (live, full - 10/31/91 - Paramount Theatre, Seattle, WA)

Track 2:

- "Lithium"
- "Even in His Youth"
- "Drain You" (live, full - 10/31/91 - Paramount Theatre, Seattle, WA)
- "Something in the Way"
- "Come as You Are"
- "Polly"
- "In Bloom"
- "Smells Like Teen Spirit"
- "On a Plain" (live, full - 10/31/91 - Paramount Theatre, Seattle, WA)
- "Stay Away"
- "Endless, Nameless" (live, full - 10/31/91 - Paramount Theatre, Seattle, WA)

Track 3:

- "Molly's Lips" (live, 02/09/90 - Pine Street Theatre, Portland, OR)
- "Stain"
- "School" (live, full - 10/31/91 - Paramount Theatre, Seattle, WA)
- "Big Cheese"
- "Been a Son"
- "Territorial Pissings" (full)
- "Smells Like Teen Spirit" (full)

== See also ==
- Nevermind
- Classic Albums: Nirvana – Nevermind
- Nirvana discography
