= D.O.A. (1949 film) =

1949 film by Rudolph Maté

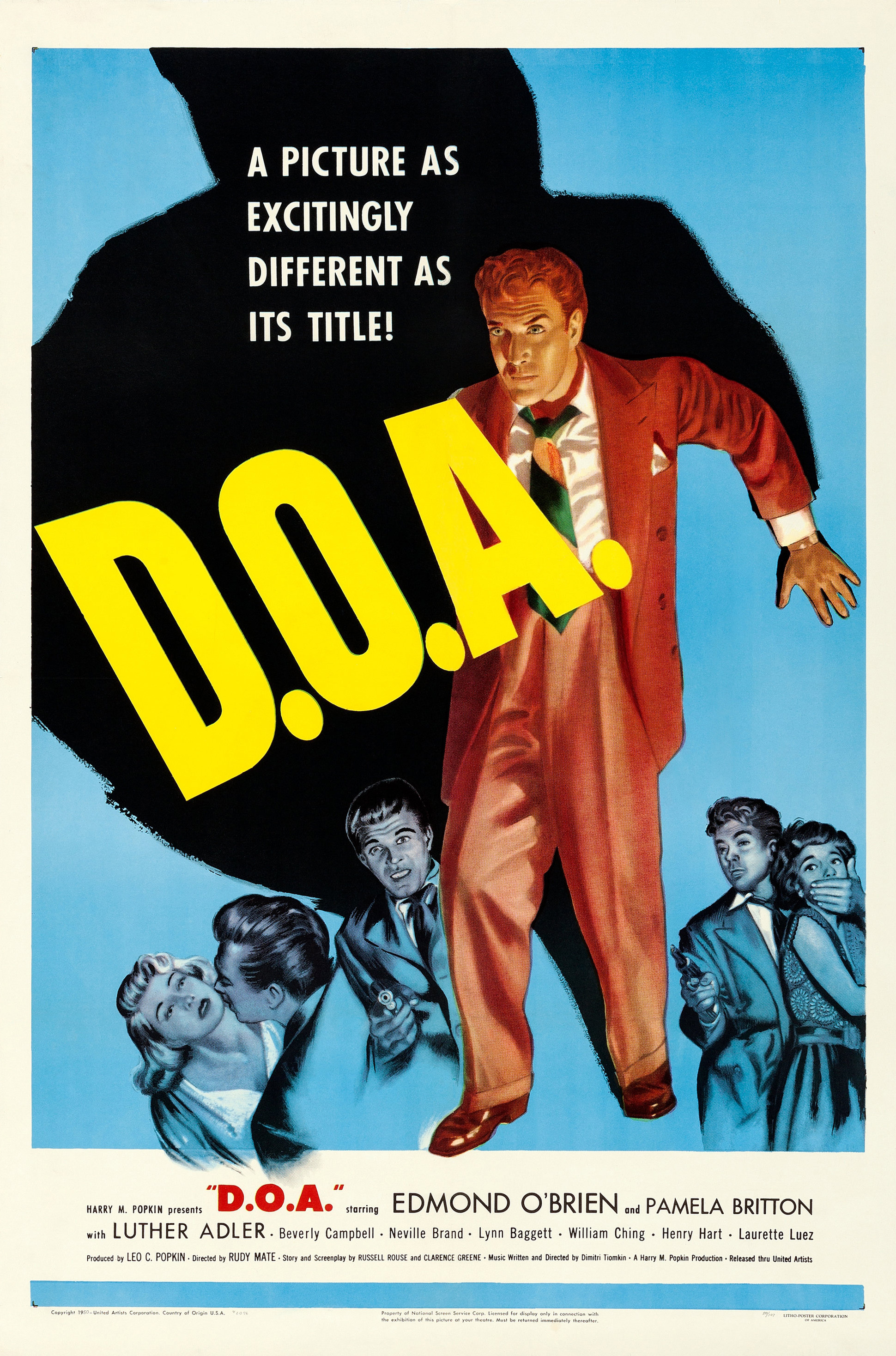
- Theatrical release poster
- Directed by: Rudolph Maté
- Written by: Russell Rouse; Clarence Greene
- Produced by: Leo C. Popkin
- Starring: Edmond O'Brien; Pamela Britton; Luther Adler; Beverly Campbell; Neville Brand; Lynn Baggett; William Ching; Henry Hart; Laurette Luez
- Cinematography: Ernest Laszlo
- Edited by: Arthur H. Nadel
- Music by: Dimitri Tiomkin
- Color process: Black and white
- Production companies: Harry Popkin Productions; Cardinal Pictures
- Distributed by: United Artists
- Release dates: December 23, 1949 (Los Angeles); April 21, 1950 (USA)
- Running time: 84 minutes
- Country: United States
- Language: English

D.O.A.

D.O.A. is a 1949 American film noir directed by Rudolph Maté, starring Edmond O'Brien and Pamela Britton. It is considered a classic of the genre. A fatally poisoned man tries to find out who has poisoned him and why. It was the film debuts of Beverly Garland (as Beverly Campbell) and Laurette Luez. In 2004, D.O.A. was selected for preservation in the United States National Film Registry by the Library of Congress as being "culturally, historically, or aesthetically significant".

Leo C. Popkin produced D.O.A. for his short-lived Cardinal Pictures. Due to a filing error, the copyright to the film was not renewed on time, causing it to fall into the public domain: it was subsequently remade as Color Me Dead (1969), D.O.A. (1988), Dead on Arrival (2017), and D.O.A. (2022).

== Plot ==
An opening sequence features Frank Bigelow walking through the long hallway of a police station to report his own murder. From here to the end, the story is told in flashback. Bigelow is a hard-driving accountant and notary public in Banning, California, who decides, to the chagrin of his secretary, Paula, who is in love with him, to escape alone for a fun vacation in San Francisco. At the hotel, he is invited to join a group of conventioneers for a night out. He ends up at a nightclub, where unnoticed, a stranger swaps his drink for another one. The next morning, he feels extremely ill. Doctors determine that he had ingested poison, a "luminous toxin", for which no antidote is known.

With only days to live, Bigelow embarks on a desperate search to discover the motive for his poisoning. A call to Paula provides a possible lead; a Eugene Philips has been urgently trying to contact him. Bigelow travels to Philips' import-export company in Los Angeles, meeting Halliday, the company comptroller, who says that Philips has committed suicide.

Bigelow locates Eugene Philips' widow and brother Stanley Philips. Months earlier, Eugene had purchased iridium, a rare, platinum-like metallic element, which had been stolen by a criminal named Majak. The seller was a George Reynolds (or Raymond Rakubian), Majak's nephew. As a result of this illegal sale/purchase transaction, Eugene Philips faced criminal charges.

The bill of sale would have cleared Eugene, but it has gone missing, and that document had been notarized by Bigelow himself. He learns that Reynolds/Rakubian is now dead. He realizes that someone seems intent on eliminating all evidence of this sale.

That someone turns out, in a plot twist, to be Halliday. Stanley Phillips, who has now been poisoned, reveals that Eugene discovered that his wife and Halliday were having an affair. Mrs. Philips affirms that during a confrontation that turned violent, Halliday threw Eugene over a balcony. To make it look like suicide, the pair insisted that Eugene had killed himself over his legal troubles. When they discovered that exonerating evidence of his innocence existed in the notarized iridium bill of sale, Halliday began disposing of anyone knowing about the document, and that led to Bigelow.

In the final scene, Bigelow tracks Halliday to the Philips company and finds him wearing the same distinctive coat and scarf as the man who switched the drinks. Halliday draws a gun and fires first, but Bigelow fatally shoots him.

Bigelow finishes telling his story and dies. The police detective taking down the report instructs that his file be marked "dead on arrival".

== Cast ==
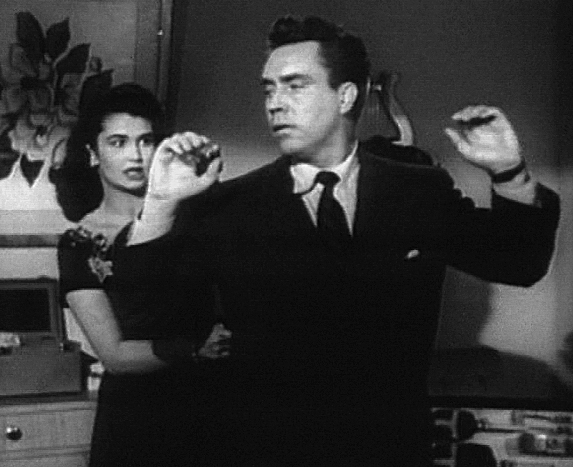
Marla Rakubian threatens Bigelow when he comes to her for information.

Edmond O'Brien as Frank Bigelow	Pamela Britton as Paula Gibson
Luther Adler as Majak	Lynne Baggett as Mrs. Phillips
William Ching as Halliday	Henry Hart as Stanley Phillips
Beverly Garland as Miss Foster (as Beverly Campbell)	Neville Brand as Chester
Laurette Luez as Marla Rakubian	Virginia Lee as Jeannie

Additional cast members:

- Jess Kirkpatrick as Sam
- Cay Forrester as Sue
- Frank Jaquet as Dr. Matson
- Lawrence Dobkin as Dr. Schaefer
- Frank Gerstle as Dr. MacDonald
- Carol Hughes as Kitty
- Frank Cady as Eddie the bartender in Banning (uncredited)
- Michael Ross as Dave the bartender in San Francisco
- Donna Sanborn as the nurse

== Production ==
The shot of Edmond O'Brien running down Market Street (between 4th and 6th Streets) in San Francisco was a "stolen shot", taken without city permits, with some pedestrians visibly confused as O'Brien bumps into them.

D.O.A. producer Harry Popkin owned the Million Dollar Theater at the southwest corner of Broadway and Third Street in downtown Los Angeles, directly across the street from the Bradbury Building at 304 South Broadway, where O'Brien's character confronted his murderer. Director Rudolph Maté liberally used Broadway and the Bradbury Building during location shooting and included the Million Dollar Theater's blazing marquee in the background. The theater would later serve the same function when Ridley Scott filmed Blade Runner at the Bradbury Building.

After "The End" and before the listing of the cast, a credit states that the medical aspects of this film are based on scientific fact and that "luminous toxin is a descriptive term for an actual poison".

The bop jazz band playing at the Fisherman's Club while O'Brien's glass is being spiked was filmed on a Los Angeles soundstage after principal photography was completed. According to Jim Dawson in his 1995 book Nervous Man Nervous: Big Jay McNeely and the Rise of the Honking Tenor Sax, the sweating tenor saxophone player was James Streeter, also known as James Von Streeter. Other band members were Shifty Henry (bass), Al "Cake" Wichard (drums), Ray LaRue (piano), and Teddy Buckner (trumpet). However, rather than use the live performance, the music director went back and rerecorded the soundtrack with a big band, not a quintet as seen in the film, led by saxophonist Maxwell Davis. Film score was composed by Dimitri Tiomkin.

== Reception ==
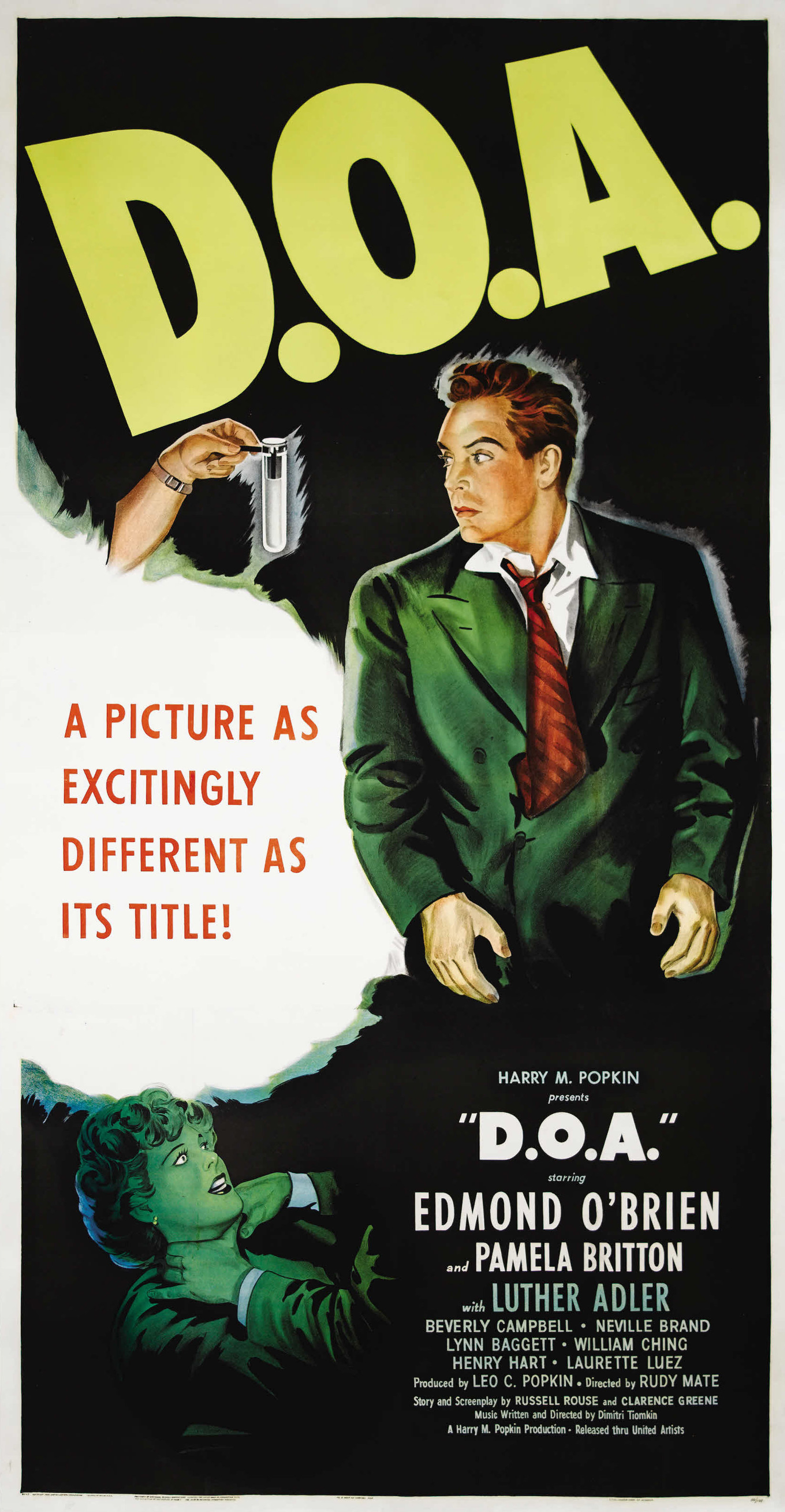
Alternate theatrical release poster

=== Critical reception ===
On Rotten Tomatoes the film has an approval rating of 89% based on reviews from 28 critics.

The New York Times, in its May 1950 review, described it as a "fairly obvious and plodding recital, involving crime, passion, stolen iridium, gangland beatings and one man's innocent bewilderment upon being caught up in a web of circumstance that marks him for death". O'Brien's performance had a "good deal of drive", while Britton adds a "pleasant touch of blonde attractiveness".

In 1981 Foster Hirsch carried on a trend of more positive reviews, calling Bigelow's search for his own killer noir irony at its blackest. He wrote: "One of the film's many ironies is that his last desperate search involves him in his life more forcefully than he has ever been before... Tracking down his killer just before he dies — discovering the reason for his death — turns out to be the triumph of his life." Critic A. K. Rode notes Rudolph Maté's technical background, writing:

D.O.A. reflects the photographic roots of director Rudolph Maté. He compiled an impressive resume as a cinematographer in Hollywood from 1935 (Dante's Inferno, Stella Dallas, The Adventures of Marco Polo, Foreign Correspondent, Pride of the Yankees, and Gilda, among others) until turning to directing in 1947. The lighting, locations, and atmosphere of brooding darkness were captured expertly by Mate and director of photography Ernest Lazlo.

David Wood of the BBC described the opening as "perhaps one of cinema's most innovative opening sequences". Eddie Muller pointed out that the film "is a close as any noir got to being a live-action cartoon. Realizing the plot is little more than a succession of gab-happy interrogations, director Rudolph Maté gave Edmond O'Brien free rein to push things to a fever pitch. He responded with more animation than Daffy Duck." Michael Sragow, in a Salon web review (2000) of a DVD release of the film, characterized it as a "high-concept movie before its time". Leonard Maltin's Movie Guide (2008) gave D.O.A. 3½ stars out of 4.

=== Accolades ===
In 2004, D.O.A. was selected for preservation in the United States National Film Registry by the Library of Congress as being "culturally, historically, or aesthetically significant".

The film was nominated for two American Film Institute lists:

- 2001: AFI's 100 Years...100 Thrills
- 2008: AFI's 10 Top 10 mystery

== Remakes and influence ==
The March 16, 1951, radio episode of The Adventures of Sam Spade features a victim reporting his own murder at police headquarters. D.O.A. was dramatized as an hour-long radio play on the June 21, 1951, broadcast of Screen Director's Playhouse, starring Edmond O'Brien in his original role.

The film has been remade five times:

- In Australia in 1969 as Color Me Dead, directed by Eddie Davis. Because copyright had lapsed, Color Me Dead was basically an exact copy of D.O.A.
- In 1988, a new version was released as D.O.A., directed by Annabel Jankel and Rocky Morton, with Dennis Quaid as the protagonist.
- In 2006, a modernised action thriller version was released as Crank.
- In 2017, a new version was released as Dead On Arrival.
- In 2022, a new version was released as D.O.A., directed by Kurt St. Thomas with John Doe as the protagonist.

In 2011, the Overtime Theater staged a world-premiere musical based on the classic film noir. D.O.A. a Noir Musical was written and adapted by Jon Gillespie and Matthew Byron Cassi, directed by Cassi, with original jazz and blues music composed by Jaime Ramirez and lyrics by Ramirez and Gillespie. The new musical played to sold-out audiences during its five-week run, and received two ATAC Globe Awards in 2012 for "Best Adapted Script" and "Best Original Score".

== See also ==
- List of films in the public domain in the United States
