= 6Gig =

American rock band

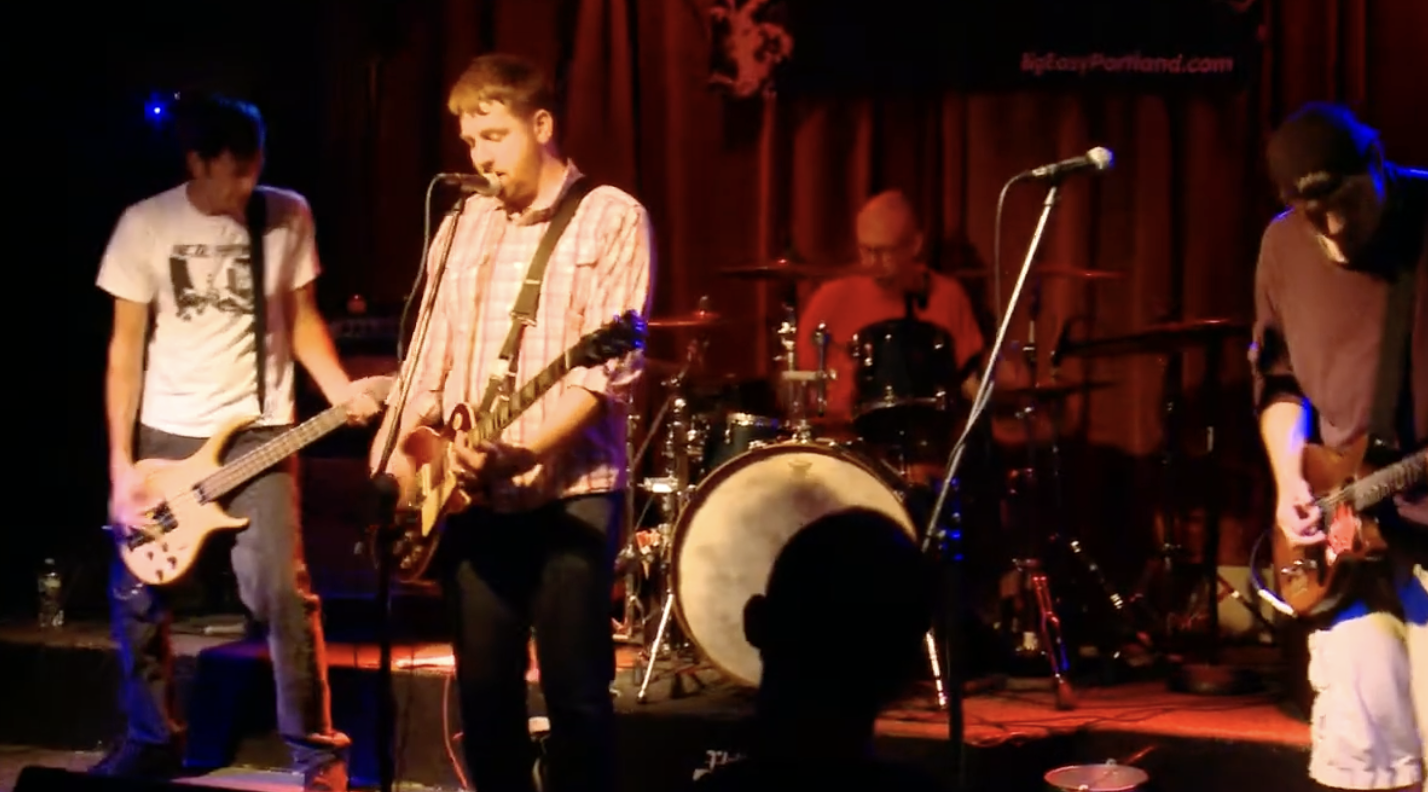
- 6Gig performing at The Big Easy in Portland, Maine, 2013.

Background information
- Origin: Portland, Maine, United States
- Genres: Alternative rock, alternative metal, post-grunge, nu metal
- Years active: 2000–2005; 2008; 2011–2015
- Label: Ultimatum
- Past members: Walter Craven; Steve Marquis; Craig Weaver; Jason Stewart; Dave Rankin (deceased)

6Gig was an American rock band from Portland, Maine. It is classified by reviewers as alternative rock and nu metal. They actively played at clubs and different locations throughout New England. They released two CDs and several singles, as well as a video for the song "Hit the Ground" that received airplay on MTV2. Before the release of "Mind Over Mind", the band parted ways with drummer Dave Rankin and was joined by drummer Jason Stewart. Shortly after this, Rankin was found dead from a mixture of prescription drugs and alcohol.

"Hit the Ground" was 6Gig's biggest hit. It appeared on the National Lampoon's Van Wilder soundtrack, Ozzfest 2001 Summer Sampler and various compilation albums. On the 2005 album Beautiful Locals, released on Labor Day Records, a compilation album of cover songs from Maine bands and artists, Paranoid Social Club, another Maine rock band, covers "Hit The Ground". The original song was also featured as a clip of music in an episode of MTV's Pimp My Ride, and as a soundtrack tune on NHL Hitz 2002 for the Xbox and GameCube.

Due to financial troubles at Ultimatum Music, "Mind Over Mind" never received an official release, instead being sold only over the label's website. This decision led the band to put the entire "Mind Over Mind" album online for free download in the summer of 2004 for a short time. The band separated in 2005 and its members joined other bands, including singer Walter Craven in Lost on Liftoff and Jason Stewart in Sidecar Radio.

6Gig reunited for two shows at The Big Easy in Portland, Maine during May 2–3, 2008. They reunited again in Portland on July 1, 2011, for a show at The Asylum. they began playing shows regularly. The band released an EP called Dogs in 2013, and have been inactive since 2015.

== Members ==
=== Past members ===
- Walter Craven – vocals, guitar (2000–2005, 2008, 2011–2015)
- Steve Marquis – guitar, backing vocals (2000–2005, 2008, 2011–2015)
- Craig Weaver – bass (2000–2005, 2008, 2011–2015)
- Jason Stewart – drums (2003–2005, 2008, 2011–2015)
- Dave Rankin – drums (2000–2003)

== Discography ==
=== Albums ===
| Title | Released | Label |
|---|---|---|
| Tincan Experiment | October 23, 2000 | Ultimatum |
| Mind Over Mind | July 1, 2003 | Ultimatum |

=== EPs ===
| Title | Released | Label |
|---|---|---|
| Broadcast.Trans:MISSION.red | September 13, 2002 | Ultimatum |
| Bind | January 1, 2013 | Ultimatum |
| Dogs | January 23, 2013 | Sixth Of Sense |
