= Ava Gerber =

Ava Gerber (born 1961) is an American artist. Her work is included in the collections of the Whitney Museum of American Art, the Museum of Contemporary Art, Los Angeles and the Museum of Modern Art, New York.
