= Nevermind =

Studio album by Nirvana
- Released: September 24, 1991
- Recorded: May 2–28, 1991; June 1–9, 1991 (mixing); April 1990 (Note: "Polly")
- Studios: Sound City (Van Nuys); Smart (Madison, Wisconsin)
- Genres: Grunge; alternative rock
- Length: 42:36 (49:07 with hidden track)
- Labels: DGC; Sub Pop
- Producers: Butch Vig; Nirvana

Nirvana chronology
Blew (1989)	Nevermind (1991)	Nevermind It's an Interview (1992)

Singles from Nevermind
- 1. "Smells Like Teen Spirit" Released: September 10, 1991; 2. "Come as You Are" Released: February 18, 1992; 3. "Lithium" Released: July 13, 1992; 4. "In Bloom" Released: November 30, 1992

Nevermind is the second studio album by American rock band Nirvana, released on September 24, 1991, by DGC Records. Produced by Butch Vig, Nevermind features a more polished, radio-friendly sound than the band's prior work. It was recorded at Sound City Studios in Van Nuys, California, and Smart Studios in Madison, Wisconsin, in May and June 1991, and mastered that August at the Mastering Lab in Hollywood, California. Nevermind was Nirvana's first album to feature drummer Dave Grohl.

Written primarily by frontman Kurt Cobain, the album's lyrical themes include social alienation and frustration, anti-establishment and feminist views, and relationship issues; these were more sensitive compared to what was common in mainstream rock music at the time. Musically rooted in grunge and alternative rock, the album also features acoustic ballads and punk-inspired hard rock.

Nevermind was an unexpected success, topping the Billboard 200 in January 1992. The lead single, "Smells Like Teen Spirit", reached the Top 10 of the Billboard Hot 100 and was later inducted into the Grammy Hall of Fame. The singles "Come as You Are", "Lithium", and "In Bloom" were also successful. Nevermind was voted the best album of the year in Pazz & Jop critics' poll, while "Smells Like Teen Spirit" also topped the single-of-the-year and video-of-the-year polls. It was nominated for three Grammy Awards, including Best Alternative Music Album.

Nevermind brought Nirvana worldwide fame, with Cobain dubbed by many as the "voice of his generation". The album is generally credited with bringing grunge and alternative rock to a mainstream audience, accelerating the decline of hair metal, and initiating a resurgence of punk culture among the youth of Generation X. Nevermind has sold more than 30 million copies worldwide, making it one of the best-selling albums of all time. In 2024, it was certified 13× platinum by the Recording Industry Association of America. Nevermind was added by the Library of Congress to the National Recording Registry in 2004 as "culturally, historically, or aesthetically significant", and frequently appears on lists of the greatest albums.

== Background and early sessions ==
In early 1990, Nirvana began planning their second album for their record company Sub Pop, tentatively titled Sheep. At the suggestion of Sub Pop head Bruce Pavitt, Nirvana selected Butch Vig as producer. The band particularly liked Vig's work with Killdozer. They traveled to Vig's Smart Studios in Madison, Wisconsin, and recorded from April 2 to 6, 1990. Most of the basic arrangements were complete, but songwriter Kurt Cobain was still working on lyrics and the band was unsure of which songs to record. Ultimately, eight were recorded, some of which were later rerecorded for Nevermind: "Imodium" (later renamed "Breed"), "Dive" (later released as the B-side to "Sliver"), "In Bloom", "Pay to Play" (later renamed "Stay Away"), "Sappy", "Lithium", "Here She Comes Now" (released on Heaven & Hell: A Tribute to the Velvet Underground), and "Polly".

On April 6, Nirvana played a local show in Madison with the Seattle band Tad. Vig began to mix the recordings while the band gave an interview to Madison's community radio station WORT on April 7. Cobain strained his voice, forcing Nirvana to end the recording. On April 8, they traveled to Milwaukee to begin an extensive Midwest and East Coast tour of 24 shows in 39 days.

The drummer Chad Channing left after the tour, putting additional recording on hold. During a show by the hardcore punk band Scream, Cobain and the bassist Krist Novoselic were impressed by their drummer Dave Grohl. When Scream unexpectedly disbanded, Grohl contacted Novoselic, traveled to Seattle, and was invited to join the band. Novoselic said in retrospect that, with Grohl, everything "fell into place".

By the 1990s, Sub Pop was having financial problems. With rumors that they would become a subsidiary of a major record label, Nirvana decided to "cut out the middleman" and look for a major record label. Nirvana used the recordings as a demo tape to shop for a new label. Within a few months, the tape was circulating among major labels. A number of labels courted them; Nirvana signed with Geffen Records imprint DGC Records based on recommendations from Kim Gordon of Sonic Youth and their management company.

After Nirvana signed to DGC, a number of producers were suggested, including Scott Litt, David Briggs, Don Dixon, and Bob Mould. Novoselic said the band had been nervous about recording under a major label, and the producers suggested by DGC wanted percentage points. Instead, the band held out for Vig, with whom they felt comfortable collaborating.

== Recording ==
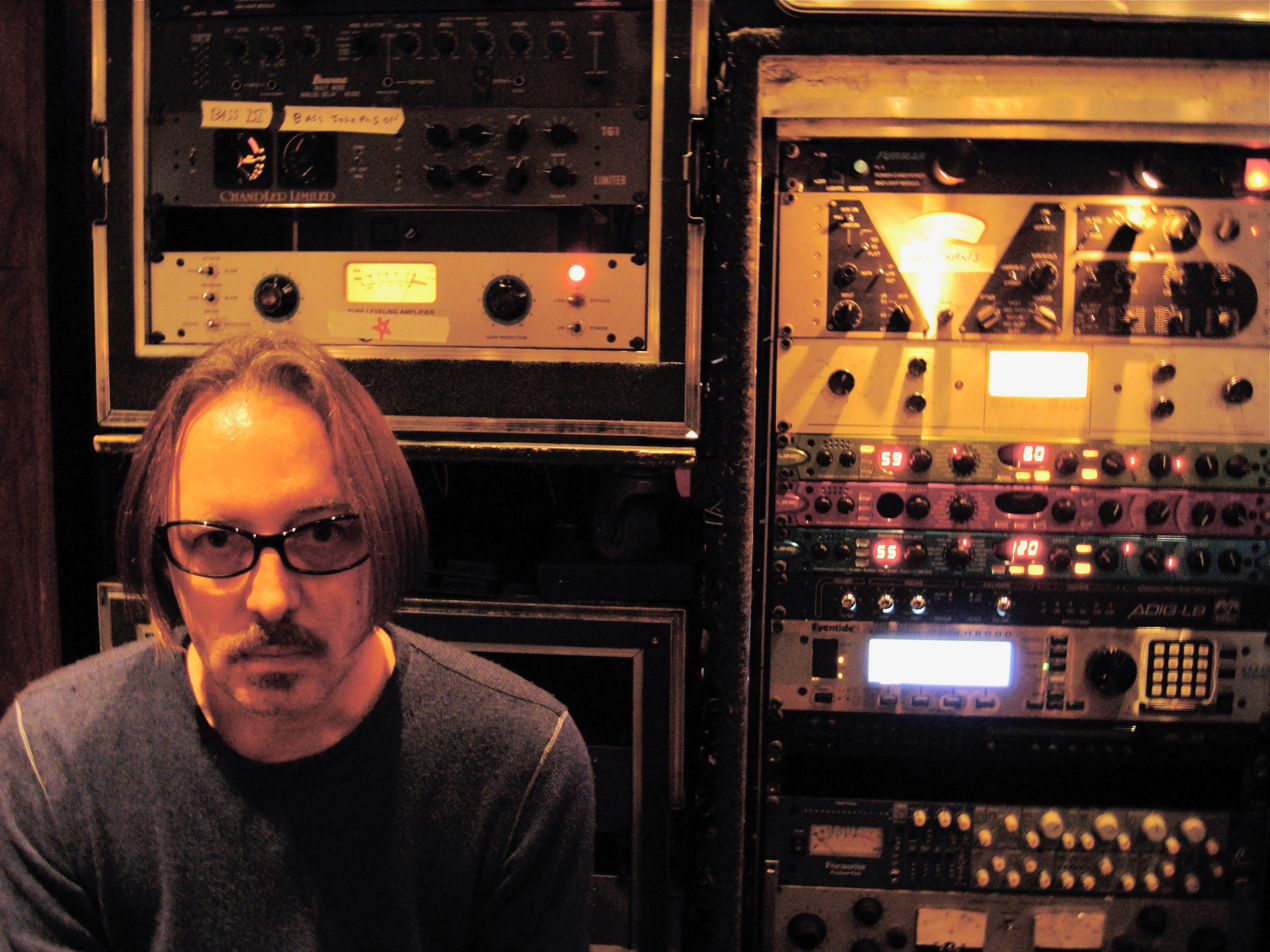
Producer Butch Vig in 2006

With a budget of $65,000, Nirvana recorded Nevermind at Sound City Studios in Van Nuys, California, in May and June 1991. To earn gas money to get to Los Angeles, they played a show at Seattle's OK Hotel on April 17, 1991 where they performed "Smells Like Teen Spirit" for the first time. The band sent Vig rehearsal tapes prior to the sessions that featured songs recorded previously at Smart Studios, plus new songs including "Smells Like Teen Spirit" and "Come as You Are".

Nirvana arrived in California and spent a few days rehearsing and working on arrangements. The only recording carried over from the Smart Studios sessions was "Polly", including Channing's cymbal crashes. Once recording commenced, the band worked eight to ten hours a day.

Despite receiving a $287,000 advance upon signing with Geffen, Cobain retained a preference for inexpensive equipment—particularly Japanese-made Fender guitars, due to their skinny necks and wider availability in lefthanded orientation. These included several Stratocasters fitted with humbucker pickups in the bridge positions, as well as a 1965 Jaguar with DiMarzio pickups and a 1969 Mustang, the latter of which Cobain cited as his favorite due to its design flaws. For the album, Cobain bought a rackmount system featuring a Mesa/Boogie Studio preamp, a Crown power amp, and Marshall cabinets. He also used a Vox AC30 and a Fender Bassman. Vig preferred not to use pedals, but he allowed Cobain to use a Boss DS-1 distortion pedal, which Cobain considered a key part of his sound, as well as an Electro-Harmonix Big Muff fuzz pedal and a Small Clone chorus.

Novoselic and Grohl finished their tracks in days, while Cobain worked longer on guitar overdubs, vocals, and lyrics. He sometimes finished lyrics minutes before recording. Vig recalled that Cobain was often reluctant to record overdubs, but he was persuaded to double-track his vocals when Vig told him that John Lennon did it. Though the sessions generally went well, Vig said Cobain would become difficult at times: "He'd be great for an hour, and then he'd sit in a corner and say nothing for an hour."

=== Mixing and mastering ===
Vig and the band were unhappy with Vig's initial mixes and decided to bring in someone else to oversee the mixing. DGC supplied a list of options, including Scott Litt, known for his work with R.E.M., and Ed Stasium, known for his work with the Ramones and the Smithereens. Cobain was concerned about bringing in well known producers, and instead chose Andy Wallace, who had co-produced Slayer's 1990 album Seasons in the Abyss. Novoselic recalled, "We said, 'Right on,' because those Slayer records were so heavy."

Wallace's mixes most notably altered the drum and guitar to create a more polished sound. Wallace used kick and snare samples to drive reverb sounds, as opposed to replacing the original sounds. According to Wallace and Vig, the band loved the results. However, they criticized it after the album was released. Steve Albini, who engineered Nirvana's next album, In Utero (1993), said Vig's initial mix "sounded maybe 200 times more ass-kicking" than the final version of Nevermind and that Nirvana referred to it while working on In Utero. He said that Vig was an excellent engineer who "had a good, sympathetic relationship with all the noisy bands he recorded in the 80s", which was why Nirvana had hired him.

Nevermind was mastered by Howie Weinberg on the afternoon of August 2 at the Mastering Lab in Hollywood, California. Weinberg started working alone when no one else arrived at the appointed time in the studio; by the time Nirvana, Andy Wallace, and Gary Gersh arrived, he had almost finished. A hidden track, "Endless, Nameless", intended to appear at the end of "Something in the Way", was accidentally left off initial pressings of the album. Weinberg recalled, "In the beginning, it was kind of a verbal thing to put that track at the end [...] Maybe I didn't write it down when Nirvana or the record company said to do it. So, when they pressed the first twenty thousand or so CDs, albums, and cassettes, it wasn't on there." Cobain called Weinberg and demanded he rectify the mistake.

== Music ==
"Smells Like Teen Spirit"
"Smells Like Teen Spirit", the album opener, illustrates the change in dynamics from verse to pre-chorus and chorus. The band maintains the chord progression throughout, relying on the changes in dynamics and the reintroduction of the main guitar riff at the end to indicate the shifts between sections.

"Come as You Are"
"Come as You Are", the second single from Nevermind. Guitarist Kurt Cobain uses a chorus pedal when playing his guitar, creating a "watery" effect.

At the time of writing Nevermind, Cobain was listening to bands such as Melvins, R.E.M., the Smithereens, and the Pixies, and was writing songs that were more melodic. A key development was the single "Sliver", released on Sub Pop in 1990 before Grohl joined, which Cobain said "was like a statement in a way. I had to write a pop song and release it on a single to prepare people for the next record. I wanted to write more songs like that." Grohl said that the band at that point likened their music to children's music, in that they tried to make their songs as simple as possible.

Cobain fashioned chord sequences using primarily power chords and wrote songs that combined pop hooks with dissonant guitar riffs. His aim for Nevermind's material was to sound like "the Knack and the Bay City Rollers getting molested by Black Flag and Black Sabbath". Many songs feature shifts in dynamics, whereby the band changes from quiet verses to loud choruses. Grohl said this approach originated during a four-month period prior to the recording of the album, when the band would experiment with extreme dynamics during regular jam sessions.

Guitar World wrote, "Kurt Cobain's guitar sound on Nirvana's Nevermind set the tone for Nineties rock music." Cobain played a 1960s Fender Mustang, a Fender Jaguar with DiMarzio pickups, and a few Fender Stratocasters with humbucker bridge pickups. He used distortion and chorus pedals as his main effects, the latter used to generate a "watery" sound on "Come as You Are" and the pre-choruses of "Smells Like Teen Spirit". Though the album is considered a cornerstone of the grunge genre, it is noted for its musical diversity, which includes acoustic ballads ("Polly" and "Something in the Way") and punk-influenced hard rock ("Territorial Pissings" and "Stay Away").

After the release of Nevermind, members of Nirvana expressed dissatisfaction with the production for its perceived commercial sound. Cobain said, "I'm embarrassed by it now. It's closer to a Mötley Crüe record than it is a punk rock record." In 2011, Vig said that Nirvana had "loved" Nevermind when they finished it. He said Cobain had criticized it in the press "because you can't really go, 'Hey, I love our record and I'm glad it sold 10 million copies.' That's just not cool to do. And I think he felt like he wanted to do something more primal."

=== Lyrics ===
The album is dark, humorous, and disturbing. It includes anti-establishment views, and explores sexism, frustration, loneliness, sickness, and troubled love. Cobain said that the lyrics were taken from two years of poetry he had accumulated, and then cut up, choosing lines he preferred, noting that they're "not usually thematic at all". On the other hand, Grohl has said that Cobain told him, "Music comes first and lyrics come second," and Grohl believes that above all Cobain focused on the melodies of his songs. Cobain was still working on the album's lyrics well into the recording of Nevermind. Additionally, Cobain's phrasing on the album is often difficult to understand. Vig asserted that clarity of Cobain's singing was not paramount, saying that "Even though you couldn't quite tell what he was singing about, you knew it was intense as hell." Cobain later complained when rock journalists attempted to decipher his singing and extract meaning from his lyrics, writing: "Why in the hell do journalists insist on coming up with a second-rate Freudian evaluation of my lyrics, when 90 percent of the time they've transcribed them incorrectly?"

Charles R. Cross asserted in his 2001 biography of Cobain, Heavier Than Heaven, that many of the songs written for Nevermind were about Cobain's dysfunctional relationship with Tobi Vail. After their relationship ended, Cobain began writing and painting violent scenes, many of which revealed a hatred for himself and others. Songs written during this period were less violent, but still reflected anger absent from Cobain's earlier songs. Cross wrote, "In the four months following their break-up, Kurt would write a half dozen of his most memorable songs, all of them about Tobi Vail." "Drain You" begins with the line, "One baby to another said 'I'm lucky to have met you,'" quoting what Vail had once told Cobain, and the line "It is now my duty to completely drain you" refers to the power Vail had over Cobain in their relationship. According to Novoselic, "'Lounge Act' is about Tobi," and the song contains the line "I'll arrest myself, I'll wear a shield," referring to Cobain having the K Records logo tattooed on his arm to impress Vail. Though "Lithium" had been written before Cobain knew Vail, the lyrics of the song were changed to reference her. Cobain also said in an interview with Musician that "some of my very personal experiences, like breaking up with girlfriends and having bad relationships, feeling that death void that the person in the song is feeling—very lonely, sick".

== Title ==
The branding for Nevermind

The tentative title Sheep was something Cobain created as an inside joke directed towards the people he expected to buy the album. He wrote a fake advertisement for Sheep in his journal that read "Because you want to not; because everyone else is." Novoselic said the inspiration for the title was the band's cynicism about the public's reaction to Operation Desert Storm. As recording ended, Cobain grew tired of the title and suggested to Novoselic that the album be named Nevermind. Cobain liked the title because it was a metaphor for his attitude on life and because it was grammatically incorrect. Sacagawea, after the Native American, was briefly considered so to reference the band's intentions for a more widespread impact compared to their previous studio album Bleach.

"Nevermind" appears on the album liner notes as the last word in a paragraph of lyric fragments that ends with "I found it hard, it was hard to find, oh well, whatever, nevermind" from "Smells Like Teen Spirit". The word "nevermind" also echoes the Sex Pistols' Never Mind the Bollocks, Here's the Sex Pistols, one of Cobain's favorite albums.

== Artwork ==
The album cover shows a naked baby boy swimming underwater with a U.S. dollar bill on a fishhook just out of his reach. According to Cobain, he conceived the idea while watching a television program on water births. Cobain mentioned it to Geffen's art director Robert Fisher, who found some stock footage of underwater births, but they were too graphic for the record company to use. Furthermore, the stock house that controlled the photo of a swimming baby that they chose wanted $7,500 a year for its use. Instead, Fisher sent a photographer, Kirk Weddle, to a pool for babies to take pictures. Five shots resulted and the band settled on the image of four-month-old Spencer Elden, the son of a friend of Weddle. Geffen was concerned that the infant's penis, visible in the photo, would cause offense, and prepared an alternate cover without it; they relented when Cobain said the only compromise he would accept would be a sticker covering the penis reading: "If you're offended by this, you must be a closet pedophile." The cover has since been recognized as one of the most famous album covers in popular music. On October 28, Weddle also photographed the entire band underwater for a promotional poster.

The back cover features a photograph of a rubber monkey in front of a collage created by Cobain. The collage features photos of raw beef from a supermarket advertisement, images from Dante's Inferno, and pictures of diseased vaginas from Cobain's collection of medical photos. Cobain noted, "If you look real close, there is a picture of Kiss in the back standing on a slab of beef." The album's liner notes contain no complete lyrics; instead, the liner contains random song lyrics and unused lyrical fragments that Cobain arranged into a poem.

A year later, "Weird Al" Yankovic parodied the artwork for his album Off the Deep End, replacing the baby with himself wearing a hidden bathing suit, and the dollar with a donut. He would later jokingly state "I never really anticipated going full-frontal on any of my album covers."

=== Spencer Elden lawsuits ===
In August 2021, Elden filed a lawsuit against Weddle, Cobain's estate, Grohl, and Novoselic, claiming that the use of his likeness on the album cover was made without his consent or that of his legal guardians, that it violated federal child pornography statutes, and that it resulted in "lifelong damages". Elden said that, by refusing to censor the artwork with a sticker, Nirvana had failed to protect him from child sexual exploitation. The lawsuit also stated that "Cobain chose the image depicting Spencer—like a sex worker—grabbing for a dollar bill that is positioned dangling from a fishhook in front of his nude body with his penis explicitly displayed".

Attorney Jamie White criticized the lawsuit as "frivolous" and "really offensive to the true victims" of child sexual abuse. Fordham Law School professor James Cohen said the context of the cover did not suggest pornography. In December, the defendants sought to dismiss the lawsuit, saying it was filed too late and that its claim that the image depicts sexual abuse was "not serious". They noted that Elden had "spent three decades profiting from his celebrity as the self-anointed 'Nirvana Baby'", having reenacted the artwork several times, and that he had the album title tattooed on his chest. They argued that the cover instead "evokes themes of greed, innocence, and the motif of the cherub in western art". After Elden's lawyers did not file an opposition, the lawsuit was dismissed by a judge on January 3, 2022. However, the judge did allow for future lawsuits.

Elden refiled again on January 14, 2022, amending the original suit by removing charges of child sex trafficking while arguing it was child pornography. On September 2, 2022, a judge ruled against Elden, saying he had waited too long to file the suit and cited a 10-year statute of limitations from the date the plaintiff becomes a legal adult at age 18, meaning Elden needed to file before he turned 28 (around 2019). In addition, the judge blocked any additional filings in the future, bringing the case to a "final" close at the district court level. On September 6, 2022, Elden appealed the dismissal of his case to the United States Court of Appeals for the Ninth Circuit. The Ninth Circuit heard oral argument on Elden's appeal on October 18, 2023. The court ruled in favor of Elden in December 2023, reversing the lower court's ruling and allowing the suit to continue. The court determined that the special republication of the album on its 30th anniversary constituted a new claim that Elden could pursue in court. Reheard at lower court, the judge found on October 1, 2025, that the image of the naked baby did not meet the definition of child pornography, as it had no sexually explicit content and was more akin to a family photo of a nude bathing baby, and dismissed Elden's suit. Elden appealed this ruling to the Ninth Circuit a few days later, to which Nirvana's lawyers said they "will resist with vigor".

== Release and sales ==
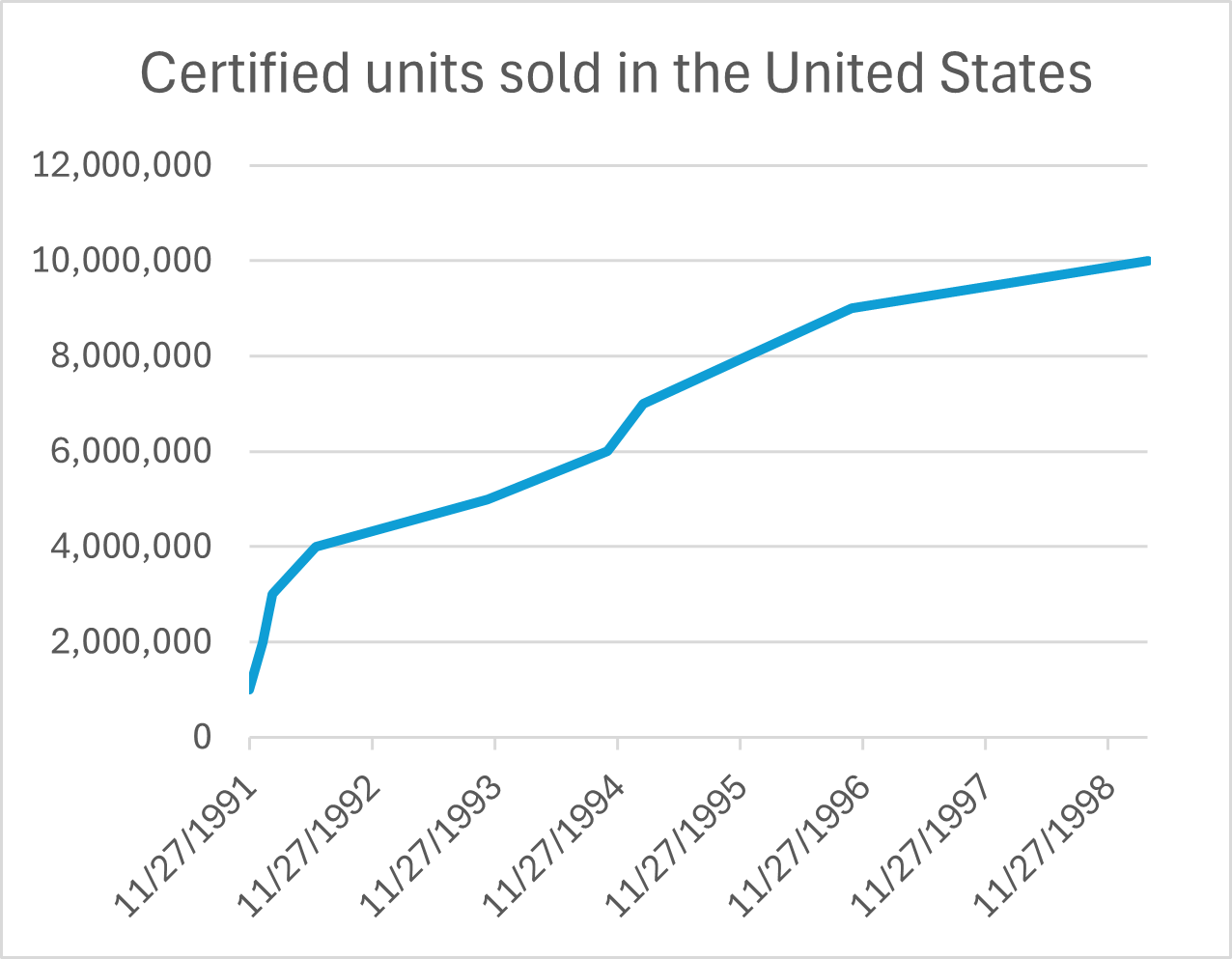
Certified sales of Nevermind in the United States in the 1990s, according to the RIAA database. The album went both Gold and Platinum on November 27, 1991, and was certified Diamond on March 24, 1999.

Nevermind was released on September 24, 1991. American record stores received an initial shipment of 46,251 copies, while 35,000 copies were shipped in the United Kingdom, where Bleach had been successful. The lead single "Smells Like Teen Spirit" had been released on September 10 with the intention of building a base among alternative rock fans, while the next single "Come as You Are" would possibly garner more attention. Days before the release date, the band began a short American tour in support of the album. Geffen hoped that Nevermind would sell around 250,000 copies, matching sales of Sonic Youth's Geffen debut Goo. The most optimistic estimate was that Nevermind could be certified gold (500,000 copies sold) by September 1992.

Nevermind debuted at number 144 on the Billboard 200. Geffen shipped about half of the initial U.S. pressing to the American Northwest, where it sold out quickly and was unavailable for days. Geffen put production of all other albums on hold to fulfill demand in the region. Over the next few months, sales increased significantly as "Smells Like Teen Spirit" unexpectedly increased in popularity. The song's video had received a world premiere on MTV's late-night alternative show 120 Minutes, and soon became popular enough for the network to start broadcasting it during the daytime. "Smells Like Teen Spirit" reached number 6 on the US Billboard Hot 100. The album was soon certified gold, but the band was relatively uninterested. Novoselic recalled, "Yeah I was happy about it. It was pretty cool. It was kind of neat. But I don't give a shit about some kind of achievement like that. It's cool—I guess."

As the band set out for their European tour at the start of November 1991, Nevermind entered the Billboard Top 40 for the first time at number 35. By this point, "Smells Like Teen Spirit" had become a hit and the album was selling so fast none of Geffen's marketing strategies could be enacted. Geffen president Ed Rosenblatt told The New York Times, "We didn't do anything. It was just one of those 'Get out of the way and duck' records." Nirvana found as they toured Europe during the end of 1991 that the shows were dangerously oversold, television crews became a constant presence onstage, and "Smells Like Teen Spirit" was almost omnipresent on radio and music television.

Nevermind became Nirvana's first number-one album on January 11, 1992, replacing Michael Jackson's Dangerous at the top of the Billboard charts. By this time, Nevermind was selling approximately 300,000 copies a week. It returned for a second week at number one in February. "Come as You Are" was released as the second single in March 1992; it reached number 9 on the UK Singles Chart and number 32 on the Billboard Hot 100 singles chart. Two more singles, "Lithium" and "In Bloom", reached number 11 and 28 on the UK Singles Chart.

Nevermind was certified gold and platinum by the Recording Industry Association of America (RIAA) in November 1991 and certified Diamond in March 1999. It was also certified Diamond in Canada (1,000,000 units sold) by the Canadian Recording Industry Association in March 2001 and 9× platinum in the United Kingdom. It has gone on to sell more than 30 million copies worldwide, making it one of the best-selling albums of all time.

== Critical reception ==
Contemporary professional ratings
Review scores
Source	Rating
Chicago Sun-Times	4/4 stars
Chicago Tribune	4/4 stars
Entertainment Weekly	A−
Kerrang!	5/5
Los Angeles Times	3.5/4 stars
NME	9/10
Q	4/5 stars
Rolling Stone	3/5 stars
Select	4/5
The Village Voice	A−

Geffen's press promotion for Nevermind was lower than that typical of a major record label. The label's publicist primarily targeted music publications with long lead times for publication as well as magazines in the Seattle area. The unexpectedly positive feedback from critics who had received the album convinced the label to consider increasing the album's original print run.

At first, Nevermind did not receive many reviews, and many publications ignored the album. Months after its release and after "Smells Like Teen Spirit" garnered airplay, print media organizations were "scrambling" to cover the phenomenon the album had become. However, by that point, much of the attention fell on Cobain rather than the album itself. The reviews that did initially appear were largely positive. Karen Schoemer of The New York Times wrote, "With Nevermind, Nirvana has certainly succeeded. There are enough intriguing textures, mood shifts, instrumental snippets and inventive word plays to provide for hours of entertainment ... Nevermind is more sophisticated and carefully produced than anything peer bands like Dinosaur Jr. and Mudhoney have yet offered."

Entertainment Weekly gave Nevermind an A− rating. The reviewer, David Browne, wrote that Nirvana "never entertain the notion" of wanting to sound "normal", compared to other contemporary alternative bands. Concluding his enthusiastic review for the British Melody Maker, Everett True wrote that "When Nirvana released Bleach all those years ago, the more sussed among us figured they had the potential to make an album that would blow every other contender away. My God have they proved us right." Spin gave Nevermind a favorable review stating that "you'll be humming all the songs for the rest of your life—or at least until your CD-tape-album wears out." Select compared the band to Jane's Addiction, Sonic Youth, and the Pixies, stating that the album "proves that Nirvana truly belong in such high company."

Some reviews were not entirely positive. Rolling Stone gave the album three out of five stars. Reviewer Ira Robbins wrote, "If Nirvana isn't onto anything altogether new, Nevermind does possess the songs, character and confident spirit to be much more than a reformulation of college radio's high-octane hits." The Boston Globe was less enthusiastic about the album; reviewer Steve Morse wrote, "Most of Nevermind is packed with generic punk-pop that had been done by countless acts from Iggy Pop to the Red Hot Chili Peppers," and added "the band has little or nothing to say, settling for moronic ramblings by singer-lyricist Cobain."

Nevermind was voted the best album of the year in The Village Voice Pazz & Jop critics' poll; "Smells Like Teen Spirit" also topped the single of the year and video of the year polls. Nevermind topped the poll by a large majority, and Village Voice critic Robert Christgau wrote in his companion piece to the poll, "As a modest pop surprise they might have scored a modest victory, like De La Soul in 1990. Instead, their multi-platinum takeover constituted the first full-scale public validation of the Amerindie values—the noise, the toons, the 'tude—the radder half of the [Pazz & Jop poll] electorate came up on." In the United Kingdom, the album was ranked number one on NME's Best Fifty LPs of 1991. The album garnered the band three Grammy Award nominations in total at the 34th and 35th Grammy Awards. Among the nominations was the Best Alternative Music Album award.

== Legacy ==
=== Cultural impact ===
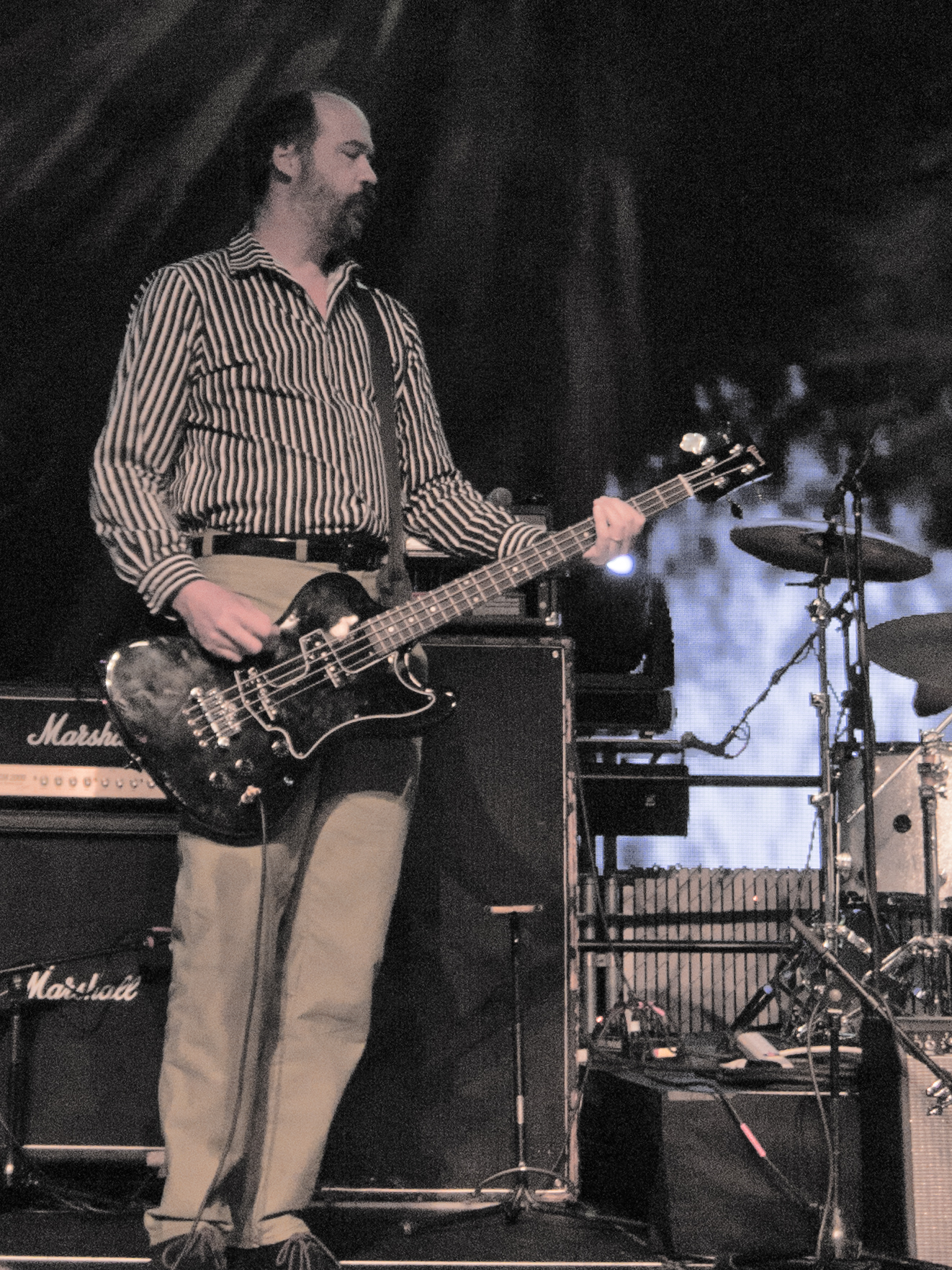
Bassist Krist Novoselic at a Nevermind 20th anniversary show in 2011

Nevermind popularized the Seattle grunge movement and brought alternative rock as a whole into the mainstream, establishing its commercial and cultural viability and leading to an alternative rock boom in the music industry. Though a short tenure from the album's release to the death of Cobain, the album's and singles' successes propelled Nirvana to being regarded by the media as the biggest band in the world—especially throughout 1992. As a grunge act, the band's success over the popular hair metal acts of the time drew similarities to the early 1960s British Invasion of American popular music. The album also initiated a resurgence of interest in punk culture among teenagers and young adults of Generation X. Journalist Chuck Eddy cited Nevermind's release as roughly the end of the "high album era".

Billboard writer William Goodman lauds the album, particularly in comparison to the music and image of hair metal acts: "Instead of the chest-beating, coke-blowing, women-objectifying macho rock star of the '80s, Cobain popularized (or re-invigorated) the image of the sensitive artist, the pro-feminism, anti-authoritarian smart alec punk with a sweet smile and gentle soul." In its citation placing it at number 17 in its 2003 list of the 500 greatest albums of all time, Rolling Stone said, "No album in recent history had such an overpowering impact on a generation—a nation of teens suddenly turned punk—and such a catastrophic effect on its main creator." Gary Gersh, who signed Nirvana to Geffen Records, added that "There is a pre-Nirvana and post-Nirvana record business...'Nevermind' showed that this wasn't some alternative thing happening off in a corner, and then back to reality. This is reality."

The album had an enormous impact towards youth culture. Goodman says that Nevermind "killed off hair metal, and sparked a cultural revolution across the globe". Speaking to the BBC, Brazilian cultural studies academic Moyses Pinto stated that he was struck by Nevermind, saying "I thought: 'this is perfect'; it sounded like a bright synthesis of noise and pop music." In similar praise, Kgomotso Neto says that the impact of Nirvana, as well as MTV, during the time of Nevermind, caused a new youth who listened to the same music and dressed similarly (grunge fashion). Neto further remarks that "there was a cultural homogeneity probably never experienced before" and that "grunge culture became dominant very quickly; all that had been 'cool' suddenly became ugly and exaggerated, and Kurt [Cobain] was the symbol of transgression." Michael Azerrad argued in his Nirvana biography Come as You Are: The Story of Nirvana (1993) that Nevermind marked an epochal generational shift in music similar to the rock-and-roll explosion in the 1950s and the end of the dominance of the Baby Boomer Generation on popular music. Azerrad wrote, "Nevermind came along at exactly the right time. This was music by, for, and about a whole new group of young people who had been overlooked, ignored, or condescended to." Jessica Letkemann of Pitchfork said: "Call it a generational changing of the guard if you must, but these 12 songs connected with young listeners around the world—some who just thought they rocked, and many more who recognized Cobain's wary POV for what it was: the truth."

The success of Nevermind surprised Nirvana's contemporaries, who felt dwarfed by its influence. Fugazi frontman Guy Picciotto later said: "It was like our record could have been a hobo pissing in the forest for the amount of impact it had ... It felt like we were playing ukuleles all of a sudden because of the disparity of the impact of what they did." Karen Schoemer of the New York Times wrote that "What's unusual about Nirvana's Nevermind is that it caters to neither a mainstream audience nor the indie rock fans who supported the group's debut album." In 1992, Jon Pareles of The New York Times described the aftermath of the album's breakthrough: "Suddenly, all bets are off. No one has the inside track on which of dozens, perhaps hundreds, of ornery, obstreperous, unkempt bands might next appeal to the mall-walking millions." Record company executives offered large advances and record deals to bands, and replaced their previous strategies of building audiences for alternative bands with the attempts to achieve mainstream popularity quickly.

=== Reappraisal ===
Retrospective professional ratings
Review scores
Source	Rating
AllMusic	5/5 stars
The A.V. Club	A
Blender	5/5 stars
Christgau's Consumer Guide	A
The Daily Telegraph	5/5 stars
Pitchfork	10/10
Q	5/5 stars
Rolling Stone	5/5 stars
The Rolling Stone Album Guide	5/5 stars
Spin	5/5 stars

Nevermind has continued to garner critical praise, having been ranked highly on lists of the greatest albums of all time. The album was ranked number 17 on Rolling Stone's list of The 500 Greatest Albums of All Time, maintaining the rating in a 2012 revised list, and upgrading to number 6 in the 2020 and 2023 revisions. In 2019, Rolling Stone also ranked Nevermind number one on its list of the 100 Best Albums of the '90s, calling it the "album that guaranteed the nineties would not suck." Also in 2019, Nevermind was ranked number one on Rolling Stone's 50 Greatest Grunge Albums list. The magazine ranked the album number 10 in its list of 40 Greatest Punk Albums of All Time too.

In 2001, VH1 conducted a poll of more than 500 journalists, music executives and artists which judged Nevermind the second-best album in rock 'n' roll history, behind the Beatles' Revolver. Time placed Nevermind, which writer Josh Tyrangiel called "the finest album of the 90s", on its 2006 list of "The All-TIME 100 Albums". Pitchfork named the album the sixth best of the decade, noting that "anyone who hates this record today is just trying to be cool, and needs to be trying harder." In 2004, the Library of Congress added Nevermind to the National Recording Registry, which collects "culturally, historically or aesthetically important" sound recordings from the 20th century. On the other hand, Nevermind was voted the "Most Overrated Album in the World" in a 2005 BBC public poll. Rock Hard ranked the album at number 88 on their list of the "500 Greatest Rock & Metal Albums of All Time". In 2006, readers of Guitar World ranked Nevermind 8th on a list of the 100 Greatest Guitar Recordings. Entertainment Weekly named it the 10th best album of all time on their 2013 list. It was voted number 17 in the third edition of Colin Larkin's All Time Top 1000 Albums (2000). Christgau named it among his 10 best albums from the 1990s and said in retrospect it is an A-plus album. In 2017, "Smells Like Teen Spirit" was inducted into the Grammy Hall of Fame. In October 2023, the Official Charts Company revealed that Nevermind was the fourth most streamed album from the 1990s in the United Kingdom. In 2024, Paste ranked Nevermind number 65 on its list of the greatest albums of all-time. Also in 2024, Loudwire staff elected it as the best hard rock album of 1991.

=== Reissues ===
In 1996, Mobile Fidelity Sound Labs released Nevermind on vinyl as part of its ANADISQ 200 series, and as a 24-karat gold CD. The CD pressings included "Endless, Nameless". The LP version quickly sold out its limited pressing but the CD edition stayed in print for years. In 2009, Original Recordings Group released Nevermind on limited edition 180g blue vinyl and regular 180g black vinyl mastered and cut by Bernie Grundman from the original analog tapes.

In September 2011, the album's 20th anniversary, Universal Music Enterprises reissued Nevermind in a two-CD "deluxe edition" and a four-CD/one-DVD "Super Deluxe Edition". The first disc on both editions features the original album with studio and live B-sides. The second discs feature early session recordings, including the Smart Studio sessions and some band rehearsals recorded with a boombox, plus two BBC session recordings. The "Super Deluxe Edition" also includes Vig's original mix of the album and CD and DVD versions of Live at the Paramount. IFPI reported that as of 2012, the 20th anniversary formats of the album that were released in 2011 had sold nearly 800,000 units. In June 2021, Novoselic revealed that he and Grohl were compiling the 30th-anniversary edition of the album. In September 2021, it was announced that BBC Two in the United Kingdom would celebrate the 30th anniversary with a documentary titled When Nirvana Came to Britain, which featured contributions from Novoselic and Grohl. That same month, a 30th-anniversary edition of Nevermind was announced, which became available in eight-LP and five-CD editions and contained 70 previously unreleased live songs. The CD edition also included a Blu-ray of Live in Amsterdam.

== Track listing ==
All tracks are written by Kurt Cobain, except where noted. (Note: On the original release of the album, all music was credited to Nirvana.)

No.	Title	Writer(s)	Length
1.	"Smells Like Teen Spirit"	Cobain; Dave Grohl; Krist Novoselic	5:01
2.	"In Bloom"		4:14
3.	"Come as You Are"		3:39
4.	"Breed"		3:03
5.	"Lithium"		4:17
6.	"Polly"		2:57
7.	"Territorial Pissings"	Cobain; Chet Powers	2:22
8.	"Drain You"		3:43
9.	"Lounge Act"		2:36
10.	"Stay Away"		3:32
11.	"On a Plain"		3:16
12.	"Something in the Way"		3:52
13.	"Endless, Nameless" (hidden track (Note: To Cobain's indignation, hidden track "Endless, Nameless" was absent on the initial pressing of the CD; he then demanded it be included as originally intended. It appears on later pressings after about 10 minutes of silence following "Something in the Way", making track 12's total length 20:35. Still, the song is not included on vinyl or cassette versions.))		6:43
Total length:			49:07

== Personnel ==
Personnel adapted from Nevermind liner notes.

Nirvana

- Kurt Cobain – guitars, vocals, sound effects on "Drain You"
- Krist Novoselic (credited as Chris Novoselic) – bass, vocals on "Territorial Pissings" (intro)
- Dave Grohl (credited as David Grohl) – drums, backing vocals on "In Bloom", "Drain You", and "On a Plain"

Additional musicians

- Chad Channing – cymbals on "Polly" (uncredited), drums on the "Smart Studio Sessions" (Deluxe Edition)
- Kirk Canning – cello on "Something in the Way"

Technical staff and artwork

- Butch Vig – producer, engineer
- Nirvana – producer, engineer
- Andy Wallace – mixing
- Jeff Sheehan – assistant engineer
- Craig Doubet – assistant mixing engineer
- Howie Weinberg – mastering
- Robert Fisher – artwork, art direction, design, cover design
- Michael Lavine – photography
- Kurt Cobain (credited for the "Monkey Photo" as Kurdt Kobain) – cover concept, "Monkey Photo"
- Kirk Weddle – cover photo
- Spencer Elden – infant in cover photo
- Robin Sloane – DGC/Geffen Records Creative Director
- Paul Carlsen – engineering/digital editing
- Bob Ludwig – mastering on 20th Anniversary Edition

== Charts ==
=== Weekly charts ===
Weekly chart performance for the original release
Chart (1991–1992)	Peak position
Australian Albums (ARIA)	2
Australian Alternative Albums (ARIA)	1
Austrian Albums (Ö3 Austria)	2
Belgian Albums (IFPI Belgium)	1
Brazilian Albums (Bizz)	1
Buenos Aires Albums (UPI)	1
Canada Top Albums/CDs (RPM)	1
Canada Albums (The Record)	1
Danish Albums (Hitlisten)	3
Dutch Albums (Album Top 100)	3
European Top 100 Albums (Music & Media)	2
Finnish Albums (The Official Finnish Charts)	1
French Albums (SNEP)	1
German Albums (Offizielle Top 100)	3
Greek Albums (IFPI Greece)	1
Hungarian Albums (MAHASZ)	12
Irish Albums (IFPI Ireland)	1
Israeli Albums (IBA)	1
Italian Albums (Musica e dischi)	10
Japanese Albums (Oricon)	24
New Zealand Albums (RMNZ)	2
Norwegian Albums (VG-lista)	2
Portuguese Albums (AFP)	1
South African Albums (SABC)	5
Spanish Albums (PROMUSICAE)	2
Swedish Albums (Sverigetopplistan)	1
Swiss Albums (Schweizer Hitparade)	2
UK Network Albums (MRIB)	6
UK Albums (Official Charts)	7
US Billboard 200	1
US Top 200 Pop Albums (Cashbox)	1
Zimbabwean Albums	4

Chart (1998)	Peak position
UK Rock & Metal Albums (Official Charts)	1

Chart (2005)	Peak position
UK R&B Albums (Official Charts)	11

Chart (2015)	Peak position
Polish Albums (ZPAV)	11

Chart (2017)	Peak position
Canadian Albums (Billboard)	46

Chart (2019)	Peak position
Belgian Albums (Ultratop Flanders)	12
US Top Rock Albums (Billboard)	16

Chart (2021)	Peak position
Irish Albums (Official Charts)	15
Polish Albums (ZPAV)	1
US Top Rock Albums (Billboard)	9

Chart (2022)	Peak position
Greek Albums (Billboard)	1

Chart (2025)	Peak position
Norwegian Rock Albums (IFPI Norge)	12

Chart (2026)	Peak position
Croatian International Albums (HDU)	7

Weekly chart performance for the 20th Anniversary Edition of Nevermind
Chart (2011)	Peak position
Belgian Albums (Ultratop Wallonia)	7
Danish Albums (Hitlisten)	16
Finnish Albums (Suomen virallinen lista)	41
French Albums (SNEP)	5
Greek Albums (Billboard)	5
Italian Albums (FIMI)	20
Japanese Albums (Oricon)	26
Portuguese Albums (AFP)	1
Scottish Albums (Official Charts)	4
UK Albums (Official Charts Company)	5
US Billboard 200 Super Deluxe Edition	131
US Top Catalog Albums (Billboard)	2
US Top Rock Albums (Billboard) Super Deluxe Edition	34

=== Year-end charts ===
Year-end chart performance for Nevermind
Chart (1991)	Position
Canadian Albums (RPM)	87
UK Albums (OCC)	89

Chart (1992)	Position
Argentina Foreign Albums (CAPIF)	13
Australian Albums (ARIA)	17
Australian Alternative Albums (ARIA)	8
Austrian Albums (Ö3 Austria)	11
Canada Top Albums (RPM)	8
Dutch Albums (Album Top 100)	9
Eurochart Top 100 Albums (Music & Media)	5
French Albums (SNEP)	4
German Albums (Offiziele Top 100)	7
Italian Albums (Musica e dischi)	41
New Zealand Albums (RMNZ)	8
Swedish Albums (Sverigetopplistan)	7
Swiss Albums (Schweizer Hitparade)	10
UK Albums (OCC)	22
US Billboard 200	3

Chart (1993)	Position
UK Albums (OCC)	71

Chart (1994)	Position
Australian Albums (ARIA)	66
Dutch Albums (Album Top 100)	55
Swedish Albums (IFPI Sverige)	71
UK Albums (OCC)	80
US Billboard 200	84

Chart (1995)	Position
Australian Albums (ARIA)	35
Belgian Albums (Ultratop Wallonia)	57
Canada Top Albums/CDs (RPM)	6
UK Albums (OCC)	88
US Billboard 200	115

Chart (1996)	Position
Australian Albums (ARIA)	49

Chart (1998)	Position
UK Albums (OCC)	117

Chart (1999)	Position
UK Albums (OCC)	135

Chart (2001)	Position
UK Albums (OCC)	168

Chart (2002)	Position
Canadian Alternative Albums (Nielsen SoundScan)	102
Canadian Metal Albums (Nielsen SoundScan)	47
UK Albums (OCC)	194

Chart (2005)	Position
Belgian Midprice Albums (Ultratop Flanders)	38
Belgian Midprice Albums (Ultratop Wallonia)	22
UK Albums (OCC)	160

Chart (2006)	Position
Belgian Midprice Albums (Ultratop Flanders)	16
Belgian Midprice Albums (Ultratop Wallonia)	16

Chart (2009)	Position
Belgian Midprice Albums (Ultratop Wallonia)	50

Chart (2011)	Position
Belgian Midprice Albums (Ultratop Flanders)	22
Belgian Midprice Albums (Ultratop Wallonia)	32
Italian Albums (FIMI)	97
Polish Albums (ZPAV)	97
UK Vinyl Albums (OCC)	12
UK Albums (OCC)	127

Chart (2012)	Position
Belgian Midprice Albums (Ultratop Flanders)	31
Belgian Midprice Albums (Ultratop Wallonia)	33

Chart (2013)	Position
Argentine Albums (CAPIF)	66

Chart (2015)	Position
Australian Albums (ARIA)	98
Italian Albums (FIMI)	98
UK Vinyl Albums (OCC)	13

Chart (2016)	Position
Italian Albums (FIMI)	89
Polish Albums (ZPAV)	96
UK Vinyl Albums (OCC)	10
US Billboard 200	161

Chart (2017)	Position
Austrian Albums (Ö3 Austria)	69
Italian Albums (FIMI)	85
UK Vinyl Albums (OCC)	15
US Billboard 200	183
US Top Rock Albums (Billboard)	30

Chart (2018)	Position
Australian Vinyl Albums (ARIA)	3
Austrian Albums (Ö3 Austria)	72
Italian Albums (FIMI)	78
Portuguese Albums (AFP)	138
UK Vinyl Albums (OCC)	7
US Top Rock Albums (Billboard)	55

Chart (2019)	Position
Australian Vinyl Albums (ARIA)	17
Belgian Albums (Ultratop Flanders)	76
Belgian Albums (Ultratop Wallonia)	106
Italian Albums (FIMI)	94
Portuguese Albums (AFP)	63
UK Vinyl Albums (OCC)	14
US Billboard 200	160
US Top Rock Albums (Billboard)	27

Chart (2020)	Position
Australian Vinyl Albums (ARIA)	10
Austrian Albums (Ö3 Austria)	50
Belgian Albums (Ultratop Flanders)	72
Belgian Albums (Ultratop Wallonia)	91
Croatian International Albums (HDU)	33
Italian Albums (FIMI)	94
UK Vinyl Albums (OCC)	4
US Billboard 200	129
US Top Rock Albums (Billboard)	13

Chart (2021)	Position
Australian Vinyl Albums (ARIA)	2
Austrian Albums (Ö3 Austria)	22
Belgian Albums (Ultratop Flanders)	46
Belgian Albums (Ultratop Wallonia)	68
German Albums (Offizielle Top 100)	68
Irish Vinyl Albums (IRMA)	17
Italian Albums (FIMI)	61
New Zealand Albums (RMNZ)	47
Polish Albums (ZPAV)	34
Portuguese Albums (AFP)	13
UK Albums (OCC)	72
US Billboard 200	97
US Catalog Albums (Billboard)	21
US Top Rock Albums (Billboard)	14
Worldwide Vinyl Albums (IFPI)	8

Chart (2022)	Position
Australian Albums (ARIA)	44
Austrian Albums (Ö3 Austria)	26
Belgian Albums (Ultratop Flanders)	52
Belgian Albums (Ultratop Wallonia)	76
Dutch Albums (Album Top 100)	42
German Albums (Offizielle Top 100)	39
Hungarian Albums (MAHASZ)	88
Icelandic Albums (Tónlistinn)	36
Italian Vinyl Albums (FIMI)	19
Lithuanian Albums (AGATA)	38
New Zealand Albums (RMNZ)	47
Polish Albums (ZPAV)	25
Portuguese Albums (AFP)	11
Swiss Albums (Schweizer Hitparade)	88
UK Albums (OCC)	58
US Billboard 200	57
US Top Rock Albums (Billboard)	6

Chart (2023)	Position
Australian Albums (ARIA)	70
Belgian Albums (Ultratop Flanders)	76
Belgian Albums (Ultratop Wallonia)	110
Dutch Albums (Album Top 100)	70
Hungarian Albums (MAHASZ)	99
Icelandic Albums (Tónlistinn)	79
Swiss Albums (Schweizer Hitparade)	28
UK Vinyl Albums (OCC)	39
US Billboard 200	126
US Top Rock Albums (Billboard)	15

Chart (2024)	Position
Australian Albums (ARIA)	77
Austrian Albums (Ö3 Austria)	42
Belgian Albums (Ultratop Flanders)	68
Belgian Albums (Ultratop Wallonia)	95
Croatian International Albums (HDU)	34
Dutch Albums (Album Top 100)	58
German Albums (Offizielle Top 100)	46
Icelandic Albums (Tónlistinn)	91
US Billboard 200	93

Chart (2025)	Position
Australian Albums (ARIA)	90
Belgian Albums (Ultratop Flanders)	63
Belgian Albums (Ultratop Wallonia)	101
Dutch Albums (Album Top 100)	45
German Albums (Offizielle Top 100)	41
Icelandic Albums (Tónlistinn)	58
Polish Albums (ZPAV)	87
US Billboard 200	76

=== Decade-end charts ===
1990s decade-end chart performance for Nevermind
Chart (1990–1999)	Position
US Billboard 200	32

2010s decade-end chart performance for Nevermind
Chart (2010–2019)	Position
UK Vinyl Albums (OCC)	9

== Certifications and sales ==
Certifications for Nevermind
Region	Certification	Certified units/sales
Argentina (CAPIF)	3× Platinum	180,000^{^}
Australia (ARIA)	5× Platinum	350,000^{^}
Austria (IFPI Austria)	Platinum	50,000^{*}
Belgium (BRMA)	8× Platinum	400,000^{‡}
Brazil (Pro-Música Brasil)	Platinum	250,000^{*}
Canada (Music Canada)	Diamond	1,000,000^{^}
Denmark (IFPI Danmark)	7× Platinum	140,000^{‡}
Finland (Musiikkituottajat)	Gold	46,830
France (SNEP)	Diamond	1,000,000^{*}
Germany (BVMI)	2× Platinum	1,000,000^{^}
Iceland (FHF)	Platinum	5,000
Italy (FIMI) sales since 2009	4× Platinum	200,000^{‡}
Japan (RIAJ)	3× Platinum	600,000^{^}
Mexico (AMPROFON)	2× Gold	200,000^{^}
Netherlands (NVPI)	Platinum	100,000^{^}
New Zealand (RMNZ)	7× Platinum	105,000^{^}
Poland (ZPAV) BMG release	Platinum	100,000^{*}
Poland (ZPAV) Geffen/Universal Music release	3× Platinum	60,000^{‡}
Portugal (AFP)	Platinum	40,000^{^}
Singapore	—	35,000
Spain (Promusicae)	Platinum	100,000^{^}
Sweden (GLF)	2× Platinum	200,000^{^}
Switzerland (IFPI Switzerland)	Platinum	50,000^{^}
United Kingdom (BPI)	10× Platinum	3,000,000^{‡}
United States (RIAA)	13× Platinum	13,000,000^{‡}
Summaries
Worldwide	—	30,000,000
^{*} Sales figures based on certification alone.^{^} Shipments figures based on certification alone.^{‡} Sales+streaming figures based on certification alone.

== See also ==
- 1991 in music
- Album era
- Classic Albums: Nirvana – Nevermind
- Nevermind It's an Interview
- List of best-selling albums
- List of best-selling albums in Belgium
- List of best-selling albums in France
- List of best-selling albums in the United Kingdom
- List of best-selling albums in the United States
- List of 1990s albums considered the best
- List of Billboard 200 number-one albums of 1992
- List of diamond-certified albums in Canada
- List of 200 Definitive Albums in the Rock and Roll Hall of Fame
