= List of Hazel episodes =

American Television Series (1961-1966)

This is a list of episodes of the television series Hazel.

== Series overview ==
At present, all five seasons have been released on DVD.

| Season | Episodes | Originally released | | | Rank |
| Season | Episodes | First released | Last released | Network | Rank |
|---|---|---|---|---|---|
| 1 | 35 | September 28, 1961 | June 7, 1962 | NBC | #4 |
| 2 | 32 | September 20, 1962 | May 9, 1963 | NBC | #15 |
| 3 | 32 | September 19, 1963 | April 23, 1964 | NBC | #22 |
| 4 | 26 | September 17, 1964 | March 25, 1965 | NBC | Not in top 30 |
| 5 | 29 | September 13, 1965 | April 11, 1966 | CBS | Not in top 30 |

== Episodes ==
=== Season 1 (1961–62) ===
This is the only season in black-and-white, with the exception of episode 6 which was filmed in color.

| No. overall | No. in season | Title | Directed by | Written by | Original release date |
|---|---|---|---|---|---|
| 1 | 1 | "Hazel and the Playground" | William D. Russell | William Cowley & Peggy Chantler Dick | September 28, 1961 |
Hazel (Shirley Booth) is teaching little Harold (Bobby Buntrock) how to place kick a football. Hazel kicks the football and it goes into Herbert (Donald Foster) and Harriet Johnson's (Norma Varden) chimney. The Johnson's have a fire going and smoke starts coming in the house. Hazel gets a ladder and gets the football. George Baxter (Don DeFore) is meeting with potential client Mr. Pruett (Maurice Manson). Hazel wants half of the state's botanical garden changed to a playground for the town's children. Hazel speaks with Park Commissioner Osborn Bailey (Francis DeSales). He tells her she needs to get 5000 signatures to put it on a ballot. Bailey tells his secretary that Mr. Pruett's grandfather donated the land that the garden is on. George bets Hazel that she won't get enough signatures. Hazel is participating in a bowling tournament. She wins and because the event it televised, she is able to make her plea for the playground. Pruett is upset when he hears that George was the first to sign the petition. But his wife Emily (Lurene Tuttle) makes him sign the petition as well. Hazel gets enough signatures and the Pruett playground is built. Hal Smith, Otis of The Andy Griffith Show, as the bowling tournament announcer. George DeNormand as Tommy Bronson. Barry Van Dyke as Boy at Playground.
| 2 | 2 | "Hazel Makes a Will" | William D. Russell | William Cowley & Peggy Chantler Dick | October 5, 1961 |
Hazel loans her roller skates to her friend Mert (Queenie Leonard). George lands a new lucrative account, so Hazel tells Mert that it's time to ask for a raise. Hazel hints at the raise to George. She also mentions the loose brick in the front walk. George tells Dorothy (Whitney Blake) that Hazel is not getting a raise this year. He goes to tell her. Hazel shows George a replica Eiffel Tower with a clock in it that she got at the school rummage sale. George tells her no raise. The next day, Hazel trips on the loose brick and sprains her ankle. Barney the mailman (Robert B. Williams) helps her to the house. Hazel's maid friend Rosie (Maudie Prickett) comes to visit her because she's bedridden. When Rosie tells George and Dorothy that Hazel wants to see her nephew Leroy (Wright King) the lawyer, George thinks she's going to sue him. Hazel wants to make out her will. One of the things Hazel puts in her will is that she wants George to have her Eiffel Tower. When George finds out what Hazel is really doing, he feels ashamed and gives in on the raise.
| 3 | 3 | "Hazel Plays Nurse" | William D. Russell | William Cowley & Peggy Chantler Dick | October 12, 1961 |
Hazel reminds Dorothy that there's a special assembly at school this afternoon. Dorothy says she didn't forget because Harold is going to lead the Pledge of Allegiance. George gets a call from his important client, Harvey Griffin (Howard Smith). Harvey wants to see George as soon as possible. Dorothy can tell that George is out of sorts, but he blames it on Griffin. Hazel learns that George has a temperature. Despite having to meet with Griffin about an important merger, Hazel puts George to bed. Hazel tells Dorothy that George has a bad cold. Griffin gets to George's office and finds out he's not there. He has Miss Scott (Molly Dodd), George's secretary, call the house. Dr. Summerfield (Henry Hunter) checks on George and confirms Hazel's diagnosis. Hazel has Gordy the phone man (Hal Baylor) put an extension in George's room. Griffin stops by the house, and when he turns out to have a cold as well, Hazel also puts him to bed. Griffin winds up appreciating what Hazel is doing and says she reminds him of his mother. Norman Leavitt as Joe the school bus driver.
| 4 | 4 | "A Matter of Principle" | William D. Russell | Louella MacFarlane | October 19, 1961 |
George invites Mr. Sutherland (Vinton Hayworth), an important new client, to dinner at the house. Hazel takes the car to go marketing and George realizes that the papers he needs for Sutherland are in the car. Hazel finds the papers and brings them to George, who is with Sutherland at the golf course. She tries to show Sutherland how to grip the golf club. Sutherland actually likes Hazel's suggestion. George promises Sutherland a chocolate soufflé after dinner. Hazel receives a parking ticket and decides to fight it in court. That night, Hazel is upset about the ticket and didn't make the soufflé. When she learns that George will represent her in court, she whips up a soufflé. George thinks he'll be able to get Sutherland as a witness. In the courtroom, the Prosecutor (Laurence Haddon) calls Officer Dietrich (John Lasell), who wrote the ticket. After hearing some construction workers outside, George asks Judge Rosencrantz (Lewis Martin) if the case could be moved to the location of the parking meter which is nearby. George is able to prove that the vibrations of the jackhammers caused the meter to falter. Hazel wins the case and George impresses Mr. Sutherland. Victor French as Bailiff.
| 5 | 5 | "Dorothy's New Client" | William D. Russell | William Cowley & Peggy Chantler Dick | October 26, 1961 |
Francesca Edwards (Joan Banks), another decorator, tries to get Dorothy to work for her. Dorothy, however, is not interested. Barney the Mailman drops off a letter for Dorothy. It's a reminder that she owes money for a chair she bought for George. Dorothy's interior decorating business is not doing too well. Hazel thinks she's found a client for her. A new neighbor, Flora Duncan (Mary Jackson), just moved in. Dorothy will go to see her, but won't mention decorating. Meanwhile, Hazel tells Flora's maid Della (Alice Backes) about the Sunshine Girls. They are a group of local maids that help each other. Hazel also gets Della to promote Dorothy's decorating skills to Flora. Dorothy is not happy about what Hazel did, as she doesn't like to promote her business that way. Hazel has the Sunshine Girls help arrange Flora's house. Rosie and Mert drop hints about getting a decorator. Francesca acts unscrupulously and tries to manipulate Flora into hiring her services. Mrs. Duncan didn't care for the way Francesca acted and asks Dorothy to decorate her home. Later, Hazel finds a way to try out George's new chair.
| 6 | 6 | "What'll We Watch Tonight?" | William D. Russell | William Cowley & Peggy Chantler Dick | November 2, 1961 |
During dinner, George mentions that he and Hazel will be watching a boxing match on TV. It's a couple local boys and George is very confident with his man. He's going to raise the usual bet. Hazel's boxer knocks out George's boxer in the first round. They then can't agree on what to watch next. Hazel complains about the problems with the little TV in her room. George decides her set isn't worth repairing and will buy Hazel a new TV. Before they leave for the TV store, Dorothy tells George that Hazel is wearing a jacket with a mink collar. It smells of mothballs and George should pretend to not notice. At the store, they speak with Mr. Thornton (Walter Kinsella), the TV Salesman. Hazel kicks in the extra money to buy a color set. Hazel has all her friends come over to watch Perry Como in color, which annoys George to no end. George thought Jerry and Margaret Burns were coming over to play bridge. But it turns out they want to watch the show as well. Hazel even invited Mr. Thornton over. After a couple weeks George is upset that Dorothy and Harold spend so much time in Hazel's room. He decides it's time to get a color set as well. Note: This episode was filmed and shown in color.
| 7 | 7 | "A Dog for Harold" | William D. Russell | Jim Allen & R. S. Allen | November 9, 1961 |
Harold brings home a stray dog and names him Smiley. Dorothy would really like Harold to have a dog. The problem is that George doesn't want a dog, because they all seem to hate him. Hazel thinks she can talk George into it. George puts his foot down and says no dog. He wants Hazel to get rid of the dog as soon as possible. Hazel has her Policeman friend Chuck (Raymond Guth) take the dog for the time being. Hazel and Dorothy try to convince George to have a dog to guard against burglars, but it doesn't work. That night Hazel imitates burglary noises. Instead of a dog, George orders a burglar alarm system. Hazel admits it was her making the noises. Chuck brings Smiley back because the Police Chief didn't want him around. She hides Smiley in her room. That night, Smiley gets loose. Hazel sets off the alarm system trying to catch Smiley. The family thinks Harold may have run away, but they find him sleeping with Smiley in the basement. In the end, George realizes the dog is even friendly to him and the Baxters get to keep him. Note: During the closing credits of this show the Hazel theme song is performed with lyrics being sung.
| 8 | 8 | "George's Niece" | William D. Russell | William Cowley & Peggy Chantler Dick | November 16, 1961 |
Hazel gets a call from Tom Forbes (Larry J. Blake) asking her to join his bowling team, but she wants to stay with her team. She suggests her nephew, Eddy Burke (Johnny Washbrook). George's sister Deirdre Thompson (Cathy Lewis) calls and speaks to Dorothy. Deirdre says that she and her family will relocate nearby from Boston. Deirdre and her daughter Nancy (Davey Davison) will be coming first to look for a home. She wonders if Dorothy can put them up for a couple days. Deirdre treats 18 year old Nancy as a child. Deirdre tells Dorothy that her and Nancy don't really communicate. Hazel and Nancy become quick friends. Tom comes by to talk to Hazel about Eddy. Eddy arrives and is introduced to Tom and Nancy. Tom wants Eddy to meet the team for practice that night. Eddy takes Nancy to the bowling alley. Deirdre is outraged when Nancy starts dating Eddy. George and Dorothy tell Deirdre that Eddy is a nice boy, but Deirdre doesn't think he's good enough. Hazel speaks to Deirdre and finds a way for mother and daughter to mend their relationship.
| 9 | 9 | "Everybody's Thankful But Us Turkeys" | William D. Russell | William Cowley & Peggy Chantler Dick | November 23, 1961 |
Hazel is busy preparing a big Thanksgiving meal. She gets a call from her sister wishing her a Happy Thanksgiving. The Baxter's are expecting company. George's sister Phyllis Burkett (Beverly Tyler) calls asking if she can bring her husband Bob's (Charles Cooper) brother Tom (William Bakewell) along. She also tells Dorothy that her and Bob are having problems and she's thinking of leaving him. The Johnson's maid Phoebe tells Hazel that she's going to visit her brother. Hazel is worried because Harriet doesn't know how to cook. Hazel gives Harriet and Herbert a list of things to do for cooking the turkey. Phyllis, Bob and Tom arrive. Bob criticizes Phyllis' cooking in front of everyone. George’s mother (Harriet MacGibbon) then comes by. She offers to help, but George and Dorothy say she's a guest and should relax. Hazel finds a way to make Mother feel useful. Hazel then helps Phyllis resolve her issue with Bob. When Harriet under cooks her turkey, Hazel has the Johnson's come over to dinner. George insists that Hazel eat with them.
| 10 | 10 | "Winter Wonderland" | William D. Russell | Louella MacFarlane | December 7, 1961 |
Hazel shows Rosie her new winter outfit that she bought for the family's vacation at a ski lodge. Rosie thinks she bought it to impress Johnny Manson (Bill Zuckert), a man she goes dog sledding with. Just then Hazel gets a call from Johnny. Johnny says that because he wasn't sure she was coming to the lodge this year, he promised waitress Minna (Florence Sundstrom) could ride in the dog sled with him. It is agreed that Johnny will ride with the woman that weighs the least. Hazel suggests to the family that they go to the lodge a couple days early. George says he has to stay home for work. He says that Dorothy and Harold should go and he'll join them later. George expects Hazel to stay with him. Hazel finds an excuse to have Rosie stay with her and George. She hopes this will make George want to go to the lodge. Meanwhile at the lodge, Dorothy and Harold are spending time with Pat Bergstrom (Sally Mansfield), the ski instructor. Harold says that he sent a postcard to George and one to Hazel asking them to get there as soon as possible. With the help of a postcard from Harold, Hazel manages to play up to George's jealousy. Johnny asks Dorothy when Hazel will arrive. George calls Harold at the lodge. When Harold says that Dorothy is with Pat, he thinks Pat is a man. It's not long before George and Hazel are headed to the lodge. George finds out Pat is a woman and Johnny and Hazel win a dog sled trophy.
| 11 | 11 | "Hazel's Winning Personality" | William D. Russell | Teleplay By; William Cowley & Peggy Chantler Dick; Story By; Jim Allen & Ray Allen | December 14, 1961 |
Hazel's friend Laura is attracted to a gardener named Zeke (George Mitchell), but she can't bring herself to talk to him. Hazel and Laura attend a class entitled "You and Your Dynamic Personality". The instructor, Mr. Goodheart, says the way to remove a poisonous personality is to constantly use compliments. Hazel starts complimenting Dorothy and George. George mentions to Dorothy that his mooching cousin, Charles Perkins, is coming to visit. George asks Hazel why she's handing out all the phony compliments and she explains what she learned in the class. Dorothy tries compliments and gets a decorating job with a Mrs. Osborne (Louise Lorimer). Laura tries complimenting Zeke, but he is a man of few words. Harold gets into a fight with another boy when he tries complimenting him. Charles arrives and it costs George money. Hazel's compliments start to backfire and cause problems, including causing Dorothy to lose the job with Mrs. Osborne. Zeke brings Hazel flowers and wants to court her. He says that Laura talks too much. Hazel stops handing out phony compliments. Hazel gets Laura to be a woman of few words and Zeke now is interested in her.
| 12 | 12 | "Hazel's Christmas Shopping" | William D. Russell | William Cowley & Peggy Chantler Dick | December 21, 1961 |
Hazel hangs some mistletoe and George gives both her and Dorothy a kiss under it. Hazel is talking to Rosie about having a hard time picking out a present for Dorothy. She thinks she's found something special, but it's a little expensive. Dorothy is trying to think of what to get Hazel. Realizing he always gets Dorothy a purse as a present, George takes back the one he bought. But before he can exchange it, Larry (Byron Foulger), a shoplifter, walks off with it. Barney drops off the mail and hints at a Christmas tip to George. Hazel and Dorothy go to Masterson's Department Store hoping they find a gift for each other. Hazel takes a seasonal job at Masterson's to earn extra money for Dorothy's gift. Meanwhile, the shoplifter keeps making off with things from the store. Something that Mr. Brubaker (Dan Tobin), the store floorwalker, says gives Dorothy an idea for a gift for Hazel. Hazel's unusual concept of customer service almost causes her to be fired, until she helps catch the persistent shoplifter. As a reward, the store gives Hazel the gift she was working for. Eleanor Audley as a customer. Jonathan Hole as Personnel Manager.
| 13 | 13 | "Dorothy's Obsession" | William D. Russell | Robert Riley Crutcher | December 28, 1961 |
George makes Hazel promise not to say anything about his weight again. Instead, she leaves him notes. Dorothy is going to an estate sale to buy an antique desk for her friend Peggy Baldwin (Frances Helm). George is concerned as Dorothy always buys more than she should at those type of events. He asks Hazel to go with Dorothy to keep an eye on her. On the way home, Dorothy tells Hazel she bought a piano. It's being delivered C.O.D. She and Hazel then plot to convince George that he wants a piano before it is delivered. When they can't find a way to tell George, Dorothy calls Peggy and somehow convinces her to take the piano also. When Peggy's husband Phil (Lauren Gilbert) hears about it, he calls Dorothy and says to forget about the piano. He tells her he's coming over to speak the George. Hazel manages to use a little of her psychology to get both men to accept the furniture. Donnelly Rhodes as Joe.
| 14 | 14 | "Hazel's Dog Days" | William D. Russell | Robert Riley Crutcher | January 4, 1962 |
Dorothy's friend Louise James is going to Europe because her husband Harvey is being sent there as a foreign correspondent. She mentions that she can't take her dog with. Louise offers Pierre to the Baxters, but they can't accept because of Smiley. Hazel finds a way to trick George into sending Smiley to the Harris (Dan Sheridan) obedience school. Dorothy and Hazel meet the Trainer (Don Kennedy) at the school. Harris recognizes Smiley as the dog stolen from one of the staff's other clients. Mr. Wagner (Wendell Holmes) and his daughter Sandra, the rightful owners, later come to the Baxter home to claim him. They call the dog Mickey. That night, Smiley comes back to the Baxter house. The next morning George has Mr. Wagner and Sandra come to get the dog again. Hazel comes by with Pierre and has the dog do some tricks for Sandra. Sandra asks if she can keep Pierre. She tells her father that she really loves Mickey more, but she can tell that Harold loves Mickey. And Mickey came back to the Baxter house, so he must love them.
| 15 | 15 | "Replacement for Phoebe" | William D. Russell | Teleplay by James B. Allardice; Story by James Fonda | January 11, 1962 |
Hazel wins another sports bet with George. The Johnson's tell Hazel that their maid Phoebe up and quit. Hazel volunteers to help them until they find another maid. George is not thrilled about Hazel bouncing back and forth between homes. Hazel upsets George when she ties up the phone trying to find a maid. Hazel tests new candidates by giving them a trial run with the Baxters. George's client, Mr. Sprague, asks Hazel if she could find a maid for him. Hazel finds Gertrude (Elvia Allman), an extremely efficient maid, but she doesn't last a day with the Johnsons. Gertrude was too rigid in her scheduling. Hazel then gets Agnes, a maid that's a bit clumsy, and the Johnsons love her. Hazel sends Gertrude over to Mr. Sprague. Claire Carleton as Elizabeth.
| 16 | 16 | "Hazel's Famous Recipes" | William D. Russell | Robert Riley Crutcher | January 18, 1962 |
Barney the Mailman brings back Hazel's cookbook. After eight publishers reject her cookbook, Hazel begins to question her own recipes. Dorothy tries to cheer her up, but says something that makes Hazel feel worse. To prove her recipes are still good, she tries one out of another cookbook. Even though it doesn't taste good, Dorothy and George rave about it because they think it's her recipe and they want to support her. Now Hazel's feelings are really hurt. George goes to see Mr. Fenton about publishing Hazel's book. When George offers to put up some money, Fenton realizes the recipes must be good. He doesn't take George's money. Fenton comes by the house with Hazel's contract. He also brought with him Mr. Hathaway, the photographer. However, the idea of an extended book tour is upsetting to both Hazel and the Baxters. Bad news is actually good news when Hazel finds out her recipes can't be published because she got them from her mother, who in turn got them from a cookbook which is still under copyright.
| 17 | 17 | "Hazel's Tough Customer" | William D. Russell | Louella MacFarlane | January 25, 1962 |
Harvey Griffin is at the Baxters and George hopes it won't be an all day affair. Hazel learns from Rosie that Barney is going out with Maybell. She gets a call from Charley (Norman Leavitt), who asks her out. Harvey announces that he bought a house in the neighborhood. When he finds out what Hazel's cooking, Harvey invites himself for dinner. Harvey asks Dorothy to decorate his house. George doesn't think she should do it because Harvey is very difficult to work with. Hazel bets George that Dorothy can handle Harvey. Dorothy soon finds out how demanding Harvey can be. George thinks Harvey wants to hire her, but Harvey proposes to Hazel. Harvey gives her a day to decide. That night, George dreams that Hazel marries Harvey and enjoys her new found wealth. She also fires George. Hazel has a nightmare that she is marrying Harvey but her sailor sweetheart Gus (Charles Tannen) returns. When Harvey comes by for her answer, Hazel turns him down. Harvey now wants to sell the house, but Dorothy insists he keep it.
| 18 | 18 | "Hazel's Secret Wish" | William D. Russell | Teleplay by William Cowley & Peggy Chantler Dick & Louella MacFarlane Story by Louella MacFarlane | February 1, 1962 |
Dorothy's friend Edith Stone (Peg LaCentra) offers Hazel a free two-week vacation at the exclusive resort, Rancho Verde. Meanwhile, wealthy Mrs. Forbes-Craigie (Kathryn Givney) arrives at Rancho Verde. Mrs. Camden (Jean Engstrom), the resort hostess, introduces her to two other women, Elaine Willoughby (Betty Lou Gerson) and Louise Carter (Maxine Stuart). Mrs. Camden says that the three women and a Hazel Burke will be doing the activities together. Hazel arrives and is shown to her room. There she meets Anna, a maid from France. Anna is engaged to a boy in the Army. Mrs. Camden asks Hazel not to tell people she's a maid, in deference to the resorts wealthy clientele. Elaine and Louise try to impress Mrs. Forbes-Craigie without much luck. Hazel actually befriends Mrs. Forbes-Craigie, much to the surprise of the other snobbish women. Hazel finds Anna crying. Her boyfriend is being transferred to Michigan. Anna can't go to see him off because Mrs. Camden says they are short-handed. So Anna can go, Hazel fills in for her. Mrs. Forbes-Craigie stands by Hazel even when it comes out that she is a maid.
| 19 | 19 | "Hazel, the Tryst-Buster" | William D. Russell | William Cowley & Peggy Chantler Dick | February 8, 1962 |
Hazel is driving George crazy with her using her word of the day. Trudy Garson (Kathie Browne), an old girlfriend of George's, calls him after a fight with her husband Fred (Walter Reed). Despite it being late at night, she wants George to meet her at the hotel she's staying at. Trudy tells George she wants a divorce, because she believes Fred doesn't care about her anymore. Trudy calls her mother, Mrs. Arnold (Sheila Bromley), to let her know what's going on and where she is. George tells Trudy he will not help her get a divorce. Hazel becomes convinced that Trudy wants to steal George away from Dorothy. Hazel notices lipstick on George's collar. Not wanting Dorothy to see the lipstick, Hazel sneaks into George's bedroom, but he catches her. The next morning, Dorothy tells Hazel that George told her about the lipstick. Trudy calls George and tells him she spoke to Fred. She says that she told Fred that George had advised a divorce and Fred is now furious. Fred apparently is going to punch George in the nose. Trudy is happy because that means Fred still cares. George comes up with a plan to bring Trudy and Fred back together. George and Fred stage a physical fight between themselves.
| 20 | 20 | "The Investment Club" | William D. Russell | Teleplay by William Cowley & Peggy Chantler Dick & James Fonda; Story by James Fonda | February 15, 1962 |
Hazel has been doing a lot of nice things for George. He figures out why. Hazel wants George to give investment advice to the Sunshine Girls, but he refuses. George's mooching cousin Charles Parkins comes by to see Hazel. George tries to avoid running into him, but it doesn't work. Charles is selling Brazilian oil stocks now. Charles tells Hazel that his boss would be happy to talk to the girls and show them a film. Howard Porter (J. Edward McKinley) and Hal Gordon (John Astin), the dealers, are using subliminal suggestion in the film to try to sell the worthless stock. Hazel has the ladies meet at the Baxter home. Howard makes his presentation and shows the film. George becomes suspicious of the dealers. The next day Hazel goes to the grocery and buys Brazilian coffee. Many of the other Sunshine Girls do the same. Charlie finds out about the subliminal suggestion and brings Mr. Richards from the Better Business Bureau to the next meeting. The Sunshine Girls don't buy the stock and Mr. Richards takes away Howard and Hal. Gertrude Flynn as Hilda.
| 21 | 21 | "Hazel's Mona Lisa Grin" | William D. Russell | Robert Riley Crutcher | March 1, 1962 |
George's snobby sister Deirdre is having her new house decorated by a New York designer, Mr. Williams (Ralph Clanton). Harold accidentally breaks a crystal vase that Dorothy just bought and Hazel takes the blame for him. She decides to sell some of her heirlooms to pay for the vase. Hazel has Charlie the Antique dealer (Mario Siletti) come by to price her things. One of the items she sells is a painting of herself as a child done by James Whitehead. George calls art critic Mr. Bowles (Howard Wendell) and learns James Whitehead was a famous artist. His paintings sell for thousands. George goes to Charlie's shop to try and get the painting back. Charlie had already sold it. What George doesn't know is that Mr. Williams bought the painting and it is hanging over Deirdre's mantle. Mr. Bowles is at her house with a crowd of people and authenticates the painting. Deirdre is stunned when she learns the painting is of Hazel, who is there serving people. Everyone thinks the painting is worth thousands, until they find out Hazel painted over parts of it long ago. Feeling bad, Harold eventually admits to breaking the vase. At first George is upset that Hazel didn't let Harold take the responsibility, but then he thanks her for being such a good friend to Harold.
| 22 | 22 | "Hazel and the Gardener" | William D. Russell | William Cowley & Peggy Chantler Dick | March 8, 1962 |
Hazel tries to get George out of the house before their gardener Ernie Talbet (O. Z. Whitehead) shows up. George feels that Ernie isn't doing his job and wants to fire him. Hazel explains that he's been feeling bad since his girlfriend of five years dumped him. George caves in and gives him a second chance. Hazel keeps trying to cheer Ernie up. To boost his moral, Hazel agrees to go on a date with Ernie. Ernie suggests bowling, but Hazel is such a good bowler she says no. They go to shoot pool, but Hazel does so well there she makes Ernie feel inferior. Ernie wants to take Hazel home, but she has one more place she wants to go. They then go to a shooting booth at a carnival. Ernie does really well there. He also hits it off with Florence Gurney (Joan Tompkins), the woman running the stand. Florence gives Ernie her phone number. It's been a couple months and George tells Ernie he's turned the Baxter home into a show place. Ernie announces that he's marrying Florence in two weeks. Henry Beckman as Carnival Pitchman.
| 23 | 23 | "Dorothy's Birthday" | William D. Russell | William Cowley & Peggy Chantler Dick | March 15, 1962 |
George complains because Hazel is giving him a hard time about his weight. He says that she'll feed anyone that comes by, but she restricts the amount of food he can have. Just then Fred Archibald (Sam Edwards), the milkman, comes by and he's had some of Hazel's pancakes. Hazel tells Barney that she's giving up her day off to prepare a dinner and cake for Dorothy's birthday. When Dorothy has to host a last minute bridge luncheon, Hazel says she won't have time to make the cake. She really will have time, but wants to surprise Dorothy. When one of the ladies doesn't show up, Dorothy asks Hazel to fill in for the bridge game. Hazel winds up annoying Jane Edwards (Joan Banks). Because Hazel had to help with the luncheon, George decides to give her the rest of the day off. He'll take Dorothy and Harold out to eat. All alone at home, Hazel calls several friends but they are all busy. While at dinner, Harold tells of Hazel's surprise. The family leaves the restaurant to have dinner and cake with Hazel at home. Ollie O'Toole as Charlie. Note: Portions of this episode are directly from the original unaired pilot which starred Edward Andrews as George Baxter. Most of the scenes with Andrews were re-filmed with Don DeFore, although some scenes with Andrews were eliminated entirely from the DeFore version. Note that the interior set for the Baxters' house in this pilot episode is slightly different from the other episodes.
| 24 | 24 | "Number, Please?" | William D. Russell | William Cowley & Peggy Chantler Dick | March 22, 1962 |
Mr. Sutherland (Vinton Hayworth), an important client, is upset because his meeting with George was interrupted by a phone call from Hazel asking George to pick up some groceries. Sutherland has to go to London on a business trip. George is tired of getting telephone calls from salesmen, so he insists on switching to an unlisted number. The switch is made, but the slip of paper with the new number gets destroyed. George stubbornly insists he remembers it. Of course, he doesn't and all the family's calls are going to a small taxicab company. To make matters worse, George has given Mr. Sutherland that same bad number. Sutherland was going to call George on Sunday from London. George can't get the phone number from the phone company until they open on Monday. Hazel talks to Mitch Brady (Dub Taylor), the owner of the Checkerboard cab company. She asks him to please take any messages for the Baxters. Mitch asks Hazel to the movies. George must figure out a way to receive Sutherland's phone call without him finding out about the bad number. George asks Mitch if he could stay at the cab company office on Sunday to get Sutherland's call. Sutherland comes home from London early. He tells Hazel and Dorothy that he'll meet with George in his office Monday morning. Hazel finds a way for George to not think he wasted an entire day at the cab company. Fay Baker as Madeleine Van Dyke.
| 25 | 25 | "Them New Neighbors Is Nice" | William D. Russell | William Cowley & Peggy Chantler Dick | March 29, 1962 |
The Baxters' new neighbors are widower Stan Blake and his children. Stan's teenage son Don asks the movers, Whit (Charles Tannen) and Bob (Fred Graham), if there are any girls in the neighborhood. George hopes that Hazel doesn't get too involved with them as she does with all the other neighbors. Dorothy invites Stan and family over for lunch. Don develops a crush on Dorothy and showers her with attention. Hazel thinks Dorothy should introduce her girlfriends to Stan as he needs a wife. Hazel unwittingly encourages Don in regards to Dorothy. Don visits Dorothy and things are very awkward. Dorothy tells George she definitely has an admirer. Don writes a love poem to Dorothy. George is getting upset, but Hazel just thinks Don's looking for a mother. Hazel realizes that she was encouraging Don. Hazel manages to get Don to give up on Dorothy and develop an interest in the local girls.
| 26 | 26 | "Hazel's Pajama Party" | William D. Russell | William Cowley & Peggy Chantler Dick | April 5, 1962 |
George gets upset because Hazel is spending so much time at the Blake house. He also doesn't like that the Blake children are in his house all the time. Dorothy and George watch as a strange little boy comes in the kitchen and helps himself to a cookie. Dorothy tells Hazel she shouldn't let people take advantage of her. Hazel mentions that when she was a teenager, her mother died and she had to take care of the family. Hazel would like to have a pajama party for Linda (Brenda Scott), the daughter of Stan Blake. Dorothy doesn't mind as long as George says it's OK. Dorothy talks to George and he's fine with it. Not knowing that Dorothy spoke to him, Hazel butters George up to get his permission. Linda's worried that the boys wouldn't know how to reach them. She tells Hazel that they should have the pajama party at the Blake house. Linda informs Dorothy that the other girls don't want Hazel at the party. George and Dorothy have their own slumber party for Hazel. The girls next door hear all the fun that the Baxters are having and ask if they can join them.
| 27 | 27 | "Three Little Cubs" | William D. Russell | Louella MacFarlane | April 12, 1962 |
Dorothy and George are playing cards with Anne (Alix Talton) and Dr. Bruce Kingsley (Henry Hunter). Dorothy tries to talk Anne into letting her son William join the Cub Scouts. Bruce is too busy with his dentist practice and Anne thinks William's too advanced to care about the Scouts. Hazel and Dorothy still try to get William interested. At his first cub meeting, William does prove to be difficult and a show off. Hazel goes to talk to Bruce about William, but winds up getting her teeth worked on. George tells Hazel that Bruce and Anne thought about it and will come to the next Scout meeting. Harold doesn't want William to join as all the boys think he is a snob and wants everything his way. At the next meeting, William starts out being a show off again. But when William and Harold help each other out of a tree, all the boys and William's parents realize he will make a good scout. Rickie Sorensen as Sid, scout leader. Mary Treen as a Nurse.
| 28 | 28 | "Bringing Out the Johnsons" | William D. Russell | Louella MacFarlane | April 19, 1962 |
George is on TV promoting proposition A, aid for education, in the upcoming special election. George learns that Harvey Griffin is against it. The Johnsons, Herbert and Harriet, offer their home as a polling place. The Johnsons send out invitations for the election offering refreshments and door prizes. Griffin says that amounts to buying votes. Griffin bets George, Dorothy and Hazel that they won't get 50 pecent of the precinct. It's the day of the election and at first the voter turnout is very slow. Hazel talks George into going out to try to get more "yes" votes. After increasing his bet with Hazel, Harvey goes out to round up some "no" votes. Dorothy goes to get votes as well. They wind up getting 100 percent of the precinct. Despite the fact that the Baxters and the Johnsons forgot to vote, the proposition carried and the Baxters win their bet.
| 29 | 29 | "Hazel Quits" | William D. Russell | Keith Fowler & Phil Leslie | April 26, 1962 |
Hazel is interviewed for a local TV show and she criticizes the draining of a local lake to make way for an electronics factory. She also mentions that she works for the prominent attorney, George Baxter. She doesn't know that George's client Mr. Wheeler (John Litel) wants to buy the property for the project. After seeing the interview, Mr. Wheeler demands that George fire Hazel. George won't do it and resigns as Mr. Wheeler's lawyer. Hazel doesn't want George to lose all that money. Hazel tells George that she quits. She tells Dorothy that she's not really quitting, but wants George to believe it for now. She briefly works as a replacement for the Johnsons vacationing maid in order to have Mr. Wheeler think George did fire her. Hazel tells the Johnsons her plan and to not tell George. That night during dinner, George catches Hazel bringing in food to the kitchen. He says he'll go along with Hazel's plan to fool Mr. Wheeler. The factory deal goes through. Hazel learns that her friend Chet Cooper (Charles Seel), who ran a boat service on the lake, was promised a job at the new factory. He's very happy about and now so is Hazel. Larry Thor as Announcer.
| 30 | 30 | "Hazel the Matchmaker" | William D. Russell | Edward Kirsch | May 3, 1962 |
Harold's teacher, Miss Lewis (Renee Godfrey), is at the house talking to Dorothy about Harold. Hazel asks Miss Lewis why she never got married. Hazel and Dorothy decide to bring together their widowed neighbor Stan Blake with Miss Lewis. However, George has his own plans to match Stan with a woman from his office, Mimi Lewis (Doris Singleton). George has Mimi over to meet Stan. Hazel invites Miss Lewis over under the premise of helping Harold with his math. But Mimi doesn't let Stan spend any time with Miss Lewis. Stan goes out with Mimi several times over the next two weeks. Stan doesn't know yet that Mimi is quite the gold-digger. At the beauty parlor, Rosie hears Mimi say that if she does marry Stan, she plans to send the 4 kids to boarding school. Rosie tells Hazel. Hazel learns that Stan does plan to ask Mimi to marry him. Mimi asks George if she could continue receiving alimony if she remarries. Hazel arranges for Mimi to have dinner with Stan's family. Hazel finds a way to have Mimi's true feelings come out and save Stan from making a bad decision. Hazel then arranges for Miss Lewis to come over.
| 31 | 31 | "Rock-a-Bye Baby" | William D. Russell | Peggy Chantler Dick | May 10, 1962 |
Hazel is reading her diary to George and Dorothy. In one part, Hazel makes fun of one of Dorothy's suitors. It turns out to be George. Mrs. Johnson's niece Angela (Patricia McNulty) and husband David Watson (Don Dorrell) are visiting with their baby. They will leave it with the Johnsons to take a short vacation. Harriet says that the nurse they hired, Miss Simmons (Mary Grace Canfield), won't arrive until late this afternoon. Hazel volunteers to help with the baby. When George hears about the baby, he's worried Hazel will spend half her time over there. George is having a poker party and needs Hazel to prep the food. Hazel finds some of Harold's old baby things in the attic and will bring them to the Johnsons. Hazel gets Rosie to make dinner for the Baxters. Miss Simmons arrives and she is very rude. After the Johnsons fire Miss Simmons, Hazel says the baby can stay with the Baxters. George has serious reservations when Hazel asks him to feed the child. George and his poker buddies sing to the baby.
| 32 | 32 | "The Burglar in Mr. B's PJ's" | William D. Russell | William Cowley | May 17, 1962 |
Hazel finds a way to get George to buy her a new iron. Peter Warren (Alan Hale Jr.) breaks into the Baxter's house while they are out for the night. Hazel takes his picture and hits him on the head with a baseball bat. He only broke in to get some food because he has endured a long string of bad luck. Hazel feels sorry for him. She feeds him and has him spend the night. George and Dorothy come home and find Peter in the guest bedroom. At first George thinks it's a cousin he never met. Hazel explains things and convinces them to let Peter stay. The next morning, Peter finds Dorothy's diamond earrings and gives them to Hazel. Not knowing that, George believes Peter stole the earrings and calls the police. Once they realize it was all a mistake, George refuses to sign a complaint. The police still take him away to check him out, but George manages to get him freed. Hazel talks George into letting Peter stay with them until he finds a place.
| 33 | 33 | "Heat Wave" | William D. Russell | Louella MacFarlane | May 24, 1962 |
Hazel finds out from Barney that the family that Rosie works for had air conditioning installed in their home. Hazel pesters George to have air conditioning installed at his house. George refuses because it would cost too much. Meanwhile, George is upset that he hasn't been made a partner at his law firm yet. If it doesn't happen soon, George will resign. George invites his boss, Mr. Butterworth over for dinner in hopes of getting the promotion. Hazel gets a little annoyed that Barney spends time with Rosie because of the air conditioning. Hazel wheels and deals between Mrs. Merryweather's (Virginia Gregg) Antique shop and Charlie's shop to finally be able to get a portable air conditioner. The Butterworths arrive for dinner. With help from Hazel's meal and the air conditioner, George is made a full partner. Hazel says now that George is a partner, maybe he can afford to air condition the whole house.
| 34 | 34 | "George's Assistant" | William D. Russell | Robert Riley Crutcher | May 31, 1962 |
Hazel is at the graduation of her friend Mr. Merrick's (Nesdon Booth) son Alan (Don Spruance) from law school. Hazel learns from Alan's friend Jack Chambers (William Beckley) that Alan was going to open a law office in a nearby town, but gave up the idea. Jack says that Alan won't talk about it. Being overworked, George is thinking of hiring an assistant to help him at his law office. Hazel thinks it is a great idea and would like to suggest Alan. She calls Alan and tells him to come over. Mr. Griffin brings over Gail Sanders (Maggie Pierce), who just graduated law school and happens to be gorgeous. George would like to speak with Alan as well, as George thinks he may prefer a male assistant. Alan arrives and sees Gail, who happens to be his ex-girlfriend. Alan tells Hazel that he and Gail were engaged and hoped to open a law practice together. They couldn't agree on which town to do it or the size of the practice. Hazel finds a way to get the couple back together.
| 35 | 35 | "Hazel's Day" | William D. Russell | Peggy Chantler Dick | June 7, 1962 |
Deirdre shows Harold the Baxter family tree. Harold wants to know why Hazel isn't in it. Harold realizes there is a Mother's Day and a Father's Day, but no day to celebrate Hazel. So the family makes tomorrow, Sunday, Hazel's Day and plans a dinner out. Deirdre wants George to meet Judge Clem Farley (Walter Woolf King), an important judge, on the same evening. Dorothy convinces George that Hazel is more important. Mitch comes by with his new taxi. Mitch reminds Hazel they have a date for tomorrow. Harold suggests Mitch go with them to dinner. George tells Deirdre and she is furious. The next day, the family serves Hazel breakfast in bed and gives her a present. Hazel gets a call from Deirdre's maid and then tells Dorothy and George she's too sick to go out to dinner. They know Hazel is faking it so Deirdre won't be mad at George. The Baxter's take Hazel and Mitch out to dinner. Deirdre and the Judge wind up at the same restaurant. Clem knows Hazel from school and joins her for the dinner, much to Dierdre's disbelief. Hazel gets her picture in the paper with Clem. Theodore Newton as Dr. Carroll, the Pastor. Eddie Baker as Churchgoer. George DeNormand as Churchgoer. Note: This episode was the last to be shown in black-and-white. This was actually the pilot episode with some scenes re-filmed when the part of Mr.B was re-cast with Don Defore replacing Edward Andrews.

=== Season 2 (1962–63) ===
This is the first color season; all following seasons are also in color.

| No. overall | No. in season | Title | Directed by | Written by | Original release date |
|---|---|---|---|---|---|
| 36 | 1 | "Hazel's Cousin" | William D. Russell | Robert Riley Crutcher | September 20, 1962 |
Hazel has a highly successful cousin named Susie (Rosemary DeCamp). She's in the cosmetics industry and goes by the name Sybil. Hazel and the Baxters are watching Susie on TV being interviewed by Mr. Prior (Harold Gould). Susie announces that she is preparing to marry the well-known society figure John Lucius (John Archer). When Susie's snobbish social secretary June Lowell (Jean Engstrom) learns that Hazel is a maid, she removes Hazel's name from Susie's guest list. For two weeks Hazel has been asking Barney the Mailman (Robert B. Williams) where her wedding invitation is. June suggests to Susie that she offer Hazel a more prominent job. Susie and June come to visit Hazel and Hazel invites the Sunshine Girls over. June keeps trying to talk Susie out of allowing Hazel to come to the wedding. June tells George that Hazel isn't welcome at the wedding. Susie overhears this and fires June. Still determined that Hazel not appear at the wedding, June calls Hazel from the airport and tells her she is not welcome. Hazel makes an excuse for her not being able to attend the wedding. Realizing what has happened, Susie has John call Hazel and invite her. Maudie Prickett as Rosie.
| 37 | 2 | "Rosie's Contract" | William D. Russell | Peggy Chantler Dick | September 27, 1962 |
Dr. Craig, Rosie's boss, is having George help him draw up a five-year contract for Rosie. Despite promising Dr. Craig she wouldn't say anything to Hazel about the contract, Rosie hints that she has a legal document. George does tell Hazel about Rosie's contract. At first Hazel says that she has no interest in a contract. Hazel has a dream that she's been replaced by a robot (Robby the Robot). George dreams that Hazel went to work for Mr. Griffin and George hasn't had a decent meal since. George and Hazel decide she should be signed to a similar deal as Rosie's. Dorothy doesn't think it's a good idea. After each have another bad dream, George and Hazel realize how silly and unnecessary a contract would be.
| 38 | 3 | "We've Been So Happy Till Now" | William D. Russell | William Cowley | October 4, 1962 |
Fulton the milkman (Jonathan Hole) comes by. He is depressed because he and Hazel have been spending time together, but there's no romance. He tells Hazel he's crazy about her. Hazel does like him, but not in that way. George and Dorothy stop speaking to each other following an argument at a party the night before. Hazel asks George what the fight was about, but he tells her to mind her own business. Hazel meets Fulton in the park. Rosie comes by and tells Hazel she heard about the Baxters fight. Hazel's friend Zoltan (Steven Geray) comes by. He's working in the park because the restaurant where he played violin closed down. Arlene then comes by and asks Hazel if the Baxters are getting a divorce. Hazel has to leave and Fulton is upset because he didn't get to talk to her. Hazel learns from Mert (Queenie Leonard) that the argument was over how Hazel pampers Dorothy and George feels like a third wheel. Hazel's first attempt to bring the two together backfires. Hazel sets up a romantic dinner and hires Zoltan to play the violin. Fulton comes by and wants to know what Zoltan is doing there. Before Zoltan can start to play, Dorothy and George make up.
| 39 | 4 | "How to Lure and Epicure" | William D. Russell | Robert Riley Crutcher | October 11, 1962 |
George's friend Mr. Tonetti (Peter Mamakos) opens a new restaurant, but business is not so good. Part of the reason is the secluded location of the restaurant. Mr. Tonetti must focus all his energies on impressing Alexander Templeton (Alan Hewitt), a snobby restaurant critic, in hopes of getting more customers. Unfortunately, Templeton is not impressed with the food. Hazel goes to see Templeton, but is quickly sent away. George had no luck getting an extension on Tonetti's bank loan. Hazel comes up with a plan to get Templeton back to Mr. Tonetti's restaurant. George enlists the help of his client Mr. Williams, who happens to be Templeton's publisher. There, Hazel, Mert and Flo (Florence Sundstrom) make sure the critic has a meal to remember. However, Templeton finds out that it was Hazel and the girls that cooked the meal and still doesn't give the restaurant a good review. Days later the Baxter's and Hazel go to the restaurant and it is packed. It turns out there was a critic from the local paper there the night Templeton was there and gave the restaurant a rave review. Tonetti now serves the recipes that Hazel and the girls cooked.
| 40 | 5 | "Barney Hatfield, Where Are You?" | William D. Russell | Louella MacFarlane | October 18, 1962 |
Hazel is surprised when a substitute mailman comes to the door. She calls Postal Supervisor Mr. Cranston to find out what happened to Barney. Cranston says that Barney called in sick. Hazel goes to Barney's apartment. When no one answers the door, Hazel goes in through an open window. Cranston arrives and they find Barney isn't home. Hazel says he may be at the doctor. Later, Hazel, George and Dorothy go back to Barney's house and find a depressing poem he had written. They then go on the hunt for Barney using an autographed photo of burlesque dancer Boo-Boo Bedoux (Corrine Cole) as a clue. A coffee shop counterman (Jamie Farr), who went to school with her, tells them where they can find Boo-Boo. They speak with Boo-Boo, but she isn't much help. It's not long before many more people are keeping an eye out for Barney. The next morning Cranston comes by the Baxter house. Barney shows up and it turns out he went on a fishing trip. At first everyone is mad and Hazel tells him the people on his route took a collection for his safe return. But then they forgive him. Cyril Delevanti as Elderly Man.
| 41 | 6 | "A Four-Bit Word to Chew On" | William D. Russell | William Cowley | October 25, 1962 |
Bob the bread man comes by and Hazel tells him she's picking her word of the day. George and Hazel try to stump each other with the definition and spelling of words. Meanwhile, Harvey Griffin (Howard Smith) wants George to set up an educational foundation for disadvantaged youth. Harvey mentions that he didn't finish grade school. His family was poor and he had to work. Griffin wants to make George the administrator of the foundation. Harvey would like a brownie, but Hazel thinks he's gained weight. Harvey tries to pull a fast one when Hazel makes him weigh himself. Hazel realizes what he did and gives him part of a brownie. When George and Hazel spell words in front of him, Griffin takes offense at the perceived slight at his lack of education. Griffin proceeds to fire George. George says he will not crawl for any man. Hazel feels bad that she caused this problem. Hazel gets Mr. Griffin to apologize and rehire George. Harvey also wants Hazel to be on the board of the foundation.
| 42 | 7 | "Hazel's Tax Deduction" | William D. Russell | Robert Riley Crutcher | November 1, 1962 |
Harvey Griffin tells George that he is going to ask Mrs. Grace Fowler (Viola Harris) to marry him. Harvey shows George his IRS refund check. George will complain to the Internal Revenue Service that he hasn't received his refund yet. He calls Mr. Floyd (Maurice Manson) of the IRS. George goes to Mr. Floyd's office and after some doing, he gets things straightened out. Hazel had to bring some of George's business records. While waiting for George's refund check, Hazel claims to Mr. Floyd that George didn't deduct enough for her services to his clients. Mr. Floyd now calls for a full audit of George's return to maybe get George more money. Mr. Floyd sends Mr. Perkins (Robert Cornthwaite) and a group of examiners to the Baxter house. Hazel now worries about what she started. At home, George asks Hazel where his check is. Perkins and the examiners arrive. George and Dorothy won't be able to go to Harvey's cocktail party. George tells Hazel to call Harvey. Hazel inadvertently causes snobby Mrs. Fowler to not accept a wedding proposal from Harvey. Griffin fires George. Realizing what Hazel did was for the best, Harvey helps to get the IRS to give George a larger refund and he hires George back.
| 43 | 8 | "Mr. B on the Bench" | William D. Russell | William Cowley | November 8, 1962 |
Barney is playing cards with Hazel. Arnold Winters (Willis Bouchey), president of the State Bar Association, calls George and would like to stop by. Winters arrives and George is offered a chance at a judicial position, along with two other men. The Governor will make the final decision. George would like a day to think it over. After thinking about it for quite some time, George tells Mr. Winters he will accept the appointment if it's offered to him. Winters tells George that until it's decided, he must keep this quiet. A proud Hazel spreads all over town that he is already a judge. Among others, she tells Rosie, Flo and Mert. When George finds out what Hazel did, he is furious as he will now have to turn down the possible offer. Before George can yell at her, Hazel gives him a gavel as a gift and says how proud she is. She tells George she loves him like a brother. George calms down and makes up a story how he is not in a financial position to take the job just yet.
| 44 | 9 | "License to Wed" | William D. Russell | Louella MacFarlane | November 15, 1962 |
Deirdre's (Cathy Lewis) daughter Nancy (Davey Davison) is dating Hazel's nephew Eddie (Johnny Washbrook). Deirdre does not want this since she thinks Eddie is not good enough for her daughter. Eddie finds out that he got a scholarship to the university. Deirdre and Nancy are coming over for dinner. George invites Eddie as well. That night, Nancy mentions that she would like to transfer to Eddie's school. She could see him more. Deirdre says no. Nancy and Eddie become engaged. Dorothy tells Hazel the more Deirdre tries to drive Nancy and Eddie apart, the more she pushes them together. The next day Dorothy calls George at the office. Deirdre and Nancy had a fight when they got home last night. Now Nancy is gone. Hazel thinks they are still too young to marry and uses psychology to prevent it. Hazel buys them a wedding license. She tells Eddie he'd have to give up his scholarship and get a job. Nancy says that she'll get a job and Eddie can still go to school. Hazel finds them a place to live and it's in terrible shape. Eddie and Nancy decide to not get married just yet. Molly Dodd as Miss Scott, George's Secretary.
| 45 | 10 | "Genie with the Light Brown Lamp" | William D. Russell | Robert Riley Crutcher | November 22, 1962 |
The Baxters lose their dog Smiley on a road trip. All Harold can do is think about his dog. Harold's teacher, Miss Tilcy (Virginia Gregg), comes by to talk with Harold's parents about his grades slipping. Hazel tells her about Smiley. Miss Tilcy comes up with a suggestion on how to get Harold's mind off of Smiley. A package is delivered with Smiley's collar. A Service Station man found Smiley, but then the dog got away. Hazel reads Harold a bedtime story about Aladdin and the Magic Lamp. The next day he sees a gravy boat in Charlie's (Mario Siletti) store window and thinks it is a magic lamp. Charlie gives him the gravy boat. Hazel and Dorothy tell Harold there is no such thing as a magic lamp and he shouldn't get his hopes up. However, other things start to happen and Harold thinks it is because of the lamp. George's mooching cousin Charlie Perkins comes by. Because of some unusual circumstances, a man named Harrison (Paul Smith) is able to bring Smiley home. As a thank you, they invite Harrison to stay for Thanksgiving dinner.
| 46 | 11 | "The Natural Athlete" | William D. Russell | William Cowley | November 29, 1962 |
If Harold eats all his vegetables for a month, Hazel will teach him how to bowl. George becomes jealous that Harold idolizes Hazel's championship bowling streak. George tells Dorothy that at one time he was a very good bowler. Hazel wins another tournament. George goes to the bowling alley and speaks with Alex (Bing Russell) about getting a ball and shoes. George is to take lessons from Jack Ballard (Bill Zuckert), the bowling instructor. So no one finds out, George goes under the assumed name of Willard Armbruster. George does tell Dorothy. He wants to gain Harold's admiration. Jack tells Hazel about Willard and how he hopes to enter the next tournament. George feels he's gotten good enough to enter the weekly tournament. Hazel finds out that George has been taking the lessons. George beats Hazel and winds up winning the tournament. The next morning Harold asks George if he won. George tells him to check the paper. Harold is disappointed to see that Willard Armbruster won.
| 47 | 12 | "New Man in Town" | William D. Russell | Peggy Chantler Dick | December 13, 1962 |
Hazel and Rosie are competing for the affections of handsome Latin chauffeur Pablo Rivera (Robert Lowery). Barney asks Rosie to go with him to the Sunshine Girls picnic as he figures Hazel is going with Mitch Brady (Dub Taylor). But Rosie hopes to go with Pablo, so she tells Barney to ask Flo. Hazel invites Pablo over for dinner. Dorothy doesn't want to see Hazel hurt, so she tells her to forget about Pablo. Mitch and Harold will be performing some songs at the picnic and Hazel will introduce the pair. Mitch and Harold are practicing in the Baxter's kitchen. Mitch asks Hazel to be his date for the picnic, but she turns him down. Just then Pablo comes by and then Rosie. Rosie starts flirting with Pablo and Hazel gets her to leave. Mitch also leaves. George is afraid that Pablo will take advantage of Hazel's good nature. Hazel gets a date with Pablo to go to the picnic. A disappointed Mitch then asks Rosie. Mitch comes by and tells Harold that they will be practicing at Rosie's house from now on. He also says that Rosie will be introducing them at the picnic. When Hazel realizes how her date with Pablo is effecting Mitch and little Harold, she tells Rosie to go with Pablo.
| 48 | 13 | "Herbert for Hire" | William D. Russell | William Cowley | December 20, 1962 |
Herbert Johnson has had a check bounce on him. George tells the Johnson's that they are having some financial problems. Their stock investments consist of extremely outdated and failing businesses. George tells Herbert that he needs to cut back on expenses. Hazel gives Herbert and Harriet some suggestions. Hazel also helps them let their maid Roberta go. Hazel suggests that maybe Herbert get a job, despite his lone credential being his degree in ancient languages. Meanwhile, Mr. Griffin is telling George about his upcoming shareholders meeting. George helps get rid of one of Harvey's shareholders, Mrs. Totter (Eleanor Audley). George gets Harvey to agree to interview Herbert. Hazel refuses to make any more brownies for Mr. Griffin unless he gives Mr. Johnson a job. Griffin gives Herbert a job handling annoying shareholders like Mrs. Totter. Joan Tompkins as Miss Adams, Harvey's secretary.
| 49 | 14 | "Hazel and the Lovebirds" | William D. Russell | Peggy Chantler Dick | December 27, 1962 |
Nancy calls Hazel and tells her she hates the private school she is at and she misses Eddie. Hazel meets Gabriella (Susan Silo), the Johnson's new maid. Deirdre and Harry come for a visit. George and Dorothy tell them that Nancy is miserable at school. Eddie tells Hazel that he got a letter from Nancy. Deirdre will allow Nancy to move back from private school on the condition that she date other boys. Nancy writes that it will just be a waste of time for the other boys because she loves him. Though Deirdre hasn't met him yet, she arranges for Nancy to meet a boy that is up to Deirdre's standard. Nancy meets gas station attendant Bud Donovan (Robert Hogan) and gives him her phone number. Despite going to the same university, Deirdre won't let Nancy date Bud because of his job. Bud drops off the Johnson's car that had been worked on at his gas station. Hazel happens to be there and introduces Bud to Gabriella. Bud and Gabriella arrange a date together. Deirdre finds out that Bud was the boy she wanted to set Nancy up with. Deirdre allows Nancy to see Eddie.
| 50 | 15 | "Top Secret" | William D. Russell | Robert Riley Crutcher | January 3, 1963 |
George and Stan Blake fly to California to meet a Mr. Murdoch on business, but can't get in contact with him. Stan's daughter Mavis is sad that Stan didn't take her with him. Hazel wants to take Mavis to meet visiting Senator Sterling (Larry Gates). At his hotel, Sterling would like to rest a bit. Hazel and Mavis arrive. Sterling pretends he remembers Hazel, but he really doesn't. Meanwhile, George and Stan come home having not found Murdoch. When George hears that Hazel went to see Sterling, he thinks Sterling can get them in touch with Murdoch. Sterling's assistant Mr. Herbert Andrews (Stuart Nisbet) arrives. Mavis inadvertently walks out with highly classified documents that Andrews brought with. Sterling and Andrews go on an all out hunt to find Hazel and Mavis. It takes a bit of doing, but they finally track down Hazel at the Baxter house and retrieve the documents. Meanwhile, George is hunting for the Senator in hopes that he can help with Murdoch, but has no luck finding him. George and Stan return to the Baxter's. The Senator tells George and Stan that he will set up an appointment with Murdoch. Hazel gets Stan to reassure Mavis that he loves her. Sam Edwards as Eddie.
| 51 | 16 | "The Sunshine Girls Quartet" | William D. Russell | Louella MacFarlane | January 10, 1963 |
Hazel, Rosie and a pair of Sunshine Girls team with Mitch to form a musical group. They want to perform at an amateur contest at the state fair. George wants to have Mr. Griffin over for an intimate dinner on his birthday, this Thursday. Thanks to Hazel and Dorothy, it turns into a surprise party with a lot of guests. Mitch tells Hazel and Rosie that he set up an audition in front of a traveling talent scout named Pauline Dunbar (Jean Willes) for Thursday night. Hazel tries to switch the day of the party, but can't. Mitch tries to get Miss Dunbar to visit Griffin's party to listen to the group, but she says she can't make it. Rosie is mad at Hazel because they can't audition. Pauline changes her mind and arrives at the party just when Harvey does. She thinks that George and some of the men singing a fraternity song are the group she is supposed to see. Pauline is not impressed and is about to leave. Hazel and the girls sing a song for Harvey, not knowing that Pauline is there. Pauline likes what she heard and the quartet sings another song. Lauren Gilbert as Harry Noll. George DeNormand as Party Guest.
| 52 | 17 | "A Good Example for Harold" | William D. Russell | Ed Haas & Norm Liebmann | January 17, 1963 |
Rosie tells Hazel that she broke a date with Ernie because he laughed at her new hat. Hazel suggests Rosie go with Barney's cousin Claude to the dance. George tries to use a white lie to get out of meeting with Mr. Herman, an insurance agent. The family catches Harold using the same type of white lie to get out of washing behind his ears. Hazel says everyone has to stop using lies. If someone slips up they have to put a quarter in Harold's bank. Hazel has to tell Rosie that her new hat is funny looking because Harold is standing right there. George mentions that he invited Mr. Boyle (Philip Ober), the creator of a cleaning product and a potential client, to dinner. Barney tells Hazel that Rosie is still mad at her. It could effect their double date to the dance. Boyle shows up very late for dinner. When Boyle asks Hazel what she thinks of his cleaning product, she says that it doesn't work. Boyle demands that George fire Hazel, which George refuses to do. Mr. Boyle storms out of the house, only to come back later and apologize to Hazel. The next day, Rosie comes by with a different hat. This time Hazel, not wanting to hurt Rosie's feelings again, tells a white lie and says it's beautiful. Hazel puts a quarter in Harold's bank.
| 53 | 18 | "Hazel's Highland Fling" | William D. Russell | Robert Riley Crutcher | January 24, 1963 |
Mr. Griffin is continually inviting himself over for dinner. Hazel finds a way to let Harvey know he's been stopping by too much. He mentions that Angie Campbell, his new Scottish cook, doesn't do a good job. George suggests to Mr. Griffin that he pay off her contract and send her back. Angie comes by and meets Dorothy and Hazel. Angie came to America to find her longtime boyfriend Gordie MacHeath (James Doohan). He came to America as a groom for prized Clydesdales. Gordie used to write her all the time, but the letters stopped. Angie's afraid he may have fallen for an American woman. To prevent Mr. Griffin from sending her back, Angie asks Hazel to teach her to cook. At first, George says the matter is out of his hands and Angie will be sent back. It takes a little doing, but Hazel talks him into helping. George hires Murphy the Private Detective (Larry J. Blake), who finds Gordie and brings him to the Baxter home. Gordie is apprehensive because he doesn't know why George had him tracked down. Dorothy mentions Angie is in America. Gordie tells Dorothy that he hadn't been writing Angie because he's been busy earning money so they can get married. Meanwhile, Angie and Hazel are at a salon where Angie is getting made up. Angie and Gordie are happily reunited. Hazel finds a way to stop Harvey from coming by for dinner. Claire Carleton as a Beautician.
| 54 | 19 | "Ain't Walter Nice?" | William D. Russell | William Cowley | January 31, 1963 |
Dorothy tells George that Hazel's nephew Walter Burke (Frank Aletter) will be coming for a visit. George is not happy when Dorothy says that she told Hazel that Walter could stay in the spare room. Walter, a self-described promoter, arrives. Walter has hopes of obtaining a large investment from Mr. Griffin. George and Dorothy begin to question his motives, because he never seems to have any money on him. George is also bothered that Walter is always mooching things and having Hazel wait on him hand and foot. Walter sets up a meeting with Mr. Griffin. Walter tells Hazel about a new type of plastic he hopes Harvey will invest in. After speaking with George, Hazel begins to have her doubts about Walter as well. Hazel goes to warn Mr. Griffin and he says that he had the plastic and Walter checked out and everything is on the up and up. Harvey invests a large sum of money into the project. George would now like to invest in the plastic, but there are no more shares left. Hazel bought the last shares.
| 55 | 20 | "Mr. Griffin Throws a Wedding" | William D. Russell | Peggy Chantler Dick | February 7, 1963 |
Hazel comes by George's office and talks to his stenographer, Maggie. She tells Hazel that she and Pete (Dick Sargent) have set their wedding date, a week from Saturday. Maggie wants a small, simple wedding. They found an apartment with a room where Pete can finish writing his book. Pete, who is Harvey Griffin's nephew, tells Harvey that he's marrying Maggie. Harvey wants to plan a large wedding and he wants Pete to work for him. Pete tries to tell Harvey that they want a small wedding and he wants to write books. Hazel is excited when Harvey asks her to help with the plans. Maggie tells Pete that he needs to put his foot down and refuse the big wedding. Griffin tells Hazel that he wants to buy the couple a large house next to his. Hazel and Dorothy talk Maggie into having the big wedding. The day of the wedding, Maggie tells Hazel that the wedding is off. She found out that Harvey is buying them a house and wants Pete to work for him. Maggie wants Pete to finish his book and stand up to Harvey. Hazel finds a way to get Pete to tell off Harvey and win back the respect of Maggie.
| 56 | 21 | "Hazel and the Stockholder's Meeting" | William D. Russell | Louella MacFarlane | February 14, 1963 |
Hazel owns some stock in the Davidson vacuum cleaner company and asks George's advice about it. Despite it being very expensive, Hazel talks George into buying a high end new Davidson vacuum cleaner. But the new vacuum stops working almost immediately. Hazel calls Mr. Zimmerman (Byron Foulger), the vacuum repair man. Things keep going wrong with the vacuum and there are numerous repairs. When she can't get through to Mr. Starkey (Max Showalter), General Manager of the Davidson company, Hazel decides to attend the company's stockholder meeting. George tells Dorothy that he has to go to the stockholder meeting to vote his and Mr. Griffin's shares. George also says that some shareholders want to replace the president, Mr. Ralph Davidson (James Bell) with Mr. Starkey. Hazel brings the vacuum with her to the meeting. Hazel tells the shareholders all the things that went wrong with the vacuum. In the process, she also helps Mr. Davidson keep his job. Later, Mr. Davidson comes by the house and brings Hazel a new vacuum with her name on it. When they plug it in, it doesn't work. Turns out Harold's electric train caused a fuse to pop. Walter Coy as the Chairman. Stanley Farrar as Stockholder. Arlene Harris as Mrs. Mott.
| 57 | 22 | "Hazel's Day Off" | William D. Russell | Dorothy Cooper | February 21, 1963 |
It's Sunday and it's Hazel's day off. She tells George that the water heater is acting up. Busy Mr. Arden (James Westerfield) tells George that he will only donate land for a new playground if the contract is drawn up that afternoon. Arden is leaving for a six month business trip to Europe later that day. George is at his office working on the contract and Hazel brings him lunch. Hazel is walking in town. Arden bumps into her and knocks her down. Hazel breaks the heel of her shoe and Arden drives her to a shoemaker. Adren introduces himself as Joe and they go to lunch. They become friends, despite the fact that Mr. Arden finds out that Hazel works for George. Arden cancels his trip. Meanwhile, Robert Kemper (William Schallert), Arden's attorney, arrives at George's office. Kemper says he won't wait too long for Arden. Hazel and Arden take a walk in the park. They run into Hazel's friend Cyrano (Percy Helton), who's selling puppets. Kemper has had enough and leaves. Hazel learns that Arden used to be a plumber. Hazel brings him home for dinner and he's working on the water heater. George comes home and realizes Joe is Mr. Arden and everything works out for the best. And Mr. Arden agrees to slow down and take it easy.
| 58 | 23 | "I've Been Singing All My Life" | William D. Russell | William Cowley | February 28, 1963 |
George's sister Deirdre comes by and tells Dorothy that she is planning a talent show to raise money for the local children's hospital. Deirdre says that her singing teacher Mr. Blackpool (Max Showalter) says she's ready to make her debut. There's also a lot of local talent. Deirdre would like Dorothy's help with costumes and sets. Hazel wants to be part of the show and sing. Dorothy thinks they should give Hazel a chance. Meanwhile, society woman Mrs. Loretta Greene (Eleanor Audley) is having a singing lesson with Mr. Blackpool. She isn't very good, but Blackpool is polite. Deirdre persuades Blackpool to make sure Hazel and Rosie do not pass the audition. Hazel is selling tickets quite well, but Deirdre is having trouble. After the auditions, Hazel turns in her ticket money and Deirdre is surprised by the large amount. It's the night of the show. Deirdre suggests to George that Hazel go with them. She is told that Hazel is entertaining at the children's hospital. Deirdre, George and Dorothy arrive at the hospital just as Hazel is singing the children to sleep. Deirdre apologizes to Hazel for what she did to her and Rosie at the audition. Deirdre asks Hazel to sing at the show. Songs: Eleanor sings "Juanita" and "The Last Rose of Summer". Shirley sings "Bye Bye Blackbird".
| 59 | 24 | "The Fire's Never Dead While the Ashes Are Red" | William D. Russell | Robert Riley Crutcher | March 7, 1963 |
Jeremy Webster (Vaughn Taylor), George's former law professor, has written a bestseller and is coming to visit. George wants to have Jeremy's book shown prominently in the house, but learns that Dorothy lent it to a friend. George wants to throw a small dinner party for the professor. Hazel and Dorothy go to buy another copy of Jeremy's book. Hazel finds out that Celeste Morgan (Lurene Tuttle), a local bookstore owner, used to date Jeremy long ago and still has feelings for him. Meanwhile, the small dinner party that George was planning is growing larger and more expensive than he anticipated. Jeremy arrives at the Baxter house. He calls Celeste's bookstore anonymously pretending to look for a book, just so he can hear Celeste's voice. Celeste doesn't let on, but she knows it's him. Hazel shows Jeremy something she took from the bookstore that shows Celeste still thinks of him. Knowing that Jeremy still loves Celeste, she brings him to the bookstore. Hazel finds a way for the two to take a trip together. George's party is getting so big, he has to rent a ballroom. When George gets home, Dorothy tells him that Hazel got Jeremy and Celeste together. George has a panic attack when he learns the couple are leaving on a trip. Hazel brings the couple home and they announce that Jeremy and Celeste are engaged. They decided against the trip and George can still have his party. Sue England as Marie, Celeste's assistant.
| 60 | 25 | "Hazel's Navy Blue Tug-Boats" | William D. Russell | Louella MacFarlane | March 14, 1963 |
Hazel borrows George's car to attend a shoe sale, guaranteeing that she will be back by noon so George can see Mr. Griffin. And on top of that, a briefcase George needs for that meeting is in the car with Hazel. Hazel drives past the Johnson's, who have taken up bicycle riding. Along the way Hazel winds up giving an expectant father (Don Spruance) a ride to the hospital. Coming back from the hospital she is delayed by changing Mr. Johnson's bicycle tire. Meanwhile, George is trying to call the shoe department, but keeps getting transferred to different parts of the department store. Hazel stops at a gas station. There she and Joe the attendant find Anna, a lost girl of a Mexican diplomat who speaks no English. Hazel takes Anna with her to the shoe department. Dorothy finally gets through to the shoe department. But when the clerk says that a person matching Hazel's description has a little girl with her, Dorothy figures that's not Hazel. Before Hazel can get home, a Motorcycle Officer (Hal Baylor), Senora Villanova (Margarita Cordova) and her husband arrive at the Baxter home to pick up Anna. Hazel makes it home before noon and the little girl is reunited with her family. Griffin calls to cancel the meeting with George. Ronald Long as Shoe Salesman.
| 61 | 26 | "The Hazel Walk" | William D. Russell | Ed Haas & Norm Liebmann | March 21, 1963 |
Hazel battles both George and Mr. Griffin in trying to save the Pocono Trail from a super highway they have planned. The alternate route would go through the golf course George plays at. She will be taking people from the highway commission to the trail on an overnight hiking trip. Hazel tries to talk George and Dorothy into going with. Dorothy likes the idea, but George doesn't. Harvey blackmails George into going. Once there, the trail is not as scenic and beautiful as Hazel remembered it. Everyone else agrees that the highway should go through. Some of the people sit in some poison ivy. The stream Hazel wanted to show them had dried up. They camp for the night and Hazel is feeling as though she's fighting a losing battle. It starts to storm. The next morning a Sheriff (Guy Raymond) comes by the camp. He tells them that it's a landslide area, a flood area and a forest fire area. Instead of using the golf course route, the commission decides to use a route that would go through land that Mr.Griffin was going to build a new factory on. Hugh Sanders as Mr. Stettner of the highway commission. Ed Prentiss as Mr. Cormack. Walter Reed as Mr. Murray.
| 62 | 27 | "Hazel Digs a Hole for Herself" | William D. Russell | Louella MacFarlane | March 28, 1963 |
George and Ralph Sutherland (Vinton Hayworth) are discussing a retirement apartment building project. George and Deirdre are worried about their bored and depressed mother (Louise Lorimer). George has Ralph come by to entertain her, but she is not interested. Mrs. Baxter tells Hazel how much fun she had gardening. Hazel mentions that Mr. Griffin has a plot of land that could use sprucing up. With Hazel's help, Mrs. Baxter begins to develop a career as a professional gardener. They go to a garden supply store and have a Salesman (Tyler McVey) help them buy equipment. Mrs. Baxter then buys a pickup truck to haul the equipment from place to place. At first they try to keep it a secret from George and Dorothy. When George finds out, he reluctantly goes along with the idea. Deirdre is driving down the street and is stunned when she sees her mother cutting someone's lawn. Mrs. Baxter explains that she is a gardener now. Deirdre thinks it is menial labor and her mother should not be doing it. And much to Deirdre's surprise, Mrs. Baxter goes on a date with Ralph and flirts with him.
| 63 | 28 | "Hazel Sounds Her 'A'" | William D. Russell | Robert Riley Crutcher | April 11, 1963 |
Mr. Sutherland would like George and Dorothy to meet Sir Horace (Torin Thatcher), the town's new symphony conductor, and his wife, Lady Hobart (Doris Singleton), at the airport. Sir Horace bans women from the orchestra and fires Myra, the daughter of Hazel's friend Mrs. Waverly (Ann Doran). Mrs. Waverly asks Hazel if she could get George to change Sir Horace's mind, but George says there is nothing he can do. Sutherland would like George and Dorothy to throw a cocktail party for Sir Horace that afternoon. Dorothy tells George that she gave Hazel the day off. Meanwhile, Hazel goes to the library to find out what she can about Sir Horace. George goes to pick up Sir Horace and his wife for the party. He finds Hazel about to see Sir Horace and sends her home. Hazel found out some compelling information on the conductor. Hazel tries talking to Sir Horace, but he's not interested. She then shows Lady Hobart the information she found. This will lead to Myra Waverly being reinstated and a few perks for Lady Hobart. Hedley Mattingly as Mr. Bankhead. John Zaremba as Mr. Hancock.
| 64 | 29 | "Hazel's Luck" | William D. Russell | John McGreevey | April 18, 1963 |
George complains about all the noise in the house. Harold is excited because Hazel won a local bowling tournament and they crowned her queen. She also won a watch. Now she'll be able to compete in the regional bowling tournament. Hazel says she had a lucky rabbit's foot with her. George tries to teach Harold that good luck charms do not work. Hazel hopes to sell the watch to Rosie so she can take the family to the tournament. Hazel destroys a chain letter in front of Harold at George's request. Rosie calls Hazel and says she can't buy the watch. Then more problems develop before and during the family's trip to watch Hazel compete in the tournament. But it seems that for every bad thing that happens, a good thing happens next. Hazel goes on to win the tournament. Hazel tells Dorothy that it was actually George that had all the bad luck after the letter was torn up. Eddie Quillan as Gas Station Attendant. Henry Hunter as Dr. Summerfield. Raymond Guth as Bowling Alley Manager.
| 65 | 30 | "Oh, My Aching Back" | William D. Russell | William Cowley | April 25, 1963 |
Hazel likes to say "I told you so" to George. Harold starts to think his father makes a lot of mistakes. In order to regain Harold's respect, George tries to show Harold that he knows more about baseball than Hazel does. Hazel warns George to not lift a pile of papers because he might hurt himself. George says he's in perfect shape and Hazel shouldn't worry. He then tries to hide from Hazel that he sprained his back lifting the papers. Dorothy has a talk with Hazel about making George look bad in front of Harold. Dorothy finds out about George's back. Hazel promises to Harold that she'll never say "I told you so" again. Dorothy sends Hazel grocery shopping so Dr. Summerfield can come to look at George. That way Hazel won't know about it. Hazel does see Dr. Summerfield's car outside. George explains to Hazel that Dr. Summerfield has come because Dorothy has a slight cold. Dorothy reluctantly goes along with George's lie. Dorothy suggests that George pretends he's catching a cold so he can lay in bed. Hazel tells Dorothy that she had a talk with Harold and the promise she made. But she goes back on her word when George reveals his back problem.
| 66 | 31 | "Maid of the Month" | William D. Russell | Robert Riley Crutcher | May 2, 1963 |
Hazel receives a telegram telling her she has been chosen "Maid of the Month" by a prestigious magazine. George finds it hard to believe and calls the magazine, but it is confirmed. Hazel is a little insulted that George had to check it out. What the Baxters and Hazel don't know is that Harvey Griffin pulled some strings to have Hazel picked. Harvey tells Mr. Anderson, the publisher, that he doesn't want Hazel to know he had anything to do with it. George apologizes to Hazel and he winds up having to redecorate her room and some of the house. Miss Sharpe, the reporter sent to interview Hazel, is resentful because she feels Hazel is not worthy. After the Photographers (Paul Smith and Jerry Hausner) take Hazel's picture, she gets them to fix her camera. While talking to Hazel, Miss Sharpe is very condescending and attempts to dismiss her abilities. Miss Sharpe reveals that Hazel was only picked because of Mr. Griffin. When Mr. Anderson finds out how Miss Sharpe treated Hazel and that she revealed Mr. Griffin, he fires her. Hazel goes to Mr. Anderson and asks him to hire Miss Sharpe back. Mr. Anderson's Secretary (Virginia Gregg) tells Miss Sharpe what Hazel is doing. Miss Sharpe is very touched by Hazel's gesture and she writes a nice story for the magazine.
| 67 | 32 | "So Long, Brown Eyes" | William D. Russell | Peggy Chantler Dick | May 9, 1963 |
Gus Jenkins (Patrick McVey), an old flame of Hazel's, writes her. The letter had been forwarded several times, but says she should write him if she would like to see him again. Hazel tells Dorothy how the two of them met. Hazel's not sure she should write him, but Dorothy says she'll never know how Gus feels if she doesn't. George tells Dorothy he doesn't think Hazel should hook up with a drifter, but Hazel does write him. Hazel keeps asking Barney if a letter came for her. A week later, Hazel gets a call from Gus. He will stop by to see her that evening. An excited Hazel gets ready for her date. Harold is afraid Hazel will stop loving him, but Dorothy explains that could never happen. On their evening out, Gus and Hazel go to a few of their old hangouts, but the places have all changed. At an amusement park, Gus asks Hazel to marry him. Meanwhile, Harold asks George where Hazel and Gus would live if they got married. Hazel explains to Gus that he would never be happy settling down. Gus knows she's right. He kisses Hazel goodbye and goes to the bus station. When she arrives home, Hazel assures Harold she'll be around for him.

=== Season 3 (1963–64) ===
| No. overall | No. in season | Title | Directed by | Written by | Original release date |
|---|---|---|---|---|---|
| 68 | 1 | "Potluck a la Mode" | William D. Russell | Jane Klove & Ted Sherdeman | September 19, 1963 |
George's partner Mr. Butterworth (Russell Collins) is trying to win Addison Sudley's (Philip Ober) account, but can't contact him. George tells him that he's invited Addison and his wife Lydia (Virginia Gregg) to dinner next Saturday night. Butterworth is surprised as Addison is known to be eccentric, demanding and stubborn. Butterworth tells George to make sure Hazel isn't around that night as she may insult the Sudleys somehow. At home, George offers Hazel a weeks paid vacation. This backfires on George when Hazel takes the check, but says it will take a while to make plans. Dorothy and George go out to dinner with the Butterworths. The Sudleys, who mistakenly have the wrong night, arrive at the Baxter house. Hazel tells them that George and Dorothy are out. As he's sent his Chauffeur away, Addison calls for a cab. From the kitchen, Hazel calls Mitch at the cab company and cancels the cab. Lydia drops one of her earrings and Smiley accidentally eats it. Hazel calls George at the restaurant and tells him about the Sudleys. Hazel, with her cooking, charms the important and finicky dinner guests. The Sudleys would like to hire Hazel away from the Baxters. George, Dorothy and the Butterworth's arrive. Hazel turns down the offer and Addison commends her on her loyalty. Despite the mix up, the Sudleys agree to come back on the correct evening for dinner. Helene Heigh as Mrs. Butterworth.
| 69 | 2 | "An Example for Hazel" | William D. Russell | William Cowley | September 26, 1963 |
George's second cousin Gracie's (Linda Watkins) father died. She is invited to move in with the Baxters until she can get on her feet again. George tells Hazel that Gracie is a shy, repressed, home bound spinster. George introduces Gracie to the family. Gracie admits to Hazel that her father was very domineering and she never really asserted herself. Gracie is surprised at the way Hazel talks to George as he is the head of the household. Hazel invites Gracie to go to an amusement park that night and she is thrilled. Not knowing this, Dorothy tells Gracie that George got tickets to a lecture that night. Hazel gets Gracie to admit she'd rather go to the amusement park. With Hazel's help, Gracie starts to open up. Hazel introduces Gracie to mailman Barney Hatfield (Robert B. Williams). Barney goes with Hazel and Gracie to the amusement park. Gracie has the time of her life breaking plates with a slingshot. Back at home, George can't think of a job Gracie could do and figures she might have to stay with them. Hazel changes Gracie into an outspoken bachelor girl and gets her a job as a maid. Herb Vigran as Mickey.
| 70 | 3 | "Dorothy Takes a Trip" | William D. Russell | William Cowley | October 3, 1963 |
Dorothy leaves town suddenly to help her Aunt Barbara care for a new baby, because she sprained her ankle. Rosie (Maudie Prickett) tells Hazel to watch George, because "When the Cats away.....". Hazel thinks George will be furious when he finds out about Dorothy. Instead of being upset, George invites several friends over for poker. Hazel thinks she'll be joining the game, but George tells his friends he doesn't want her to play. George's one friend, Jack Spencer, just had a big fight with his girlfriend, Dr. Phyllis Gordon (Bek Nelson). George thinks it would be a good idea to invite her to the game and maybe Jack and her can patch things up. Rosie comes by again to check on George, but Hazel says there's been no women around. Dorothy calls George to tell him she'll be gone a couple more days. When Hazel meets Phyllis, and not knowing that Phyllis is Jack's girlfriend, she begins to think Rosie was right. Hazel tries to keep George and Phyllis separated during the game, until she finds out the doctor is taken. Lauren Gilbert as Harry Noll.
| 71 | 4 | "You Ain't Fully Dressed Without a Smile" | William D. Russell | Robert Riley Crutcher | October 10, 1963 |
Dorothy is still out of town helping her Aunt Barbara who has a sprained ankle. Something Hazel says causes George to drop a glass figurine of Dorothy's. George's mother (Louise Lorimer) is visiting. Hazel tells her she'll take the figurine to Miss Minnie Smith (Ellen Corby), an old woman who repairs antiques. Harold tells Hazel that Miss Minnie's store is locked up because she doesn't some men getting in. When Miss Minnie doesn't answer her phone, Hazel goes to the store. Miss Minnie tells Hazel that the men are trying to serve her some legal papers. Miss Minnie bought the store from a Mr. Bailey. She made her last payment, but Bailey died before he could give her ownership papers. Now Bailey's family wants to take over the store. Hazel says that George will help her for free. Because he wouldn't except any money, Miss Minnie gives George a broken down roll-top desk as payment for his legal help. He is annoyed at first, even though Miss Minnie says that it may be connected with Abraham Lincoln. Miss Minnie brings Mr. Wilcox (Nelson Olmsted), from a Washington Historical Society, to George's office. He would like to see the desk. Meanwhile, Charlie Carlotti (Mario Siletti), the antique dealer, reluctantly buys the desk from Hazel. George now has to buy the desk back at a higher price. Mr. Wilcox looks at the desk and says it was definitely not Lincoln's desk. Now George and Hazel try to get Charlie to take the desk back again. Eddie Quillan as a Mover.
| 72 | 5 | "Cheerin' Up Mr. B" | William D. Russell | William Cowley | October 17, 1963 |
Dorothy is still out of town taking care of Aunt Barbara and her kids. Hazel is trying her best to cheer up a lonely George. Rosie asks Hazel to go see a movie, but Hazel wants to stay around the house for George. George has a free weekend and Hazel suggests a few things to do, but George is not interested. Thinking George would like to bury himself in his work, Hazel talks friends of his into coming over with legal problems. She even gets Rosie involved. George gets furious when he finds out Hazels scheme. He yells at her in front of Harry and Mr. Griffin and causes her to cry. George explains to Harold that he won't apologize to Hazel because she was wrong. George goes on to say that he's sure it will all blow over. George tells Harold to laugh at any joke Hazel tells them. But Hazel remains very cold and distant to George. George eventually apologizes and Hazel apologizes for interfering.
| 73 | 6 | "Piccolo Mondo" | William D. Russell | John McGreevey | October 24, 1963 |
Hazel has been out with the flu. During that time, the family ate at restaurants. Without home cooked meals, Hazel figures George may have lost some weight. George tells Hazel about the great Italian dishes he had and the weight he's gained. Hazel decides to make some real Italian dishes. She gets some recipes from Chef Luigi Pancini at George's favorite Italian restaurant. But they are all in Italian. Rosie suggests Hazel learn Italian in night school. At night school Hazel meets Enzo Martelli (Gregory Morton). He offers to help her with Italian if she helps him with English. Rosie gets upset because she thought Enzo was interested in her. George has a new client named Carlo Fiore (Albert Carrier) who is from Italy and speaks no English. George would like to have Carlo over for dinner and Carlo's wife could act as interpreter. Enzo invites Hazel to the opera. George invites Carlo over for dinner the same night that Hazel was to go to the opera. When Carlo arrives, his wife is not with him as she is sick. Enzo comes by to pick up Hazel and saves the day by translating for Carlo. To pay him back, George buys tickets to another opera for Enzo and Hazel and dinner afterwards. Barbara Shelley as Anna Forti.
| 74 | 7 | "Hazel Scores a Touchdown" | William D. Russell | Robert Riley Crutcher | October 31, 1963 |
Coach Murphy (Alan Hale, Jr.), of the local football team the Bulldogs, asks his quarterback Gus (Jon Arnett) who told him to change a play. Murphy knows it was one of the two owners, Mr. Wheeler (Vinton Hayworth) and Mr. Dempsey (Willis Bouchey). They keep trying to run the team instead of him. Hazel comes to visit. Murphy tells Hazel there's a rumor that Mr. Johnson (John Archer), the president of the league, wants to buy the team and disband it. And worse, George is handling the case. Because Wheeler and Dempsey don't speak to each other, George decides to get off the case. George tells Hazel the team may still in jeopardy because the owners will try to get another lawyer. George has no idea what the men are fighting about. Hazel wants George to help her bring the two owners together, but he isn't interested. Hazel suggests that George throw a party for the team. Wheeler and Dempsey do show up, but still won't talk to each other. Dempsey confesses to Hazel that he doesn't remember what started the feud. Apparently Wheeler doesn't remember either. Hazel succeeds in bringing the two together, but they still want to sell the team. Because Coach Murphy was able to run the team the way he wanted, they win their next game. Wheeler and Dempsey now want to keep the team.
| 75 | 8 | "George's 32nd Cousin" | William D. Russell | Louella MacFarlane | November 7, 1963 |
Hazel has Ben Cook (John Brandon) and his brother Joe, who are painters, over for an estimate. George comes home and says he has no intention of painting the house. George's uninvited, extremely annoying and selfish country cousin Sharlene (Diane Ladd) drops by. They are surprised when they learn she intends to move in. The family quickly becomes tired with Sharlene. After George asks, Sharlene says she'll only be staying until she gets a job and she wants to be a model. Plus, she's hoping George will pay for the modeling school. But George tells her he doesn't have the money for that. Hazel comes up with a plan to make things uncomfortable for Sharlene. First they'll have the house painted by Ben and Joe. Then they have Harold pretend he has the measles. Hazel has Ben and Joe flatter Sharlene and tell her she should go to New York and model. Sharlene says she'd go to New York if she had the money. She asks to borrow it from Hazel, but Hazel won't do it. Hazel then tells Sharlene that if she stays, she could help with the house work to pay for her keep. When Harold asks her to take care of him while he's sick, Sharlene grabs her suitcase and goes running out of the house.
| 76 | 9 | "The Baby Came C.O.D." | William D. Russell | Robert Riley Crutcher | November 14, 1963 |
Hazel tells Dorothy that her friends David (James Stacy) and Maria Merrick are expecting a baby any day now. David is studying law and tries to sell insurance to pay the bills. George says he has an invitation from Dean Evans to speak at a law school. But there is another man, Harry Belmont, also in the running. Dean Evans must have a brief summary of what George will say by tomorrow morning. Later, David comes to drop off some papers to Hazel and he is worn out. He tells Hazel he'll have to drop out of school. Hazel gets George to try and talk David out of quitting school. George finds a way for David to pay for school by selling a large insurance policy to one of Mr. Griffin's new companies. David learns that Maria is about to deliver the baby and goes to the hospital. George then pays for a better hospital room for Maria. Other problems arise and George is running out of time to prepare his brief. Maria winds up having a baby girl. Days later David and Maria come by with the baby. Dean Evans then stops by and tells George he's been selected to give the lecture despite not finishing the brief. Apparently Hazel told Dean Evans what George did for David. Kathleen O'Malley as a Nurse.
| 77 | 10 | "All Hazel Is Divided Into Three Parts" | William D. Russell | Teleplay by Peggy Chantler Dick; Story by Peggy Chantler Dick & Frank Granville | November 21, 1963 |
The Sunshine Girls become foster mothers to Emilia, a young orphan in Italy. Deirdre (Cathy Lewis) and Harry are going to Europe and Hazel wonders if they could check in on the little girl. Deirdre comes up with a reason why that wouldn't be possible. Deirdre learns that Harriet Johnson (Norma Varden) knows the famous artist Gabe Fairchild (Douglas Dick). Harriet says that Gabe would like to meet George, Dorothy and especially Hazel. Now instead of the trip, Deirdre would like to commission Gabe to do a portrait of herself. Gabe turns Deirdre down as he will be going to Europe for 6 months. Deirdre then says she will be going to Europe and maybe she could meet Gabe there. Gabe isn't sure where he'll be at any one time. Gabe agrees to look up Emilia. Later, Hazel tells Harriet and Herbert (Donald Foster) that she got a letter from Gabe. She also got a letter from Emilia. Hazel tells them that the Sunshine Girls want to hold a fund-raiser auction to raise money to support the child. Gabe sends Hazel one of his paintings which she donates to the auction. At the auction, Dorothy tells George that the woman in Gabe's painting looks a little like Hazel. Deirdre has to have it and forces Harry to buy it. In her house, Deirdre tells Harry that the woman in the painting resembles her. George DeNormand as Waiter. Ethelreda Leopold as Fundraiser Guest.
| 78 | 11 | "Hazel and the Vanishing Hero" | William D. Russell | Louella MacFarlane | November 28, 1963 |
George is helping Dorothy paint a clients cabinet. Zachary King (Leif Erickson), a famous retired Olympic boxing champ, and his wife Gloria (Gloria Henry) will be traveling through town and call the Baxters. Because of Hazel he is cut off. He's seeking a job as athletic director for Mr. Griffin's firm. George grew up with Zach, but hasn't seen him since high school. George tells the family how he beat Zach in a fight when they were kids. Mr. Griffin comes by and Hazel reminds him about Thanksgiving dinner. George doesn't want Harvey to know about Zach's call, but Hazel mentions it. Harvey tells George it would be great if they could get Zach for the athletic job, but George isn't sure Zach would be interested. Zach calls again and George invites them over to stay with them while in town. Zach and Gloria arrive. When Zachary says that George could never beat him in a fight, Harold is ashamed of his father. Harold thinks George lied to him and he now wants to run away from home. Dorothy tells Harold that if he's ashamed of his father, she's ashamed of him. With some old photos she found, Hazel helps to restore Harold's faith in George's boyhood heroism by proving George's story was true. And George gets Zach the job.
| 79 | 12 | "Call Me Harve" | William D. Russell | Robert Riley Crutcher | December 5, 1963 |
Rosie and her niece Laurie (Ann Jillian) visit Hazel. Laurie has a lamb with her. She wants to attend a local art school. Laurie lives on a farm and was raising sheep to sell to pay for the school. Dorothy says that the head of the art school is Miss Wilson, a friend of hers. Dorothy will drive Laurie there. Rosie tells Hazel that the sheep will have problems keeping warm due to being sheared too soon. Mr. Griffin is trying to call George with some important information. But Hazel is tying up the line calling people trying to find sweaters for the sheep. Mr. Griffin comes by upset because the phone has been busy for the last four hours. George and Mr. Griffin have a tiff and George resigns as Harvey's lawyer. Harvey tries to talk George out of it, but George kicks him out of the house. George goes through the living room and sees Laurie's lamb. When he goes back it's not there and George thinks he's seeing things. A remorseful Mr. Griffin brings over gifts for the family, but George isn't interested. Mr. Griffin agrees to buy sweaters for the sheep if Hazel can get George to make up with him. Harvey and Hazel follow George to the golf course, but George still won't talk to them. Back at home, George meets Laurie. Dorothy says that Laurie was accepted to the art school. Hazel fakes an accident and pretends to be unconscious. This brings Harvey and George back together.
| 80 | 13 | "The Retiring Milkman" | William D. Russell | Keith Fowler & Phil Leslie | December 12, 1963 |
Hazel makes breakfast for her friend Claude Waters (Sterling Holloway), the local milkman. Claude mentions that a Harvey Griffin bought the local dairy. Hazel tells Claude she knows Mr. Griffin. She recommends that Claude give extra good service for a while. Harvey puts George in charge of the dairy to make sure it's running smoothly. George reluctantly agrees. George tells Hazel that he'll have to fire Claude because he is always late with deliveries. Hazel and Dorothy talk George into giving Claude a week to improve. Hazel and the Sunshine Girls make plans to help Claude keep his job. Despite their best efforts, Griffin wants Claude fired. Hazel has a talk with Harvey. As a good will gesture, Mr. Griffin agrees to let Claude retire with a pension. When so many people from his route come out to wish him well at a retirement party, he decides not to retire. Queenie Leonard as Peggy. Myrna Dell as Receptionist. Barbara Luddy as Ruth.
| 81 | 14 | "Hazel's Nest Egg" | William D. Russell | Robert Riley Crutcher | December 19, 1963 |
Hazel learns from scoutmaster Mr. Merrick (Paul Smith) that Harold won't be a Tenderfoot scout as he hasn't passed his test yet. Back at the house, Mr. Griffin tells George and Dorothy that he always wanted to be a scout. He also mentions his difficult childhood, which George has heard about countless times. Hazel comes home and tells them about Harold not becoming a scout. Harold tells the family that he doesn't want to take the test, even though he can easily pass. His friend Leslie (Charles Herbert) can't pass and Harold doesn't want to be a scout without him. Meanwhile, Dorothy gives Hazel the shares of stock that Harvey left for her. The Baxter's pitch in to help Leslie. Leslie still has a hard time with the things he needs to learn. Something George says gives Hazel an idea. As an incentive for the boys, Hazel gives each a share of stock in Mr. Griffin's company. The next morning George calls Mr. Merrick and asks him to come over and give the boys their test. But now all the boys can think of is getting rich with the stock. George tries to explain to the boys that stocks can also go down. Things get a little awkward when Mr. Griffin comes by and overhears George talking about his stock going down. Hazel gives Leslie a pep-talk and he passes the test.
| 82 | 15 | "Hazel and the Halfback" | William D. Russell | William Cowley | December 26, 1963 |
Dorothy is out of town. George is bringing a guest home for dinner so he asks Deirdre to help out. Hazel comes home from coaching Harold's football team. New York Giants' Frank Gifford is in town to possibly invest in a local bowling alley and George is helping him. Miss Sterling (Linda Marshall), George's secretary, is flirting a little with Frank. Harry comes in the office and asks Frank for his autograph. George brings Frank home with him. Hazel is thrilled to meet Frank. She mentions that she coaches a football team. Hazel would like to go over some football plays with Frank. George says that Frank is here on business and she shouldn't interrupt. When she hears Frank is interested in a bowling alley, Hazel recommends Brewster's (Bill Zuckert) bowling center. George has another place in mind. Hazel keeps mentioning Brewster's place. Plus, she shows Frank diagrams of football plays she has devised. Hazel manages to bring Frank and George to Brewster's where she is giving a trick shot exhibition. Hazel and Frank sign some autographs. George goes over Brester's books and unfortunately can't recommend his place as an investment.
| 83 | 16 | "Hazel and the Model T" | William D. Russell | Teleplay by Helen Spencer; Story by Frank Granville & Helen Spencer | January 2, 1964 |
Mr. Griffin wants to buy some land from Mr. Joshua Egan (Maurice Manson), but Egan will barely listen to any offer that George makes. Harvey needs that land to expand his factory or he'll lose government business. Hazel was hoping to borrow George's car to go to a supermarket grand opening. George needs the car because Harvey insisted that George go see Egan again. Hazel asks George to buy her a car, but he refuses. The Johnsons offer Hazel the use of their 1920 Model T. Hazel wants to buy it and Herbert will take no more than $25. George comes home and sees the car parked in his space and is not happy. George couldn't reach Egan. He knows that if he could just get Egan alone, he could make the deal. George will get a chance to speak with Egan during an upcoming golf game with mutual friend, Fred Blangsted (William Bakewell). Fred and Egan come by to pick up George. It seems Egan is an antique car buff and when he sees Hazel's car, he insists on taking a drive in it. George is upset because now Egan won't go golfing. Egan wants to buy Hazel's car. Hazel works it so that George makes the deal for the car and Griffin also gets to buy the land from Egan.
| 84 | 17 | "Hot Potato a la Hazel" | William D. Russell | Robert Riley Crutcher | January 9, 1964 |
Miss Elsie (Alice Pearce), who repairs broken dishware, yearns for antique dealer Charlie Carlotti. While Charlie isn't around, Elsie brakes a tea pot in his store so she'll have another reason to see him. Harold sees what Elsie did from outside the store. Hazel winds up blaming Harold for the broken pot and buys it from Charlie. Elsie admits to Hazel she what she did and why. Hazel tries her hand at matchmaking between Charlie and Elsie. She tells Dorothy that she invited both of them over for dinner. Charlie doesn't know Elsie will be there. Elsie arrives and Hazel doesn't like the dress she has on. Hazel takes her to a dress shop. Charlie arrives and waits in the kitchen. Because of something Dorothy tells George, George congratulates Charlie on his upcoming marriage to Elsie. Charlie goes running out of the house. At the dress shop, Edna (Hope Summers) and Julia (Alice Frost), the owners, help Elsie find a nicer dress. Hazel and Elsie accidentally wind up with Julia's purse containing the week's receipts from the shop. Meanwhile George is entertaining bank owner Mr. Drake (Howard Wendell). Detective Lewis (Dick Wilson), two other police and Edna and Julia arrive. Mr. Drake gets a little startled when Lewis accuses Hazel of robbery. The way the purse was innocently taken is revealed. Hazel serves everyone some pie. Charlie and Dorothy arrive. Charlie runs away again when marriage is mentioned.
| 85 | 18 | "Scheherazade and Her Frying Pan: Part 1" | William D. Russell | Louella MacFarlane | January 16, 1964 |
George's cousin Gracie has a job as a maid for Mr. Bixby (Roland Winters) in a home in Malibu. Hazel would like to vacation out there with Gracie. Hazel has sent her several letters, but hasn't heard back from her. Gracie finally calls Hazel. Gracie says she never got any letters and that's why she called. Bixby is listening in on the call and has Freddie Hobart cut Gracie off. It turns out that Bixby is a big-time gangster. There is supposed to be a big meeting at his house this weekend. Bixby lets Gracie call Hazel back. Bixby will give Gracie time off after the meeting. He'll pay for a week in Las Vegas for Gracie and Hazel. Hazel decides she'll pay Bixby back by helping Gracie with the meeting. Hazel drives out to Malibu. It's the day of the meeting and anyone going to Bixby's house is being watched. When Hazel is not allowed passed the gate, she sneaks into the house. Bixby is stunned when Hazel hands out the hors d'oeuvres. Hazel recognizes two of the men as Handsome Harry and Willie Gant (Edgar Stehli), mobsters. Her and Gracie try to leave, but are stopped by a Guard (John Cliff). Emile Meyer as Wheels. Baynes Barron as Detective #1. Roy Glenn as Detective #2. Rusty Lane as Fisherman #1.
| 86 | 19 | "Scheherazade and Her Frying Pan: Part 2" | William D. Russell | Louella MacFarlane | January 23, 1964 |
George and Dorothy are questioned by Federal Agent Willoughby (Bert Remsen) about why Hazel is in California. Concerned that Hazel and Gracie may be in trouble, Dorothy insists George fly out to them to make sure they're OK. Meanwhile, the gangsters hold a vote to see whether they will sell out to another mob. Afraid the men may do something to her and Gracie when the vote is over, Hazel finds a way for the men to have to vote again the next morning. Hazel overhears something that makes her even more concerned about her safety. She almost gets caught trying to get some tranquilizers out of Bixby's desk. The next morning, George arrives in town. With the tranquilizers, Hazel and Gracie concoct a surprising epicurean touch that will aid in their escape. George is stopped by the police before he can get to Bixby's house. After checking him out, they let George go. The police arrive at the house and arrest everyone. Hazel also manages to capture Freddie Hobart, who turns out to be an undercover agent. George arrives at the house. George says he'll take Hazel and Gracie to Las Vegas for a couple days.
| 87 | 20 | "The Fashion Show" | William D. Russell | Keith Fowler & Phil Leslie | January 30, 1964 |
Dorothy is set to model in Deirdre's fashion show. Meanwhile, George is meeting with Mr. Jim Jeffries (Douglas Fowley), a client from out of town. Jim doesn't want his wife Emma (Florence Sundstrom) to know about the fashion show. She always buys lots of stuff and then is always disappointed with how the clothes look on her. That night the Jeffries come over for dinner. Before George can warn her, Hazel lets it slip about the show. The next day Mr. Montague (Reginald Gardiner), the stylist, is preparing for the show. Edith (Elizabeth Harrower), his assistant, is helping him. Deirdre welcomes Marietta Horn (Anna Karen), who writes the local society column. After spraining her ankle, Dorothy is unable to model. Hazel has to go to the show to inform Mr. Montague. The show starts. Hazel arrives and then is recruited to model instead. Deirdre is furious and thinks Hazel will ruin her show. However, Hazel steals the spotlight from the town's prettiest girls. Emma buys the dresses that Hazel modeled. Mr. Montague says it was the most successful show he's ever had and thanks Hazel. Mr. Montague will use a model like Hazel from now on in all his shows. Marietta Horn was very impressed with the show and Hazel graciously gives all the credit to Deirdre. George DeNormand as Show Spectator.
| 88 | 21 | "George's Ordeal" | William D. Russell | Teleplay by Peggy Chantler Dick; Story by Peggy Chantler Dick & Frank Granville | February 6, 1964 |
Dr. Summerfield (Henry Hunter) tells George to lose 10 pounds, which is what Hazel predicted. The Doctor calls Hazel and tells her to put George on a low-calorie diet. Hazel and Dorothy figure out how many calories George has had already that day. Rosie comes by and shows Hazel a new mink hat. Hazel bets Rosie the hat that she can get George to lose 10 pounds. Every time George tries to sneak some food, Hazel is there. Mr. Griffin comes by and tells Harold he's moving into the guest room for two weeks. Harold says that Hazel and George are jogging around the block. Because he needs to talk to George, Harvey jogs along with them. Dorothy wonders if they should postpone George's diet until Harvey leaves. George tries to sneak a meal at Mr. Griffin's house, but Hazel has already spoken to Harvey's cook, Ruth (Barbara Luddy). Harvey says that he wants to lose 10 pounds as well. George loses the weight and Hazel wins the mink hat.
| 89 | 22 | "The Reluctant Witness" | William D. Russell | Robert Riley Crutcher | February 13, 1964 |
Dorothy is expecting a visit from Mrs. Osborn, a prospective client. Miss Ramsey (Mabel Albertson), a tax appraiser, comes to the Baxter house to appraise the furnishings. Thinking that Miss Ramsey is Mrs. Osborn, Hazel starts bragging and exaggerating about all the expensive items in the house. Hazel changes her tune when she learns who the woman really is. Mrs. Osborn comes by with her poodle and Smiley starts chasing it. A month later Dorothy tells George and Hazel that she's resigning from the Interior Decorators association. Mrs. Osborn insisted that a drawing room of hers be completely done in red and Dorothy tried to talk her out of it. If other people thought it was Dorothy's idea, she'd be laughed out of the business. Lawyer Harry Belmont (John Archer) informs Dorothy she is being sued by Mrs. Osborn. Mrs. Osborn claims Dorothy decorated the room in a certain style which she didn't want. Miss Ramsey comes by to reappraise the house. It turns out Miss Ramsey overheard Mrs. Osborn insist that she did want that style. Miss Ramsey is reluctant to get involved. After an unforeseen delay and mix-up, Miss Ramsey agrees to talk to Harry. Then there's a quick trip to the dentist when Miss Ramsey breaks a tooth. Miss Ramsey is finally able to tell Harry what she heard and Dorothy is cleared. Song: Shirley sings "Dixie".
| 90 | 23 | "Democracy at Work" | William D. Russell | Keith Fowler & Phil Leslie | February 20, 1964 |
Hazel tells Monte the bread man that it's the time of year when she asks George for a raise. She would like some chocolate donuts to bribe him. Hazel starts hinting for the raise, but George doesn't want to give her one. And this time Dorothy agrees to back George on his decision. At the office, Mr. Burgess (Francis DeSales) is talking to George about the meeting for a new city hall. He would like George to speak at the meeting. At home George tries to teach Harold about democracy. They vote on several household things, and George then calls for a vote on Hazel's raise. When the vote goes against her, she later comes up with a way to get another vote. Hazel enlists Rosie to help convince Dorothy to vote yes. She stages it so Dorothy overhears their discussion. Hazel says she can't go to the dance with Barney because she can't afford a new dress. Hazel asks Rosie to go with Barney. Hazel doesn't know that George overhears this as well. George tells Dorothy that he knows for a fact that Barney is out of town. Trying to deceive Dorothy is something that Hazel has never done before. If she's willing to go that far, the raise must be important so Dorothy changes her vote to a yes. But, Hazel turns down the raise. She explains that George is going to have to spend a lot of money because she found termites in the basement.
| 91 | 24 | "The Countess" | William D. Russell | Jane Klove & Ted Sherdeman | February 27, 1964 |
Hazel receives a letter from some lawyers which suggests the possibility that she may be the Countess of Brentwood and an Heiress. Hazel mentions it to Rosie and makes her promise to not tell anyone else. But the news doesn't remain a secret for long. Meanwhile, Harold wants to get Smiley entered in a local dog show who's chairwoman is George's sister Deirdre. Deirdre says that Smiley isn't a pedigree dog, so he can't enter. Hearing about Hazel's possible title, Deirdre is very skeptical. At the office, Mr. Butterworth (Russell Collins), George's law partner, comes in to congratulate George. George thinks it's about an important deal he finalized, but Butterworth says it's about Hazel's inheritance. Deirdre learns that Mrs. Butterworth is having a dinner party for Hazel in three weeks. George thinks someone is just scamming Hazel. Deirdre comes by and tells George and Dorothy that she's decided to have a reception for Hazel. Deirdre tells Hazel about it and Hazel brings up the dog show. Harold is charging local children a nickel to see Hazel the Countess. Hazel makes Harold give the money back. Harold wanted to buy Hazel a going away present, but she says she isn't leaving. Reginald Archibald (Lester Matthews), the British barrister, stops by the Baxter's. Much to Hazel's relief, she finds out that she isn't really a Countess. As a favor to Hazel, Deirdre got Smiley into the dog show. Hazel tells her the news that she isn't a Countess. Deirdre now has to cancel all her big party plans for Hazel.
| 92 | 25 | "Hazel's Midas Touch" | William D. Russell | Robert Riley Crutcher | March 5, 1964 |
George flew back from New York and sat next to millionaire William Cady (Leo G. Carroll). Cady gives George a copy of his autobiography that he has just written. Hazel comes to pick up George at the airport and he tells her about Cady. Hazel tells Dorothy about George meeting Cady. At his hotel room, Cady tells his assistant Mr. Barry (Max Showalter) that he regrets writing that autobiography. The publisher suggested that Cady claim, untruthfully, that a mystery woman helped him with his career. Now countless women show up at his hotel believing they are the one he wrote about. Hazel thinks Rosie is the woman and takes her to the hotel. At his office, George's secretary (Molly Dodd) tells him that Henry Logan, the Chairman of the Art Museum Board, is here to see him. Henry hopes that George can get Cady to donate some of his artwork to the museum. At his hotel room, Cady is rude to all the women who showed up and Hazel tells him off. George, not knowing any of this, invites Cady to his house for dinner. George mentions donating some artwork to Cady. Henry arrives at the house to see Cady. When Cady sees Hazel, they have a fight and he storms out of the house. George learns that Hazel was the one that told Cady off. Later, because of something Hazel said, Cady donates his paintings. Joe Ploski as Commuter.
| 93 | 26 | "Everybody's a Comedian" | William D. Russell | Keith Fowler & Phil Leslie | March 12, 1964 |
Hazel is having a hard time reading the phone book and George suggests she needs glasses. George mentions to Dorothy that Mr. Martindale owns a product that Mr. Griffin wants to buy. George worries that Harvey will ruin the deal. Hazel makes a bet with George about her eyesight. Harvey flies out to talk to Martindale, but Martindale does not want to deal with him. The next day Hazel's nearsightedness in reading a telegram causes George to arrive way too early at the airport to pick up Mr. Griffin. Thanks to Dorothy, Hazel realizes her mistake. After talking to Secretary Helen (Molly Dodd), Hazel decides to try and track down George. While looking for George, Hazel gets a parking ticket. Hazel continues to go on a wild goose chase all over town trying to find George to tell him of her mistake. She also gets stuck in a phone booth. At the airport George runs into Mr. Martindale. George closes the deal. Hazel finally finds George at the airport. She tries to take credit for George being able to make the deal. Harvey talks George into giving Hazel a bonus and she agrees to buy glasses with it. Jester Hairston as Marvin. Stanley Farrar as Mr. Dunn.
| 94 | 27 | "All Mixed Up" | William D. Russell | Frank Crow | March 19, 1964 |
Mr. Ray Buckley (Alan Hewitt) is at the Baxter house for dinner. Because of her charm and she's a great cook, Buckley would like Hazel to do commercials for his "Aunt Nora's Cake Mixes". Hazel learns that she'd have to leave the Baxters, so she declines the offer. But when Buckley says he'll only use her on her days off, she reluctantly agrees. Filming the first commercial goes so well that Buckley starts implying that he will need more of her time. Mr. Griffin invites himself over for dinner. Because of phone calls and deliveries for Hazel, she ruins dinner. Soon Hazel gets called in on other days and her filming schedule starts to interfere with her domestic job. George and Dorothy are getting tired of it. George calls Buckley and reminds him that they agreed he could have Hazel just one day a week. Hazel wants to stop, but she remembers that she is tied to a 3 year contract. Harvey tells George that he should find a way to brake the contract, but George can't. Mr. Griffin buys the company from Buckley, so Hazel is released from the contract.
| 95 | 28 | "Arrivederci, Mr. B." | William D. Russell | Robert Riley Crutcher | March 26, 1964 |
Hazel finds a Christmas present for George that she hid five years ago. It's a sweater that is now full of moth holes. Later, Hazel leaves Harold outside of Charlie's Antique shop while she goes to the yarn store. Charlie comes by and Harold accidentally knocks a bunch of baby food cans out of Charlie's hands. Hazel learns that Charlie is hiding his niece Carla (Luciana Paluzzi) and her baby. Meanwhile, Harry Noll tells George that Mrs. Hampton (Kathryn Givney) is here and Harry needs George's help with her. It turns out that Mrs. Hampton is Great Grandmother to Carla's baby. Mrs. Hampton believes Carla is unfit because she speaks very little English. Mrs. Hampton is an important client of George's firm and she insists he find the baby. Hazel brings Charlie, Clara and the baby to Dorothy. Hazel promised Carla that George will help her. George and Harry come home. When they learn the baby is there, Harry calls Mrs. Hampton. Charlie is mad at Hazel and feels betrayed. After hearing the whole story from Dorothy and Hazel, George stands up to Mrs. Hampton and tells her she has no legal grounds to get the baby. For the sake of the baby, Mrs. Hampton agrees to learn Italian and Carla will learn English. Note: This is the last episode with Charlie the antiques dealer. Mario Siletti passed away 3 weeks after this episode aired.
| 96 | 29 | "Such a Nice Little Man" | William D. Russell | Keith Fowler & Phil Leslie | April 2, 1964 |
Hazel meets a nice man (Byron Foulger) in the park. Later the man is stop by a Policeman (Owen Bush) who warns him to stay out of trouble. Because Hazel mentioned where she worked, the man shows up at the Baxter house. He introduces himself as Willie Gaffney and asks if Hazel had any odd jobs he could do. Hazel learns that Willie is quite the vagabond. Hazel tells Willie that the Johnsons could use some help. George is sure he knows Willie from somewhere and that he had been in trouble. The Johnson's do hire Willie to do handy work around the house and they are quite pleased with his work. George tells Hazel that Willie was in court a week ago for having stolen property in his possession. He had a sob story and was let go with a warning. Willie does admit to Hazel, George and the Johnsons that he was arrested and has an explanation. Willie suddenly leaves without a word. A special antique bowl of the Johnsons also disappears and they believe Willie may have just misplaced it. Everyone else wonders if Willie is a thief. Hazel goes to see Homer Dandridge (Jerry Hausner) at the store where the Johnsons got the bowl. She buys a exact replacement bowl and will claim she found where Willie misplaced it. Herbert and Harriet each separately buy a bowl for the same reason. Willie returns with the bowl. Turns out he broke the original and was working in a garage to get money to replace it.
| 97 | 30 | "Campaign Manager" | William D. Russell | Jane Klove & Ted Sherdeman | April 9, 1964 |
George has Addison Sudley (Philip Ober) over for dinner. Hazel is upset because city councilman Perry Preston (James Flavin) re-zoned the city park to make way for factories. Addison says he supports Preston. The next morning, George tells Hazel that she shouldn't talk politics with guests. Because of something else George says, Hazel starts a petition signing against the factories. Dorothy and the Sunshine Girls help. Dorothy and Hazel tell George they want to hold a rally at city hall, but George tells them they will need a permit. Hazel goes to see Addison and while there, she meets Preston. Hazel shows Preston all the signatures she got and he belittles her. Addison now wants to sign the petition. Hazel, Dorothy and Addison convince George to run against Preston. During a TV debate, George and Hazel bring up some compelling arguments to keep the park as it is. Preston agrees and changes his mind about the re-zoning. George withdraws from the race. Harold Gould as TV announcer. Sam Edwards as Make-up Man. Maidie Norman as Lady.
| 98 | 31 | "Let's Get Away from It All" | William D. Russell | Dorothy Cooper Foote | April 16, 1964 |
George has been on the phone all day and he would like to relax. Hazel and the Baxters will go to a restaurant for a quiet dinner. On a recommendation from Charlie, Hazel suggests Antonio's Little Italy. When they get there, the place is empty. Hazel learns that Tony (Jamie Farr) the owner's wife is about to have a baby. Tony called for a doctor, but because the restaurant is so far out of town it will take a while. Hazel and the Baxters volunteer to become the help. A lot of customers arrive. Frank Brown (Bill Zuckert) complains to his wife Lois (Betty Lou Gerson) about how poor the service is. Elwood Baldwin (Stuart Nisbet) and his wife Ethel arrive. Because it's so crowded, Hazel asks the Browns if the Baldwins could sit with them. The two couples know each other and haven't spoken in years. By the end of the evening they are friends again. Mr. Griffin happens to come by and is surprised to see the Baxters and Hazel helping out. Hazel informs all the customers what's going on and to please be patient. Turns out one of the customers is a doctor (Arthur Peterson). Harvey offers to help out also. Tony's wife winds up having twins. Note: The then-newly-introduced Ford Mustang made one of its first TV appearances in this episode as the Baxters' new car.
| 99 | 32 | "Maid for a Day" | William D. Russell | Dorothy Cooper Foote | April 23, 1964 |
When Deirdre finds out the local theater is putting on a play for charity, she decides to try out for the lead. Hazel is familiar with the play because she overheard Max Denton (Harvey Korman), the director of the play, talking about it. Hazel tells Deirdre to try out for the part of Susie the maid, as it's an important part. Deirdre goes to see Max and gets a chance at the part. Just then Emily Dearborne comes by hoping to get the part of Susie. Max talks Emily into another role. Max suggests that Hazel help coach Deirdre for her part. Meanwhile, George and Dorothy run into wealthy E.J. McClaine (Hugh Sanders), an oil tycoon, at a restaurant. Hoping to get his account for George, Dorothy invites McClaine to dinner that evening. George winds up having to pick up McClaine's check. At the house, Deirdre is exhausted from rehearsing the maid part with Hazel and lays down on the couch. McClaine arrives earlier than expected. He insults Deirdre, thinking she is an incompetent maid. Max Denton shows up just in time to see Deirdre throw a pie at McClaine's face. Both Deirdre and McClaine get parts in the play.

=== Season 4 (1964–65) ===
| No. overall | No. in season | Title | Directed by | Written by | Original release date |
|---|---|---|---|---|---|
| 100 | 1 | "Never Trouble Trouble" | William D. Russell | Robert Riley Crutcher | September 17, 1964 |
George's cousin Fred visits again, asking for money. George refuses to give it to him and suggests he get a job. George drives his freeloading cousin out of the house. But after Fred is gone, George does feel bad that he was that mean. Down the block Fred runs into Harold. Fred goes to a firm run by a Mr. Wheeler (Harold Gould) and winds up getting a job. That evening Hazel is woken up by the back door rattling and sees it's not locked. She discovers that her government bonds and Dorothy's fur coat, among many other things, are missing. George is about to call the police. He sees a note by the phone warning him not to. They reluctantly suspect Fred. Hazel says she already called the police. The Police Lieutenant (Robert Shayne) comes by to speak to the family. Harold mentions the conversation he had with Fred and it further implicates Fred. Fred comes back and announces to Hazel that he has a new job. The police call the house and inform the Lieutenant that the real crook was caught. The family feels bad that they suspected Fred and want to do something nice for him.
| 101 | 2 | "Luncheon with the Governor" | William D. Russell | Keith Fowler & Phil Leslie | September 24, 1964 |
Hazel learns from Dorothy that Governor Willard McGuire and his wife (Virginia Christine) will be coming to town. The Mayor is away and would like George to take Willard and his wife to the hotel. Hazel is a big fan of the Governor and would love to meet him. Hazel suggests bringing the Governor to the house for lunch. George likes the idea, but he wants Hazel to promise not to monopolize the conversation. Hazel tells Rosie (Maudie Prickett) about the Governor. Hazel meets Jim (William Cort) and Marge Logan, young married college students with a baby. They are trying to find affordable housing for married couples near the campus. Hazel wants to mention this to the Governor, but George insists she doesn't. The Governor and guests arrive at the house. While the luncheon is going on, they have to deal with student protesters outside the house demanding better housing for college students. Tom Jennings (Douglas Dick), the Governor's assistant, tells him to just ignore the crowd. Hazel gets Dorothy's permission to feed the protesters. With Mrs. McGuire's help, Hazel finds a way for the Governor to learn what the students want. The Governor, once he understands their dilemma, agrees to help. Larry Thor as TV Reporter.
| 102 | 3 | "Ain't That a Knee Slapper?" | William D. Russell | William Cowley | October 1, 1964 |
George tries to write a business contract for Mr. Griffin and another equally difficult man, Mr. Josh Egan (Maurice Manson). The two men are bitter rivals. Dorothy suggests having both men over for dinner and they can sign the contract then. George worries that the deal could fall through. Egan comes by the house to look over the contract. Dorothy mentions dinner and Egan puts in a request for a certain meal. Harvey calls and George invites him to dinner. Griffin requests a different meal. Hazel has a plan. That night, Harvey and then Egan arrive and start insulting each other. George tries to lighten the mood, but it doesn't work. George is just about to have the men sign the contract when Hazel announces dinner. She pulls a surprise dinner on both of them, when they each expected something else. Griffin is upset and gets up to leave. Hazel smooths things over with Harvey and gets the men to sign the contract.
| 103 | 4 | "Marriage Trap" "George's Law Partner" | William D. Russell | Robert Riley Crutcher | October 8, 1964 |
George's secretary Linda Sterling (Linda Marshall) had an argument with her boyfriend Phil Merrick (Ken Berry). She decides to go out with another man from the law firm, Harry Noll (Lauren Gilbert). Hazel invites Phil over and learns about the breakup which stemmed from a misunderstanding. Linda comes by with some contracts for George. Hazel tells Phil to take a walk around the block and she'll straighten things out with Linda. Linda tells Hazel that she was at a party with Harry and she is now engaged to him. Harry comes by to talk to George. Harry tells George he felt pressured to ask Linda to marry him and she, in the heat of the moment, accepted. Both of them immediately regret it, but don't know how to tell each other. Phil comes back and Hazel tells him to take another walk. George wants to sit the two of them down and try to get both of them off the hook. Before he can, they both run out of the house and bump into each other. They have an awkward conversation and go back in the house. George starts to talk to them, but then a crowd of friends burst into the Baxter house to wish the couple well. They even bring a woman from the marriage license bureau. Hazel finds a way to get Linda and Phil back together and they get married right then.
| 104 | 5 | "The Flagpole" | William D. Russell | Robert Riley Crutcher | October 15, 1964 |
George returns from Washington D.C. George's work with the Defense Department results in him receiving a large flag as a gift. George gets a call from Mr. Griffin. Harvey never got the contracts that Harry Noll was supposed to draw up. Because of this, George and Harry have a fight. They make up until George catches Harry in a lie that could end their friendship. George gets upset when Hazel wants to buy a thirty foot flagpole for the front yard. Mr. Pincus (Frank Cady), the flagpole salesman, tries to convince George the pole is worth it. Meanwhile, because of the way Pincus parked his truck and then George parking by it, a large traffic jam occurs outside the house. Pincus leaves with the pole and George gets a traffic ticket. Hazel must come up with a way to mend the friendship and keep the flagpole. Hazel's first attempt to get the men together backfires. But she finally succeeds in mending the friendship. There's a little problem when the flagpole is installed.
| 105 | 6 | "Welcome Back, Kevin" | William D. Russell | William Cowley | October 22, 1964 |
George's nephew Kevin Burkett (Michael Callan) is discharged from the army and comes for a visit. Apparently, while he was away, Kevin's wife Helen (Maggie Blye) asked for a divorce. George and Dorothy are worried because Kevin is staying in his room and isn't talking to anyone. Kevin tells Hazel that his friends stopped writing him and he now wants nothing to do with them. Hazel wants to get all his friends to come to a surprise party for Kevin. Hazel calls a couple friends and they want nothing to do with Kevin. Hazel speaks with another friend, Bill Kincaid and his wife Gloria. She finds out that Kevin wanted Bill to spy on Helen because Kevin thought she was going out with other men. Gloria says that Kevin asked his other friends to also spy on Helen. Bill says that Helen repeatedly told Kevin there was no one else, but Kevin wouldn't believe her. Hazel confronts Kevin and he says he thought Helen was unfaithful due to Hazel's letters. It appears Kevin misinterpreted what Hazel said and his jealous side overtook him. Kevin speaks to Helen and they agree to try and work things out. Jerry Dexter as Cab Driver.
| 106 | 7 | "Mind Your Own Business" | William D. Russell | Keith Fowler & Phil Leslie | October 29, 1964 |
George has had enough of Hazel's constant interference in his business. He makes a new rule that Hazel stays out of his and his friends affairs and he'll stay out of hers. Mr. Griffin tells George that he wants Hazel's opinion on a new disposable skillet he's thinking of investing in. George has to bend his rule with Hazel. But to have some fun, Hazel won't give her opinion on the skillet. The next day Hazel tells Rosie about George's rule. Hazel decides to tell George her thoughts on the skillet, but he thinks she is turning him down again and he won't listen. Now Hazel is going to make George stew for a little while. At a restaurant, Harvey speaks with a Gypsy fortune teller, Madame Fureena. She tells him he needs a woman's opinion about the deal he is contemplating. Griffin calls Hazel, but she won't give him an answer. Harvey is now upset with George. Hazel overhears Dorothy tell George that he needs to beg Hazel to help him. George says that both Harvey and Hazel are too stubborn. With Dorothy's help, Hazel comes up with a plan where she can get George to get rid of the interfering pact. She gives her opinion on the skillet to Harvey. She also makes George think it was his idea to break the pact. After Hazel calls Rosie, George isn't so sure he outsmarted Hazel. Francine York as Monica Yates.
| 107 | 8 | "High Finance Hits a New Low" | William D. Russell | Teleplay by Louella MacFarlane; Story by Rik Vollaerts | November 5, 1964 |
Dorothy wants to invite the Johnson's over for their wedding anniversary. Hazel tells George about the gift Herbert wants to buy for Harriet. George says that the Johnson's muddled finances have become a problem for the couple. Hazel and Dorothy would like George to help, but he's not interested. Hazel goes to see the Johnson's and hints that they should talk to George. George reluctantly agrees to help them. For the time being, George puts the Johnsons on a very tight budget. George finds some more bad investments made by the Johnson's. Herbert and Harriet keep asking George for an advance so they can buy each other anniversary gifts. George panics when he thinks he has lost some of the Johnsons stocks and bonds and now has to tell them. Meanwhile, Harriet and Herbert buy each other expensive anniversary presents. George wants to know where they got the money. They each come up with a far fetched explanation. George initially thinks the Johnson's took the bonds to get the money. It comes out that each of them, without knowing the other did it as well, sold some of their possessions to pay for the gifts. The Baxters find out that Smiley buried the envelope with the stocks and bonds in the yard after he digs it up.
| 108 | 9 | "Just Me, Harold and the Universe" | William D. Russell | Frank Crow | November 12, 1964 |
Lester Morton (Woodrow Parfrey), from the employment agency, comes to see Hazel. He asks Hazel if she wanted to work for one of his clients. Lester tells Hazel that he's sponsoring a contest to find the best housekeeper in town. The top prize is a trip for two to the World's Fair in New York. Hazel enters because she would like to take Harold for his birthday. Hazel becomes a finalist. Rosie is upset that she wasn't picked. Hazel wears herself out cleaning the house to impress the judges. Miss Dart and Mrs. Plunkett (Sue England), from the Home Making Class at school, come by. They find Hazel nodding off in the kitchen. The home inspection is a little nerve-racking for Hazel. She will be notified later how she did. Hazel gets a telegram stating that she is tied for first place with a Louise Masters (Peggy Rea), a widower with a little boy. Hazel feels sorry for Louise and throws the final bake-off so Louise can win. Once the family realizes what Hazel did, George says he'll take the whole family to the World's Fair.
| 109 | 10 | "Mix-Up on Marshall Road" | William D. Russell | Robert Riley Crutcher | November 19, 1964 |
Hazel is helping Howard North (Ross Elliott), the Baxter's neighbor, sell his house. She's putting up for sale signs but she has the Baxter's phone number on it. Howard told her if she sold the house, he'd give her a commission. George needs some papers from his law partner Harry Noll, who's flying in from New York. George needs to go to the courthouse, so he asks Dorothy to meet Harry at the airport. Because Dorothy has plans, George sends Hazel. Before Hazel can leave, Harry shows up at the door. Harry announces that he and Rita (Karen Steele) are married. Hazel recognizes Rita and learns that she is Rita Linda, the singer. Harry mentions that he's looking for a house. At the courthouse, George learns from Bill Murphy that Harry is married. Without consulting George, Hazel and Dorothy show the Noll's the neighbor's house. George tells Hazel he doesn't want Harry living next door. Now Hazel tries to talk the Noll's out of the house, but Harry makes the deal anyway. George suggests to Howard that he sell the house to someone else. George reluctantly accepts the fact that Harry will be his neighbor.
| 110 | 11 | "A Lesson in Diplomacy" | William D. Russell | John McGreevey | November 26, 1964 |
Because he will be out of town, the Mayor Dixon (Willis Bouchey) asks George if he could greet visiting Russian dignitary, Commissar Joseph Pozega (Oscar Homolka) Pozega is apparently quite insufferable. Pozega would like to see a typical American family. After George leaves the Mayor speaks to Mr. Courtney Hicks (Douglas Henderson), a State Dept. Official. The Mayor feels bad because George doesn't know that it is only a test to see if they are capable of hosting the real Russian who arrives in a couple weeks. The fake Pozega is a member of Courtney's staff. At home, George tells Dorothy and Hazel they must not let anything Pozega does upset them. At the airport, Pozega is quite obnoxious and continues to be at the Baxter home. He does enjoy Hazel's Russian meal. At the hotel Pozega tells Hicks he did his best to be annoying and things were a little tense, but the Baxter's didn't get out of control. Despite the Baxter's and Hazel having different plans, Hicks insists they have Pozega over for Thanksgiving. At the Thanksgiving meal, Hazel finally has enough and tells off the Commissar. Later that evening, Pozega and Hicks return and Hicks introduces Pozega as Joe Nemecheck. Hicks explains that the whole thing was a test and they did very well. Even Hazel. Stuart Nisbet as Reporter. George DeNormand as Commuter in Airport.
| 111 | 12 | "To Build or Not to Build" | William D. Russell | Jane Klove & Ted Sherdeman | December 3, 1964 |
Hazel is having trouble with the garbage disposal. George breaks a shelf in the kitchen cupboard. Hazel and Dorothy encourage George to remodel the kitchen. But his initial refusal forces Hazel to take a subconscious means to get him to change his mind. George eventually decides to redo the kitchen. Harry Noll recommends remodeler Clyde Clifton (Guy Raymond). Clyde gives George a very over-priced estimate. George lets Dorothy and Hazel handle getting a contractor. George learns that Harry recommended Clyde because Clyde still owed Harry money from a court case. Harry apologizes and takes George out to lunch. Though it takes longer than he thought it would and it's very inconvenient, George is pleased with the finished kitchen.
| 112 | 13 | "Better to Have Loved and Lost" | William D. Russell | Robert Riley Crutcher | December 10, 1964 |
Harry Noll and his new bride Rita are in the process of moving in next door to the Baxters. Dorothy invites Harry and Rita over for dinner. Rita would like Dorothy's help in decorating the house. Rita tells Hazel she would like her marriage to Harry to be as perfect as George and Dorothy's. Harry finds some woman's negligee in his dresser and throws it in the garbage before Rita sees it. Harry learns that it had been left there by accident when he lent out his old place to his secretary Susan Standish. Hazel finds the negligee in the garbage, and thinking it's Rita's, gives it back to her. Hazel tells Dorothy about Harry accidentally throwing away Rita's negligee. Harry explains to Dorothy and Hazel that the negligee belonged to Susan and how he came to find it. He says he told Rita, but he doesn't think she believes him. George and Susan head to Harry's house to retrieve some papers that a judge needs. Meanwhile, Harry asks Hazel and Dorothy to describe Susan as an unattractive old woman to Rita. They refuse and want Harry to tell Rita the truth. Harry starts to tell Rita the truth but then he says Susan's an old woman. Harry almost gets caught in his lie when George and Susan walk up to the house. Harold tells George he needs to go home to call the office. Rita tells Dorothy that she's seen a picture of Susan and knows she's young and pretty. Hazel and Dorothy find a way to bring Harry and Rita together.
| 113 | 14 | "Hazel Squares the Triangle" | William D. Russell | Louella MacFarlane | December 17, 1964 |
George's sister Deirdre and her husband Harry come by the Baxters. Deirdre is very excited because Harry will be made vice president of the home office. Harry announces that he doesn't want the job. Harry tells Deirdre that he is retiring and moving to Bora Bora. He'll go without her if need be. Deirdre is in the guest room and Doctor Summerfield (Henry Hunter) comes to check her out. George and Dorothy have a fight over who is right between Harry and Deirdre. The next day, Harold is worried because his parents aren't speaking to each other. Harry is staying at a gentleman's club. Hazel tells George and Dorothy about Harold and they make up. Hazel has a talk with Deirdre and finds out how much she really cares for Harry. Hazel goes to the club, but the Doorman (Peter Forster) won't let her in. In the club the Clerk (William Bakewell) gives Harry several messages. Hazel sneaks into the club through a service entrance. The Laundry Man (Joe Ploski) sees her and calls the Clerk. Some club members are shocked to see Hazel. Hazel gives Harry a message from Deirdre that brings her and Harry back together. Harry agrees to take the vice president job after he and Deirdre take a second honeymoon to Bora Bora. George DeNormand as Club Member.
| 114 | 15 | "Just 86 Shopping Minutes to Christmas" | William D. Russell | Louella MacFarlane | December 24, 1964 |
Dorothy doesn't recognize the names on a Christmas card the family received. George doesn't care who the people are. Harry Noll and his wife Rita come by. Harry brags to George about how he's going to surprise Rita with a mink coat for Christmas. Later, Rita mentions the outdoor Christmas decorations she's thinking of getting. George isn't interested in the commercialism of Christmas. He doesn't want to exchange gifts this year. George also wants a simple Christmas meal without a lot of people. Harry asks George to hide the mink coat he bought at George's house. George gets upset when he learns there will be 27 people for Christmas dinner. Hazel finds Harry's present and now her and Dorothy believe the mink is for Dorothy. Dorothy later finds out from Harry that the mink is for Rita and is very disappointed. Hazel tries to get a nice gift for Dorothy to make up for it. The Credit Manager (C. Lindsay Workman) calls George to verify Hazel is a good credit risk. He also mentions that the gift would be for Dorothy. George says that an account won't be necessary. George changes his mind about the Christmas spirit and buys Dorothy the gift that Hazel wanted to purchase, a blue negligee. Molly Dodd as Secretary Miss Scott. Song: Shirley sings "O Evergreen".
| 115 | 16 | "Champagne Tony" | William D. Russell | Teleplay By; Robert Riley Crutcher; Story By; James Fonda | January 7, 1965 |
Hazel suggests to George that he and some other prominent citizens organize a professional golf tournament for the town. George thinks it's a silly idea. Just then Dorothy tells George that Mayor Dixon wants to bring a golf tournament to the town and wants George to handle it. Later, George wants Dorothy to go with him to pick up Golfer Tony Lema at the airport. Against George's wishes, Hazel goes with. At the airport, a Policeman (Hal Baylor) parks George's car in the reserved area. Mrs. 'Baby' Gollard (Kathie Browne), who has a car that looks exactly like the Baxter's, parks right next to it. While Tony is talking to the reporters, George tells Hazel to put Tony's golf clubs in the car. Hazel mistakenly puts the clubs in Baby's car trunk. Baby picked up her husband Bill (Donald Briggs). When Bill sees the clubs, he thinks Baby is seeing another man. Hazel discovers she put the clubs in the wrong car and it's now gone. Tony tells George and Dorothy how much his clubs mean to him. Hazel asks Miss Logan (Alice Backes) at the Information Booth if she knows who the other car belonged to. George learns what Hazel did. What follows is a mad scramble to find the clubs without letting Tony know they're gone. Hazel eventually recovers the clubs and Bill promises to never be jealous again.
| 116 | 17 | "It's a Dog's Life" "It's a Dog's World" | William D. Russell | Jane Klove & Ted Sherdeman | January 14, 1965 |
George reluctantly agrees to have Ashton Durham (Hardie Albright) and his wife (Lee Patrick) as house guests. They couldn't stay at the hotel because there was a problem with little Rodney. The Durhams arrive and it turns out Rodney is their untrained bulldog. Because the Durhams may be staying a week, George tells Dorothy that she should take Smiley to a kennel. George explains it to Harold. The next morning Mrs. Durham gives Hazel a list of the special meals Rodney eats. Hazel has to chase Rodney off of George's favorite chair. Mailman Barney (Robert B. Williams) comes by and Rodney chases him up a tree. The next day, Barney is chased up the tree again. Hazel tries to train Rodney, but she doesn't get too far. Hazel learns about the dog's allergy. She goes to the garden store and buys a bunch of ragweed. This causes the Durhams and Rodney to leave quickly.
| 117 | 18 | "Love 'Em and Leave 'Em" | William D. Russell | Robert Riley Crutcher | January 21, 1965 |
Harold trades his prized football for a date to the school party with a girl named Zelda Warren. Harold calls Zelda and she's looking forward to the party. Hazel asks Harold where the football is as it was a Christmas gift from her and he says he lost it in the park. Hazel goes to the park and sees the boy playing with the football. Dorothy sees Hazel walking back to the house and she looks very depressed. Hazel tells Dorothy and George that Harold traded the football to go out with a girl. Hazel thinks that Harold is growing up too fast and that she is losing him. Harold tells them he wants to buy a corsage for a girl. Harold would rather that George not drive him to the party. While George is on the phone, Harold runs out of the house. Hazel catches up with Harold and Zelda and drives them. She then embarrasses him when she stays at the dance to chaperone and cleans ice cream off his jacket. Miss Tilcy (Virginia Gregg), the teacher, tries to explain to Hazel that she humiliated Harold in front of the other children. Hazel leaves and walks home, forgetting the car. Harold loses interest in Zelda when she tries to change him. Hazel realizes that Harold isn't growing up that fast and she still has him for a while.
| 118 | 19 | "Temper, Temper" | William D. Russell | John McGreevey | February 4, 1965 |
Mr. Sutherland (Vinton Hayworth) tells George that volatile Italian opera singer Bianca Bellina (Barbara Shelley) will be singing with the local symphony. Sutherland wants George to meet with her and hopefully keep her happy. Meanwhile, Hazel tells Dorothy that she hasn't decided who will be her escort to the Bowling League dance. Hazel's friend Enzo Martelli (Gregory Morton) returns. Enzo says that his brother Georgio came with him. Enzo agrees to take Hazel to the dance. Bianca plays the diva act to the hilt by refusing to perform at the function. Sutherland and George tell her the concert is sold out. George has Bianca over for dinner. Enzo comes by and asks Hazel to get Bianca to autograph a picture of herself. After a while Bianca throws another tantrum. Hazel gets Enzo to calm Bianca down. Enzo and Hazel had a date, but Hazel gets Enzo to take Bianca to her hotel. The next day George calls Hazel and asks if Enzo could come by the rehearsal hall to calm down Bianca. Bianca will not perform at the concert unless Enzo is there and it is the same night as Hazel's dance. Enzo will not break his date with Hazel. George asks Hazel to get Enzo to change his mind and he does. It's the night of the concert and Enzo calls Hazel and says he's taking her to the dance. When Enzo picks up Hazel he tells her that his brother Georgio, who looks similar, is filling in at the concert. The autographed picture was for Georgio, who is a fan of Bianca's.
| 119 | 20 | "Bonnie Boy" | William D. Russell | Fredric M. Frank | February 11, 1965 |
Hazel's friend Matilda (Florence Sundstrom), who works for Mayor Dixon, comes by. Hazel tells her it's George's birthday and the golf balls she ordered as a present didn't arrive. Matilda is selling sweepstakes tickets. She talks Hazel into giving George one as a present. George comes home and mentions that Mayor Dixon appointed him to a special task force on gambling related sweepstakes tickets. Before George can open Hazel's present, she switches it for something different. Hazel goes to return the ticket to Matilda. Matilda says she's already turned in the book with the names of people who received tickets. Hazel might as well keep the ticket. Reporters inform George about the ticket and publish the story in the paper, even though George claims he doesn't have the ticket. Mayor Dixon calls Hazel and says he saw the newspaper and wants to talk to George tonight. When Hazel finds out about the problems her present is causing, she gives the ticket to the Salvation Army. The ticket winds up being a winner. Hazel confesses to George and the Mayor that she bought the ticket. Despite George's constant interrogation, Hazel won't say who she bought the ticket from. The next morning, Dixon and Matilda come by because Matilda confessed. The Salvation Army Leader (Arthur Peterson Jr.) brings a band to the Baxter's house to thank him for the donation. It turns out to be great publicity for George and the Mayor.
| 120 | 21 | "Stop Rockin' Our Reception" | William D. Russell | Jane Klove & Ted Sherdeman | February 18, 1965 |
George has hurt his back. After enduring no television reception for days, Hazel calls Mr. Gilbert the "TV Doctor" (Reginald Gardiner). At first Gilbert isn't interested in the job, but George finally convinces him to come over. Harold would like to set up short-wave radio in his room and asks his parents if it's OK. Harold says his new friend Bruce Camden would help him. Hazel comes in the room wearing a blonde wig she won at the bowling tournament. Dorothy and Harold are polite about it, but George just laughs at Hazel. Mr. Gilbert comes by and despite the reception still being bad, he claims there is nothing wrong with the TV. He says there is some outside disturbance causing the problem. Dorothy suggests going to Harry Noll's house to watch the golf tournament. Just then Harry calls and asks if he could come over because his TV isn't working. This leads George to believe that Bruce's short-wave is the problem. George speaks with Mr. Camden (William Bramley) and Bruce and they say that the radio could not be the issue. George still thinks it's Bruce's fault. Harold feels bad that George blamed his friend. A man (Morgan Jones) from the power company comes by because he was sent by Mr. Camden. He discovers that a faulty thermostat in George's heating pad is causing the interference. George gets Bruce a gift as an apology and makes amends with Mr. Camden.
| 121 | 22 | "What's Bugging Hazel?" | William D. Russell | Robert Riley Crutcher | February 25, 1965 |
Hazel's friend Gus Anderson (Paul Barselou) wants to buy his wife Millie some new furniture. Hazel co-signed a loan for Gus, but the bank still turned him down. Now Gus doesn't have the money for the furniture. Josh Egan comes by and tells George that he found out his office was bugged with a listening device. Egan believes his rival department store Mohawk might be trying to find out where he will build his next store. Egan sees Harold and Gus playing with the listening device that he just showed George. When Hazel tells Egan that Gus works at the Mohawk store, Egan thinks Gus is the spy. George, Hazel and Dorothy don't believe Gus would do that. Before they can confront him, Gus goes back to work. Mr. Wilson (Jonathan Hole), the Floor Walker at Mohawk, was filling in for Gus at the Information Desk. Wilson is upset that Gus was gone so long. George and Egan show up and talk with Gus. Wilson sees this and calls the boss, Mr. Roland (Parley Baer). Wilson tells Mr. Roland that Gus was talking to Egan and Egan's lawyer, George Baxter. Mr. Roland thinks Gus is spying for Egan and fires him. Mr. Egan gets the land he wanted. George and Egan are so happy, they get Gus a better paying job and Egan will Gus the furniture he wanted for free.
| 122 | 23 | "Hazel's Day in Court" | William D. Russell | Louella MacFarlane | March 4, 1965 |
George calls Dorothy and tells her he got the Mayor to agree to paint in the crosswalk nearby. A Policeman (John Cliff) arrests Hazel after she takes matters into her own hands by painting the crosswalk for increased safety. Hazel learns from George and Dorothy about the Mayor's decision. Donald Burton (Hugh Marlowe), a reporter, hears about Hazel's story and hopes to use it to harm the Mayor politically. George agrees to defend her in court on the condition she doesn't say a word. In court Hazel is brought before the Judge (Lewis Martin). Hazel can't help but speak up and George resigns as her lawyer. Before she leaves the courtroom, Burton introduces himself and takes her out for coffee. Burton prints her story in the paper. Harold and Dorothy see the front page article about Hazel. George tells Dorothy that Burton is clearly using Hazel to hurt the Mayor and Dorothy agrees. At her next court appearance, Burton arranged for Philip Grantson (Charles Macaulay) to defend her. Hazel starts to realize that Grantson just wants to ruin the reputation of George and the Mayor. Hazel fires Grantson and the Judge allows Hazel to defend her actions. The Judge finds Hazel guilty and sentences her to three days in jail and a $50 fine. He then suspends both. Hazel also has a few words for Burton.
| 123 | 24 | "Hazel's Inquisitive Mind" | William D. Russell | William Cowley | March 11, 1965 |
George wants to get his new neighbor, Malcolm P. Denton (Howard Wendell), as a client. But he doesn't feel it would be ethical to just ask Denton. Mr. Griffin is a friend of Denton's and maybe George could get Griffin to recommend him to Denton. Hazel wants to help George and figures that if she can meet the Denton's maid, that could help. Hazel and Rosie visit the Denton's and discover the maid is a man named Mike Shiga (Aki Aleong). Hazel is intent on having Mike become an honorary Sunshine Girl. Meanwhile, Denton calls Griffin and invites him to lunch. Denton's lawyer is retiring and he needs a replacement. Mr. Griffin and George separately and mistakenly believe they will be asked to become an honorary Sunshine Girl. The executive board of the Sunshine Girls is holding a meeting and Rosie states that the constitution doesn't allow for an honorary member. Hazel gets George, who wrote the constitution, to tell her she's wrong. Griffin tells Dorothy that he's to be an honorary member. Dorothy tells George and Hazel what Griffin believes. George goes to talk to Griffin. Dorothy learns from Hazel that it's Mike Shiga that they're considering. She then tells a surprised George. Hazel and the girls inform Mike that they've made him an honorary member. But to the girls chagrin, he declines. Despite an embarrassing moment at the Denton house, Hazel still manages to get George the account. Alice Nunn as Hildegarde. Queenie Leonard as Mert. Ruth Clifford as Mrs. Denton.
| 124 | 25 | "George's Man Friday" | William D. Russell | Keith Fowler & Phil Leslie | March 18, 1965 |
George is representing a drifter named Al Dewitt (Paul Hartman) in Judge Winston's (Harold Gould) court. Things get a little confusing when Hazel takes the witness stand. Al is found not guilty. Because George didn't charge Al, he wants to repay George by doing countless favors for him. However, he manages to mess up every time. At the office, George tells Secretary Miss Scott that he doesn't want to see lawyer Mr. Lyons (Ivan Bonar). Lyons wants to rush George into an out of court settlement. Thanks to Al, Lyons does see George. In an effort to get Al to move on and knowing he's been dodging marriage, Hazel flirts with him to scare him off. But that backfires when he proposes to her. Something George says gives Hazel an idea. Hazel scares Al when she tries to change him. Hazel then enlists Milkman Norval (Owen Bush) to pretend he got Al a job at the Dairy. Al changes his mind about getting married and leaves.
| 125 | 26 | "The Investor" | William D. Russell | Louella MacFarlane | March 25, 1965 |
George wants to stop by the Mueller's Bakery to get their signatures on an option to buy the place. Mrs. Mueller has agreed to sell, but Mr. Mueller (John Banner) wants to hang on to the place. George also wants to know what Hazel did with the money her nephew sent her. He wants to make sure she invests it well. Hazel goes to Mueller's Bakery. He tells her that because of George's suggestion, his wife left him to retire in California. Mueller offers to make Hazel a partner and sell her a share of the business if she helps him with the place. George calls Mr. Egan and tells him that Mueller refuses to sell the business to him. Hazel tells George she invested in the bakery. Hazel picks up the homemade shoes she ordered from Signor Antonio (Frank Puglia). They don't look that good, but they are comfortable. Dorothy tells George to not laugh at Hazel's shoes. Hazel is wearing herself out putting in late hours at the bakery. An exhausted Hazel takes a nap, oversleeps and misses picking up Mr. Egan at the airport. Egan shows up angry because he wasn't picked up. Hazel has good news. Mueller eventually realizes his wife was right, sells the business to Mr. Egan, and leaves to reunite with his wife. Hazel makes a nice profit on the deal.

=== Season 5 (1965–66) ===
For the final season, the show was moved from NBC to CBS, and changes were made to the main cast of characters.

| No. overall | No. in season | Title | Directed by | Written by | Original release date |
|---|---|---|---|---|---|
| 126 | 1 | "Who's in Charge Here?" | E.W. Swackhamer | William Cowley | September 13, 1965 |
Hazel tells Mert (Queenie Leonard) and Barney (Robert B. Williams) that George and Dorothy have moved to Bagdad to work on one of Mr. Griffin's oil deals. Rosie (Maudie Prickett) wants to know why the Baxters didn't take Harold with them. Hazel says they wanted him to stay in school here. Hazel and Harold will be moving in with George's brother Steve (Ray Fulmer), his wife Barbara (Lynn Borden), and their daughter Suzie (Julia Benjamin). Meanwhile, Barbara is panicking because she hasn't had time to straighten up the house before Hazel arrives. Steve believes he will be able to show Hazel who's the boss. Millie Ballard (Ann Jillian), Steve's receptionist, calls to say that the Dunlaps (Ernest Truex and Sylvia Field) are at his office. They are in the market for a house and would like Steve to show them a few. Later, Steve tells Barbara that he thinks he found a home for the Dunlaps. They will give Steve their decision this afternoon. Hazel arrives, and despite Steve trying to lay down the rules, she will clearly be running the household. Steve learns quickly that he can't pull a fast one on Hazel. The Dunlaps tell Steve that they are having second thoughts about the house. Hazel, in her own way, gets the Dunlap's to buy the house that Steve showed them. It's the middle of the night and Hazel receives a call from George and Dorothy. Don Kennedy as Fireman Harry. Note: Sylvia Field is best known for playing Mrs. Martha Wilson (Mr. Wilson's wife) on the television sitcom Dennis the Menace.
| 127 | 2 | "Hazel's Second Week" | E.W. Swackhamer | William Cowley | September 20, 1965 |
Barbara's friend Mona Williams (Mala Powers) is green with envy that Barbara has a maid. Hazel meets Mona. Mona gets upset when Hazel says a hat she bought inexpensively looks like Mona's expensive hat. Barbara tells Mona that she feels useless as Hazel is an all-efficient maid and a fantastic cook. Rosie comes by and asks Hazel how she likes working for Steve and the family. Hazel says that sometimes she has to stop Barbara from doing her job. Steve comes home and makes Mona upset when he says she has a hat just like Hazel's. Barbara offers to make Steve some hors d'oeuvres. Just then Hazel walks in with some. Steve senses something is bothering Barbara. Steve tells Barbara that she needs to assert herself more when it comes to Hazel. Barbara becomes furious when Hazel adds a few things to her Hollandaise Sauce that makes it much better. After dinner, Harold tells Hazel about his new school and the kids there. Barbara starts to have a talk with Hazel, but then she has to put Suzie to bed. When she comes back, Hazel is packing to leave. Barbara and Hazel continue their talk and they come to an understanding. Mona and her husband Fred (Charles Bateman) come by to play Bridge. Fred mentions that Hazel's hat looks just like Mona's.
| 128 | 3 | "How to Lose 30 Pounds in 30 Minutes" | E.W. Swackhamer | Robert Riley Crutcher | September 27, 1965 |
Because of something Steve's salesman Bill Fox (Laurence Haddon) said, Hazel is dieting, but doesn't want anyone to know. Meanwhile, Bill is working on a deal to have Mr. Bates (J. Edward McKinley) buy the Ferguson property. Hazel brings lunch for Millie at Steve's office. Millie can't eat it because she has to get some papers from Mr. Ferguson. Bill catches Hazel eating some of it. Hazel wants to sign up for a weight-loss program run by Miss Wilson (Lee Meriwether). The course costs a little more than she has right now. Wanting to earn extra money, Hazel hopes to sell real estate for Steve. Steve initially says no, but later gives in. Bill does a little finagling and finalizes the deal with Bates. Not knowing this, Hazel goes to see Bates. Hazel thinks she has sold the property to Bates. To celebrate, Hazel buys a new dress that is two sizes too small and she signed up for the course. The mix-up with the Bates deal leads Hazel to lose her commission. Hazel goes to one weight-loss session and returns completely worn out. Hazel is now happy when she learns she won't get the commission. She would like to cancel the program, but finds out she can't get out of the contract. Hazel in turn manages to get Bill's wife (Joan Shawlee) to take the course and pay for it.
| 129 | 4 | "Do Not Disturb Occupants" | Charles Barton | John McGreevey | October 11, 1965 |
Steve is trying to find a house for the Stonehams, but is having a hard time. They had been living in a furnished apartment for 23 years and don't know what to look for in a house. Hazel gets a letter from George and Dorothy. Barbara tells Hazel how many different homes her and Steve have lived in. Hazel helps teach Suzie how to shoot marbles. Just then, Steve brings Charles Stoneham (Oliver McGowan) back to his house to pick up something. Charles takes a shot with the marbles. Hazel shows Charles around the house and really talks it up. Charles finds Steve's house very charming. Steve credits Hazel with him selling his own house to Charles. At first Steve and Barbara are very happy with the deal, but soon they both have sellers remorse. Mrs. Edith Stoneham (Edith Atwater) likes the house, but feels funny taking it from the Baxters. Edith would like to see the house that Barbara is going to take. Edith actually likes that home better and Barbara is more than happy to let her have it instead.
| 130 | 5 | "The Holdout" | E.W. Swackhamer | Robert Riley Crutcher | October 18, 1965 |
J.B. Turner (James Westerfield) wants to build a 12-story building. Bill Fox and Steve try to tell him the land acquisition is blocked by Hazel's friend Minnie Anderson (Ellen Corby). They even offered her one of Turner's homes in exchange. Turner gives Steve one day to make the deal. Hazel talks to Minnie and finds out she doesn't want to sell because her grandfather built the house. Plus, he put in his will that the house shouldn't be sold. Believing in a supernatural message she thinks she got, Minnie does decide to sell the house to Turner. Steve calls Turner's secretary, Miss Alice Cameron (Shannon Farnon), but she doesn't know where Turner is. Steve gives Harold a letter to mail that has the contract for Turner. Harold gets distracted by Suzie building a doll house and helps her. Steve learns that Minnie's new home will be right next to a new airport and Bill knew about it. Now that Steve and Hazel know that Minnie's been swindled, Steve tries to find Harold and stop him from mailing the letter. Before Steve can stop him, Harold runs to the mailbox and puts the letter in. The next day, Steve and Barbara go to Turner's office to try and get the letter, but they don't. Turner is at the Baxter house with the letter. Hazel manages to destroy the letter. They finally get Turner to give Minnie a much nicer house in a nicer location and some extra money.
| 131 | 6 | "A-Haunting We Will Go" | Charles Barton | John McGreevey | October 25, 1965 |
Steve learns that the Garrisons are moving out of a house he recently sold them. They claim that the house is haunted. Steve can't make James Garrison understand there is no such thing as ghosts. Neighbor Marshall Timmons (Vaughn Taylor) tells Steve he's surprised the Garrisons are leaving. He was just getting used to them. Hazel suggests that Steve spend a night in the house. Les Swanton (pre-moustache Dabney Coleman), the Garrison's lawyer, tells Steve that they are suing him and the former owners. Because of this, Steve and Barbara do decide to spend a night in the home to see what this ghost really is. They also see and hear strange things and go running out of the house. Hazel meets Marshall and his three dogs. He says he used to have 14. That night Hazel stays in the haunted house and starts to hear strange things. She discovers the ghost is really Marshall. Apparently, the Garrison's had filed a complaint and had 11 of his dogs removed. He was afraid the family would make him get rid of his remaining 3 dogs. Marshall was hoping someone that liked dogs would then move in. The Garrison's move back in and Marshall can keep his 3 dogs. Rich Correll as Richie Garrison. Note: Fans of The Donna Reed Show will recognize the empty haunted house interior as the living room set used for her series (1958-1966), it would soon be revamped and used as the living room set for the I Dream of Jeannie series (1965-1970). Also of note, when they are shown on the porch of the haunted house, the very popular series Bewitched (1964-1972) house is displayed.
| 132 | 7 | "Hazel Needs a Car" | Charles Barton | William Cowley | November 1, 1965 |
Hazel comes by Steve's office to bring him the vitamins that he always avoids taking, but he isn't there. Hazel tells secretary Millie that she wants to buy a car. She's going to ask Steve to help her with the down payment. Millie says that Steve is not in a good mood today. Hazel figures if she butters Steve up enough, she can get money. Meanwhile, land developer J.B. Turner cancels Steve out of a deal he spent a month working on. Mona shows off her new mink to Barbara and Barbara would like one as well. Everyone in the family wants something from Steve, so they are all being extra nice to him. Then he figures out what's going on and turns everyone down. Mona gets a little upset when Harold tells her that minks are just weasels. Hazel and Harold go to Mr. Foster's (Louis Quinn) pet store. Because Steve refused to lend Hazel the money to buy a car, she goes into the fish breeding business to raise the money. Hazel sets up the fish tank in Steve's office. Hazel will give Millie a commission on any pair of fish she sells. Knowing Turner is into tropical fish, Hazel brings some of her rare Swordtail fish to his office. He really wants the fish. Hazel gets him to agree to bring Steve back on the deal he worked on and she gets the money she needs for a car. Barbara talks Steve into getting her a mink stole. Shannon Farnon as Alice, Turner's secretary.
| 133 | 8 | "Hazel Sits It Out" | Charles Barton | Teleplay By; Robert Riley Crutcher; Story By; James Fonda | November 8, 1965 |
Steve is preparing to take the family on a fishing and bird watching picnic. Angry client Mr. Bullock (Malcolm Atterbury) informs Steve that there is no one showing his house. Harold forgot to tell Steve that his agent, Joe Abrams, had to take his wife to the hospital. So Steve can still go on the picnic, Hazel volunteers to show the house. Steve tells her she can't close any deals, just give out information. At Bullock's house, neighbor Mrs. Clark (Mabel Albertson - Darrin's mother on Bewitched) comes by. Steve tells Hazel that Mrs. Clark comes by every time there's an open house. Mrs. Clark says she is very choosy over who will be her neighbor. If she doesn't like the buyer, she points out things that are wrong with the house. Hazel shows the house to several prospects of various backgrounds. Mr. Bullock objects to Hazel serving as Steve's substitute in showing the house and wants to get another realtor. Hazel ends up selling the house to Mrs. Hardy (Eleanor Audley) and at a good price. Hazel also manages to reunite a separated couple, Jim (Henry Hunter) and Agatha Lucas (Catherine McLeod), that use to own the house. Mr. Bullock comes back with a paper to terminate his association with Steve, but then he hears the house is sold. Guest stars: Jack Dodson (Howard Sprague from The Andy Griffith Show) and Bonnie Franklin (from One Day at a Time). Trivia note: Mabel Albertson also played Howard Sprague's mother on The Andy Griffith Show.
| 134 | 9 | "A Lot to Remember" | E.W. Swackhamer | Jane Klove & Ted Sherdeman | November 15, 1965 |
When something comes up that prevents Steve from going, Hazel and Barbara go to a land auction because there is a plot of land that Steve wants. He gives them a limit of how high they can bid. They get out bid and don't get the land. Hazel gets caught up in bidding and wins a plot of land for a $285. Back at home, Steve is glad that they stuck to his limit. Hazel tells him she won a plot of land and he's surprised at how little she paid. When they go to see it, they find out it is a very small strip of land. Hazel tries to get her money back from the county, but can't. She then learns she will have to pay an assessment fee for lights being put on that block. Hazel tries to sell the land to J. M. Carter (Harry Harvey Sr.), a neighbor, but he's not interested. Hazel gets another assessment for sewer work. Hazel finally finds Laura Kirkland (Anne Seymour), a woman who was interested in the same plot of land at the auction. She buys the property from Hazel. Mrs. Kirkland wanted the land to put up a statue of an ancestor. Later, Steve tells Hazel she still has to pay an escrow fee. Douglas Evans as Commissioner. John Hiestand as Auctioneer. Stanley Farrar as Cashier. Kirk Alyn as Bidder.
| 135 | 10 | "A Bull's Eye for Cupid" | Charles Barton | Louella MacFarlane | November 22, 1965 |
Hazel's friend Enzo Martelli (Gregory Morton) is in town and asks her out on a date for tomorrow night. Hazel will let him know if she can get off. Barbara and Mona come back from shopping. Barbara mentions to Hazel that tomorrow is her and Steve's anniversary. Steve and Fred arrive and Hazel reminds Steve about the anniversary. He forgot all about it and made plans to go fishing with Fred. With Hazel's help, Steve pretends that he and Fred intended to take the wives along on the trip the whole time. Hazel calls the Campground Proprietor (William Fawcett) to let him know there will be four people instead of two. Enzo calls again and Hazel tells him she has to stay home to watch the kids. She invites Enzo over for dinner. Once at the cabin, Barbara finds out the truth and is very disappointed with Steve. Barbara doesn't want Mona to find out. The next day, Steve calls Hazel and asks her if she could come and pick him and Barbara up as she is not happy. Something Mona says makes Barbara realize she should be happy. When Hazel arrives with the kids, Steve tells her that they are all going to stay. Hazel won't be able to keep her date with Enzo. Barbara suggests that Hazel call Enzo and ask him to come here and they could get him a cabin.
| 136 | 11 | "The Crush" | William D. Russell | Robert Riley Crutcher | November 29, 1965 |
Teenage secretary Millie has an obsessive crush on Steve. Barbara and Hazel are having fun teasing Steve about it. Steve says that if things don't change, he'll have to fire Millie. Meanwhile, Steve would like to sub-divide some land that Miss Warren (Kathryn Givney) owns, but she is not interested. Hazel is surprised when Millie tells her that Steve writes passionate poetry. Steve explains to Barbara and Hazel that he wrote one poem in college and the school paper published it. That's what Millie must have found. Mr. Ballard (Philip Ober), Millie's father, comes by to speak to Steve. Steve is a little concerned as Ballard has a shotgun with him. Ballard explains that he was skeet shooting. Ballard begs Steve to find a way to stop her crush, as everything in his house is now Steve related. Hazel comes up with a plan to disillusion Millie. Steve is to take Millie to Observation Hill and park. But instead of getting romantic, all Steve will do is talk about real estate. Just when Millie is getting bored with Steve talking shop, Steve gets a ticket for trespassing. The next day, Mr. Ballard tells Steve that he is thrilled because Millie isn't interested in him anymore. Steve worries about his reputation when word gets out about his ticket and him being with Millie. Thanks to Hazel, Steve's ticket is removed from record and Miss Warren decides to let Steve sub-divide her land. Harold develops a crush on Millie.
| 137 | 12 | "Kindly Advise" | Charles Barton | Robert Riley Crutcher | December 6, 1965 |
Sister-in-law Deirdre Thompson (Cathy Lewis) is meddling in Barbara's life. She wants Barbara to do more to bring up her social standing and help Steve's career. Deirdre also wants to know why Susie hasn't been enrolled in Miss Peterson's finishing school yet. Barbara tells Deirdre that Susie doesn't want to go to that school. Harold finds Susie hiding under her bed because she doesn't want Deirdre to find her. Deirdre says she'll call the school and make the arrangements. Hazel tries to encourage Barbara to stand up to Deirdre, but Steve thinks the school is a good idea. During dinner with Deirdre and husband Harry, Steve sends Susie to her room claiming she wouldn't behave. Steve catches Hazel trying to bring dinner up to Susie. Susie runs away from home. Despite promising not to say anything, Harold tells Hazel. Hazel searches the neighborhood. Hazel eventually finds Susie sleeping in the attic. Hazel then brings Steve, Barbara and the Thompsons up there. With Hazel's help, Barbara stands up to Deirdre. Steve's glad Barbara did it. The next morning Deirdre comes by and apologizes to the family. She gives Susie the chemistry set she's wanted.
| 138 | 13 | "Noblesse Oblige" | Charles Barton | John McGreevey | December 13, 1965 |
Hazel has an argument with a woman over a parking space. Back at home, Hazel tells Barbara about the other woman. Barbara mentions that Deirdre is arranging for Steve to meet Cora Prichard (Lee Patrick), a wealthy socialite. Deirdre and Cora arrive and Cora is the woman Hazel argued with. Steve would like to meet Cora's husband Everett (Nelson Olmsted), to make a land development deal. Hazel avoids being seen and let's Barbara know about Cora. Cora does wind up seeing Hazel. Later, Cora is having a disagreement with director Mr. Grimes about how she should play the lead role in a play and she quits. His assistant Agnes (Elizabeth Harrower) tells Grimes he needs to get Cora back or there won't be a play. Meanwhile, Hazel mistakes Everett for the Prichard's chauffeur and has a friendly conversation with him. Mr. Grimes sees Hazel and thinks she would be perfect for the lead role in the play. Deirdre tells Steve that Hazel should give up the role so as to not cause problems with the Prichards. Deirdre mentions to Hazel that she took Cora's role. Still thinking he's a chauffeur, Hazel asks Everett's help in fixing things with Cora. Everett helps Hazel keep the lead role in the town pageant and smooth things over with his wife. Hazel is a success in the play.
| 139 | 14 | "Hazel's Endearing Young Charms" | E.W. Swackhamer | Robert Riley Crutcher | December 27, 1965 |
Hazel reminds Harold that they should be grateful that Steve took them in. Steve is surprised at how much Barbara spent for a new dress for the dance that night. He's also upset that a large land deal fell through. Hazel's efforts to win favor with Steve by bragging about his brother George only gives Steve an inferiority complex. Steve now doesn't want to go to the dance. To make Steve feel better, Hazel tells him that George couldn't dance. This boosts Steve's ego and he agrees to go to the dance. Meanwhile, Susie wears Barbara's new dress and gets it all stained and dirty. Now Barbara doesn't want to go to the dance. After Hazel fixes her hair, Barbara does decide to go. She winds up the hit of the party, dancing with all the other men. Back at home, Steve is not happy about being ignored all evening. Hazel tells Barbara that she made up the story about George not being able to dance, which Steve overhears. He wants Hazel gone and says she can stay with Deirdre. The next morning, Steve changes his mind. But then Hazel says something else that annoys Steve and he wants her gone. Marge Henry (Alix Talton), a friend of the Baxters, comes by. Marge offers Hazel a higher paying job as a hairdresser, which Hazel turns down. Steve now definitely wants Hazel to stay when he realizes how much Hazel cares about the family.
| 140 | 15 | "A Car Named Chrysanthemum" | Charles Barton | Louella MacFarlane | January 3, 1966 |
Steve was going to go with Hazel to buy a used car, but something comes up and he can't go. Hazel meets Millie's boyfriend Ted at the car lot. Mr. Haverstraw (Alvy Moore), the used car salesman, will sell Hazel a car, but she needs a co-signer. When Steve sees the contract, he tells Hazel that they are charging her too much and she shouldn't buy that car. Barbara asks Hazel to pick up some flowers at Mr. Ricci's (Peter Brocco) flower shop. Hazel takes Millie and Ted with. Ted sees an old run-down 1930 car there. Ricci says that one of his kids named the car Chrysanthemum. Ricci sells the car to Hazel. Millie and Ted tell Hazel they'll help her restore the car. Steve is not thrilled about Hazel fixing the car up in his driveway. Steve tells Hazel he will help her get another used car, if she takes the old one back to Ricci. Ricci is happy to get his fixed up car back and Hazel gets the used car she wanted from Mr. Haverstraw at a better price. Ricci tells Hazel that business has really picked up since he used the car as a flower display.
| 141 | 16 | "Once an Actor" | William D. Russell | Jane Klove & Ted Sherdeman | January 10, 1966 |
Barbara's Uncle Jerome Van Meter (Pat O'Brien) comes to visit. Steve is not happy about the prospect that he might stay a whole month. He was once a movie star. Without Jerome knowing, Steve, Barbara and Hazel learn he is now virtually penniless. Jerome overhears Harold and Susie talking about him being broke. The next morning Jerome confesses to Hazel and Barbara that he's indigent and he's tired of masquerading as someone still successful. Hazel and Barbara convince Steve to hire him at the real estate office. At first Jerome doesn't think he could do it, but then he accepts the offer. At the office, Millie does what she can to help Jerome. To boost his ego, Millie has some of her girlfriends ask for Jerome's autograph, even though they don't know who he is. Miss Laura Kirkland comes by and tells Steve she doesn't want him handling the sale of her hotel. Jerome admits he made the mistake, not Steve. Laura recognizes Jerome and wants him to handle her account. Later, Jerome tells Steve that Laura wants him to sell the Hastings Farm. Steve says that no realtor would touch that broken down place. Jerome finds buyers for the farm, Mr. and Mrs. Raymond (Hardie Albright and Viola Harris). Also, he gets a telegram from Hollywood for a part in a show. Kirk Alyn as Repairman.
| 142 | 17 | "$285 by Saturday" | Charles Barton | Louella MacFarlane | January 17, 1966 |
Hazel is collecting musical instruments to send to George and Dorothy for a missionary school. At first Steve is upset that Barbara gave Hazel his saxophone, but he let's Hazel have it. Hazel goes to see Mr. Springer (C. Lindsay Workman), the music store salesman. She sees an organ she really wants for the missionary school, but it costs $285. Mr. Springer says he could hold it for her until Saturday. Hazel will hold a fund-raising party that night to get enough money to buy the organ. Meanwhile, Barbara sees a piano she would really like to have. Fred tells Steve he got a promotion and a bonus. Fred invites Steve and Barbara out for the evening. Steve claims he's really tired. Hazel's fund-raising party causes a rift between the Baxters and Fred and Mona, who think they were snubbed. To make Mona fell better, Fred tells her to take his bonus money and put a down payment on the fur she's wanted. To get back at Barbara, instead of the fur, Mona buys the piano that Barbara wanted. Hazel speaks with Clara (Alice Backes), the Williams maid, about a desk that Mona needs to get rid of. The desk begins some wheeling and dealing that Hazel does and she almost gets enough money to buy the organ. Fred asks Steve about the party and finds out it was Hazel's party. A little more bargaining with an Antique Dealer and Hazel has enough money for the organ.
| 143 | 18 | "Boom or Bust" | E.W. Swackhamer | Louella MacFarlane | January 24, 1966 |
Fearing future bills and business being slow, Steve puts the family on a tight budget. Steve has also put in for a loan at the bank. Banker Mr. Purcell tells his assistant to put it through. Cliff (Roy Stuart) comes by Steve's office. A car that Steve wanted had just arrived. Steve says that he can't buy the car at this time. Meanwhile, Mrs. Purcell (Viola Harris) comes to see Barbara. Mrs. Purcell would like Barbara to sell some tickets for her charity. Barbara needs to write a check for the tickets. Due to some misunderstandings, Mr. Purcell mistakes Steve's thrift for poor credit status. Hazel finds a way to sell Barbara's tickets and it involves giving away some of her brownies. Steve finally has a big sale and tells the family they're off the budget. Thanks to Hazel, Steve gets his loan. Walter Mathews as Pawnbroker.
| 144 | 19 | "Harold's Gift Horses" | Charles Barton | Robert Riley Crutcher | January 31, 1966 |
Steve catches Susie playing pirate with a real sword. When he asks Barbara and Hazel where Susie got the sword, they have no idea. They learn from Harold that Steve's spinster client Laura Kirkland gave it to him. Laura also gave him a stop watch. Laura stops by and wants to take Harold out to lunch and then a movie. Later, bachelor client J.B. Turner comes by about a land deal. Harold comes home riding a motorized scooter. Turner and Steve think Laura is trying to buy Harold's affection. Steve makes Harold return the scooter. Turner wants to outdo her by teaching Harold how to get along in a man's world. Turner also spoils Harold with gifts. Steve wants to tell Turner and Laura to stop, but he doesn't want to offend them. When Laura and Turner want to take Harold out on the same day, they put Steve on the spot by having him choose between the two. Hazel comes up with an idea when Harold mentions something about the sword. Hazel gets the two get together when they find they have a mutual respect for Teddy Roosevelt.
| 145 | 20 | "How to Find Work Without Really Trying" | William D. Russell | Jack Sher | February 7, 1966 |
Rosie makes a surprise visit to Hazel. Hazel tells her she won a dinner for two at a plush restaurant, but Rosie has plans with her sister. Everyone else Hazel asks is busy and can't go. While walking through the park, Hazel meets Arthur Woods (Victor Jory), a stranger sitting on a park bench. She believes he is out of work and she invites him to go to dinner with her. Steve and Barbara are worried about Hazel going to dinner with a stranger. At the restaurant, the Maitre d' (Maurice Marsac) gives Hazel and Arthur a table in front of the kitchen. Arthur finds this unacceptable and makes the Maitre d' find them a better table. Arthur shows a remarkable sophistication in choosing the meal and the wine. Hazel keeps suggesting that he get a job. He tells Hazel that he has lost any desire to work since his wife passed away. The next night, Steve and Barbara are out and Hazel has Arthur over for dinner. Steve and Barbara come home and meet Arthur. Things get awkward when Hazel mentions a job in real estate. When Arthur comes to Steve's office, Steve thinks he's there for a job. Arthur actually wants to buy a lot Steve has for sale. It turns out that he's a retired builder and because of Hazel, he finds he would enjoy working again.
| 146 | 21 | "My Son, the Sheepdog" | William D. Russell | Jane Klove & Ted Sherdeman | February 14, 1966 |
Harold and Jeff Williams let their hair grow when they organize their rock and roll band, The Leaping Lizards. They hope to win a local talent contest on TV. Barbara and Mona are concerned, but Steve and Fred say it's just a phase they're going through. Steve says that once they lose the contest, they'll go back to being normal people again. The Leaping Lizards win the contest and start getting jobs all over town. When Steve is worried about Harold tying up the phone, Harold suggests he get his own phone. Girls want the boys autograph's. Steve, Barbara, Fred, Mona and Hazel change their hair and wear wild clothes hoping the boys will see how silly they look. Hazel rents a motorcycle for Steve. But all the dancing and acting silly is wearing the old folks out. The folks tell Harold and Jeff that they're going to be in the PTA show. This goes on for a couple days. The plan eventually works and the boys quit the band and get their hair cut.
| 147 | 22 | "Please Don't Shout" | William D. Russell | Teleplay By; Robert Riley Crutcher; Story By; Robert Riley Crutcher & James Fonda | February 21, 1966 |
It's Friday night and Hazel expects to play poker with Steve and his friends. Steve makes an excuse why there won't be a game. Steve tells Barbara that the guys are actually playing at Harvey's house because they don't want Hazel playing. The guys don't like the way Hazel talks all night, she tells the guys how to play their cards and she always wins. Harvey's house is located next to a busy and noisy highway. The noise gets to be too much and Steve suggests moving the game to his house. Hazel tells Steve she won't be able to play because she started cleaning out the kitchen cabinets. Harvey mentions that his wife moved in with her sister because of the noise. Steve gets upset when Barbara invites Harvey to stay the night. Steve gets out of it when Harvey decides to stay with Fred. Barbara and Hazel suggest Steve try to sell Harvey's house for him. Steve doesn't think there is any way he can find someone to buy the house. Harvey overhears Mona complaining about Fred bringing him over and goes back to Steve's house. The next morning, Harvey overhears Steve complaining about him being there. Hazel comes up with a solution. She gets Steve to find the perfect couple to buy the house. Mr. (Jess Kirkpatrick) and Mrs. Hobart (Barbara Luddy) are hard of hearing. Emil Sitka as Mr. Miller.
| 148 | 23 | "But Is It Art?" | William D. Russell | John McGreevey | February 28, 1966 |
After Hazel finds a bargain in material for curtains, Barbara thinks that Hazel's room should be repainted. Barbara talks a reluctant Steve into it. Later, Barbara and Steve are having lunch at a restaurant with Deirdre. They were to meet eccentric artist Milwaukee Ames (Claude Akins). Deirdre hopes to commission Ames to do a portrait of her. Ames is late and Steve calls him up. Ames will stop by the house later. Hazel mistakes Ames for the man she hired to come and paint her room. Deirdre, Steve and Barbara mistake Ralph Pankhurst, the house painter, for the famous artist. Milwaukee wants Hazel to model for him and Hazel is confused. The mix-up gets resolved. Milwaukee agrees to do a portrait of Deirdre because he needs the money. Hazel didn't like Ralph's vision for her room. Hazel agrees to model for Ames and he will paint her room as payment. When Deirdre unveils her portrait at the Baxter's, everyone is more interested in Hazel's room.
| 149 | 24 | "Who Can Afford a Bargain?" | William D. Russell | Jack Sher | March 7, 1966 |
Mona would like to move to a larger home. Steve has a listing in a very classy neighborhood, but it's expensive. Hazel can tell Fred is reluctant to even consider it. Steve shows the house to Mona and Barbara and Mona loves it. Meanwhile, the kids bring home their report cards from school. Susie got all A's, but Harold didn't do as well. Hazel tries to encourage Harold to do better. Mona shows Fred the house. She tries to talk him into buying the house and they wind up in a big fight. The next day Fred goes to see Steve at home, but Steve has already left for the office. Fred has to make an out of town business trip. Against his better judgement, Fred puts a deposit on the house. He gives Hazel a check to give to Steve. Hazel tries to talk Steve out of selling the house to Fred. She then gives him Fred's check. Just then Bill Fox brings in another couple, Mr. and Mrs. Sherell (Ann Ayars), that want the house. Steve now has to turn them down, even though they offered more money. Hazel finds a way to convince Mona that they can't afford the house and it involves having money for college.
| 150 | 25 | "Hazel's Free Enterprise" | William D. Russell | Jane Klove & Ted Sherdeman | March 14, 1966 |
Barbara tells Hazel that she put a deposit on a pool table for Steve's birthday. The problem is she needs another $200, which she doesn't have. Hazel makes a deal with the Richey Supermarket Chain to sell her chili sauce through them. Mr. Richey (Ed Prentiss) wants to call it "Aunt Hazel's Chili Sauce". Mona notices the grocery trucks dropping off food to the Baxter's. She tells Fred Steve must be throwing a large dinner party and they weren't invited. Hazel and Barbara set up a makeshift factory in the kitchen. Steve thinks they're doing it for fun. Mona learns about the chili sauce. Fred and Mona think they are making it because Steve is down on his luck. Fred offers to lend Steve some money to tide him over. A confused Steve turns him down. Mr. Moore (Byron Foulger), a health inspector, stops by the house. He informs them that the house is not zoned for a commercial food business. Steve now knows Hazel was selling the sauce. Hazel sells the recipe to Mr. Richey and Barbara can now buy the pool table. Steve and Fred find out that Hazel is quite an excellent pool player.
| 151 | 26 | "Bee in Her Bonnet" | Hal Cooper | Robert Riley Crutcher | March 21, 1966 |
Hazel reads trouble in Steve's tea leaves. Steve gets a call from Mrs. Fillmore (Kathryn Givney) about some real estate she wants to sell. She wants Steve to come see her right away. Meanwhile, a man named Hogan (Guy Raymond) is sampling much of beekeeper Muntz's (Harry Harvey Sr.) honey. Hogan doesn't buy anything and drives off, which irritates Muntz. Bees in Hogan's car cause him to crash into a tree. Steve drives by and stops to help. Hazel prediction of trouble comes true when Hogan insists Steve drive him to a hospital and then to his doctor. Steve is now late to see Mrs. Fillmore. Steve, not being able to get rid of Hogan, reluctantly brings him back to the house. Steve calls Mrs. Fillmore about why he didn't show up. She is impressed with what she believes was Steve's good deed. She wants Steve to handle her property. Because of something Hazel says, Hogan, making up a story that Steve ran him off the road, threatens to sue. Now Mrs. Fillmore does not know whom to believe. Steve and Hazel go to see Muntz, but Muntz does not want to get involved. Thanks to something Hazel says, Muntz does back up Steve's story to Mrs. Fillmore. Hogan's lies are revealed and Steve still gets the deal with Mrs. Fillmore.
| 152 | 27 | "The Perfect Boss" | William D. Russell | John McGreevey | March 28, 1966 |
Steve knows Barbara wants something because she is being extra nice to him. Turns out there's a new hat she wants and it isn't cheap. Hazel wants to write an essay about Steve for a "The Perfect Boss" contest. Steve is against the idea and tells Hazel to not enter. Barbara teases Steve saying he's just afraid that there are other bosses that are more perfect. At Steve's office, Fred shows Millie flowers that he's going to give his maid Clara (Alice Backes). Fred tells Steve that he's encouraging Clara to enter "The Perfect Boss" contest. Now Steve tells Hazel to enter. Mona tells Steve that because of Fred catering to Clara, she is shirking her duties. Steve and Fred then try to outdo each other in influencing their respective maids. Hazel has her essay already written, but she tells Steve she's not turning it in. She says that she doesn't like the way Steve has changed by trying to be the best boss. Steve apologizes and says he'll go back to the way he was. Hazel enters the contest and wins.
| 153 | 28 | "A Little Bit of Genius" | William D. Russell | Jane Klove & Ted Sherdeman | April 4, 1966 |
Harold tells Hazel that his friend Jeff was put in an advanced class at school. Harold's a little depressed that he might lose Jeff as a friend. Hazel tries to cheer him up, but it doesn't work. Steve thinks it will pass. Hazel helps Harold find a new hobby, flying gas powered model airplanes. Harold's next report card isn't very good. Steve tries to help Harold with his math, but even Steve is confused. Meanwhile, Jeff is developing a superior attitude. He thinks his father Fred should go to night school to improve his mind instead of playing pool with Steve all the time. Fred tells Steve and Barbara what Jeff said. Hazel and Harold are outside playing with his model plane. Jeff comes by and is not impressed. Hazel hopes to bring Jeff back down to Earth. She gets Fred to fly the plane with Harold. Jeff now wants his father to fly planes with him and he apologizes for being obnoxious. Jeff and Harold are at a model plane competition. Jeff is having trouble getting his plane started. Hazel gets Harold to help Jeff and the boys become friends again.
| 154 | 29 | "A Question of Ethics" | William D. Russell | Teleplay by Robert Riley Crutcher; Story by Louella MacFarlane | April 11, 1966 |
Millie's friend Ted calls the office. He wants to see Millie and he called to make sure Steve wasn't there. Hazel's friends, the Johanssons (Alice Frost & John Qualen), come by for a visit. They want to travel, so they're going to sell their farm. Hazel thinks that Steve could get them more money for their farm than their current realtor, Mr. Joe Ryan (Bill Zuckert). When they go to see him, Joe gets upset because he tells the Johanssons the buyer is in the other room. Steve comes by his office and is not happy when he finds Ted there. Joe arrives and says he wants to have the real estate association have a hearing into Steve stealing his clients. Steve doesn't know what Joe is talking about. What Steve also doesn't know is that the Johanssons are in his private office. Joe sees the Johanssons and gets even more upset. Hazel gets Steve off the hook with Mr. McComber (Willis Bouchey), the president of the real estate association. Steve tells the Johanssons it wouldn't be ethical for him to take their listing. He also says that the price Joe was going to get was a good one. When Hazel brings the Johanssons to Mr. Ryan's office, he says he is no longer interested in selling their farm. Hazel manages to talk Mr. McComber into buying the farm.
