= Bobby Buntrock =

American actor (1952–1974)

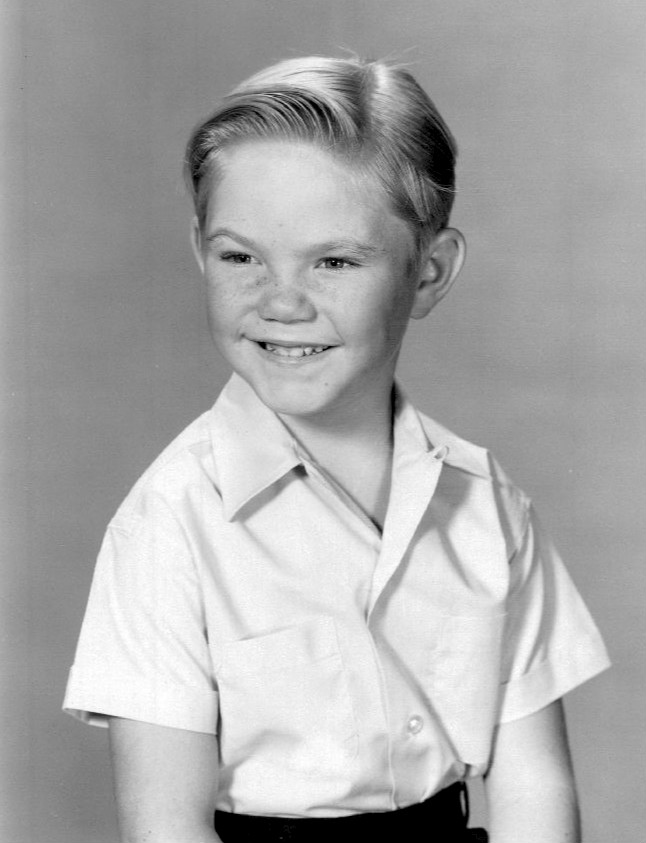
- Buntrock as Harold Baxter c. 1960s
- Born: Robert Willard Buntrock; August 4, 1952; Denver, Colorado, U.S.
- Died: April 7, 1974 (aged 21); Keystone, South Dakota, U.S.
- Resting place: Keystone Cemetery
- Education: Sturgis High School
- Occupation: Actor
- Years active: 1959–1967

Robert Willard "Bobby" Buntrock (August 4, 1952 – April 7, 1974) was an American child actor. Buntrock was widely known for his role as Harold "Sport" Baxter on the 1960s sitcom Hazel.

== Career ==
Buntrock was born in Denver, Colorado, to Robert E. Buntrock and Maxine Buntrock. He had two sisters, Stella and Deanne. When he was three, the family moved to Whittier, California, where neighbours urged Buntrock's parents to get their son into acting. After submitting Buntrock's picture to various agents, he was signed by Marcella Belle Rinehart. When he was seven years old, Buntrock landed his first role, on an episode of Wagon Train. Early in 1959 in a show starring Bette Davis, he played one of seven children in The Ella Lindstrom Story which aired on Feb 4 1959. He also appeared in guest spots on Westinghouse Desilu Playhouse, Mister Ed, and The Donna Reed Show. He also did the early 1960s commercials for Rock 'Em Sock 'Em Robots.

In 1961, Buntrock won the role of Harold "Sport" Baxter on the sitcom Hazel, starring Shirley Booth. The series aired for five seasons, first on NBC with Don DeFore and Whitney Blake in the role of Harold's parents, George and Dorothy Baxter. In the fifth and final season (1965–1966) shown on CBS, the series was retooled after DeFore and Blake were dismissed and Harold lived with his Uncle Steve Baxter (Ray Fulmer), Aunt Barbara (Lynn Borden), and Cousin Susie (Julia Benjamin). During the run of Hazel, Buntrock was tutored on the set and attended Lake Marie Public School in Whittier when the show was on hiatus.

After Hazel ended its run in 1966, Buntrock appeared in two guest spots on The Virginian in 1967 after which he retired from acting.

== Personal life and death ==
Buntrock moved with his family to Keystone, South Dakota, where he graduated from Sturgis Brown High School in 1970, and lived for the last five years of his life.

On April 7, 1974, Buntrock died at age 21 in an automobile accident when his car veered off a bridge under construction into Battle Creek, drowning him in the submerged car. He is buried in Keystone Cemetery in Keystone.

== Filmography ==
Year	Title	Role	Notes
1961	Death Valley Days	Frankie Clayton	Episode: “A Bullet for the D.A.”
1959	Wagon Train	Bo Lindstrom	Episode: "The Ella Lindstrom Story"
1960	Westinghouse Desilu Playhouse	Buddy	Episode: "Dr. Kate"
1961	Mister Ed	Small boy	Episode: "Kiddy Park"
1961	The Donna Reed Show	Crying child	Episode: "Mary's Little Lambs"
1961	Bus Stop	Johnathon	Episode: "Afternoon of a Cowboy"
1961–1966	Hazel	Harold Baxter	154 episodes
1963	Burke's Law	Scout Hendricks	Episode: "Who Killed Eleanora Davis?"
1963	The Virginian	Various	2 episodes
1967	The Virginian	Tim Bates	Episode: “Doctor Pat”
1967	The Virginian	Tim Messinger	Episode: "The Masquerade", (final television appearance)
