= Shirley Booth =

American actress (1898–1992)

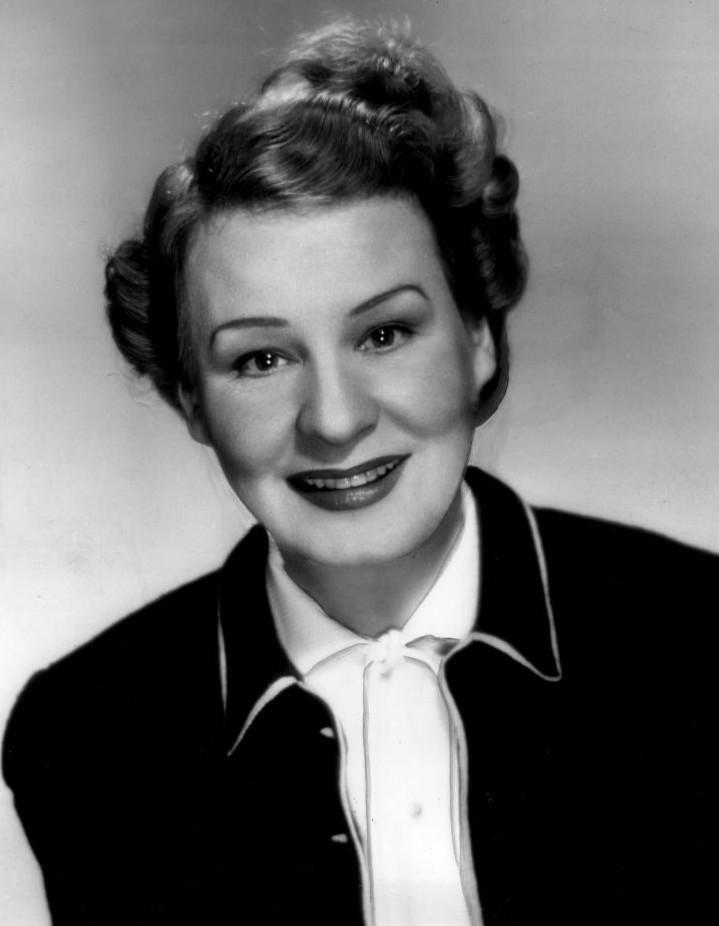
- Booth in 1950
- Born: Marjory Ford; August 30, 1898; Brooklyn, New York, U.S.
- Died: October 16, 1992 (aged 94); North Chatham, Massachusetts, U.S.
- Resting place: Mount Hebron Cemetery, Montclair, New Jersey
- Occupation: Actress
- Years active: 1915–1974
- Spouses: Ed Gardner (m. 1929; div. 1942) William H. Baker, Jr. (m. 1943; died 1951)

Shirley Booth (born Marjory Ford; August 30, 1898 – October 16, 1992) was an American actress. One of 24 performers to achieve the Triple Crown of Acting, Booth was the recipient of an Academy Award, two Primetime Emmy Awards, and three Tony Awards.

Primarily a theater actress, Booth began her career on Broadway in 1915. Her most significant success was as Lola Delaney, in the drama Come Back, Little Sheba, for which she received her second Tony Award in 1950 (she would go on to win three). She made her film debut, reprising her role in the 1952 film version, for which she won the Academy Award for Best Actress and the Golden Globe Award for Best Actress for her performance. Despite her successful entry into films, she preferred acting on the stage, and made only four more films.

From 1961 to 1966, Booth played the title role in the sitcom Hazel, for which she won two Primetime Emmy Awards. She was acclaimed for her performance in the 1966 television production of The Glass Menagerie. Her final role was providing the voice of Mrs. Claus in the 1974 animated Christmas television special The Year Without a Santa Claus.

== Early life ==
Booth was born Marjory Ford in New York City, according to her birth certificate to Albert James and Virginia M. (née Wright) Ford. In the 1900 New York state census, she was listed as Thelma Booth Ford. She had one sibling, a younger sister, Jean. Her early childhood was spent in Flatbush, Brooklyn, where she attended Public School 152.

When she was age 7, Booth's family moved to Philadelphia, where she first became interested in acting after seeing a stage performance. When Booth was a teenager, her family moved to Hartford, Connecticut, where she became involved in summer stock. She made her stage debut in a production of Mother Carey's Chickens. Against her father's protests, she dropped out of school and traveled to New York City to pursue a career. She became a resident of the famed Rehearsal Club on West 53rd Street with other young theatrical hopefuls. She initially used the name Thelma Booth when her father forbade her to use the family name professionally. She eventually changed her name to Shirley Booth.

== Career ==
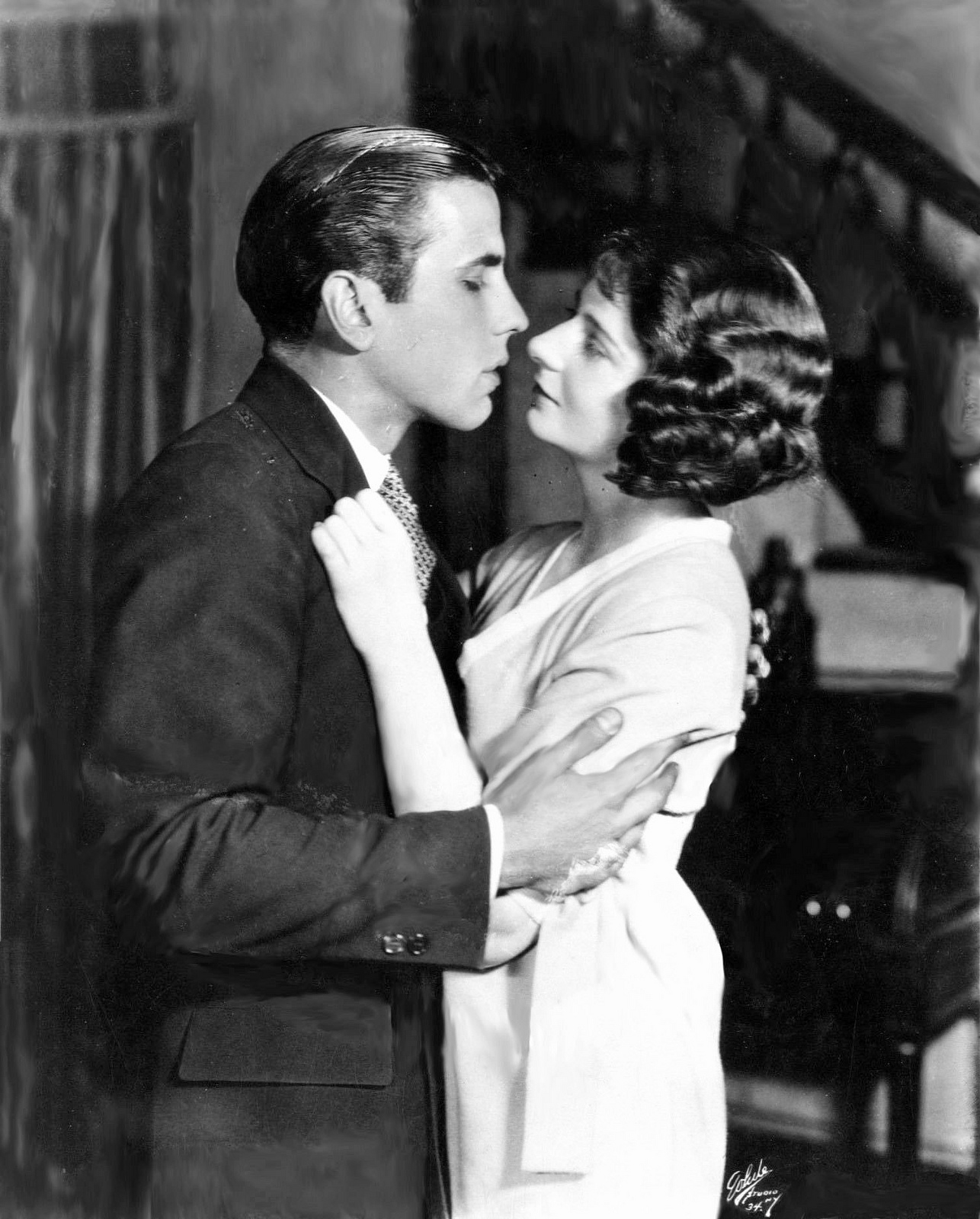
Humphrey Bogart and Booth in the original Broadway production of Hell's Bells (1925)

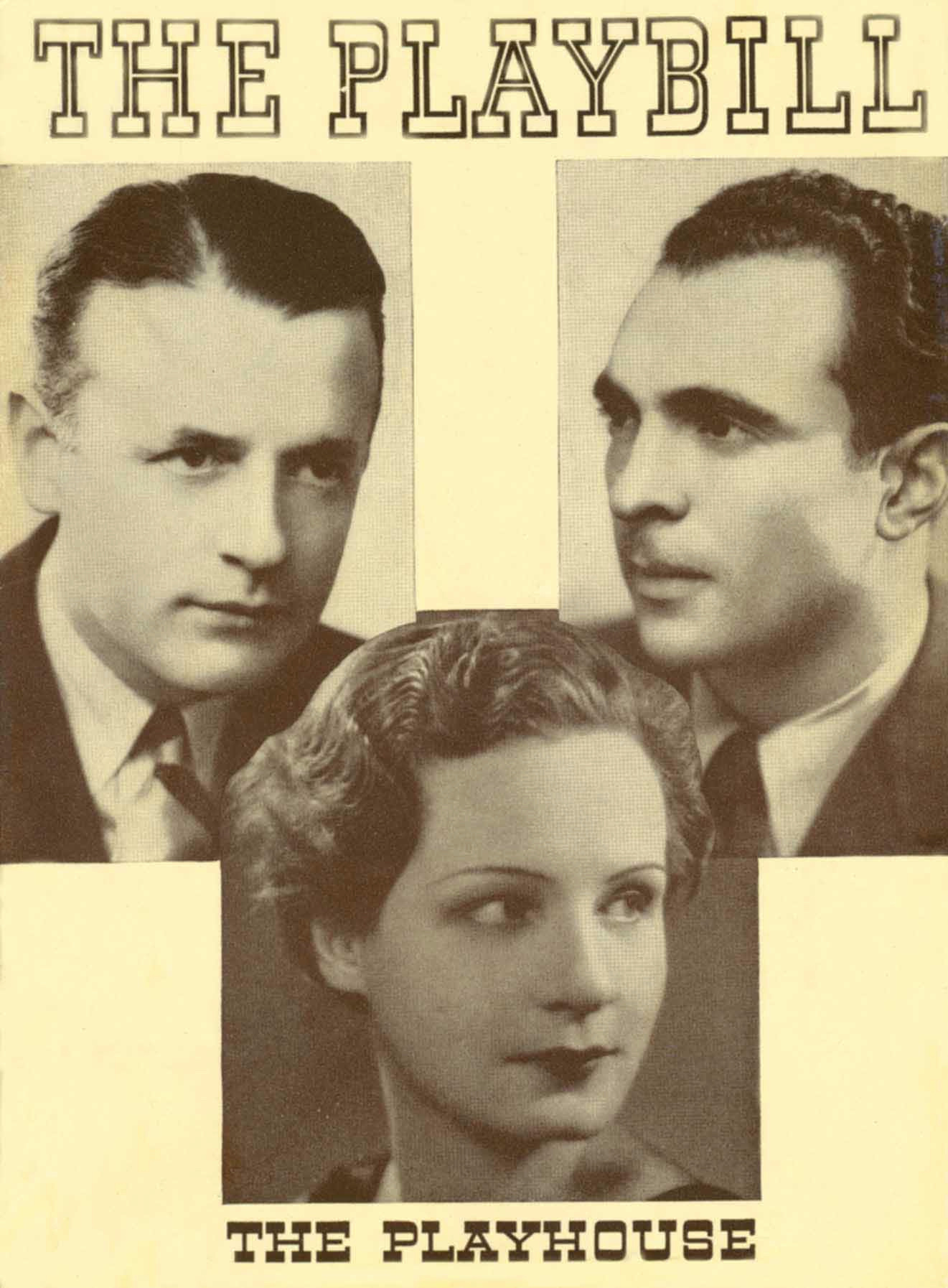
Playbill for the original production of Three Men on a Horse, starring Booth, William Lynn and Sam Levene (1935)

Booth began her stage career as a teenager, acting in stock company productions. She was a prominent actress in Pittsburgh theatre for a time, performing with the Sharp Company. Her debut on Broadway was in the play Hell's Bells, with Humphrey Bogart, on January 26, 1925. Booth first attracted major notice as the female lead in the comedy hit Three Men on a Horse, which ran from 1935 to 1937. During the 1930s and 1940s, she achieved popularity in dramas, comedies and later musicals. She acted with Katharine Hepburn in The Philadelphia Story (1939), originated the role of Ruth Sherwood in the 1940 Broadway production of My Sister Eileen, and performed with Ralph Bellamy in Tomorrow the World (1943). Booth also starred on the popular radio series Duffy's Tavern, playing the lighthearted, wisecracking, man-crazy daughter of the unseen tavern owner on CBS radio from 1941 to 1942 and on NBC Blue from 1942 to 1943. Her then-husband, Ed Gardner, created and wrote the show as well as played its lead character Archie, the manager of the tavern; Booth left the show after the couple divorced. She auditioned unsuccessfully for the title role of Our Miss Brooks in 1948; she had been recommended by Harry Ackerman, who was to produce the show, but Ackerman told radio historian Gerald Nachman that he felt Booth was too conscious of a high school teacher's struggles to have full fun with the character's comic possibilities. Our Miss Brooks became a radio and television hit when the title role went to Eve Arden. In the summer of 1949, Booth portrayed Phyllis Hogan in the situation comedy Hogan's Daughter on NBC radio.

Booth received her first Tony Award, for Best Supporting or Featured Actress (Dramatic), for her performance as Grace Woods in Goodbye, My Fancy (1948). Her second Tony was for Best Actress in a Play, which she received for her widely acclaimed performance as the tortured wife Lola Delaney in the poignant drama Come Back, Little Sheba (1950). Sidney Blackmer received the Tony for Best Actor in a Play for his performance as her husband Doc.

Her success in Come Back, Little Sheba was followed by the musical A Tree Grows in Brooklyn (1951), based on the popular novel, in which she played the feisty, but lovable Aunt Sissy, which proved to be another major hit. Her popularity was such that, at the time, the story was skewed from the original so that Aunt Sissy was the leading role (rather than Francie). Booth then went to Hollywood and reprised her stage role in the 1952 film version of Come Back, Little Sheba with Burt Lancaster playing Doc. After that movie was completed — her first of only five films in her career — she returned to New York and played Leona Samish in Arthur Laurents' play The Time of the Cuckoo (1952) on Broadway.

Booth received the Academy Award for Best Actress in a Leading Role for her performance in Come Back, Little Sheba, becoming the first actress ever to win both a Tony and an Oscar for the same role. The film also earned Booth Best Actress awards from The Cannes Film Festival, the Golden Globe Awards, the New York Film Critics Circle Awards, and National Board of Review. She received her third Tony, her second in the Best Actress in a Play category, for her performance in The Time of the Cuckoo.

Booth was age 54 when she made her first movie, but she had successfully shaved almost a decade off her real age, with her publicity stating 1907 as the year of her birth. Her correct year of birth was known by only her closest associates, until her correct year of birth, 1898, was announced at the time of her death. Her second starring film, About Mrs. Leslie, a romantic drama opposite Robert Ryan, was released in 1954 to good reviews, but was poorly received by audiences. In 1953, Booth had made a cameo appearance as herself in the all-star comedy/drama movie Main Street to Broadway. She spent the next few years commuting between New York and California. On Broadway, she scored personal successes in the musical By the Beautiful Sea (1954) and the comedy Desk Set (1955). Although Booth had become well known to moviegoers during this period, the movie roles for The Time of the Cuckoo (re-titled as Summertime for the film in 1955) and Desk Set (1957) both went to Katharine Hepburn.

In 1957, Booth won the Sarah Siddons Award for her work on the stage in Chicago. She returned to the Broadway stage in 1959, starring as the long-suffering title character in Marc Blitzstein's musical Juno, an adaptation of Seán O'Casey's 1924 play Juno and the Paycock. In 1961, director Frank Capra approached Booth about starring in Pocketful of Miracles, an updated version of Capra's 1933 comedy-drama Lady for a Day starring May Robson. Booth informed him that she was unable to match Robson's Oscar-nominated performance in the original film and declined the role. Capra instead cast Bette Davis, who was unfavorably compared to Robson by most reviewers when the film was released.

Booth starred in two more films for Paramount Pictures, playing Dolly Gallagher Levi in the 1958 film adaptation of Thornton Wilder's romance/comedy The Matchmaker (the source text for the musical Hello, Dolly!), and to play Alma Duval in the drama Hot Spell (1958). For her performances in both films, Booth was nominated as the year's Best Actress by the New York Film Critics Circle.

=== Hazel ===
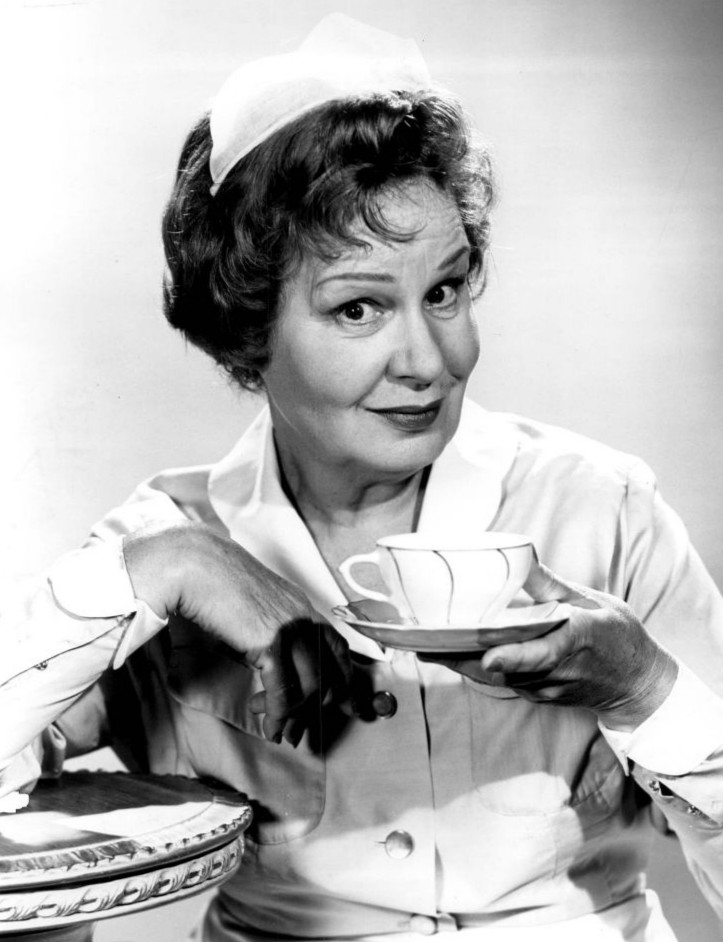
Shirley Booth as Hazel, 1962

In 1961, Booth was cast in the title role on the sitcom Hazel, based on Ted Key's popular single-panel cartoon from the Saturday Evening Post about the domineering yet endearing housemaid named Hazel Burke who works for the Baxter family. The series also starred Don DeFore as George Baxter, Whitney Blake as Dorothy "Missy" Baxter, and Bobby Buntrock as the Baxters' young son Harold. Upon its premiere, Hazel was an immediate hit with audiences and drew high ratings.

In 1963, Booth told the Associated Press at the height of Hazel's popularity,

I liked playing Hazel the first time I read one of the scripts, and I could see all the possibilities of the character—the comedy would take care of itself. My job was to give her heart. Hazel never bores me. Besides, she's my insurance policy.

Over the course of its five-year run, Booth won two Primetime Emmy Awards for her work in the series and was nominated for a third. Booth is one of the few performers to win all three major entertainment awards (Oscar, Tony, Emmy).

In 1965, NBC canceled the series. CBS picked up and retooled the series; Don DeFore (George Baxter) and Whitney Blake (Dorothy Baxter) were written out of the series, while Bobby Buntrock (Harold "Sport" Baxter) remained a cast member. Ray Fulmer was cast as Steve Baxter, the brother of DeFore's character George. Booth, who owned the rights to the series, hired Lynn Borden, a former Miss Arizona, as Steve's wife Barbara. Julia Benjamin was cast as Barbara and Steve's daughter Susie. In the retooled version, George and Dorothy Baxter have moved to Baghdad, leaving Harold to live with Steve and Barbara. Hazel remains on as the new Baxters' housekeeper. While ratings for the fifth season were still strong (Hazel ranked number 26 for the season), Booth decided to end the show due to health problems.

=== Later career and retirement ===
Shortly after the end of Hazel, Booth appeared in the television production of The Glass Menagerie that aired on the anthology series CBS Playhouse. She won critical acclaim for her performance and was nominated for another Primetime Emmy Award. In the summer of 1968 she appeared at the historic Elitch Theatre in a production of Desk Set with her Hazel co-star, Ray Fulmer.

Booth's final Broadway appearances were in a revival of Noël Coward's play Hay Fever and the musical Look to the Lilies, both in 1970. In 1971, she returned to Chicago to star with Gig Young in a revival of Harvey at the Blackstone Theater. In 1973, Booth returned to episodic television in the ABC series A Touch of Grace. The series was based on the British sitcom For the Love of Ada. A Touch of Grace was canceled after one season.

In 1974, Booth provided the voice for the character of Mrs. Claus in the animated television special The Year Without a Santa Claus. It was Booth's final acting role after which she retired to her home in Cape Cod, Massachusetts.

== Personal life ==
On November 23, 1929, Booth married Ed Gardner, who later gained fame as the creator and host of the radio series Duffy's Tavern, with Booth originating the role of man-hungry Miss Duffy in the series. They divorced in 1942. She married William H. Baker Jr., a corporal in the U.S. Army, the following year. Booth and Baker remained married until his death from heart disease in 1951. Booth never remarried and had no children from either marriage.

For her contributions to the film industry, Booth has a motion pictures star on the Hollywood Walk of Fame at 6850 Hollywood Boulevard.

After retiring from acting in 1974, Booth moved to North Chatham, Massachusetts, where she lived with her pet poodle and two cats. She maintained contact with her friends via telephone and spent her time painting and doing needlework. In November 1979, she was inducted into the American Theatre Hall of Fame. Booth did not attend the ceremony, and the award was accepted on her behalf by Celeste Holm.

== Death ==
By 1976, Booth's health began to decline. She reportedly suffered a stroke that caused mobility issues and blindness. After her death, Booth's sister said she had broken her hip in 1979, which restricted her mobility. On October 16, 1992, Booth died at the age of 94 at her home in North Chatham. After a private memorial service, Booth was interred in the Baker family plot in Mount Hebron Cemetery in Montclair, New Jersey.

== Filmography ==
=== Film ===
Year	Title	Role	Notes
1952	Come Back, Little Sheba	Lola Delaney	Academy Award for Best Actress; Cannes Film Festival Award for Special Mention; Golden Globe Award for Best Actress in a Motion Picture – Drama; National Board of Review Award for Best Actress; New York Film Critics Circle Award for Best Actress; Nominated – BAFTA Award for Best Foreign Actress
1953	Main Street to Broadway	Herself	
1954	About Mrs. Leslie	Mrs. Vivien Leslie	Nominated – BAFTA Award for Best Foreign Actress
1958	Hot Spell	Alma Duval	Nominated – New York Film Critics Circle Award for Best Actress
1958	The Matchmaker	Dolly 'Gallagher' Levi	Nominated – New York Film Critics Circle Award for Best Actress

=== Television ===
Year	Title	Role	Notes
1954–1961	The United States Steel Hour		2 Episodes
1957	Playhouse 90	Perle Mesta	Episode: "The Hostess with the Mostess"
1961–1966	Hazel	Hazel Burke	154 Episodes; Primetime Emmy Award for Outstanding Continued Performance by an Actress in a Series (Lead) (1962–1963); Nominated – Golden Globe Award for Best Television Star – Female (1964); Nominated – Primetime Emmy Award for Outstanding Continued Performance by an Actress in a Series (Lead) (1964)
1966	CBS Playhouse	Amanda Wingfield	Episode: "The Glass Menagerie"; Nominated – Primetime Emmy Award for Outstanding Single Performance by an Actress in a Leading Role in a Drama
1967	CBS Playhouse	Heloise Michaud	Episode: "Do Not Go Gentle into That Good Night"
1968	The Smugglers	Mrs. Hudson	TV movie
1969	The Ghost & Mrs. Muir	Spiritualist Madame Tibaldi	Episode: "Medium Well Done"
1973	A Touch of Grace	Grace Simpson	13 Episodes
1974	The Year Without a Santa Claus	Mrs. Claus (voice)	TV movie

=== Theatre ===
Date	Production	Role	Notes
January 26 – May 1925	Hell's Bells	Nan Winchester	
November 2, 1925 – June 1926	Laff That Off	Peggy Bryant	
October 7 – October 1926	Buy, Buy Baby	Betty Hamilton	
October 6 – October 1927	High Gear	Mary Marshall	
September 24 – December 1928	The War Song	Emily Rosen	
April 21 – April 1931	School for Virtue	Marg	
October 2 – October 1931	The Camels are Coming	Bobby Marchante	
November 30, 1931 – January 1932	Coastwise	Annie Duval	
May 8 – June 1933	The Mask and the Face	Elisa Zanotti	Revival
February 7 – February 1934	After Such Pleasures		
January 30, 1935 – January 9, 1937	Three Men on a Horse	Mabel	
April 9 – July 1937	Excursion	Mrs. Loschavio	
November 15 – November 1937	Too Many Heroes	Carrie Nolan	
March 28, 1939 – March 30, 1940	The Philadelphia Story	Elizabeth Imbrie	
December 26, 1940 – January 16, 1943	My Sister Eileen	Ruth Sherwood	
April 14, 1943 – June 17, 1944	Tomorrow the World	Leona Richards	
May 31 – July 14, 1945	Hollywood Pinafore	Louhedda Hopsons	
December 11–14, 1946	Land's End	Susan Pengilly	
January 16–17, 1948	The Men We Marry	Maggie Welch	
November 17 – December 24, 1949	Goodbye, My Fancy	Grace Woods	Tony Award for Best Featured Actress in a Play
November 7–19, 1949	Love Me Long	Abby Quinn	
February 15 – July 29, 1950	Come Back, Little Sheba	Lola	Tony Award for Best Actress in a Play
April 19 – December 8, 1951	A Tree Grows in Brooklyn	Cissy	
October 15, 1952 – May 30, 1953	The Time of the Cuckoo	Leona Samish	Tony Award for Best Actress in a Play
April 8 – November 27, 1954	By the Beautiful Sea	Lottie Gibson	
October 24, 1955 – July 5, 1956	Desk Set	Bunny Watson	
December 26, 1957 – February 8, 1958	Miss Isobel	Mrs. Ackroyd	
March 9–21, 1959	Juno	Juno Boyle	
April 13 – May 7, 1960	A Second String	Fanny	
March 29 – April 18, 1970	Look to the Lilies	Mother Maria	
November 9–28, 1970	Hay Fever	Judith Bliss	Revival

== Awards and nominations ==
Year	Award	Category	Nominated work	Results	Ref.
1952	Academy Awards	Best Actress	Come Back, Little Sheba	Won	
1953	British Academy Film Awards	Best Foreign Actress	Come Back, Little Sheba	Nominated	
1954	British Academy Film Awards	Best Foreign Actress	About Mrs. Leslie	Nominated	
1953	Cannes Film Festival	Special Mention Award	Come Back, Little Sheba	Won	
1952	Golden Globe Awards	Best Actress in a Motion Picture – Drama	Come Back, Little Sheba	Won	
1963	Golden Globe Awards	Best Television Star – Female	Hazel	Nominated	
1954	Hasty Pudding Theatricals	Woman of the Year	—N/a	Won	
1954	Jussi Awards	Best Foreign Actress	Come Back, Little Sheba	Won	
1952	National Board of Review Awards	Best Actress	Come Back, Little Sheba	Won	
1952	New York Film Critics Circle Awards	Best Actress	Come Back, Little Sheba	Won	
1958	New York Film Critics Circle Awards	Best Actress	Hot Spell and The Matchmaker	Nominated	
1962	Primetime Emmy Awards	Outstanding Continued Performance by an Actress in a Series (Lead)	Hazel	Won	
1963	Primetime Emmy Awards	Outstanding Continued Performance by an Actress in a Series (Lead)	Hazel	Won	
1964	Primetime Emmy Awards	Outstanding Continued Performance by an Actress in a Series (Lead)	Hazel	Nominated	
1967	Primetime Emmy Awards	Outstanding Single Performance by an Actress in a Leading Role in a Drama	CBS Playhouse (Episode: "The Glass Menagerie")	Nominated	
1949	Tony Awards	Best Supporting or Featured Actress in a Play	Goodbye, My Fancy	Won	
1950	Tony Awards	Best Actress in a Play	Come Back, Little Sheba	Won	
1953	Tony Awards	Distinguished Dramatic Actress	The Time of the Cuckoo	Won	

== See also ==
- List of actors with Academy Award nominations
- Triple Crown of Acting

== Bibliography ==
- Tucker, David C. (2008). Shirley Booth: A Biography and Career Record. Jefferson, NC: McFarland. ISBN 978-0-7864-3600-2.
- Manago, Jim; Manago, Donna (2008). Love is the Reason for It All: The Shirley Booth Story. Albany, GA: BearManorMedia. ISBN 978-1-59393-146-9.
- Manago, Jim (2010). For Bill His Pinup Girl: The Shirley Booth & Bill Baker Story. U.S.: Jim & Donna Manago Books. ISBN 978-0-615-42181-0.
