= Movies with Manings =

- Genre: Film presentation
- Presented by: Allan Manings
- Country of origin: Canada
- Original language: English
- No. of seasons: 1

Production
- Running time: 90 minutes

Original release
- Network: CBC Television
- Release: 3 October 1959 – 16 April 1960

Movies With Manings is a Canadian film presentation program that aired on CBC Television from 1959 to 1960.

== Premise ==
CBC broadcast feature movies prior to Hockey Night in Canada on Saturday evenings. Allan Manings provided introductions to these movies using a set which resembled a living room. Sometimes he was accompanied by guests such as Elwy Yost who later appeared with Manings on CBC's Flashback.

== Scheduling ==
This 90-minute series was broadcast Saturdays at 7:30 p.m. (Eastern) from 3 October 1959 to 16 April 1960.

== See also ==
- Great Movies
