= Hazel (comics) =

American comic strip by Ted Kay (1943–1993)

- The first collection of Ted Key's Hazel cartoons, published by E. P. Dutton in 1946, sold 500,000 copies.
- Author: Ted Key (1943–1993)
- Current status/schedule: Concluded daily strip; reprints from 1993–2018
- Launch date: (Sat. Evening Post) 1943 (syndication) June 16, 1969
- End date: September 29, 2018
- Syndicate(s): King Features Syndicate (1969–2018)
- Publisher: E. P. Dutton
- Genre(s): Humor, Gag-a-day

Hazel is a single-panel cartoon series by Ted Key about a live-in maid who works for a middle-class family. Launched in 1943, Hazel ended September 29, 2018.

== Publication history ==
The character of Hazel came to Key in 1943 in a dream. He drew it the next morning and sent to The Saturday Evening Post, where it quickly became a popular series.

Hazel ran weekly in The Saturday Evening Post until the magazine ceased publication in 1969, after which the cartoon was picked up for daily newspaper syndication by King Features Syndicate, starting on June 16, 1969. Key continued to draw Hazel until his retirement in 1993; he died in May 2008.

In 2008, King Features was reprinting Hazel panels in more than 50 newspapers.

== Characters ==
- Hazel, the live-in maid to the Baxter family, also serving as nanny to the children.
- George Baxter, ostensible head of the household.
- Dorothy Baxter, George's wife.
- Harold Baxter, the son of George and Dorothy.
- Katie Baxter, the Baxters' adopted younger child.
- Smiley the dog.
- Mostly the cat.
- Two Ton, another cat, named for its size.

In 2008, the cartoonist's son, Peter Key, talked about the origin of the character, "Like a lot of creative people, he kept a notepad near his bedside. He had a dream about a maid who took a message, but she screwed it up completely. When he looked at the idea the next day, he thought it was good and sold it to The Post."

Shortly afterward, the wry and bossy household maid was given the name Hazel, along with employment at the Baxter household. Peter Key recalled, "He picked the name Hazel out of the air, but there was an editor at The Post who had a sister named Hazel. She thought her brother came up with the name, and she didn’t speak to him for two years."

== Books ==
Key's cartoons were reprinted in a series of books, including Here's Hazel and All Hazel. The first in the series, Hazel, was published by E. P. Dutton in 1946, and sold 500,000 copies. Kirkus Reviews commented:

Cartoons from the next to last page of The Saturday Evening Post, in which Hazel, a slightly dimmed jewel of a domestic, puts her employers and their friends through their paces with no hesitation about taking the center of the stage. Joining in their games, their parties, their conversations, their arguments, court of appeal for household decisions, intimidating the unwary, demanding-and grabbing-her rights, Hazel is certainly the least inhibited person on paper today. You may start off disliking her and her omnipresence in the household, but sooner or later one of her cracks will get you—and you'll be sold.

== Television ==
Shirley Booth and Ted Key

Key adapted his cartoon series into the television show Hazel, starring Shirley Booth, who won two Emmy Awards portraying the titular maid. It ran from 1961 to 1965 on NBC; for its final 1965-66 season, the show switched to CBS.

== Awards ==
Key won the National Cartoonists Society's Newspaper Panel Cartoon Award for 1977 for Hazel.

== Sources ==
- Strickler, Dave. Syndicated Comic Strips and Artists, 1924-1995: The Complete Index. Cambria, California: Comics Access, 1995. ISBN 0-9700077-0-1
