= William Emerson (journalist) =

American journalist (1923–2009)

William Austin "Bill" Emerson Jr. (February 28, 1923 – August 25, 2009) was an American journalist who covered the Civil Rights Movement as Newsweek's first bureau chief assigned to cover the Southern United States and was later editor in chief of The Saturday Evening Post.

== Background ==
Emerson was born on February 28, 1923, in Charlotte, North Carolina and moved with his family to Atlanta. He attended Boys High School and North Fulton High School in Atlanta. He studied for two years at Davidson College.

== Career ==
Emerson enlisted in the United States Army and trained, in part, at Camp Ritchie among the Ritchie Boys. In War time, he served in the China Burma India Theater of World War II. After completing his military service, Emerson attended Harvard University. Following his graduation, he took a position in New York City with Collier's Magazine.

=== Newsweek ===
In 1953, the year before the U.S. Supreme Court issued its landmark decision in Brown v. Board of Education, Emerson was named by Newsweek as its first bureau chief responsible for covering the South. In that role, Emerson witnessed the "years of resistance and violence" that ensued following the end of segregation in public schools and the start of the fight for civil rights for African Americans. In that role, Emerson covered school integration battles across the South, including in such cities as New Orleans and Memphis, Tennessee, and provided his direct observations of a woman trying to take her child to school and encountering a crowd spitting and yelling at them. He wrote about Ku Klux Klan cross burnings in Florida and followed the Montgomery bus boycott that began in 1955 with the ascension of Martin Luther King Jr. as a leader in the movement.

Emerson went to the Mississippi home of William Faulkner, disregarding a sign that warned visitors to keep away, hoping that Faulkner would be willing to cooperate on a planned Newsweek cover article about the author. Emerson was first approached by a number of dogs and then by Faulkner himself, who "calmly told someone to get his shotgun".

=== Saturday Evening Post ===
In September 1963, the Curtis Publishing Company promoted Emerson from assistant managing editor to executive editor of The Saturday Evening Post. A few months later, he reworked the magazine's issue covering the John F. Kennedy assassination to include recollections by his predecessor Dwight D. Eisenhower and by Arthur M. Schlesinger Jr., with a cover portrait of Kennedy by Norman Rockwell, all completed to publish the issue on time. As part of the New Journalism of the 1960s, Emerson had articles from such non-traditional authors as James Meredith, who wrote about his experiences as the first African American student at the University of Mississippi.

He was promoted to editor-in-chief in 1965 and remained in the position until the magazine's demise in 1969. In announcing that the February 8, 1969, issue would be the magazine's last, Curtis executive Martin Ackerman singled out Emerson for praise, but stated that the magazine had lost $5 million in 1968 and would lose a projected $3 million in 1969. In a meeting with employees after the magazine's closure had been announced, Emerson thanked the staff for their professional work and promised "to stay here and see that everyone finds a job". At a March 1969 postmortem on the magazine's closing, Emerson stated that The Post "was a damn good vehicle for advertising" with competitive renewal rates and readership reports and expressed what The New York Times called "understandable bitterness" in wishing "that all the one-eyed critics will lose their other eye".

=== Later life ===
Emerson later joined the faculty of the University of South Carolina, where he taught journalism.

== Personal and death ==
Emerson married Lucy Kiser; they had five children. His wife died in 2005.

Emerson died age 86 on August 25, 2009, at his home in Atlanta following a stroke.
