= Don DeFore =

American actor (1913–1993)

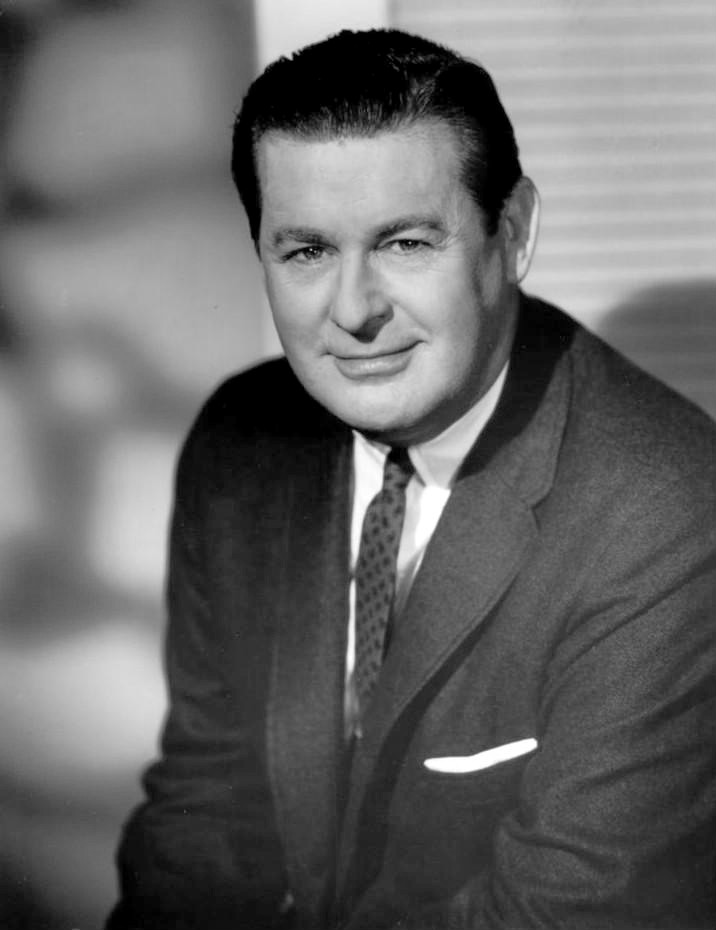
- DeFore in 1962
- Born: Donald John DeFore; August 25, 1913; Cedar Rapids, Iowa, U.S.
- Died: December 22, 1993 (aged 80); Santa Monica, California, U.S.
- Resting place: Pierce Brothers Westwood Village Memorial Park and Mortuary
- Education: University of Iowa
- Occupation: Actor
- Years active: 1936–1987
- Spouse: Marion Holmes (m. 1942)
- Children: 5

Donald John DeFore (August 25, 1913 – December 22, 1993) was an American actor. He is best known for his roles in the sitcom The Adventures of Ozzie and Harriet from 1952 to 1957 and the sitcom Hazel from 1961 to 1965, the former of which earned him a Primetime Emmy Award nomination.

== Early life ==
DeFore was one of seven children born in Cedar Rapids, Iowa, to Joseph Ervin DeFore, a railroad engineer for the Chicago and North Western Railroad and a local politician, and Albina Sylvia DeFore (née Nezerka).

After graduating from Washington High School in Cedar Rapids, DeFore attended the University of Iowa. He initially studied law while also playing basketball, track and baseball before becoming interested in acting. Since acting was not a major study at the university, he left and enrolled at the Pasadena Community Playhouse, where he won a scholarship and stayed for three years.

== Career ==
=== Acting ===
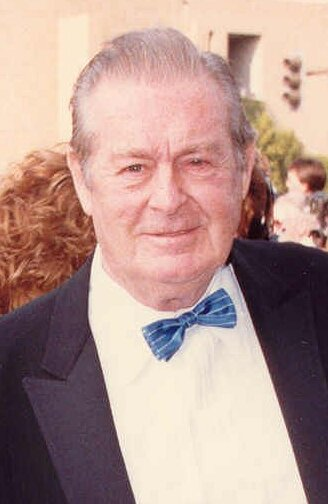
DeFore at the 1987 Emmy Awards

During this time, four fellow students and he wrote a play called Where Do We Go from Here? It was presented in a little theater in Hollywood with DeFore in the cast. As a young man, DeFore toured the country in stock companies for several years before making his Broadway debut in Where Do We Go from Here? in 1938, when Oscar Hammerstein II offered to take it to Broadway, and DeFore and five of the original cast members went along. The show ran for four weeks, and DeFore was soon recognized as a member of legitimate theater. He remained in New York and won a key role in The Male Animal, which ran for almost eight months on Broadway and eight months on the road.

In Hollywood, DeFore's first screen appearance was in a bit part in 1936's Reunion. By the early 1940s, he was appearing regularly in films such as: The Male Animal (1942), A Guy Named Joe (1943), Thirty Seconds Over Tokyo (1944), You Came Along (1945), Without Reservations (1946), It Happened on 5th Avenue (1947), Romance on the High Seas (1948), My Friend Irma (1949), and Jumping Jacks (1952). In 1946, exhibitors voted him the fourth-most promising "star of tomorrow".

DeFore also worked in radio, performing on such programs as Suspense, Old Gold Comedy Theater, and Lux Radio Theatre, but he is best known for his work in television. Beginning in 1952, DeFore had a recurring role as the Nelsons' friendly neighbor, "Thorny", on the ABC sitcom The Adventures of Ozzie and Harriet, earning a nomination in 1955 for a Best Supporting Actor in a Regular Series Primetime Emmy Award. In time, though, the role of Thorny was superseded by Lyle Talbot as Joe Randolph, and Mary Jane Croft as his wife Clara.

From 1954 to 1955, he served as president of the National Academy of Television Arts & Sciences. He was instrumental in arranging for the Emmy Awards to be broadcast on national television for the first time on March 7, 1955. He also served on the board of the Screen Actors Guild.

From 1961 to 1965, DeFore was a co-star of the television series Hazel as George Baxter, employer of the spirited, domineering housekeeper Hazel Burke, played by Shirley Booth and based on the cartoon character appearing in The Saturday Evening Post. DeFore was not the original actor to portray George Baxter. In the pilot episode, the role was played by character actor Edward Andrews. DeFore took over the role when the series was green-lighted. The series ran on NBC for four seasons (1961–65); DeFore and his co-star Whitney Blake were written out of the series when CBS picked up the series for its final season (1965–66).

In 1970, DeFore appeared as Mayor Evans on the TV Western The Men from Shiloh in the episode titled "Colonel Mackenzie Versus the West". In that role, he played a murderer, which was a major shift from the comedy roles for which he was better known on The Adventures of Ozzie and Harriet and Hazel.

For his contribution to the television industry, Don DeFore has a star on the Hollywood Walk of Fame located at 6804 Hollywood Blvd.

=== Writing ===
In 1965, DeFore and his daughter Penny wrote With All My Love, a book detailing Penny's experiences working in a Korean orphanage. DeFore's memoirs, "Hollywood DeFore 'n After", were never published, however, his youngest son, Ronald, included portions in his book, Growing Up in Disneyland, Waldorf Publishing 2019, along with his own biography. The title was a metaphor for his life in a celebrity family but was also literal as his father was the only person to own a food establishment bearing the name of a real person: "Don DeFore's Silver Banjo Barbecue" in Frontierland, 1957–1962.

== Personal life ==
=== Marriage and children ===
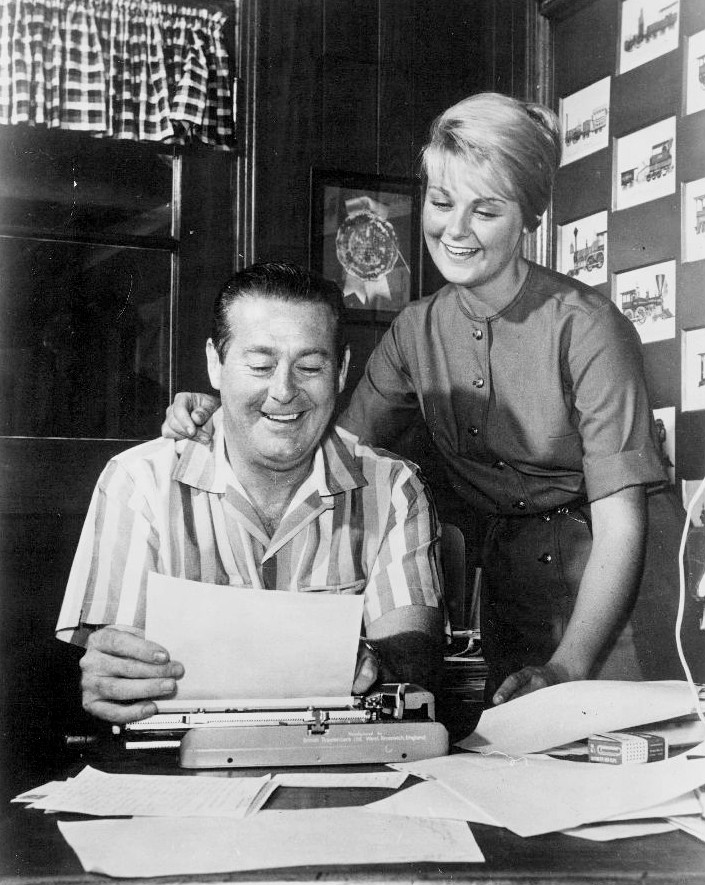
Appearing with daughter Penny in the play Generation in 1967 at Pheasant Run Playhouse

DeFore married singer Marion Holmes (January 21, 1918 – November 17, 2011) on February 14, 1942. Judy Garland served as Holmes's matron of honor. Holmes performed with the Henry Busse Orchestra from 1935 to 1939, and later with Art Kassel and his "Castles in the Air" from 1939 until their marriage. They had five children: Penny, David, Dawn, Ronald, and Autumn. They remained married until DeFore's death in 1993.

=== Politics and other activities ===
DeFore and his family were longtime residents of the Mandeville Canyon section of Brentwood and attended the Village Church of Westwood Lutheran. DeFore served as Brentwood's honorary mayor and also served as a member of the advisory committee for the California Department of Rehabilitation. He was also a 33rd degree Scottish Rite and Master Mason Freemason.

From 1957 to 1962, DeFore and his family operated the Silver Banjo Barbecue, a restaurant located in Frontierland of Disneyland Park in Anaheim, California. In July 1969, DeFore served as the American delegate at the Moscow International Film Festival.

A long-time Republican, DeFore supported Barry Goldwater in the 1964 United States presidential election and was a delegate at the 1976 and 1980 Republican National Conventions. His friend, former actor and 40th President of the United States Ronald Reagan, appointed him to the Presidential Advisory Council to the Peace Corps. His youngest son, Ronald, also held political positions within the Reagan Administration, which he highlights in his book, Growing Up in Disneyland, Waldorf Publishing, 2019, that was both an autobiography and partial biography of his father.

== Death ==
On December 22, 1993, DeFore died of cardiac arrest at Saint John's Health Center in Santa Monica, California. His cremated remains are inurned at the Westwood Village Memorial Park Cemetery in Los Angeles.

== Partial filmography ==
- Reunion (1936) - Bit Role (uncredited)
- Kid Galahad (1937) - Ringsider (uncredited)
- Submarine D-1 (1937) - Sailor (uncredited)
- Freshman Year (1938) - Upperclassman (uncredited)
- Brother Rat (1938) - Baseball Catcher (uncredited)
- We Go Fast (1941) - Herman Huff (as Don DeForest)
- Right to the Heart (1942) - Tommy Sands (as Don De Fore)
- The Male Animal (1942) - Wally Myers
- Winning Your Wings (1942, Short) - Gas Station Attendant (uncredited)
- Wings for the Eagle (1942) - Gil Borden
- Men of the Sky (1942, Short) - Cadet Dick Mathews
- You Can't Escape Forever (1942) - Davis, Reporter (uncredited)
- City Without Men (1943) - Mr. Peters (uncredited)
- The Human Comedy (1943) - Bernard 'Texas' Anthony (uncredited)
- A Guy Named Joe (1943) - James J. Rourke (as Don De Fore)
- Practical Joker (1944, Short)
- Return From Nowhere (1944, Short) - Allan (uncredited)
- Thirty Seconds Over Tokyo (1944) - Charles McClure
- The Affairs of Susan (1945) - Mike Ward
- You Came Along (1945) - Captain W. Anders
- The Stork Club (1945) - Sergeant Danny Wilton
- Without Reservations (1946) - Dink
- Ramrod (1947) - Bill Schell
- It Happened on Fifth Avenue (1947) - Jim Bullock
- Romance on the High Seas (1948) - Michael Kent
- One Sunday Afternoon (1948) - Hugo F. Barnstead
- Too Late for Tears (1949) - Don Blake / Don Blanchard
- My Friend Irma (1949) - Richard Rhinelander
- Dark City (1950) - Arthur Winant
- Southside 1-1000 (1950) - John Riggs / Nick Starnes
- The Guy Who Came Back (1951) - Gordon Towne
- A Girl in Every Port (1952) - Bert Sedgwick
- No Room for the Groom (1952) - Herman Strouple
- And Now Tomorrow (1952)
- Jumping Jacks (1952) - Lieutenant Kelsey
- She's Working Her Way Through College (1952) - Shep Slade
- Battle Hymn (1957) - Captain Dan Skidmore
- A Time to Love and a Time to Die (1958) - Hermann Boettcher
- The Facts of Life (1960) - Jack Weaver
- Alfred Hitchcock Presents (1961) (Season 6 Episode 26: "Coming, Mama") - Arthur Clark
- Daddy-O (1961, TV Movie) - Ben Cousin a.k.a. Daddy-O
- A Punt, a Pass, and a Prayer (1968, TV Movie) - Rooter Baker
- Mannix (1970) - Ted Hackett
- Rare Breed (1984) - Frank Nelson

== Awards and nominations ==
Year	Award	Category	Nominated work	Result
1955	7th Primetime Emmy Awards	Best Supporting Actor in a Regular Series	The Adventures of Ozzie and Harriet	Nominated
