= Whitney Blake =

American actress and director (1926–2002)

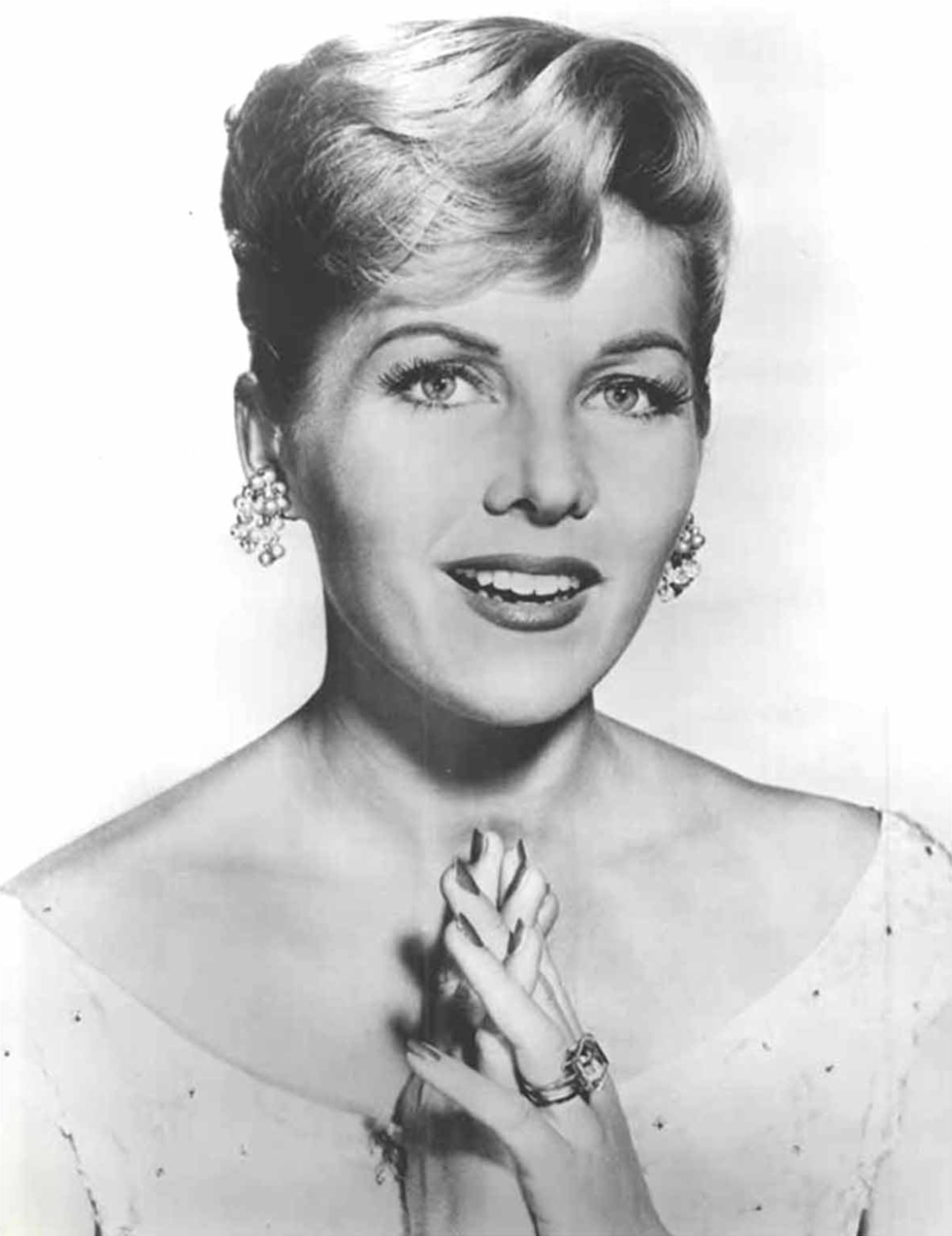
- Blake in 1960
- Born: Nancy Ann Whitney; February 20, 1926; Los Angeles, California, U.S.
- Died: September 28, 2002 (aged 76); Edgartown, Massachusetts, U.S.
- Occupations: Actress, director, producer
- Years active: 1956–1998
- Spouses: Tom Baxter (m. 1944; div. 1955) Jack Fields (m. 1957; div. 1967) Allan Manings (m. 1968)
- Children: 3, including Meredith Baxter

Whitney Blake (born Nancy Ann Whitney; February 20, 1926 – September 28, 2002) was an American film and television actress, director, and producer. She is known for her four seasons portraying Dorothy Baxter, the mother, on the 1960s sitcom Hazel, and as co-creator and writer of the sitcom One Day at a Time. With her first husband she had three children, including actress Meredith Baxter.

== Early life ==
Blake was born in Eagle Rock, Los Angeles. She was the first child of Martha Mae Whitney (née Wilkerson) and Harry C. Whitney, a United States Secret Service agent who had guarded President Woodrow Wilson, his wife, and other political officials. Blake and her younger brother traveled around the country extensively, during which time she attended 16 different schools. While attending Pasadena City College, she worked in small theater groups in the Los Angeles area. In the summer, she worked at her mother's ice cream stand in McMinnville, Oregon.

== Acting ==
Blake gained acting experience with five years of work in little theater productions. In 1953, she was in several productions at the Pasadena Playhouse. After her appearance in an amateur Hollywood production of The Women caught the attention of agent Sid Gold, she appeared on a number of television series, including the syndicated Johnny Midnight, The Sheriff of Cochise, twice on Rod Cameron's State Trooper, and on the David Janssen crime drama Richard Diamond, Private Detective. Her first television appearance was on NBC Matinee Theater.

Blake was cast in My Gun Is Quick, the film version of a Mike Hammer novel by Mickey Spillane.

In 1957, she appeared in the first episode of CBS's Perry Mason, "The Case of the Restless Redhead," in the title role of Evelyn Bagby, the defendant. In 1958, she again appeared in the title role as defendant Diana Reynolds in the episode "The Case of the Black-Eyed Blonde".

Also in 1957, Blake played Lilli Bridgeman, who hires a professional assassin to murder her husband, Les (Alan Hale Jr.), so she can marry a rival rancher, Kiley Rand (Don Megowan), in the episode "Hired Gun" of the ABC/Warner Bros. Western series Cheyenne, starring Clint Walker.

Blake played leading lady to James Garner in "The Day They Hanged Bret Maverick," the second-season opener in 1958 for the ABC/WB Western series, Maverick.

She appeared with Claude Akins in two 1959 episodes, "Cattle Drive" and "Border Incident," of the CBS Western The Texan, starring Rory Calhoun.

In 1959, Blake guest-starred in the first episode, "The Good Samaritan," of the syndicated Western series Pony Express. That same year, her guest appearance in the short-lived series The D.A.'s Man garnered her an Emmy nomination.

She appeared in a Gunsmoke episode called "Wind" in March 1959 and one in 1973 called "A Game of Death...and of Life". Blake played a gambler's lady who tried to shoot Matt Dillon in the back. She also guest-starred on an episode of the detective series 77 Sunset Strip.

Blake appeared in the 1959 film -30-, with Jack Webb, as a childless couple wanting to adopt a baby. The "-30-" comes from the symbol at the end of a newspaper story, as Webb played a newspaperman in the film. That year she also appeared as Ann Samuels in the first season of the series Bonanza, episode 13, ″Vendetta″.

In 1960, she played Callie Carter in the Rawhide episode "Incident of the Murder Steer" (Season 2, Episode 28).

Blake guest-starred on Mike Connors' CBS detective series, Tightrope!; the CBS sitcom, Pete and Gladys; and on the NBC Western series, Riverboat, starring Darren McGavin; and Overland Trail, with William Bendix and Doug McClure. She performed the lead female dramatic role on the Route 66 TV series in a January 1960 episode (first season). She also guest-starred on police drama TV series M Squad, starring Lee Marvin (Season 3, Episode 25). In 1960, with Robert Lansing, she co-starred in an episode of the TV series Thriller.

Blake is best remembered for her portrayal of Dorothy Baxter, an interior designer and the wife of George Baxter (Don DeFore), a lawyer, on the NBC sitcom Hazel (1961). Following the show's cancellation by NBC in 1965, DeFore and Blake were dropped from the series when CBS picked up the show for one more season. They were replaced by Ray Fulmer and Lynn Borden, respectively, in the roles of Steve and Barbara Baxter, the younger brother and sister-in-law of George Baxter.

After Hazel, Blake guest-starred in an episode of the ABC Western series The Legend of Jesse James. In 1966, she appeared in the episode "Nice Day for a Hanging" of Chuck Connors' NBC Western series, Branded. In 1968, she appeared in a final season episode of The Andy Griffith Show as an attractive lawyer in Raleigh named Lee Drake, whom Sheriff Andy Taylor has to give a deposition to on a case in Mayberry involving a Raleigh resident. She guest-starred in a 1974 episode of Cannon and in a 1978 episode of Family, a series in which her daughter, Meredith Baxter, co-starred.

== Later career ==
As demand for her work in network television and films waned, Whitney Blake became a Los Angeles television talk-show host. Later, Blake moved into directing and producing.

Blake co-created the television series One Day at a Time with her husband Allan Manings. The sitcom ran for nine seasons on the CBS network and made household names of its stars: Bonnie Franklin, Mackenzie Phillips, Valerie Bertinelli, and Pat Harrington.

== Personal life ==
Blake married Tom Baxter in early 1944. They had three children: sons, Richard Whitney Baxter and Brian Thomas Baxter and daughter, Meredith Ann Baxter. In 1988, her son Brian began co-ownership (with Blake) of a Minneapolis bookstore, Baxter's Books, which closed in 1998. Her daughter, Meredith, became an actress, starring in the 1980s sitcom Family Ties.

In 1957, Blake married talent agent Jack X Fields; they divorced in 1967.

Singer and actress Whitney Houston (1963–2012) was named after Blake, as stated in the 2018 documentary Whitney.

From August 24, 1968, until her death in 2002, she was married to writer/collaborator Allan Manings.

== Illness and death ==
On Blake's 76th birthday she told her children she had been diagnosed with esophageal cancer. She died seven months later.

Blake died at her home on September 28, 2002, in Edgartown, Massachusetts. She was cremated, and her ashes were kept by her family. Approximately 8 years later, Allan Manings (her husband at the time of her death) also was diagnosed with esophageal cancer, before eventually dying.

== Filmography ==
Year	Title	Role	Notes
1957	Perry Mason	Evelyn Bagby/Diana Reynolds	The Restless Redhead/The Black-Eyed Blonde S1, E1 & E37
1957	My Gun Is Quick	Nancy Williams	
1957	Collector's Item: The Left Fist of David	Jan Hendrix	TV movie
1958	Maverick	Letty French/Molly Clifford	"The Burning Sky"/"The Day They Hanged Bret Maverick"
1959	-30-	Peggy Gatlin	
1959	Rawhide	Angie	S1:E13, "Incident of the Curious Street"
1959	The Restless Gun		Episode "One on the House"
1959	Bonanza	Ann Samuels	Episode: "Vendetta"
1960	The Millionaire	Nancy Cortez	Episode: "The Story of Nancy Cortez"
1959	Gunsmoke	Dolly Varden	Season 4 Episode 28: "Wind"
1960	Rawhide	Callie Carter	S2:E28, "Incident of the Murder Steer"
1960-1961	Bronco	Laurel Shelton	2 episodes
1961	The Aquanauts	Ruth Cheney	S1:E14 "Niagara Dive"
1961	Route 66	Laura Church	S1:E12 "Sheba"
1961-1965	Hazel	Dorothy Baxter	regular cast - 122 episodes
1966	The Man from U.N.C.L.E.	Corinne Ackers	S3:E16 "The Take Me to Your Leader Affair"
1966	Branded	Nan Richards	S2:E21 "Nice Day for a Hanging"
1967	Mannix	Cloris Loman	S1:E10 "Coffin for a Clown"
1967	The Andy Griffith Show	Lee Drake	Episode: "Andy's Trip to Raleigh"
1974	The Stranger Who Looks Like Me	Emma Verko	ABC Movie of the Week
1974	Cannon	Donna Roberts	S4:E5 "The Deadly Trail"
1975	Ironside	Laura Gaynor	S8:E19 "A Matter of Life and Death"
1975	Medical Story	Mrs. Taber	S1:E6 "Million Dollar Baby"
1975	Returning Home	Millie Stephenson	ABC Movie of the Week
1975	Mobile One	Louise McNeil	S1:E11 "The Listening Ear"
1977	Hunter	Dr. Fearing	2 episodes
1978	The Betsy	Elizabeth / Loren Hardeman Sr.'s wife	
1978	Family	Eve Carson	Episode: "Friend’s Affair, The"
1981	A Face in the Crowd		(final film role)
