= Hazel (TV series) =

American sitcom (1961–1966)

- Shirley Booth as the title character, Hazel Burke
- Genre: Sitcom
- Created by: Ted Key
- Based on: The Saturday Evening Post character
- Directed by: E. W. Swackhamer; William D. Russell
- Starring: Shirley Booth; Don DeFore; Whitney Blake; Bobby Buntrock; Ray Fulmer; Lynn Borden; Julia Benjamin
- Theme music composer: Jimmy Van Heusen; Sammy Cahn; Howard Greenfield; Helen Miller; Jack Keller
- Opening theme: "Hazel" (1961–1964)
- Composers: Van Alexander; Allyn Ferguson; William Loose; Fred Steiner; Joseph Weiss; Charles Albertine; Hugo Montenegro; Philip Green; Eugene Poddany
- Country of origin: United States
- Original language: English
- No. of seasons: 5 (1 in black & white (except for S1 E6), 4 in color (including S1 E6))
- No. of episodes: 154 (34 in black & white, 120 in color) (list of episodes)

Production
- Executive producer: Harry Ackerman
- Producer: James Fonda
- Camera setup: Single-camera
- Running time: 30 minutes
- Production company: Screen Gems

Original release
- Network: NBC
- Release: September 28, 1961 – March 25, 1965
- Network: CBS
- Release: September 13, 1965 – April 11, 1966

Hazel is an American sitcom about a spunky live-in maid named Hazel Burke (played by Shirley Booth) and her employers, the Baxters. The five-season, 154-episode series aired in prime time from September 28, 1961, to April 11, 1966, and was produced by Screen Gems, a division of Columbia Pictures. The first four seasons of Hazel aired on NBC, and the fifth and final season aired on CBS. Season 1 was broadcast in black-and-white except for one episode which was in color, and seasons 2–5 were all broadcast in color. The show was based on the single-panel comic strip of the same title by cartoonist Ted Key, which appeared in The Saturday Evening Post.

== Development ==
Hazel was a beloved character in American popular culture in the twentieth century. On February 20, 1943, the first Hazel cartoon was published in the Post; it appeared weekly from August of that year until 1969, when the magazine ceased publication, and then was distributed to newspapers by King Features Syndicate. In 1946 Key published the first of several books of Hazel cartoons. In the 1950s, he coauthored a three-act play featuring Hazel. He wanted Booth to play the starring role. She loved the character but declined because she disliked the script.

In 1959, Curtis Publishing Company, which published the Post and owned the rights to Hazel, marketed the property to television for the first time. Curtis and Key reviewed proposals from David Susskind’s production company Talent Associates, which suggested Audrey Meadows for the role of Hazel; George Gobel’s Gomalco, which proposed Ann B. Davis; and Screen Gems, which had produced hit television series like Dennis the Menace. William Dozier, vice president in charge of production at Screen Gems, remarked that while Talent Associates and Gomalco guaranteed Curtis that they would film pilots, Screen Gems agreed to do so only if they could develop a good script. This approach impressed Curtis, which selected Screen Gems.

Dozier, executive producer Harry Ackerman, and producer James Fonda assembled a creative team for the pilot that included William Cowley and Peggy Chantler Dick as writers and William D. Russell as director; this team had worked together on Dennis the Menace. They drafted a script with Key. As Dozier acknowledged, “Remember, we were transposing her [Hazel] from a cartoon figure, with a cloudy pair of employers, to the world of flesh and blood. We needed Key to make sure we would not damage that intangible whatever-it-was that had made Hazel a successful cartoon for 17 years.”

Dozier wanted Booth for the role of Hazel, but he did not believe that she would agree to do a weekly television series. So Screen Gems pursued Thelma Ritter, who declined because she did not have the stamina for the role; Kay Medford, who was not willing to relocate to Los Angeles; and Glenda Farrell, who made demands that Screen Gems considered unreasonable. Eventually, Dozier decided to approach Booth through her agent, and she accepted the part shortly thereafter.

Booth signed a five-year contract to star in Hazel. Her decision surprised many observers. At the time, she was best known as a prestigious dramatic actress on Broadway and in film who had won three Tony Awards and the 1952 Best Actress Academy Award for Come Back, Little Sheba. Although she had guest starred in television drama anthology and variety and game shows, she had avoided doing a series, especially a sitcom. Some of her friends, including Burt Lancaster, her costar in Come Back, Little Sheba, urged her to back out of the show because appearing in a sitcom was allegedly beneath her. She replied that she enjoyed making people laugh. She also told a reporter that she took the role because she loved the character and because good parts on stage and in film were scarce. She said to another journalist: “Actors love good parts…. Hazel is a good part. She is a good human soul, honest and likable. The most important thing is that she’s capable of honest anger—a good, strong, purging emotion—without being nasty about it. Instead, she substitutes a sense of humor—which is really a sense of good taste—and hence manages to get away with saying the things most of us wish we’d said.” In addition, after having appeared in three successive Broadway flops (Miss Isobel, 1957; Juno, 1959; A Second String, 1960), the actress welcomed the financial rewards of starring in a weekly television series.

The pilot for Hazel was filmed in February 1961. To physically transform into the character, Booth wore a red wig and a maid’s uniform; she also learned how to bowl and kick a football. To gain insight into the character’s personality, she drew on a twenty-nine-page document by Key, known as the “Hazel Bible.” Before the series premiered, she told a New York Times reporter: “I am still feeling my way with Hazel…. She must have humor of course. She has to have a strong maternal complex. She is a little bit of a major-domo…. I am taking a line drawing and trying to make it into an oil painting.’" She further developed the character as she began rehearsals: “After we’re into rehearsal and I see the people who are going to do it with me, then I decide what to do. You have to adjust to other people.” In 1962, a reporter observed that when she performed on set as Hazel, “her facial expression changed. Her body slumped and she looked pounds heavier. Her speech became more casual. Her walk was different. She had changed into Hazel.”

== Synopsis ==
=== Seasons 1–4 ===
The series takes place in an upper-class neighborhood in an unnamed town in the United States, which is described in one episode as a “suburb in the East.” Hazel is a competent, take-charge, live-in maid in the home of the Baxter family, which is located at 123 Marshal Road. George Baxter (Don DeFore) is a partner in the law firm of Butterworth, Hatch, Noll and Baxter; Hazel calls him "Mr. B". George's wife, Dorothy (Whitney Blake), is a part-time interior decorator, whom Hazel nicknames "Missy". Their son Harold (Bobby Buntrock) is dubbed "Sport" by Hazel. The family dog is Smiley. Hazel had worked previously with Dorothy's family, and has a close relationship with her. Despite her cheerful persona, she has experienced hardship. Her mother died when she was 14 (she said in one episode) so she had to take care of her own family. In addition, the love of her life was Gus Jenkins, a sailor who went abroad and did not communicate with her for 25 years; she keeps a photograph of him on the nightstand next to her bed. In the last paragraph of the Hazel Bible, Key imagines her alone in her room in the evening: “This woman, like any other, has plans; she has hopes and dreams. Hazel lies in her bed, in her room, in her home. And in this home, she is alone.”

The series humorously dramatizes Hazel's life with the Baxters and her friendships with others in the neighborhood, such as postman Barney Hatfield (Robert Williams), taxi-driver Mitch Brady (Dub Taylor), and Rosie Hammaker (Maudie Prickett), another maid in the neighborhood, who along with Hazel is a member of the Sunshine Girls, also known as the Society of Domestic Engineers—a group referenced in several episodes. Many episodes focus on the perennial contest of wills between Hazel and George over issues around the house; "Mr. B" usually concedes defeat and grants Hazel's wishes when she tortures him by serving meager portions of her mouth-watering meals and desserts as an incentive for him to “lose a few pounds.”

George’s exasperation with Hazel generated much of the show’s comedy. DeFore explained his approach to his character: "I learned just how far to push the anger button, … the frustration button, the righteous indignation button—and the valve of affection that George, despite his best efforts, holds for this infuriating woman. Now some of our finest comedy springs from moments in which I am forced to defend Hazel." On their rapport, Booth remarked: "Don’s contribution is incalculable. The show couldn't be without him. He gives off the complete aura of frustration without rancor. He is a wonderful man—you read it in his face and you are comfortable with him."

Some episodes take Hazel outside the Baxter house and follow her life in the community. In the first episode, for example, she spearheads a drive for the construction of a neighborhood playground. Hazel's life is sometimes complicated by George's snobby Bostonian sister Deirdre Thompson (Cathy Lewis) and his gruff client Harvey Griffin (Howard Smith). Dotty neighbors Herbert and Harriet Johnson (Donald Foster and Norma Varden) often call upon Hazel's expertise in household matters, of which they seem ignorant.

=== Network change and final season ===
During its fourth season, Hazel faced stiff competition from Peyton Place, a hit drama that premiered on ABC in September 1964. After a four-season run on NBC, the network canceled the series, but it was picked up by CBS for what would be a fifth and final season. To boost ratings, Screen Gems began to consider a format change and proposed replacing DeFore and Blake with more youthful cast members. Early reports stated that Hazel would move to Hollywood to work for a talent agent and his wife, an opportunity to feature celebrity guest stars. As Booth told a reporter, "'They told me we could jazz it up by moving Hazel to Hollywood and using guest stars…. But I thought they meant move Mr. B and the whole family to Hollywood. But that wasn’t the idea. Just Hazel.'" By April 1965 the Hollywood format had been abandoned. But in an effort to appeal to a younger audience, DeFore and Blake were dropped after the move to CBS. George and Dorothy’s departure was explained as a temporary relocation to Baghdad, Iraq (and later Saudi Arabia) because George’s client Mr. Griffin engaged him to work on an oil deal in the Middle East. Hazel and Harold (who did not depart with his parents so he wouldn't miss any school) moved in with George's never-before-mentioned younger brother, Steve (Ray Fulmer), a real estate agent, Steve's wife Barbara (Lynn Borden), and their daughter Susie (Julia Benjamin) (a genealogical chart of the Baxter family displayed in the last episode of season one showed that George had two siblings—his sisters Deirdre and Phyllis, but no brother Steve). Hazel provided the same housekeeping services for her revamped family. As for the drop in two of the main characters, CBS had said that Blake was not available after the move to the network, although DeFore stated that he was never informed of the change and found out about it while reading a newspaper. Ann Jillian, who was then a teenager, was also added to the cast as Millie Ballard, Steve Baxter's receptionist. Jillian later went on to star in her own series, It's a Living, in the 1980s, as well as several television films.

The last episode of Hazel aired on April 11, 1966. The series ended for a variety of reasons. Ratings continued to decline. By the close of the fifth season, more than enough episodes had been filmed to create an attractive syndication package. In addition, Booth’s five-year contract expired, and health problems made the grind of a weekly series more challenging for her. In her memoir, Benjamin wrote: "Shortly after New Year, our happiness turned to sadness when we found out that we were not going to be picked up for another season. It wasn’t a question of ratings. Even though the show was not doing as well after The Andy Griffith Show as CBS had hoped, the network was willing to renew us. But Shirley was having health issues. She was approaching seventy years old, and the work schedule was taking its toll." Similarly, in a letter of tribute that she wrote after Booth’s death, Borden stated that during the show’s fifth season, a nurse accompanied Booth on set and that she ultimately told her castmates she was ending the show because of illness.

== Production notes ==
Don DeFore, Bobby Buntrock, Whitney Blake from the first-season episode "Hazel's Secret Wish"

The series was filmed at Columbia Sunset Gower Studios, Hollywood, California. The artist Mark Bennett included a floor plan of the Baxters' house in his book TV Sets: Fantasy Blueprints of Classic TV Homes. Exteriors were shot at the Columbia Ranch in Burbank. This movie ranch facade used as the Baxters' house had previously been seen in several Three Stooges films, and was used as the home for the Lawrences on the sitcom Gidget. From the driveway, the house next door to the right is recognizable as that of Darrin and Samantha Stephens from Bewitched.

In the pilot episode of the show, the part of George Baxter was played by Edward Andrews. Test audiences were not comfortable with Andrews playing the role, so when the series was green-lighted, it was recast with DeFore. Regarding the replacement of Andrews, William Dozier observed that after the pilot was filmed, "everybody realized that Eddie Andrews was somehow not the right foil for Hazel."

The episode "What'll We Watch Tonight?," in which Hazel purchases a color TV, is the only first-season episode shot in color and appears to promote color television sets. NBC, which aired the series, was owned by RCA, the largest seller of color television sets, during the period when most viewers still had black-and-white TVs (at the beginning of 1965, 92 percent of American households owned a TV, but less than 10 percent owned a color TV). Booth as Hazel and DeFore as George were featured in an advertisement for RCA Victor's New Vista color TV, in the February 28, 1964, issue of Life magazine; a legend at the top of the advertisement invited readers to visit the "RCA Color TV Center" at the 1964 World’s Fair in New York, which would open in April.

In several episodes of the first season of the show, DeFore’s right hand is wrapped in a bandage the size of a boxing glove. The actor had seriously cut one of his fingers with a circular power saw in his home workshop. When it became clear that he would have to wear the bandage for an extended time, a reference was inserted into the fourth episode, in which George says that he was injured while playing shortstop in a baseball game with Bobby while Hazel was at bat.

In July 1963, the National Association for the Advancement of Colored People (NAACP) announced that unless the show added a Black person to the off-camera technical staff, the organization would begin a boycott of the show's sponsor, the Ford Motor Company. After this announcement was made, Booth said that she did not think that the NAACP wanted a Black actress to play a maid and commented that "Americans … are becoming too self-conscious about this (race) problem." Two months after the announcement, the show's producers announced that a Black production executive had joined the show. James L. Tolbert, president of the NAACP’s Beverly Hills-Hollywood branch, praised Booth and the show, but described the actress as "uninformed on the civil right struggle." In an article published two days after the historic March on Washington, Tolbert stated: "Our singling out of the 'Hazel' series as an example of 'lily-white' technical crew hiring has been ballyhooed to the extent that the show’s star, Shirley Booth, took time from her vacation to announce she’s not racially prejudiced."

=== Theme song ===
While Hazel began with an instrumental theme song composed by the Academy Award–winning team of Sammy Cahn and James Van Heusen, the closing credits during the first eight shows of the inaugural season played the song with lyrics sung by The Modernaires. A typescript manuscript of the lyrics, which includes bars that were not used for the broadcast version, is in the collection of the Margaret Herrick Library of the Academy of Motion Picture Arts and Sciences in Beverly Hills. This theme song was replaced in the fourth season by one composed by Howard Greenfield and Helen Miller and in the fifth and final season by one composed by Howard Greenfield and Jack Keller.

=== Sponsors ===
In 1961, before Hazel premiered, Screen Gems offered the series for national sponsorship in a 17-page promotional booklet. It proclaimed: "This coming season, Screen Gems will offer for national sponsorship a new family comedy based on HAZEL…. a series that we believe will reach a new high in television entertainment … a series that has all of the elements—a huge, built-in audience, a broad base of character identification, a home-centered setting—to make it an outstanding advertising investment." During its first four seasons, Hazel was sponsored by Ford Motor Company, which had earlier underwritten Tennessee Ernie Ford's comedy and variety show, The Ford Show, the program that Hazel replaced. At the time, Ford focused its television advertising budget on family shows that drew audiences in both urban and rural areas and that typically featured a strong personality with a friendly rapport. In particular, Hazel's broad popularity with families appealed to Ford. As a result, Ford vehicles, including the Baxters' Country Squire station wagon, their red Galaxie convertible, their blue Thunderbird, and their red Mustang convertible when it was introduced in 1964, were often prominently featured on the series, even as a part of the storylines, an example of product placement. In addition, all of the main cast members, and even some recurring cast members, filmed commercials for Ford that were aired during the show. Some of these commercials can be found on video-sharing platforms like YouTube. During season four, Lever Brothers co-sponsored Hazel. In its final season, Procter & Gamble and Philip Morris replaced Ford as the sponsors.

== Cast ==
=== Main cast ===
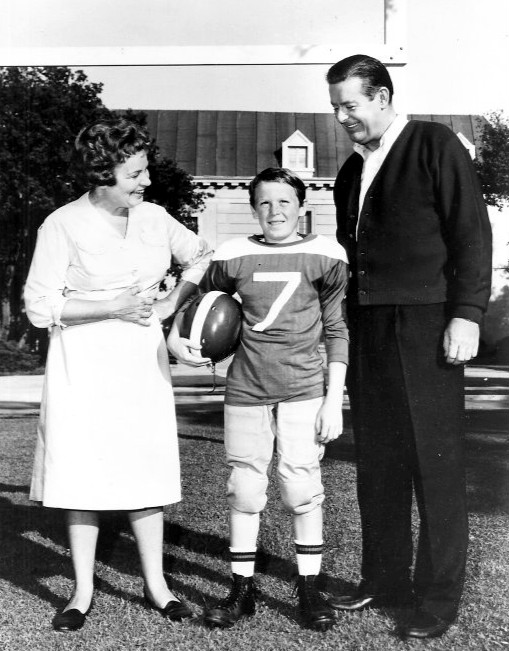
Shirley Booth, Don DeFore with son Ron DeFore on set of first episode "Hazel and the Playground"

The original NBC series starred Don DeFore and Whitney Blake as George and Dorothy Baxter. When CBS picked up the series for the fifth season, they replaced DeFore and Blake with Ray Fulmer and Lynn Borden, who played George’s younger brother and sister-in-law. Julia Benjamin was added to the cast as their daughter, Susie. CBS felt a younger cast would improve the ratings. The CBS broadcast began September 13, 1965.

- Shirley Booth as Hazel (all 5 seasons, 1961–1966)
- Don DeFore as George Baxter (seasons 1–4, 1961–1965) (Hazel nicknamed him "Mr. B")
- Whitney Blake as Dorothy Baxter (seasons 1–4, 1961–1965) (Hazel nicknamed her "Missy")
- Bobby Buntrock as Harold Baxter (all 5 seasons, 1961–1966) (Hazel nicknamed him "Sport")
- Ray Fulmer as Steve Baxter (season 5, 1965–1966)
- Lynn Borden as Barbara Baxter (season 5, 1965–1966)
- Julia Benjamin as Susie Baxter (season 5, 1965–1966)

=== Recurring cast ===
- Maudie Prickett as Hazel’s friend and fellow maid Rosie (all 5 seasons, 1961–1966, 36 episodes)
- Howard Smith as George Baxter's client Mr. Harvey Griffin (seasons 1–4, 1961–1965, 27 episodes)
- Cathy Lewis as George Baxter’s sister Deirdre Thompson (all 5 seasons, 1961–1966, 17 episodes)
- Robert B. Williams as Hazel’s friend and mailman Barney (seasons 1–5, 1961–1965, 18 episodes)
- Donald Foster as the Baxters' neighbor Herbert Johnson (seasons 1–4, 1961–1964, 14 episodes)
- Norma Varden as the Baxters' neighbor Harriet Johnson (seasons 1–4, 1961–1964, 13 episodes)
- Lauren Gilbert as George Baxter’s colleague Harry Noll (seasons 2–4, 1963–1964, 12 episodes) (also as Phil Baldwin, 1961, 1 episode)
- Ann Jillian as Steve Baxter’s part-time secretary Millie Ballard (season 5, 1965–1966, 11 episodes) (also as Laurie, season 3, 1963, 1 episode)
- Mala Powers as Barbara Baxter’s friend Mona Williams (season 5, 1965–1966, 10 episodes)
- Charles Bateman as Steve Baxter’s friend and colleague Fred Williams (season 5, 1965–1966, 9 episodes)
- Queenie Leonard as Hazel’s friend and fellow maid Mert (seasons 1, 2, 5, 1961–1962, 1965, 7 episodes) (also as Peggy and Marybelle, seasons 3–4, 1963, 1965, 2 episodes)
- Dub Taylor as Hazel's friend and owner of the local taxi company (seasons (seasons 1–2, 1962–1963, 4 episodes)
- Gregory Morton as Hazel's boyfriend Enzo Martelli (seasons 3–5, 1963, 1965, 3 episodes)
- Karen Steele as Rita Noll, Harry Noll's wife (season 4, 1964, 3 episodes)

=== Notable guest cast ===
- Hal Smith as Announcer (S1E01, 1961)
- Francis DeSales as Osborn Bailey (S1E01, 1961)
- Lurene Tuttle as Mrs. Pruett (S1E01, 1961)
- Maurice Manson as Mr. Pruett (S1E01, 1961)
- Victor French as Bailiff (S1E4, 1961)
- Harriet E. MacGibbon as George Baxter's mother, Mrs. Baxter (S1E9, 1961)
- Donnelly Rhodes as Joe (S1E13, 1961)
- Elvia Allman as Gertrude (S1E15, 1962)
- Kathie Browne as George Baxter's former girlfriend (S1E19, 1962)
- John Astin as Hal Gordon (S1E20, 1962)
- Doris Singleton as Mimi Andrews (S1E30, 1962) and as Lady Hobart (S2E28, 1963)
- Mary Grace Canfield as Miss Simmons (S1E31, 1962)
- Alan Hale Jr. as Peter Warren (S1E32, 1962) and as Coach Murphy (S3E7, 1963)
- Rosemary DeCamp as Sybil (S2E1, 1962)
- Harold Gould as Mr. Prior (S2E1, 1962), TV announcer (S3E30, 1964), Mr. Wheeler (S4E1, 1964), and Judge Winston (S4E25, 1965)
- Jamie Farr as Counterman (S2E5, 1962) and Antonio (S3E31, 1964)
- James Doohan as Gordon MacHeath (S2E18, 1963)
- Dick Sargent as Pete (S2E20, 1963)
- William Schallert as Kemper (S2E22, 1963)
- Sue England as Marie (S2E24)
- John Zaremba as Mr. Hancock (S2E28, 1963)
- Diane Ladd as Sharlene (S3E8, 1963)
- Douglas Dick as Gabe Fairchild (S3E10, 1963) and as Tom Jennings (S4E2, 1964)
- Frank Gifford as himself (S3E15, 1963)
- Alice Pearce as Miss Elsie (S3E17, 1964)
- Mabel Albertson as Miss Ramsey (S3E22, 1964) and as Mrs. Clark (S5E8, 1965)
- Harvey Korman as Max Denton (S3E32, 1964)
- Ken Berry as Phil Merrick (S4E4, 1964)
- Frank Cady as Mr. Pincus (S4E5, 1964)
- Michael Callan as Kevin (S4E6, 1964)
- Peggy Rea as Mrs. Masters (S4E9, 1964)
- Aki Aleong as Mike Shiga (S4E24, 1965)
- Lee Meriwether as Miss Wilson (S5E3, 1965)
- Ellen Corby as Minerva Anderson (S5E5, 1965) and Miss Minnie (S3E4, 1963, 1 episode)
- Dabney Coleman as Lee Swanton (S5E6, 1965)
- Bonnie Franklin as open house visitor (uncredited) (S5E8, November 8, 1965)
- Alvy Moore as Mr. Haverstraw (S5E15, 1966)
- Pat O’Brien as Uncle Jerome Van Meter (S5E16, 1966)
- Claude Akins as Milwaukee Ames (S5E23, 1966)

== Reception ==
Hazel originally aired on NBC on Thursdays at 9:30 p.m. The show's first season placed fourth in the 1961–1962 Nielsen's ratings. By the end of second season the ratings had slipped from 4 (27.7 share) to 15 (25.1 share) and then to 22 (22.8 share) for the third season, 42 (31.3 share) for the fourth season, and 56 (30.2 share) for the fifth season.

Shirley Booth received two Emmy Awards (1962 and 1963) for Hazel, and a nomination for her third season (1964). During her acceptance speech for her first Emmy, she exclaimed, "Boy, this is a doozy!," one of her catchphrases from the show. Booth also received a Golden Globe nomination for Best TV Star (1964) and two posthumous nominations for the TV Land Award, Favorite Made-for-TV Maid (2004 and 2006).

Nevertheless, while most critics praised Booth’s performance, they generally panned the show itself. The New York Times described Booth as “the latest member of the Sardi aristocracy to go West in pursuit of those satisfying film residuals” and described the first episode as a “vidpix all the way, but hard as they tried, the California minions couldn’t quite extinguish Miss Booth’s warmth.” The Hollywood Reporter praised Booth, but described the show as "an amiable entry, about par for the course, but without anything special (at least in the opener) that is likely to make it a winner in the increasingly grim ratings competition." Variety was even more critical: "The comedy in this Screen Gems opus is so banal and so shamelessly contrived that it can only be exasperating to the adult mind…. The series shapes as a comedown for Miss Booth."

According to Playbill a New York City reading of Hazel, a musical based on Ted Key's cartoon character and the 1961–1966 TV sitcom, was scheduled for October 24–25, 2014, at the June Havoc Theatre, directed by Lucie Arnaz.

== Syndication ==
In 1966, Screen Gems announced that it would syndicate Hazel in January 1967 and that it had sold syndication packages to television stations in New York York, Los Angeles, Washington, DC, and Baltimore. Hazel was seen in syndicated reruns on some local stations, mainly during the 1970s. Since then it has occasionally aired on some stations. On cable, Hazel aired on TBS from 1980 to 1986. It also aired on TV Land in 2002–2003. In 2011, it aired on Antenna TV, and starting in 2015, it aired weekday mornings on FETV – Family Entertainment Television, GAC Family and GAC Living.

== Episodes ==
Season	Episodes	Originally released			Rank
Season	Episodes	First released	Last released	Network	Rank
1	35	September 28, 1961	June 7, 1962	NBC	#4
2	32	September 20, 1962	May 9, 1963	NBC	#15
3	32	September 19, 1963	April 23, 1964	NBC	#22
4	26	September 17, 1964	March 25, 1965	NBC	Not in top 30
5	29	September 13, 1965	April 11, 1966	CBS	Not in top 30

== Home media ==
Sony Pictures Home Entertainment released the first season of Hazel on DVD in Region 1 on August 1, 2006. On February 18, 2011, Shout! Factory announced that they had acquired the rights to the series (under license from Sony) and would be releasing season 2 on DVD in 2011. They have subsequently released seasons 2–4 on DVD. The fifth and final season was released on January 14, 2014.

DVD name	Ep#	Release date
The Complete 1st Season	35	August 1, 2006
The Complete 2nd Season	32	February 21, 2012
The Complete 3rd Season	32	May 15, 2012
The Complete 4th Season	26	December 11, 2012
The Complete 5th Season	29	January 14, 2014

== Themes and analysis ==
The first major American television sitcom that featured a maid as the lead is Beulah (1950–1953), which starred Ethel Waters, Hattie McDaniel, and finally Louise Beavers as a Black domestic worker for a white family. Hazel premiered eight years after Beulah ended, and its popular success made it a template for television sitcoms in the following years that featured domestic workers who were like family members. For example, the character of Rosie the Robot on The Jetsons, which premiered on ABC on September 23, 1962, was inspired by the character of Hazel. ABC also loosely copied the Hazel theme in the 1962–1963 series Our Man Higgins about an English butler for a suburban American family. Stanley Holloway played the lead role with Audrey Totter and Frank Maxwell. Later sitcoms featuring domestic workers include The Addams Family, The Farmer’s Daughter, Family Affair, The Brady Bunch, The Ghost and Mrs. Muir, the first season of The Doris Day Show, Nanny and the Professor, and The Courtship of Eddie’s Father.

Several episodes of the series reinforced that Hazel was a valued member of the Baxter family, not just a domestic wage laborer. Booth herself commented: "'There used to be a lot of Hazels. ... Today women seem to think they're lowering themselves to work in another woman's home. But domestic service can really be a noble way of life. There are so many lonely women who, if they could come into a home and take care of a family, would acquire a sense of being needed—which is what Hazel gets from the Baxter family." The scholar L. S. Kim underscored this interpretation: "Hazel’s job is to keep order—both literal and ideological—in the house. Though seemingly innocuous, she holds the household together: the servant, in a marginalized position, is at the same time central to marking the well-being of the nuclear family."

Although it did so in a conventional way, Hazel was also one of the first television sitcoms to address class issues (prior sitcoms that did so notably include The Honeymooners). The scholar Daniel Worden observed that “in Hazel, the domestic worker becomes the representative of labor in the suburban home, a figure for the work and wear of American capitalism.” Some episodes of the series addressed the prejudice Hazel faced from upper-class individuals who disdained her because she was a maid; she always came out on top. In fact, Screen Gems used this feature of the character to promote her appeal to broad audiences: "Housewives see in Hazel a vociferous symbol of their sex. Children instinctively recognize in her what is common to all of them, the rebellion against authority. Matrons who have had maids for years think Hazel is exactly like every maid they've ever had. Conversely, maids believe she speaks only for them. Any person who holds a job under a superior, views her as a fellow employee, saying or doing things they wish they could say or do. Anyone who revolts against the pattern, the mold, or who ever has had the desire to (and this desire is in all of us) sees something of himself in this woman."
