= Ted Key =

American cartoonist and writer

- Key with actress Shirley Booth; the latter is outfitted in the maid's uniform she wore on television as Hazel.
- Born: Theodore Keyser; August 25, 1912 Fresno, California, United States
- Died: May 3, 2008 (aged 95) Tredyffrin, Pennsylvania, United States
- Notable works: Hazel; Peabody's Improbable History
- Awards: 1977 National Cartoonists Society Newspaper Panel Award

Ted Key (born Theodore Keyser; August 25, 1912 – May 3, 2008) was an American cartoonist and writer. He is best known as the creator of the cartoon panel Hazel, which was later the basis for a television series of the same name, and also the creator of the Peabody's Improbable History animated segments.

== College to cartoons ==
Born in Fresno, California, Key was the son of Jewish Latvian immigrant Simon Keyser, who had changed his name from Katseff to Keyser, and then to "Key" during World War I. Although his family thereafter went by Key, Theodore Keyser did not legally adopt the name until the 1950s. Attending the University of California, Berkeley, Key became the art editor of the student newspaper, The Daily Californian, and was associate editor of the campus humor magazine, the California Pelican and was a member of the Pi Lambda Phi fraternity. After graduating from college in 1933, Key relocated to New York City, where he published cartoons and illustrations in a number of periodicals, including Better Homes and Gardens, Collier's, The New Yorker, Ladies' Home Journal, Good Housekeeping, McCall's, Cosmopolitan, TV Guide, Mademoiselle, Look, and Judge. Key also worked as associate editor of Judge in 1937.

== Hazel ==

Key's most famous creation, the single-panel Hazel, about a wry and bossy household maid, came to Key in 1943 in a dream that he drew the next morning and sent to The Saturday Evening Post, where it was accepted and began running regularly. He soon afterward gave the character a name and employment at the Baxter household. In 2008, the cartoonist's son, Peter Key, said, "He picked the name Hazel out of the air, but there was an editor at The Post who had a sister named Hazel. She thought her brother came up with the name, and she didn’t speak to him for two years."

The cartoon ran until the weekly magazine ceased publication in 1969. Hazel was then picked up for newspaper syndication by King Features Syndicate. With the increased output of six cartoons a week, Key hired veteran gag cartoonist Stan Fine to lend a hand.

Key later adapted his comic panel into the television show Hazel, starring Shirley Booth as the titular maid. It ran from 1961 to 1964 on NBC; for its final 1965 season, the show switched to CBS. Key continued to draw the strip until his retirement in 1993. King Features reprints panels in over 50 newspapers as of 2008.

== Films and television ==
Key's other work in the comics field includes Diz and Liz, a two-page feature that ran in Jack and Jill magazine from 1961 to 1972, as well as conceiving and creating Peabody's Improbable History, the original Peabody segment for producer Jay Ward's animated television series The Rocky and Bullwinkle Show. Key also provided illustrations for the long-running "Positive Attitude" series of motivational pamphlets and posters, published biweekly by Economics Press Inc. from the 1960s to the 1980s.

== Radio ==
Key also wrote radio plays during the 1930s and 1940s. His radio drama, The Clinic, broadcast on NBC, was chosen for Max Wylie's Best Broadcasts of 1939-40 anthology.

== Other works ==
He was the screenwriter for three Disney films (The Cat from Outer Space, Million Dollar Duck, and Gus), and he created several classic children's books, including Phyllis and The Biggest Dog in the World (later adapted into the film Digby, the Biggest Dog in the World).

== Personal life ==
During World War II, Key served with the U.S. Army from 1943 to 1946, primarily in public relations, where he wrote a play aimed at recruiting women into military service. Key retired in 1993, but King Features continued to syndicate Hazel using material he had prepared for his retirement. Hazel still runs today in some 50 newspapers.

Diagnosed with bladder cancer in late 2006, Key suffered a stroke in September 2007. He was 95 at the time of his death in Tredyffrin Township, Pennsylvania. Key was married twice; his first wife, Anne, died in 1984, and Key was survived by second wife Bonnie and by three sons: Stephen, David, and Peter.

== Awards ==
In 1977, Key received the National Cartoonists Society Newspaper Panel Award for his work on Hazel.

== Bibliography ==
- Many Happy Returns (1951)
- So'm I (1954)
- Fasten Your Seat Belts!: A New Album of Cartoons (1956)
- Phyllis (1957)
- The Biggest Dog in the World (1960)
- Ted Key's Diz and Liz (1966)
- The Cat From Outer Space (1978)
- Love Is the Reason for It All: The Shirley Booth Story (Foreword, plus information on Hazel, 2008)
