= Allan Manings =

American television producer and writer (1924-2010)

- Born: March 28, 1924; Newark, New Jersey, U.S.
- Died: May 12, 2010 (aged 86); Beverly Hills, California, U.S.
- Occupations: American television producer, comedy writer
- Spouse: Whitney Blake (m. 1968; died 2002)
- Writing career
- Years active: 1958-1998

Allan Manings (March 28, 1924 – May 12, 2010) was an American television producer and comedy writer. He was active in the 1950s, 1960s, 1970s and 1980s and was best known for his work in co-creating with his wife, actress Whitney Blake, One Day at a Time, as well as serving as producer (and later executive producer) of the Bud Yorkin-Norman Lear Tandem show, Good Times.

Manings was born in Newark, New Jersey, to a Jewish family, and was raised on Staten Island. He served in the United States Army during World War II in the Pacific theater. After completing his military service, he went to college on the GI Bill as one of the first men to attend the newly coeducational Sarah Lawrence College. Manings felt uneasy during the McCarthyist period, during which time several friends were blacklisted, and moved to Canada until the early 1960s.

He worked as a writer and script supervisor on Rowan & Martin's Laugh-In in the 1960s, for which he received an Emmy. He also wrote episodes of McHale's Navy and Leave It to Beaver.

== Writers Guild of America Service ==
Manings was elected vice president of the Writers Guild of America, West from 1975 to 1977 and also served as a member of its board of directors from 1977 to 1982 and again from 1985 to 1992. He ran unsuccessfully for president of the Guild in 1991 and was a recipient of the Morgan Cox Award for service to the Guild, which he received in 1997.

== Personal life ==
Manings was married to actress/producer Whitney Blake (1926–2002), best known for her role co-starring in the 1960s sitcom Hazel, and the stepfather of Blake's daughter, actress Meredith Baxter.

He died on May 12, 2010, aged 86, in Beverly Hills, California of a heart attack in addition to esophageal cancer from which he was suffering and had been receiving medical treatment.

== Sources ==
- Manings, Allan (February 14, 1977). Allan Manings, an American Film Institute Seminar on His Work. Microfilming Corp. of America. ASIN B0007B6UF6.
- Rutherford, Paul (1990). When Television Was Young: Primetime Canada 1952–1967. University of Toronto Press. p. 89. ISBN 0-8020-6647-X.
