= Hogan's Daughter =

American radio situation comedy series (1949)

Hogan's Daughter is an American radio situation comedy that was broadcast on NBC from June 21, 1949, until September 14, 1949.

== Overview ==
Phyllis Hogan lived with her parents, Tom and Kate Hogan, in an apartment on East 53rd Street in Manhattan. Phyllis attended the Dalgrim Business School and wanted to become a secretary, but her efforts to secure employment were unsuccessful. She was "a delicate flower blooming among the tin cans and rattling trolleys" around her family's apartment. Tom had actual difficulties with his neighbors and imaginary difficulties with a ghost. Kate was the family's "cynical but stable keel".

Episodes of the series focused on Phyllis's "efforts to overcome the causes of aggravation in her life". In addition to Phyllis's parents, characters regularly heard on the show were television repairman Marvin Gaffney, her boyfriend, and Laverne, her confidante, who was "constantly arranging new dates and new jobs" for Phyllis".

== Cast ==
Cast of Hogan's Daughter
| Character | Actor |
|---|---|
| Phyllis Hogan | Shirley Booth |
| Tom Hogan | Howard Smith |
| Kate Hogan | Betty Garde |
| Marvin Gaffney | Everett Sloane |
| Laverne | Betty Garde |
| Announcer | Ken Roberts |
| Commercial spokesperson | Johnny Roventini |

== Production ==
Hogan's Daughter was broadcast at 8 p.m. Eastern Time, replacing This Is Your Life. Bill McCaffrey was the producer. John Whedon and Sam Moore wrote the program, and Moore was the director. Bernard Green provided music. Philip Morris cigarettes sponsored the show. As late as mid-August 1949, Hogan's Daughter was "still in the mix" to continue on the air when the fall season began. Support for it waned, however, and it did not appear when NBC's fall 1949 schedule was completed.

== Critical response ==
Val Adams, writing in The New York Times, singled out Booth's work as the "one pleasant quality noted in the show" and called Sloane's acting "commendably restrained for this type of program". The review said that the show's story line needed to be "plausible and centered directly on the solid character which Miss Booth plays." In contrast to that goal, Adams cited a recent episode that focused on a parody of radio programs that gave away prizes. It was "too long drawn out and became more irritating than the real thing", the review said, with the result that "the rest of the show lost all elements of pleasant listening."

A review in the trade publication Variety commended the performances of the show's actors but said that "while the atmosphere was true-to-life the pacing seemed somewhat pedestrian". The reviewer suggested using "more punchy lines".

Media critic John Crosby wrote that Hogan's Daughter "isn't funny. I don't mean it isn't terribly funny. I mean it isn't funny at all. In fact, it's pretty grim." He noted that Booth, Sloane, Garde, and Smith were all good actors, but "In spite of all this talent and what seems a great deal of effort ... the program doesn't add up to anything at all."

== Television adaptation ==
Whedon wrote "Hogan's Daughter", an episode of Plymouth Playhouse that was presented on ABC-TV on May 17, 1953. A review in Variety said that the episode demonstrated a decline in quality from the five previous broadcasts of Plymouth Playhouse. It complimented the acting of Sheila Bond as the daughter, Joshua Shelley as her boyfriend, and Pat Harrington as her father, but it said that Whedon's script lacked development, which "stymied proceedings from the start". As a result, "all words and no action made for a dullish half-hour".
