= Great Movies (TV series) =

- Presented by: Fred Davis
- Country of origin: Canada
- Original language: English
- No. of seasons: 14

Production
- Running time: 90–120 minutes

Original release
- Network: CBC Television
- Release: 20 April 1957 – 3 October 1970

Great Movies is a Canadian series of mid-season feature films that aired on CBC Television from 1957 to 1970.

== Premise ==
CBC broadcast feature films as replacement programming for Hockey Night in Canada during the months when the NHL was not playing. Fred Davis hosted the movies in 1957, 1958 and 1959.

== Scheduling ==
The series was broadcast on Saturday nights, either from 8:30 or 9:00 p.m. (Eastern) since 20 April 1957. The movies were broadcast each mid-year until the final movie in this series aired on 3 October 1970. Movies under this title were also broadcast late Friday nights from April to October 1961.

For the 1962 season, the mid-year movies were branded with the title Front Row Centre, reverting to the Great Movies banner in 1963.

== Reception ==
The Great Movies concept was deemed successful, with July 1961 ratings indicating that the viewership ranked fourth place.
