= Ray Fulmer =

American actor (1933–2013)

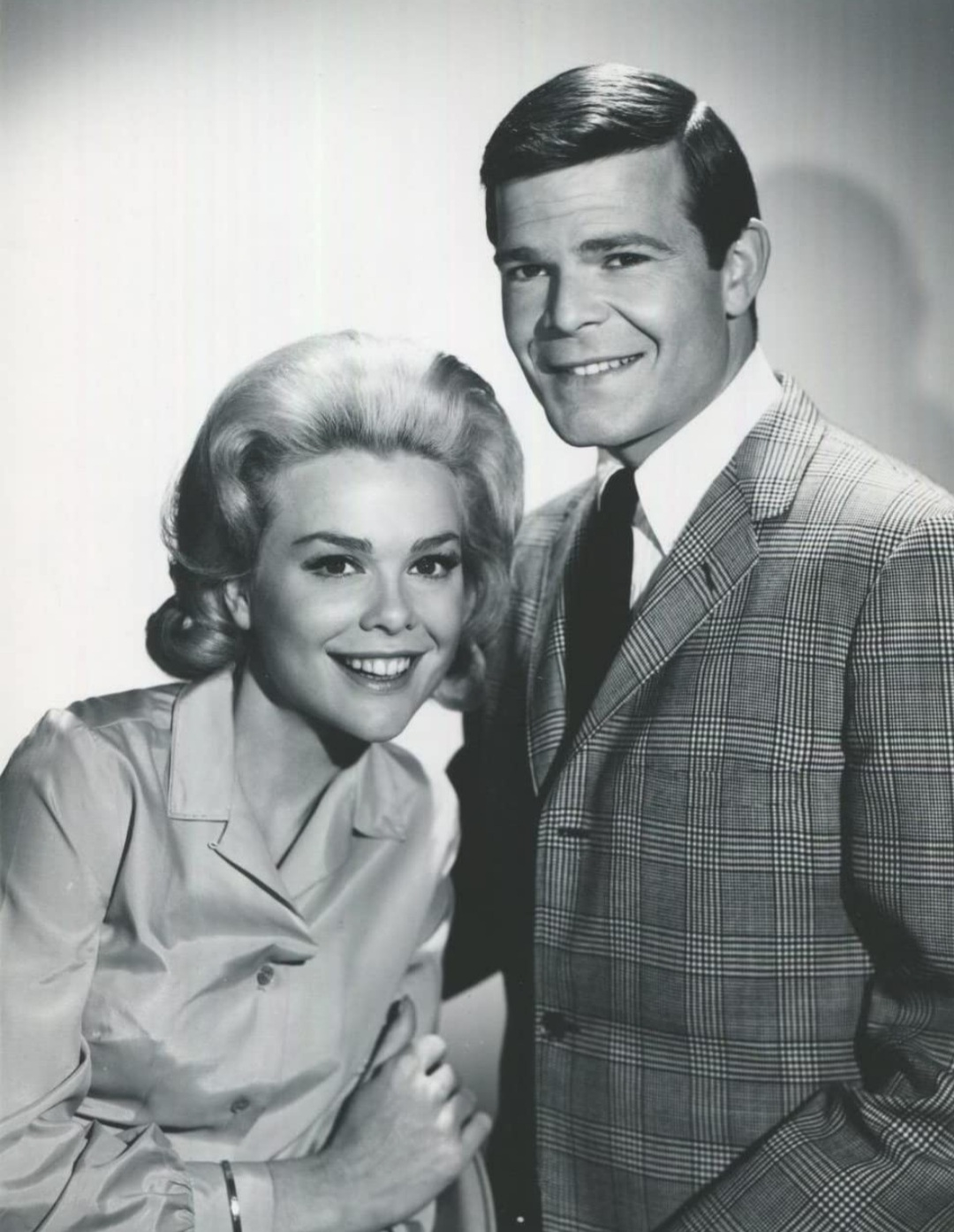
- Fulmer (right) with Lynn Borden in Hazel, 1965
- Born: Raymond Stover Fulmer; February 17, 1933; Philadelphia, Pennsylvania, U.S.
- Died: February 6, 2013 (aged 79); Newport Beach, California, U.S.
- Occupation: Actor
- Years active: 1956–1992

Raymond Stover Fulmer (February 17, 1933 – February 6, 2013) was an American actor. He was best known for playing Steve Baxter in the final season of the American sitcom television series Hazel.

== Life and career ==
Raymond Stover Fulmer was born in Philadelphia, Pennsylvania on February 17, 1933. He attended Girard College, Penn Charter and Boston College. He was drafted into the U.S. Army in 1953, serving in Germany until 1955. While in the army he became interested in theatre, and after discharge he moved to New York City to study at the American Theatre Wing, supporting himself with small roles on television and modelling for fashion advertisements. In 1957 Fulmer joined the cast of the Broadway play Auntie Mame, playing the role of Patrick Dennis. He also appeared in the 1968 Broadway comedy Happiness Is Just a Little Thing Called a Rolls Royce.

Fulmer played Steve Baxter, a real estate agent, husband of Barbara Baxter (Lynn Borden) and father of Susie Baxter (Julia Benjamin) in the final season of Hazel. After the series ended in 1966, Fulmer played the roles of Lee Gantry in the soap opera Guiding Light and Martin Nell Dillard in Somerset. He retired in 1992, last appearing in the television series The New WKRP in Cincinnati.

== Death ==
Fulmer died on February 6, 2013, at the age of 79.
