= The Saturday Evening Post =

American mainstream weekly magazine

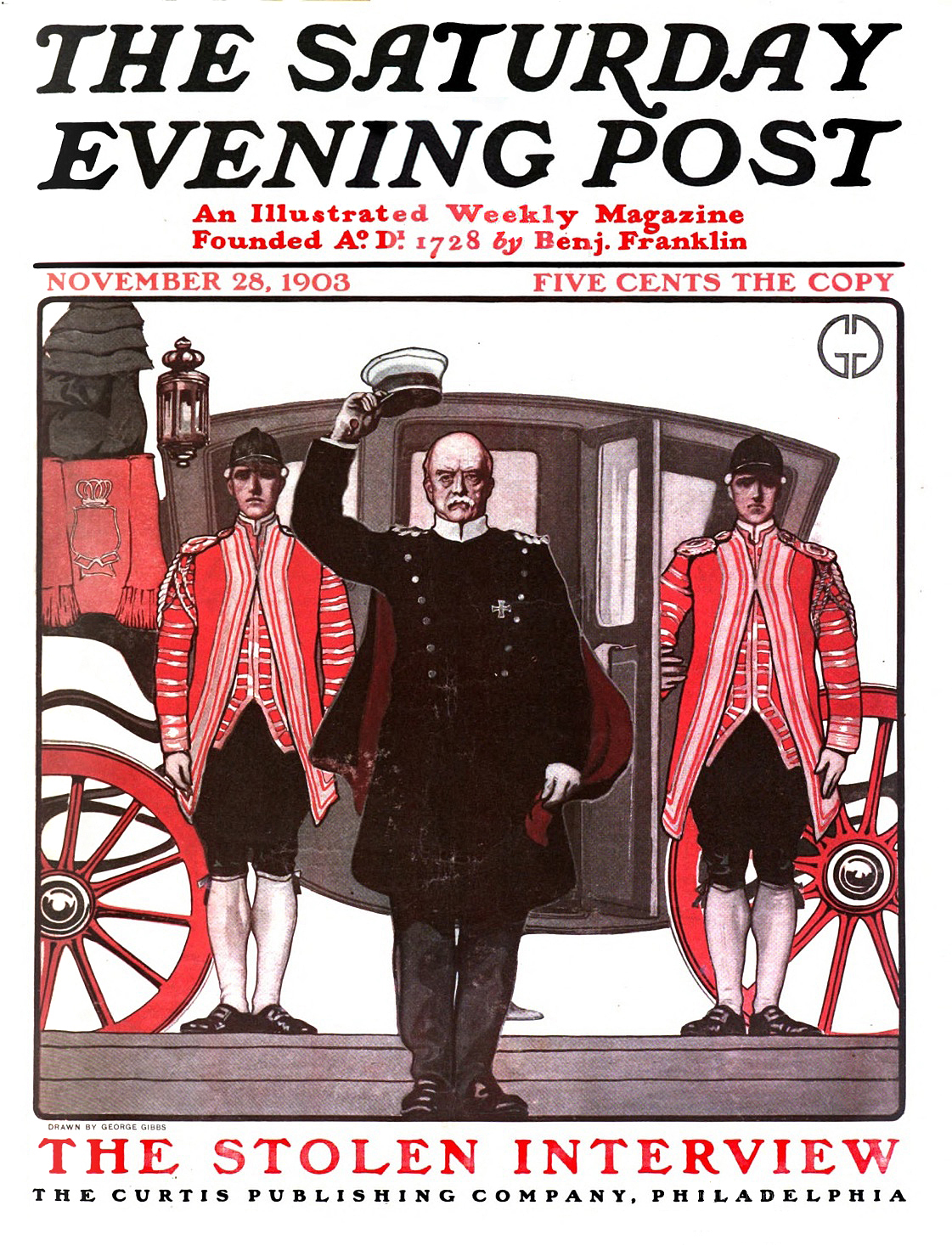
- Cover of the issue from November 28, 1903, featuring Otto von Bismarck, illustrated by George Fort Gibbs
- Frequency: Bimonthly
- Publisher: Saturday Evening Post Society; Curtis Publishing Co. (1897–1969)
- Total circulation: 237907 (December 2018)
- First issue: August 4, 1821
- Company: Saturday Evening Post Society
- Country: United States
- Based in: Indianapolis, Indiana, U.S.
- Language: English
- Website: saturdayeveningpost.com
- ISSN: 0048-9239

The Saturday Evening Post is an American magazine published six times a year. It was first published in 1821, and published weekly from 1897 until 1963. It was published every other week until 1969. From the 1920s to the 1960s, it was one of the most widely circulated and influential magazines among the American middle class, with fiction, nonfiction, cartoons, and features that reached two million homes every week.

In the 1960s, the magazine's readership began to decline. In 1969, The Saturday Evening Post folded for two years before being revived as a quarterly publication with an emphasis on medical articles in 1971.

As of the late 2000s, The Saturday Evening Post is published by the Saturday Evening Post Society, which purchased the magazine in 1982. The magazine was redesigned in 2013.

== History ==
=== 19th century ===
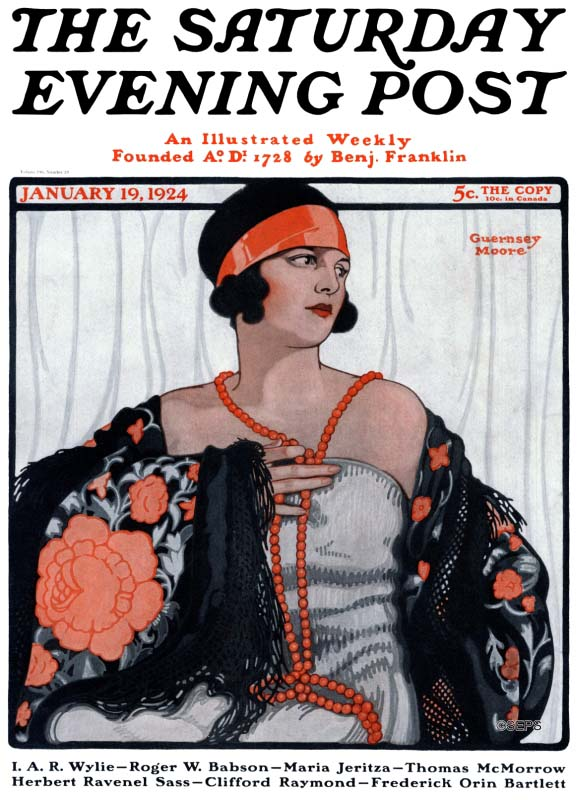
Cover of the issue from January 19, 1924

The Saturday Evening Post was first published in 1821 in the same printing shop at 53 Market Street in Philadelphia, where the Benjamin Franklin-founded Pennsylvania Gazette was published in the 18th century. While the Gazette ceased publication in 1800, ten years after Franklin's death, the Post links its history to the original magazine.

Cyrus H. K. Curtis, publisher of the Ladies' Home Journal, bought the Post for $1,000 in 1897. Under the ownership of the Curtis Publishing Company, the Post grew to become the most widely circulated weekly magazine in the United States. The magazine gained prominent status under the leadership of its longtime editor George Horace Lorimer (1899–1937).

The Saturday Evening Post published current event articles, editorials, human interest pieces, humor, illustrations, a letter column, poetry with contributions submitted by readers, single-panel gag cartoons, including Hazel by Ted Key, and stories by leading writers of the time. It was known for commissioning lavish illustrations and original works of fiction. Illustrations were featured on the cover and embedded in stories and advertising. Some Post illustrations continue to be reproduced as posters or prints, especially those by Norman Rockwell.

=== 20th century ===
In 1929, at the beginning of the Mexican Repatriation, The Saturday Evening Post ran a series on the racial inferiority of Mexicans.

In 1954, it published its first articles on the role of the U.S. in deposing Mohammad Mosaddegh, Prime Minister of Iran, in 1953. The article was based on materials leaked by CIA director Allen Dulles.

The Post readership began to decline in the late 1950s and 1960s. In general, the decline of general interest magazines was blamed on television, which competed for advertisers and readers' attention. The Post had problems retaining readers: the public's taste in fiction was changing, and the Post's conservative politics and values appealed to a declining number of people. Content by popular writers became harder to obtain. Prominent authors drifted away to newer magazines offering more money and status. As a result, the Post published more articles on current events and cut costs by replacing illustrations with photographs for covers and advertisements.

In 1967, the magazine's publisher, Curtis Publishing Company, lost a landmark defamation suit, Curtis Publishing Co. v. Butts, 388 U.S. 130 (1967), resulting from an article, and was ordered to pay $3,060,000 in damages to the plaintiff. The Post article implied that football coaches Paul "Bear" Bryant and Wally Butts conspired to fix a game between the University of Alabama and the University of Georgia. Both coaches sued Curtis Publishing Co. for defamation, each initially asking for $10 million. Bryant eventually settled for $300,000 while Butts' case went to the Supreme Court, which held that libel damages may be recoverable (in this instance against a news organization) when the injured party is a non-public official, if the plaintiff can prove that the defendant was guilty of a reckless lack of professional standards when examining allegations for reasonable credibility. (Butts was eventually awarded $460,000.)

William Emerson was promoted to editor-in-chief in 1965 and remained in the position until the magazine's demise in 1969.

In 1968, Martin Ackerman, a specialist in troubled firms, became president of Curtis after lending it $5M. With the magazine still in dire financial straits, Ackerman announced that Curtis would reduce printing costs by cancelling the subscriptions of roughly half of its readers. Those who lost their subscriptions were offered a free transfer to a subscription to Life magazine; Life publisher Time Inc. paid Curtis $5M for the exchange, easing the company's mounting debts. The move was also widely seen as an opportunity for Curtis to abandon older and more rural readers, who were less valuable to the Post's advertisers. Columnist Art Buchwald lampooned the decision, suggesting that "if the Saturday Evening Post considered you a deadbeat, you didn't have much choice but to either pretend you were still getting the magazine and live a lie, or move out of the neighborhood before anyone found out."

These last-ditch efforts failed to save the magazine, and Curtis announced in January 1969 that the February 8 issue would be the magazine's last. Ackerman stated that the magazine had lost $5M in 1968 and would lose a projected $3M in 1969. In a meeting with employees after the magazine's closure had been announced, Emerson thanked the staff for their professional work and promised "to stay here and see that everyone finds a job".

At a March 1969 post-mortem on the magazine's closing, Emerson stated that The Post "was a damn good vehicle for advertising" with competitive renewal rates and readership reports and expressed what The New York Times called "understandable bitterness" in wishing "that all the one-eyed critics will lose their other eye". Otto Friedrich, the magazine's last managing editor, blamed the death of The Post on Curtis. In his Decline and Fall (Harper & Row, 1970), an account of the magazine's final years (1962–69), he argued that corporate management was unimaginative and incompetent. Friedrich acknowledges that The Post faced challenges while the tastes of American readers changed over the course of the 1960s, but he insisted that the magazine maintained a standard of good quality and was appreciated by readers.

In 1970, control of the debilitated Curtis Publishing Company was acquired from the estate of Cyrus Curtis by Indianapolis industrialist Beurt SerVaas. SerVaas relaunched the Post the following year on a quarterly basis as a kind of nostalgia magazine.

In early 1982, ownership of the Post was transferred to the Benjamin Franklin Literary and Medical Society, founded in 1976 by the Post's then-editor, Corena "Cory" SerVaas (wife of Beurt SerVaas). The magazine's core focus was now health and medicine; indeed, the magazine's website originally noted that the "credibility of The Saturday Evening Post has made it a valuable asset for reaching medical consumers and for helping medical researchers obtain family histories. In the magazine, national health surveys are taken to further current research on topics such as cancer, diabetes, high blood pressure, heart disease, ulcerative colitis, spina bifida, and bipolar disorder."

By 1991, Curtis Publishing Company had been renamed Curtis International, a subsidiary of SerVaas Inc., and had become an importer of audiovisual equipment.

=== 21st century ===
With the January/February 2013 issue, the Post launched a major makeover of the publication, including a new cover design and efforts to increase the magazine's profile, in response to a general public misbelief that it was no longer in existence. The magazine's new logo is an update of a logo it had used beginning in 1942. As of October 2018, the complete archive of the magazine is available online. As of 2021, the Saturday Evening Post Society, a 501(c)(3) non-profit organization head by SerVaas, owned the magazine. An editorial staff of twelve put out six issues a year with circulation of 350,000. In 2026, the magazine announced it will cease its print edition and continue to publish online only. At that time it had 50,000 subscribers.

== Legacy ==
=== Illustrations ===
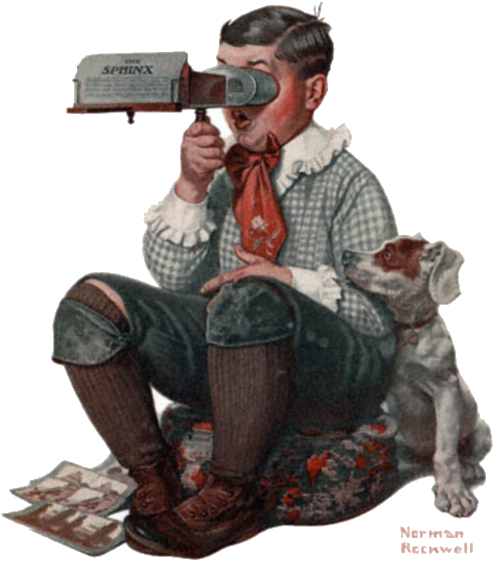
A Norman Rockwell Post cover illustration in January 1922

In 1916, Saturday Evening Post editor George Horace Lorimer discovered Norman Rockwell, then an unknown 22-year-old New York City artist. Lorimer promptly purchased two illustrations from Rockwell, using them as covers, and commissioned three more drawings. Rockwell's illustrations of the American family and rural life of a bygone era became icons. During his 50-year career with the Post, Rockwell painted more than 300 covers.

The Post also employed Nebraska artist John Philip Falter, who became known as "a painter of Americana with an accent of the Middle West," who "brought out some of the homeliness and humor of Middle Western town life and home life." He produced 120 covers for the Post between 1943 and 1968, ceasing only when the magazine began displaying photographs on its covers.

Another prominent artist was Charles R. Chickering, a freelance illustrator who went on to design numerous postage stamps for the U.S. Post Office. Other popular cover illustrators include artists George Hughes, Constantin Alajalov, John Clymer, Alonzo Kimball, W. H. D. Koerner, J. C. Leyendecker, Mead Schaeffer, Charles Archibald MacLellan, John E. Sheridan, Emmett Watson, Douglass Crockwell, Jacob Bates Abbott, and N. C. Wyeth.

Cartoonists have included: Irwin Caplan, Clyde Lamb, Jerry Marcus, Frank O'Neal, Charles M. Schulz, and Bill Yates. The magazine ran Ted Key's cartoon panel series Hazel from 1943 to 1969.

=== Literature ===
Each issue featured several original short stories and often included an installment of a serial appearing in successive issues. Most of the fiction was written for mainstream tastes by popular writers, but some literary writers were featured. The opening pages of stories featured paintings by the leading magazine illustrators.

The Post published stories and essays by H. E. Bates, Ray Bradbury, Kay Boyle, Agatha Christie, Brian Cleeve, Eleanor Franklin Egan, William Faulkner, F. Scott Fitzgerald, C. S. Forester, Ernest Haycox, Robert A. Heinlein, Kurt Vonnegut, Paul Gallico, Normand Poirier, Hammond Innes, Louis L'Amour, Sinclair Lewis, Joseph C. Lincoln, John P. Marquand, Edgar Allan Poe, Mary Roberts Rinehart, Sax Rohmer, William Saroyan, John Steinbeck, Rex Stout, Rob Wagner, Edith Wharton, and P.G. Wodehouse.

Poetry published came from poets including: Carl Sandburg, Ogden Nash, Dorothy Parker, and Hannah Kahn.

Jack London's best-known novel The Call of the Wild was first published, in serialized form, in the Saturday Evening Post in 1903.

Emblematic of the Post's fiction was author Clarence Budington Kelland, who first appeared in 1916–17 with stories of homespun heroes, "Efficiency Edgar" and "Scattergood Baines". Kelland was a steady presence from 1922 until 1961.

For many years William Hazlett Upson contributed a series of short stories about Earthworm Tractors salesman Alexander Botts.

Publication in the Post launched careers and helped established artists and writers stay afloat. P. G. Wodehouse said "the wolf was always at the door" until the Post gave him his "first break" in 1915 by serializing Something New.

== Politics ==
After the election of Franklin D. Roosevelt, Post columnist Garet Garrett became a vocal critic of the New Deal. Garrett accused the Roosevelt administration of initiating socialist strategies.

After Lorimer died, Garrett became editorial writer-in-chief and criticized the Roosevelt administration's support of the United Kingdom and efforts to prepare to enter World War II, and allegedly showed some support for Adolf Hitler in some of his editorials. Garrett's positions aroused controversy and may have cost the Post readers and advertisers in the aftermath of Pearl Harbor.

== Editors ==
(Listed from the purchase by Curtis, 1898)

- William George Jordan (1898–99)
- George Horace Lorimer (1899–1937)
- Wesley Winans Stout (1937–1942)
- Ben Hibbs (1942–1962)
- Robert Fuoss (1962)
- Robert Sherrod (1962)
- Clay Blair Jr. (1962–1964)
- William Emerson (1965–1969)
- Beurt SerVaas (1971–1975)
- Cory SerVaas, M.D. (1975–2008)
- Joan SerVaas (2008–2009)
- Patrick Perry (2009)
- Stephen C. George (2009–10)
- Steven Slon (2012–2022)
- Patrick Perry (2022–present)

== Other notable staff ==
- Jane Nickerson
- Joan Didion

== Cover gallery ==
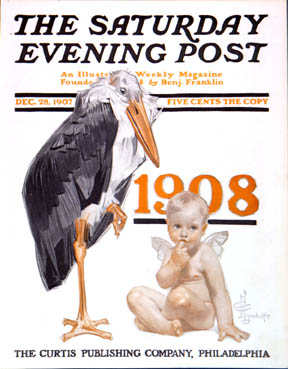
December 28, 1907. Cover by J. C. Leyendecker

April 16, 1910. Cover by Anton Otto Fischer

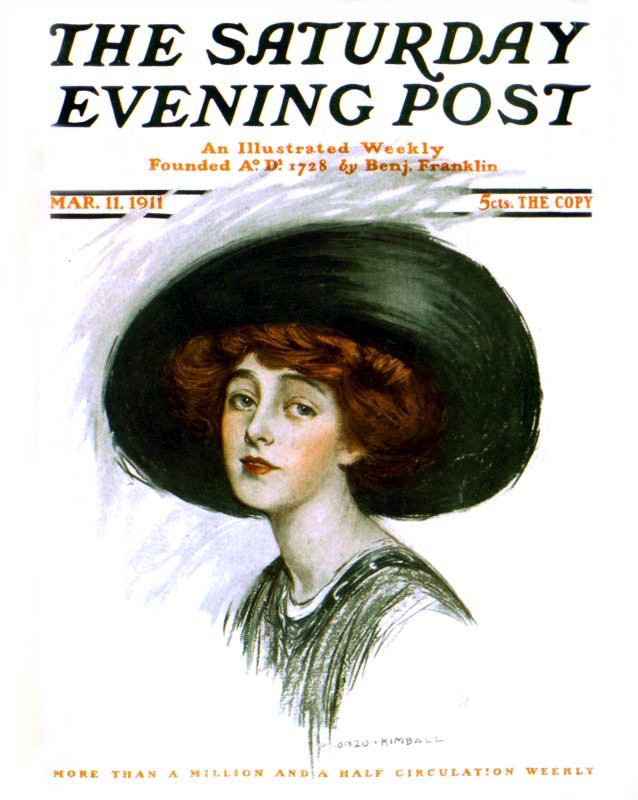
March 11, 1911. Cover by Alonzo Myron Kimball

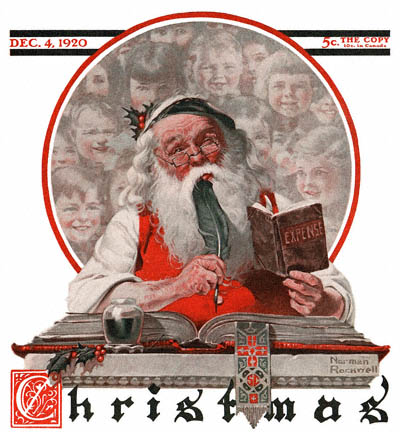
December 4, 1920. Cover by Norman Rockwell

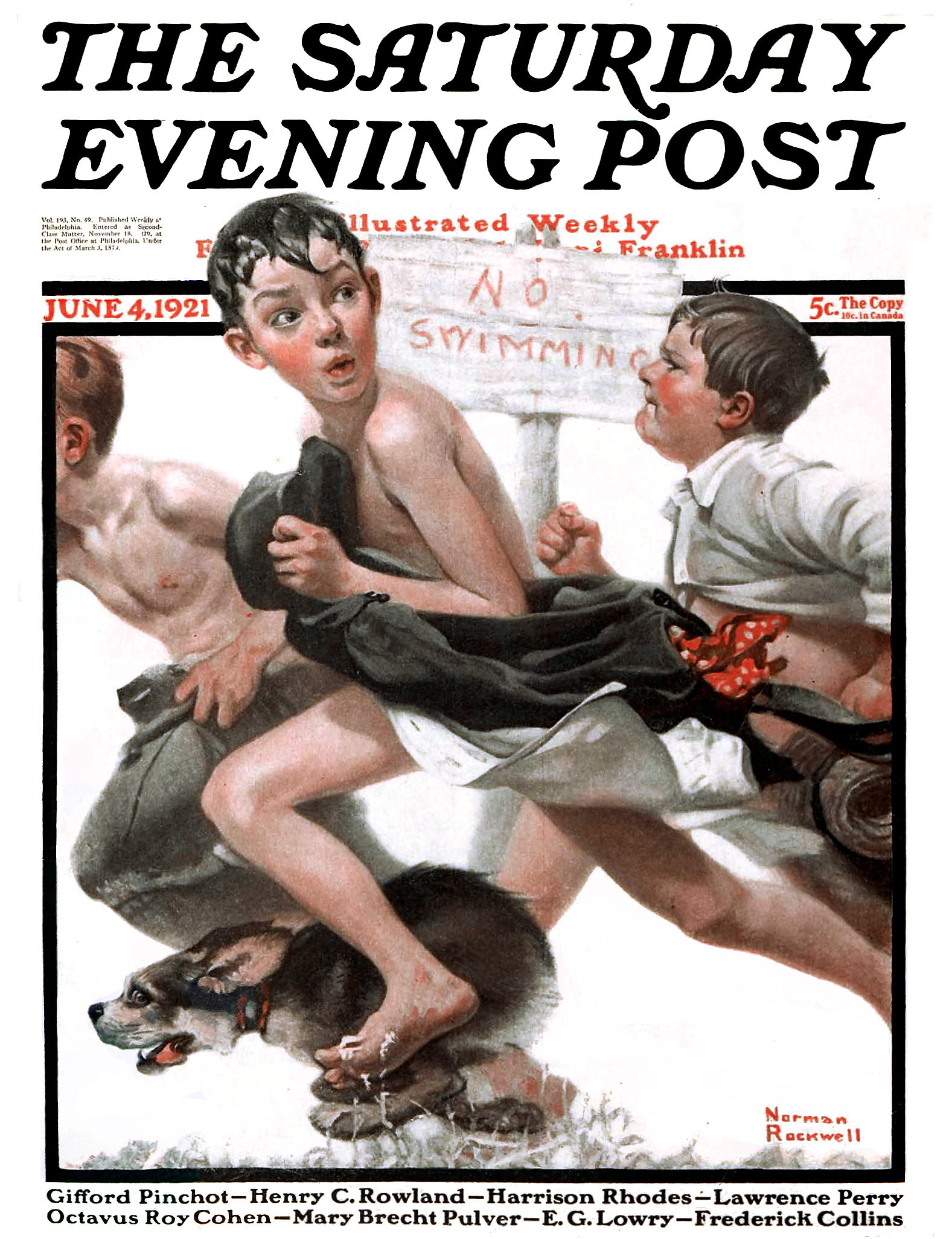
June 4, 1921. Cover by Norman Rockwell

== See also ==
- Constantin Alajalov
- Cyrus Curtis
- John Philip Falter
- Anton Otto Fischer
- Garet Garrett
- Ladies' Home Journal
- J. C. Leyendecker
- Norman Rockwell
- John E. Sheridan (illustrator)
- Harry Simmons
- Frank Glasgow Tinker
- Edmund Ward

=== Similar magazines ===
- Collier's
- Harper's Weekly
- Liberty
- Life
- Look
- Reader's Digest (still in publication)
