= Lynn Borden =

American actress (1937–2015)

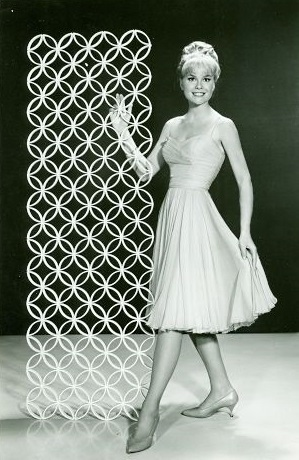
- Borden on CBS, 1962
- Born: Lynn Marie Freyse; March 24, 1937; Detroit, Michigan, U.S.
- Died: March 3, 2015 (aged 77); Encino, California, U.S.
- Education: University of Arizona
- Occupations: Film and television actress
- Years active: 1962–2006
- Spouses: Chris Borden (m. 1958; div. 1963) Roger Brunelle (m. 1982)
- Father: Bill Freyse

Lynn Marie Freyse (March 24, 1937 – March 3, 2015) was an American film and television actress. She was best known for playing Barbara Baxter in the final season of the American sitcom television series Hazel.

== Life and career ==
Borden was born in Detroit, Michigan, the daughter of Evelyn and Bill Freyse, a cartoonist, and raised in Tucson, Arizona. Borden attended the University of Arizona, where she performed in theatre and studied drama and psychology. Borden graduated with a bachelor's degree in 1958. In 1957 she had won the Miss Arizona pageant and been a runner-up in the Miss America Pageant.

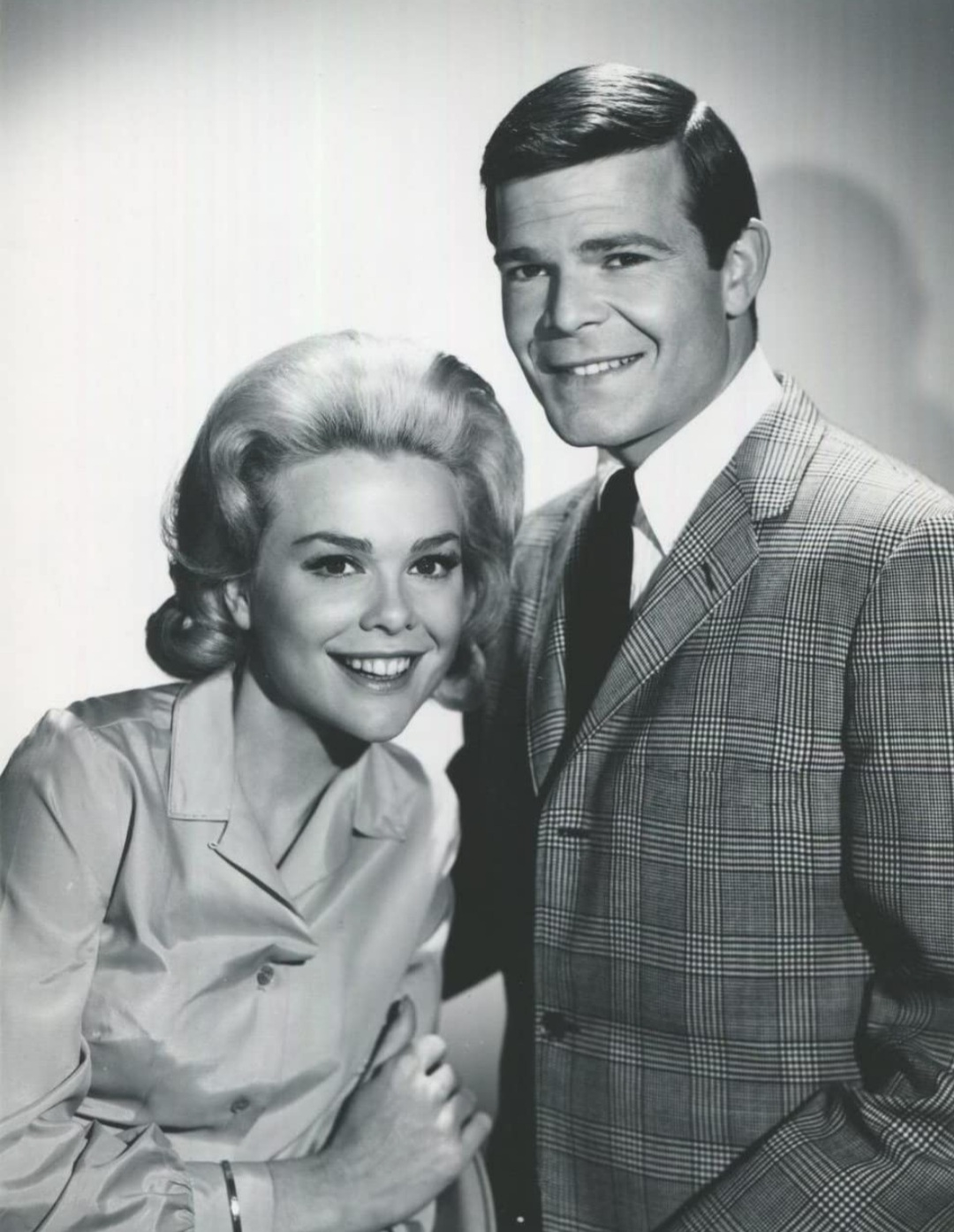
Borden (left) with Ray Fulmer in Hazel, 1965

Borden began her screen career in 1962 with an uncredited role as a party guest in the film Days of Wine and Roses. In 1965 she was cast as Barbara Baxter for the final season of Hazel. After the series ended in 1966 Borden appeared in other television programs, including The Fugitive, Get Smart, Fantasy Island and The Dick Van Dyke Show. She also starred and co-starred in films such as Bob & Carol & Ted & Alice, Frogs, Black Mama White Mama, Walking Tall, Dirty Mary Crazy Larry and Savannah Smiles. Borden retired in 2006, last appearing in the police procedural television series CSI: NY.

== Personal life ==
Borden married Chris Borden in 1958. They divorced in 1963. Borden married Roger Brunelle in 1982, the marriage lasting until her death in 2015.

== Death ==
Borden died on March 3, 2015 after an extended illness in Encino, California, at the age of 77.
