= Julia Benjamin =

American actress

- Born: February 21, 1957 (age 68); Los Angeles, California, U.S.
- Occupation: Actress
- Years active: 1965–1984

Julia Benjamin (born February 21, 1957) is a retired American film and television actress of the 1960s, 1970s and 1980s. She is best remembered for her character role as Susie Baxter, the daughter of Steve and Barbara Baxter on the 1960s sitcom Hazel. Benjamin's career began at the age of eight in 1965 on Hazel. Benjamin was also well known for her roles in the movies Mr. and Mrs. Bo Jo Jones (1971) and The Jordan Chance (1978).

After Hazel went off the air, Benjamin would have only five roles in movies and television. Her television credits include three guest starring roles on the television shows My Three Sons, The Rockford Files and Riptide. Riptide was Benjamin's last acting appearance.

== Filmography ==
- Hazel (1965–1966) Susie Baxter
- My Three Sons (1967–1969) Margaret Crookshank/Donna (Uncredited)
- Mr and Mrs Bo Jo Jones (1971) Grace
- The Rockford Files (1978) Bonny/Melinda
- The Jordan Chance (1978) Girl
- Riptide (1984) Nurse Fiske
