= List of UK top-ten singles in 1956 =

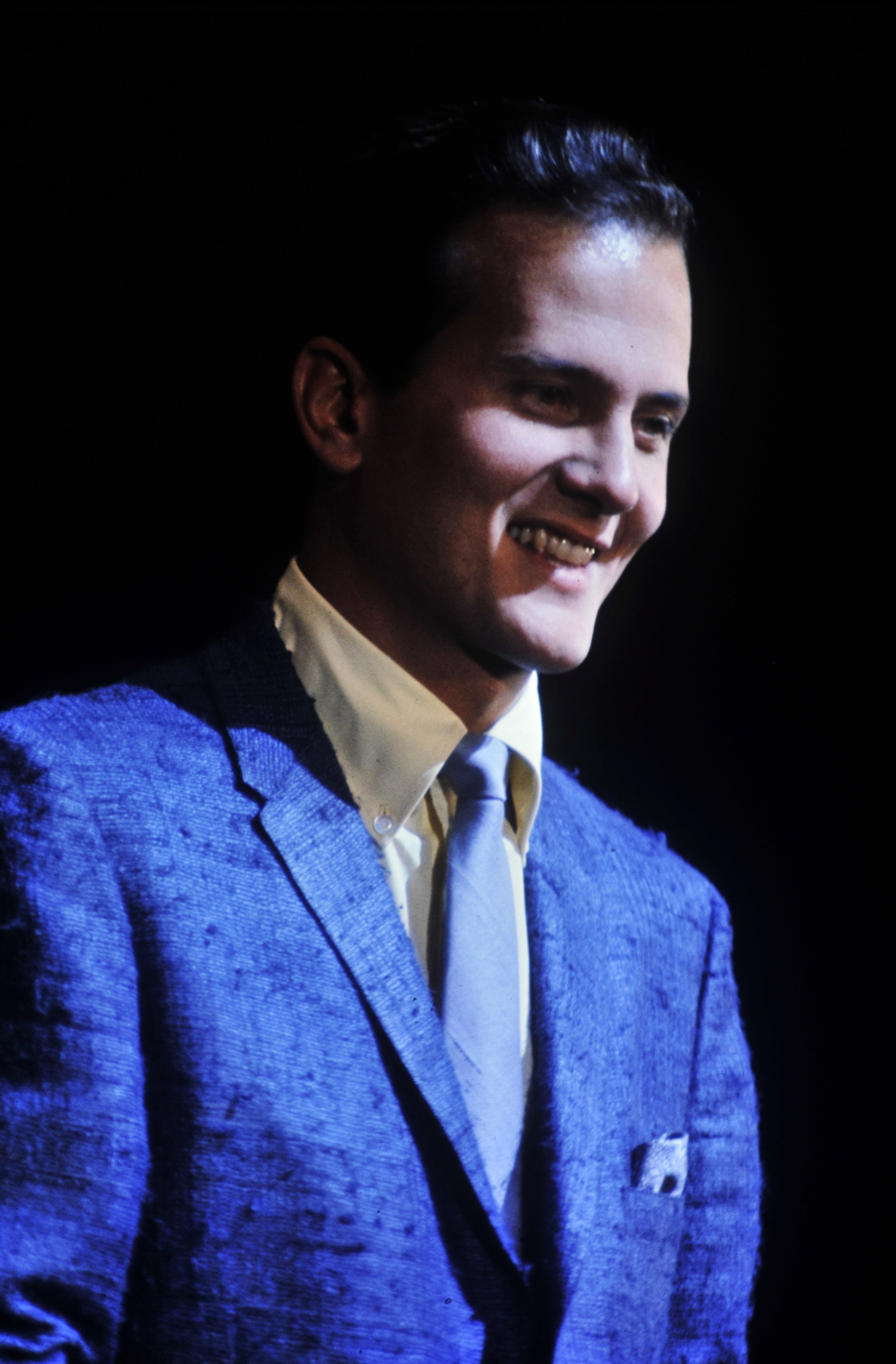
Pat Boone (pictured in 1960) had the best-selling single of 1956 with "I'll Be Home", which topped the charts for five weeks and spent seventeen weeks in the top 10.

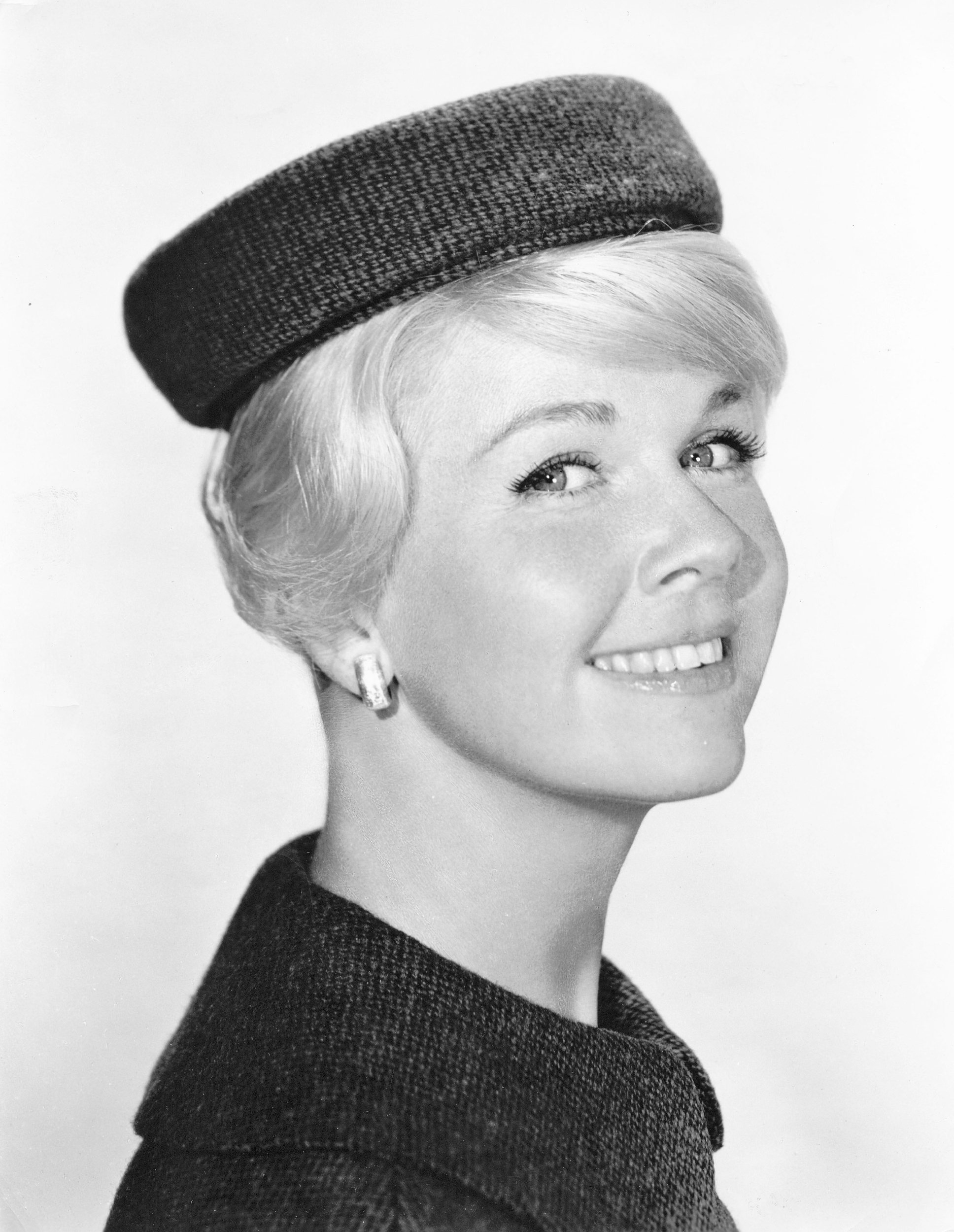
Doris Day achieved her second and final UK number-one single this year with the Academy Award-winning song from the film The Man Who Knew Too Much, "Que Sera, Sera (Whatever Will Be, Will Be)".

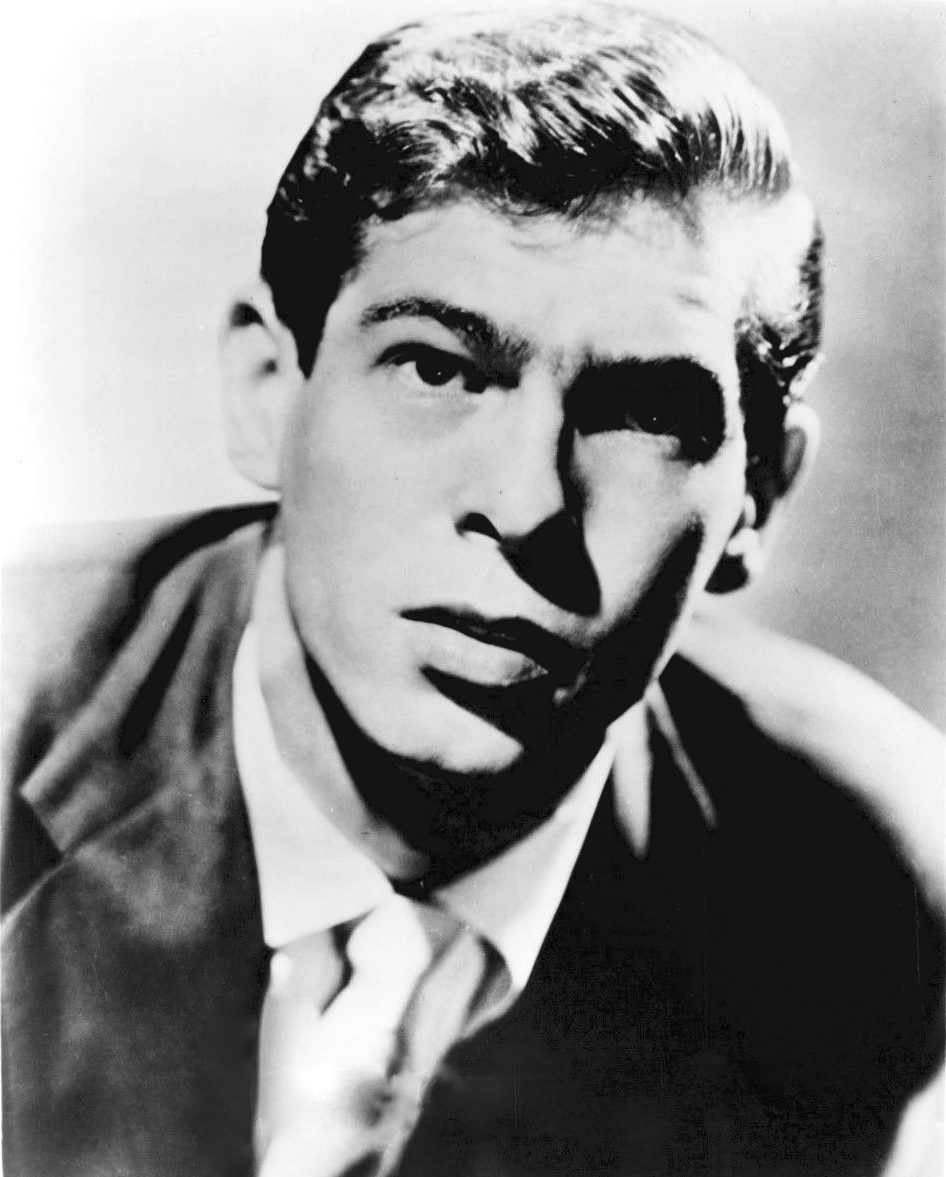
In November 1956, Johnnie Ray scored the second of his three UK number-one singles with "Just Walkin' in the Rain", which topped the chart for seven weeks and also became the year's Christmas number-one.

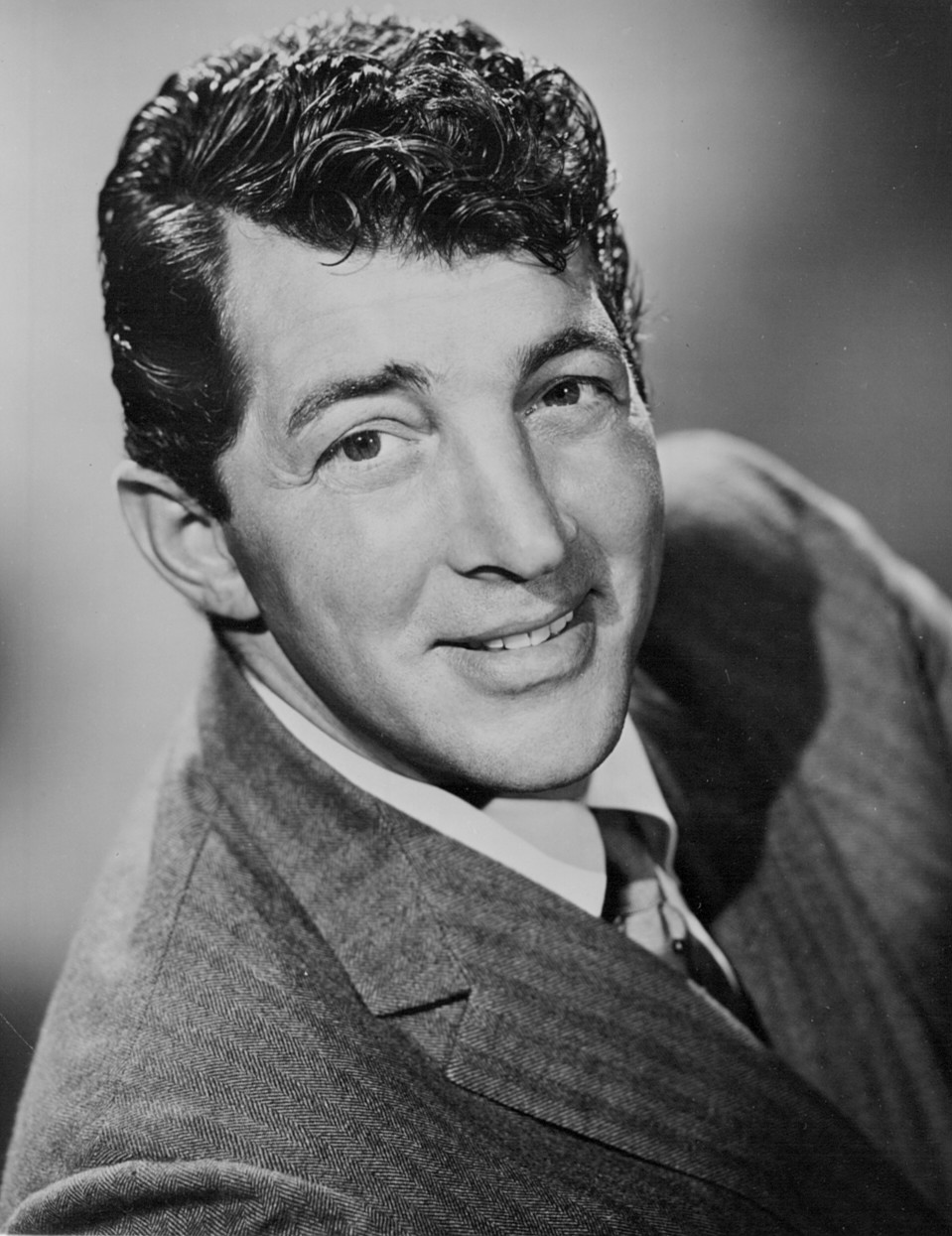
Dean Martin achieved his only UK number-one single in February of this year with "Memories Are Made of This", which spent four weeks at the top of the chart.

The UK Singles Chart is one of many music charts compiled by the Official Charts Company that calculates the best-selling singles of the week in the United Kingdom. Before 2004, the chart was only based on the sales of physical singles. This list shows singles that peaked in the Top 10 of the UK Singles Chart during 1956, as well as singles which peaked in 1955 and 1957 but were in the top 10 in 1956. The entry date is when the single appeared in the top 10 for the first time (week ending, as published by the Official Charts Company, which is six days after the chart is announced).

Eighty-four singles were in the top ten in 1956. Eight singles from 1955 remained in the top 10 for several weeks at the beginning of the year, while "Singing the Blues" by Guy Mitchell and "True Love" by Bing Crosby & Grace Kelly were both released in 1956 but did not reach their peak until 1957. "Meet Me on the Corner" by Max Bygraves, "Never Do a Tango with an Eskimo" by Alma Cogan, "Suddenly There's a Valley" by Petula Clark and "Twenty Tiny Fingers" by The Stargazers were the singles from 1955 to reach their peak in 1956. Eighteen artists scored multiple entries in the top 10 in 1956. Elvis Presley, Frankie Vaughan and Lonnie Donegan were among the many artists who achieved their first UK charting top 10 single in 1956.

"Rock Around the Clock" by Bill Haley & His Comets, which had spent three weeks at number-one in 1955, returned to number-one in the first week of 1956 for another two weeks. The first new number-one single of the year was "Sixteen Tons" by Tennessee Ernie Ford. Overall, eleven different singles peaked at number-one in 1956, with eleven unique artists having the most singles hit that position.

== Background ==
=== Multiple entries ===
Eighty-four singles charted in the top 10 in 1956, with seventy-nine singles reaching their peak this year. The EP All Star Hit Parade consisted of six songs by different artists who are all credited for the individual songs but only counts as one entry in the table. Fourteen songs were recorded by several artists with each version reaching the top 10:

- "A Tear Fell" – Lita Roza (on All Star Hit Parade), Teresa Brewer
- "Blue Suede Shoes" – Carl Perkins, Elvis Presley
- "It's Almost Tomorrow" – David Whitfield, The Dream Weavers
- "Memories Are Made of This" – Dave King with The Keynotes, Dean Martin
- "More" – Jimmy Young, Perry Como
- "My September Love" – David Whitfield, Joan Regan (on All Star Hit Parade)
- "No Other Love" – Dave King (on All Star Hit Parade), Ronnie Hilton
- "Only You (And You Alone)" – The Hilltoppers, The Platters
- "Sixteen Tons" – Frankie Laine with The Mellomen, Tennessee Ernie Ford
- "The Ballad of Davy Crockett" – Bill Hayes, Tennessee Ernie Ford
- "The Great Pretender" – Jimmy Parkinson, The Platters
- "The Green Door" – Frankie Vaughan, Jim Lowe & The High Fives
- "Theme from The Threepenny Opera" – Dick Hyman Trio, Louis Armstrong with His All-Stars, Winifred Atwell
- "The Wayward Wind" – Gogi Grant, Tex Ritter

Eighteen artists scored multiple entries in the top 10 in 1956. Bill Haley & His Comets secured the record for most top 10 hits in 1956 with six hit singles.

Ronnie Hilton was one of a number of artists with two top-ten entries, including the number-one single "No Other Love". David Whitfield, Frank Sinatra, Jimmy Young, Perry Como and Tennessee Ernie Ford were among the other artists who had multiple top 10 entries in 1956.

=== Chart debuts ===
Thirty-four artists achieved their first top 10 single in 1956, either as a lead or featured artist. Of these, three went on to record another hit single that year: Dave King, The Goons and The Platters. Lonnie Donegan achieved two more chart hits in 1956. Elvis Presley had three other entries in his breakthrough year.

The following table (collapsed on desktop site) does not include acts who had previously charted as part of a group and secured their first top 10 solo single.

Artist	Number of top 10s	First entry	Chart position	Other entries
Bill Hayes	1	"The Ballad of Davy Crockett"	2	—
Lonnie Donegan	3	"Rock Island Line"	8	"Lost John"/"Stewball" (2), "Bring a Little Water, Sylvie"/"Dead or Alive" (7)
Eve Boswell	1	"Pickin' a Chicken"	9	—
Gary Miller	1	"Robin Hood"	10	—
Lou Busch	1	"Zambezi"	2	—
The Hilltoppers	1	"Only You (And You Alone)"	3	—
The Dream Weavers	1	"It's Almost Tomorrow"	1	—
Don Cherry	1	"Band of Gold"	6	—
Edmund Hockridge	1	"Young and Foolish"	10	—
Dave King	2	"Memories Are Made of This"	5	"No Other Love" (2)
The Keynotes	1	"Memories Are Made of This"	5	—
Jimmy Parkinson	1	"The Great Pretender"	9	—
Dick Hyman Trio	1	"Theme from The Threepenny Opera"	9	—
Billy May	1	"Main Title Theme from The Man with the Golden Arm"	9	—
Don Robertson	1	"The Happy Whistler"	8	—
Elvis Presley	4	"Heartbreak Hotel"	2	"Blue Moon", "Blue Suede Shoes" (9), "Hound Dog" (2)
Carl Perkins	1	"Blue Suede Shoes"	10	—
Morris Stoloff	1	"Moonglow and Theme from Picnic"	7	—
Johnny Dankworth	1	"Experiments with Mice"	7	—
Various Artists	1	"All Star Hit Parade (EP)"	2	—
The Goons	2	"I'm Walking Backwards for Christmas"/"The Bluebottle Blues"	4	"Ying Tong Song"/"Bloodnok's Rock 'N' Roll Call" (3)
Frankie Lymon	1	"Why Do Fools Fall in Love"	1	—
The Teenagers	1	"Why Do Fools Fall in Love"	1	—
Gogi Grant	1	"The Wayward Wind"	9	—
Tex Ritter	1	"The Wayward Wind"	8	—
Mel Tormé	1	"Mountain Greenery"	4	—
Anne Shelton	1	"Lay Down Your Arms"	1	—
The Chordettes	1	"Born to Be with You"	8	—
The Platters	2	"The Great Pretender"/"Only You"	5	"My Prayer" (4)
Freddie Bell and the Bellboys	1	"Giddy Up a Ding Dong"	4	—
Jim Lowe	1	"The Green Door"	8	—
The High Fives	1	"The Green Door"	8	—
Mitchell Torok	1	"When Mexico Gave Up the Rhumba"	6	—
Grace Kelly	1	"True Love" ^{[A]}	4	—

Notes

The EP All Star Hit Parade, which peaked at number two in July, featured the following songs: "Out of Town" by Dickie Valentine; "My September Love" by Joan Regan; "Theme from The Threepenny Opera" by Winifred Atwell; "No Other Love" by Dave King; "A Tear Fell" by Lita Roza and "It's Almost Tomorrow" by David Whitfield. Dave King was the only artist from this set who had not recorded a top 10 single until this year but he appeared in the chart earlier in the year with "Memories Are Made of This", a number five entry in March.

=== Songs from films ===
Original songs from various films entered the top 10 throughout the year. These included "Rock-A-Beatin' Boogie", "Only You (And You Alone)" & "The Great Pretender" (The Platters versions), "See You Later, Alligator" and "Giddy Up a Ding Dong" (all from Rock Around the Clock), "(Love Is) The Tender Trap" (The Tender Trap), "The Main Title Theme from The Man with the Golden Arm"(The Man with the Golden Arm), "Moonglow and Theme from Picnic" (Picnic), "Que Sera, Sera (Whatever Will Be, Will Be)" (The Man Who Knew Too Much), "A Woman in Love" (Guys and Dolls), "Rip It Up" (Don't Knock the Rock) and "True Love" (High Society) .

Additionally, several versions of The Ballad of Davy Crockett entered the chart as part of the "Crockett craze", inspired by the 1955 Disney film Davy Crockett, King of the Wild Frontier. Elvis Presley re-recorded his song "Blue Suede Shoes" for the 1960 film he starred in, G.I. Blues. "Hound Dog" was first recorded by Bill Haley & His Comets and featured in Rock Around the Clock, but Elvis Presley took the song into the top ten. Mel Torme's "Mountain Greenery" was a cover of a song that appeared in the 1948 film Words and Music. "My Prayer" by The Platters was originally recorded by Vera Lynn for the 1944 film "One Exciting Night".

=== Best-selling singles ===
Until 1970 there was no universally recognised year-end best-sellers list. However, in 2011 the Official Charts Company released a list of the best-selling single of each year in chart history from 1952 to date. According to the list, "I'll Be Home" by Pat Boone is officially recorded as the biggest-selling single of 1956.

== Top-ten singles ==
Key

Symbol	Meaning
‡	Single peaked in 1955 but still in chart in 1956.
♦	Single released in 1956 but peaked in 1957.
(#)	Year-end best-selling single.
Entered	The date that the single first appeared in the chart.
Peak	Highest position that the single reached in the UK Singles Chart.

Entered (week ending)	Weeks in top 10	Single	Artist	Peak	Peak reached (week ending)	Weeks at peak
Singles in 1955
21 October 1955	20	"Rock Around the Clock" ‡ ^{[B]}	Bill Haley & His Comets	1	25 November 1955	5
11 November 1955	9	"Let's Have a Ding Dong" ‡	Winifred Atwell	3	2 December 1955	1
25 November 1955	11	"Love Is a Many-Splendored Thing" ‡	The Four Aces	2	25 November 1955	2
25 November 1955	8	"Twenty Tiny Fingers"	The Stargazers	4	6 January 1956	1
2 December 1955	6	"Christmas Alphabet" ‡	Dickie Valentine	1	16 December 1955	3
2 December 1955	8	"Meet Me on the Corner"	Max Bygraves	2	6 January 1956	1
9 December 1955	5	"Suddenly There's a Valley"	Petula Clark	7	6 January 1956	1
23 December 1955	3	"Hawkeye" ‡	Frankie Laine	7	23 December 1955	2
30 December 1955	3	"Never Do a Tango with an Eskimo"	Alma Cogan	6	6 January 1956	2
Singles in 1956
6 January 1956	6	"Rock-A-Beatin' Boogie"	Bill Haley & His Comets	4	13 January 1956	2
13 January 1956	8	"Sixteen Tons"	Tennessee Ernie Ford	1	20 January 1956	4
13 January 1956	7	"The Ballad of Davy Crockett"	Bill Hayes	2	20 January 1956	3
13 January 1956	6	"Love and Marriage"	Frank Sinatra	3	20 January 1956	1
20 January 1956	4	"The Ballad of Davy Crockett"	Tennessee Ernie Ford	3	27 January 1956	1
20 January 1956	8	"(Love Is) The Tender Trap"	Frank Sinatra	2	10 February 1956	1
20 January 1956	6	"Rock Island Line" ^{[C]}	Lonnie Donegan	8	3 February 1956	1
27 January 1956	1	"Sixteen Tons"	Frankie Laine with The Mellomen	10	27 January 1956	1
3 February 1956	1	"Pickin' a Chicken"	Eve Boswell	9	3 February 1956	1
3 February 1956	1	"Robin Hood"	Gary Miller	10	3 February 1956	1
10 February 1956	12	"Memories Are Made of This"	Dean Martin	1	17 February 1956	4
10 February 1956	12	"Zambezi"	Lou Busch	2	24 February 1956	4
10 February 1956	14	"Only You (And You Alone)"	The Hilltoppers	3	11 May 1956	1
17 February 1956	14	"It's Almost Tomorrow"	The Dream Weavers	1	16 March 1956	3
17 February 1956	17	"(The) Rock and Roll Waltz"	Kay Starr	1	30 March 1956	1
17 February 1956	6	"Band of Gold"	Don Cherry	6	2 March 1956	1
24 February 1956	1	"Dreams Can Tell a Lie"	Nat King Cole	10	24 February 1956	1
2 March 1956	2	"Young and Foolish"	Edmund Hockridge	10	2 March 1956	2
9 March 1956	8	"Memories Are Made of This"	Dave King with The Keynotes	5	9 March 1956	3
9 March 1956	8	"See You Later Alligator" ^{[D]}	Bill Haley & His Comets	7	16 March 1956	3
16 March 1956	3	"The Great Pretender" ^{[E]}	Jimmy Parkinson	9	6 April 1956	1
23 March 1956	11	"The Poor People of Paris"	Winifred Atwell	1	13 April 1956	3
23 March 1956	3	"Chain Gang"	Jimmy Young	9	23 March 1956	2
30 March 1956	3	"Theme from The Threepenny Opera" ^{[F]}	Dick Hyman Trio	9	13 April 1956	3
20 April 1956	13	"My September Love"	David Whitfield	3	18 May 1956	1
27 April 1956	11	"No Other Love"	Ronnie Hilton	1	4 May 1956	6
27 April 1956	10	"A Tear Fell"	Teresa Brewer	2	25 May 1956	1
4 May 1956	1	"A Theme from The Threepenny Opera (Mack the Knife)"	Louis Armstrong with His All-Stars	8	4 May 1956	1
4 May 1956	4	"Main Title Theme from The Man with the Golden Arm"	Billy May	9	4 May 1956	2
11 May 1956	11	"Lost John"/"Stewball"	Lonnie Donegan	2	1 June 1956	3
11 May 1956	17	"I'll Be Home" (#1)	Pat Boone	1	15 June 1956	5
18 May 1956	3	"The Happy Whistler"	Don Robertson	8	18 May 1956	1
25 May 1956	16	"Heartbreak Hotel"	Elvis Presley	2	22 June 1956	2
1 June 1956	9	"The Saints Rock 'N' Roll" ^{[G]}	Bill Haley & His Comets	5	6 July 1956	1
8 June 1956	9	"Hot Diggity (Dog Ziggity Boom)"	Perry Como	4	22 June 1956	1
8 June 1956	4	"Blue Suede Shoes"	Elvis Presley	9	15 June 1956	1
15 June 1956	1	"Blue Suede Shoes"	Carl Perkins	10	15 June 1956	1
22 June 1956	1	"Moonglow and Theme from Picnic"	Morris Stoloff	7	22 June 1956	1
29 June 1956	1	"Too Young to Go Steady"	Nat King Cole	8	29 June 1956	1
29 June 1956	4	"Experiments with Mice"	Johnny Dankworth	7	13 July 1956	2
6 July 1956	5	"All Star Hit Parade (EP)" ^{[H]}	Various artists	2	13 July 1956	1
6 July 1956	5	"I'm Walking Backwards for Christmas"/"The Bluebottle Blues"	The Goons	4	13 July 1956	1
13 July 1956	11	"Why Do Fools Fall in Love"	Frankie Lymon & The Teenagers	1	20 July 1956	3
13 July 1956	2	"The Wayward Wind"	Gogi Grant	9	13 July 1956	2
20 July 1956	12	"Walk Hand in Hand"	Tony Martin	2	10 August 1956	1
20 July 1956	4	"Who Are We"	Ronnie Hilton	6	3 August 1956	1
27 July 1956	15	"Que Sera, Sera (Whatever Will Be, Will Be)"	Doris Day	1	10 August 1956	6
27 July 1956	5	"The Wayward Wind"	Tex Ritter	8	3 August 1956	2
3 August 1956	9	"A Sweet Old Fashioned Girl"	Teresa Brewer	3	17 August 1956	3
3 August 1956	8	"Mountain Greenery"	Mel Tormé	4	10 August 1956	1
17 August 1956	14	"Rockin' Through the Rye"	Bill Haley & His Comets	3	21 September 1956	1
24 August 1956	2	"Serenade"	Slim Whitman	8	31 August 1956	1
7 September 1956	11	"Lay Down Your Arms"	Anne Shelton	1	21 September 1956	4
7 September 1956	1	"Born to Be with You"	The Chordettes	8	7 September 1956	1
14 September 1956	7	"The Great Pretender"/"Only You (And You Alone)"	The Platters	5	21 September 1956	2
14 September 1956	6	"Ying Tong Song"/"Bloodnok's Rock 'N' Roll Call"	The Goons	3	28 September 1956	1
14 September 1956	7	"Bring a Little Water, Sylvie"/"Dead or Alive"	Lonnie Donegan	7	28 September 1956	2
28 September 1956	17	"Hound Dog" ^{[I]}	Elvis Presley	2	26 October 1956	3
28 September 1956	14	"A Woman in Love"	Frankie Laine	1	19 October 1956	4
5 October 1956	6	"Giddy Up a Ding Dong"	Freddie Bell and the Bellboys	4	19 October 1956	2
26 October 1956	14	"Just Walkin' in the Rain"	Johnnie Ray	1	16 November 1956	7
2 November 1956	9	"My Prayer"	The Platters	4	9 November 1956	3
2 November 1956	6	"More"	Jimmy Young	4	16 November 1956	2
9 November 1956	1	"More"	Perry Como	10	9 November 1956	1
16 November 1956	9	"Rip It Up"	Bill Haley & His Comets	4	7 December 1956	2
16 November 1956	1	"The Green Door"	Jim Lowe & The High Fives	8	16 November 1956	1
16 November 1956	12	"The Green Door"	Frankie Vaughan	2	7 December 1956	3
23 November 1956	2	"When Mexico Gave Up the Rhumba"	Mitchell Torok	6	23 November 1956	1
23 November 1956	3	"Blue Moon"	Elvis Presley	9	23 November 1956	3
23 November 1956	13	"St. Therese of the Roses"	Malcolm Vaughan	3	14 December 1956	4
7 December 1956	19	"True Love"♦	Bing Crosby & Grace Kelly	4	8 February 1957	1
14 December 1956	17	"Singing the Blues" ♦	Guy Mitchell	1	4 January 1957	3
14 December 1956	9	"Cindy, Oh Cindy"	Eddie Fisher	5	21 December 1956	2
21 December 1956	2	"Make It a Party"	Winifred Atwell	7	28 December 1956	1
28 December 1956	1	"Christmas Island"	Dickie Valentine	8	28 December 1956	1

== Entries by artist ==
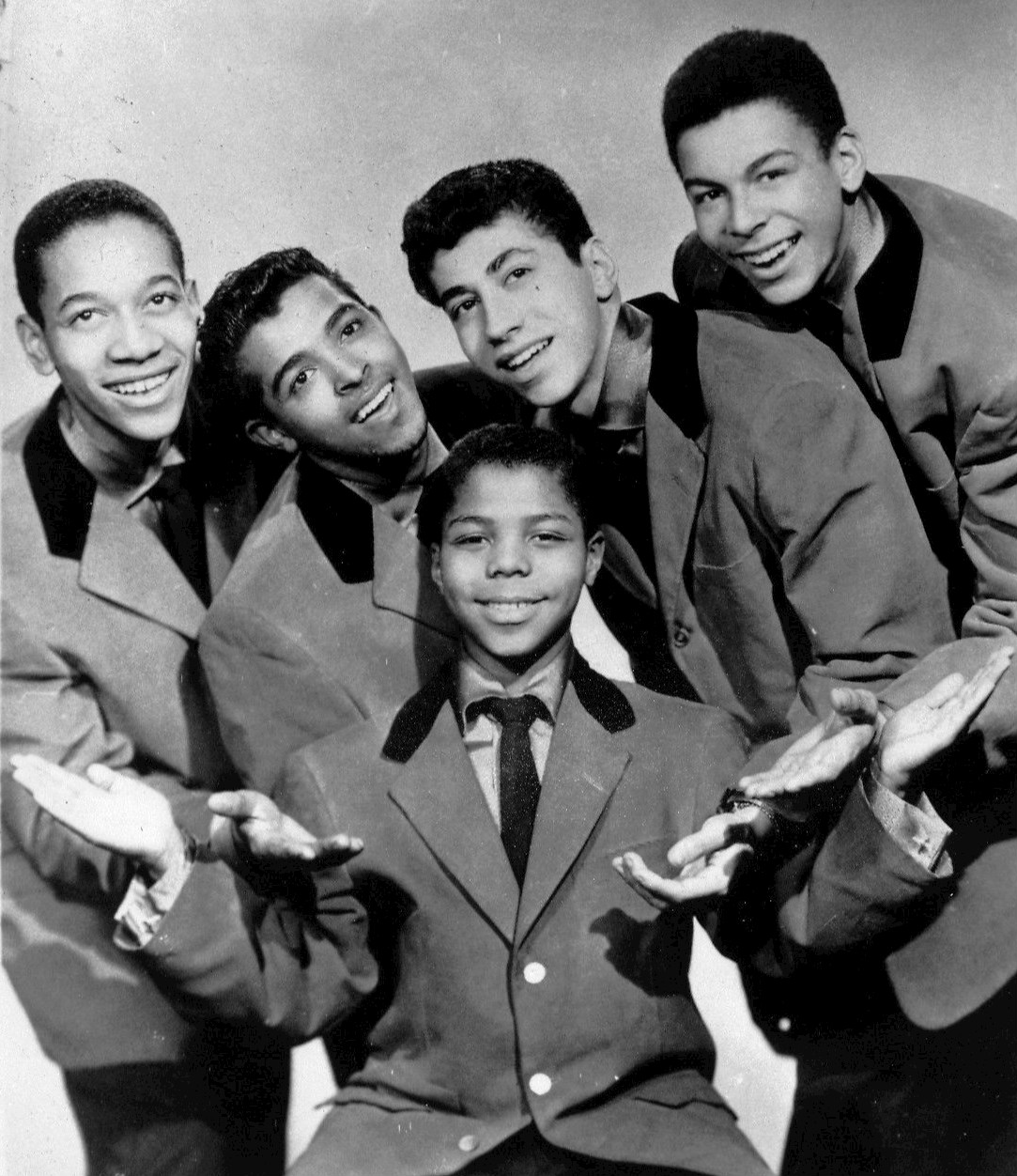
Frankie Lymon and his group The Teenagers spent three weeks at number-one in 1956 with their biggest hit and signature song "Why Do Fools Fall in Love". Lymon, who was aged 13 years and 10 months old when the song topped the charts, became, at the time, the youngest person to have a UK number-one single.

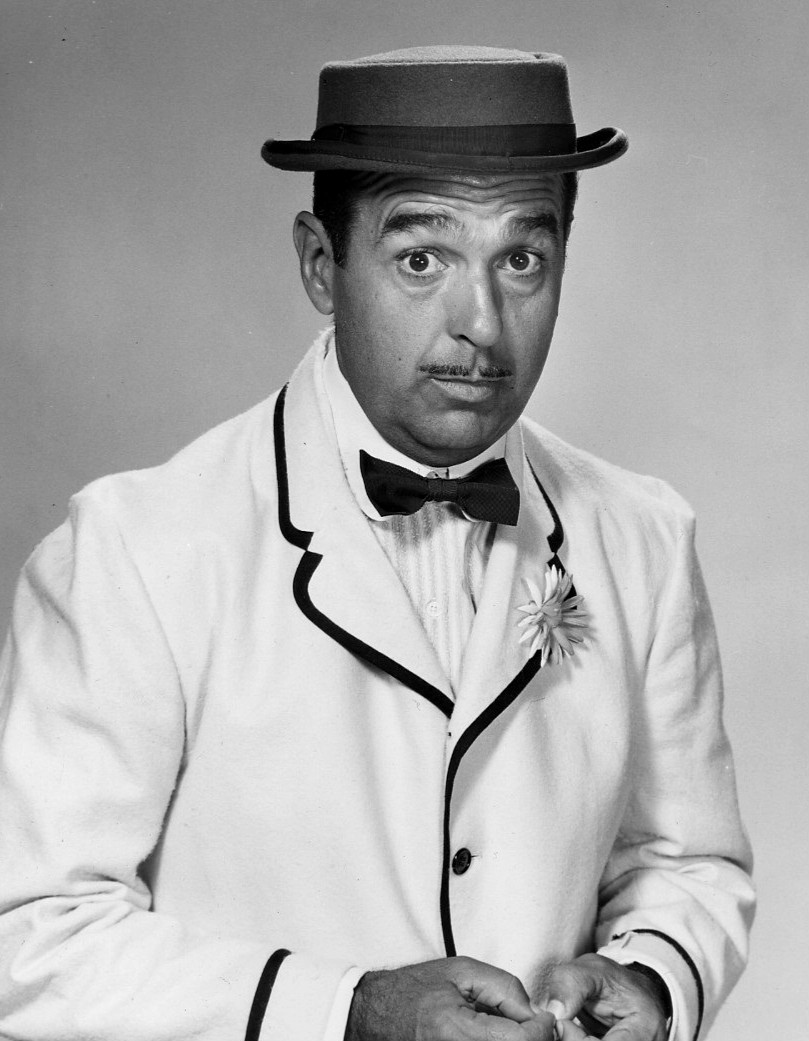
Tennessee Ernie Ford scored two UK top 10 entries this year, including "Sixteen Tons", which spent four weeks at the top of the chart and became his second and final number-one hit.

The following table shows artists who achieved two or more top 10 entries in 1956, including singles that reached their peak in 1955 or 1957. The figures include both main artists and featured artists. The total number of weeks an artist spent in the top ten in 1956 is also shown.

Entries	Artist	Weeks	Singles
6	Bill Haley & His Comets ^{[J]}	56	"Rip It Up", "Rock-A-Beatin' Boogie", "Rock Around the Clock", "Rockin' Through the Rye", "See You Later Alligator", "The Saints Rock 'N' Roll"
4	Elvis Presley	35	"Blue Moon", "Blue Suede Shoes", "Heartbreak Hotel", "Hound Dog"
4	Winifred Atwell ^{[J]}^{[K]}^{[L]}	19	"Let's Have a Ding Dong", "Make It a Party", "The Poor People of Paris", "Theme from The Threepenny Opera" (on All Star Hit Parade)
3	Dickie Valentine ^{[J]}^{[L]}	8	"Christmas Alphabet", "Out of Town" (on All Star Hit Parade), "Christmas Island"
3	Frankie Laine ^{[J]}	16	"A Woman in Love", "Hawkeye", "Sixteen Tons"
3	Lonnie Donegan	24	"Bring a Little Water, Sylvie"/"Dead or Alive", "Lost John"/"Stewball", "Rock Island Line"
2	Dave King ^{[L]}	13	"Memories Are Made of This", "No Other Love" (on All Star Hit Parade)
2	David Whitfield ^{[L]}	18	"It's Almost Tomorrow" (on All Star Hit Parade), "My September Love"
2	Frank Sinatra	14	"Love and Marriage", "(Love Is) The Tender Trap"
2	The Goons	11	"I'm Walking Backwards for Christmas"/"The Bluebottle Blues", "Ying Tong Song"/"Bloodnok's Rock 'N' Roll Call"
2	Jimmy Young	9	"Chain Gang", "More"
2	Nat King Cole	2	"Dreams Can Tell a Lie", "Too Young to Go Steady"
2	Perry Como	10	"Hot Diggity (Dog Ziggity Boom)", "More"
2	The Platters	15	"My Prayer", "The Great Pretender"/"Only You (And You Alone)"
2	Ronnie Hilton	15	"No Other Love", "Who Are We"
2	Tennessee Ernie Ford	12	"Sixteen Tons", "The Ballad of Davy Crockett"
2	Teresa Brewer	19	"A Tear Fell", "A Sweet Old Fashioned Girl"

== Notes ==
- ^{a} "True Love" reached its peak of number four on 14 February 1957 (week ending).
- ^{b} "(We're Gonna) Rock Around the Clock" re-entered the top 10 at number 8 on 18 October 1956 (week ending) for 5 weeks.
- ^{c} "Rock Island Line" re-entered the top 10 at number 9 on 8 March 1956 (week ending) and at number 9 on 22 March 1956 (week ending).
- ^{d} "See You Later Alligator" re-entered the top 10 at number 10 on 10 May 1956 (week ending).
- ^{e} "The Great Pretender" (Jimmy Parkinson version) re-entered the top 10 at number 9 on 12 April 1956 (week ending) for 2 weeks.
- ^{f} "Theme from The Threepenny Opera" (Dick Hyman Trio version) re-entered the top 10 at number 9 on 19 April 1956 (week ending) for 2 weeks.
- ^{g} "The Saints Rock 'N' Roll" re-entered the top 10 at number 10 on 23 August 1956 week ending) and at number 10 on 6 September 1956 (week ending) for 2 weeks.
- ^{h} "All Star Hit Parade (EP)" re-entered the top 10 at number 8 on 16 August 1956 (week ending).
- ^{i} "Hound Dog" re-entered the top 10 at number 8 on 10 January 1957 (week ending) for 4 weeks and at number 10 on 14 February 1957 (week ending).
- ^{j} Figure includes single that peaked in 1955.
- ^{k} Figure includes single that peaked in 1957.
- ^{l} Figures includes single that appeared on the "All Star Hit Parade" EP.

== See also ==
- 1956 in British music
- List of number-one singles from the 1950s (UK)
