= Billboard year-end top 50 singles of 1956 =

Ranking of recorded music

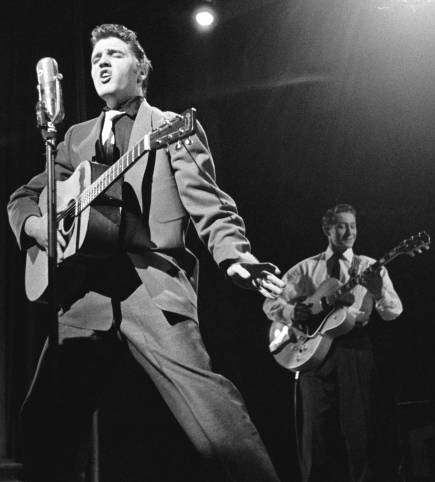
Elvis Presley had five songs on the year-end top 50, the most of any artist in 1956, including "Heartbreak Hotel" and "Don't Be Cruel", the top two songs of the year.

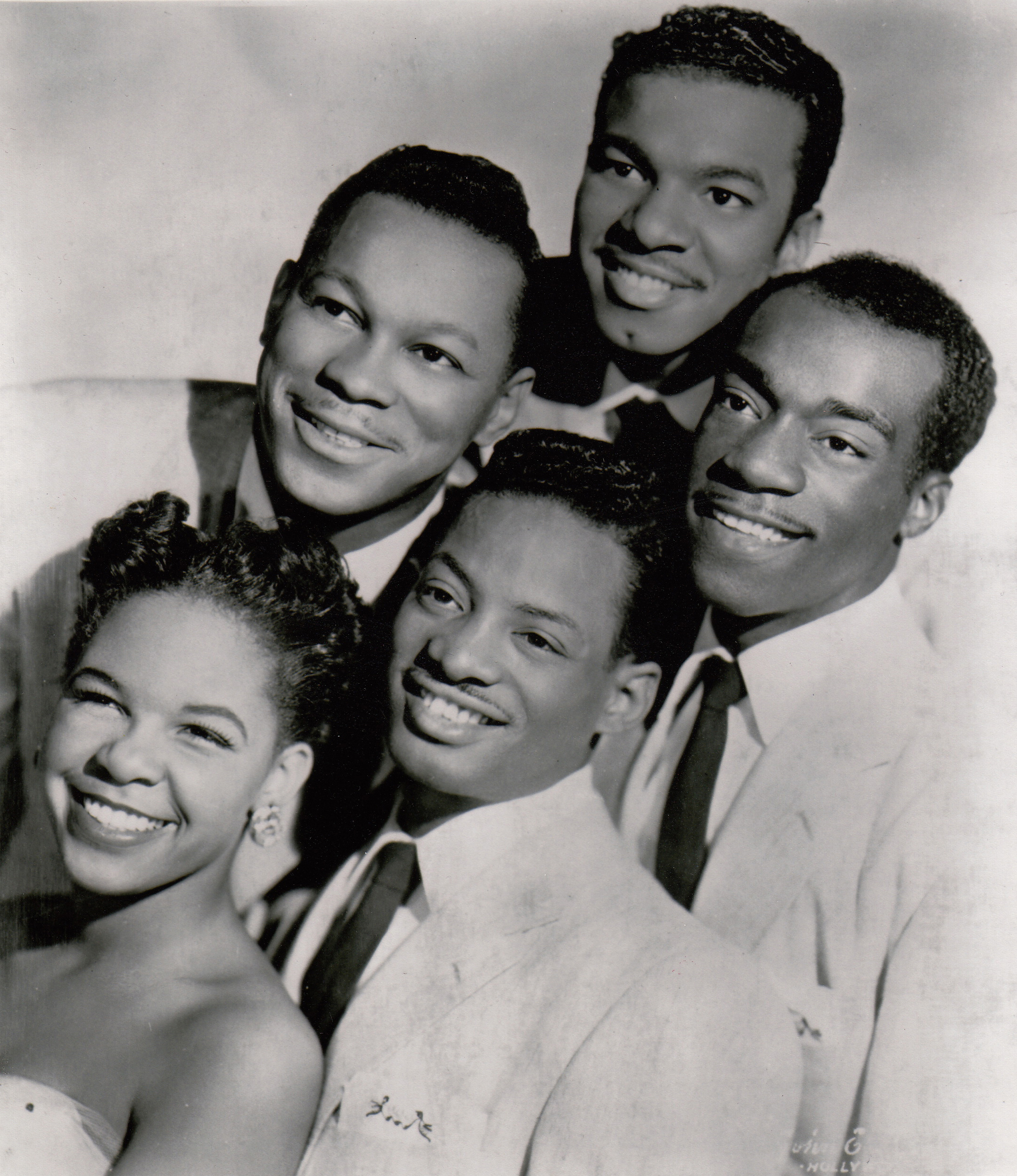
The Platters had three songs on the year-end top 50.

This is a list of Billboard magazine's top 50 singles of 1956 according to retail sales.

No.	Title	Artist(s)
1	"Heartbreak Hotel"	Elvis Presley
2	"Don't Be Cruel"	Elvis Presley
3	"Lisbon Antigua"	Nelson Riddle
4	"My Prayer"	The Platters
5	"The Wayward Wind"	Gogi Grant
6	"Hound Dog"	Elvis Presley
7	"The Poor People of Paris"	Les Baxter
8	"Que Sera, Sera (Whatever Will Be, Will Be)"	Doris Day
9	"Memories Are Made of This"	Dean Martin
10	"(The) Rock and Roll Waltz"	Kay Starr
11	"Moonglow and Theme from Picnic"	Morris Stoloff
12	"The Great Pretender"	The Platters
13	"I Almost Lost My Mind"	Pat Boone
14	"I Want You, I Need You, I Love You"	Elvis Presley
15	"Love Me Tender"	Elvis Presley
16	"Hot Diggity (Dog Ziggity Boom)"	Perry Como
17	"Canadian Sunset"	Eddie Heywood & Hugo Winterhalter
18	"Blue Suede Shoes"	Carl Perkins
19	"Green Door"	Jim Lowe
20	"No, Not Much"	The Four Lads
21	"Honky Tonk"	Bill Doggett
22	"Sixteen Tons"	Tennessee Ernie Ford
23	"Just Walkin' in the Rain"	Johnnie Ray
24	"Allegheny Moon"	Patti Page
25	"I'm in Love Again"	Fats Domino
26	"Tonight You Belong to Me"	Patience and Prudence
27	"Be-Bop-A-Lula"	Gene Vincent
28	"Why Do Fools Fall in Love"	Frankie Lymon and the Teenagers
29	"Standing on the Corner"	The Four Lads
30	"The Flying Saucer"	Buchanan & Goodman
31	"Moonglow and Theme from Picnic"	George Cates
32	"Ivory Tower"	Cathy Carr
33	"See You Later Alligator"	Bill Haley & His Comets
34	"I'll Be Home"	Pat Boone
35	"On the Street Where You Live"	Vic Damone
36	"(You've Got) The Magic Touch"	The Platters
37	"Born to Be with You"	The Chordettes
38	"Band of Gold"	Don Cherry
39	"More"	Perry Como
40	"Singing the Blues"	Guy Mitchell
41	"Blueberry Hill"	Fats Domino
42	"The Fool"	Sanford Clark
43	"The Happy Whistler"	Don Robertson
44	"True Love"	Bing Crosby & Grace Kelly
45	"Long Tall Sally"	Little Richard
46	"A Sweet Old Fashioned Girl"	Teresa Brewer
47	"Transfusion"	Nervous Norvus
48	"It Only Hurts for a Little While"	The Ames Brothers
49	"A Tear Fell"	Teresa Brewer
50	"Rock Island Line"	Lonnie Donegan

== See also ==
- 1956 in music
- List of Billboard number-one singles of 1956
