= List of Cash Box Best Sellers number-one singles of 1956 =

These are the songs that reached number one on the Top 50 Best Sellers chart in 1956 as published by Cash Box magazine.

Issue date	Song	Artist
January 7	"Sixteen Tons"	Tennessee Ernie Ford
January 14	"Memories Are Made of This"	Dean Martin
January 21	"Memories Are Made of This"	Dean Martin
January 28	"Memories Are Made of This"	Dean Martin
February 4	"The Great Pretender"	The Platters
February 11	"The Great Pretender"	The Platters
February 18	"The Great Pretender"	The Platters
February 25	"Rock and Roll Waltz"	Kay Starr
March 3	"Rock and Roll Waltz"	Kay Starr
March 10	"Lisbon Antigua"	Nelson Riddle & Orchestra
March 17	"Lisbon Antigua"	Nelson Riddle & Orchestra
March 24	"The Poor People of Paris"	Les Baxter & Orchestra
March 31	"The Poor People of Paris"	Les Baxter & Orchestra
April 7	"The Poor People of Paris"	Les Baxter & Orchestra
April 14	"The Poor People of Paris"	Les Baxter & Orchestra
April 21	"Heartbreak Hotel"	Elvis Presley
April 28	"Heartbreak Hotel"	Elvis Presley
May 5	"Heartbreak Hotel"	Elvis Presley
May 12	"Heartbreak Hotel"	Elvis Presley
May 19	"Heartbreak Hotel"	Elvis Presley
May 26	"Heartbreak Hotel"	Elvis Presley
June 2	"Moonglow and Theme from 'Picnic'"	Morris Stoloff & Columbia Pictures Orchestra, George Cates & Orchestra
June 9	"Moonglow and Theme from 'Picnic'"	Morris Stoloff & Columbia Pictures Orchestra, George Cates & Orchestra
June 16	"The Wayward Wind"	Gogi Grant
June 23	"The Wayward Wind"	Gogi Grant
June 30	"The Wayward Wind"	Gogi Grant
July 7	"The Wayward Wind"	Gogi Grant
July 14	"I Almost Lost My Mind"	Pat Boone
July 21	"The Wayward Wind"	Gogi Grant
July 28	"I Almost Lost My Mind"	Pat Boone
August 4	"My Prayer"	The Platters
August 11	"My Prayer"	The Platters
August 18	"Hound Dog"	Elvis Presley
August 25	"Hound Dog"	Elvis Presley
September 1	"Hound Dog"	Elvis Presley
September 8	"Hound Dog"	Elvis Presley
September 15	"Don't Be Cruel"	Elvis Presley
September 22	"Don't Be Cruel"	Elvis Presley
September 29	"Don't Be Cruel"	Elvis Presley
October 6	"Don't Be Cruel"	Elvis Presley
October 13	"Don't Be Cruel"	Elvis Presley
October 20	"Don't Be Cruel"	Elvis Presley
October 27	"Love Me Tender"	Elvis Presley
November 3	"Love Me Tender"	Elvis Presley
November 10	"Love Me Tender"	Elvis Presley
November 17	"Love Me Tender"	Elvis Presley
November 24	"Love Me Tender"	Elvis Presley
December 1	"Singing the Blues"	Guy Mitchell
December 8	"Singing the Blues"	Guy Mitchell
December 15	"Singing the Blues"	Guy Mitchell
December 22	"Singing the Blues"	Guy Mitchell
December 29	"Singing the Blues"	Guy Mitchell

== See also ==
- 1956 in music
- List of number-one singles of 1956 (U.S.)
