= James Parkinson (disambiguation) =

James Parkinson (1755–1824) was an English apothecary, surgeon, geologist, paleontologist and political activist, for whom Parkinson's disease is named.

James Parkinson may also refer to:

- James Parkinson (controversialist) (1653–1722), English academic and schoolmaster, known as a polemical writer
- James Parkinson (museum proprietor) (1730–1813), English land agent and museum proprietor
- James Parkinson (Irish politician) (1869–1948), Irish Cumann na nGaedheal and Fine Gael senator
- James W. Parkinson (born 1949), American lawyer and activist
- James Parkinson (footballer) (1862–1927), English footballer, during 1888–1889 season
- James Parkinson (Wisconsin politician) (1829–1897), American farmer and politician
- Jimmy Parkinson, of Barleyjuice
- Jimmy Parkinson, Australian singer who presented The Jimmy Parkinson Show
- Jim Parkinson (1941–2025), American type designer
