= List of Billboard number-one singles of 1956 =

This is a list of number-one songs in the United States during the year 1956 according to Billboard magazine. Prior to the creation of the Billboard Hot 100, Billboard published multiple singles charts each week. In 1956, the following five charts were produced:

- Best Sellers in Stores – ranked the biggest selling singles in retail stores, as reported by merchants surveyed throughout the country.
- Most Played by Jockeys – ranked the most played songs on United States radio stations, as reported by radio disc jockeys and radio stations.
- Most Played in Jukeboxes – ranked the most played songs in jukeboxes across the United States.
- Honor Roll of Hits – a composite ten-position song chart which combined data from the three charts above along with three other component charts. It served as The Billboard's lead chart until the introduction of the Hot 100 in 1958 and would remain in print until 1963.
- Top 100 - an early version of the Hot 100, the first chart to feature a combined tabulation of sales, airplay and jukebox play.

Note: In the issues dated February 25, June 16, September 15, November 17, and December 22, Billboard reported a tie for the number-one single on the Top 100. In addition, Billboard considered the following B-sides as sharing the number-one spot with its A-side on one of its charts:

- "I Was the One" (Elvis Presley; Best Sellers in Stores; April 21–April 28); (Note: Following these two weeks, Billboard listed only "Heartbreak Hotel" for the remainder of the disc's occupation in the number-one slot.)
- "I Was the One" (Elvis Presley; Most Played in Jukeboxes; May 5, May 12); (Note: With the exception of these two weeks, Billboard listed only "Heartbreak Hotel" as the number-one single on the "Most Played in Jukeboxes" chart during that disc’s occupation.)
- "My Baby Left Me" (Elvis Presley; Best Sellers in Stores; July 28);
- "Heaven on Earth" (The Platters; Best Sellers in Stores; August 4–11);
- "Don't Be Cruel"/"Hound Dog" (Elvis Presley; Best Sellers in Stores; August 18–October 27); (Note: From August 18 to September 15, "Hound Dog" was considered by Billboard to be the A-side of the disc. Following the week after September 22, Billboard listed "Don't Be Cruel" as the A-side for the remainder of the disc's occupation in the number-one slot. (For September 22, only "Don’t Be Cruel" was listed as the number-one single.))
- "Don't Be Cruel"/"Hound Dog" (Elvis Presley; Most Played in Jukeboxes; September 1–November 10); (Note: From September 1 to September 15, Billboard listed "Hound Dog" as the A-side of the disc. Afterwards, besides a brief return to the original listing on September 29, "Don't Be Cruel" was listed as the A-side for the remainder of the disc's occupation in the number-one slot.)
- "Any Way You Want Me" (Elvis Presley; Best Sellers in Stores; November 10–17); (Note: With the exception of these two weeks, Billboard listed only "Love Me Tender" as the number-one single on the "Best Sellers in Stores" chart during that disc’s occupation.) and
- "Any Way You Want Me" (Elvis Presley; Most Played in Jukeboxes; December 8).

Issue date	Best Sellers in Stores	Most Played by Jockeys	Most Played in Jukeboxes	Honor Roll of Hits	Top 100	Ref.
January 7	"Sixteen Tons"; Tennessee Ernie Ford with Orchestra Conducted by Jack Fascinato	"Memories Are Made of This"; Dean Martin with Orchestra conducted by Dick Stabile	"Sixteen Tons"; Tennessee Ernie Ford with Orchestra Conducted by Jack Fascinato	"Sixteen Tons"	"Sixteen Tons"; Tennessee Ernie Ford with Orchestra Conducted by Jack Fascinato	
January 14	"Memories Are Made of This"; Dean Martin with Orchestra conducted by Dick Stabile	"Memories Are Made of This"; Dean Martin with Orchestra conducted by Dick Stabile	"Sixteen Tons"; Tennessee Ernie Ford with Orchestra Conducted by Jack Fascinato	"Memories Are Made of This"	"Memories Are Made of This"; Dean Martin with Orchestra conducted by Dick Stabile	
January 21	"Memories Are Made of This"; Dean Martin with Orchestra conducted by Dick Stabile	"Memories Are Made of This"; Dean Martin with Orchestra conducted by Dick Stabile	"Sixteen Tons"; Tennessee Ernie Ford with Orchestra Conducted by Jack Fascinato	"Memories Are Made of This"	"Memories Are Made of This"; Dean Martin with Orchestra conducted by Dick Stabile	
January 28	"Memories Are Made of This"; Dean Martin with Orchestra conducted by Dick Stabile	"Memories Are Made of This"; Dean Martin with Orchestra conducted by Dick Stabile	"Memories Are Made of This"; Dean Martin with Orchestra conducted by Dick Stabile	"Memories Are Made of This"	"Memories Are Made of This"; Dean Martin with Orchestra conducted by Dick Stabile	
February 4	"Memories Are Made of This"; Dean Martin with Orchestra conducted by Dick Stabile	"Memories Are Made of This"; Dean Martin with Orchestra conducted by Dick Stabile	"Memories Are Made of This"; Dean Martin with Orchestra conducted by Dick Stabile	"Memories Are Made of This"	"Memories Are Made of This"; Dean Martin with Orchestra conducted by Dick Stabile	
February 11	"Memories Are Made of This"; Dean Martin with Orchestra conducted by Dick Stabile	"Memories Are Made of This"; Dean Martin with Orchestra conducted by Dick Stabile	"Memories Are Made of This"; Dean Martin with Orchestra conducted by Dick Stabile	"Memories Are Made of This"	"Memories Are Made of This"; Dean Martin with Orchestra conducted by Dick Stabile	
February 18	"Rock and Roll Waltz"; Kay Starr with Hugo Winterhalter's Orchestra and Chorus	"The Great Pretender"; The Platters	"Memories Are Made of This"; Dean Martin with Orchestra conducted by Dick Stabile	"Memories Are Made of This"	"The Great Pretender"; The Platters	
February 25	"Lisbon Antigua"; Nelson Riddle and His Orchestra	"The Great Pretender"; The Platters	"The Great Pretender"; The Platters	"Rock and Roll Waltz"	"The Great Pretender"; The Platters "Rock and Roll Waltz"; Kay Starr with Hugo Winterhalter's Orchestra and Chorus	
March 3	"Lisbon Antigua"; Nelson Riddle and His Orchestra	"Lisbon Antigua"; Nelson Riddle and His Orchestra	"Rock and Roll Waltz"; Kay Starr with Hugo Winterhalter's Orchestra and Chorus	"Rock and Roll Waltz"	"Rock and Roll Waltz"; Kay Starr with Hugo Winterhalter's Orchestra and Chorus	
March 10	"Lisbon Antigua"; Nelson Riddle and His Orchestra	"Rock and Roll Waltz"; Kay Starr with Hugo Winterhalter's Orchestra and Chorus	"Rock and Roll Waltz"; Kay Starr with Hugo Winterhalter's Orchestra and Chorus	"Rock and Roll Waltz"	"Rock and Roll Waltz"; Kay Starr with Hugo Winterhalter's Orchestra and Chorus	
March 17	"Lisbon Antigua"; Nelson Riddle and His Orchestra	"The Poor People of Paris"; Les Baxter	"Rock and Roll Waltz"; Kay Starr with Hugo Winterhalter's Orchestra and Chorus	"Poor People of Paris (Jean's Song)"	"Rock and Roll Waltz"; Kay Starr with Hugo Winterhalter's Orchestra and Chorus	
March 24	"The Poor People of Paris"; Les Baxter	"The Poor People of Paris"; Les Baxter	"Rock and Roll Waltz"; Kay Starr with Hugo Winterhalter's Orchestra and Chorus	"Rock and Roll Waltz"	"The Poor People of Paris"; Les Baxter	
March 31	"The Poor People of Paris"; Les Baxter	"The Poor People of Paris"; Les Baxter	"Rock and Roll Waltz"; Kay Starr with Hugo Winterhalter's Orchestra and Chorus	"Poor People of Paris (Jean's Song)"	"The Poor People of Paris"; Les Baxter	
April 7	"The Poor People of Paris"; Les Baxter	"The Poor People of Paris"; Les Baxter	"Rock and Roll Waltz"; Kay Starr with Hugo Winterhalter's Orchestra and Chorus	"Poor People of Paris (Jean's Song)"	"The Poor People of Paris"; Les Baxter	
April 14	"The Poor People of Paris"; Les Baxter	"Lisbon Antigua"; Nelson Riddle and His Orchestra	"The Poor People of Paris"; Les Baxter	"Poor People of Paris (Jean's Song)"	"The Poor People of Paris"; Les Baxter	
April 21	"Heartbreak Hotel"/"I Was the One"; Elvis Presley	"The Poor People of Paris"; Les Baxter	"The Poor People of Paris"; Les Baxter	"Poor People of Paris (Jean's Song)"	"The Poor People of Paris"; Les Baxter	
April 28	"Heartbreak Hotel"/"I Was the One"; Elvis Presley	"The Poor People of Paris"; Les Baxter	"The Poor People of Paris"; Les Baxter	"Poor People of Paris (Jean's Song)"	"The Poor People of Paris"; Les Baxter	
May 5	"Heartbreak Hotel"; Elvis Presley	"Hot Diggity (Dog Ziggity Boom)"; Perry Como with Mitchell Ayres & His Orchestra & the Ray Charles Singers	"Heartbreak Hotel"/"I Was the One"; Elvis Presley	"Heartbreak Hotel"	"Heartbreak Hotel"; Elvis Presley	
May 12	"Heartbreak Hotel"; Elvis Presley	"Heartbreak Hotel"; Elvis Presley	"Heartbreak Hotel"; Elvis Presley	"Heartbreak Hotel"	"Heartbreak Hotel"; Elvis Presley	
May 19	"Heartbreak Hotel"; Elvis Presley	"Heartbreak Hotel"; Elvis Presley	"Heartbreak Hotel"; Elvis Presley	"Hot Diggity"	"Heartbreak Hotel"; Elvis Presley	
May 26	"Heartbreak Hotel"; Elvis Presley	"Heartbreak Hotel"; Elvis Presley	"Heartbreak Hotel"/"I Was the One"; Elvis Presley	"Heartbreak Hotel"	"Heartbreak Hotel"; Elvis Presley	
June 2	"Heartbreak Hotel"; Elvis Presley	"Moonglow and Theme from Picnic"; Morris Stoloff	"Heartbreak Hotel"; Elvis Presley	"Moonglow and Theme from Picnic"	"Heartbreak Hotel"; Elvis Presley	
June 9	"Heartbreak Hotel"; Elvis Presley	"Moonglow and Theme from Picnic"; Morris Stoloff	"Heartbreak Hotel"; Elvis Presley	"Moonglow and Theme from Picnic"	"Heartbreak Hotel"; Elvis Presley	
June 16	"The Wayward Wind"; Gogi Grant with Orchestra Under Direction of Buddy Bregman	"Moonglow and Theme from Picnic"; Morris Stoloff	"Heartbreak Hotel"; Elvis Presley	"Moonglow and Theme from Picnic"	"Heartbreak Hotel"; Elvis Presley "The Wayward Wind"; Gogi Grant with Orchestra Under Direction of Buddy Bregman	
June 23	"The Wayward Wind"; Gogi Grant with Orchestra Under Direction of Buddy Bregman	"The Wayward Wind"; Gogi Grant with Orchestra Under Direction of Buddy Bregman	"Heartbreak Hotel"; Elvis Presley	"Moonglow and Theme from Picnic"	"The Wayward Wind"; Gogi Grant with Orchestra Under Direction of Buddy Bregman	
June 30	"The Wayward Wind"; Gogi Grant with Orchestra Under Direction of Buddy Bregman	"The Wayward Wind"; Gogi Grant with Orchestra Under Direction of Buddy Bregman	"The Wayward Wind"; Gogi Grant with Orchestra Under Direction of Buddy Bregman	"Moonglow and Theme from Picnic"	"The Wayward Wind"; Gogi Grant with Orchestra Under Direction of Buddy Bregman	
July 7	"The Wayward Wind"; Gogi Grant with Orchestra Under Direction of Buddy Bregman	"The Wayward Wind"; Gogi Grant with Orchestra Under Direction of Buddy Bregman	"The Wayward Wind"; Gogi Grant with Orchestra Under Direction of Buddy Bregman	"Wayward Wind"	"The Wayward Wind"; Gogi Grant with Orchestra Under Direction of Buddy Bregman	
July 14	"The Wayward Wind"; Gogi Grant with Orchestra Under Direction of Buddy Bregman	"The Wayward Wind"; Gogi Grant with Orchestra Under Direction of Buddy Bregman	"The Wayward Wind"; Gogi Grant with Orchestra Under Direction of Buddy Bregman	"Wayward Wind"	"The Wayward Wind"; Gogi Grant with Orchestra Under Direction of Buddy Bregman	
July 21	"The Wayward Wind"; Gogi Grant with Orchestra Under Direction of Buddy Bregman	"The Wayward Wind"; Gogi Grant with Orchestra Under Direction of Buddy Bregman	"The Wayward Wind"; Gogi Grant with Orchestra Under Direction of Buddy Bregman	"Wayward Wind"	"The Wayward Wind"; Gogi Grant with Orchestra Under Direction of Buddy Bregman	
July 28	"I Want You, I Need You, I Love You"/"My Baby Left Me"; Elvis Presley	"The Wayward Wind"; Gogi Grant with Orchestra Under Direction of Buddy Bregman	"I Almost Lost My Mind"; Pat Boone	"Wayward Wind"	"The Wayward Wind"; Gogi Grant with Orchestra Under Direction of Buddy Bregman	
August 4	"My Prayer"/"Heaven on Earth"; The Platters	"The Wayward Wind"; Gogi Grant with Orchestra Under Direction of Buddy Bregman	"I Almost Lost My Mind"; Pat Boone	"Wayward Wind"	"I Almost Lost My Mind"; Pat Boone	
August 11	"My Prayer"/"Heaven on Earth"; The Platters	"The Wayward Wind"; Gogi Grant with Orchestra Under Direction of Buddy Bregman	"I Almost Lost My Mind"; Pat Boone	"Wayward Wind"	"I Almost Lost My Mind"; Pat Boone	
August 18	"Hound Dog"/"Don't Be Cruel"; Elvis Presley	"My Prayer"; The Platters	"I Almost Lost My Mind"; Pat Boone	"My Prayer"	"My Prayer"; The Platters	
August 25	"Hound Dog"/"Don't Be Cruel"; Elvis Presley	"My Prayer"; The Platters	"My Prayer"; The Platters	"My Prayer"	"My Prayer"; The Platters	
September 1	"Hound Dog"/"Don't Be Cruel"; Elvis Presley	"My Prayer"; The Platters	"Hound Dog"/"Don't Be Cruel"; Elvis Presley	"My Prayer"	"My Prayer"; The Platters	
September 8	"Hound Dog"/"Don't Be Cruel"; Elvis Presley	"Don't Be Cruel"; Elvis Presley	"Hound Dog"/"Don't Be Cruel"; Elvis Presley	"My Prayer"	"My Prayer"; The Platters	
September 15	"Hound Dog"/"Don't Be Cruel"; Elvis Presley	"Don't Be Cruel"; Elvis Presley	"Hound Dog"/"Don't Be Cruel"; Elvis Presley	"My Prayer"	"My Prayer"; The Platters "Don't Be Cruel"; Elvis Presley	
September 22	"Don't Be Cruel"; Elvis Presley	"Don't Be Cruel"; Elvis Presley	"Don't Be Cruel"/"Hound Dog"; Elvis Presley	"My Prayer"	"Don't Be Cruel"; Elvis Presley	
September 29	"Don't Be Cruel"/"Hound Dog"; Elvis Presley	"Don't Be Cruel"; Elvis Presley	"Hound Dog"/"Don't Be Cruel"; Elvis Presley	"Don't Be Cruel"	"Don't Be Cruel"; Elvis Presley	
October 6	"Don't Be Cruel"/"Hound Dog"; Elvis Presley	"Don't Be Cruel"; Elvis Presley	"Don't Be Cruel"/"Hound Dog"; Elvis Presley	"Don't Be Cruel"	"Don't Be Cruel"; Elvis Presley	
October 13	"Don't Be Cruel"/"Hound Dog"; Elvis Presley	"Don't Be Cruel"; Elvis Presley	"Don't Be Cruel"/"Hound Dog"; Elvis Presley	"Don't Be Cruel"	"Don't Be Cruel"; Elvis Presley	
October 20	"Don't Be Cruel"/"Hound Dog"; Elvis Presley	"Don't Be Cruel"; Elvis Presley	"Don't Be Cruel"/"Hound Dog"; Elvis Presley	"Don't Be Cruel"	"Don't Be Cruel"; Elvis Presley	
October 27	"Don't Be Cruel"/"Hound Dog"; Elvis Presley	"Don't Be Cruel"; Elvis Presley	"Don't Be Cruel"/"Hound Dog"; Elvis Presley	"Don't Be Cruel"	"Don't Be Cruel"; Elvis Presley	
November 3	"Love Me Tender"; Elvis Presley	"Love Me Tender"; Elvis Presley	"Don't Be Cruel"/"Hound Dog"; Elvis Presley	"Love Me Tender"	"Green Door"; Jim Lowe with The High Fives	
November 10	"Love Me Tender"/"Any Way You Want Me"; Elvis Presley	"Love Me Tender"; Elvis Presley	"Don't Be Cruel"/"Hound Dog"; Elvis Presley	"Love Me Tender"	"Green Door"; Jim Lowe with The High Fives	
November 17	"Love Me Tender"/"Any Way You Want Me"; Elvis Presley	"Love Me Tender"; Elvis Presley	"Green Door"; Jim Lowe with The High Fives	"Love Me Tender"	"Green Door"; Jim Lowe with The High Fives "Love Me Tender"; Elvis Presley	
November 24	"Love Me Tender"; Elvis Presley	"Love Me Tender"; Elvis Presley	"Green Door"; Jim Lowe with The High Fives	"Love Me Tender"	"Love Me Tender"; Elvis Presley	
December 1	"Love Me Tender"; Elvis Presley	"Love Me Tender"; Elvis Presley	"Green Door"; Jim Lowe with The High Fives	"Love Me Tender"	"Love Me Tender"; Elvis Presley	
December 8	"Singing the Blues"; Guy Mitchell with Ray Conniff & his Orchestra	"Singing the Blues"; Guy Mitchell with Ray Conniff & his Orchestra	"Love Me Tender"/"Any Way You Want Me"; Elvis Presley	"Love Me Tender"	"Singing the Blues"; Guy Mitchell with Ray Conniff & his Orchestra	
December 15	"Singing the Blues"; Guy Mitchell with Ray Conniff & his Orchestra	"Singing the Blues"; Guy Mitchell with Ray Conniff & his Orchestra	"Singing the Blues"; Guy Mitchell with Ray Conniff & his Orchestra	"Singing the Blues"	"Singing the Blues"; Guy Mitchell with Ray Conniff & his Orchestra	
December 22	"Singing the Blues"; Guy Mitchell with Ray Conniff & his Orchestra	"Singing the Blues"; Guy Mitchell with Ray Conniff & his Orchestra	"Singing the Blues"; Guy Mitchell with Ray Conniff & his Orchestra	"Singing the Blues"	"Singing the Blues"; Guy Mitchell with Ray Conniff & his Orchestra "Love Me Tender"; Elvis Presley	
December 29	"Singing the Blues"; Guy Mitchell with Ray Conniff & his Orchestra	"Singing the Blues"; Guy Mitchell with Ray Conniff & his Orchestra	"Singing the Blues"; Guy Mitchell with Ray Conniff & his Orchestra	"Singing the Blues"	"Singing the Blues"; Guy Mitchell with Ray Conniff & his Orchestra	

== See also ==
- 1956 in music
