= Theme from Picnic =

Single by George Duning

from the album Picnic
- B-side: "Moonglow"
- Published: 1955
- Released: 1956
- Genre: Traditional pop
- Length: 2:35
- Label: Decca
- Composer: George Duning
- Lyricist: Steve Allen

"Theme from Picnic" is a popular song, originated in the 1955 movie Picnic, starring Kim Novak and William Holden, which was based on the play of the same name. The song is often referred to simply as "Picnic."

The song was published in 1956 and the music was written by George Duning. Recordings of the song that feature lyrics also give credit to lyricist Steve Allen.

== 1956 recordings ==
The most popular versions of the song in 1956 were:

- An instrumental medleys of the song with "Moonglow". A medley by Morris Stoloff and the Columbia Pictures Orchestra reached #1 on the Billboard charts in 1956
- Another version of the same medley by George Cates and his Orchestra was also a major hit of that year, reaching the top 5.
- A vocal recording of the song alone by The McGuire Sisters was also a hit, peaking at number thirteen on the Top 100 and number fifteen on the Best Seller charts.

== Other recordings ==
- Andy Williams released a version of the song on his 1956 album, Andy Williams Sings Steve Allen.
- Harry James recorded a version on his 1979 album Still Harry After All These Years (Sheffield Lab LAB-11).
