= Picnic (1955 film) =

1955 film by Joshua Logan

- Theatrical release poster
- Directed by: Joshua Logan
- Screenplay by: Daniel Taradash
- Based on: Picnic (1953 play) by William Inge
- Produced by: Fred Kohlmar
- Starring: William Holden; Kim Novak; Betty Field; Susan Strasberg; Cliff Robertson; Rosalind Russell
- Cinematography: James Wong Howe
- Edited by: William A. Lyon; Charles Nelson
- Music by: George Duning
- Distributed by: Columbia Pictures
- Release dates: December 6, 1955 (Warner Beverly Hills Theater, premiere); February 17, 1956 (U.S.)
- Running time: 115 minutes
- Country: United States
- Language: English
- Budget: $3 million
- Box office: $9 million (worldwide rentals)

Picnic is a 1955 American romantic comedy-drama film directed by Joshua Logan, adapted by Daniel Taradash from William Inge's 1953 Pulitzer Prize-winning play. It stars William Holden, Kim Novak, and Rosalind Russell, with Betty Field, Susan Strasberg, and Cliff Robertson in supporting roles.

The film dramatizes 24 hours in the life of a small Kansas town in the mid-20th century during the Labor Day holiday. It is the story of an outsider whose appearance disrupts and rearranges the lives of those whom he encounters.

The film was released by Columbia Pictures on December 6, 1955. It was a commercial success and was nominated for six Academy Awards, including Best Picture and Best Supporting Actor (Arthur O'Connell), winning two. Joshua Logan also won the Golden Globe Award for Best Director.

== Plot ==
On the morning of Labor Day 1955, a freight train brings vagrant Hal Carter to a Kansas town to visit his fraternity friend Alan Benson. While he stays with kind Helen Potts, Hal also meets Alan's girlfriend Madge Owens, her sister Millie, and their mother Flo. Alan shows the "same old Hal" around his family's sprawling grain-elevator operations and promises Hal a steady job as a "wheat scooper."

Alan has invited Hal to attend the town's Labor Day picnic, where they encounter Rosemary, a middle-aged schoolteacher accompanied by her friend Howard Bevans. Madge is crowned the seasonal Queen of Neewollah. Rosemary, intoxicated, interrupts Hal dancing with Madge, demanding he dance with her. When Hal resists, she tears his shirt. Millie runs off, jealously convinced everyone feels "Madge is the pretty one." Her mother Flo witnesses Howard discover an empty alcohol bottle and Rosemary blames Hal for giving liquor to her underage daughter. Embittered by Hal's rejection, Rosemary accuses him of not acting his age.

Madge follows Hal to Alan's car and they drive to the river where he confesses he was sent to reform school as a boy and he considers his whole life to be a failure. They kiss and promise to meet after she finishes work the next evening. Hal returns the car to Alan's house to find Alan has called the police to arrest him. Hal flees to Howard's apartment, to find Howard contemplating Rosemary's pleas that he marry her.

At the Owens house, Madge and Millie cry themselves to sleep in their shared room. Howard arrives the next morning, intending to tell Rosemary he wants to wait, but she misunderstands his appearance to be acceptance and he goes along with it. Howard tells Madge that Hal is hiding in his car but Hal slips away before the other women gleefully decorate it. Howard and Rosemary happily drive off to the Ozarks.

Hal meets Madge by a shed, tells her he loves her and asks her to marry him in Tulsa where he can work as a hotel bellhop and elevator operator. Mrs. Owens discovers them and threatens to call the police. Madge and Hal embrace and kiss, and Hal runs to catch a passing freight train, crying out "You love me! You love me!" Madge hasn't agreed, and inside the house, Millie tells her to "do something bright" for once. Madge packs a small suitcase and, despite her mother's tears, boards a bus for Tulsa.

== Cast ==
- William Holden as Hal Carter
- Kim Novak as Marjorie 'Madge' Owens
- Rosalind Russell as Rosemary Sydney
- Betty Field as Flo Owens
- Susan Strasberg as Mildred 'Millie' Owens
- Cliff Robertson as Alan Benson
- Arthur O'Connell as Howard Bevans
- Verna Felton as Helen Potts
- Reta Shaw as Irma Kronkite
- Elizabeth Wilson as Christine Schoenwalder
- Raymond Bailey as Mr. Benson
- Nick Adams as Bomber
- Phyllis Newman as Juanita Badger - Cool Girl

== Production ==
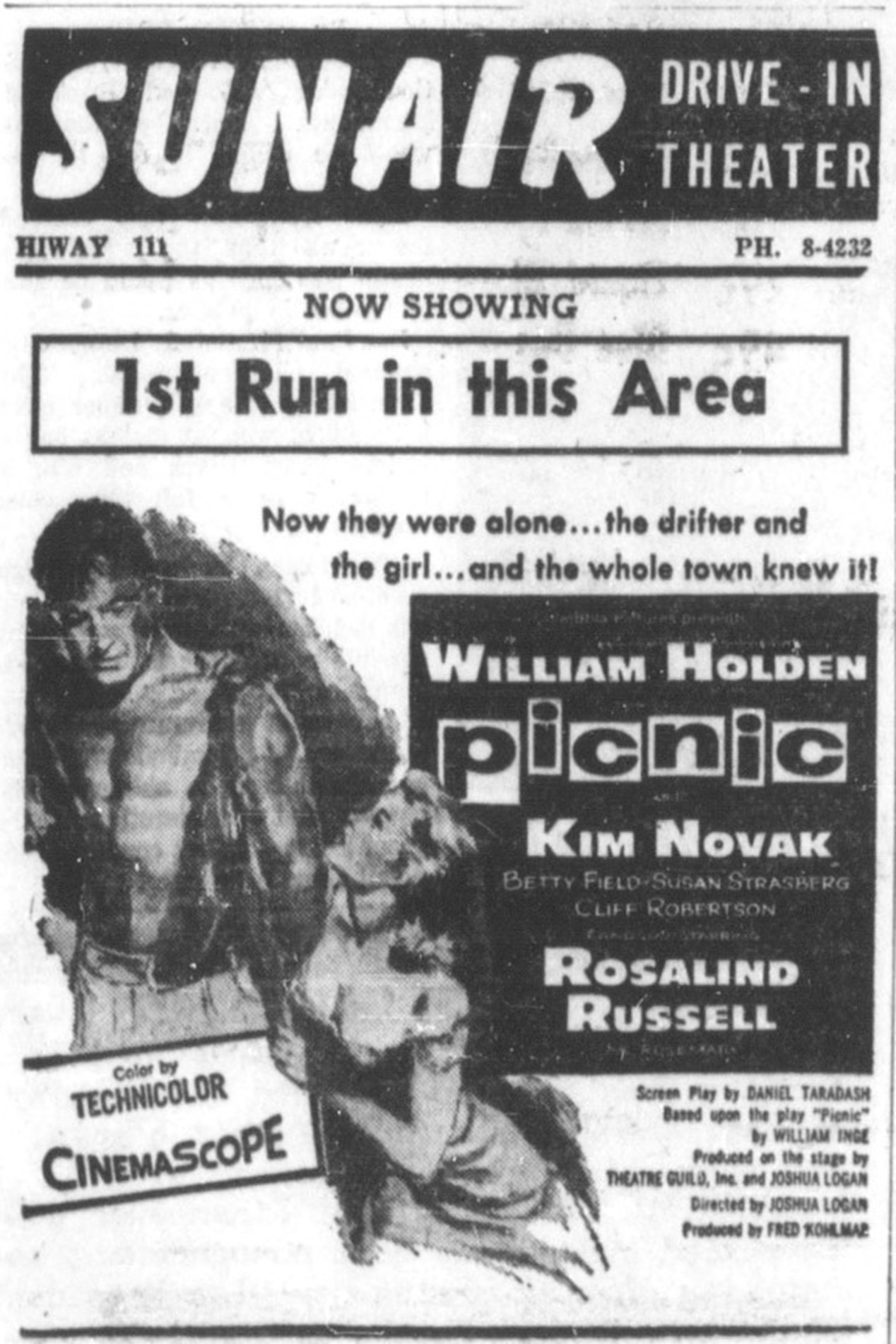
Drive-in advertisement from 1956

Columbia Pictures acquired the screen rights to William Inge's play Picnic for $350,000 in September 1953. Daniel Taradash once indicated that Columbia studio head Harry Cohn had offered him the opportunity to direct Picnic in exchange for writing the script. However, Joshua Logan, who also directed the play on Broadway, was hired instead. Logan had previously directed I Met My Love Again (1938) and Picnic would be the second feature film he directed in 17 years.

=== Casting ===
William Holden had one film left on his contract with Columbia Pictures. When Cohn offered Picnic, Holden, who was 37 years old at the time, had considered himself too old for the lead role as Hal Carter and declined. He once complained, "I'm too damned old and too conservative to do a striptease." Holden's talent agent persuaded him to take the role, and he agreed. However, he settled for a paltry salary of $30,000 instead of the $250,000 he would have otherwise earned. To prepare for the role, Holden exercised at the gym and shaved his chest for the shirtless shots. Logan was reportedly nervous about his dancing for the "Moonglow" scene. Thus, he took Holden to Kansas roadhouses where he practiced steps in front of jukeboxes with choreographer Miriam Nelson.

According to one account, Cohn had pushed for Kim Novak, who was under contract to Columbia, to be cast as Madge. "Take her, or I'll get a new director," Cohn reportedly once told Logan. However, Logan disputed this account, in which he stated Cohn had merely suggested Novak for the part, then, but did not insist on it. He felt Novak was very close to the character after he had discussed the part with her. However, Logan felt Novak's cropped, platinum blonde hair was ill-suited for the part and screen tested her twice with a waist-long auburn wig.

While Novak was auditioning, Janice Rule, who originated the role as Madge on Broadway, was suggested by Logan for a screen test. Rule was allowed to apply her own makeup for the first audition, in which she returned with "her face shaded so grotesquely that I wondered if she had used her own mirror." She was sent back, but her second test went over poorly. Taradash pushed for Carroll Baker, who had done a screen test, but Logan felt that she was too young.

Eileen Heckart had played the school teacher Rosemary Sydney during its first Broadway run, but Harry Cohn wanted a bigger name, so Rosalind Russell was cast. This was her first Hollywood film following her Tony Award-winning performance in Wonderful Town (1953).

Paul Newman was under contract to Warner Bros. and was unable to reprise his role as Alan. Logan instead cast Cliff Robertson, who had been in a touring company of Mister Roberts and in a revival of Logan's The Wisteria Trees.

For the part of Millie, Logan had wanted Kim Stanley, who also originated the role on stage, but felt she would appear too old on film. Susan Strasberg, the daughter of prominent Method drama teachers Lee and Paula Strasberg, was recommended and cast after she was given a screen test.

Reta Shaw, Elizabeth Wilson and Arthur O'Connell were the three actors who reprised their roles from the original Broadway production.

=== Locations ===
Picnic was mostly shot on location around Hutchinson, Kansas. Other Kansas locations include:

- Halstead - Riverside Park is where the Labor Day picnic scenes were filmed. The merry-go-round and cable suspension footbridge, which spans the Little Arkansas River, still exist in the park on the north side of Halstead.
- Nickerson - the location of the two adjacent houses for the Owens family home and Mrs. Potts. It is where Hal (William Holden) "jumps a freight" to go to Tulsa and where Madge boards a bus in the last scene. 211 and 207 South Nickerson Street are the locations of the two houses, Avenue H was used for the final bus scene. In the years since the filming, the rail spur was removed and replaced by Avenue G street, and the school was replaced with a modern school.
- Salina - the opening scene where Hal jumps off a train, then meets Alan (Cliff Robertson) at Alan's father's large house. This location is also used for the Saline River (where Madge kisses Hal) and the scene where Hal escapes from the police by running under a waterfall. The train and river scene is located northeast of the intersection of Iron Avenue and 4th Street.
- Sterling - where the pre-picnic swim in the lake was filmed. It was filmed at the Sterling Lake near Van Buren Street.

During filming of the picnic scenes in Halstead, Kansas, a tornado swept through the area, forcing the cast and crew to take cover. While the tornado spared the set, it destroyed the city of Udall, Kansas, and the film crew drove their trucks and equipment there to help clean up the damage.

== Reception ==
=== Box office ===
Picnic earned $6.3 million in box office rentals in the United States and Canada and $9 million worldwide.

=== Critical reaction ===
Gene Arneel of Variety felt the "picnic scenes are dazzling, rapidly paced and abounding color. The dramatic material has strength and sting, as adapted by Taradash and staged by Logan. Picnic runs 115 minutes, but though sharply edited, this is excessive. Music and all technical work are in keeping with the top quality of Kohlmar's production." Harrison's Reports called Picnic "[a]n excellent comedy-drama, adapted from the Broadway success of the same name. Photographed in CinemaScope and Technicolor, the poignant story offers an arresting blend of drama, comedy and compassion, centering around characters who are credible and human."

Philip K. Scheuer of the Los Angeles Times wrote Picnic was "one of the more distinguished films of 1955. Like William Inge's earlier Come Back, Little Sheba, this brew of frustration and sex, from the Pulitzer Prize and Critics Award play, comes to a slow boil. Some of it, thereafter, is pretty scalding stuff." The Chicago Tribune wrote: "It is a taut two hours of masterful movie making adapted from the Pulitzer prize winning play by William Inge, deftly shaped for the screen by Daniel Taradash, and sensitively directed by Joshua Logan. The story presents a cross-section of many lives, but the telling is never hurried, the detail is impressive, and the performances are some of the finest of the year."

The performances of the cast were mostly well-received. The Chicago Tribune described William Holden as "brash and virile and somehow pathetic" yet "memorable", Rosalind Russell was "almost frighteningly good", Kim Novak was "beautiful but wooden as the pretty Madge, and little Susan Strasberg is effective as her younger sister, who wishes she were beautiful instead of bright." Harrison's Reports felt Holden and Novak were both "effective" though they felt the "top acting honors" went to Russell and Arthur O'Connell. Kate Cameron of the New York Daily News praised Russell for her "outstanding performance in the role of a love-starved school-teacher and while she may be accused of over-acting, it seems to me that the part, as written, calls for a forced display of histrionics, which Miss Russell delivers in full measure." Variety also wrote Russell was a "standout, moving in her plea for marriage, amusing as she pretends indifference to men and pitiable in her whiskey-inspired outburst against Holden."

On the other hand, A. H. Weiler of The New York Times wrote: "A viewer may have misgivings about the casting of William Holden in the role of the vagrant. He appears a mite too old for the part. But his portrayal is not callow ... Kim Novak, as the object of his affection, is a joy to behold." A cover story in Time magazine said that Holden was "miscast" as the film's "sex bomb," but nonetheless, "Every woman in the vicinity—to wit, Betty Field, Kim Novak, Susan Strasberg and Rosalind Russell—falls flat, or wants to."

On the review aggregator website Rotten Tomatoes, 45% of 11 critics' reviews are positive.

=== Awards and nominations ===
Award	Category	Nominee(s)	Result	Ref.
Academy Awards	Best Motion Picture	Fred Kohlmar	Nominated	
Academy Awards	Best Director	Joshua Logan	Nominated	
Academy Awards	Best Supporting Actor	Arthur O'Connell	Nominated	
Academy Awards	Best Art Direction – Color	Art Direction: William Flannery and Jo Mielziner; Set Decoration: Robert Priestley	Won	
Academy Awards	Best Film Editing	Charles Nelson and William Lyon	Won	
Academy Awards	Best Scoring of a Dramatic or Comedy Picture	George Duning	Nominated	
Belgian Film Critics Association	Grand Prix		Won	
British Academy Film Awards	Best Film from any Source		Nominated	
British Academy Film Awards	Best Foreign Actor	William Holden	Nominated	
British Academy Film Awards	Best Foreign Actress	Kim Novak	Nominated	
British Academy Film Awards	Most Promising Newcomer to Film	Susan Strasberg	Nominated	
Cahiers du Cinéma	Best Film	Joshua Logan	Nominated	
Directors Guild of America Awards	Outstanding Directorial Achievement in Motion Pictures	Joshua Logan	Nominated	
Golden Globe Awards	Best Director – Motion Picture	Joshua Logan	Won	
Nastro d'Argento	Best Foreign Film	Joshua Logan	Nominated	
National Board of Review Awards	Top Ten Films		9th Place	
Writers Guild of America Awards	Best Written American Drama	Daniel Taradash	Nominated	

The film is recognized by American Film Institute in these lists:

- 2002: AFI's 100 Years... 100 Passions – #59
- 2005: AFI's 100 Years of Film Scores – Nominated

== Music ==
The film's "Theme from Picnic", composed by George Duning and Steve Allen (although Allen's lyrics were not used in the film), was released in three versions:

- "Moonglow and Theme from 'Picnic'" by Morris Stoloff and the Columbia Pictures Orchestra reached #1 on the Billboard Top 100 and remained on the chart for 27 weeks.
- "Moonglow and Theme from 'Picnic'" by George Cates and His Orchestra reached #4 on the Billboard Top 100 and remained on the chart for 22 weeks.
- "Picnic", a vocal version by the McGuire Sisters, reached #13 on the Billboard Top 100 and remained on the chart for 20 weeks. The single was a double A-side with "Delilah Jones", a #37 hit.

At one point, the three singles were in the Top 40 simultaneously, and the Stoloff and Cates versions ranked consecutively at #3 and #4 in the Top 100 chart of June 2, 1956.

The soundtrack album reached #2 on the Billboard album chart, where it remained for 56 weeks beginning in February 1956.

== Subliminal marketing hoax ==
In 1957, marketing researcher James Vicary said he had included subliminal messages such as "eat popcorn" and "drink Coca-Cola" in public screenings of Picnic for six weeks, claiming sales of Coca-Cola and popcorn increased 18.1% and 57.8% respectively. However, after being unable to replicate the results, Vicary later admitted that he had falsified the data.

== Other adaptations ==
Picnic was remade for television twice. The first was in 1986, directed by Marshall W. Mason and starring Gregory Harrison, Jennifer Jason Leigh, Michael Learned, Rue McClanahan and Dick Van Patten. The second remake was in 2000, starring Josh Brolin, Gretchen Mol, Bonnie Bedelia, Jay O. Sanders and Mary Steenburgen. The adaptation by Shelley Evans was directed by Ivan Passer.

== See also ==
- List of American films of 1955

== Bibliography ==
- Logan, Joshua (1978). Movie Stars, Real People and Me. New York: Delacorte Press. pp. 5–21. ISBN 978-0-440-16117-2.
- Thomas, Bob (1983). Golden Boy: The Untold Story of William Holden. New York: St. Martin's Press. ISBN 978-0-312-33697-4.
- Thomas, Bob (1990). King Cohn: The Life and Times of Hollywood Mogul Harry Cohn. McGraw-Hill. ISBN 978-0-070-64261-4.
