= Moonglow and Theme from Picnic =

Single by Morris Stoloff
- B-side: "Theme from Picnic" (George Duning)
- Released: 1956
- Recorded: March 8, 1956
- Label: Decca 29888
- Songwriter(s): Moonglow: Will Hudson, Irving Mills and Eddie DeLange. Theme from Picnic: George Duning

"Moonglow and Theme from Picnic" is a 1956-released medley of both "Moonglow" (1933) and "Theme from Picnic" (1955), by Morris Stoloff. It is from the film Picnic, starring William Holden and Kim Novak.

== Background ==
The 1933 piece, "Moonglow", was written by Will Hudson, Irving Mills and Eddie DeLange. The 1955 piece, "Theme from Picnic", was written by George Duning. (Steve Allen set lyrics to the tune, and is credited on vocal versions of the song as a co-author, but not on the hit instrumental versions by Stoloff and others.)

The Stoloff version spent three weeks at number-one on the Billboard Most Played by Jockeys music chart in the spring of 1956. The B-side to the Stoloff version is "Theme from Picnic" by George Duning.

== Other versions ==
- The medley was also covered by George Cates in 1956, charting at number 4 on the charts.
