= Cyril Stapleton =

English musician and bandleader (1914–1974)

- Born: Horace Cyril Stapleton; 31 January 1914; Mapperley, Nottingham, England
- Died: 25 February 1974 (aged 60) London, England
- Genres: Jazz, popular music
- Occupations: Musician; Band leader
- Instrument: Violin
- Years active: 1926–1974

Horace Cyril Stapleton (31 January 1914 – 25 February 1974) was an English violinist and jazz bandleader.

== Biography ==
Horace Cyril Stapleton was born in Mapperley, Nottingham, England, He began playing violin at the age of seven, and played on local radio at the age of 12. He performed on the BBC Radio often in his teenage years at their Birmingham studios, and played in film orchestras accompanying silent films. Stapleton attended Trinity College of Music in London, and played in a dance band there led by Henry Hall. This ensemble also played on the BBC and made several recordings for EMI. After losing his position in the band, he went back to Nottingham and formed his own.

In the 1930s, Stapleton toured South Africa with the Jack Payne Orchestra. Later in the decade, Stapleton and his band relocated to London; they won their own spot performing on the BBC in 1939. World War II interrupted Stapleton's musical career, as he joined the Royal Air Force late in 1939. While enlisted, he played in the RAF Symphony Orchestra.

Following the war, Stapleton played with the London Symphony Orchestra, the National Symphony Orchestra of London, and the Philharmonia Orchestra. In 1947, he recreated his band, and quickly won back slots on the BBC; among the singers he accompanied were Dick James and Frank Sinatra. As leader of the BBC Show Band, Stapleton became a fixture on the English musical scene, broadcast across the nation throughout the mid-1950s. Players in the ensemble who went on to gain a profile in their own right included Bert Weedon, Bill McGuffie, Tommy Whittle, and Matt Monro.

In 1957, the BBC disbanded the Show Band, and Stapleton immediately reassembled his own group The Cyril Stapleton Orchestra. He even managed two chart hits in the United States with the instrumental "The Italian Theme" (Number 25, 1956) and "The Children's Marching Song (Nick Nack Paddy Whack)" (Number 13, 1959). The latter record sold one million copies. Stapleton continued to tour and record into the 1970s; in 1965 he also became head of A&R for Pye Records.

Stapleton died in 1974, at the age of 59.

== Discography ==
- "Elephant Tango" (1955) – UK number 19
- "Blue Star (The Medic Theme)" * (1955) – UK number 2 – global million seller.
- "The Italian Theme" (1956) – UK number 18
- "The Happy Whistler" † (1956) – UK number 22
- Strings on Parade (1954) – (Decca LF 1184)
- "Forgotten Dreams" (1957) – UK number 27
- Come'n Get It (1958) – (Decca LK 4286)
- Song of the Golden West (1958) – (London LL 1723
- All Time Big Band Hits (1959) – (Richmond Stereo, a product of London Records)
- Cyril Stapleton Plays Glenn Miller (1969) - (Pye Records NSPL 18298)

*Cyril Stapleton Orchestra featuring Julie Dawn

†Cyril Stapleton Orchestra featuring Desmond Lane, penny whistle
