= Julie Dawn =

English singer (1919–2000)

- Born: Rosalba Juliana Mostosi; 2 August 1919; St Pancras, London, England
- Died: 18 May 2000 (aged 80); Kensington and Chelsea, London, England
- Occupations: Singer, radio presenter

Rosalba Juliana Blake (2 August 1919 – 18 May 2000), better known by her professional name, Julie Dawn, was an English singer with leading dance bands in the 1940s and 1950s, making recordings and radio broadcasts. In her later years, she presented radio programmes.

== Early life ==
Dawn was born Rosalba Juliana Mostosi in St Pancras, London, England, in 1919. Her parents were Italian immigrants; her father was the head waiter at the Savoy Hotel in London. From the age of 13 to 15, she took a piano and music course at the Guildhall School of Music.

== Career ==
In 1939, after singing at a party given by the Quaglino brothers, Dawn was engaged by them to sing at their restaurant. She changed her name on the advice of the showbusiness journalist Collie Knox, and in late 1939, as Julie Dawn, she made her first radio broadcast.

After Italy entered the Second World War, her parents were interned until 1945. Dawn joined Harry Roy's band in 1940 and toured with them; he left them in 1941 and joined the Eric Winstone Quartet. She made recordings with him after he formed a band, and also with Harry Leader and Billy Thorburn.

In 1944 she worked with Carroll Gibbons and the Savoy Orpheans. For three weeks she toured France, Belgium and Holland with Geraldo to entertain troops, and towards the end of the war she performed in Germany with Eric Winstone.

After the war she sang with Art Thompson at the Embassy Club, and then with the Lew Stone band. For two years she broadcast three times a week with the BBC Showband led by Cyril Stapleton.

She later became a presenter on BBC Radio 2 with a programme that ran for five years. From 1977 onwards, she presented Julie Dawn's Penfriend Programme, a successful Radio 2 programme which ran for 10 years. Broadcast three times a week, people who lived alone were put in touch with others in similar circumstances.

== Personal life and death ==
Dawn was married twice. She first married Edwin Mordue in 1950. The marriage ended in divorce. She then married David Blake in 1981; he died in 1992. Dawn herself died in 2000, aged 79.
