= In the Middle of the House =

Novelty song written by Bob Hilliard

"In the Middle of the House" is a novelty song written by Bob Hilliard. It was performed by Vaughn Monroe and separately by Rusty Draper in 1956. Each was released as a single. Monroe's version reached number 11 on Billboard Magazine's Most Played by Jockeys chart and number 21 on the magazine's Top 100 chart in September 1956. Draper's version, released only weeks later, peaked lower on the Most Played by Jockeys chart, climbing to number 24. Draper outdid Monroe by one spot on the Top 100, peaking at number 20. The song was quite popular in the UK, as it was covered by Alma Cogan (# 20), Jimmy Parkinson (# 20), and the Johnston Brothers (# 27). All versions were in the UK charts simultaneously in November 1956.

In the song, a railroad, which is heard at the intro and the outro of the song, runs through the middle of the house. The narrator mentions a family friend, whom the narrator despises, is sent to the middle of the house, where the moving train presumably kills them. Also, a bill collector is sent to the middle of the house, where another oncoming train kills him. In the end, the narrator states that they are singing the song from the middle of the house, at which point the sound of a railroad train leaves the assumption that they have been killed.
