= The Happy Whistler =

Single by Don Robertson
- B-side: "You're Free to Go"
- Released: March 1956
- Genre: Pop
- Length: 2:25
- Label: Capitol
- Songwriter(s): Don Robertson

Don Robertson singles chronology
"The Happy Whistler" (1956)	"Every Day That I Live" (1956)

"The Happy Whistler" is a song written and performed by Don Robertson. It reached #6 on the U.S. pop chart and #8 on the UK Singles Chart in 1956.

The song was ranked #43 on Billboard magazine's Top 50 singles of 1956.

== Other charting versions ==
- Cyril Stapleton featuring Desmond Lane released a version of the song as a single which reached #22 on the UK Singles Chart in 1956.

== Other versions ==
- Ronnie Ronalde released a single version in the UK in 1956 - Columbia D.B.3785
- Eddie "Lockjaw" Davis Trio released a version of the song as a single in 1956, but it did not chart.
- Boots Randolph released a version of the song on his 1960 album Boots Randolph's Yakety Sax.
- Ernie Fields released a version of the song as a single in 1961, but it did not chart.
- The Echoes released a version of the song as a single in 1963, but it did not chart.
- Jimmie Haskell and His Orchestra released a version of the song as the B-side to their 1965 single "Boom".
- Glenn Yarbrough released a version of the song in 1965 featuring lyrics.
- Sandy Nelson released a version of the song on his 1970 album Groovy.
- Reginald Dixon released a version of the song as part of a medley with the songs "Willie Can" and "The Poor People of Paris" on his 2009 compilation album Reginald Dixon at the Organ.

== Popular culture ==
- In the 1960s and 1970s, "The Happy Whistler" was the theme song for the Channel 2 children's TV show, "Doctor Max and Mombo" based out of Cedar Rapids, Iowa.
