= Moonglow (song) =

Song
- Published: 1934 by Mills Music
- Released: 1933
- Composers: Will Hudson and Irving Mills
- Lyricist: Eddie DeLange

"Moonglow", also known as "Moonglow and Love", is a 1933 popular song and jazz standard. The music was by Will Hudson and Irving Mills and the words were by Eddie DeLange.

== Musicological notes ==
Ignoring the seldom recorded verse, "Moonglow" is a 32-bar tune in the form of AABA.

"Moonglow" appears in jazz fake books and lead sheets in the key of G, though it is also thought to originally be in the key of C.

The melodic riff of the A section is composed of a repeated minor third interval followed by a major third interval and then a repeated note. Harmonic movement is largely in an ascending circle of fourths, or with descending chromatic substitutions, but there is also movement between thirds or between major and minor seventh chords. Minor seventh chords are often played in first inversion in this tune, and may therefore be thought of and notated as six chords of the relative major.

Rhythmically "Moonglow" is in 4/4 time. It is a foxtrot, typically played at a slow tempo, although some performers, notably Art Tatum, have played it faster. The rhythm is syncopated. Jazz players usually swing the eighth notes.

Writer George T. Simon, while working on a compilation of music for The Big Band Songbook, contacted composer Will Hudson regarding "Moonglow", and Hudson explained how the tune came about. "It happened very simply. Back in the early '30s, I had a band at the Graystone Ballroom in Detroit, and I needed a theme song. So I wrote 'Moonglow'."

== Selected discography ==
"Moonglow" was first recorded by Joe Venuti in 1933, with subsequent recordings by Duke Ellington, Cab Calloway, Benny Goodman, Ethel Waters, and Art Tatum in 1934. The tune has since become a jazz standard, performed and recorded numerous times by a wide array of musical talents. The Benny Goodman Quartet with Teddy Wilson, Gene Krupa and Lionel Hampton made a famous version of the song in 1936, Artie Shaw recorded it in 1941, and Harry James recorded it in 1946 (released in 1950) on Columbia 38943.

Bing Crosby recorded the song in 1956 for use on his radio show and it was subsequently included in the box set The Bing Crosby CBS Radio Recordings (1954-56) issued by Mosaic Records (catalog MD7-245) in 2009. Other prominent vocalists who have recorded "Moonglow" include June Christy (1946), Billie Holiday (1952) and Sarah Vaughan (1962). A recording by George Cates and his Orchestra reached number four. The Coasters released a version on their 1960 album, One by One.

=== Jazz sessionography ===
As of July 2016, in jazz alone, "Moonglow" is credited for having been recorded 572 times—which includes studio sessions, unreleased masters, live performances, and radio transcriptions ... according to The Jazz Discography, a print and digital resource for jazz recordings. The 572 count does not include re-releases, which often far outnumber the sessions.

== Selected filmography ==
In the 1950s a medley of the song and George Duning's "Theme from Picnic", orchestrated by Johnny Warrington (1911–1978), became quite popular, especially in an instrumental recording by Morris Stoloff, conductor of the film version by the Columbia Pictures Orchestra. Duning wrote the film's theme to counterpoint "Moonglow". Stoloff's recording spent three weeks at number one on the U.S. Billboard Hot 100 in 1956, and became a gold record. It is also featured in Martin Scorsese's film The Aviator (2004), when Leonardo DiCaprio (as Howard Hughes) and Cate Blanchett (as Katharine Hepburn) fly over Los Angeles at night in one of Hughes' private planes. In a 1961 episode of The Twilight Zone (S3/Ep08, "It's a Good Life"), 6-year-old Anthony Fremont enjoys hearing "Moonglow" played on the piano during a surprise birthday party for an ill-fated neighbor. The evening country club scene in Caddyshack (1980) opens with the band playing "Moonglow". In the movie 42 (2013), about Jackie Robinson's advent into baseball's previously white-only major leagues, "Moonglow" plays in the background in the hotel where Rachel and Jackie Robinson have just been married.
