= The Jimmy Parkinson Show =

1959 Australian TV series

- Genre: Music television
- Starring: Jimmy Parkinson
- Country of origin: Australia
- Original language: English

Original release
- Network: ATN-7
- Release: 1959 – 1960

The Jimmy Parkinson Show was an Australian television series which aired 1959 to 1960 on Sydney station ATN-7. It was a weekly half-hour music series. Like most 1950s Australian series, it aired in a single city only.

An article in the Sydney Morning Herald newspaper, while not mentioning the series by name, does provide some information on the series. It described Parkinson as a "balladist", and called him "one of the most promising performers that TV has produced in Sydney".
