= Mountain Greenery =

- Sheet music, 1926

Song
- Published: 1926
- Composer: Richard Rodgers
- Lyricist: Lorenz Hart

"Mountain Greenery" is a popular song composed by Richard Rodgers, with lyrics by Lorenz Hart for the musical The Garrick Gaieties (1926). It was first performed on stage by Sterling Holloway. Mel Tormé had a top-five hit in the UK with his cover version in 1956.

== Lyrics ==
The lyrics display Hart's characteristic use of enjambement and witty and unexpected internal rhymes e.g. 'lover let' and 'coverlet' and 'keener re...' rhymed with 'beanery':

{Verse 1}

On the first of May

It is moving Day

Spring is here, so

Blow your job,

Throw your job away

Now’s the time to trust

To your wanderlust

In the city’s dust you wait

Must you wait?

Just you wait!

[Chorus 1]

In a mountain greenery

Where God paints the scenery

Just two crazy people together

While you love your lover, let

blue skies be your coverlet

If it rains we’ll laugh at the weather

And if you’re good

I’ll search for wood

So you can cook

While I stand look-

ing

Beans could get no keener re-

ception in a beanery

Bless our mountain greenery home.

{Interlude}

When the world was young, Old

father Adam with

Sin did grapple

So we’re entitled to

Just one apple

I mean

To make apple sauce.

Underneath the bough

We’ll learn a lesson from

Mr. Omar

Beneath the eyes of no pa and no ma.

Old lady Nature is boss.

Washing dishes

Catching fishes

In the running stream,

We’ll curse the smell of

Citronella,

Even when we dream,

Head upon the ground

Your downy pillow is just a boulder

I’ll have new dimples before I’m older

But life is peaches and cream.

[Chorus 2 partial]

And if you’re good

I’ll search for wood

So you can cook

While I stand look-

ing

Beans could get no keener re-

ception in a beanery

Bless our mountain greenery home.

{Verse 2}

Simple cooking means

More than French cuisines

I’ve a banquet planned, which is

Sandwiches

And beans

Coffee’s just as grand

With a little sand

Eat and you’ll grow fatter, boy,

S’matter boy?

Atta boy!

[Chorus 3]

In a mountain greenery

Where God paints the scenery

Just two crazy people together,

How we love sequestering

Where no pests are pestering

No Dear mama hold us in tether,

Mosquitoes here

Won’t bite you dear,

I’ll let them sting

Me on the fin-

ger.

We could find no cleaner re-

treat from life’s machinery

Than our mountain greenery home
