= Jimmy Young (broadcaster) =

British disc jockey and singer (1921–2016)

Sir Jimmy Young CBE
- Born: Leslie Ronald Young; 21 September 1921; Cinderford, Gloucestershire, England
- Died: 7 November 2016 (aged 95); Chiswick, London, England
- Other names: JY, Jimbo
- Education: East Dean Grammar School
- Occupations: Singer; DJ; radio personality
- Years active: 1950–2002
- Employer(s): BBC Radio 1 (1967-73); BBC Radio 2 (1973–2002)
- Known for: "Unchained Melody", "The Man from Laramie"
- Spouses: Wendy Wilkinson (m. 1946, divorced) Sally Douglas (m. 1950, divorced) Alicia Padstow (m. 1996)
- Children: 1

Sir Leslie Ronald Young (21 September 1921 – 7 November 2016), known professionally as Jimmy Young, was an English singer, disc jockey and radio personality. Early in his career, in the 1950s, he had two number ones, "Unchained Melody" and "The Man from Laramie", both in 1955. He also had several other top ten hits in the UK singles chart, but he subsequently became better known for his long-running show on BBC Radio 2, The JY Prog, which ran from 1973 until 2002.

== Early life ==
Young was born in Cinderford, Gloucestershire on 21 September 1921. The son of a baker and a dressmaker, he attended East Dean Grammar School. Young nearly died from bronchitis, double pneumonia and pleurisy as a child. He excelled at boxing and rugby, playing for Cinderford RFC and later turning down a place with Wigan's rugby league team.

After his parents divorced in 1939, he left for South Wales to work as an electrician. Young later joined the RAF, becoming a PT instructor, staying until 1949.

== Singing career ==
Young signed to the new Polygon Records in 1950, joining Petula Clark, Louis Prima and Dorothy Squires. All his recordings on the label were conducted by Ron Goodwin. Goodwin later said he always liked working with Young "because he was always so enthusiastic. He thought everything we did was going to be a hit." The most popular was "Too Young" which he recorded in 1951, but this was before the days of UK record charts which didn't start until November 1952, so the record books do not list it. The song was a big sheet music seller at the time and was a cover version of the Nat King Cole original. There were also two duets with Petula Clark that year, "Mariandl" (b/w "Broken Heart").

In 1952, he signed a recording contract with Decca. Young enjoyed Top 10 successes with "Eternally", "Chain Gang" and "More" (with which he surpassed Perry Como's American original in the British Singles Chart listings). His most successful year as a recording artist was 1955, when "Unchained Melody" (from the film Unchained) and "The Man from Laramie" (from the film of the same name) were both number one hits. He returned to the UK Top 20 after a lengthy absence in 1963 with "Miss You" and continued to release singles until the late 1960s. However, after the success of Elvis Presley, he became anxious, depressed and increasingly dependent on sleeping pills. In February 1960, he started to have thoughts of suicide, and one friend told him to see an astrologer, Katina Theodossiou. Young said later, that "She said I was going to be a great success...there is absolutely no way with your chart you can commit suicide. In actual fact you're going to be around so long they're going to have to take you off the field and shoot you". Young later credited her with saving his career. Young said "She forecast that my future lay in interviewing people, not singing".

== Disc jockey and radio broadcaster ==
After a period with Radio Luxembourg, Young joined the BBC. He became a host of Housewives' Choice, on the BBC Light Programme, and later he became one of the first disc jockeys on BBC Radio 1, presenting the weekday mid-morning show from 1967 to 1973. He then joined BBC Radio 2 in 1973, where he presented a daily lunchtime news and current affairs programme. The show (which he referred to as "The JY Prog"), ran from 2 July 1973 to 20 December 2002.

He developed a popular approach to current affairs and regularly interviewed Margaret Thatcher while she was Prime Minister. He broadcast from around the world, including several live shows from Moscow, the first in 1977, and interviewed every British Prime Minister from 1964 to 2010. His theme music was "Town Talk" by Ken Woodman & His Piccadilly Brass. "BFN" ('Bye for now') was one of his catchphrases.

Although he was offered the opportunity to present a weekend current affairs programme, he turned it down. His radio slot was taken over by the former Newsnight presenter, Jeremy Vine. Shortly after leaving and retiring from the BBC, Young wrote a newspaper column criticising his former employer for instances of "brutality", and making clear that it had not been his idea to leave. He declined lunch with his successor and the pair never met.

He continued to write a weekly column for the Sunday Express newspaper until he retired from this role in November 2014. He did present a Christmas Day show in 2003 on BBC Radio Gloucestershire. On the same day he also appeared on Loose Ends on BBC Radio 4.

Young returned to BBC Radio 2 in 2011 with a special one-hour programme in celebration of his 90th birthday. Sir Jimmy Young at 90, broadcast on 20 September 2011, heard him in conversation with his friend and former sparring partner Ken Bruce, looking back over his career. In March 2012 Young returned to presenting on Radio 2 after over nine years when he joined Desmond Carrington on a weekly show entitled Icons of the '50s. His final radio appearance was in February 2016 when he gave a brief tribute to his former colleague Sir Terry Wogan on Radio 2's Jeremy Vine Show, the programme that replaced Young's in 2003.

== Awards ==
Young was appointed an Officer of the Order of the British Empire (OBE) in the 1979 Birthday Honours, and promoted to Commander of the Order of the British Empire (CBE) in the 1993 New Year Honours. In the 2002 New Year Honours, he was knighted for services to radio broadcasting.

== Autobiography ==
His first autobiography, J.Y.: The Autobiography of Jimmy Young, was published by W.H. Allen in 1974. His second autobiography, Forever Young: The Autobiography, was published by Hodder & Stoughton in 2003. In addition he wrote a book in 1982 simply entitled Jimmy Young that concentrated on his broadcasting career.

== Death ==
Young died at his home in Chiswick, London, on the afternoon of 7 November 2016, aged 95, with his wife Alicia by his side.

== Books ==
- Young, Jimmy (1974). J.Y.: An Autobiography of Jimmy Young. W.H. Allen. ISBN 978-0491013710.
- Young, Jimmy (2003). Forever Young: The Autobiography. Hodder & Stoughton. ISBN 978-0340734377.

== Discography ==
- "Too Young" – (1951)
- "Faith Can Move Mountains" – (1953) – UK Number 11
- "Eternally" – (1953, music by Charles Chaplin, words by Geoff Parsons) – UK Number 8
- "Unchained Melody" – (1955) – UK Number 1 (with Bob Sharples and His Music, Decca: F10502)
- "The Man from Laramie" – (1955) – UK Number 1 (with Bob Sharples and His Music, Decca: F10597)
- "Someone on Your Mind" – (1955) – UK Number 13 (with Bob Sharples and His Music) (Decca: F10640; US London 1639)
- "Chain Gang" – (1956) – UK Number 9
- "Wayward Wind" – (1956) – UK Number 27
- "Rich Man Poor Man" – (1956) – UK Number 25
- "More" – (1956) – UK Number 4
- "Round and Round" – (1957) – UK Number 30 (with the Mike Sammes Singers)
- "Miss You" – (1963) – UK Number 15
- "Unchained Melody" (re-recording) – (1964) – UK Number 43 (with the Mike Sammes Singers)
