= Chain Gang (1955 song) =

1955 song written by Sol Quasha and Herb Yakus

UK sheet music

"Chain Gang" is a 1955 song written by Sol Quasha and Herb Yakus. In 1956, a recording by American singer Bobby Scott reached number 13 on the US Billboard Hot 100, whilst a version by English singer Jimmy Young peaked at number 9 on the UK Singles Chart. A work song, its chart success followed that of the similarly themed "Sixteen Tons", a transatlantic number one for Tennessee Ernie Ford.

== Chart versions ==
=== Bobby Scott ===
"Chain Gang"

Single by Bobby Scott
- B-side: "Shadrach"
- Released: December 1955
- Genre: Pop
- Length: 2:53
- Label: ABC-Paramount
- Songwriter(s): Sol Quasha, Herb Yakus

Bobby Scott singles chronology
| "Chain Gang" (1955) | "I Had a Lover" (1956) |

Bobby Scott's version of "Chain Gang" was issued on ABC-Paramount in December 1955. The song was Scott's first pop single; the teenage musician had already backed Louis Prima and Gene Krupa as a jazz pianist. Gordon Whitey Mitchell, who played alongside Scott in the Gene Krupa Quartet, remembered him practicing his singing on tour "affecting a 'black' sound", and described "Chain Gang" as featuring "that same fake voice".

The song employs a rhythm and blues-tinged arrangement. It was included in a Billboard article rounding up 1956's rock and roll hit singles.

Scott's recording was a hit, peaking at number 13 on the Billboard Hot 100. It was the first hit for ABC-Paramount, founded in August 1955. It sold over one million copies, and was awarded a gold disc. "Chain Gang" was ultimately Scott's only hit single.

Reviewing Scott's recording, Billboard described the song as "an earthy, folksy lament that seems to be a descendant of 'Sixteen Tons'" and praised Scott's "wonderful, warm, husky charm". The song is included in Bruce Pollock's book Rock Song Index: The 7500 Most Important Songs of the Rock and Roll Era, with the writer describing it as an "early taste of jazz/rock".

=== Jimmy Young ===
"Chain Gang"

Single by Jimmy Young
- B-side: "Capri in May"
- Released: March 1956
- Genre: Pop
- Length: 2:16
- Label: Decca
- Songwriter(s): Sol Quasha, Herb Yakus

Jimmy Young singles chronology
| "Someone on Your Mind" (1955) | "Chain Gang" (1956) | "Rich Man, Poor Man" (1956) |

Jimmy Young's version of "Chain Gang", recorded with Bob Sharples and His Music, was released as a single in the United Kingdom in March 1956. The single marked a change in style for Young, who was best known for his ballad recordings. The recording employs a slapback echo effect on Young's vocal. His last line is treated with a longer, sustained tape delay.

An anonymous review in the Gramophone Record Review described the record as "quite one of the corniest attempts I've heard for some time. Poor Jimmy is completely submerged beneath all the hammering of the hard labour brigade." Max Jones of the Daily Herald described the record as "not strong-voiced enough to sell it full blast, but still likely to make a hit".

Writing in Yeah! Yeah! Yeah!: The Story of Modern Pop, British musician and journalist Bob Stanley described Young's "Chain Gang" as "just plain weird", citing the "caterwauling brass, whipcrack snare, moaning convicts" of the backing and spotlighting the song's climax in which "it trips out into proto-dub, Young's voice echoing into a void of tape delay and lonesome stand-up bass, oblique, dissolving". Stanley notes that the vocal production on "Chain Gang" bears similarities to that on "Heartbreak Hotel" but predates the Elvis Presley record's UK release.

Young's version is among the 1950s and 1960s recordings listed in Mim Scala's memoir Diary of a Teddy Boy: A Memoir of the Long Sixties.
