= Jimmy Parkinson (singer) =

Australian singer (1930–2019)

- Born: James Parkinson; 19 December 1930
- Died: 25 March 2019 (aged 88) Eastlakes, Australia
- Genres: Pop
- Occupation: Singer
- Years active: 1940s-50s
- Label: Columbia Records

James Parkinson (19 December 1930 – 25 March 2019) was an Australian singer and presenter, active in the 1950s, who had a top ten single in the UK singles charts in 1956.

== Career ==
Parkinson began his singing career as a teenager, at a ballroom in Sydney where he worked as a page boy. He became a success on Australian radio, with over 60 singles being credited to him, and was "spotted" by Ray Martin after Martin heard him sing on a demo disc; Martin did not like the song, but did like the voice. Therefore, Parkinson moved to Britain in September 1955, and landed a deal with Columbia Records, with his first single – "All At Once" –being released in November.

He had three hit singles, all coming in 1956, the biggest of them being his cover of "The Great Pretender", which made the top ten in two of the three national charts at the time (New Musical Express, Melody Maker, and Record Mirror).

He returned to Australia in 1957, and became a presenter, hosting Your Hit Parade on the 9 Network from 1957 to 1959, and The Jimmy Parkinson Show on Sydney television station ATN-7 in 1958. His television career continued into the 1960s.

Parkinson died in Eastlakes, New South Wales, in 2019, survived by his son Jason.

== Charting singles ==
Month/yr	Song	NME	MM	RM
March 1956	"The Great Pretender"	9	11	10
August 1956	"Walk Hand In Hand"	26	19	18
November 1956	"In The Middle Of The House"	20	–	–
"—" denotes releases that did not chart.
