= More (Alex Alstone and Tom Glazer song) =

Single by Perry Como
- B-side: "Glendora"
- Released: May 1956
- Genre: Pop
- Length: 2:39
- Label: RCA Victor, His Master's Voice (UK)
- Songwriters: Alex Alstone, Tom Glazer

Perry Como singles chronology
"Hot Diggity (Dog Ziggity Boom)" / "Juke Box Baby" (1956)	"More" (1956)	"Somebody Up There Likes Me" (1956)

"More" is a popular song with music by Alex Alstone and lyrics by Tom Glazer, published in 1956. The best-known version of the song was recorded by Perry Como on May 8, 1956, alongside, Mitchell Ayres and His Orchestra and The Ray Charles Singers.

It was issued as a single (RCA Victor catalog number 20-6554 on 78 rpm, 47-6554 on 45 rpm in the U.S., His Master's Voice POP-240 in the UK. It was also issued on an EP, With a Song In My Heart.

== Chart performance ==
"More" reached No. 4 on the U.S. charts and No. 10 on the UK Singles Chart. The flip side of both releases was "Glendora".

== Cover versions ==
- A recording of the song was also made in the United Kingdom by Jimmy Young. It was issued by UK Decca Records as catalog number F 10774 and reached No. 4 on the UK Singles Chart in 1956.
