= George Duning =

American musician and film composer (1908–2000)

- Born: February 25, 1908; Richmond, Indiana, U.S.
- Died: February 27, 2000 (aged 92) San Diego, California, U.S.
- Genre: Film score
- Occupation: Composer

George Duning (February 25, 1908 – February 27, 2000) was an American musician and film composer. He was born in Richmond, Indiana, and educated in Cincinnati, Ohio, at the Cincinnati Conservatory of Music, where his mentor was Mario Castelnuovo-Tedesco.

== Early career ==
In the 1940s, Duning played trumpet and piano for the Kay Kyser band, later arranging most of the music for Kyser's radio program, Kay Kyser's Kollege of Musical Knowledge. It was during the Kyser band's appearance in Carolina Blues (1944) that Duning's work was noticed, leading to a contract with Columbia Pictures. Duning joined the Navy in 1942 and served as a conductor and arranger with Armed Forces Radio.

== Film and TV career ==
Morris Stoloff signed Duning to Columbia Pictures in 1946, where he worked almost exclusively through the early 1960s, collaborating most often with director Richard Quine.

Prominent Duning scores are two of the best examples of western genre – the original 3:10 to Yuma, and Cowboy – and those he composed for films as diverse as Picnic, The World of Suzie Wong, The Devil at Four O'Clock, Bell, Book and Candle, and Toys in the Attic.

Duning shared music adaptation credit with Nelson Riddle for the successful 1957 film adaptation of the Rodgers and Hart musical Pal Joey starring Frank Sinatra and Rita Hayworth.

During his career Duning worked on more than 300 film and television scores. His notable television work includes Tightrope, Star Trek, The Big Valley, and Naked City, as well as TV miniseries such as Top of the Hill (1980), The Dream Merchants (1980), and Goliath Awaits (1981).

The quality of Duning's work remained consistently and remarkably high in any medium. His last feature film was The Man with Bogart's Face (1980). Duning retired in 1981. Nominated five times for an Academy Award, Duning never won.

Duning was an active member of the music industry, serving on the ASCAP Board of Directors from 1972 to 1985, and as ASCAP Vice President from 1978 to 1979. He also served on the board of the Academy of Motion Picture Arts and Sciences, and was active in numerous other music industry organizations. In addition to his Academy Award nominations, Duning was honored with awards from The Film Music Society, DownBeat Magazine, the Hollywood Foreign Press Association, and his home state of Indiana (1993 Indiana Composer of the Year).

== Death ==
Duning died of heart disease in San Diego, California, at age 92.

== Academy Award nominations ==
- The Eddy Duchin Story
- Picnic
- From Here to Eternity
- No Sad Songs for Me
- Jolson Sings Again

== Golden Globes nominations ==
- The World of Suzie Wong
- All the King's Men
- Cry for Happy (best song)

== Partial filmography ==
- Johnny O'Clock (1947)
- The Guilt of Janet Ames (1947)
- The Corpse Came C.O.D. (1947)
- Her Husband's Affairs (1947)
- I Love Trouble (1948)
- To the Ends of the Earth (1948)
- The Gallant Blade (1948)
- The Untamed Breed (1948)
- The Return of October (1948)
- The Dark Past (1948)
- The Man from Colorado (1948)
- Shockproof (1949)
- Slightly French (1949)
- The Undercover Man (1949)
- Johnny Allegro (1949)
- The Doolins of Oklahoma (1949)
- Lust for Gold (1949)
- Jolson Sings Again (1949)
- And Baby Makes Three (1949)
- Cargo to Capetown (1950)
- No Sad Songs for Me (1950)
- Convicted (1950)
- Between Midnight and Dawn (1950)
- Harriet Craig (1950)
- The Flying Missile (1950)
- Lorna Doone (1951)
- Two of a Kind (1951)
- Dick Turpin's Ride (aka The Lady and the Bandit) (1951)
- The Mob (1951)
- The Family Secret (1951)
- The Barefoot Mailman (1951)
- Her First Romance (1951)
- Man in the Saddle (1951)
- Scandal Sheet (1952)
- Paula (aka The Silent Voice) (1952)
- Captain Pirate (1952)
- Assignment - Paris! (1952)
- Last of the Comanches (1953)
- Salome (1953)
- Let's Do It Again (1953)
- From Here to Eternity (1953)
- Three for the Show (1955)
- The Man from Laramie (1955)
- Tight Spot (1955)
- 5 Against the House (1955)
- Bring Your Smile Along (1955)
- My Sister Eileen (1955)
- Count Three and Pray (1955)
- Queen Bee (1955)
- Three Stripes in the Sun (1955)
- Picnic (1956)
- The Eddy Duchin Story (1956)
- Storm Center (1956)
- Full of Life (1956)
- Nightfall (1957)
- The Shadow on the Window (1957)
- Jeanne Eagels (1957)
- 3:10 to Yuma (1957)
- Operation Mad Ball (1957)
- The Brothers Rico (1957)
- Cowboy (1958)
- Gunman's Walk (1958)
- Me and the Colonel (1958)
- Houseboat (1958)
- Bell, Book and Candle (1958)
- It Happened to Jane (1959)
- The Last Angry Man (1959)
- The Wreck of the Mary Deare (1959)
- Man on a String (1960)
- Strangers When We Meet (1960)
- All the Young Men (1960)
- Let No Man Write My Epitaph (1960
- The World of Suzie Wong (1960)
- The Wackiest Ship in the Army (1960)
- Cry for Happy (1961)
- Two Rode Together (1961)
- Gidget Goes Hawaiian (1961)
- The Devil at 4 O'Clock (1961)
- Sail a Crooked Ship (1961)
- 13 West Street (1962)
- The Notorious Landlady (1962)
- That Touch of Mink (1962)
- Who's Got the Action? (1962)
- Critic's Choice (1963)
- Toys in the Attic (1963)
- Island of Love (1963)
- Who's Been Sleeping in My Bed? (1963)
- Ensign Pulver (1964)
- Dear Brigitte (1965)
- My Blood Runs Cold (1965)
- Brainstorm (1965)
- Any Wednesday (1966)
- The Hardy Boys: The Mystery of the Chinese Junk (1967)
- Land's End (1968)
- Hastings Corner (1970)
- Quarantined (1970)
- But I Don't Want to Get Married! (1970)
- Yuma (1971)
- Black Noon (1971)
- The Woman Hunter (1972)
- A Great American Tragedy (1972)
- Climb an Angry Mountain (1972)
- Honor Thy Father (1973)
- Of Men and Women (1973)
- Terror in the Wax Museum (1973)
- Arnold (1973)
- The Abduction of Saint Anne (1975)
- The Father Knows Best Reunion (1977)
- Father Knows Best: Home for Christmas (1977)
- Shadow of Fear (1979)
- Top of the Hill (1980)
- The Man with Bogart's Face (1980)
- Goliath Awaits (1981)

== TV shows ==
- Alcoa Theatre (1957–1960)
- Naked City (1958–1959)
- Tightrope! (1959–1960)
- Dennis the Menace (1959–1963)
- The Farmer's Daughter (1963 TV Series: 4, Episodes)
- Breaking Point (1963 TV Series: 1, Episodes)
- No Time for Sergeants (1964 TV Series: 5, Episodes)
- Wendy and Me (1965 TV Series: 30, Episodes)
- Vacation Playhouse (1965 TV Series: 1, Episodes)
- Laredo (1965 TV Series: 1, Episodes)
- The Long, Hot Summer (1965 TV Series: 1, Episodes)
- Journey Into Fear (1966 TV Series: 1, Episodes)
- The Time Tunnel (1967 TV Series: 1, Episodes)
- The Big Valley (1965–1967 TV Series: 58, Episodes)
- Cimarron Strip (1967 TV Series: 1, Episodes)
- Judd, for the Defense (1967 TV Series: 1, Episodes
- Star Trek (1967–1968 TV Series: 3, Episodes)
- The Second Hundred Years (1967–1968 TV Series: 18, Episodes)
- Daniel Boone (1968 TV Series: 1, Episodes)
- Then Came Bronson (1969 TV Series: 4, Episodes)
- Lancer (1970 TV Series: 1, Episodes)
- The Silent Force (1970 TV Series: 1, Episodes)
- Getting Together (1971)
- Mannix (1967–1971 TV Series: 3, Episodes)
- The Partridge Family (1971–1974 TV Series: 23, Episodes)
- The Dream Merchants (1980 TV Series: 2, Episodes)
- Disneyland (1978–1982 TV Series: 3, Episodes)
- Zorro and Son (1983 TV Series: 5, Episodes)
- Law & Order (1997 TV Series: 1, Episodes)
- Star Trek: New Voyages (2004 TV Series: 1, Episodes)
