= I Almost Lost My Mind =

1949 R&B song written by Ivory Joe Hunter

Single by Ivory Joe Hunter

from the album I Get That Lonesome Feeling
- B-side: "If I Give You My Love"
- Released: December 1949
- Recorded: October 1, 1949
- Genre: Rhythm and blues
- Length: 3:10
- Label: MGM
- Songwriter: Ivory Joe Hunter

Ivory Joe Hunter singles chronology
"7th Street Boogie" (1949)	"I Almost Lost My Mind" (1949)	"I Quit My Pretty Mama" (1950)

"I Almost Lost My Mind"

Single by Pat Boone

from the album Pat's Great Hits
- B-side: "I'm in Love with You"
- Released: May 8, 1956
- Recorded: 1956
- Genre: Pop
- Length: 2:27
- Label: Dot
- Composer: Ivory Joe Hunter

Pat Boone singles chronology
"Long Tall Sally" / "Just as Long as I'm with You" (1956)	"I Almost Lost My Mind" (1956)	"I'm in Love with You" (1956)

"I Almost Lost My Mind" is a popular song written by Ivory Joe Hunter and published in 1950. Hunter's recording of the song was a number one hit on the US Billboard R&B singles chart in that year.

Hunter recorded the 12-bar blues style song on October 1, 1949, and became a rhythm and blues hit and a pop standard. Hunter's record sold one million copies by 1956. The best selling version of the song was a cover version by Pat Boone, which reached number one on the Billboard charts in 1956. It has since been recorded by a variety of pop artists, big bands, country and western stars, rock and rollers, and Latin, jazz and blues performers.

== See also ==
- List of number-one R&B singles of 1950 (U.S.)
- List of number-one singles of 1956 (U.S.)
