= (The) Rock and Roll Waltz =

Single by Kay Starr
- B-side: "I've Changed My Mind a Thousand Times"
- Released: December 1955
- Recorded: 1955
- Genre: Vocal Music
- Label: RCA Victor
- Songwriter(s): Shorty Allen, Roy Alfred

Kay Starr singles chronology
"Good and Lonesome" (1955)	"(The) Rock and Roll Waltz" (1955)	"Second Fiddle" (1956)

"(The) Rock and Roll Waltz" is a popular song with music by Shorty Allen and lyrics by Roy Alfred in 1955, although the original copyright assigned the lyrics to Alfred's mother, Jeanne, under the pseudonym 'Dick Ware'.

As the title suggests, this novelty song is a waltz in triple metre, but it also contains a bass riff that is reminiscent of typical boogie woogie and rock and roll riffs.

The song is told from the point of view of a teenager who comes home early from a date, and catches her parents attempting to dance to one of her rock and roll records; only, having no frame of reference, the couple tries to waltz to the music.

The Kay Starr recording of the song, made in 1955, reached number one on the Billboard singles chart in 1956, staying there for six weeks. The recording was released by RCA Victor as catalog number 47-6359. It was Kay Starr's first recording of great significance for RCA Victor after leaving Capitol Records. She had a number of lesser chart entries on RCA Victor in 1955, including "Good and Lonesome" and "Turn Right". At first, she thought it was a joke when the A&R staff at RCA Victor brought it to her, it was a marked departure from what she usually recorded. The song turned out to be a number one hit, a million seller, and one of the early songs of the rock and roll era.

The track also spent one week at No. 1 in the UK Singles Chart in March 1956.

Other artists who recorded this song include Ann-Margret (in 1962), Annette Funicello (in 1961), Lawrence Welk and His Champagne Music with Alice Lon on vocals (in 1956, Coral EC 81128), and George Wright in his 1984 album Red Hot and Blue.

== See also ==
- List of number-one singles in Australia during the 1950s
- List of number-one singles from the 1950s (UK)
- List of number-one singles of 1956 (U.S.)
