= Hot Diggity (Dog Ziggity Boom) =

Single by Perry Como
- B-side: "Juke Box Baby"
- Released: February 1956
- Recorded: February 2, 1956
- Genre: Pop
- Length: 2:21
- Label: RCA Victor
- Composer(s): Emmanuel Chabrier; Al Hoffman; Dick Manning
- Lyricist(s): Al Hoffman; Dick Manning

Perry Como singles chronology
"(There's No Place Like) Home for the Holidays" (1955)	"Hot Diggity (Dog Ziggity Boom)" (1956)	"More" (1956)

"Hot Diggity (Dog Ziggity Boom)" is an American popular song written by Al Hoffman and Dick Manning, and published in 1956. The melody and triple-time rhythm are almost identical to a portion of Emmanuel Chabrier's 1883 composition, España. The song was recorded by Perry Como.

== Background ==
Perry Como recorded "Hot Diggity" at Webster Hall in New York City. The conductor was Mitchell Ayres and the producer was Joe Carlton. The back-up vocals were provided by the Ray Charles Singers.

The song's title, repeated throughout the song, is "a general excl[amation] of pleasure or surprise". It is used as counterpoint to the lines it precedes in the lyrics, as in the following excerpt:

"Hot diggity, dog ziggity, boom
What you do to me,
When you're holding me tight."

At the end of the song, Como exclaimed "Hot dog!" before the last two chords.

The phrase "hot diggity" or "hot diggity dog!" dates to at least 1906. It appeared in a popular song in 1928, when Al Jolson was recorded saying "Hot diggity dog! Hot kitty! Hot pussycat! Didn't I tell you you'd love it?" after a performance of the tune "There's a Rainbow 'Round My Shoulder".

== Chart performance ==
The Perry Como recording went to #1 on the Billboard pop music chart in March 1956, and reached #4 on the British charts in May.

== In popular culture ==
- The song is briefly heard in the extended DVD cut of the Family Guy episode "Airport '07", during "Peter Griffin's Champagne Dance Party" (a parody of The Lawrence Welk Show).
- It is also briefly heard in Call the Midwife, Series 1 Episode 6, set in late 1957.
- In the sixth episode of the first season of Doom Patrol, the main antagonist of the series, Mr. Nobody, is shown to have orchestrated a plan in the 1950s which involved a giant balloon shaped like buttocks and playing the song on an attached jukebox repeatedly, sending people insane within 20 minutes.
- In the late 1970s a version with revised lyrics was used as a TV jingle for Oscar Mayer.
- From the mid 1980s and late 1990s to 2000, the song was used in Wendy's and McDonald's advertising campaigns in Canada and the UK to promote their new range of hot dogs.
- The song was used in the launch trailer of the 2020 multiplayer video game, Fall Guys: Ultimate Knockout.
