= George Cates =

American musical artist

Background information
- Born: October 19, 1911; New York City, New York, U.S.
- Died: May 10, 2002 (aged 90) Santa Monica, California
- Occupations: Composer, arranger, conductor
- Instrument: Saxophone
- Label: Coral Records

George Cates (October 19, 1911 – May 10, 2002) was an American music arranger, conductor, songwriter and record executive known for his work with Lawrence Welk and his orchestra.

== Biography ==
Born and raised in New York City, New York, United States, Cates began his music career shortly after graduating from New York University, where he found work with the vaudeville team of Olsen and Johnson on their revue, Hellzapoppin. His early career included arranging and playing saxophone with such bands as Henry Busse, Dick Stabile, and Russ Morgan between 1945 and 1951. In the mid-1950s, he was A&R director for Coral Records, writing and conducting for the label's stars that included the Andrews Sisters, Teresa Brewer, Bing Crosby, and Danny Kaye. During this time (1956), he hit the Top 40 charts (No. 31) with his release of a medley of "Moonglow" and "Theme from Picnic." The record "Moonglow and Theme from Picnic" had some wordless vocal effects by Norma Zimmer, at the time a session vocalist, who, coincidentally, would later become Lawrence Welk's Champagne Lady. "Moonglow and Theme from Picnic" sold over one million copies, and was awarded a gold disc.

Starting in 1951, he served as Lawrence Welk's musical director. In that role, he conducted the orchestra in the rehearsals and spent many years behind the scenes as an arranger. After leaving the ABC television network in 1971, Welk syndicated his show and continued on TV using the theme song "Champagne Fanfare," which Cates had composed. A prolific writer, Cates' songs were sung by many of the show's "Musical Family" members. In 1973, the Maestro asked him to conduct the orchestra on-camera, a role he carried until the show ended in 1982. Notably, he presented occasional classical music selections in addition to the band's lighter fare. In addition to his work with Welk, Cates wrote and arranged several albums with other prominent bandleaders of the era. One of his albums, Polynesian Percussion, featured some instrumental work by his brother-in-law guitarist Alvino Rey, Buddy Cole playing a console steel guitar, and Novachord, as well as another fifteen-plus odd percussion instruments producing some unique sounds.

Cates died of heart failure at his home in Santa Monica, California, at the age of 90.

== Selected discography ==
=== Albums ===
As George Cates and as George Cates and His Orchestra:

- Main Title (Coral, 1957) (half of LP's program performed by Dick Jacobs)
- Movie Moods (Coral, 1957)
- Under European Skies (Coral, 1957)
- Polynesian Percussion (Coral, 1961)
- Take Five (Dot], ca. 1962)
- Twistin' Twelve Great Hits! (Dot, 1962)
- Third Man Theme (Dot, ca. 1963)
- Hit Songs - Hit Sounds (Dot, 1964) featuring Neil LeVang
- 1965's Great Hits (Hamilton Records, 1966)
- Great Hit Sounds Of George Cates (Hamilton, ca. 1966)

=== Singles ===
- "Moonglow Introducing Theme from Picnic"
