= The Poor People of Paris =

1956 US pop instrumental hit song

"The Poor People of Paris" is a US pop song that became a number-one instrumental hit in 1956. It is based on the French language song "La goualante du pauvre Jean" ("The Ballad of Poor John"), with music by Marguerite Monnot and words by René Rouzaud. Edith Piaf had one of her biggest hits with the original French version.

The song was adapted in 1954 by American songwriter Jack Lawrence, who wrote English lyrics that are considerably different from the original French ones. The English language title arises in part from a misinterpretation of the French title, as "pauvre Jean" was taken for the same-sounding "pauvres gens", which translates as "poor people."

Lawrence's lyrics, which pronounce "Paris" as "Paree" in the French style, are seldom heard, as most of the popular recordings of the song in the English-speaking world have been instrumentals.

== Les Baxter version ==
"The Poor People of Paris"
- "The Poor People of Paris" by Les Baxter & His Orchestra on Capitol 3336

Single by Les Baxter & His Orchestra
- B-side: Theme from "Helen of Troy"
- Released: 1956
- Recorded: 1955
- Genre: Easy listening
- Length: 2:24
- Label: Capitol
- Songwriter: Marguerite Monnot

Les Baxter & His Orchestra singles chronology
"Foreign Intrigue" (1956)	"The Poor People of Paris" (1956)	"Tango of the Drums" (1956)

A recording of the tune by Les Baxter's orchestra (Capitol Records catalog number 3336, with the flip side "Theme from 'Helen of Troy'") was a number-one hit on the Billboard charts in the US in 1956: for four weeks on the Best Sellers in Stores chart, for six weeks on the Most Played by Jockeys and Top 100 charts, and for three weeks on the Most Played on Jukeboxes chart. This recording was also released in Australia by Capitol under catalog number CP-1044. This version of the song was also the last song to reach number one (in the US) before Elvis Presley's "Heartbreak Hotel" topped the chart.

Baxter's version featured strings, brass, a wordless chorus, tinkling percussion, finger snapping, and a group of whistlers.

== Winifred Atwell version ==
In the same year, the piano version by Winifred Atwell (Decca Records catalog number F10681) was number one in the UK Singles Chart for three weeks. In Australia, it was released as Decca Catalogue number Y 6783.

== Other versions ==
- Cover versions by Lawrence Welk, Russ Morgan (Decca Records catalog number 29835, with the flip side "Annabelle") and Chet Atkins appeared in the US Top 100.
- A 1955 version of Eddie Cochran was released in 1997 on the album Rockin' It Country Style.
- In 1956, Mexican trio Los Tres Diamantes covered the song in Spanish with the title "Pobre gente de París".
- Dean Martin recorded the song with the Lawrence lyrics for his 1962 album French Style.
- Bing Crosby and Rosemary Clooney recorded a version containing the seldom-heard Lawrence lyrics for their 1965 album That Travelin' Two-Beat.
- Lenny Dee recorded an instrumental version in his 1965 album "The Lenny Dee Tour" (Decca DL 74654).
- Billy May also recorded a Latin-styled version that appears in the Ultra-Lounge CD Volume 10: A Bachelor in Paris, that was edited together with Les Baxter's version.
- In 1991, Episode 6 of Series 2 of Vic Reeves Big Night Out featured a version of the song with completely new lyrics detailing The Man With The Stick's holiday.
- Reginald Dixon released a version of the song as part of a medley with the songs "Willie Can" and "The Happy Whistler" on his 2009 compilation album Reginald Dixon at the Organ.
