= Morris Stoloff =

American composer (1898–1980)

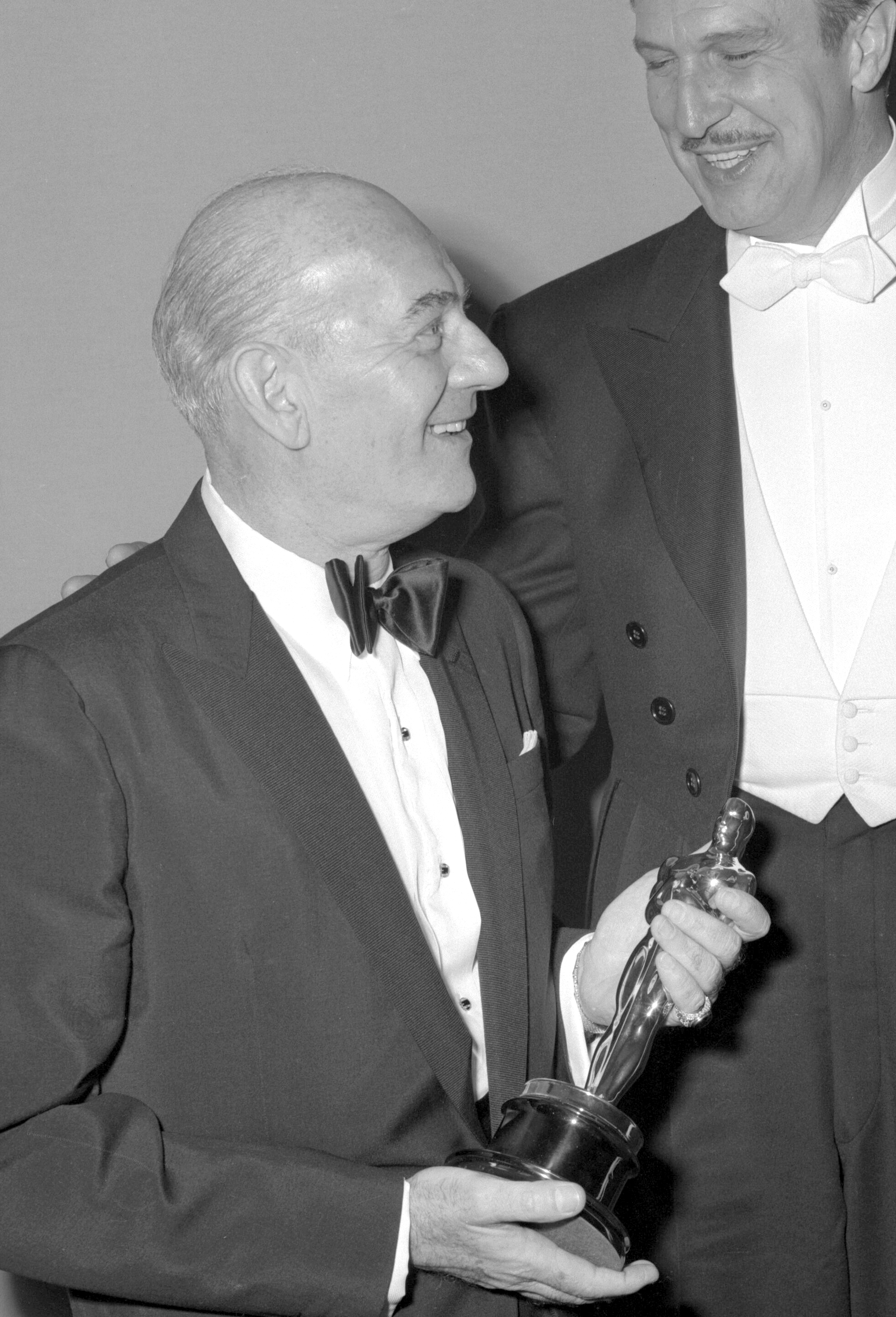
Stoloff (left) with Vincent Price at the 30th Academy Awards (1958)

Morris W. Stoloff (August 1, 1898 – April 16, 1980) was an American composer. He worked with Sammy Davis Jr., Dinah Shore, Al Jolson and Frank Sinatra.

== Life and career ==
Stoloff was born in Philadelphia, Pennsylvania, on August 1, 1898. A child prodigy on the violin, Stoloff was taken under the wing of W. A. Clark. After studying with Leopold Auer for several years, Stoloff was touring the U.S. as a featured soloist at the age of 16 and joined the Los Angeles Philharmonic a year later as its youngest member ever.

When sound came to motion pictures, studios came looking for musicians to provide it, and Stoloff was one of the first to cross over from classical music to movies. He was the first concertmaster on Paramount Pictures' payroll, and he worked with setting up the mechanics of a system that had to provide a steady stream of music for everything from epic dramas to serials and comedy shorts.

In 1936, Stoloff moved over to Columbia Pictures, where he took the title of music director, a new position unique to the studio system. As music director, he was the chief executive responsible for providing musical production support to every film the studio released. This meant matching up composers, orchestrators, conductors, musicians, and recording facilities to meet the creative scope of each project as well as its schedule and budget.

Stoloff often took partial credit for a picture's score when he worked closely with a particular composer to work out a theme, motifs, and melodies. As a result, he ranks among some of the most-nominated individuals in the history of the Academy Awards. He won three Oscars for best scores, including those for Cover Girl (1944), The Jolson Story (1946), and Song Without End (1960), and was nominated 14 other times.

By the late 1940s, film music was beginning to be recognized on its own, and Stoloff began recording some of the more popular numbers as singles for Decca Records. When long-play albums were perfected, the studios saw the opportunity to market more than just singles to the listening audience, and soundtrack albums became hot commodities. Stoloff exercised his privilege as musical director to record these soundtrack albums himself, working with material from the actual scores.

When Frank Sinatra founded Reprise Records in the early 1960s, he hired Stoloff as musical director; the two having worked successfully before on Pal Joey (1957). One of Stoloff's most noteworthy achievements while at Reprise was the release of a set of re-recordings of great Broadway musicals, including Kiss Me, Kate with a studio cast.

Stoloff worked as musical director at Columbia Pictures from 1936 to 1962. Among space age pop fans, he is best remembered for his 1956 Top 10 hit that paired the swing era tune "Moonglow" with the love theme from the movie Picnic, the medley called Moonglow and Theme from Picnic; Moonglow (Hudson, Mills), Picnic (Duning). It sold over one million copies and was awarded a gold disc by the RIAA.

Stoloff died in 1980 in Los Angeles, California, aged 81.

== Recordings ==
- "Picnic", Decca DL-78320
- "Love Sequence", Decca DL-8407
- "This is Kim" (as Jeanne Eagels), Decca DL-8574
- "You Made Me Love You", Decca DL-9034
- "Rock-a-bye Your Baby", Decca DL-9035
- "You Ain't Heard Nothin' Yet", Decca DL-9037
- "Fanny", Warner Brothers WBS-1416
- "1001 Arabian Nights", Colpix SCP-410
- "Song Without End", Colpix SC-506
- "Finian's Rainbow", Reprise FS-2015
- "Miss Sadie Thompson", Mercury MG-25181
