= Music history of the United States in the 1950s =

In the 1950s, the United States saw the rise of teen culture and rock 'n roll, while jazz clubs and ballads were also popular. Many musical styles flourished and combined in the 1940s and 1950s, most likely because of the influence the radio had in creating a mass market for music. World War II caused great social upheaval, and the music of this period shows the effects of that upheaval.

== Classic pop ==
Popular music, or "classic pop," dominated the charts for the first half of the 1950s. Vocal-driven classic pop replaced Big Band/Swing at the end of World War II, although it often used orchestras to back the vocalists. 1940s style Crooners vied with a new generation of big voiced singers, many drawing on Italian bel canto traditions. Mitch Miller, A&R man at the era's most successful label, Columbia Records, set the tone for the development of popular music well into the middle of decade. Miller integrated country, Western, rhythm & blues, and folk music into the musical mainstream, by having many of his label's biggest artists record them in a style that corresponded to Pop traditions. Miller often employed novel and ear-catching arrangements featuring classical instruments (whooping french horns, harpsichord), or sound effects (whip cracks). He approached each record as a miniature story, often "casting" the vocalist according to type.

(Mitch) Miller and the producers who followed his model were creating a new sort of pop record. Instead of capturing the sound of live groups, they were making three-minute musicals, matching singers to songs in the same way that movie producers matched stars to film roles. As Miller told 'Time' magazine in 1951, 'Every singer has certain sounds he makes better than others. Frankie Laine is sweat and hard words - he's a guy beating the pillow, a purveyor of basic emotions. Guy Mitchell is better with happy-go-lucky songs; he's a virile young singer, gives people a vicarious lift. Rosemary Clooney is a barrelhouse dame, a hillbilly at heart.' It was a way of thinking perfectly suited to the new market in which vocalists were creating unique identities and hit songs were performed as television skits.

Whereas Big Band/Swing music placed the primary emphasis on the orchestration, post-war/early 1950s era Pop focused on the song's story and/or the emotion being expressed. By the early 1950s, emotional delivery had reached its apex in the miniature psycho-drama songs of writer-singer Johnnie Ray. Known as 'The Cry Guy' and 'The Prince of Wails,' Ray's on-stage emotion wrought 'breakdowns' provided a release for the pent-up angst of his predominantly teenaged fans. As Ray described it, "I make them feel, I exhaust them, I destroy them.' It was during this period that the fan hysteria, which began with Frank Sinatra during the Second World War, really began to take hold.

Although often ignored by musical historians, Pop music played a significant role in the development of Rock 'n' Roll as well:

[Mitch] Miller also conceived of the idea of the pop record 'sound' per se: not so much an arrangement or a tune, but an aural texture (usually replete with extramusical gimmicks) that could be created in the studio and then replicated in live performance, instead of the other way around. Miller was hardly a rock 'n' roller, yet without these ideas there could never have been rock 'n' roll. 'Mule Train', Miller's first major hit (for Frankie Laine) and the foundation of his career, set the pattern for virtually the entire first decade of rock. The similarities between it and, say, 'Leader of the Pack,' need hardly be outlined here.

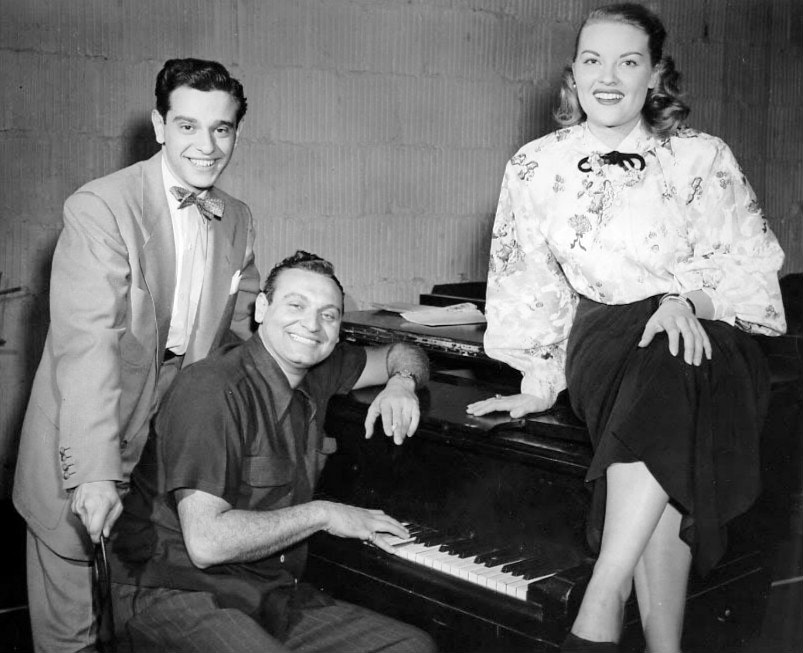
Frankie Laine (at piano) and Patti Page, circa 1950.

Patti Page kicked things off with what would become the decade's biggest hit, "Tennessee Waltz." Her other hits from this period included: "Mister and Mississippi," "Mockin' Bird Hill," "Detour," "(How Much Is That) Doggie in the Window," and "Old Cape Cod." Frankie Laine's 1949 hits, "That Lucky Old Sun (Just Rolls Around Heaven All Day)" and "Mule Train," were still riding high on the charts when the decade began. He continued to score with such hits as: "Georgia On My Mind," "Cry of the Wild Goose," "Jezebel," "Rose, Rose, I Love You," "Jealousy (Jalousie)," "High Noon (Do Not Forsake Me)," "I Believe," "Granada," "Moonlight Gambler," and "Rawhide." Johnnie Ray had a long run of hits in the early half of the decade, often backed by The Four Lads, including: "Cry," "The Little White Cloud That Cried," "Walking My Baby Back Home," "Please, Mr. Sun," and "Just Walkin' in the Rain." The Four Lads racked up some hits on their own with "Who Needs You," "No, Not Much," "Standin' on the Corner," and "Moments to Remember." Nat "King" Cole dominated the charts throughout the decade with such timeless classics as "Unforgettable," "Mona Lisa," "Too Young," "Darling, Je Vous Aime Beaucoup," "Pretend," "Smile," and "A Blossom Fell." Perry Como was another frequent visitor to the charts with hits like: "If," "Round and Round," "Don't Let the Stars Get in Your Eyes," "Tina Marie," "Papa Loves Mambo," and "Catch a Falling Star."

Other major stars in the early 1950s included Frank Sinatra ("Young at Heart," "Three Coins in the Fountain," "Witchcraft"), Tony Bennett ("Cold, Cold Heart," "Because of You," "Rags to Riches"), Kay Starr ("Bonaparte's Retreat," "Wheel of Fortune," "Rock and Roll Waltz"), Rosemary Clooney ("Come On-a My House," "Mambo Italiano," "Half as Much," "This Ole House"), Dean Martin ("That's Amore," "Return to Me," "Sway"), Georgia Gibbs ("Kiss of Fire," "Dance With Me, Henry," "Tweedle Dee"), Eddie Fisher ("Anytime," "Wish You Were Here," "Thinking of You," "I'm Walking Behind You," "Oh! My Pa-Pa," "Fanny"), Teresa Brewer ("Music! Music! Music!," "Till I Waltz Again With You," "Ricochet (Rick-O-Shay)"), Doris Day ("Secret Love," "Whatever Will Be Will Be (Que Sera Sera)," "Teacher's Pet"), Guy Mitchell ("My Heart Cries for You," "The Roving Kind," "Pittsburgh, Pennsylvania," "Singing the Blues"), Bing Crosby ("Play a Simple Melody with son Gary Crosby, "True Love with Grace Kelly), Dinah Shore ("Lavender Blue"), Kitty Kallen ("Little Things Mean a Lot"), Joni James ("Have You Heard," "Wishing Ring," "Your Cheatin' Heart"), Peggy Lee ("Lover," "Fever"), Julie London ("Cry Me a River"), Toni Arden ("Padre"), June Valli ("Why Don't You Believe Me"), Arthur Godfrey ("Slowpoke"), Tennessee Ernie Ford ("Sixteen Tons"), Les Paul and Mary Ford ("Vaya Con Dios," "Tiger Rag"), and vocal groups like The Mills Brothers ("Glow Worm"), The Weavers "(Goodnight Irene"), The Four Aces ("Love Is a Many-Splendored Thing", "(It's No) Sin"), The Chordettes ("Mister Sandman"), Fontane Sisters ("Hearts of Stone"), The Hilltoppers ("Trying," "P.S. I Love You"), The McGuire Sisters ("Sincerely," "Goodnite, Sweetheart, Goodnite," "Sugartime") and The Ames Brothers ("Ragmop", "The Naughty Lady of Shady Lane").

Classic pop declined in popularity as rock and roll entered the mainstream and became a major force in American record sales. Crooners such as Eddie Fisher, Perry Como, and Patti Page, who had dominated the first half of the decade, found their access to the pop charts significantly curtailed by the decade's end. However, new Pop vocalists continued to rise to prominence throughout the decade, many of whom started out singing Rock 'n' Roll. These include: Pat Boone ("Don't Forbid Me," "April Love," "Love Letters in the Sand"), Connie Francis ("Who's Sorry Now," "Among My Souvenirs," "My Happiness"), Gogi Grant ("Suddenly There's a Valley," "The Wayward Wind"), Bobby Darin ("Dream Lover," "Beyond the Sea," "Mack the Knife"), and Andy Williams ("Canadian Sunset," "Butterfly," "Hawaiian Wedding Song"). Even Rock 'n' Roll icon Elvis Presley spent the rest of his career alternating between Pop and Rock ("Love Me Tender," "Loving You," "I Love You Because"). Pop would resurface on the charts in the mid-1960s as "Adult Contemporary."

== Rock and roll ==
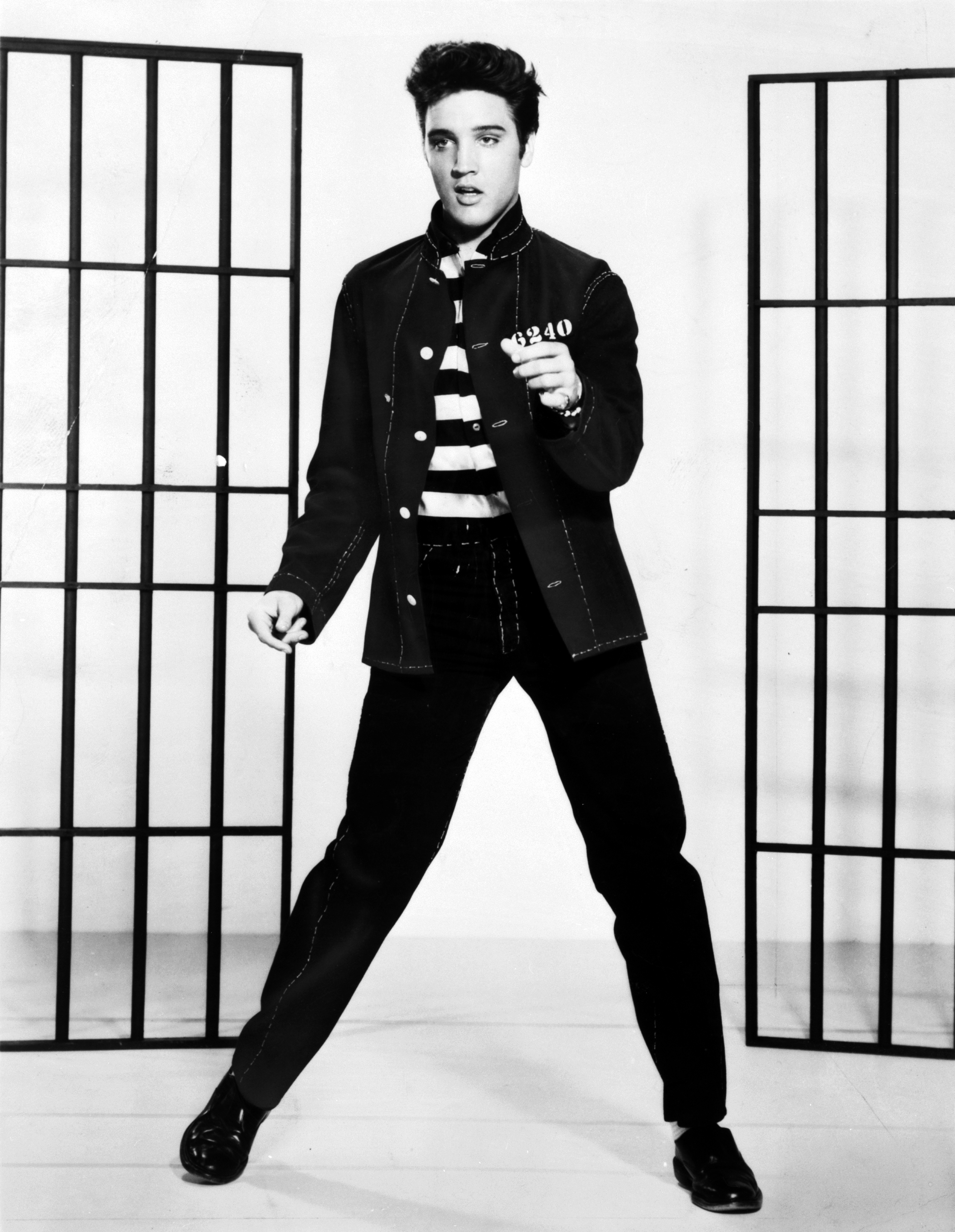
Elvis Presley, 1957

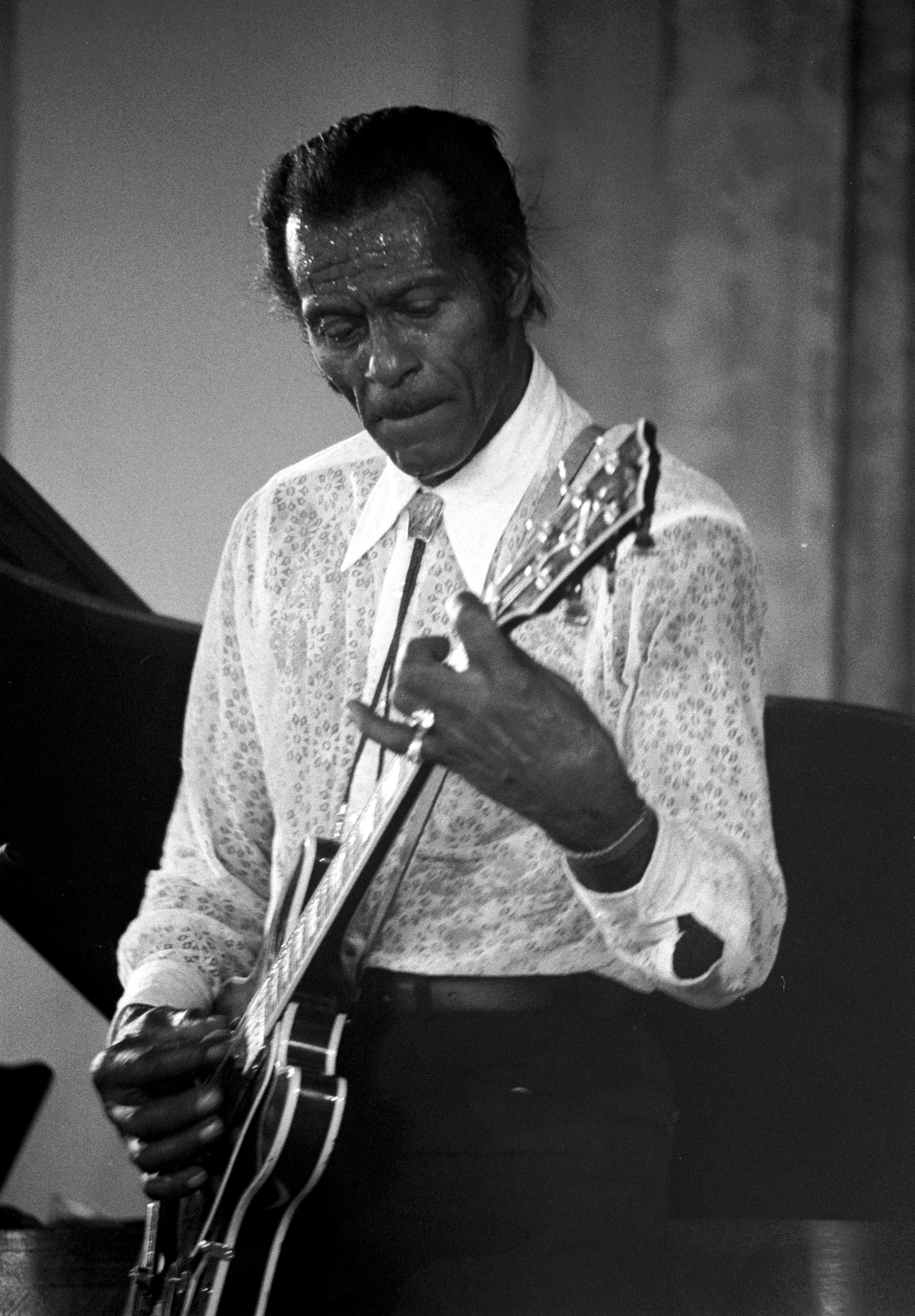
Chuck Berry

Rock and roll dominated popular music in the latter half of the 1950s. The musical style originated and evolved in the United States during the late 1940s and early 1950s, and quickly spread to much of the rest of the world. Its immediate origins lay in a mixing together of various black musical genres of the time, including rhythm and blues and gospel music; with country and western and Pop. In 1951, Cleveland, Ohio disc jockey Alan Freed began playing rhythm and blues music for a multi-racial audience, and is credited with first using the phrase "rock and roll" to describe the music, though the terms "rocking" and "rolling" were being used in boogie-woogie and religious music for decades before that.

The 1950s saw the growth in popularity of the electric guitar (developed and popularized by Les Paul). Paul's hit records like "How High the Moon," and "The World Is Waiting for the Sunrise," helped lead to the development of a specifically rock and roll style of playing of such exponents as Chuck Berry, Link Wray, and Scotty Moore. Chuck Berry, who is considered to be one of the pioneers of Rock and roll music, refined and developed the major elements that made rock and roll distinctive, focusing on teen life and introducing guitar solos and showmanship that would be a major influence on subsequent rock music.

Artists such as Chuck Berry, Bo Diddley, Fats Domino, Little Richard, Jerry Lee Lewis, Big Joe Turner, and Gene Vincent released the initial rhythm and blues-influenced early rock and roll hits. Rock and roll forerunners in the popular music field included Johnnie Ray, The Crew-Cuts, The Fontane Sisters, and Les Paul and Mary Ford. The Rock and Roll Era is generally dated from the March 25, 1955 premiere of the motion picture, "The Blackboard Jungle." This film's use of Bill Haley and His Comets' "(We're Gonna) Rock Around the Clock" over its opening credits, caused a national sensation when teenagers started dancing in the aisles.

Pat Boone became the first rock and roll teen idol in 1955 with heavily Pop-influenced "covers" of R&B hits like "Two Hearts, Two Kisses (Make One Love)," "Ain't That a Shame", and "At My Front Door (Crazy Little Mama)." Boone's traditional approach to rock and roll, coupled with his All-American, clean-cut image helped bring the new sound to a much wider audience. Elvis Presley, who began his career in the mid-1950s, soon became the leading figure of the newly popular sound of rock and roll with a series of network television appearances, motion pictures, and chart-topping records. His energized interpretations of songs, many from African American sources, and his uninhibited performance style made him enormously popular—and controversial during that period. Boone and Presley's styles/images represented opposite ends of the burgeoning musical form, which competed with one another throughout the remainder of the decade.

In 1957, a popular television show featuring rock and roll performers, American Bandstand, went national. Hosted by Dick Clark, the program helped to popularize the more clean-cut, All-American brand of rock and roll. By the end of the decade, teen idols like Bobby Darin, Ricky Nelson, Frankie Avalon, Paul Anka, Neil Sedaka, Bobby Rydell, Connie Francis, and Fabian Forte were topping the charts. Some commentators have perceived this as the decline of rock and roll; citing the deaths of Buddy Holly, The Big Bopper and Ritchie Valens in a tragic plane crash in 1959 and the departure of Elvis for the army as causes.

On the other side of the spectrum, R&B-influenced acts like The Crows, The Penguins, The El Dorados and The Turbans all scored major hits, and groups like The Platters, with songs including "The Great Pretender" (1955), and The Coasters with humorous songs like "Yakety Yak" (1958), ranked among the most successful rock and roll acts of the period.

Rock and roll has also been seen as leading to a number of distinct subgenres, including rockabilly (see below) in the 1950s, combining rock and roll with "hillbilly" country music, which was usually played and recorded in the mid-1950s by white singers such as Carl Perkins, Jerry Lee Lewis, Buddy Holly and with the greatest commercial success, Elvis Presley. Another subgenre, Doo Wop, entered the pop charts in the 1950s . Its popularity soon spawns the parody "Who Put the Bomp (in the Bomp, Bomp, Bomp)."

Novelty songs, long a music industry staple, continued their popularity in the Rock and Roll medium with hits such as "Beep Beep."

== Bluegrass ==
In the late 1930s, Bill Monroe formed the Blue Grass Boys (named after his native state of Kentucky, the blue grass state) and combined diverse influences into Appalachian folk music. These include Scottish, Poland and Southeastern Europe and folk, as well as doo wop, country and gospel. Monroe became the father of bluegrass music, and his band was a training ground for most of bluegrass' future stars, especially Lester Flatt and Earl Scruggs. Flatt and Scruggs popularized bluegrass as part of the Foggy Mountain Boys, which they formed in 1948. Though bluegrass has never quite achieved mainstream status, it did become well known through its use in several recorded plays, including the T.V. theme song for Beverly Hillbillies and the movies Bonnie and Clyde and Deliverance. In the 1950s, bluegrass artists included Stanley Brothers, Osborne Brothers and Jimmy Martin's Sunny Mountain Boys.

== Country music ==
The 1950s also saw the popular dominance of the Nashville sound in country music. Country's Nashville sound was slick and soulful, and a movement of rough honky tonk developed in a reaction against the mainstream orientation of Nashville. This movement was centered in Bakersfield, California with musicians like Buck Owens ("Act Naturally"), Merle Haggard ("Sing a Sad Song") and Wynn Stewart ("It's Such a Pretty World Today") helping to define the sound among the community, made up primarily of Oklahoman immigrants to California, who had fled unemployment and drought.

== Folk music ==
The late 1940s and the early 1950s saw the beginning of popular folk music with groups like The Weavers. The Kingston Trio, Pete Seeger, Woody Guthrie, Odetta, and several other performers were instrumental in launching the folk music revival of the 1950s and 1960s.

== Roots revival ==
By the late 1950s, a revival of Appalachian folk music was taking place across the country, and bands like The Weavers were paving the way for future mainstream stars like Bob Dylan and Joan Baez. Bluegrass was similarly revitalized and updated by artists including Tony Rice, Clarence White, Richard Green, Bill Keith and David Grisman. The Dillards, however, were the ones to break bluegrass into mainstream markets in the early 1960s.

== Gospel ==
Following World War II, gospel began its golden age. Artists like the Five Blind Boys of Mississippi, The Swan Silvertones, Clara Ward Singers and Sensational Nightingales became stars across the country; other early artists like Sam Cooke, Dionne Warwick, Dinah Washington, Johnnie Taylor, Aretha Franklin, Wilson Pickett began their career in gospel quartets during this period, only to achieve even greater fame in the 1960s as the pioneers of soul music, itself a secularized, R&B-influenced form of gospel. Mahalia Jackson and The Staple Singers were undoubtedly the most successful of the golden age gospel artists.

== Doo wop ==
In addition, doo wop achieved widespread popularity in the 1950s. Doo wop was a harmonically complex style of choral singing that developed in the streets of major cities like Chicago, New York City, and, most importantly, Baltimore. Doo wop singers would work a cappella without backing instruments, and practice in hallways of their schools, apartment buildings, or alleys to achieve echo effects on their voices, and lyrics were generally innocent youthful observations on the upsides of teen love and romance. Groups like The Crows ("Gee"), The Orioles ("It's Too Soon to Know") and Brooklyn's Frankie Lymon & the Teenagers ("Why Do Fools Fall in Love") had a string of hit songs that brought the genre to chart domination by 1958 (see 1958 in music).

== Latin music ==
Cuban mambo, cha-cha-chá and charanga bands enjoyed brief periods of popularity, and helped establish a viable Latin-American music industry, which led the way to the invention of salsa music among Cubans and Puerto Ricans in New York City in the 1970s. The 1950s also saw success for Mexican ranchera divas, while a Mexican-American mariachi scene was developing on the West Coast, and Puerto Rican plena, Brazilian bossa nova and other Latin genres became popular.

Mexican-Texans had been playing conjunto music for decades by the end of World War 2, female duos created the first popular style of Mexican-American music, norteña. Mexican romantic ballads called bolero were also popular, especially singers like the Queen of the Bolero, Chelo Silva. In the mid-1950s, when Mexican ranchera was used in Hollywood film soundtracks and the upper-class enjoyed stately orquestas Tejanas and conjunto evolved into a distinctively Mexican-American genre called Tejano. Artists of this era include Esteban Jordan, Tony de la Rosa and El Conjunto Bernal.

== Cajun and Creole music ==
The 1940s saw a return to the roots of Cajun music, led by Iry LeJeune, Nathan Abshire and other artists, alongside musicians who incorporated rock and roll, including Laurence Walker and Aldus Roger. In the late 1940s, Clifton Chenier, a Creole, began playing an updated form of la la called zydeco. Zydeco was briefly popular among some mainstream listeners during the 1950s. Artists like Boozoo Chavis, Queen Ida, Rockin' Dopsie and Rockin' Sidney have continued to bring zydeco to national audiences in the following decades. Zydeco shows major influences from rock, and artists like Beau Jocque have combined other influences, including hip hop.

== See also ==
- 1950s in music
- American music during World War II
- Essential American Recordings Survey
- List of musicians of the 1950s
