= It's Not for Me to Say =

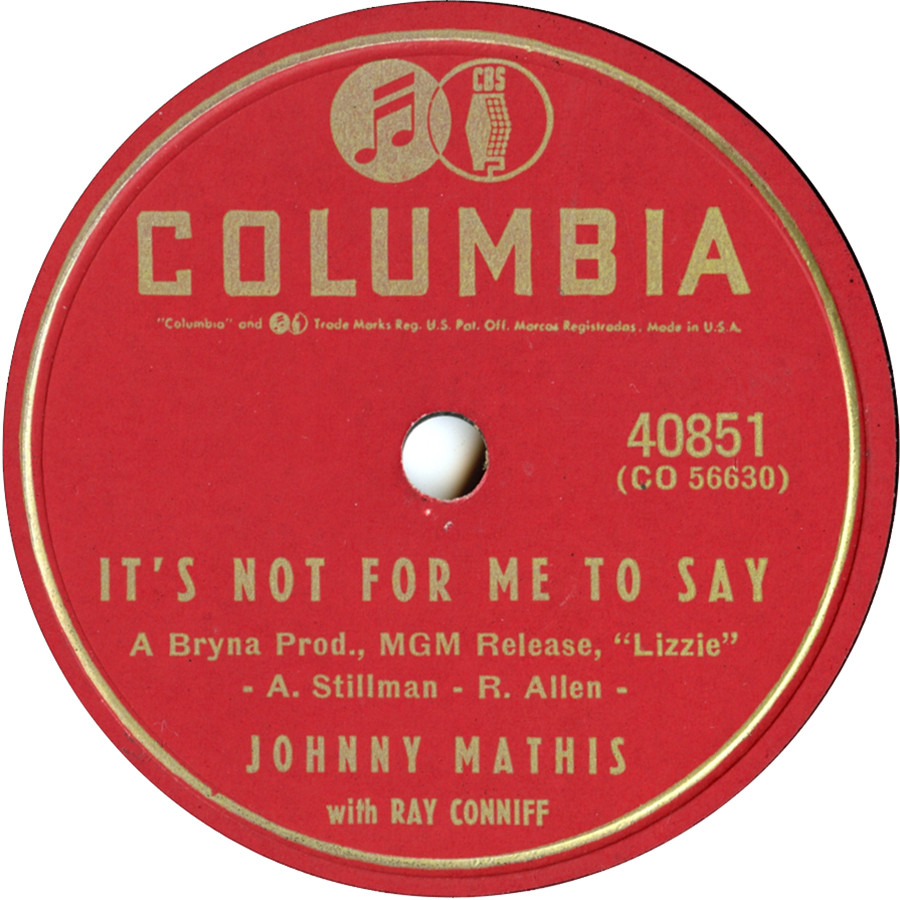

Single by Johnny Mathis and Ray Conniff and his Orchestra

from the album Johnny's Greatest Hits
- B-side: "Warm and Tender"
- Released: February 25, 1957
- Recorded: September 21, 1956
- Studio: Columbia 30th Street Studio, New York City
- Genre: Pop
- Length: 3:01
- Label: Columbia
- Songwriters: Robert Allen, Al Stillman
- Producers: Al Ham; Mitch Miller

Johnny Mathis singles chronology
"Wonderful! Wonderful!" (1956)	"It's Not for Me to Say" (1957)	"Chances Are" / "The Twelfth of Never" (1957)

Music video
- "It's Not for Me to Say" on YouTube

"It's Not for Me to Say" is a 1957 popular song with music by Robert Allen and lyrics by Al Stillman. American singer Johnny Mathis recorded the song and later performed it in the 1957 movie Lizzie. His recording reached the top 10 on the US pop charts.

== Background, release and commercial performance ==
Johnny Mathis was billed as a jazz singer on his debut album, which was released by Columbia Records in 1956. In the liner notes for his 1993 box set The Music of Johnny Mathis: A Personal Collection, Mathis is quoted as saying that the head of A&R at Columbia, Mitch Miller, "hated what I was singing, and he hated the way I was singing it." Miller wanted to teach him to sing using the "choirboy quality in his voice". Miller had produced the hits "No, Not Much" and "Who Needs You?" for The Four Lads, both of which were written by Bob Allen. Mathis met Allen and asked if he would write something for him. The song Allen wrote, "It's Not for Me to Say", was included in a stack of demos and sheet music Miller gave Mathis from which he was to select four songs for a recording session on September 21, 1956, with Miller and Al Ham producing. (Note: Neither the original 45 and 78 rpm singles nor the liner notes for Johnny's Greatest Hits provided producer credits, but other compilations have. The Essential Johnny Mathis, Gold: A 50th Anniversary Celebration and The Singles acknowledge Mitch Miller as a producer, but The Essential Johnny Mathis and Gold: A 50th Anniversary Celebration also credit Al Ham as a producer on this song.) The liner notes also quote him as saying, "The fact that I was going to do Allen's song was a given because he was Mitch's friend. The other three songs were to fill out the [standard 3-hour] recording session." Miller hired arranger Ray Conniff, who was enthusiastic about the project, but Mathis explained, "There was almost no budget allotted for my music in those days. There were no more than eight musicians on those recordings."

The November 3, 1956, issue of Billboard magazine reported that Mathis would be appearing in an American film noir drama film from MGM Studios titled Lizzie and starring Eleanor Parker. He would be performing two songs in the film, "It's Not for Me to Say" and another selection from the September session, "Warm and Tender". He had the role of a piano player, and Columbia Records promoted the fact that he played his own piano accompaniment both in the film version and on the studio recording of "It's Not for Me to Say".

The other two songs from the September recording session, "Wonderful! Wonderful!" and "When Sunny Gets Blue", were released as his first single on November 5. The two songs from Lizzie were released as a single on February 25, 1957, eighteen days before the film's release on March 15. Billboard theorized that it was the success of "It's Not for Me to Say" that propelled "Wonderful! Wonderful!" to the chart positions it reached. (Note: "However, Johnny's initial session produced two songs, 'Wonderful, Wonderful,' which was released immediately, but didn't sell until the second song, 'It's Not For Me To Say,' became a smash six months later.") (Note: "Wonderful! Wonderful!" spent 39 weeks on Billboard magazine's Top 100 record chart, a predecessor to the Hot 100 that combined the statistics from the magazine's Best Sellers in Stores, Most Played by Jockeys and Most Played in Jukeboxes charts. It was several months into its Top 100 run, however, before it reached its height in popularity. The song debuted on the Top 100 for the week ending January 30, 1957, at number 71 but took a roller coaster ride from there, falling to 81 the following week, surging to 57 by March 6, dropping to 70 the following week, rising to 56 on March 20 and falling to 60 the week after that. When it reached the top 40 on May 1, Columbia ran a full-page ad in Billboard that impressed upon readers how the song had found success five months after the magazine reviewed it.) When "Wonderful! Wonderful!" peaked at number 17 on the Top 100, number 14 on their list of the 25 songs Most Played by Jockeys and number 18 on their list of the 30 Best Sellers in Stores on the surveys for the week ending July 13, "It's Not for Me to Say" was several positions higher at numbers 6, 7 and 12, respectively, after having already peaked at number 5 on the Top 100 for the week ending July 6 and number 6 on the Best Sellers in Stores list for the week ending June 29. It peaked on the Most Played by Jockeys chart at number 6 for the week ending July 27. On the magazine's year-end list of the top 50 singles of 1957, the song came in at number 20.

In Canada, "It's Not for Me to Say" was number 2 for 7 weeks (June 24 - August 5), kept out of number 1 for 6 of those weeks by Elvis Presley's (Let Me Be Your) Teddy Bear.

When Billboard commemorated the 60th anniversary of Mathis's career in 2016, "It's Not for Me to Say" was number 3 on their list of his 10 top-charting hits.

== Charts ==
=== Weekly charts ===
Weekly chart performance for "It's Not for Me to Say"
Chart (1957)	Peak position
Canada (CHUM Hit Parade)	2
US Top 100 (Billboard)	5
US Best Sellers in Stores (Billboard)	6
US Most Played by Jockeys (Billboard)	6
US Top 60 Best Selling Tunes on Records (Cash Box)	5

=== Year-end charts ===
Year-end chart performance for "It's Not for Me to Say"
Chart (1957)	Peak position
US Top 100 (Billboard)	20
US Best Selling Records (Cash Box)	3

== Critical reception ==
=== Original recording ===
Cashbox magazine described "It's Not for Me to Say" as "one of the most beautiful love tales we've heard in a long while". They concluded, "Brilliant wedding of melody, lyrics, and Mathis' warm, wistful, penetrating voice." Billboard magazine wrote, "A compelling tune with a polite, underplayed reading that sells well. Piano-guitar hacking catches the ear and holds on."

American Songwriter included "It's Not for Me to Say" on its list of 5 Songs that Show Johnny Mathis Is the King of the Classic Ballad Singers. They wrote, "His control and slow-build into the big finish are both masterful and even more amazing considering how young he was at the time."

=== Cover versions ===
Cyril Stapleton recorded an instrumental version of the song with his orchestra in 1957, which Cashbox described as "charming". AllMusic selected Jane Morgan's recording of the song as a track pick from her 1957 album Fascination. AllMusic also selected a recording by the Ray Conniff Singers that was a medley pairing the song with Mathis's "Chances Are" from their album So Much in Love as a track pick.
