= Enchanted Island (film) =

1958 film by Allan Dwan

- 1958 US Theatrical Poster
- Directed by: Allan Dwan
- Screenplay by: James Leicester; Harold Jacob Smith
- Based on: Typee; 1846 novel by Herman Melville
- Produced by: Benedict Bogeaus
- Starring: Dana Andrews; Jane Powell; Don Dubbins; Arthur Shields; Ted de Corsia; Friedrich von Ledebur
- Cinematography: Jorge Stahl Jr.
- Edited by: James Leicester
- Music by: Raúl Lavista
- Production companies: Waverly Productions; RKO Radio Pictures
- Distributed by: Warner Bros. Pictures
- Release date: November 8, 1958 (U.S.)
- Running time: 94 minutes
- Country: United States
- Language: English
- Budget: $600,000

Enchanted Island is a 1958 American Technicolor adventure film distributed by Warner Bros., directed by Allan Dwan, produced by Benedict Bogeaus, and written by Harold Jacob Smith, James Leicester, and Al Stillman. It is based on Herman Melville's novel Typee, which was also the film's working title. The title song, "Enchanted Island", written by Stillman and Robert Allen, was performed on the soundtrack by The Four Lads, who had a hit recording of the song on Columbia Records.

The film started out as an RKO movie, but when RKO went bankrupt, it was released by Warner Bros. Pictures. Enchanted Island was also the next-to-last film directed by Dwan, whose prolific career dated back to 1913. It was the last big-screen appearance of one of the film's stars, Jane Powell.

== Plot ==
Two 19th-century sailors, Abner (Dana Andrews) and Tom (Don Dubbins), jump ship after their captain, Vangs (Ted de Corsia), refuses them shore leave and warns them what a dangerous place this particular island is. They disobey him and soon discover their tropical paradise is a cannibal stronghold.

There are two tribes on the island, one friendly, but the other, the Typee, a cannibal tribe. Jimmy Dooley (Arthur Shields), a white man like themselves, befriends the newcomers and offers them a "hideout," but it turns out Dooley has been hired by Vangs to find his missing men.

Abney becomes acquainted with the beautiful Fayaway (Jane Powell), adopted daughter of the chief, Mehevi (Friedrich von Ledebur), from a long-ago relationship between a shipwrecked sailor and a native girl. When a fight between tribes breaks out, Tom wants to flee but Abner likes island life and the girl. He fights with the Typee and saves Mehevi's life.

Tom takes off, determined to get away, and back to civilization. The chief approves of the love between Abner and Fayaway and permits them to wed. But soon comes the discovery that Tom did not get away, and when Abner and Fayaway interrupt a cannibalistic ritual, they are sentenced to death by Mehevi.

When they try to run, Abner makes it back to the boat but Fayaway does not, a warrior piercing her with a spear. Abner carries her back to the boat and to Vangs, who once again understands why his sailors should never venture onto land.

== Cast ==
- Dana Andrews as Abner "Ab" Bedford
- Jane Powell as Fayaway
- Don Dubbins as Tom
- Arthur Shields as James "Jimmy" Dooley
- Ted de Corsia as Capt. Vangs
- Friedrich von Ledebur as Mehevi

== Production ==
In 1944 it was announced that Monogram Pictures were going to make a film of Typee. The film was not made.

In the 1950s John Huston was going to film it with Gregory Peck for Allied Artists (the new name for Monogram). Allied spent a reported $500,000 developing it including a $250,000 commitment to Peck. Then producer Benedict Bogeaus announced he was going to make his own version with Ray Milland, pointing out the novel was in the public domain, claiming he had registered the title and had a script ready from James Leceister, as well as footage of Fiji. Bogeaus signed Edmund Goulding to direct.

Eventually Goulding was replaced with Allan Dwan and Dana Andrews and Jane Powell signed to star. Filming began 21 November 1957 in Puerto Marques, Mexico. RKO agreed to distribute.

Dwan later said he read Typee "and thought, well, if we just do what he wrote, maybe it'd work. But when you start to mess around with a book like that..." He added:

The movements were all right in the picture, and the backgrounds were good - it looked like a South Seas Island, though we faked it up down in Mexico. But I suffered through it with a drunken actor and a nice girl who didn’t belong in it - Jane Powell - she just looked false as hell. She looked like a little girl pretending. It we had a real native kid or even a young Mexican girl, it would have been fine. Because the picture had an accent. But this sophisticated little prima donna couldn't bend herself down to it. And it didn't jell. It wasn't her fault - bad casting - she just didn't belong.

Jane Powell was "thrilled" when asked to make the film as she did not have to sing and her character died at the end. She said the producer had the film rewritten so Powell's character did not die out of fear of offending fans. Powell called the film "terrible" and said neither Andrews or Dwan "demonstrated any interest in the project. Allan Dwan seemed so thoroughly bored that I thought he didn't want to be on the set at all."

Bogeaus and Waverly Productions later sued Andrews for $159,769 for breach of contract, citing twenty times when the actor was unable to work due to “extreme and severe self-induced intoxication”. The matter settled out of court.

Dana Andrews called it "probably" his "worst picture... John Huston originally had the rights to it, but when he sold the story, the new producer’s wife completely re-wrote it, took out everything of quality in it and we were given the worst dialogue you could ever imagine to try to say. I don’t think anyone ever made any sense of it. Disgraceful!"

According to Dwan, Bogeaus could not use the title because of an agreement with the Producers' Association. "And even then he had trouble with Allied Artists over it. But when they looked at the picture, they said, 'I guess we won't sue you for that.' ".

== Reception ==
Variety said it "features some spectacular location scenery as background and practically nothing but confusion in the foreground...Its prospects, except as a visually attractive filler, are dim."
