= List of 1950s musical artists =

For music from a year in the 1950s, go to 50 | 51 | 52 | 53 | 54 | 55 | 56 | 57 | 58 | 59

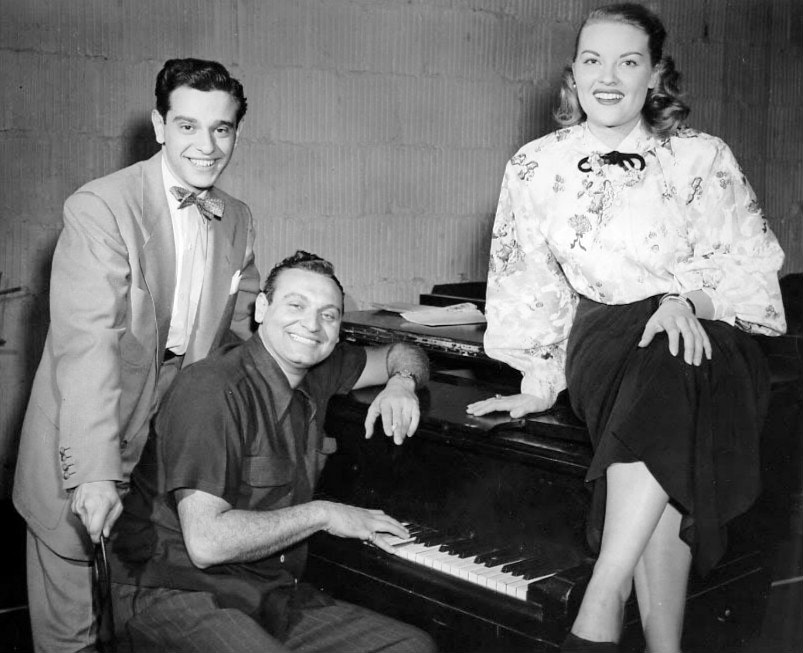
Frankie Laine (at piano) and Patti Page, c. 1950

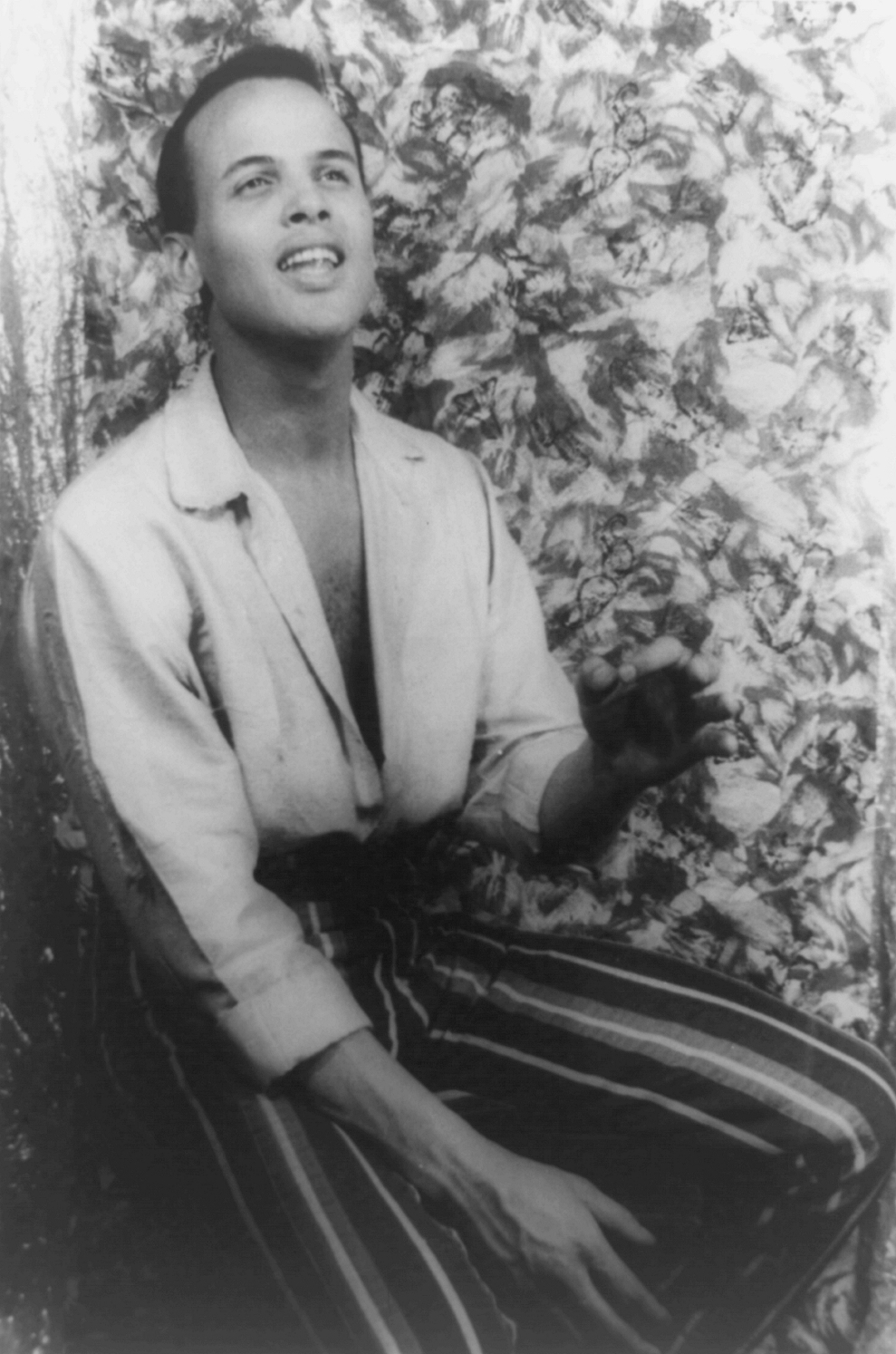
Harry Belafonte, 1954

This is a partial list of notable active and inactive bands and musicians of the 1950s.

== Musicians ==
- Black Ace
- Johnny Ace
- Lee Allen
- Gene Allison
- Marian Anderson
- Pink Anderson
- Paul Anka
- Louis Armstrong
- Eddy Arnold
- Chet Atkins
- Gene Autry
- Frankie Avalon
- Charles Aznavour
- LaVern Baker
- Hank Ballard
- Sidney Bechet
- Harry Belafonte
- Jesse Belvin
- Tex Beneke
- Boyd Bennett
- Tony Bennett
- Chuck Berry
- Richard Berry
- Otis Blackwell
- Scrapper Blackwell
- Blind Blake
- The Big Bopper
- Johnny Bond
- Pat Boone
- Jimmy Bowen
- Calvin Boze
- Jackie Brenston
- Teresa Brewer
- Big Bill Broonzy
- Clarence "Gatemouth" Brown
- James Brown
- Nappy Brown
- Roy Brown
- Ruth Brown
- Dave Brubeck
- Jimmy Bryant
- Solomon Burke
- Johnny Burnette
- James Burton
- Erskine Butterfield
- Sam Butera
- Maria Callas
- Glen Campbell
- Martha Carson
- Goree Carter
- Johnny Cash
- Bobby Charles
- Ray Charles
- Boozoo Chavis
- Chubby Checker
- Clifton Chenier
- Lou Christie
- June Christy
- Eugene Church
- Joe Clay
- Dee Clark
- Patsy Cline
- Rosemary Clooney
- Eddie Cochran
- Nat "King" Cole
- John Coltrane
- Perry Como
- Floyd Council
- Pee Wee Crayton
- Mac Curtis
- Bing Crosby
- Bob Crosby
- Gary Crosby
- Arthur Crudup
- Dick Dale
- Dick Dale (singer)
- Dalida
- Bobby Darin
- Hal David
- Miles Davis
- Sammy Davis Jr.
- Bobby Day
- Doris Day
- Bo Diddley
- Willie Dixon
- Carl Dobkins Jr.
- Bill Doggett
- Fats Domino
- Lonnie Donegan
- Jimmy Dorsey
- Lee Dorsey
- Tommy Dorsey
- K. C. Douglas
- Rusty Draper
- Champion Jack Dupree
- Jimmy Durante
- Leroy Van Dyke
- Werly Fairburn
- H-Bomb Ferguson
- Eddie Fisher
- Miss Toni Fisher
- Sonny Fisher
- Ella Fitzgerald
- Connie Francis
- Ernie Freeman
- Mary Ford
- Tennessee Ernie Ford
- Helen Forrest
- Alan Freed
- Johnny Fuller
- Billy Fury
- Earl Gaines
- Hank Garland
- Judy Garland
- Clarence Garlow
- Georgia Gibbs
- Dizzy Gillespie
- Dick Glasser
- Arthur Godfrey
- Benny Goodman
- Eydie Gormé
- Charlie Gracie
- Gogi Grant
- Jack Guthrie
- Roy Hamilton
- Lionel Hampton
- Pat Hare
- Slim Harpo
- Homer Harris
- Peppermint Harris
- Wynonie Harris
- Hawkshaw Hawkins
- Screamin' Jay Hawkins
- Al Hibbler
- Chuck Higgins
- Earl Hines
- Silas Hogan
- Smokey Hogg
- Ron Holden
- Billie Holiday
- Buddy Holly
- John Lee Hooker
- Lightnin' Hopkins
- Johnny Horton
- David Houston
- Eddy Howard
- Ivory Joe Hunter
- Bull Moose Jackson
- Mahalia Jackson
- Elmore James
- Etta James
- Harry James
- Homesick James
- Joni James
- Sonny James
- Waylon Jennings
- Dr. John
- Little Willie John
- Jimmy Jones
- Louis Jordan
- Don Julian
- Kitty Kallen
- Chris Kenner
- Anita Kerr
- Albert King
- B.B. King
- Ben E. King
- Earl King
- Freddie King
- Pee Wee King
- Saunders King
- Christine Kittrell
- Baker Knight
- Sonny Knight
- Buddy Knox
- Gene Krupa
- Frankie Laine
- Major Lance
- Mario Lanza
- Ellis Larkins
- Brenda Lee
- Dickie Lee
- Peggy Lee
- Lazy Lester
- Jerry Lee Lewis
- Smiley Lewis
- Little Willie Littlefield
- Julie London
- Joe Hill Louis
- Willie Love
- Frankie Lymon
- Loretta Lynn
- Dean Martin
- Grady Martin
- Janis Martin
- Johnny Mathis
- Jimmy McCracklin
- Skeets McDonald
- Big Jay McNeely
- Clyde McPhatter
- Max Merritt
- Big Maceo Merriweather
- Amos Milburn
- Chuck Miller
- Mitch Miller
- Roy Milton
- Garnet Mimms
- Bobby Mitchell
- Guy Mitchell
- Charles Mingus
- Thelonious Monk
- Bill Monroe
- Vaughn Monroe
- Wes Montgomery
- Benny Moré
- Rose Murphy
- Jimmy Nelson
- Ricky Nelson
- Robert Nighthawk
- Jimmy Nolen
- Nervous Norvus
- Donald O'Conner
- St. Louis Jimmy Oden
- Odetta
- Gene O'Quin
- Roy Orbison
- Johnny Otis
- Patti Page
- Charlie Parker
- Les Paul
- Art Pepper
- Carl Perkins
- Oscar Peterson
- Phil Phillips
- Webb Pierce
- Gene Pitney
- Pérez Prado
- Elvis Presley
- Johnny Preston
- Jimmy Preston
- Lloyd Price
- Louis Prima
- Johnnie Ray
- Tampa Red
- Jerry Reed
- Jimmy Reed
- Della Reese
- Django Reinhardt
- Buddy Rich
- Cliff Richard
- Little Richard
- Tommy Ridgley
- Billy Lee Riley
- Tex Ritter
- Johnny Rivers
- Max Roach
- Marty Robbins
- Jimmie Rodgers
- Arsenio Rodríguez
- Kenny Rogers
- Bobby Rydell
- Kyu Sakamoto
- Washboard Sam
- Tommy Sands
- Mabel Scott
- Neil Sedaka
- Pete Seeger
- Johnny Shines
- Troy Shondell
- Dinah Shore
- Frank Sinatra
- Memphis Slim
- Sunnyland Slim
- Huey "Piano" Smith
- Ray Smith
- Jo Stafford
- Kay Starr
- Tommy Steele
- Joan Sutherland
- Art Tatum
- Jesse Thomas
- Rufus Thomas
- Hank Thompson
- Big Mama Thornton
- Johnny Tillotson
- Merle Travis
- Big Joe Turner
- Ike Turner
- Ritchie Valens
- Bobby Vee
- Gene Vincent
- T-Bone Walker
- Little Walter
- Mercy Dee Walton
- Baby Boy Warren
- Muddy Waters
- Johnny "Guitar" Watson
- Joe Weaver
- Ben Webster

== Bands ==
- Jay & The Americans
- The Ames Brothers
- The Andrews Sisters
- Dave Appell & the Applejacks
- Harold Melvin & the Blue Notes
- The Bell Notes
- Bill Haley & His Comets
- The Belmonts
- Dion & The Belmonts
- The Bobbettes
- The Bonnie Sisters
- The Bosstones
- The Buchanan Brothers
- The Cadets
- The Cadillacs
- The Capris
- The Cardinals
- The Champs
- The Chantels
- The Charioteers
- Otis Williams and the Charms
- The Chimes
- The Chi-Lites
- The Chips
- The Chordettes
- The Chords
- The Cleftones
- The Clovers
- The Coasters
- The Collegians
- Bill Haley and the Comets
- The Corsairs
- The Counts
- The Crew Cuts
- The Crescendos
- The Crickets
- The Crows
- Danny & the Juniors
- Jan & Dean
- The Dells
- The Del-Satins
- The Delta Rhythm Boys
- The Del-Vikings
- Deep River Boys
- The Dovells
- The Dubs
- The Duprees
- The Diamonds
- The Drifters
- The Earls
- The Echoes
- The Edsels
- The El Dorados
- The Elegants
- The Emotions
- The Escorts
- The Everly Brothers
- The Fairfield Four
- The Falcons
- The Flamingos
- The Flairs
- The Fleetwoods
- The Five Satins
- The Five Discs
- The Five Keys
- The Five Sharps
- The Fontane Sisters
- The Four Aces
- The Four Buddies
- The Four Freshmen
- The Four Knights
- The Four Lads
- The Four Lovers
- The Four Preps
- The Four Tops
- The Four Tunes
- The Gaylords
- The G-Clefs
- The Golden Gate Quartet
- The Harptones
- The Hearts
- The Heathertones
- The Hilltoppers
- The Hollywood Flames
- Johnny & The Hurricanes
- The Impalas
- Little Anthony and the Imperials
- The Impressions
- The Ink Spots
- The Isley Brothers
- The Jewels
- The Jesters
- The Jive Bombers
- The Jive Five
- Don & Juan
- The Jubalaires
- The Kingston Trio
- Kings of Rhythm
- The Larks
- The Lettermen
- Frankie Lymon & The Teenagers
- The McGuire Sisters
- The Medallions
- The Mello-Kings
- The Mello-Moods
- The Mills Brothers
- The Midnighters
- The Monotones
- The Moonglows
- The Mystics
- The Nutmegs
- The O'Jays
- The Oak Ridge Boys
- The Orioles
- The Osmonds
- The Paragons
- The Penguins
- The Pied Pipers
- The Platters
- The Pony-Tails
- The Quarrymen
- The Quotations
- Randy & The Rainbows
- The Rattlesnakes (1955 band)
- The Ravens
- The Regents
- The Righteous Brothers
- Norman Fox & The Rob-Roys
- The Robins
- The Sensations
- The Shadows
- The Shepherd Sisters
- The Skyliners
- The Solitaires
- Sons of The Pioneers
- The Spaniels
- The Sparkletones
- The Spiders
- The Spinners
- Joey Dee & The Starliters
- The Stereos
- The Swallows
- Mickey & Sylvia
- Tátrai Quartet
- Tavares
- The Teenagers
- The Teen Queens
- The Tornados
- The Turbans
- The Tymes
- The Valentines
- The Virtues
- The Volumes
- Billy Ward & The Dominoes
- The Wrens
- Maurice Williams and the Zodiacs
- Windsbacher Knabenchor

== Gallery ==
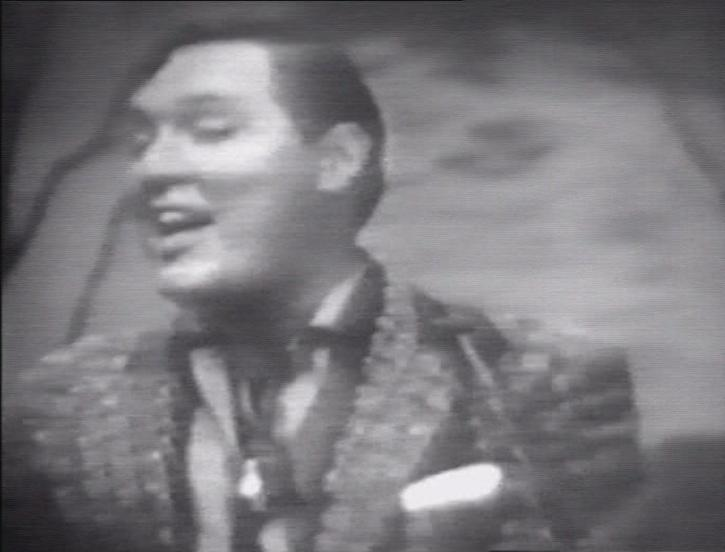
Bill Haley of Bill Haley and the Comets singing "Rock Around the Clock", 1955

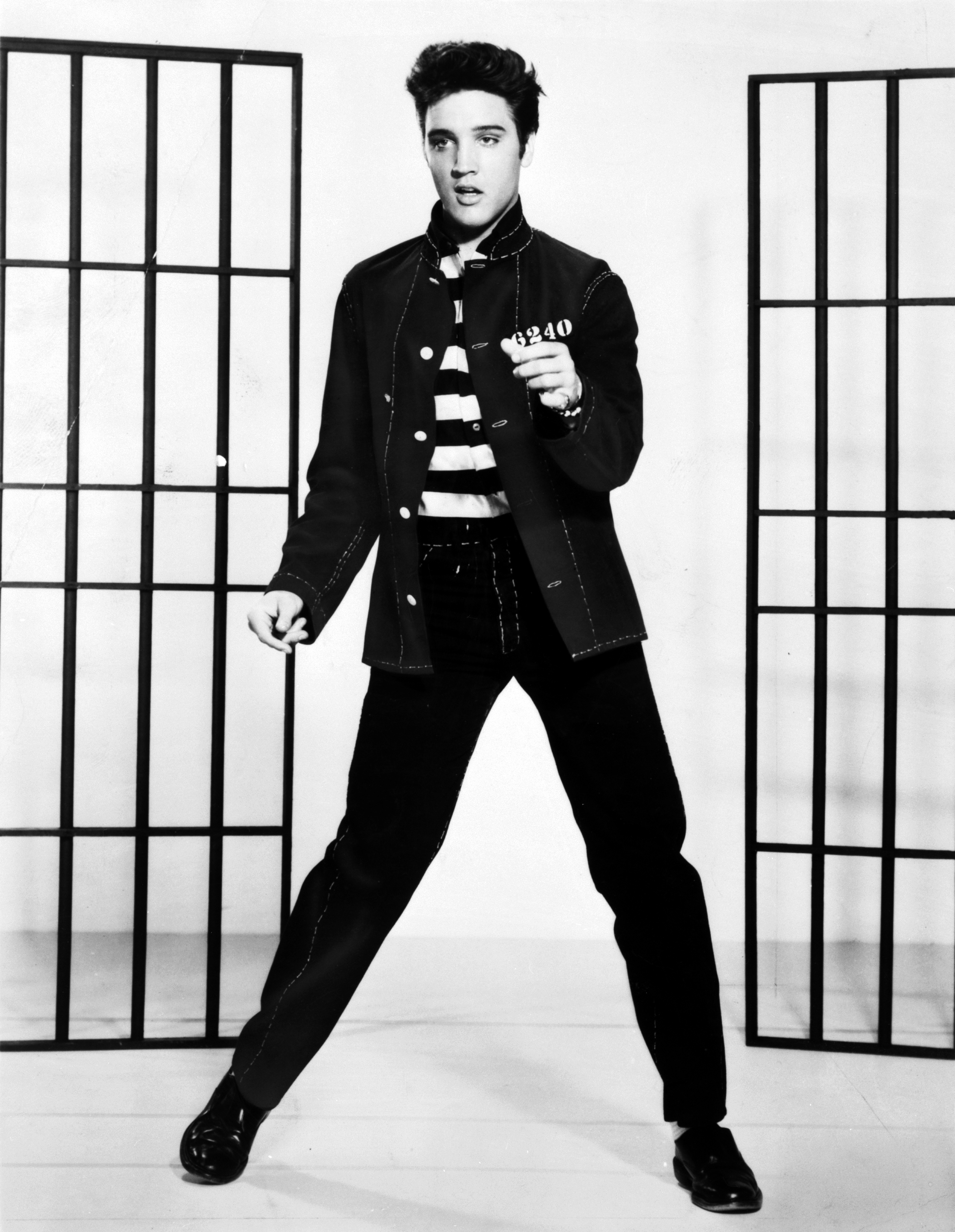
Elvis Presley in a publicity photo for Jailhouse Rock (1957)

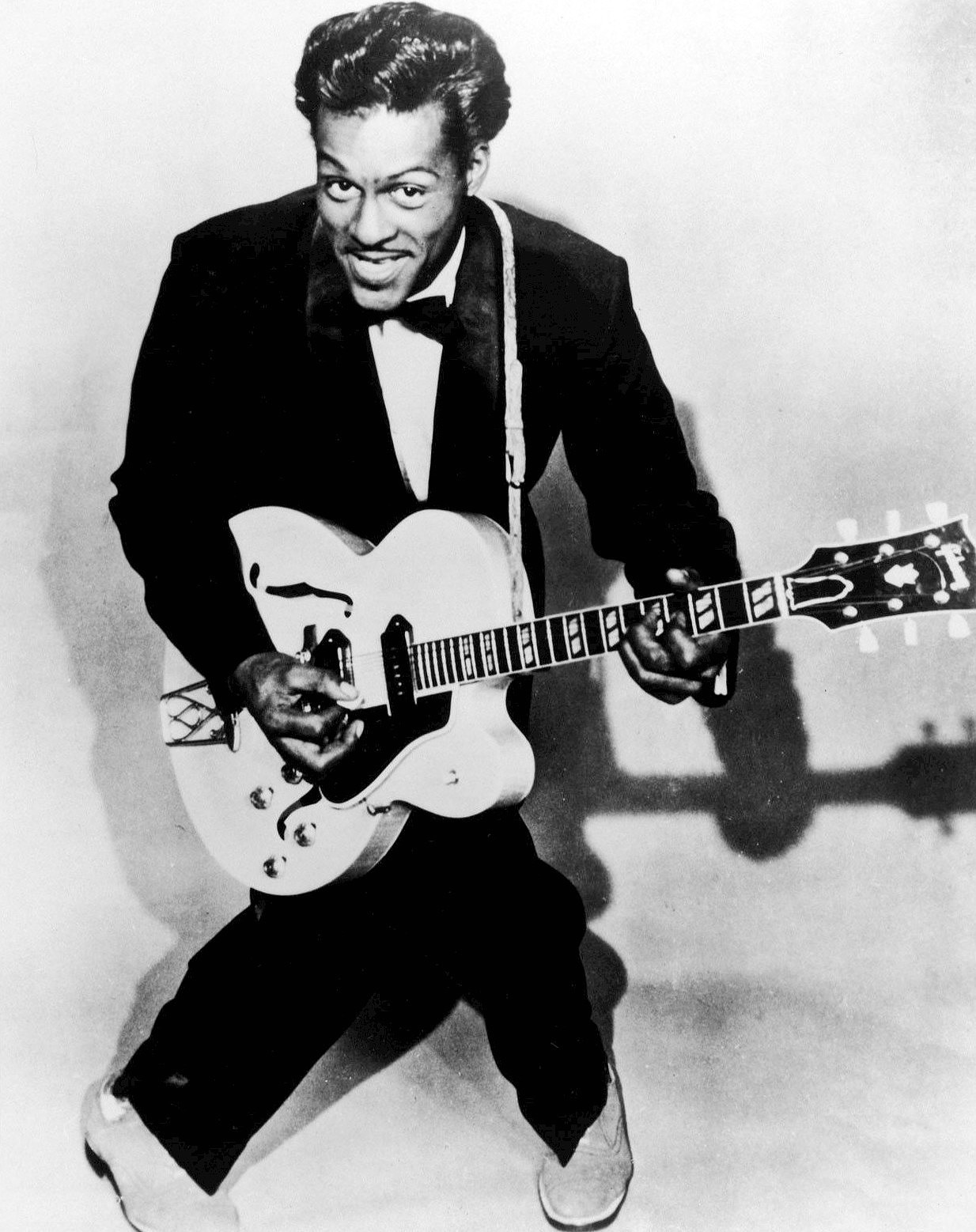
Chuck Berry in 1957

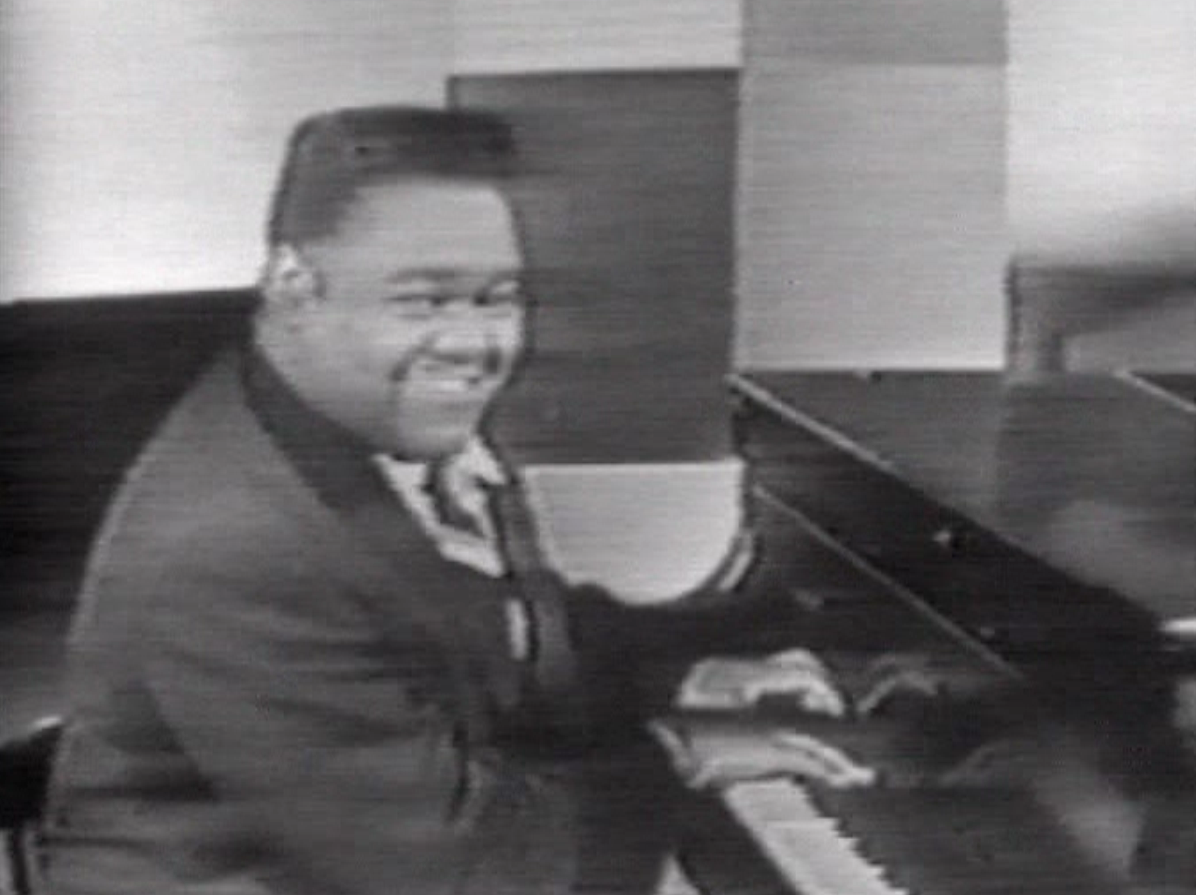
Fats Domino singing "Blueberry Hill" on The Alan Freed Show c. 1956

== See also ==
- Music history of the United States in the 1950s
- 1950s in music
- 1960s in music
- 1940s in music
- Timeline of musical events
