= Everything Goes =

Everything Goes may refer to:

- Everything Goes!!!, a 1960 album by The Four Lads
- Everything Goes (Canadian TV series), a 1974 Canadian variety television series
- Everything Goes (game show), a 1980s American television game show
- Everything Goes (film), a 2004 Australian short film

== See also ==
- Everything Goes Cold
- Everything Goes Numb
- Everything Goes On
- Everything Goes Wrong
