= On the Sunny Side =

On the Sunny Side may refer to:

- On the Sunny Side (1942 film), a drama directed by Harold D. Schuster
- On the Sunny Side (1961 film), an East German musical comedy film
- On the Sunny Side (The Four Lads album), 1956
- On the Sunny Side (Paul Quinichette album), 1957

== See also ==
- "Keep On the Sunny Side", an 1899 song
- "On the Sunny Side of the Street", a 1930 song
- On the Sunny Side of the Strip, a 1960 album by the George Shearing quintet
- Sunny Side of the Street (disambiguation)
