= I Just Don't Know =

"I Just Don't Know" is a popular song with music written by Robert Allen and lyrics by Joe Stone. The song was published in 1957.

The recording by The Four Lads (made April 4, 1957) was released by Columbia Records as catalog number 40914. It first reached the Billboard charts on May 20, 1957. On the Disk Jockey chart, it peaked at #17; while on the composite chart of the top 100 songs, it reached #22. In Canada, the song reached #25 on the CHUM Charts.
