= Can You Find It in Your Heart? =

Single by Tony Bennett
- B-side: "Forget Her"
- Released: March 12, 1956
- Recorded: 1955
- Genre: Vocal pop
- Length: 2:38
- Label: Columbia
- Songwriters: Robert Allen; Al Stillman

Tony Bennett singles chronology
"Close Your Eyes" (1955)	"Can You Find It in Your Heart?" (1956)	"From the Candy Store on the Corner to the Chapel on the Hill" (1956)

"Can You Find It in Your Heart?" is a pop song with music by Robert Allen and lyrics by Al Stillman, published in 1956.

The recording by Tony Bennett was released by Columbia Records as catalog number 40667. It first reached the Billboard magazine charts on May 5, 1956, and lasted 11 weeks on the chart. On the Disk Jockey chart, it peaked at #20; on the Best Seller chart, at #16; on the Juke Box chart, at #18; on the composite chart of the top 100 songs, it reached #19.
