= Breezin' Along =

Studio album by The Four Lads
- Released: 1958
- Genre: Pop standard
- Label: Columbia

Breezin' Along is an LP album by The Four Lads released by Columbia Records as catalog number CL 1223 (monaural) and CS 8035 (stereo) in 1958, containing mostly popular standard songs. The Four Lads were backed by Ray Ellis' orchestra.

== Track listing ==
Track number	Song	Songwriter(s)	Time
1	Breezin' Along With The Breeze	Haven Gillespie/Seymour Simons/Richard Whiting	2:15
2	That Old Feeling	Sammy Fain/Lew Brown	2:43
3	Swingin' Down the Lane	Gus Kahn/Isham Jones	2:14
4	Someone Like You	Harry Warren/Ralph Blane	2:14
5	You Were Meant For Me	Arthur Freed/Nacio Herb Brown	2:20
6	Hit The Road To Dreamland	Harold Arlen/Johnny Mercer	2:20
7	Long Ago (And Far Away)	Jerome Kern/Ira Gershwin	2:31
8	That's My Desire	Helmy Kresa/Carroll Loveday	3:00
9	Someone To Watch Over Me	George Gershwin/Ira Gershwin	2:56
10	I'll String Along With You	Harry Warren/Al Dubin	3:20
11	Come To Me	Robert Allen/Peter Lind Hayes	2:41
12	A Lovely Way To Spend An Evening	Jimmy McHugh/Harold Adamson	2:48

The collection of mostly standards was similar to the Four Lads' earlier album, On the Sunny Side of the Street, (1956), and the two were combined in a compact disc released by Collectables Records on January 16, 2001.
