= The Smoke Ring (band) =

American rock band

The Smoke Ring was an American rock band from Norfolk, Nebraska, active in the 1960s. It was formed from two previous regionally popular rock and roll groups, Little Joe & the Ramrods and The Strollers. (Note: Not to be confused with the other band called The Strollers, who saw chart success in Malaysia in the late 60s and early 70s.) They had strong regional success but charted only one national hit, 1969's "No, Not Much".

== Little Joe & the Ramrods ==
"Little Joe" Hupp, (guitar, piano) founded this group in the early 1960s, and had some success playing throughout the Midwestern United States. They recorded a single in Oklahoma, "B.B. Limbo" b/w "Yogi Twist", released on Soma Records; a second recording session, in Minneapolis, yielded "Somebody Touched Me", "Hurtin' Inside", "Oop Poo Pa Doo", and "We Belong Together". The Ramrods split up over a disagreement, at which time discussions with members of The Strollers picked up.

== The Strollers ==
The Strollers had originally formed in 1959 and played mostly local events into the early 1960s. Among its members were Little Joe's brother, Bob Hupp. In 1965 the group lost its drummer and decided to merge with Little Joe & the Ramrods into one group, which they would rename The Smoke Ring in 1966.

== The Smoke Ring ==
Their first national release was the single "That Girl Was My Girl" on Mala Records in 1966. Starting in 1967, they expanded their lineup to include more brass instruments, and regularly toured the Midwest, opening for Dickie Lee, Rufus Thomas, The Shangri-Las, Bobby Vee, and The Everly Brothers. Soon after meeting Thomas and Lee, they booked time at Sun Studios and recorded the single "No, Not Much", a cover of a 1950s hit by The Four Lads. The local disc (released on Goldust Records) was picked up for national distribution by Buddah Records, and the tune saw nationwide success, becoming a hit in several major metropolitan areas in the U.S. and climbing to #85 on the Billboard Hot 100 early in 1969. A second single on Buddah, "Portrait of My Love", missed the charts, and a full-length that had been recorded was shelved; it has yet to see release. The group appeared on American Bandstand in 1969 following the single's success. Later in 1969, Certron Records released their single "High on a Rainbow" b/w "First Reaction", which also did not chart but was a regional success. During this time, the group's wardrobe consisted of tuxedos fitted with bell bottom trousers. They disbanded in 1972; that same year, Little Joe Hupp released a locally produced full-length, Heavy Metal Whale, under the name Smoke Ring, which did not feature any of the band's previous members. The members, Mike Smith, guitar and vocals, Mike McKern, drums and vocals, Ralph Goldhiem, keyboards and vocals, Joe Lalich, bass and vocals, Scotty Hastings, drums and vocals. This song was recorded at Shue records engineered by Garth Fundis in Nashville. The next band, were some of the members (including lead vocalist Tommy Shaw) continued under the name MSFunk in 1973, basing themselves out of Chicago.

The group was inducted into the Nebraska Music Hall of Fame in 1995, and has regularly reunited for regional concerts since then.

== MSFunk ==
Smoke Ring guitarist Keith Goins put together the last version of The Smoke Ring in September 1971. At that time, all he had left was drummer Danny Keller, so he nearly had to start from scratch. Lindy Gallaher (bass player from "Isaac" in Kansas) was the first to arrive, along with Colin Keefe (trumpet and lead vocals) and Mike Ragatz (trombone) from another regionally based horn band, "The Chancellors". Lindy suggested two other members from "Isaac": Robert Orr (keyboards and trombone) and Larry Stewart (trumpet, sax, and flute). The new players moved into Kings Ballroom (owned by band manager Joe Hupp) and put an entire show together in three days. Six months later, the band moved to Memphis, soon hired Tommy Shaw and Chaz Baker and not long after that changed their name to MSFunk. MSFunk members later became members of Toto, The Ides of March, Styx, Damn Yankees, Le Roux, and Shaw Blades.

== Members ==
Little Joe & the Ramrods

- Little Joe Hupp - guitar, piano (born Joseph Ferdinand Hupp; August 2, 1941 – May 9, 2020)
- Doug Speidel
- Mike Sund (1944–1985)
- Leland Grieves
- Dino Reeves
- Terry Zobel
- Larry Young
- John Schrad
- Gene Hammerlun

The Strollers

- Chuck Asmus - drums, vocals
- Pat Wead - guitar, vocals
- Jerry Benjamin - guitar
- Bob Hupp - bass, vocals
- Jim Casey - guitar

The Smoke Ring

- Jerry Benjamin - drums, guitar (1966–1967)
- Tom Benjamin - drums (1966–67)
- Jim Casey - saxophone, guitar ('66-'70)
- Dave Dohren - trumpet ('66-'70)
- Bob Hupp - guitar ('66-'69)
- Little Joe Hupp - keyboards ('66-'68)
- Nick Hupp - bass ('66-'70)
- John Schrad - saxophone ('66-'68)
- Chuck Asmus - drums, vocals ('66-'68)
- Roger Volk - drums ('68-'71)
- Greg "Bosco" Goodman - keyboards ('69-'71)
- Ron McClure - trumpet ('68-'69)
- Mike "Pinky" Semrad - trumpet and guitar ('68-'69)
- Steve Dahl - vocals
- Jon Hischke - saxophone
- Garth Fundis - vocals
- Keith Goins - guitar, vocals ('70-'72)
- Colin Keefe - vocals, trumpet ('71-'72)
- Danny Keller -drums ('71-'72)
- Tommy Shaw - guitar, vocals ('72)
- Lindy Gallaher - bass ('71-'72)
- Robert Orr - keyboards, trombone, vocals ('71-'72)
- Mike Raggatz - trombone ('71-'72)
- Larry Stewart - trumpet, sax ('71-'72)

Transition to MS Funk

- Keith Goins - guitar, vocals ('72-'74)
- Danny Keller - drums ('72-'73) ('75-'76)
- Lindy Gallaher - bass ('72-'76)
- Colin Keefe - lead vocals, trumpet ('72-'74)
- Robert Orr - keyboards, vocals, trombone ('72-'76)
- Larry Stewart - trumpet, flute, sax, vocals ('72-'74)
- Chaz Baker - trombone, vocals, electric piano ('72-'75)
- Tommy Shaw - guitar, vocals ('72-75)
- Fergie Frederiksen - vocals ('75 -'76)
- Mike Borch - drums ('73-'75)
- Richie Mayer - guitar, vocals ('75-'76)
- Bobby Piatt - vocals ('75-'76)
