= Jimmy Arnold (musician) =

Canadian singer (1932–2004)

Jimmie Arnold
- Born: James Francis Arnold; January 4, 1932; Toronto, Ontario, Canada
- Died: June 15, 2004 (aged 72) Sacramento, California, United States
- Occupations: Singer, music teacher
- Formerly of: The Four Lads

James Francis Arnold (January 4, 1932 – June 15, 2004) was a Canadian singer.

== Career ==
He became famous as an original member of the quartet The Four Lads. He appeared on hits such as "Standing on the Corner" (1956), "No, Not Much" (1955) and "Istanbul (Not Constantinople)" (1953). After 30 years of being with the group, Arnold retired from the stage and began teaching music through the James Arnold School of Voice in the 1980s. During his 30 year teaching career, he had many students become successful entertainers on Broadway and in opera.

== Death ==
Arnold died of lung cancer on June 15, 2004.

== Awards ==
Arnold, along with the Four Lads, were inducted into the 1984 Canadian Music Hall of Fame and the Vocal Group Hall of Fame in 2003
