= Happy Anniversary (1959 film) =

- Theatrical release poster
- Directed by: David Miller
- Screenplay by: Jerome Chodorov; Joseph Fields
- Based on: Anniversary Waltz; 1954 play by Jerome Chodorov; Joseph Fields
- Produced by: Ralph Fields
- Starring: David Niven; Mitzi Gaynor; Carl Reiner; Loring Smith; Monique Van Vooren
- Cinematography: Lee Garmes
- Edited by: Richard Meyer
- Music by: Robert Allen; Sol Kaplan; Al Stillman
- Distributed by: United Artists
- Release date: November 10, 1959
- Running time: 81 minutes
- Country: United States
- Language: English
- Budget: $1 million
- Box office: $1,800,000 (US/ Canada)

Happy Anniversary is a 1959 American comedy film starring David Niven and Mitzi Gaynor. Directed by David Miller, the movie's cast also included Carl Reiner and a young Patty Duke.

== Plot ==
Chris Walters is a happily married father of two. For his 13th wedding anniversary, he sneaks home with a gift for wife Alice, a diamond brooch, and with a desire to have a romantic interlude.

Interruptions ensue. If it isn't their children, Debbie, and Okkie, needing something, it's their maid, Millie, or it's Alice's mother, Lilly, on the phone. And then two delivery men arrive with a new television set. It's a gift from Alice's parents, Lilly and Arthur.

Chris is not pleased. He hates television, and thinks the whole idea of TV is a needless distraction and corrupting influence on today's youth.

At work, Chris has a partner, Bud, who is trying to woo a new client, Jeanette Revere, a woman who has been divorced four times. Jeanette is amazed in this day and age that a couple can remain happily married as long as the Walters' have.

Over a celebration dinner, Chris lets it slip that he and Alice had sex a year before they got married. Lilly and Arthur are offended, having been under the impression that Alice didn't have sex with Chris until they were wed. They storm out. Chris is so angry, he kicks in the screen of the new TV. He argues with Alice and has to spend his anniversary night sleeping on the sofa.

A gift arrives from Bud—it's another TV. Chris is irritated again, but promises not to cause a scene this time. When they turn it on, however, a show called "Kids Kouncil" has his daughter Debbie as a guest. And the child blurts out for all to hear that her parents are having marital difficulties, and had been intimate prior to their wedding. Chris again kicks in the TV.

Chris storms out of the house this time. Elsewhere, Alice's parents also have a quarrel, which eventually leads to Lilly attempting to move in with her daughter. Everybody's angry now.

A distraught Chris wants to come home. Alice feels no one cares about her. She intends to leave home herself. The family doctor, however, suddenly informs Alice that she is pregnant. She decides to give Chris another chance, as a gift arrives, yet another TV. This time it is from Chris.

== Cast ==
- David Niven as Chris Walters
- Mitzi Gaynor as Alice Walters
- Carl Reiner as Bud
- Monique Van Vooren as Jeanette
- Phyllis Povah as Lillian Gans / Grandma
- Loring Smith as Arthur Gans / Grandpa
- Patty Duke as Debbie
- Kevin Coughlin as Ockie Walters
- Elizabeth Wilson as Millie the Maid

== Title song ==
"Happy Anniversary" is also the title of a popular song with music written by Robert Allen and lyrics by Al Stillman, that was introduced in this film. Recordings have been made by Mitzi Gaynor, The Four Lads, Jane Morgan, Maureen Evans and Joan Regan. Jane Morgan's version reached number 15 in Canada.

== Censorship ==
At the time, the Motion Picture Production Code prohibited the portrayal of illicit sex as harmless or positive. For the film to be approved under the Code, a line had to be inserted in post-production in which Chris expresses his regret at having had premarital sex with Alice. As Niven was not available, the line was done as a voice-over impression of Niven by voice actor Allen Swift.

== See also ==
- List of American films of 1959
