= Bob McGrath from Sesame Street =

Studio album by Bob McGrath
- Released: 1970
- Genre: Children's
- Length: 30:46
- Label: Affinity
- Producer: Robert Allen

Bob McGrath from Sesame Street is a studio album released by Bob McGrath in 1970 on Affinity LP record A-1001. The album features Bob singing compositions by Robert Allen, who produced the album. Arrangements were by Stuart Scharf, and Don Casale was the recording engineer. Stereo Dimension Records distributed the album. In 2021, a digital edition of the album was released by Reservoir Media.

== Reception ==
Billboard Magazine called the album "educational and entertaining for all ages" and praised McGrath's warmth and sensitivity. Billboard then listed this album on its "Action Records" list on August 1, 1970. Two weeks later, it entered the Billboard Top LPs chart, where it peaked at No. 126, staying on the chart for eleven weeks.

== Track listing ==
No.	Title	Length
1.	"Good Good Morning Day" (Robert Allen)	3:16
2.	"Me" (Robert Allen)	2:23
3.	"Sunshine Guitar" (Robert Allen – Bob Hilliard)	2:44
4.	"Why Choose to Be Afraid" (Robert Allen)	2:15
5.	"Why Does It Have to Rain on Sunday" (Robert Allen – Al Stillman)	1:55
6.	"So It Doesn’t Whistle" (Robert Allen – Bob Hilliard)	2:39
7.	"Groovin’ on the Sunshine" (Robert Allen)	3:18
8.	"Best Friend" (Robert Allen)	3:39
9.	"Hold On to Your Dream" (Robert Allen)	4:06
10.	"I Can Do It!!" (Robert Allen)	3:40
Total length:		30:46
