= Swing Along =

Studio album by The Four Lads
- Released: 1959
- Genre: Traditional pop
- Label: Columbia

Swing Along is an LP album by The Four Lads, released by Columbia Records as catalog number CS 8106 in 1959.

== Track listing ==
| Track number | Title | Songwriter(s) |
|---|---|---|
| 1 | "The Old Oaken Bucket" | Samuel Woodworth/Matt Damon |
| 2 | "Alouette" (means "Skylark") | |
| 3 | "Comin' Through The Rye" | Robert Burns |
| 4 | "Grandfather's Clock" | Henry Clay Work |
| 5 | "Love's Old Sweet Song" | George Clifton Bingham/James Lyman Molloy |
| 6 | "Swanee River" | Stephen Foster |
| 7 | "Mexicali Rose" | Helen Stone/Jack B. Tenney |
| 8 | "Just How Much I Love You" | Robert Allen |
| 9 | "When I Grow Too Old To Dream" | Oscar Hammerstein II/Sigmund Romberg |
| 10 | "Let Me Call You Sweetheart" | Leo Friedman/Beth Slater Whitson |
| 11 | "Meet Me Tonight In Dreamland" | Leo Friedman/Beth Slater Whitson |
| 12 | "Moonlight Bay" | Percy Wenrich/Edward Madden |
| 13 | "Long, Long Ago" | Thomas Haynes Bayly |

The album was reissued, combined with the 1960 Four Lads album Everything Goes!!!, in compact disc format, by Collectables Records on July 31, 2001.
