= The Mocking Bird =

Song performed by The Four Lads

"The Mocking Bird" is a popular song. It was recorded twice by The Four Lads. It was written by D. Jordan. The B-side was "I May Hate Myself In The Morning".

== Song Information ==
- The first version, made April 16, 1952, was released on Columbia's Okeh label in 1952 (reaching number 23 on the Billboard chart that year) and re-released four years later on Columbia (number 67 on the 1956 chart.) A new recording was made in 1958, entering the Billboard Hot 100 list on November 24, 1958, eventually reaching number 32 on that chart. In Canada, the song reached number 30 on the CHUM Charts.
