= Home for the Holidays (song) =

"(There's No Place Like) Home for the Holidays"
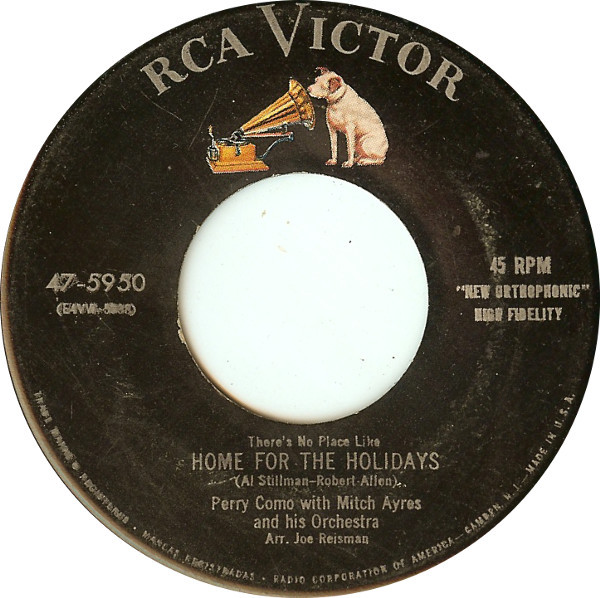

Single by Perry Como with Mitchell Ayres and His Orchestra
- B-side: "Silk Stockings"
- Released: December 1954
- Recorded: November 16, 1954
- Venue: Webster Hall, New York City
- Genre: Christmas, pop
- Length: 2:46
- Label: RCA Victor
- Composer: Robert Allen
- Lyricist: Al Stillman

Perry Como with Mitchell Ayres and His Orchestra singles chronology
"Papa Loves Mambo" (1954)	"(There's No Place Like) Home for the Holidays" (1954)	"A Hubba-Hubba-Hubba (Dig You Later)" (1955)

"(There's No Place Like) Home for the Holidays" is a 1954 song commonly associated with the Christmas and holiday season. The lyrics detail the joys of being in your home community during the holidays and give examples of how some people will travel long distances to be with their loved ones. The music was composed by Robert Allen, with the lyrics written by Al Stillman.

== Perry Como versions ==
The best-known recordings of "Home for the Holidays" were made by Perry Como, who recorded the song twice, both times accompanied by Mitchell Ayres' Orchestra and the Ray Charles Singers.

The first recording of "Home for the Holidays", arranged by Joe Reisman, was made on November 16, 1954. It was released as a single for Christmas that December by RCA Victor. The flip side was "Silk Stockings" (which scored in the Cash Box magazine top 50). In the United States, "Home for the Holidays" peaked at number eight on Billboard magazine's Most Played by Jockeys chart (in the issue dated January 8, 1955) and at number 18 on Billboard's Best Sellers in Stores chart (in the issue dated January 1, 1955). The next Christmas the song was released again, with "God Rest Ye Merry, Gentlemen" as the flip side. The same recorded version was released in the United Kingdom by His Master's Voice, with the flip side "Tina Marie". This recording has appeared on many compilation albums over the years and remains a Christmas radio regular.

Como's second recording of "Home for the Holidays", in stereo and with a different musical arrangement by Joe Lipman, was made on July 15, 1959. It was released as a 33 rpm single, with flip side "Winter Wonderland", by RCA Victor in the U.S. and as a 45 rpm single by His Master's Voice in the UK. This 1959 version was also included on the album, Season's Greetings from Perry Como, and has appeared on many compilations, as well as being played on some radio stations during the holidays.

== Other versions ==
In 1968, Robert Goulet covered the song for his holiday album, Robert Goulet's Wonderful World Of Christmas.

Perhaps the most iconic version of the song, other than the original Perry Como version, is the Carpenters’ recording on their 1984 LP release, An Old Fashioned Christmas.

In 1987, the Muppets sang it in the ABC special, A Muppet Family Christmas.

In 1992, Joe Pass recorded a jazz guitar instrumental cover for his holiday album, Six-String Santa.

In November and December 1993, Sears aired a "Home for the Holidays" ad campaign, using instrumental renditions of the song itself.

In January 2000, a Garth Brooks version, from Garth Brooks & the Magic of Christmas, reached No. 63 on Billboard's Hot Country Singles & Tracks chart.

In 2002, singer Barry Manilow released a version of the song on his Christmas album "A Christmas Gift of Love." Manilow's version was also included on the 2003 compilation album Now That's What I Call Christmas!: The Signature Collection.

In 2010, Mandy Barnett recorded the song for her holiday album, Winter Wonderland.

On December 1, 2011, Alfonso Gomez-Rejon directed about six singing and dancing mall performances of "Home for the Holidays" by Carly Foulkes and 100 Chicago-area women in magenta dresses at the Woodfield Mall. It was used in a television commercial for T-Mobile starting on December 12.

A 2011 duet between Cyndi Lauper and Norah Jones did well on the Billboard Adult Contemporary chart, peaking at No. 11 on the Adult Contemporary Radio Airplay Chart in the U.S.

Pentatonix covered the song for their 2021 Christmas album Evergreen.

== Charts ==
=== Weekly charts ===
==== Perry Como (1954) version ====
Chart (1954–1955)	Peak position
US Best Sellers in Stores (Billboard)	18
US Most Played by Jockeys (Billboard)	8

Chart (2012–2024)	Peak position
Global 200 (Billboard)	150
US Billboard Hot 100	50
US Holiday 100 (Billboard)	26

==== Perry Como (1959) version ====
Chart (2014–2022)	Peak position
Global 200 (Billboard)	55
US Billboard Hot 100	22
US Holiday 100 (Billboard)	13

==== The Carpenters version ====
Chart (2012–2016)	Peak position
US Holiday 100 (Billboard)	36

==== Garth Brooks version ====
Chart (1999–2000)	Peak position
US Hot Country Songs (Billboard)	63

==== Cyndi Lauper and Norah Jones version ====
Chart (2011–2012)	Peak position
US Adult Contemporary (Billboard)	11

=== All-time charts ===
==== Perry Como (1959) version ====
Chart (2011–2021)	Position
US Holiday 100 (Billboard)	40

== See also ==
- List of Christmas carols
