= My Little Angel =

"My Little Angel" is a popular song, published in 1956. "My Little Angel" was the flip side to "Standing on the Corner".

== Chart performance ==
The recording by The Four Lads (made February 29, 1956) was released by Columbia Records as catalog number 40674. It first reached the Billboard charts on April 28, 1956. On the Disk Jockey chart, it peaked at number 24; on the Best Seller chart, at number 22; and on the composite chart of the top 100 songs, it reached number 30.
