= There's Nothing I Can Say =

Single by Rick Nelson
- B-side: "Lonely Corner"
- Released: August 8, 1964
- Genre: Pop
- Length: 2:02
- Label: Decca Records 31656
- Songwriter(s): Christian Sarrel, Al Stillman

Rick Nelson singles chronology
"Lucky Star" (1964)	"There's Nothing I Can Say" (1964)	"A Happy Guy" (1964)

"There's Nothing I Can Say" is a song written by Christian Sarrel and Al Stillman and performed by Rick Nelson. The recording was produced and arranged by Jimmie Haskell.

The song reached No. 18 on the easy listening chart and No. 47 on the Billboard Hot 100 in 1964. The single's B-side, "Lonely Corner", reached #113 on the Billboard chart.
