= Enchanted Island (song) =

Single
- Published: 1958
- Composer(s): Robert Allen
- Lyricist(s): Al Stillman

"Enchanted Island" is a popular song, published in 1958, with music written by Robert Allen and lyrics by Al Stillman. The song was featured as the title song of producer Benedict Bogeaus' feature film Enchanted Island, starring Dana Andrews and Jane Powell, and performed on the soundtrack by The Four Lads.

The recording by The Four Lads (made February 16, 1958) was released by Columbia Records as catalog number 41194. It first reached the Billboard charts on July 14, 1958. On the Disk Jockey chart, it peaked at #12; on the Best Seller chart, at #32; on the composite chart of the top 100 songs, it reached #29. In Canada, the song reached #9 on the CHUM Charts.
