= There's Only One of You =

Single by The Four Lads and Ray Ellis and His Orchestra
- B-side: "Blue Tattoo"
- Released: March 1958
- Recorded: February 16, 1958
- Genre: pop
- Length: 2:53
- Label: Columbia
- Composer: Robert Allen
- Lyricist: Al Stillman

"There’s Only One of You" is a popular song with music written by Robert Allen and lyrics by Al Stillman. The song was published in 1958.

The song was one of a large number of Stillman-Allen compositions that were recorded by The Four Lads. This recording (made February 16, 1958) was released by Columbia Records as catalog number 41136. It first reached the Billboard charts on April 7, 1958. On the Disk Jockey chart, it peaked at #10; on the Best Seller chart, at #43; on the composite chart of the top 100 songs, it reached #41. In Canada, the song reached #19 on the CHUM Charts.
