= Dolores Hawkins =

American singer

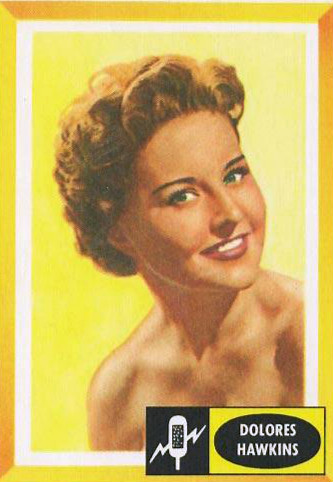
Hawkins in 1960.

Dolores Hawkins (September 22, 1929 – January 15, 1987) was an American rhythm & blues singer from Brooklyn, New York.

== Vocal career ==
She is remembered for her vocals that accompanied band leaders Gene Krupa and Red Saunders. She recorded "Heavenly Father"/"Rocks in My Bed" with The Four Lads in 1952. Walter Winchell mentioned the newcomer Hawkins in his column of March 25, 1953. He said that she was admired by female vocalists Gloria DeHaven and Monica Lewis during her performance at the Copacabana.

Hawkins released the single record "Scrap of Paper"/"I've Got A Letter", a 78 RPM, on OKeh Records in April 1953. The orchestra that accompanied her vocals was directed by Joe Reisman. In 1954 Hawkins recorded "George"/"Silly Man"' on Epic Records. Billboard Magazine commented that she sang the ballad pastiche "George" with "the coolness of an English Savoyard." She performed the title song for the 1956 film "A Kiss Before Dying" and in 1960, she sang two songs by Burton Lane and Alan Jay Lerner in MGM's remake of "The Adventures of Huckleberry Finn".

In November 1968 Hawkins performed in a "Cavalcade of Broadway" at Harry's American Showroom in Miami, Florida.
