= Frankie Laine and the Four Lads =

Frankie Laine and The Four Lads

Studio album by Frankie Laine and The Four Lads
- Released: 1958
- Genre: Christian
- Label: Columbia

Frankie Laine and The Four Lads chronology
Jazz Spectacular (1956)	Frankie Laine and The Four Lads (1958)	Rockin' (1957)

Professional ratings
Review scores
Source	Rating
Billboard	79/100

Frankie Laine and the Four Lads is an album recorded by Frankie Laine together with the group the Four Lads. It was released by Columbia Records sometime in the first half of 1956 when the Four Lads were flying high on the U.S. singles charts.

Laine and the Four Lads had already had a hit together — in 1954 with a song titled "Rain, Rain, Rain" that reached number 30 in the United States and number 8 in the UK. That song was among the 12 tracks selected for the album.

== Track listing ==
All tracks are written by Jay McConologue.

Side one
No.	Title	Length
1.	"Juba-Juba-Jubalee"	2:23
2.	"Where Can I Go"	3:35
3.	"What Would I Do (without the Lord)"	1:52
4.	"Let Me Be Ready, Lord"	3:50
5.	"Didn't He Moan"	2:17
6.	"I Feel Like My Time Ain't Long"	2:12

Side two
No.	Title	Length
1.	"Rain, Rain, Rain"	2:55
2.	"God's Gonna Take the Saints to Heaven"	3:09
3.	"Wa-Hoo"	2:29
4.	"Remember Me"	2:44
5.	"Ain't It a Pity and a Shame"	3:10
6.	"I Heard the Angels Singing"	2:21
