= Forever Plaid =

Off-Broadway musical revue

- Show logo
- Music: Various Artists
- Lyrics: Various Artists
- Book: Stuart Ross
- Productions: 1989 New York City

Forever Plaid is an Off-Broadway musical revue written by Stuart Ross, first performed in New York in 1989 and now performed internationally.

== Overview ==
The show is a revue of the close-harmony "guy groups" (e.g. The Four Aces, The Four Freshmen) that reached the height of their popularity during the 1950s. Personifying the clean-cut genre are the Plaids. This quartet of high-school chums had a dream of recording an album, which ended in death in a collision with a bus filled with Catholic schoolgirls on their way to see the Beatles' American debut on The Ed Sullivan Show. The revue begins with the Plaids returning from the afterlife for one final chance at musical glory.

The songs they sing during the course of the musical include: "Three Coins in the Fountain"; "Undecided"; "Gotta Be This or That"; "Moments to Remember"; "Crazy 'Bout Ya, Baby"; "No, Not Much"; "Sixteen Tons"; "Chain Gang"; "Perfidia"; "Cry"; "Heart and Soul"; "Lady of Spain"; "Scotland the Brave"; "Shangri-La"; "Rags to Riches"; and "Love is a Many-Splendored Thing".

== Productions ==
Stuart Ross explained the production history of the revue, stating that it was initially produced at the West Bank Cafe in 1987 featuring Rusty Magee, John DiPinto, Jonathan Long, and William Misnik as the Plaids. It then ran at the Eugene O'Neill Theater Center in Waterford, Connecticut and Downstairs Cabaret in Rochester, New York, where the revue was rewritten to have the members of the Plaids killed. The revue next ran at The American Stage Company at the Becton Theatre, Teaneck, New Jersey in December 1988 with Dirk Lumbard (Smudge), Don Kehr (Francis), John Caraccioli (Jinx) and Jason Graae (Sparky). The revue opened in New York in November 1989 at Steve McGraw's. The revue re-opened at McGraw's in May 1990 and closed on June 12, 1994.

The original 1989 New York cast was Stan Chandler, Guy Stroman, Gabriel Barre and Jason Graae. The original 1990 New York cast included Jason Graae (Sparky); Stan Chandler (Jinx); David Engel (Smudge); and Guy Stroman (Frankie).

Musical arrangements, vocal arrangements and musical direction were by James Raitt; the show was written, directed, and choreographed by Stuart Ross.

== Musical numbers ==
Act I

- Deus Ex Plaid - Plaids
- Three Coins in the Fountain - Frankie, Plaids
- Gotta Be This or That / Undecided - Plaids
- Moments to Remember - Plaids
- Crazy 'Bout Ya Baby - Frankie, Plaids
- No, Not Much - Jinx, Plaids
- Perfidia - Sparky, Plaids
- Cry - Jinx, Plaids
- Sixteen Tons / Chain Gang - Smudge, Frankie, Plaids
- Private Functions: The Bride Cuts the Cake / Italian Wedding / Anniversary Waltz / Itty Bitty Town of Bethlehem / Hava Nagila / Rock-a My Soul / She Loves You - Plaids
- The Golden Cardigan / Catch a Falling Star - Sparky, Plaids

Act 2

- Caribbean Plaid: Day-O / Kingston Market / Jamaica Farewell / Matilda Matilda - Jinx, Frankie, Plaids
- Heart and Soul - Frankie, Plaids
- Mercury / Lady of Spain - Jinx, Plaids
- Scotland the Brave - Plaids
- Shangri-La / Rags to Riches (samples "The Good, The Bad, and the Ugly") - Smudge, Plaids
- Love is a Many Splendored Thing - Plaids

== Motion picture ==
The play was produced as a motion picture (released on July 9, 2009) starring Chandler and Engel from the original cast, with Larry Raben and Daniel Reichard taking over for Sparky and Francis (Frankie), respectively. David Hyde Pierce guest stars as the narrator. David Snyder served as musical director and pianist. The movie was written and directed by the show's original creator, Stuart Ross, and edited by Oscar and Emmy winner Alan Helm. The performances of "The Golden Cardigan" and "Catch a Falling Star" are notably absent.

== Sequels ==
The Pasadena Playhouse and Neptune Theatre (Halifax), famous for its versions of the original, ran a sequel called Plaid Tidings, a holiday version with modified story and songs. The Pasadena engagement premiered in November 2001, and ran again in December 2002. The Los Angeles Times reviewer wrote that the musical is "enormously entertaining feel-good fare...Plaid Tidings, however, significantly expands upon the original model, its self-contained ethos of sunny homage augmented with flashes of pathos and larger point." Plaid Tidings made its New York City debut at the York Theatre Company at St. Peter's in December 2015.

It is available for licensing through Music Theatre International.

A version for high schools, The Sound of Plaid: Forever Plaid School Version, is being created by Music Theatre International.
