= On the Sunny Side (The Four Lads album) =

Studio album by The Four Lads
- Released: 1956
- Genre: Pop standard
- Label: Columbia

The Four Lads chronology
Moments to Remember (1955)	On the Sunny Side (1956)	The Four Lads Sing Frank Loesser (1957)

On the Sunny Side is an LP album by The Four Lads released by Columbia Records as catalog number CL 912 in 1956, containing mostly popular standard songs.

== Chart performance ==
On the Sunny Side debuted on Billboard magazine's Best-Selling Pop Albums chart in the issue dated October 6, 1956, peaking at No. 14 the following week. The album did much better on the Billboard Most Played by Jockeys chart, managing to reach and stay at No. 2 for two weeks. It marked their only charting album.

== Track listing ==
Track number	Song	Songwriter(s)	Length
1	On The Sunny Side Of The Street	Jimmy McHugh/Dorothy Fields	2:01
2	The Things We Did Last Summer	Jule Styne/Sammy Cahn	3:35
3	Taking A Chance On Love	Vernon Duke/John Latouche/Ted Fetter	2:08
4	Bidin' My Time	George Gershwin/Ira Gershwin	3:15
5	Makin' Whoopee	Walter Donaldson/Gus Kahn	2:37
6	Sentimental Journey	Les Brown/Ben Homer/Bud Green	2:56
7	These Foolish Things	Harry Link/Holt Marvell/Jack Strachey	3:32
8	Wrap Your Troubles In Dreams	Harry Barris/Ted Koehler/Billy Moll	2:27
9	Dancing In The Dark	Arthur Schwartz/Howard Dietz	3:01
10	Lazy River	Hoagy Carmichael/Sidney Arodin	2:26
11	The Way You Look Tonight	Jerome Kern/Dorothy Fields	3:23
12	Side By Side	Harry Woods/Gus Kahn	2:56

== Reissue ==
The album, combined with the Four Lads' 1958 album Breezin' Along, was reissued in compact disc form by Collectables Records on January 16, 2001.

== Charts ==
Chart peaks for On the Sunny Side
Chart (1956)	Peak position
US Billboard Best-Selling Pop Albums	14
US Billboard Most Played by Jockeys	2
