= Sunny Side of the Street =

Sunny Side of the Street may refer to:

- "Sunny Side of the Street" (song), a 1990 song by The Pogues
- Sunny Side of the Street (Bryn Haworth album), a 1975 album
- Sunny Side of the Street (film), a 1951 comedy film directed by Richard Quine
- The Sunny Side of the Street, a 2006 John Lithgow album
- The Sunny Side of the Street (film), a 2022 film directed by Lau Kok-rui
- Sunny Side of the Street, a painting by Philip Evergood
- "On the Sunny Side of the Street", a 1930 song and jazz standard written by Jimmy McHugh and Dorothy Fields
