= The Five Discs =

The Five Discs were an American doo-wop group from Brooklyn, New York, United States. In 1954, the Lovenotes, a six-man group (no recordings) with Mario deAndrade and Andy Jackson formed in Bedford-Stuyvesant, Brooklyn. Down the block, Joe Barsalona, Tony Basile, and Paul Albano were trying to put a group together and often Mario deAndrade would come down the block and coach them on singing harmony. After about six months the Lovenotes broke up, and Mario and Andy went down the block and started singing with Joe, Tony, and Paul. That was the beginning of what would eventually be called the Five Discs. Their first demo recording came in 1957, and they had regional hits in the northeast from 1958 through 1962, including "I Remember" (b/w "The World Is a Beautiful Place") in 1958 and "Never Let You Go" (b/w "That Was the Time") in 1962. The group reunited briefly in the early 1970s, and again in 1990. There are currently two Five Discs groups performing, each with an original recording member.

== Sources ==
- Bobby Diskin: "I was the manager of the Five Discs, starting in 1989, and interviewed all the members of the group."
