= Everything Goes (game show) =

American television program

- Also known as: (The All-New) Everything Goes
- Created by: Scott Sternberg
- Presented by: Kip Addotta
- Country of origin: United States

Production
- Running time: 30 minutes

Original release
- Network: Escapade (1981–1984); Playboy Channel (1984–1988)
- Release: September 12, 1981 – September 28, 1988

Everything Goes is a game show that aired in the US from 12 September 1981 to 28 September 1988, with comedian Kip Addotta as host. It originally aired on Escapade for its first three years, then moved to the Playboy Channel in 1984 (which aired reruns of those first three seasons, and produced new episodes under the title The All-New Everything Goes). The show was produced by Scott Sternberg Productions. It was described as a "sort of cross between Hollywood Squares and strip-poker".

The show's theme song was "Piccadilly" by Squeeze; while the open used only the instrumental open/close of the song (with a drumroll in between, to punctuate host Addotta's introduction), the full-length version was used during the closing credits.

== Gameplay ==
Two contestants, male and female, dressed in a different themed costume for each episode (Prom King/Queen, Cowboy/Cowgirl), along with Addotta and three celebrity panellists made up of popular TV personalities of the period.

Each panellist gave their own answer to a question asked by Addotta, and the contestant would have to agree or disagree with the celebrity (much like Hollywood Squares). If the contestant chose correctly, he or she could remove one item of clothing from the opposing player. If not, the contestant would have one of his/her own articles of clothing removed by the opponent. The contestants wore an equal number of items to be removed.

=== Special rounds ===
Midway through the game, one of two special rounds was used, depending on who was in the lead at the time: in one, three attractive, fully clothed women came out on stage, then disappeared behind a wall with strategically placed doors. Then, Kip would open three doors, revealing three pairs of bare breasts. The object was for the contestant to match the breasts to the correct clothed woman. A similar round for the female contestant involved her having to match three unclothed male posteriors to their rightful owners.

=== Final question ===
At the end of the game, one final question determined the outcome of the game. Whoever won that question won the game and a vacation or $1,000 cash plus the right to take off all of the other person's clothes (except his/her G-string).

== Home media ==
In 1985, a compilation of clips from the show's first two years – interspersed with monologue from Addotta – was released on VHS by Active Home Video as "The Best of Everything Goes". The release has been long out of print, and episodes of the series are highly sought after by enthusiasts.

This compilation also aired on the Playboy Channel during their run of the show.

== Reception ==
The show was poorly received, named the "worst show ever" by Howard Rosenberg of the Los Angeles Times. He went on to state, "the show is a combination of 'Hollywood Squares' and strip poker, with contestants betting items of clothing on celebrities' answers. Another commentator noted the show offered a "30 minute diversion" for viewers, and that while the show could not be "described as good, clean fun...it [did] have a sense of humour about it...[but] not the kind of program that makes for a meaningful relationship your TV set".
