= Al Stillman =

American lyricist (1901–1979)

- Born: Albert Irving Silverman; June 26, 1901; New York City, U.S.A.
- Died: February 17, 1979 (aged 77) New York City, U.S.A.
- Occupation: Lyricist

Al Stillman (born Albert Irving Silverman; 26 June 1901, Manhattan, New York – 17 February 1979, Manhattan, New York) was an American lyricist.

== Biography ==
Al Stillman was born Albert Irving Silverman to Jewish parents Herman Silverman and Gertrude Rubin. He adopted the name "Albert Stillman" as a professional pseudonym. He chose the name, reportedly, because it was the recognizable surname of a well-known New York banking family. He was Jewish. He attended New York University; after graduation, he contributed to Franklin P. Adams's newspaper column, and in 1933, became a staff writer at Radio City Music Hall, a position he held for almost 40 years.

Stillman collaborated with a number of composers, including Fred Ahlert, Robert Allen, Percy Faith, George Gershwin, Ernesto Lecuona, Paul McGrane, Kay Swift, and Arthur Schwartz. Many of his collaborations with Allen were major hits in the 1950s for the Four Lads; the Stillman–Allen team also wrote hit songs for Perry Como and Johnny Mathis.

Stillman was inducted into the Songwriters Hall of Fame in 1982.

== Songs for which Stillman wrote lyrics ==
=== Music by Robert Allen ===
Perry Como hits

- "Home for the Holidays" (1954) (Still played during the Christmas holiday.)
- "My One and Only Heart" (1953)
- "You Alone (Solo Tu)" (1953, redone in 1961)

The Four Lads hits

- "Enchanted Island" (1958)
- "Moments to Remember" (1955)
- "No, Not Much" (1956)
- "There’s Only One of You" (1958)
- "Who Needs You?" (1956)

Johnny Mathis hits

- "Chances Are" (1957)
- "It's Not For Me to Say" (1957)
- "Teacher, Teacher" (1958)
- "Every Step of the Way" (1960)

=== Music by Ernesto Lecuona ===
- "The Breeze and I" (1940)
- "Say 'Si Si'" (co-written with Francia Luban)
- "You're the One", as recorded by Kathy Kirby in 1964

=== Others ===
- "Air Cadet Song" (music by Louis E.De Francesco, 1944 (published by Sam Fox Pub Co. NY NY)
- "Alley Cat" (music by Bent Fabric)
- "And That Reminds Me" (or "My Heart Reminds Me") (written with Camillo Bargoni, Dante Panzuti, and Paul Siegel.) (A hit for singers Vikki Carr, Kay Starr, Julie London, Della Reese, Dean Martin, among others.)
- "Bless 'em All" (with Fred Godfrey, Frank Kerslake, and James Lally) (a World War II song)
- "Can You Find It in Your Heart?"
- "Don'cha Go 'Way Mad" (music by Illinois Jacquet and Jimmy Mundy.) (A hit for Frank Sinatra.)
- "The Great Escape March"
- "Happy Anniversary"
- "I Believe" (1952) (written with Ervin Drake, Irvin Graham and Jimmy Shirl) (a hit for Jane Froman, Frankie Laine, and recorded by many others, including Perry Como, Barbra Streisand, Cissy Houston, and Elvis Presley.)
- "If Dreams Come True"
- "I Love You and Don’t You Forget It" (1963) (music by Henry Mancini) (A hit for Perry Como.)
- "Jukebox Saturday Night" (1942) (music by Paul McGrane) (A hit for the Glenn Miller Orchestra and the Pied Pipers vocal group.)
- "The Little Boy"
- "Little Jack Frost Get Lost" (written with Seger Ellis [1904-95])
- "Mama Yo Quiero" (written with Jararaca and Vincente Paiva.) (A hit for the Xavier Cugat Orchestra and others.)
- "Meantime"
- "An Old Flame Never Dies"
- "One, Two, Three, Kick"
- "A Room with a View"
- "Song About Love"
- "Taboo"
- "Tell Me That You Love Me Tonight"
- "There's Nothing I Can Say"
- "Truly, Truly True"
- "When I Am With You", (music by Benjamin Weisman) (A hit for Johnny Mathis.)
- "You and I Know"
- "Turn Off the Moon" (sung by Sue Lyon, music by Bob Harris.)
- "Copacabana"
- "The Way of Love" (A hit for Cher) (English lyric to song by French composers Jacques ("Jack") Dieval and Michel Rivgauche.)

== Stage shows with scores by Stillman ==
- Howdy
- Icetime of 1948
- It Happens on Ice
- Mr. Ice
- Stars on Ice
- Virginia

== Movies to which Stillman contributed songs ==
- The Cardinal
- Captains of the Clouds (1942) (Was uncredited, but wrote the song "Bless Em All")
- Carnival in Costa Rica (1947) (Wrote the songs "Costa Rica" and "Say Si Si")
- I'll Cry Tomorrow (1955) (Film used his song "Cui Cui," originally written for The Long, Long Trailer.)
- Lizzie (1957) (Composed the song "It's Not For Me To Say")
- The Long, Long Trailer (1954) (Composed the song "Cui Cui")
- The FBI Story (1959) (Composed the song "What Do I Care?")

== Marriage ==
Stillman, on September 29, 1939, married Pauline Reinfmann (née Patia Reinfmann aka Kaufman in Fort Lee, New Jersey. She was born in Russia and became a U.S. naturalized citizen March 22, 1943.
