= Standing on the Corner (show tune) =

Song performed by The Four Lads

Single by The Four Lads
- B-side: "My Little Angel"
- Published: 1956
- Released: March 19, 1956
- Recorded: March 1, 1956
- Genre: Traditional pop
- Length: 2:51
- Label: Columbia
- Songwriter: Frank Loesser

"Standing on the Corner" is a popular song written by Frank Loesser and published in 1956. It was introduced by Shorty Long, Alan Gilbert, John Henson, and Roy Lazarus in the Broadway musical, The Most Happy Fella.

A recording of it by the Four Lads (made March 1, 1956) was popular in 1956. It was released by Columbia Records as catalog number 40674. It first reached the Billboard charts on April 28, 1956, and peaked at No. 3 on each of the various charts at the time: the Disk Jockey chart, the Best Seller chart, the Juke Box chart, as well as the composite chart of the top 100 songs. The flip side was "My Little Angel". Jimmy Arnold, lead tenor for The Four Lads in 1956, is sometimes erroneously listed as the song's co-author.

== Other recordings ==
- Dean Martin also released a version in 1956, which reached No. 22 on Billboard's chart of Most Played by Jockeys and No. 29 on Billboard's Top 100 chart.
- A version by The King Brothers became popular in the United Kingdom in 1960, reaching No. 4 in the UK Singles Chart, when the musical was staged in London's West End, and the Four Lads' version also made the lower reaches of the UK chart at this point.
- On February 9, 2010, the Irish group Celtic Thunder released their fourth album, entitled It's Entertainment. This album, meant to pay homage to past musical styles, features their youngest member Damian McGinty singing "Standing on the Corner". Celtic Thunder's DVD of the same title features McGinty dressed in a sweater and cabbie performing the number.
