= Everything Goes!!! =

Studio album by The Four Lads
- Released: 1960
- Genre: Traditional pop
- Label: Columbia

Everything Goes!!! is an LP album by The Four Lads, released by Columbia Records in 1960.

== Track listing ==
Track number	Title	Songwriter(s)
1	All of You	Cole Porter
2	It's All Right with Me	Cole Porter
3	It Had to Be You	Isham Jones/Gus Kahn
4	The Party's Over	Jule Styne/Betty Comden/Adolph Green
5	Ac-Cent-Tchu-Ate the Positive	Harold Arlen/Johnny Mercer
6	Honeysuckle Rose	Fats Waller/Andy Razaf
7	Some of These Days	Shelton Brooks
8	Anything Goes	Cole Porter
9	You're Nobody till Somebody Loves You	Russ Morgan/Larry Stock/James Cavanaugh
10	I'm Gonna Sit Right Down and Cry (Over You)	Joe Thomas, Howard Biggs.
11	Nobody	Alex Rogers/Bert Williams
12	Ace in the Hole	Cole Porter

The album was reissued, combined with the 1959 album Swing Along, on CD by Collectables Records on July 31, 2001.
