= Tina Marie =

1955 popular song

Single by Perry Como
- B-side: "Fooled"
- Released: July 1955
- Recorded: June 21, 1955
- Genre: Traditional pop
- Length: 2:33
- Label: RCA Victor
- Songwriter: Bob Merrill
- Producer: Joe Carlton

"Tina Marie" is a popular song. It was written by Bob Merrill and was published in 1955, and performed by Perry Como with an accompaniment with Mitchell Ayres and His Orchestra with The Ray Charles Singers.

== Recordings ==
On June 21, 1955, Perry Como recorded the song for RCA Victor.The recording was released on a number of singles:

- In the United States, by RCA Victor, as a 78 rpm single (catalog number 20-6192), and a 45 rpm single (catalog number 47-6192), with the flip side "Fooled."
- In the United States, as a children's record by RCA Victor, as a 78 rpm single (catalog number BY-50), and a 45 rpm single (catalog number WBY-50), with the flip side "Round and Round," part of the Children's Bluebird Series
- In Belgium, by RCA as a single (catalog number 18313), with the flip side "Fooled."
- In the United Kingdom, by His Master's Voice, in October 1955, as a 78 rpm single (catalog number POP-103), with the flip side "Home for the Holidays." This record reached position number 24 on the UK chart. (A pirate version was issued by His Master's Voice as a 45 rpm single under the catalog number 7M-326.)
- In Australia, The Book - Top 40 Research, 7th edition compiled by Barnes & Scanes, gives that Tina Marie was never released as a single in Australia. The same publication then goes on to show Tina Marie achieving Number 8 on the Australian music charts on January 21, 1956.

== Chart performance ==
In the US, "Tina Marie" reached position number 5 on the Billboard chart.
