= Moments to Remember =

Single by The Four Lads
- A-side: "Dream On, My Love, Dream On"
- Released: July 18, 1955
- Recorded: June 21, 1955
- Genre: Traditional pop
- Length: 3:10
- Label: Columbia
- Composers: Robert Allen, Al Stillman
- Producer: Ray Ellis

The Four Lads singles chronology
"Too Much! Baby, Baby" (1955)	"Moments to Remember" (1955)	"I Heard the Angels Singing" (1955)

"Moments to Remember" is a 1955 popular song about nostalgia recorded by Canadian quartet The Four Lads. The song was originally written by Robert Allen and Al Stillman for Perry Como but was turned down by Como's management.

== The Four Lads recording ==
The Four Lads recorded it in June 1955 for Columbia Records as the B side to the single "Dream On, My Love, Dream On." Bernie Toorish of the Four Lads credited the enthusiastic endorsement of Cleveland radio DJ Bill Randle for increasing radio airtime play and popularizing the recording. It eventually reached number 2 on Billboard magazine's Top 100 hit list (an early version of the Hot 100), sold 4 million copies and became the group's first gold record.

Besides the voices of the male quartet, the song also contains two uncredited female parts. According to the Four Lads' Frank Busseri, the introductory verse ("January through December/We'll have moments to remember"), as well as the repeat of the Bridge section in harmony ("When summer turns to winter"), were sung by Lois Winters of the Ray Charles Singers and the poetic spoken words in mid-song: ("A drive-in movie/Where we'd go/And somehow never watched the show/") were recited by Pat Kirby who at that time was a singer on Steve Allen's television show Tonight!.

== Other noted versions ==
- Bing Crosby recorded the song on November 23, 1955, with Buddy Cole and His Orchestra.
- Louis Armstrong - a single release (1955).
- Ronnie Hilton with orchestra conducted by Frank Cordell recorded "Moments to Remember" in London on December 13, 1955, and released it on His Master's Voice POP-154 (78 rpm record) and 7M 358 (single).
- The American vocal group Deep River Boys Featuring Harry Douglas with Pete Brown's orchestra recorded it in Oslo on August 30, 1956. It was released on the 78 rpm record His Master's Voice AL 6037.
- The song was recorded by both the Statler Brothers and the Vogues in 1969, inciting a minor cover remake battle against the Buddah Records version by the Smoke Ring.
- The Norman Luboff Choir - on the album Moments to Remember (1960) Columbia CL-1423/CS-8220
- The musical Forever Plaid includes their cover of the song.
- Anne Murray recorded a version of the song for her album Croonin' (1993).

== Popular culture ==
- The song was featured as part of the theme music of XM Satellite Radio's "Moments to Remember", a weekly two-hour program written, produced, and hosted by Bob Moke on the '50s channel. The program aired from July 2006 through February 2009, and focused on standard pop music of the early to mid-Fifties.
