= The Turbans =

American doo-wop vocal group

- Origin: Philadelphia, Pennsylvania, United States
- Genres: Doo-wop, R&B
- Occupation: Vocal group
- Years active: 1953–1962
- Labels: Herald, Red Top, Roulette, Parkway
- Past members: Al Banks; Matthew Platt; Charlie Williams; Andrew "Chet" Jones; Earl Worsham; John Christian; Reggie "Tootie" Price; James Oscar "Cisco" Williams; William "Sonny" Gordon

The Turbans were an American doo-wop vocal group that formed in Philadelphia, Pennsylvania in 1953. The original members were: Al Banks (lead tenor), Matthew Platt (second tenor), Charlie Williams (baritone), and Andrew "Chet" Jones (bass). They came from Downtown Philadelphia (around Bainbridge and South Street).

Around Christmas of 1954, they won first prize in a talent contest singing their rendition of "White Christmas". This created interest among the local record companies, and in the late spring of 1955, they cut a demo record. Herman Gillespie, the group's first manager, took the demo record to Al Silver at Herald Records in New York City. They signed a contract in July 1955, and gained a new manager, Allen Best. Best worked for Shaw Artists Corporation.

== "When You Dance" ==
During July 1955, the Turbans had their first Herald recording session, and later that month their first record, pairing "Let Me Show You (Around My Heart)" as the "A" side with "When You Dance" as the flip side, was released. Although "Let Me Show You" became a regional hit in Atlanta, Cleveland Pittsburgh, Detroit, Boston, and New Orleans, interest began to grow in "When You Dance". At first it started to break in New York City, Philadelphia, Washington D.C. and Baltimore, until finally, in November, it hit the national R&B and Pop charts. "When You Dance" reached No. 3 on the R&B chart, and remained there for about two months. It only rose to No. 33 on the pop chart, but stayed there for about five months, so it was counted as a significant hit.

== Late 1955–early 1956 ==
In December 1955, Herald Records released "Sister Sooky/I’ll Always Watch Over You" as a follow-up record, but this failed to chart. With one national hit, however, in late January 1956, they went on a tour, joining Irvin Feld’s "Super Attractions Tour". Then in March 1956, they joined another tour, which featured Roy Gaines, Guitar Slim, Margie Day, and Lloyd Lambert.

They then became part of the "Rhythm And Blues Show Of 1956" and in April 1956, "I’m Nobody’s"/"B-I-N-G-O" was released, but this did not make the national charts. By July, they were touring the Midwest with Sonny Boy Williamson’s orchestra. In August 1956, "It Was A Night Like This"/"All Of My Love" was released, but this record also failed to make the national charts. Finally, on October 21, they played the Circle Theater in Cleveland, with Don Rello, the Quails and Ralph Wilson's orchestra.

== 1957 ==
As 1957 dawned, with no more hit records, the Turbans were running out of work. They were back in the studio in early 1957, but two more sessions failed to produce any hit records. By July 1957, their contract with Herald Records expired. This lack of success led to personnel changes, some of which were temporary, some of which were permanent.

== Red Top records ==
In late 1958, the now-reconstructed Turbans signed with Red Top Records. Matthew Platt and Charlie Williams had been replaced by Earl Worsham (first and second tenor) and John Christian (baritone/second tenor), both of whom had sung with the Quadrells. They released a single called "I Promise You"/"Curfew Time." Again, both sides were led by Banks. This record failed to chart, so the Turbans did no further recording for about two years. Jones left the group for a while, and they continued on as a trio.

== Early 1960s and Roulette records ==
In 1960, they moved to Morris Levy’s Roulette Records. Jones returned, and they recorded "Diamonds And Pearls," backed with "Bad Man". It was a group called the Paradons, though, who had a hit with the song. In January 1961, their second (and final) Roulette release was "Three Friends" (written by Burt Bacharach and Hal David), backed with "I’m Not Your Fool Anymore". This again failed to chart.

== Parkway records ==
The next stop for the Turbans was Bernie Lowe’s and Kal Mann’s Parkway Records. By this time, Jones, one of the mainstays of the group, had departed. The group was now Al Banks, Earl Worsham, John Christian, and newly-added bass, Reggie "Tootie" Price. At Parkway, they recorded an updated version of "When You Dance," released in February 1961 to compete with the re-released original Herald version.

In the spring of 1960, the original Herald version of "When You Dance" had been included on the second volume of Art Laboe’s "Oldies But Goodies" album series. It created enough demand for Herald to re-release the original single in February 1961. It was not a big hit the second time around, but it still managed to struggle to No. 114 on the Pop charts.

== Imperial records ==
Later in 1961, with no chart success at Parkway Records, they signed with Imperial Records. Price left, and was replaced by James Oscar "Cisco" Williams, (a bass/baritone/tenor), who had also been with the Quadrells. The group was now a quintet, with the fifth member being tenor William "Sonny" Gordon, who had been the lead of the Angels in 1954.

Their first Imperial release was "Six Questions" (led by Banks), backed with "The Lament Of Silver Gulch". In March 1962, there was a second Imperial release, "This Is My Story"/"Clicky Clicky Clack," both sides featuring Banks. The final Turbans’ record appeared in May 1962: "I Wonder"/"The Damage Is Done," with Sonny Gordon taking the lead on both sides. None of these three releases charted.

== The Turbans break up ==
After Imperial, the Turbans broke up for good. Worsham went off to Billy Byrd's Ink Spots, and then he sang with a Coasters group based in Boca Raton. Banks was with Charlie Thomas' Drifters in the early 1970s.

Andrew "Al" Banks died in July 1977.

William "Sonny" Gordon died on January 2, 1986.

John Christian died in 1996.

Andrew "Chet" Jones died on June 25, 1998.

Earl Worsham died on June 20, 2007.

== Discography ==
Singles under Herald label

- "When You Dance" (1955)
- "Sister Sookey" (1955)
- "B-I-N-G-O (Bingo)" (1956) – a doo-wop song written by Robert Riley, based on the Bingo (U.S.) game, 1956, also sung by Pat Boone
- "I'm Nobody's" (1956)
- "It was a Nite Like This" (1956)
- "Valley of Love" (1957)
- "Congratulations" (1957)
- "When You Dance" (1961)

Singles under other labels

- "Promise You Love" (Red Top, 1958)
- "Diamonds and Pearls" (Roulette, 1960)
- "Three Friends" (Roulette, 1961)
- "Golden Rings" (Parkway, 1961)
- "Six Questions" (Imperial, 1961)
- "This Is My Story" (Imperial, 1962)
- "I Wonder" (Imperial, 1962)

Compilation albums
