= Who Needs You? =

- by Robert Allen
- Text: by Al Stillman
- Published: 1956

"Who Needs You?" is a popular song with music by Robert Allen and lyrics by Al Stillman. It was published in 1956.

== Background and chart performance ==
The song was one of a large number of Stillman-Allen compositions recorded by The Four Lads. This recording was released by Columbia Records as catalog number 40811. It first reached the Billboard charts on February 2, 1957. On the Disk Jockey chart, it peaked at number 9; on the Best Seller chart, at number 13; on the Juke Box chart, at number 17; and on the composite chart of the top 100 songs, it reached number 14.

== Cover versions ==
- The song was covered by Petula Clark.
