= No, Not Much =

Song by Robert Allen Deitcher and Al Stillman

"No, Not Much" is a popular song published in 1955. The music was written by Robert Allen Deitcher, the lyrics by Al Stillman. The most popular version was recorded by The Four Lads. It was one of a large number of Stillman-Allen compositions that were recorded by the quartet.

== Background ==
The song is an ironic protestation of love, in which the lover rhetorically denies his devotion, but then continually undercuts and enfeebles the denial, until the exact opposite is conveyed.

== The Four Lads recording ==
- The recording by The Four Lads was released by Columbia Records as catalog number 40629. It first reached the Billboard magazine charts on January 28, 1956. On the Disk Jockey chart it peaked at No. 2; on the Best Seller chart, at No. 4; on the Juke Box chart, at No. 4; on the composite chart of the top 100 songs, it reached No. 3. It became a gold record.

== Cover versions ==
- Bing Crosby recorded the song in 1956 for use on his radio show and it was subsequently included in the box set The Bing Crosby CBS Radio Recordings (1954-56) issued by Mosaic Records (catalog MD7-245) in 2009.
- In 1969, the song was recorded by The Vogues. In the Vogues' version the lyric line: "Like a ten-cent soda doesn't cost a dime", was replaced by: "Like the song I'm singing doesn't mean a rhyme," because the former line was considered outdated.
- Also in 1969, The Smoke Ring recorded their version.
- Both of these versions, recorded in 1969, charted on the US Easy Listening and Hot 100 chart. In both renditions, the first two lines of the second verse are omitted and replaced by an instrumental.
- British singer Robert Palmer also recorded it for his 1992 studio album 'Ridin' High'.

== In popular culture ==
- This song also appeared in an episode of the TV show Scrubs. It was sung by Ted Buckland's hospital employee a capella band "The Worthless Peons" in the 4th-season episode "My Ocardial Infarction".
- It is also one of the songs of its era included in the Broadway musical Forever Plaid.
