= The Four Lads =

Canadian male quartet (1950–2018)

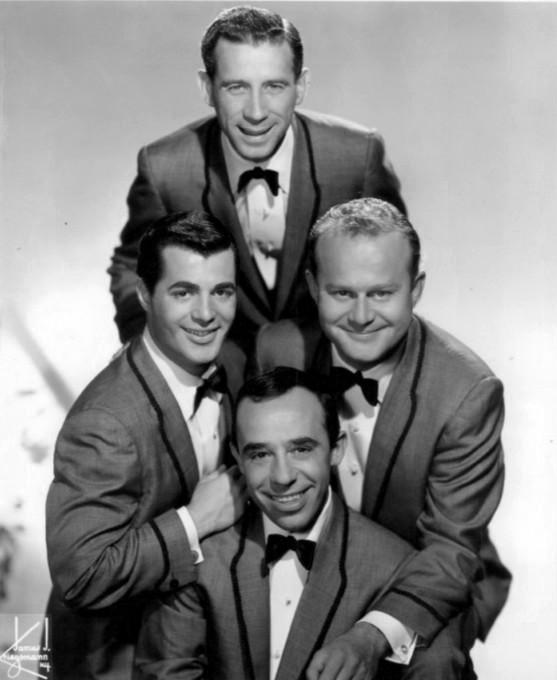
- Publicity photo of the group in May 1969

Background information
- Origin: Toronto, Ontario, Canada
- Genre: Traditional pop
- Years active: 1950–2018
- Labels: Okeh; Columbia; Kapp; Dot; United Artists
- Past members: Don Farrar; Aaron Bruce; Alan Sokoloff; Frank Busseri; Connie Codarini; Bernie Toorish; James F. "Jimmy" Arnold; Sid Edwards; Johnny D'Arc

The Four Lads were a Canadian male singing quartet that earned many gold singles and albums in the 1950s, 1960s, and 1970s. Their million-selling signature tunes include "Moments to Remember"; "Standing on the Corner"; "No, Not Much"; "Who Needs You?" and "Istanbul (Not Constantinople)".

The Four Lads appeared on many television shows including The Pat Boone Chevy Showroom (1958); Perry Como's show Perry Presents (1959); Frankie Laine Time (1956); and the award-winning PBS special, Moments to Remember: My Music. The most recent incarnation of the group featured lead tenor Don Farrar, second tenor Aaron Bruce, baritone Alan Sokoloff, and bass singer Frank Busseri.

The original quartet grew up together in Toronto, where they learned to sing at St. Michael's Choir School. The founding and core members were Corrado "Connie" Codarini, bass; John Bernard "Bernie" Toorish, tenor and vocal arranger; James F. "Jimmy" Arnold, lead; and Frank "Frankie" Busseri, baritone and group manager. Codarini and Toorish had formed a group with two other St. Michael's students, Rudi Maugeri and John Perkins, who later began The Crew-Cuts.

== History ==
The group was known variously as The Otnorots ("Toronto" spelled backwards) and The Jordonaires (not to be confused with The Jordanaires who sang background vocals on Elvis Presley's hits). When Maugeri and Perkins left the group to concentrate on their schoolwork, Codarini and Toorish joined with Arnold and Busseri in a new quartet. At home, they practiced until they achieved their clean-cut harmonies, whether for spirituals, sacred music, or pop. They originally called themselves "The Four Dukes", but found out that a Detroit group already used the name, so they changed it to The Four Lads. In 1950, they began to sing in local clubs and soon were noticed by scouts. Recruited to go to Manhattan, New York, they were noticed there by Mitch Miller, the artists and repertoire man at Columbia Records, who asked them to sing backup for some of the artists he recorded. One of those artists, Johnnie Ray, became a major hit in 1951 with "Cry" and "The Little White Cloud That Cried", with the Four Lads backing him.

After the success of Ray's first hit songs, the Four Lads signed a recording contract with Columbia. In early 1952, they recorded their first song, "Turn Back", penned by group member Bernie Toorish under the name "Dazz Jordan". Released by Columbia subsidiary Okeh Records (Okeh 6860), the song failed to make an impression. Sometime later that year, the group scored their first-ever hit record with "The Mocking Bird" (Okeh 6885), another Toorish composition. Based on a melody from the second movement of Antonin Dvorak's Symphony No. 9 (known as the "New World Symphony") and featuring an extremely limited accompaniment of percussion and bass, "The Mocking Bird" peaked at No. 23 on the Billboard pop chart. The Four Lads were quickly switched over to the Columbia label, where they continued to garner more hits, and stayed there until 1960.

In 1953, the Four Lads had their first gold record, with "Istanbul (Not Constantinople)", a song that gave them their first U.S. top-ten hit and propelled them to even more stardom. The group's most famous hit was 1955's "Moments to Remember." Another famous hit was "Standing on the Corner", from the Broadway musical The Most Happy Fella, in 1956. A gospel album with Frankie Laine took them back to their roots and produced the hit single "Rain, Rain, Rain", written by Toorish under the pseudonym "Jay McConologue". The Four Lads' Columbia recordings have seen releases and reissues on numerous studio albums and compilations over the years. In late 1958, the group's re-recording of "The Mocking Bird" became their last Top 40 pop hit. In 1959, their final pop chart appearance was with "Happy Anniversary", a song from the movie of the same name that peaked at No. 77. When their Columbia contract expired in 1960, the group spent the rest of the 1960s recording for the Kapp Records, Dot Records and United Artists Records labels without ever hitting the charts again.

Codarini was replaced in 1962 by Johnny D'Arc (who remained with the Lads until 1982) and later fell into destitution. As Toorish once recalled, "[Connie] made a terrible mistake. [He] married a model. [She] drove him crazy. He was working in a restaurant for a while." Toorish, who was burned out after twenty years of performing, was replaced by Sid Edwards in the early 1970s and became an insurance businessman. Arnold left the group in 1980 to become a voice teacher in Sacramento, California. Busseri remained with the group, and performed regularly with various members until late 2018.

Johnny D'Arc died in 1999, at 60, in Riverside, California. Jimmy Arnold died in 2004, aged 72, in Sacramento, California. Codarini died on April 28, 2010, in Concord, North Carolina, aged 80. Frank Busseri died in Rancho Mirage, California, on January 28, 2019, aged 86. Aaron Bruce (Aaron Bruce Grattidge), who was working as a radio DJ between performances, died in Topeka, Kansas, in August 2020, at the age of 79. Bernie Toorish died in North Olmsted, Ohio, on December 7, 2025, at the age of 94.

== Awards and honours ==
In 1984, the Four Lads were inducted into the Canadian Music Hall of Fame by the Canadian Academy of Recording Arts and Sciences (CARAS). They were inducted into the Vocal Group Hall of Fame in 2003.

== Gold singles ==
- "Istanbul (Not Constantinople)" (recorded August 12, 1953)
- "Moments to Remember" (recorded June 21, 1955)
- "No, Not Much" (recorded November 16, 1955)
- "Standing on the Corner" (recorded March 1, 1956)
- "Who Needs You?" (recorded October 18, 1956)

== Singles discography ==
Year	Titles (A-side, B-side) Both sides from same album except where indicated	Chart positions					Album
Year	Titles (A-side, B-side) Both sides from same album except where indicated	US	CB	US AC	CAN	^{UK}	Album
1952	"Turn Back" b/w "Tired of Loving You"						Non-album tracks
1952	"Mountains in the Moonlight" b/w "What's the Use" (Both tracks with Johnnie Ray)						Non-album tracks
1952	"Rocks in My Bed" b/w "Heavenly Father" (Both tracks with Dolores Hawkins)						Non-album tracks
1952	"The Mocking Bird" b/w "I May Hate Myself in the Morning" (Non-album track)	23					The Four Lads' Greatest Hits
1952	"Each Time" b/w "Risin' Sun" (Both tracks with Dolores Hawkins)						Non-album tracks
1952	"Somebody Loves Me" b/w "Thanks to You"	22					Non-album tracks
1952	"Faith Can Move Mountains" b/w "Love Me (Baby' Can't You Love Me) (Both tracks with Johnnie Ray)					7	Non-album tracks
1952	"Blackberry Boogie" b/w "The Girl on the Shore"						Non-album tracks
1953	"He Who Has Love" b/w "I Wonder, I Wonder, I Wonder"	16					Non-album tracks
1953	"Down by the Riverside" b/w "Take Me Back" (Non-album track)	17	29				The Four Lads' Greatest Hits
1953	"All I Desire" b/w "Lovers' Waltz" (Both tracks with Toni Arden)						Non-album tracks
1953	"I Love You" b/w "900 Miles (From My Home)" (Both tracks with Brock Peters)						Non-album tracks
1953	"I Should Have Told You Long Ago" /	26					Non-album tracks
1953	"Istanbul (Not Constantinople)"	10	5				The Four Lads' Greatest Hits
1954	"Harmony Brown" b/w "Gotta Go to the Fais Do Do"		27				Non-album tracks
1954	"Long John" b/w "The Place Where I Worship"						Non-album tracks
1954	"Cleo and Meo" b/w "Do You Know What Lips Are For?" (Both tracks with Jill Corey)		34				Non-album tracks
1954	"Oh, That'll Be Joyful" b/w "What Can I Lose (By Letting You Know I Love You)"	30	36				Non-album tracks
1954	"Gilly Gilly Ossenfeffer Katzenellen Bogen by the Sea" b/w "I Hear It Everywhere" (Non-album track)	18	28				The Four Lads' Greatest Hits
1954	"Skokiaan" b/w "Why Should I Love You"	7	2				Non-album tracks
1954	"Rain, Rain, Rain" (with Frankie Laine) b/w "Your Heart - My Heart" (by Frankie Laine, non-album track)	21	18			8	Frankie Laine and The Four Lads
1954	"Two Ladies in De Shade of De Banana Tree" b/w "Dance Calinda"						Non-album tracks
1955	"I've Been Thinking" b/w "Pledging My Love"		33				Non-album tracks
1955	"Too Much! Baby, Baby" b/w "The Average Giraffe"						Non-album tracks
1955	"Moments to Remember" b/w "Dream On, My Love Dream On" (Non-album track)	2	3				The Four Lads' Greatest Hits
1955	"I Heard the Angels Singing" b/w "Ain't It a Pity and a Shame" (Both tracks with Frankie Laine)						Frankie Laine and The Four Lads
1956	"No, Not Much!" /	2	3				The Four Lads' Greatest Hits
1956	"I'll Never Know"	52					Non-album track
1956	"Standing on the Corner" /	3	4			34	The Four Lads' Greatest Hits
1956	"My Little Angel"	22	16				Non-album track
1956	"The Mocking Bird" b/w "I May Hate Myself in the Morning" (Non-album track) (Reissue)	67					The Four Lads' Greatest Hits
1956	"The Bus Stop Song" /	17	18				The Four Lads' Greatest Hits
1956	"A House with Love in It"	16	20				Non-album tracks
1956	"The Stingiest Man in Town" b/w "Mary's Little Boy Chile"						Non-album tracks
1957	"Who Needs You?" b/w "It's So Easy to Forget" (Non-album track)	9	9				The Four Lads' Greatest Hits
1957	"I Just Don't Know" b/w "Golly"	17	28		25		Non-album tracks
1957	"The Eyes of God" b/w "His Invisible Hand"		49				Non-album tracks
1957	"Put a Light in the Window" b/w "The Things We Did Last Summer" (from On the Sunny Side)	8	22		4		The Four Lads' Greatest Hits
1958	"There's Only One of You" b/w "Blue Tattoo" (Non-album track)	10	13		19		The Four Lads' Greatest Hits
1958	"Enchanted Island" b/w "Guess What the Neighbors'll Say" (Non-album track)	12	12		9		The Four Lads' Greatest Hits
1958	"The Mocking Bird" (new version) b/w "Won'cha (Give Me Somethin' in Return)"	32	45		30		Non-album tracks
1959	"The Girl on Page 44" b/w "Sunday"	52	31				Non-album tracks
1959	"The Fountain of Youth" b/w "Meet Me Tonight in Dreamland" (from Swing Along)	90	76				Non-album tracks
1959	"Together Wherever We Go" b/w "The Chosen Few"						Non-album tracks
1959	"Got a Locket in My Pocket" b/w "The Real Thing"						Non-album tracks
1959	"Happy Anniversary" b/w "Who Do You Think You Are"	77	34				Non-album tracks
1960	"You're Nobody 'Til Somebody Loves You" b/w "Goona Goona"						Non-album tracks
1960	"Our Lady of Fatima" b/w "Our Lady of Fatima" (With poem by Samuel Lewis)						Non-album tracks
1960	"Two Other People" b/w "The Sheik of Chicago (Mustafa)"						Non-album tracks
1960	"Just Young" b/w "Goodbye Mr. Love"						Non-album tracks
1961	"I Should Know Better" b/w "555 Times"						Non-album tracks
1962	"Don't Fly Away Flamingo" b/w "Winter Snow"						Non-album tracks
1962	"Never on Sunday" b/w "Exodus"						Hits of the 60's
1962	"Sweet Mama Tree Top Tall" b/w "That's What I Like"						Oh, Happy Day
1962	"Beyond My Heart (I Couldn't See)" b/w "Not That I Care"						Non-album tracks
1963	"My Home Town" b/w "Cornflower Blue"						Non-album tracks
1963	"It's a Mad, Mad, Mad, Mad World" b/w "The Stolen Hours"						This Year's Top Movie Songs
1964	"The Love Song of Tom Jones" b/w "Theme from 'Lillies of the Field' (Amen)"						This Year's Top Movie Songs
1964	"Memories of You" b/w "Always Thinking of the Roses"						Non-album tracks
1965	"Thanks Mr. Florist" b/w "Barabanchik"		126				Non-album tracks
1965	"With My Eyes Open" b/w "I'm Not a Run Around"						Non-album tracks
1965	"All the Winds" b/w "Give Her My Love"						Non-album tracks
1966	"Standing on the Corner" b/w "No Not Much" (Both tracks are re-recorded versions)						Non-album tracks
1968	"A Woman" b/w "Where Do I Go"			26			Non-album tracks
1969	"Free Again" b/w "Moments To Remember" (new version)						Non-album tracks
1969	"My Heart's Symphony" b/w "Pardon Me Miss"			38			Non-album tracks

== Studio and compilation albums ==
Studio albums

Columbia Records

- The 4 Lads Stage Show (CL 6329, 1954)
- Frankie Laine and the Four Lads (with Frankie Laine) (CL 861)
- On the Sunny Side (with Claude Thornhill and his orchestra) (CL 912, 1956)
- The Four Lads Sing Frank Loesser (with Ray Ellis and his orchestra) (CL 1045, 1957)
- Four On The Aisle (CL 1111/CS 8047, 1958)
- Breezin' Along (CL 1223/CS 8035, 1958)
- Greatest Hits (CL 1235, 1958)
- Swing Along (CL 1299/CS 8106, 1959)
- High Spirits! (CL 1407/CS 8203, 1959)
- Love Affair (CL 1502/CS 8293, 1960)
- Everything Goes!!! (CL 1550/CS 8350, 1960)

Kapp Records

- 12 Hits (KL 1224/KS 3224, 1961)
- Dixeland Doin's (KL 1254/KS 3254, 1961)

Dot Records

- Hits of the 1960's (DLP 3438/DLP 25438, 1962)
- Oh Happy Day (DLP 3533/DLP 25533, 1963)

United Artists Records

- This Year's Top Movie Songs (UAL 3356/UAS 6356, 1964)
- Songs of World War I (UAL 3399/UAS 6399, 1964)

Foma Records

- Ten Million & Still Counting (1977)

Select compilation albums of note

- 16 Most Requested Songs (1991)
- That Great Gettin' Up Mornin' (1995)
- Love Songs by the Four Lads (1997)
- Moments to Remember: The Very Best of the Four Lads (2000)
- The Singles Collection (2005)

== See also ==
- Canadian rock
- Music of Canada
