= Robert Allen (song composer) =

American pianist and an arranger

Robert Allen Deitcher (February 5, 1927 – October 1, 2000) was an American pianist and an arranger and writer of music for popular songs.

== Biography ==
Allen was born to a Jewish family in Troy, New York, and had 4 children: a son, Gordon, and 3 daughters, Pamela, Diana, and Katie.

He was an accompanist for Perry Como, Peter Lind Hayes, and Arthur Godfrey. Many of his compositions were collaborations with lyricist Al Stillman. Allen lived in New Rochelle, New York from 1963, much of his professional life. Three of his most famous songs were: "(There's No Place Like) Home for the Holidays","Everybody Loves a Lover" and "Chances Are".

Robert Allen died in Quogue, New York of colon cancer at the age of 73.

== Songs written by Robert Allen ==
=== Lyrics by Al Stillman ===
==== Perry Como hits ====
- "Noodlin' Rag" (1952)
- "Sweetheart's Holiday" (1952)
- "To Know You (Is to Love You)" (1952, redone in 1959)
- "You Are Never Far Away (From Me)" (1952, redone in 1958)
- "Home for the Holidays" (1954)
- "My One and Only Heart" (1953)
- "You Alone (Solo Tu)" (1953, redone in 1961)
- "Door of Dreams" (1955)

==== Four Lads hits ====
- "Enchanted Island" (1958)
- "Moments to Remember" (1955)
- "No, Not Much" (1956)
- "There's Only One of You" (1958)
- "Who Needs You?" (1956)

==== Johnny Mathis hits ====
- "Chances Are" (1957)
- "It's Not for Me to Say" (1957)
- "Teacher, Teacher" (1958)

==== Other hits ====
- "Al's Place" a hit for Al Hirt
- "If Dreams Came True" (a hit for Pat Boone)

=== With Richard Adler ===
- "Everybody Loves a Lover" (a hit for Doris Day in 1958 and The Shirelles in 1963)

=== Others ===
- "War Eagle" (1954 and 1955) the Auburn University fight song
- "Song for a Summer Night" (a hit for Mitch Miller and His Orchestra and Chorus in 1956)
- "Bob McGrath from Sesame Street" by Bob McGrath (1970)

== Sources ==
- ASCAP Biographical Dictionary, 4th ed. R.R. Bowker Company. 1980. ISBN 0-8352-1283-1.
