= Sonny Dunham =

American trumpet player and bandleader (1911–1990)

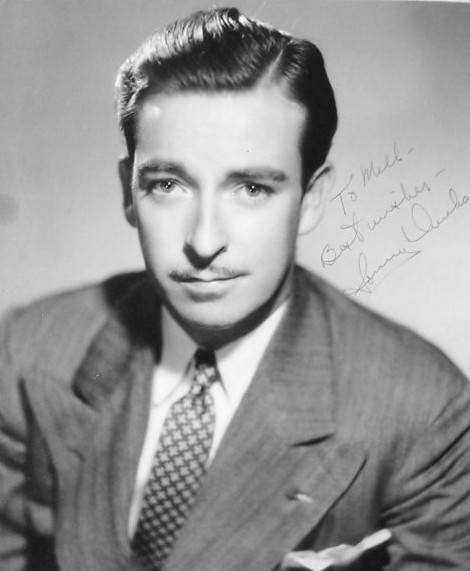
- Dunham c. 1942

Background information
- Born: Elmer Dunham; November 16, 1911
- Died: July 9, 1990 (aged 78)
- Genres: Jazz; Dixieland
- Occupations: Musician; bandleader
- Instruments: Trumpet; valve trombone; trombone
- Years active: 1924–1980s

Elmer "Sonny" Dunham (November 16, 1911 – July 9, 1990) was an American trumpet player and bandleader. A versatile musician, he was one of the few trumpet players who could double on the trombone with equal skill.

== Biography ==
Born in Brockton, Massachusetts, the son of Elmer and Ethel (née Lewis) Dunham, he attended local schools and took lessons on the valve trombone at the age of 7. He changed to the slide trombone at the age of 11, and was playing in local bands by the age of 13. Dunham began his musical career as a trombone player in the Boston area.

In the late 1920s, he moved to New York, where he played with Ben Bernie for six months before moving on in 1929 to Paul Tremaine's Orchestra, remaining there for two years. It was while he was working with Tremaine's group, where he also sang and arranged, that he switched to the trumpet.

In 1931, he left Tremaine and for a few months led his own group, calling it Sonny Dunham and his New York Yankees. In 1931, along with clarinetist Clarence Hutchenrider, trombonist-singer Pee Wee Hunt and singer Kenny Sargent, he was recruited by Glen Gray for Gray's Casa Loma Orchestra. During the golden years of Casa Loma, from 1931 to 1935, he was a popular soloist, scoring a big hit with his trumpet work on "Memories of You". His style, described as "spectacular" and "brash" is also evident on "Ol' Man River", "Wild Goose Chase", "No Name Jive", and "Nagasaki". He stayed until March 1936, when he formed another more unusual group, Sonny Lee and The New Yorkers Band, which featured 14 pieces, with ten of his musicians doubling on trumpet.

After the band failed to secure adequate bookings, he moved to Europe for three months, and in 1937, returned to the Casa Loma Orchestra, where he remained until 1940 when he tried again to form his own group, this time, with more success.

His new band debuted in July 1940 at the Glendale Auditorium in Los Angeles. Sonny's band toured the United States, playing at the top spots and holding talent searches along the way. After returning to New York in early 1941, they were on nightly radio broadcasts at the Roseland Ballroom, and at the Meadowbrook in Cedar Grove, New Jersey, in June. The band then left New York in the late summer for Hollywood, but returned to New York in January 1942, only to return to the road again by March of that year. They played at the Hollywood Palladium in April, and were also featured in the Universal picture Behind the Eight Ball with the Ritz Brothers. Dunham served as musical director for this film. The band also appeared in another Universal short film, Jivin' Jam Session.

In June 1943, they were part of a vaudeville revue at the Capitol that included a screening of Presenting Lily Mars (starring Judy Garland) and a concert. The band then left to play in Chicago, and returned to New York for an appearance at the Paramount Theatre in November 1942. From January to April 1943, his band was on the bandstand of the Hotel New Yorker. They later toured the mid-west and returned to New York late that year where they recorded for Lang-Worth Transcriptions. Dunham briefly experimented with dual female vocalists, Mickie Roy and Dorothy Claire, which did not turn out due to "professional temperament". In February 1944, the band returned to the Hotel New Yorker, and in April, performed at the Cafe Rouge Room at the Hotel Pennsylvania. The Hotel New Yorker gigs were the band's longest career engagements: two 13-week runs and one 16-week run. The band headed back to Los Angeles and performed at the Hollywood Palladium in July and August. While there, the band appeared in the Universal short film Jive Busters and then went over to Warner Bros., where they were featured in the film Sonny Dunham and His Orchestra. In September, they headed back to the East Coast. After another tour of the mid-west in 1945, and again in 1946, the band returned to New York in late 1946. 1946 found Dunham playing in a short-lived band headed by Bernie Mann that included Steve Jordan, George Dessinger and Walter Robertson.

The band had few appearances between 1947 and 1950. Upon his return to the Roseland Ballroom from a tour in March 1949, Dunham became involved in a contract dispute which irked him enough to threaten to quit the business. With a newly reorganized orchestra, late 1950 found Dunham playing the Rustic Cabin in Englewood Cliffs, New Jersey. He dissolved the band in 1951 and that September joined Tommy Dorsey's band as trumpet player, replacing Ray Wetzel, who had died in an automobile accident a few weeks prior. He reorganized in 1952 and remained active until the decline of the big-band business led him to give up the fight for the few bookings available, such as in the summer of 1960, when the Sonny Dunham Quartet was billed at Embers restaurant in New York. In the mid-sixties he led a steamship band out of New York City and was involved in booking other bands for such excursions. One of his last known recordings was a novelty tune, "Where Do You Work-a, John", for Cross-Country Records in 1956 under the name of Sonny Dunham and the Noteworthys.

Not a lot was heard from Sonny in the 1970s, although he did play trombone on a few LPs with Don Goldie's Dixieland revival bands. The 1980s found him living in a trailer in Miami, Florida, still involved in booking bands for cruises and playing occasionally when he could find work. He died from cancer on July 9, 1990, aged 78.
