= You Go to My Head (album) =

Studio album by Patti Page
- Released: 1956
- Genre: Traditional pop
- Label: Mercury

Patti Page chronology
Music for Two in Love (1956)	You Go to My Head (1956)	The Voices of Patti Page (1956)

You Go to My Head is an LP album by Patti Page, issued by Mercury Records with 12 tracks as catalog number MG-20098 in 1956.

The album was reissued with an additional 4 tracks, and combined with the 1956 Patti Page album Manhattan Tower, in compact disc format, by Sepia Records on September 4, 2007.

== Track listing ==
Track number	Title	Songwriter(s)
1	"You Go to My Head"	J. Fred Coots/Haven Gillespie
2	"While a Cigarette Was Burning"	Charles Kenny/Nick Kenny
3	"I Let a Song Go Out of My Heart"	Duke Ellington/Irving Mills/Henry Nemo/John Redmond
4	"Deep in a Dream"	Jimmy Van Heusen/Eddie DeLange
5	"I Hadn't Anyone Till You"	Ray Noble
6	"Spring Is Here"	Richard Rodgers/Lorenz Hart
7	"I Thought About You"	Jimmy Van Heusen/Johnny Mercer
8	"Darn That Dream"	Jimmy Van Heusen/Eddie DeLange
9	"I Didn't Know What Time It Was"	Richard Rodgers/Lorenz Hart
10	"What's New?"	Bob Haggart/Johnny Burke
11	"I'll Never Smile Again"	Ruth Lowe
12	"You Walk By"	Bernie Wayne/Ben Raleigh
13	"I've Got it Bad and That Ain't Good"	Duke Ellington/Paul Francis Webster
14	"Don't Get Around Much Anymore"	Duke Ellington/Bob Russell
15	"Do Nothing till You Hear from Me"	Duke Ellington/Bob Russell
16	"Under a Blanket of Blue"	Jerry Livingston/Al J. Neiburg/Marty Symes
