= Who's Sorry Now? (Connie Francis album) =

Studio album by Connie Francis
- Released: April 1958
- Recorded: October 2, 1957; March 20, 1958; March 31, 1958; April 21, 1958
- Genre: Pop
- Length: 32:19
- Label: MGM; E-3686
- Producer: Harry A. Myerson

Connie Francis chronology
Who's Sorry Now? (1958)	The Exciting Connie Francis (1959)

Singles from Who's Sorry Now?
- 1. "Who's Sorry Now?" Released: November 1957; 2. "Heartaches" Released: June 1958

Who's Sorry Now? is the debut studio album by American singer Connie Francis, released in 1958.

== Background ==
By 1957, none of Connie Francis' first nine solo singles had charted. Her duet single with Marvin Rainwater, "The Majesty Of Love", b/w "You, my Darlin' You" had only been a minor hit, peaking at number 93 (though it sold over a million copies). As a result of these failures, the managers at MGM Records had decided not to renew her contract after the last scheduled single release.

During what was supposed to be her last recording session for MGM Records in October 1957, Francis recorded a cover version of the song "Who's Sorry Now?". For quite some time, Francis' father, George Franconero Sr., had wanted his daughter to record this song with a contemporary arrangement, but the discussion had become heated and Francis had refused to record it, considering the song old fashioned and corny. Her father persisted and Francis agreed.

As her father had predicted, "Who's Sorry Now?" became a huge hit. With this success, MGM Records renewed the contract with Francis. The recording sessions for a new album, which would include the breakthrough hit, began in March 1958 and were completed in April 1958.

The album's formula is clearly inspired by the arrangement of its title song, choosing standards from the period between the 1910s and 1940s, but presenting them in a contemporary arrangement. To give the album some diversity in music styles, there were three exceptions: "My Melancholy Baby", "How Deep is the Ocean," and "I'm Beginning To See The Light" which featured grand orchestral arrangements.

When the album was released in May 1958, it failed to chart. The album was re-packaged with a new cover design and re-released in March 1962.

== Track listing ==
=== Side A ===
#	Title	Songwriter	Length
1.	"Who's Sorry Now"	Ted Snyder, Bert Kalmar, Harry Ruby	2.16
2.	"I'm Nobody's Baby"	Benny Davis, Milton Ager, Lester Santly	2.21
3.	"It's the Talk of the Town"	Jerry Livingston, Al J. Neiburg, Marty Symes	2.52
4.	"I Miss You So"	Jimmy Henderson, Sid Robin, Bertha Scott	2.32
5.	"I Cried for You"	Gus Arnheim, Arthur Freed, Abe Lyman	2.56
6.	"Heartaches"	Al Hoffman, John Klenner	2.31

=== Side B ===
#	Title	Songwriter	Length
1.	"I'm Beginning to See the Light"	Duke Ellington, Johnny Hodges, Harry James, Don George	2.39
2.	"My Melancholy Baby"	Ernie Burnett, George A. Norton	3.51
3.	"You Always Hurt the One You Love"	Doris Fisher, Allan Roberts	2.24
4.	"How Deep Is the Ocean"	Irving Berlin	2.22
5.	"If I Had You"	Irving King, Ted Shapiro	2.56
6.	"I'll Get By"	Fred E. Ahlert, Roy Turk	2.39

=== Not included songs from the sessions ===
#	Title	Songwriter	Length	Remark
1.	"I'm Sorry I Made You Cry"	Jeannine Clesi	2.27	Released on MGM Records single K 12647 but not included on album
2.	"Lock Up Your Heart"	Ted Gary, Anthony September	2.30	Take 5, referred to as "slow version" in the session notes, unreleased until 1993
3.	"Lock Up Your Heart"	Ted Gary, Anthony September	2.33	Take 11, referred to as "fast version" in the session notes, released on MGM Records single K 12647 but not included on album
4.	"You Were Only Fooling (While I Was Falling In Love)"	Larry Fotine, Fred Meadows, William Faber	2.21	Released on MGM Records single K 12588 but not included on album
