= Blue Steele =

American jazz singer, trombonist and bandleader (1893–1971)

Eugene Staples, better known by the stage name Blue Steele (March 11, 1893 – July 1, 1971) was an American jazz singer, trombonist and bandleader. He also played mellophone.

Staples was born in Arkansas and played in a hot jazz group called Watson's Bell Hops in the early 1920s. He put together an orchestra in the middle of the decade in Atlanta, and had his first engagement in Tarpon Springs, Florida soon after. The group became a popular territory band in Florida and the American South, later touring in the Midwest as well. Steele recorded around 20 songs for Victor Records during the period 1927-1930. His sidemen included Frank Martinez, Pat Davis, Joe Hall, Sammy Goble, Gene Gifford, and Kenny Sargent, all of whom later joined the Casa Loma Orchestra. Singers for the group included Kay Austin, Mabel Batson, Clyde Davis, George Marks, and Bob Nolan.

Staples had a notoriously bad temper and was regarded by his bandmates as difficult to work with; big band historian Leo Walker wrote, "musicians, anxious to depart the Steele orchestra, had sometimes...been physically beaten by the bandleader." His popularity waned over the course of the 1930s, and by 1941 he was conducting a radio orchestra on Mexico City's XEW and leading smaller ensembles. In the 1950s he led a dixieland revival group known as the Rhythm Rebels, which included Elmer Schoebel as a sideman.
