= Bells of Rosarita =

1945 film by Frank McDonald

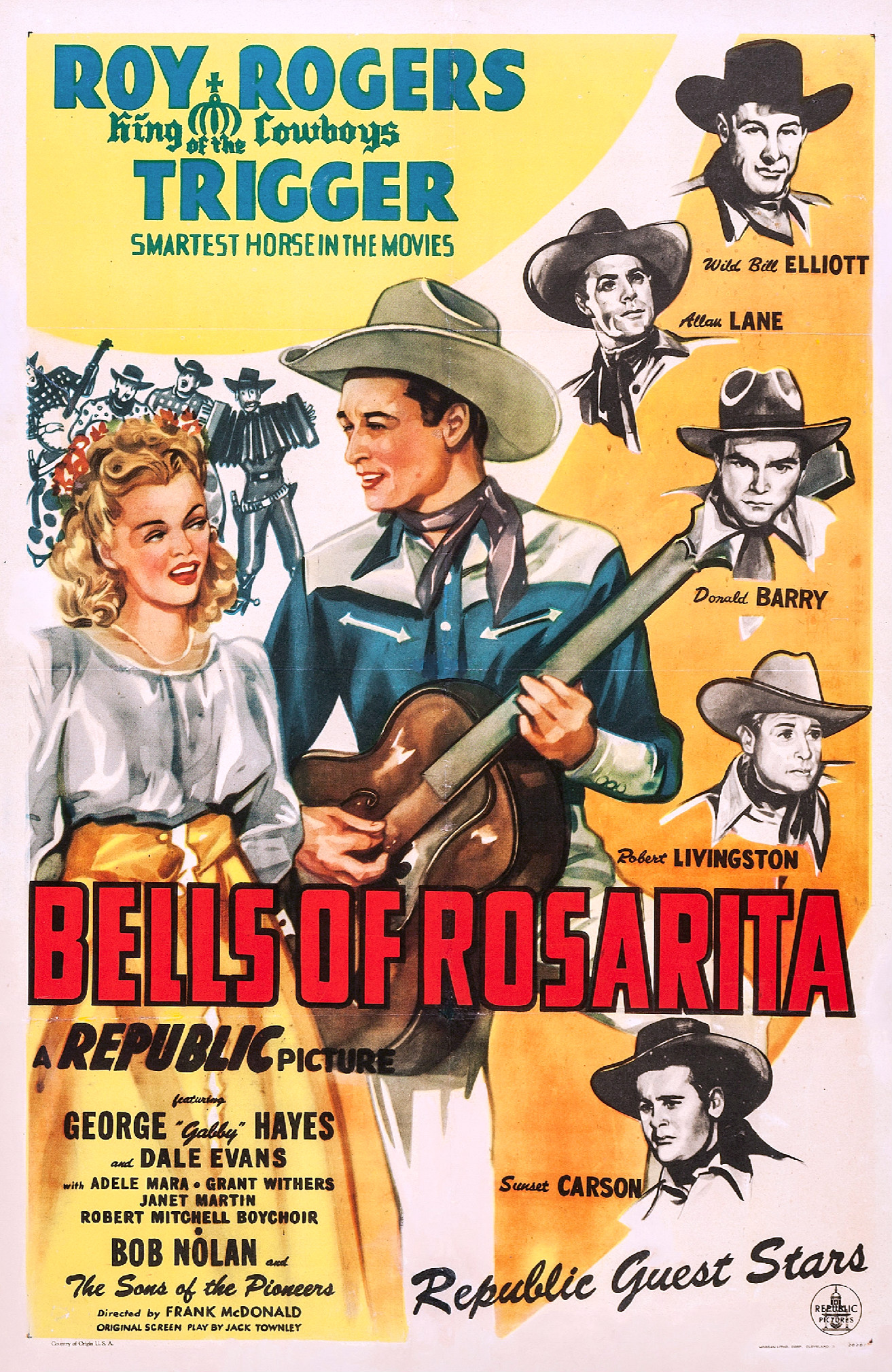
- Theatrical poster
- Directed by: Frank McDonald
- Written by: Jack Townley (screenplay)
- Produced by: Edward J. White (associate producer)
- Starring: Roy Rogers
- Cinematography: Ernest Miller
- Edited by: Arthur Roberts
- Music by: Joseph Dubin; Mort Glickman; Charles Maxwell
- Distributed by: Republic Pictures
- Release date: June 19, 1945
- Running time: 68 minutes (original version); 54 minutes (edited version)
- Country: United States
- Language: English

Bells of Rosarita is a 1945 American musical Western film starring Roy Rogers and directed by Frank McDonald.

== Plot ==
Cowboy balladeer Roy Rogers meets Sue Farnum (Dale Evans), a girl returning from back East, who is cheated out of her inheritance by a greedy scoundrel and kidnapper named Ripley (Grant Withers). As if things weren't bad enough, Roy's friend, ranch-owner Gabby Whitaker (Gabby Hayes), has misplaced his title papers. Normally, this wouldn't matter, but since that villain, Ripley, files suit claiming ownership of the ranch, it does. Not only that, but he's got an air-tight case. Roy sets out to expose Ripley, win back Sue's money and locate Gabby's title papers.

== Cast ==
- Roy Rogers as Roy Rogers
- Trigger as Trigger, Roy's Horse
- George 'Gabby' Hayes as "Gabby" Whittaker
- Dale Evans as Sue Farnum
- Adele Mara as Patty Phillips
- Grant Withers as William Ripley
- Addison Richards as Slim Phillips
- Roy Barcroft as Henchman Maxwell
- Janet Martin as Rosarita
- The Robert Mitchell Boy Choir as Boys choir
- Bob Nolan as Bob Nolan, Band Leader
- Sons of the Pioneers as Musicians
- Bill Elliott as Wild Bill Elliott
- Allan Lane as Allan Lane
- Don 'Red' Barry as Don Barry
- Robert Livingston as Bob Livingston
- Sunset Carson as Sunset Carson

== Soundtrack ==
- Roy Rogers, Dale Evans, Sons of the Pioneers and later reprised by cast - "Bells of Rosarita" (Written by John Elliott as Jack Elliott)
- Robert Mitchell Boys' Choir - "Bugler's Lullaby" (Written by Robert Mitchell and Betty Best)
- Bob Nolan and the Sons of the Pioneers - "Trail Herdin' Cowboy" (Written by Bob Nolan)
- Adele Mara (dancing) - "Aloha"
- Roy Rogers and the Sons of the Pioneers - "I'm Going To Build a Big Fence Around Texas" (Written by Cliff Friend, Katherine Phillips and George Olsen)
- Roy Rogers and the Sons of the Pioneers - "When the Circus Comes To Town" (Written by Jerry Eaton and Terry Shand)
- "Singing Down the Road" (Music by Raymond Scott, lyrics by Charles Tobias)
- "Michael Finnegan"
- Dale Evans - "Under a Blanket of Blue" (Written by Jerry Livingston, Marty Symes and Al Neiburg as Al J. Neiburg)
