= Under a Blanket of Blue =

1933 song by Jerry Livingston, Marty Symes, and Al J. Neiburg

- Original cover of "Under a Blanket of Blue" sheet music

Song by Glen Gray and his Casa Loma Orchestra
- Published: Santly Bros., Inc.
- Released: 1933
- Genre: Popular music, Jazz
- Length: 3:09
- Label: Brunswick Records
- Composer: Jerry Livingston
- Lyricists: Marty Symes, Al J. Neiburg

"Under a Blanket of Blue" is an American popular song composed by Jerry Livingston (as Jerry Levinson), with lyrics by Marty Symes and Al J. Neiburg. It was published by Santly Bros., Inc. in 1933, one of four hits by the songwriting trio that year, along with "It's the Talk of the Town."

It was first recorded by Glen Gray and the Casa Loma Orchestra, with vocals by Kenny Sargent, on Brunswick recording 6584. The song charted on Billboard on July 1, 1933, reaching #6. A month later, a subsequent recording by Don Bestor and His Orchestra also charted, reaching #8.

AllMusic calls "Under a Blanket of Blue" a "notable" composition, and says that after its initial success, the song "remained popular with jazz artists in particular." It has become a standard, performed by vocalists and instrumentalists alike.

The Tin Pan Alley Song Encyclopedia describes it as "a cozy ballad ... about a couple snuggled together under a deep blue evening sky." Music critic Will Friedwald says it's "a slightly offbeat title concept for a song about the night--usually, songwriters, including but not limited to Irving Berlin, describe the daytime skies as being blue--but make no mistake: this is a song about a nocturnal encounter, hence the blue blanket of stars."

Dale Evans sings the song under an evening sky to Roy Rogers and then Trigger in the film Bells of Rosarita (1945).

Frank Sinatra performed it in 1955 on his NBC Radio Network series To Be Perfectly Frank; that version appeared on the 1991 album Perfectly Frank: Live Broadcast Performances, 1953-1955.

== Notable Recorded Versions ==
- Layton & Johnstone – Columbia DB 1253 (1933)
- Coleman Hawkins – Mercury 1098 (1944), The Hawk Relaxes (1961)
- Woody Herman – Eight Shades Of Blue (1947)
- Helen Forrest – On The Sunny Side Of The Street (1949)
- Stan Kenton – Portraits on Standards (1953)
- Benny Goodman – The New Benny Goodman Sextet (1954)
- Calvin Jackson – At The Plaza (1954)
- Art Tatum / Benny Carter / Louis Bellson – The Tatum Group Masterpieces Vol. 1 (rec. 1954, rel. 1975)
- Frank Sinatra – Perfectly Frank: Live Broadcast Performances, 1953-1955 (rec. 1955, rel. 1991)
- Ben Webster – Music for Loving (rec. 1955, rel. 1995)
- Ella Fitzgerald & Louis Armstrong – Ella and Louis (1956)
- Patti Page – Music for Two in Love (1956)
- Doris Day – Day by Night (1957)
- Anita O'Day & Cal Tjader – Time for 2 (1962)
- Gene Ammons – The Soulful Moods of Gene Ammons (1963)
- Johnny Mathis – This Is Love (1964)
- Maxine Sullivan – I Love To Be in Love (1986)
- Stacey Kent – Dreamsville (2001)
