= Manhattan Tower =

Manhattan Tower may refer to:

- Manhattan Tower (film), a 1932 film
- Manhattan Tower, a composition released in 1946 as a 78-rpm album by Gordon Jenkins
- Manhattan Tower (Gordon Jenkins album), a 1956 album on Capitol Records, consisting of an enlargement and expansion of his 1946 composition
- Manhattan Tower (Patti Page album), a 1956 album by Patti Page, a version of the Gordon Jenkins composition
- Manhattan Tower (Tel Aviv), a skyscraper currently under construction in Tel Aviv, Israel
