= In the Land of Hi-Fi =

In the Land of Hi-Fi may refer to a number of records released on the EmArcy label:

- In the Land of Hi-Fi (Sarah Vaughan album), a 1955 album by Sarah Vaughan, released by EmArcy Records
- In the Land of Hi-Fi (Dinah Washington album), a 1956 album by Dinah Washington, released by EmArcy Records
- In the Land of Hi-Fi with Julian Cannonball Adderley, a 1956 album by Cannonball Adderley, released by EmArcy Records
- In the Land of Hi-Fi (Patti Page album), a 1956 album by Patti Page, released by EmArcy Records
- In the Land of Hi-Fi with Georgie Auld and His Orchestra, 1956 album by Georgie Auld released by EmArcy Records
- In the Land of Hi-Fi, a 1958 album by Jerry Murad's Harmonicats, released by EmArcy Records
