= Eugenie Baird =

American jazz singer (1923–1988)

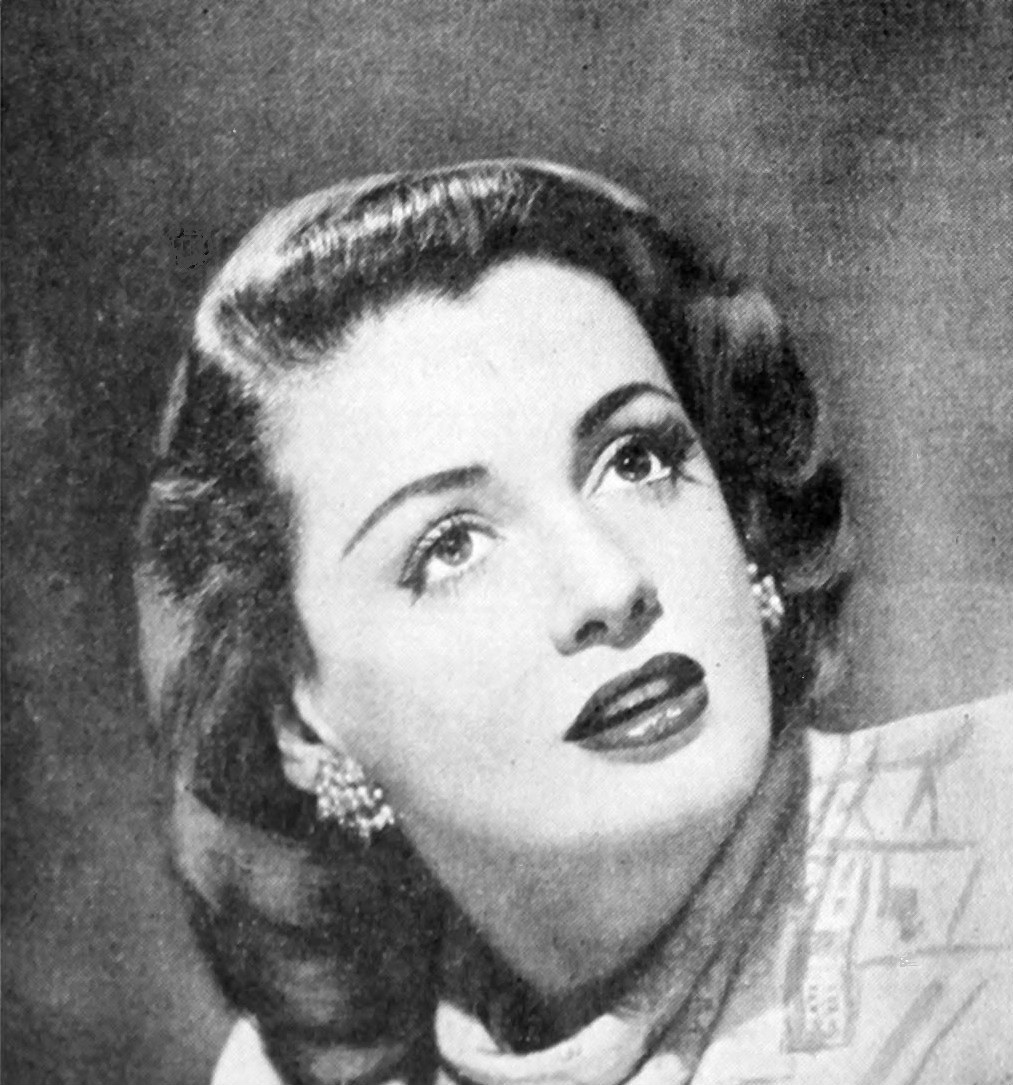
- Eugenie Baird in 1950

Background information
- Born: November 19, 1923; Mt. Lebanon, Pennsylvania, U.S.
- Died: June 12, 1988 (aged 64) Brewster, New York, U.S.
- Occupation: Singer
- Labels: Bluebird; Decca; Hi-Tone; Design

Eugenie Baird (November 19, 1923 – June 12, 1988) was an American big-band, jazz, and radio singer.

== Career ==
Baird was from Mt. Lebanon, Pennsylvania. She was the daughter of Eugene Baird, whose obituary described him as a construction foreman, but another source said that she came "from a theatrical family." She sang in choral groups in grammar school.

=== Radio ===
Baird's early experiences in radio included a thrice-weekly program of her own on KDKA in Pittsburgh, Pennsylvania. She gained that spot via audition as a high school student.

For a year starting in November 1944, Baird was Bing Crosby's singing partner on Kraft Music Hall on NBC. She hosted the radio program Eugenie Baird Sings on ABC in 1946 and she "was selected from more than 50 girls to sing the top tunes of all time." on Paul Whiteman's Forever Tops weekly program (also on ABC) that same year For the job, she moved from New York to Hollywood. The show debuted on January 21, 1946 and continued into 1947. She sang on The Jack Smith Show on NBC on The Alec Templeton Show (1947–1948), and Don McNeill's Breakfast Club.

Beginning February 12, 1949, she became the "featured female singer" on Sing It Again. Also in 1949, she was one of a group of female vocalists who participated in a 13-disk series of electrical transcriptions that featured Eddy Duchin promoting the United States Navy Reserve.

Baird signed with Lang–Worth in 1950 and was part of the Remember When series of transcriptions. In 1954, she sang with Earl Wrightson on Musicland U.S.A. on CBS.

=== Big bands ===
In a 1944 review, jazz writer George T. Simon described Baird as "the prettiest girl I've ever seen in front of a band, and, in addition, the possessor of one of the prettiest voices I've ever heard in back of a microphone." Baird "got her start...with Maurice Spitalny and Benny Burton" and sang with Jan Savitt before joining Tony Pastor for 1942-1943. In 1943 she became the vocalist for the Casa Loma Orchestra and enjoyed several hits with them before leaving to join Bing Crosby on the Kraft Music Hall radio show in November 1944.

=== Vaudeville and night clubs ===
In 1947, Baird was the featured vocalist with Henny Youngman's vaudeville show, "making her N.Y. vaude[ville] debut." She also appeared with Ray Eberle at the Steel Pier in Atlantic City, New Jersey, in August and September 1947. In September 1948, she was the headliner at the Copa nightclub in Pittsburgh, Pennsylvania.

=== Stage and film ===
Baird had the ingenue role in the Broadway production Angel in the Wings (1947–1948).

With Pee Wee Hunt and The Pied Pipers, she was in a Universal Studios short subject, Smoke Rings, that featured the Casa Loma Orchestra. Released on July 28, 1943, the film included the songs "Can't Get Stuff in Your Cuff", "That's My Affair", and "Little Man with the Hammer".

=== Jingles and commercial recordings ===
In 1950, Baird was active in making radio jingles that an article in Billboard magazine described as "songs which entertain." She and others worked for George R. Nelson to record jingles and (in the case of the Pepsi-Cola Company) records that the company could "distribute for home use" on phonographs.

In October 1981, Baird sang at a jazz festival in New York City. An article in The New York Times reported that Baird, "who sang with Glen Gray's Casa Loma Orchestra and who has been inactive for a number of years, will be making a return appearance."

== Discography ==
- The Bells of San Raquel with Tony Pastor (Bluebird, 1941)
- So Near and yet So Far with Tony Pastor (Bluebird, 1941)
- My Heart Tells Me with Glen Gray & The Casa Loma Orchestra (Decca, 1943)
- Suddenly It's Spring with Glen Gray & The Casa Loma Orchestra (Decca, 1944)
- I Fall in Love Too Easily with Mel Tormé and His Mel-Tones (Decca, 1945)
- Baby, It's Cold Outside/The Hucklebuck with Cab Calloway (Hi-Tone, 1949)
- Blue Room with Bob Curtis Quartet (Hi-Tone, 1949)
- Candy Kisses with Bob Curtis Quartet (Hi-Tone, 1949)
- How It Lies, How It Lies (Hi-Tone, 1949)
- Hurry, Hurry, Hurry (Hi-Tone, 1949)
- Eugenie Baird Sings, Duke's Boys Play Ellington (LP, Design, 1959)
