= The Exciting Connie Francis =

Studio album by Connie Francis
- Released: March 1959
- Recorded: January 14, 1959; February 1, 1959; February 11, 1959; February 18, 1959
- Genre: Pop
- Length: 34:54
- Label: MGM; E-3761 (mono)/SE-3761 (stereo)
- Producer: Ray Ellis, Harry Myerson

Connie Francis chronology
Who's Sorry Now? (1958)	The Exciting Connie Francis (1959)	My Thanks to You (1959)

Professional ratings
Review scores
Source	Rating
AllMusic	3/5 stars
Encyclopedia of Popular Music	4/5 stars

The Exciting Connie Francis is a studio album recorded by American pop singer Connie Francis. It is the second album Francis cut for MGM Records.

== Background ==
After her breakthrough in early 1958 with her single "Who's Sorry Now?", a rock 'n' roll oriented version of the 1923 standard, and a subsequent album of the same title, Francis chose to take a more adult approach to her second album. For The Exciting Connie Francis, she chose twelve American standards. Francis clearly marked the album as a concept album by dividing it into two sections with different moods: Side A is filled with songs differing between mid-tempo and up-tempo, while Side B consists solely of ballads.

The album was released in March 1959 on MGM Records 12" Album E-3761 (mono edition) and SE-3761 (stereo edition). It was repackaged and re-released in March 1962.

== Track listing ==
=== Side A ===
No.	Title	Writer(s)	Length
1.	"Come Rain or Come Shine"	Harold Arlen, Johnny Mercer	2:20
2.	"Hallelujah, I Love Him So"	Ray Charles	3:00
3.	"All by Myself"	Irving Berlin	2:32
4.	"Rock-a-Bye Your Baby with a Dixie Melody"	Jean Schwartz, Sam M. Lewis, Joe Young	2:31
5.	"There Will Never Be Another You"	Harry Warren, Mack Gordon	1:55
6.	"The Song Is Ended (But the Melody Lingers On)"	Irving Berlin, Beda Loehner	2:04

=== Side B ===
No.	Title	Writer(s)	Length
7.	"Time After Time"	Jule Styne, Sammy Cahn	3:15
8.	"How Did He Look?"	Abner Silver, Gladys Shelley	3:39
9.	"Hold Me, Thrill Me, Kiss Me"	Harry Noble	3:44
10.	"That's All"	Alan Brandt, Bob Haymes	3:22
11.	"Blame It on My Youth"	Oscar Levant, Edward Heyman	2:56
12.	"Melancholy Serenade"	Jackie Gleason, Duke Enston	3:36
