= Byron Gay =

American songwriter (1886–1945)

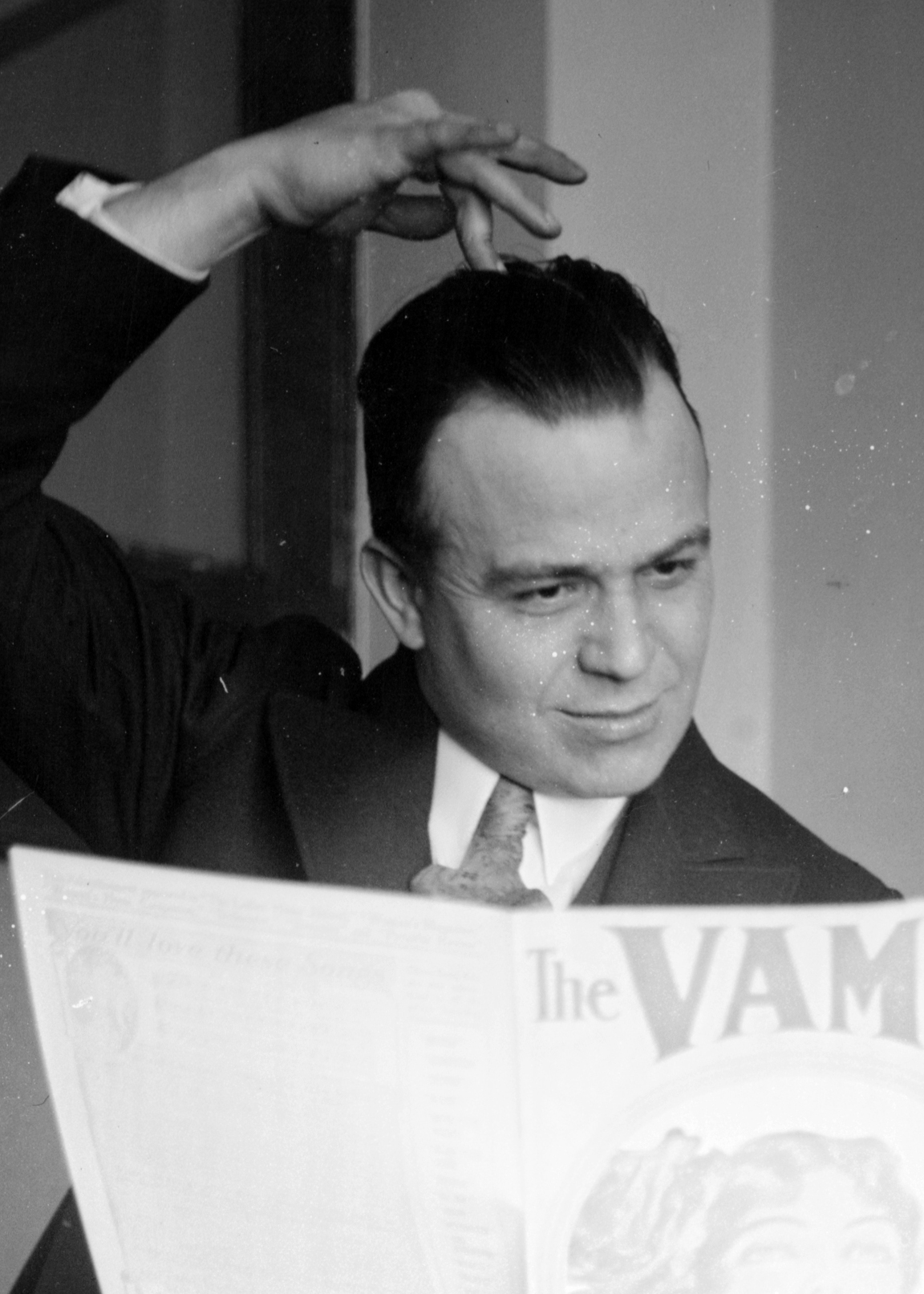
Gay with sheet music for "The Vamp"

Byron Sturges Gay (August 28, 1886 – December 22, 1945) was an American songwriter. One of his best-known songs "Four or Five Times" (co–written with Marco H. Hellman) has been recorded by numerous artists including King Oliver, Sidney Bechet, Lionel Hampton, Bob Wills, Woody Herman, Benny Goodman, Peggy Lee and more. Byron also worked with the composer Richard A. Whiting, together they wrote such songs as "Horses" and "Fire", both popular dance and comedy songs.

== Personal life ==
Gay was born on August 22, 1886, in Illinois to Cassius Mason Gay (1862–1917) and Julia Iona Fessenden Gay (1893–1947). He had two brothers and two sisters, one of whom he outlived by four months. Gay married Ethel May Stokes (June 19, 1893 – May 1, 1947) and had one daughter. He died at age 59 of congestive heart failure on December 22, 1945, in Tucson, Arizona.

== Stage productions ==
Gay wrote the music for The Uplifters' Minstrels, L. Frank Baum's 1916 stage farce for The Uplifters; he also had songs in The Greenwich Village Follies of 1919 and 1921.

== Selected list of songs ==
- "Fate" (1921)
- "Fast Asleep in Poppy Land"
- "Fire!" (Byron Gay, Richard A. Whiting) (1926)
- "Four or Five Times" (Byron Gay, Marco H. Hellman) (recorded in 1928 by King Oliver)
- "Horses" (Bryon Gay, Richard A. Whiting) (1924)
- "The Little Ford Rambled Right Along" (Byron Gay, C. R. Foster) (1914)
- "O (Oh!)" (Byron Gay, Arnold Johnson) (1919), (a 1953 recording by Pee Wee Hunt sold a million copies)
- "Sand Dunes" (1918)
- "Song of the West"
- "The Vamp" (1919)
- "Wide Open Spaces" (Byron Gay, Richard A. Whiting, Paul Whiteman) (1927)
