= Larry Wagner =

- Born: September 15, 1907; Ashland, Oregon
- Died: April 3, 2002 (aged 94) Roslyn Heights, New York
- Genres: Big Band
- Occupations: composer, arranger, bandleader
- Years active: late 1920s – 1970s
- Label: A440, Decca
- Formerly of: Casa Loma Orchestra

Larry Wagner (September 15, 1907 – April 3, 2002) was an American arranger, composer, and bandleader. He worked for the band of Paul Whiteman and was long associated with Glen Gray and the Casa Loma Orchestra. His compositions "Whistler's Mother-in-Law", "No Name Jive" and "Turn Back the Hands of Time" became nationally popular.

== Early life and career ==
Larry Wagner was born in Ashland, Oregon, on September 15, 1907. He graduated from Ashland High School in 1926, and went on to attend the University of Oregon, majoring in journalism. He dropped out of college in 1930 to play trumpet in the West Coast territory band of Johnny Robinson at Jantzen Beach Amusement Park. He moved with the band to Seattle during their tenure at the Olympic Hotel. During this time he took a correspondence course in musical arrangement offered by Archie Bleyer. He moved to New York and existed in subsidence mode as a freelance arranger, including work for Cass Daley, George Hall, and the publishing company of Clarence Williams. While in New York he befriended Bleyer on a personal basis; Bleyer helped him land a job arranging for Paul Whiteman's vocalist Durelle Alexander.

== Success ==
Wagner joined Whiteman's outfit permanently in 1936, but left as an employee in November of that year. When Whiteman needed a composition he could use for a theme-song in response to the ASCAP boycott, Murray McEachern brought Wagner's composition "Whistler's Mother-in-Law" to him as a possibility. The song greatly pleased Whiteman, who wanted to record it but did not have a recording contract at the time. Before Whiteman could record it, the song was published; a Bing Crosby and Muriel Lane duet took it to #9 on the charts and several other bands made recordings. This led to a permanent souring in Whitemans's and Wagner's relationship.

Very late in 1937, Wagner led his own band under the moniker of "Larry Wagner and his Rhythmasters", which recorded and released three sides for Victor Records.

Wagner was a member of Glen Gray's Casa Loma Orchestra, doing arranging and composing for the band between the years 1938 and 1942. "No Name Jive", which was a hit (#9) for Gray and his orchestra, was written by Wagner and in 1954, he recorded the song for A440 Records as the leader of a studio orchestra.

Wagner served in the United States Marine Corps during World War II and was part of an entertainment unit serving in the Pacific Theater. An ASCAP member, he wrote "The Men of Iwo Jima" for the Corps.

== Post-war ==
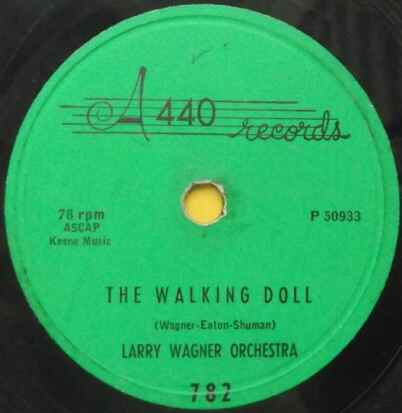
record label, A440 records, Larry Wagner Orchestra

Following his military service, Wagner re-joined the Casa Loma Orchestra as arranger, and continued studies at the Schillinger School, which he credited with furthering his abilities as an arranger. The Casa Loma outfit disbanded around 1950, leaving Wagner to pursue other projects, such as writing musicals intended for high-school performance, fronting a studio band featuring Billy Butterfield for A440 Records, forming a touring band, and recording with his band in 1956 for Forest Records in a favorably-reviewed single. During this time Wagner had another hit song with his composition Turn Back the Hands of Time which Eddie Fisher took to #8 on the charts. He continued his association with Glen Gray into the 1960s and helped perpetuate the Casa Loma leader's name after his death.

== Family ==
Wagner married Elizabeth "Betty" Brown, his high-school sweetheart, in 1931; they had a daughter, Linda. At his death, he was survived by his daughter, two grandchildren, and two great-grandchildren.

== Compositions ==
- Billy and I
- Flamenco Love
- Hearts Without Flowers
- In the Dark of the Moon
- A Lover's Lullaby
- No Name Jive
- One to Remember
- Over the Rhythm of Raindrops
- The Sound of America
- Speak Well of Me
- Turn Back the Hands of Time
- Two Dukes on a Pier
- Whistler's Mother-in-Law
- You'll Never Be Lonely
- “I Looked Back” />
