= Music for Two in Love =

Studio album by Patti Page
- Released: 1956
- Recorded: October / November 1953
- Studio: Fine Sound Studio, New York City
- Genre: Traditional pop
- Label: Mercury

Patti Page chronology
Manhattan Tower (1956)	Music for Two in Love (1956)	You Go to My Head (1956)

Music for Two in Love is a Patti Page LP album, issued by Mercury Records as catalog number MG-20099. Musical accompaniment was by Jack Rael's Orchestra.

== Track list ==
Side A
No.	Title	Length
1.	"I'm Getting Sentimental Over You"
2.	"We Just Couldn't Say Goodbye (Harry M. Woods)"
3.	"Try a Little Tenderness"
4.	"Under a Blanket of Blue"
5.	"Everything I Have Is Yours"
6.	"I Hear a Rhapsody"

Side B
No.	Title	Length
1.	"Imagination"
2.	"The Nearness of You"
3.	"I Got It Bad"
4.	"Don't Get Around Much Anymore"
5.	"Do Nothing till You Hear from Me"
6.	"Come Rain or Come Shine"
