= Sunrise Serenade =

Single by Glenn Miller
- B-side: "Moonlight Serenade"
- Released: 1939
- Recorded: April 10, 1939, RCA Bluebird
- Genre: Jazz
- Label: Bluebird Records, Bluebird B-10214-B
- Songwriters: Frankie Carle and Jack Lawrence
- Producer: Glenn Miller

"Sunrise Serenade" is a jazz song written by Frankie Carle with lyrics by Jack Lawrence. It was first recorded in 1939 by Glen Gray and the Casa Loma Orchestra with Carle on piano as Decca 2321. It soon became Carle's signature piece. Glenn Miller released a famous recording of it a few months later, arranged by Bill Finnegan, with "Moonlight Serenade" on the backside (Bluebird 10214).

== Glenn Miller recording ==
Glenn Miller recorded the song on April 10, 1939 in New York. The personnel for "Sunrise Serenade": Bob Price, Legh Knowles, Dale McMickle, on trumpet; Glenn Miller, Al Mastren, Paul Tanner, on trombone; Wilbur Schwartz, on clarinet and alto saxophone; Hal McIntyre, on alto saxophone; Stanley Aronson, on alto and baritone saxophone; Tex Beneke, Al Klink, on tenor saxophone; Chummy MacGregor, on piano; Allen Reuss, on guitar; Rowland "Rolly" Bundock, on string bass; and Moe Purtill, on drums.

== Other recordings ==
The song was also recorded by Hal Kemp and His Orchestra, Bobby Hackett & His Orchestra, Nat Gonella & His Georgians, Teddy Stauffer mit seinen Original Teddies, Lubo d'Orio mit seinem Orchester, David Rose and His Orchestra, Billy Liebert His Piano & Orchestra, Hank Thompson and His Brazos Valley Boys Orchestra, Chet Atkins, Ray Anthony, Ray Eberle, Billy Vaughn, and Roger Williams.

== Wartime release ==
"Sunrise Serenade" was released as a V-Disc by the U.S. War Department in July, 1944 as No. 230A in a new recording by Frankie Carle and his Orchestra.

== Sources ==
- Flower, John. Moonlight Serenade: A Bio-discography of the Glenn Miller Civilian Band. New Rochelle, NY: Arlington House, 1972.
- Simon, George Thomas. Simon Says. New York: Galahad, 1971. ISBN 0-88365-001-0.
- Simon, George Thomas. Glenn Miller and His Orchestra. NY: Crowell, 1974.
