= Easy to Love (Kalil Wilson album) =

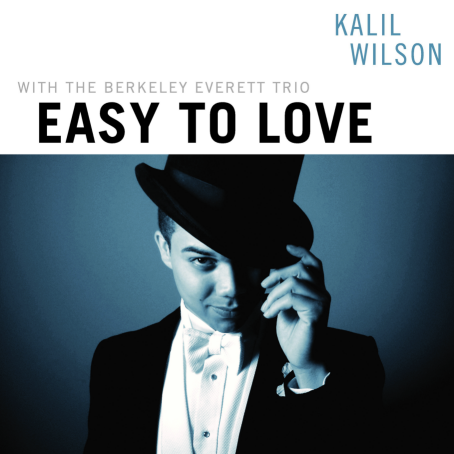

Studio album by Kalil Wilson
- Released: 2009
- Genre: Jazz
- Length: 58:41

Easy to Love is Kalil Wilson's self-produced debut album, released in 2009. It has been critically praised, and received support from jazz radio stations like KKJZ 88.1 Los Angeles and KCSM 91.1 San Francisco.

Writes Raul Da Gama Rosa, AllAboutJazz.com contributing editor:

The days of the great male crooners are over…Until, it appears, Kalil Wilson came along. Here is a singer, a profoundly smokey tenor who is so singular and naturally expressive that his voice appears biologically connected to ‘living breath.’ His phrasing, dynamics and expression are sublime, effortless and otherworldly. Wilson is heard on Easy to Love, a debut of bottomless depth and grandeur. But it's also self-effacing and completely lacking in the grandstanding that some vocalists might resort to today, in order to be heard and appreciated. His deeply personal interpretation and polished delivery make this an exquisite and priceless debut record.

— Raul Da Gama Rosa

== Track listing ==
No.	Title	Length
1.	"Day by Day"	3:26
2.	"I Concentrate on You"	4:50
3.	"You've Changed"	5:13
4.	"Nature Boy"	5:01
5.	"I Cried for You"	2:33
6.	"Easy Living"	5:00
7.	"Stardust"	3:11
8.	"I'm in the Mood for Love"	2:49
9.	"Then I'll be Tired of You"	4:53
10.	"I Only Have Eyes for You"	3:46
11.	"Do You Know Why?"	4:54
12.	"If I Could Be With You"	3:20
13.	"If It's Magic"	4:10
14.	"A Song for You"	4:00
15.	"Just for Grandma Jo"	1:35
Total length:		58:41
