= Clarence Hutchenrider =

American jazz clarinetist (1908–1991)

- Born: June 13, 1908; Waco, Texas, U.S.
- Died: August 18, 1991 (aged 83); Queens, New York, U.S.
- Genres: Jazz
- Instruments: Clarinet

Clarence Hutchenrider (June 13, 1908 – August 18, 1991) was an American jazz clarinetist. He was a member of the Casa Loma Orchestra led by Glen Gray. Originally from Detroit, the band was called the Orange Blossoms before becoming Casa La Loma.

== Early life ==
Hutchenrider was born in Waco, Texas. He started playing clarinet and saxophone when he was 14 and also led a band when he was in high school. He also performed with Jack Gardner at the Adolphus Hotel in Dallas.

== Career ==
While he was a member of Casa la Loma, he was the featured clarinetist and played baritone and alto saxophone. In 1943, a lung illness paused Hutchenrider's career for the next decade. After recovering, he played with several groups and joined the Gully Low Band in 1982. He frequently performed in New York City jazz clubs, including the Gaslight Cafe, through the 1980s.

== Personal life ==
Hutchenrider was married to model Barbara Lewis-Bradford. He had a daughter named Judith Moorefield Hutchenrider-Henderson and a son named Bradford Hutchenrider. In the late-1940s or 1950s, he married his second wife, Barbara Schwartz. They lived in Flushing, Queens, from the 1950s until his death in 1991.
