= It's the Talk of the Town =

1933 popular song

"It's the Talk of the Town" is a popular song written by Jerry Livingston, the lyrics by Al J. Neiburg and Marty Symes.

The song was published in 1933.

The song is a pop standard, with many versions recorded by many artists. A recording by Glen Gray and the Casa Loma Orchestra (vocal by Kenny Sargent) reached number six in the United States charts in 1933 and a version by Fletcher Henderson reached No. 20 the same year.

== Other notable performances ==
- Connie Boswell (1933)
- Annette Hanshaw (1933)
- Benny Goodman with Art Lund (1942)
- Bing Crosby (recorded August 29, 1945 with Jimmy Dorsey and His Orchestra).
- Harry James (1946)
- Coleman Hawkins (1950)
- Dick Haymes (1952)
- Georgia Gibbs - for her album The Man That Got Away (1953)
- Johnnie Ray (single release 1953)
- Perry Como - for his album So Smooth (1955)
- Joni James - for her EP The Talk of the Town (1955)
- Lester Young Tenor sax, with Oscar Peterson piano, Harry 'Sweets' Edison, Buck Clayton. (1955)
- The Four Aces with the Jack Pleis Orchestra (1956)
- Julie London - for her album Lonely Girl (1956)
- Sam Cooke - for his album Encore (1958)
- Joe Williams - for his album A Man Ain't Supposed to Cry (1958).
- Connie Francis for her album Who's Sorry Now? (1958)
- Frankie Laine - for his album Torchin' (1958).
- Ray Conniff Singers - for the album It's the Talk of the Town (1959).
- Anthony Newley - for his album Love Is a Now and Then Thing (1960).
- Fats Domino - for his album ...A Lot of Dominos! (1960).
- Brenda Lee - for her album Sincerely, Brenda Lee (1962)
- Ronnie Dove for his album Cry (1967)
- Boulevard of Broken Dreams Orchestra for their album It's the Talk of the Town - and Other Sad Songs (1985)
