= Hollenbeck Park =

Park in Los Angeles, California

Coordinates: 34.039956°N 118.21804°W

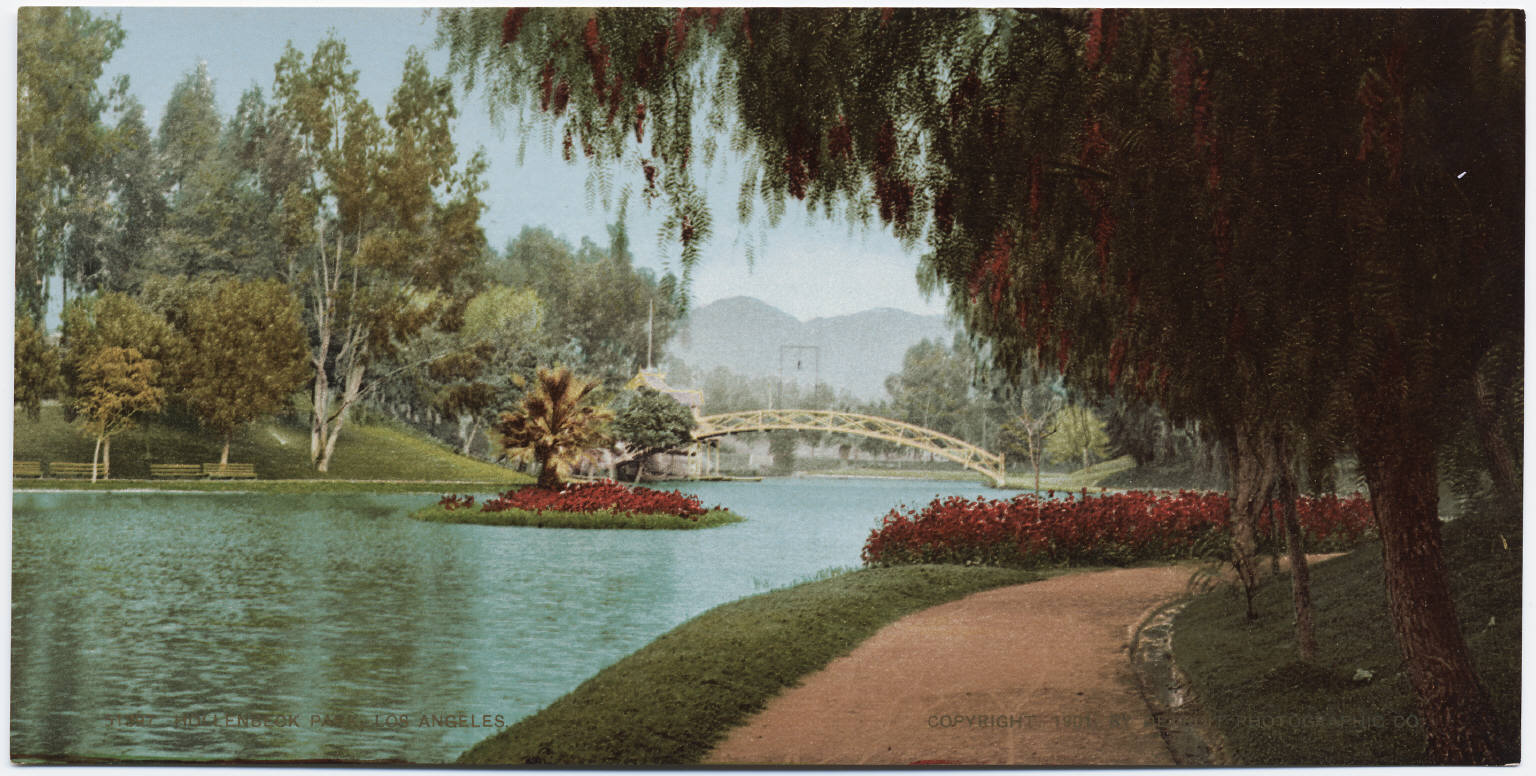
Hollenbeck Park — in a 1901 postcard.

Hollenbeck Park is a city park in the Boyle Heights district of Los Angeles, California. It is located on the corner of Saint Louis and Fourth Streets, near Boyle Avenue.

The park features grassy knolls, picnic areas, playgrounds, a skateboard park, and a man-made lake.

== History ==
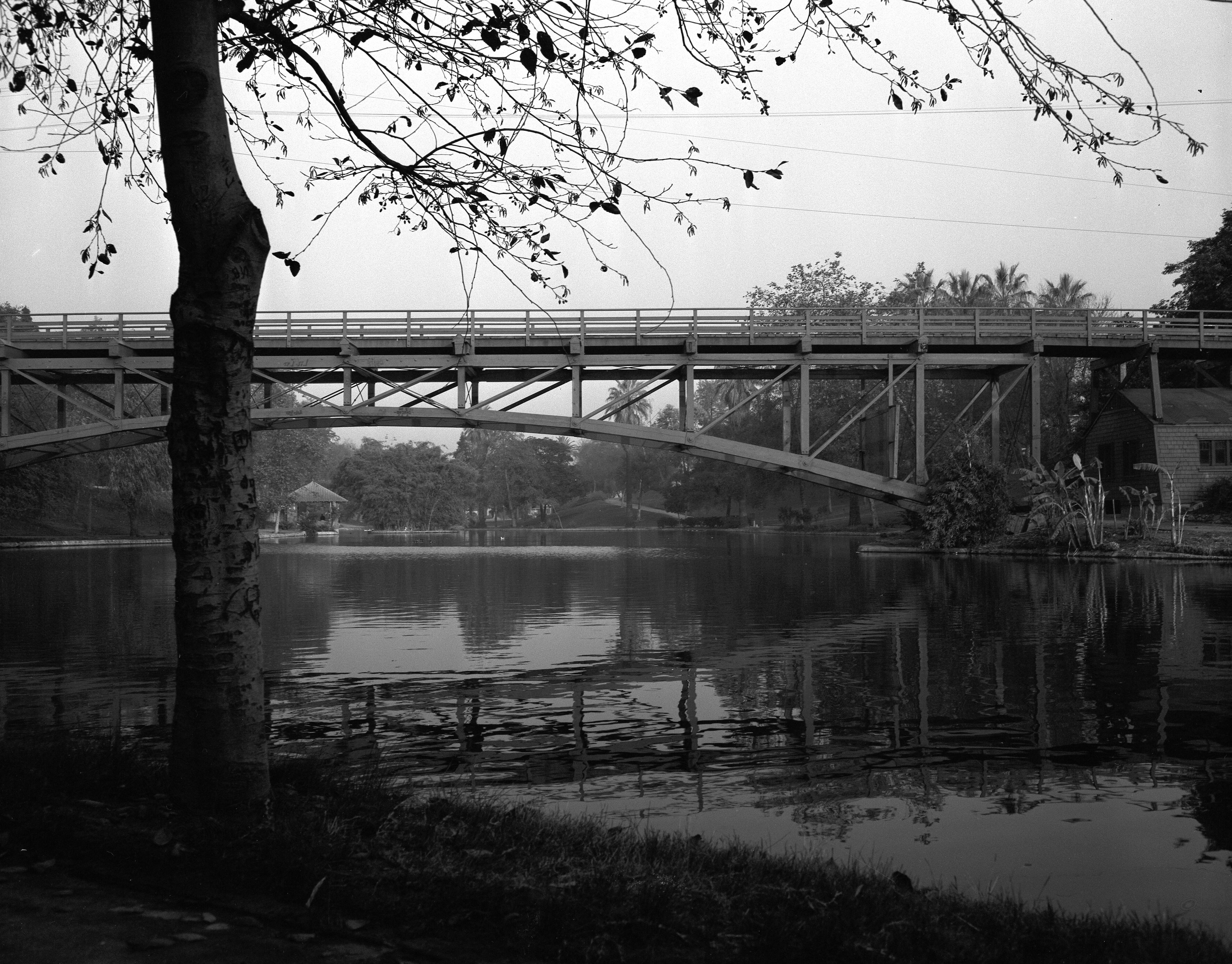
Footbridge over the lake, near the Boyle Ave. entrance (1955).

Hollenbeck Park has been a lush oasis in the neighborhood since 1892. The park was named for John Edward Hollenbeck (1829–1885), founder of First National Bank, whose widow, along with former L.A. Mayor William Workman, donated 21 acres (85,000 m^{2}) of land.

In May 1929 the Laurel and Hardy film Men O' War was filmed here, back when there were still rental boats for the public.

In the 1950s, the Golden State Freeway was built against its western boundary.

== See also ==
- List of parks in Los Angeles
