= My Heart Tells Me =

Song written by Harry Warren

"My Heart Tells Me" is a song written by Harry Warren with lyrics by Mack Gordon. It is the theme to the 1943 American musical film Sweet Rosie O'Grady, in which it is sung by lead actress Betty Grable. A 1940s standard, the song has been recorded by numerous artists, including Frank Sinatra, Tony Bennett, Nat King Cole, and Etta Jones. The film's popularity contributed to the commercial success of the version of the song recorded by bandleader Glen Gray and his Casa Loma Orchestra with vocals by singer Eugenie Baird. Titled "My Heart Tells Me (Should I Believe My Heart?)", it topped The Billboard's National Best Selling Retail Records chart for five weeks in 1944.

In 1944, the song was performed by Glenn Miller with vocals in German by Johnny Desmond and broadcast by the American Broadcasting Station in Europe (ABSIE) to German soldiers as part of the station's efforts to demoralize them.
