= Gloria Greer =

American actress (1908–1931)

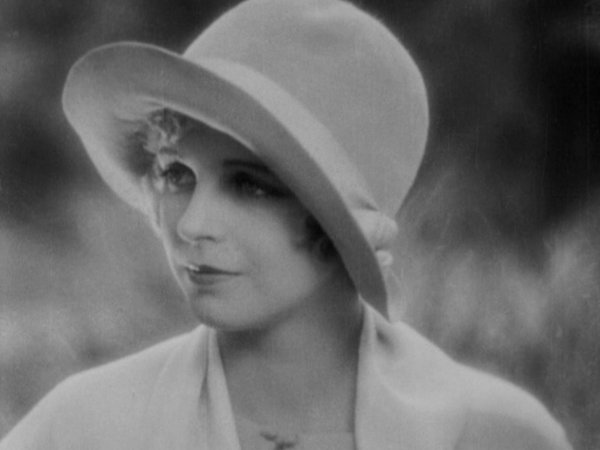
- Greer in Men O' War in 1929
- Born: Elbert Eleanor Greer; March 7, 1908; Muskogee, Oklahoma, U.S.
- Died: June 6, 1931 (aged 23); Ashland, Oregon, U.S.
- Resting place: Grand View Memorial Park and Crematory
- Education: University of Oregon
- Occupation: Actress
- Years active: 1929–1930
- Spouse: Carlos Noelle (1930-1931) (her death)
- Children: 1

Gloria Greer (born Elbert Eleanor Greer; March 7, 1908 – June 6, 1931) was an American actress who played Oliver Hardy's girlfriend in the 1929 Laurel and Hardy short Men O' War.

== Life and career ==
Born in Muskogee, Oklahoma, to Elbert Rush 'Bert' and Lillian May Greer (née Harris), she had two older sisters, Vivian and Lillian. When she was three years old, her family moved to Ashland, Oregon, where her father purchased the Ashland Daily Tidings newspaper. After graduating from Ashland High School, she attended the University of Oregon where she was a member of Chi Omega.

Keen on pursuing a movie career she relocated to Los Angeles, California, in 1927 and adopted the stage name Gloria Greer. In 1928, she joined the Hal Roach Bathing Beauties, a group of young women who appeared in provocative bathing costumes in comedy short subjects and at promotional events. Her brief career included two speaking roles, one as Oliver Hardy's girlfriend in 1929's Men O' War and another as a honeymooner in the 1930 RKO short Moonlight and Monkey Business, directed by Mark Sandrich.

== Personal life and death ==
Greer married Carlos Noelle (1904-1978) in 1930. The couple intended to relocate to Ashland, where Greer's mother lived. They were visiting there when on May 28, 1931, Greer gave birth to a son, Carlos Noelle Jr (1931-1998). Greer died on June 6, 1931, of sepsis following complications from her son's birth. Her funeral was held at the Ashland Presbyterian Church, and her body was temporarily interred in the church cemetery's mausoleum. She was subsequently interred at a cemetery in Burbank, California, where her father (who died in 1926) was buried. Her infant son was adopted by her sister, Vivian Dorothy Ling (née Greer, 1893–1966).
