= Sid Ramin =

American composer (1919–2019)

- Born: Sidney Nathan Ramin; January 22, 1919; Boston, Massachusetts, U.S.
- Died: July 1, 2019 (aged 100) New York City, U.S.
- Occupations: Orchestrator, arranger, composer
- Years active: 1950–2019

Sidney Nathan Ramin (January 22, 1919 – July 1, 2019) was an American orchestrator, arranger, and composer.

== Life ==
Sidney Nathan Ramin (or Sidney Norton Ramin), born in 1919, was the son of Russian-born Ezra Ramin, a window trimmer, and Beatrice D. (Salamoff) Ramin. He grew up in the Roxbury neighborhood of Boston and became friends with the young Leonard Bernstein when he was 12 years old. Bernstein would remain a lifelong friend and mentor. Ramin studied at Boston University and the New England Conservatory of Music, before joining the Army. He served for five years, mostly in France, and upon his return began studies at Columbia University with the help of the G.I. Bill.

Ramin orchestrated many television, film, and theatrical productions. He also composed the theme and lyrics for "Smile, You're on Candid Camera" of the hidden camera television program Candid Camera in the 1960s. In his early years, Ramin frequently collaborated with arranger Robert Ginzler, most notably on Gypsy. With Leonard Bernstein and Irwin Kostal, he co-orchestrated the music for West Side Story. He was the writer of the song "Music to Watch Girls By", first released as an instrumental single in 1967 by The Bob Crewe Generation.

Ramin married Gloria Breit, a singer and model, on January 9, 1949. They had one son, Ronald "Ron" Ramin, who also works as a composer.

Ramin celebrated his 100th birthday on January 22, 2019 and died on July 1 of the same year.

== Awards ==
Ramin won several professional awards throughout his career.

- 1961: Academy Award – Best Music, Scoring of a Musical Picture, West Side Story
- 1961: Grammy Award – Best Soundtrack Album or Recording of Original Cast from Motion Picture or Television, West Side Story
- 1983: Daytime Emmy Award – Co-winner for Outstanding Achievement in Design Excellence for a Daytime Drama Series, All My Children

== Professional works ==
=== Television ===
- Gypsy (1993 television movie)
- Miracle on 34th Street (1973 television movie)
- The Patty Duke Show (co-wrote theme)
- Candid Camera
- The Milton Berle Show

=== Film ===
- West Side Story (1961)
- Too Many Thieves (1967)
- Stiletto (1969)

=== Theatre ===
- Wonderful Town, Broadway, 1953
- West Side Story, Broadway, 1957
- Say, Darling, Broadway, 1958
- Gypsy, Broadway, 1959
- The Girls Against the Boys, Broadway, 1959
- Vintage '60, Broadway, 1960
- Wildcat, Broadway, 1960
- The Conquering Hero, Broadway, 1961
- Kwamina, Broadway, 1961
- I Can Get It for You Wholesale, Broadway, 1962
- A Funny Thing Happened on the Way to the Forum, Broadway, 1962
- Sophie, Broadway, 1963
- Look Where I'm At!, Off-Broadway, 1971
- 1600 Pennsylvania Avenue, Broadway, 1976
- Smile, Broadway, 1986
- Jerome Robbins' Broadway, Broadway, 1989
- Crazy for You, Broadway, 1992
- The Red Shoes, Broadway, 1993
