= Men O' War =

1929 film

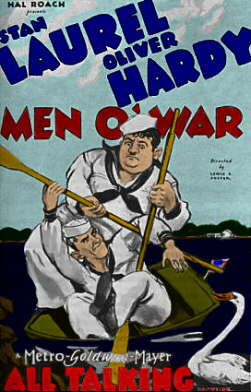
- Directed by: Lewis R. Foster
- Written by: Leo McCarey; H.M. Walker
- Produced by: Hal Roach
- Starring: Stan Laurel; Oliver Hardy; Jimmy Finlayson; Anne Cornwall; Harry Bernard; Baldwin Cooke; Gloria Greer; Charlie Hall
- Cinematography: Jack Roach; George Stevens
- Edited by: Richard C. Currier
- Distributed by: Metro-Goldwyn-Mayer
- Release date: June 29, 1929
- Running time: 19:47
- Country: United States
- Language: English

Men O' War is the third sound film starring Laurel and Hardy, released on June 29, 1929.

== Plot ==
Men O' War (1929)

Stan and Ollie, two sailors enjoying a reprieve from duty, encounter two aesthetically pleasing women during a leisurely stroll in the park. Eager to socialize, the sailors extend an invitation for refreshments, only to realize their financial constraints - sufficient funds for only three beverages. A protracted exchange ensues as Ollie endeavors to convey this dilemma to Stan, who struggles to comprehend the necessity for sacrifice.

Upon finally procuring three sodas, their plans are thwarted when the price exceeds their initial estimation. Ollie retaliates against Stan's earlier indiscretion by leaving him to settle the bill. However, Stan's luck takes a fortuitous turn when he wins a jackpot on a slot machine using a solitary coin.

Flush with unexpected wealth, the sailors rent a rowboat for a tranquil excursion with the ladies. Their idyllic outing soon descends into chaos as they become embroiled in a tumultuous altercation with other boaters on the lake, resulting in capsized vessels and a mass exodus of drenched individuals seeking refuge in Stan and Ollie's overcrowded boat, ultimately leading to its submersion.

== Cast ==
- Stan Laurel — Stan
- Oliver Hardy — Ollie
- James Finlayson — Soda Clerk
- Anne Cornwall — Stan's girlfriend
- Gloria Greer — Ollie's girlfriend
- Charlie Hall — Canoer
- Baldwin Cooke — Canoer
- Pete Gordon — Bicycle Rider
- Harry Bernard — Policeman

== Production notes ==
Men O' War was written and filmed in May 1929. Most of the film was shot at Hollenbeck Park in Los Angeles, while the soda fountain scene was shot at the Hal Roach studio. The song "Runnin' Wild" was featured over the opening credits for this film as well as They Go Boom.

The difficulties of filming on location during the early sound era were present during the making of Men O' War. Offscreen laughing from passersby present in Hollenbeck Park during filming can be heard, and the sound quality itself suffers from echoing and background noise.

This was James Finlayson's first sound film, and the one in which his trademark exclamation of "D'oh!" appeared (acknowledged by Dan Castellaneta as the progenitor for Homer Simpson's similar expression of disbelief or outrage).
