= In the Land of Hi-Fi (Patti Page album) =

Studio album by Patti Page
- Released: November 1956
- Recorded: May 7–8, 1956
- Venue: Hollywood, CA
- Genre: Pop
- Length: 27:32
- Label: EmArcy MG-36074 (mono); SR-80000 (stereo)
- Producer: Bob Shad

Patti Page chronology
Manhattan Tower (1956)	In the Land of Hi-Fi (1956)	Music for Two in Love (1956)

Professional ratings
Review scores
Source	Rating
Allmusic	link

In the Land of Hi-Fi was a Patti Page album issued by Mercury Records on its EmArcy label. Musical accompaniment was by Pete Rugolo and his Orchestra.

The album was originally issued in November 1956 as a vinyl LP.

The album was Page's first release on the EmArcy label, generally used by Mercury as a label for jazz albums.

There are time differences between the mono and stereo editions of the album, with several of the tracks edited for space in the stereo version.

== Track listing ==
Track No.	Song	Songwriter(s)	Time
1	"Nevertheless"	Harry Ruby/Bert Kalmar	1:44
2	"Out Of Nowhere"	Edward Heyman/John Green	2:16
3	"The Lady Is a Tramp"	Richard Rodgers/Lorenz Hart	2:42
4	"The Thrill Is Gone"	Lew Brown/Ray Henderson	2:51
5	"A Foggy Day"	George Gershwin/Ira Gershwin	2:44
6	"Mountain Greenery"	Richard Rodgers/Lorenz Hart	2:23
7	"I've Got My Eyes On You"	Cole Porter	1:34 (mono); 1:38 (stereo)
8	"My Kind Of Love"	Louis Alter/Jo Trent	2:37 (mono); 1:32 (stereo)
9	"I Didn't Know About You"	B. Russell/Duke Ellington	2:39
10	"My Sin"	Buddy DeSylva/Lew Brown/Ray Henderson	2:37 (mono); 1:40 (stereo)
11	"Taking A Chance On Love"	Vernon Duke/John Latouche/Ted Fetter	2:18 (mono); 1:23 (stereo)
12	"Love for Sale"	Cole Porter	2:29

== Releases ==
- In the Land of Hi Fi, Verve / Emarcy 1999
- In the Land of Hi Fi, Verve / Emarcy 1999
- In the Land of Hi Fi, Universal Distribution 2007
- In the Land of Hi Fi, Universal Distribution 2007
- Patti Page with Pete Rugolo and His Orchestra, Fresh Sound Records 2009
