= Don Walker (orchestrator) =

American musician (1907–1989)

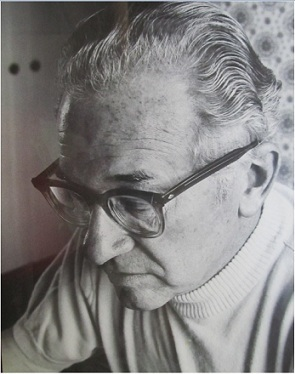
Don Walker

Don Walker (October 28, 1907 – September 12, 1989) was a prolific Broadway orchestrator, who also composed music for musicals and one film and worked as a conductor in television.

== Biography ==
Walker was born in Lambertville, New Jersey. He attended the Wharton School at the University of Pennsylvania. He and his wife, Audrey, had a daughter, Anne Liebgold, and a son, David. Walker died in New Hope, Pennsylvania in 1989 at the age of 81.

=== Career ===
As with many of the other great orchestrators, Walker served a long apprenticeship with Max Dreyfus at Chappell Music's arranging department starting in the 1930s, until he finally went out in business for himself in the early 1950s setting up office in New York City.

Among the scores that he orchestrated were those for the popular musicals Early to Bed, Carousel, Finian's Rainbow, Call Me Madam, The Pajama Game, The Music Man, Fiddler on the Roof, Shenandoah and Cabaret, as well as cult failures like Anyone Can Whistle, Greenwillow and The Gay Life. He was known for trying to give each Broadway score a unique and appropriate sound style, which he often accomplished by giving a lot of prominence to a distinctive instrument, like the accordion in Fiddler on the Roof or the cimbalom in The Gay Life. In Anyone Can Whistle, he used a string section with five cellos and no violins or violas. Like other busy orchestrators, Walker sometimes turned to assistants to score selected numbers that he didn't have time to do; several major orchestrators, including Irwin Kostal and Robert Ginzler, got their start working for him.

When older shows were revived, Walker was often chosen to re-orchestrate them in a more up-to-date style. He performed this task on the 1943 revival of A Connecticut Yankee, the 1952 revival of Pal Joey, and the Broadway revival that same year of Of Thee I Sing. During this process, he realized that original orchestrations were often neglected, and the lucrative secondary licensing business was poorly exploited. With this in mind, he set up Music Theatre International in partnership with Frank Loesser, which has managed the subsidiary rights of many shows since the mid-1950s.

Stephen Sondheim has said that Walker's work on Carousel (shared with Robert Russell Bennett) was "probably the best orchestration I ever heard in my life", but that when he worked with Walker on Anyone Can Whistle, he was disappointed to find that Walker treated him with contempt, ignored his suggestions and apparently "resented working for any young composer." Nevertheless, Sondheim was so pleased with Walker's work that a year after the show closed, he sent the orchestrator a note "to thank you once more for the marvelous job you did. I still feel proud of the piece – surprisingly – and your contribution is no small part of the glow."

Other younger songwriters had a better working relationship with Walker, particularly John Kander, who sent Walker a note after the premiere of Zorba thanking him for his work on "all our trips together – to French Canada (The Happy Time), Berlin (Cabaret), New York in the '30s (Flora the Red Menace) and Crete." They also collaborated on 70, Girls, 70. Other composers who frequently worked with Walker were Richard Rodgers (Carousel, By Jupiter, Me and Juliet), Cole Porter (Leave It to Me!, Something for the Boys, Silk Stockings) and Jerry Bock (Fiddler on the Roof, She Loves Me, The Rothschilds). He also orchestrated many shows for director George Abbott, including Wonderful Town and Damn Yankees.

When composer Sigmund Romberg died in 1951 before completing the full score of his last musical The Girl in Pink Tights, Walker who was his frequent orchestrator, was able to develop some sketches and musical ideas left of the unfinished songs for the original Broadway production.

Walker is credited with writing some arrangements for Andrew Lloyd Webber's 1975 musical By Jeeves. His orchestrations for Frank Loesser's The Most Happy Fella, which had never been filmed, were heard in the 1980 production of the play telecast on Great Performances. Walker also orchestrated the early television variety program The Admiral Broadway Revue.

Occasionally Walker wrote his own music and lyrics for Broadway. In 1945 he collaborated with Clay Warnick on Memphis Bound, a swing version of Gilbert and Sullivan's H.M.S. Pinafore, featuring legendary tap dancer Bill Robinson and an all-black cast. Courtin' Time was his 1951 musical with Jack Lawrence, notable for direction by the actor Alfred Drake. The only film score he composed was for the motion picture A Thousand Clowns, starring Jason Robards. Walker orchestrated and contributed original score elements to The Appointment (1969), starring Omar Sharif.

Walker also did the arrangements for Fred Waring's Pennsylvanians and was the conductor for the television program Your Hit Parade.
