= Bob Howard (singer) =

American musician and pianist

Bob Howard (born Howard Joyner, June 20, 1906 – December 3, 1986; another source gives his birth date as June 20, 1897) was an American pianist-vocalist on swing records in the 1930s. Born in Newton, Massachusetts, Joyner began singing in New York night clubs in the mid-1920s. He began recording in 1931 under his real name for Columbia.

Under the name Bob Howard, he played New York's Park Central Hotel, Famous Door, Hickory House and other clubs as well as theaters. He was signed to Decca in late 1934 and recorded a series of hot small group swing records between 1935 and 1938. His studio groups included Benny Carter, Buster Bailey, Rex Stewart, Ben Webster, Teddy Wilson, Russell Procope, Cecil Scott, Cozy Cole, Bunny Berigan, Artie Shaw, Babe Russin and others. Howard did not play piano on his Decca recordings, only sang.

He embarked on European tours as a solo performer. He also had his own radio series in New York in the middle and late 1930s. In the 1940s, he performed in a handful of short films (1936–1947), and in 1943 he performed in Early to Bed. He acted in an episode of Perry Mason in 1959.

In 1948, Howard hosted The Bob Howard Show on CBS, making him the first African-American to host a regularly broadcast network TV show. The program was cancelled after 13 episodes. He also was a regular performer on Sing It Again on CBS-TV in 1950 - 1951.

He later relocated to Las Vegas and Los Angeles. He died in the Bronx, New York.
