= Ashland High School (Oregon) =

Location
- 201 S. Mountain Ave. Ashland, (Jackson County), Oregon 97520; United States; 42.190931°N 122.699524°W

Information
- Type: Public
- Established: 1890
- School district: Ashland School District
- Principal: Ben Bell
- Teaching staff: 53.02 (FTE)
- Grades: 9–12
- Enrollment: 884 (2023-2024)
- Student to teacher ratio: 16.67
- Campus: Rural
- Colors: Red and white
- Athletics conference: OSAA Midwestern League 5A
- Mascot: Grizzly
- Rival: Crater High School
- Accreditation: Northwest Association of Accredited Schools
- Newspaper: Rogue News
- Website: Official site
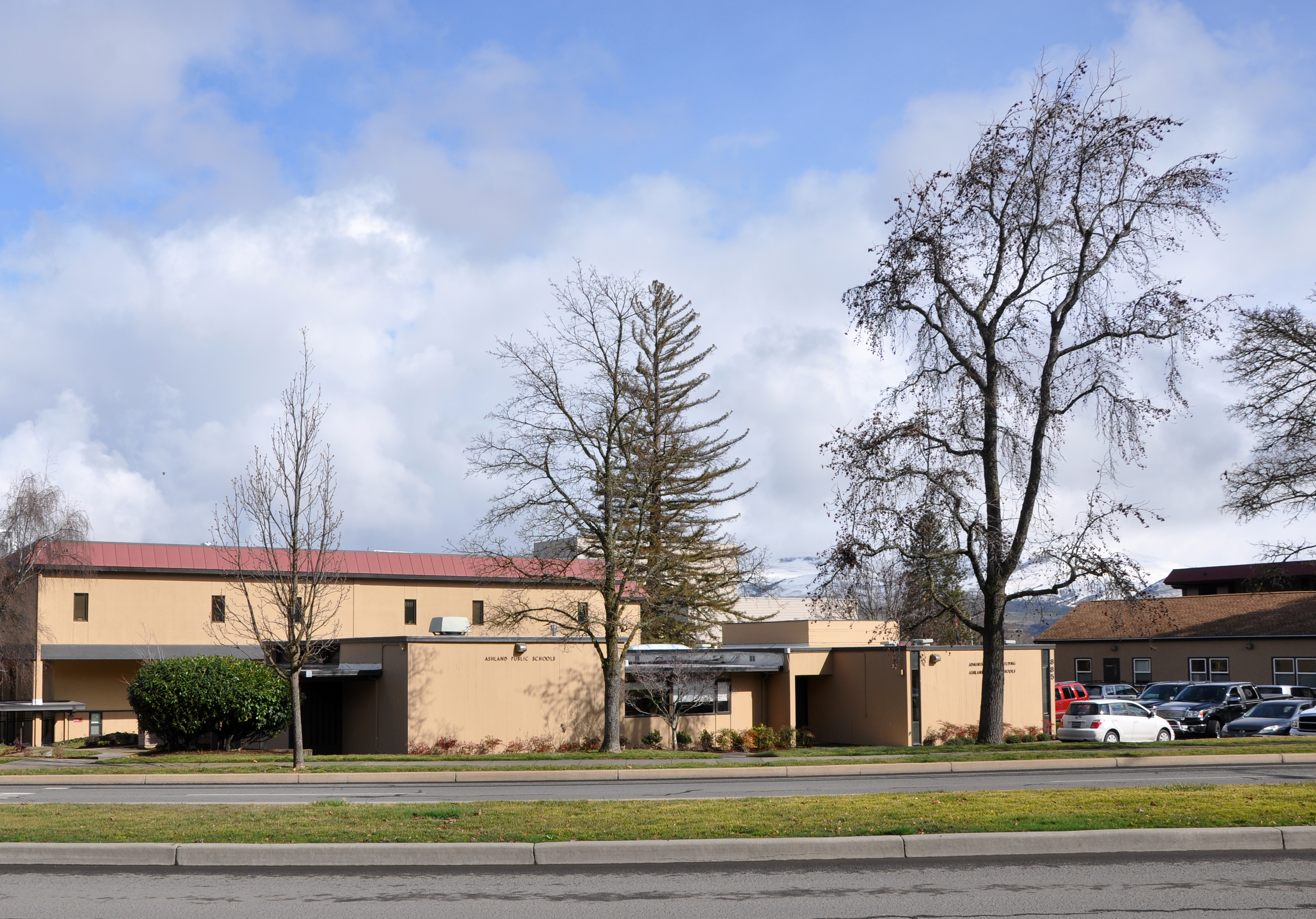
- Ashland School District administration building in 2013

Ashland High School (AHS) is a public high school in Ashland, Oregon, United States, near the Southern Oregon University campus.

== History ==
=== Fire ===
On June 3, 2006 at 2:30 pm, a fire broke out in the AHS room behind the gym during a farewell assembly for the seniors. Students and teachers were evacuated. The gym was heavily damaged and Mountain Avenue was closed for hours. No one was hurt during the fire. The fire department determined that the fire had been started by two students with firework sparklers.

=== Homecoming ===
The homecoming dance on September 25, 2015, was the first school dance at AHS to feature gender-neutral "homecoming royalty". The change was initiated by student body presidents and approved by the principal at the time, Michelle Zundel. The change received wide publicity and was announced to the student body in a video shown to all students during the mandatory "advisory" class.

On the afternoon of October 1, 2015, during the school's homecoming celebration, Ashland Police Department officers put the school into lockdown following a potential threat of a school shooting. An AHS alumnus had posted to Facebook a photo of a gun with threatening statements against the school. The Umpqua Community College shooting had taken place about three and a half hours prior, prompting the police to take the situation especially seriously. Students were kept in classes 10 minutes past the end of the day and the homecoming parade was cancelled. The threat was later deemed too vague to represent a significant danger.

== Academics ==
In 2008, 81% of the school's seniors received a high school diploma. Of 296 students, 239 graduated, 53 dropped out, one received a modified diploma, and three were still in high school in 2009.

The school received a silver ranking from U.S. News & World Report's 2010 "America's Best High Schools" survey.

== Athletics ==
Ashland High School athletic teams compete in the OSAA 5A-2 Mid-Western League.

State championships:

- Boys Basketball: 1922, 1944

== Notable alumni ==
- Michelle Alexander - writer, civil rights advocate
- Chad Cota - NFL safety
- Ann Curry (1974) - Emmy award-winning television journalist
- Alan DeBoer - state senator
- David Fincher - film director
- Sam Gaviglio - MLB pitcher, Kansas City Royals
- Gloria Greer - actress
- Jeremy Guthrie - MLB pitcher, Kansas City Royals
- Johnny Harris - filmmaker, journalist, and YouTuber
- Kenneth Hobson - U.S. Air Force four-star general
- Darren Kavinoky (1984) - criminal lawyer and television journalist
- Winona LaDuke - Native American politician
- Collin Malcolm (2015) - basketball player for Hapoel Tel Aviv of the Israeli Basketball Premier League
- Tucker Reed - author, journalist, feminist activist and convicted killer
- Sonny Sixkiller (1969) - WFL quarterback
- Hannah Stocking (2010) - social media personality
- Tessa Violet (2008) - internet vlogger, singer, and songwriter
- Larry Wagner (1926) - composer and arranger
