= I Cried for You =

"I Cried for You" is a pop and jazz standard with music written by Gus Arnheim and Abe Lyman, with lyrics by Arthur Freed. It was introduced by Abe Lyman and His Orchestra in 1923. The recording by Benny Krueger and His Orchestra the same year peaked at number 2 for two weeks and remained in the charts for ten weeks at large. Also in 1923 another interpretation of the song by the Columbians reached number 14 for one week. 15 years later in 1938 two new recordings peaked both number 13 in the Billboard charts, Bunny Berigan and His Orchestra with Kathleen Lane on vocals and an interpretation by Bing Crosby (a minor hit for him). Glen Gray and his Casa Loma Orchestra followed the next year, peaking at number 6, and in 1942 Harry James' recording was the last to get into the Billboard charts, peaking at number 19.

I Cried for You was also featured in several films including the musical short Alladin from Manhattan (1936) (starring Ruth Etting), The Women (1939), Idiot’s Delight (1939) and Babes in Arms, sung by Judy Garland (1939). In 1944 Helen Forrest sang it in Bathing Beauty with Harry James and His Music Makers. Frank Sinatra interpreted the song in The Joker Is Wild (1957), and Diana Ross sang it in Lady Sings the Blues, personifying Billie Holiday (1972).

== Recordings ==
Sortable table
Date	Main recording artist	Featured vocalists (or instrumental)	Album title, notes
1923	Abe Lyman and His Orchestra	(instrumental?)	First recording of the song
1923	Columbians	(instrumental?)	cf. 1923 in music
1923	Benny Krueger and His Orchestra	(instrumental?)	cf. 1923 in music, 10 weeks in the charts, peaking two weeks at number 2.
1932	Connee Boswell	Connee Boswell	78 rpm, Brunswick BX-11569
1932	Red Nichols and His Orchestra	Chick Bullock	78 rpm, Brunswick B-11332
1935	Mildred Bailey and Her Orchestra	Mildred Bailey	78 rpm Shellac, Parlaphone 2675
1936	Teddy Wilson and His Orchestra	Billie Holiday	With Johnny Hodges, Harry Carney and Jonah Jones; The Quintessential Billie Holiday Volume 2, cf. 1936 in music
1937	Benny Goodman Quintet	(instrumental)	cf. 1937 in music
1937	Glen Gray and The Casa Loma Orchestra	Kenny Sargent	cf. 1937 in music
1937-41	Kate Smith	Kate Smith	
1938	Bunny Berigan and His Orchestra	Kathleen Lane	cf. 1938 in music, peaked nr. 13, Casa Loma on Hi-Fi, rel. 1956
1938	Jimmy Dorsey & His Orchestra	(instrumental)	Contrasts, arranged by Tutti Camarata
1938	Bing Crosby with The John Scott Trotter Orchestra	Bing Crosby	recorded December 12, 1938, peaked nr. 13
1939	Judy Garland	Judy Garland	Feat. in the film Babes in Arms, cf. 1939 in music
1939	Glen Gray and The Casa Loma Orchestra	(instrumental?)	peaked nr. 6
1930s	Sid Phillips	(instrumental)	
1930s	Lee Wiley	Lee Wiley	
1942	Harry James and His Orchestra	Helen Forrest	cf. 1942 in music, peaked nr. 19
1945	Erroll Garner	(instrumental)	cf. 1945 in music
1946	Jazz at the Philharmonic	Billie Holiday	On June 3, with Coleman Hawkins, Illinois Jacquet, Lester Young and Buck Clayton
1946	Andy Russell and The Pied Pipers	Andy Russell	cf. 1946 in music
1947	Louis Armstrong	Velma Middleton	Satchmo at Symphony Hall, released in 1951
1947	Sarah Vaughan	Sarah Vaughan	cf. 1947 in music
1948	Louis Armstrong & the All-Stars	Velma Middleton	The Fabulous 1948 Paris Concert Vol. 1, released in 1978
1952	Count Basie and His Orchestra	Helen Humes	TV Broadcast
1952	Five Keys	Rudy West, Dickie Smith	
1954	Billie Holiday	Billie Holiday	With Oscar Peterson and Charlie Shavers Billie Holiday for Clef/Verve,
1955	Sarah Vaughan	Sarah Vaughan	After Hours with Sarah Vaughan
1956	Eddy Arnold	Eddy Arnold	cf. 1956 in music
1956	Cliff Edwards with The Wonderland Jazz Band	Cliff Edwards	Ukulele Ike Sings Again
1956	Billie Holiday	Billie Holiday	The Essential Billie Holiday: Carnegie Hall Concert Recorded Live
1956	Rita Reys with Art Blakey's Jazz Messengers	Rita Reys	The Cool Voice of Rita Reys (Philips)
1956	Frank Sinatra	Frank Sinatra	Featured in the film The Joker Is Wild, cf. 1956 in music
1957	Della Reese	Della Reese	
1957	Ethel Ennis with Orchestra cond. by Neal Hefti	Ethel Ennis	Change of Scenery, cf. 1957 in music
1957	Woody Herman and His Orchestra	(instrumental)	Live in Stereo at Marion June 8 - 1957 featuring Bill Harris
1957	Matt Monro with The Malcolm Lockyer Orchestra	Matt Monro	Blue and Sentimental
1957	Sarah Vaughan	Sarah Vaughan	Swingin' Easy
1958	Connie Francis	Connie Francis	Who's Sorry Now, cf. 1958 in music
1959	Polly Bergen with Orchestra cond. by Luther Henderson	Polly Bergen	My Heart Sings
1959	Vic Damone with Orchestra cond. by Jack Marshall	Vic Damone	On the Swingin' Side, cf. 1959 in music
1959	Sonny King with Orchestra cond. by Van Alexander	Sonny King	For Losers Only, “Colpix Find of the Year”, arr. by Johnny Williams
1959	Jimmy Rushing	Jimmy Rushing	Rushing Lullabies with Ray Bryant on piano
1960	Ella Fitzgerald	Ella Fitzgerald	Let No Man Write My Epitaph
1960	Zoot Sims	(instrumental)	Down Home
1961	Count Basie and His Orchestra	Sarah Vaughan	Count Basie / Sarah Vaughan
1962	Al Hirt	Dean Martin	Trumpet and Strings, cf. 1962 in music
1962	Carmen McRae	Carmen McRae	Sings Lover Man and Other Billie Holiday Classics
1963	Wayne Newton	Wayne Newton	Danke Schoen
1963	Claude Hopkins	(instrumental)	Swing Time!
1963	Sarah Vaughan with Woody Herman	Sarah Vaughan	1963 Live Guard Sessions
1964	Ray Charles	Ray Charles	Sweet and Sour Tears
1965	Big Maybelle	Big Maybelle	The Soul of Big Maybelle (Scepter)
1965	Rita Reys with the Pim Jacobs Trio	Rita Reys	Congratulations in Jazz
1968	Ella Fitzgerald	Ella Fitzgerald	30 by Ella
1972	Carmen McRae	Carmen McRae	The Great American Songbook, live recording with Jimmy Rowles and Joe Pass
1972	Diana Ross	Diana Ross	Featured in the film Lady Sings the Blues, a biopic tributed to Billie Holiday
1974	Dean Martin	Dean Martin	cf. 1974 in music
1976	Bertice Reading	Bertice Reading	The Two Moods of Bertice Reading
1977	Rosemary Clooney	Rosemary Clooney	Everything's Coming Up Rosie
1978	Anita O'Day	Anita O'Day	There's Only One...
1985	Rita Reys with the Pim Jacobs Trio	Rita Reys	Live at the Concertgebouw – Special Guest Louis van Dijk
1993	Dave Brubeck	(instrumental)	Trio Brubeck
2001	Etta Jones	Etta Jones	Sings Lady Day
2003	Elkie Brooks with Humphrey Lyttelton	Elkie Brooks	Trouble in Mind
2006	Stephanie Nakasian	Stephanie Nakasian	Thrush Hour: A Study of the Great Ladies of Jazz, emulating Carmen McRae
2009	Kalil Wilson	Kalil Wilson	Easy to Love
