= Sing It Again =

American radio and TV musical quiz series (1948–1951)

- Country of origin: United States
- Original language: English

Original release
- Network: CBS
- Release: May 29, 1948 – June 23, 1951

Sing It Again is an American radio musical quiz program that was broadcast on CBS from May 29, 1948, through June 23, 1951. A television simulcast began on October 7, 1950.

== Overview ==
Sing It Again offered people listening at home opportunities to win prizes by identifying a person, place, or thing from clues contained in original lyrics written for a popular song. The show's title came from its format, which had singers and an orchestra perform a song once using the original lyrics and then do the song again with lyrics that contained clues to the correct answer. Initially a correct answer gained $100 for the listener and an opportunity to identify a "phantom voice" for a prize that began at $1,000 and grew until the correct identification was made.

During the show's first year on the air, it awarded more than $200,000 in prizes, with 10 "phantom voices" being named correctly. Alf Landon's identification brought $30,000 of that amount, while identification of Sergeant Alvin York accounted for $29,000 in prizes. One jackpot valued at $20,000 included an air conditioner, an automobile, a bedroom suite, chinaware, two diamond rings, a complete electrical kitchen, a freezer, a living room suite, a full silver service, and a television. In the show's second year, the merchandise minimum was changed to $25,000, and an added feature enabled a listener to win $25,000 in cash if he or she could correctly answer a question about the "phantom". On June 25, 1949, a contestant won $27,000 in merchandise by identifying Gertrude Ederle and $25,000 in cash by coming within 30 minutes of telling how long it took her to swim across the English Channel. By July 1950 the prize structure had been changed again, eliminating the cumulative jackpot and establishing flat amounts of $5,000 in cash and $10,000 in merchandise.

Dan Seymour was master of ceremonies for Sing It Again until February 1951, when Jan Murray replaced him. Soloists included Judy Lynn, Eugenie Baird, Patti Clayton, Alan Dale, and Bob Howard, with additional singing by the Riddlers quintet. Ray Bloch led the orchestra. Don Baker was the announcer. Guest performers included Rosemary Clooney.

=== Simulcast on television ===
Beginning on October 7, 1950, Sing It Again was simulcast on CBS television. It continued to be on both media through the program's end on June 23, 1951. It originated from WCBS-TV, with Bruno Zirato Jr. as director.

== Production ==
Lester Gottlieb was the producer until February 1951, when Herb Moss replaced him. Rocco Tito was the director. Bernie Hanighen, Bill Stein, Albert Stillman, Hy Zaret, and Elsie Simmons wrote original lyrics for the songs.

The program was sustaining until Carter Products began advertising its Arrid deodorant in one quarter-hour segment on September 11, 1949. The trade publication Billboard report in September 1949 that CBS "has sunk a satchelful of loot into the giveaway". The show later picked up more sponsors, including Sterling Drug and Luden's. Sing It Again initially was on Saturdays from 8 to 9 p.m. Eastern Time, replacing Suspense. It was replaced by Songs for Sale.

== Giveaway-related concerns ==
The code of standards of the National Association of Broadcasters (NAB), which was adopted not long before this program debuted, included a provision that encouraged avoiding programs that sought to gain listeners more by hopes of material gain than by entertainment value. CBS addressed that topic with an announcement that said, in part, "while Sing It Again will feature generous cash prizes for members of the audience, primary emphasis will be on musical entertainment and on providing a chuckle through the amusing riddle lyrics." A Federal Communications Commission ban on giveaway programs caused additional problems for network executives.

NAB's code also changed the guidelines for programs that gave away merchandise. It said that all time spent listing products (other than those of the sponsor) used as prizes had to be counted as commercial time. Billboard reported that Sing It Again and Big Money Game (another giveaway show), "are using cash giveaways because of the advent of the code."

== Critical response ==
A review of the May 29, 1948, episode in Billboard complimented the program's "slick professional production" and described the performers' talents as "some good and some adequate". It summarized the show as "no better and no worse than many other giveaway programs in which the radio industry today is so regrettably indulging itself".
