= O (Oh!) =

Single by Ted Lewis and His Band
- B-side: "Barkin' Dog"
- Released: 1919
- Genre: Jazz
- Length: 3:49
- Label: Columbia
- Songwriter(s): Byron Gay, Arnold Johnson

Ted Lewis and His Band singles chronology
"Blues (My Naughty Sweetie Gave Me)" (1919)	"O (Oh!)" (1919)	"Fair One" (1920)

"O (Oh!)" is a song written by Byron Gay and Arnold Johnson and performed by Ted Lewis and His Band. It reached No. 13 on the U.S. pop chart in 1920.

== Other charting versions ==
- Pee Wee Hunt and His Orchestra released a version of the song which reached No. 3 on the U.S. pop chart in 1953.

== Other versions ==
- All-Star Trio released a version of the song as a single in 1920, but it did not chart.
- Billy Murray released a version of the song as a single in 1920, but it did not chart.
- Sauter-Finegan Orchestra released a version of the song as the B-side to their 1953 single "The Moon is Blue".
- Lawrence Welk and His Champagne Music released a version of the song as a single in 1953, but it did not chart.
- Sy Oliver and His Orchestra released a version of the song as the B-side to their 1959 single "The Touch".
- Bill Black's Combo released a version of the song on their 1964 album, Bill Black's Combo Goes Big Band.
- Boots Randolph released a version of the song on his 1973 album, Sentimental Journey.
