= Never in a Million Years (1937 song) =

Single by Bing Crosby
- B-side: "In a Little Hula Heaven"
- Released: 1937
- Recorded: February 28, 1937
- Genre: Jazz
- Length: 2:57
- Label: Decca
- Songwriters: Mack Gordon, Harry Revel

Bing Crosby singles chronology
"Sweet Is the Word for You" (1937)	"Never in a Million Years" (1937)	"Moonlight and Shadows" (1937)

"Never in a Million Years" is a song written by Mack Gordon and Harry Revel for the 1937 musical film Wake Up and Live when it was sung by Jack Haley (dubbed by Buddy Clark). It had its biggest chart success by Bing Crosby featuring Jimmy Dorsey and His Orchestra. Crosby recorded it on February 28, 1937 and it reached #2 on the US pop chart the same year.

== Other charting versions ==
- Mildred Bailey released a version of the song as a single in 1937 where it reached #8 on the US pop chart.
- Glen Gray and the Casa Loma Orchestra released a version of the song as a single in 1937 where it reached #7 on the US pop chart.
- Linda Scott released a version of the song as a single in 1962 where it reached #15 on the adult contemporary chart and #56 on the US pop chart.

== Other versions ==
- Alice Faye released a version of the song as a single in 1937.
- Gordon MacRae released a version of the song as a single in 1954 in the United Kingdom.
- Tina Robin released a version of the song as the B-side to her 1957 single "Ca C'est L'amour".
- Kitty Kallen released a version of the song on her 1960 album, If I Give My Heart to You.
- Sarah Vaughan released a version of the song on her 1961 album, My Heart Sings.
- Maureen Evans released a version of the song as a single in 1962 in the United Kingdom.
- Marion Rung released a version of the song in Finland entitled "Ei Enää Milloinkaan" as the B-side to her 1962 single "Lady Sunshine and Mister Moon".
- Guy Lombardo and His Royal Canadians released a version of the song as part of a medley on their 1963 album, The Sweetest Medleys This Side of Heaven.

== Sources ==
- Stockdale, Robert L. Jimmy Dorsey: A Study in Contrasts. (Studies in Jazz Series). Lanham, MD: The Scarecrow Press, Inc., 1999.
