= Mack Gordon =

Polish-American composer and lyricist (1904–1959)

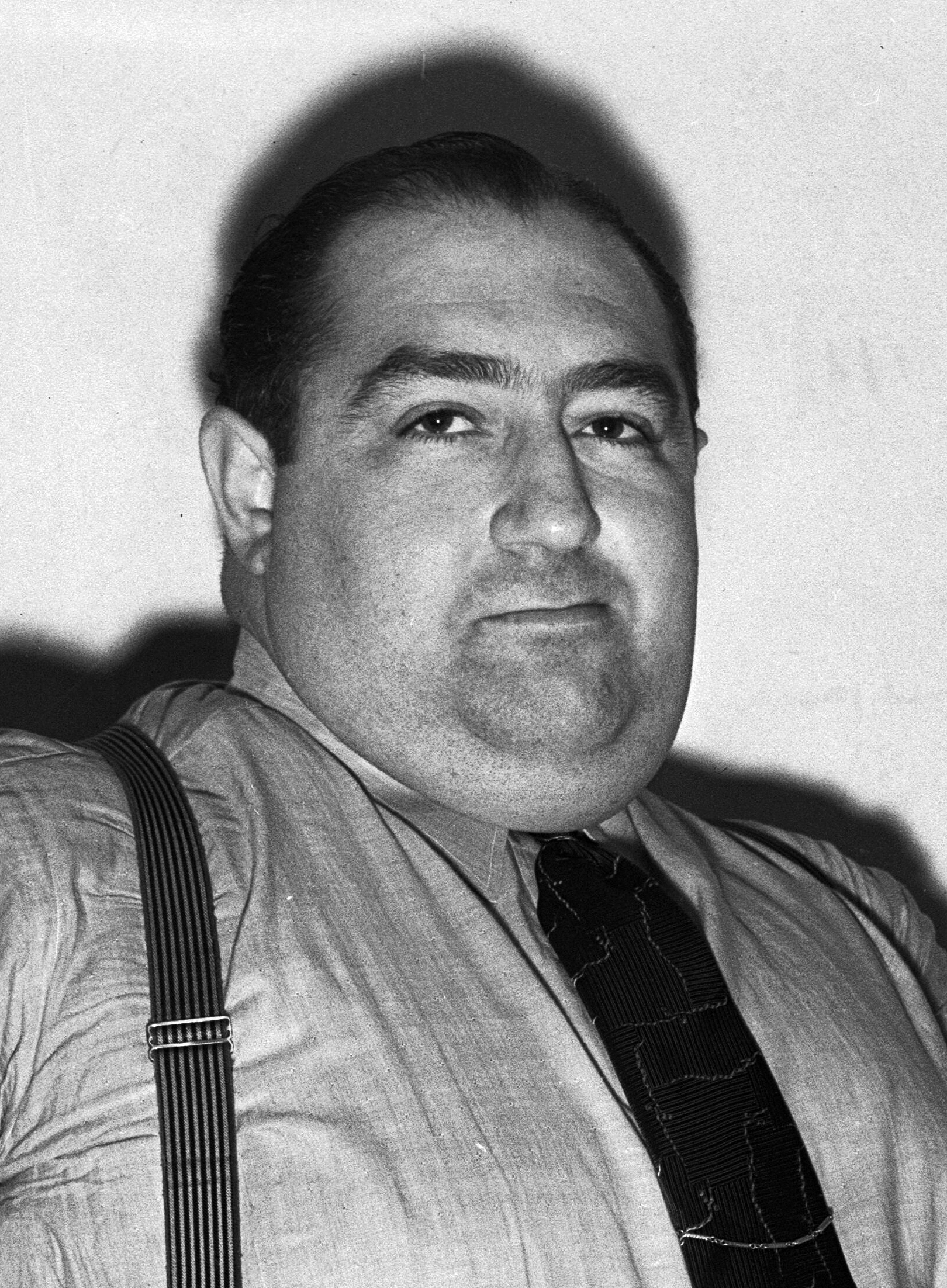
- Gordon in 1935

Background information
- Also known as: Mack Gordon
- Born: Morris Gittler; June 24, 1904
- Origin: Warsaw, Poland
- Died: February 28, 1959 (aged 54) New York City
- Occupation: Lyricist

1942 sheet music cover, "At Last", as recorded by Glenn Miller and His Orchestra from the movie Orchestra Wives, Leo Feist, New York.

Mack Gordon (born Morris Gittler; June 23, 1904 – February 28, 1959) was a Polish-American lyricist for the stage and film. He was nominated for the Academy Award for Best Original Song nine times in 11 years, including five consecutive years from 1940 to 1944, and he won the award for "You'll Never Know". "You'll Never Know", along with "At Last" and "The More I See You", have proved to be among his most enduring works, and they remain popular in film and television commercials in the 21st century.

== Biography ==
Of Jewish heritage, Gordon was born in Grodno (modern-day western Belarus), then part of the Russian Empire. He emigrated with his mother and older brother to New York City in May 1907; the ship they sailed on was the S/S Bremen; their destination was to his father in Guttenberg, New Jersey. Gordon appeared in vaudeville as an actor and singer in the late 1920s and early 1930s, but his songwriting talents were always paramount.

He formed a partnership with English pianist Harry Revel that lasted throughout the 1930s. In the 1940s he worked with a string of other composers including Harry Warren. Gordon was active in the Hollywood chapter of ASCAP and according to fellow songwriter Frank Loesser, frequently the most passionate and voluble at their meetings.

The Internet Movie Database gives credit to Gordon for songs used in the soundtracks of over 100 films, with Gordon writing specifically for at least 50 of them. His catalogue includes more than 120 songs sung by performers such as Frank Sinatra, Nat King Cole, Dean Martin, Sammy Davis Jr., Etta James, Glenn Miller, Barbra Streisand, Mel Tormé, and Christina Aguilera. His exhibit in the Songwriters Hall of Fame says he was "arguably one of the most successful lyricists to write for the screen".

Gordon died in 1959. He is entombed in the Corridor of Immortality at Home of Peace Cemetery in Los Angeles, California.

== Selected songs ==
- "A Lady Loves"
- "A Star Fell Out of Heaven"
- "A Tree Was a Tree"
- "All About Love"
- "An Old Straw Hat"
- "An Orchid to You"
- "Ain'tcha"
- "At Last"
- "Baby, Won't You Say You Love Me"
- "Chattanooga Choo-Choo"
- "Cigarettes, Cigars"
- "Danger, Love at Work"
- "Did You Ever See a Dream Walking?"
- "Doin' the Uptown Lowdown"
- "Down Argentine Way"
- "From the Top of Your Head to the Tip of Your Toes"
- "Goodnight My Love"
- "Help Yourself to Happiness"
- "I Can't Begin to Tell You"
- "I Feel Like a Feather in the Breeze"
- "I Had the Craziest Dream"
- "I Played Fiddle for the Czar"
- "I Wish I Knew"
- "I, Yi, Yi, Yi, Yi (I Like You Very Much)"
- "I'm Making Believe"
- "I've Got a Date With a Dream"
- "I've Got a Gal in Kalamazoo"
- "If You Feel Like Singing, Sing"
- "In Old Chicago"
- "It Happened In Sun Valley"
- "It Happens Every Spring"
- "It Was a Night in June"
- "It's Swell of You"
- "Listen to the German Band"
- "Lookie, Lookie, Lookie, Here Comes Cookie"
- "Love Thy Neighbor"
- "Mam'selle"
- "May I?"
- "My Heart is an Open Book"
- "My Heart Tells Me"
- "Never in a Million Years"
- "On the Boardwalk at Atlantic City"
- "Once in a Blue Moon"
- "Once Too Often"
- "Paris in the Spring"
- "Serenade in Blue"
- "She Reminds Me of You"
- "Somebody Soon"
- "Somewhere in the Night"
- "Stay As Sweet As You Are"
- "Sunny Southern Smile"
- "Takes Two to Make a Bargain"
- "Thanks for Everything"
- "The More I See You"
- "There Will Never Be Another You"
- "There's a Lull in My Life"
- "Through a Long and Sleepless Night"
- "Time on My Hands"
- "Underneath the Harlem Moon"
- "What Did I Do?"
- "When I'm With You"
- "Wilhelmina"
- "Without a Word of Warning"
- "With My Eyes Wide Open, I'm Dreaming"
- "You Do"
- "You Make Me Feel So Young"
- "You Say the Sweetest Things Baby"
- "You'll Never Know" – winner for 1943 Academy Award for Best Original Song, from Hello, Frisco, Hello

== Original works for Broadway ==
- Fast and Furious (1931) – revue – primary lyricist
- Smiling Faces (1932) – musical – lyricist
- Strike Me Pink (1933) – revue – contributing dialogue-writer
