= Casa Loma Orchestra =

American dance band (1927–1963)

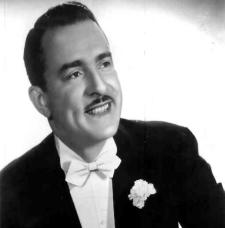
- Glen Gray

Background information
- Also known as: Orange Blossoms
- Origin: Toronto, Canada
- Genre: Swing
- Years active: 1929–1963
- Labels: Okeh, Brunswick, Victor, Decca, Capitol
- Past members: Glen Gray; Hank Biagini; Pee Wee Hunt; Frank L. Ryerson; Sonny Dunham; Clarence Hutchenrider; Tony Briglia; Kenny Sargent; Gene Gifford; Robert Ginzler; Spud Murphy; Larry Wagner; Salvador "Tutti" Camarata; Horace Henderson

The Casa Loma Orchestra was an American dance band active from 1929 to 1963. Until the rapid multiplication in the number of swing bands from 1935 on, the Casa Loma Orchestra was one of the top North American dance bands. With the decline of the big band business following the end of World War II, it disbanded in 1947. However, from 1957 to 1963, it re-emerged as a recording session band in Hollywood, made up of top-flight studio musicians under the direction of its most notable leader of the past, Glen Gray. The reconstituted band made a limited number of appearances live and on television and recorded fifteen LP albums for Capitol Records before Gray died in 1963.

The band recorded and released the original version of the jazz and big band standard "Sunrise Serenade" in 1939 with Frankie Carle on piano.

== History ==
The band assembled in 1927 as the Orange Blossoms, one of several Detroit groups that came out of the Jean Goldkette office. The band adopted the name "Casa Loma" by the time of its first recordings in 1929, shortly after it played an eight-month engagement at Casa Loma in Toronto, which was being operated as a hotel at the time. The band never played at Casa Loma under that name, still appearing as the Orange Blossoms at that time.

In 1930, the Casa Loma Orchestra was incorporated in New York, with the members becoming owners, shareholders, and board members. The band members were hired on the grounds of "musical and congenial" competence and followed strict conduct and financial rules. Because the band operated as a collective group, as opposed to almost all other bands that had a "leader" for whom everyone worked, the band maintained a stable collection of personnel that varied little. Members who broke the rules could be summoned before the "board", have their contract bought out, and be ejected from the band.

The band was led for the first few years by violinist Hank Biagini, although the eventual leader, saxophonist Glen Gray (1900 – 1963) was from the beginning "first among equals." The complex arrangements called for talented musicians such as trombonists Pee Wee Hunt and future Broadway arranger Robert Ginzler, guitarist S. Jack Blanchette, trumpeter Frank L. Ryerson, trumpeter Sonny Dunham, clarinetist Clarence Hutchenrider, drummer Tony Briglia and singer Kenny Sargent. Arrangements were by Gene Gifford, who also composed much of the band's book, Spud Murphy, Larry Wagner, Salvador "Tutti" Camarata and Horace Henderson. Gifford's arrangements were credited in large part to giving the band its sound, but even he fell victim to the band's strict rules, being bought out in 1935 due to alcohol-related infractions.

The band's manager, Cork O'Keefe, was made a vice president in the corporation and arranged bookings in venues such as Glen Island casino, which they helped popularize, and the Essex House Hotel, that led to their increasing fame via radio broadcasts before and throughout the swing era of 1935–1946.

In 1943, Eugenie Baird became "the first girl vocalist ever featured" with the Casa Loma Orchestra.

In 2019, the Casa Loma Symphony Orchestra was incorporated and became the new orchestra in residence at Casa Loma in Toronto, led by Catriona Delaney and Paolo Busato and conducted by Maestro Paolo Busato, wholly inspired by the history of this group.

== Radio ==
Their mid-1930s appearances on the long-run radio comedy-variety program, the Camel Caravan (introduced with their theme, "Smoke Rings") increased their popularity. Gray chose not to conduct the band in the early years, playing in the saxophone section while violinist Mel Jenssen acted as conductor. In 1937, the band overwhelmingly voted in favor of Glen leading the orchestra, and Gray finally accepted the job.

Hits included "Casa Loma Stomp," "No Name Jive" and "Maniac's Ball". Part of the reason for the band's decline is that other big bands included in their books hard-swinging numbers emulating the hot Casa Loma style. In the late 1930s Gray took top billing, and by the mid-1940s (as the other original players left) Gray would come to own the band and the Casa Loma name. For a time, during this period, the band featured guitarist Herb Ellis, trumpeter Bobby Hackett, pianist Nick Denucci and cornetist Red Nichols. By 1950, the Casa Loma band had ceased touring, Gray retired to Massachusetts, and the later recordings on Capitol (beginning with Casa Loma in Hi-Fi in 1956 and continuing through the Sounds of the Great Bands series) were done by studio musicians in Hollywood (with several of Gray's "alumni" occasionally featured).

== Discography (incomplete) ==
In October 1929, the band debuted on Okeh Records. The following year, they signed with Brunswick where they recorded until 1934. They briefly recorded for Victor in 1933 as "Glen Gray and his Orchestra", the Casa Loma name being under contract to Brunswick. In late 1934, they followed Jack Kapp to the newly formed Decca Records and stayed there well into the LP era when they signed with Capitol. Most of the Okeh's and many of the Brunswick's were out-and-out jazz (albeit very rehearsed) and remain highly collectible.

- 1929-30 - Stompin Around (Hep Records CD 1062, 1999)
- 1931-37 - Maniac's Ball (Hep Records CD 1051, 1996)
- 1935-41 - Boneyard Shuffle (Hep Records CD 1056, 1998)

=== Popular recordings ===
The following are some of the bands popular recordings.

- "Under a Blanket of Blue" (vocal by Kenny Sargent) (1933)
- "Sophisticated Lady" (1933)
- "It's the Talk of the Town" (vocal by Kenny Sargent) (1933)
- "Wild Goose Chase" (1933)
- "Champagne Waltz" (vocal by Kenny Sargent) (1934)
- "I Never Had a Chance" (vocal by Kenny Sargent) (1934)
- "Moonglow" (vocal by Kenny Sargent) (1934)
- "Out in the Cold Again" (vocal by Kenny Sargent) (1934)
- "Blue Moon" (vocal by Kenny Sargent) (1935)
- "When I Grow Too Old to Dream" (vocal by Kenny Sargent) (1935)
- "Fare Thee Well, Annabelle" (vocal by Pee Wee Hunt) (1935)
- "Lookie, Lookie, Here Comes Cookie" (vocal by Pee Wee Hunt) (1935)
- "With All My Heart" (vocal by Kenny Sargent) (1936)
- "Never in a Million Years" (vocal by Kenny Sargent) (1937)
- "You Go to My Head" (vocal by Kenny Sargent) (1938)
- "I Cried for You" (vocal by Kenny Sargent) (1939)
- "This Night (Will Be My Souvenir)" (vocal Clyde Burke) (1939)
- "Heaven Can Wait" (vocal Clyde Burke) (1939)
- "Sunrise Serenade" (Frankie Carle on piano) (1939)
- "Tears from My Inkwell" (vocal by Kenny Sargent) (1939)
- "A Lover's Lullaby" (vocal by Kenny Sargent) (1940)
- "No Name Jive" (vocal by Kenny Sargent) (1940)
- "One Dozen Roses" (vocal by Pee Wee Hunt) (1942)
- "Don't Get Around Much Anymore" (vocal by Kenny Sargent & LeBrun Sisters) (1943)
- "My Heart Tells Me" (vocal Eugenie Baird) (1943)
- "My Shining Hour" (vocal Eugenie Baird) (1943)
- "Gotta Be This or That" (vocal Fats Daniels) (1945)

== Film ==
In 1942, the orchestra made a Warner Bros. short film, Glen Gray and the Casa Loma Orchestra, that featured the songs "Hep and Happy," "Purple Moonlight," "Broom Street" and "Darktown Strutters Ball."

Universal Studios produced a short subject, Smoke Rings (video – via YouTube), that featured the Casa Loma Orchestra. Released July 28, 1943, the film featured Eugenie Baird, Pee Wee Hunt, and The Pied Pipers. It included the songs "Can't Get Stuff in Your Cuff," "That's My Affair" and "Little Man with the Hammer." The band also appeared in Jam Session (1944), where they played their famous "No Name Jive."

The orchestra's 1937 recording "Girl of My Dreams" was presented in the 1987 film Angel Heart with the fictional title "Life Would Be Complete" by the fictional crooner Johnny Favorite, and elements of the tune were incorporated into the score.

== Bibliography ==
=== References ===
- IMDb. "Glen Gray and the Casa Loma Orchestra". IMDb.
- Larkin, Colin, ed. (1997). The Virgin Encyclopedia of Popular Music "Casa Loma Orchestra" (Concise ed.). Virgin Books. p. 236. ISBN 9781852277451 – via Internet Archive (Arcadia Fund). LCCN 98-193479; ISBN 1-8522-7745-9; OCLC 38189417 (all editions).
1. See → Encyclopedia of Popular Music.
- Motion Picture Herald (August 7, 1943). "Short Subjects: Reviews and Synopses" → "Smoke Rings (Univ.)". Motion Picture Herald. Vol. 152, no. 6. p. 1472.
- Robertson, Alastair (1999). LP Record → Stompin' Around → Album notes: "Casa Loma Orchestra". Hep Records Hep CD 1062 – via Internet Archive (Kahle-Austin Foundation).

=== General references ===
- Billboard (January 22, 1944). "Casa Loma, Inc., Sued by Clarinetist for Accounting; All But Gray, O'Keefe Gone". Vol. 56, no. 4. p. 15.
- Borgman, George Allan (1928–2009) (October 2006). "Glen Gray and the Casa Loma Orchestra". The Mississippi Rag, The Voice of Traditional Jazz and Ragtime (magazine that ran from 1973 to 2009). Minneapolis: The Mississippi Rag, Inc., Leslie Carole Johnson (née Leslie Carole Lindstrom; 1942–2009), ed. pp. 1–10. ISSN 0742-4612; OCLC 24220300 (all editions), OCLC 300009160 (all editions).
- Casa Loma Hotel official site
- Casa Loma Orchestra discography at Discogs
- Casa Loma Orchestra at IMDb
- Down Beat; Miller, Paul Eduard (1902–1972) (July 15, 1942). "Profiling the Players." "Glen Gray – Casa Loma Band." → "Pat Davis". Vol. 9, no. 14. pp. 18–19.
1. Via WorldRadioHistory.com (PDF). Site maintained by David Frackelton Gleason (born 1946), Cleveland.
2. Via Internet Archive. (Kahle/Austin Foundation). Maher Publications Division. July 15, 1942.
- Down Beat (June 1, 1943). "Pee Wee Hunt and Pat Davis Quit Casa Loma Band". Vol. 10, no. 11. p. 2.
1. Via WorldRadioHistory.com (PDF). Site maintained by David Frackelton Gleason (born 1946), Cleveland.
2. Via Internet Archive. (Kahle/Austin Foundation). Maher Publications Division. June 1943.
- Miller, Paul Eduard (1943). Miller's Yearbook of Popular Music. "Davis, Frank Allen". Chicago: PEM Publications. p. 29 – via Internet Archive (ARChive of Contemporary Music).
- Northeastern University Library. "Glen Gray and the Casa Loma Orchestra Records, 1915–1979".
- Solid! The Encyclopedia of Big Band, Lounge, Classic Jazz and Space-Age Sounds. "Glen Gray and the Casa Loma Orchestra". Archived from the original on January 4, 2012 – via Wayback Machine.
