= Robert Ginzler =

American orchestrator

Robert "Red" Ginzler (20 July 1910, Leechburg, Pennsylvania – 29 December 1962, New York) was an American orchestrator, principally remembered for his contributions to the landmark Broadway shows Gypsy, Bye Bye Birdie and How to Succeed in Business Without Really Trying. A frequent collaborator with fellow arrangers Sid Ramin and Don Walker, he was also billed as Seymour Robert Ginzler until his heyday in the late 1950s.

Despite his relatively short career, Ginzler became an important musical mentor for Robert Farnon, John Kander and Jonathan Tunick. Contemporary reviewers often singled out his racy arrangements as being clever and first-class. Ginzler's biographer quotes him as having said, "The more music you know, the more music you love."

== Big band days ==
Ginzler was a self-taught trombonist who left his separated mother as a teenager in Detroit in 1926. He joined the Jean Goldkette band and roomed with Bix Beiderbecke; both graduated to the Paul Whiteman Orchestra. Ginzler made his first recordings in December, 1927, with a Goldkette unit including Hoagy Carmichael. While playing at the famed Casa Loma hotel and nightspot he met his wife and by 1930 had joined the Toronto Symphony Orchestra as first trombone.

In the early 1930s he worked with Percy Faith and the CBC Radio Orchestra where he met Don Walker and found success arranging for the Luigi Romanelli band. During this period Robert Farnon whom he knew from the brass section became his first protégé. "Red", as he was known, went back to the U.S. when the Canadian government declared that, in order to work at a radio station, a person had to be a British subject; Ginzler, who frequently had jobs at the CBC, was unwilling to give up his U.S. citizenship and, by the end of 1940, the family had settled in New York City.

== Broadway partnerships ==
In New York he picked up some gigs with Benny Goodman and then became the pit trombonist on the Rodgers and Hart 1942 hit By Jupiter under maestro Johnny Green, who was succeeded as conductor by Harry Levant and then—on 29 March 1943—Ginzler. In May-June 1944 he led the post-Broadway tour production of Cole Porter's Let's Face it in Washington, DC.

Thereafter until the 1950s Ginzler split his time between pit work and ghosting arrangements mainly for Walker and other composers (e.g. Irving Berlin’s Miss Liberty). Ginzler was a fast worker sometimes orchestrating as much as two-fifths of popular scores such as The Music Man and Wonderful Town. He specialized in jazzy dance numbers for the up-and-coming Bob Fosse, notably "Steam Heat" and "Whatever Lola Wants," both penned by the composing team of Adler and Ross. Occasionally Ginzler might receive assistant credits at the back of the Playbills for these shows.

In 1948 Ginzler was invited by Sid Ramin to arrange for TV on The Milton Berle Show, where the two found steady work under the musical direction of Alan Roth and Victor Young until June 1956. This was the foundation of a productive, long-standing artistic partnership between the two orchestrators. Ginzler's first lead orchestrator credit was for 1958's Oh, Captain! featuring Tony Randall in a famous extended dance sequence with the ballerina Alexandra Danilova.

When Ramin moved to the record label RCA Victor he brought in Ginzler to help him reorchestrate the album version of Jule Styne's Say, Darling performed by David Wayne and Robert Morse. Apparently, Styne was so impressed by their work that he picked them for his orchestrator team on his next show Gypsy: A Musical Fable with lyricist Stephen Sondheim and a book by Arthur Laurents. The partnership continued with Ginzler finally gaining first billing on Wildcat where Lucille Ball in her only Broadway show introduced the marching-band staple "Hey Look Me Over" in the 1960 season. That same year, away from Broadway, Ginzler became musical director of the NYC advertising-jingle house Madison Avenue Sounds.

== Blaze of activity ==
On Ramin's recommendation to composer Charles Strouse, Ginzler finally went solo with the April 1960 premiere of the Elvis satire Bye Bye Birdie. His setting of Dick Van Dyke’s choral number "Baby Talk to Me" stirred up quite a lot of excitement at the time. In this period until his untimely death, Ginzler was the primary orchestrator on 10 musicals with standouts being Frank Loesser's How to Succeed, Cy Coleman’s Wildcat and Johnny Burke' musicalization of the film The Quiet Man, called Donnybrook!. Ginzler returned earlier favors by asking his friends Walker and Ramin to contribute guest charts to his shows.

In the final year of his life, Ginzler was busy on some well-received soundtrack recordings for TV specials starring Fred Astaire and Dave Rose and his orchestra. He also gained notice for arranging flavorful Italian-themed dances for a wild troupe led by Maria Karnilova in "Ah! Camminare."

The young John Kander (future composer of Cabaret among many others) was frequently used as a dance music arranger on these shows (e.g. Irma La Douce). The orchestrator Jonathan Tunick also became another protégé at this time and has paid credit to Ginzler's influence on the dominant style of the subsequent Prince-Sondheim productions.

== Gypsy legacy ==
The overture from Gypsy is regarded by many specialists as one of musical theater's greatest. Its brassy up-tempo sound has become synonymous with the quintessential big Broadway book musical of the 1950s and early 1960s. Although composer Jule Styne was actively involved in writing the overture, he has acknowledged that the final result was greatly helped by the orchestrations created by Ramin and Ginzler: "So I wrote this [overture] with Sid Ramin and Robert Ginzler, the orchestrators. We worked it out so that, at the end, the trumpet player stood up and blew the rafters off. It was just the most exciting thing."

Ginzler's felicitous handling of woodwind as heard in Gypsy and Birdie was an especially important breakthrough to the traditional Broadway sound. And in How to Succeed, he showed he could even bring musicality to an office typewriter and humble kazoo chorus (doubling as electric razors). In November 1962 Ginzler began working on his last show directed by Sidney Lumet, prophetically titled Nowhere to Go But Up, when he died of a heart attack at just 52 years of age.

== Resources ==
- Suskin, Steven The Sound of Broadway Music: a book of orchestrators and orchestrations, New York, Oxford University Press, 2009, pp. 41–47.
- American Record Guide, vol. 54, 1991, p. 153.
- Gottfried, Martin, Broadway Musicals, 1984.
- The Internet Broadway Data Base: The Official Source for Broadway Information
