= Manhattan Tower (Gordon Jenkins album) =

Studio album by Gordon Jenkins
- Released: 1946
- Recorded: 1946
- Genre: Orchestral pop; classical; operetta; musical theatre
- Label: Decca

Manhattan Tower is a composition written by Gordon Jenkins in the 1940s and first issued to the public in 1946 as a two-disc 78-rpm set on the Decca label, DA-438. It was considered quite innovative for its time and was quite warmly received by critics and the public alike. Jenkins also performed the suite in its entirety on the very time-conscious Toast of the Town, hosted by Ed Sullivan, on February 26, 1950. An expanded 90-minute live musical dramatization, featuring Peter Marshall and Helen O'Connell, was presented as an NBC Saturday Spectacular on October 27, 1956.

== Production background ==
With the advent of 45 rpm and 33 1/3 rpm records in 1948 and 1949, the suite became one of the first recordings to be reissued by Decca in all formats then available, including 45 rpm set 9-2, 45 rpm extended play ED 462, and LP DL 8011, the LP issue being backed with Jenkins's later composition "California." The original monaural recording was "reprocessed for stereo" in the early 1960s, and that LP release remained in print into the 1970s as Decca DL 78011.

By the middle 1950s, "high fidelity sound", available on LP and 45 (as well as magnetic tape), had become the rage, and Jenkins rewrote major parts of the suite, expanding it to approximately three times its original length, and recorded it for Capitol Records in 1956 as The Complete Manhattan Tower, catalog number T-766. This new version of the suite was again a monaural recording, and appeared with Capitol's turquoise LP label; the entire suite was also issued as a 45 rpm EP set, EDM-766. Later, the album was issued on Capitol's "High-Fidelity" rainbow label. Capitol also reprocessed the recording for stereo with their own "Duophonic" process, and issued that version as DT-766; it also remained in print into the 1970s.

The 1946 Manhattan Tower combined mood music, original songs, spoken narration/dialogue, and sound effects to tell the story of a young man who travels to New York City for a visit. The tower referred to in the title is the apartment building in which he resides. Although the original suite introduces the theme of love, it is more thoroughly developed in the expanded 1956 composition. In both recordings, Elliott Lewis narrates the story and Beverly Mahr is the featured soloist; in the Capitol version, they are given the names "Stephen" and "Julie," Lewis' singing was dubbed by Bill Lee. Stephen and Julie's brief love affair forms the context of the expanded composition.

== Other versions ==
The most popular song from Manhattan Tower seems to have been "Married I Can Always Get" from the 1956 incarnation of the suite. "Married I Can Always Get" was used as the name of an album recorded by Micki Marlo, whose version of that song was contained therein. Both Teddi King and Jeri Southern issued 45-rpm singles of that song, on the RCA Victor and Decca labels respectively, while Sammy Davis Jr., also on Decca, tried his hand at "New York's My Home."

Patti Page also released a monaural recording of songs from the suite as Manhattan Tower on Mercury Records MG 20226 in 1956. In 1964, a new recording of songs from Manhattan Tower featuring vocalist Robert Goulet was touted as the first recording of the Jenkins composition in stereo; it was issued by Columbia Records in monaural OL 6050 and stereo OS 2450. While Jenkins had no involvement with the Patti Page album, he both conducted the orchestra for the Goulet recording and contributed yet another addition to the suite with the song "The Man Who Loves Manhattan."

The Decca album was issued on CD first by Collectors Choice Music (produced by the Razor and Tie label) in 1997 as part of The Gordon Jenkins Collection; it was then issued by the Jasmine label in 2006 as part of "Gordon Jenkins: A Musical Prodigy," with liner notes by Geoff Milne. The Capitol album was issued on compact disc, with bonus tracks from Jenkins's recordings for the Vik subsidiary of RCA Victor records and the Decca instrumental version of "Theme from Seven Dreams", by Sepia Records on March 19, 2007. The Sepia release contained a written endorsement from Gordon Jenkins's son Bruce Jenkins and liner notes by Johnny Owens Jr.

== Track listing ==
Track listing for 1946 edition
Track number	Title	Songwriter(s)
1	"Magical City"	
2	"The Party"	
3	"New York's My Home"	
4	"Love in a Tower"	

Track listing for 1956 edition
Track number	Title	Songwriter(s)
1	"Magical City"	
2	"Happiness Cocktail"	
3	"I'm Learnin' My Latin"	
4	"Once Upon A Dream"	
5	"Never Leave Me"	
6	"This Close To The Dawn"	
7	"Repeat After Me"	
8	"Repeat After Me" (Reprise)	
9	"The Magic Fire"	
10	"Married I Can Always Get"	
11	"The Statue Of Liberty"	
12	"The Party"	
13	"New York's My Home"	
14	"Closing"	

Track listing for 2007 edition
Track number	Title	Songwriter(s)
1	"Magical City"	
2	"Happiness Cocktail"	
3	"I'm Learnin' My Latin"	
4	"Once Upon A Dream"	
5	"Never Leave Me"	
6	"This Close To The Dawn"	
7	"Repeat After Me"	
8	"Repeat After Me" (Reprise)	
9	"The Magic Fire"	
10	"Married I Can Always Get"	Jenkins
11	"The Statue Of Liberty"	
12	"The Party"	
13	"New York's My Home"	
14	"Closing"	
15	"Theme From 'Seven Dreams'"	
16	"My Own"	
17	"Tired Of Waitin'"	
18	"Young Ideas"	
19	"Angel's Lullaby"	
20	"Through The Night"	
21	"Follow Me, Baby"	
22	"Wish I Could Say The Same"	
23	"How Do I Love You?"	
24	"You're Not Alone"	
