= Marty Symes =

American lyricist (1904–1953)

Marty Symes (1904–1953) was an American lyricist.

Symes was born in Brooklyn New York in 1904. His first significant collaborator was composer Jerry Livingston. In 1932 they wrote "Darkness on the Delta", which became a hit for Mildred Bailey. The next year the Casa Loma Orchestra recorded their "Under a Blanket of Blue" and "It's the Talk of the Town", both co-written with Al J. Neiburg.

In 1936, Symes wrote the lyrics for Isham Jones's hit "There Is No Greater Love". It has been recorded by Guy Lombardo, Billie Holiday, Al Hibbler and many other artists and is considered a jazz standard.

Nino Rota used Symes's "I Have But One Heart", composed by Johnny Farrow, in the 1972 film The Godfather.

Symes died in Forest Hills, New York in 1953.
