= Manhattan Tower (Patti Page album) =

Studio album by Patti Page
- Released: October 1956
- Recorded: September 1956
- Studios: Mercury Sound Studio, New York City
- Genre: Traditional pop
- Label: Mercury

Patti Page chronology
Romance on the Range (1955)	Manhattan Tower (1956)	In the Land of Hi-Fi (1956)

Professional ratings
Review scores
Source	Rating
Allmusic	2.5/5 stars

Manhattan Tower is an album by Patti Page, issued by Mercury Records. The album was originally issued in October 1956 as a vinyl LP. It is her version of Gordon Jenkins' popular 1948/1956 Manhattan Tower suite.

The album was reissued, combined with the 1956 Patti Page album You Go to My Head, in compact disc format, by Sepia Records on September 4, 2007.

== Reception ==
Billboard magazine liked the album commenting, inter alia, "Gordon Jenkins' new, expanded "Manhattan Tower" score soon to be showcased, via a TV spectacular is handed a class A vocal treatment by Patti Page, who sings 11 tunes...from the score with her usual good taste, technical know-how and warm sincerity..."

== Track listing ==
No.	Title	Writer(s)	Length
1.	"New York's My Home"	Gordon Jenkins
2.	"Once Upon A Dream"
3.	"Learnin' My Latin"
4.	"Happiness Cocktail"
5.	"March Marches On"
6.	"Never Leave Me"
7.	"Married I Can Always Get"
8.	"Repeat After Me"
9.	"Indian Giver"
10.	"This Close To The Dawn"
11.	"The Party" (Noah)
