= Al J. Neiburg =

American lyricist (1902–1978)

- Born: November 22, 1902; St. Albans, Vermont
- Died: July 12, 1978 (aged 75) New Haven, Connecticut
- Genres: Popular music
- Occupation: Lyricist

Allen J. Neiburg (November 22, 1902 – July 12, 1978) was an American lyricist.

He was born on 22 November 1902 in St. Albans, Vermont and received his education at Boston University. He is known for writing lyrics for such songs as "I'm Confessin' (That I Love You)" (with 'Doc' Daugherty (Ralph Edward Daugherty) and Ellis Reynolds), "It's the Talk of the Town" and "Under a Blanket of Blue" (with Jerry Livingston and Marty Symes). He also ran his own publishing company. Neiburg died in New Haven, Connecticut, on 12 July 1978.
