= Kenny Sargent =

American big band vocalist and saxophonist (1906–1969)

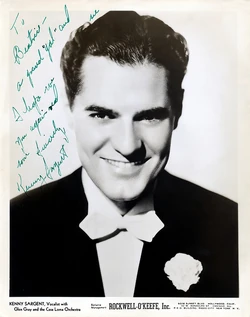

Background information
- Born: Laurel Kenneth Sargent; March 3, 1906; Centralia, Illinois, U.S.
- Died: December 20, 1969 (aged 63) Dallas, Texas, U.S.
- Genres: Big band
- Occupations: Singer, disc jockey
- Instrument: Saxophone
- Formerly of: Casa Loma Orchestra

Laurel Kenneth Sargent (March 3, 1906 – December 20, 1969) was an American big band vocalist and saxophonist, primarily known for his work with the Casa Loma Orchestra in the 1930s and 40s.

Born in Centralia, Illinois, Sargent was hired by Glen Gray of the Casa Loma Orchestra in the spring of 1931. He was the Casa Loma Orchestra's primary vocalist and a saxophonist in the late 1930s and early 40s. He had a smooth, high baritone singing voice. He recorded many popular ballads, including "It's the Talk of the Town", which was high on the national charts. Other popular songs he recorded are "Blue Moon", "City Called Heaven", "When I Grow Too Old to Dream". He performed the vocals in the first recording of the standard "You Go to My Head".

Sargent left the band in 1943 to begin a career as a disc jockey, first at WHHM in Memphis, Tennessee. He later was a well-known radio personality in Dallas, Texas at radio stations KLIF (AM) and WRR in the 1950s and 1960s.

He died in Dallas in 1969, aged 63.
