= Pee Wee Hunt =

American jazz trombonist (1907–1979)

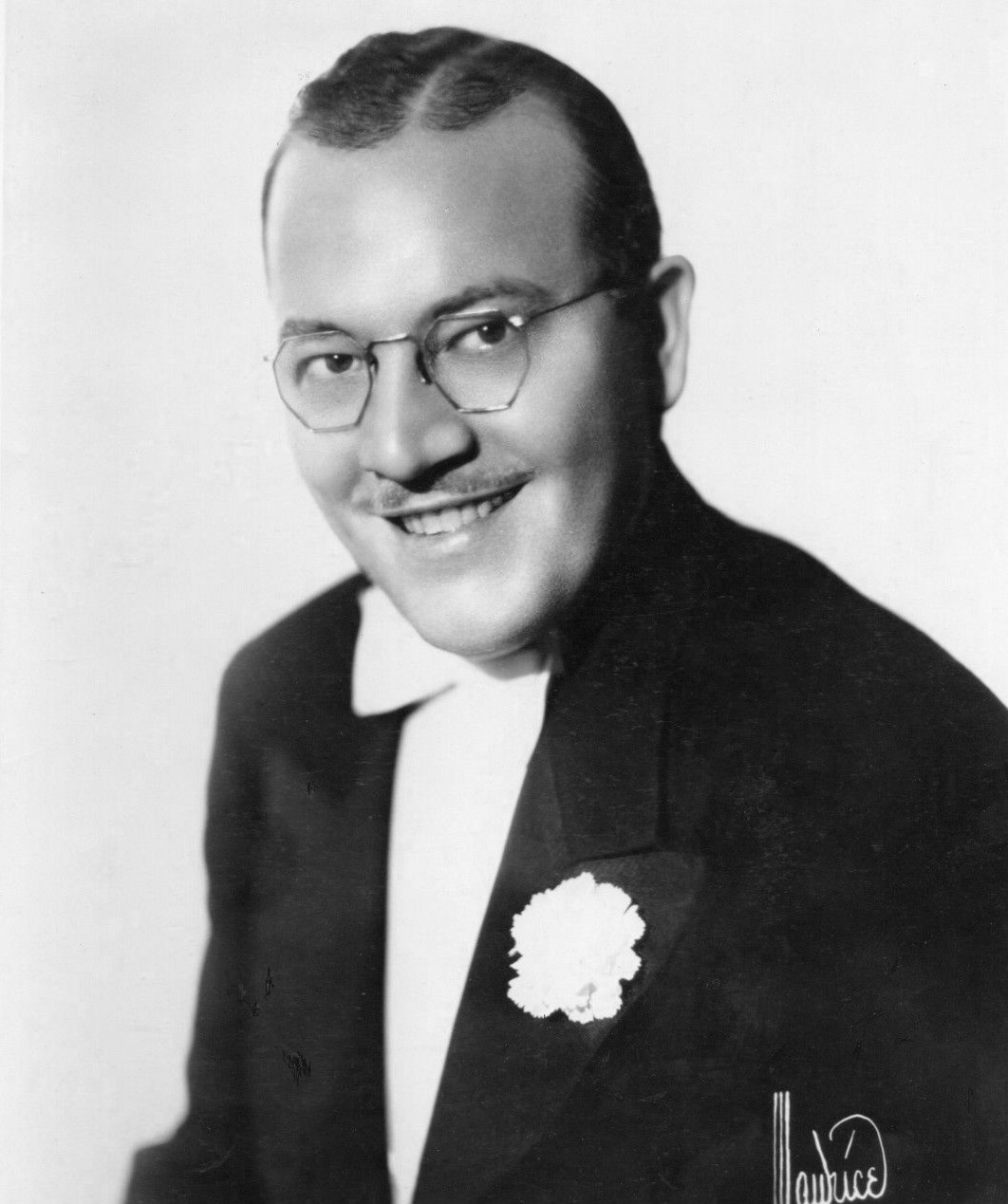
- Hunt in 1941

Background information
- Born: Walter Gerhardt Hunt; May 10, 1907; Mount Healthy, Ohio, U.S.
- Died: June 22, 1979 (aged 72) Plymouth, Massachusetts, U.S.
- Genres: Jazz
- Occupations: Trombonist, vocalist, bandleader
- Instrument: Trombone

Walter Gerhardt "Pee Wee" Hunt (May 10, 1907 – June 22, 1979) was an American jazz trombonist, vocalist, and bandleader. Hunt was born in Mount Healthy, Ohio. He developed a musical interest at an early age, as his mother, Sadie, played the banjo and his father, Edgar C., played violin. He had a younger sister, Marian, and younger brother, Raymond. The teenage Hunt was a banjoist with a local band while he was attending college at Ohio State University, where he majored in Electrical Engineering, and during his college years he switched from banjo to trombone. He graduated from the Cincinnati Conservatory of Music. He joined Jean Goldkette's Orchestra in 1928.

Hunt was the co-founder and featured trombonist with the Casa Loma Orchestra, but he left the group in 1943 to work as a Hollywood radio disc jockey, before joining the Merchant Marine near the end of World War II. He returned to the West Coast music scene in 1946. His "Twelfth Street Rag" was a three-million-selling number-one hit in September 1948. He was satirized as Pee Wee Runt and his All-Flea Dixieland Band in Tex Avery's animated MGM cartoon Dixieland Droopy (1954). His second major hit was "Oh!" (1953), his second million-selling disc, which reached number three in the Billboard chart.

At age 72, Hunt died after a long illness in Plymouth, Massachusetts. Hunt and his wife, Ruth, had a daughter, Holly, and a son, Lawrence. Grandsons William Christopher Hunt and Daniel Hunt. Great grandchildren, Emma Hunt, Hailey Hunt, and William Hunt.
