= Glen Gray =

American jazz saxophonist and orchestra leader (1900–1963)

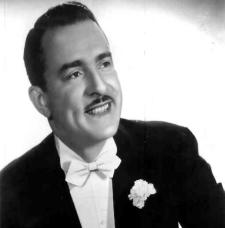

Background information
- Born: June 7, 1900; Roanoke, Illinois, United States
- Died: August 23, 1963 (aged 63) Plymouth, Massachusetts, United States
- Genres: Jazz, swing
- Occupation: Bandleader
- Instrument: Saxophone
- Years active: 1915–1963
- Labels: Brunswick, Decca, Capitol

Glenn Gray Knoblauch (June 7, 1900 – August 23, 1963), known professionally as Glen Gray, was an American jazz saxophonist and leader of the Casa Loma Orchestra.

== Early years ==
Gray was born to Lurdie P. and Agnes (Gray) Knoblauch in Roanoke, Illinois, United States. His father was a saloon keeper and railroad worker who died when Glen was two years of age. He had an older sister. His widowed mother married George H. DeWilde, a coal miner, and moved her family to Roanoke. Gray graduated from Roanoke High School, in 1917 where he played basketball and acquired his nickname, "Spike".

== Career ==
Gray attended the American Conservatory of Music in 1921 but left during his first year to go to Peoria, Illinois, to play with George Haschert's orchestra. From 1924 to 1929, he played with several orchestras in Detroit, Michigan.

Gray served as leader of the Casa Loma Orchestra although the orchestra itself had been formed as a collective group, with no designated leader. Their mid-1930s appearances on the long-run radio comedy-variety program, the Camel Caravan, (introduced with their theme, "Smoke Rings") increased their popularity. Gray chose not to conduct the band in the early years, playing in the saxophone section while violinist Mel Jenssen acted as conductor. In 1937, the band overwhelmingly voted in favor of Glen leading the orchestra, and Gray finally accepted the job. By the mid-1940s, Gray would come to own the band and the Casa Loma name. For a time, during this period, the band featured guitarist Herb Ellis, trumpeter Bobby Hackett, pianist Nick Denucci and cornetist Red Nichols.

By 1950, the Casa Loma band had ceased touring, and Gray retired to Massachusetts. The later recordings on Capitol Records (beginning with Casa Loma in Hi-Fi in 1956 and continuing through the Sounds of the Great Bands series) were done with Gray leading a group of studio musicians in Hollywood (although several of Gray's "alumni" occasionally featured). In all, some 14 high-fidelity and stereo recordings were made for Capitol under the name of Glen Gray and the Casa Loma Orchestra before Gray's death in 1963.

== Major recordings ==
Notable successes since Gray became leader in 1937 included:

Never in a Million Years (vocal by Kenny Sargent) (1937)
You Go to My Head (vocal by Kenny Sargent) (1938)
I Cried for You (vocal by Kenny Sargent) (1939)
This Night (Will Be My Souvenir) (vocal Clyde Burke) (1939)
Heaven Can Wait (vocal Clyde Burke) (1939)
Sunrise Serenade (Frankie Carle on piano) (1939)
Tears from My Inkwell (vocal by Kenny Sargent) (1939)
A Lover's Lullaby (vocal by Kenny Sargent) (1940)
No Name Jive (vocal by Kenny Sargent) (1940)
One Dozen Roses (vocal by Pee Wee Hunt) (1942)
Don't Get Around Much Anymore (vocal by Kenny Sargent & LeBrun Sisters) (1943)
My Heart Tells Me (vocal Eugenie Baird) 1943
My Shining Hour (vocal Eugenie Baird) 1943
Gotta Be This or That (vocal Fats Daniels) (1945)

== Personal life and death ==
Gray and his wife had one son.

In 1963, Gray died in Plymouth, Massachusetts of lymphoma, aged 63.
