= 1956 in music =

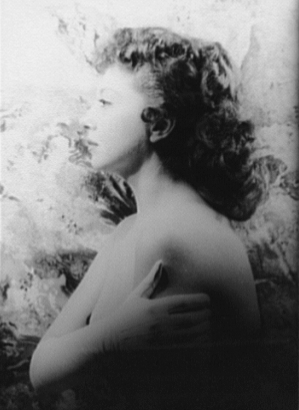
Beverly Sills in 1956

This is a list of notable events in music that took place in the year 1956.

== Specific locations ==
- 1956 in British music
- 1956 in Scandinavian music

== Specific genres ==
- 1956 in country music
- 1956 in jazz

== Events ==
- January 3 – Bach: The Goldberg Variations, Glenn Gould's debut solo piano recording, is released by Columbia Records in the United States; it sells 40,000 copies by 1960.
- January 26
  - The North American premiere of Carlos Chávez's Third Symphony is given by the New York Philharmonic, conducted by the composer. The work had been commissioned by Clare Boothe Luce to commemorate her daughter.
- January 27 – Elvis Presley's single "Heartbreak Hotel" / "I Was the One" is released. It goes on to be Elvis's first #1 hit.
- January 28 – Elvis Presley makes his national television debut on The Dorsey Brothers Stage Show.
- February 3 – The Symphony of the Air, conducted by Leonard Bernstein, gives the world première of Robert Moevs's Fourteen Variations for Orchestra (composed in 1952) in New York.
- February 11 – Henry Barraud's Concertino for Piano and Winds receives its world-première performance by Eugene List and members of the New York Chamber Ensemble in New York City.
- February 24 – "Canto a Baja California", with lyrics by Rafael Trujillo ("Caballero Aguila") and music by Rafael Gama ("Escala"), is selected as the official anthem of the Mexican states of Baja California and Baja California Sur.
- March 10 – Carl Perkins' single "Blue Suede Shoes" enters the R&B charts, the first time a country music artist has made it on the R&B charts.
- March 21 – World première of Heitor Villa-Lobos's Eleventh Symphony, by the Boston Symphony Orchestra, conducted by Charles Münch, at Carnegie Hall in New York City.
- March 22 – Carl Perkins is injured in a car accident near Wilmington, Delaware, United States, on his way to New York City to make an appearance on The Ed Sullivan Show. He spends several months in hospital.
- March 24 – The first regularly scheduled nationally broadcast rock & roll show, Rock 'n Roll Dance Party, with Alan Freed as host, premières on the CBS Radio Network.
- March 26 – Colonel Tom Parker formally becomes Elvis Presley's manager.
- March 31 – Elvis Presley films a screen test for Paramount Pictures.
- April 3 - John Serry collaborates with Mike Danzi in a revival production of A Month in the Country at the Off-Broadway Phoenix Theatre under the direction of Michael Redgrave.
- April 6 – Paramount Pictures signs Elvis Presley to a three-picture deal.
- April 10 – A group of racial segregationists (followers of Asa Earl Carter) rush the stage at a Nat King Cole concert in Birmingham, Alabama, but are quickly restrained.
- April 22 – The 2i's Coffee Bar opens in Old Compton Street, Soho, London; its basement rapidly becomes a pioneering venue for rock & roll music in Britain, Tommy Steele being resident from July.
- May 2 – For the first time in Billboard magazine history, five singles appear in both the pop and R&B Top Ten charts. They are Elvis Presley's "Heartbreak Hotel" (#1 pop, #6 R&B), Carl Perkins' "Blue Suede Shoes" (#4 pop, #3 R&B), Little Richard's "Long Tall Sally" (#9 pop, #1 R&B), the Platters' "(You've Got) The Magic Touch" (#10 pop, #7 R&B) and Frankie Lymon and the Teenagers' "Why Do Fools Fall in Love" (#7 pop, #4 R&B). Presley's and Perkins' singles also appear on the country and western Top Ten chart at #1 and #2 respectively.
- May 6–In Paris, Heitor Villa-Lobos records his Bachiana Brasileira No. 9 with the strings of the Orchestre National de la Radiodiffusion Française, for EMI.
- May 6–28 – In Paris, Heitor Villa-Lobos supervises the recording of his Bachianas Brasileiras No. 6 by Fernand Dufrene (flute) and René Plessier (bassoon) and his Bachianas Brasileiras No. 2 with the Orchestre National de la Radiodiffusion Française, the four suites of his Descobrimento do Brasil, his Chôros No. 10 and his Invocação em defesa da patria, with Maria Kareska (soprano), the Chorale des Jeunesses musicales de France, and the Orchestre National de la Radiodiffusion Française for EMI.
- May 8
  - Ernst Toch's Third Symphony is awarded the Pulitzer Prize for Music.
  - Benjamin Britten's opera Gloriana is given its US premiere in Cincinnati, in concert form conducted by Josef Krips.
- May 24 – The first-ever Eurovision Song Contest from the Kursaal Theatre, Lugano, Switzerland. Seven countries participate, each with two songs. Switzerland is declared the winner, with Lys Assia singing "Refrain".
- June – The winners of the Queen Elisabeth International Music Competition, held in Brussels and devoted this year to the piano, are:
  - First Prize: Vladimir Ashkenazy
  - Second Prize: John Browning
  - Third Prize: Andrzej Czajkowski
  - Fourth Prize: Cécile Ousset
  - Fifth Prize: Lazar Berman
- June 3 – Fred Diodati replaces Al Alberts as lead singer of the Four Aces.
- June 5 – Elvis Presley introduces his new single, "Hound Dog", on The Milton Berle Show, scandalizing the audience with his suggestive hip movements.
- June 7–13 – In Paris, Heitor Villa-Lobos records his Bachiana Brasileira No. 5 with Victoria de los Ángeles (soprano) and a cello ensemble from the Orchestre National de la Radiodiffusion Française, for EMI.
- June 13 – Herbert von Karajan is announced as the new artistic director of the Vienna State Opera, to succeed Karl Böhm starting in September.
- July – At the Berkshire Festival, Benny Goodman records both the Clarinet Concerto (with the Boston Symphony Orchestra, conducted by Charles Münch) and the Quintet for Clarinet and Strings (with the Boston Symphony String Quartet) by Wolfgang Amadeus Mozart, for RCA Victor. The recordings are made in stereo, though first released in 1957 only in a monaural mixdown (the first stereo issue is in 1968).
- July 11–22 – The Darmstädter Ferienkurse are held in Darmstadt with a series of lectures by Theodor W. Adorno, two public discussions of the new medium of electronic music, and world premieres of works by (amongst others) Richard Rodney Bennett, Pierre Boulez, Jacques Calonne, Aldo Clementi, Luc Ferrari, Alexander Goehr, Bengt Hambraeus, Hans Werner Henze, Bruno Maderna, Henri Pousseur, and Karlheinz Stockhausen.
- July 17 – The Metropolitan Opera Association announces the cancellation of its 1956–57 season because of a labor dispute.
- July 19 – The American Guild of Musical Artists and the Metropolitan Opera Association announce a resolution of their dispute, so that the season will begin on October 29 as originally planned.
- July 22 – The first UK Albums Chart is published, in Record Mirror; Frank Sinatra's Songs for Swingin' Lovers! tops it for the first two weeks.
- Summer – John Lennon forms a skiffle group, the Quarrymen, with friends from Quarry Bank High School in Liverpool, England, originally Eric Griffiths and Pete Shotton.
- August–September – Maria Callas makes studio recordings of Giuseppe Verdi's, Il trovatore, conducted by Herbert von Karajan, Giacomo Puccini's, La bohème, conducted by Antonino Votto, and Giuseppe Verdi's, Un ballo in maschera, also conducted by Votto, for EMI.
- September 5 – The posthumous world première of Sergei Prokofiev's Piano Concerto No. 4 (for the left hand), composed in 1931, takes place in Berlin, performed by Siegfried Rapp and the West Berlin Radio Symphony Orchestra, conducted by Martin Rich.
- September 9 – Elvis Presley appears on The Ed Sullivan Show.
- October 6 - Lawrence Welk signs with Ben Selvin at RCA Thesaurus to broadcast The New Lawrence Welk Show on national radio networks.
- October 10–20 – First Warsaw Autumn International Festival of Contemporary Music.
- October 14 – Leopold Stokowski conducts the Symphony of the Air in three world premières at Carnegie Hall: Charles Ives's Browning Overture, Alan Hovhaness's Symphony No. 3, and Kurt Leimer's Piano Concerto No. 4.
- October 16 – The New York Philharmonic-Symphony Orchestra announces that, at the request of their music director, Dimitri Mitropoulos, they have engaged Leonard Bernstein to share the direction of the orchestra with Mitropoulos for the 1957–58 season.
- October 20–21 – The Donaueschinger Musiktage new-music festival takes place with a memorial concert featuring the music of Arthur Honegger, and also concerts with compositions of (amongst others) Luciano Berio, Pierre Boulez, Claude Debussy, Gottfried von Einem, Hans Werner Henze, Roman Haubenstock-Ramati, Maurice Jarre, Olivier Messiaen, and Igor Stravinsky
- October 22 – Sigurd Rascher and the Chattanooga Symphony Orchestra open their 1956–57 season with a concert including the world première of Carl Anton Wirth's Concerto for Saxophone and Orchestra.
- October 29 – In New York, the Metropolitan Opera's seventy-second season opens with a revival of Bellini's Norma, made especially for Maria Callas's Metropolitan debut in the title role.
- November 5
  - Nat King Cole becomes the first major black performer to host a variety show on US national television, when The Nat King Cole Show is broadcast.
  - Royal Performance in the presence of Queen Elizabeth II of the United Kingdom, by Liberace, in London.
- November 13 – The first of a series of Hoffnung Music Festival Concerts takes place at the Royal Festival Hall, in London.
- November 28 – Yoko Ono, recently divorced from Japanese composer Toshi Ichiyanagi, marries Anthony Cox.
- December 4 – Elvis Presley, Jerry Lee Lewis, Carl Perkins and Johnny Cash record together at Sun Studios in Memphis, Tennessee. The sessions are later released under the name "the Million Dollar Quartet"
- December 19 – Breaking the record for the highest number of concurrent singles by a single artist, Elvis Presley holds 9 positions on the Billboard Hot 100 chart. Presley would hold the record until 1964 when the Beatles hold 14 positions on the chart.
- Pierre Gabaye wins the Prix de Rome in the Musical Composition category.
- Gene Vincent signs a publishing contract with Bill Lowery.
- Dalida's musical career begins on Barclay Records in Europe as (one of) the first biggest "world pop star" and sex symbol and she is the first artist to have her photo on a single in France. 175 000 copies of her big hits "Bambino" are sold in a few weeks.
- Chrysler Corporation provides an in-car turntable 16 2/3 rpm record player with 7-inch ultramicrogroove records in its luxury make, the Imperial. The machine was developed by Peter Carl Goldmark – the man who invented the 33 1/3 rpm long playing (LP) record format.
- Cameo-Parkway Records is formed in Philadelphia, Pennsylvania, by Kal Mann and Bernie Lowe.
- Foundation of the Korean piano brand Young Chang.
- Cleveland television station WEWS-TV launches Polka Varieties, a regular Sunday-afternoon, hour-long program devoted to polka music; Frank Yankovic leads the original band to perform on the show.
- Regency Records is founded in Toronto, Canada.

== Albums released ==
- Alors raconte – Gilbert Bécaud
- The Ames Brothers with Hugo Winterhalter – Ames Brothers and Hugo Winterhalter
- Asia Minor – Machito and his Afro-Cubans
- Bing Sings Whilst Bregman Swings – Bing Crosby
- Black Coffee – Peggy Lee
- Bluejean Bop! – Gene Vincent
- Blue Rose – Rosemary Clooney
- The Boss of the Blues – Big Joe Turner
- Calendar Girl – Julie London
- Calypso – Harry Belafonte, first LP to sell over a million copies
- The Champ – Jimmy Smith
- Charles Aznavour chante Charles Aznavour, vol. 3 – Charles Aznavour
- Chet Baker Sings – Chet Baker
- Chris Connor – Chris Connor
- Clifford Brown and Max Roach at Basin Street – Clifford Brown and Max Roach
- The Complete Porgy and Bess – Original Broadway Cast
- Count Basie Swings, Joe Williams Sings – Joe Williams
- Day by Day – Doris Day
- Dinner in Colombia – Aldemaro Romero
- Dinner Music for People Who Aren't Very Hungry – Spike Jones
- Django – Modern Jazz Quartet
- Ella and Louis – Ella Fitzgerald and Louis Armstrong
- Ella Fitzgerald Sings the Cole Porter Songbook – Ella Fitzgerald
- Ella Fitzgerald Sings the Rodgers & Hart Songbook – Ella Fitzgerald
- Ellington at Newport – Duke Ellington
- Elvis – Elvis Presley
- Elvis Presley – Elvis Presley (debut)
- Exactly Like You – the Ames Brothers
- Favorite Cowboy Songs – Sons of the Pioneers
- Finger Style Guitar – Chet Atkins
- Flight to Romance – Aldemaro Romero
- Fontessa – Modern Jazz Quartet
- The Four Aces – the Four Aces
- Frank Sinatra Conducts Tone Poems of Color – Frank Sinatra
- Frankie Laine and the Four Lads – Frankie Laine
- The Genius of Bud Powell – Bud Powell
- A Girl Named Jo – Jo Stafford
- Heimweh – Freddy Quinn
- The Hi-Fi Nightingale – Caterina Valente
- High Society – Frank Sinatra, Bing Crosby, Louis Armstrong & Celeste Holm
- Holding Hands at Midnight – Dinah Shore
- Howdy! – Pat Boone
- Improvisations – Stéphane Grappelli
- In the Land of Hi-Fi – Patti Page
- Informal Jazz – Elmo Hope
- Je me suis fait tout petit – Georges Brassens
- The Lark in the Morning – Liam Clancy and Tommy Makem
- Latin Kick – Cal Tjader
- Lennie Tristano – Lennie Tristano
- Lonely Girl – Julie London
- Love Songs Sung – Dinah Shore
- Lullaby Time – Bing Crosby
- Manhattan Tower – Patti Page
- Max Roach + 4 – Max Roach
- Miles Davis Volume 1 – Miles Davis
- Miles Davis Volume 2 – Miles Davis
- Miles: The New Miles Davis Quintet – Miles Davis
- Miles Davis with Horns – Miles Davis
- The Misty Miss Christy – June Christy
- Moondog – Moondog
- Music for Two in Love – Patti Page
- New Jazz Conceptions – Bill Evans
- Nursery Days – Woody Guthrie
- Odetta Sings Ballads and Blues – Odetta
- On the Sunny Side – the Four Lads
- Page Three – Easy Listening – Patti Page
- Pithecanthropus Erectus – Charles Mingus
- The Platters – the Platters
- Playboys – Chet Baker and Art Pepper
- Rock 'n' Roll Stage Show – Bill Haley & His Comets
- Rock, Rock, Rock – Various Artists
- Singin' and Swingin' – the Mills Brothers
- Ski Trails – Jo Stafford
- Songs for Swingin' Lovers! – Frank Sinatra
- Songs I Wish I Had Sung the First Time Around – Bing Crosby
- Songs of Faith – Aretha Franklin
- Songs to Grow on for Mother and Child – Woody Guthrie
- Squeeze Play – John Serry, Sr.
- That Towering Feeling! – Vic Damone
- The Teenagers Featuring Frankie Lymon – the Teenagers Featuring Frankie Lymon
- Tenor Madness – Sonny Rollins
- This Is Sinatra! – Frank Sinatra
- Three Ragas – Ravi Shankar
- Toshiko – Her Trio, Her Quartet – Toshiko Akiyoshi
- The Toshiko Trio – Toshiko Akiyoshi
- Tragic Songs of Life – the Louvin Brothers
- The Unique Thelonious Monk – Thelonious Monk
- Venezuelan Fiesta – Aldemaro Romero
- The Voices of Patti Page – Patti Page
- La Découverte du Brésil, Invocation pour la Défense de la Patrie, Chôros n^{o} 10 – Heitor Villa-Lobos, Chœrs et Orchestre National de la Radiodiffusion Française; Maria Kareska, soprano; Chorale des Jeunesses musicales de France; direction Heitor Villa-Lobos. 2 LPs. Columbia (France) FCX 602 & 603
- Whims of Chambers – Paul Chambers
- The Wildest! – Louis Prima
- Work Time – Sonny Rollins
- You Go to My Head – Patti Page

== Biggest hit singles ==
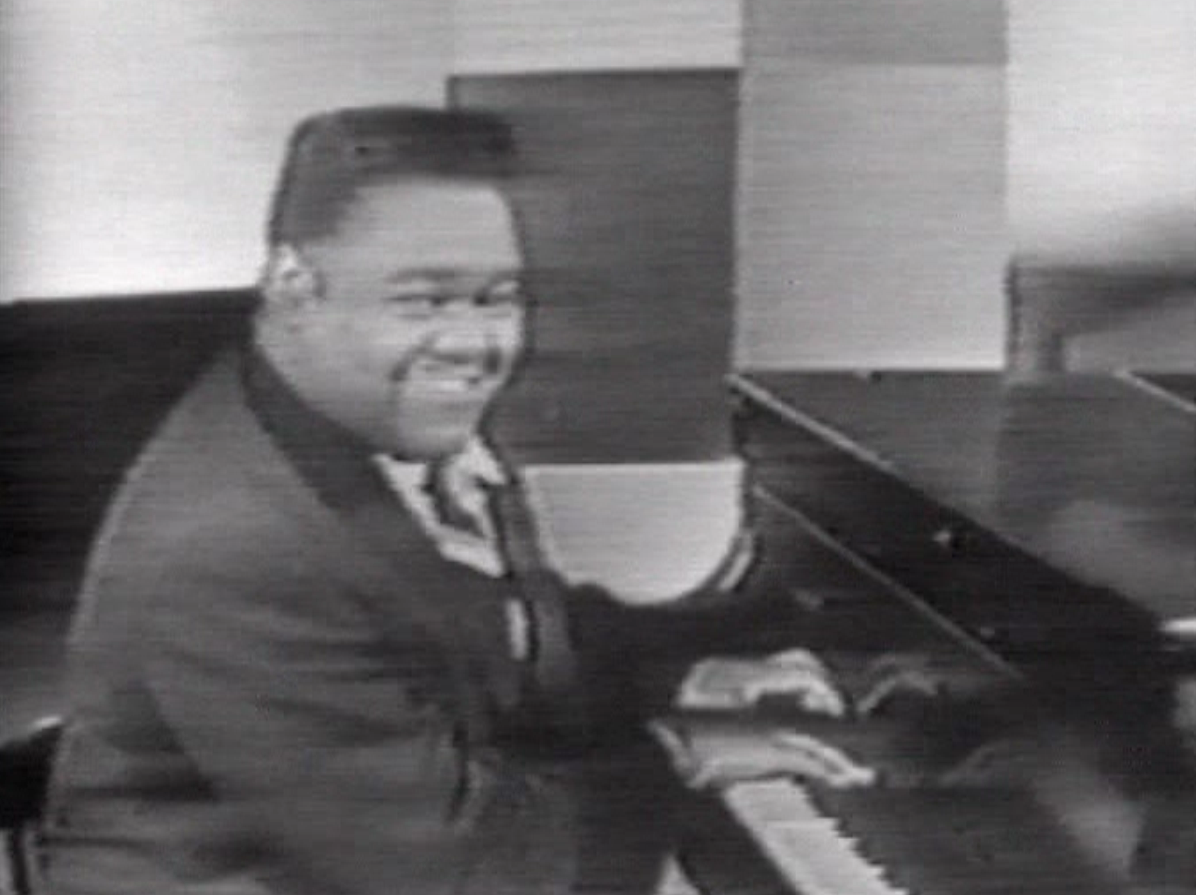
Hitmaker Fats Domino in 1956

The following songs achieved the highest chart positions in the charts of 1956.

#	Artist	Title	Year	Country	Chart entries
1	Doris Day	Que Sera, Sera (Whatever Will Be, Will Be)	1956	US	UK 1 – Jun 1956 (22 weeks), Flanders 1 – Dec 1956 (6 months), Radio Luxembourg sheet music 1 for 5 weeks – Sep 1956, Record Mirror 1 for 6 weeks – Aug 1956, Australia 1 for 8 weeks – Sep 1956, France 1 for 1 week – Jan 1957, Oscar in 1956 (film 'The Man Who Knew Too Much'), US Billboard 2 – Jun 1956 (27 weeks), US CashBox 3 – Jun 1956 (25 weeks), Italy 4 of 1957, US CashBox 5 of 1956, Your Hit Parade 5 of 1956, Brazil 16 of 1957, US BB 23 of 1956, RYM 23 of 1956, POP 23 of 1956, Europe 27 of the 1950s (1956), UKMIX 34, AFI 48, RIAA 165
2	Fats Domino	Blueberry Hill	1956	US	Belgium 1 – Jun 1976 (10 weeks), Grammy Hall of Fame in 1987 (1956), US BB 2 of 1957, Holland 2 – Jun 1976 (10 weeks), POP 2 of 1957, Europe 3 of the 1950s (1956), US Billboard 4 – Sep 1956 (27 weeks), US CashBox 4 – Oct 1956 (13 weeks), RYM 5 of 1956, UK 6 – Dec 1956 (15 weeks), Flanders 7 – Mar 1957 (5 months), DDD 8 of 1956, France 10 – May 1976 (1 week), D.Marsh 17 of 1956, RIAA 18, nuTsie 31 of 1950s, US CashBox 39 of 1956, DMDB 55 (1956), Brazil 74 of 1957, Rolling Stone 81, Acclaimed 153 (1956), one of the Rock and Roll Hall of Fame 500
3	Elvis Presley	Hound Dog	1956	US	US Billboard 1 – Aug 1956 (28 weeks), US CashBox 1 – Jul 1956 (21 weeks), Grammy Hall of Fame in 1988 (1956), RYM 1 of 1956, DDD 1 of 1956, US 4 X Platinum (certified by RIAA in Jul 1999), UK 2 – Sep 1956 (25 weeks), US BB 2 of 1956, POP 2 of 1956, nuTsie 8 of 1950s, D.Marsh 11 of 1956, Flanders 13 – Nov 1956 (2 months), US CashBox 15 of 1956, UKMIX 15, Brazil 17 of 1956, Rolling Stone 19, DMDB 20 (1956), Acclaimed 52 (1956), Europe 57 of the 1950s (1956), Scrobulate 60 of oldies, RIAA 68, Italy 72 of 1956, WXPN 692, Global 7 (10 M sold) – 1956, Party 281 of 1999
4	Elvis Presley	Heartbreak Hotel	1956	US	US Billboard 1 – Mar 1956 (27 weeks), US CashBox 1 – Mar 1956 (21 weeks), Grammy Hall of Fame in 1995 (1956), D.Marsh 1 of 1956, US 2 X Platinum (certified by RIAA in Jul 1999), UK 2 – May 1956 (22 weeks), RYM 2 of 1956, 4 in 2FM list, US CashBox 6 of 1956, Your Hit Parade 6 of 1956, Europe 7 of the 1950s (1956), Scrobulate 13 of rock & roll, DDD 15 of 1956, Acclaimed 19 (1956), US BB 22 of 1956, UKMIX 22, POP 22 of 1956, DMDB 26 (1956), Brazil 37 of 1956, Rolling Stone 45, nuTsie 45 of 1950s, Italy 49 of 1956, RIAA 87, WXPN 730, one of the Rock and Roll Hall of Fame 500
5	Elvis Presley	Don't Be Cruel	1956	US	US Billboard 1 – Aug 1956 (27 weeks), US CashBox 1 – Aug 1956 (21 weeks), US CashBox 1 of 1956, Your Hit Parade 1 of 1956, Grammy Hall of Fame in 2002 (1956), RYM 1 of 1956, DDD 4 of 1956, D.Marsh 11 of 1956, DMDB 12 (1956), Europe 14 of the 1950s (1956), nuTsie 15 of 1950s, Belgium 17 – Sep 1977 (2 weeks), US BB 19 of 1956, Brazil 19 of 1956, POP 19 of 1956, UK 24 – Jun 1978 (12 weeks), RIAA 68, Acclaimed 74 (1956), Italy 92 of 1958, Rolling Stone 197, WXPN 543

== US No. 1 hit singles ==
These singles reached the top of US Billboard magazine's charts in 1956.

First week	Number of weeks	Title	Artist
January 14, 1956	5	"Memories Are Made of This"	Dean Martin
February 18, 1956	1	"Rock and Roll Waltz"	Kay Starr
February 25, 1956	4	"Lisbon Antigua"	Nelson Riddle
March 24, 1956	4	"The Poor People of Paris"	Les Baxter
April 21, 1956	8	"Heartbreak Hotel"	Elvis Presley
June 16, 1956	6	"The Wayward Wind"	Gogi Grant
July 28, 1956	1	"I Want You, I Need You, I Love You"	Elvis Presley
August 4, 1956	2	"My Prayer"	The Platters
August 18, 1956	11	"Don't Be Cruel/Hound Dog"	Elvis Presley
November 3, 1956	5	"Love Me Tender"	Elvis Presley
December 8, 1956	9	"Singing the Blues"	Guy Mitchell

== Top hits on record ==
- "The ABC's of Love" – Frankie Lymon and the Teenagers
- "Ain't Got No Home" – Clarence "Frogman" Henry
- "Allegheny Moon" – Patti Page
- "And This Is My Beloved" – Mario Lanza
- "Any Way You Want Me" – Elvis Presley
- "Are You Satisfied?" – Rusty Draper
- "Bambino" – Dalida
- "Be-Bop-A-Lula" – Gene Vincent and His Blue Caps
- "Blue Suede Shoes" – Carl Perkins
- "Blueberry Hill" – Fats Domino
- "Canadian Sunset" – Andy Williams
- "C'est Noël" – Fernandel
- "Chain Gang" – Bobby Scott
- "Che bambola" – Fred Buscaglione (Italy)
- "Church Bells May Ring" recorded by
  - The Willows
  - The Diamonds
- "Confidential" – Sonny Knight
- "Don't Be Cruel" – Elvis Presley
- "Don't Forbid Me" – Pat Boone
- "The Fool" – Sanford Clark
- "Friendly Persuasion (Thee I Love)" – Pat Boone
- "Fujiyama Mama" – Wanda Jackson
- "Glad Rag Doll" – Kay Starr
- "Gonna Get Along Without You Now" – Patience and Prudence
- "The Great Pretender" – the Platters
- "The Green Door" – Jim Lowe
- "Happiness is a Thing Called Joe" – Georgia Gibbs
- "Happiness Street" recorded by
  - Georgia Gibbs
  - Tony Bennett
- "The Happy Whistler" – Don Robertson
- "Heartbreak Hotel" – Elvis Presley
- "Hell Hath No Fury" – Frankie Laine
- "Hot Dog ! That Made Him Mad" – Wanda Jackson
- "Hound Dog" – Elvis Presley
- "(How Little It Matters) How Little We Know" – Frank Sinatra
- "I Almost Lost My Mind" – Pat Boone
- "I Got It Bad (And That Ain't Good)" – Georgia Gibbs
- "I Gotta Get Myself a Woman" - the Drifters
- "I Promise to Remember" – Frankie Lymon and the Teenagers
- "I Remember You" – Doris Day
- "I Walk the Line" – Johnny Cash
- "I Want to Be Loved" – Johnnie Ray
- "I Want You, I Need You, I Love You" – Elvis Presley
- "I Want You to Be My Girl" – the Teenagers Featuring Frankie Lymon
- "I Was the One" – Elvis Presley
- "I'll Be Home" – Pat Boone
- "Innamorata" – Dean Martin
- "It's Almost Tomorrow" – the Dream Weavers
- "I've Got You Under My Skin" – Frank Sinatra
- "Ivory Tower" – Cathy Carr
- "Just Walkin' in the Rain" – Johnnie Ray
- "Lonesome Road" – Georgia Gibbs
- "Long Tall Sally" – Little Richard
- "Love Me Tender" – Elvis Presley
- "Mama from the Train" – Patti Page
- "The Man That Got Away" – Georgia Gibbs
- "Memories Are Made Of This" – Dean Martin
- "Miracle of Love" – Eileen Rodgers
- "My Blue Heaven" – Fats Domino
- "My Prayer" – the Platters
- "No, Not Much" – the Four Lads
- "On the Road to Mandalay" – Frankie Laine
- "On the Street Where You Live" – Vic Damone
- "Picnic" – the McGuire Sisters
- "Refrain" – Lys Assia
- "Roll Over Beethoven" – Chuck Berry
- "See You Later Alligator" – Bill Haley and His Comets
- "Shake a Hand" – Johnnie Ray
- "Siempre hace frío" – Cuco Sánchez
- "Singing the Blues" – Guy Mitchell
- "Soft Summer Breeze" – Eddie Heywood
- "Song for a Summer Night" – Mitch Miller and His Orchestra and Chorus
- "Standing on the Corner" – the Four Lads
- "Suddenly There's a Valley" – Gogi Grant
- "A Tear Fell" – Teresa Brewer
- "That's All There Is to That" – Nat King Cole
- "(Themes from) The Man with the Golden Arm" – Richard Maltby & His Orchestra
- "Tonight You Belong to Me" – Patience and Prudence
- "True Love" Grace Kelly and Bing Crosby
- "Tutti-Frutti" – Little Richard
- "Twenty Flight Rock" – Eddie Cochran
- "Walk Hand in Hand" – Tony Martin
- "The Wayward Wind" – Gogi Grant
- "Whatever Will Be, Will Be (Que Sera, Sera)" – Doris Day
- "Who Can Explain?" – Frankie Lymon and the Teenagers
- "Why Do Fools Fall in Love" – the Teenagers featuring Frankie Lymon
- "Without Him" – Frankie Laine
- "You Don't Know Me" – Jerry Vale

== Top R&B and country hits on record ==
- "Blue Suede Shoes" – Carl Perkins
- "A Casual Look" – Six Teens
- "Cry! Cry! Cry!" – Johnny Cash
- "Get Rhythm" – Johnny Cash
- "I Walk the Line" – Johnny Cash
- "In the Still of the Night" – Five Satins
- "It's Too Late" – Chuck Willis
- "I've Loved and Lost Again" – Patsy Cline
- "Jambalaya (On the Bayou)" – Brenda Lee
- "Lucky Lips" – Ruth Brown
- "My Pink Cadillac" – Hal Willis
- "One Kiss Led to Another" – the Coasters
- "Ooby Dooby" – Roy Orbison
- "Tra La La" – LaVern Baker
- "Treasure of Love" – Clyde McPhatter and the Drifters

== Published popular music ==
- "After the Lights Go Down Low" w.m. Alan White & Leroy Lovett
- "Ain't Got No Home" w.m. Clarence Henry
- "Allegheny Moon" w.m. Al Hoffman & Dick Manning
- "Anastasia" w. Paul Francis Webster m. Alfred Newman
- "Any Way You Want Me (That's How I Will Be)" w.m. Aaron Schroeder & Cliff Owens
- "Around the World" w. Harold Adamson m. Victor Young
- "The Banana Boat Song" trad arr. Alan Arkin, Bob Carey & Erik Darling
- "Be-Bop-A-Lula" w.m. Tex Davis & Gene Vincent
- "Big D" w.m. Frank Loesser
- "The Birds and the Bees", Mack David, Harry Warren
- "Bo Weevil" w.m. Dave Bartholomew & Antoine "Fats" Domino
- "Boppin' the Blues" w.m. Carl Perkins & Howard Griffin
- "Born to Be with You" w.m. Don Robertson
- "Brown Eyed Handsome Man", Chuck Berry
- "The Bus Stop Song" (aka "A Paper Of Pins") w.m. Ken Darby
- "Canadian Sunset" w. Norman Gimbel m. Eddie Heywood
- "Chain Gang" w.m. Sol Quasha & Herb Yakus
- "Cindy, Oh Cindy" w.m. Bob Barron & Burt Long
- "Don't Be Cruel" w.m. Otis Blackwell & Elvis Presley
- "Don't Forbid Me" w.m. Charles Singleton
- "Eddie My Love", A. Collins, M. Davis, S. Ling
- "Fever" w.m. Eddie Cooley & John Davenport
- "Fina estampa" w.m. Chabuca Granda
- "The Flying Saucer" w. Bill Buchanan & Dickie Goodman
- "Fools Fall In Love" w.m. Jerry Leiber & Mike Stoller
- "Friendly Persuasion" w. Paul Francis Webster m. Dimitri Tiomkin
- "The Garden of Eden" w.m. Dennise Haas Norwood
- "Get Me to the Church on Time" w. Alan Jay Lerner m. Frederick Loewe. Introduced by Stanley Holloway in the musical My Fair Lady and also performed by Holloway in the 1964 film.
- "Glendora" w.m. Ray Stanley
- "Glitter and Be Gay" w. Richard Wilbut m. Leonard Bernstein
- "The Gnu", Michael Flanders & Donald Swann
- "Good Golly, Miss Molly" w.m. John Marascalco & Robert Blackwell
- "Goodnight My Love" G. Motola, J. Marascalco
- "The Green Door" w. Marvin Moore m. Bob Davie
- "Guaglione" w. Nicola "Nisa" Salerno m. Giuseppe Fanciulli
- "The Happy Whistler" m. Don Robertson
- "Heartbreak Hotel" w.m. Mae Boren Axton, Tommy Durden & Elvis Presley
- "Hey! Jealous Lover" w.m. Sammy Cahn, Kay Twomey & Bee Walker
- "High Society Calypso" w.m. Cole Porter
- "The Hippopotamus", Michael Flanders & Donald Swann
- "Honky Tonk" w. Henry Glover m. Bill Doggett, Billy Butler, Shep Shepherd & Clifford Scott
- "Hot Diggity" w. m.(adapt) Al Hoffman & Dick Manning
- "A House with Love in It" w. Sylvia Dee m. Sid Lippman
- "I Could Have Danced All Night" w. Alan Jay Lerner m. Frederick Loewe. Introduced by Julie Andrews in the musical My Fair Lady. Performed in the 1964 film by Marni Nixon dubbing for Audrey Hepburn.
- "I Dreamed" w. Marvin Moore m. Charles Grean
- "I Love You, Samantha" w.m. Cole Porter Introduced by Bing Crosby in the film High Society.
- "I Put a Spell on You" w.m. Jay Hawkins & Herb Slotkin
- "I Walk the Line" w.m. Johnny Cash
- "I Want You, I Need You, I Love You" w. Maurice Mysels m. Ira Kosloff
- "I Was the One" w.m. Claude Demetrius, Bill Peppers, Hal Blair, Aaron Schroeder
- "I'm an Ordinary Man" w. Alan Jay Lerner m. Frederick Loewe Introduced by Rex Harrison in the musical My Fair Lady
- "I'm Walkin'" w.m. Antoine "Fats" Domino & Dave Bartholomew
- "I'm Walking Backwards For Christmas", Spike Milligan, T. Carbone
- "In the Still of the Nite" w.m. Fred Parris
- "It Only Hurts For A Little While" w. Mack David m. Fred Spielman
- "It's Not For Me To Say" w. Al Stillman m. Robert Allen
- "I've Grown Accustomed To Her Face" w. Alan Jay Lerner m. Frederick Loewe. Introduced by Rex Harrison in the musical My Fair Lady.
- "Ivory Tower" w.m. Jack Fulton & Lois Steele
- "Joey, Joey, Joey" w.m. Frank Loesser
- "Jubilation T. Cornpone" w. Johnny Mercer m. Gene de Paul. Introduced by Stubby Kaye in the musical Li'l Abner.
- "Juke Box Baby" w. Noel Sherman m. Joe Sherman
- "Just In Time" w. Betty Comden & Adolph Green m. Jule Styne. Introduced by Judy Holliday and Sydney Chaplin in the musical Bells Are Ringing
- "Knee Deep in the Blues" w.m. Melvin Endsley
- "Lay Down Your Arms" w. (English) Paddy Roberts, (Swedish) Ake Gerhard m. Ake Gerhard & Leon Land
- "Let the Good Times Roll" w.m. Leonard Lee
- "Long Tall Sally" w.m. Enotris Johnson, Richard Penniman & Robert A. Blackwell
- "Look Homeward Angel" w.m. Wally Gold
- "Love Me Tender" w. Elvis Presley & Vera Matson m. George R. Poulton
- "Love Me" w.m. Jerry Leiber & Mike Stoller
- "Lucky Lips" w.m. Jerry Leiber & Mike Stoller
- "(You've Got) The Magic Touch" w.m. Buck Ram
- "Mama from the Train" w.m. Irving Gordon
- "Mama, Teach Me To Dance" w.m. Al Hoffman & Dick Manning
- "Mangos" w.m. Sid Wayne & Dee Libbey
- "Maria" w. Stephen Sondheim m. Leonard Bernstein
- "Marianne" w.m. Terry Gilkyson, Frank Miller & Richard Dehr
- "Mary's Boy Child" w.m. Jester Hairston
- "Mind If I Make Love to You?" w.m. Cole Porter. Introduced by Frank Sinatra in the film High Society
- "Moonlight Gambler" w. Bob Hilliard m. Philip Springer
- "More" w. Tom Glazer m. Alex Alstone
- "The Most Happy Fella" w.m. Frank Loesser
- "Mutual Admiration Society" w. Matt Dubey m. Harold Karr. Introduced by Ethel Merman and Virginia Gibson in the musical Happy Hunting
- "My Lucky Charm", Sammy Cahn & Nicholas Brodszky
- "Now You Has Jazz" w.m. Cole Porter. Introduced by Bing Crosby and Louis Armstrong in the film High Society.
- "Oh What a Nite" w.m. Marvin Junior & John Funches
- "On the Street Where You Live" w. Alan Jay Lerner m. Frederick Loewe. Introduced by John Michael King in the musical My Fair Lady.
- "Pardners" w. Sammy Cahn m. Jimmy Van Heusen. Introduced by Dean Martin and Jerry Lewis in the film of the same name
- "The Party's Over" w. Betty Comden & Adolph Green m. Jule Styne. Introduced by Judy Holliday in the musical Bells Are Ringing.
- "The Portuguese Washerwomen" (Original title "Las Lavanderas De Portugal") m. André Popp & Roger Lucchesi
- "Whatever Will Be, Will Be (Que Sera, Sera)" w.m. Jay Livingston & Ray Evans
- "The Rain in Spain" w. Alan Jay Lerner m. Frederick Loewe. Introduced by Julie Andrews, Rex Harrison and Robert Coote in the musical My Fair Lady.
- "Rockin' the Anvil" m. John Serry Sr. arranged for accordion quartet
- "Rock with the Caveman", Steele, Pratt, Lionel Bart, Frank Chacksfield
- "Roll Over Beethoven" w.m. Chuck Berry
- "A Rose and a Baby Ruth" w.m. John D. Loudermilk
- "Round and Round" w.m. Lou Stallman & Joe Shapiro
- "St. Therese of the Roses" w.m. Remus Harris and Arthur Strauss
- "Singing the Blues" w.m. Melvin Endsley
- "Soft Summer Breeze" w. Judy Spencer m. Eddie Heywood
- "Somebody Up There Likes Me" w. Sammy Cahn m. Bronislau Kaper
- "Somebody Somewhere" w.m. Frank Loesser
- "Song for a Summer Night" w.m. Robert Allen
- "Standing on the Corner" w.m. Frank Loesser. Introduced by Shorty Long, Alan Gilbert, John Henson and Roy Lazarus in the musical The Most Happy Fella.
- "A Sweet Old Fashioned Girl" w.m. Bob Merrill
- "A Tear Fell" w.m. Eugene Randolph & Dorian Burton
- "Teen-Age Crush" w.m. Audrey Allison & Joe Allison
- "Theme from Picnic" w. Steve Allen m. George Duning
- "This Could Be the Start of Something" w.m. Steve Allen
- "A Thousand Miles Away", J. Shephard, N. H. Miller
- "Too Close For Comfort" w. Larry Holofcener & George David Weiss m. Jerry Bock
- "Too Much" w.m. Lee Rosenberg & Bernard Weinman
- "Transfusion" w.m. Jimmy Drake
- "True Love" w.m. Cole Porter. Introduced by Bing Crosby and Grace Kelly in the film High Society.
- "Two Different Worlds" w. Sid Wayne m. Al Frisch
- "Walk Hand In Hand" w.m. Johnny Cowell
- "The Wayward Wind" w.m. Stanley Lebowsky & Herb Newman
- "When Sunny Gets Blue" w. Jack Segal m. Marvin Fisher
- "Who Needs You" w. Al Stillman m. Robert Allen
- "Who Wants To Be A Millionaire?" w.m. Cole Porter. Introduced by Celeste Holm and Frank Sinatra in the film High Society.
- "With a Little Bit of Luck" w. Alan Jay Lerner m. Frederick Loewe. Introduced by Stanley Holloway in the musical My Fair Lady.
- "Wouldn't It Be Loverly" w. Alan Jay Lerner m. Frederick Loewe. Introduced by Julie Andrews in the musical My Fair Lady. Performed in the 1964 film by Marni Nixon dubbing for Audrey Hepburn.
- "Written on the Wind" w.m. Sammy Cahn & Victor Young
- "Ying Tong Song" w.m. Spike Milligan
- "Young Love" w.m. Carole Joyner & Ric Cartey

== Classical music ==
=== Premieres ===
Composer	Composition	Date	Location	Performers
Arnold, Malcolm	A Grand, Grand Overture, Op. 57	1956-11-13	London, Hoffnung Music Festival	Morley College Symphony – Arnold
Baird, Tadeusz	Cassazione	1956-10-21	Warsaw Autumn	Warsaw Philharmonic – Rowicki
Barber, Samuel	Summer Music	1956-03-20	Detroit, Chamber Music Society of Detroit	Members of the Detroit Symphony
Barraqué, Jean	Séquence	1956-03-10	Paris	Semser / Domaine musical – Albert
Berio, Luciano	Variazione sull'aria di Papageno (Note: Variazione sull'aria di Papageno was part of Divertimento für Mozart, an omnibus composition by 12 different composers.)	1956-10-21	Donaueschingen Festival, Germany	Lemser, Meiser / SWF Radio Symphony – Rosbaud
Bliss, Arthur	Edinburgh Overture	1956-08-20	Edinburgh International Festival	Royal Philharmonic – Bliss
Cage, John	Radio Music	1956-05-30	New York City	Ajemain, Cage, Sultan, Tudor, Juilliard Quartet
Cowell, Henry	Lines from the Dead Sea Scrolls	1956-07-07	Lenox, Massachusetts	Yale Glee Club, Boston Symphony – Boss
Cowell, Henry	String Quartet No. 5	1956-10-05	Cleveland	Juilliard Quartet
Cowell, Henry	Variations for Orchestra	1956-11-23	Cincinnati	Cincinnati Symphony – Johnson
Dallapiccola, Luigi	Cinque canti per baritono e alcuni strumenti	1956-11-30	Washington DC	Fuller / [unknown ensemble and conductor]
Guridi, Jesús	Homenaje a Walt Disney	1956-10-03	Alicante, Spain	Bayona / Barcelona Municipal Orchestra – Toldrà
Henze, Hans Werner	Concerto per il Marigny	1956-03-10	Paris	Loriod / Domaine Musical – Albert, Rudolf
Henze, Hans Werner	Symphonic Studies	1956-02-14	Hamburg	NDR Symphony – Martinon
Hovhaness, Alan	Symphony No. 3	1956-10-14	New York City	Symphony of the Air – Stokowski
Ives, Charles	Robert Browning Overture	1956-10-14	New York City	Symphony of the Air – Stokowski
Jacob, Gordon	Oboe Concerto No. 2	1956-04-25	Leningrad	Goossens / [unknown orchestra] – Raybould
Khachaturian, Aram	Spartacus	1956-12-27	Leningrad	
Leimer, Kurt	Piano Concerto No. 4	1956-10-14	New York City	Symphony of the Air – Stokowski
Martin, Frank	Etudes for Strings	1956-11-23	Basel	Basel Chamber Orchestra – Sacher
Martinů, Bohuslav	Concerto for Oboe and Small Orchestra	1956-08-08	Melbourne, Cultural Olympiad	Tancibudek / Sydney Symphony – Schmidt-Isserstedt
Martinů, Bohuslav	Piano Concerto No. 4, Incantation	1956-10-04	New York City	Firkusny / Symphony of the Air – Stokowski
Martinů, Bohuslav	The Frescoes of Piero della Francesca	1956-08-26	Salzburg Festival	Vienna Philharmonic – Kubelik
Messiaen, Olivier	Oiseaux exotiques	1956-03-10	Paris	Loriod / Domaine Musical – Albert
Nono, Luigi	Il canto sospeso	1956-10-24	Cologne, WDR Musik der Zeit	Cologne Radio Symphony – Scherchen
Pettersson, Allan	Symphony No. 3	1956-11-19	Gothenburg, Sweden	Gothenburg Symphony – Mann
Piston, Walter	Symphony No. 5	1956-02-24	New York City	Juilliard Orchestra – Morel
Rainier, Priaulx	Requiem	1956-04-15	London	Pears / Purcell Singers – Holst
Rodrigo, Joaquín	Concierto serenata for harp and orchestra	1956-09-11	Madrid	Zabaleta / Spanish National Orchestra – Kletzki
Rubbra, Edmund	Piano Concerto	1956-03-21	London	Matthews / BBC Symphony – Sargent
Schoenberg, Arnold	O Du mein Gott, alle Völker preisen Dich (Modern Psalm, Op. 50c)	1956-05-30	Cologne, Westdeutscher Rundfunk, Musik der Zeit	WDR Choir – [conductor not known]
Sessions, Roger	Idyll of Theocritus	1956-01-14	Louisville, Kentucky	Nossaman / Louisville Orchestra – Whitney
Sessions, Roger	Piano Concerto	1956-02-10	New York City	Webster / Juilliard Orchestra – Morel
Shebalin, Vissarion	Viola Sonata	1956-10-26	Moscow	D. Shebalin, Edlina
Shostakovich, Dmitri	String Quartet No. 6	1956-10-07	Leningrad	Beethoven Quartet
Stockhausen, Karlheinz	Gesang der Jünglinge	1956-05-30	Cologne, Westdeutscher Rundfunk, Musik der Zeit	electronic music
Stockhausen, Karlheinz	Zeitmaße for 5 woodwinds (revised version)	1956-12-15	Paris	Domaine musical – Boulez
Tippett, Michael	Piano Concerto	1956-10-30	Birmingham, UK	Kentner / City of Birmingham Symphony – Schwarz
Vaughan Williams, Ralph	Symphony No. 8	1956-05-02	Manchester, UK	Hallé Orchestra – Barbirolli
Villa-Lobos, Heitor	Guitar Concerto	1956-02-06	Houston	Segovia / Houston Symphony – Villa-Lobos
Walton, William	Johannesburg Festival Overture	1956-09-25	Johannesburg	SABC Symphony – Sargent

=== Compositions ===
- Hans Erich Apostel –
  - String Quartet No. 2
  - Variationen über drei Volkslieder, for orchestra
- Malcolm Arnold –
  - Concerto No. 2 for Horn and String Orchestra, Op. 58
  - A Grand Grand Overture, Op. 57, for organ, three vacuum cleaners, electric floor polisher in E-flat, four rifles, and orchestra
  - Song of Praise, Op. 55 (text: J. Clare), for unison voices and piano
  - Trio for Violin, Cello, and Piano, Op. 54
- Milton Babbitt – Semi-Simple Variations for piano
- Jan Bach – String Trio
- Samuel Barber – Summer Music for wind quintet
- William Bergsma –
  - The Fortunate Islands, for string orchestra (revised version)
  - March with Trumpets, for band
- Luciano Berio –
  - String Quartet
  - Variazioni "Ein Mädchen oder Weibchen", for two basset horns and strings
- Arthur Bliss –
  - Edinburgh Overture, for orchestra
  - Seek the Lord (anthem), SATB choir and organ
- Reginald Smith Brindle – El Polifemo de Oro
- Benjamin Britten –
  - Antiphon, Op. 56b, for SATB choir and organ
  - The Prince of the Pagodas, Op. 57 (ballet in three acts)
- John Cage –
  - 27′ 10.554″ for a percussionist
  - Music for Piano 53–68
  - Music for Piano 69–84
  - Radio Music, for 1–8 radios
- Niccolò Castiglioni – Symphony No. 1 for soprano and orchestra
- Carlos Chávez – Prometheus Bound, cantata (text: Aeschylus, trans. R. Trevelyan), for alto, tenor, baritone, bass, SATB chorus and orchestra
- Aaron Copland – Variations on a Shaker Melody for symphonic band (from Appalachian Spring)
- Henry Cowell –
  - Ballad, for wind quintet
  - Bounce Dance, for piano
  - Fifteenth Anniversary, for two unspecified treble instruments
  - Lines from the Dead Sea Scrolls, for six-part male choir and orchestra
  - Septet, for five madrigal singers, clarinet, and keyboard
  - String Quartet No. 5
  - Sidney Xmas '56, for violin and piano
  - Sway Dance, for piano
  - Two-Part Invention, for soprano and alto recorders
  - Variations for Orchestra
- Luigi Dallapiccola – Cinque canti (Greek texts, trans. Salvatore Quasimodo), for baritone and eight instruments
- Mario Davidovsky –
  - Three Pieces for Woodwind Quartet
  - Noneti for Nine Instruments
- Peter Maxwell Davies – Sonata for Clarinet and Piano
- Henri Dutilleux – Serenade for La couronne de Marguerite Long
- Herbert Eimert – Fünf Stücke, electronic music
- Hanns Eisler –
  - Horatios Monolog (text: William Shakespeare), for voice and piano
  - Legende von der Entstehung des Buches Taote King (text: Bertolt Brecht), for voice and piano
  - Vier Szenen auf dem Lande (text: E. Strittmatter), children's or female voices and small orchestra
  - Von Wolkenstreifen leicht befangen (text: Johann Wolfgang von Goethe), for voice and piano
  - Zu Brechts Tod "Die Wälder atmen noch", for voice and four horns
- Morton Feldman –
  - Piano Piece A
  - Piano Piece B
  - Pieces (2), for flute, alto flute, horn, trumpet, violin, and cello
  - Pieces (3), for string quartet
- Kenneth Gaburo –
  - "Ad te domine", for SATB choir
  - "Ave Maria", for SATB choir
  - Elegy for a Small Orchestra
  - "Laetentur caeli", for SATB choir
  - String Quartet
  - "Terra tremuit", for SATB choir
- Blas Galindo – Sinfonia breve, for string orchestra
- Roberto Gerhard –
  - Lamparilla Overture for orchestra
  - Sonata for Cello and Piano
  - Songs (7), for soprano or tenor and guitar
- Cecil Armstrong Gibbs – Threnody
- Alberto Ginastera – Suite de danzas criollas, for piano (revised version)
- Henryk Górecki –
  - Three Songs, Op. 3 (song cycle, text: Juliusz Słowacki, Julian Tuwim)
  - Variations, Op. 4
  - Quartettino, Op. 5
  - Piano Sonata No. 1, Op. 6
  - Songs of Joy and Rhythm, Op. 7
  - Sonatina in One Movement, Op. 8
  - Lullaby, Op. 9
  - From the Bird's Nest, Op. 9a (cycle of miniatures)
- Camargo Guarnieri –
  - Chôro, for clarinet and orchestra
  - Chôro, for piano and orchestra
  - Sonata No. 4 for violin and piano
  - Sonata No. 5 for violin and piano
- Carlos Guastavino –
  - La primera pregunta (El adolescente muerto), for voice and piano (text: N. Cortese)
  - Ombú, for voice and piano (text: N. Mileo, revised in 1989)
  - Mi canto, for voice and piano (text:Mileo),
- Ernesto Halffter – Fantasía galaica (ballet)
- Iain Hamilton – The Bermudas, Op. 33 (text: Hamilton, Jourdain, A. Marvell), for baritone, chorus, and orchestra
- Karl Amadeus Hartmann – Symphony No. 1 Versuch eines Requiems
- Robert Helps – Études (3), for piano
- Hans Werner Henze –
  - Concerto per il Marigny, for piano, clarinet, bass clarinet, horn, trumpet, trombone, viola, and cello
  - Fünf neapolitanische Lieder (texts: anon. 17th-century), for baritone and chamber orchestra
  - Maratona (dance drama in one act), also a suite for two jazz bands and orchestra
  - Sinfonische Etüden, for orchestra
- Alfred Hill –
  - Symphony No. 6 "Gaelic"
  - Symphony No. 7, in E minor
- Paul Hindemith –
  - "Othmar Sch Sch Sch Schoeck", canon for four voices
  - "40, 40, 40, 40, es lebe hoch das Konzerthausleben", canon for three voices
- Alan Hovhaness –
  - God Who Is in the Fire, Op. 146, for tenor solo, men's choir, and percussion (revised in 1965)
  - Greek Folk Dances (7), Op. 150, for harmonica and piano
  - Hercules, Op. 56, no. 4, for soprano and violin
  - Nocturne, Op. 20, no. 2, for flute and harp
  - Piano Sonata, Op. 145
  - Symphony No. 3, Op. 148
- Andrew Imbrie –
  - Introit, Gradual and Alleluia for All Saints' Day, chorus and organ
  - Little Concerto, for piano four-hands and orchestra
- Gordon Jacob –
  - Concerto No. 2 for Oboe and Orchestra
  - Sextet for Piano and Wind Quintet
  - Trio for Violin, Cello, and Piano
  - Variations on "Annie Laurie", for two piccolos, two contrabass clarinets, heckelphone, two contrabassoons, serpent, contrabass serpent, subcontrabass tuba, harmonium, and hurdy-gurdy
- Dmitri Kabalevsky –
  - Romeo and Juliet, suite from the incidental music, Op. 56
  - Symphony No. 4, Op. 54
- Wojciech Kilar –
  - Beskidy Suite for tenor, mixed choir and small orchestra
  - Ode Béla Bartók in memoriam, for violin, brass, and percussion
  - Symphony No. 2 Sinfonia concertante for piano and symphony orchestra
- Gottfried Michael Koenig – Klangfiguren II, electronic music
- Ernst Krenek –
  - Guten Morgen, Amerika, Op. 159, for chorus (text: Carl Sandburg)
  - Spiritus Intelligentiae, Sanctus, Whitsun oratorio for soprano and tenor with electronic music
- Lars-Erik Larsson – Concertino for Violin
- Bruno Maderna – Notturno, electronic music
- Gian-Francesco Malipiero – Dialoghi VII for two pianos and orchestra
- Frank Martin –
  - Études, for string orchestra
  - Ouverture en hommage à Mozart, for orchestra
- Bohuslav Martinů –
  - Impromptu for Two Pianos
  - Legenda z dýmu bramborové [Legend of the Smoke from Potato Tops] (text: Bureš), solo voices, chorus, flute, clarinet, horn, accordion, and piano
  - Piano Concerto no. 4, Incantation
  - Sonatina for Clarinet and Piano
  - Sonatina for Trumpet and Piano
- Yoritsune Matsudaira – Figure sonores for orchestra
- Toshiro Mayuzumi and Makoto Moroi – Seven Variations, electronic music
- Peter Mennin –
  - Concerto for Cello and Orchestra
  - Sonata Concertante for Violin and Piano
- Gian Carlo Menotti – The Unicorn, the Gorgon, and the Manticore, or The Three Sundays of a Poet (madrigal ballet/fable)
- Olivier Messiaen – Oiseaux exotiques, for piano, eleven winds, and seven percussionists
- Robert Moevs – The Past Revisited, three pieces for unaccompanied violin
- Frederic Mompou and Xavier Montsalvatge – Perimplinada (ballet, after Federico García Lorca),
- Bo Nilsson – Zwei Stücke, for flute, bass clarinet, piano, and percussion
- Luigi Nono – Il canto sospeso (text: letters of Resistance fighters), for soprano, contralto, tenor, chorus, and orchestra
- Harry Partch – The Bewitched (dance satire in one act), soprano, chorus, dancers, large instrumental ensemble
- Juan Carlos Paz – Música para fagot, cuerdas y batería
- Vincent Persichetti
  - Little Recorder Book, Op. 70, 1956
  - Serenade no. 9, Op. 71, for two recorders
  - Symphony No. 6, Op. 69, for Band
- Allan Pettersson – Concerto No. 2 for Strings
- Daniel Pinkham –
  - Concerto for Violin and Orchestra
  - Wedding Cantata, for optional solo voices, chorus, and instrumental ensemble
- Walter Piston –
  - Quintet for Winds
  - Serenata for Orchestra
- Quincy Porter –
  - Nocturne, for piano
  - Songs (2), (text: A. Porter)
- Francis Poulenc – Dernier poème
- Franz Reizenstein –
  - Concerto populare
  - Fantasia concertante, op.33, for violin and piano
- George Rochberg –
  - Dialogues, for clarinet and piano
  - Sonata-Fantasia, for piano
- Ned Rorem – Symphony No. 2
- Miklós Rózsa – Concerto for Violin
- Edmund Rubbra –
  - Piano Concerto in G, Op. 85
  - Improvisation for Violin and Orchestra, Op. 89
- Giacinto Scelsi – Quattro Pezzi Su Una Nota Sola, for chamber orchestra of twenty-six musicians
- R. Murray Schafer – Minnelieder (Minnesinger texts), for mezzo-soprano and wind quintet
- Hermann Schroeder – Concerto No. 1 for Violin and Orchestra
- William Schuman –
  - Chester Overture, for concert band
  - The Lord Has a Child, for SATB choir, or female choir, or solo voice, with piano (text: Langston Hughes)
  - New England Triptych, for orchestra
  - Rounds on Famous Words (4), for SATB choir (a fifth round was added in 1969)
- John Serry Sr. – Garden In Monaco – for accordion quartet
- Roger Sessions – Piano Concerto
- Dmitri Shostakovich –
  - Ispanskiye pesni [Spanish Songs], op. 100 (texts: anon., translated by Bolotin, Sikorskaya), mezzo-soprano and piano
  - String Quartet No. 6 in G major Op. 101
- Kaikhosru Shapurji Sorabji –
  - Passeggiata veneziana sopra la Barcarola di Offenbach, for piano
  - Rosario d'arabeschi, for piano
- Karlheinz Stockhausen –
  - Gesang der Jünglinge, electronic and concrete music
  - Klavierstück XI
  - Zeitmaße, for five woodwinds
- Igor Stravinsky – Choral-Variationen über das Weihnachtslied "Vom Himmel hoch da komm' ich her", arr. from Johann Sebastian Bach, for chorus and orchestra
- Sándor Szokolay – Violin Concerto, Op. 13
- Virgil Thomson – Homage to Marya Freund and to the Harp, musical portrait for piano
- Michael Tippett –
  - Bonny at Morn (arr. of Northumbrian folksong), unison choir and three recorders
  - Songs from the British Isles (4), SATB choir
- Vladimir Ussachevsky – Piece for tape recorder
- Ralph Vaughan Williams –
  - A Choral Flourish (text from the Psalms), for SATB choir, two trumpets, and organ
  - God Bless the Master of This House, for SATB choir
  - Preludes on Welsh Folksongs (2), for organ
  - Symphony No. 8
  - A Vision of Aeroplanes (text: N. Ezekiel), motet for SATB choir and organ
- Heitor Villa-Lobos – Emperor Jones (ballet, after Eugene O'Neill),
- William Walton – Cello Concerto
- Mieczysław Weinberg – Piano Sonata No. 5 in A minor, Op. 58
- Egon Wellesz –
  - Suite for solo clarinet, Op. 74
  - Suite for solo oboe, Op. 76
  - Symphony No. 5, Op. 75
- Charles Wuorinen – Music for Orchestra
- Iannis Xenakis – Pithoprakta, for orchestra

== Opera ==
- Malcolm Arnold – The Open Window, Op. 56 (opera in one act, libretto by S. Gilliat, after Saki), premiered on December 14, 1956, on BBC TV
- Leonard Bernstein – Candide (comic operetta in two acts, libretto by Lillian Hellman, R. Wilbur, J. La Touche, D. Parker, and Bernstein, after Voltaire)
- William Bergsma – The Wife of Martin Guerre (opera in three acts, libretto by J. Lewis)
- Wolfgang Fortner – Bluthochzeit (opera in two acts, after Federico García Lorca)
- Arnold Franchetti – The Game of Cards (opera in one act, libretto by the composer)
- Kenneth Gaburo – Blur (opera in one act, libretto by the composer)
- Hans Werner Henze – König Hirsch (opera in three acts, libretto by H. von Cramer, after Carlo Gozzi)
- Ben Johnston – Gertrude, or Would She Be Pleased to Receive It? (chamber opera in two acts, libretto by W. Leach)
- Leonard Kastle – The Swing (thirteen-minute television opera, broadcast at noon on Sunday, June 10, 1956, on NBC television)
- Frank Martin – Der Sturm (opera in three acts, libretto after William Shakespeare, in a German translation by A.W. von Schlege)
- Douglas Moore – The Ballad of Baby Doe
- Gino Negri – Vieni qui, Carla (opera in one act, after Alberto Moravia's Gli indifferenti)
- Elie Siegmeister – Miranda and the Dark Young Man (opera in one act, libretto by Edward Eager)
- Robert Ward – He Who Gets Slapped (libretto by Bernard Stambler), staged under the title Pantaloon

== Film ==
- Georges Auric - The Hunchback of Notre Dame
- Bebe & Louis Barron - Forbidden Planet
- Elmer Bernstein - The Ten Commandments
- Bernard Herrmann - The Man Who Knew Too Much (incorporating "Storm Clouds Cantata" by Arthur Benjamin)
- Paul Misraki - And God Created Woman
- Alfred Newman - Anastasia
- Max Steiner - The Searchers
- Dimitri Tiomkin - Friendly Persuasion
- Dimitri Tiomkin - Giant
- Victor Young - Around the World in 80 Days

== Musical theatre ==
- At the Drop of a Hat, London revue Starring Michael Flanders and Donald Swann, opened at the London fringe venue New Lindsey Theatre on December 31 and transferred to the Fortune Theatre, West End, on January 24, 1957, for a total run of 808 performances
- Bells Are Ringing, Broadway production opened at the Shubert Theatre on November 29 and ran for 924 performances
- Candide (Leonard Bernstein) – Broadway production opened at the Martin Beck Theatre on December 1 and ran for 73 performances
- Fanny, London production opened at the Drury Lane Theatre on November 15 and ran for 347 performances
- Grab Me a Gondola London production opened at the Lyric Theatre, Hammersmith on November 27 and ran for 673 performances
- Happy Hunting Broadway production opened at the Majestic Theatre on December 6 and ran for 412 performances
- Irma La Douce, Paris production opened at the Théâtre Gramont on November 12
- Li'l Abner (Gene de Paul and Johnny Mercer) – Broadway production opened at the St. James Theatre on November 15 and ran for 693 performances
- The Most Happy Fella, Broadway production opened at the Imperial Theatre on May 3 and ran for 676 performances
- Mr. Wonderful, Broadway production opened at the Broadway Theatre on March 22 and ran for 383 performances
- My Fair Lady (Alan Jay Lerner and Frederick Loewe) – Broadway production opened at the Mark Hellinger Theatre on March 15 and ran for 2717 performances
- Plain and Fancy, London production opened at the Drury Lane Theatre on January 25 and ran for 217 performances

== Musical films ==
- Anything Goes starring Bing Crosby and Donald O'Connor
- Carousel starring Gordon MacRae and Shirley Jones
- The Court Jester starring Danny Kaye, Glynis Johns, Basil Rathbone and Angela Lansbury
- The Girl Can't Help It starring Jayne Mansfield and Tom Ewell, and featuring Julie London, Ray Anthony, Fats Domino and The Platters.
- High Society starring Bing Crosby, Grace Kelly, Frank Sinatra, Louis Armstrong and Celeste Holm
- It's a Wonderful World starring George Cole and featuring Ted Heath and Dennis Lotis
- It's Great to Be Young starring John Mills and Cecil Parker
- The King and I starring Yul Brynner and Deborah Kerr
- Pardners starring Dean Martin, Jerry Lewis and Lori Nelson
- A Touch of the Sun starring Frankie Howerd, Ruby Murray and Dennis Price
- The Vagabond King starring Kathryn Grayson

== Births ==
- January 1 –
  - Andy Gill, English post-punk guitarist and record producer (died 2020)
  - Martin Plaza, Australian singer-songwriter and guitarist
- January 3 – Julie Miller, singer
- January 4 –
  - Alex Cline, American drummer and educator
  - Nels Cline, American guitarist and songwriter (Wilco)
- January 9 – Waltraud Meier, operatic soprano
- January 10 – Shawn Colvin, American singer and songwriter
- January 14 – Ben Heppner, Canadian tenor
- January 17 – Paul Young, English pop-rock singer and guitarist (Streetband)
- January 18 –
  - Tom Bailey (Thompson Twins)
  - Christoph Prégardien, operatic tenor
- January 22 – Steve Riley, American drummer
- January 24 – Lounès Matoub, Algerian Berber Kabyle singer
- January 25 – Andy Cox (the Beat, Fine Young Cannibals)
- January 29 –
  - Irlene Mandrell, American actress and singer
  - Amii Stewart, American singer
- January 30 – Henry Doktorski, accordionist
- January 31 – Johnny Rotten, singer (Sex Pistols)
- February 1 – Exene Cervenka, American singer-songwriter and guitarist (X, the Knitters and Auntie Christ)
- February 3 – Lee Ranaldo (Sonic Youth)
- February 8 – Dave Meros, American bass player (Spock's Beard)
- February 13 – Peter Hook (Joy Division, New Order)
- February 19 – Dave Wakeling, British singer/songwriter, guitarist, vocalist (The Beat, General Public)
- February 26 – Keisuke Kuwata, Japanese musician (Southern All Stars)
- March 2 – John Cowsill (the Cowsills)
- March 5 – Teena Marie, singer (died 2010)
- March 7 – Jaime González, Chilean composer
- March 9 – Sergej Larin, operatic tenor (died 2008)
- March 12 – Steve Harris (Iron Maiden)
- March 13 – John Frandsen, Danish composer
- March 16 – Vladimír Godár, composer
- March 17 – Patti Hansen, American actress and model
- April 14 – Barbara Bonney, operatic and concert soprano
- April 28 – Jimmy Barnes, Australian musician
- May 4 – Sharon Jones, African American soul singer (died 2016)
- May 12 – Greg Phillinganes, American keyboardist
- May 18 – Jim Moginie, Australian rock guitarist (Midnight Oil)
- May 19 – Martyn Ware, English musician (The Human League, Heaven 17)
- May 20 – Sheryl Cooper, American dancer, stage performer
- May 25 –
  - Sugar Minott, reggae singer
  - Helen Terry, pop singer and producer
- May 29 – La Toya Jackson, American singer
- June – Chi-chi Nwanoku, English double bass player
- June 3 –
  - Lynne Dawson, soprano
  - Danny Wilde, American singer and guitarist (the Quick and the Rembrandts)
- June 4 – Reeves Gabrels, American guitarist (The Cure, Tin Machine)
- June 5 – Kenny G, saxophonist
- June 23 – Randy Jackson, American bassist and producer
- June 24 – Michael Coleman, American singer-songwriter and guitarist (died 2014)
- June 30 – Philip Adrian Wright, English musician (The Human League)
- June 30 – Ronald Winans, American musician (died 2005)
- July 4 – Jerry Hall, American actress and model
- July 12 – Sandi Patty, American gospel singer
- July 15 –
  - Ian Curtis, vocalist (Joy Division) (died 1980)
  - Marky Ramone, American drummer and songwriter (Ramones, Richard Hell and the Voidoids, and Misfits)
  - Joe Satriani, famous guitar virtuoso, current guitarist for Chickenfoot
- July 20 – Paul Cook (Sex Pistols)
- August 1 – Steve Green, American Christian musician
- August 3 – Graeme Koehne, composer and music teacher
- August 8 –
  - Chris Foreman (Madness)
  - David Grant, English singer and vocal coach
- August 18 –
  - Kelly Willard, American Christian singer
  - Jon "Bermuda" Schwartz, American drummer
- August 26 – Sally Beamish, composer
- August 27 – Glen Matlock, guitarist (Sex Pistols)
- August 29 – GG Allin, American singer-songwriter (died 1993)
- August 31 – Masashi Tashiro, Japanese singer (Rats & Star) and television performer
- September 4 – Blackie Lawless, American singer-songwriter (W.A.S.P.)
- September 10 – Johnnie Fingers, Irish musician (the Boomtown Rats)
- September 12 – Leslie Cheung, Hong Kong singer and actor
- September 20 – Steve Coleman, saxophonist/bandleader (M-Base)
- September 22 – Debby Boone, singer
- October 2 – Freddie Jackson, soul singer
- October 12 – David Vanian, British punk singer (The Damned)
- October 16 – Marin Alsop, orchestral conductor
- October 20 – Ricky Byrd, rock guitarist (Joan Jett and the Blackhearts)
- October 23 – Dwight Yoakam, singer-songwriter
- November 4 – Igor Talkov, Russian singer/songwriter (died 1991)
- November 8 –
  - Alan Frew, lead singer (Glass Tiger)
  - Steven Miller, American record producer
- November 11 – Ian Craig Marsh, English musician and composer (The Human League, Heaven 17)
- November 12 – Stevie Young musician (AC/DC, Starfighters)
- November 17 – Philip Grange, composer
- November 20 – Kool DJ Red Alert, disc jockey
- November 22 – Lawrence Gowan, musician-songwriter (Styx, Rhinegold)
- November 24 – Jouni Kaipainen, composer
- November 25 – Kalle Randalu, Estonian pianist and educator
- December 6 –
  - Peter Buck, American rock guitarist R.E.M.
  - Randy Rhoads, American heavy metal guitarist (Ozzy Osbourne band) (died 1982)
- December 8 –
  - Warren Cuccurullo (Missing Persons, Duran Duran)
  - Pierre Pincemaille, French musician
- December 13 – Majida El Roumi, singer
- December 19
  - Masami Akita, Noise musician, (aka Merzbow)
  - William Orbit, composer
- December 20 – Anita Ward, American singer
- December 23 – Dave Murray (Iron Maiden)
- December 28 – Nigel Kennedy, crossover violinist

== Deaths ==
- January 3 – Alexander Gretchaninov, composer, 91
- January 5 – Mistinguett, entertainer, 80
- January 9 – Paul de Maleingreau, organist and composer, 68
- January 20 – Lucy Isabelle Marsh, soprano and early recording artist, 77
- January 27 – Erich Kleiber, conductor, 65
- February 2 – Charles Grapewin, vaudeville performer, 86
- February 4 – Peder Gram, organist and composer, 74
- February 17 – John N. Klohr, composer of band music, 86
- February 18 – Gustave Charpentier, composer, 95
- February 21 – Edwin Franko Goldman, band composer, 78
- February 26 – Elsie Janis, singer, songwriter and actress, 66
- March 5 – Erich Itor Kahn, composer, 50 (brain haemorrhage)
- March 11 – Sergei Vasilenko, Russian composer, 83
- March 16 – Joseph John Richards, conductor, composer and music teacher, 77
- March 28 – Thomas de Hartmann, composer, 70
- April 9 – Jack Little, composer, actor, singer and songwriter
- April 15 – Kathleen Howard, opera singer, character actress, 71
- May 20 – Harry Stewart, comedian, singer, and songwriter, 47 (car accident)
- June 11 – Frankie Trumbauer, US saxophonist, bandleader and sometime singer, 55 (heart attack)
- June 23 – Reinhold Glière, composer, 81
- June 25 – Michio Miyagi, blind Japanese composer and inventor of musical instruments, 62 (fall from train)
- June 26 (in a car accident):
  - Clifford Brown, jazz trumpeter, 25
  - Richie Powell, jazz pianist, 24
- July 18 – Violet Loraine, musical theatre star, 69
- August 14
  - May Brahe, songwriter, 71
  - Jaroslav Řídký, composer, 58
- August 31 – Yves Nat, pianist and composer, 65
- September 6 – Felix Borowski, composer and music teacher, 84
- September 9 – Rupert Hughes, composer, 84
- September 21 – Rigoberto López Pérez, composer and poet, 35 (shot)
- September 27 – Gerald Finzi, composer, 55 ("severe brain inflammation")
- October 1 – Albert Von Tilzer, songwriter, 78
- October 11 – Harry Parry, jazz musician, 44
- October 12 – Don Lorenzo Perosi, composer, 83
- October 19 – Isham Jones, US bandleader and composer, 62
- October 22 – Valda Valkyrien, ballerina, 61
- October 26 – Walter Gieseking, pianist, 60
- November 1 – Tommy Johnson, blues musician, 60
- November 5 – Art Tatum, jazz pianist, 47 (kidney failure)
- November 10 – Victor Young, violinist, conductor and composer, 56 (brain haemorrhage)
- November 24 – Guido Cantelli, conductor, 36 (plane crash)
- November 26 – Tommy Dorsey, bandleader, 51 (choking)
- November 30
  - Ludvík Kuba, artist and musician, 93
  - Jean Schwartz, songwriter, 78
- December 7 – Henry Fillmore, composer and publisher, 75
- December 19 – Frank Oldfield, baritone, 74

== Awards ==
=== Eurovision Song Contest ===
- Eurovision Song Contest 1956
