= Throw Momma from the Train =

1987 American comedy film

- Theatrical release poster
- Directed by: Danny DeVito
- Written by: Stu Silver
- Produced by: Larry Brezner
- Starring: Danny DeVito; Billy Crystal; Anne Ramsey; Kim Greist
- Cinematography: Barry Sonnenfeld
- Edited by: Michael Jablow
- Music by: David Newman
- Distributed by: Orion Pictures
- Release date: December 11, 1987 (United States)
- Running time: 88 minutes
- Country: United States
- Language: English
- Budget: $14 million
- Box office: $57.9 million

Throw Momma from the Train is a 1987 American crime comedy film starring and directed by Danny DeVito in his theatrical directorial debut. It co-stars Billy Crystal, Anne Ramsey, Rob Reiner, Branford Marsalis, Kim Greist and Kate Mulgrew.

The title comes from Patti Page's 1956 hit song "Mama from the Train (A Kiss, A Kiss)". The film was inspired by the 1950 Patricia Highsmith thriller novel Strangers on a Train, the film adaptation of which is also seen in the film.

The film received mixed reviews, but was a commercial success. Anne Ramsey was praised for her portrayal of the overbearing Mrs. Lift; she won a Saturn Award and was nominated for a Golden Globe Award and the Academy Award for Best Supporting Actress.

== Plot ==
Novelist Larry Donner struggles with writer's block after his ex-wife Margaret steals his previous manuscript, publishes it as her own, and earns acclaim. Struggling financially, Larry takes a job teaching creative writing at a community college. One of his students is the eccentric Owen Lift, whom Larry finds irritating. At home, the middle-aged Owen cares for his verbally and physically abusive, overbearing mother, Momma. He fantasizes about killing her to free himself but cannot bring himself to do it.

Owen becomes obsessed with receiving Larry's feedback on his story. Larry tells him that the plot lacks a convincing motive and alibi and suggests watching an Alfred Hitchcock film for inspiration. Owen watches Strangers on a Train, in which two strangers agree to commit murders for each other while the other is publicly elsewhere, theoretically providing a perfect alibi. Having overheard Larry's earlier outburst about wishing Margaret dead, Owen decides to kill her, believing Larry will then kill Momma in return.

Owen follows Margaret to Hawaii and onto a cruise ship, in order to push her overboard. The next day, he calls Larry and says Margaret is dead and that Larry must now kill Momma. Larry panics when a news report confirms Margaret's apparent death and suggests foul play, realizing he has no alibi and will be an obvious suspect. He confides in his girlfriend Beth, who initially recoils in disgust at his potential involvement, but later leaves an apologetic message on his answering machine mentioning his ramblings about murder, which the police discover.

Larry hides at Owen's house. Though still frustrated by him, Larry begins to bond with Owen after seeing his coin collection, each coin representing a memory of his deceased father. Larry eventually agrees to kill Momma, but after Owen leaves to establish an alibi, Larry changes his mind and instead searches for evidence against him. Police questioning Larry's students arrive at Owen's house and nearly discover Larry before Momma inadvertently prevents them.

After Momma recognizes Larry on a news report about Margaret's death, she calls the police. Larry decides to flee by train to Mexico, with Owen accompanying him and bringing Momma along. During the journey, Larry finally loses patience with Momma after she gives him writing advice. He follows her to the caboose intending to kill her, but Owen and Larry have second thoughts. Momma attacks Larry and falls from the train, but Larry and Owen save and pull her back aboard. Grateful to Owen, she nevertheless kicks Larry off the train.

While recovering in hospital, Larry learns that Margaret is alive. She accidentally fell overboard, was rescued by a Polynesian fisherman whom she now intends to marry, and has sold the film rights to her ordeal for $1.5 million. An exasperated roommate tells Larry to stop obsessing over Margaret and focus on himself. After a nightmare in which he strangles Margaret before realizing he is strangling himself, Larry overcomes his writer's block and begins writing a novel based on his experiences with Owen.

A year later, Larry has nearly finished the novel and reconciled with Beth. Owen visits and reveals that Momma has died of natural causes and that he is heading to New York City for the launch of his own book, Momma, and Owen, and Owen's Friend, Larry, also based on their experiences. Believing his idea has been stolen again, an enraged Larry begins strangling Owen until he discovers that the book is a children's pop-up book presenting a sanitized version of events and ending with Larry, Owen, and Momma sharing a picnic.

Months later, Larry's own novel, Throw Momma from the Train, has become a bestseller, and he, Owen, and Beth vacation together in Hawaii.

== Cast ==
- Danny DeVito as Owen Lift
- Billy Crystal as Larry Donner
- Anne Ramsey as Momma
- Kim Greist as Beth Ryan
- Kate Mulgrew as Margaret Donner
- Branford Marsalis as Lester
- Rob Reiner as Joel
- Bruce Kirby as Detective DeBenedetto
- Joey Depinto as Sergeant
- Annie Ross as Mrs. Hazeltine
- Raye Birk as Pinsky
- Olivia Brown as Ms. Gladstone

Farley Granger and Robert Walker appear via archive footage from Strangers on a Train as Guy Haines and Bruno Antony, respectively. Oprah Winfrey also appears as herself in a fictional episode of The Oprah Winfrey Show.

== Production ==
In June 1987, Warner Bros. and Orion Pictures made a trade-off agreement to facilitate the filming of the movie, as well as the development of Arthur 2: On the Rocks, which was supplied for Warner Bros. and the deal was provided by producer Larry Brezner, who produced the movie as well as the original Arthur and in return for permission to use footage and the premise from Strangers on a Train, a 1951 Warner Bros. film, Brezner's production company surrendered the remake and sequel rights of the 1981 film Arthur to Warner Bros., which the original Arthur rights were jointly owned by Jack Rollins, Charles H. Joffe, Buddy Morra and Brezner and Warner Bros., and Warners could not have proceeded with the Arthur sequel without the consent of Brezner's company.

== Reception ==
On Rotten Tomatoes, the film has an approval score of 65% based on 37 reviews. The site's critical consensus reads, "Danny DeVito's direction is too broad to offer the kind of nastiness that would have made Throw Momma from the Train truly special, but DeVito's on-screen chemistry with co-star Billy Crystal makes this a smoothly entertaining comedy." On Metacritic, the film has a score of 56 based on 14 reviews, indicating "mixed or average reviews". Audiences polled by Cinemascore gave the film a "C+" grade on a scale from A+ to F.

Roger Ebert gave the film 2 stars out of 4, stating that "The plot in Throw Momma from the Train is top-heavy, but the movie doesn't make as much as it could from its weird characters."

== Awards and nominations ==
| Award | Category | Subject | Result |
|---|---|---|---|
| Academy Award | Best Supporting Actress | Anne Ramsey | Nominated |
| Saturn Award | Best Supporting Actress | Anne Ramsey | Won |
| Golden Globe Award | Best Supporting Actress – Motion Picture | Anne Ramsey | Nominated |
| Golden Globe Award | Best Actor – Motion Picture Musical or Comedy | Danny DeVito | Nominated |

== Lawsuit ==
Irving Gordon, writer of the song "Mama from the Train", sued Orion Pictures and was awarded $100,000. It is uncertain whether a change in the spelling of "Mama" to "momma" was related.

== Planned sequel ==
In a November 2023 GQ interview, DeVito mentioned working on a potential sequel. "Billy [Crystal] and I want to work together again. We were looking at possibly doing Throw Poppa from the Train," he told the outlet. Entertainment Weekly confirmed that a follow-up was being developed between the two stars.
