= Page Two =

Page Two or Page 2 may refer to:

- Page Two, album by Page Cavanaugh 1993
- Page Two, album by Peter Beets and New York Trio 2003
- Page Two – Sings a Collection of Her Most Famous Songs, LP by Patti Page
- Page Two (EP), a 2016 extended play by South Korean girl group Twice
- Page Two : Ten years of "News and views", by rabbi W. Gunther Plaut Holy Blossom Temple 1971
