= Page 4 – A Collection of Her Most Famous Songs =

Compilation album by Patti Page
- Released: February 1956
- Genre: Traditional pop
- Label: Mercury

Patti Page compilation album chronology
Page 3 – A Collection of Her Most Famous Songs (1955)	Page 4 – A Collection of Her Most Famous Songs (1956)	This Is My Song (1956)

Page 4 – A Collection of Her Most Famous Songs is a compilation album by Patti Page. It was released in February 1956 on Mercury Records and distributed as a vinyl LP.

This was the final album in a series of four, titled "Page 1" to "Page 4".

Billboard welcomed the album saying: 'The fourth LP in Patti Page’s “Page” series should be another steady seller for the thrush and, as always, a big favorite with deejays. The photogenic lark gives the cover considerable display value, while her creamy vocal talents are heard to fine advantage on such nostalgic standards as “Happiness Is a Thing Called Joe,” “There Will Never Be Another You” and her old hit single “I Went to Your Wedding.”'

== Track listing ==
Track listing for Page Four – A Collection of Her Most Famous Songs
Track number	Title	Songwriter(s)	Length
A1	I Went to Your Wedding	Jessie Mae Robinson	3:16
A2	My Restless Lover	Pem Davenport	3:04
A3	You Too Can Be a Dreamer	Jerry Livingston / Mitchell Parish	2:47
A4	Near to You	Richard Adler / Jerry Ross	3:02
A5	Let Me Go, Lover!	Jenny Lou Carson / Al Hill	2:26
A6	You Belong to Me	Pee Wee King / Redd Stewart / Chilton Price	2:50
B1	Mister and Mississippi	Irving Gordon	3:12
B2	Lonely Days	Thomas F. Moore / Danny Hurd	2:32
B3	There Will Never Be Another You	Harry Warren / Mack Gordon	3:12
B4	I Walked Alone Last Night	Jack Wolf / Robert Arthur	2:07
B5	You're the Answer to My Prayer	Maxine Manners	2:20
B6	Happiness Is a Thing Called Joe	Harold Arlen / E. Y. "Yip" Harburg	3:16
