= Jaime González =

Jaime González may refer to:

- Jaime González (Chilean footballer) (born 1977), Chilean footballer
- Jaime González (Colombian footballer) (1938–1985), Colombian footballer
- Jaime González (composer) (born 1956), Chilean composer
- Jaime Gonzalez (golfer) (born 1954), Brazilian golfer
- Jaime González (sport shooter) (1933–2011), Spanish shooter
- Jaime González Durán (born 1971), Mexican drug trafficker

== See also ==
- Jaime González Airport in Cuba
