= A House with Love in It =

Song performed by The Four Lads

"A House with Love in It" is a popular song composed by Sidney Lippman with lyrics by Sylvia Dee. The song was published in 1956.

The recording by The Four Lads (made July 17, 1956) was released by Columbia Records as catalog number 40736. It first reached the Billboard charts on September 15, 1956. On the Disk Jockey chart, it peaked at #20; on the Best Seller chart, at #16; and on the composite chart of the top 100 songs, it reached #23. The flip side was "The Bus Stop Song (A Paper of Pins)."

== Other Recordings ==
The song has also been recorded by:

- Also in 1956, Vera Lynn recorded her version.
- Gordon MacRae
- Nat King Cole
