= Mama from the Train =

1956 song by Irving Gordon

Single by Patti Page
- B-side: "Every Time (I Feel His Spirit)"
- Published: 1956
- Released: September 17, 1956
- Genre: Traditional pop
- Length: 2:49
- Label: Mercury
- Songwriter: Irving Gordon

"Mama from the Train", also known as "Mama from the Train (A Kiss, a Kiss)", is a popular song written by Irving Gordon and published in 1956. The song is about memories of a now-deceased mother, whose Pennsylvania Dutch-influenced English leads to quaint phrasings.

== Recordings ==
The best-known version was recorded by Patti Page. This recording was released by Mercury Records as catalog number 70971. It first reached the Billboard magazine charts on November 3, 1956. On the Disk Jockey chart, it peaked at #12; on the Best Seller chart, at #17; on the Juke Box chart, at #12; on the composite chart of the top 100 songs, it reached #11. In Australia the song afforded Page a #31 hit.

== Song's influence ==
The title, as printed on the sheet music — Mama From the Train (A Kiss, A Kiss) — and the first line of the refrain — "Throw Mama from the train a kiss, a kiss" — inspired two parodies:

- Homer and Jethro, a country music comedy team, recorded a parody of this song that included the lines "Throw mama from the train, but quick, but quick."
- In New York City during the 1950s, Jewish street vendors who sold knishes near subway train stations lettered signs that punned, "Throw Mama from the train a knish, a knish ... don't leave her hungry behind".
- In 1987, Danny DeVito and Billy Crystal starred in the dark comedy film Throw Momma from the Train, which was also based in part on the 1951 Alfred Hitchcock film Strangers on a Train.
