= Mangos (song) =

Single by Rosemary Clooney
- B-side: "Independent (on My Own)"
- Released: 1956
- Genre: Novelty
- Label: Columbia
- Songwriter(s): Dee Libbey (music); Sid Wayne (lyrics)

"Mangos" is a 1956 popular song written by composer Dee Libbey and lyricist Sid Wayne.

It was first introduced in the musical revue Ziegfeld Follies 1957.

It was recorded by Rosemary Clooney, and is a follow-on to her earlier hit "Come On-a My House" in style and subject matter. The Rosemary Clooney version of the song (released by Columbia Records as catalog number 40835) reached #10 on the Billboard magazine disk jockey charts, and #25 on the overall Billboard Top 100. It also reached #17 on the United Kingdom charts.

== Cover versions ==
- Marion Ryan covered it in the United Kingdom
- Whilst Petula Clark recorded it in French as "Papayer".
- In 2007 Ringo Shiina covered it as "Papaya Mango" (パパイヤマンゴー) on her album Heisei Fūzoku.
