= Quillota =

City in Valparaíso Region, Chile

- City and Commune
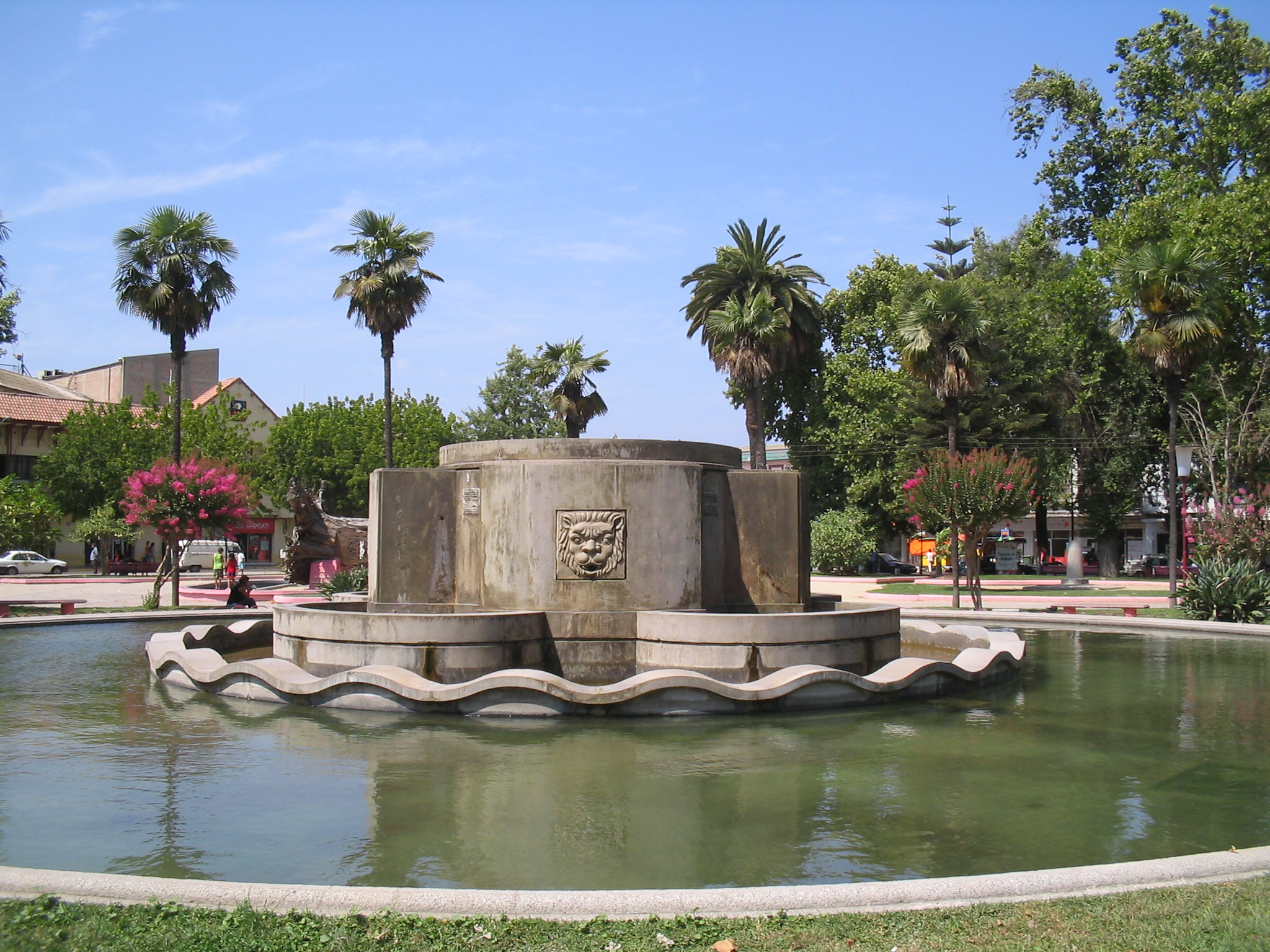

- Coat of arms Location in Chile
- Motto: City created with care (Ciudad creada con cariño)
- Coordinates: 32°52′S 71°15′W
- Country: Chile
- Region: Valparaíso
- Province: Quillota
- Founded: November 11, 1717

Government
  - Type: Municipality
  - Mayor: Óscar Calderón Sánchez (Independent)

Area
  - Total: 302 km^{2} (117 sq mi)
- As of 2002
- Elevation: 462 m (1,516 ft)

Population (2012 Census)
  - Total: 85,262
  - Density: 282/km^{2} (731/sq mi)
  - Urban: 66,025
  - Rural: 9,891
- Demonym: Quillotan

Sex
  - Men: 37,191
  - Women: 38,725
- Time zone: UTC-4 (CLT)
  - Summer (DST): UTC-3 (CLST)
- Postal code: 2260000
- Area code: 56 + 33
- Climate: Csb
- Website: Official website (in Spanish)

Quillota is a city located in the valley of the Aconcagua River in Valparaíso Region, Chile. It is the capital and largest city of Quillota Province. It is surrounded by the localities of San Isidro, La Palma, Pocochay, and San Pedro. It is an important agricultural center, mainly because of the plantations of avocado and cherimoya trees.

Quillota is connected to the city of La Calera by the small city of La Cruz. Charles Darwin described the area's agriculture and the landscape in his book The Voyage of the Beagle. In nearby La Campana National Park, there is a plaque at a viewpoint commemorating Darwin's visit.

== History ==
The Quillota Valley had been populated for about 2,000 years. At the outset, the area was inhabited by Native Americans of the Bato and Lleo-Lleo cultures, who had migrated to the valley because of the fertile land south of the Aconcagua River. These natives were later influenced by Mapuches and Diaguitas. The Diaguitas are credited with the evolution of the local culture of the Aconcagua zone and were well known for their pottery.

Later, Quillota was mitma and the capital of Qullasuyu, the southern Inca Empire.

Diego de Almagro arrived in the valley in 1536. Incan scouts led him to a beautiful and fertile valley where the "Quillotas" lived. Before Almagro's arrival, a Spanish soldier from Peru called Gonzalo Calvo de Barrientos had been captured by the Quillotas and lived in the valley, learning the local language and culture during his captivity.

Although Almagro was delighted by the discovery of the valley, the purpose of his journey had been to find gold. Unsuccessful in his objective, he returned to Peru, where he was later executed.

In 1540, Pedro de Valdivia arrived in the Quillota Valley with the title of Governor of Chile. He built farms and houses, mainly for the slaves and the Indians who were working for him. Most of the area presently occupied by Quillota had originally been his property. Valdivia established a fortress between San Pedro and Limache, extracted gold from La Campana Mountain, and cultivated the Rautén Valley, La Palma and Boco. He took the entire area as his personal property, leaving the Mapocho Valley as the capital when he founded Santiago.

In 1585, Quillota was declared the capital of the Corregimiento de Quillota, a large province between Illapel and Casablanca.

In the 16th century, attempts were made to found a village in the Quillota Valley with all the features and requirements ordered by the Spanish Crown, but it did not succeed.

It was only on November 11, 1717, St. Martin's Day, that Quillota was founded. Its original name was "Villa de San Martín de la Concha del Valle de Quillota" (transl. Town of San Martin de la Concha of Quillota Valley). The city was founded by the bishop, Luis Romero, and the governor, José de Santiago Concha y Salvatierra.

== Demographics ==
According to data from the 2002 Census of Population and Housing, Quillota had 75,916 inhabitants (making it the 65th largest city in the country); of these, 66,025 (87.0%) lived in urban areas and 9,891 (13.0%) in rural areas. At that time, there were 37,191 men and 38,725 women.

A large part of Quillota's population are descendants of Spanish settlers and mestizos. There are still a few families with lands in the valley given by the Spanish governors.

== City planning ==
Quillota's motto is "Ciudad creada con cariño" meaning "City created with care". Quillota remains one of the most traditional cities in Chile in that its layout still mainly corresponds to the original colonial Spanish layout of seven blocks square. Due to the geological composition of the ground and the frequency of earthquakes, its architecture has remained low-rise (with a four-story maximum) and traditional. Today, the commune spans an area of 302 km^{2} (117 sq mi).

Given its fertile soil, its commune's economy is mainly agricultural, and it is one of the main production centers in the country.

== Administration ==
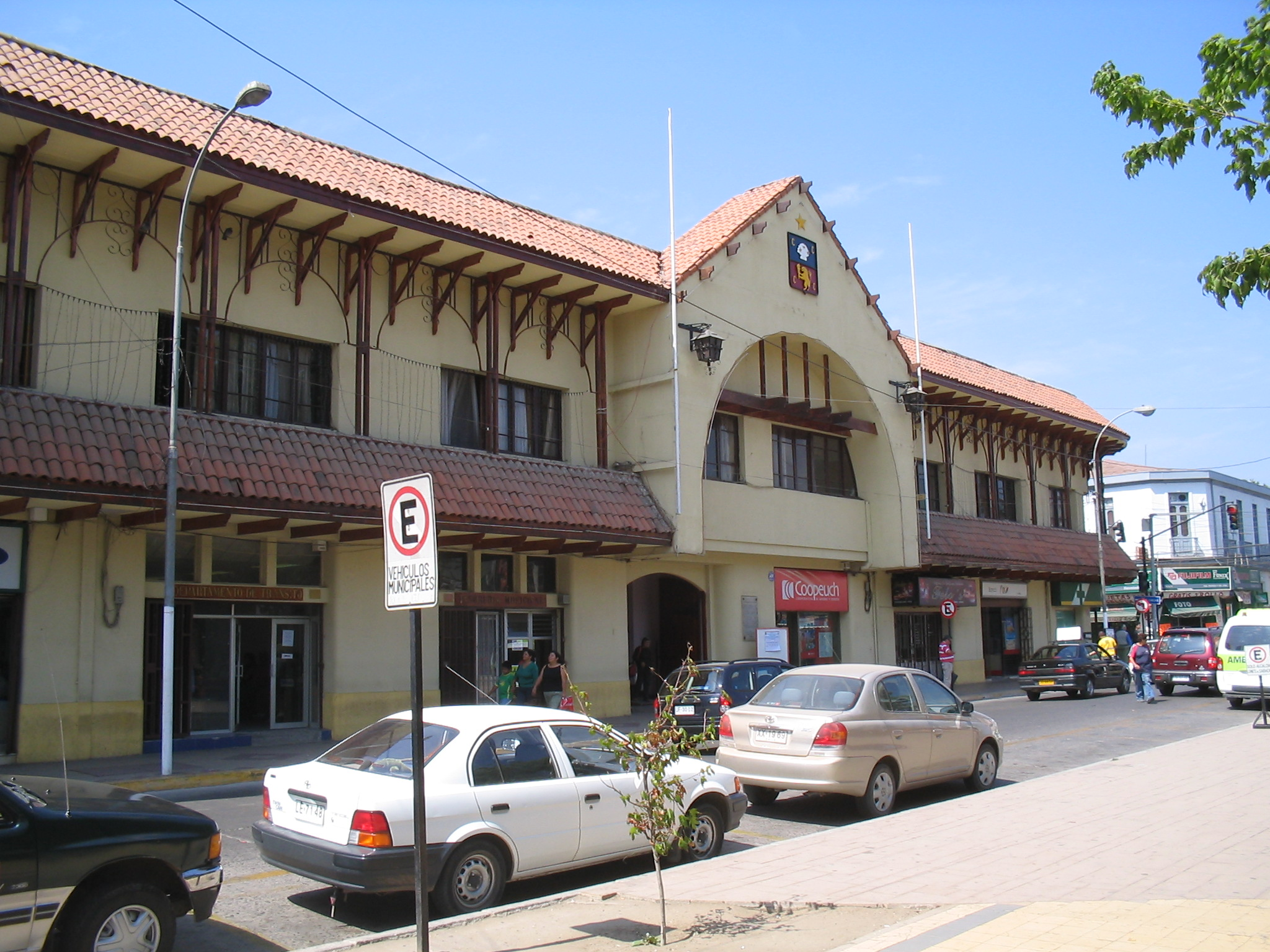
Municipality headquarters of the Quillota commune.

As a commune, Quillota is a third-level administrative division of Chile administered by a municipal council, headed by a mayor who is directly elected every four years. The 2008-2012 mayor is Luis Alberto Mella Gajardo (DC). The municipal council has the following members:

- Mauricio Javier Ávila Pino (DC)
- María Genoveva Baeza Hermosilla (RN)
- Fernando Alberto Puentes Wasaff (DC)
- José Antonio Rebolar Rivas (RN)
- Víctor Manuel Vergara Flores (PR)
- Alejandro Eduardo Villarroel Castillo (UDI)

Within the electoral divisions of Chile, Quillota is represented in the Chamber of Deputies by Eduardo Cerda (PDC) and Andrea Molina (UDI) as part of the 10th electoral district, (together with La Ligua, Petorca, Cabildo, Papudo, Zapallar, Puchuncaví, Quintero, Nogales, Calera, La Cruz and Hijuelas). The commune is represented in the Senate by Ignacio Walker Prieto (PDC) and Lily Pérez San Martín (RN) as part of the 5th senatorial constituency (Valparaíso-Cordillera).

== Schools and universities ==
The city is well endowed with educational facilities, for primary and secondary education. Given its agricultural importance in the country, many universities of the region have established their agricultural studies faculties here. The following is a list of some of these facilities:

- Colegio Valle del Aconcagua
- Colegio Inglés Saint Gabriel
- Colegio Francisco de Miranda
- Colegio Nuestra Señora del Huerto
- Colegio San Ignacio de LaSalle
- Colegio Quillota Terranova
- Colegio Nueva Era Siglo XXI
- Colegio Niño Jesús de Praga
- Colegio Técnico Diego Echeverría Castro, Marist Brothers
- Instituto Rafael Ariztía, Marist Brothers
- Liceo Comercial de Quillota
- Liceo de Hombres Santiago Escutti Orrego
- School of Agricultural Studies of the Universidad Católica de Valparaíso.

== Climate ==
Climate data for Quillota
Month	Jan	Feb	Mar	Apr	May	Jun	Jul	Aug	Sep	Oct	Nov	Dec	Year
Mean daily maximum °C (°F)	26.8 (80.2)	26.6 (79.9)	25.6 (78.1)	22.7 (72.9)	19.3 (66.7)	16.9 (62.4)	16.8 (62.2)	18.2 (64.8)	19.7 (67.5)	21.9 (71.4)	24.7 (76.5)	26.2 (79.2)	22.1 (71.8)
Daily mean °C (°F)	18.4 (65.1)	17.8 (64.0)	16.6 (61.9)	14.2 (57.6)	12.4 (54.3)	10.6 (51.1)	10.4 (50.7)	11.2 (52.2)	12.5 (54.5)	14.1 (57.4)	16.2 (61.2)	17.8 (64.0)	14.4 (57.8)
Mean daily minimum °C (°F)	11.5 (52.7)	11.2 (52.2)	9.8 (49.6)	8.1 (46.6)	7.4 (45.3)	5.8 (42.4)	5.5 (41.9)	5.8 (42.4)	6.9 (44.4)	8.2 (46.8)	9.1 (48.4)	10.7 (51.3)	8.3 (47.0)
Average precipitation mm (inches)	2.1 (0.08)	5.0 (0.20)	2.1 (0.08)	16.3 (0.64)	78.8 (3.10)	117.6 (4.63)	88.4 (3.48)	70.0 (2.76)	22.7 (0.89)	12.8 (0.50)	6.1 (0.24)	2.3 (0.09)	424.2 (16.69)
Average relative humidity (%)	75	77	78	81	84	84	83	83	83	79	75	72	80
Source: Bioclimatografia de Chile

== Notable people ==
- Jaime González (born 1956), composer and music educator
- Elmina Moisan (1897–1938), painter
