= Page 1 – A Collection of Her Most Famous Songs =

Compilation album by Patti Page
- Released: October 1955
- Genre: Traditional pop
- Label: Mercury

Patti Page compilation album chronology
Page 1 – A Collection of Her Most Famous Songs (1955)	Page 2 – A Collection of Her Most Famous Songs (1955)

Page 1 – A Collection of Her Most Famous Songs is a compilation album by Patti Page. It was released in October 1955 on Mercury Records. It was distributed as a vinyl LP.

This was the first album in a series of four, titled "Page 1" to "Page 4". Billboard liked this one saying (inter alia): "Mercury has a good nostalgic album series idea, with Patti Page apparently destined to cut a group of albums dedicated to songs of various decades. "Page 1" spotlights the canary's warm show-wise vocal talents on tunes from the 1930s... Strong sales prospects for this one, and a potent ‘must’ for jocks."

== Track listing ==
Track listing for Page One – Sings a Collection of Her Most Famous Songs
Track number	Title	Songwriter(s)	Length
A1	Don't Blame Me	Jimmy McHugh / Dorothy Fields	3:09
A2	I Don't Stand a Ghost of a Chance with You	Victor Young / Ned Washington / Bing Crosby	3:15
A3	I Only Have Eyes for You	Harry Warren / Al Dubin	3:11
A4	Ev'ry Day (I Fall in Love)	Sammy Fain / Irving Kahal	3:25
A5	Stars Fell on Alabama	Frank Perkins / Mitchell Parish	3:05
A6	I'll String Along with You	Harry Warren / Al Dubin	2:49
B1	Stay As Sweet As You Are	Harry Revel / Mack Gordon	2:48
B2	Red Sails in the Sunset	Hugh Williams / Jimmy Kennedy	3:11
B3	Nobody's Darling but Mine	Jimmie Davis	2:27
B4	East of the Sun	Brooks Bowman	2:59
B5	I Wished on the Moon	Ralph Rainger / Dorothy Parker	2:45
B6	It's Been So Long	Walter Donaldson / Harold Adamson	1:59
