= Delaware (song) =

Single by Perry Como
- Language: English (+ counting in Italian, French and German)
- B-side: "I Know What God Is"
- Released: January 1960
- Recorded: December 28, 1959
- Genre: Traditional pop
- Length: 2:18
- Label: RCA Victor
- Songwriter: Irving Gordon
- Producer: Charles Grean

Perry Como singles chronology
"I Know" (1959)	"Delaware" (1960)	"I Know What God Is" (1960)

"Delaware" is a popular song, written by Irving Gordon. The song was published in 1959 and has references to 15 states of the United States. The states were portrayed, in the form of puns, as: Della wear, new jersey, Calla 'phone ya, how ar' ya, Missus sip, mini-soda, Ora gone, I'll ask 'er, taxes, Wiscon sin, new brass key, Arkan saw, Tenne see, Flora die and misery.

Gordon was apparently inspired to write the song after the success of another song that he wrote punning on the name of States of the United States of America: "Mister and Mississippi."

The hit version of the song was recorded by Perry Como on December 28, 1959. It was released by RCA Victor as a 45 rpm single with catalog number 47-7670 and as a stereophonic single with catalog number 61-7670. The flip side was "I Know What God Is". The record reached #22 on the Billboard charts in March 1960. The 2 sides were co-charted in Canada, reaching number 16.

The same recording, with the same B-side, was released by RCA Victor in the United Kingdom (catalog number 1170) where, oddly, it sold even better than in the U.S., reaching #3 on the UK Singles Chart.

Copyright over the lyrics of "Delaware" is held by Sony/ATV Music Publishing from whom permission must be obtained to reproduce the lyrics.
