= The Bus Stop Song =

"The Bus Stop Song" (also known as "A Paper of Pins") is a popular song. The title references the film, Bus Stop, in which it was introduced.

A traditional song, it was orchestrated by Ken Darby in 1956 but a version (called The Keys of Canterbury) was known in the 19th century and Alan Lomax collected it as "A Paper of Pins" in the 1930s.

It is best known in a recording, made on July 17, 1956, by The Four Lads and dubbed over the opening credits of the movie, with some of its lyrics also included in early dialogue. This recording was released by Columbia Records as catalog number 40736. It first reached the Billboard charts on September 15, 1956. On the Disk Jockey chart, it peaked at number 17; on the Best Seller chart, at number 22; on the composite chart of the top 100 songs, it reached number 23. The flip side was "A House with Love in It."
