= Jean Paul Morel =

Jean Paul Morel (January 10, 1903 in Abbeville – April 14, 1975 in New York City) was a French-born naturalized-American conductor. He served on the conducting staff of the New York City Opera from 1946-1951. He had a long association with the Metropolitan Opera as their chief conductor of the French repertoire from 1956-1971. He also taught for 22 years at Juilliard School, where he was the director of the Juilliard Orchestra and professor of conducting. Several of his pupils became famous conductors, including Herbert Blomstedt, James Levine and Leonard Slatkin.
