= Canto a Baja California =

Official anthem of Baja California and Baja California Sur, Mexico

English: Song to Baja California
- State anthem of Baja California
- Lyrics: Rafael Trujillo, 1956
- Music: Rafael Gama, 1956
- Adopted: September 27, 1956; June 25, 2012 (Baja California Sur)

"Canto a Baja California" (Spanish: Song to Baja California) is the official anthem of the Mexican State of Baja California. During the term of Braulio Maldonado Sández as governor, with the aim of increasing the cultural heritage of Bajacalifornianos, the writers and musicians residing in the State and the State natives who were living in other States and abroad convened on February 24, 1956, to compose the Anthem of Baja California, as well as the lyrics.

The winners of this contest were the lyrics of Rafael Trujillo, (nicknamed "Caballero Aguila") and the music of Rafael Gama, (nicknamed "Escala"). Both residents of Los Angeles, California, United States. Governor Braulio Maldonado Sández published and officially adopted the song as anthem on September 27, 1956, the Canto a Baja California (Song to Baja California).

In the state of Baja California, despite it being official, it contradicts a law which says that the state's symbols are the national symbols, with the state also having its own coat of arms.

== Lyrics ==
[See talk page.]

"Canto a Baja California":

Chorus:

Baja California, brazo poderoso,
al servicio eterno de la Patria estás;
libre y soberano, bravo y laborioso,
soldado en la guerra y obrero en la paz.

Chorus:

Baja California, strong arm
to the eternal service of the Fatherland, you are;
free and sovereign, brave and laborious,
soldier in war and worker in peace.

Estrofa I:

De zafiros y perlas vestida,
bajo el sol que en tu frente fulgura,
eres diosa de rara hermosura,
eres Venus que surge del mar;
eres casta doncella que cuida
en el Templo la llama sagrada
la vestal con amor consagrada
a velar por la patria inmortal.

Stanza I:

Sapphires and pearls dressed,
under the sun that shines on your face,
you are a goddess of rare beauty,
you are Venus that rises from the sea;
you are a chaste maiden who cares
in the Temple the sacred flame
the vestal with love consecrated
to ensure the immortal Fatherland.

Estrofa II:

A los cielos gloriosos erguida
eres roble y encina y palmera,
en la guerra, invencible trinchera,
un ubérrimo surco en la paz;
a la enorme con fuerza tendida,
lanza en riste y escudo y acero
que opondrán su pujanza al que artero
a la Patria pretenda ultrajar.

Stanza II:

To the heaven glorious erect
are holm and oak and palm,
in the war, trench invincible,
an extensive groove in peace;
to the huge stretched tightly,
lance ahead and shield and steel
to oppose its strength to that crafty
to the Fatherland intend to offend.

Estrofa III:

Eres firme atalaya y vigía,
centinela impasible que vela
custodiando el hogar y la escuela
en viril posición vertical.
Tus enhiestas montañas altivas
son columnas que tocan al cielo
donde el Aguila Azteca en su vuelo
de oro y mármol tendrá pedestal.

Stanza III:

Are strong tower and watchtower
impassively sentinel who watches
guarding the home and school
in manly upright.
Your erect haughty mountains
are columns that touch the sky
where the Aztec Eagle in flight
will gold and marble pedestal.

Estrofa IV:

Su tesoro te ofrendan las minas,
su opulenta riqueza los mares,
tu campiña, algodón, olivares
y maizal y viñedo y trigal.
Mas no tienes riqueza que mida
la del pueblo que lucha en tu nombre:
tu riqueza mayor es el hombre,
una cuna, una escuela, un hogar.

Stanza IV:

Its treasure the mines offers to you
its opulent wealth the seas,
your countryside, cotton, olive
and cornfields and vineyards and wheat field.
But you do not have wealth that measure
of the people fighting in your name:
your greatest wealth is the man
a cradle, a school, a home.

Estrofa V:

El trabajo fecundo es doctrina
que sustenta tu vida afanosa,
y por eso sabrás valerosa
defender la Justicia Social.
¡Salve, oh, tierra, que firme y erguida
quieres verte, taller y trinchera,
convertida en el asta-bandera
del glorioso Pendón Nacional!

Stanza V:

The fruitful work is doctrine
that sustains your breathless life,
and therefore you'll know courageous
defend the Social Justice.
¡Hail, oh, land, sign and erect
want to see yourself, shop and trench,
converted into the flagstick
of the Glorious National Banner!

== See also ==
- Baja California
- Baja California peninsula
