= Page 2 – A Collection of Her Most Famous Songs =

Compilation album by Patti Page
- Released: October 1955
- Genre: Traditional pop
- Label: Mercury

Patti Page compilation album chronology
Page 1 – A Collection of Her Most Famous Songs (1955)	Page 2 – A Collection of Her Most Famous Songs (1955)	Page 3 – A Collection of Her Most Famous Songs (1955)

Page 2 – A Collection of Her Most Famous Songs is a compilation album by Patti Page. It was released in October 1955 on Mercury Records. It was distributed as a vinyl LP.

This was the second album in a series of four, titled "Page 1" to "Page 4".

== Reception ==
Billboard welcomed the album saying: “Page 2,” second in Mercury’s new Patti Page LP series, features memorable tunes from the late 1920s and early 1930s—“It All Depends on You,” “My Ideal,” “Rockin’ Chair,” etc—sung with warmth, taste and sincerity by the thrush.

== Track listing ==
Track listing for Page Two – Sings a Collection of Her Most Famous Songs
Track number	Title	Songwriter(s)	Length
A1	It All Depends on You	Buddy DeSylva / Lew Brown / Ray Henderson	2:04
A2	When You're Smiling	Larry Shay / Joe Goodwin / Mark Fisher	1:45
A3	You're Driving Me Crazy	Walter Donaldson	2:56
A4	My Ideal	Richard A. Whiting / Leo Robin / Newell Chase	2:31
A5	I Still Get a Thrill (Thinking of You)	Benny Davis / J. Fred Coots	2:51
A6	Rockin’ Chair	Hoagy Carmichael	2:52
B1	Just One More Chance	Arthur Johnston / Sam Coslow	3:02
B2	When Your Lover Has Gone	Einar Swan	2:46
B3	Penthouse Serenade	Will Jason / Val Burton	3:08
B4	Paradise	Nacio Herb Brown / Gordon Clifford	2:33
B5	Sweet and Lovely	Gus Arnheim / Harry Tobias / Jules Lemare	2:56
B6	I'll Never Be the Same	Matty Malneck / Frank Signorelli / Gus Kahn	3:00
