= Variations for Orchestra (Cowell) =

1956 musical composition by Henry Cowell

Henry Cowell wrote his Variations for Orchestra, HC 833, in 1956.

== History ==
Henry Cowell was commissioned for an orchestral composition by Thor Johnson and the Cincinnati Symphony Orchestra. It was completed in August 1956 and subsequently revised for conductor Leopold Stokowski, before he conducted it in Houston in 1959. It was written during Cowell's final musical period in Woodstock, New York, having accepted too many commissions at the time because of his constant anxiety about not receiving an adequate income.

== Composition ==
The piece, structured in five movements, uses a serialist tone row as its theme, one of the few Cowell compositions to do so. Cowell said of the theme that, though it makes use of all twelve notes in the chromatic scale, it is not developed according to the typical row technique; that it is "diatonic without following any particular mode". The harmonic language ranges freely from simple triads to large tone clusters and polychords — an evolution of the tone clusters he utilized earlier in his career.

Cowell writes as a performance note in the original manuscript:

The Variations are upon a theme, first announced in unison, which makes use of all 12 tones, but is not developed according to row technique. Neither is it in convention [sic] variations form; rather ideas from the theme are freely used and contrasted in mood, tempo and instrumentation. During the variations, each sort of instrument in the orchestra has a solo part, and each section plays as a unit alone.

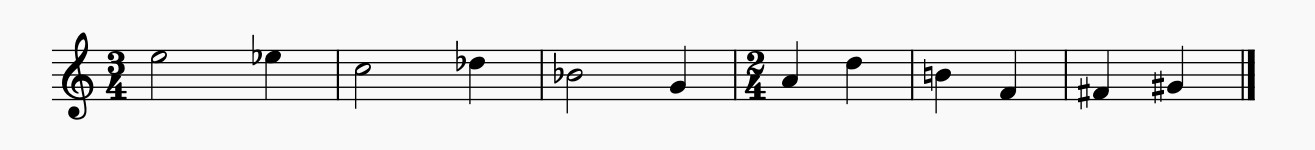
Twelve-tone theme in the exposition, played by orchestral tutti
