= Song for a Summer Night =

Single by Mitch Miller and His Orchestra and Chorus
- B-side: "Song for a Summer Night"
- Released: July 9, 1956
- Genre: Traditional pop
- Length: 3:10
- Label: Columbia
- Songwriter(s): Robert Allen

Mitch Miller and His Orchestra and Chorus singles chronology
"Trapeze" (1956)	"Song for a Summer Night" (1956)	"Jubilation T. Cornpone" (1956)

"Song for a Summer Night" is a song written by Robert Allen and performed by Mitch Miller and His Orchestra and Chorus. It reached #8 on the U.S. pop chart in 1956.

The B-side of the single is the vocal version of the song.

The song was introduced on Westinghouse Studio One Summer Theatre.

== Other versions ==
- Johnny Brandon released a version of the song as the B-side to his 1956 single "Glendora".
- Jack Nitzsche released a version of the song as a single in 1963, but it did not chart. It was produced by Jimmy Bowen.
