= Dee Libbey =

American composer (1919–1988)

Anastasia Delores Rohde Libbey (1 November 1919 – 4 July 1988) was an American composer who studied with Nadia Boulanger and wrote classical music as well as popular hit songs like "Mango". She published her music under the name Dee Libbey and the pseudonym Q'Adrianne Rohde.

== Life and career ==
Libbey was born in Deland, Florida, to Anastasia Delores Shumate and Clifford Kahrwald Rohde. She won awards for playing xylophone in high school, then studied music at Stetson University; the American Conservatory in Fontainebleau, France, and Chicago; and privately with several teachers. She sang tenor in at least one church choir. Her teachers included Nadia Boulanger, Dr. William Duckwitz, the xylophonist John Heney, and Leo Sowerby. She married Edwin B. Libbey and they had one son.

Libbey belonged to the American Society of Composers, Authors and Publishers (ASCAP), and won an ASCAP award in 1961. "Mango" and some of her other songs were recorded by Petula Clark, Rosemary Clooney, Nat King Cole, Marion Ryan, and Ringo Shiina.

As Q'Adrianne Rohde, Libbey copyrighted a drawing in 1973 called The Unity Eagle. Her works were recorded by Columbia Records and published by G. Schirmer Inc. and Lawson Gould Music Publishers. Her compositions include:

== List of compositions ==
=== Ballet ===
- Bee Learns to Dance (piano and cello)
- Set Free

=== Band ===
- Percussive Positive

=== Chamber ===
- Essence (piano)
- Moving Tides (harp)
- Orange Moon (flute and piano)

=== Operetta ===
- Gretchen's Dream (for children)

=== Orchestra ===
- Impressions of Leaking Faucet (tone poem)
- Introspect (symphony in one movement)
- Lost Forest (tone poem)

=== Play ===
- Cry Out, Tragic Ode

=== Vocal ===
- "Chinchilla"
- Cry Out (chorus)
- "Give Honor to God"
- "Mangos" (lyrics by Sid Wayne)
- "Silver Bird" (with Charles Tobias)
- Tolling Bells (chorus)
- Wee Little Boy (women's chorus)
- "Wild Horses Run Free"
