= Chamber Music Detroit =

Chamber Music Detroit, formerly the Chamber Music Society of Detroit, was founded in 1944 and is the tenth oldest chamber music series in the United States as recognized by Chamber Music America. It is widely respected as metropolitan Detroit's anchor organization for chamber music.

Chamber Music Detroit's offerings include its flagship eight-concert Signature Series at Seligman Performing Arts Center in Beverly Hills, Michigan, as well as concerts in Detroit, Grosse Pointe and at Oakland University in Rochester.

== History ==
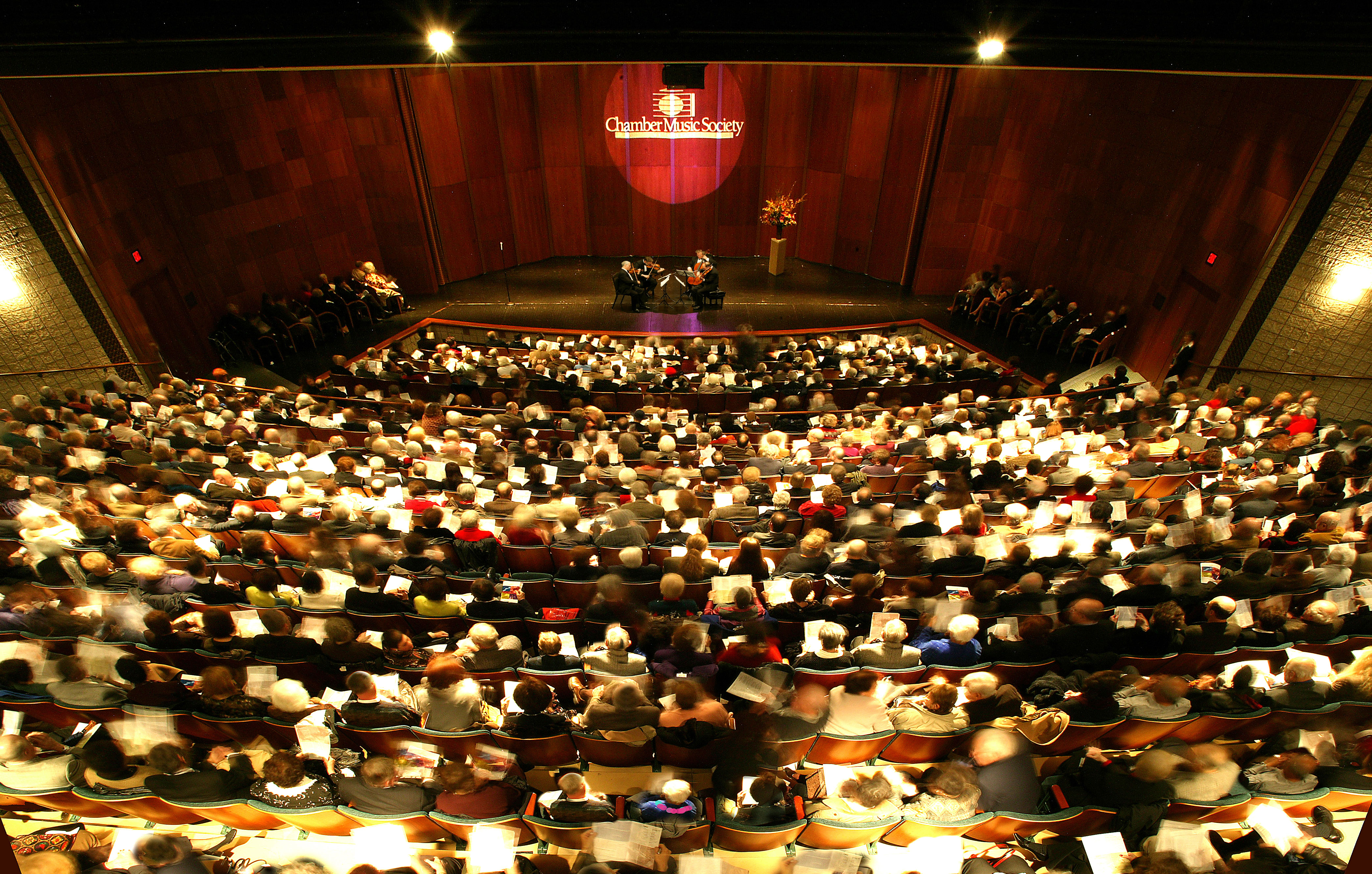
Chamber Music Detroit presents its Signature series at the 724-seat Seligman Performing Arts Center, located on the campus of Detroit Country Day School in Beverly Hills, Michigan.

Founded in 1944 by pianist, educator and internationally syndicated radio host Dr. Karl Haas, Chamber Music Detroit began as an informal association of people brought together for the purpose of listening to chamber music. Haas instituted lectures (the forerunners to his popular syndicated radio program "Adventures in Good Music") at the Detroit Public Library to inform the public about upcoming concerts. During its first ten seasons, the Chamber Music Society of Detroit (known in its earliest years as the Chamber Music Festival) presented its concerts at the Detroit Institute of Arts Lecture Hall. Until the late 1960s, Chamber Music Society of Detroit ensembles often comprised the first chair musicians of the Detroit Symphony Orchestra, including such artists as Josef Gingold and Mischa Mischakoff, as well as Haas himself as pianist.

In 1969, the leadership of the Chamber Music Society passed from Karl Haas to Dr. Zalman "Tiny" Konikow; from this point forward, the Chamber Music Society of Detroit invited touring artists and ensembles from around the globe to perform on its series. During his 25-year tenure as president, Tiny Konikow showcased the talents of many up-and-coming musicians. Most notable are the Chamber Music Society of Detroit's early presentations of Emanuel Ax, Gidon Kremer, Yo-Yo Ma, Murray Perahia and the Tokyo String Quartet, as well as near-annual performances by the Guarneri Quartet and the Beaux Arts Trio. Under Tiny Konikow's leadership, the Chamber Music Society of Detroit played a crucial role in the preservation and renovation of Detroit's Orchestra Hall by becoming, in 1978, its first permanent tenant since the Detroit Symphony had left the hall decades before.

In 1995, Lois R. Beznos became President of Chamber Music Detroit, after serving as Chair of the Board of Trustees since 1987. Under Lois Beznos' tenure as president, the organization more than tripled its subscriber base and its budget while developing community collaborations, adding professional staff and instituting comprehensive education programs. She established a collaboration with the Wayne State University Department of Music in 1995, introducing master classes by Chamber Music Detroit series artists. Gradually increasing its scope over the years, the education program evolved into an intensive Two-Week Ensemble Residency Program encompassing school and community collaborations throughout metropolitan Detroit.

In 1996, Chamber Music Detroit along with seven other chamber music presenters in the United States, including the Chamber Music Society of Lincoln Center and the Freer Gallery of Art at the Smithsonian Institution, was selected to present in perpetuity the winner of the Cleveland Quartet Award.

In the late 1990's the Detroit Symphony merged with Orchestra Hall and moved its concerts from Ford Auditorium in Detroit to Orchestra Hall, making fewer dates available to outside presenters like Chamber Music Detroit. At the same time, Detroit Country Day School opened its newly built concert facility, Seligman Performing Arts Center. Chamber Music Detroit presented the inaugural concert at Seligman featuring Orpheus Chamber Orchestra and moved its entire series to the new hall in the fall of 2000.

In 2001, Lois Beznos worked with the members of the Kalichstein-Laredo-Robinson Trio and nineteen other U.S. presenters to launch an award to recognize and provide performance and recording opportunities to a gifted early-career piano trio. The Kalichstein-Laredo-Robinson International Trio Award was run by Chamber Music Detroit for four biennial cycles and brought wider recognition to four winning piano trios: the Claremont Trio, Trio Con Trio Copenhagen, the Atos Trio and the Morgenstern Trio.

In December 2010, Lois R. Beznos stepped down from the presidency of the Chamber Music Society of Detroit. After a national search, she was succeeded by Dr. Stephen Wogaman, a pianist and former student of Beaux Arts Trio pianist Menahem Pressler.

Under Steve Wogaman’s leadership, the organization has sought to expand Chamber Music Detroit’s reach beyond its flagship concert series and engage new audiences in urban and suburban locations across Metro Detroit. Partnering with Wayne State University and Oakland University, concert series were instituted on both campuses. In recent seasons concerts have also taken place at Christ Church Grosse Pointe and the War Memorial in Grosse Pointe, Pontiac’s Flagstar Strand Theatre, the Village Theatre at Cherry Hill in Canton, and several venues in downtown Detroit, including the Cube at Orchestra Hall, Music Hall and Schaver Music Recital Hall. Concurrently, the organization adopted a multi-year plan to bring about more equity and inclusion in its programming, staff and board membership.

With the onset of COVID-19 in March 2020, the organization's expansion grew to embrace audiences across the United States through Chamber Music Detroit’s innovative CameraMusic platform, through which the organization shared its own in-house webcasting capacity with partnering organizations across the U.S. and Canada, presenting webcast concerts during periods when live performances were not possible. By the end of 2021, Chamber Music Detroit had partnered with over 60 organizations to present webcasts that have been viewed in 48 U.S. states and over 50 foreign countries.

== Chronology ==
1944	Founded by Karl Haas
1944–1968	Karl Haas, President
1969–1994	Zalman "Tiny" Konikow, President
1995–2010	Lois R. Beznos, President
2011–Present	Stephen Wogaman, President

== Artists ==
Among the scores of international artists who have appeared on the Chamber Music Society of Detroit series are: Elly Ameling, Emanuel Ax, Daniel Barenboim, Joshua Bell, Yefim Bronfman, Aaron Copland, James Ehnes, Leon Fleisher, James Galway, Richard Goode. Denyce Graves, Lynn Harrell, Daniel Hope, Dmitri Hvorostovsky, Gidon Kremer, Alicia de Larrocha, Yo-Yo Ma, Midori, Jessye Norman, Murray Perahia, Itzhak Perlman, Seiji Ozawa, Jon Kimura Parker, Jean-Pierre Rampal, Andras Schiff, Gil Shaham, Isaac Stern, Richard Stoltzman, Jean-Yves Thibaudet, Daniil Trifonov, Dawn Upshaw, Krystian Zimerman and Pinchas Zukerman.

Chamber ensembles have included the Academy of St. Martin-in-the-Fields, Beaux Arts Trio, the Cleveland Quartet, the Danish String Quartet, the Emerson String Quartet, the English Chamber Orchestra, the Guarneri String Quartet, Imani Winds, the Juilliard String Quartet, the Kalichstein-Laredo-Robinson Trio, Orpheus Chamber Orchestra, and the Tokyo String Quartet.

== Commissions and premieres ==
During its first ten years, the Chamber Music Society of Detroit presented the Detroit premieres of works by Ernest Bloch, Ernest Chausson, Ernst von Dohnányi, Gabriel Fauré, Darius Milhaud, Francis Poulenc, Serge Prokofiev, Maurice Ravel, Heitor Villa-Lobos and others. During its second decade, several world premieres were presented, including works by Michigan composers Ross Lee Finney and Leslie Bassett.

Other notable premieres and commissions include:

1953: Samuel Barber, Summer Music for Wind Quintet, commissioned by the Chamber Music Society of Detroit in honor of its 10th anniversary. The Chamber Music Society was nationally recognized for being the first organization to commission a work by public subscription.

1968: Ulysses Kay, Scherzi Musicale, commissioned by the Chamber Music Society of Detroit in celebration of its 25th season.

1999: Charles Wuorinen, String Quartet No. 4, commissioned in collaboration with the Chamber Music Society of Lincoln Center, El Paso Pro Musica and Chamber Music Northwest.

2002: Gunther Schuller Quartet No. 4, world premiere performance by the Juilliard String Quartet.

2007: Richard Danielpour, Book of Hours, co-commissioned for the Kalichstein-Laredo-Robinson Trio and viola by the Chamber Music Society of Detroit and six collaborating national presenters.

2009: Ellen Taaffe Zwilich, Quintet for String Quartet and Saxophone, co-commissioned for the Pacifica Quartet and saxophone by the Chamber Music Society of Detroit, Arizona Friends of Chamber Music, Fontana Chamber Arts and Michigan State University.

2009: Ellen Taaffe Zwilich, Septet for Piano Trio and String Quartet, co-commissioned for the Kalichstein-Laredo-Robinson Trio and the Miami String Quartet by the Chamber Music Society of Detroit (made possible by a gift from Geraldine Schwartz); the 92nd Street Y; The Abe Fortas Chamber Music Concerts of the John F. Kennedy Center for the Performing Arts; Kent/Blossom Music; Regional Arts at the Raymond F. Kravis Center for the Performing Arts; Philharmonic Society of Orange County; Ruth Eckerd Hall; Denver Friends of Chamber Music; Friends of Chamber Music, Portland OR; Virginia Festival of the Arts; Duke Performance; Hudson Valley Chamber Music Circle; through the International Arts Foundation, Inc.

2012: "Fragments," including Fra(nz)g-mentation by Bruce Adolphe; Marian Tropes by Charles Wuorinen; Finale: Presto, by John Harbison; Reflections on the Theme B-A-C-H; From the Fifth Book by Stephen Hartke and Mozart Effects by Vijay Iyer. Commissioned by the Brentano String Quartet and the following co-commissioners: Caramoor Center for the Arts, Katonah, NY; Carnegie Hall, New York, NY; Chamber Music Northwest, Portland, OR; Chamber Music Society of Detroit with support from Ruth Rattner and Ann and Norman Katz; onStage at Connecticut College, New London, CT; Da Camera of Houston; Fontana Chamber Arts, Kalamazoo, MI; Hopkins Center, Dartmouth College, Hanover, NH; Krannert Center for the Performing Arts, University of Illinois, Urbana, IL; Luther College, Decorah, IA; Rockport Music, Rockport, MA; Judith and David Falk for Salt Bay Chamberfest, Damariscotta, ME; San Francisco Performances; and Spivey Hall at Clayton State University, Morrow, GA.

2012: Bright Sheng: Dance Capriccio for Piano and String Quartet (World Premiere); Shanghai Quartet with Peter Serkin, piano.

2014: Charles Wuorinen: Intrada, for solo piano (World Premiere), written for and performed by Peter Serkin.

2016: Vijay Iyer: Time, Place, Action for Piano and String Quartet (Midwest premiere), performed by Vijay Iyer and the Brentano String Quartet. Co-commissioned by Chamber Music Detroit.

2019: Jessie Montgomery: Trading Fours, for four string quartets (Attacca, Catalyst, Dover and Harlem Quartets). World Premiere, commissioned by Chamber Music Detroit in honor of its 75th anniversary with support from Chamber Music Detroit audience members.

2019: Kevin Puts, Home, for string quartet, for the Miro Quartet, co-commissioned by Chamber Music Detroit, Orcas Island Chamber Music Festival, Chamber Music Northwest, Chamber Music Monterey Bay, Chamber Music Tulsa and Rockport Music.

2022: Stewart Goodyear: Phoenix (U.S. Premiere) for solo piano, performed by Stewart Goodyear.

2022: Various Composers: CQ Minute for String Quartet (10 short works, by Joan Tower, Andy Akiho, Billy Childs, Angelica Negrón, Kevin Puts, Kishi Bashi, Caroline Shaw, Paquito D'Rivera, Jessie Montgomery and Winner(s), Emerging Composer Competition). In celebration of the Catalyst Quartet’s 10th anniversary. Co-commissioned by Chamber Music Detroit.

2022: Jeff Scott, Fallen Petals of Nameless Flowers (World Premiere, Commissioned by Chamber Music Detroit), performed by Imani Winds with Robert Laidler, poet/narrator, Seth Parker Woods, cello and Cory Smythe, piano.

== Education programs ==
Chamber Music Detroit's education programming includes an annual series of pre-concert talks, master classes with international artists and ensemble residencies.

The ensemble residency program brings string quartets and other artists and ensembles to Metro Detroit schools each season, reaching students of all ages with both in-person and digital lecture-demonstrations, as well as coaching sessions for advanced high school and college ensembles. (In 2020 and 2021 during the COVID pandemic, most live educational programs were suspended due to school closures and concert cancellations.)

The program has reached many thousands of students since its inception in 1995. The Aeolus Quartet, American String Quartet, Borromeo String Quartet, Brentano String Quartet, Cavani Quartet, Claremont Trio, Classical Jam, Cypress String Quartet, Juilliard String Quartet, Miami String Quartet, Miro Quartet, Pacifica Quartet and Shanghai Quartet are among the many ensembles that have participated. In addition, pianist Menahem Pressler, violinists Joseph Silverstein and William Preucil, mezzo-soprano Denyce Graves and clarinetists Richard Stoltzman and Franklin Cohen have presented master classes. In 2010-2011, two members of The Romeros conducted the residency, marking the first time a guitar ensemble had participated in the program.

== Sources ==
- Anonymous (September 23, 2013). "Oakland University partners with Chamber Music Society of Detroit on concert series" Oakland Press
- Baetens, Melody. (July 8, 2020). "Chamber Music Society of Detroit connects musicians and fans during pandemic," Detroit News
- Cohn, Fred (January/February, 2009). "Making Good in Motown", Chamber Music Magazine.
- Heyman, Barbara B. (1992). Samuel Barber, the Composer and His Music, Oxford University Press, ISBN 0-19-509058-6. pp 359–373.
- Lyman, David. (September 27, 2018). "In its 75th season, chamber music group is thinking regionally" Detroit Free Press
- Rigg, Sarah A. (November 6, 2008). "Executive Profile: Lois R. Beznos, president, Chamber Music Society of Detroit," Oakland Business Review.
- "Three for the Road," Chamber Music Magazine, March/April, 2005.
- Wu, June Q. (September 15, 2008). "Chamber Still Hitting the High Notes at 65," Oakland Press.
