= Improvisations (Stéphane Grappelli album) =

Studio album by Stéphane Grappelli
- Released: 1957
- Recorded: February 6, 14, and April 10, 1956
- Genre: Jazz
- Label: Mercury

Stéphane Grappelli chronology
Improvisations (1957)	Feeling + Finesse = Jazz (1962)

Professional ratings
Review scores
Source	Rating
Allmusic	2.5/5 stars
The Penguin Guide to Jazz Recordings	3.5/4 stars

Improvisations is a jazz album recorded in 1956, in Paris, by Stéphane Grappelli (violin), Maurice Vander (piano), Pierre Michelot (double bass) and Baptist "Mac Kac" Reiles (drums). It consists of mostly jazz standards.

== Track listing ==
1. "The Lady Is a Tramp" (Lorenz Hart, Richard Rodgers) – 3:05
2. "Fascinating Rhythm" (George Gershwin, Ira Gershwin) – 2:55
3. "Dans la Vie" (Louiguy) – 3:54
4. "Cheek to Cheek" (Irving Berlin) – 3:10
5. "A Nightingale Sang in Berkeley Square" (Maschwitz, Sherwin) – 3:11
6. "Taking a Chance on Love" (Duke, Fetter, Latouche) – 3:02
7. "'S Wonderful" (Gershwin, Gershwin) – 2:30
8. "Someone to Watch Over Me" (Gershwin, Gershwin) – 2:58
9. "If I Had You" (Campbell, Connelly, Shapiro) – 3:20
10. "Body and Soul" (Eyton, Green, Heyman, Sour) – 2:35
11. "I Want to Be Happy" (Caesar, Youmans) – 2:14
12. "She's Funny That Way" (Moret, Whiting) – 2:29
13. "Time After Time" (Cahn, Styne) – 2:44
14. "Just One of Those Things" (Cole Porter) – 2:30
15. "Slow en Ré Majeur" (Wilder) – 4:01
16. "Taking a Chance on Love" (Duke, Fetter, Latouche) – 3:01
