= Summer Music =

Composition for wind quintet by Samuel Barber

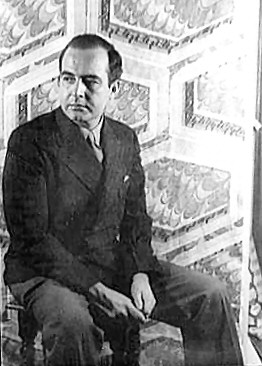
Samuel Barber in 1944

Summer Music, Op. 31, is a classical composition for wind quintet by Samuel Barber.

== Background ==
Samuel Barber received a commission in 1953 from the Chamber Music Society of Detroit to write a piece of music for string instruments and woodwind instruments. Barber drew from some of his previous work, including the unpublished orchestral piece Horizon (1945), as material for Summer Music. Originally meant to be a septet for three woodwinds, three strings, and piano, Summer Music evolved into a quintet as Barber experimented with some tuning études written by hornist John Barrows for himself and his colleagues in the New York Woodwind Quintet.

On March 20, 1956, as part of the twelfth season of the Chamber Music Society, the premiere of Summer Music took place at the Detroit Institute of Arts, performed by the first-desk players of the Detroit Symphony Orchestra: James Pellerite (flute), Arno Mariotti (oboe), Albert Luconi (clarinet), Charles Sirard (bassoon), and Ray Alonge (horn). The performance was received warmly by the audience, its success partially attributable to the audience's investment in the piece. Instead of a commissioning fee, Barber agreed to accept donations from the audience, with the Chamber Music Society acting as guarantor for a minimum of $2000.

Summer Music is Barber's only chamber composition for wind instruments, and has become a staple of the wind-quintet repertory.

== Composition ==
Summer Music showcases each instrument of the wind quintet for which it was composed, namely the flute, oboe, bassoon, clarinet, and horn. The piece is in a single movement, and has been described as ranging from lyrical and lazy to energetic and contrapuntal.
