= String Quartet No. 6 (Shostakovich) =

1956 composition by Dmitri Shostakovich

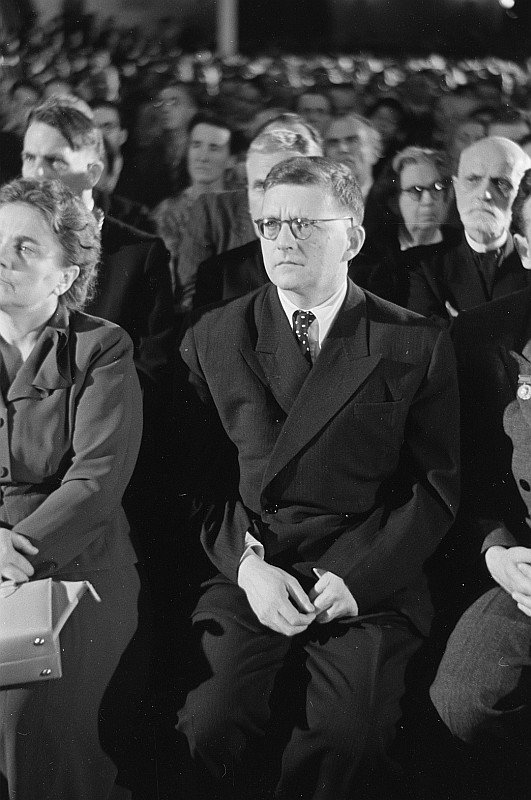
Dmitri Shostakovich in 1950

Dmitri Shostakovich's String Quartet No. 6 in G major, Op. 101, was composed in the summer of 1956. It was premiered by the Beethoven Quartet in October 1956. It carries no dedication. The Beethoven Quartet recorded it on the Mezhdunarodnaya Kniga label.

== Structure ==
It consists of four movements:

1. Allegretto
2. Moderato con moto
3. Lento (attacca)
4. Lento — Allegretto

The playing time is approximately 22 minutes.

The Allegretto first movement creates a carefree mood using nursery tunes. The second movement is a cheerful round dance in E♭ major, the third movement a chaconne in B♭ minor. The final movement leads into a complex Allegretto showing the influence of both Alban Berg's Lyric Suite and Richard Strauss's Metamorphosen. The quartet also features the only vertical appearance of the DSCH motif (the notes D, E♭, C, and B♮ played at the same time), at the final cadence at the end of each movement.

The quartet was written in Komarovo, Russia.
