= Page 3 – A Collection of Her Most Famous Songs =

Compilation album by Patti Page
- Released: October 1955
- Genre: Traditional pop
- Label: Mercury

Patti Page compilation album chronology
Page 2 – A Collection of Her Most Famous Songs (1955)	Page 3 – A Collection of Her Most Famous Songs (1955)	Page 4 – A Collection of Her Most Famous Songs (1956)

Page 3 – Sings a Collection of Her Most Famous Songs is a compilation album by Patti Page. It was released in October 1955 on Mercury Records. It was distributed as a vinyl LP.

This was the third album in a series of four, titled "Page 1" to "Page 4.

== Track listing ==
Track listing for Page Three – Sings a Collection of Her Most Famous Songs
Track number	Title	Songwriter(s)	Length
A1	Where Are You?	Jimmy McHugh / Harold Adamson	3:10
A2	The Touch of Your Lips	Ray Noble	2:44
A3	Moon Over Miami	Joe Burke / Edgar Leslie	3:13
A4	It's a Sin to Tell a Lie	Billy Mayhew	2:22
A5	There Is No Greater Love	Isham Jones / Marty Symes	3:03
A6	Until the Real Thing Comes Along	Alberta Nichols / Mann Holiner / Sammy Cahn / Saul Chaplin / L.E. Freeman	2:59
B1	Did I Remember?	Walter Donaldson / Harold Adamson	3:01
B2	These Foolish Things	Harry Link / Holt Marvell / Jack Strachey	3:21
B3	Blue Hawaii	Ralph Rainger / Leo Robin	2:41
B4	They Can't Take That Away from Me	George Gershwin / Ira Gershwin	2:31
B5	Remember Me?	Harry Warren / Al Dubin	2:20
B6	Where or When	Richard Rodgers / Lorenz Hart	3:10
