= Irving Gordon =

American songwriter (1915–1996)

- Gordon, c. 1950

Background information
- Born: Irving Gordon; February 14, 1915; Brooklyn, New York City, U.S
- Origin: Brooklyn, New York City, U.S.
- Died: December 1, 1996 (aged 81) Malibu, California, U.S
- Occupation: Songwriter

Irving Gordon (February 14, 1915 – December 1, 1996) was an American songwriter known for his contributions to the Americana genre.

== Early life and education ==
Gordon was born in Brooklyn, New York City, to a Jewish family, and later lived on Coney Island. He was named Israel Goldner but later changed his name to Irving Gordon. As a child, he studied violin.

== Career ==
After attending public schools in New York City, Gordon worked in the Catskill Mountains at some of the resort hotels in the area. While working there, he took to writing parody lyrics to some of the popular songs of the day. In the 1930s, he took a job with the music publishing firm headed by talent agent Irving Mills. Though he initially wrote only lyrics, he eventually began to write music as well.

Gordon was introduced to Duke Ellington in 1937. Ellington sometimes invited him to put lyrics to his compositions. However, working with Ellington was a difficult commission, since most of the Ellington songs were instrumental pieces whose singable potential only emerged after they had been played and recorded by the soloists in the Ellington orchestra. While working as Ellington's lyricist, Gordon wrote the lyrics to "Prelude to a Kiss". He, like many composers, worked out of the Brill Building in Manhattan for many years.

After writing "Mister and Mississippi", Gordon decided he enjoyed puns on state names and later wrote "Delaware", which was a hit for Perry Como.

His 1956 hit for Patti Page, "Mama from the Train", was written to describe the love of a mother who had been born in the old country. Although the lyrics identify her as "Pennsylvania Dutch", the shifts into and out of a minor key mark the melody as Eastern European, and it was widely perceived as a tribute to a Yiddish-speaking mother.

Gordon is perhaps best known for his song "Unforgettable". He also wrote "Allentown Jail", which was played by numerous musicians and told the story of a man who stole a diamond for his girlfriend and ended up in the Allentown jail, unable to make bail. This song was recorded by singers such as Edith Piaf.

Late in his life, Gordon won a Grammy Award for Song of the Year when Natalie Cole re-recorded her father Nat King Cole's earlier hit of "Unforgettable." Gordon wrote both the lyrics and music for "Unforgettable."

Gordon did not care for rock music, which he said was composed not of "melodies but maladies." Gordon told the Los Angeles Times that by 1960 the vogue for rhymed words and hummable melodies had passed, "So I became a tennis pro. I have many lives."

Gordon's obituary claimed that he wrote the Abbott and Costello baseball comedy routine, "Who's on First?." This claim was never made by Gordon when he was alive, and others have also claimed authorship.

Gordon is noted for his contribution to music and lyrics of the Americana genre. For example, his song "Two Brothers" was about the American Civil War.

For several years before his death, he wrote a musical about Sigmund Freud.

== Death ==
Irving Gordon died of multiple myeloma cancer in Malibu, California. He was survived by two sons.

== Partial selection of his published songs ==
- "Allentown Jail"
- "Be Anything, But Darling Be Mine"
- "Blue Prelude" (lyrics by Gordon Jenkins; music by Joe Bishop)
- "Delaware" (Perry Como hit vocal)
- "Mama from the Train" (Patti Page hit vocal)
- "Me, Myself and I" (Billie Holiday hit vocal, co-written with Allen Roberts and Alvin S. Kaufman)
- "Mister and Mississippi" (Patti Page hit vocal)
- "Nine Tenths of the Tennessee River" (Moon Mullican country blues ballad)
- "Prelude to a Kiss" (lyrics by Gordon and Irving Mills; music by Duke Ellington )
- "Two Brothers" (Civil War song)
- "Unforgettable" (major hit for Nat King Cole, Grammy Award in 1992)
- "What Will I Tell My Heart" (Bing Crosby hit vocal)
- "Sinner or Saint" (1952)
- "Sorta on the Border" (1953)
- "The Kentuckian Song" (Eddy Arnold vocal from the Burt Lancaster film The Kentuckian, 1955)
- "Rollin' Stone" (Perry Como vocal)
- "Too Fat for the Chimney" (1953) (Gisele Mackenzie, recorded on "Christmas Songs For Bad Little Boys & Girls"). Note - his Original last name was spelled Goldner. His grandmother was from a part of Austria-Hungary now in Slovakia.
- "Unbelievable" (1954) Nat "King" Cole
