= Jaime González (composer) =

Jaime González (born March 7, 1956, Quillota) is a Chilean composer and music educator. He graduated from the University of Chile with a degree in music composition in 1981. In 1982 he joined the music faculties of the University of Playa Ancha and the University of Talca. He became a professor at the Universidad Metropolitana de Ciencias de la Educación in 1987. He won prizes from his 1978 motet Jesucristo sálvanos at the Chilean National Choir Federation Competition and Beethoven Association Competition. His Obertura de concerto won the third prize of the Overture Composition Competition of the University of Chile in 1986.
