= List of UK charts and number-one singles (1952–1969)/NME =

No. (Note: According to The Official Charts Company and the canonical sources, chronologically, which number one it was.)	Artist	Single	NME (Note: NME is considered by The Official Charts Company as the canonical source for number-one singles from the charts' inception until 10 March 1960. The names, singles and duration of the number-ones are taken from The Official Charts Company and from NME.)	Record Mirror (Note: The names, singles and duration of the number-ones are from the Record Mirror.)	Melody Maker	Disc	Record Retailer (Note: Record Retailer is considered by The Official Charts Company as the canonical source for number-one singles from 10 March 1960 until 15 February 1969 when Retailer and the BBC jointly commissioned the British Music Record Bureau (BMRB) to compile the chart. When BMRB started compiling the chart is generally regarded as the beginning of an official chart. The names, singles and duration of the number-ones are taken from The Official Charts Company.)
No.	Artist	Single	Number-one				
1	Al Martino	"Here in My Heart"	9	—	—	—	—
2	Jo Stafford	"You Belong to Me"	1	—	—	—	—
3	Kay Starr	"Comes A-Long A-Love"	1	—	—	—	—
4	Eddie Fisher	"Outside Of Heaven"	1	—	—	—	—
5	Perry Como	"Don't Let The Stars Get In Your Eyes"	5	—	—	—	—
6	Guy Mitchell	"She Wears Red Feathers"	4	—	—	—	—
7	The Stargazers	"Broken Wings"	1	—	—	—	—
8	Lita Roza	"(How Much Is) That Doggie in the Window?"	1	—	—	—	—
9	Frankie Laine	"I Believe"	18	—	—	—	—
10	Eddie Fisher	"I'm Walking Behind You"	1	—	—	—	—
11	Mantovani	"Song from Moulin Rouge"	1	—	—	—	—
12	Guy Mitchell	"Look At That Girl"	6	—	—	—	—
13	Frankie Laine	"Hey Joe"	2	—	—	—	—
14	David Whitfield	"Answer Me"	2*	—	—	—	—
15	Frankie Laine	"Answer Me"	8*	—	—	—	—
16	Eddie Calvert	"Oh Mein Papa"	9	—	—	—	—
17	The Stargazers	"I See the Moon"	9	—	—	—	—
18	Doris Day	"Secret Love"	9	—	—	—	—
19	Johnnie Ray	"Such a Night"	1	—	—	—	—
20	David Whitfield	"Cara Mia"	10	—	—	—	—
21	Kitty Kallen	"Little Things Mean a Lot"	1	—	—	—	—
22	Frank Sinatra	"Three Coins in the Fountain"	3	—	—	—	—
23	Don Cornell	"Hold My Hand"	5	—	—	—	—
24	Vera Lynn	"My Son, My Son"	2	—	—	—	—
25	Rosemary Clooney	"This Ole House"	1	—	—	—	—
26	Winifred Atwell	"Let's Have Another Party"	5	—	—	—	—
27	Dickie Valentine	"The Finger Of Suspicion"	3	—	—	—	—
28	Rosemary Clooney	"Mambo Italiano"	3	3	—	—	—
—	Dean Martin	"Naughty Lady of Shady Lane"	No	1	—	—	—
29	Ruby Murray	"Softly, Softly"	3	1	—	—	—
30	Tennessee Ernie Ford	"Give Me Your Word"	7	9	—	—	—
31	Perez "Prez" Prado and his Orchestra	"Cherry Pink (and Apple Blossom White)"	2	No	—	—	—
32	Tony Bennett	"Stranger in Paradise"	2	6	—	—	—
33	Eddie Calvert	"Cherry Pink (and Apple Blossom White)"	4	No	—	—	—
34	Jimmy Young	"Unchained Melody"	3	No	—	—	—
—	Al Hibbler	"Unchained Melody"	No	4	—	—	—
35	Alma Cogan	"Dreamboat"	2	2	—	—	—
36	Slim Whitman	"Rose Marie"	11	9	—	—	—
—	Frankie Laine	"Cool Water"	No	1	—	—	—
37	Jimmy Young	"The Man from Laramie"	4	5	—	—	—
38	Johnston Brothers	"Hernando's Hideaway"	2	No	—	—	—
39	Bill Haley & His Comets	"Rock Around the Clock"	5	8	—	—	—
40	Dickie Valentine	"Christmas Alphabet"	2	No	—	—	—
41	Tennessee Ernie Ford	"Sixteen Tons"	4	5	—	—	—
—	Lou Busch	"Zambesi"	No	2	—	—	—
42	Dean Martin	"Memories Are Made of This"	4	2	—	—	—
43	The Dream Weavers	"It's Almost Tomorrow"	3	3	3	—	—
44	Kay Starr with the Hugo Winterhalter Orchestra	"Rock And Roll Waltz"	1	No	No	—	—
45	Winifred Atwell	"The Poor People of Paris"	3	5	2	—	—
46	Ronnie Hilton	"No Other Love"	6	4	5	—	—
47	Pat Boone	"I'll Be Home"	5	6	5	—	—
48	Frankie Lymon and The Teenagers	"Why Do Fools Fall in Love"	3	3	5	—	—
49	Doris Day	"Whatever Will Be, Will Be (Que Sera, Sera)"	6	6	5	—	—
50	Anne Shelton	"Lay Down Your Arms"	4	4	5	—	—
51	Frankie Laine	"A Woman in Love"	4	3	3	—	—
52	Johnnie Ray	"Just Walking in the Rain"	7	7	9	—	—
53	Guy Mitchell	"Singing the Blues"	3*	3	2	—	—
54	Tommy Steele	"Singing the Blues"	1	1	No	—	—
55	Frankie Vaughan	"The Garden of Eden"	4*	3	4	—	—
56	Tab Hunter	"Young Love"	7	7	8	—	—
57	Lonnie Donegan	"Cumberland Gap"	5	4	4	—	—
58	Guy Mitchell	"Rock-a-Billy"	1	No	No	—	—
59	Andy Williams	"Butterfly"	2	5	4	—	—
60	Johnnie Ray	"Yes Tonight Josephine"	3	4	4	—	—
61	Lonnie Donegan	"Puttin' On the Style" / "Gamblin' Man"	2	1	No	—	—
62	Elvis Presley	"All Shook Up"	7	7	8	—	—
63	Paul Anka	"Diana"	9	8	8	—	—
64	The Crickets	"That'll Be the Day"	3	4	1	—	—
—	Elvis Presley	"Party"	No	No	2	—	—
65	Harry Belafonte	"Mary's Boy Child"	7	5	7	—	—
—	Johnny Otis Show	"Ma, He's Making Eyes At Me"	No	2	2*	—	—
66	Jerry Lee Lewis	"Great Balls of Fire"	2	1	2*	—	—
67	Elvis Presley	"Jailhouse Rock"	3	3	2	1*	—
68	Michael Holliday	"The Story of My Life"	2	2	2	3*	—
69	Perry Como	"Magic Moments"	8	7	7	8	—
70	Marvin Rainwater	"Whole Lotta Woman"	3	4	4	3	—
71	Connie Francis	"Who's Sorry Now"	6	6	6	6	—
72	Vic Damone	"On the Street Where You Live"	2*	No	No	No	—
73	The Everly Brothers	"All I Have to Do Is Dream" / "Claudette"	7*	9	9	8	—
74	The Kalin Twins	"When"	5	5	4	5	—
75	Connie Francis	"Carolina Moon" / "Stupid Cupid"	6	5	5	5	—
76	Tommy Edwards	"It's All in the Game"	3	No	No	No	—
—	The Everly Brothers	"Bird Dog"	No	3	3	2	—
77	Lord Rockingham's XI	"Hoots Mon"	3	4	3	8	—
78	Conway Twitty	"It's Only Make Believe"	5	4	7	3	—
79	Jane Morgan	"The Day the Rains Came"	1	No	No	No	—
80	Elvis Presley	"I Got Stung" / "One Night"	3	5	3	3	—
81	Shirley Bassey with Wally Stott & His Orchestra	"As I Love You"	4	No	1	3	—
82	The Platters	"Smoke Gets in Your Eyes"	1	5	4	3	—
83	Russ Conway	"Side Saddle"	4	2	3	3	—
84	Buddy Holly	"It Doesn't Matter Anymore"	3	2	5	4	—
85	Elvis Presley	"A Fool Such As I" / "I Need Your Love Tonight"	5	7	4	4	—
86	Russ Conway	"Roulette"	2	1	1	1	—
87	Bobby Darin	"Dream Lover"	4	5	5	5	—
88	Cliff Richard and the Drifters	"Living Doll"	6	4	5	5	—
89	Craig Douglas	"Only Sixteen"	4	7	6	5	—
90	Jerry Keller	"Here Comes Summer"	1	No	No	2	—
91	Bobby Darin	"Mack the Knife"	2	No	No	No	—
92	Cliff Richard and The Shadows	"Travellin' Light"	5	7	6	6	—
93	Adam Faith	"What Do You Want?"	3*	5	3	2	—
94	Emile Ford and the Checkmates	"What Do You Want to Make Those Eyes at Me For?"	6*	2	5	6	—
95	Michael Holliday	"Starry Eyed"	1	No	No	1	—
96	Anthony Newley	"Why"	4	6	6	5	—
97	Adam Faith	"Poor Me"	2	1	1	1	1
