= List of UK top-ten singles in 1955 =

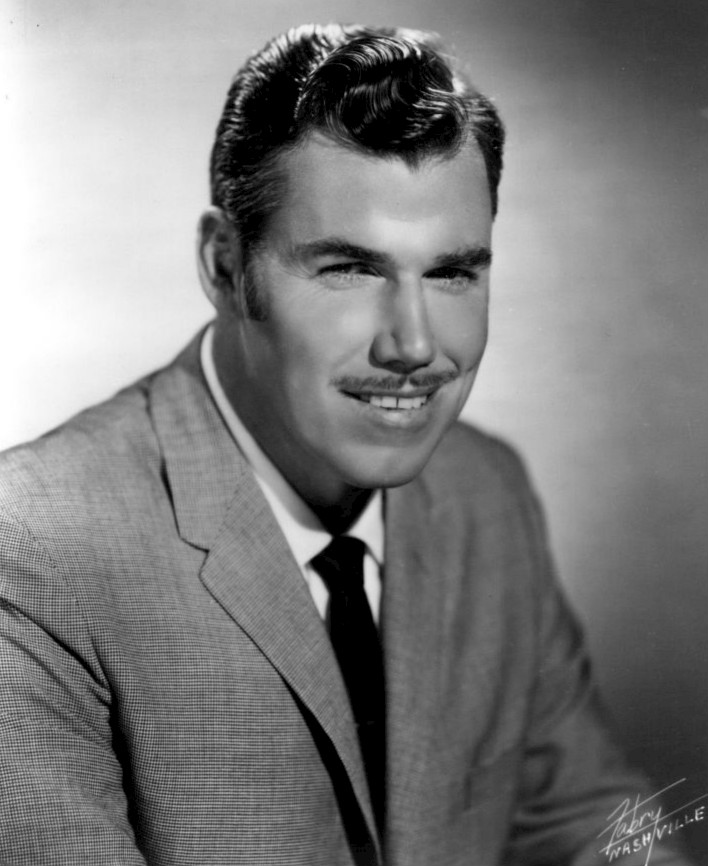
Slim Whitman achieved the best-selling single of 1955 with his recording of "Rose Marie", which spent 11 consecutive weeks at number-one, a record which remained unbroken for 36 years. Whitman scored a second top 10 hit later in the year with "Indian Love Call", which peaked at number seven.

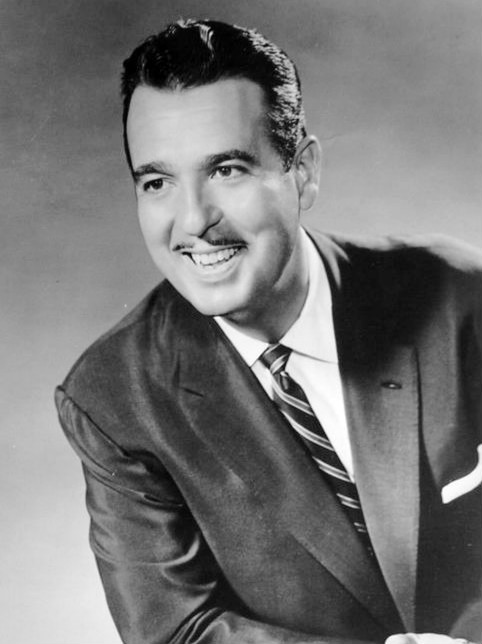
Tennessee Ernie Ford spent seven weeks at number-one in the UK charts this year with "Give Me Your Word", which remained in the top 10 for 18 weeks.

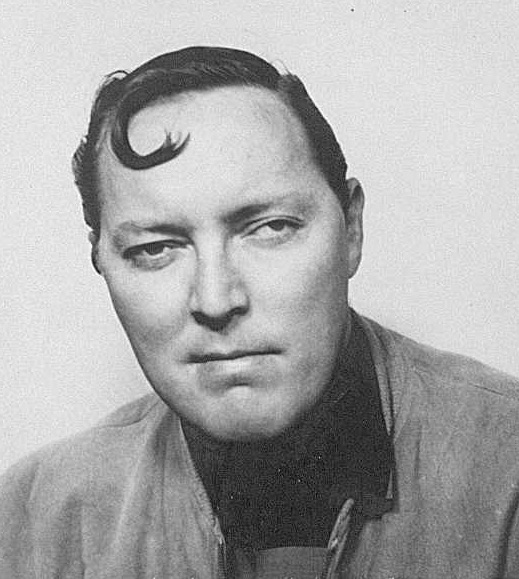
Bill Haley & His Comets (lead singer Bill Haley pictured) achieved two UK top 10 entries in 1955, including their signature song "Rock Around the Clock", which spent five non-consecutive weeks at number-one. As well as being the first single to sell one million copies in the UK alone, "Rock Around the Clock" went on to be ranked as the best-selling single of the 1950s.

The UK Singles Chart is one of many music charts compiled by the Official Charts Company that calculates the best-selling singles of the week in the United Kingdom. Before 2004, the chart was only based on the sales of physical singles. New Musical Express (NME) magazine had published the United Kingdom record charts for the first time in 1952. NME originally published only a top 12 (although the first chart had a couple of singles that were tied so a top 15 was announced) but this was gradually extended to encompass a top 20 by October 1954. This list shows singles that peaked in the Top 10 of the UK Singles Chart during 1955, as well as singles which peaked in 1954 and 1956 but were in the top 10 in 1955. The entry date is when the single appeared in the top 10 for the first time (week ending, as published by the Official Charts Company, which is six days after the chart is announced).

Eighty-one singles were in the top ten in 1955. Ten singles from 1954 remained in the top 10 for several weeks at the beginning of the year, while "Meet Me on the Corner" by Max Bygraves, "Never Do a Tango with an Eskimo" by Alma Cogan, "Suddenly There's a Valley" by Petula Clark and "Twenty Tiny Fingers" by The Stargazers were all released in 1955 but did not reach their peak until 1956. "No One But You" by Billy Eckstine, "The Finger of Suspicion" by Dickie Valentine with The Stargazers and "Heartbeat" by Ruby Murray were the songs from 1954 to reach their peak in 1955. Nineteen artists scored multiple entries in the top 10 in 1955. Bill Haley & His Comets, Malcolm Vaughan, Slim Whitman, Teresa Brewer and Tony Martin were among the many artists who achieved their first UK charting top 10 single in 1955.

The 1954 Christmas number-one, "Let's Have Another Party" by Winifred Atwell, remained at number-one for the first week of 1955. The first new number-one single of the year was "The Finger of Suspicion" by Dickie Valentine with The Stargazers. Overall, fifteen different singles peaked at number-one in 1955, with Dickie Valentine and Jimmy Young (2) having the joint most singles hit that position.

== Background ==
=== Multiple entries ===
Eighty-one singles charted in the top 10 in 1955, with seventy-one singles reaching their peak this year. Nine songs were recorded by several artists with each version reaching the top 10:

- "A Blossom Fell" – Dickie Valentine, Nat King Cole, Ronnie Hilton
- "Cherry Pink (and Apple Blossom White)" – Eddie Calvert, Pérez 'Prez' Prado and His Orchestra
- "Hey There" – Johnnie Ray, Rosemary Clooney
- "Let Me Go, Lover!" – Dean Martin, Ruby Murray, Teresa Brewer with The Lancers
- "Mr. Sandman" – Dickie Valentine, The Four Aces
- "Stranger in Paradise" – The Four Aces, Tony Bennett, Tony Martin
- "The Naughty Lady of Shady Lane" – The Ames Brothers, Dean Martin
- "Unchained Melody" – Al Hibbler, Jimmy Young, Les Baxter
- "Under the Bridges of Paris" – Dean Martin, Eartha Kitt

Nineteen artists scored multiple entries in the top 10 in 1955. Ruby Murray secured the record for most top 10 hits in 1955 with seven hit singles.

The Stargazers were one of a number of artists with three top-ten entries, including the number-one single "The Finger of Suspicion". Dean Martin, The Four Aces, Johnnie Ray and The Mellomen were among the other artists who had multiple top 10 entries in 1955.

=== Chart debuts ===
Twenty-seven artists achieved their first top 10 single in 1955, either as a lead or featured artist. Bill Haley & His Comets and Slim Whitman both had two other entries in their breakthrough year.

The following table (collapsed on desktop site) does not include acts who had previously charted as part of a group and secured their first top 10 solo single.

Artist	Number of top 10s	First entry	Chart position	Other entries
Bill Haley & His Comets	2	"Shake, Rattle and Roll"	4	"(We're Gonna) Rock Around the Clock" (1)
Tennessee Ernie Ford	1	"Give Me Your Word"	1	—
The Ames Brothers	1	"The Naughty Lady of Shady Lane"	6	—
Teresa Brewer	1	"Let Me Go, Lover!"	9	—
The Lancers	1	"Let Me Go, Lover!"	9	—
Ray Burns	1	"Mobile"	4	—
Johnny Brandon	1	"Tomorrow"	8	—
The Phantoms	1	"Tomorrow"	8	—
Anne Warren	1	"If Anyone Finds This, I Love You"	4	—
Pérez 'Prez' Prado and His Orchestra	1	"Cherry Pink (and Apple Blossom White) (Cerisier rose et pommier blanc)"	1	—
Tony Bennett	1	"Stranger in Paradise"	1	—
Eartha Kitt	1	"Under the Bridges of Paris"	7	—
The Crew-Cuts	1	"Earth Angel"	4	—
Tony Martin	1	"Stranger in Paradise"	6	—
The Ink Spots	1	"Melody of Love"	10	—
Al Hibbler	1	"Unchained Melody"	2	—
Les Baxter, His Chorus & Orchestra	1	"Unchained Melody"	1	—
Slim Whitman	2	"Rose Marie"	1	"Indian Love Call" (7)
Malcolm Vaughan	1	"Ev'ry Day of My Life"	5	—
Caterina Valente	1	"The Breeze and I"	5	—
Sammy Davis Jr.	1	"Love Me or Leave Me"	8	—
Cyril Stapleton and His Orchestra	1	"Blue Star"	2	—
Julie Dawn	1	"Blue Star"	2	—
Mitch Miller	1	"The Yellow Rose of Texas"	2	—
The Johnston Brothers	1	"Hernando's Hideaway"	1	—
Pat Boone	1	"Ain't That a Shame"	7	—
The George Chisholm Sour-Note Six	1	"Join In and Sing Again"	9	—

=== Songs from films ===
Original songs from various films entered the top 10 throughout the year. These included "Cherry Pink (and Apple Blossom White)" (from Underwater!), "Ready, Willing and Able" (Young at Heart), "Rose Marie" & "Indian Love Call" (Rose Marie), "John and Julie" (John and Juliet), "The Man from Laramie" (The Man from Laramie), "The Yellow Rose of Texas" (Giant) and "Rock Around the Clock" (Blackboard Jungle).

Additionally, "Stranger in Paradise" (from the film Kismet) was covered by several artists who took it into the top 10 (The Four Aces, Tony Bennett and Tony Martin) and "Unchained Melody - nominated for Best Original Song at the Academy Awards for the original version by Todd Duncan - was recorded by Al Hibbler, Jimmy Young and Les Baxter, His Chorus & Orchestra, while "Love Is a Many-Splendored Thing" from the film of the same name entered the charts in a version by The Four Aces featuring Al Alberts. "Hernando's Hideaway" from The Pajama Game reached the top 10 after being released by The Johnston Brothers, and Fats Domino's version of "Ain't That a Shame" - covered by Pat Boone - was used in "Shake, Rattle & Rock!".

=== Best-selling singles ===
Until 1970 there was no universally recognised year-end best-sellers list. However in 2011 the Official Charts Company released a list of the best-selling single of each year in chart history from 1952 to date. According to the list, "Rose Marie" by Slim Whitman is officially recorded as the biggest-selling single of 1955. "Rock Around the Clock" by Bill Haley & His Comets (1) was ranked as the best-selling single of the decade.

== Top-ten singles ==
Key

Symbol	Meaning
‡	Single peaked in 1954 but still in chart in 1955.
♦	Single released in 1955 but peaked in 1956.
(#)	Year-end best-selling single.
Entered	The date that the single first appeared in the chart.
Peak	Highest position that the single reached in the UK Singles Chart.

Entered (week ending)	Weeks in top 10	Single	Artist	Peak	Peak reached (week ending)	Weeks at peak
Singles in 1954
3 September 1954	16	"Hold My Hand" ‡ ^{[A]}	Don Cornell	1	8 October 1954	5
15 October 1954	13	"This Ole House" ‡ ^{[B]}	Rosemary Clooney	1	26 November 1954	1
15 October 1954	12	"My Son, My Son" ‡	Vera Lynn	1	5 November 1954	2
29 October 1954	10	"Rain Rain Rain" ‡ ^{[C]}	Frankie Laine & The Four Lads	8	29 October 1954	3
19 November 1954	14	"No One But You"	Billy Eckstine	3	14 January 1955	2
26 November 1954	7	"Let's Have Another Party" ‡	Winifred Atwell	1	3 December 1954	5
26 November 1954	7	"Santo Natale (Merry Christmas)" ‡	David Whitfield	2	3 December 1954	5
3 December 1954	9	"I Still Believe" ‡	Ronnie Hilton	3	17 December 1954	3
23 December 1954	14	"The Finger of Suspicion"	Dickie Valentine with The Stargazers	1	7 January 1955	3
23 December 1954	13	"Heartbeat"	Ruby Murray	3	28 January 1955	1
Singles in 1955
7 January 1955	11	"Mambo Italiano"	Rosemary Clooney & The Mellomen	1	14 January 1955	3
7 January 1955	6	"Mr. Sandman"	Dickie Valentine	5	4 February 1955	1
7 January 1955	8	"Shake, Rattle and Roll"	Bill Haley & His Comets	4	21 January 1955	2
14 January 1955	3	"I Can't Tell a Waltz from a Tango"	Alma Cogan	6	21 January 1955	1
14 January 1955	1	"Mr. Sandman"	The Four Aces	9	14 January 1955	1
28 January 1955	17	"Softly, Softly"	Ruby Murray	1	18 February 1955	3
28 January 1955	18	"Give Me Your Word" ^{[D]}	Tennessee Ernie Ford	1	11 March 1955	7
4 February 1955	4	"The Naughty Lady of Shady Lane"	The Ames Brothers	6	11 February 1955	1
4 February 1955	6	"The Naughty Lady of Shady Lane" ^{[E]}	Dean Martin	5	4 March 1955	1
18 February 1955	4	"Let Me Go, Lover!" ^{[F]}	Teresa Brewer with The Lancers	9	18 February 1955	2
25 February 1955	3	"Happy Days and Lonely Nights"	Ruby Murray	6	25 February 1955	1
4 March 1955	2	"Beyond the Stars"	David Whitfield with Mantovani & His Orchestra	8	4 March 1955	1
4 March 1955	5	"Let Me Go, Lover!"	Dean Martin	3	25 March 1955	1
11 March 1955	5	"A Blossom Fell"	Nat King Cole	3	18 March 1955	1
11 March 1955	5	"Mobile"	Ray Burns	4	18 March 1955	1
18 March 1955	2	"Let Me Go, Lover!"	Ruby Murray	5	18 March 1955	1
25 March 1955	8	"(I'm Always Hearing) Wedding Bells"	Eddie Fisher	5	1 April 1955	1
25 March 1955	2	"Tomorrow"	Johnny Brandon & The Phantoms	8	25 March 1955	1
25 March 1955	1	"A Blossom Fell"	Dickie Valentine	9	25 March 1955	1
25 March 1955	7	"If Anyone Finds This, I Love You"	Ruby Murray & Anne Warren	4	8 April 1955	2
1 April 1955	14	"Cherry Pink (and Apple Blossom White)"	Pérez 'Prez' Prado & His Orchestra	1	29 April 1955	2
1 April 1955	3	"Prize of Gold"	Joan Regan	6	8 April 1955	1
8 April 1955	3	"Under the Bridges of Paris"	Dean Martin	6	15 April 1955	2
8 April 1955	1	"A Blossom Fell"	Ronnie Hilton	10	8 April 1955	1
15 April 1955	17	"Cherry Pink (and Apple Blossom White)"	Eddie Calvert	1	27 May 1955	4
15 April 1955	3	"Ready, Willing and Able" ^{[G]}	Doris Day	7	15 April 1955	1
15 April 1955	13	"Stranger in Paradise"	Tony Bennett	1	13 May 1955	2
22 April 1955	2	"Under the Bridges of Paris"	Eartha Kitt	7	22 April 1955	1
22 April 1955	14	"Earth Angel"	The Crew-Cuts	4	13 May 1955	3
29 April 1955	10	"Stranger in Paradise"	Tony Martin	6	29 April 1955	1
6 May 1955	1	"Melody of Love"	The Ink Spots	10	6 May 1955	1
13 May 1955	5	"If You Believe" ^{[H]}	Johnnie Ray	7	20 May 1955	2
20 May 1955	11	"Unchained Melody"	Al Hibbler	2	10 June 1955	4
27 May 1955	13	"Unchained Melody"	Jimmy Young	1	24 June 1955	3
27 May 1955	3	"Stranger in Paradise"	The Four Aces	6	3 June 1955	1
27 May 1955	2	"Unchained Melody" ^{[I]}	Les Baxter	10	27 May 1955	2
3 June 1955	13	"Dreamboat"	Alma Cogan	1	15 July 1955	2
17 June 1955	6	"Where Will the Dimple Be?"	Rosemary Clooney & The Mellomen	6	24 June 1955	1
1 July 1955	8	"I Wonder"	Dickie Valentine	4	15 July 1955	1
8 July 1955	13	"Evermore"	Ruby Murray	3	22 July 1955	3
8 July 1955	17	"Cool Water"	Frankie Laine with The Mellomen	2	5 August 1955	5
15 July 1955	17	"Rose Marie" (#1) ^{[D]}	Slim Whitman	1	29 July 1955	11
29 July 1955	8	"Ev'ry Day of My Life"	Malcolm Vaughan	5	2 September 1955	1
29 July 1955	16	"Ev'rywhere"	David Whitfield	3	23 September 1955	1
5 August 1955	9	"Strange Lady in Town"	Frankie Laine	6	12 August 1955	2
12 August 1955	10	"Learnin' the Blues"	Frank Sinatra	2	26 August 1955	5
26 August 1955	4	"Indian Love Call" ^{[J]}	Slim Whitman	7	26 August 1955	1
26 August 1955	9	"The Breeze and I"	Caterina Valente	5	9 September 1955	2
2 September 1955	3	"John and Julie"	Eddie Calvert	6	2 September 1955	2
9 September 1955	5	"Close the Door"	The Stargazers	6	30 September 1955	1
23 September 1955	11	"The Man from Laramie"	Jimmy Young	1	14 October 1955	4
23 September 1955	1	"Love Me or Leave Me"	Sammy Davis Jr.	8	23 September 1955	1
30 September 1955	8	"Blue Star" ^{[K]}	Cyril Stapleton Orchestra with Julie Dawn	2	21 October 1955	2
7 October 1955	12	"The Yellow Rose of Texas"	Mitch Miller	2	28 October 1955	1
14 October 1955	7	"Hey There"	Rosemary Clooney	4	18 November 1955	1
21 October 1955	20	"Rock Around the Clock" ^{[L]}	Bill Haley & His Comets	1	25 November 1955	5
21 October 1955	6	"Hey There"	Johnnie Ray	5	11 November 1955	2
21 October 1955	9	"Hernando's Hideaway"	The Johnston Brothers	1	11 November 1955	2
4 November 1955	3	"I'll Come When You Call"	Ruby Murray	6	11 November 1955	1
11 November 1955	9	"Let's Have a Ding Dong"	Winifred Atwell	3	2 December 1955	1
18 November 1955	1	"Song of the Dreamer"	Johnnie Ray	10	18 November 1955	1
25 November 1955	11	"Love Is a Many-Splendored Thing"	The Four Aces	2	25 November 1955	2
25 November 1955	4	"Ain't That a Shame"	Pat Boone	7	9 December 1955	1
25 November 1955	8	"Twenty Tiny Fingers" ♦	The Stargazers	4	6 January 1956	1
2 December 1955	6	"Christmas Alphabet"	Dickie Valentine	1	16 December 1955	3
2 December 1955	8	"Meet Me on the Corner" ♦	Max Bygraves	2	6 January 1956	1
9 December 1955	5	"Suddenly There's a Valley" ♦ ^{[M]}	Petula Clark	7	6 January 1956	1
16 December 1955	2	"When You Lose the One You Love"	David Whitfield with Mantovani & His Orchestra	7	16 December 1955	1
23 December 1955	3	"Hawkeye"	Frankie Laine	7	23 December 1955	2
30 December 1955	1	"Join In and Sing Again"	The Johnston Brothers & The George Chisholm Sour-Note Six	9	30 December 1955	1
30 December 1955	3	"Never Do a Tango with an Eskimo" ♦	Alma Cogan	6	6 January 1956	2

== Entries by artist ==
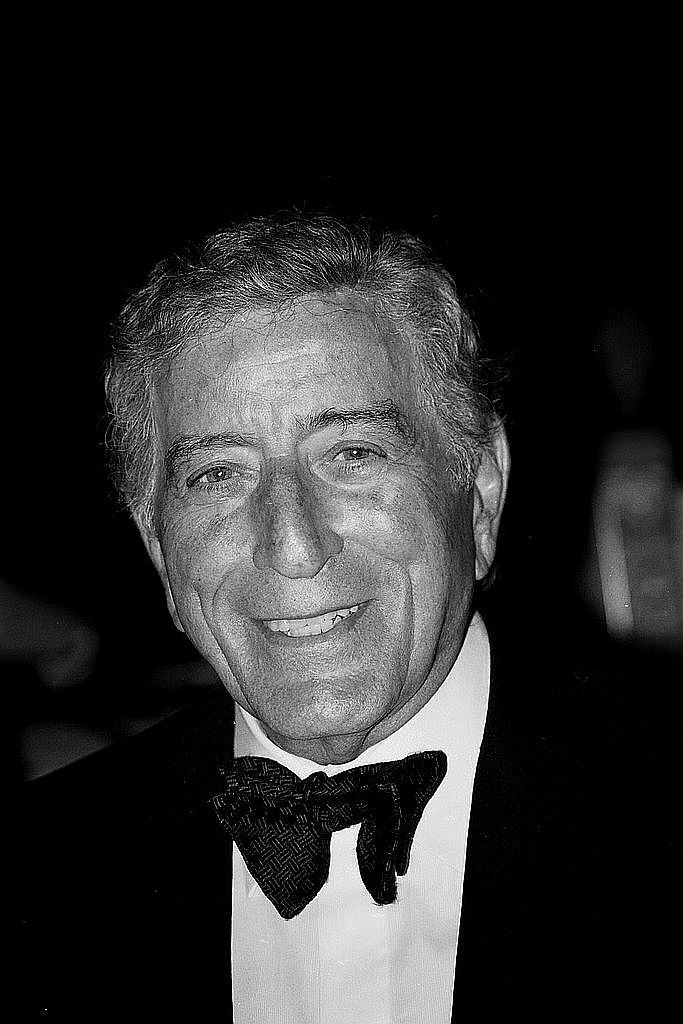
Tony Bennett (pictured in 1995) scored his first and only UK top 10 single this year with his version of "Stranger in Paradise", which spent two weeks at number-one in May. Two other versions of the song by Tony Martin and The Four Aces made the top 10, both peaking at number six.

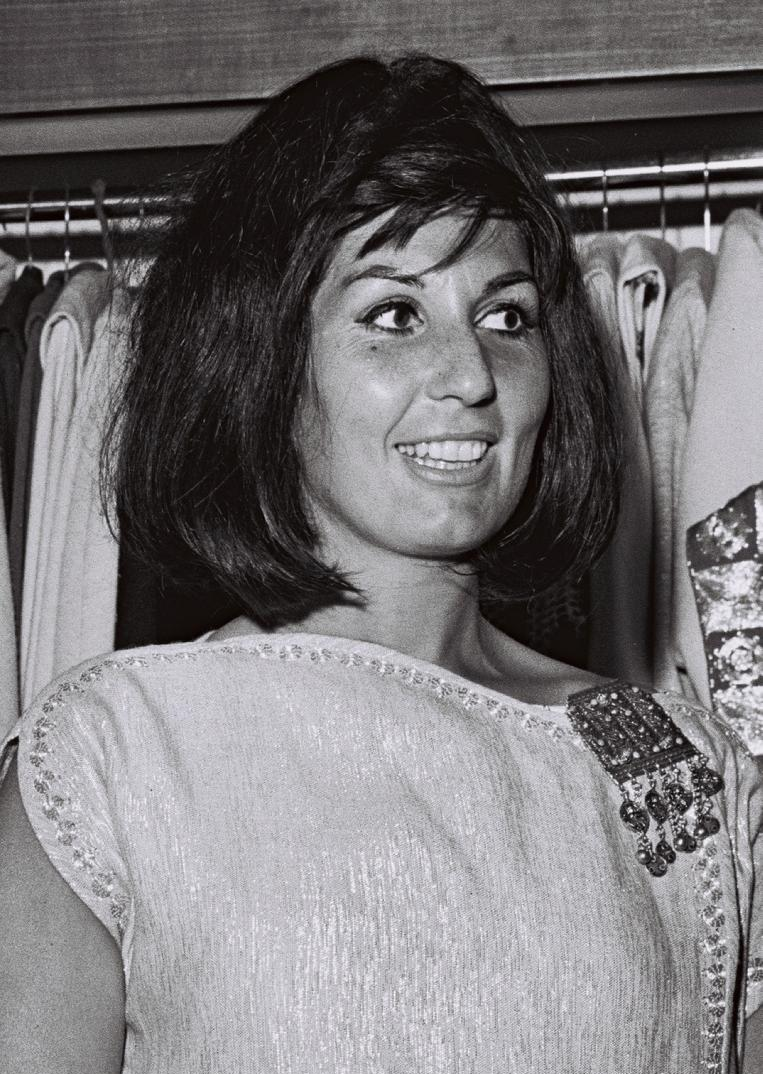
Alma Cogan (pictured in 1963) had three songs in the UK top 10 in 1955, including her biggest hit and only number-one single, "Dreamboat", which spent two weeks at the top of the charts in July.

The following table shows artists who achieved two or more top 10 entries in 1955, including singles that reached their peak in 1954 or 1956. The figures include both main artists and featured artists. The total number of weeks an artist spent in the top ten in 1955 is also shown.

Entries	Artist	Weeks	Singles
7	Ruby Murray ^{[N]}	56	"Evermore", "Happy Days and Lonely Nights", "Heartbeat", "If Anyone Finds This, I Love You", "I'll Come When You Call", "Let Me Go, Lover!", "Softly, Softly"
5	Dickie Valentine ^{[N]}	31	"A Blossom Fell", "Christmas Alphabet", "The Finger of Suspicion", "I Wonder", "Mr. Sandman"
4	David Whitfield ^{[O]}	22	"Beyond the Stars", "Ev'rywhere", "Santo Natale (Merry Christmas)", "When You Lose the One You Love"
4	Frankie Laine ^{[O]}	31	"Cool Water", "Hawkeye", "Rain Rain Rain", "Strange Lady in Town"
4	Rosemary Clooney ^{[O]}	29	"Hey There", "Mambo Italiano", "This Ole House", "Where Will The Dimple Be?"
3	Alma Cogan	16	"Dreamboat", "I Can't Tell a Waltz from a Tango", "Never Do a Tango with an Eskimo"
3	Dean Martin	14	"Let Me Go, Lover!", "The Naughty Lady of Shady Lane", "Under the Bridges of Paris"
3	The Four Aces	9	"Love Is a Many-Splendored Thing", "Mr. Sandman", "Stranger in Paradise"
3	Johnnie Ray	12	"Hey There," "If You Believe", "Song of the Dreamer"
3	The Mellomen	34	"Cool Water", "Mambo Italiano", "Where Will the Dimple Be?"
3	The Stargazers ^{[P]}	22	"Close the Door", "The Finger of Suspicion", "Twenty Tiny Fingers"
2	Bill Haley & His Comets	18	"Rock Around the Clock", "Shake, Rattle and Roll"
2	Eddie Calvert	20	"Cherry Pink (and Apple Blossom White)", "John and Julie"
2	Jimmy Young	24	"The Man from Laramie", "Unchained Melody"
2	Mantovani	4	"Beyond the Stars", "When You Lose the One You Love"
2	Ronnie Hilton ^{[O]}	6	"A Blossom Fell", "I Still Believe"
2	Slim Whitman	21	"Indian Love Call", "Rose Marie"
2	Winifred Atwell ^{[O]}	9	"Let's Have Another Party", "Let's Have a Ding Dong"

== Notes ==
- ^{a} "Hold My Hand" re-entered the top 10 at number 7 on 13 January 1955 (week ending).
- ^{b} "This Ole House" re-entered the top 10 at number 5 on 4 November 1954 (week ending) for 10 weeks and at number 10 on 20 January 1955 (week ending) for 2 weeks.
- ^{c} "Rain Rain Rain" re-entered the top 10 at number 9 on 16 December 1954 (week ending) for 4 weeks and at number 8 on 27 January 1955 (week ending).
- ^{d} "Give Me Your Word" is recorded as the best-selling single of the year by some sources but the Official Charts Company lists "Rose Marie" as its best-seller.
- ^{e} "The Naughty Lady of Shady Lane" (Dean Martin version) re-entered the top 10 at number 7 on 24 March 1955 (week ending).
- ^{f} "Let Me Go Lover" (Teresa Brewer with The Lancers version) re-entered the top 10 at number 10 on 24 March 1955 (week ending).
- ^{g} "Ready, Willing and Able" re-entered the top 10 at number 9 on 21 April 1955 (week ending) for 2 weeks.
- ^{h} "If You Believe" re-entered the top 10 at number 8 on 9 June 1955 (week ending) for 3 weeks.
- ^{i} "Unchained Melody" (Les Baxter version) re-entered the top 10 at number 10 on 30 June 1955 (week ending).
- ^{j} "Indian Love Call" re-entered the top 10 at number 10 on 13 October 1955 (week ending).
- ^{k} "Blue Star" was used as the theme music to the television series Medic.
- ^{l} "Rock Around the Clock" re-entered the top 10 at number 8 on 18 October 1956 (week ending) for 5 weeks.
- ^{m} "Suddenly There's a Valley" re-entered the top 10 at number 9 on 29 December 1955 (week ending) for 4 weeks.
- ^{n} Figures includes single that first charted in 1954 but peaked in 1955.
- ^{o} Figure includes single that peaked in 1954.
- ^{p} Figure includes single that peaked in 1956.

== See also ==
- 1955 in British music
- List of number-one singles from the 1950s (UK)
