= List of UK singles chart number ones of the 1950s =

The UK singles chart is the official record chart in the United Kingdom. Record charts in the UK began life in 1952 when Percy Dickins from New Musical Express (NME) imitated an idea started in American Billboard magazine and began compiling a hit parade. Prior to this, a song's popularity was measured by the sales of sheet music. Initially, Dickins telephoned a sample of around 20 shops asking for a list of the 10 best-selling songs. These results were then aggregated to give a Top 12 chart published in NME on 14 November 1952. The number-one single was "Here in My Heart" by Al Martino.

According to The Official Charts Company and Guinness' British Hit Singles & Albums, the NME is considered the official British singles chart before 10 March 1960. However, until 15 February 1969, when the British Market Research Bureau chart was established, there was no universally accepted chart. Other charts existed and different artists may have placed at number one in charts by Record Mirror, Disc or Melody Maker. Alternatively, some considered the BBC's Pick of the Pops, which averaged all these charts, to be a better indicator of the number-one single.

In terms of number-one singles, Frankie Laine, Guy Mitchell and Elvis Presley were the most successful artists of the 1950s, having four singles reach the top spot. (Note: Although The Official Charts Company does not credit Paul Weston as an artist on the singles, he was also a contributing artist to four number-one singles in the 1950s.) The longest duration of a single at number one was eighteen weeks, achieved by Frankie Laine's "I Believe". "I Believe" still holds the record for the most non-consecutive weeks at the top of the UK Singles Chart. It is believed that the three best-selling records of the decade – Bill Haley & His Comets' "Rock Around the Clock", Paul Anka's "Diana" and Harry Belafonte's "Mary's Boy Child" – all sold over one million copies.

== Number-one singles ==
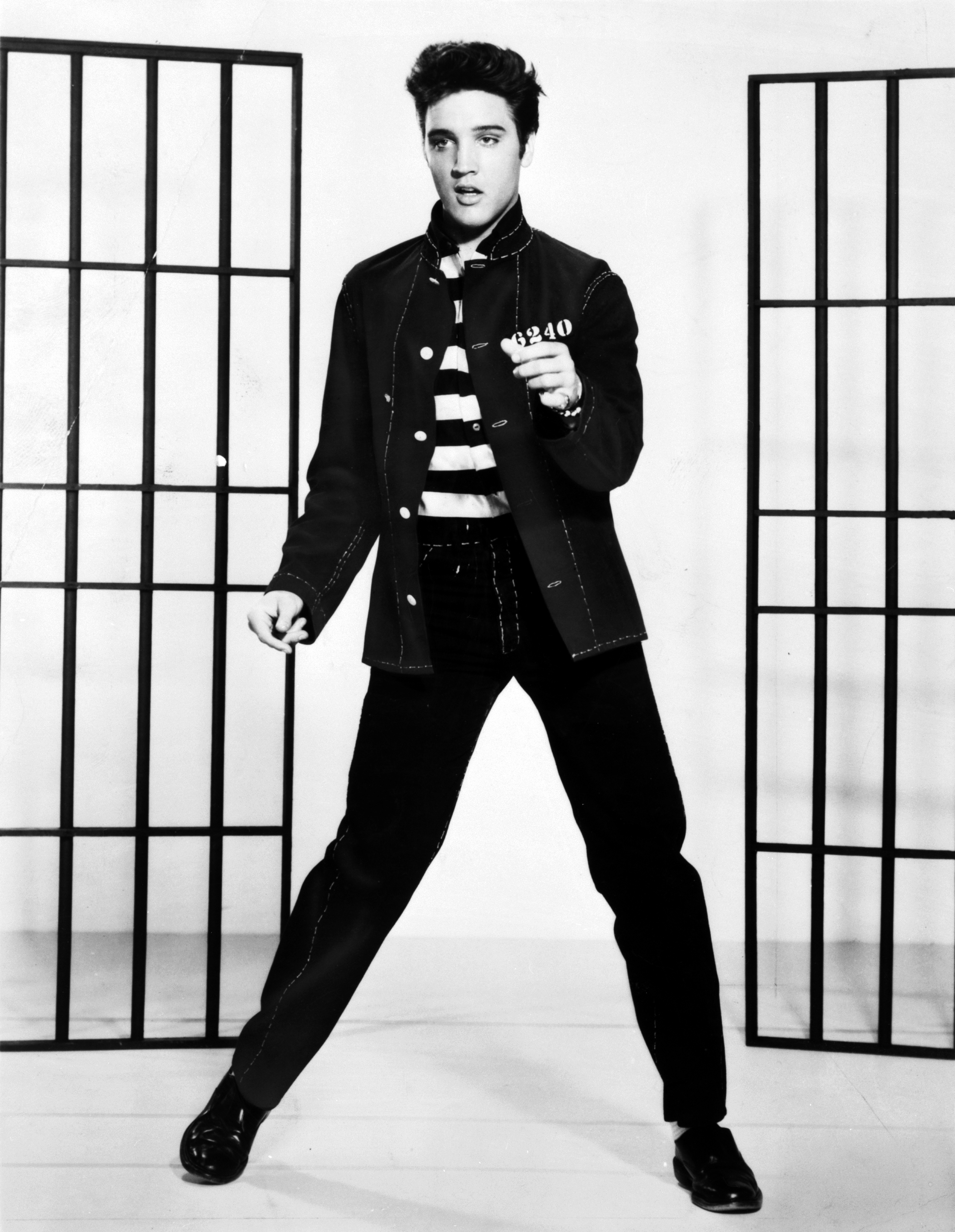
Elvis Presley in a publicity photo for "Jailhouse Rock" which was the best-selling single of 1958. Presley had three other number ones in the 1950s.

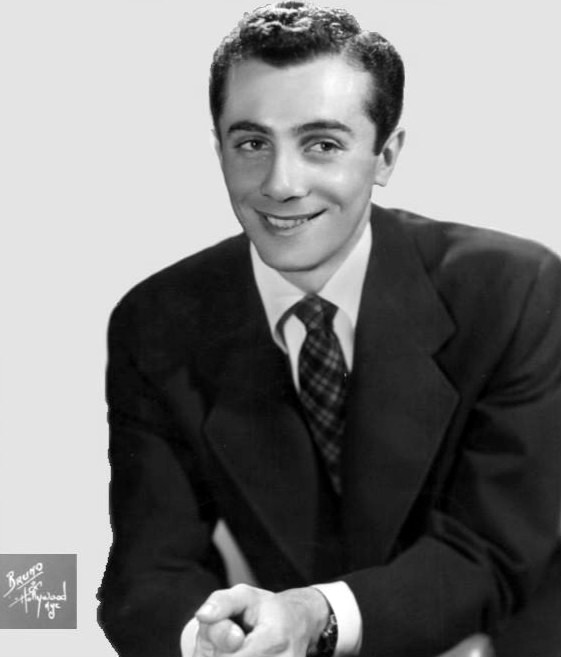
Al Martino's "Here in My Heart" was the first ever number-one single and held the top spot for nine weeks.

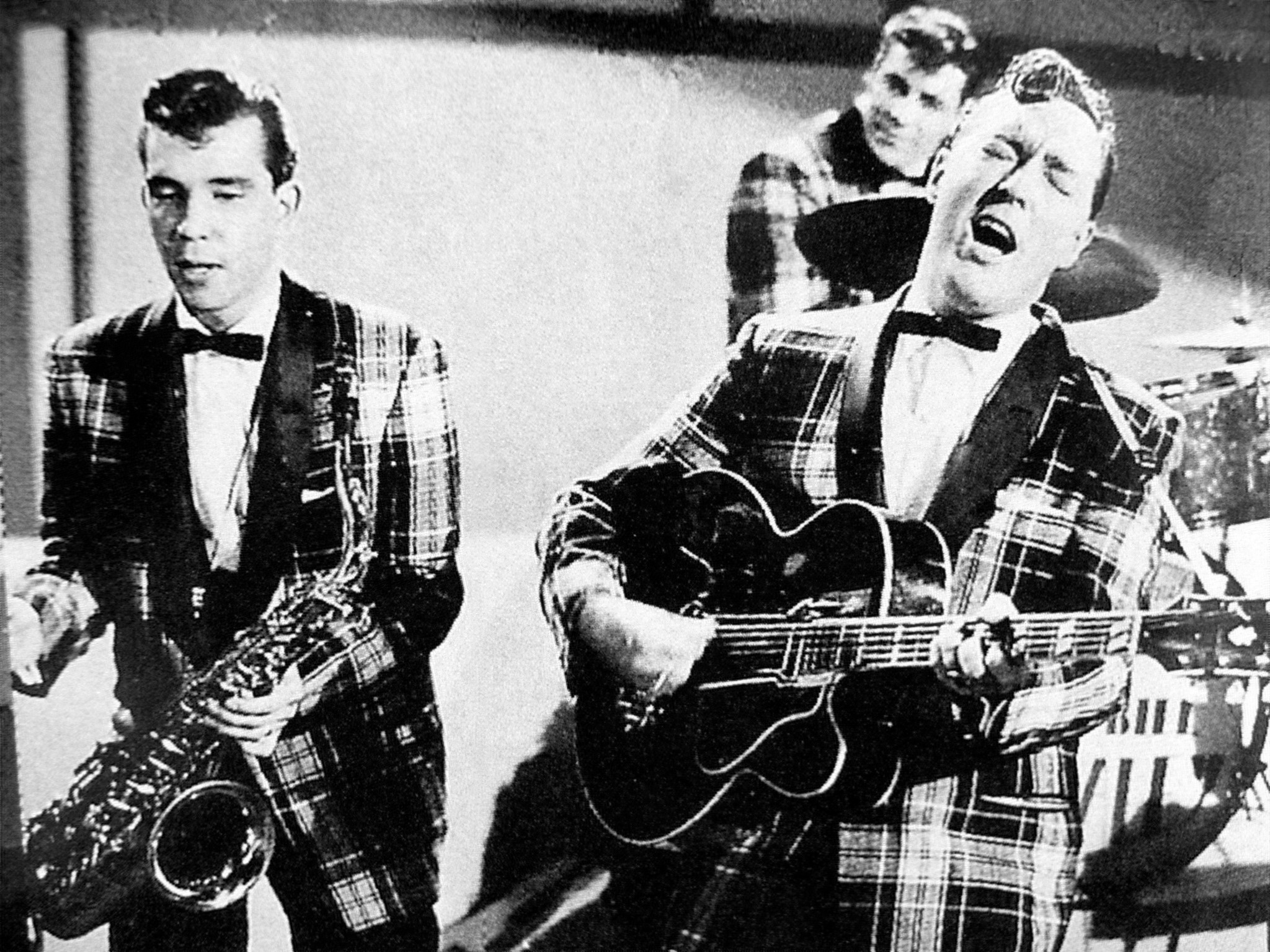
Bill Haley & His Comets had the biggest-selling single of the decade with "Rock Around the Clock".

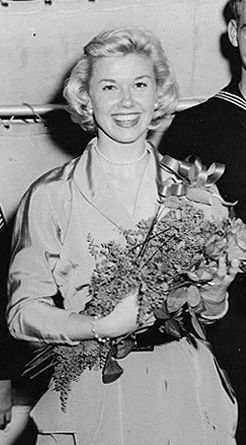
Doris Day had two number-one singles in the 1950s, one of which, "Secret Love", was the best-selling record of 1954.

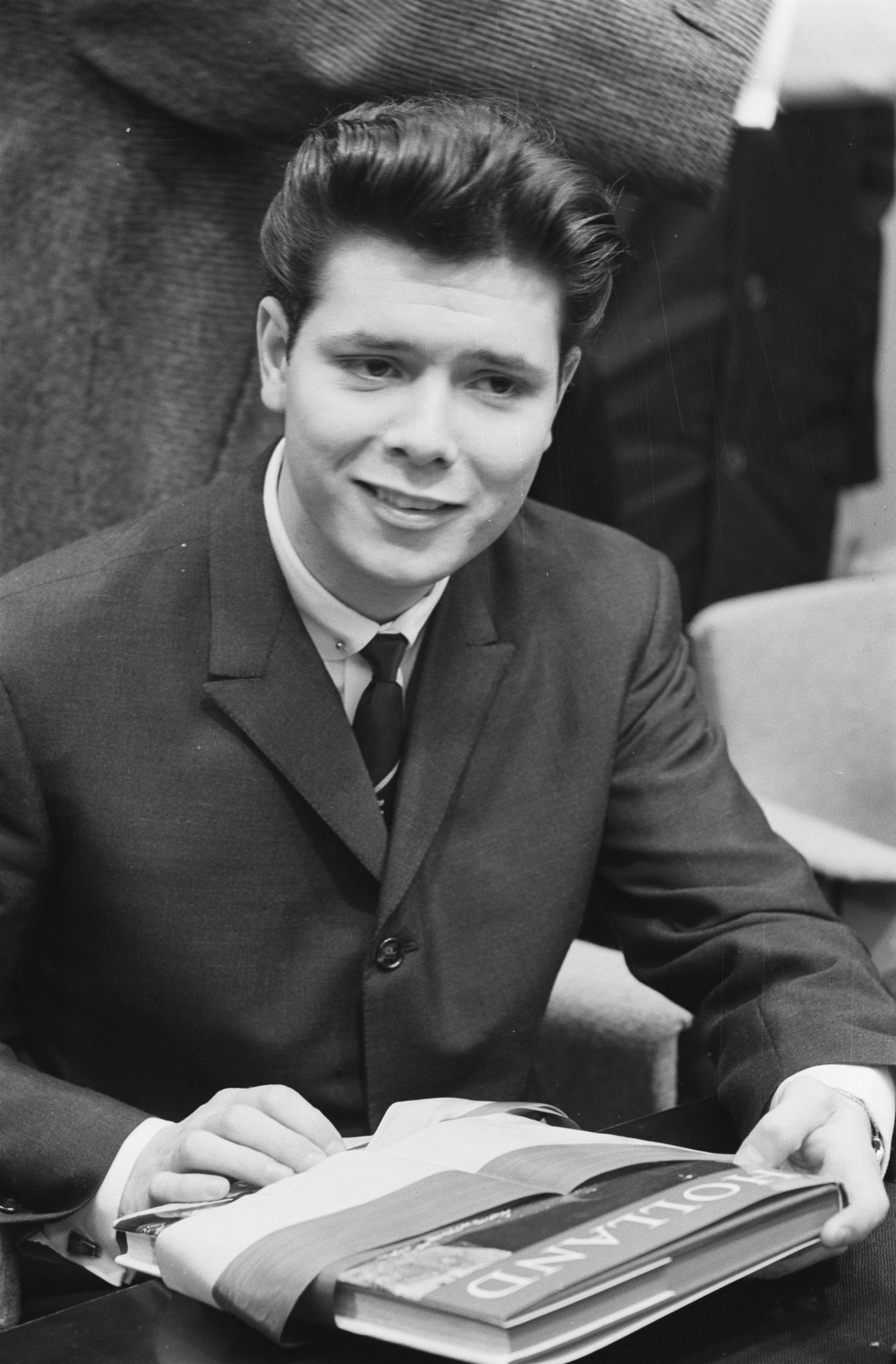
Cliff Richard achieved his first two number-one singles in the latter half of 1959.

Key
†	Best-selling single of the year
‡	Best-selling single of the decade
[nb #]	The song spent a week at number one where it shared the top spot with another song.

Chart history
No.	Artist (Note: The artist, song name, date of number-one and its consecutive duration are those given by The Official Charts Company.)	Single	Record label (Note: The record labels are those given by the OCC.)	Week starting date (Note: There are discrepancies in when a single reached number one prior to 30 August 1969. As of 2010 the Official Chart Company website lists all weeks as ending on the Saturday back until 20 March 1960. However, the old Official Chart Company lists chart weeks prior to 5 February 1960 as ending on a Friday.)	Weeks at number one
1952
1	Al Martino	"Here in My Heart"	Capitol	14 November 1952	9
1953
2	Jo Stafford	"You Belong to Me"	Columbia	16 January 1953	1
3	Kay Starr	"Comes A-Long A-Love"	Capitol	23 January 1953	1
4	Eddie Fisher	"Outside of Heaven"	His Master's Voice	30 January 1953	1
5	Perry Como	"Don't Let the Stars Get in Your Eyes"	His Master's Voice	6 February 1953	5
6	Guy Mitchell	"She Wears Red Feathers"	Columbia	13 March 1953	4
7	The Stargazers	"Broken Wings"	Decca	10 April 1953	1
8	Lita Roza	"(How Much Is) That Doggie in the Window?"	Decca	17 April 1953	1
9	Frankie Laine	"I Believe" †	Philips	24 April 1953	9
10	Eddie Fisher with Sally Sweetland	"I'm Walking Behind You"	His Master's Voice	26 June 1953	1
re	Frankie Laine	"I Believe" †	Philips	3 July 1953	6
11	Mantovani	"The Song from Moulin Rouge"	Decca	14 August 1953	1
re	Frankie Laine	"I Believe" †	Philips	21 August 1953	3
12	Guy Mitchell	"Look at That Girl"	Philips	11 September 1953	6
13	Frankie Laine	"Hey Joe"	Philips	23 October 1953	2
14	David Whitfield	"Answer Me"	Decca	6 November 1953	1
15	Frankie Laine	"Answer Me"	Philips	13 November 1953	8 (Note: Both Frankie Laine's and David Whitfield's version of "Answer Me" were classified jointly as number one on 11 December 1953. In the week before and the week after Laine's version took the number-one spot outright.)
re	David Whitfield	"Answer Me"	Decca	11 December 1953	1
1954
16	Eddie Calvert	"Oh Mein Papa"	Columbia	8 January 1954	9
17	The Stargazers	"I See the Moon"	Decca	12 March 1954	5
18	Doris Day	"Secret Love" †	Philips	16 April 1954	1
re	The Stargazers	"I See the Moon"	Decca	23 April 1954	1
19	Johnnie Ray	"Such a Night"	Philips	30 April 1954	1
re	Doris Day	"Secret Love" †	Philips	7 May 1954	8
20	David Whitfield with Mantovani and his Orchestra	"Cara Mia"	Decca	2 July 1954	10
21	Kitty Kallen	"Little Things Mean a Lot"	Brunswick	10 September 1954	1
22	Frank Sinatra	"Three Coins in the Fountain"	Capitol	17 September 1954	3
23	Don Cornell	"Hold My Hand"	Vogue	8 October 1954	4
24	Vera Lynn	"My Son, My Son"	Decca	5 November 1954	2
re	Don Cornell	"Hold My Hand"	Vogue	19 November 1954	1
25	Rosemary Clooney	"This Ole House"	Philips	26 November 1954	1
26	Winifred Atwell	"Let's Have Another Party"	Philips	3 December 1954	5
1955
27	Dickie Valentine with the Stargazers	"The Finger of Suspicion"	Decca	7 January 1955	1
28	Rosemary Clooney	"Mambo Italiano"	Philips	14 January 1955	1
re	Dickie Valentine with the Stargazers	"The Finger of Suspicion"	Decca	21 January 1955	2
re	Rosemary Clooney	"Mambo Italiano"	Philips	4 February 1955	2
29	Ruby Murray	"Softly, Softly"	Columbia	18 February 1955	3
30	Tennessee Ernie Ford	"Give Me Your Word"	Capitol	11 March 1955	7
31	Pérez Prado and his Orchestra	"Cherry Pink (and Apple Blossom White)"	His Master's Voice	29 April 1955	2
32	Tony Bennett	"Stranger in Paradise"	Philips	13 May 1955	2
33	Eddie Calvert	"Cherry Pink (and Apple Blossom White)"	Columbia	27 May 1955	4
34	Jimmy Young	"Unchained Melody"	Decca	24 June 1955	3
35	Alma Cogan	"Dreamboat"	His Master's Voice	15 July 1955	2
36	Slim Whitman	"Rose Marie" †	London	29 July 1955	11
37	Jimmy Young	"The Man from Laramie"	Decca	14 October 1955	4
38	The Johnston Brothers	"Hernando's Hideaway"	Decca	11 November 1955	2
39	Bill Haley & His Comets	"Rock Around the Clock" ‡	Brunswick	25 November 1955	3
40	Dickie Valentine	"Christmas Alphabet"	Decca	16 December 1955	3
1956
re	Bill Haley & His Comets	"Rock Around the Clock" ‡	Brunswick	6 January 1956	2
41	Tennessee Ernie Ford	"Sixteen Tons"	Capitol	20 January 1956	4
42	Dean Martin	"Memories Are Made of This"	Capitol	17 February 1956	4
43	The Dream Weavers	"It's Almost Tomorrow"	Brunswick	16 March 1956	2
44	Kay Starr	"Rock and Roll Waltz"	His Master's Voice	30 March 1956	1
re	The Dream Weavers	"It's Almost Tomorrow"	Brunswick	6 April 1956	1
45	Winifred Atwell	"The Poor People of Paris"	Decca	13 April 1956	3
46	Ronnie Hilton	"No Other Love"	His Master's Voice	4 May 1956	6
47	Pat Boone	"I'll Be Home" †	London	15 June 1956	5
48	The Teenagers featuring Frankie Lymon	"Why Do Fools Fall in Love"	Columbia	20 July 1956	3
49	Doris Day	"Whatever Will Be, Will Be (Que Sera, Sera)"	Philips	10 August 1956	6
50	Anne Shelton	"Lay Down Your Arms"	Philips	21 September 1956	4
51	Frankie Laine	"A Woman in Love"	Philips	19 October 1956	4
52	Johnnie Ray	"Just Walking in the Rain"	Philips	16 November 1956	7
1957
53	Guy Mitchell	"Singing the Blues"	Philips	4 January 1957	1
54	Tommy Steele	"Singing the Blues"	Decca	11 January 1957	1
re	Guy Mitchell	"Singing the Blues"	Philips	18 January 1957	1
55	Frankie Vaughan	"The Garden of Eden"	Philips	25 January 1957	4 (Note: Both Frankie Vaughan's "The Garden of Eden" and Guy Mitchell's "Singing the Blues" were classified jointly as number one on 1 February 1957. Vaughan held the number-one spot outright for the week before and the two weeks afterwards.)
re	Guy Mitchell	"Singing the Blues"	Philips	1 February 1957	1
56	Tab Hunter	"Young Love"	London	22 February 1957	7
57	Lonnie Donegan	"Cumberland Gap"	Pye Nixa	12 April 1957	5
58	Guy Mitchell	"Rock-a-Billy"	Philips	17 May 1957	1
59	Andy Williams	"Butterfly"	London	24 May 1957	2
60	Johnnie Ray	"Yes Tonight Josephine"	Philips	7 June 1957	3
61	Lonnie Donegan	"Gamblin' Man" / "Puttin' On the Style"	Pye Nixa	28 June 1957	2
62	Elvis Presley	"All Shook Up"	RCA	12 July 1957	7
63	Paul Anka	"Diana" †	Columbia	30 August 1957	9
64	The Crickets	"That'll Be the Day"	Vogue Coral	1 November 1957	3
65	Harry Belafonte	"Mary's Boy Child"	RCA	22 November 1957	7
1958
66	Jerry Lee Lewis	"Great Balls of Fire"	London	10 January 1958	2
67	Elvis Presley	"Jailhouse Rock" †	RCA	24 January 1958	3
68	Michael Holliday	"The Story of My Life"	Columbia	14 February 1958	2
69	Perry Como	"Magic Moments"	RCA	28 February 1958	8
70	Marvin Rainwater	"Whole Lotta Woman"	MGM	25 April 1958	3
71	Connie Francis	"Who's Sorry Now"	MGM	16 May 1958	6
72	Vic Damone	"On the Street Where You Live"	Philips	27 June 1958	2 (Note: Both Vic Damone's "On the Street Where You Live" and The Everly Brothers's "All I Have to Do Is Dream" were classified jointly as number one on 4 July 1958. For the following six weeks "All I Have to Do Is Dream" claimed the number-one spot outright.)
73	The Everly Brothers	"All I Have to Do Is Dream" / "Claudette"	London	4 July 1958	7
74	The Kalin Twins	"When"	Brunswick	22 August 1958	5
75	Connie Francis	"Stupid Cupid" / "Carolina Moon"	MGM	26 September 1958	6
76	Tommy Edwards	"It's All in the Game"	MGM	7 November 1958	3
77	Lord Rockingham's XI	"Hoots Mon"	Decca	28 November 1958	3
78	Conway Twitty	"It's Only Make Believe"	MGM	19 December 1958	5
1959
79	Jane Morgan	"The Day the Rains Came"	London	23 January 1959	1
80	Elvis Presley	"One Night" / "I Got Stung"	RCA	30 January 1959	3
81	Shirley Bassey	"As I Love You"	Philips	20 February 1959	4
82	The Platters	"Smoke Gets in Your Eyes"	Mercury	20 March 1959	1
83	Russ Conway	"Side Saddle"	Columbia	27 March 1959	4
84	Buddy Holly	"It Doesn't Matter Anymore"	Coral	24 April 1959	3
85	Elvis Presley	"A Fool Such as I" / "I Need Your Love Tonight"	RCA	15 May 1959	5
86	Russ Conway	"Roulette"	Columbia	19 June 1959	2
87	Bobby Darin	"Dream Lover"	London	3 July 1959	4
88	Cliff Richard and the Drifters	"Living Doll" †	Columbia	31 July 1959	6
89	Craig Douglas	"Only Sixteen"	Top Rank	11 September 1959	4
90	Jerry Keller	"Here Comes Summer"	London	9 October 1959	1
91	Bobby Darin	"Mack the Knife"	London	16 October 1959	2
92	Cliff Richard and the Shadows	"Travellin' Light"	Columbia	30 October 1959	5
93	Adam Faith	"What Do You Want?"	Parlophone	4 December 1959	3 (Note: Both Adam Faith's "What Do You Want?" and Emile Ford and the Checkmates' "What Do You Want to Make Those Eyes at Me For?" were classified jointly as number one on 18 December 1959. For the following five weeks "What Do You Want to Make Those Eyes at Me For?" claimed the number-one spot outright.)
94	Emile Ford and the Checkmates	"What Do You Want to Make Those Eyes at Me For?"	Pye	18 December 1959	6

== By artist ==
The following artists achieved three or more number-one hits during the 1950s. Artists Frankie Laine, Guy Mitchell and Elvis Presley were the most successful acts of the decade in terms of number-one singles, each having four singles reach the top of the chart. In total, Laine spent 32 weeks occupying the top of chart in the 1950s; the next highest was Presley who spent a total of 18 weeks at number one.

Artists who got 3 or more number ones during the 1950s
Artist	Number ones	Weeks at number one
Frankie Laine	4	32
Elvis Presley	4	18
Guy Mitchell	4	14
Johnnie Ray	3	11
The Stargazers	3	10

== By record label ==
The following record labels had five or more number ones on the UK Singles Chart during the 1950s.

Record labels who had five or more number ones during the 1950s
Record label	Number ones
Philips	20
Decca	15
Columbia	12
London	10
His Master's Voice	7
Capitol	6
RCA	6
MGM	5
