= List of Record Mirror number-one singles =

A copy of the Record Mirror's first ever chart, released on 22 January 1955

The Record Mirror is a former British weekly pop music newspaper. From 1955 until 1962, the Record Mirror compiled its own record chart which was used by many national newspapers. It formed as a rival to the existing chart published by NME. The Mirror's chart was based on the postal returns from record stores that were financed by the newspaper, whereas the rival chart in the NME was based on a telephone poll. On 22 January 1955, the Mirror published its first chart, compiled using figures from 24 shops. The first chart-topper was "Mambo Italiano" by Rosemary Clooney, with the newspaper having compiled a Top Ten. The chart was expanded from a Top Ten to a Top Twenty on 8 October 1955. In the early 1960s some national newspapers switched to using a chart compiled by Melody Maker and, ultimately, the cost of collecting sales figures by post led to the chart's demise. On 24 March 1962, the paper stopped compiling its own chart and started publishing Record Retailer's Top 50.

Record charts in the United Kingdom began life on 14 November 1952 when NME imitated an idea started in American Billboard magazine and began compiling a hit parade. Prior to 15 February 1969, when the British Market Research Bureau chart was established, there had been no universally accepted chart. During this time the BBC used aggregated results of charts from the Mirror and other sources to compile the Pick of the Pops chart. However, according to The Official Charts Company and Guinness' British Hit Singles & Albums, the NME is considered the official British singles chart before 10 March 1960. After that date and until 1969 a chart compiled by Record Retailer is considered the official British singles chart.

Dean Martin's song "Naughty Lady of Shady Lane" was the first to have a number-one in the Record Mirror chart but not to be awarded the top spot in NME's chart. There are five more songs that, like Martin's, reached number-one on the Record Mirror chart but are not classified as number-one by the UK Singles Chart. Additionally, the Record Mirror and other charts differed about what they classified as the top song of the year. Record Mirror classified The Everly Brothers' "All I Have to Do Is Dream"/"Claudette" as the top single of 1958 while the UK Singles Chart best-selling single of that year was Elvis Presley's "Jailhouse Rock". Furthermore, despite never reaching number-one, Pat Boone's "Love Letters in the Sand" was classified by Record Mirror as the best-selling song of 1957; the song entered the chart at number eleven on 13 July and, later, charted in the top three positions for 9 consecutive weeks.

== Number-one singles ==
Key
*	The song did not reach number on the NME (1952–1960) or Record Retailer (1960–1969) charts which are considered by The Official Charts Company as the canonical sources.
†	The song spent a week at number one where it shared the top spot with another song.

No.	Artist (Note: The names, singles, dates and duration of the number-ones are from the Record Mirror.)	Single	Reached number one	Weeks at number one
1955
1	Rosemary Clooney	"Mambo Italiano"	22 January 1955	3
2	Dean Martin	"Naughty Lady of Shady Lane"*	12 February 1955	1
3	Tennessee Ernie Ford	"Give Me Your Word"	19 February 1955	3
4	Ruby Murray	"Softly, Softly"	12 March 1955	1
re	Tennessee Ernie Ford	"Give Me Your Word"	19 March 1955	6
5	Tony Bennett	"Stranger in Paradise"	7 May 1955	6
6	Al Hibbler	"Unchained Melody"*	11 June 1955	4
7	Alma Cogan	"Dreamboat"	9 July 1955	2
8	Slim Whitman	"Rose Marie"	23 July 1955	9
9	Frankie Laine	"Cool Water"*	1 October 1955	1
10	Jimmy Young	"The Man from Laramie"	8 October 1955	5
11	Bill Haley	"Rock Around the Clock"	12 November 1955	8
1956
12	Tennessee Ernie Ford	"Sixteen Tons"	14 January 1956	5
13	Lou Busch	"Zambesi"*	18 February 1956	2
14	Dean Martin	"Memories Are Made of This"	3 March 1956	2
15	The Dream Weavers	"It's Almost Tomorrow"	17 March 1956	3
16	Winifred Atwell	"The Poor People of Paris"	7 April 1956	5
17	Ronnie Hilton	"No Other Love"	12 May 1956	4
18	Pat Boone	"I'll Be Home"	9 June 1956	6
19	Frankie Lymon and The Teenagers	"Why Do Fools Fall in Love"	21 July 1956	3
20	Doris Day	"Whatever Will Be, Will Be"	11 August 1956	6
21	Anne Shelton	"Lay Down Your Arms"	22 September 1956	4
22	Frankie Laine	"Woman In Love"	20 October 1956	3
23	Johnnie Ray	"Just Walking in the Rain"	10 November 1956	7
1957
24	Guy Mitchell	"Singing the Blues"	5 January 1957	2
25	Tommy Steele	"Singing the Blues"	19 January 1957	1
re	Guy Mitchell	"Singing the Blues"	26 January 1957	1
26	Frankie Vaughan	"The Garden of Eden"	2 February 1957	3
27	Tab Hunter	"Young Love"	23 February 1957	7
28	Lonnie Donegan	"Cumberland Gap"	13 April 1957	4
29	Andy Williams	"Butterfly"	11 May 1957	5
30	Johnnie Ray	"Yes Tonight Josephine"	8 June 1957	4
31	Lonnie Donegan	"Gamblin' Man"	6 July 1957	1
32	Elvis Presley	"All Shook Up"	13 July 1957	7
33	Paul Anka	"Diana"	31 August 1957	8
34	The Crickets	"That'll Be the Day"	26 October 1957	4
35	Harry Belafonte	"Mary's Boy Child"	23 November 1957	5
1958
36	Johnny Otis Show	"Ma He's Making Eyes at Me"*	4 January 1958	2
37	Jerry Lee Lewis	"Great Balls of Fire"	18 January 1958	1
38	Elvis Presley	"Jailhouse Rock"	25 January 1958	3
39	Michael Holliday	"The Story of My Life"	15 February 1958	2
40	Perry Como	"Magic Moments" / "Catch a Falling Star"	1 March 1958	7
41	Marvin Rainwater	"Whole Lotta Woman"	19 April 1958	4
42	Connie Francis	"Who's Sorry Now"	17 May 1958	6
43	The Everly Brothers	"All I Have to Do Is Dream" / "Claudette"	28 June 1958	9
44	The Kalin Twins	"When"	30 August 1958	5
45	Connie Francis	"Carolina Moon" / "Stupid Cupid"	4 October 1958	5
46	The Everly Brothers	"Bird Dog"*	8 November 1958	3
47	Lord Rockingham's XI	"Hoots Mon"	29 November 1958	4
48	Conway Twitty	"It's Only Make Believe"	27 December 1958	4
1959
49	Elvis Presley	"One Night" / "I Got Stung"	24 January 1959	5
50	The Platters	"Smoke Gets in Your Eyes"	28 February 1959	5
51	Russ Conway	"Side Saddle"	4 April 1959	2
52	Buddy Holly	"It Doesn't Matter Anymore"	18 April 1959	2
53	Elvis Presley	"A Fool Such As I" / "I Need Your Love Tonight"	2 May 1959	7
54	Russ Conway	"Roulette"	20 June 1959	1
55	Bobby Darin	"Dream Lover"	27 June 1959	5 (Note: Due to a newspaper strike, Record Mirror was not published from 27 June to 8 August 1959; however, the chart details were released retrospectively.)
56	Cliff Richard	"Living Doll"	1 August 1959	4
57	Craig Douglas	"Only Sixteen"	29 August 1959	7
58	Cliff Richard	"Travellin' Light"	17 October 1959	7
59	Adam Faith	"What Do You Want?"	5 December 1959	5
1960
60	Emile Ford	"What Do You Want to Make Those Eyes at Me For?"	9 January 1960	2
61	Anthony Newley	"Why"	23 January 1960	6
62	Adam Faith	"Poor Me"	5 March 1960	1
63	Johnny Preston	"Running Bear"	12 March 1960	2
64	Lonnie Donegan	"My Old Man's a Dustman"	26 March 1960	5
65	The Everly Brothers	"Cathy's Clown"	30 April 1960	9
66	Jimmy Jones	"Good Timin'"	2 July 1960	4
67	Cliff Richard	"Please Don't Tease"	30 July 1960	3
68	The Shadows	"Apache"	20 August 1960	6
69	Ricky Valance	"Tell Laura I Love Her"	1 October 1960	2
70	Roy Orbison	"Only the Lonely"	15 October 1960	3
71	Elvis Presley	"It's Now or Never"	5 November 1960	9 (Note: This includes the week of 24 December 1960 when no Record Mirror was published.)
1961
72	Johnny Tillotson	"Poetry in Motion"	7 January 1961	3
73	Elvis Presley	"Are You Lonesome Tonight?"	28 January 1961	4
74	The Everly Brothers	"Walk Right Back"	25 February 1961	4
75	Elvis Presley	"Wooden Heart"	25 March 1961	3
76	The Allisons	"Are You Sure?"*	15 April 1961	2
re	Elvis Presley	"Wooden Heart"	29 April 1961	1 † (Note: Elvis Presley's "Wooden Heart" and The Temperance Seven's "You're Driving Me Crazy" were classified jointly as number one on 29 April 1961. The following week "You're Driving Me Crazy" claimed the number-one spot outright.)
77	The Temperance Seven	"You're Driving Me Crazy"	29 April 1961	2 †
78	The Marcels	"Blue Moon"	13 May 1961	2
79	Del Shannon	"Runaway"	27 May 1961	1 † (Note: Elvis Presley's "Surrender" and Del Shannon's "Runaway" were classified jointly as number one on 27 May 1961. The following week "Surrender" claimed the number-one spot outright.)
80	Elvis Presley	"Surrender"	27 May 1961	5 †
re	Del Shannon	"Runaway"	1 July 1961	1
81	The Everly Brothers	"Temptation"	8 July 1961	4
82	Eden Kane	"Well I Ask You"	5 August 1961	1
83	Helen Shapiro	"You Don't Know"	12 August 1961	2
84	John Leyton	"Johnny Remember Me"	26 August 1961	5
85	The Shadows	"Kon-Tiki"	30 September 1961	1
86	The Highwaymen	"Michael Row the Boat"	7 October 1961	1
87	Helen Shapiro	"Walkin' Back to Happiness"	14 October 1961	4
88	Elvis Presley	"His Latest Flame"	11 November 1961	3
89	Bobby Vee	"Take Good Care of My Baby"*	2 December 1961	1
90	Frankie Vaughan	"Tower of Strength"	9 December 1961	4
1962
91	Acker Bilk	"Stranger on the Shore"*	6 January 1962	1
92	Cliff Richard	"The Young Ones"	20 January 1962	5
93	Elvis Presley	"Rock-A-Hula Baby" / "Can't Help Falling in Love"	24 February 1962	4
