= Paddy Roberts (songwriter) =

South African songwriter (1910–1975)

John Godfrey Owen "Paddy" Roberts (18 January 1910 – 24 August 1975) was a British songwriter and singer who lived in Devon, England having previously been a lawyer and a pilot (serving with the RAF in World War II). He then joined BOAC and flew Lockheed Constellations for that airline in the late 1940s/1950s.

Roberts, who was born in Durban, Colony of Natal (in modern day South Africa), enjoyed success with a number of songs in the 1950s and 1960s and wrote songs for several films. He released several LPs and EPs of his own material, often featuring what were, for the time, slightly risqué lyrics. One of his most popular and amusing compositions that he recorded himself was titled "The Ballad of Bethnal Green", which was also recorded by Beatrice Lillie.

Roberts was five times the winner of an Ivor Novello Award, four for songwriting and one for services to the British Music Industry. He co-wrote the 1955 UK chart-topper, "Softly, Softly", as sung by Ruby Murray, and "Lay Down Your Arms" by Anne Shelton, which reached No. 1 in the UK Singles Chart in 1956.

Roberts died in August 1975 in Dartmouth, Devon, England.

== Discography ==
=== Songs ===
- "L'Anglais Avec Son Sang-froid"
- "Follow Me"
- "Love Isn't What it Used To Be"
- "The Book" (David Whitfield)
- "Lay Down Your Arms" (Anne Shelton) (1956)
- "Meet Me on the Corner" (Max Bygraves)
- "Pickin' a Chicken" (Eve Boswell)
- "Evermore" (Ruby Murray)
- "Softly, Softly" (Ruby Murray) (1955)
- "Johnny Is the Boy for Me"
- "It's a Boy" (Lita Roza)
- "That Dear Old Gentleman"
- "Send For Me"
- "The Three Galleons"
- "Merry Christmas You Suckers" (released in the US as "And A Happy New Year")
- "The Belle of Barking Creek"
- "The Big Dee Jay"
- "The Lavender Cowboy"
- "The Ballad of Bethnal Green" – Ivor Novello Awards winner (1959)
- "Tattooed Lady"
- "What's All This Fuss About Love"
- "I Remember Tilly"
- "Our Little Village"
- "Auntie Bridget"
- "I Love Mary"
- "Country Girl"

=== Soundtrack songs ===
- "Magic Carpet" (from "No Time for Tears")
- "You Are My First Love" (from It's Great to Be Young)
- "I'm in Love for the Very First Time" (from An Alligator Named Daisy) – Ivor Novello Award winner (1955)
- "The Heart of a Man" (from The Heart of a Man) (Frankie Vaughan)
- "Play Rough" (from Violent Playground)
- Several songs from The Good Companions (1957)
- "Give Me a Man" (from To Dorothy a Son)

=== Albums ===
- Strictly for Grown Ups (1959) – No. 8 UK Decca LF 1322
- Paddy Roberts Tries Again (1960) – No. 16 UK Decca LK 4358/SKL 4104
- Paddy Roberts at the Blue Angel (1961) Decca LK 4410
- Songs for Gay Dogs (1963) Decca LK 4560
- ...But Not in Front of the Children (1966) Decca LK 4774
- Funny World (1967) Decca LK4964/SKL 4964
- Doctor Dolittle – With Marty Wilde and others (1967) Marble Arch MAL 738
- The Best of Paddy Roberts (1968) – Re-recordings MFP 1276
- The World of Paddy Roberts (1969) – Compilation Decca PA 37/SPA 37

=== EPs and singles ===
Singles: featuring recordings not issued on albums

- "Love Is A Wonderful Thing" / "Send For Me" Decca F11446
- "Merry Christmas You Suckers" / "Got'N Idea" Decca F11552

EPs

- Strictly for Grown Ups Decca DFE 6584
- Paddy Roberts Strikes Again (with The Dennis Wilson Octet) Decca DFE 6641
- Paddy^{[A]} Decca DFE 6701

Notes:

- A Featuring recordings not issued on albums.

=== Discography notes ===
Many of Roberts' recordings were made available in the United States. "Merry Christmas You Suckers" was issued with an alternative title of "And A Happy New Year".

Although most of the albums were only issued in mono, it appears that the studio albums at least were recorded in stereo. The tracks from Strictly For Grown Ups that are included on The World of Paddy Roberts" are in stereo, leading to the assumption that the whole album was recorded that way (but never issued in this format). Songs for Gay Dogs was issued in stereo for the first time in 2006 when released on CD, which indicated that ...But Not in front of the Children was also recorded that way.

The musical director on most recordings was Dennis Wilson, the exceptions being Songs For Gay Dogs (Peter Knight), Funny World (Ronnie Aldrich), Live at the Blue Angel (Barry Morgan) and Doctor Dolittle (Cyril Stapleton). The director for "Love Is A Wonderful Thing" / "Send For Me" was Johnny Pearson. There is no director listed for his MFP album.

All Decca material with the exception of ...But Not in front of the Children and Funny World was produced by Hugh Mendl.

=== CD releases ===
- Strictly For Grown Ups/Paddy Roberts Tries Again Must Close Saturday Records MCSR 3022
- Songs For Gay Dogs/Funny World Must Close Saturday Records MCSR 3034

Strictly For Grown Ups has also been released without Paddy Roberts Tries Again, but with various other Roberts compositions sung by others on MCSR 3046.

== Bibliography ==
- Tin Pan Alley (1958) Coram (Publishers) Ltd, hardcover – Paddy Roberts (words), Michael Ffolkes (illustrations)

== See also ==
- List of artists under the Decca Records label
