= Eve Boswell =

South African singer (1922–1998)

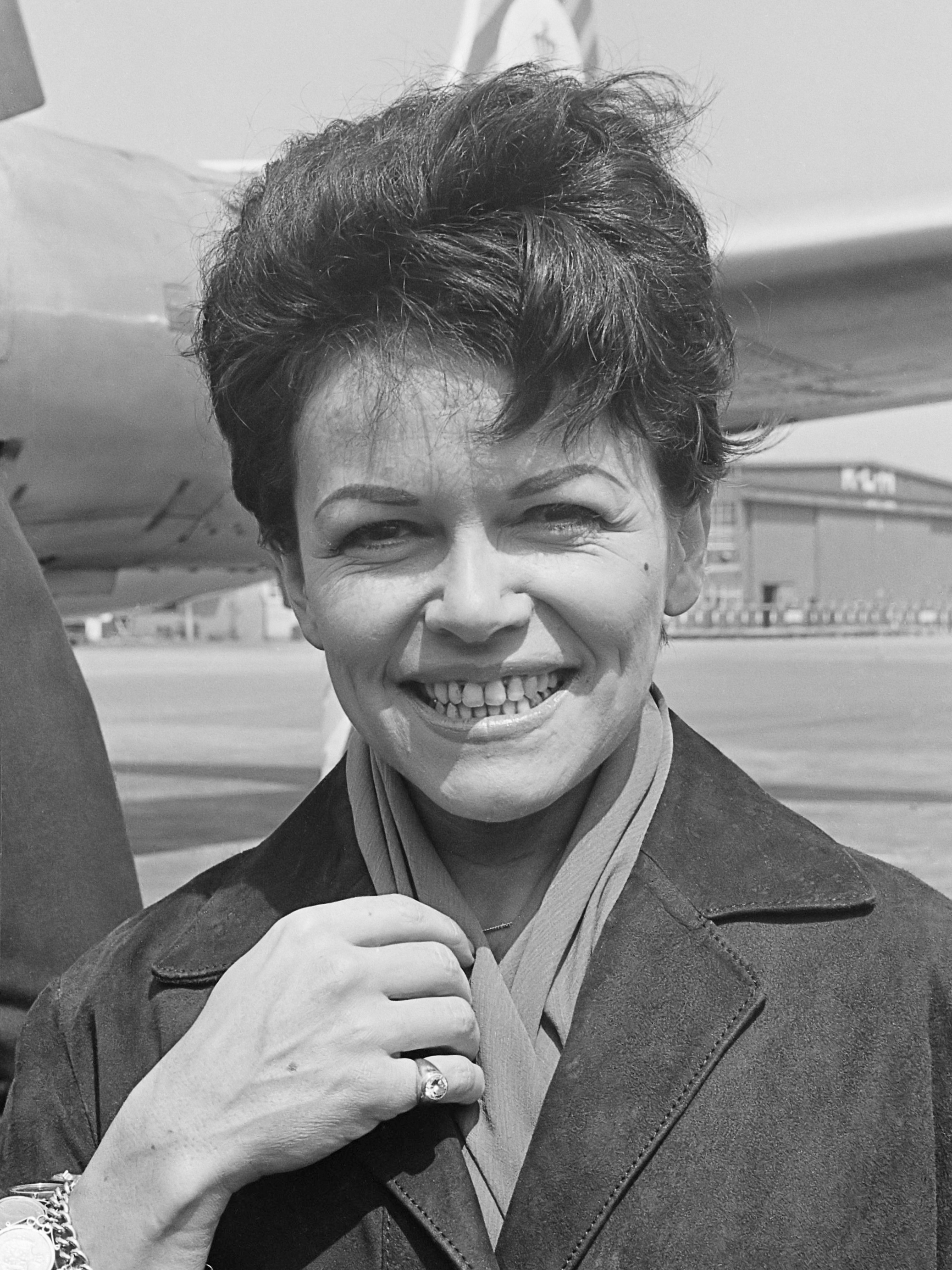
- Eve Boswell (1964)

Background information
- Born: Éva Edith Keleti; 11 May 1922; Budapest, Kingdom of Hungary
- Died: 14 August 1998 (aged 76) Durban, KwaZulu-Natal, South Africa
- Genre: Traditional pop
- Years active: 1950s

Eve Boswell (born Éva Edith Keleti; 11 May 1922 – 14 August 1998), was a Hungarian-born South African pop singer. With the outbreak of the Second World War, Boswell's family moved to South Africa, where they worked with the Boswell Circus. After a few years in South Africa, during which she got married, Boswell was offered a temporary contract to work with a band in the United Kingdom. Boswell's success with that contract eventually led to her becoming a popular solo singer in Britain in the 1950s.

== Career ==
Éva Keleti was born in Hungary to professional musician parents, Hugo Keleti and Lucy Prager, who toured worldwide. Educated in Switzerland, she studied piano before joining her parents on tour as the juggling act, Three Hugos. When the Second World War was declared, the family left Britain with the Boswell Circus. She married, and as Eve Boswell became a popular singing star in South Africa.

In 1949, she was heard by bandleader Geraldo (Gerald Bright), who persuaded her to return to Britain as a singer in his band, which was widely heard on BBC Radio. Boswell was the singing voice of Vera-Ellen in the 1951 British film Happy Go Lovely. She parted with Geraldo in 1951, and launched a solo career. Her first hit record came the following year with "Sugar Bush", partly sung in Afrikaans. Starting in March 1952, she toured for several months with comedian Derek Roy in a musical revue, Happy-Go-Lucky, before flying to Korea to entertain the armed forces. In 1953, she was with Harry Secombe in Show of Shows at Blackpool Opera House. She was given her own radio show on the BBC's Light Programme called Time to Dream in October 1953, and she appeared in the 1953 Royal Variety Performance at the London Coliseum. Boswell played alongside Tommy Cooper in Happy and Glorious and later with him in pantomime in 1954 in Humpty Dumpty at the Dudley Hippodrome. Boswell became a British citizen in 1955.

Her major chart hit came with "Pickin' a Chicken", a South African tune with new words, which rose to No. 9 on the UK Singles Chart at the start of 1956. Her first LP, Sugar and Spice, on which she sang 10 songs in nine different languages, followed later in the year. A continuous programme of radio and TV work and tours followed, leading to more than one mental breakdown.

She faded from public view as public tastes for pop music changed through the late 1950s and 1960s. Her husband died in 1970, and she opened her own singing studio in London, Studio 9, in 1974. She later returned to South Africa, where she married the radio producer Henry Holloway, who produced her last LP, It's a Breeze, recorded in 1979.

== Personal life ==
In 1943, Boswell married Trevor McIntosh in Gobabis, Namibia; he acted as her manager. The union was dissolved in 1965. Her adopted son from the marriage was found dead at her home in July 1998. Boswell married South African broadcaster Henry Holloway in 1976.

== Discography ==
=== Albums ===
- Sugar and Spice (Parlophone, 1956)
- Sentimental Eve (Parlophone, 1957; with the Reg Owen Orchestra, issued in America in 1958 as The War Years on Capitol Records)
- Following the Sun Around (Parlophone, 1959)
- At the Mediterranean (South Africa) (Continental Records, 1961)
- Goeie Nuus! Good News (South Africa) (Brigadiers, 1962)
- Sugar Bush '76 (EMI Records, 1976)
- It's a Breeze (Sugarbush Records, 1979)

=== Singles ===
==== As vocalist with Geraldo ====
Parlophone releases, with Eve Boswell's vocals on one side only:

- "Again" (1949)
- "My Golden Baby" (1949)
- "Confidentially" (1949)
- "Best of All" (1950)
- "Dear Hearts and Gentle People" (1950)
- "You're Only Dreaming" (1950)
- "All My Love" (1951)
- "If" (1951)
- "Mariandl-andl-andl" (with Derrick Francis, 1951)

==== Solo releases ====
All below released on Parlophone, unless stated otherwise.

- "I Can Dream, Can't I?" / "Mamma Knows Best" (1950)
- "Bewitched" / "If I Loved You" (1950)
- "Your Heart and My Heart" / "I Remember the Cornfields" (1950)
- "Beloved, Be Faithful" / "Yes! I'll Be There" (1950)
- "My Heart Cries for You" / "All My Life" (1951)
- "Transatlantic Lullaby" / "Broken Heart" (1951)
- "Would You" / "I'm in Love Again" (1951)
- "I'll Be Around" / "The Way That the Wind Blows" (1951)
- "I Never Was Loved By Anyone Else" / "While We're Young" (1952)
- "We Won't Live in a Castle" / "Paradise" (1952)
- "Please, Mr. Sun" / "Love's Last Word Is Spoken" (1952)
- "Dance Me Loose" (with Derek Roy) / "Just For Old Times"
- "Sugar Bush" / "I'm Yours" (1952)
- "Here in My Heart" / "I Ain't Gonna Marry" (1952)
- "Moon Above Malaya" / "Oh My Love, Oh My Heart" (1952)
- "Hi-Lili, Hi-Lo" / "Everything I Have Is Yours" (1953)
- "Old Johnnie Goggabee" / "Your Mother and Mine" (1953)
- "I Believe" / "Tell Me You’re Mine" (1953)
- "The Bridge of Sighs" / "Time to Dream" (1953)
- "Tell Me Who's Your Sweetheart" (with The Song Pedlars) / "Dare I" (1953)
- "If You Love Me (I Won't Care)" / "Why?" (1953)
- "A Million Stars" / "Don't Ever Leave Me" (1953)
- "Crystal Ball" / "Romany Violin" (1954)
- "Bewitched" / "Playing with Fire" (1954)
- "Du Bist Mein Liebchen" / "The Little Shoemaker" (1954)
- "Not I" / "More Than Ever" (with The Kentones) (1954)
- "Skokiaan" / "On the Waterfront" (1954)
- "These Are the Things We'll Share" / "Open Your Heart" (1955)
- "Ready, Willing, and Able" / "Pam-Poo-Dey" (1955)
- "The Heart You Break" / "Tika Tika Tok" (1955)
- "That's All I Need" / "No Such Luck" (1955)
- "Pickin' A-Chicken" / "Blue Star (The "Medic" Theme)" (1955)
- "Young and Foolish" / "Where You Are" (1956)
- "It's Almost Tomorrow" / "Cookie" (1956)
- "Keeping Cool with Lemonade" / "Down By the Sugar Cane" (1956)
- "Sarie Marais" / "Come Back My Love" (1956)
- "True Love" (Solo piano, Eve Boswell) / "Where in the World is Billy?" (1956)
- "Rock Bobbin' Boats" / "Tra La La" (1957)
- "Chantez, Chantez" / "She Said" (1957)
- "With All My Heart" / "Sugar Candy" (1957)
- "Stop Whistlin' Wolf" / "The Gypsy in My Soul" (1957)
- "Swedish Polka" / "Tell My Love" (1957)
- "Bobby" / "(I Love You) For Sentimental Reasons" (1958)
- "I Do" / "Love Me Again" (1958)
- "Voom - Ba - Voom" / "Left Right Out of My Heart" (1958)
- "More Than Ever" / "I Know Why" (1958)
- "The Christmas Tree" / "Christmas Lullaby" (1958)
- "Piccaninny" / "If I Had a Talking Picture of You" (1959)
- "Wimoweh Cha Cha" / "Boegoeberg Se Dam" (1959)
- "Once Again" / "You Are Never Far Away from Me" (1959)
- "Turnabout Heart" / "Misty" (1959)
- "Love Me" / "You're My Thrill" (Decca, 1962)
- "Never Too Late" / "Let's Get Away" (1963)
- "This Is My Love" / "Lonely in a Crowd" (Morgan, 1969)
- "One God" / "Love Song" (Phoenix, 1974)
- "Sugar Bush '76" / "This Time" (EMI, 1976)
