= A Blossom Fell =

Single by Nat King Cole
- B-side: "If I May"
- Released: April 11, 1955
- Recorded: 1954
- Studio: Capitol, 5515 Melrose Ave, Hollywood
- Genre: Traditional pop
- Length: 3:00
- Label: Capitol
- Songwriter(s): Howard Barnes, Harold Cornelius, Dominic John

Nat King Cole singles chronology
"Darling, Je Vous Aime Beaucoup" (1955)	"A Blossom Fell" (1955)	"If I May" (1955)

"A Blossom Fell" is a popular song written by Howard Barnes, Harold Cornelius, and Dominic John and published in 1954.

The best-known version was recorded by Nat King Cole. The recording was released by Capitol Records as catalog number 3095. The B-side was "If I May." The record first reached the Billboard magazine charts on April 27, 1955, and lasted 20 weeks on the chart, peaking at #2. (Note that in this era, Billboard combined data for both sides of two-sided hits, so the #2 status applies to the combination of "A Blossom Fell" and "If I May").

Nat King Cole recorded the song again for his album The Nat King Cole Story (1961).

== Other versions ==
- In the UK "A Blossom Fell" was even more popular with 3 cover versions to reach the UK charts: The first one was by Dickie Valentine who entered the UK listings on 18 February 1955 and climbed up to the # 10 spot. One week later the version by Nat King Cole appeared and outsold Valentines recording by reaching #3. Finally Ronnie Hilton's version charted at #10 a few weeks later.
