= Blue Star (song) =

"Blue Star" is a popular song.

The theme music of the television series, Medic, was written by Victor Young and copyright on February 17, 1955, under the title "The Medic Theme." A set of lyrics was written by Edward Heyman (who had a history of collaborating with Young) and with those lyrics and under the new title "Blue Star," a new copyright was issued on May 5, 1955.

== Recordings ==
Vocal versions

- Eve Boswell With Glen Somers And His Orchestra, Parlophone, (1955)
- Felicia Sanders with Norman Leyden Orchestra, Columbia Records, (1955)
- Bing Crosby recorded the song in 1955 for use on his radio show and it was subsequently included in the box set The Bing Crosby CBS Radio Recordings (1954-56) issued by Mosaic Records (catalog MD7-245) in 2009.
- Jan Peerce with Hugo Winterhalter And His Orchestra*, RCA Victor, (1955)
- Linda Scott on Starlight, Starbright, Canadian-American, (1961)
- Cyril Stapleton & His Orchestra with Julie Dawn, (1955) with the B-side being "Honey-Babe".

Instrumental versions

- Ron Goodwin & His Orchestra on Orchestra De Luxe Parlophone (1955)
- Rudi Wairata and his Amboina Serenaders recorded as "Bintang Malam" on Amboina, CID/RCA Records, (1955)
- Stanley Black on Plays For Latin Lovers, Decca Records, (1957)
- Earl Grant on The Versatile Earl Grant, Decca Records, (1958)
- Mantovani and His Orchestra, on Songs to Remember, London Records, (1959)
- The Shadows on The Shadows, Columbia Records, (1961)
- George Greeley on Piano Rhapsodies of Love, Reprise Records, (1963)
- Kong Ling on This World We Live In, Diamond Records (1964)
- The Ventures on Walk, Don't Run, Vol. 2, Dolton Records, (1964)
- Kai Winding on Mondo Cane #2, Verve Records, (1964)
- Fausto Papetti on I Remember N°3, Philips, (1966)
- Ernest Ranglin – on Softly With Ranglin, Twilight Records, (1969)
- Andrè Carr Orchestra E Coro on Blue Star, Harmony, (1976)
- Jean-Pierre Danel on Guitar Ballads, Puzzle Productions, (2017)
- Emery Deutsch on Emery and his Violin of Love
- Les Baxter and his Orchestra, released on the Capitol Record Label in February of 1955. The recording was used as the musical theme for the American medical drama television series “Medic” that aired on NBC from September of 1954 to August of 1956.

== Other known recordings ==
The Blue Notes, Lucien Bellemare (Canada), I Campioni (Italy), Os Carbonos (Brazil), Paco Serrano, and The Jordans (Brazil).

== Live renditions ==
- Black Dynamites a.k.a. Los Indonesios (Dutch Indorock group) performed "Bintang Malam" live on stage in both Holland and Germany during their early years (1957-1962).
