= Anne Warren =

Child pop singer/Actor

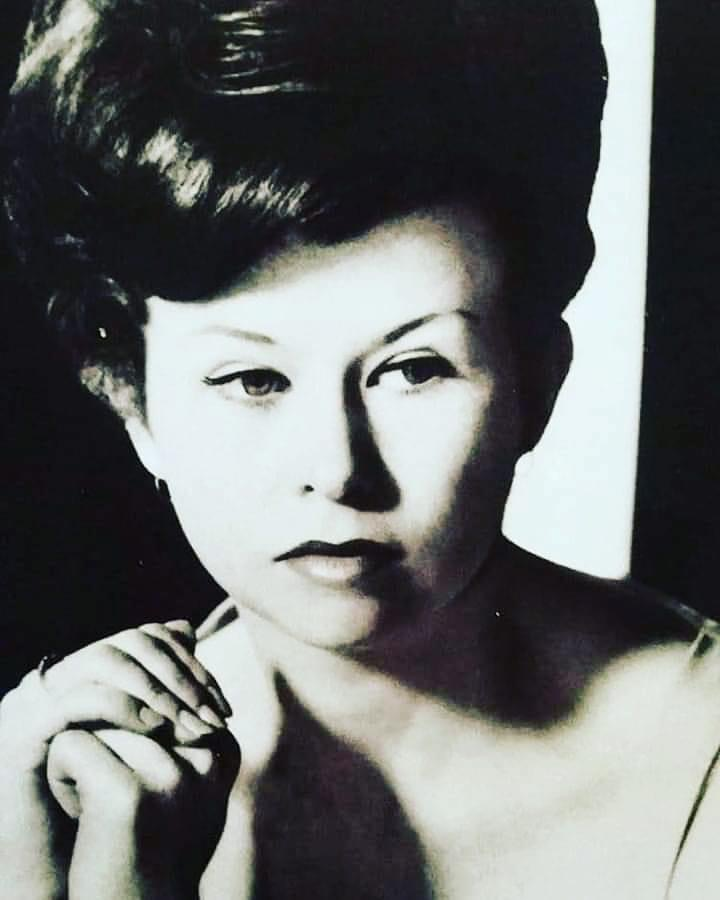
- Publicity picture of Anne Warren

Background information
- Born: 10 April 1942 (age 82); Peebles, Scotland
- Genres: Traditional popular music
- Occupation(s): Singer, actor
- Years active: 1954–1971
- Labels: Columbia (EMI)

Anne Warren (born 10 April 1942) was an English child singer and actor who had a top ten hit with Ruby Murray in 1955.

== Recording history ==
Warren is known to have recorded two singles, both in collaboration with another singer, and both released in March 1955. The singles had consecutive catalogue numbers. The first, "Open Up Your Heart" with Tony Brent, was issued as Columbia DB3579, and the second, "If Anyone Finds This, I Love You" with Murray, was Columbia DB3580. Warren was 12 years old when the singles were released. Both singles were recorded at Abbey Road Studios.

"If Anyone Finds This, I Love You" was a significant hit, reaching number 4 on the New Musical Express singles chart, and number 7 in the Record Mirror chart, in April 1955.
