= Ready, Willing, and Able (1954 song) =

Single by Doris Day
- B-side: "Hold Me in Your Arms"
- Released: 1954
- Length: 2:26
- Label: Columbia
- Composer(s): Al Rinker, Floyd Huddleston, and Dick Gleason

"Ready, Willing, and Able" is a popular song written by Al Rinker, Floyd Huddleston, and Dick Gleason. The song was performed by Doris Day in the 1954 musical film Young at Heart, The song was released in November 1954 together with "Hold Me in Your Arms", both from the same film.

The song is included on the soundtrack album from the movie. Doris Day's recording reached No. 7 on the UK chart in 1955.

The song was also recorded by Eve Boswell in the United Kingdom, in a version where she gets the lyric wrong and as a result loses a rhyme.
