= The Naughty Lady of Shady Lane =

Single by The Ames Brothers

from the album The Best of the Ames Brothers
- B-side: "Addio"
- Released: November 1954
- Recorded: 1954
- Genre: Traditional pop
- Length: 2:49
- Label: RCA Victor
- Songwriter(s): Sid Tepper, Roy C. Bennett

The Ames Brothers singles chronology
"One More Time" (1954)	"The Naughty Lady of Shady Lane" (1954)	"Addio" (1954)

"The Naughty Lady of Shady Lane" is a popular song written by Sid Tepper and Roy C. Bennett.

== Background ==
The lyrics suggest that this "naughty lady" driving the whole town crazy is an attractive young woman who "throws those come-hither glances at every Tom, Dick and Joe" and "when offered some liquid refreshment never says no"; but the last line reveals her to be an infant "nine days old".

== Recordings ==
Popular versions of the song were the 1954 recordings by The Ames Brothers and by Archie Bleyer. The Ames Brothers recorded the song on September 8, 1954. It was released by RCA Victor as catalog number 20-5897. It first reached the Billboard magazine charts on November 20, 1954. On the Disk Jockey chart, it peaked at number 3; on the Best Seller chart, at number 3; on the Juke Box chart, at number 3. This version sold over one million copies in the US, and also peaked at number 6 in the UK Singles Chart in February 1955.

The Bleyer version was released by Cadence Records as catalog number 1254. The record first reached the Billboard magazine charts on November 24, 1954, and lasted 5 weeks on the chart, peaking at number 26. A contemporary review in Billboard compared the two versions by saying: "The Bleyer record has the sound; the Ames disk has the smoothness. Both have style ..."

Dean Martin, Alma Cogan and the McGuire Sisters covered the song in 1955, as well as Ray Charles in 1964 and the Statler Brothers in the 1990s.

In 2004, The Four Lads performed it with Ed Ames on the PBS made for TV special, Magic Moments: The Best of 50s Pop.

In 2007, The Roches recorded a version on their album Moonswept.

== Charts ==
Dean Martin

Chart (1955)	Peak position
United Kingdom (NME)	5
United Kingdom (Record Mirror)	1
