= I See the Moon =

1953 song

Single by Nancy Sinatra
- B-side: "Put Your Head on My Shoulder"
- Released: 1963
- Genre: Pop
- Length: 2:38
- Label: Reprise
- Songwriter: Meredith Willson
- Producer: Tutti Camarata

Nancy Sinatra singles chronology
"You Can Have Any Boy"	"I See the Moon"	"The Cruel War"

"I See the Moon (Over the Mountain)" is a popular song, written by Meredith Willson in 1953.

== Recordings ==
The Mariners, in the United States, and The Stargazers, in the United Kingdom, had the best-known versions. The Stargazers' recording, released on the Decca Records label, reached number one in the UK Singles Chart in 1954. In taking "I See the Moon" to number one, the Stargazers became the first act in British chart history to reach number one with their first two records to reach the chart. Several singles released in the interim failed to chart. The Stargazers' recording was produced by Dick Rowe, one of eight of his UK chart topping successes in that role. The single sold over 300,000 copies.

The Mariners' version, released in 1953 on Columbia Records, reached number 14 in the United States.

A recording by Don Cameron with Morton Fraser's Harmonica Band was made in London on February 17, 1954. It was released by EMI on the His Master's Voice label as catalog number B 10675.

Nancy Sinatra released a version on Reprise Records in 1963.

== Television adaptation ==
In 1997, the English actress Phoebe Nicholls (as May Thrace) performed the song with piano accompaniment in an adaptation for television of Ruth Rendell's mystery, May and June. It was described as her character's childhood favourite.

== Nursery rhyme ==
There is a nursery rhyme with the same title. It was first collected and recorded in print by Joseph Ritson, an English literary antiquary. It matches a couplet that appears in English as early as 1784 in a work entitled Gammer Gurton's Garland, or, The Nursery Parnassus:

I see the moon, and the moon sees me,
God bless the moon, and God bless me!
