= A Woman in Love =

1955 popular song

Song
- Published: 1955
- Songwriter: Frank Loesser

"A Woman in Love" is a popular song. It was written by Frank Loesser and published in 1955. It was introduced in Samuel Goldwyn's 1955 cinematic adaptation of the Broadway musical Guys and Dolls, for which Loesser contributed three new songs – including "A Woman in Love" – which had not been in the original stage production. In the film, it was sung as a duet between Marlon Brando and Jean Simmons. The cover version by Frankie Laine reached number 1 in the UK Singles Chart in 1956.

== Recorded versions ==
The biggest hit version of the song in America was recorded by The Four Aces featuring Al Alberts, backed by the Jack Pleis Orchestra. It was recorded on October 18, 1955, and released in the United States by Decca Records (catalog number 29725, as a 78 rpm record and 9-29725 as a 45 rpm record). The quartet's version went to number 20 on the Best Sellers In Stores. Frankie Laine also recorded a version for Columbia, which was a big success in the United Kingdom, reaching number 1 on the UK Singles Chart and staying there for four weeks. In the UK, British singer Ronnie Hilton also charted at number 30 with another version of the song. The Four Aces recording reached number 19 in the UK.

A soundtrack EP was released by Decca featuring four songs from the film, including the duet of "A Woman in Love", recorded by Marlon Brando and Jean Simmons.

The recorded versions include those by:

- Stanley Black
- Marlon Brando and Jean Simmons
- Adriano Celentano
- Gregg Edelman
- The Four Aces
- Sergio Franchi covered this song on his 1965 RCA Victor album Live at the Coconut Grove.
- Ronnie Hilton
- Frankie Laine
- Gordon MacRae

== See also ==
- List of UK Singles Chart number ones of the 1950s
