= Cool Water (song) =

1936 song by Bob Nolan

Single by the Sons of the Pioneers
- B-side: So Long to the Red River Valley
- Written: 1936
- Published: 1936
- Released: April 1941
- Recorded: March 27, 1941
- Studio: Chicago, Illinois
- Genre: Country (Hillbilly)
- Label: Decca 5939
- Songwriter: Bob Nolan

"Cool Water" is a song written in 1936 by Bob Nolan. It is about a parched man and his mule traveling a wasteland tormented by mirages. Members of the Western Writers of America chose it as number three on the top-100 Western songs of all time.

== Charting versions ==
The song was first recorded by the Sons of the Pioneers on March 27, 1941, for Decca Records and issued on 78 rpm (catalog 5939), charting briefly in 1941 and peaking at No. 25. On August 8, 1945, The Sons of the Pioneers cut a new recording, this time for RCA Victor (catalog 20-1724). This version was reissued in 1947 in the RCA Victor Musical Smart Set album P-168 "Cowboy Classics." The best-selling recorded version of "Cool Water" was by the Sons of the Pioneers with lead vocal by Vaughn Monroe in 1948, issued by RCA Victor as catalog number 20-2923; the record was on the Billboard chart for 13 weeks beginning on August 6, 1948, peaking at number 9.

Frankie Laine and the Mellomen took it to number two on the British charts in 1955.

== Film appearances ==
- 1945 Along the Navajo Trail – sung by Bob Nolan and the Sons of the Pioneers
- 1945 Saddle Serenade – performed by Jimmy Wakely and the Riders of the Purple Sage
- 1946 Ding Dong Williams – performed by Bob Nolan and the Sons of the Pioneers
- 2011 Rango – performed by Hank Williams
- 2018 The Ballad of Buster Scruggs – sung by Tim Blake Nelson

== Charts ==
Frankie Laine version

Chart performance for "Cool Water"
Chart (1955)	Peak position
United Kingdom (NME)	2
United Kingdom (Record Mirror)	1
