= Dickie Valentine =

British pop singer (1929–1971)

Background information
- Also known as: Richard Bryce
- Born: Richard Maxwell; 4 November 1929; Marylebone, London, England
- Died: 6 May 1971 (aged 41) Glangrwyney, Brecknockshire, Wales
- Genre: Traditional pop
- Occupations: Singer, guitarist
- Instruments: Vocals, guitar
- Years active: 1947–1971
- Labels: Pye Records; Decca Records; Philips Records; President Records; Music for Pleasure; See For Miles Records

Richard Bryce (né Maxwell; 4 November 1929 – 6 May 1971), known professionally as Dickie Valentine, was a British pop singer who enjoyed great popularity in Britain during the 1950s. In addition to several other Top Ten hit singles, Valentine had two chart-toppers on the UK Singles Chart with "Finger of Suspicion", featuring The Stargazers (1954) and the seasonal "Christmas Alphabet" (1955).

== Biography ==
=== Early life ===
Valentine was born Richard Maxwell in November 1929 (his birth father was Dickie Maxwell) in Marylebone, London. He was known as Richard Bryce after his mother married a Mr Bryce.

Valentine's first acting job was at the age of three when he appeared in the British comedy film Jack's the Boy starring Jack Hulbert and Cicely Courtneidge.

=== Music career ===
He developed a flexible vocal style and skills as an impersonator of famous singers. Actor-singer Bill O'Connor overheard Valentine singing as a call boy at Her Majesty's Theatre in London and paid for his voice lessons. He sang in clubs and learned stagecraft to help gain confidence and experience.

While he was in his late teens, Valentine was singing at the Panama Club one night when music publisher Sid Green saw him and brought him to the attention of bandleader Ted Heath. On 14 February 1949, Valentine, then virtually unknown, was signed by Ted Heath to join his band, Ted Heath and his Music, to sing alongside Lita Roza and Dennis Lotis. He was voted the Top UK Male Vocalist in 1952 while singing with the Ted Heath Orchestra, the most successful of all British big bands, and again after going solo in 1954.

In November 1954, Valentine was invited to sing at the Royal Command Performance, and in February 1955 he was top billed at the London Palladium. He also cracked jokes and impersonated entertainers, including Johnnie Ray, Frankie Laine, Mario Lanza and Billy Daniels. He recorded two number one hits, "The Finger of Suspicion" and "Christmas Alphabet". His first chart-topper came only two months after his marriage to Elizabeth Flynn at Caxton Hall, which caused scenes of hysteria and was widely expected to sound the death knell to his career. In reality, 1955 was by far his best chart year, with both the number ones and three others placed in the Top Ten. While his second number one saw Valentine playing 'King Canute' to Bill Haley's incoming tide of rock and roll, "Christmas Alphabet" marked the first time in the UK that a song created for the Christmas market would hit number one. In April 1955, Valentine again topped the bill at the London Palladium for two weeks, a month after winning the male vocalist category in the NME poll. He went on to win this title consecutively from 1953 to 1957.

In 1961, he had a television series Calling Dickie Valentine. In 1966, Valentine partnered with Peter Sellers on the ATV sketch show The Dickie Valentine Show.

Although his fame began to wane during the 1960s, he remained a popular live performer until his death.

=== Death ===
After having played a concert at the Double Diamond Club in Caerphilly, Wales, Valentine was travelling back to a friend's home where he was staying, and was killed outright in a car crash on a single-lane bridge at Glangrwyney, near Crickhowell, Wales, on 6 May 1971, at the age of 41, together with pianist Sidney Boatman and drummer Dave Pearson, both aged 42.

The coroner's inquest revealed that the car was travelling in excess of 90 mph (140 km/h) at time of impact, and that Valentine was driving his wife Wendy's Hillman Avenger, with which he was unfamiliar, while awaiting delivery of his new customised car. He had lost control of the vehicle while attempting to take a dangerous, clearly marked bend. Even though he had travelled on that stretch of road many times and was familiar with its hazards, it was thought that his attention might have been distracted by conversation with his friends, in addition to fatigue, the crash having happened at 4:20am. There was also heavy fog in the area. The coroner returned a verdict of "death by misadventure". Valentine is interred at Slough Crematorium.

=== Plaque ===
A commemorative plaque was unveiled on the new bridge on 7 August 2021 by his son Richard Valentine and other family members and friends of the three musicians.

== Personal life ==
He married Elizabeth Flynn, a Scottish professional ice skater, in 1954. They had two children together, Richard born 1955 (later a television director) and Kim born January 1956, but they divorced in 1967. Valentine married the actress Wendy Wayne in 1968. Prior to the car accident, Wayne and Valentine were scheduled to undertake a twenty-week summer season at the Water Splash in Jersey.

== Discography ==
=== Albums ===
- Presenting Dickie Valentine (Decca, 1954)
- Here Is Dickie Valentine (with the Skyrockets) (Decca, 1955)
- Over My Shoulder (Decca, 1956)
- Heartful of Song (Philips, 1967)
- The Great Dickie Valentine at the Talk of the Town (Philips, 1967)
- The World of Dickie Valentine (Decca, 1971)
- The Very Best of Dickie Valentine (Decca, 1984)
- The Voice (President, 1989)
- This Is Dickie Valentine (Music for Pleasure, 1992)
- My Favourite Songs (Savanna, 1992)
- The Best of Dickie Valentine (Sound Waves, 1994)
- Mister Sandman (See for Miles, 1995)
- The Very Best of Dickie Valentine (Spectrum, 1997)
- The Best of Dickie Valentine (Pulse, 1998)
- One More Sunrise (Castle Music, 2004)
- The Ultimate Collection (Spectrum, 2005)
- The Complete '50s Singles (Acrobat, 2010)

=== Singles ===
Year	Single	Peak chart positions	
Year	Single	AUS	UK
1952	"Broken Wings" b/w "The Homing Waltz"	—	12
1952	"Mademoiselle" b/w "You Belong to Me"	—	—
1953	"All the Time and Everywhere" b/w "Why Should I Go Home"	—	9
1953	"La Rosita" b/w "Fickle Fingers"	—	—
1953	"In a Golden Coach (There's a Heart of Gold)" b/w "The Windsor Waltz"	—	7
1953	"Don't Leave Me Now" b/w "I See You Again Every Night"	—	—
1953	"Guessing" b/w "When I Was Young"	—	—
1953	"Many Times" b/w "Te Amo"	—	—
1954	"My Arms, My Heart, My Love" b/w "You Are My True Love"	19	—
1954	"Cleo and Me-o" (with Joan Regan) b/w "Pine Tree, Pine Over Me"	—	—
1954	"Endless" b/w "I Could Have Told You"	—	19
1954	"It's My Life" b/w "Get Well Soon"	—	—
1954	"The Finger of Suspicion" (with the Stargazers) b/w "Who's Afraid (Not I, Not I, Not I)"	3	1
1954	"Mister Sandman" b/w "Runaround"	—	5
1955	"A Blossom Fell" b/w "I Want You All to Myself (Just You)"	—	9
1955	"Ma Chère Amie" b/w "Lucky Waltz"	—	—
1955	"I Wonder" b/w "You Too Can Be a Dreamer"	—	4
1955	"Hello Mrs. Jones (Is Mary There?)" b/w "Lazy Gondolier"	—	—
1955	"No Such Luck" b/w "The Engagement Waltz"	—	—
1955	"Christmas Alphabet" b/w "Where Are You Tonight?"	—	1
1955	"The Old Pi-Anna Rag" b/w "First Love"	—	15
1956	"Dreams Can Tell a Lie" (with the Keynotes) b/w "Song of the Trees"	—	—
1956	"The Best Way to Hold a Girl" b/w "The Voice"	—	—
1956	"My Impossible Castle" b/w "When You Came Along"	—	—
1956	"Day Dreams" b/w "Give Me a Carriage with Eight White Horses"	—	—
1956	"Christmas Island" b/w "The Hand of Friendship"	—	8
1957	"Chapel of the Roses" b/w "My Empty Arms"	—	—
1957	"Puttin' On the Style" b/w "Three Sides to Every Story"	—	—
1957	"Long Before I Knew You" b/w "Just in Time"	—	—
1957	"Snowbound for Christmas" b/w "Convicted"	—	28
1958	"King of Dixieland" b/w "Love Me Again"	—	—
1958	"In My Life" b/w "Come to My Arms"	—	—
1958	"An Old Fashioned Song" b/w "Take Me in Your Arms"	—	—
1959	"Venus" b/w "Where? (In the Old Home Town)"	—	20
1959	"My Favourite Song" b/w "A Teenager in Love"	—	—
1959	"One More Sunrise (Morgen)" b/w "You Touch My Hand"	—	14
1960	"Standing on the Corner" b/w "Roundabout"	—	—
1960	"Once, Only Once" b/w "A Fool That I Am"	—	—
1961	"How Unlucky Can You Be" b/w "Hold Me in Your Arms (Eternally)"	—	—
1961	"Climb Ev'ry Mountain" b/w "Sometimes I'm Happy"	—	—
1961	"Shalom" b/w "I'll Never Love Again"	—	—
1963	"Lost Dreams and Lonely Tears" b/w "Comes Another Day Another Love"	—	—
1964	"Free Me" b/w "Build Yourself a Dream"	—	—
1965	"It's Better to Have Loved" b/w "Wanted"	—	—
1965	"My World" b/w "In Times Like These"	—	—
1967	"My Blue Heaven" b/w "How Ja Lika"	—	—
1967	"Melina" b/w "Love"	—	—
1968	"Mona Lisa" b/w "Wait for Me"	—	—
1970	"Primrose Jill" b/w "A Fool of a Man"	—	—
1970	"Stay Awhile" b/w "Once in Each Lifetime"	—	—
"—" denotes releases that did not chart or were not released.

== Filmography ==
Year	Film	Role	Notes and awards
1932	Jack's the Boy		
1932	Lord Babs	Minor role (uncredited)	
1954	The Ed Sullivan Show		
1955	Sunday Night at the London Palladium		
1956	Val Parnell's Startime		
1957	Six-Five Special		
1957	Salute to Show Business		
1957	The World Our Stage		
1958	6.5 Special		
1959	The Anne Shelton Show		
1959	Oh Boy!		
1959	Drumbeat		
1960	Life with the Lyons		
1960	Spectacular		
1961	Alfred Marks Time		
1961	Calling Dickie Valentine		
1961	Showtime		
1961	Thank Your Lucky Stars		also was featured in 1963, 1964 and 1965
1964	The Ed Sullivan Show		
1965	The Ed Sullivan Show		
1966	The Ed Sullivan Show		

== See also ==
- List of Christmas number one singles (UK)
- List of number-one singles from the 1950s (UK)
- List of artists under the Decca Records label
- List of artists who reached number one on the UK Singles Chart
- List of stage names
