= List of best-selling singles of the 1950s in the United Kingdom =

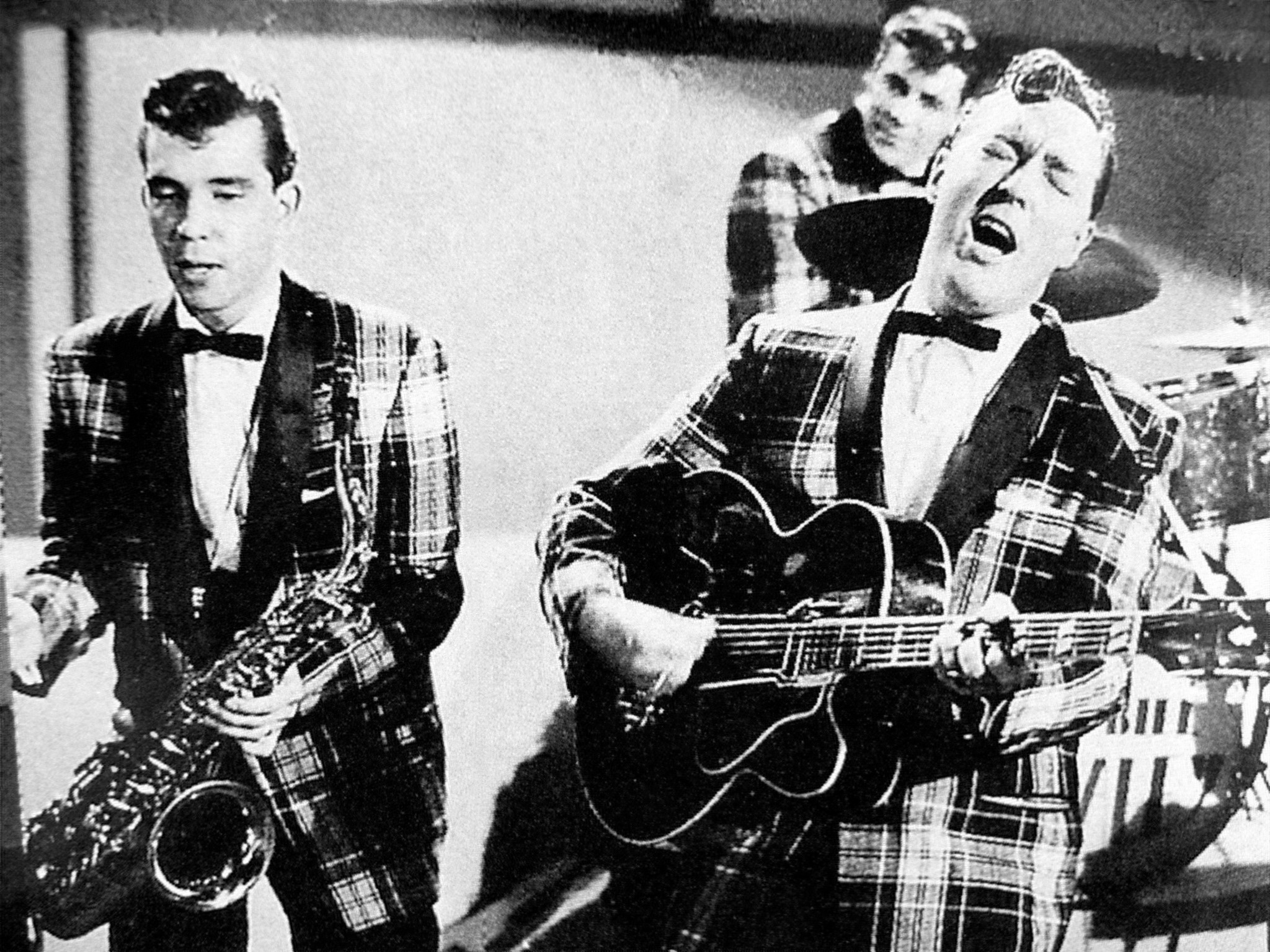
Bill Haley & His Comets had the biggest-selling single of the 1950s with "Rock Around the Clock", the first single in the UK to sell more than one million copies.

Singles are a type of music release that typically have fewer tracks than an extended play or album; during the 1950s, sales of singles in the United Kingdom were compiled by the magazine New Musical Express (NME), and published weekly as a record chart. The singles chart was founded in 1952 by Percy Dickins of the NME, who wanted to imitate the hit parade that featured in the American magazine Billboard; before this, the popularity of a song had been measured by its sales of sheet music. Dickins sampled twenty shops, asking which their ten biggest-selling singles were. His aggregated list of sales was then published in the NME on 14 November 1952 as a Top 12 chart. The NME's chart is considered by the Official Charts Company (OCC) to be the canonical UK Singles Chart during the 1950s; it was expanded to a Top 20 on 1 October 1954.

Sales of records significantly increased in the mid-fifties, following the birth of rock and roll. As a result, the top ten biggest-selling singles of the 1950s were all released in the latter half of the decade. The biggest-selling single of this period was "Rock Around the Clock" by Bill Haley & His Comets, which became the first single ever to sell more than a million copies in the UK.

== Singles ==
Best-selling singles of the 1950s in the UK
No.	Single	Artist	Record label (Note: The record labels, years and chart peaks are those given by the OCC.)	Year	Sales	Chart peak
1	"Rock Around the Clock"	Bill Haley & His Comets	Brunswick	1955	1,390,000	1
2	"Diana"	Paul Anka	Columbia	1957	1,240,000	1
3	"Mary's Boy Child"	Harry Belafonte	RCA	1957	1,170,000	1
4	"What Do You Want to Make Those Eyes at Me For?"	Emile Ford & The Checkmates	Pye	1959	920,000	1
5	"Jailhouse Rock"	Elvis Presley	RCA	1958	880,000	1
6	"What Do You Want?"	Adam Faith	Parlophone	1959	820,000	1
7	"Living Doll"	Cliff Richard & The Drifters	Columbia	1959	770,000	1
8	"All Shook Up"	Elvis Presley	His Master's Voice	1957	740,000	1
9	"Love Letters in the Sand"	Pat Boone	London	1957	710,000	2
10	"It Doesn't Matter Anymore"	Buddy Holly	Coral	1959	680,000	1
