= Lay Down Your Arms (1956 song) =

Single by The Chordettes
- B-side: "Teen Age Goodnight"
- Released: September 1956
- Genre: Traditional pop
- Length: 2:36
- Label: Cadence
- Songwriters: Åke Gerhard, Leon Landgren, Paddy Roberts

The Chordettes singles chronology
"Born to Be with You" (1956)	"Lay Down Your Arms" (1956)	"(Fifi's) Walkin' The Poodle" (1957)

"Lay Down Your Arms" is a 1956 popular music song with music by Åke Gerhard and Leon Landgren and lyrics by Gerhard (originally titled "Anne-Caroline" in Swedish) and Paddy Roberts (for the English lyrics).

== Recorded versions ==
- In the United States, the biggest hit version was recorded by The Chordettes, reaching No. 16 on the Billboard chart.
- In the United Kingdom, forces sweetheart Anne Shelton had the major hit with the song, reaching No. 1 on the UK Singles Chart, and staying in the Top Twenty for 14 weeks. Initially, the BBC took a dim view of the song as it might have encouraged British troops to 'lay down their guns', at a difficult time of the post-Suez Crisis and the conflict in Cyprus with EOKA. The ban was soon lifted when many requested it on Two-Way Family Favourites, a popular Sunday lunchtime radio show. Another UK version was recorded by Billie Anthony.

== In popular culture ==
- The song was used in a British television play written by Dennis Potter called Lay Down Your Arms, which was broadcast on 23 May 1970. The play is set during the Suez crisis of 1956.

== See also ==
- List of UK Singles Chart number ones of the 1950s
