= Christmas Alphabet =

1954 song

"Christmas Alphabet" is a Christmas song written by Buddy Kaye and Jules Loman, first released in 1954 by The McGuire Sisters. The melody is taken from "Skidamarink", the final song of the Broadway production The Echo.

In 1955, a cover version recorded by Dickie Valentine and produced by Dick Rowe became a Christmas number one hit in the UK Singles Chart. It first entered the UK chart on 25 November 1955, where it spent seven weeks, three of which were at No. 1.

In the song, various things the singer associates with Christmas are listed alphabetically. It is notable for being the first UK Christmas chart-topper that is actually about Christmas, a trend that would continue on and off over the next several decades.

A Christmas special of America's Funniest Home Videos released in 1999, "Unwrapped for the Holidays" hosted by actor Richard Kind, features a video of preschoolers performing the song at a concert. As part of the concert, children showed a card with a letter in "Christmas" to the audience as each lyric about a particular letter was sung. However, the "C", "R", "T", "M", and "A" cards were held upside down. The video won the first place prize, $10,000.

Preceded by "Rock Around the Clock" by Bill Haley & His Comets	UK Singles Chart Number 1 single Dickie Valentine; 8 December 1955 for 3 weeks	Succeeded by "Rock Around the Clock" by Bill Haley & His Comets
