= Yes Tonight Josephine =

Single by Johnnie Ray
- Written: Winfield Scott; Dorothy Goodman,
- Producer: Mitch Miller

"Yes Tonight Josephine" is a 1957 song written by Winfield Scott and Dorothy Goodman, and performed by Johnnie Ray. It was a hit single in both the US and UK.

== Chart performance ==
Ray's recording was produced by Mitch Miller, and in the US, peaked at number 12 on the Most Played by Jockeys chart. Outside the US, "Yes Tonight Josephine" gave Ray his third and final number one hit in the UK. The single first entered the UK Singles Chart on 10 May 1957, and peaked at number one for three weeks in June. The original record was only available as a 78 rpm disc. Altogether, it spent 16 weeks on the chart.

== Cover versions ==
- A cover version by British rockabilly revival band the Jets peaked at number 25 on the UK Singles Chart in 1981.
