= It's Almost Tomorrow =

1955 song performed by The Dream Weavers

Single by The Dream Weavers
- B-side: "You've Got Me Wondering"
- Released: 1955
- Genre: Traditional pop
- Length: 2:48
- Label: Decca (US); Brunswick (UK)
- Songwriters: Lyrics: Wade Buff; Music: Gene Adkinson

"It's Almost Tomorrow" is a 1955 popular song with music by Gene Adkinson and lyrics by Wade Buff. The song was actually written in 1953, when Adkinson and Buff were in high school. Hit versions were released in 1955 by The Dream Weavers, Jo Stafford, David Carroll, and Snooky Lanson.

The song reached No. 6 on the Cash Box Top 50, in a tandem ranking of The Dream Weavers, Jo Stafford, David Carroll, Snooky Lanson, and Lawrence Welk's versions, with The Dream Weavers and Jo Stafford's versions marked as bestsellers, while reaching No. 4 on Cash Box's chart of "The Nation's Top Ten Juke Box Tunes", in the same tandem ranking. The song also reached No. 4 on Billboard's Honor Roll of Hits, with The Dream Weavers and Jo Stafford's versions listed as best sellers.

The song was ranked No. 36 on Billboard's ranking of "1956's Top Tunes", based on the Honor Roll of Hits.

== The Dream Weavers’ version ==
The Dream Weavers, a singing group including writers Adkinson and Buff, recorded the most successful version of the song for Decca Records (catalog number 29683). Their version initially charted in Billboard on November 12, 1955, and reached No. 7 on Billboard's chart of Most Played in Juke Boxes, No. 8 on Billboard's Top 100, No. 8 on Billboard's chart of Best Sellers in Stores, No. 10 on Billboard's chart of Most Played by Jockeys, and No. 9 on Cash Box's chart of "The Ten Records Disk Jockeys Played Most This Week". The Dream Weavers' version also reached No. 1 on the UK's New Musical Express chart.

== Jo Stafford version ==
"It's Almost Tomorrow"

Single by Jo Stafford with Paul Weston and His Orchestra
- B-side: "If You Want to Love (You Have to Cry)"
- Released: 1955
- Genre: Traditional pop
- Length: 2:45
- Label: Columbia
- Songwriters: Lyrics: Wade Buff; Music: Gene Adkinson

Jo Stafford also released a hit version of the song in 1955 (Columbia Records catalog number 40595). Stafford's version reached No. 14 on Billboard's chart of Most Played in Juke Boxes, No. 19 on Billboard's Top 100, No. 25 on Billboard's chart of Best Sellers in Stores, and No. 20 on Billboard's chart of Most Played by Jockeys.

== Other versions ==
Snooky Lanson released a version of the song in 1955, which reached No. 20 on Billboard's Top 100, No. 20 on Billboard's chart of Most Played in Juke Boxes, and No. 20 on Billboard's chart of Most Played by Jockeys.

David Carroll released a version of the song in 1955, with vocals by the Jack Halloran Singers. Carroll's version reached No. 20 on Billboard's chart of Most Played by Jockeys, and No. 34 on Billboard's Top 100.

In the UK, the song was covered by Eve Boswell in March 1956 on Parlophone MSP 6220 and later, Mark Wynter in November 1963. That was released by Pye Records as catalogue number 7N15577. His cover version peaked at No. 12 on the UK's Record Retailer chart.

Ronnie Dove recorded the song for his One Kiss for Old Times' Sake album for Diamond Records in 1965.

Jimmy Velvet released a version in 1965, which reached No. 93 on the Billboard Hot 100 chart and No. 29 on Billboard's Easy Listening chart.

== See also ==
- List of UK Singles Chart number ones of the 1950s
