= The Johnston Brothers =

British vocal group

The Johnston Brothers were a vocal group who had a No. 1 hit in the UK Singles Chart in 1955 with their cover version of "Hernando's Hideaway".

The group was formed by Johnny Johnston (born John Harold Johnston, 10 July 1919 – 10 June 1998, London). He had formed a music publishing company, Michael Reine Music, in London in 1946, and was used by the BBC Light Programme radio channel as a singer and arranger. His first big success was to write and perform, with his vocal quartet The Keynotes, the theme to the successful comedy series Take It From Here in 1948. The Keynotes remained a popular singing group in the United Kingdom throughout the 1950s, winning several awards but having no hit records.

In 1949, Johnston formed an all-male singing trio, The Johnston Brothers, the other members being Alan Dean, Eddie Lester and Canadian singer Denny Vaughan (who died in 1972). They won a recording contract with Decca Records, and had their first UK Top 10 hit in 1953 with "Oh Happy Day". In November 1955, their version of "Hernando's Hideaway", from the movie The Pajama Game, reached the number one spot for two weeks, beating off the American versions by both Johnnie Ray and Archie Bleyer. The Johnston Brothers had a number of smaller follow-up hits in the UK, including the medley "Join in And Sing Again" (1955) and "Heart" (1957), and also recorded with Joan Regan. They provided backing for the British vocalist, Suzi Miller, on their UK No. 14 joint hit, "Happy Days and Lonely Nights" in 1955.

By 1956, Johnston had established Johnny Johnston Jingles Ltd., which was responsible for hundreds of advertising jingles in the early years of British commercial television, including "A million housewives every day pick up a can of beans and say – Beanz Meanz Heinz!", "You can be sure of Shell", and the first ever colour TV commercial in Britain, for Birds Eye peas in 1969.
