= The Finger of Suspicion (Points at You) =

Song by Dickie Valentine
- Written: Paul Mann, Al Lewis
- Published: 1954
- Genre: Pop
- Label: Decca Records
- Producer: Dick Rowe

"The Finger of Suspicion (Points at You)" is a popular song written by Paul Mann and Al Lewis, and published in 1954.

It was recorded by Dickie Valentine in the United Kingdom and by Jane Froman in the United States. Valentine's version reached number one in the UK Singles Chart in 1955. Valentine's version was produced by Dick Rowe and released on Decca Records. The track was a UK chart topper twice over. Firstly for one week from 7 January 1955, and then for a further two weeks from 21 January. Its chart topping run was interrupted by "Mambo Italiano".
