= The Dream Weavers =

American vocal group

The Dream Weavers was an American popular music, vocal group, famous in the 1950s, formed at the University of Florida by Gene Adkinson (baritone and ukulele) and Wade Buff (lead vocals).

== History ==
The Dream Weavers consisted primarily of Gene Adkinson and Wade Buff. Other members included Lee Turner, Eddie Newson, Sally Sanborn, Mary Carr and Mary Rude at various times. The two met as sophomores in their respective high schools (Adkinson at Miami Edison Senior High School, Buff at Coral Gables Senior High School) when both were members of The Greater Miami Boys' Drum and Bugle Corps, a 100-piece band and drill team. They became friends and composed a number of songs while still in high school. They both went on to attend the University of Florida in Gainesville, where they performed in a freshman talent show before 5,000 students and won. As a result, they were given a twice-weekly half-hour radio program slot at WRUF in 1955. With the program ending at 10:30pm, they felt it appropriate to sign off with a song they had composed in high school in 1953, "It's Almost Tomorrow" (words by Buff, music by Adkinson). Buff served as the lead singer, and the third part was sung by various female singers (Sally Sanborn, Mary Carr, Mary Rude, and others).

The announcer of the show, Chuck Murdock, thought of running a contest on the show to name the group, and the contest winner stated that because the song they wrote was dreamy, they were weavers of dreams, thus "The Dream Weavers".

After making a recording of "It's Almost Tomorrow" in Jacksonville, the song got played on the radio in Miami, and this led to recognition by Milt Gabler at Decca Records. As a result, Decca cut a new recording of the song. It charted in 1956, reaching the Top Ten in the United States of America. It entered the Billboard 100 on November 12, 1955, having a chart life of 21 weeks and a top placing of No. 8. It sold over one million copies. It was released by Brunswick Records in the United Kingdom, where it hit the chart on February 10, 1956, and reached number one on March 16, holding the top spot for two weeks, before being displaced by "The Rock And Roll Waltz" by Kay Starr, only to return the following week for a further one week stay at the top. In total the song was in the UK chart for 18 weeks. However, it was the only chart appearance by the group in the UK, thus condemning The Dream Weavers to the one hit wonder tag.

The group had one subsequent minor hit in America. "A Little Love Can Go A Long Way", taken from the TV play Joey, made the Billboard 100 at No. 33 for just one week on May 19, 1956. The Dream Weavers recorded two further singles, but neither charted.

In March 1956, Buff married Mary Rude, who was a fellow 1952 graduate of Edison High and had sung with the group. After their honeymoon, he rejoined the group to travel, but after a short while decided that travelling on the road was not compatible with a good marriage. He let Adkinson have full control of the group, and as a result of auditions in New York, Lee Raymond replaced Buff. When Adkinson got drafted into the United States Army however, the duo ended its short existence.

Gene Adkinson (born February 28, 1934) died from cancer near his home in Point Richmond, California, on June 19, 2009, at the age of 75.

Wade Buff (born on July 7, 1934, in Miami, Florida) died on April 8, 2022, at the age of 87. He was survived by his wife of 66 years, Mary Buff.

Lee Turner (born on November 22, 1936, in Jacksonville, Florida) died on March 5, 2026, at the age of 89.

Mary Rude Buff (born August 30, 1934, in Miami, Florida) died on September 8, 2026, at the age of 92.
