= Dreamboat =

Single by Alma Cogan
- B-side: "Irish Mambo"
- Released: 1955
- Songwriter(s): Jack Hoffman
- Producer(s): Walter Ridley

Alma Cogan singles chronology
"Tika Tika Tok" (1955)	"Dreamboat" (1955)	"Where Will The Dimple Be?" (1955)

"Dreamboat" is a popular music song, the words and music to which were written by Jack Hoffman, (sometimes incorrectly attributed to Al Hoffman).

A version produced by Walter Ridley, and performed by Alma Cogan, reached number 1 in the UK Singles Chart in 1955 for two weeks, and is one of Cogan's best known hits.
