= Rose Marie (song) =

1924 popular song

Song
- Released: 1924
- Genre: Popular song
- Composers: Rudolf Friml, Herbert Stothart
- Lyricists: Otto Harbach, Oscar Hammerstein II

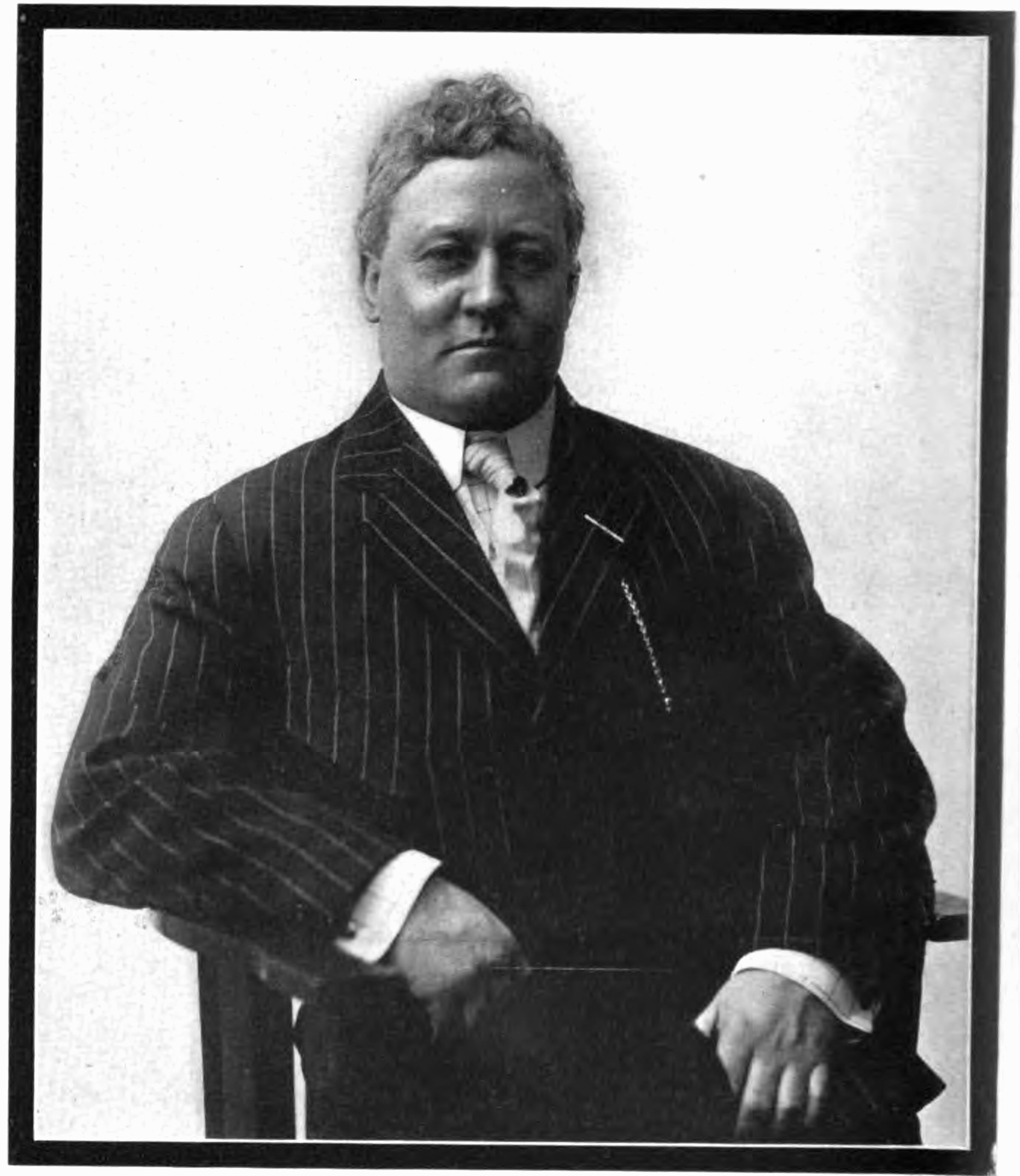
Arthur Deagon in 1908

"Rose Marie" is a popular song from the musical or operetta of the same name. The music was written by Rudolf Friml and Herbert Stothart, the lyrics by Otto Harbach and Oscar Hammerstein II. In the original Broadway production in 1924, the song was performed by Dennis King and Arthur Deagon, as the characters Jim Kenyon and Sergeant Malone.

The song, along with the rest of Rudolf Friml and Herbert Stothart's original Broadway score, was omitted from the silent 1928 film adaptation starring Joan Crawford and James Murray, but was one of the songs from the original operetta included both in the 1936 film starring Jeanette MacDonald and Nelson Eddy, as well as the 1954 version with Ann Blyth and Howard Keel. Karl Denver and David Whitfield have also recorded the song. In 1955, Slim Whitman had a major UK hit with his version.

== Slim Whitman version ==
In 1955, "Rose Marie" was a hit for the American country singer Slim Whitman. Produced by Lew Chudd, of Imperial Records, Whitman's recording of the song spent 11 consecutive weeks at number one in the UK Singles Chart, setting a record that stood until 1991, when Bryan Adams spent 16 weeks at the top of that chart with "(Everything I Do) I Do It for You". Adams' achievement was celebrated by Whitman in November 1991, when he joined Adams on stage at Wembley Arena to sing "Rose Marie", after which he presented Adams with a plaque commemorating the achievement. The previous year, in the US, Whitman had peaked at number five on the Best Sellers in Stores chart. In 2023, Whitman's version of the song was included on the soundtrack of the Wes Anderson film Asteroid City.
