= Give Me Your Word =

Song by Tennessee Ernie Ford
- Released: May 31, 1954
- Songwriter(s): George Wyle and Irving Taylor

"Give Me Your Word" is a popular song written by George Wyle and Irving Taylor in 1954. The biggest selling version, recorded by Tennessee Ernie Ford, was released on 31 May 1954 by Capitol Records in the United States, and reached number 1 in the UK Singles Chart in March 1955. The record was produced by Ken Nelson. "Give Me Your Word" was Ford's first hit in the United Kingdom. The single remained at the top of the UK Singles Chart for seven weeks.

== Cover versions ==
- Billy Fury had a minor hit in the United Kingdom with "Give Me Your Word" in 1966, reaching number 27 on the UK chart. The song was Fury's last single release on the Decca label.
