= Softly, Softly (song) =

Song

"Softly, Softly" is a popular song originally written in French as "La tamise et mon jardin" by Pierre Dudan. The song was given English lyrics in 1954 by BBC executive Robin Scott (using the "Mark Paul" pseudonym) and entertainer Paddy Roberts.

The most popular version of the song was recorded by Northern Irish singer Ruby Murray in January 1955. Produced by Norrie Paramor, it reached No. 1 in the UK Singles Chart for three weeks in February and March 1955.

Other recordings were made in 1955 by Jaye P. Morgan and by Alma Cogan.
