= Ruby Murray =

Northern Irish singer (1935–1996)

- Murray in 1969

Background information
- Born: Ruby Florence Murray; 29 March 1935; Donegall Road, Belfast, Northern Ireland
- Died: 17 December 1996 (aged 61) Torquay, Devon, England
- Genres: Traditional popular music
- Occupation: Singer
- Years active: 1953–1996
- Label: Columbia (EMI)
- Spouse(s): Bernie Burgess (m. 1957-1974; divorced); 2 children Ray Lamar (m. 1991)
- Website: rubymurray.org

Ruby Florence Murray (29 March 1935 – 17 December 1996) was a Northern Irish singer from Belfast. One of the most popular performers in Britain and Ireland in the 1950s, she scored ten hits in the UK Singles Chart between 1954 and 1959, including a no. 1 with Softly, Softly. She also made pop chart history in March 1955 by having five hits in the Top Twenty in a single week. New Musical Express named her Britain's favourite female singer of 1955. Frank Sinatra told her that he was her "greatest fan".

== Child star ==
Ruby Florence Murray was born in Moltke Street, in the "Village" area of the Donegall Road in south Belfast. She was the youngest child of four in a Protestant family and had a Scottish father, Dan. She underwent surgery at six weeks of age due to swollen glands and, as a result, had a very husky voice. As a child she was evacuated to north Antrim during World War II. Entering a public speaking contest run by Eglinton Young Farmers Club, Derry in March 1947, she won a special prize for the youngest competitor under 18. A performance at the Ballymena Variety Theatre in February 1948 received a positive reception and she then toured in Northern Ireland as a child singer. Murray first appeared on television at the age of 12, having been spotted by producer Richard Afton. Owing to laws governing children performing, Murray had to delay her start in the entertainment industry. She returned to Belfast and full-time education until she was 14. Of her voice, Murray joked: "I have to gargle with razor blades to get this effect".

== Chart success ==
Murray kept busy on the variety stage in Northern Ireland in the early 1950s, including performing at the bandstand on the Newcastle seafront, and in 1954 she joined a touring revue called "Yankee Doodle Blarney" which gave her very useful exposure on the English variety stages. Richard Afton offered her the position of resident singer on the BBC's Quite Contrary television show, to replace Joan Regan. After being again spotted by Ray Martin on the first Quite Contrary show, Murray was signed to Columbia and her first single, "Heartbeat", reached No. 3 in the UK Singles Chart in December 1954. "Softly, Softly", her second single, reached number one in early 1955. That year, Murray set a pop chart record by having five hits in the Top Twenty in one week, a feat unmatched for many years. In 2014, the Guinness Book of World Records issued three certificates confirming that at the date of issue, nobody had beaten this record, although it was shared with three other singers. The record by a female singer stood until 2022.

The 1950s was a busy period for Murray, during which she had her own television show, starred at the London Palladium with Norman Wisdom, appeared in a Royal Command Performance (1955) and toured the world. In a period of 52 weeks, starting on 3 December 1954 and lasting until the end of November 1955, Murray constantly had at least one single in the UK charts; this was at a time when only a Top 20 was published.

She sang You are my First Love (a UK Top 20 hit) as the introductory theme song to the 1956 film It's Great to Be Young!

Murray appeared as "Ruby" in her only film role, A Touch of the Sun, a 1956 farce with Frankie Howerd and Dennis Price. A couple of hits followed later in the decade; "Goodbye Jimmy, Goodbye", a No. 10 hit in 1959, was her final appearance in the charts. EMI released a compilation album of her hits on CD in 1989, including songs that regularly featured in her act; "Mr. Wonderful", "Scarlet Ribbons" and "It's the Irish in Me". They updated this with the release of EMI Presents The Magic of Ruby Murray in 1997 and a four CD album, Anthology – The Golden Anniversary Collection, in 2005, the 50th anniversary of her peak successes on the charts.

Murray recorded her last record "I Will Wait for You", in 1971. After her years as a major star, Murray continued performing until close to the end of her life. This included singing for Queen Elizabeth at a Buckingham Palace Christmas party in 1989.

In late 1994 she officially opened the "Women Too" centre in the Village area of Belfast.

== Legacy ==
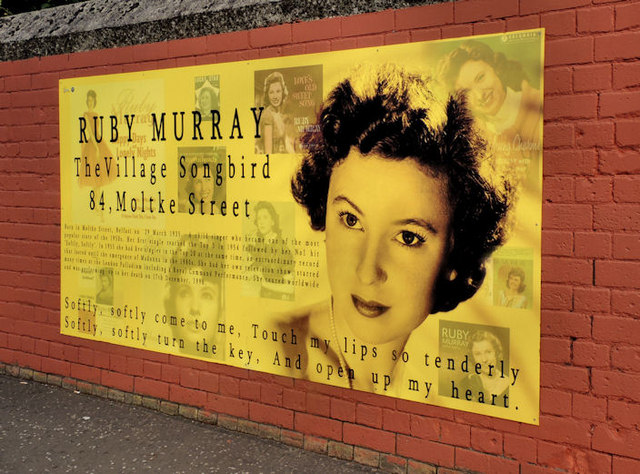
A plaque to Murray in her native Village area

Murray had a shy, girl next door persona, with her appeal to audiences everywhere lying in her "Irish sense of humour and her naturalness". Her popularity led to her name being adopted in Cockney rhyming slang as a rhyme for "curry", something she found amusing. The phrase "have a ruby" appears in various episodes of the BBC TV comedy series Only Fools and Horses. It also appeared in another BBC sitcom series, The Royle Family.

A play about Murray's life, Ruby, written by the Belfast playwright Marie Jones, opened at the Group Theatre in Belfast in April 2000. A second play, by Michael Cameron, opened in Belfast on 13 February 2019 and was sold out at all performances.

Virgin Atlantic G-VYUM, a Boeing 787-9, is named the "Ruby Murray" in her honour.

A Belfast City Council plaque commemorating Murray is mounted inside the foyer of the Ulster Hall, where she used to perform. In February 2019, the Ulster History Circle erected a blue plaque in her honour near to where she had been born. Murray is known locally as "The Village Songbird".

Her children confirmed what their mother said about having been exploited financially, and Murray received very little from song royalties. Her daughter Julie said: "All mum wanted to do was sing. She had very little business acumen at all".

Murray's manager for more than 10 years, Lee Stevens, commented: "She gave happiness to millions of people, but sadly she never found real happiness herself".

Murray observed in 1979: "As long as I’m singing I'm happy".

== Personal life ==
In 1957, while topping the bill with Tommy Cooper in Blackpool, Murray met Bernie Burgess, a member of a successful television and recording vocal quartet, the Four Jones Boys. Shortly afterwards she left Northern Ireland to marry him (within six weeks) and live in Northampton; her family did not approve of the marriage because they didn't know the new husband. Burgess, contrary to press reports, did not become her manager; rather, his role was that of a supporting husband. The couple included a song-and-dance segment in Murray's act during the 1960s. She had very strong feelings for fellow-Belfast star Frank Carson. Counted among her close friends were Max Bygraves and Norman Wisdom.

Like her father, Murray struggled with alcoholism for most of her life; these struggles contributed to the breakdown of her marriage in 1974. The divorce was finalised in 1976 and Murray moved to Torquay to live with an old friend, Ray Lamar, a former stage dancer and theatre impresario, who was 18 years her senior. They married in 1993 and spent the evening with a small party of friends and family at an Italian restaurant in Babbacombe.

Murray had two children from her marriage to Burgess, Julie (b. 1960) and Tim (b. 1965). Tim died unexpectedly from a heart condition in July 2020, aged 55.

She spent her last years in Asprey's Nursing Home, having given up alcohol. She died of bronchial pneumonia and liver cancer on 17 December 1996 aged 61. At her funeral in St Matthias Church in Wellswood, Softly, Softly was played.

Lamar died on 3 August 2005 aged 87. Burgess died on 19 July 2024 aged 95.

== Singles discography ==
- "Heartbeat" (1954) – UK number 3
- "Softly, Softly" (1955) – UK number 1
- "Happy Days and Lonely Nights" (1955) – UK number 6
- "Let Me Go Lover" (1955) – UK number 5
- "If Anyone Finds This, I Love You" (1955) – UK number 4 †
- "Evermore" (1955) – UK number 3
- "I'll Come When You Call" (1955) – UK number 6
- "The Very First Christmas of All" (1955) – UK number 9 (Record Mirror)
- "You are My First Love" (1956) – UK number 16
- "Real Love" (1958) – UK number 18
- "Goodbye Jimmy, Goodbye" (1959) – UK number 10

† Ruby Murray with Anne Warren

A detailed discography is found on the official website.

== See also ==
- List of artists who reached number one on the UK Singles Chart
- List of Northern Irish people
- Culture of Northern Ireland
- List of Belfast people
