= List of UK charts and number-one singles (1952–1969) =

The UK singles chart is the official chart for the United Kingdom of singles. The chart is compiled by the Official Charts Company and the beginning of an "official" singles chart is generally regarded as February 1969 when the British Market Research Bureau (BMRB) started to compile the chart in a joint venture between the BBC and Record Retailer. Charts were used to measure the popularity of music and, initially, were based on sheet music. In 1952, NME imitated an American idea from Billboard magazine and began compiling a chart based on physical sales of the release. Rival publications such as Record Mirror, Melody Maker and Disc began to compile their own charts in the mid-to-late 1950s. Trade paper Record Retailer compiled their first chart in March 1960.

No single chart was universally followed during this period. Retrospectively, the Guinness Book of British Hit Singles and the Official Charts Company have chosen as canonical sources for the era: NME (November 1952 – March 1960) and Record Retailer (March 1960 – February 1969). These choices have not been universally welcomed, particularly that of Record Retailer during the 1960s, when charts like NME had a significantly wider circulation and following. The BBC's Pick of the Pops circumvented the lack of an official chart by aggregating the aforementioned publications to create their own chart.

Notable omissions from the canon are The Rolling Stones' "19th Nervous Breakdown" and The Beatles' "Please Please Me" which both reached number one on the NME, Disc, and Melody Maker charts, topped the BBC's Pick of the Pops aggregated chart and - in the case of "19th Nervous Breakdown" - was announced as number one on Top of the Pops; however, in failing to top the Record Retailer chart, they are not generally regarded as number-one singles.

== Main charts ==
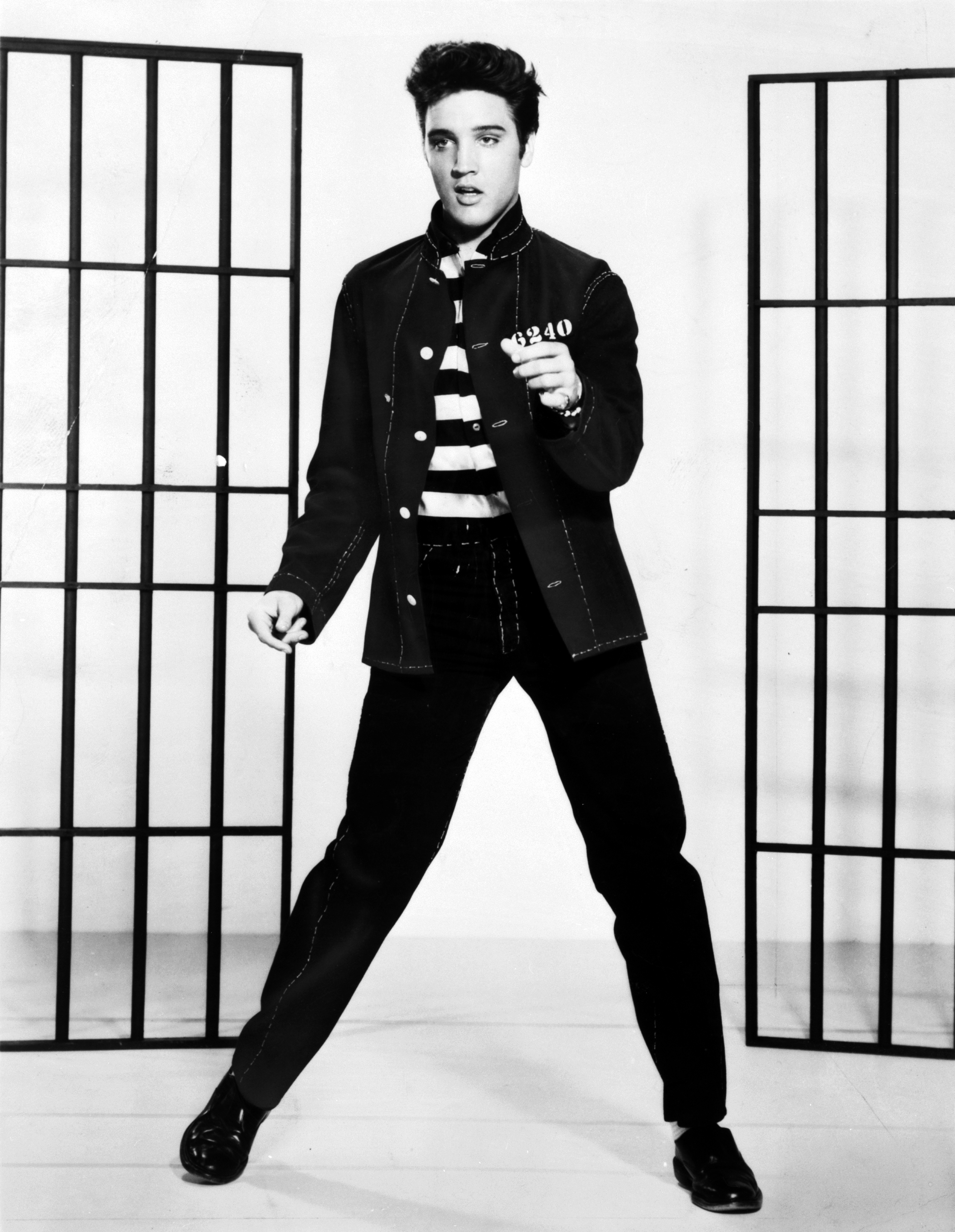
Elvis Presley had nineteen number-one singles between the main five charts before the "official" chart was established. These include thirteen that topped all the main charts published at the time and four not recognised in Official Charts Company's canon.

=== New Musical Express (NME) ===
The New Musical Express (NME) chart was the first in the United Kingdom to gauge the popularity of recorded music by sales; previously, sheet music sales charts had been compiled. NME's co-founder Percy Dickins imitated the chart produced by American Billboard magazine and began to compile Britain's first hit parade in 1952. For the first chart, Dickins telephoned a sample of around 20 shops asking for a list of the 10 best-selling songs. These results were then aggregated to give a Top 12 chart (with 15 entries due to tied positions) that was published in NME on 14 November 1952. Other periodicals produced their own charts and the Official Charts Company and Guinness' British Hit Singles & Albums regard NME as the canonical British singles chart until 10 March 1960. After this Record Retailer is regarded as the canonical source until February 1969, when the British Market Research Bureau (BMRB) chart started. However, during the 1960s NME had the biggest circulation of charts in the decade and was the most widely followed.

After 1969, NME continued to compile charts in the 1970s and 1980s and ended its time as the longest running independently compiled in May 1988.

=== Record Mirror ===
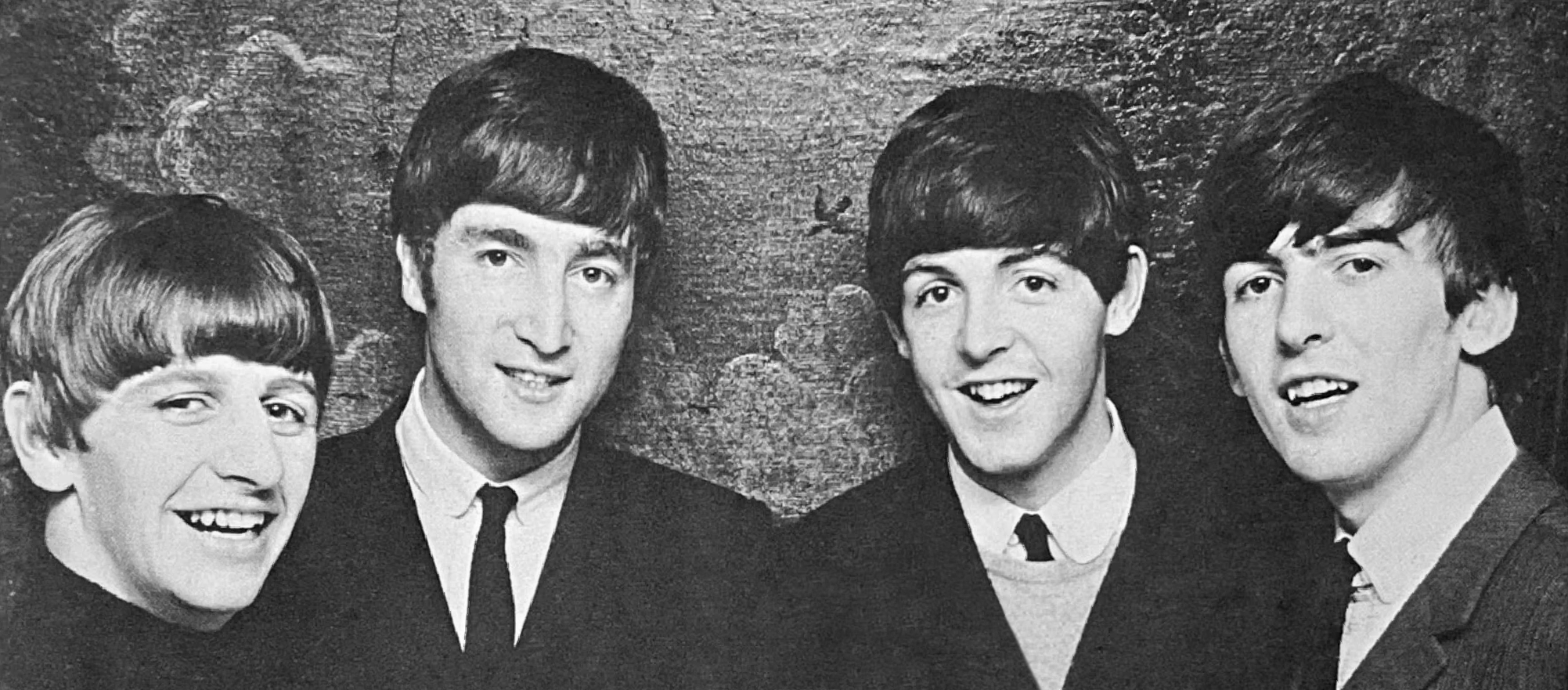
The Beatles had eighteen number-one singles on the five main charts before the BMRB chart started. Fourteen of them topped all the main charts published at the time, and three are not recognised by Official Charts Company's canon.

Record Mirror compiled its own record chart from 1955 until 1962 which was used by many national newspapers. It formed as the first rival to the existing chart published by NME. The Mirror's chart was based on the postal returns from record stores that were financed by the newspaper—rival chart, NME, was based on a telephone poll. Its first chart was a Top 10 published on 22 January 1955 using figures from 24 shops. The chart was expanded from a Top 10 to a Top 20 on 8 October 1955. In the early 1960s some national newspapers switched to using a chart compiled by Melody Maker and, ultimately, the cost of collecting sales figures by post led to the chart's demise. On 24 March 1962, the paper stopped compiling its own chart and started publishing Record Retailer's Top 50.

=== Melody Maker ===
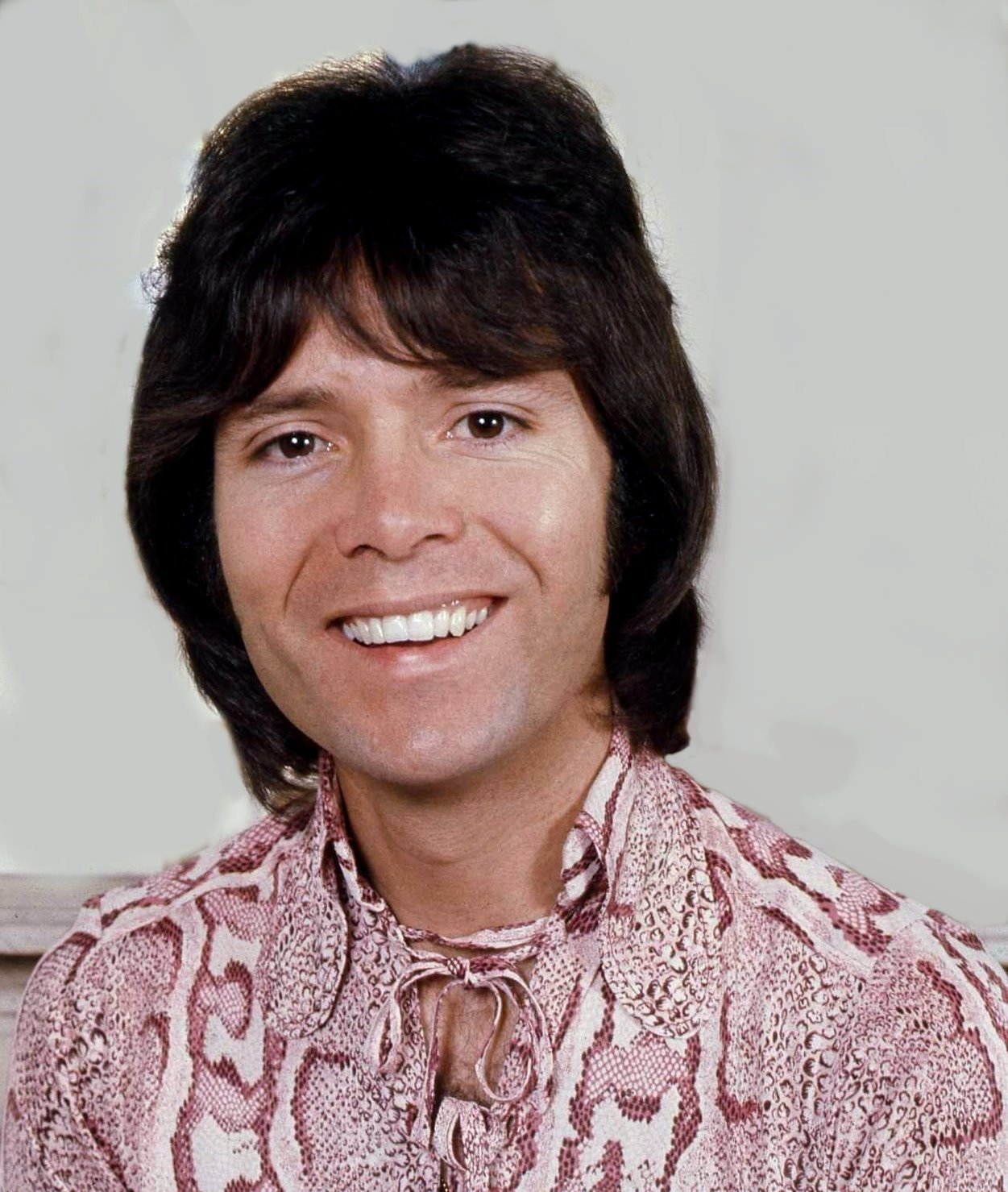
Cliff Richard was the last artist to top all five main charts, spending five or six weeks at the top of each chart with "The Young Ones". Richard had the third most number-one singles during this era; four as a solo artist and six with The Shadows (one as "The Drifters").

Melody Maker compiled its own chart from 1956 until 1988 which was used by many national newspapers. It was the third periodical to compile a chart and rivaled existing compilers NME and Record Mirror. Melody Maker's chart, like NME's, was based on a telephone poll of record stores. Melody Maker compiled a Top 20 for its first chart using figures from 19 shops on 7 April 1956. During the 1950s, sample sizes ranged from around 14–33 shops and on 30 July 1960 the phoning of record shops was supplemented with postal returns; the first chart to use this method sampled 38 stores from 110 returns. On 26 August 1967, Disc, owned by the same company as Melody Maker, stopped compiling their own chart and started using the Melody Maker chart. In its 9 February 1963 edition, Melody Maker disclosed that it received chart returns from 245 retailers and that its chart was audited by auditors supplied by Middlesex County Council.

=== Disc & Music Echo ===
Disc compiled its own chart from 1958 until 1967, the Disc which was used by many national newspapers. It formed as a rival to the existing charts published by NME, Record Mirror, and Melody Maker. Disc's chart, like two of its rivals, was based on a telephone poll of record stores. On 1 February 1958 Disc compiled its first chart which was a Top 20 using figures from 20 shops. Throughout the 1950s Disc's sample sizes remained below 40 shops and in the early 1960s the sample size was increased to approximately 50 and compiled by Fred Zebadee; other rival charts had increased their samples to around 100 but this was too expensive for Disc. On 23 April 1966 the publication Mersey Beat (which ran its own chart) was incorporated into Disc which became Disc and Music Echo. On 26 August 1967, Disc, who was then owned by the same company as Melody Maker, stopped compiling their own chart and started using the Melody Maker chart.

=== Record Retailer ===
Record Retailer was a trade paper that began compiling a record chart in March 1960. Although prior to 1969 there was no official singles chart, Record Retailer is considered by the Official Charts Company to be the canonical source from 10 March 1960 until 15 February 1969 when Retailer and the BBC jointly commissioned the BMRB to compile the charts. The choice to use Record Retailer as the canonical source for the 1960s has been contentious because NME had the biggest circulation of periodicals in the decade and was more widely followed. One source explains that the reason for using the Record Retailer chart for the 1960s was that it was "the only chart to have as many as 50 positions for almost the entire decade". The sample size of Record Retailer in the early 1960s was around 30 stores whereas NME and Melody Maker were sampling over 100 stores. In 1969, the first BMRB chart was compiled using postal returns of sales logs from 250 record shops.

== Other charts ==
=== BBC's Pick of the Pops ===
The BBC first aired Pick of the Pops on its Light Programme radio station on 4 October 1955. Initially airing popular songs, it developed an aggregated chart from March 1958. Using the NME, Melody Maker, Disc and Record Mirror charts the BBC cumulated them by totalling points gained in the four charts (1 point for a number one, 2 for a number two, etc.) to give a form of chart average – however, this method was prone to tied positions. Record Retailer was included in the average from 31 March 1962 after Record Mirror had ceased compiling their chart.

=== Radio Luxembourg ===
In the 1930s, Radio Luxembourg pioneered the United States style of commercial broadcasting in Britain. During the World War II the station broadcast Nazi propaganda and was then used United States troops until September 1946 with English-sponsored programming resuming at the end of the year. In 1946, the Music Publishers' Association began compiling sheet music popularity charts and in 1948 British radio listeners heard their first chart show based on sales of sheet music with Radio Luxembourg broadcasting them during a Top Twenty programme on Sunday evenings.

When programme administrator Derek Johnson heard about NME's chart in the 1950s, he passed them on to disc jockeys at Radio Luxembourg who aired a chart rundown each night. The NME chart was used by Radio Luxembourg from January 1960 to 1967 and is said to have given "the chart acceptance and credence".

=== Big L's Fab 40 ===
Wonderful Radio London, also known as Big L, was a pirate radio station that operated from the MV Galaxy of the coast of Essex. Founded and financially backed by American Don Pierson the station introduced contemporary hit radio, popular in the United States, to the UK. The Fab 40 was the weekly playlist and was broadcast each Sunday as a chart based entirely on airplay. The station closed on 14 August 1967 when the Marine Broadcasting Offences Act 1967 came into effect, Later, rivals to the official chart would factor airplay into their charts.

=== Mersey Beat ===
Mersey Beat was founded initially as a regional bi-weekly publication on 13 July 1961. In 1963 it began compiling a Top 20 chart based on around 10 stores and became a national paper. The charts and paper became weekly on 24 April 1964 and, following an investment in September 1964 by Brian Epstein, expanded the chart and sample size to become the first publication to announce a Top 100 on 3 December 1964. On 6 March 1965 the paper was rebranded Music Echo & Mersey Beat, which later that year became Music Echo, and by 16 April 1966 the chart was no longer published—the following week the newspaper was incorporated into Disc becoming Disc and Music Echo.

=== Top Pops ===
Top Pops was founded initially as a monthly publication in May 1967. In May 1968 it began compiling a chart based on the telephone sample of 12 W H Smith & Son stores. The charts and paper became weekly the following month. Rebranded Music Now by 1970, the chart and paper ceased publication the following year.

== Comparison of chart number-ones (1952–1969) ==
Key
1–18	The number of weeks spent as a number-one single on a chart regarded as canonical by the Official Charts Company.
No	The single did not reach number one on the chart regarded as canonical at the time.
1–18	The number of weeks spent as a number-one single on a chart not regarded as canonical by the Official Charts Company.
No	The single did not reach number one on the listed chart (which was not regarded as canonical at the time).
*	One of the weeks as number-one single was spent jointly with another single and, for the purposes of sorting, is considered less than acts whose time at number one was outright.

The canonical sources referred to above are NME for number ones 1–97 and Record Retailer for number ones 97–265

Edit by chart considered the canonical source: NME • Record Retailer

No. (Note: According to The Official Charts Company and the canonical sources, chronologically, which number one it was.)	Artist	Single	NME (Note: NME is considered by The Official Charts Company as the canonical source for number-one singles from the charts' inception until 10 March 1960. The names, singles and duration of the number-ones are taken from The Official Charts Company and from NME.)	Record Mirror (Note: The names, singles and duration of the number-ones are from the Record Mirror.)	Melody Maker	Disc	Record Retailer (Note: Record Retailer is considered by The Official Charts Company as the canonical source for number-one singles from 10 March 1960 until 15 February 1969 when Retailer and the BBC jointly commissioned the British Market Research Bureau (BMRB) to compile the chart. When BMRB started compiling the chart is generally regarded as the beginning of an official chart. The names, singles and duration of the number-ones are taken from The Official Charts Company.)
No.	Artist	Single	Weeks at number one				
1	Al Martino	"Here in My Heart"	9	—	—	—	—
2	Jo Stafford	"You Belong to Me"	1	—	—	—	—
3	Kay Starr	"Comes A-Long A-Love"	1	—	—	—	—
4	Eddie Fisher	"Outside Of Heaven"	1	—	—	—	—
5	Perry Como	"Don't Let The Stars Get In Your Eyes"	5	—	—	—	—
6	Guy Mitchell	"She Wears Red Feathers"	4	—	—	—	—
7	The Stargazers	"Broken Wings"	1	—	—	—	—
8	Lita Roza	"(How Much Is) That Doggie in the Window?"	1	—	—	—	—
9	Frankie Laine	"I Believe"	18	—	—	—	—
10	Eddie Fisher	"I'm Walking Behind You"	1	—	—	—	—
11	Mantovani	"Song from Moulin Rouge"	1	—	—	—	—
12	Guy Mitchell	"Look At That Girl"	6	—	—	—	—
13	Frankie Laine	"Hey Joe"	2	—	—	—	—
14	David Whitfield	"Answer Me"	2*	—	—	—	—
15	Frankie Laine	"Answer Me"	8*	—	—	—	—
16	Eddie Calvert	"Oh Mein Papa"	9	—	—	—	—
17	The Stargazers	"I See the Moon"	9	—	—	—	—
18	Doris Day	"Secret Love"	9	—	—	—	—
19	Johnnie Ray	"Such a Night"	1	—	—	—	—
20	David Whitfield	"Cara Mia"	10	—	—	—	—
21	Kitty Kallen	"Little Things Mean a Lot"	1	—	—	—	—
22	Frank Sinatra	"Three Coins in the Fountain"	3	—	—	—	—
23	Don Cornell	"Hold My Hand"	5	—	—	—	—
24	Vera Lynn	"My Son, My Son"	2	—	—	—	—
25	Rosemary Clooney	"This Ole House"	1	—	—	—	—
26	Winifred Atwell	"Let's Have Another Party"	5	—	—	—	—
27	Dickie Valentine	"The Finger Of Suspicion"	3	—	—	—	—
28	Rosemary Clooney	"Mambo Italiano"	3	3	—	—	—
—	Dean Martin	"Naughty Lady of Shady Lane"	No	1	—	—	—
29	Ruby Murray	"Softly, Softly"	3	1	—	—	—
30	Tennessee Ernie Ford	"Give Me Your Word"	7	9	—	—	—
31	Perez "Prez" Prado and his Orchestra	"Cherry Pink (and Apple Blossom White)"	2	No	—	—	—
32	Tony Bennett	"Stranger in Paradise"	2	6	—	—	—
33	Eddie Calvert	"Cherry Pink (and Apple Blossom White)"	4	No	—	—	—
34	Jimmy Young	"Unchained Melody"	3	No	—	—	—
—	Al Hibbler	"Unchained Melody"	No	4	—	—	—
35	Alma Cogan	"Dreamboat"	2	2	—	—	—
36	Slim Whitman	"Rose Marie"	11	9	—	—	—
—	Frankie Laine	"Cool Water"	No	1	—	—	—
37	Jimmy Young	"The Man from Laramie"	4	5	—	—	—
38	Johnston Brothers	"Hernando's Hideaway"	2	No	—	—	—
39	Bill Haley & His Comets	"Rock Around the Clock"	5	8	—	—	—
40	Dickie Valentine	"Christmas Alphabet"	2	No	—	—	—
41	Tennessee Ernie Ford	"Sixteen Tons"	4	5	—	—	—
—	Lou Busch	"Zambesi"	No	2	—	—	—
42	Dean Martin	"Memories Are Made of This"	4	2	—	—	—
43	The Dream Weavers	"It's Almost Tomorrow"	3	3	3	—	—
44	Kay Starr with the Hugo Winterhalter Orchestra	"Rock And Roll Waltz"	1	No	No	—	—
45	Winifred Atwell	"The Poor People of Paris"	3	5	2	—	—
46	Ronnie Hilton	"No Other Love"	6	4	5	—	—
47	Pat Boone	"I'll Be Home"	5	6	5	—	—
48	Frankie Lymon and The Teenagers	"Why Do Fools Fall in Love"	3	3	5	—	—
49	Doris Day	"Whatever Will Be, Will Be (Que Sera, Sera)"	6	6	5	—	—
50	Anne Shelton	"Lay Down Your Arms"	4	4	5	—	—
51	Frankie Laine	"A Woman in Love"	4	3	3	—	—
52	Johnnie Ray	"Just Walking in the Rain"	7	7	9	—	—
53	Guy Mitchell	"Singing the Blues"	3*	3	2	—	—
54	Tommy Steele	"Singing the Blues"	1	1	No	—	—
55	Frankie Vaughan	"The Garden of Eden"	4*	3	4	—	—
56	Tab Hunter	"Young Love"	7	7	8	—	—
57	Lonnie Donegan	"Cumberland Gap"	5	4	4	—	—
58	Guy Mitchell	"Rock-a-Billy"	1	No	No	—	—
59	Andy Williams	"Butterfly"	2	5	4	—	—
60	Johnnie Ray	"Yes Tonight Josephine"	3	4	4	—	—
61	Lonnie Donegan	"Puttin' On the Style" / "Gamblin' Man"	2	1	No	—	—
62	Elvis Presley	"All Shook Up"	7	7	8	—	—
63	Paul Anka	"Diana"	9	8	8	—	—
64	The Crickets	"That'll Be the Day"	3	4	1	—	—
—	Elvis Presley	"Party"	No	No	2	—	—
65	Harry Belafonte	"Mary's Boy Child"	7	5	7	—	—
—	Johnny Otis Show	"Ma, He's Making Eyes At Me"	No	2	2*	—	—
66	Jerry Lee Lewis	"Great Balls of Fire"	2	1	2*	—	—
67	Elvis Presley	"Jailhouse Rock"	3	3	2	1*	—
68	Michael Holliday	"The Story of My Life"	2	2	2	3*	—
69	Perry Como	"Magic Moments"	8	7	7	8	—
70	Marvin Rainwater	"Whole Lotta Woman"	3	4	4	3	—
71	Connie Francis	"Who's Sorry Now"	6	6	6	6	—
72	Vic Damone	"On the Street Where You Live"	2*	No	No	No	—
73	The Everly Brothers	"All I Have to Do Is Dream" / "Claudette"	7*	9	9	8	—
74	The Kalin Twins	"When"	5	5	4	5	—
75	Connie Francis	"Carolina Moon" / "Stupid Cupid"	6	5	5	5	—
76	Tommy Edwards	"It's All in the Game"	3	No	No	No	—
—	The Everly Brothers	"Bird Dog"	No	3	3	2	—
77	Lord Rockingham's XI	"Hoots Mon"	3	4	3	8	—
78	Conway Twitty	"It's Only Make Believe"	5	4	7	3	—
79	Jane Morgan	"The Day the Rains Came"	1	No	No	No	—
80	Elvis Presley	"I Got Stung" / "One Night"	3	5	3	3	—
81	Shirley Bassey with Wally Stott & His Orchestra	"As I Love You"	4	No	1	3	—
82	The Platters	"Smoke Gets in Your Eyes"	1	5	4	3	—
83	Russ Conway	"Side Saddle"	4	2	3	3	—
84	Buddy Holly	"It Doesn't Matter Anymore"	3	2	5	4	—
85	Elvis Presley	"A Fool Such As I" / "I Need Your Love Tonight"	5	7	4	4	—
86	Russ Conway	"Roulette"	2	1	1	1	—
87	Bobby Darin	"Dream Lover"	4	5	5	5	—
88	Cliff Richard and the Drifters	"Living Doll"	6	4	5	5	—
89	Craig Douglas	"Only Sixteen"	4	7	6	5	—
90	Jerry Keller	"Here Comes Summer"	1	No	No	2	—
91	Bobby Darin	"Mack the Knife"	2	No	No	No	—
92	Cliff Richard and The Shadows	"Travellin' Light"	5	7	6	6	—
93	Adam Faith	"What Do You Want?"	3*	5	3	2	—
94	Emile Ford and the Checkmates	"What Do You Want to Make Those Eyes at Me For?"	6*	2	5	6	—
95	Michael Holliday	"Starry Eyed"	1	No	No	1	—
96	Anthony Newley	"Why"	4	6	6	5	—
97	Adam Faith	"Poor Me"	2	1	1	1	1
98	Johnny Preston	"Running Bear"	1	2	2	2	2
99	Lonnie Donegan	"My Old Man's a Dustman"	4	5	3	3	4
—	Elvis Presley	"Stuck on You" / "Fame and Fortune"	No	No	1	1	No
100	Anthony Newley	"Do You Mind?"	1	No	1	1	1
101	The Everly Brothers	"Cathy's Clown"	9	9	9	7	7
102	Eddie Cochran	"Three Steps to Heaven"	No	No	No	No	2
—	Connie Francis	"Mama"/"Robot Man"	No	No	No	2	No
103	Jimmy Jones	"Good Timin'"	3	4	3	2	3
104	Cliff Richard and The Shadows	"Please Don't Tease"	4	3	4	4	3
105	Johnny Kidd & The Pirates	"Shakin' All Over"	No	No	No	No	1
106	The Shadows	"Apache"	6	6	4	6	5
—	Elvis Presley	"A Mess of Blues"/"The Girl of My Best Friend"	No	No	1	No	No
107	Ricky Valance	"Tell Laura I Love Her"	2	2	2	3	3
108	Roy Orbison	"Only the Lonely (Know How I Feel)"	3	3	3	2	2
109	Elvis Presley	"It's Now or Never"	9	9	8	7	8
110	Cliff Richard and The Shadows	"I Love You"	No	No	2	3	2
111	Johnny Tillotson	"Poetry in Motion"	3	3	2	1	2
112	Elvis Presley	"Are You Lonesome Tonight?"	5	4	5	5	4
113	Petula Clark	"Sailor"	No	No	No	2	1
114	The Everly Brothers	"Walk Right Back"	3	4	3	2	3
115	Elvis Presley	"Wooden Heart"	3	4*	6	4	6
—	The Allisons	"Are You Sure?"	2	2	No	2	No
116	The Temperance Seven	"You're Driving Me Crazy"	1	2*	1	No	1
117	The Marcels	"Blue Moon"	2	2	2	3	2
118	Floyd Cramer	"On the Rebound"	No	No	No	No	1
119	Del Shannon	"Runaway"	4	2*	6	4	3
120	Elvis Presley	"Surrender"	4	5*	3	3	4
—	Cliff Richard and The Shadows	"A Girl Like You"	No	No	No	1	No
121	The Everly Brothers	"Temptation"	1	4	1	1	2
122	Eden Kane	"Well I Ask You"	2	1	1	1	1
123	Helen Shapiro	"You Don't Know"	4*	2	2	2	3
124	John Leyton	"Johnny Remember Me"	5*	5	6	7	4
125	Shirley Bassey	"Reach for the Stars" / "Climb Ev'ry Mountain"	No	No	No	No	1
—	Elvis Presley	"Wild in the Country"	1	No	No	No	No
126	The Shadows	"Kon-Tiki"	No	1	1	No	1
127	The Highwaymen	"Michael (Row the Boat)"	1	1	1	2	1
128	Helen Shapiro	"Walkin' Back to Happiness"	4	4	4	3	3
129	Elvis Presley	"His Latest Flame"	3	3	3	4	4
130	Frankie Vaughan	"Tower of Strength"	4*	4	3	4	3
—	Bobby Vee	"Take Good Care of My Baby"	1*	1	No	No	No
131	Danny Williams	"Moon River"	1	No	No	No	2
—	Acker Bilk	"Stranger on the Shore"*	1	1	2	1	No
132	Cliff Richard	"The Young Ones"	6	5	6	5	6
133	Elvis Presley	"Rock-A-Hula Baby" / "Can't Help Falling in Love"	No	4	4	3	4
—	Chubby Checker	"Let's Twist Again"	2	—	No	No	No
—	Kenny Ball and his Jazzmen	"March of the Siamese Children"	1	—	No	2	No
134	The Shadows	"Wonderful Land"	9	—	8	7	8
135	B. Bumble and the Stingers	"Nut Rocker"	1	—	1	1	1
136	Elvis Presley	"Good Luck Charm"	5	—	6	7	5
137	Mike Sarne with Wendy Richard	"Come Outside"	2	—	1	No	2
—	Joe Brown and the Bruvvers	"A Picture of You"	1	—	1	1	No
138	Ray Charles	"I Can't Stop Loving You"	1	—	1	1	2
139	Frank Ifield	"I Remember You"	8	—	8	5	7
—	Pat Boone	"Speedy Gonzales"	No	—	No	2	No
140	Elvis Presley	"She's Not You"	3	—	2	4	3
141	The Tornados	"Telstar"	5	—	6	5	5
142	Frank Ifield	"Lovesick Blues"	5	—	5	5	5
143	Elvis Presley	"Return to Sender"	2	—	1	2	3
144	Cliff Richard and The Shadows	"The Next Time" / "Bachelor Boy"	1	—	5	5	3
145	The Shadows	"Dance On!"	3	—	No	No	1
146	Jet Harris and Tony Meehan	"Diamonds"	4	—	4	2	3
147	Frank Ifield	"The Wayward Wind"	1	—	No	1	3
—	The Beatles	"Please Please Me"	2	—	2	2	No
148	Cliff Richard and The Shadows	"Summer Holiday"	3	—	3	3	3
149	The Shadows	"Foot Tapper"	1	—	1	1	1
150	Gerry & The Pacemakers	"How Do You Do It?"	3	—	3	4	3
151	The Beatles	"From Me to You"	6	—	6	5	7
—	Billy J. Kramer & The Dakotas	"Do You Want to Know a Secret"	2	—	1	1	No
152	Gerry & The Pacemakers	"I Like It"	4	—	4	5	4
153	Frank Ifield	"Confessin' (That I Love You)"	3	—	3	2	2
154	Elvis Presley	"(You're the) Devil in Disguise"	No	—	No	No	1
155	The Searchers	"Sweets for My Sweet"	3	—	2	3	2
156	Billy J. Kramer & The Dakotas	"Bad to Me"	2	—	2	2	3
157	The Beatles	"She Loves You"	6	—	7	5	6
158	Brian Poole and The Tremeloes	"Do You Love Me"	3	—	2	3	3
159	Gerry & The Pacemakers	"You'll Never Walk Alone"	4	—	4	5	4
160	The Beatles	"I Want to Hold Your Hand"	6	—	5	5	5
161	The Dave Clark Five	"Glad All Over"	2	—	3	2	2
—	The Swinging Blue Jeans	"Hippy Hippy Shake"	No	—	No	1	No
162	The Searchers	"Needles and Pins"	3	—	3	3	3
163	The Bachelors	"Diane"	No	—	No	No	1
164	Cilla Black	"Anyone Who Had a Heart"	4	—	4	3	2
—	The Dave Clark Five	"Bits and Pieces"	No	—	No	1	No
165	Billy J. Kramer & The Dakotas	"Little Children"	1	—	1	1	2
166	The Beatles	"Can't Buy Me Love"	4	—	3	3	3
167	Peter & Gordon	"A World Without Love"	2	—	2	2	2
168	The Searchers	"Don't Throw Your Love Away"	1	—	2	2	2
169	The Four Pennies	"Juliet"	2	—	2	2	1
170	Cilla Black	"You're My World (Il Mio Mondo)"	3	—	3	3	4
171	Roy Orbison	"It's Over"	2	—	2	2	2
172	The Animals	"House of the Rising Sun"	2	—	1	2	1
173	The Rolling Stones	"It's All Over Now"	No	—	1	No	1
174	The Beatles	"A Hard Day's Night"	4	—	4	4	3
175	Manfred Mann	"Do Wah Diddy Diddy"	2	—	2	2	2
176	The Honeycombs	"Have I the Right?"	2	—	3	3	2
177	The Kinks	"You Really Got Me"	1	—	1	No	2
178	Herman's Hermits	"I'm Into Something Good"	3	—	2	3	2
179	Roy Orbison	"Oh, Pretty Woman"	3	—	4	3	3
180	Sandie Shaw	"(There's) Always Something There to Remind Me"	2	—	1	2	3
181	The Supremes	"Baby Love"	1	—	3	2	2
182	The Rolling Stones	"Little Red Rooster"	2	—	No	1	1
183	The Beatles	"I Feel Fine"	6	—	6	6	5
184	Georgie Fame	"Yeh Yeh"	1	—	1	1	2
185	The Moody Blues	"Go Now"	2	—	1	2	1
186	The Righteous Brothers	"You've Lost That Lovin' Feelin'"	1	—	2	1	2
187	The Kinks	"Tired of Waiting for You"	1	—	1	1	1
188	The Seekers	"I'll Never Find Another You"	2	—	2	2	2
189	Tom Jones	"It's Not Unusual"	1	—	1	1	1
190	The Rolling Stones	"The Last Time"	4	—	3	4	3
191	Unit 4 + 2	"Concrete and Clay"	No	—	No	1	1
—	The Yardbirds	"For Your Love"	1	—	No	No	No
192	Cliff Richard	"The Minute You're Gone"	1	—	1	No	1
193	The Beatles	"Ticket to Ride"	5	—	5	4	3
194	Roger Miller	"King of the Road"	No	—	No	No	1
—	The Seekers	"A World of Our Own"	No	—	No	1	No
195	Jackie Trent	"Where Are You Now (My Love)"	1	—	1	1	1
196	Sandie Shaw	"Long Live Love"	2	—	2	3	3
197	Elvis Presley	"Crying in the Chapel"	2	—	3	2	2
—	The Everly Brothers	"The Price of Love"	1	—	No	No	No
198	The Hollies	"I'm Alive"	2	—	2	2	3
199	The Byrds	"Mr. Tambourine Man"	2	—	2	2	2
200	The Beatles	"Help!"	4	—	4	4	3
201	Sonny & Cher	"I Got You Babe"	1	—	2	2	2
202	The Rolling Stones	"(I Can't Get No) Satisfaction"	3	—	2	2	2
203	The Walker Brothers	"Make It Easy on Yourself"	No	—	1	1	1
204	Ken Dodd	"Tears"	6	—	5	5	5
205	The Rolling Stones	"Get Off of My Cloud"	3	—	2	3	3
—	Len Barry	"1-2-3"	1	—	No	No	No
206	The Seekers	"The Carnival Is Over"	1	—	4	2	3
207	The Beatles	"Day Tripper" / "We Can Work It Out"	5	—	4	5	5
208	The Spencer Davis Group	"Keep On Running"	3	—	2	2	1
209	The Overlanders	"Michelle"	1	—	2	2	3
210	Nancy Sinatra	"These Boots Are Made for Walkin'"	1	—	1	1	4
—	The Rolling Stones	"19th Nervous Breakdown"	3	—	3	3	No
—	Small Faces	"Sha-La-La-La-Lee"	No	—	1	1	No
—	The Hollies	"I Can't Let Go"	2	—	No	No	No
211	The Walker Brothers	"The Sun Ain't Gonna Shine Anymore"	4	—	3	4	4
212	The Spencer Davis Group	"Somebody Help Me"	1	—	2	1	2
213	Dusty Springfield	"You Don't Have to Say You Love Me"	2	—	2	2	1
214	Manfred Mann	"Pretty Flamingo"	3	—	3	3	3
215	The Rolling Stones	"Paint It, Black"	1	—	1	No	1
—	The Troggs	"Wild Thing"	No	—	No	1	No
216	Frank Sinatra	"Strangers in the Night"	3	—	2	3	3
217	The Beatles	"Paperback Writer"	2	—	4	2	2
218	The Kinks	"Sunny Afternoon"	2	—	No	2	2
219	Georgie Fame and the Blue Flames	"Getaway"	No	—	2	No	1
220	Chris Farlowe	"Out of Time"	2	—	1	2	1
221	The Troggs	"With a Girl Like You"	2	—	2	2	2
222	The Beatles	"Yellow Submarine" / "Eleanor Rigby"	4	—	3	3	4
223	Small Faces	"All or Nothing"	1	—	2	2	1
224	Jim Reeves	"Distant Drums"	5	—	2	4	5
—	The Who	"I'm a Boy"	No	—	2	No	No
225	Four Tops	"Reach Out I'll Be There"	3	—	3	4	3
226	The Beach Boys	"Good Vibrations"	2	—	3	2	2
227	Tom Jones	"Green, Green Grass of Home"	7	—	7	6	7
—	The Seekers	"Morningtown Ride"	No	—	No	1	No
228	The Monkees	"I'm a Believer"	4	—	4	4	4
229	Petula Clark	"This Is My Song"	2	—	1	2	2
230	Engelbert Humperdinck	"Release Me"	6	—	3	5	6
—	The Beatles	"Penny Lane" / "Strawberry Fields Forever"	No	—	3	No	No
—	Harry Secombe	"This Is My Song"	No	—	No	1	No
231	Nancy Sinatra and Frank Sinatra	"Somethin' Stupid"	1	—	2	2	2
232	Sandie Shaw	"Puppet on a String"	4	—	4	3	3
233	The Tremeloes	"Silence Is Golden"	3	—	3	3	3
234	Procol Harum	"A Whiter Shade of Pale"	5	—	5	6	6
—	The Monkees	"Alternate Title"	No	—	1	No	No
235	The Beatles	"All You Need Is Love"	4	—	3	2	3
236	Scott McKenzie	"San Francisco (Be Sure to Wear Flowers in Your Hair)"	4	—	3	3	4
237	Engelbert Humperdinck	"The Last Waltz"	6	—	7	—	5
238	Bee Gees	"Massachusetts"	3	—	3	—	4
239	The Foundations	"Baby Now That I've Found You"	3	—	2	—	2
240	Long John Baldry	"Let the Heartaches Begin"	1	—	2	—	2
241	The Beatles	"Hello, Goodbye"	6	—	5	—	7
—	The Beatles	Magical Mystery Tour (Note: This number-one record was not a single but a double extended play (EP) with six tracks. Due to the low popularity of EPs in the United States, an album of the same name was released containing the six EP tracks and five singles from 1967. The rules now require at most four distinct songs to be eligible for the UK Singles Chart.)	No	—	3	—	No
242	Georgie Fame	"The Ballad of Bonnie and Clyde"	1	—	1	—	1
243	Love Affair	"Everlasting Love"	3	—	3	—	2
244	Manfred Mann	"Mighty Quinn"	2	—	2	—	2
245	Esther and Abi Ofarim	"Cinderella Rockefella"	4	—	4	—	3
246	Dave Dee, Dozy, Beaky, Mick & Tich	"The Legend of Xanadu"	No	—	No	—	1
—	Tom Jones	"Delilah"	No	—	2	—	No
247	The Beatles	"Lady Madonna"	2	—	No	—	2
248	Cliff Richard	"Congratulations"	1	—	No	—	2
249	Louis Armstrong	"What a Wonderful World" / "Cabaret"	4	—	5	—	4
250	Gary Puckett & The Union Gap	"Young Girl"	5	—	4	—	4
251	The Rolling Stones	"Jumpin' Jack Flash"	2	—	3	—	2
252	The Equals	"Baby Come Back"	3	—	3	—	3
253	Des O'Connor	"I Pretend"	No	—	No	—	1
254	Tommy James and the Shondells	"Mony Mony"	4	—	5	—	3
255	Crazy World of Arthur Brown	"Fire"	No	—	No	—	1
256	The Beach Boys	"Do It Again"	No	—	No	—	1
—	Tom Jones	"Help Yourself"	2	—	No	—	No
—	Herb Alpert	"This Guy's in Love With You"	No	—	1	—	No
257	Bee Gees	"I've Gotta Get a Message to You"	1	—	1	—	1
258	The Beatles	"Hey Jude"	3	—	4	—	2
259	Mary Hopkin	"Those Were the Days"	5	—	5	—	6
260	Joe Cocker	"With a Little Help from My Friends"	1	—	1	—	1
261	Hugo Montenegro	"The Good, the Bad and the Ugly"	1	—	3	—	4
—	Barry Ryan	"Eloise"	2	—	1	—	No
262	The Scaffold	"Lily the Pink"	5	—	3	—	4
263	Marmalade	"Ob-La-Di, Ob-La-Da"	2	—	3	—	3
264	Fleetwood Mac	"Albatross"	3	—	2	—	1
265	The Move	"Blackberry Way"	1	—	1	—	1
