= List of UK charts and number-one singles (1952–1969)/Record Retailer =

No. (Note: According to The Official Charts Company and the canonical sources, chronologically, which number one it was.)	Artist	Single	NME (Note: NME is considered by The Official Charts Company as the canonical source for number-one singles from the charts' inception until 10 March 1960. The names, singles and duration of the number-ones are taken from The Official Charts Company and from NME.)	Record Mirror (Note: The names, singles and duration of the number-ones are from the Record Mirror.)	Melody Maker	Disc	Record Retailer (Note: Record Retailer is considered by The Official Charts Company as the canonical source for number-one singles from 10 March 1960 until 15 February 1969 when Retailer and the BBC jointly commissioned the British Music Record Bureau (BMRB) to compile the chart. When BMRB started compiling the chart is generally regarded as the beginning of an official chart. The names, singles and duration of the number-ones are taken from The Official Charts Company.)
No.	Artist	Single	Number-one				
97	Adam Faith	"Poor Me"	2	1	1	1	1
98	Johnny Preston	"Running Bear"	1	2	2	2	2
99	Lonnie Donegan	"My Old Man's a Dustman"	4	5	3	3	4
—	Elvis Presley	"Stuck on You" / "Fame and Fortune"	No	No	1	1	No
100	Anthony Newley	"Do You Mind?"	1	No	1	1	1
101	The Everly Brothers	"Cathy's Clown"	9	9	9	7	7
102	Eddie Cochran	"Three Steps to Heaven"	No	No	No	No	2
—	Connie Francis	"Mama"/"Robot Man"	No	No	No	2	No
103	Jimmy Jones	"Good Timin'"	3	4	3	2	3
104	Cliff Richard and The Shadows	"Please Don't Tease"	4	3	4	4	3
105	Johnny Kidd & The Pirates	"Shakin' All Over"	No	No	No	No	1
106	The Shadows	"Apache"	6	6	4	6	5
—	Elvis Presley	"A Mess of Blues"/"The Girl of My Best Friend"	No	No	1	No	No
107	Ricky Valance	"Tell Laura I Love Her"	2	2	2	3	3
108	Roy Orbison	"Only the Lonely (Know How I Feel)"	3	3	3	2	2
109	Elvis Presley	"It's Now or Never"	9	9	8	7	8
110	Cliff Richard and The Shadows	"I Love You"	No	No	2	3	2
111	Johnny Tillotson	"Poetry in Motion"	3	3	2	1	2
112	Elvis Presley	"Are You Lonesome Tonight?"	5	4	5	5	4
113	Petula Clark	"Sailor"	No	No	No	2	1
114	The Everly Brothers	"Walk Right Back"	3	4	3	2	3
115	Elvis Presley	"Wooden Heart"	3	4*	6	4	6
—	The Allisons	"Are You Sure?"	2	2	No	2	No
116	The Temperance Seven	"You're Driving Me Crazy"	1	2*	1	No	1
117	The Marcels	"Blue Moon"	2	2	2	3	2
118	Floyd Cramer	"On the Rebound"	No	No	No	No	1
119	Del Shannon	"Runaway"	4	2*	6	4	3
120	Elvis Presley	"Surrender"	4	5*	3	3	4
—	Cliff Richard and The Shadows	"A Girl Like You"	No	No	No	1	No
121	The Everly Brothers	"Temptation"	1	4	1	1	2
122	Eden Kane	"Well I Ask You"	2	1	1	1	1
123	Helen Shapiro	"You Don't Know"	4*	2	2	2	3
124	John Leyton	"Johnny Remember Me"	5*	5	6	7	4
125	Shirley Bassey	"Reach for the Stars" / "Climb Ev'ry Mountain"	No	No	No	No	1
—	Elvis Presley	"Wild in the Country"	1	No	No	No	No
126	The Shadows	"Kon-Tiki"	No	1	1	No	1
127	The Highwaymen	"Michael (Row the Boat)"	1	1	1	2	1
128	Helen Shapiro	"Walkin' Back to Happiness"	4	4	4	3	3
129	Elvis Presley	"His Latest Flame"	3	3	3	4	4
130	Frankie Vaughan	"Tower of Strength"	4*	4	3	4	3
—	Bobby Vee	"Take Good Care of My Baby"	1*	1	No	No	No
131	Danny Williams	"Moon River"	1	No	No	No	2
—	Acker Bilk	"Stranger on the Shore"*	1	1	2	1	No
132	Cliff Richard	"The Young Ones"	6	5	6	5	6
133	Elvis Presley	"Rock-A-Hula Baby" / "Can't Help Falling in Love"	No	4	4	3	4
—	Chubby Checker	"Let's Twist Again"	2	—	No	No	No
—	Kenny Ball and his Jazzmen	"March of the Siamese Children"	1	—	No	2	No
134	The Shadows	"Wonderful Land"	9	—	8	7	8
135	B. Bumble and the Stingers	"Nut Rocker"	1	—	1	1	1
136	Elvis Presley	"Good Luck Charm"	5	—	6	7	5
137	Mike Sarne with Wendy Richard	"Come Outside"	2	—	1	No	2
—	Joe Brown and the Bruvvers	"A Picture of You"	1	—	1	1	No
138	Ray Charles	"I Can't Stop Loving You"	1	—	1	1	2
139	Frank Ifield	"I Remember You"	8	—	8	5	7
—	Pat Boone	"Speedy Gonzales"	No	—	No	2	No
140	Elvis Presley	"She's Not You"	3	—	2	4	3
141	The Tornados	"Telstar"	5	—	6	5	5
142	Frank Ifield	"Lovesick Blues"	5	—	5	5	5
143	Elvis Presley	"Return to Sender"	2	—	1	2	3
144	Cliff Richard and The Shadows	"The Next Time" / "Bachelor Boy"	1	—	5	5	3
145	The Shadows	"Dance On!"	3	—	No	No	1
146	Jet Harris and Tony Meehan	"Diamonds"	4	—	4	2	3
147	Frank Ifield	"The Wayward Wind"	1	—	No	1	3
—	The Beatles	"Please Please Me"	2	—	2	2	No
148	Cliff Richard and The Shadows	"Summer Holiday"	3	—	3	3	3
149	The Shadows	"Foot Tapper"	1	—	1	1	1
150	Gerry & The Pacemakers	"How Do You Do It?"	3	—	3	4	3
151	The Beatles	"From Me to You"	6	—	6	5	7
—	Billy J. Kramer & The Dakotas	"Do You Want to Know a Secret"	2	—	1	1	No
152	Gerry & The Pacemakers	"I Like It"	4	—	4	5	4
153	Frank Ifield	"Confessin' (That I Love You)"	3	—	3	2	2
154	Elvis Presley	"(You're the) Devil in Disguise"	No	—	No	No	1
155	The Searchers	"Sweets for My Sweet"	3	—	2	3	2
156	Billy J. Kramer & The Dakotas	"Bad to Me"	2	—	2	2	3
157	The Beatles	"She Loves You"	6	—	7	5	6
158	Brian Poole and The Tremeloes	"Do You Love Me"	3	—	2	3	3
159	Gerry & The Pacemakers	"You'll Never Walk Alone"	4	—	4	5	4
160	The Beatles	"I Want to Hold Your Hand"	6	—	5	5	5
161	The Dave Clark Five	"Glad All Over"	2	—	3	2	2
—	The Swinging Blue Jeans	"Hippy Hippy Shake"	No	—	No	1	No
162	The Searchers	"Needles and Pins"	3	—	3	3	3
163	The Bachelors	"Diane"	No	—	No	No	1
164	Cilla Black	"Anyone Who Had a Heart"	4	—	4	3	2
—	The Dave Clark Five	"Bits and Pieces"	No	—	No	1	No
165	Billy J. Kramer & The Dakotas	"Little Children"	1	—	1	1	2
166	The Beatles	"Can't Buy Me Love"	4	—	3	3	3
167	Peter & Gordon	"A World Without Love"	2	—	2	2	2
168	The Searchers	"Don't Throw Your Love Away"	1	—	2	2	2
169	The Four Pennies	"Juliet"	2	—	2	2	1
170	Cilla Black	"You're My World (Il Mio Mondo)"	3	—	3	3	4
171	Roy Orbison	"It's Over"	2	—	2	2	2
172	The Animals	"House of the Rising Sun"	2	—	1	2	1
173	The Rolling Stones	"It's All Over Now"	No	—	1	No	1
174	The Beatles	"A Hard Day's Night"	4	—	4	4	3
175	Manfred Mann	"Do Wah Diddy Diddy"	2	—	2	2	2
176	The Honeycombs	"Have I the Right?"	2	—	3	3	2
177	The Kinks	"You Really Got Me"	1	—	1	No	2
178	Herman's Hermits	"I'm Into Something Good"	3	—	2	3	2
179	Roy Orbison	"Oh, Pretty Woman"	3	—	4	3	3
180	Sandie Shaw	"(There's) Always Something There to Remind Me"	2	—	1	2	3
181	The Supremes	"Baby Love"	1	—	3	2	2
182	The Rolling Stones	"Little Red Rooster"	2	—	No	1	1
183	The Beatles	"I Feel Fine"	6	—	6	6	5
184	Georgie Fame	"Yeh Yeh"	1	—	1	1	2
185	The Moody Blues	"Go Now"	2	—	1	2	1
186	The Righteous Brothers	"You've Lost That Lovin' Feelin'"	1	—	2	1	2
187	The Kinks	"Tired of Waiting for You"	1	—	1	1	1
188	The Seekers	"I'll Never Find Another You"	2	—	2	2	2
189	Tom Jones	"It's Not Unusual"	1	—	1	1	1
190	The Rolling Stones	"The Last Time"	4	—	3	4	3
191	Unit 4 + 2	"Concrete and Clay"	No	—	No	1	1
—	The Yardbirds	"For Your Love"	1	—	No	No	No
192	Cliff Richard	"The Minute You're Gone"	1	—	1	No	1
193	The Beatles	"Ticket to Ride"	5	—	5	4	3
194	Roger Miller	"King of the Road"	No	—	No	No	1
—	The Seekers	"A World of Our Own"	No	—	No	1	No
195	Jackie Trent	"Where Are You Now (My Love)"	1	—	1	1	1
196	Sandie Shaw	"Long Live Love"	2	—	2	3	3
197	Elvis Presley	"Crying in the Chapel"	2	—	3	2	2
—	The Everly Brothers	"The Price of Love"	1	—	No	No	No
198	The Hollies	"I'm Alive"	2	—	2	2	3
199	The Byrds	"Mr. Tambourine Man"	2	—	2	2	2
200	The Beatles	"Help!"	4	—	4	4	3
201	Sonny & Cher	"I Got You Babe"	1	—	2	2	2
202	The Rolling Stones	"(I Can't Get No) Satisfaction"	3	—	2	2	2
203	The Walker Brothers	"Make It Easy on Yourself"	No	—	1	1	1
204	Ken Dodd	"Tears"	6	—	5	5	5
205	The Rolling Stones	"Get Off of My Cloud"	3	—	2	3	3
—	Len Barry	"1-2-3"	1	—	No	No	No
206	The Seekers	"The Carnival Is Over"	1	—	4	2	3
207	The Beatles	"Day Tripper" / "We Can Work It Out"	5	—	4	5	5
208	The Spencer Davis Group	"Keep On Running"	3	—	2	2	1
209	The Overlanders	"Michelle"	1	—	2	2	3
210	Nancy Sinatra	"These Boots Are Made for Walkin'"	1	—	1	1	4
—	The Rolling Stones	"19th Nervous Breakdown"	3	—	3	3	No
—	Small Faces	"Sha-La-La-La-Lee"	No	—	1	1	No
—	The Hollies	"I Can't Let Go"	2	—	No	No	No
211	The Walker Brothers	"The Sun Ain't Gonna Shine Anymore"	4	—	3	4	4
212	The Spencer Davis Group	"Somebody Help Me"	1	—	2	1	2
213	Dusty Springfield	"You Don't Have to Say You Love Me"	2	—	2	2	1
214	Manfred Mann	"Pretty Flamingo"	3	—	3	3	3
215	The Rolling Stones	"Paint It, Black"	1	—	1	No	1
—	The Troggs	"Wild Thing"	No	—	No	1	No
216	Frank Sinatra	"Strangers in the Night"	3	—	2	3	3
217	The Beatles	"Paperback Writer"	2	—	4	2	2
218	The Kinks	"Sunny Afternoon"	2	—	No	2	2
219	Georgie Fame and the Blue Flames	"Getaway"	No	—	2	No	1
220	Chris Farlowe	"Out of Time"	2	—	1	2	1
221	The Troggs	"With a Girl Like You"	2	—	2	2	2
222	The Beatles	"Yellow Submarine" / "Eleanor Rigby"	4	—	3	3	4
223	Small Faces	"All or Nothing"	1	—	2	2	1
224	Jim Reeves	"Distant Drums"	5	—	2	4	5
—	The Who	"I'm a Boy"	No	—	2	No	No
225	Four Tops	"Reach Out I'll Be There"	3	—	3	4	3
226	The Beach Boys	"Good Vibrations"	2	—	3	2	2
227	Tom Jones	"Green, Green Grass of Home"	7	—	7	6	7
—	The Seekers	"Morningtown Ride"	No	—	No	1	No
228	The Monkees	"I'm a Believer"	4	—	4	4	4
229	Petula Clark	"This Is My Song"	2	—	1	2	2
230	Engelbert Humperdinck	"Release Me"	6	—	3	5	6
—	The Beatles	"Penny Lane" / "Strawberry Fields Forever"	No	—	3	No	No
—	Harry Secombe	"This Is My Song"	No	—	No	1	No
231	Nancy Sinatra and Frank Sinatra	"Somethin' Stupid"	1	—	2	2	2
232	Sandie Shaw	"Puppet on a String"	4	—	4	3	3
233	The Tremeloes	"Silence Is Golden"	3	—	3	3	3
234	Procol Harum	"A Whiter Shade of Pale"	5	—	5	6	6
—	The Monkees	"Alternate Title"	No	—	1	No	No
235	The Beatles	"All You Need Is Love"	4	—	3	2	3
236	Scott McKenzie	"San Francisco (Be Sure to Wear Flowers in Your Hair)"	4	—	3	3	4
237	Engelbert Humperdinck	"The Last Waltz"	6	—	7	—	5
238	Bee Gees	"Massachusetts"	3	—	3	—	4
239	The Foundations	"Baby Now That I've Found You"	3	—	2	—	2
240	Long John Baldry	"Let the Heartaches Begin"	1	—	2	—	2
241	The Beatles	"Hello, Goodbye"	6	—	5	—	7
—	The Beatles	Magical Mystery Tour (Note: This number-one record was not a single but a double extended play (EP) with six tracks. Due to the low popularity of EPs in the United States, an album of the same name was released containing the six EP tracks and five singles from 1967. The rules now require at most four distinct songs to be eligible for the UK Singles Chart.)	No	—	3	—	No
242	Georgie Fame	"The Ballad of Bonnie and Clyde"	1	—	1	—	1
243	Love Affair	"Everlasting Love"	3	—	3	—	2
244	Manfred Mann	"Mighty Quinn"	2	—	2	—	2
245	Esther and Abi Ofarim	"Cinderella Rockefella"	4	—	4	—	3
246	Dave Dee, Dozy, Beaky, Mick & Tich	"The Legend of Xanadu"	No	—	No	—	1
—	Tom Jones	"Delilah"	No	—	2	—	No
247	The Beatles	"Lady Madonna"	2	—	No	—	2
248	Cliff Richard	"Congratulations"	1	—	No	—	2
249	Louis Armstrong	"What a Wonderful World" / "Cabaret"	4	—	5	—	4
250	Gary Puckett & The Union Gap	"Young Girl"	5	—	4	—	4
251	The Rolling Stones	"Jumpin' Jack Flash"	2	—	3	—	2
252	The Equals	"Baby Come Back"	3	—	3	—	3
253	Des O'Connor	"I Pretend"	No	—	No	—	1
254	Tommy James and the Shondells	"Mony Mony"	4	—	5	—	3
255	Crazy World of Arthur Brown	"Fire"	No	—	No	—	1
256	The Beach Boys	"Do It Again"	No	—	No	—	1
—	Tom Jones	"Help Yourself"	2	—	No	—	No
—	Herb Alpert	"This Guy's in Love With You"	No	—	1	—	No
257	Bee Gees	"I've Gotta Get a Message to You"	1	—	1	—	1
258	The Beatles	"Hey Jude"	3	—	4	—	2
259	Mary Hopkin	"Those Were the Days"	5	—	5	—	6
260	Joe Cocker	"With a Little Help from My Friends"	1	—	1	—	1
261	Hugo Montenegro	"The Good, the Bad and the Ugly"	1	—	3	—	4
—	Barry Ryan	"Eloise"	2	—	1	—	No
262	The Scaffold	"Lily the Pink"	5	—	3	—	4
263	Marmalade	"Ob-La-Di, Ob-La-Da"	2	—	3	—	3
264	Fleetwood Mac	"Albatross"	3	—	2	—	1
265	The Move	"Blackberry Way"	1	—	1	—	1
