= List of Mersey Beat number-one singles =

This is a list of Mersey Beat number-one singles. Mersey Beat is a former British weekly pop music newspaper. It was founded initially as a regional bi-weekly publication on 13 July 1961. In 1963 it began compiling a Top 20 chart based on around 10 stores and became a national paper.

== History ==
The charts and paper became weekly on 24 April 1964 and, following an investment in September 1964 by Brian Epstein, expanded the chart and sample size to become the first publication to announce a Top 100 on 3 December 1964. On 6 March 1965 the paper was rebranded Music Echo and by 16 April 1966 the chart was no longer published—on 23 April 1966 the newspaper was incorporated into Disc which became Disc and Music Echo.

In the period when Mersey Beat published a chart there was no official singles chart; Record Retailer and the BBC jointly commissioned the British Market Research Bureau (BMRB) chart in February 1969. The first record chart in the United Kingdom was published in November 1952 by NME. The Official Charts Company and Guinness' British Hit Singles & Albums consider this the canonical source for the British singles chart before 10 March 1960 and, after that date, the Record Retailer chart. However, NME continued to compile their own chart and publications Disc and Melody Maker also published charts in this period. Being no universally accepted chart, the BBC used aggregated results of charts from these three publications (and Record Mirror prior to 1952) to compile their own Pick of the Pops chart.

Charts compiled by Mersey Beat had thirteen number-one singles that did not reach top spot in the Record Retailer chart; this included two singles from each of The Who and The Hollies. Notably, "19th Nervous Breakdown" reached number one on the Mersey Beat chart as well as Disc, NME, and Melody Maker charts. It topped the BBC's Pick of the Pops aggregated chart and was announced as number one on Top of the Pops; however, because it did not reach number one on the Record Retailer chart it is omitted from The Official Charts Company's canon.

== Number-one singles ==
Key
† – The song did not reach number one on the Record Retailer chart.
[nb #] – The song spent a week at number one where it shared the top spot with another song.

No.	Artist (Note: The names, singles, dates and duration of the number-ones are from the Mersey Beat.)	Single	Reached number one	Weeks at number one
1964
1	The Beatles	"Can't Buy Me Love"	24 April 1964	1
2	The Searchers	"Don't Throw Your Love Away"	1 May 1964	2
3	The Four Pennies	"Juliet"	15 May 1964	1
4	Cilla Black	"You're My World"	22 May 1964	5
5	The Hollies	"Here I Go Again" †	25 June 1964	1
6	The Animals	"House of the Rising Sun"	2 July 1964	1
7	The Beatles	Long Tall Sally † (Note: This number-one record was not a single but a four-track extended play (EP). Tracks 1, 3, and 4 are cover versions of Little Richard's "Long Tall Sally", Larry Williams' "Slow Down" and Carl Perkins' "Matchbox". The second track was entitled "I Call Your Name". Although the Mersey Beat's criteria for chart inclusion is not known or clearly defined, it was not until 1998 that the UK Singles Chart reduced the number of tracks allowed on a single from four to three.)	9 July 1964	1
8	The Rolling Stones	"It's All Over Now"	16 July 1964	1
9	The Beatles	"A Hard Day's Night"	23 July 1964	4
10	Manfred Mann	"Do Wah Diddy Diddy"	20 August 1964	3
11	The Kinks	"You Really Got Me"	10 September 1964	2
12	The Supremes	"Where Did Our Love Go" †	24 September 1964	1
13	Herman's Hermits	"I'm into Something Good"	1 October 1964	1
14	Roy Orbison	"Oh, Pretty Woman"	8 October 1964	6
15	The Kinks	"All Day and All of the Night"	19 November 1964	1
16	The Rolling Stones	"Little Red Rooster"	26 November 1964	1
17	The Beatles	"I Feel Fine"	3 December 1964	4
1965
18	Georgie Fame	"Yeh Yeh"	2 January 1965	2
19	Twinkle	"Terry" †	16 January 1965	1
20	The Moody Blues	"Go Now"	23 January 1965	2
21	The Righteous Brothers	"You've Lost That Lovin' Feelin'"	6 February 1965	2
22	The Kinks	"Tired of Waiting for You"	20 February 1965	1
23	The Seekers	"I'll Never Find Another You"	27 February 1965	2
24	The Rolling Stones	"The Last Time"	13 March 1965	4
25	Cliff Richard	"The Minute You're Gone"	10 April 1965	1
26	The Beatles	"Ticket to Ride"	17 April 1965	4
27	Roger Miller	"King of the Road"	15 May 1965	2
28	Jackie Trent	"Where Are You Now (My Love)"	29 May 1965	1
29	Sandie Shaw	"Long Live Love"	5 June 1965	1
30	The Everly Brothers	"The Price of Love" †	12 June 1965	2
31	The Who	"Anyway, Anyhow, Anywhere" †	26 June 1965	1
32	The Hollies	"I'm Alive"	3 July 1965	3
33	Gene Pitney	"Looking Through the Eyes of Love" †	10 July 1965	1
34	The Byrds	"Mr. Tambourine Man"	17 July 1965	2
35	The Beatles	"Help!"	31 July 1965	4
36	Sonny & Cher	"I Got You Babe"	28 August 1965	1
37	The Rolling Stones	"(I Can't Get No) Satisfaction"	4 September 1965	1
re	Sonny & Cher	"I Got You Babe"	11 September 1965	2 (Note: Both Sonny & Cher's "I Got You Babe" and The Rolling Stones' "(I Can't Get No) Satisfaction" were classified jointly as number one on 18 September 1965. In the week before Sonny & Cher had the number-one spot outright and the following week both were deplaced from the top spot by Ken Dodd's "Tears".)
re	The Rolling Stones	"(I Can't Get No) Satisfaction"	18 September 1965	1
38	Ken Dodd	"Tears"	25 September 1965	3
39	Manfred Mann	"If You Gotta Go, Go Now" †	16 October 1965	1
re	Ken Dodd	"Tears"	23 October 1965	2
40	The Fortunes	"Here It Comes Again" †	6 November 1965	1
41	The Rolling Stones	"Get Off of My Cloud"	13 November 1965	1
42	The Who	"My Generation" †	20 November 1965	2
43	The Seekers	"The Carnival Is Over"	4 December 1965	1
44	The Beatles	"Day Tripper" / "We Can Work It Out"	11 December 1965	5
1966
45	The Spencer Davis Group	"Keep on Running"	15 January 1966	3
46	The Overlanders	"Michelle"	5 February 1966	2
47	Nancy Sinatra	"These Boots Are Made for Walkin'"	19 February 1966	2
48	The Rolling Stones	"19th Nervous Breakdown" †	5 March 1966	1
49	Small Faces	"Sha-La-La-La-Lee" †	12 March 1966	1
50	The Hollies	"I Can't Let Go" †	19 March 1966	1
51	The Walker Brothers	"The Sun Ain't Gonna Shine Anymore"	26 March 1966	3
52	The Spencer Davis Group	"Somebody Help Me"	16 April 1966	1

- In April 1966, Mersey Beat was incorporated into Disc; see also List of Disc number-one singles.
