= List of Melody Maker number-one singles from 1956 to 1969 =

Melody Maker was a British weekly popular music newspaper, published between 1926 and 2000. It was the third publication, after the New Musical Express (in 1952) and the Record Mirror (in 1955), to start its own singles chart, effective 7 April 1956. Like NME, Melody Maker drew a sample of random record stores by phone. Its first chart drew from figures for 19 shops; during the 1950s, sample sizes ranged from around 14–33 shops, and on 30 July 1960 the phoning of record shops was supplemented with postal returns; the first chart to use this method sampled 38 stores from 110 returns. In its 9 February 1963 edition, Melody Maker disclosed that it received chart returns from 245 retailers and that its chart was audited by auditors supplied by Middlesex County Council. When Disc & Music Echo (which at that point was published by the same company) began publishing Melody Maker's charts after 26 August 1967 upon discontinuing its own chart the week before, the latter expanded their sample pool to 282. After Record Retailer and the BBC contracted with the British Market Research Bureau (BMRB) to compile their singles and album charts in 1969, Melody Maker (and NME) gradually reduced their respective sample pools to the point where, by the next decade, each drew from 100 stores. The chart itself was originally a Top 20, extended to a Top 30 effective 14 April 1962, and Top 50 on 15 September 1962. After 1 April 1967, Melody Maker reverted to a Top 30 chart.

Record charts in the United Kingdom began on 14 November 1952 when NME imitated an idea started in American Billboard magazine compiled their own hit parade. Until 15 February 1969, when the British Market Research Bureau (BMRB) chart was established, many periodicals compiled their own charts. During this time the BBC used aggregated results of the prominent NME, Melody Maker, Disc, Record Mirror and, later, Record Retailer charts to compile their Pick of the Pops chart. Prior to 1969 there was no universally accepted source or "official" singles chart; however, the Official Charts Company and Guinness' British Hit Singles & Albums regard the canonical sources for this period as NME before 10 March 1960 and Record Retailer from then until the BMRB took over in 1969. Although Record Retailer is now the most predominantly used source for charting music in the 1960s, NME had the biggest circulation of charts in the decade and was more widely followed. After the BMRB was formed, the NME continued compiling its own chart up until 14 May 1988.

Elvis Presley had the first "non-canonical" number-one in the history of the Melody Maker chart when his 1957 single "Party" reached the top, but couldn't get past number two on the NME chart which, prior to 10 March 1960, was the "canonical" chart source as determined by the Official Charts Company. Between then and 1969, Melody Maker had a total of twenty number ones that did not reach number one on the NME chart before 1960, Record Retailer from then to 15 February 1969, and the British Market Research Bureau (BMRB) after that date. Of that total, seven also failed to top the Record Mirror (pre-1962), NME (post-1960) or Disc charts. Two were by The Beatles, whose 1967 hit "Penny Lane" / "Strawberry Fields Forever" and EP of Magical Mystery Tour only reached number one in Melody Maker; conversely, their "Lady Madonna" made the top of all charts but Melody Maker, where it got no higher than number two.

== Number-one singles ==
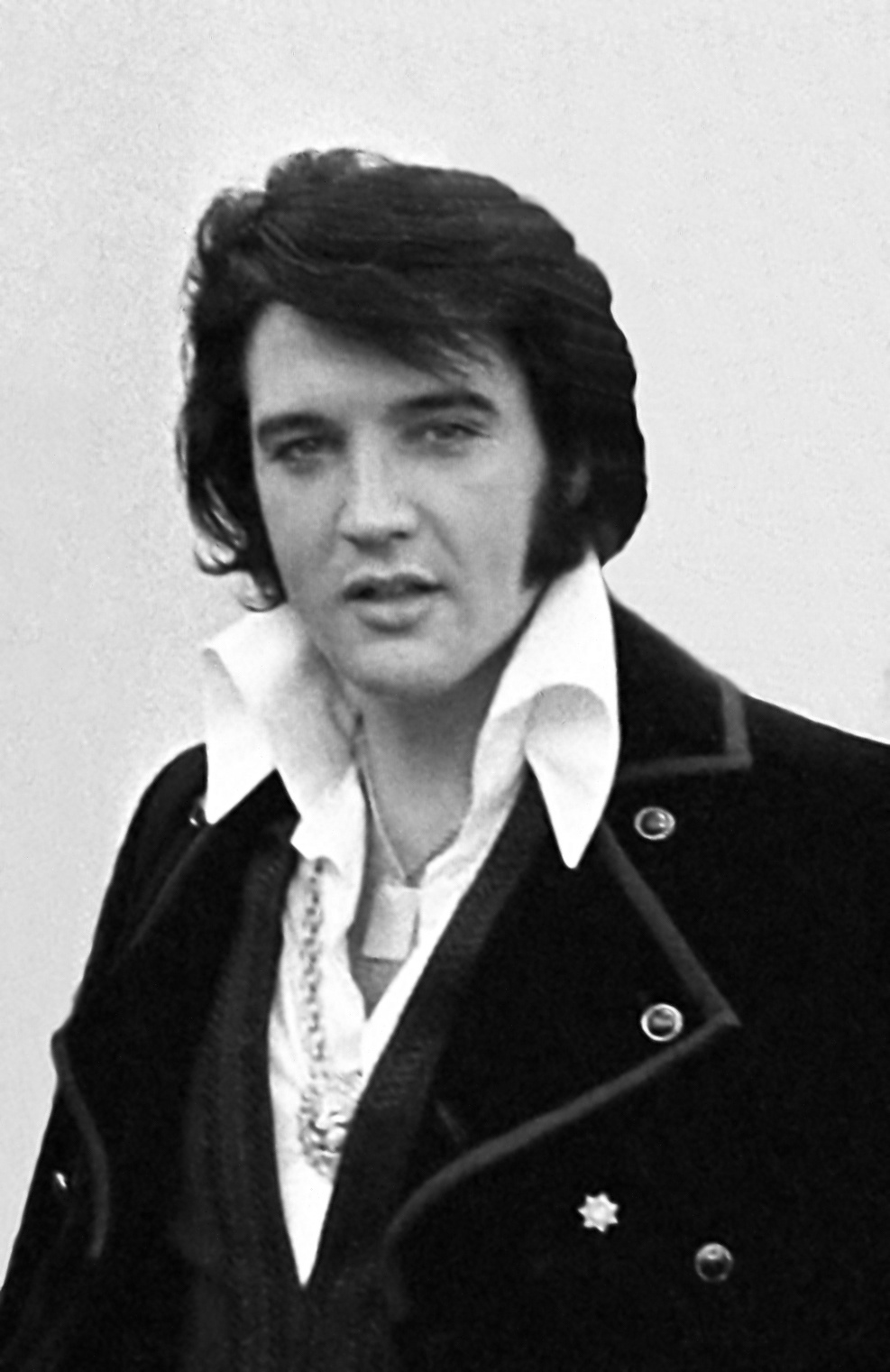
Elvis Presley had seventeen number-one singles on the Melody Maker chart from 1956–1969, including four not recognised by the Official Charts Company.

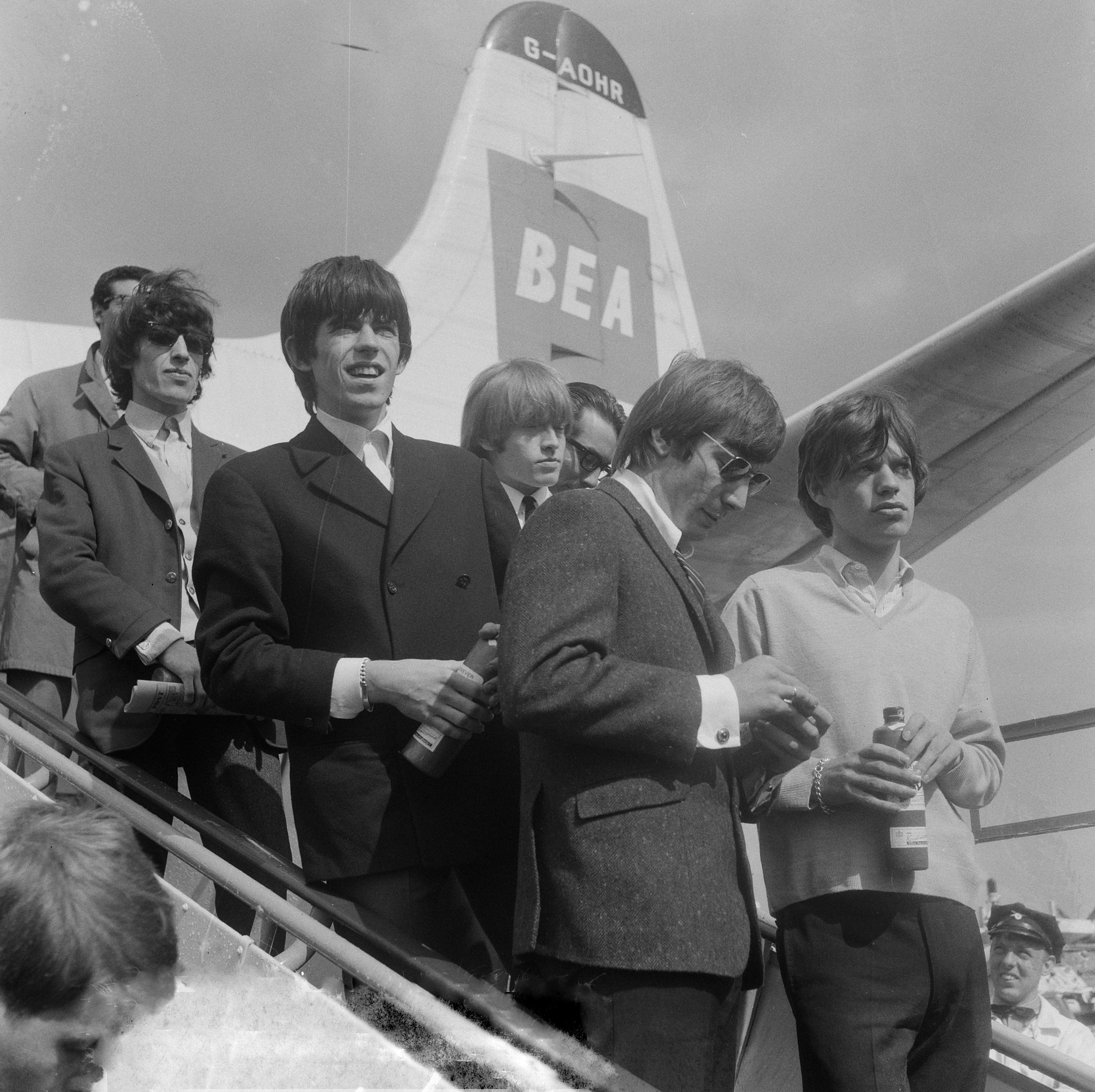
Melody Maker was one of three charts where The Rolling Stones' "19th Nervous Breakdown" made number one, but is not recognised by the Official Charts Company.

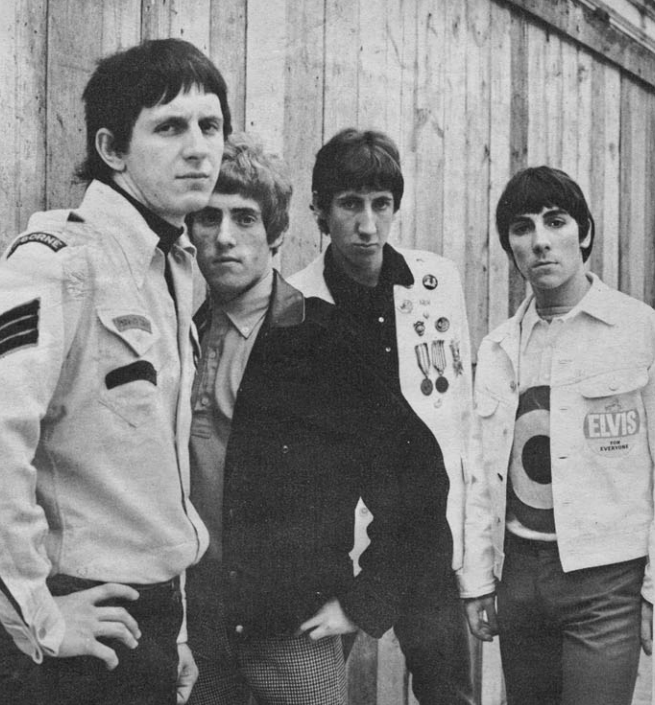
The Who's only UK number-one single was on the Melody Maker chart with "I'm a Boy."

Key
†	The song did not reach number on the NME (1952–1960) or Record Retailer (1960–1969) charts which are considered by the Official Charts Company as the canonical sources until 15 February 1969.
‡	The song did not reach number one on the BMRB chart which is considered as the official chart after 15 February 1969.
[nb #]	The song spent a week at number one, where it shared the top spot with another song.

No.	Artist (Note: The names, singles, week-ending dates and duration at number one are from Melody Maker."Melody Maker 1960's (and 50's) singles charts". UKMix.)	Single	Reached number one	Weeks at number one
1956
1	The Dream Weavers	"It's Almost Tomorrow"	31 March 1956	4 (Note: The first published Melody Maker chart of 7 April 1956 indicated this number one also had been number one the prior week before the chart was introduced. Therefore, the 31 March date and weeks on chart are listed retrospectively.)
2	Winifred Atwell	"The Poor People of Paris"	28 April 1956	2
3	Ronnie Hilton	"No Other Love"	12 May 1956	5
4	Pat Boone	"I'll Be Home"	16 June 1956	5
5	Frankie Lymon and The Teenagers	"Why Do Fools Fall in Love"	21 July 1956	3
6	Doris Day	"Whatever Will Be, Will Be"	11 August 1956	1
re	Frankie Lymon and The Teenagers	"Why Do Fools Fall in Love"	18 August 1956	2
re	Doris Day	"Whatever Will Be, Will Be"	1 September 1956	3
7	Anne Shelton	"Lay Down Your Arms"	22 September 1956	4
8	Frankie Laine	"A Woman in Love"	20 October 1956	3
9	Johnnie Ray	"Just Walking in the Rain"	10 November 1956	9
1957
10	Guy Mitchell	"Singing the Blues"	12 January 1957	2
11	Frankie Vaughan	"The Garden of Eden"	26 January 1957	4
12	Tab Hunter	"Young Love"	23 February 1957	8
13	Lonnie Donegan	"Cumberland Gap"	20 April 1957	4
14	Andy Williams	"Butterfly"	18 May 1957	4
15	Johnnie Ray	"Yes Tonight Josephine"	15 June 1957	4
16	Elvis Presley	"All Shook Up"	13 July 1957	8
17	Paul Anka	"Diana"	7 September 1957	8
18	Elvis Presley	"Party" †	2 November 1957	1
19	The Crickets	"That'll Be the Day"	9 November 1957	1
re	Elvis Presley	"Party" †	16 November 1957	1
20	Harry Belafonte	"Mary's Boy Child"	23 November 1957	7
1958
21	Johnny Otis Show	"Ma He's Making Eyes at Me" †	11 January 1958	1 (Note: Johnny Otis Show's "Ma He's Making Eyes at Me" and Jerry Lee Lewis' "Great Balls of Fire" were classified jointly as number one on 18 January 1958. The following week, "Great Balls of Fire" claimed the number-one spot outright.)
22	Jerry Lee Lewis	"Great Balls of Fire"	18 January 1958	2
23	Elvis Presley	"Jailhouse Rock"	1 February 1958	2
24	Michael Holliday	"The Story of My Life"	15 February 1958	2
25	Perry Como	"Magic Moments" / "Catch a Falling Star"	1 March 1958	7
26	Marvin Rainwater	"Whole Lotta Woman"	19 April 1958	4
27	Connie Francis	"Who's Sorry Now"	17 May 1958	6
28	The Everly Brothers	"All I Have to Do Is Dream"	28 June 1958	9
29	The Kalin Twins	"When"	30 August 1958	4
30	Connie Francis	"Stupid Cupid" / "Carolina Moon"	27 September 1958	5
31	The Everly Brothers	"Bird Dog" †	1 November 1958	3
32	Lord Rockingham's XI	"Hoots Mon"	22 November 1958	3
33	Conway Twitty	"It's Only Make Believe"	13 December 1958	7
1959
34	Elvis Presley	"I Got Stung" / "One Night"	31 January 1959	3
35	Shirley Bassey with Wally Stott & His Orchestra	"As I Love You"	21 February 1959	1
36	The Platters	"Smoke Gets in Your Eyes"	28 February 1959	4
37	Russ Conway	"Side Saddle"	28 March 1959	3
38	Buddy Holly	"It Doesn't Matter Any More"	18 April 1959	5
39	Elvis Presley	"A Fool Such As I" / "I Need Your Love Tonight"	23 May 1959	4
40	Russ Conway	"Roulette"	20 June 1959	1
41	Bobby Darin	"Dream Lover"	27 June 1959	5 (Note: Due to a newspaper strike, Melody Maker was not published from 27 June to 8 August 1959; however, the chart details were released retrospectively.)
42	Cliff Richard	"Living Doll"	1 August 1959	5
43	Craig Douglas	"Only Sixteen"	5 September 1959	6
44	Cliff Richard	"Travellin' Light"	17 October 1959	7
45	Emile Ford	"What Do You Want to Make Those Eyes at Me For?"	5 December 1959	1
46	Adam Faith	"What Do You Want"	12 December 1959	3
1960
re	Emile Ford	"What Do You Want to Make Those Eyes at Me For?"	2 January 1960	4
47	Anthony Newley	"Why"	30 January 1960	6
48	Adam Faith	"Poor Me"	12 March 1960	1
49	Johnny Preston	"Running Bear"	19 March 1960	2
50	Lonnie Donegan	"My Old Man's a Dustman"	2 April 1960	2
51	Elvis Presley	"Stuck on You" †	16 April 1960	1
re	Lonnie Donegan	"My Old Man's a Dustman"	23 April 1960	1
52	Anthony Newley	"Do You Mind"	30 April 1960	1
53	The Everly Brothers	"Cathy's Clown"	7 May 1960	9
54	Jimmy Jones	"Good Timin'"	9 July 1960	3
55	Cliff Richard and The Shadows	"Please Don't Tease"	30 July 1960	4
56	The Shadows	"Apache"	27 August 1960	4
57	Elvis Presley	"A Mess of Blues" / "The Girl of My Best Friend" †	24 September 1960	1
58	Ricky Valance	"Tell Laura I Love Her"	1 October 1960	2
59	Roy Orbison	"Only the Lonely"	15 October 1960	3
60	Elvis Presley	"It's Now or Never"	5 November 1960	8
61	Cliff Richard and The Shadows	"I Love You"	31 December 1960	1
1961
62	Johnny Tillotson	"Poetry in Motion"	7 January 1961	3
63	Elvis Presley	"Are You Lonesome Tonight"	28 January 1961	5
64	The Everly Brothers	"Walk Right Back"	4 March 1961	3
65	Elvis Presley	"Wooden Heart"	25 March 1961	6
66	The Temperance Seven	"You're Driving Me Crazy"	6 May 1961	1
67	The Marcels	"Blue Moon"	13 May 1961	2
68	Del Shannon	"Runaway"	27 May 1961	1
69	Elvis Presley	"Surrender"	3 June 1961	3
re	Del Shannon	"Runaway"	24 June 1961	5
70	The Everly Brothers	"Temptation"	29 July 1961	1
71	Eden Kane	"Well I Ask You"	5 August 1961	2
72	Helen Shapiro	"You Don't Know"	12 August 1961	2
73	John Leyton	"Johnny Remember Me"	26 August 1961	6
74	The Shadows	"Kon-Tiki"	7 October 1961	1
75	The Highwaymen	"Michael – Row the Boat"	14 October 1961	1
76	Helen Shapiro	"Walking Back to Happiness"	21 October 1961	4
77	Elvis Presley	"His Latest Flame"	18 November 1961	3
78	Frankie Vaughan	"Tower of Strength"	1 December 1961	3
79	Acker Bilk	"Stranger on the Shore" †	30 December 1961	2
1962
80	Cliff Richard	"The Young Ones"	13 January 1962	6
81	Elvis Presley	"Rock-A-Hula Baby" / "Can't Help Falling in Love"	24 February 1962	4
82	The Shadows	"Wonderful Land"	24 March 1962	8
83	B. Bumble and the Stingers	"Nut Rocker"	19 May 1962	1
84	Elvis Presley	"Good Luck Charm"	26 May 1962	6
85	Mike Sarne	"Come Outside"	7 July 1962	1
86	Joe Brown	"A Picture of You" †	14 July 1962	1
87	Ray Charles	"I Can't Stop Loving You"	21 July 1962	1
88	Frank Ifield	"I Remember You"	28 July 1962	8
89	Elvis Presley	"She's Not You"	22 September 1962	2
90	The Tornados	"Telstar"	6 October 1962	6
91	Frank Ifield	"Lovesick Blues"	17 November 1962	5
92	Elvis Presley	"Return to Sender"	22 December 1962	2
1963
93	Cliff Richard and The Shadows	"The Next Time" / "Bachelor Boy"	5 January 1963	4
94	Jet Harris and Tony Meehan	"Diamonds"	2 February 1963	4
95	The Beatles	"Please Please Me" †	2 March 1963	2
96	Cliff Richard and The Shadows	"Summer Holiday"	16 March 1963	3
97	The Shadows	"Foot Tapper"	6 April 1963	1
98	Gerry & The Pacemakers	"How Do You Do It?"	13 April 1963	3
99	The Beatles	"From Me to You"	4 May 1963	6
100	Billy J. Kramer & The Dakotas	"Do You Want to Know a Secret" †	15 June 1963	1
101	Gerry & The Pacemakers	"I Like It"	22 June 1963	4
102	Frank Ifield	"I'm Confessin'"	20 July 1963	3
103	The Searchers	"Sweets for My Sweet"	10 August 1963	2
104	Billy J. Kramer & The Dakotas	"Bad to Me"	24 August 1963	2
105	The Beatles	"She Loves You"	7 September 1963	5
106	Brian Poole and The Tremeloes	"Do You Love Me?"	12 October 1963	2
107	Gerry & The Pacemakers	"You'll Never Walk Alone"	26 October 1963	4
re	The Beatles	"She Loves You"	23 November 1963	2
108	The Beatles	"I Want to Hold Your Hand"	7 December 1963	5
1964
109	The Dave Clark Five	"Glad All Over"	11 January 1964	3
110	The Searchers	"Needles and Pins"	1 February 1964	3
111	Cilla Black	"Anyone Who Had a Heart"	22 February 1964	4
112	Billy J. Kramer and The Dakotas	"Little Children"	21 March 1964	1
113	The Beatles	"Can't Buy Me Love"	28 March 1964	3
114	Peter & Gordon	"A World Without Love"	18 April 1964	2
115	The Searchers	"Don't Throw Your Love Away"	2 May 1964	2
116	The Four Pennies	"Juliet"	16 May 1964	2
117	Cilla Black	"You're My World (Il Mio Mondo)"	30 May 1964	3
118	Roy Orbison	"It's Over"	20 June 1964	2
119	The Animals	"House of the Rising Sun"	4 July 1964	1
120	The Rolling Stones	"It's All Over Now"	11 July 1964	1
121	The Beatles	"A Hard Day's Night"	18 July 1964	4
122	Manfred Mann	"Do Wah Diddy Diddy"	15 August 1964	2
123	The Honeycombs	"Have I the Right?"	29 August 1964	3
124	The Kinks	"You Really Got Me"	19 September 1964	1
125	Herman's Hermits	"I'm Into Something Good"	26 September 1964	2
126	Roy Orbison	"Oh, Pretty Woman"	10 October 1964	3
127	Sandie Shaw	"(There's) Always Something There to Remind Me"	31 October 1964	1
re	Roy Orbison	"Oh, Pretty Woman"	7 November 1964	1
128	The Supremes	"Baby Love"	14 November 1964	3
129	The Beatles	"I Feel Fine"	5 December 1964	6
1965
130	Georgie Fame	"Yeh Yeh"	16 January 1965	1
131	The Moody Blues	"Go Now"	23 January 1965	1
132	The Righteous Brothers	"You've Lost That Lovin' Feelin'"	30 January 1965	2
133	The Kinks	"Tired of Waiting for You"	13 February 1965	1
134	The Seekers	"I'll Never Find Another You"	20 February 1965	2
135	Tom Jones	"It's Not Unusual"	6 March 1965	1
136	The Rolling Stones	"The Last Time"	13 March 1965	4
137	Cliff Richard	"The Minute You're Gone"	10 April 1965	1
138	The Beatles	"Ticket to Ride"	17 April 1965	5
139	Jackie Trent	"Where Are You Now?"	22 May 1965	1
140	Sandie Shaw	"Long Live Love"	29 May 1965	2
141	Elvis Presley	"Crying in the Chapel"	12 June 1965	3
142	The Hollies	"I'm Alive"	3 July 1965	2
143	The Byrds	"Mr. Tambourine Man"	17 July 1965	2
144	The Beatles	"Help!"	31 July 1965	4
145	Sonny & Cher	"I Got You Babe"	28 August 1965	2
146	The Rolling Stones	"(I Can't Get No) Satisfaction"	11 September 1965	2
147	The Walker Brothers	"Make It Easy on Yourself"	25 September 1965	1
148	Ken Dodd	"Tears"	2 October 1965	5
149	The Rolling Stones	"Get Off My Cloud"	6 November 1965	2
150	The Seekers	"The Carnival Is Over"	20 November 1965	4
151	The Beatles	"Day Tripper" / "We Can Work It Out"	18 December 1965	4
1966
152	The Spencer Davis Group	"Keep On Running"	15 January 1966	2
153	The Overlanders	"Michelle"	29 January 1966	2
154	Nancy Sinatra	"These Boots Are Made for Walkin'"	12 February 1966	1
155	The Rolling Stones	"19th Nervous Breakdown" †	19 February 1966	3
156	Small Faces	"Sha-La-La-La-Lee" †	12 March 1966	1
157	The Walker Brothers	"The Sun Ain't Gonna Shine Anymore"	19 March 1966	3
158	The Spencer Davis Group	"Somebody Help Me"	9 April 1966	2
159	Dusty Springfield	"You Don't Have to Say You Love Me"	23 April 1966	2
160	Manfred Mann	"Pretty Flamingo"	7 May 1966	3
161	The Rolling Stones	"Paint It Black"	28 May 1966	1
162	Frank Sinatra	"Strangers in the Night"	4 June 1966	2
163	The Beatles	"Paperback Writer"	18 June 1966	4
164	Georgie Fame and the Blue Flames	"Getaway"	16 July 1966	2
165	Chris Farlowe	"Out of Time"	30 July 1966	1
166	The Troggs	"With a Girl Like You"	6 August 1966	2
167	The Beatles	"Yellow Submarine" / "Eleanor Rigby"	20 August 1966	3
168	Small Faces	"All or Nothing"	10 September 1966	2
169	Jim Reeves	"Distant Drums"	24 September 1966	2
170	The Who	"I'm a Boy" †	8 October 1966	2
171	Four Tops	"Reach Out I'll Be There"	22 October 1966	3
172	The Beach Boys	"Good Vibrations"	12 November 1966	3
173	Tom Jones	"Green, Green Grass of Home"	3 December 1966	7
1967
174	The Monkees	"I'm a Believer"	21 January 1967	4
175	Petula Clark	"This Is My Song"	18 February 1967	1
176	Engelbert Humperdinck	"Release Me"	25 February 1967	1
177	The Beatles	"Penny Lane" / "Strawberry Fields Forever" †	4 March 1967	3
re	Engelbert Humperdinck	"Release Me"	25 March 1967	2
178	Nancy Sinatra and Frank Sinatra	"Somethin' Stupid"	8 April 1967	2
179	Sandie Shaw	"Puppet on a String"	22 April 1967	4
180	The Tremeloes	"Silence Is Golden"	20 May 1967	3
181	Procol Harum	"A Whiter Shade of Pale"	10 June 1967	5
182	The Monkees	"Alternate Title" †	15 July 1967	1
183	The Beatles	"All You Need Is Love"	22 July 1967	3
184	Scott McKenzie	"San Francisco"	12 August 1967	3
185	Engelbert Humperdinck	"The Last Waltz"	2 September 1967	7
186	Bee Gees	"Massachusetts"	21 October 1967	3
187	The Foundations	"Baby Now That I've Found You"	11 November 1967	2
188	Long John Baldry	"Let the Heartaches Begin"	25 November 1967	2
189	The Beatles	"Hello Goodbye"	9 December 1967	5
1968
190	The Beatles	Magical Mystery Tour † (Note: This number-one record was not a single but a double extended play (EP) with six tracks. Due to the low popularity of EPs in the United States, an album of the same name was released containing the six EP tracks and five singles from 1967. The rules now require at most four distinct songs to be eligible for the UK Singles Chart.)	13 January 1968	1
191	Georgie Fame	"The Ballad of Bonnie and Clyde"	20 January 1968	1
192	Love Affair	"Everlasting Love"	27 January 1968	3
193	Manfred Mann	"Mighty Quinn"	17 February 1968	2
194	Esther and Abi Ofarim	"Cinderella Rockefella"	2 March 1968	4
195	Tom Jones	"Delilah" †	30 March 1968	2
196	Louis Armstrong	"What a Wonderful World"	13 April 1968	5
197	Gary Puckett & The Union Gap	"Young Girl"	18 May 1968	4
198	The Rolling Stones	"Jumpin' Jack Flash"	15 June 1968	3
199	The Equals	"Baby Come Back"	6 July 1968	3
200	Tommy James and the Shondells	"Mony Mony"	27 July 1968	5
201	Herb Alpert	"This Guy's in Love With You" †	31 August 1968	1
202	The Beatles	"Hey Jude"	7 September 1968	4
203	Mary Hopkin	"Those Were the Days"	5 October 1968	5
204	Joe Cocker	"With a Little Help from My Friends"	9 November 1968	1
205	Barry Ryan	"Eloise" †	16 November 1968	1
206	Hugo Montenegro	"The Good, the Bad and the Ugly"	23 November 1968	3
207	The Scaffold	"Lily the Pink"	14 December 1968	4
1969
208	Marmalade	"Ob-La-Di, Ob-La-Da"	11 January 1969	3
209	Fleetwood Mac	"Albatross"	1 February 1969	2
210	The Move	"Blackberry Way"	15 February 1969	1
211	Amen Corner	"Half as Nice"	22 February 1969	2
212	Peter Sarstedt	"Where Do You Go To (My Lovely)?"	8 March 1969	4
213	Marvin Gaye	"I Heard It Through the Grapevine"	5 April 1969	3
214	Desmond Dekker & The Aces	"Israelites"	26 April 1969	1
215	The Beatles with Billy Preston	"Get Back"	3 May 1969	5
216	Tommy Roe	"Dizzy"	7 June 1969	2
217	The Beatles	"The Ballad of John and Yoko"	21 June 1969	3
218	Thunderclap Newman	"Something in the Air"	12 July 1969	1
219	Elvis Presley	"In the Ghetto" ‡	19 July 1969	1
220	The Rolling Stones	"Honky Tonk Women"	26 July 1969	5
221	Zager and Evans	"In the Year 2525"	30 August 1969	3
222	Creedence Clearwater Revival	"Bad Moon Rising"	20 September 1969	3
223	Bobbie Gentry	"I'll Never Fall in Love Again"	11 October 1969	3
224	The Archies	"Sugar, Sugar"	1 November 1969	6
225	Stevie Wonder	"Yester-Me, Yester-You, Yesterday" ‡	13 December 1969	1
226	Rolf Harris	"Two Little Boys"	20 December 1969	6
