= List of Disc number-one singles =

Disc (known from 1964 to 1966 as Disc Weekly, and from 1966 until its demise as Disc and Music Echo) was a British weekly pop music newspaper, published between 1958 and 1975. From its launch until 1967, Disc compiled its own record chart, the third (following New Musical Express, the Record Mirror, and Melody Maker with which it competed). Disc initially compiled its chart from 25 random phone calls to dealers across the United Kingdom, in a manner similar to two of its rivals. The first chart, published in its premiere issue of 8 February 1958, saw "Jailhouse Rock" by Elvis Presley tied with "The Story of My Life" by Michael Holliday for the number-one spot.

At the outset, Disc's chart was a Top Twenty, compiled by phone from 25 random dealers' returns all over the UK. The chart expanded to a Top 30 on 6 October 1962; between 23 April 1966 and 25 March 1967, the chart was Top 50 before reverting to a Top 30 on 1 April. By 1962, Disc's phone sample pool was 50, expanded to 80–100 by 1964 before dropping to a 30-50 pool toward the end of its run as an independently compiled chart. On 19 August 1967, the paper stopped compiling its own chart (its last number-one single being "San Francisco (Be Sure to Wear Flowers in Your Hair)" by Scott McKenzie) and started publishing Melody Maker's Top 30 chart.

Record charts in the UK began life on 14 November 1952, when NME imitated an idea started in American Billboard magazine and began compiling a hit parade. Prior to 15 February 1969, when the British Market Research Bureau chart was established, there had been no universally accepted chart. During this time the BBC used aggregated results of charts from the Mirror and other sources to compile the Pick of the Pops chart. However, according to the Official Charts Company and Guinness' British Hit Singles & Albums, the NME is considered the official British singles chart before 10 March 1960. After that date and until 1969, a chart compiled by Record Retailer is considered the official chart.

The first number-one record on the Disc chart not to have reached the top of the NME chart was "Bird Dog" by The Everly Brothers. From then until the end of Disc's independently compiled chart, they would have an additional eighteen number ones that are not recognised as number one by the Official Charts Company, the last of which was Harry Secombe's version of "This Is My Song" in 1967.

== Number-one singles ==
Key
*	The song did not reach number on the NME (1952–1960) or Record Retailer (1960–1969) charts which are considered by the Official Charts Company as the canonical sources.
†	The song spent a week at number one where it shared the top spot with another song.

No.	Artist (Note: The names, singles, dates and duration of the number-ones are from Disc.)	Single	Reached number one	Weeks at number one
1958
1	Elvis Presley	"Jailhouse Rock"	8 February 1958	1 † (Note: Elvis Presley's "Jailhouse Rock" and Michael Holliday's "The Story of My Life" were classified jointly as number one on 8 February 1958. The following week "The Story of My Life" claimed the number-one spot outright.)
2	Michael Holliday	"The Story of My Life"	8 February 1958	3 †
3	Perry Como	"Magic Moments"	1 March 1958	8
4	Marvin Rainwater	"Whole Lotta Woman"	26 April 1958	3
5	Connie Francis	"Who's Sorry Now"	17 May 1958	6
6	The Everly Brothers	"All I Have to Do Is Dream"	28 June 1958	8
7	The Kalin Twins	"When"	23 August 1958	5
8	Connie Francis	"Stupid Cupid" / "Carolina Moon"	27 September 1958	5
9	The Everly Brothers	"Bird Dog" *	1 November 1958	2
10	Lord Rockingham's XI	"Hoots Mon"	15 November 1958	8
1959
11	Conway Twitty	"It's Only Make Believe"	10 January 1959	3
12	Elvis Presley	"I Got Stung" / "One Night"	31 January 1959	3
13	Shirley Bassey	"As I Love You"	21 February 1959	3
14	The Platters	"Smoke Gets in Your Eyes"	14 March 1959	3
15	Russ Conway	"Side Saddle"	4 April 1959	3
16	Buddy Holly	"It Doesn't Matter Any More"	25 April 1959	4
17	Elvis Presley	"A Fool Such As I" / "I Need Your Love Tonight"	23 May 1959	4
18	Russ Conway	"Roulette"	20 June 1959	1
19	Bobby Darin	"Dream Lover"	27 June 1959	5 (Note: Due to a newspaper strike, Disc was not published from 27 June to 8 August 1959; however, the chart details were released retrospectively.)
20	Cliff Richard	"Living Doll"	1 August 1959	5
21	Craig Douglas	"Only Sixteen"	5 September 1959	5
22	Jerry Keller	"Here Comes Summer"	10 October 1959	2
23	Cliff Richard	"Travellin' Light"	24 October 1959	6
24	Emile Ford and The Checkmates	"What Do You Want to Make Those Eyes at Me For?"	5 December 1959	2
25	Adam Faith	"What Do You Want?"	19 December 1959	2
1960
re	Emile Ford and The Checkmates	"What Do You Want to Make Those Eyes at Me For?"	2 January 1960	4
26	Michael Holliday	"Starry Eyed"	30 January 1960	1
27	Anthony Newley	"Why"	6 February 1960	5
28	Adam Faith	"Poor Me"	12 March 1960	1
29	Johnny Preston	"Running Bear"	19 March 1960	2
30	Lonnie Donegan	"My Old Man's a Dustman"	2 April 1960	3
31	Elvis Presley	"Stuck on You" *	23 April 1960	1
32	Anthony Newley	"Do You Mind?"	30 April 1960	1
33	The Everly Brothers	"Cathy's Clown"	7 May 1960	7
34	Connie Francis	"Mama" / "Robot Man" *	25 June 1960	2
35	Jimmy Jones	"Good Timin'"	9 July 1960	2
36	Cliff Richard	"Please Don't Tease"	23 July 1960	4
37	The Shadows	"Apache"	20 August 1960	6
38	Ricky Valance	"Tell Laura I Love Her"	1 October 1960	3
39	Roy Orbison	"Only the Lonely (Know How I Feel)"	22 October 1960	2
40	Elvis Presley	"It's Now or Never"	5 November 1960	7
41	Cliff Richard	"I Love You"	24 December 1960	3
1961
42	Johnny Tillotson	"Poetry in Motion"	14 January 1961	1
43	Elvis Presley	"Are You Lonesome Tonight?"	21 January 1961	5
44	Petula Clark	"Sailor"	25 February 1961	2
45	The Everly Brothers	"Walk Right Back"	11 March 1961	2
46	Elvis Presley	"Wooden Heart"	25 March 1961	3
47	The Allisons	"Are You Sure?" *	15 April 1961	2
re	Elvis Presley	"Wooden Heart"	29 April 1961	1
48	The Marcels	"Blue Moon"	6 May 1961	3
49	Elvis Presley	"Surrender"	27 May 1961	3
50	Del Shannon	"Runaway"	17 June 1961	4
51	Cliff Richard	"A Girl Like You" *	15 July 1961	1
52	The Everly Brothers	"Temptation"	22 July 1961	1
53	Eden Kane	"Well I Ask You"	29 July 1961	1
54	Helen Shapiro	"You Don't Know"	5 August 1961	2
55	John Leyton	"Johnny Remember Me"	19 August 1961	7
56	The Highwaymen	"Michael (Row the Boat)"	7 October 1961	2
57	Helen Shapiro	"Walkin' Back to Happiness"	21 October 1961	3
58	Elvis Presley	"His Latest Flame"	11 November 1961	4
59	Frankie Vaughan	"Tower of Strength"	9 December 1961	5
1962
60	Acker Bilk	"Stranger on the Shore" *	6 January 1962	1
61	Cliff Richard	"The Young Ones"	13 January 1962	5
62	Elvis Presley	"Rock-A-Hula Baby" / "Can't Help Falling in Love"	17 February 1962	3
63	Kenny Ball	"March of the Siamese Children" *	10 March 1962	2
64	The Shadows	"Wonderful Land"	24 March 1962	7
65	B. Bumble and the Stingers	"Nut Rocker"	12 May 1962	1
66	Elvis Presley	"Good Luck Charm"	19 May 1962	7
67	Joe Brown	"A Picture of You" *	7 July 1962	1
68	Ray Charles	"I Can't Stop Loving You"	14 July 1962	1
69	Frank Ifield	"I Remember You"	21 July 1962	5
70	Pat Boone	"Speedy Gonzales" *	25 August 1962	2
71	Elvis Presley	"She's Not You"	8 September 1962	4
72	The Tornados	"Telstar"	6 October 1962	5
73	Frank Ifield	"Lovesick Blues"	10 November 1962	5
74	Elvis Presley	"Return to Sender"	15 December 1962	2
75	Cliff Richard	"The Next Time" / "Bachelor Boy"	29 December 1962	5
1963
76	Jet Harris and Tony Meehan	"Diamonds"	2 February 1963	2
77	Frank Ifield	"The Wayward Wind"	16 February 1963	1
78	The Beatles	"Please Please Me" *	23 February 1963	2
79	Cliff Richard	"Summer Holiday"	9 March 1963	3
80	The Shadows	"Foot Tapper"	30 March 1963	1
81	Gerry & The Pacemakers	"How Do You Do It?"	6 April 1963	4
82	The Beatles	"From Me to You"	4 May 1963	5
83	Billy J. Kramer & The Dakotas	"Do You Want to Know a Secret" *	8 June 1963	1
84	Gerry & The Pacemakers	"I Like It"	15 June 1963	5
85	Frank Ifield	"I'm Confessin'"	20 July 1963	2
86	The Searchers	"Sweets for My Sweet"	3 August 1963	3
87	Billy J. Kramer & The Dakotas	"Bad to Me"	24 August 1963	2
88	The Beatles	"She Loves You"	7 September 1963	4
89	Brian Poole and The Tremeloes	"Do You Love Me"	5 October 1963	3
90	Gerry & The Pacemakers	"You'll Never Walk Alone"	26 October 1963	5
re	The Beatles	"She Loves You"	30 November 1963	1
91	The Beatles	"I Want to Hold Your Hand"	7 December 1963	5
1964
92	The Dave Clark Five	"Glad All Over"	11 January 1964	2
93	The Swinging Blue Jeans	"Hippy Hippy Shake" *	25 January 1964	1
94	The Searchers	"Needles and Pins"	1 February 1964	3
95	Cilla Black	"Anyone Who Had a Heart"	22 February 1964	3
96	The Dave Clark Five	"Bits and Pieces" *	14 March 1964	1
97	Billy J. Kramer & The Dakotas	"Little Children"	21 March 1964	1
98	The Beatles	"Can't Buy Me Love"	28 March 1964	3
99	Peter & Gordon	"A World Without Love"	18 April 1964	2
100	The Searchers	"Don't Throw Your Love Away"	2 May 1964	2
101	The Four Pennies	"Juliet"	16 May 1964	2
102	Cilla Black	"You're My World (Il Mio Mondo)"	30 May 1964	3
103	Roy Orbison	"It's Over"	20 June 1964	2
104	The Animals	"The House of the Rising Sun"	4 July 1964	2
105	The Beatles	"A Hard Day's Night"	18 July 1964	4
106	Manfred Mann	"Do Wah Diddy Diddy"	15 August 1964	2
107	The Honeycombs	"Have I the Right?"	29 August 1964	3
108	Herman's Hermits	"I'm Into Something Good"	19 September 1964	3
109	Roy Orbison	"Oh, Pretty Woman"	10 October 1964	3
110	Sandie Shaw	"(There's) Always Something There to Remind Me"	31 October 1964	2
111	The Supremes	"Baby Love"	14 November 1964	2
112	The Rolling Stones	"Little Red Rooster"	28 November 1964	1
113	The Beatles	"I Feel Fine"	5 December 1964	6
1965
114	Georgie Fame	"Yeh Yeh"	16 January 1965	1
115	The Moody Blues	"Go Now"	23 January 1965	2
116	The Righteous Brothers	"You've Lost That Lovin' Feelin'"	6 February 1965	1
117	The Kinks	"Tired of Waiting for You"	13 February 1965	1
118	The Seekers	"I'll Never Find Another You"	20 February 1965	2
119	Tom Jones	"It's Not Unusual"	6 March 1965	1
120	The Rolling Stones	"The Last Time"	13 March 1965	4
121	Unit 4 + 2	"Concrete and Clay"	10 April 1965	1
122	The Beatles	"Ticket to Ride"	17 April 1965	4
123	The Seekers	"A World of Our Own" *	15 May 1965	1
124	Jackie Trent	"Where Are You Now (My Love)"	22 May 1965	1
125	Sandie Shaw	"Long Live Love"	29 May 1965	3
126	Elvis Presley	"Crying in the Chapel"	19 June 1965	2
127	The Hollies	"I'm Alive"	3 July 1965	2
128	The Byrds	"Mr. Tambourine Man"	17 July 1965	2
129	The Beatles	"Help!"	31 July 1965	4
130	Sonny & Cher	"I Got You Babe"	28 August 1965	2
131	The Rolling Stones	"(I Can't Get No) Satisfaction"	11 September 1965	2
132	The Walker Brothers	"Make It Easy on Yourself"	25 September 1965	1
133	Ken Dodd	"Tears"	2 October 1965	5
134	The Rolling Stones	"Get Off of My Cloud"	6 November 1965	3
135	The Seekers	"The Carnival Is Over"	27 November 1965	2
136	The Beatles	"Day Tripper" / "We Can Work It Out"	11 December 1965	5
1966
137	The Spencer Davis Group	"Keep On Running"	15 January 1966	2
138	The Overlanders	"Michelle"	29 January 1966	2
139	Nancy Sinatra	"These Boots Are Made for Walkin'"	12 February 1966	1
140	The Rolling Stones	"19th Nervous Breakdown" *	19 February 1966	3
141	Small Faces	"Sha-La-La-La-Lee" *	12 March 1966	1
142	The Walker Brothers	"The Sun Ain't Gonna Shine Anymore"	19 March 1966	4
143	The Spencer Davis Group	"Somebody Help Me"	16 April 1966	1
144	Dusty Springfield	"You Don't Have to Say You Love Me"	23 April 1966	2
145	Manfred Mann	"Pretty Flamingo"	7 May 1966	3
146	The Troggs	"Wild Thing" *	28 May 1966	1
147	Frank Sinatra	"Strangers in the Night"	4 June 1966	3
148	The Beatles	"Paperback Writer"	25 June 1966	2
149	The Kinks	"Sunny Afternoon"	9 July 1966	2
150	Chris Farlowe	"Out of Time"	23 July 1966	2
151	The Troggs	"With a Girl Like You"	6 August 1966	2
152	The Beatles	"Yellow Submarine" / "Eleanor Rigby"	20 August 1966	3
153	Small Faces	"All or Nothing"	10 September 1966	2
154	Jim Reeves	"Distant Drums"	24 September 1966	4
155	Four Tops	"Reach Out I'll Be There"	22 October 1966	4
156	The Beach Boys	"Good Vibrations"	19 November 1966	2
157	Tom Jones	"Green, Green Grass of Home"	3 December 1966	4
158	The Seekers	"Morningtown Ride" *	31 December 1966	1
1967
re	Tom Jones	"Green, Green Grass of Home"	7 January 1967	2
159	The Monkees	"I'm a Believer"	21 January 1967	4
160	Petula Clark	"This Is My Song"	18 February 1967	2
161	Engelbert Humperdinck	"Release Me"	4 March 1967	5
162	Harry Secombe	"This Is My Song" *	8 April 1967	1
163	Nancy Sinatra and Frank Sinatra	"Somethin' Stupid"	15 April 1967	2
164	Sandie Shaw	"Puppet on a String"	29 April 1967	3
165	The Tremeloes	"Silence Is Golden"	20 May 1967	3
166	Procol Harum	"A Whiter Shade of Pale"	10 June 1967	6
167	The Beatles	"All You Need Is Love"	22 July 1967	2
168	Scott McKenzie	"San Francisco (Be Sure to Wear Flowers in Your Hair)"	5 August 1967	3
