= List of NME number-one singles =

Lists of NME number-one singles, from the British New Musical Express publication, are grouped as follows:

- List of UK Singles Chart number ones of the 1950s – before 10 March 1960, NME is regarded by the Official Charts Company as canonical source for number-one singles.
- List of NME number-one singles of the 1960s
- List of NME number-one singles of the 1970s
- List of NME number-one singles of the 1980s
