= List of NME number-one singles of the 1970s =

NME (or New Musical Express) was a British weekly pop music newspaper. Record charts in the United Kingdom began life on 14 November 1952 when NME began compiling the first UK-wide sales-based hit parade. Prior to 15 February 1969, when the British Market Research Bureau chart was established, there was no one universally accepted source and many periodicals compiled their own chart. During this time the BBC used aggregated results of charts from the NME and other sources to compile the Pick of the Pops chart. In 1969, Record Retailer and the BBC commissioned the British Market Research Bureau (BMRB) to compile the singles chart.

Prior to this, The Official Charts Company and Guinness' British Hit Singles & Albums, consider Record Retailer the canonical source for the British singles chart in the 1960s; Nevertheless, in the 1960s, NME had the biggest circulation of charts in the decade and was more widely followed. After 1969, the joint venture between Record Retailer and the BBC is widely considered as the beginning of the official UK Singles Chart. NME continued compiling its own chart until 14 May 1988.

Significantly, NME had the Sex Pistols' anti-monarchy single "God Save the Queen" at number-one during the Silver Jubilee of Elizabeth II. The single, released by Virgin Records, was the highest-selling single of the week but had been banned by the BBC and some major retailers. To prevent it from reaching the top of the BMRB chart, for one week compilers "decreed that shops which sold their own records could not have those records represented in the chart", thus sales from Virgin Megastores were not counted. Despite reaching number-two on the official chart, it is sometimes referred to as reaching number one.

== Number-one singles ==
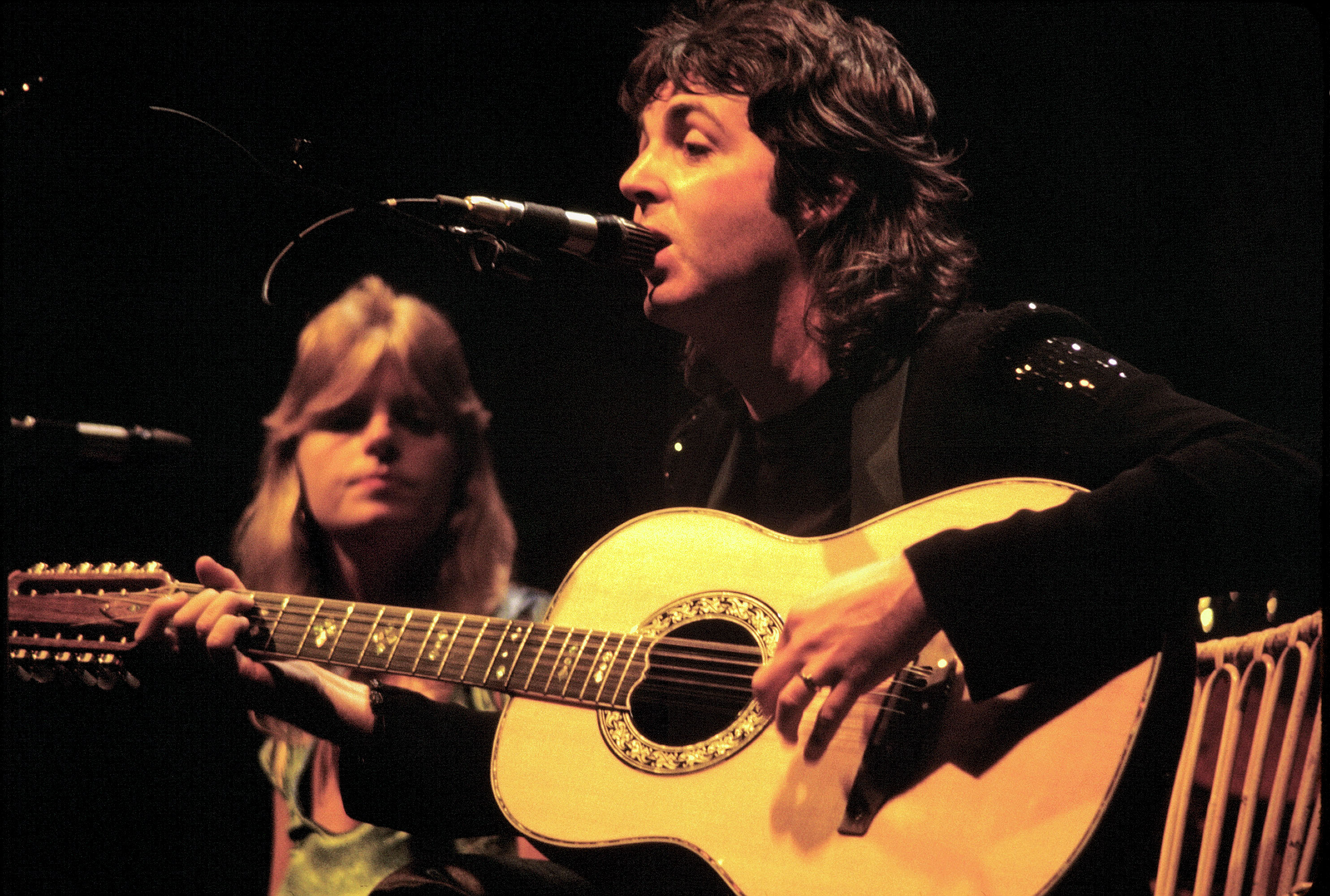
Paul McCartney (performing with wife Linda in 1976) had two NME number ones in the 1970s – one solo, one with his band Wings – that did not make the top of the Official Charts.

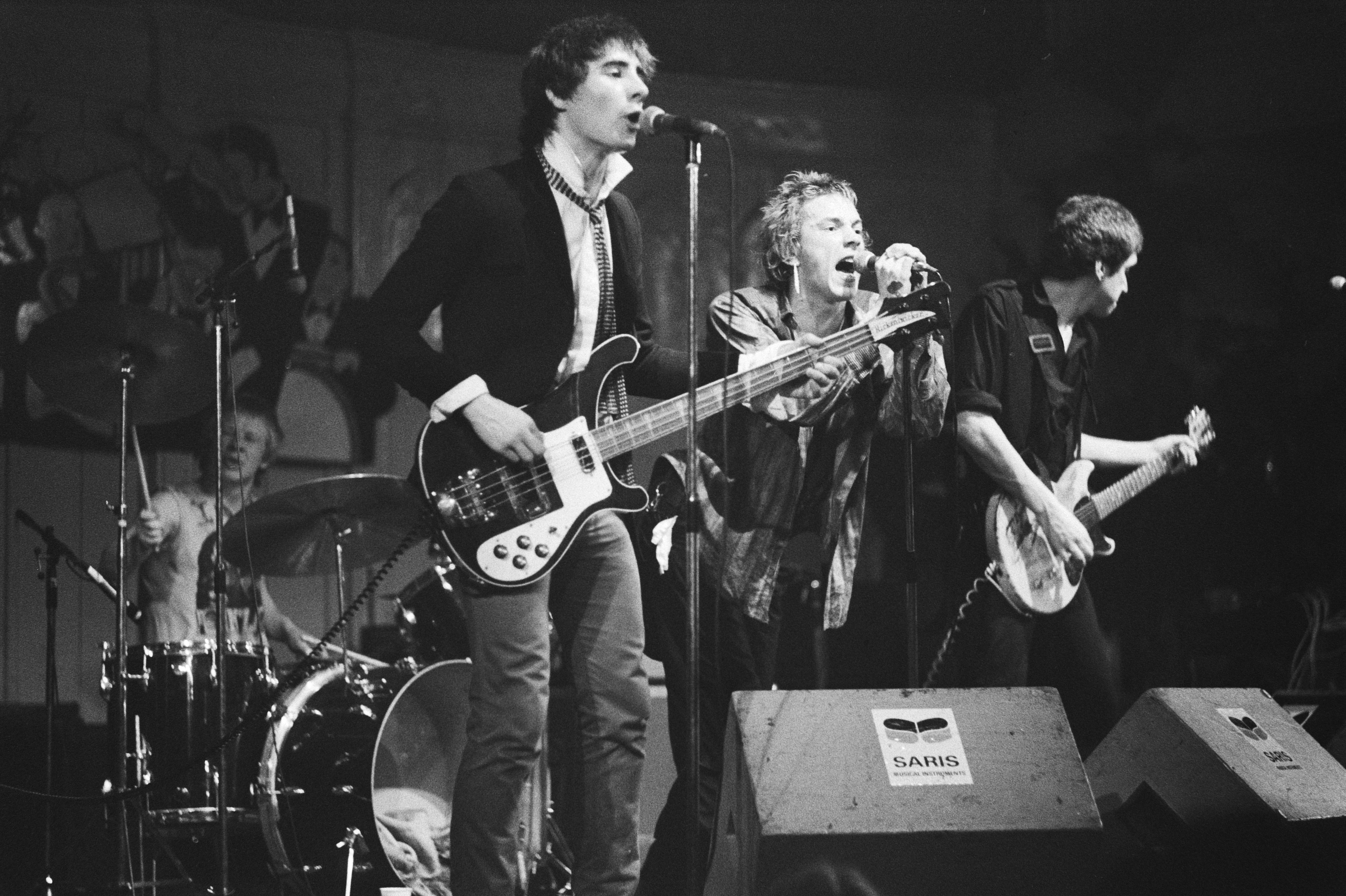
The only chart on which the Sex Pistols' infamous "God Save the Queen" made number one was NME.

Key
‡	The song did not reach number one on the BMRB chart which is considered as the official chart after 12 February 1969.
[nb #]	The song spent a week at number one where it shared the top spot with another song.

No.	Artist (Note: The names, singles, dates and duration of the number-ones are from the NME.)	Single	Reached number one	Weeks at number one
1970
280	Rolf Harris	"Two Little Boys"	20 December 1969	6
281	Marmalade	"Reflections of My Life" ‡	28 January 1970	1
282	Edison Lighthouse	"Love Grows (Where My Rosemary Goes)"	4 February 1970	3
283	The Jackson 5	"I Want You Back" ‡	25 February 1970	1
284	Lee Marvin	"Wand'rin' Star"	4 March 1970	3
285	Simon & Garfunkel	"Bridge over Troubled Water"	25 March 1970	4
286	Norman Greenbaum	"Spirit in the Sky"	22 April 1970	2
287	England World Cup Squad "70"	"Back Home"	6 May 1970	3
288	The Moody Blues	"Question" ‡	27 May 1970	1
289	Christie	"Yellow River"	3 June 1970	1
290	Mungo Jerry	"In the Summertime"	10 June 1970	4
291	Free	"All Right Now" ‡	8 July 1970	3
292	The Kinks	"Lola" ‡	29 July 1970	1
293	Elvis Presley	"The Wonder of You"	5 August 1970	3
294	Smokey Robinson and The Miracles	"The Tears of a Clown"	26 August 1970	4
295	Freda Payne	"Band of Gold"	23 September 1970	5
296	Deep Purple	"Black Night" ‡	28 October 1970	1
297	Matthews' Southern Comfort	"Woodstock"	4 November 1970	3
298	Jimi Hendrix Experience	"Voodoo Chile"	25 November 1970	1
299	Dave Edmunds's Rockpile	"I Hear You Knocking"	2 December 1970	3
300	McGuinness Flint	"When I'm Dead and Gone" ‡	23 December 1970	1
301	Clive Dunn	"Grandad"	30 December 1970	4
1971
302	George Harrison	"My Sweet Lord"	27 January 1971	6
303	Mungo Jerry	"Baby Jump"	10 March 1971	1
304	Paul McCartney	"Another Day" ‡	17 March 1971	1
305	T. Rex	"Hot Love"	24 March 1971	5
306	Dave and Ansel Collins	"Double Barrel"	28 April 1971	2
307	The Rolling Stones	"Brown Sugar" ‡	12 May 1971	1
308	Dawn	"Knock Three Times"	19 May 1971	3
309	Free	"My Brother Jake" ‡	9 June 1971	1
310	Tony Christie	"I Did What I Did for Maria" ‡	16 June 1971	1
311	Middle of the Road	"Chirpy Chirpy Cheep Cheep"	23 June 1971	5
312	T. Rex	"Get It On"	28 July 1971	3
313	The New Seekers	"Never Ending Song of Love" ‡	18 August 1971	1
314	Diana Ross	"I'm Still Waiting"	25 August 1971	3
315	The Tams	"Hey Girl Don't Bother Me"	15 September 1971	2
316	Rod Stewart	"Maggie May"	29 September 1971	6
317	Slade	"Coz I Luv You"	10 November 1971	3
318	Benny Hill	"Ernie (The Fastest Milkman in the West)"	1 December 1971	5
1972
319	The New Seekers	"I'd Like to Teach the World to Sing (In Perfect Harmony)"	5 January 1972	4
320	America	"A Horse with No Name" ‡	2 February 1972	1
321	T. Rex	"Telegram Sam"	9 February 1972	1
322	Chicory Tip	"Son of My Father"	16 February 1972	2
323	Don McLean	"American Pie" ‡	1 March 1972	1
324	Nilsson	"Without You"	8 March 1972	6
325	Royal Scots Dragoon Guards	"Amazing Grace"	19 April 1972	4
326	T.Rex	"Metal Guru"	17 May 1972	4
327	Don McLean	"Vincent"	14 June 1972	3
328	Slade	"Take Me Bak 'Ome"	5 July 1972	1
329	Donny Osmond	"Puppy Love"	12 July 1972	4
330	Alice Cooper	"School's Out"	9 August 1972	3
331	Rod Stewart	"You Wear It Well"	30 August 1972	2
332	Slade	"Mama Weer All Crazee Now"	13 September 1972	2
333	T. Rex	"Children of the Revolution" ‡	27 September 1972	1
334	David Cassidy	"How Can I Be Sure"	4 October 1972	1
335	Lieutenant Pigeon	"Mouldy Old Dough"	11 October 1972	4
336	Gilbert O'Sullivan	"Clair"	8 November 1972	2
337	Chuck Berry	"My Ding-a-Ling"	22 November 1972	3
338	Slade	"Gudbuy T'Jane" ‡	13 December 1972	1
339	Little Jimmy Osmond	"Long Haired Lover from Liverpool"	20 December 1972	4
1973
340	David Bowie	"The Jean Genie" ‡	17 January 1973	1
341	Sweet	"Blockbuster"	24 January 1973	4
342	Strawbs	"Part of the Union" ‡	21 February 1973	2
343	Slade	"Cum On Feel the Noize"	7 March 1973	3
344	Donny Osmond	"The Twelfth of Never"	28 March 1973	2
345	Gilbert O'Sullivan	"Get Down"	11 April 1973	1
346	Dawn featuring Tony Orlando	"Tie a Yellow Ribbon Round the Ole Oak Tree"	18 April 1973	5
347	Wizzard	"See My Baby Jive"	23 May 1973	2
348	Suzi Quatro	"Can the Can"	6 June 1973	3
349	10cc	"Rubber Bullets"	27 June 1973	1
350	Slade	"Skweeze Me, Pleeze Me"	4 July 1973	2
351	Peters and Lee	"Welcome Home"	18 July 1973	2
352	Gary Glitter	"I'm the Leader of the Gang (I Am!)"	1 August 1973	4
353	Donny Osmond	"Young Love"	29 August 1973	2
354	Wizzard	"Angel Fingers (A Teen Ballad)"	12 September 1973	1
355	David Essex	"Rock On" ‡	19 September 1973	1
356	Sweet	"The Ballroom Blitz" ‡	26 September 1973	1
357	Simon Park Orchestra	"Eye Level (Theme From The Thames TV Series "Van Der Valk")"	3 October 1973	4
358	David Cassidy	"The Puppy Song" / "Daydreamer"	31 October 1973	2
359	The Osmonds	"Let Me In" ‡	14 November 1973	1
360	Gary Glitter	"I Love You Love Me Love"	21 November 1973	4
361	Slade	"Merry Christmas Everybody"	19 December 1973	2 (Note: There was no chart published for the week ending 26 December 1973. In the preceding week, "Merry Xmas Everybody" was the number-one single. In the next published chart, "You Won't Find Another Fool Like Me" claimed the top spot.)
1974
362	New Seekers feat. Lyn Paul	"You Won't Find Another Fool Like Me"	2 January 1974	2
363	Leo Sayer	"The Show Must Go On" ‡	16 January 1974	1
364	Sweet	"Teenage Rampage" ‡	23 January 1974	1
365	Mud	"Tiger Feet"	30 January 1974	3
366	Suzi Quatro	"Devil Gate Drive"	20 February 1974	2
367	Alvin Stardust	"Jealous Mind"	6 March 1974	2
368	Paper Lace	"Billy Don't Be a Hero"	20 March 1974	3
369	Terry Jacks	"Seasons in the Sun"	10 April 1974	2
370	Mud	"The Cat Crept In" ‡	24 April 1974	1
371	ABBA	"Waterloo"	1 May 1974	2
372	The Rubettes	"Sugar Baby Love"	15 May 1974	4
373	Ray Stevens	"The Streak"	12 June 1974	2
374	Gary Glitter	"Always Yours"	26 June 1974	1
375	Charles Aznavour	"She"	3 July 1974	3
376	George McCrae	"Rock Your Baby"	24 July 1974	3
377	The Three Degrees	"When Will I See You Again"	14 August 1974	3
378	The Osmonds	"Love Me for a Reason"	4 September 1974	2
379	Carl Douglas	"Kung Fu Fighting"	18 September 1974	4
380	Peter Shelley	"Gee Baby" ‡	16 October 1974	1
381	Ken Boothe	"Everything I Own"	23 October 1974	2
382	David Essex	"Gonna Make You a Star"	6 November 1974	5
383	Barry White	"You're the First, the Last, My Everything"	11 December 1974	1
384	Mud	"Lonely This Christmas"	18 December 1974	3
1975
385	Ralph McTell	"Streets of London" ‡	8 January 1975	2
386	Status Quo	"Down Down"	22 January 1975	1
387	The Tymes	"Ms Grace"	29 January 1975	1
388	Pilot	"January"	5 February 1975	2
389	The Carpenters	"Please Mr. Postman" ‡	19 February 1975	1
390	Steve Harley & Cockney Rebel	"Make Me Smile (Come Up and See Me)"	26 February 1975	1
391	Telly Savalas	"If"	5 March 1975	2
392	Bay City Rollers	"Bye Bye Baby (Baby Goodbye)"	19 March 1975	6
393	Bobby Goldsboro	"Honey" ‡	30 April 1975	1
394	Minnie Riperton	"Lovin' You" ‡	7 May 1975	1
395	Tammy Wynette	"Stand by Your Man"	14 May 1975	3
396	Windsor Davies and Don Estelle	"Whispering Grass"	4 June 1975	1
397	Showaddywaddy	"Three Steps to Heaven" ‡	11 June 1975	1
re	Windsor Davies and Don Estelle	"Whispering Grass"	18 June 1975	1
398	10cc	"I'm Not in Love"	25 June 1975	2
399	Johnny Nash	"Tears on My Pillow"	9 July 1975	2
400	Bay City Rollers	"Give a Little Love"	23 July 1975	1
401	Typically Tropical	"Barbados"	30 July 1975	2
402	The Stylistics	"Can't Give You Anything (But My Love)"	13 August 1975	2
403	Rod Stewart	"Sailing"	27 August 1975	4
404	Leo Sayer	"Moonlighting" ‡	24 September 1975	1
405	David Essex	"Hold Me Close"	1 October 1975	3
406	Art Garfunkel	"I Only Have Eyes for You"	22 October 1975	2
407	David Bowie	"Space Oddity"	5 November 1975	2
408	Billy Connolly	"D.I.V.O.R.C.E."	19 November 1975	1
409	Hot Chocolate	"You Sexy Thing" ‡	26 November 1975	1
410	Queen	"Bohemian Rhapsody"	3 December 1975	7
1976
411	Sailor	"A Glass of Champagne" ‡	21 January 1976	1
412	ABBA	"Mamma Mia"	28 January 1976	2
413	Slik	"Forever and Ever"	11 February 1976	1
414	The Four Seasons	"December, 1963 (Oh, What a Night)"	18 February 1976	2
415	Tina Charles	"I Love to Love (But My Baby Loves to Dance)"	3 March 1976	3
416	Brotherhood of Man	"Save Your Kisses for Me"	24 March 1976	5
417	ABBA	"Fernando"	28 April 1976	6
418	J. J. Barrie	"No Charge"	9 June 1976	1
419	Wings	"Silly Love Songs" ‡	16 June 1976	1
420	The Real Thing	"You to Me Are Everything"	23 June 1976	2
421	Candi Staton	"Young Hearts Run Free" ‡	7 July 1976	1
422	Demis Roussos	"The Roussos Phenomenon"	14 July 1976	1
423	Elton John & Kiki Dee	"Don't Go Breaking My Heart"	21 July 1976	7
424	ABBA	"Dancing Queen"	8 September 1976	5
425	Pussycat	"Mississippi"	13 October 1976	3
426	Chicago	"If You Leave Me Now"	3 November 1976	4
427	Showaddywaddy	"Under the Moon of Love"	1 December 1976	3
428	Johnny Mathis	"When a Child Is Born"	22 December 1976	3 (Note: There was no chart published for the week ending 5 January 1977. For the week either side of this "When a Child Is Born" was the number-one single.)
1977
429	David Soul	"Don't Give Up on Us"	12 January 1977	2
430	Julie Covington	"Don't Cry for Me Argentina"	26 January 1977	1
re	David Soul	"Don't Give Up on Us"	2 February 1977	1
re	Julie Covington	"Don't Cry for Me Argentina"	9 February 1977	2
431	Leo Sayer	"When I Need You"	23 February 1977	2
432	The Manhattan Transfer	"Chanson D'Amour"	9 March 1977	2
433	ABBA	"Knowing Me, Knowing You"	23 March 1977	6
434	Deniece Williams	"Free"	4 May 1977	3
435	Rod Stewart	"I Don't Want to Talk About It" / "The First Cut Is the Deepest"	25 May 1977	3
436	Sex Pistols	"God Save the Queen" ‡	15 June 1977	1
437	The Jacksons	"Show You the Way to Go"	22 June 1977	2
438	Hot Chocolate	"So You Win Again"	6 July 1977	1
439	Boney M.	"Ma Baker" ‡	13 July 1977	1
440	Donna Summer	"I Feel Love"	20 July 1977	5
441	Brotherhood of Man	"Angelo"	24 August 1977	1
442	Elvis Presley	"Way Down"	31 August 1977	1
443	Space	"Magic Fly" ‡	7 September 1977	3
re	Elvis Presley	"Way Down"	28 September 1977	2
444	David Soul	"Silver Lady"	12 October 1977	1
445	Baccara	"Yes Sir, I Can Boogie"	19 October 1977	1
446	Rod Stewart	"You're in My Heart" ‡	26 October 1977	1
re	Baccara	"Yes Sir, I Can Boogie"	2 November 1977	1
447	ABBA	"The Name of the Game"	9 November 1977	2
448	Status Quo	"Rockin' All Over the World" ‡	23 November 1977	1
449	Wings	"Mull of Kintyre"	30 November 1977	9 (Note: There was no chart published for the week ending 28 December 1977. For the week either side of this "Mull of Kintyre" was the number-one single.)
1978
450	Althea & Donna	"Uptown Top Ranking"	1 February 1978	2
451	ABBA	"Take a Chance on Me"	15 February 1978	3
452	Kate Bush	"Wuthering Heights"	8 March 1978	3
453	Blondie	"Denis" ‡	29 March 1978	2
454	Showaddywaddy	"I Wonder Why" ‡	12 April 1978	1
455	Bee Gees	"Night Fever"	19 April 1978	4
456	Boney M.	"Rivers of Babylon"	17 May 1978	4
457	John Travolta and Olivia Newton-John	"You're the One That I Want"	14 June 1978	10
458	Commodores	"Three Times a Lady"	23 August 1978	4
459	10cc	"Dreadlock Holiday"	20 September 1978	2
460	John Travolta and Olivia Newton-John	"Summer Nights"	4 October 1978	6
461	The Boomtown Rats	"Rat Trap"	8 November 1978	3
462	Rod Stewart	"Da Ya Think I'm Sexy?"	29 November 1978	1
463	Boney M.	"Mary's Boy Child – Oh My Lord"	6 December 1978	4 (Note: There was no chart published for the week ending 27 December 1978. For the preceding week, "Mary's Boy Child - Oh My Lord" was the number-one single. In the next published chart, "Y.M.C.A." claimed the top spot.)
1979
464	Village People	"Y.M.C.A."	3 January 1979	3
465	Ian Dury	"Hit Me with Your Rhythm Stick"	24 January 1979	2
466	Blondie	"Heart of Glass"	7 February 1979	1
467	ABBA	"Chiquitita" ‡	14 February 1979	1
re	Blondie	"Heart of Glass"	21 February 1979	2
468	Bee Gees	"Tragedy"	7 March 1979	1
469	Elvis Costello	"Oliver's Army" ‡	14 March 1979	1
470	Gloria Gaynor	"I Will Survive"	21 March 1979	2
471	Village People	"In the Navy" ‡	4 April 1979	1
472	Art Garfunkel	"Bright Eyes"	11 April 1979	5
473	M	"Pop Muzik" ‡	16 May 1979	1
re	Art Garfunkel	"Bright Eyes"	23 May 1979	1
474	Blondie	"Sunday Girl"	30 May 1979	1
475	Roxy Music	"Dance Away" ‡	6 June 1979	1
476	Anita Ward	"Ring My Bell"	13 June 1979	3
477	Tubeway Army	"Are "Friends" Electric?"	4 July 1979	2
478	Janet Kay	"Silly Games" ‡	18 July 1979	1
re	Tubeway Army	"Are "Friends" Electric?"	25 July 1979	2
479	The Boomtown Rats	"I Don't Like Mondays"	8 August 1979	4
480	Cliff Richard	"We Don't Talk Anymore"	5 September 1979	3
481	Gary Numan	"Cars"	26 September 1979	2
482	The Police	"Message in a Bottle"	10 October 1979	2
483	The Buggles	"Video Killed the Radio Star"	24 October 1979	2
484	Lena Martell	"One Day at a Time"	7 November 1979	1
485	Dr. Hook	"When You're in Love with a Beautiful Woman"	14 November 1979	4
486	The Police	"Walking on the Moon"	12 December 1979	1
487	Pink Floyd	"Another Brick in the Wall (Part II)"	19 December 1979	4 (Note: There was no chart published for the week ending 26 December 1979. For the week either side of this "Another Brick in the Wall (Part II)" was the number-one single.)
