= List of Melody Maker number-one singles =

Lists of Melody Maker number-one singles, from the British publication of the same name, are grouped as follows:

- List of Melody Maker number-one singles from 1956 to 1969
- List of Melody Maker number-one singles of the 1970s
- List of Melody Maker number-one singles of the 1980s
