= Where Are You Now (Jackie Trent song) =

- Swedish picture sleeve

Single by Jackie Trent
- B-side: "On the Other Side of the Tracks"
- Released: 5 March 1965
- Recorded: December 1964
- Genre: Pop
- Length: 2:47
- Label: Pye
- Composer: Tony Hatch
- Lyricist: Jackie Trent
- Producer: Tony Hatch

Jackie Trent singles chronology
| "How Soon" (1964) | "Where Are You Now" (1965) | "Pick Up the Pieces" (1965) |

"Where Are You Now" is a 1965 song written by Tony Hatch and Jackie Trent. A ballad, it was commissioned for use in the Granada Television police drama It's Dark Outside. A recording by Trent, released in response to demand from viewers of the series, became her only top 30 hit when it reached the top of the UK singles chart for one week in May 1965. She was the first female artist in the United Kingdom to be a credited writer on her own number one single.

== Background and composition ==
A performer since childhood, Jackie Trent recorded her first singles, for Oriole Records, in 1962. A 1963 move to Pye Records united Trent with producer Tony Hatch, but her early recordings for the label were unsuccessful. In late 1964, Hatch was approached by Granada Television to compose a song to be featured in the police drama It's Dark Outside, starring William Mervyn as Chief Inspector Charles Rose. (Note: Hatch had previously written the Crossroads theme for the Associated Television soap opera.) Hatch composed the music and enlisted Trent, who had won a national poetry competition as a teenager, to contribute the lyrics. The ballad, titled "Where Are You Now", was the pair's first songwriting collaboration. Hatch felt Trent's words "expressed the thoughts of a woman looking for a man she really wants." Writer and Saint Etienne musician Bob Stanley has described the song as "an Anglo-Bacharach playlet, with Jackie playing the schoolteacher stood up in the rain, walking back to her West Hampstead bedsit."

== Release ==
Trent recorded "Where Are You Now" shortly before travelling to South Africa for a three-month tour. Speaking in 1965, the singer said she was "so used to having near-misses" that she had already started looking for a follow-up to the song after recording it. The second series of It's Dark Outside was transmitted during Trent's absence from the UK, with "Where Are You Now" used diegetically in several episodes, played incessantly by the doomed female lead Claire (played by Veronica Strong). Many viewers contacted shops and publications to inquire about the song, prompting Pye to issue Trent's recording as a single backed with a version of "On the Other Side of the Tracks", written by Cy Coleman and Carolyn Leigh for the 1962 Neil Simon musical Little Me. Trent performed the song on the 29 April 1965 edition of BBC1's Top of the Pops. For one week in May 1965, the single made number one on the Record Retailer, Disc, NME and Melody Maker charts in the UK, knocking the Beatles' "Ticket to Ride" off the top spot on the latter two charts. Trent was informed of the record making number one ahead of her performance at the London Palladium. The song reached number three in Canada.

Trent achieved two further hits on the UK singles chart, both collaborations with Hatch – "When the Summertime is Over", which charted at number 39 in July 1965, and "I'll Be There", which made number 38 in April 1969. Hatch and Trent married in 1967.

== Reception ==
Among retrospective notices, John Bush of AllMusic has described "Where Are You Now" as "nearly as beautiful a piece of AM pop as Dusty Springfield or Petula Clark ever recorded", citing "Hatch's melodramatic string production and Trent's tortured vocals." Reviewing the single for Freaky Trigger in 2005, Tom Ewing criticised Trent's "plummy, annoying, precision" as a vocalist, describing the singer as "a posher, charisma-free Cilla". Writing in 2015, Bob Stanley praised the "beautifully controlled" song and described it as "an unlikely number one... ...simmering with the same restrained sexuality as Brief Encounter".
