= The Price of Love =

1965 song by the Everly Brothers

Single by the Everly Brothers

from the album In Our Image
- B-side: "It Only Costs a Dime"
- Released: 1965
- Genre: Pop rock
- Length: 2:23
- Label: Warner Bros.
- Songwriter: Don Everly and Phil Everly

The Everly Brothers singles chronology
"That'll Be the Day" (1965)	"The Price of Love" (1965)	"I'll Never Get Over You" (1965)

Licensed audio
- "The Price of Love" (2006 remaster) on YouTube

"The Price of Love" is a song by the Everly Brothers, released in 1965. It charted at No. 2 on the UK Singles Chart and No. 3 on the Irish Singles Chart. It spent one week at No. 1 on the UK's NME chart, but in the US, the song failed to chart on the Billboard Hot 100.

Cash Box described it as "a raunchy, pulsating bluesy thumper which delineates the problems of a modern-day teenager romance."

== Chart performance ==
Chart (1965)	Peak position
Ireland (IRMA)	3
United Kingdom (Record Retailer)	2
United Kingdom (NME)	1
U.S. Billboard	104

== Bryan Ferry version ==
"The Price of Love"

Single by Bryan Ferry

from the album Let's Stick Together
- B-side: "Shame, Shame, Shame"
- Released: July 1976
- Studio: AIR (London)
- Length: 3:13
- Label: Island
- Songwriter: Don Everly and Phil Everly
- Producers: Chris Thomas; Bryan Ferry

Bryan Ferry singles chronology
"Let's Stick Together" (1976)	"The Price of Love" (1976)	"Heart on My Sleeve" (1976)

Music video
- "The Price of Love" on YouTube

Bryan Ferry included a recording of the song on his album 1976 Let's Stick Together, and as the first track on the July 1976 EP Extended Play. It reached No. 7 in the UK chart, peaked at No. 9 on the Australian Singles Chart and was the 69th biggest-selling single in Australia in 1976.

Lead guitar was performed by Chris Spedding.
