= As I Love You =

Song by Shirley Bassey with Wally Stott & His Orchestra
- B-side: "Hands Across the Sea"
- Published: 1958
- Released: July 1958
- Label: Philips
- Songwriters: Jay Livingston and Ray Evans
- Producer: Johnny Franz

"As I Love You" is a 1958 hit song by Shirley Bassey with Wally Stott & His Orchestra, written by Jay Livingston and Ray Evans for the Universal International motion picture, The Big Beat (1958).

From 20 February 1959, it was number one on the UK Singles Chart for four weeks.
