= Hit parade =

Ranked list of most popular recordings

A hit parade is a ranked list of the most popular recordings at a given point in time, usually determined either by sales or airplay. The term originated in the 1930s; Billboard magazine published its first music hit parade on January 4, 1936. It has also been used by broadcast programs which featured hit (sheet music and record) tunes such as Your Hit Parade, which aired on radio and television in the United States from 1935 through the 1950s.

== See also ==
- Record chart
