= Do You Mind (Anthony Newley song) =

1960 song

"Do You Mind" is a 1960 hit song by English singer Anthony Newley. Written by Lionel Bart, the song reached number-one in the UK Singles Chart in April 1960 and was the 100th number-one single in the chart's history.

A cover version of the song by Andy Williams reached No.70 in the Billboard Hot 100 in America.
