= Don't Throw Your Love Away =

1963 song written by Billy Jackson and Jimmy Wisner

Single by The Orlons
- A-side: "Bon-Doo-Wah"
- Released: November 1963
- Genre: R&B
- Length: 2:04
- Label: Cameo C-287
- Songwriter: Billy Jackson / Jimmy Wisner

The Orlons singles chronology
"Crossfire!" (1963)	"Bon-Doo-Wah" / "Don't Throw Your Love Away" (1963)	"Shimmy Shimmy" (1964)

"Don't Throw Your Love Away"

Single by The Searchers

from the album It's the Searchers
- B-side: "I Pretend I'm With You"
- Released: April 1964
- Recorded: 1963
- Studio: Pye Studios, London
- Genre: Merseybeat
- Length: 2:17
- Label: Pye 7N15630 (UK); Kapp 593 (USA)
- Songwriter: Billy Jackson / Jimmy Wisner
- Producer: Tony Hatch

The Searchers singles chronology
"Needles and Pins" (1964)	"Don't Throw Your Love Away" (1964)	"Someday We're Gonna Love Again" (1964)

"Don't Throw Your Love Away" is a song written by Billy Jackson and Jimmy Wisner that was originally released in 1963 by The Orlons. It was the B-side to "Bon-Doo-Wah", which peaked at No.55 in the US charts.

== Cover Versions ==
- The Searchers released it in April 1964 and went to No.1 on the UK Singles Chart and the Irish Singles Chart; No.4 in Denmark, No. 3 on Canada's CHUM Chart, No.6 on 24 July 1964 on WLS, and No.16 on 11 July 1964 on the Hot 100.
- Elvis Costello and Amsterdam recorded a version of the song for Liverpool – The Number Ones Album released in 2008.

== See also ==
- List of number-one singles of 1964 (Ireland)
- List of number-one singles from the 1960s (UK)
