= The Overlanders (band) =

British band

The Overlanders were a British music group active during the 1960s. They had a UK number-one hit single in 1966 with a cover of the Beatles song "Michelle".

== Career ==
Originally playing folk songs, the band found success hard to come by during the beat era and so converted to a more mainstream sound. In 1964, they had a regional hit in the Chicago area of the United States, and in Australia, with a cover of "Don't It Make You Feel Good", a song written and recorded by The Shadows in UK. That same year, their rendition of Chad Stuart's "Yesterday's Gone" received much airplay in the US and became a minor hit.

Although they released twelve singles on the Pye record label between 1963 and 1966, the Overlanders' only British hit was a cover version of the Beatles' "Michelle", featuring arrangements by Tony Hatch. It reached number one in the UK Singles Chart in January 1966 just a few weeks after it appeared on the Beatles' Rubber Soul album and beat off a rival recording by David and Jonathan, whose version was produced by George Martin.

A collection of complete recordings, titled Michelle: The Pye Anthology, was released on CD by Castle Records in 2001.

== Personnel ==
The original trio were:

- Paul Arnold – lead guitar, vocals (born Paul Arnold Friswell, 18 August 1942, Bretford, Rugby, Warwickshire)
- Laurie Mason – piano, percussion, vocals (born 11 November 1939, Middlesbrough, North Yorkshire, died 15 December 1993, Florida).
- Peter Bartholomew – guitar, vocals (born 20 May 1941, Andover, Hampshire)
- David Walsh – drums (born 10 August 1947, Birmingham, Warwickshire)
- Terry Widlake - Bass and vocals, born Birmingham 1940
- Rick Wild - Guitar, Keyboard, Vocals, born Huddersfield 1947

Walsh and Widlake joined in November 1965. Just before leaving for playing a months gig in the Storyville club Frankfurt throughout December 1965 they recorded Michelle in Pye studios, London produced by Tony Hatch. They arrived back in the UK January 1st 1966 as Michelle was released.

When Arnold left in late 1966 to pursue a solo career, he was replaced by Ian Griffiths. Widlake left in 1968. Walsh left January 1st 1967 and joined Birmingham band Second City Sound.
