= List of UK top-ten singles in 1953 =

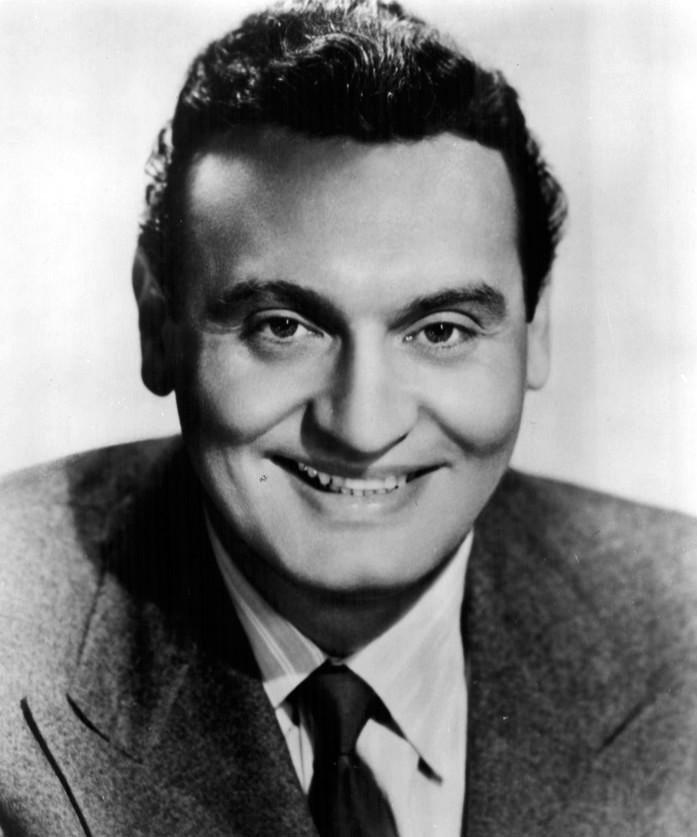
Frankie Laine's "I Believe" not only became the biggest-selling single of 1953, but also topped the chart for 18 non-consecutive weeks, a record which stood until 2026 when "Rein Me In" by Sam Fender and Olivia Dean overtook it with 23 weeks in total. Laine had five other top 10 hits this year, two of which also reached number-one: "Hey Joe!" and "Answer Me".

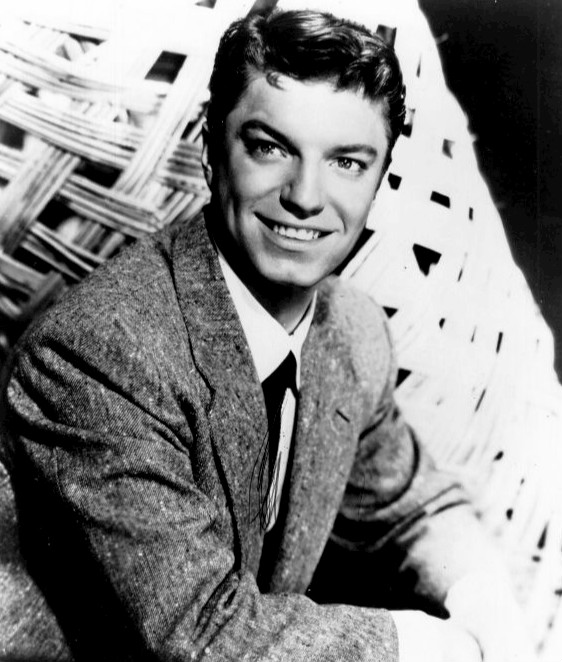
Guy Mitchell was another artist who dominated the UK charts this year, securing six top 10 singles, including the number-one hits "She Wears Red Feathers" and "Look at That Girl".

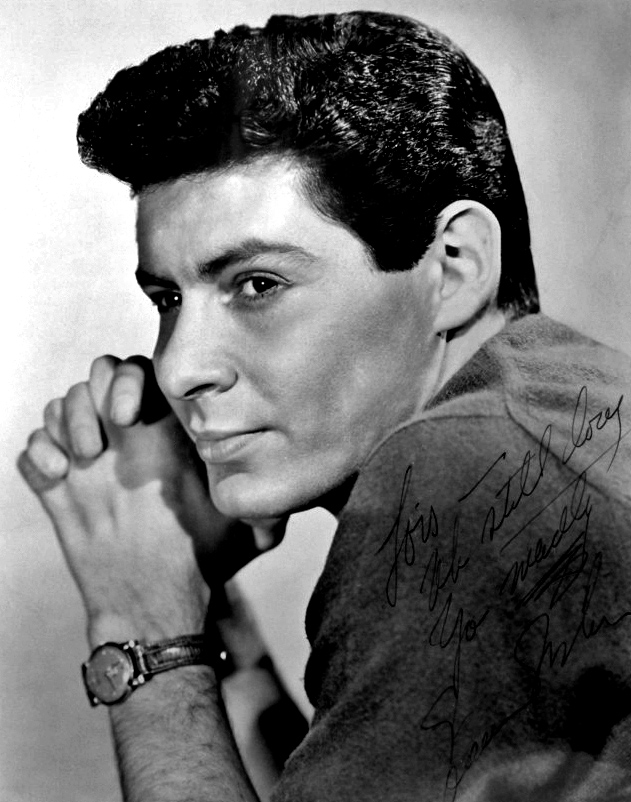
Eddie Fisher achieved five UK top 10 entries in 1953, including the number-one hits "Outside of Heaven" and "I'm Walking Behind You".

The UK Singles Chart is one of many music charts compiled by the Official Charts Company that calculates the best-selling singles of the week in the United Kingdom. Before 2004, the chart was only based on the sales of physical singles. New Musical Express (NME) magazine had published the United Kingdom record charts for the first time in 1952. NME originally published only a top 12 (although the first chart had a couple of singles that were tied so a top 15 was announced) but this was gradually extended to encompass a top 20 by October 1954. This list shows singles that peaked in the top 10 of the UK Singles Chart during 1953, as well as singles which peaked in 1952 and 1954 but were in the top 10 in 1953. The entry date is when the single appeared in the top 10 for the first time (week ending, as published by the Official Charts Company, which is six days after the chart is announced).

Seventy-nine singles were in the top 10 in 1953. Sixteen singles from 1952 remained in the top 10 for several weeks at the beginning of the year, while "Oh Mein Papa" by Eddie Calvert, "Chicka Boom" by Guy Mitchell and "Let's Have a Party" by Winifred Atwell were all released in 1953 but did not reach their peak until 1954. "You Belong to Me" by Jo Stafford, "Comes A-Long A-Love" by Kay Starr, "Takes Two to Tango" by Louis Armstrong, "Cowpuncher's Cantata" by Max Bygraves, "Walkin' to Missouri" by Tony Brent and "Britannia Rag" by Winifred Atwell were the singles from 1952 to reach their peak in 1953. Seventeen artists scored multiple entries in the top 10 in 1953. David Whitfield, Dean Martin, Eddie Fisher and Perry Como were among the many artists who achieved their first UK charting top 10 single in 1953.

The 1952 Christmas number-one, "Here in My Heart" by Al Martino, remained at number-one for the first three weeks of 1953. The first new number-one single of the year was "You Belong to Me" by Jo Stafford. Overall, thirteen different singles peaked at number-one in 1953, with Frankie Laine (3) having the most singles hit that position.

== Background ==
=== Multiple entries ===
Eighty singles charted in the top 10 in 1953, with sixty-three singles reaching their peak this year. Eleven songs were recorded by several artists with each version reaching the top 10:

- "(How Much Is) That Doggie in the Window" – Lita Roza, Patti Page
- "Answer Me" – David Whitfield, Frankie Laine
- "Because You're Mine" – Nat King Cole, Mario Lanza (both peaked 1952)
- "Broken Wings" – Art and Dotty Todd, The Stargazers
- "Dragnet" – Ray Anthony and His Orchestra, Ted Heath & His Music
- "Faith Can Move Mountains" – Johnnie Ray & The Four Lads (peaked 1952), Nat King Cole
- "I Saw Mommy Kissing Santa Claus" – The Beverley Sisters, Jimmy Boyd
- "In a Golden Coach (There's a Heart of Gold)" – Billy Cotton & His Band, Dickie Valentine
- "Swedish Rhapsody" – Mantovani, Ray Martin
- "Terry's Theme from Limelight" – Frank Chacksfield, Ron Goodwin, Jimmy Young (version known as "Eternally")

Seventeen artists scored multiple entries in the top 10 in 1953. American Frankie Laine secured the record for most top 10 hits in 1953 with eight hit singles.

David Whitfield was one of a number of artists with two top 10 entries, including the number-one single "Answer Me". Al Martino, Dickie Valentine, Mantovani, Ted Heath & His Music and Tony Brent were among the other artists who had multiple top 10 entries in 1953.

=== Chart debuts ===
Thirty-eight artists achieved their first top 10 single in 1953, either as a lead or featured artist. Of these, three went on to record another hit single that year: Billy Cotton and His Band, Frank Chacksfield and Jimmy Boyd. David Whitfield, Dickie Valentine and Ted Heath & His Music all peaked in the top ten with two more songs. Eddie Fisher had four other entries in his breakthrough year.

The following table (collapsed on desktop site) does not include acts who had previously charted as part of a group and secured their first top 10 solo single.

Artist	Number of top 10s	First entry	Chart position	Other entries
Max Bygraves	1	"Cowpuncher's Cantata" ^{[B]}	6	—
Eddie Fisher	5	"Outside of Heaven"	1	"Everything I Have Is Yours" (8), "Downhearted" (3), "I'm Walking Behind You" (1), "Wish You Were Here" (8)
Winifred Atwell	1	"Britannia Rag"	5	—
The Mills Brothers	1	"The Glow-Worm"	10	—
Perry Como	1	"Don't Let the Stars Get in Your Eyes"	1	—
The Ramblers	1	"Don't Let the Stars Get in Your Eyes"	1	—
Ted Heath & His Music	2	"Hot Toddy"	6	"Dragnet" (9) ^{[A]}
The Stargazers	1	"Broken Wings"	1	—
Art and Dotty Todd	1	"Broken Wings"	6	—
Dickie Valentine	2	"All the Time and Everywhere"	9	"In a Golden Coach (There's a Heart of Gold)" (7)
Danny Kaye	1	"Wonderful Copenhagen"	5	—
Lita Roza	1	"(How Much Is) That Doggie in the Window?"	1	—
Patti Page	1	"(How Much Is) That Doggie in the Window?"	9	—
The Johnston Brothers	1	"Oh Happy Day"	4	—
Frank Chacksfield	2	"Little Red Monkey"	10	"Terry's Theme from Limelight" (2)
Billy Cotton & His Band	1	"In a Golden Coach (There's a Heart of Gold)"	3	—
Jimmy Boyd	2	"Tell Me a Story"	5	"I Saw Mommy Kissing Santa Claus" (3)
Muriel Smith	1	"Hold Me, Thrill Me, Kiss Me"	3	—
Ron Goodwin	1	"Terry's Theme from Limelight"	3	—
Sally Sweetland	1	"I'm Walking Behind You"	1	—
Gisele MacKenzie	1	"Seven Lonely Days"	6	—
June Hutton	1	"Say You're Mine Again"	6	—
Axel Stordahl	1	"Say You're Mine Again"	6	—
The Boys Next Door	1	"Say You're Mine Again"	6	—
Jimmy Young	1	"Eternally"	8	—
Dean Martin	1	"Kiss"	5	—
David Whitfield	2	"The Bridge of Sighs"	9	"Answer Me" (1)
Diana Decker	1	"Poppa Piccolino (Papaveri e papere)"	10	—
Les Paul	1	Vaya con Dios"	7	—
Mary Ford	1	Vaya con Dios"	7	—
Lee Lawrence	1	"Crying in the Chapel"	7	—
The Beverley Sisters	1	"I Saw Mommy Kissing Santa Claus"	6	—
Ray Anthony and His Orchestra	1	"Dragnet"	7	—
Joan Regan	1	"Ricochet"	8	—
The Squadronaires	1	"Ricochet"	8	—
Eddie Calvert	1	"Oh Mein Papa" ^{[C]}	1	—

=== Songs from films ===
Original songs from various films entered the top 10 throughout the year. These included "Terry's Theme" (from Limelight), "The Song from the Moulin Rouge (Where Is Your Heart)" (Moulin Rouge), "Swedish Rhapsody" (The Stranger Left No Card) and "Chicka Boom" (Those Redheads from Seattle).

=== Best-selling singles ===
Until 1970 there was no universally recognised year-end best-sellers list. However, in 2011 the Official Charts Company released a list of the best-selling single of each year in chart history from 1952 to date. According to the list, "I Believe" by Frankie Laine is officially recorded as the biggest-selling single of 1953.

== Top-ten singles ==
Key

Symbol	Meaning
‡	Single peaked in 1952 but still in chart in 1953.
♦	Single released in 1953 but peaked in 1954.
(#)	Year-end best-selling single.
Entered	The date that the single first appeared in the chart.
Peak	Highest position that the single reached in the UK Singles Chart.

Entered (week ending)	Weeks in top 10	Single	Artist	Peak	Peak reached (week ending)	Weeks at peak
Singles in 1952
14 November 1952	16	"Here in My Heart" ‡	Al Martino	1	14 November 1952	9
14 November 1952	16	"You Belong to Me"	Jo Stafford	1	16 January 1953	1
14 November 1952	6	"Somewhere Along the Way" ‡	Nat King Cole	3	14 November 1952	1
14 November 1952	11	"Isle of Innisfree" ‡	Bing Crosby	3	12 December 1952	3
14 November 1952	10	"Feet Up (Pat Him on the Po-Po)" ‡	Guy Mitchell	2	21 November 1952	1
14 November 1952	9	"Half as Much" ‡	Rosemary Clooney	3	21 November 1952	3
14 November 1952	6	"Forget Me Not" ‡	Vera Lynn	5	12 December 1952	1
14 November 1952	7	"Sugar Bush" ‡	Doris Day & Frankie Laine	8	14 November 1952	3
21 November 1952	22	"Because You're Mine" ‡	Mario Lanza	3	5 December 1952	3
5 December 1952	14	"Comes A-Long A-Love"	Kay Starr	1	23 January 1953	1
19 December 1952	3	"White Christmas" ‡	Mantovani	6	19 December 1952	2
19 December 1952	3	"Because You're Mine" ‡ ^{[F]}	Nat King Cole	6	19 December 1952	2
19 December 1952	3	"Faith Can Move Mountains" ‡ ^{[G]}	Johnnie Ray & The Four Lads	7	19 December 1952	2
19 December 1952	2	"Silent Night, Holy Night" ‡	Bing Crosby	8	19 December 1952	2
19 December 1952	10	"Takes Two to Tango"	Louis Armstrong	6	23 January 1953	1
19 December 1952	4	"Walkin' to Missouri" ^{[H]}	Tony Brent	7	9 January 1953	1
Singles in 1953
2 January 1953	6	"Cowpuncher's Cantata" ^{[D]}	Max Bygraves	6	23 January 1953	1
9 January 1953	15	"Outside of Heaven" ^{[J]}	Eddie Fisher	1	30 January 1953	1
9 January 1953	3	"Britannia Rag"	Winifred Atwell	5	23 January 1953	1
9 January 1953	1	"The Glow-Worm"	The Mills Brothers	10	9 January 1953	1
16 January 1953	4	"Make It Soon" ^{[K]}	Tony Brent	9	16 January 1953	3
16 January 1953	15	"Don't Let the Stars Get in Your Eyes"	Perry Como & The Ramblers	1	6 February 1953	5
30 January 1953	12	"Now"	Al Martino	3	20 March 1953	2
6 February 1953	3	"Everything I Have Is Yours"	Eddie Fisher	8	6 February 1953	1
6 February 1953	1	"Faith Can Move Mountains"	Nat King Cole	10	6 February 1953	1
13 February 1953	14	"She Wears Red Feathers"	Guy Mitchell	1	13 March 1953	4
20 February 1953	5	"Broken Wings"	Art and Dotty Todd	6	27 March 1953	2
27 February 1953	10	"Wonderful Copenhagen"	Danny Kaye	5	10 April 1953	1
6 March 1953	9	"Broken Wings" ^{[N]}	The Stargazers	1	10 April 1953	1
13 March 1953	11	"(How Much Is) That Doggie in the Window?"	Lita Roza	1	17 April 1953	1
20 March 1953	2	"All the Time and Everywhere"	Dickie Valentine	9	20 March 1953	1
27 March 1953	2	"(How Much Is) That Doggie in the Window?"	Patti Page	9	27 March 1953	2
3 April 1953	8	"Oh Happy Day"	The Johnston Brothers	4	1 May 1953	2
3 April 1953	1	"Little Red Monkey"	Frank Chacksfield's Tunesmiths	10	3 April 1953	1
10 April 1953	5	"Somebody Stole My Gal" ^{[O]}	Johnnie Ray	6	10 April 1953	2
10 April 1953	35	"I Believe" (#1)	Frankie Laine	1	24 April 1953	18
24 April 1953	9	"Pretty Little Black Eyed Susie"	Guy Mitchell	2	1 May 1953	1
24 April 1953	3	"Side by Side"	Kay Starr	7	1 May 1953	1
24 April 1953	18	"Pretend"	Nat King Cole	2	8 May 1953	5
1 May 1953	14	"Downhearted"	Eddie Fisher	3	22 May 1953	2
8 May 1953	12	"Tell Me a Story" ^{[P]}	Jimmy Boyd & Frankie Laine	5	15 May 1953	2
8 May 1953	7	"In a Golden Coach (There's a Heart of Gold)"	Billy Cotton & His Band	3	5 June 1953	1
22 May 1953	17	"I'm Walking Behind You"	Eddie Fisher with Sally Sweetland	1	26 June 1953	1
22 May 1953	15	"Hold Me, Thrill Me, Kiss Me"	Muriel Smith	3	19 June 1953	4
22 May 1953	23	"Terry's Theme from Limelight"	Frank Chacksfield	2	5 June 1953	8
29 May 1953	22	"The Song from the Moulin Rouge"	Mantovani	1	14 August 1953	1
5 June 1953	2	"Coronation Rag"	Winifred Atwell	5	5 June 1953	1
5 June 1953	1	"In a Golden Coach (There's a Heart of Gold)"	Dickie Valentine	7	5 June 1953	1
5 June 1953	18	"Terry's Theme from Limelight"	Ron Goodwin	3	7 August 1953	2
10 July 1953	2	"Rachel" ^{[S]}	Al Martino	10	10 July 1953	2
24 July 1953	8	"Hot Toddy"	Ted Heath & His Music	6	14 August 1953	2
31 July 1953	13	"Let's Walk That-a-Way"	Doris Day & Johnnie Ray	4	28 August 1953	7
7 August 1953	5	"Say You're Mine Again" ^{[U]}	June Hutton & Axel Stordahl with The Boys Next Door	6	18 September 1953	1
14 August 1953	5	"Can't I?" ^{[V]}	Nat King Cole	6	25 September 1953	2
21 August 1953	3	"Eternally"	Jimmy Young	8	4 September 1953	1
21 August 1953	3	"Seven Lonely Days" ^{[T]}	Gisele MacKenzie	6	28 August 1953	1
28 August 1953	14	"Look at That Girl"	Guy Mitchell	1	11 September 1953	6
11 September 1953	10	"Where the Winds Blow"	Frankie Laine	2	2 October 1953	1
18 September 1953	5	"Mother Nature and Father Time"	Nat King Cole	7	16 October 1953	1
18 September 1953	7	"Kiss"	Dean Martin	5	23 October 1953	1
2 October 1953	1	"The Bridge of Sighs"	David Whitfield	9	2 October 1953	1
9 October 1953	1	"Flirtation Waltz"	Winifred Atwell	10	9 October 1953	1
16 October 1953	8	"Hey Joe!"	Frankie Laine	1	23 October 1953	2
23 October 1953	17	"Swedish Rhapsody" ^{[Z]}	Mantovani	2	4 December 1953	2
23 October 1953	12	"Answer Me" ^{[Y]}	David Whitfield	1	6 November 1953	2
23 October 1953	9	"Poppa Piccolino" ^{[AA]}	Diana Decker	2	11 December 1953	1
30 October 1953	17	"Answer Me"	Frankie Laine	1	13 November 1953	8
6 November 1953	14	"Chicka Boom" ♦	Guy Mitchell	4	29 January 1954	1
20 November 1953	4	"Vaya con Dios"	Les Paul & Mary Ford	7	20 November 1953	1
20 November 1953	2	"Wish You Were Here"	Eddie Fisher	8	20 November 1953	1
27 November 1953	6	"I Saw Mommy Kissing Santa Claus"	Jimmy Boyd	3	4 December 1953	1
27 November 1953	1	"Dragnet"	Ted Heath & His Music	9	27 November 1953	1
4 December 1953	1	"Dragnet"	Ray Anthony & His Orchestra	7	4 December 1953	1
4 December 1953	9	"Let's Have a Party" ♦	Winifred Atwell	2	15 January 1954	1
4 December 1953	4	"Swedish Rhapsody" ^{[FF]}	Ray Martin	4	18 December 1953	3
11 December 1953	4	"I Saw Mommy Kissing Santa Claus"	The Beverley Sisters	6	11 December 1953	1
11 December 1953	5	"Crying in the Chapel"	Lee Lawrence	7	11 December 1953	1
11 December 1953	3	"Ricochet"	Joan Regan with The Squadronaires	8	11 December 1953	1
18 December 1953	20	"Oh Mein Papa" ♦	Eddie Calvert	1	8 January 1954	9

== Entries by artist ==
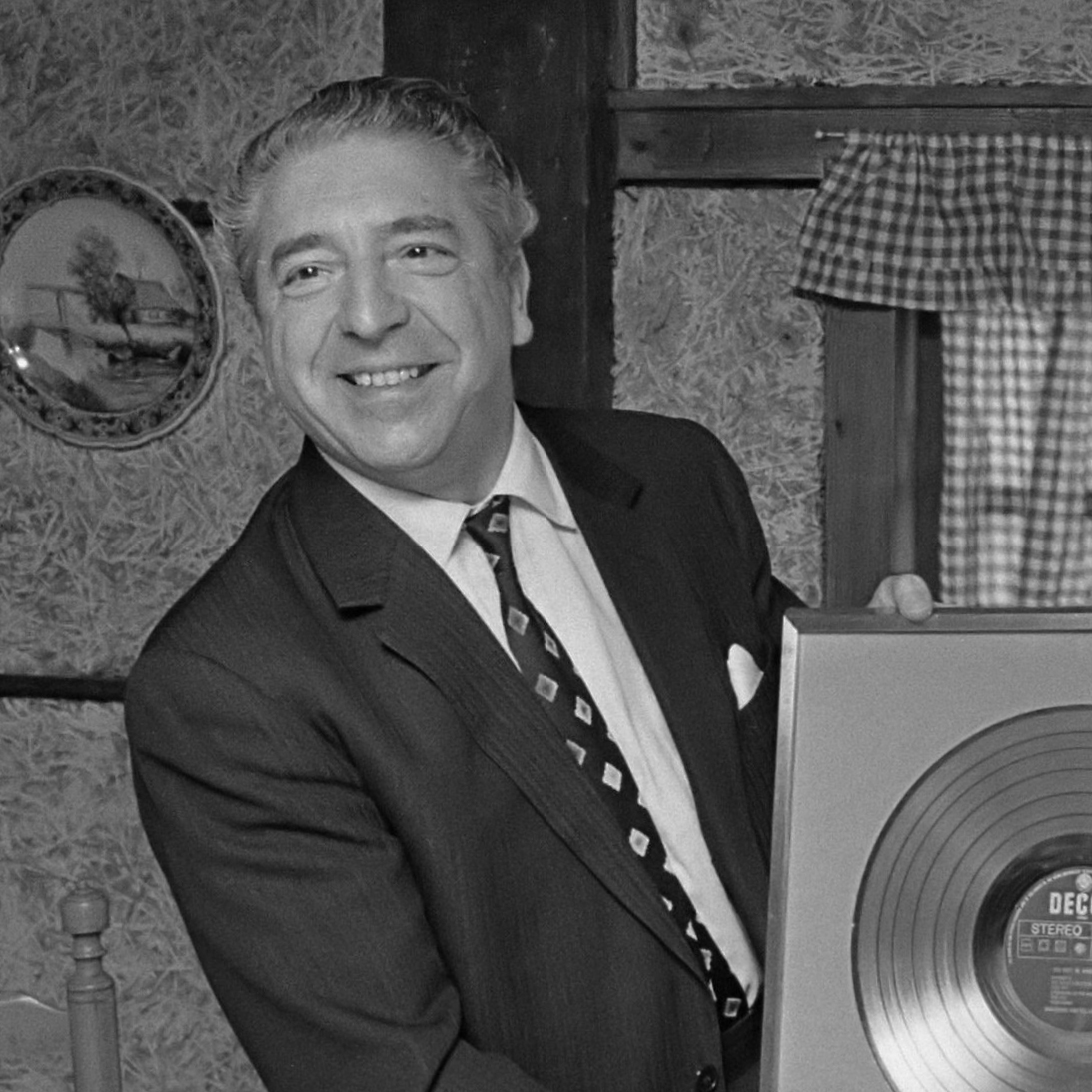
Mantovani (pictured in 1970) had three top 10 singles this year, including the number-one hit "The Song from the Moulin Rouge", which stayed in the top 10 for 22 weeks.

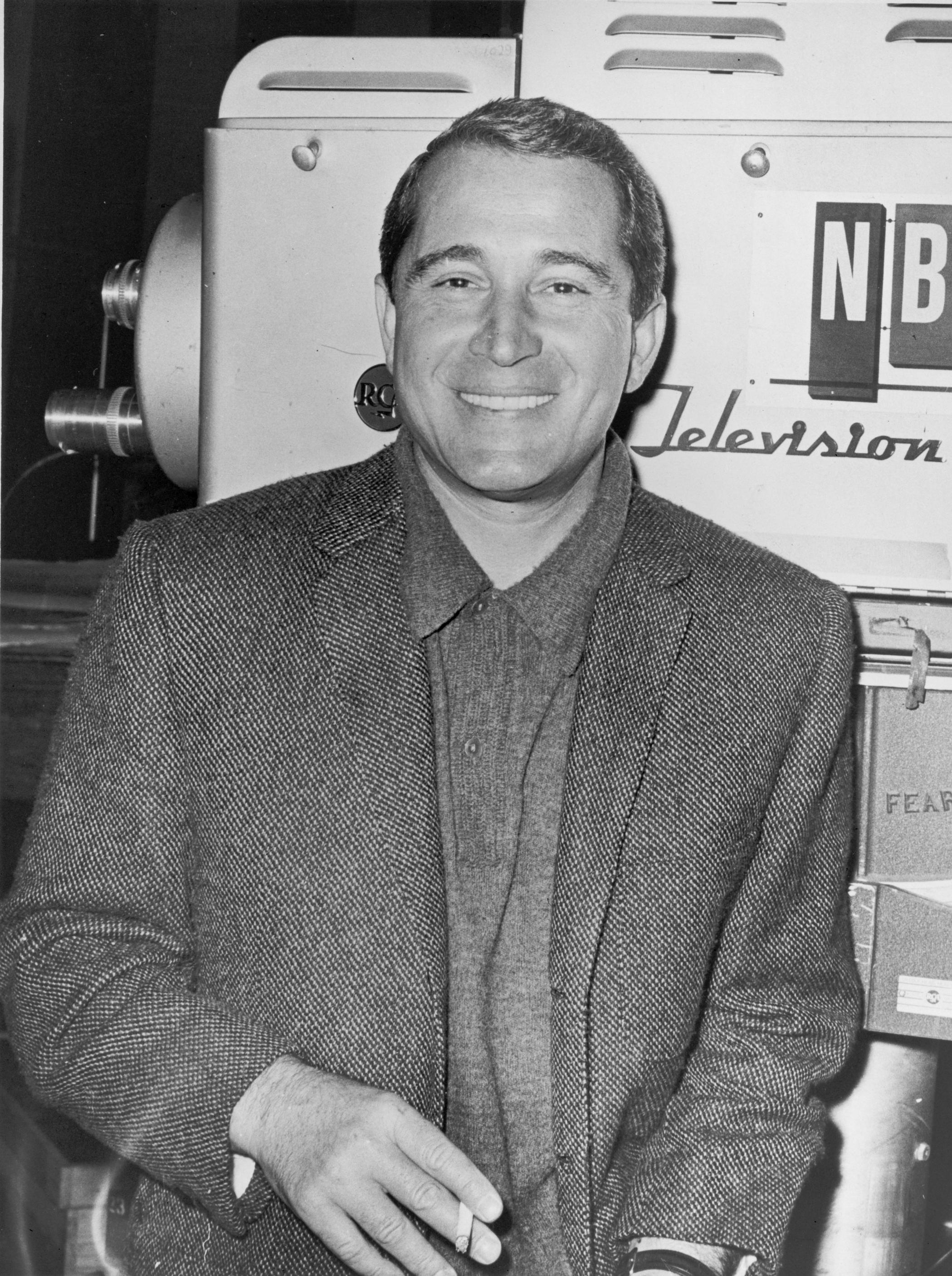
Perry Como entered the UK top 10 for the first time in 1953 with "Don't Let the Stars Get in Your Eyes", which spent five weeks at number-one.

The following table shows artists who achieved two or more top 10 entries in 1953, including singles that reached their peak in 1952 or 1954. The figures include both main artists and featured artists, while appearances on ensemble charity records are also counted for each artist. The total number of weeks an artist spent in the top 10 in 1953 is also shown.

Entries	Artist	Weeks	Singles
6	Frankie Laine ^{[II]}	81	"Answer Me", "Hey Joe!", "I Believe", "Sugar Bush", "Tell Me a Story", "Where the Winds Blow"
6	Guy Mitchell ^{[II]}^{[JJ]}	55	"Chicka Boom", "Cloud Lucky Seven", "Feet Up", "Look at That Girl", "Pretty Little Black Eyed Susie", "She Wears Red Feathers"
6	Nat King Cole ^{[II]}	41	"Because You're Mine", "Can't I?", "Faith Can Move Mountains", "Mother Nature and Father Time", "Pretend", "Somewhere Along the Way"
5	Eddie Fisher	45	"Downhearted", "Everything I Have Is Yours", "I'm Walking Behind You", "Outside of Heaven", "Wish You Were Here"
4	Winifred Atwell ^{[JJ]}^{[KK]}	18	"Britannia Rag", "Coronation Rag", "Flirtation Waltz", "Let's Have a Party"
3	Al Martino ^{[II]}	29	"Here in My Heart", "Now", "Rachel"
3	Johnnie Ray ^{[II]}	23	"Faith Can Move Mountains", "Let's Walk That-a-Way", "Somebody Stole My Gal"
3	Mantovani ^{[II]}	35	"Swedish Rhapsody", "The Song from the Moulin Rouge", "White Christmas"
2	Bing Crosby ^{[II]}	7	"Isle of Innisfree", "Silent Night, Holy Night"
2	David Whitfield ^{[JJ]}	13	"Answer Me", "The Bridge of Sighs"
2	Dickie Valentine	5	"All the Time and Everywhere", "In a Golden Coach (There's a Heart of Gold)"
2	Doris Day	16	"Let's Walk That-a-Way", "Sugar Bush"
2	Frank Chacksfield	27	"Little Red Monkey", "Terry's Theme from Limelight"
2	Jimmy Boyd	21	"I Saw Mommy Kissing Santa Claus", "Tell Me a Story"
2	Kay Starr ^{[KK]}	17	"Comes A-Long A-Love", "Side by Side"
2	Ted Heath & His Music	17	"Dragnet", "Hot Toddy"
2	Tony Brent ^{[KK]}	14	"Make It Soon", "Walkin' to Missouri"

== Notes ==
- ^{a} "Dragnet" reached its peak of number seven on 14 January 1954 (week ending).
- ^{b} "Rags to Riches" reached its peak of number three on 14 January 1954 (week ending).
- ^{c} "Oh Mein Papa" reached its peak of number one on 14 January 1954 (week ending).
- ^{d} "Cowpuncher's Cantanta" re-entered the top 12 at number 8 on 8 January 1953; at number 6 on 29 January 1953 (week ending) for 5 weeks and at number 10 on 12 March 1953 (week ending).
- ^{e} "Britannia Rag" re-entered the top 12 at number 12 on 15 January 1953 (week ending) for 5 weeks.
- ^{f} "Because You're Mine" (Nat King Cole version) re-entered the top 12 at number 10 on 29 January 1953 (week ending) and at number 11 on 19 February 1953 (week ending).
- ^{g} "Faith Can Move Mountains" (Johnnie Ray and The Four Lads version) re-entered the top 12 at number 9 on 15 January 1953 (week ending).
- ^{h} "Walkin' to Missouri" re-entered the top 12 at number 7 on 15 January 1953 (week ending) for 5 weeks
- ^{i} "Faith Can Move Mountains" (Nat King Cole version) re-entered the top 12 at number 12 on 22 January 1953 (week ending) for 2 weeks and at number 10 on 12 February 1953 (week ending).
- ^{j} "Outside of Heaven" re-entered the top 12 at number 12 on 7 May 1953 (week ending).
- ^{k} "Make It Soon" re-entered the top 12 at number 10 on 19 March 1953 (week ending) for 3 weeks.
- ^{l} "Everything I Have Is Yours" re-entered the top 12 at number 8 on 12 February 1953 (week ending) for 4 weeks.
- ^{m} "She Wears Red Feathers" re-entered the top 12 at number 12 on 18 June 1953 (week ending).
- ^{n} "Broken Wings" (Stargazers version) re-entered the top 12 at number 12 on 5 March 1953 (week ending) for 11 weeks.
- ^{o} "Somebody Stole My Gal" re-entered the top 12 at number 7 on 30 April 1953 (week ending) for 4 weeks; at number 12 on 4 June 1953 (week ending) and at number 11 on 13 August 1953 (week ending).
- ^{p} "Tell Me a Story" re-entered the top 12 at number 12 on 17 September 1953 (week ending).
- ^{q} "Coronation Rag" re-entered the top 12 at number 12 on 4 June 1953 (week ending) for 5 weeks.
- ^{r} "The Song from the Moulin Rouge (Where Is Your Heart)" re-entered the top 12 at number 10 on 19 November 1953 (week ending) and at number 12 on 10 December 1953 (week ending).
- ^{s} "Rachel" re-entered the top 12 at number 12 on 17 September 1953 (week ending).
- ^{t} "Seven Lonely Days" re-entered the top 12 at number 11 in August 1953 (week ending) and at number 10 on 27 August 1953 (week ending) for 4 weeks.
- ^{u} "Say You're Mine Again" re-entered the top 12 at number 7 on 10 September 1953 (week ending) for 4 weeks.
- ^{v} "Can't I" re-entered the top 12 at number 11 on 24 September 1953 (week ending) for 4 weeks and at number 10 on 5 November 1953 (week ending).
- ^{w} "Kiss" re-entered the top 12 at number 7 on 8 October 1953 (week ending) for 7 weeks.
- ^{x} "Flirtation Waltz" re-entered the top 12 at number 19 on 15 October 1953 (week ending) and at number 12 on 12 November 1953 (week ending).
- ^{y} "Answer Me" (David Whitfield version) re-entered the top 12 at number 12 on 4 February 1954 (week ending).
- ^{z} "Swedish Rhapsody" (Mantovani version) re-entered the top 12 at number 12 on 4 March 1954 (week ending).
- ^{aa} "Poppa Piccolino (Papaveri e papere)" re-entered the top 12 at number 5 on 14 January 1954 (week ending) for 2 weeks.
- ^{bb} "Dragnet" (Ted Heath and His Music version) re-entered the top 12 at number 9 on 3 December 1953 (week ending); at number 11 on 17 December 1953 (week ending); at number 11 on 21 January 1954 (week ending) and at number 12 on 11 February 1954 (week ending).
- ^{cc} "Chicka Boom" re-entered the top 12 at number 8 on 21 January 1954 (week ending) for 6 weeks.
- ^{dd} "Crying in the Chapel" re-entered the top 12 at number 7 on 17 December 1953 (week ending) for 5 weeks.
- ^{ee} "I Saw Mommy Kissing Santa Claus" (The Beverley Sisters version) re-entered the top 12 at number 6 on 17 December 1953 (week ending) for 4 weeks.
- ^{ff} "Swedish Rhapsody" (Ray Martin version) re-entered the top 12 at number 4 on 24 December 1953 (week ending) for 3 weeks.
- ^{gg} "Ricochet" re-entered the top 12 at number 12 on 14 January 1954 (week ending) for 4 weeks.
- ^{hh} "Rags to Riches" re-entered the top 12 at number 3 on 14 January 1954 (week ending) for 10 weeks.
- ^{ii} Figure includes single that peaked in 1952.
- ^{jj} Figure includes single that peaked in 1954.
- ^{kk} Figures includes single that first charted in 1952 but peaked in 1953.

== See also ==
- 1953 in British music
- List of number-one singles from the 1950s (UK)
