= List of UK top-ten singles in 1954 =

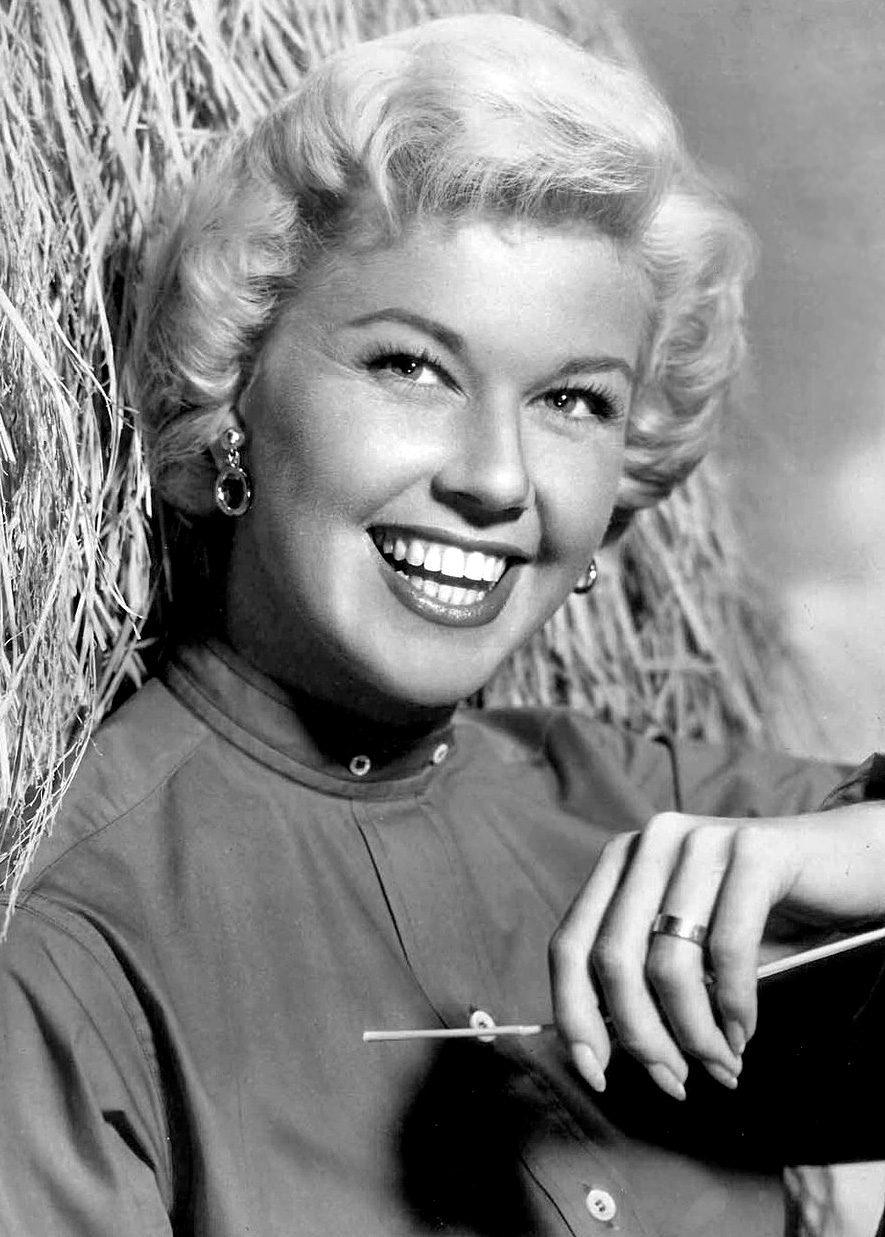
Doris Day had the biggest-selling single of 1954 with the Academy Award-winning song from Calamity Jane, "Secret Love", which spent nine non-consecutive weeks at number-one. Day secured a further two top 10 entries during the year.

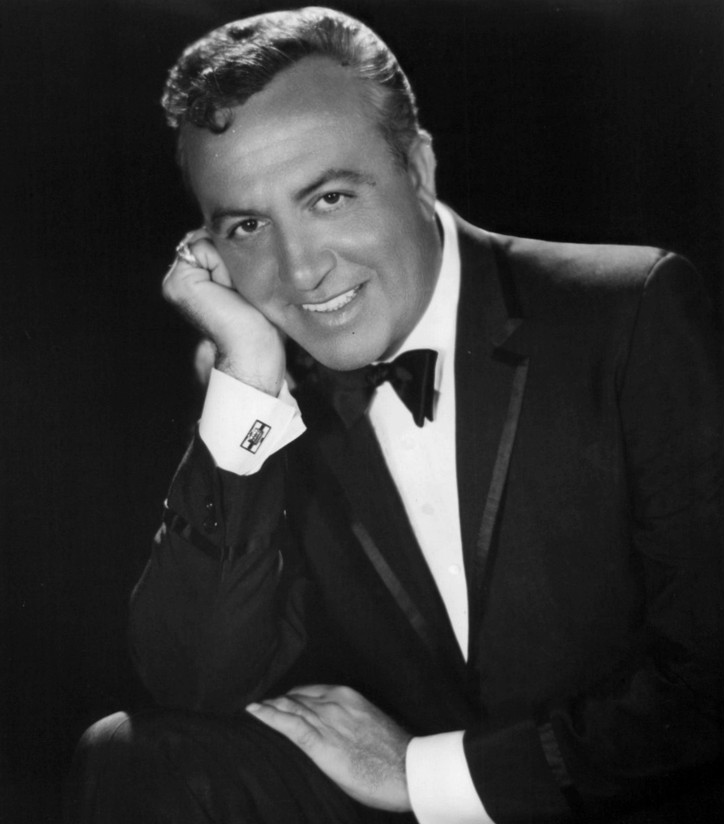
Don Cornell achieved his only UK top 10 single this year with the Oscar-nominated song "Hold My Hand", which spent five non-consecutive weeks at number-one.

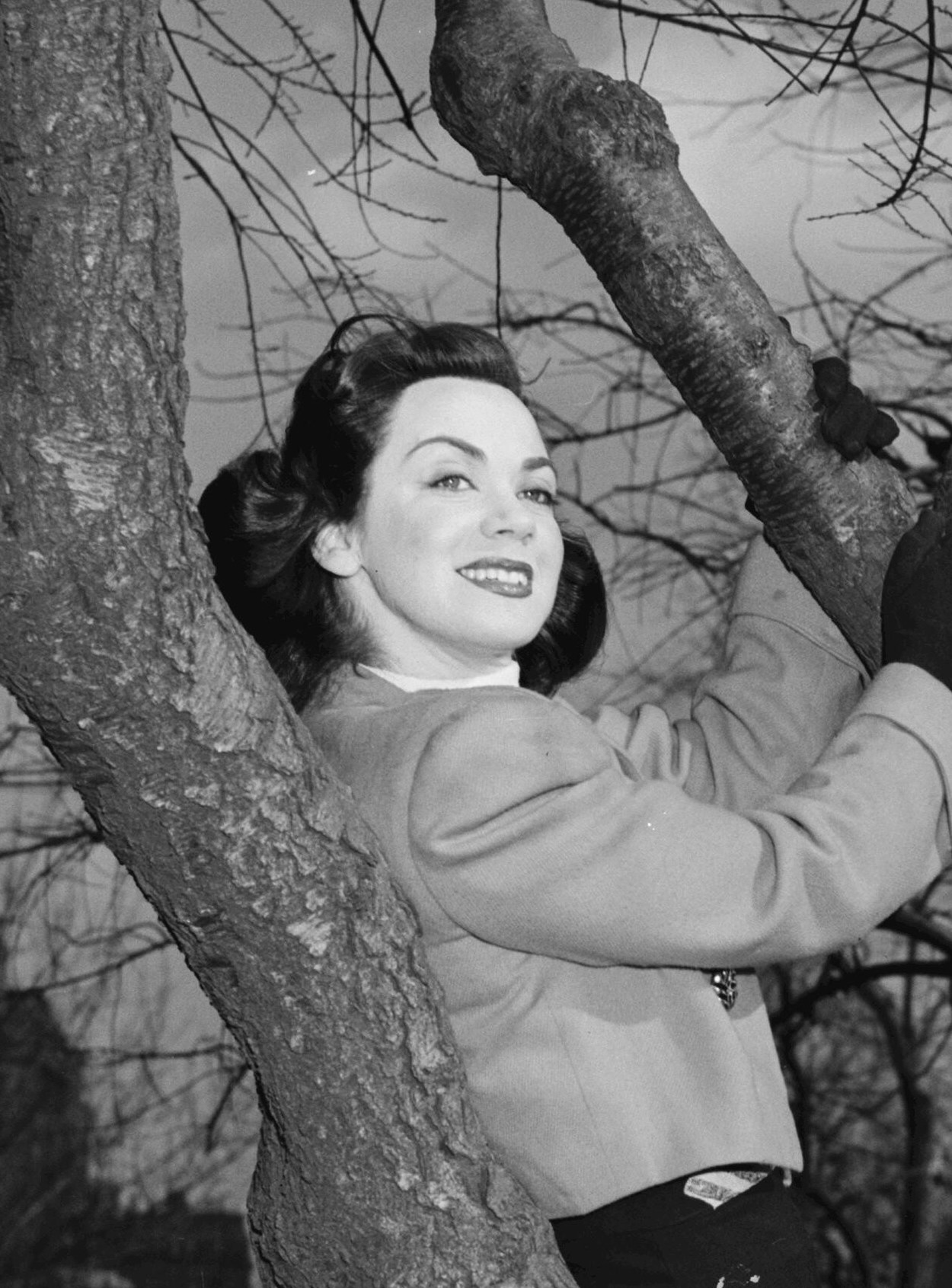
Kitty Kallen became a one-hit wonder in the UK charts in 1954 with her number-one hit "Little Things Mean a Lot", which stayed in the top 10 for 20 consecutive weeks.

The UK Singles Chart is one of many music charts compiled by the Official Charts Company that calculates the best-selling singles of the week in the United Kingdom. Before 2004, the chart was only based on the sales of physical singles. New Musical Express (NME) magazine had published the United Kingdom record charts for the first time in 1952. NME originally published only a top 12 (although the first chart had a couple of singles that were tied so a top 15 was announced) but this was gradually extended to encompass a top 20 by October 1954. This list shows singles that peaked in the top 10 of the UK Singles Chart during 1954, as well as singles which peaked in 1953 and 1955 but were in the top 10 in 1954. The entry date is when the single appeared in the top 10 for the first time (week ending, as published by the Official Charts Company, which is six days after the chart is announced).

Seventy-three singles were in the top ten in 1954. Twelve singles from 1953 remained in the top 10 for several weeks at the beginning of the year, while "No One But You" by Billy Eckstine, "The Finger of Suspicion (Points at You)" by Dickie Valentine with The Stargazers and "Heartbeat" by Ruby Murray were all released in 1954 but did not reach their peak until 1955. "Chicka Boom" and "Cloud Lucky Seven" by Guy Mitchell and "Let's Have a Party" by Winifred Atwell were the singles from 1953 to reach their peak in 1954. Nineteen artists scored multiple entries in the top 10 in 1954. Alma Cogan, Petula Clark, Frank Sinatra and Ruby Murray were among the many artists who achieved their first UK charting top 10 single in 1954.

The 1953 Christmas number-one, "Answer Me" by Frankie Laine, remained at number-one for the first week of 1954. The first new number-one single of the year was "Oh Mein Papa" by Eddie Calvert. Overall, eleven different singles peaked at number-one in 1954, with eleven unique artists hitting that position.

== Background ==
=== Multiple entries ===
Seventy-six singles charted in the top 10 in 1954, with sixty-four singles reaching their peak this year. Ten songs were recorded by several artists with each version reaching the top 10:

- "Answer Me" – David Whitfield, Frankie Laine (both peaked 1953)
- "Changing Partners" – Bing Crosby, Kay Starr
- "I Saw Mommy Kissing Santa Claus" – The Beverley Sisters, Jimmy Boyd (both peaked 1953)
- "If I Give My Heart to You" – Doris Day with The Mellomen, Joan Regan
- "Oh Mein Papa" – Eddie Calvert, Eddie Fisher (version known as "Oh! My Papa")
- "Skin Deep" – Duke Ellington, Ted Heath and His Music
- "Swedish Rhapsody" – Mantovani, Ray Martin (both peaked 1953)
- "This Ole House" – Billie Anthony, Rosemary Clooney
- "Three Coins in the Fountain" – The Four Aces, Frank Sinatra
- "Wanted" – Al Martino, Perry Como

Nineteen artists scored multiple entries in the top 10 in 1954. American Frankie Laine secured the record for most top 10 hits in 1954 with seven hit singles.

Rosemary Clooney was one of a number of artists with two top 10 entries, including the number-one single "This Ole House". Al Martino, Billy Cotton and His Band, Dean Martin and Max Bygraves were among the other artists who had multiple top 10 entries in 1954.

=== Chart debuts ===
Twenty artists achieved their first top 10 single in 1954, either as a lead or featured artist.

The following table (collapsed on desktop site) does not include acts who had previously charted as part of a group and secured their first top 10 solo single.

| Artist | Number of top 10s | First entry | Chart position | Other entries |
|---|---|---|---|---|
| Ken Mackintosh | 1 | "The Creep" | 10 | — |
| The Obernkirchen Children's Choir | 1 | "The Happy Wanderer (Der fröhliche Wanderer)" | 2 | — |
| Bonnie Lou | 1 | "Tennessee Wig Walk" | 4 | — |
| José Ferrer | 1 | "Man (Uh-huh)"/"Woman (Uh-huh)" | 7 | — |
| Norman Wisdom | 1 | "Don't Laugh at Me ('cause I'm a Fool)" | 3 | — |
| Duke Ellington | 1 | "Skin Deep" | 7 | — |
| Alma Cogan | 2 | "Bell Bottom Blues" | 4 | — |
| Ruby Wright | 1 | "Bimbo" | 7 | — |
| The Four Knights | 1 | "Oh Baby Mine (I Get So Lonely)" | 5 | — |
| Petula Clark | 1 | "The Little Shoemaker (Le petit cordonnier)" | 7 | — |
| Kitty Kallen | 1 | "Little Things Mean a Lot" | 1 | — |
| Frank Sinatra | 1 | "Three Coins in the Fountain" | 1 | — |
| The Four Aces | 1 | "Three Coins in the Fountain" | 5 | — |
| Don Cornell | 1 | "Hold My Hand" | 1 | — |
| The Mellomen | 1 | "If I Give My Heart to You" | 4 | — |
| Billie Anthony | 1 | "This Ole House" | 4 | — |
| Billy Eckstine | 1 | "No One But You" ^{[A]} | 3 | — |
| Ronnie Hilton | 1 | "I Still Believe" | 3 | — |
| The Big Ben Banjo Band | 1 | "Let's Get Together No. 1" | 6 | — |
| Ruby Murray | 1 | "Heartbeat" ^{[B]} | 3 | — |

=== Songs from films ===
Original songs from various films entered the top 10 throughout the year. These included "Blowing Wild (The Ballad of Black Gold)" (from Blowing Wild), "That's Amore" (from The Caddy) "Secret Love" and "The Black Hills of Dakota" (Calamity Jane), "Three Coins in the Fountain" (Three Coins in the Fountain) and "Hold My Hand" (Susan Slept Here).

=== Best-selling singles ===
Until 1970 there was no universally recognised year-end best-sellers list. However, in 2011 the Official Charts Company released a list of the best-selling single of each year in chart history from 1952 to date. According to the list, "Secret Love" by Doris Day is officially recorded as the biggest-selling single of 1954.

== Top-ten singles ==
Key

| Symbol | Meaning |
|---|---|
| ‡ | Single peaked in 1953 but still in chart in 1954. |
| ♦ | Single released in 1954 but peaked in 1955. |
| (#) | Year-end best-selling single. |
| Entered | The date that the single first appeared in the chart. |
| Peak | Highest position that the single reached in the UK Singles Chart. |

| Entered (week ending) | Weeks in top 10 | Single | Artist | Peak | Peak reached (week ending) | Weeks at peak |
Singles in 1953
| 23 October 1953 | 17 | "Swedish Rhapsody" ‡ | Mantovani | 2 | 4 December 1953 | 2 |
| 23 October 1953 | 12 | "Answer Me" ‡ | David Whitfield | 1 | 6 November 1953 | 2 |
| 23 October 1953 | 9 | "Poppa Piccolino" ‡ ^{[C]} | Diana Decker | 2 | 11 December 1953 | 1 |
| 30 October 1953 | 17 | "Answer Me" ‡ | Frankie Laine | 1 | 13 November 1953 | 8 |
| 6 November 1953 | 14 | "Chicka Boom" ^{[D]} | Guy Mitchell | 4 | 29 January 1954 | 1 |
| 27 November 1953 | 6 | "I Saw Mommy Kissing Santa Claus" ‡ | Jimmy Boyd | 3 | 4 December 1953 | 1 |
| 4 December 1953 | 9 | "Let's Have a Party" | Winifred Atwell | 2 | 15 January 1954 | 1 |
| 4 December 1953 | 4 | "Swedish Rhapsody" ‡ ^{[E]} | Ray Martin | 4 | 18 December 1953 | 3 |
| 11 December 1953 | 5 | "I Saw Mommy Kissing Santa Claus" ‡ | The Beverley Sisters | 6 | 11 December 1953 | 1 |
| 11 December 1953 | 5 | "Crying in the Chapel" ‡ | Lee Lawrence | 7 | 11 December 1953 | 1 |
| 11 December 1953 | 3 | "Ricochet" ‡ | Joan Regan with The Squadronaires | 8 | 11 December 1953 | 1 |
| 18 December 1953 | 20 | "Oh Mein Papa" | Eddie Calvert | 1 | 8 January 1954 | 9 |
Singles in 1954
| 8 January 1954 | 9 | "Rags to Riches" | David Whitfield | 3 | 8 January 1954 | 3 |
| 8 January 1954 | 11 | "Blowing Wild (The Ballad of Black Gold)" | Frankie Laine | 2 | 15 January 1954 | 6 |
| 8 January 1954 | 12 | "Cloud Lucky Seven" | Guy Mitchell | 2 | 12 February 1954 | 1 |
| 22 January 1954 | 2 | "Oh! My Papa" ^{[F]} | Eddie Fisher | 9 | 22 January 1954 | 1 |
| 22 January 1954 | 24 | "The Happy Wanderer" | The Obernkirchen Children's Choir | 2 | 19 March 1954 | 5 |
| 29 January 1954 | 9 | "That's Amore" | Dean Martin | 2 | 19 February 1954 | 1 |
| 29 January 1954 | 1 | "The Creep" | Ken Mackintosh | 10 | 29 January 1954 | 1 |
| 5 February 1954 | 9 | "Tennessee Wig Walk" | Bonnie Lou | 4 | 12 February 1954 | 4 |
| 12 February 1954 | 1 | "Ebb Tide" | Frank Chacksfield | 9 | 12 February 1954 | 1 |
| 12 February 1954 | 3 | "Man (Uh-huh)"/"Woman (Uh-huh)" | Rosemary Clooney & José Ferrer | 7 | 19 February 1954 | 2 |
| 19 February 1954 | 15 | "Don't Laugh at Me ('cause I'm a Fool)" | Norman Wisdom | 3 | 9 April 1954 | 1 |
| 19 February 1954 | 1 | "The Cuff of My Shirt" | Guy Mitchell | 9 | 19 February 1954 | 1 |
| 19 February 1954 | 1 | "Skin Deep" | Ted Heath & His Music | 9 | 19 February 1954 | 1 |
| 19 February 1954 | 9 | "The Book" | David Whitfield | 5 | 26 March 1954 | 2 |
| 26 February 1954 | 13 | "I See the Moon" | The Stargazers | 1 | 12 March 1954 | 6 |
| 5 March 1954 | 4 | "Skin Deep" | Duke Ellington | 7 | 12 March 1954 | 1 |
| 19 March 1954 | 14 | "Changing Partners" | Kay Starr | 4 | 9 April 1954 | 3 |
| 19 March 1954 | 2 | "Changing Partners" | Bing Crosby | 9 | 2 April 1954 | 1 |
| 19 March 1954 | 8 | "Bell Bottom Blues" | Alma Cogan | 4 | 2 April 1954 | 1 |
| 26 March 1954 | 2 | "Granada" | Frankie Laine | 9 | 9 April 1954 | 1 |
| 2 April 1954 | 27 | "Secret Love" (#1) | Doris Day | 1 | 16 April 1954 | 9 |
| 9 April 1954 | 17 | "Such a Night" | Johnnie Ray | 1 | 30 April 1954 | 1 |
| 16 April 1954 | 9 | "The Kid's Last Fight" | Frankie Laine | 3 | 30 April 1954 | 2 |
| 16 April 1954 | 1 | "Tenderly" | Nat King Cole | 10 | 16 April 1954 | 1 |
| 23 April 1954 | 2 | "Bimbo" | Ruby Wright | 7 | 7 May 1954 | 1 |
| 30 April 1954 | 4 | "A Dime and a Dollar" | Guy Mitchell | 8 | 30 April 1954 | 2 |
| 7 May 1954 | 1 | "Make Love to Me" | Jo Stafford | 8 | 7 May 1954 | 1 |
| 14 May 1954 | 9 | "Friends and Neighbours" | Billy Cotton & His Band | 3 | 21 May 1954 | 5 |
| 14 May 1954 | 7 | "Someone Else's Roses" | Joan Regan | 5 | 4 June 1954 | 2 |
| 21 May 1954 | 6 | "The Gang That Sang Heart of My Heart" | Max Bygraves | 7 | 28 May 1954 | 2 |
| 4 June 1954 | 8 | "Oh Baby Mine (I Get So Lonely)" | The Four Knights | 5 | 25 June 1954 | 1 |
| 11 June 1954 | 11 | "Wanted" | Perry Como | 4 | 18 June 1954 | 2 |
| 18 June 1954 | 20 | "Cara Mia" | David Whitfield with Mantovani & His Orchestra | 1 | 2 July 1954 | 10 |
| 25 June 1954 | 14 | "Idle Gossip" | Perry Como | 3 | 20 August 1954 | 1 |
| 25 June 1954 | 13 | "Wanted" | Al Martino | 4 | 23 July 1954 | 3 |
| 2 July 1954 | 20 | "Little Things Mean a Lot" | Kitty Kallen | 1 | 10 September 1954 | 1 |
| 2 July 1954 | 6 | "The Little Shoemaker" | Petula Clark | 7 | 23 July 1954 | 2 |
| 16 July 1954 | 15 | "Three Coins in the Fountain" | Frank Sinatra | 1 | 17 September 1954 | 3 |
| 23 July 1954 | 7 | "Rachmaninoff's 18th Variation on a Theme By Paganini (The Story of Three Loves)" | Winifred Atwell | 9 | 27 August 1954 | 2 |
| 30 July 1954 | 5 | "Three Coins in the Fountain" | The Four Aces | 5 | 13 August 1954 | 1 |
| 13 August 1954 | 14 | "My Friend" | Frankie Laine | 3 | 24 September 1954 | 2 |
| 27 August 1954 | 7 | "The Black Hills of Dakota" | Doris Day | 7 | 27 August 1954 | 2 |
| 3 September 1954 | 16 | "Hold My Hand" | Don Cornell | 1 | 8 October 1954 | 5 |
| 10 September 1954 | 12 | "Smile" | Nat King Cole | 2 | 1 October 1954 | 3 |
| 24 September 1954 | 2 | "Gilly Gilly Ossenfeffer Katzenellen Bogen by the Sea" | Max Bygraves | 7 | 24 September 1954 | 2 |
| 1 October 1954 | 3 | "Sway" | Dean Martin | 6 | 15 October 1954 | 1 |
| 1 October 1954 | 3 | "The Story of Tina" | Al Martino | 10 | 1 October 1954 | 3 |
| 8 October 1954 | 8 | "If I Give My Heart to You" | Doris Day with The Mellomen | 4 | 12 November 1954 | 1 |
| 15 October 1954 | 12 | "My Son, My Son" | Vera Lynn | 1 | 5 November 1954 | 2 |
| 15 October 1954 | 13 | "This Ole House" | Rosemary Clooney | 1 | 26 November 1954 | 1 |
| 22 October 1954 | 8 | "This Ole House" | Billie Anthony | 4 | 29 October 1954 | 1 |
| 22 October 1954 | 1 | "There Must Be a Reason" | Frankie Laine | 9 | 22 October 1954 | 1 |
| 29 October 1954 | 10 | "Rain Rain Rain" | Frankie Laine & The Four Lads | 8 | 29 October 1954 | 3 |
| 29 October 1954 | 7 | "If I Give My Heart to You" | Joan Regan | 3 | 26 November 1954 | 1 |
| 19 November 1954 | 14 | "No One But You" ♦ | Billy Eckstine | 3 | 14 January 1955 | 2 |
| 26 November 1954 | 7 | "Let's Have Another Party" | Winifred Atwell | 1 | 3 December 1954 | 5 |
| 26 November 1954 | 7 | "Santo Natale (Merry Christmas)" | David Whitfield | 2 | 3 December 1954 | 5 |
| 3 December 1954 | 9 | "I Still Believe" | Ronnie Hilton | 3 | 17 December 1954 | 3 |
| 17 December 1954 | 3 | "Let's Get Together No. 1" | The Big Ben Banjo Band | 6 | 17 December 1954 | 2 |
| 17 December 1954 | 14 | "The Finger of Suspicion" ♦ | Dickie Valentine with The Stargazers | 1 | 7 January 1955 | 3 |
| 17 December 1954 | 13 | "Heartbeat" ♦ | Ruby Murray | 3 | 28 January 1955 | 1 |

== Entries by artist ==
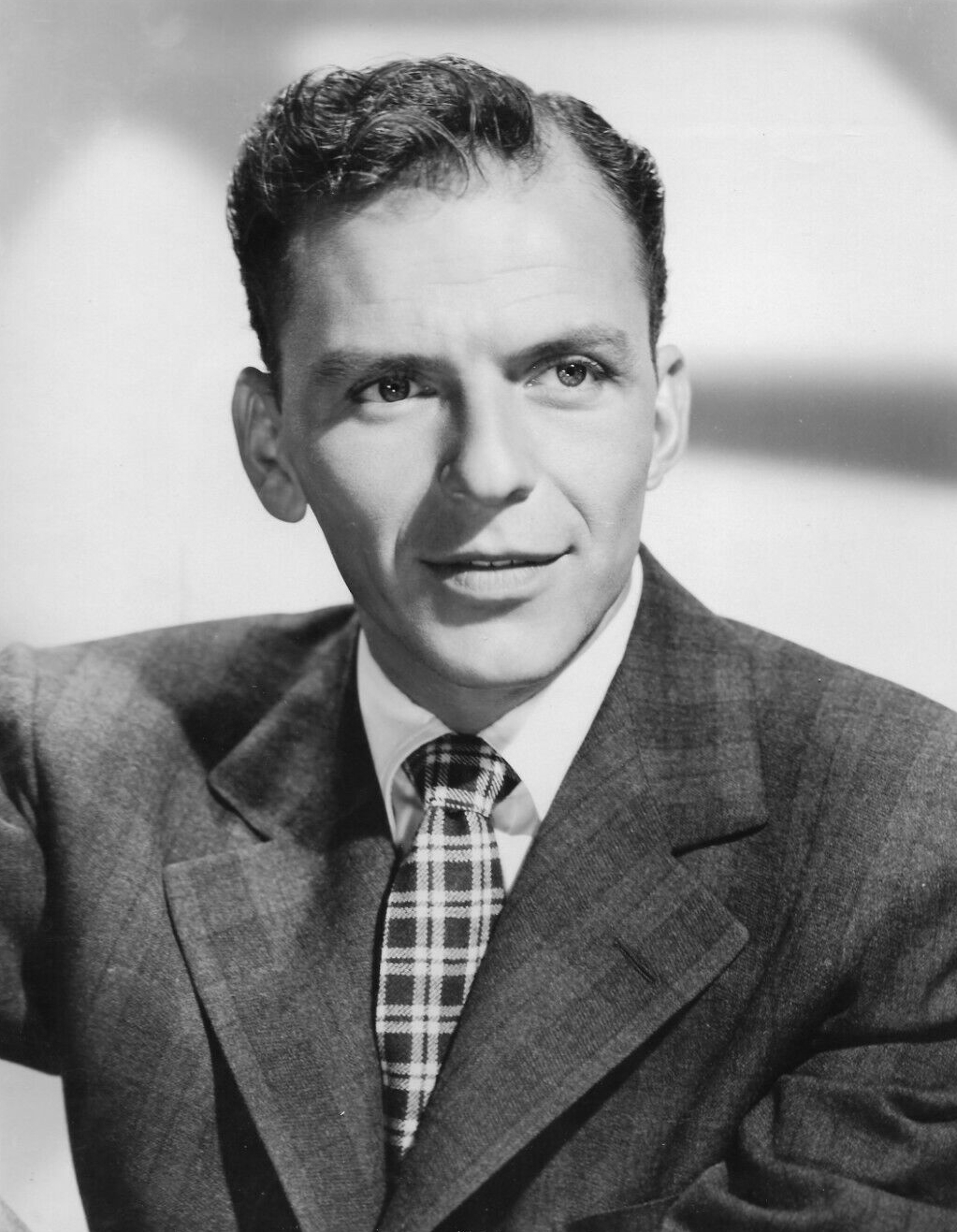
Frank Sinatra secured his first UK top 10 hit this year with his recording of the Academy Award-winning song "Three Coins in the Fountain", which spent three weeks at number-one.

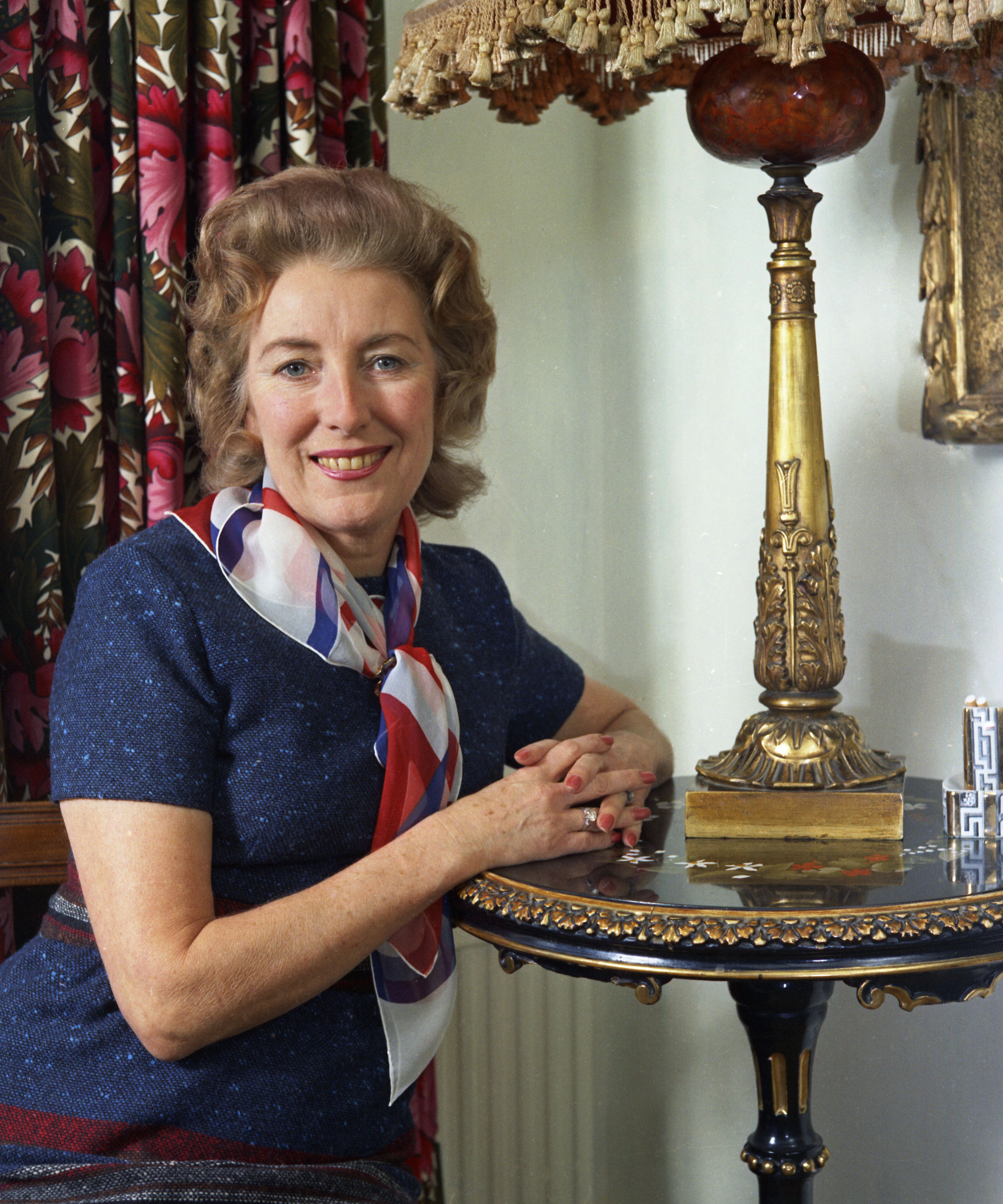
Vera Lynn (pictured in 1973) achieved her only UK number-one single in November 1954 with "My Son, My Son".

The following table shows artists who achieved two or more top 10 entries in 1954, including singles that reached their peak in 1953 or 1955. The figures include both main artists and featured artists. The total number of weeks an artist spent in the top ten in 1954 is also shown.

| Entries | Artist | Weeks | Singles |
|---|---|---|---|
| 7 | Frankie Laine | 55 | "Answer Me", "Blowing Wild (The Ballad of Black Gold)", "Granada", "My Friend", "Rain Rain Rain", "The Kid's Last Fight", "There Must Be a Reason" |
| 5 | David Whitfield | 53 | "Answer Me", "Cara Mia, "Rags to Riches", "Santo Natale (Merry Christmas)", "The Book" |
| 4 | Guy Mitchell | 28 | "A Dime and a Dollar", "Chicka Boom", "Cloud Lucky Seven", "The Cuff of My Shirt" |
| 3 | Doris Day | 42 | "If I Give My Heart to You", "Secret Love", "The Black Hills of Dakota" |
| 3 | Joan Regan | 18 | "If I Give My Heart to You", "Ricochet", "Someone Else's Roses" |
| 3 | Winifred Atwell | 17 | "Let's Have a Party", "Let's Have Another Party", "Rachmaninoff's 18th Variation on a Theme By Paganini" |
| 2 | Al Martino | 19 | "Wanted", "The Story of Tina" |
| 2 | Dean Martin | 14 | "Sway", "That's Amore" |
| 2 | Mantovani ^{[R]} | 28 | "Cara Mia", "Swedish Rhapsody" |
| 2 | Max Bygraves | 12 | "Gilly Gilly Ossenfeffer Katzenellen Bogen by the Sea", "The Gang That Sang Heart of My Heart" |
| 2 | Nat King Cole | 13 | "Smile", "Tenderly" |
| 2 | Perry Como | 28 | "Idle Gossip", "Wanted" |
| 2 | Rosemary Clooney | 15 | "Man (Uh-huh)"/"Woman (Uh-huh)", "This Ole House" |
| 2 | The Stargazers | 29 | "I See the Moon", "The Finger of Suspicion" |

== Notes ==
- ^{a} "No One But You" reached its peak of number three on 20 January 1955 (week ending).
- ^{b} "Heartbeat" reached its peak of number three on 3 February 1955 (week ending).
- ^{c} "Poppa Piccolino" re-entered the top 10 at number 5 on 14 January 1954 (week ending) for 2 weeks.
- ^{d} "Chicka Boom" re-entered the top 10 at number 8 on 21 January 1954 (week ending) for 4 weeks.
- ^{f} "Oh! My Papa" re-entered the top 10 at number 10 on 4 March 1954 (week ending).
- ^{g} "Changing Partners" (Bing Crosby version) re-entered the top 10 at number 9 on 8 April 1954 (week ending).
- ^{h} "Granada" re-entered the top 10 at number 9 on 15 April 1954 (week ending).
- ^{i} "A Dime and a Dollar" re-entered the top 10 at number 9 on 20 May 1954 (week ending) and at number 8 on 3 June 1954 (week ending).

== See also ==
- 1954 in British music
- List of number-one singles from the 1950s (UK)
