= David Whitfield discography =

- Studio albums: 6
- EPs: 11
- Live albums: 2
- Compilation albums: 14
- Singles: 37

This is the discography of British singer David Whitfield.

== Albums ==
=== Studio albums ===
Title	Album details
Yours from the Heart	Released: 1954; Label: Decca; Formats: LP
From David with Love	Released: November 1958; Label: Decca, London; Formats: LP
My Heart and I	Released: 1960; Label: Decca, London; Formats: LP
Alone	Released: 1961; Label: Decca, London; Formats: LP
Great Songs for Young Lovers	Released: September 1966; Label: Decca, London; Formats: LP; Release in the US and Canada as The Return of David Whitfield
Hey There! It's David Whitfield	Released: March 1975; Label: Philips; Formats: LP

=== Live albums ===
Title	Album details
David Whitfield – Live	Released: 20 February 2006; Label: Brevan; Formats: CD
More David Whitfield – Live	Released: 15 January 2007; Label: Brevan; Formats: CD

=== Compilation albums ===
Title	Album details
Cara Mia	Released: 1956; Label: London; Formats: LP
David Whitfield Favourites	Released: July 1958; Label: Decca, London; Formats: LP
The World of David Whitfield	Released: October 1969; Label: Decca, London; Formats: LP
The World of David Whitfield Vol. 2	Released: July 1975; Label: Decca; Formats: LP
Focus on David Whitfield	Released: September 1978; Label: Decca; Formats: 2xLP
David Whitfield's Greatest Hits	Released: February 1983; Label: Decca; Formats: LP, MC
David Whitfield Sings Stage & Screen Favourites	Released: 1989; Label: Pickwick; Formats: CD
David Whitfield's Greatest Hits	Released: 1990; Label: Esclipse; Formats: CD
The Very Best of David Whitfield	Released: October 1997; Label: Spectrum Music; Formats: CD, MC
The Very Best of David Whitfield Volume 2	Released: 24 April 2000; Label: Spectrum Music; Formats: CD
Love, Tears and Kisses	Released: 19 September 2005; Label: Pegasus; Formats: CD
The Best of David Whitfield	Released: 27 February 2006; Label: Xtra; Formats: CD
The Hits and More... – The Ultimate Collection	Released: 15 October 2010; Label: Jasmine; Formats: 2xCD
Cara Mia – The Very Best of David Whitfield	Released: 3 February 2014; Label: Memory Lane Media; Formats: 3xCD

== EPs ==
Title (Note: This is a list of EPs released in the UK. Various other EPs were released elsewhere. Note that the UK EP chart did not begin until 1960.)	Details	Peak chart positions
Title	Details	UK
Cara Mia	Released: February 1955; Label: Decca	—
David Whitfield Sings Tolchard Evans' Songs	Released: October 1955; Label: Decca	—
David Whitfield	Released: October 1956; Label: Decca	—
David Whitfield No. 2	Released: May 1957; Label: Decca	—
David Whitfield No. 3	Released: October 1957; Label: Decca	—
From David with Love	Released: November 1958; Label: Decca	—
The Good Old Songs	Released: 1960; Label: Decca	—
My Heart and I Vol. 1	Released: October 1960; Label: Decca	—
Rose Marie	Released: 1961; Label: Decca	15
Alone	Released: 1961; Label: Decca	—
The Desert Song. David Whitfield with Jan Waters	Released: 1962; Label: Decca; Split with Jan Waters	16
"—" denotes releases that did not chart.

== Singles ==
Title	Year	Peak chart positions		
Title	Year	UK	AUS	US
"I'll Never Forget You" b/w "Marta (Rambling Rose of the Wildwood)"	1953	—	—	—
"I Believe" b/w "I'll Make You Mine"	1953	—	—	—
"The Bridge of Sighs" b/w "I'm the King of Broken Hearts"	1953	9	—	—
"Answer Me" b/w "Dance Gypsy Dance"	1953	1	—	—
"Rags to Riches" b/w "Mardi Gras"	1953	3	—	—
"The Book" b/w "Heartless"	1954	5	—	—
"Laugh" b/w ""It's Never Too Late to Pray"	1954	—	—	—
"Cara Mia" b/w "Love, Tears and Kisses"	1954	1	2	10
"Smile" b/w "How, When or Where"	1954	—	—	—
"Santo Natale (Merry Christmas)" b/w "Adeste Fideles (O Come All Ye Faithful)"	1954	2	—	19
"Beyond the Stars" b/w "Open Your Heart"	1955	8	—	—
"Mama" b/w "Ev'rywhere"	1955	12; 3	—	—
"The Lady" b/w "Santa Rosa Lea Rose"	1955	—	—	—
"I'll Never Stop Loving You" b/w "Lady of Madrid"	1955	—	—	—
"When You Lose the One You Love" b/w "Angelus"	1955	7	—	62
"My September Love" b/w "The Rudder and the Rock"	1956	3	—	—
"My Son John" b/w "My Unfinished Symphony"	1956	22; 29	—	—
"The Adoration Waltz" b/w "If I Lost You"	1957	9	—	—
"I'll Find You" b/w "I'd Give You the World"	1957	27	—	—
"Without Him" b/w "Dream of Paradise"	1957	—	—	—
"Martinella" b/w "Ev'rything"	1957	—	—	—
"Cry My Heart Out" b/w "My One True Love"	1958	22	—	—
"On the Street Where You Live" b/w "Afraid"	1958	16	—	—
"The Right to Love" b/w "That's When Your Heartaches Begin"	1958	30	—	—
"This Is Lucia" b/w "Love Is a Stranger"	1958	—	—	—
"William Tell" b/w "Willingly"	1959	—	—	—
"A Million Stars" b/w "Farewell My Love"	1959	—	—	—
"Oh, Tree" b/w "Our Love Waltz"	1959	—	—	—
"Song of the Dreamer" b/w "My Only Love"	1960	—	—	—
"Angela Mia" b/w "A Tear, a Kiss, a Smile"	1960	—	—	—
"I Believe" b/w "Hear My Song, Violetta"	1960	49	— 64	—
"A Scottish Soldier" (withdrawn from release in the UK) b/w "Scotland the Brave"	1961	—	97	—
"Climb Ev'ry Mountain" b/w "The Sound of Music"	1961	—	—	—
"As Long as You Love Me" b/w "Impossible"	1962	—	—	—
"This Heart of Mine" b/w "You Belong in Someone Else's Arms"	1963	—	—	—
"Land of Hope and Glory" b/w "When You Lose the One You Love"	1977	—	—	—
"Santo Natale"	2004	93	—	—
"—" denotes releases that did not chart or were not released in that territory.
