= Kiddies Corner =

- Thousands of children tuned into Kiddies Corner.
- Genre: children's programme
- Running time: 30 minutes
- Country of origin: Sri Lanka
- Language: English
- Home station: Radio Ceylon, Sri Lanka Broadcasting Corporation
- Executive producer: Vernon Corea
- Narrated by: The Presenters have been: Craig Thompson, Vernon Corea, Greg Roskowski, Vijaya Corea
- Recording studio: Radio Ceylon
- Original release: June 6, 1963 – 1970s

Kiddies Corner was a hugely popular children's radio programme broadcast on the Commercial Service of Radio Ceylon. The format was devised in 1963. This was the 'golden era' of the radio station, the oldest in South Asia. Millions tuned into Radio Ceylon and it was known as the 'King of the Airwaves' in South Asia in the 1950s and 1960s.

== The format of Kiddies Corner ==
Masterminding the children's radio programme was the broadcaster Vernon Corea. The station co-opted a young American Peace Corps worker, Craig Thompson, to front the programme. The programme built up a huge following on the island and thousands of children tuned in to listen to 'Uncle Craig,' over the airwaves of Radio Ceylon—the programme had a mix of stories, plays, maths tables, children's songs sung by a range of artistes such as Burl Ives, Danny Kaye and Max Bygraves together with children's folk songs in Sinhala and Tamil. A huge favourite with Ceylonese and indeed children in South Asia was the song "Gilly Gilly Ossenfeffer Katzenellen Bogen by the Sea", sung by Max Bygraves - the song entered the UK Singles Chart on September 10, 1954, and reached No 7. It was a real hit in the Indian sub-continent as Radio Ceylon played it on their All Asia Service as well as the Commercial Service in the 1950s and the 1960s.

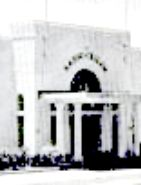
Kiddies Corner was the number one children's radio programme in English over the Commercial Service of Radio Ceylon.

== Young Ceylonese talent ==
The programme was a showcase for young Ceylonese talent and school orchestras were featured on 'Kiddies Corner.' Children were invited into the studio to participate in some of the radio plays on 'Kiddies Corner.'

== Craig Thompson ==
Craig Thompson was the first presenter of 'Kiddies Corner'. Recalling the first ever recording of the children's programme Thompson noted: 'On the program, I was known as "Uncle Craig" or "Craig Maåma"...where I would join in and read stories, sing songs like "Gilly, Gilly Ossenfeffer, Katzen-Ellen-Bogen-By-the-Sea" "Tickery, Tickery Leea" and other fun activities. We even spent several weeks putting together a playlet called "The Necklace of Truth" ...and had children participate in the various parts on the program. We recorded my first episode on Thursday, June 6, 1963, and our second episode on Friday, June 14, 1963. On Saturday, September 7, 1963, we began recording the children's program at 12:30 p.m. for a new broadcast time of 4:15 p.m (instead of the usual 3:30). Parents had been writing saying that they would like us to come on the air at a later time so that "the whole family can listen." As 3:30 seemed to be nap time for many children, they wanted us to change the time for everyone to listen.'

Some of the other presenters of 'Kiddies Corner' were Vernon Corea, Greg Roskowski and Vijaya Corea. Kiddies Corner enjoyed enormous popularity for over a decade on Radio Ceylon.

== See also ==
- Radio Ceylon
- Sri Lanka Broadcasting Corporation
- List of Sri Lankan Broadcasters
- Gilly Gilly Ossenfeffer Katzenellen Bogen by the Sea

== Bibliography ==
- Wavell, Stuart. - The Art of Radio - Training Manual written by the Director Training of the CBC. - Ceylon Broadcasting Corporation, 1969.
