= Tell Me a Story (Terry Gilkyson song) =

Single by Jimmy Boyd and Frankie Laine
- B-side: "The Little Boy and the Old Man"
- Released: February 13, 1953
- Genre: Novelty
- Length: 2:13
- Label: Columbia
- Songwriter(s): Terry Gilkyson

Jimmy Boyd singles chronology
"Early Bird" (1953)	"Tell Me a Story" (1953)	"Two Easter Sunday Sweethearts" (1953)

Frankie Laine singles chronology
"I Believe" (1953)	"Tell Me a Story" (1953)	"I Let Her Go" (1953)

"Tell Me a Story" is a song written by Terry Gilkyson and performed by Jimmy Boyd and Frankie Laine, with the Norman Luboff Chorus. It reached #1 in Australia, #4 on the U.S. pop chart, and #5 on the UK Singles Chart in 1953.

The song is a mini-opera of a duet between the "Junior", of kindergarten age, who demands his hard working father to read him a story. The father, who has gotten no raise at work, is wanting to seek relief from the world, when all of a sudden, the "Junior" yells out to him to repeatedly tell him a story. When the father starts to tell the story, the "Junior" repeatedly interrupts him, telling him not to go back into history, driving the father crazy, who tells "Junior" to refrain his demanding. The "Junior" asks his father to tell him a story about a fish who was "Bigger than a Whale". This drives the angry father to swat him 3 times on the buttocks, causing the "Junior" to yell "OW" and making him go to bed. Even after the song ends, the Junior still asks his father for a story, while giggling.

The song ranked #23 on Billboard's Year-End top 30 singles of 1953.

== Other versions ==
- The Big Ben Banjo Band featuring the Mike Sammes Singers released a version of the song as a medley with the songs "Have a Go, Joe" and "Music From the Movies (March)" on their 1965 album Sing Along with Big Ben.
