= The Washington Mayfair Hotel =

Hotel in London

Coordinates: 51.51434°N 0.13948°W

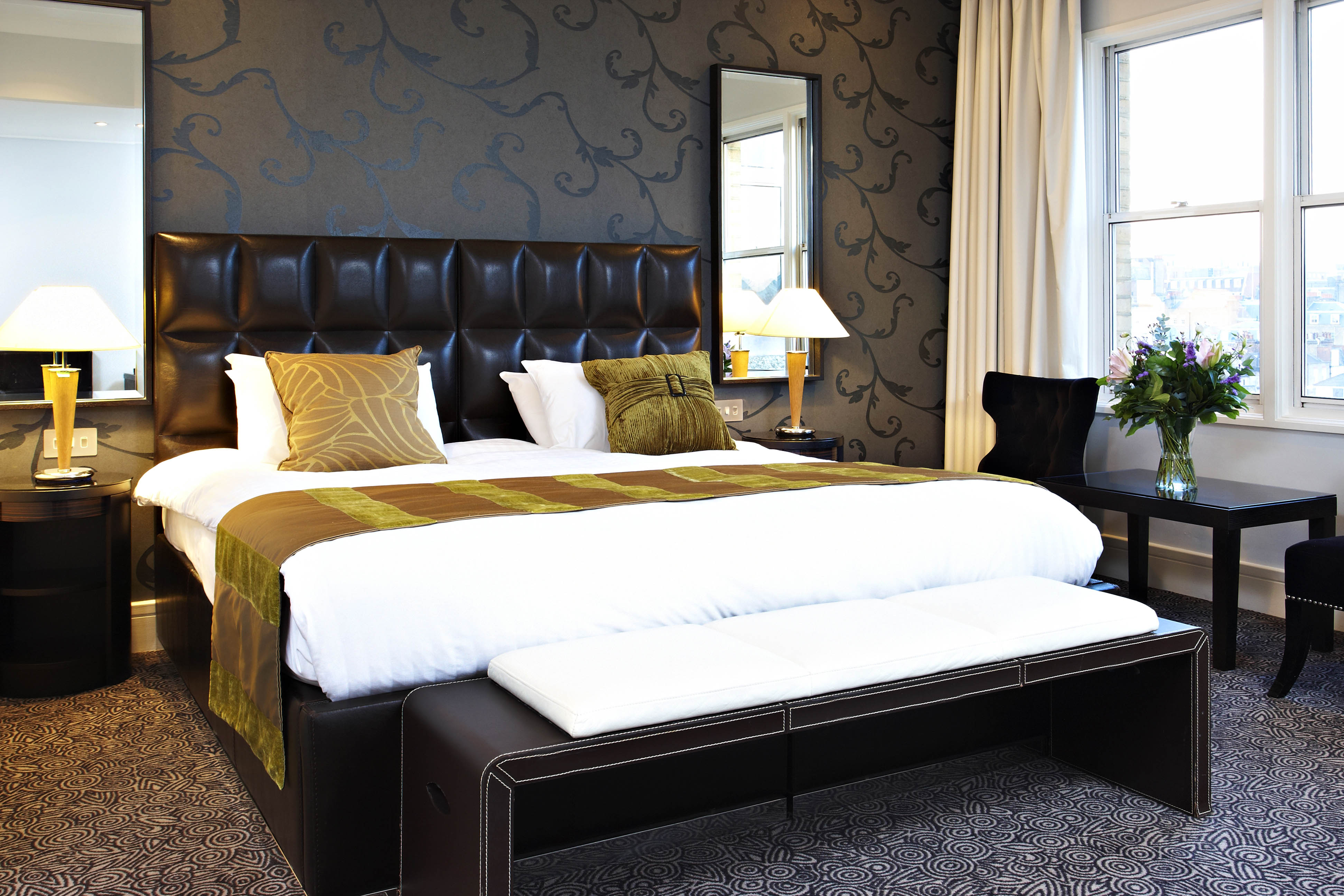

- Location within Central London

General information
- Location: 5 Curzon Street, Mayfair, London, England, United Kingdom

Other information
- Number of rooms: 178 rooms and suites (18 suites & a two-bedroom Penthouse Suite)
- Number of suites: 19
- Number of restaurants: 1

Website
- http://www.washington-mayfair.co.uk/

The Washington Mayfair is a four star hotel in London's Mayfair district.

== History ==
The Washington Mayfair Hotel's origins go back to the 19th century when individual houses on the site were used as boarding houses for visitors requiring a Mayfair address. They were so popular that eventually enough houses were incorporated to allow their demolition and the reconstruction of wounded soldiers returning from the front.

Returning to its original use as hotel at the end of the war, The Washington Mayfair Hotel became the favoured home of various individuals such as the Italian painter, Pietro Annigoni, American socialite Laura Mae Corrigan, and American actress Tallulah Bankhead. It also had a reputation as a musical venue and in 1953 the singer David Whitfield was discovered and went on to stardom after sometime as resident singer.

Legendary Indian matinee idol Dev Anand died at the hotel on December 3 night in 2011.
