= Candy Lips =

Single by Doris Day
- A-side: "Let's Walk That-a-Way"
- Released: May 22, 1953
- Genre: Vocal
- Length: 2:06
- Label: Columbia; 40001
- Songwriter(s): Fred Rose

Doris Day singles chronology
| "When the Red, Red Robin (Comes Bob, Bob, Bobbin' Along)" (March 27, 1953) | "Candy Lips" (1953) | "Kiss Me Again, Stranger" (June 15, 1953) |

"Candy Lips" is a song written by Fred Rose and performed by Doris Day featuring Johnnie Ray with Paul Weston and His Orchestra. In 1953, the track reached No. 17 on the US chart.

== Other Versions ==
- Elmo Tanner and His Dixielanders released a version of the song as the B-side to his 1951 single "Whistlin' Paper Boy".
