= Those Redheads from Seattle =

1953 film by Lewis R. Foster

- Theatrical release poster
- Directed by: Lewis R. Foster
- Written by: Lewis R. Foster; Daniel Mainwaring; George Worthing Yates
- Produced by: William H. Pine; William C. Thomas
- Starring: Rhonda Fleming; Gene Barry; Agnes Moorehead
- Cinematography: Lionel Lindon
- Edited by: Archie Marshek
- Music by: Sidney Cutner; Leo Shuken
- Color process: Technicolor
- Production company: Pine-Thomas Productions
- Distributed by: Paramount Pictures
- Release date: October 16, 1953 (USA)
- Running time: 90 minutes
- Country: United States
- Language: English

Those Redheads from Seattle is a 1953 American musical Western film produced in 3-D directed by Lewis R. Foster and starring Rhonda Fleming, Gene Barry and Agnes Moorehead, and released by Paramount Pictures. It was the first 3-D musical.

== Plot ==
A woman (Moorehead) takes her four unmarried daughters to Alaska during the 1898 Gold Rush to help their father, not knowing he is already dead. When the Edmonds women arrive in Skagway, they meet Johnny Kisco, owner of the Klondike Club, whose partner is the one who killed Edmonds, a newspaper publisher.

When the women find out Edmonds is dead and had no money, one becomes a dancer and singer, one becomes a nurse and the other two run the newspaper that once belonged to their father, trying to run out the owner of the burlesque club. Pat, the singer, falls for Johnny and performs at his club. He is more interested in her sister Kathie, who takes exception to Johnny's ways and decides to wed a more respectable minister.

Johnny departs for Fairbanks to track down his partner, saving him from an avalanche and bringing him back to confess to Edmonds' murder. On the day she's to be married, Kathie, still in her wedding dress, runs to Johnny, realizing she is in love with him.

== Cast ==
- Rhonda Fleming as Katherine Edmonds
- Gene Barry as Johnny Kisco
- Agnes Moorehead as Mrs. Edmonds
- Teresa Brewer as Patricia Edmonds
- Guy Mitchell as Joe Keenan
- The Bell Sisters as Connie and Nell Edmonds
- Jean Parker as Liz
- Roscoe Ates as Dan Taylor
- John Kellogg as Mike Yurkil
- Frank Wilcox as Vance Edmonds
- Walter Reed as Whitey Marks
- William Pullen as Rev. Louis Petrie

== Production ==
The film was originally called The Sisters from Seattle and was to have starred Rhonda Fleming, John Payne and Arlene Dahl. It was going to be the first musical from Pine-Thomas Productions.

In January 1953 it was announced the film would be shot in 3-D.

Dahl dropped out as well and was replaced by Mindy Carson. She fell through and was replaced by singer Teresa Brewer. It was Brewer's first film but Pine and Thomas saw a screen test she made for 20th Century Fox the previous year, and were impressed by a poll of theatre owners which listed her among the top five singers in the country. She had to dye her brown hair red to match Fleming's hair.

In February 1953 Payne was ruled out of the film and was replaced by Gene Barry, who had just starred in War of the Worlds. He was joined by singer Guy Mitchell and performing group The Bell Sisters.

Jean Parker who had made a number of films for Pine-Thomas in the 1940s returned to the screen for the first time in three years to play a role.

Filming started March 1953. In April the title was changed to Those Redheads from Seattle.

== Release ==
The film was released in 3-D and non-3-D versions- Paramount gave exhibitors the right to choose.

Although Kiss Me Kate, released by Metro-Goldwyn-Mayer in November 1953, is often referred to as the first 3-D musical, Those Redheads from Seattle was released a month earlier.

== Music ==
In the film, Teresa Brewer sings the Jerry Livingston/Mack David song "Baby, Baby, Baby", which was released as a single, and later covered by Mindy Carson, Jimmy Witherspoon and other artists.

Mitchell had a hit with "Chicka Boom" written by Bob Merrill that Mitchell sang in the film.

Other songs featured include:

"I Guess It Was You All the Time" written by Johnny Mercer and Hoagy Carmichael

"Mr. Banjo Man"

"Take Back Your Gold"

== Restoration ==
In September 2006, the film was shown in 3-D for the first time in 50 years at the World 3-D Expo in Hollywood.

In 2017 a digital restoration played at the TCM Festival in Hollywood and at the Seattle International Film Festival. The movie premiered in Seattle at the Paramount Theatre in 1953.

A 3-D Blu-ray was released in May 2017 by Kino Lorber.
