= Cowpuncher's Cantata =

"Cowpuncher's Cantata" is a song that was released by Max Bygraves in 1952. It peaked at number 6 on the UK Singles Chart and spent a total of eight weeks in the top 12.

== Background ==
At the time of release, Bygraves was a cutting-edge comedian, having become a national celebrity through his collaboration with Eric Sykes for the radio script Educating Archie in which Bygraves played the tutor to Peter Brough's ventriloquist dummy Archie Andrews. An album, The Cowpuncher's Cantata, was released to take advantage of upon this new-found fame.

The title track of that album, "Cowpuncher's Cantata", is a medley of Bygraves' humorous interpretations of popular records of the time, including Frankie Laine's "Mule Train" and "Cry of the Wild Goose", "(Ghost) Riders in the Sky" and "Jezebel".

== Production ==
The song was recorded at Abbey Road Studios, and was overseen by George Martin, who by that point had acquired a reputation for producing quirky records. The song was backed by "True Loves and False Lovers", and was released on His Master's Voice.

Talking to Brian Southall, Peter Vincent and Alan Rouse for the book Abbey Road: The Story of the World's Most Famous Recording Studios, Wally Ridley recounted that he had some trouble getting Bygraves to sing the lyrics at the right time:

"Max Bygraves' first record was a thing called 'Cowpuncher's Cantata' which was an odd shaped piece of music and we had great difficulty in getting Maxie to come in on the beat because there were long gaps in between the vocal lines. He had trouble finding when to enter and in the end I had to stand next to him and squeeze his arm when he had to come in. It all worked out fine in the end and we had a big success."

— Wally Ridley

== Chart positions ==
The song appeared on the first UK Singles Chart "Top 12" (actually 15; six records had sold the same number of copies as another record), charting at #11. It was the only song on that UK Top 12 to be sung by a British male vocalist. The following year, it re-entered the chart three times; on 3 January 1953 at #8, on 24 January 1953 at #6 (at which it peaked) where it spent five consecutive weeks in the Top 12, and once on 7 March 1953 at #10.

== In popular culture ==
The song appeared on an episode of Desert Island Discs featuring the selections of Eric Sykes.
