= Let's Walk That-a-Way =

Single by Doris Day
- B-side: "Candy Lips"
- Released: May 22, 1953
- Genre: Vocal
- Length: 2:39
- Label: Columbia; 40001
- Songwriter(s): Kay Twomey, Fred Wise, Ben Weisman

Doris Day singles chronology
"When the Red, Red Robin (Comes Bob, Bob, Bobbin' Along)" (March 27, 1953)	"Let's Walk That-a-Way" (1953)	"Kiss Me Again, Stranger" (June 15, 1953)

"Let's Walk That-a-Way" is a song written by Kay Twomey, Fred Wise, and Ben Weisman and performed by Doris Day featuring Johnnie Ray. In 1953, the track reached No. 4 on the UK Singles Chart.
