= Faith Can Move Mountains =

Single by Johnnie Ray and the Four Lads
- B-side: "Love Me (Baby Can't You Love Me)"
- Released: 1952
- Recorded: 1952
- Length: 2:43
- Label: Columbia
- Composer: Guy Wood
- Lyricist: Ben Raleigh

"Faith Can Move Mountains" is a song that was recorded by Johnnie Ray and the Four Lads in 1952. It was written by Guy Wood with words by Ben Raleigh.

== Chart performance ==
The single, backed with "Love Me (Baby Can't You Love Me)| reached number 20 on the US Cashbox chart. In the UK, it peaked at number seven on the UK Singles Chart.
