= Walkin' to Missouri =

Song
- Written: 1952
- Songwriter: Bob Merrill

"Walkin' to Missouri" is a popular song written by Bob Merrill in 1952. Sammy Kaye's version peaked at No. 11 (U.S.) in 1952. In the United Kingdom, Tony Brent's cover version reached No. 7 in the UK Singles Chart in January 1953.

== Background ==
The song is a prodigal son allegory about a young man (the story's metaphorical "robin") who could not fly and could only walk all the way back to his old home in Missouri, following a life of partying in the big city jazz scene - or the repercussions that happened as a result. During the course of the song, it transpired that he had "met a birdie who looked so nice", who, until the end, was secretly having an affair with someone else. While the song does not make any details of the revelation, it can be gleaned from the last verse that the protagonist was forced out of his comfort zone and likely lost money: "His dreams are battered, his feathers bent/And he hasn't got a cent/He feels like his heart is gonna break". The song, at the end, urges the listeners to show this "robin" some kindness if he ever approaches them, because the mistake is an easy one to make.

The initial release of Kaye's recording coincided with the 1952 United States presidential election campaigns. Disc jockeys around the U.S. used the allegory of the lyrics "walkin' to Missouri...got a teardrop in his eye" as a jab to Harry S. Truman, who returned to his home in Independence, Missouri, following his tenure as President of the United States. This contributed to airplay and the subsequent popularity of the song.

== Other recorded versions ==
- Lita Roza in (1953),
- Sue Thompson in (1957),
- Russ Morgan in (1958).
