= Broken Wings (1953 song) =

1953 song

Single by The Stargazers Accompaniment directed by Nat Temple
- B-side: "Make It Soon"
- Published: 26 February 1952
- Released: February 1953
- Recorded: 6 January 1953
- Genre: Popular music
- Length: 2:56
- Label: Decca Records
- Songwriter(s): John Jerome; Bernhard Grun
- Producer(s): Dick Rowe

"Broken Wings" is a 1953 popular song that was written by John Jerome and Bernhard Grun.

The most successful version of the song was produced by Dick Rowe and recorded in the UK by vocal group The Stargazers in 1953. It was the first record by any UK act to reach number one in the UK Singles Chart (all previous number one singles were by American artists), and was the first of two number-one UK hits for the group, the other being "I See the Moon", a year later.

== Background ==
Most contemporary hit songs came from America in the early 1950s; however, "Broken Wings" originated in the UK, having been first published by the John Fields Music Company in London on 26 February 1952. As such, it was the first British song to be a UK number one hit. John Jerome was a collaborative pseudonym for Harold Cornelius Fields, Howard Ellington Barnes and Joseph Dominic Roncoroni. Bernhard Grun was a German emigrant who used the first name Bernard in England, and had previously composed film music.

== Recordings and chart performance ==
The Stargazers recorded their version in London on 6 January 1953, produced by Dick Rowe, with uncredited accompaniment directed by Nat Temple. Coming just a few months after the launch of the singles chart, it was the first hit for the group, entering the New Musical Express listings on 7 February 1953. It dropped out of the chart on 14 February, before returning the week after for a run which would see the single reach number one on 10 April for a single week (its eighth week on chart). The Stargazers were consequently the first group to reach number one in the UK singles chart.

Two other recordings of the song also entered the UK chart in February 1953: the original American recording by Art and Dotty Todd (peaking at number 6), and the other by Dickie Valentine (reaching number 12). No versions of the song charted in America.

Valentine's version was, in fact, the first to be released in the UK by some months, in July 1952. The majority of the song's recordings were issued in early 1953, starting with Art and Dotty Todd in January that year. On 10 January, "Broken Wings" entered the UK's sheet music chart for a week, before dropping out. It then returned a fortnight later, and remained on the chart to reach number one on 14 February, where it stayed for six weeks. The same month, The Stargazers' recording was released, but "Broken Wings" had already vacated the top spot on the sheet music charts by the time the group made number one on the record chart with the song. Other recorded versions available in the UK were by British artists: Gerry Brereton, David Carey, Victor Silvester and his Ballroom Orchestra, The Sam Browne Singers, and Beryl Templeman. The song was on the sheet music charts for 20 weeks in total.

== See also ==
- List of UK Singles Chart number ones of the 1950s
