= Chicka Boom =

Single by Guy Mitchell
- B-side: "Cloud Lucky Seven"
- Released: 1953
- Genre: Pop rock
- Length: 2:38
- Songwriter: Bob Merrill
- Producer: Mitch Miller

Guy Mitchell singles chronology
"Look at That Girl" (1953)	"Chicka Boom" (1953)	"Cloud Lucky Seven" (1953)

"Chicka Boom" is a popular song written by Bob Merrill. The song was published in 1953 and appeared in the 1953 film, Those Redheads From Seattle.

This was one of a number of Merrill's songs recorded by Guy Mitchell which were hits for him in 1953. The song went to number 16 on the Cashbox charts in August 1953, staying there for 13 weeks. The song went to number 4 on the UK Singles Chart in November 1953, staying there for 15 weeks.

== Other songs ==
Not to be confused with either of two songs of a similar name called "Chick-A-Boom", or with the instrumental tune "Boom-Chicka-Boom" (sometimes written as "Boom Chicka Boom"). "Chick-A-Boom" (Berns, Morrison) was by the Irish singer Van Morrison in the mid-1960s, and as featured on the Midnight Special collection (and Bang Masters) of early and/or unreleased Van Morrison recordings. Morrison's "Chick-A-Boom" was a songwriting collaboration with Bert Berns. The other, "Chick-A-Boom (Don't Ya Jes' Love It)", was by Richard Monda a.k.a. Daddy Dewdrop in 1971. One of the songs from the play/movie, Godspell, "We Beseech Thee," included a chorus that includes the phrase, "Boom chicka boom chicka boom chick chick, chicka booma chicka booma chicka boom chick chick." Lastly, Sandy Nelson's instrumental "Boom-Chicka-Boom" appears on the album "Sandy Nelson Plays Teen Beat" (Imperial, LP 9105), released in 1960.
