= Britannia Rag =

1952 instrumental by Winifred Atwell

"Britannia Rag" is an instrumental that was written and recorded by Winifred Atwell in 1952. It was written for the 1952 Royal Variety Performance. The song peaked at number 5 on the UK Singles Chart, and spent a total of six weeks in the top 12.
