= In a Golden Coach =

Song for Elizabeth II's coronation

"In a Golden Coach (There's a Heart of Gold)"

Song
- Label: Box and Cox Publications
- Songwriters: Jack Henry and Harry Leon

In a Golden Coach is a 1953 song by Jack Henry, often credited under the pseudonym Ronald Jamieson and sometimes alongside Harry Leon, written for the coronation of Queen Elizabeth II.

== Background ==
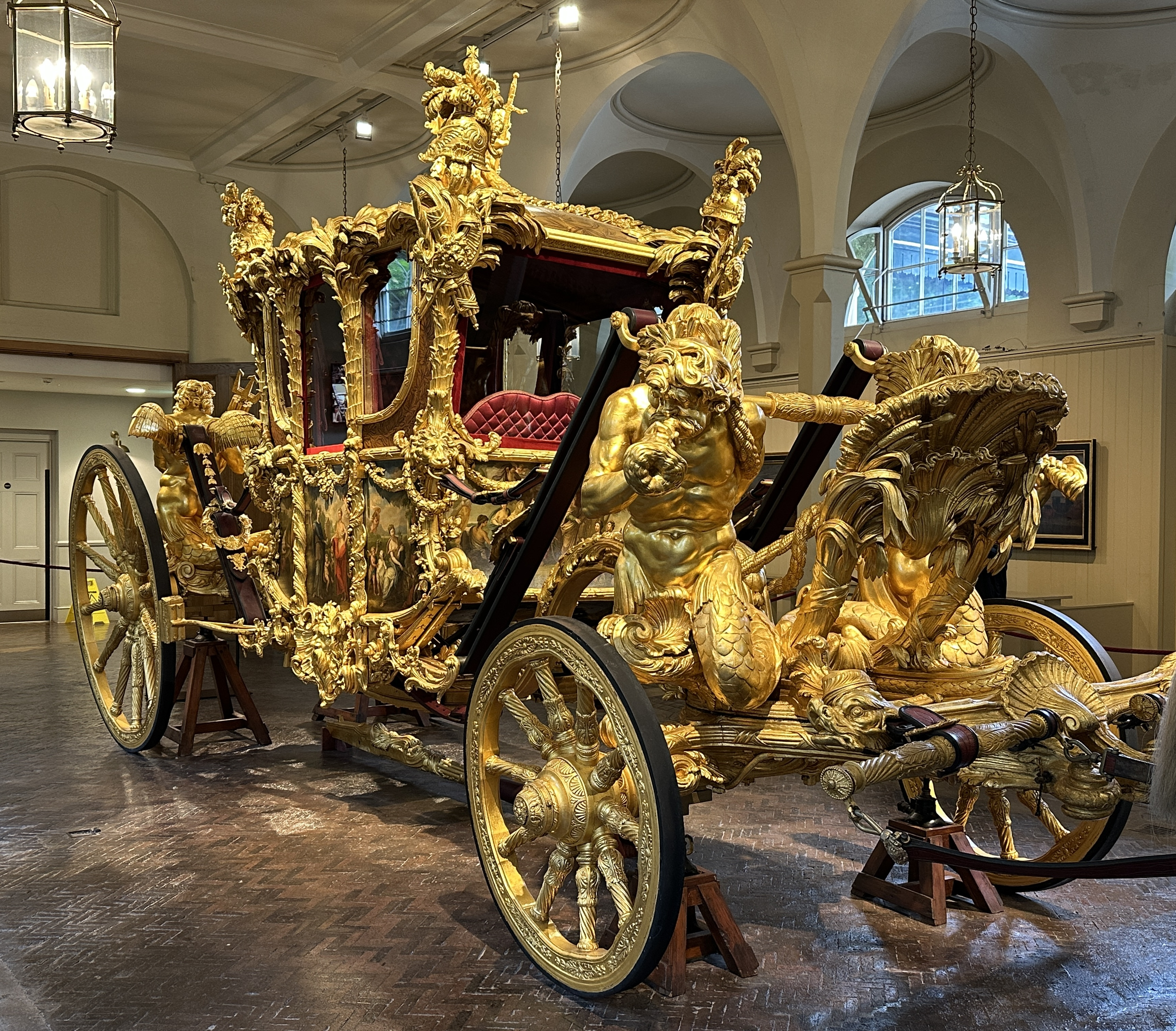
The song references the Gold State Coach

The song was written for the coronation of Queen Elizabeth II and describes her procession through London on the day of her coronation. It makes reference to the Gold State Coach which transported the Queen during the coronation procession.

It was a popular song for the occasion. Reportedly it was sung in pubs and in a rendition by a choir alongside Parnell Road in Poplar to the Queen and Duke of Edinburgh during their first public drive after the procession. Versions of the song by Dickie Valentine and Billy Cotton and his Band peaked at 7 and 3 on the UK's singles chart respectively.
