= The Big Ben Banjo Band =

British musical group

The Big Ben Banjo Band was a musical group that had a hit single in 1954 with "Let's Get Together No. 1". The single peaked at number 6 in the UK Singles Chart. The band was established by Norrie Paramor in the early 1950s.
