= Gilly Gilly Ossenfeffer Katzenellen Bogen by the Sea =

1954 English-language song

"Gilly Gilly Ossenfeffer Katzenellen Bogen by the Sea" is a popular song written by Al Hoffman and Dick Manning and published in 1954. It was a hit in 1954 in both the United States and United Kingdom, albeit for different artists.

== The Four Lads ==
The best-known version in the United States was recorded by the Four Lads with teenage girl Lillian Pasciolla and others on February 27, 1954. The recording by the Four Lads was released in the US by Columbia Records as catalog number 40236. Released in May that year, it first reached the Billboard Best Seller chart on July 3, 1954, peaking at number 18.

== Max Bygraves version ==
The best-known version in the United Kingdom is by Max Bygraves, with his performance recorded on 23 June 1954, with a children's chorus and orchestra directed by Frank Cordell, and released in the UK by His Master's Voice in September 1954 as catalog number B 10734. It entered the UK Singles Chart on 10 September 1954. It spent eight weeks on the chart, peaking at number 7. The "children" were from the Italia Conti Academy of Theatre Arts.

== Media ==
The song has been featured in the game known as "One Song to the Tune of Another" in the long-running BBC Radio 4 radio comedy panel game, I'm Sorry I Haven't a Clue, such as in Series Nine, Episode 1, where it was performed by Willie Rushton.

Heino Gaze wrote the German lyrics, although the German song title was rendered as "Gilli-Gilli, Oxenpfeffer, Katzenellenbogen". Bibi Johns und Die Starlets, with Franz Thon und das Tanzorchester des NWDR, Hamburg, recorded it in Hamburg on September 5, 1954. The song was released by Electrola (German label owned by EMI).

== See also ==
- Katzenellenbogen
