= Answer Me =

1953 popular music song

"Mütterlein"

Song
- Language: German
- English title: "Answer Me"
- Published: 19 April 1952
- Songwriters: Gerhard Winkler, Fred Rauch

"Answer Me" is a popular song, originally titled "Mütterlein", with German lyrics by Gerhard Winkler and Fred Rauch. "Mütterlein" was published on 19 April 1952. English lyrics were written by Carl Sigman, and the song was published as "Answer Me" in New York on 13 October 1953. Contemporary recordings of the English lyric by Frankie Laine and David Whitfield both topped the UK Singles Chart in 1953.

== "Mütterlein" ==
Mütterlein, an old-fashioned term of endearment for a mother in German, was the title used by Gerhard Winkler for a song marking his mother's 75th birthday in 1952. The first artist to record it was Leila Negra, and there were also versions in Danish, Swedish, Finnish and Norwegian. Fred Rauch later wrote new German lyrics, and titled it "Glaube Mir (Believe Me)". This version sold half a million copies for Wolfgang Sauer, a singer and pianist. It was recorded in Dutch by Bob Scholte: "Moeder mijn, moeder mijn" ("mother mine").

== "Answer Me" ==
"Answer Me, Lord Above (Mutterlein)"

Single by Frankie Laine with Paul Weston and his Orchestra and The Norman Luboff Choir Carl Fischer, Piano
- Published: 13 October 1953
- Released: 14 September 1953
- Recorded: 22 June 1953
- Studio: Radio Recorders
- Genre: Religious, traditional pop, ballad
- Length: 2:38
- Label: Columbia
- Songwriters: Carl Sigman, Gerhard Winkler
- Producer: Mitch Miller

Sigman originally wrote his English lyrics as a religious-themed song, "Answer Me", in which the first line reads 'Answer me, Lord above', as a question posed to God about why the singer has lost his lover. This lyric was recorded by Frankie Laine in Hollywood on 22 June 1953. Laine's version did not chart when released in his native America, where it was titled "Answer Me, Lord Above".

British light operatic tenor David Whitfield recorded the song on 23 September the same year. Despite competition from other recordings of "Answer Me", only the two versions by Whitfield and Laine appeared on the UK Singles Chart. Both were released in the UK in October 1953.

Whitfield's recording of "Answer Me" first entered the UK chart on 10 October, whilst Laine's (released in the UK simply as "Answer Me") appeared two weeks later. The song was banned by the BBC after complaints, owing to the religious nature of the lyrics. Bunny Lewis, Whitfield's manager and producer, asked songwriter Carl Sigman to amend his lyric. Rather than asking the question to God about why the singer had lost his love, the lyric was instead addressed directly to the lost lover. In the new lyric, "Answer me, Lord above..." was changed to "Answer me, oh my love...", with other appropriate changes. This revised version was recorded by Whitfield on 27 October. On 6 November, his version of "Answer Me" reached No. 1 in the UK in its fourth week on chart.

On 13 November 1953, for the first time in UK Singles Chart history, one version of a song was knocked off the top spot by another version of the same song, when Frankie Laine's "Answer Me" made No. 1 in its third week on chart, deposing Whitfield's version after a week. Four weeks later, on 11 December, whilst Laine was still at No. 1, Whitfield returned to No. 1 with "Answer Me" for a second and final week, with both records sharing the No. 1 position; this was the only time in British chart history that two versions of the same song were jointly listed at No. 1. In total, Laine's "Answer Me" spent eight weeks at the top of the UK charts.

"Answer Me"

Single by David Whitfield with Stanley Black and his Orchestra
- B-side: "Dance, Gypsy, Dance"
- Published: 13 October 1953
- Released: October 1953
- Recorded: 23 September 1953
- Genre: Religious music, traditional pop, ballad
- Length: 2:33
- Label: Decca
- Songwriters: Carl Sigman, Gerhard Winkler
- Producer: Bunny Lewis

== Other contemporary recordings ==
In October 1953, alongside the hit versions by David Whitfield and Frankie Laine, two versions of "Answer Me" by female singers were released in the UK, by Anne Shelton with the George Mitchell Choir and Jean Campbell. Other recordings available in the UK during the song's period of chart success were by Monty Norman, Harry Farmer (organ), Reggie Goff, Victor Silvester and his Ballroom Orchestra, and Nat 'King' Cole. On the UK's sheet music charts, "Answer Me" first charted on 17 October 1953. On 7 November, its fourth week on chart, it reached No. 1, where it would spend ten weeks (including one week jointly with "I Saw Mommy Kissing Santa Claus").

Frankie Laine re-recorded "Answer Me" with the revised secular lyric in Hollywood on 29 December 1953. This version, titled "Answer Me, My Love", was not released until it appeared on the 1955 LP Lovers' Laine. He would record the song again twice more at future sessions. On 9 December 1964, with orchestra arranged and conducted by Ralph Carmichael, Laine recorded "Answer Me, O Lord" in Hollywood. This version was issued on his album I Believe, which consisted of religious material. In January 1982, "Answer Me, O Lord" was recorded by Laine with the Don Jackson Orchestra and released by Ronco the same year on an album of his re-recorded hits entitled The World Of Frankie Laine. In 1995, Church of Satan founder Anton Szandor LaVey recorded a version of the song that appeared on the album Satan Takes A Holiday.

The original Nat King Cole recording, titled "Answer Me, My Love", was released by Capitol Records in December 1953 (catalog number 2687). This recording first reached the Billboard Best Seller chart on 24 February 1954, and lasted for 19 weeks on the chart, peaking at No. 6. It was the only version of the song to chart in America.

== Recorded versions ==
- Anton LaVey
- The Bachelors (1969) – featured on the LP The World of The Bachelors Vol 3
- Gene Ammons
- Betty Buckley
- Petula Clark (1965) – from the album The Other Man's Grass Is Always Greener (1968)
- Nat King Cole (1953)
- Harry Connick, Jr. (2009)
- Bing Crosby
- Barbara Dickson (1976) – became her first UK top 10 hit, peaking at No. 9
- Bryan Ferry
- Renée Fleming
- The Happenings
- The Harptones (1960)
- Bobby Hatfield
- Engelbert Humperdinck
- Frankie Laine (1953)
- Jackie Lynton (1967) - Columbia DB 8224
- Gisele MacKenzie
- Joni Mitchell (2000) – from the album Both Sides Now
- Roy Orbison
- Ray Peterson (1960)
- Gene Pitney
- Franck Pourcel (1983) – featured on the LP In a Nostalgia Mood
- P. J. Proby (1965)
- Johnny Rivers
- Don Shirley
- Ray Stevens (1968)
- Tierney Sutton (2012)
- Jerry Vale (1972)
- David Whitfield (1953) – two versions, with different lyrics
- Mark Wynter (1964)
- Will Young (2016)

German versions

- Leila Negra
- Rudi Schuricke
- Wolfgang Sauer (1954) as "Glaube mir"

== Other performances ==
- The song was performed in concert by Bob Dylan in 1991 with Richard Thompson at the Guitar Legends concert in Seville.
- The song is in the Keith Jarrett live repertoire; he has performed it at least 15 times with his trio and solo from 2010 onwards.
- Farley (2026)

== See also ==
- List of number-one singles from the 1950s (UK)
