= Jimmy Boyd =

American singer-songwriter (1939–2009)

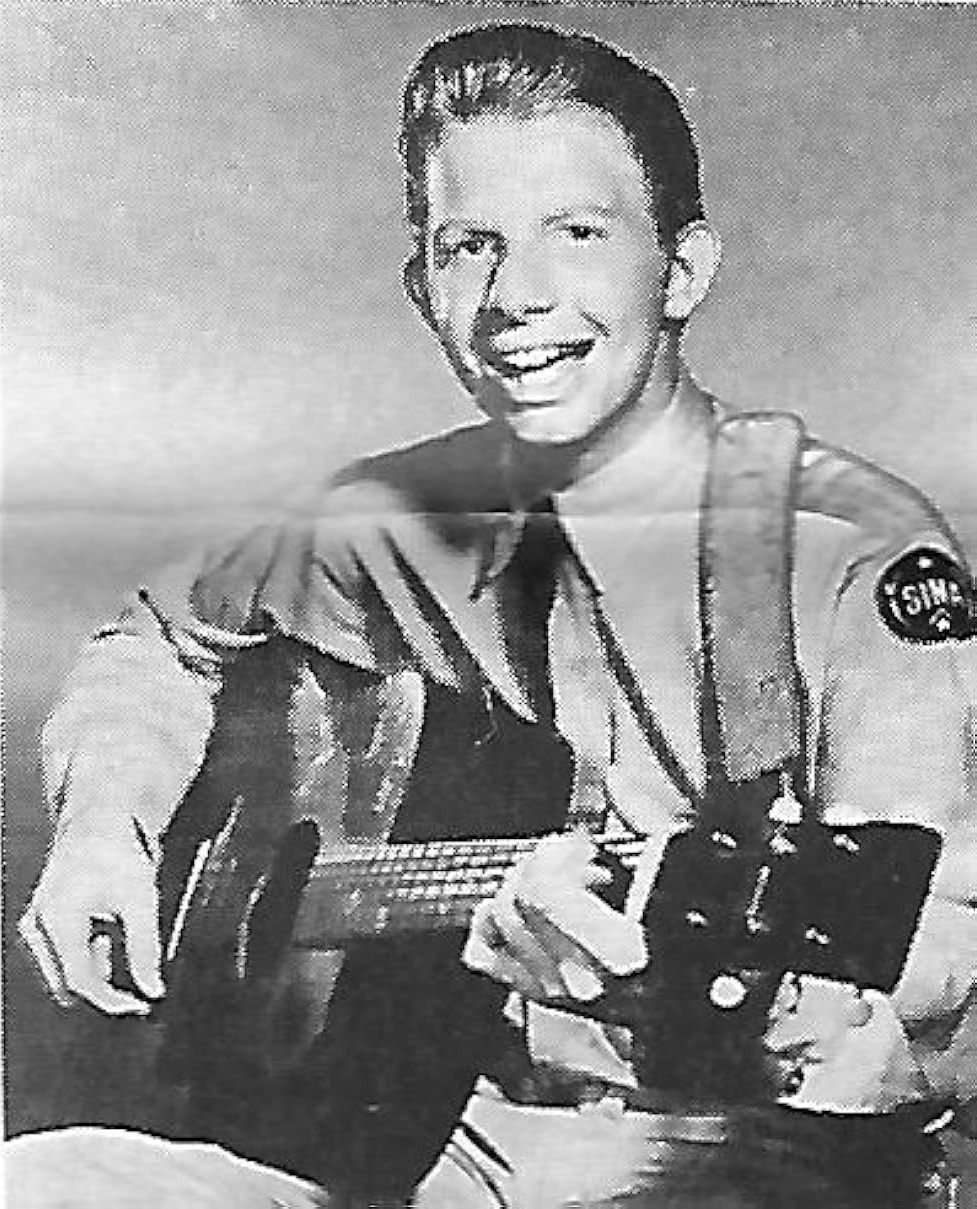
- Publicity photo of Jimmy Boyd for the 1960 film Platinum High School
- Born: James Devon Boyd; January 9, 1939; Jayess, Mississippi, U.S.
- Died: March 7, 2009 (aged 70); Santa Monica, California, U.S.
- Occupations: Actor; musician; singer
- Years active: 1951–1983
- Spouses: Yvonne Craig (m. 1960; div. 1962) Anne Forrey (m. 1980; div. 1984)
- Children: 1

James Devon "Jimmy" Boyd (January 9, 1939 – March 7, 2009) was an American singer, musician, and actor known for his 1952 recording of the song "I Saw Mommy Kissing Santa Claus." The song was a hit, selling more than two and a half million records in its first week.

== Early years ==
Jimmy Boyd was born in 1939 in Mississippi into a musical family, with father Leslie Boyd and mother Winnie Boyd. His father, in turn, was from a family of 21 children of musician Bill Boyd. The family relocated to the San Fernando Valley of Southern California when Jimmy was a pre-schooler. Jimmy briefly sang with Texas Jim Lewis and his Lonestar Cowboys. At an early age, he won a local talent show that led to television appearances, including The Ed Sullivan Show, as well as The Frank Sinatra Show on CBS-TV.

== "I Saw Mommy Kissing Santa Claus" ==
Boyd recorded the song "I Saw Mommy Kissing Santa Claus" for Columbia Records in 1952, when he was 13 years old. It became a hit, selling more than two and a half million records in its first week's release and Boyd's name became known internationally. Boyd was presented with two gold records. Boyd's record went to number one on the charts again the following year at Christmas, and continues to sell as a Christmas song. Cumulative disc sales by 1966 numbered more than 11 million copies.

Boyd owned horses, so Columbia presented him with a silver mounted saddle. Inscribed in the silver plate on the back of the saddle were the words, Presented by Columbia Records to Jimmy Boyd commemorating his 3,000,000 record of "I Saw Mommy Kissing Santa Claus". When first released, the Roman Catholic Archdiocese of Boston condemned the song for implying even a tenuous link between sex and the religious holiday, and radio stations in several markets banned it. Boyd made worldwide news when he went to Boston to explain that, of course, Santa Claus and Daddy were the same man. The following Christmas the ban was lifted.

== Other recordings ==
Boyd's next-biggest hit was "Tell Me a Story," a duet with Frankie Laine, which peaked at number 4 on the charts during 1953. The same year, he recorded "Dennis the Menace," a duet with Rosemary Clooney, which peaked at number 23 on the charts.

One of his surviving performances available online is with Betty White on The Betty White Show in the mid-1950s.

== Acting career ==
In 1956, Boyd played Huckleberry Finn in the United States Steel Hour production of Frank Luther's musical adaptation of Tom Sawyer. Boyd reprised the role a year later when Luther adapted Huck Finn as a musical.

Boyd was a regular cast member on the situation comedy Date with the Angels, starring Betty White, playing the role of Wheeler. After the show was cancelled midway through its only season (1957–58), he went on to become a regular on Bachelor Father for the remainder of its five-year run (1957–62). The popular situation comedy starred John Forsythe and featured Noreen Corcoran and Sammee Tong. Boyd played the role of Howard Meechum, awkward classmate and sometime boyfriend of Corcoran's character Kelly.

During the same period, Boyd appeared in several films, often in dramatic roles. These included the role of schoolboy Howard in Inherit the Wind (1960), a drama starring Spencer Tracy, based on the Scopes Monkey Trial of 1925.

Boyd's acting career was interrupted by military service when he was drafted into the US Army in 1960. Later in the 1960s, he went to Vietnam, but as a celebrity rather than a soldier, appearing alongside other actors and singers in two USO tours.

== Personal life and death ==
In 1960, Boyd married actress Yvonne Craig, whom he met when they were costars in the Bing Crosby musical High Time. The marriage ended in divorce in 1962. Boyd married a second time in 1980 to Anne Forrey. They had a son together, but divorced in 1984. He remained single for the rest of his life. In the late 1980's he worked as a car salesman at Puente Hills Nissan in the City of Industry as he knew one of the owners and lived on a boat at the marina.

Jimmy Boyd died of cancer in 2009 at the age of 70.

== Awards ==
For his contributions to the recording industry, Boyd was awarded a star (located at 7021 Hollywood Blvd.) on the Hollywood Walk of Fame in 1959. It made Boyd (at age 20) the youngest-ever recipient of the honor for 45 years, until actress twins Mary-Kate Olsen and Ashley Olsen (then 18) jointly received a star in 2004.

== Filmography ==
Year	Title	Role	Notes
1954	Racing Blood	David	
1955	The Second Greatest Sex	Newt McClure	
1960	Platinum High School	Bud Starkweather	
1960	Inherit the Wind	Howard	
1960	High Time	Robert Higgson	
1961	The Two Little Bears	Johnny Dillion	
1970	Norwood	Jeeter	
1975	That's the Way of the World	Gary Page	
1978	Mean Dog Blues	Sonny	
1983	Brainstorm	Col. Howe	(final film role)
