= Look at That Girl =

Single by Guy Mitchell Orchestra and Chorus under the direction of Mitch Miller
- B-side: "Hannah Lee"
- Published: May 11, 1953
- Released: June 5, 1953
- Recorded: February 28, 1953
- Genre: Pop, traditional pop
- Length: 2:48
- Label: Columbia Records
- Songwriter: Bob Merrill
- Producer: Mitch Miller

"Look at That Girl" is a 1953 popular song, which was written by Bob Merrill. The song was recorded by Guy Mitchell and produced by Mitch Miller, giving Mitchell his second number one on the UK Singles Chart, where it spent six weeks at the top.

== Background and reception ==
Guy Mitchell first recorded "Look at That Girl" in New York on February 28, 1953, with Mitch Miller and his Orchestra and Chorus. The song was published on May 11, 1953. Mitchell's recording was released on both 45 and 78 rpm formats by Columbia Records on June 5 that year. It did not chart in America, despite receiving positive reviews from Billboard magazine. The single was included in their "New Records to Watch" section, with the magazine noting that "Mitchell sparkles on this Bob Merrill tune."

The single entered the UK Singles Chart on August 28, 1953, and reached No. 1 on September 11, where it stayed for six weeks. In total, it spent 14 weeks on the singles chart.

On the UK's sheet music charts, "Look at That Girl" entered the listings on August 22, 1953, and peaked at No. 6, spending a total of 17 weeks on the chart. The first recordings issued were in July 1953, by Frankie Vaughan with Ken Mackintosh and his Orchestra, and Guy Mitchell. The following month saw a cover by Dennis Lotis and The Stargazers, while a version by Victor Silvester and his Ballroom Orchestra was released in October.

Alberto Semprini, on piano with rhythm accompaniment, recorded the song in London on October 13, 1953, as the third song of the medley "Dancing to the piano (No. 22) - Hit medley of Fox Trots" along with "Bridge of Sighs" and "Is It Any Wonder." The medley was released by EMI on the His Master's Voice label (catalog number B 10592).

== See also ==
- List of number-one singles from the 1950s (UK)
