= David Whitfield =

English singer (1926–1980)

Background information
- Born: 2 February 1926; Kingston upon Hull, East Riding of Yorkshire, England
- Died: 15 January 1980 (aged 53) Sydney, New South Wales, Australia
- Occupation: Singer
- Instrument: Vocals
- Years active: 1952–1980
- Label: Decca Records

David Whitfield (2 February 1926 – 15 January 1980) was a British male tenor vocalist from Kingston upon Hull. In November 1953 he became the first British male artist to have a number one single in the UK with "Answer Me". He died from a brain haemorrhage in Sydney, Australia, while on tour, at the age of 54.

== Life and career ==
Whitfield was born in Kingston upon Hull in the East Riding of Yorkshire. He sang in the choir at his church during his childhood and entertained his fellow members of the Royal Navy during the Second World War. After the war, he stayed in the navy until June 1950, having had a long spell in Singapore, where he broadcast on radio. He appeared on Opportunity Knocks, a talent show on Radio Luxembourg on April 30, 1950, and won his heat. He subsequently appeared on the all-winners show on May 21, 1950, singing "Good-Bye" from White Horse Inn. This led to his joining the touring stage show of Opportunity Knocks, hosted by Hughie Green for a while. After leaving the navy, Whitfield had taken a job in a cement factory, but in 1953 he was given the opportunity to sing in West End cabaret at the Washington Hotel on Curzon Street, where he was a great success. This led to a variety stage tour.

His first recording to reach the Top 10 of the UK Singles Chart in October 1953 was "Bridge of Sighs", written by Billy Reid. "Answer Me" (later recorded with different lyrics as "Answer Me, My Love") reached number one in the UK. Both versions have since been re-issued on CD.

Whitfield had other hits in the 1950s, and was the most successful British male singer in America during that period. In addition, he was the first British male vocalist to earn a gold disc, and the third overall. He was also the first to reach the Top Ten of the Billboard Top 100, and the first artist from Britain to sell over a million copies of a record in the US.

All of his hits were released by the Decca record label in the UK. His only album to reach the UK Albums Chart was The World of David Whitfield, which reached Number 19. He used orchestras, including those of Stanley Black, fellow Decca artist Mantovani and Roland Shaw, as backing accompaniment for his hits.

His most popular recordings were "Answer Me", his first UK chart topper; "Cara Mia", with Mantovani, which earned him a gold disc and gave him his second number one in the UK Singles Chart; "My September Love"; "I'll Find You", the theme music to the 1957 film Sea Wife, starring Joan Collins and Richard Burton; and "William Tell", the theme music to the television series The Adventures of William Tell.

"Cara Mia" spent ten weeks at top of the charts in the UK, making it one of the biggest selling British records in the pre-rock era; the recording co-credits Mantovani and his Orchestra and Chorus. Whitfield appeared on The Ed Sullivan Show and the 1954 Royal Command Performance. He continued to perform regularly across the globe, while continuing to live in Hull.

Many of his singles were issued on LP, and have been reissued in recent years on CD compilations under licence. There were three 45 rpm EP special releases (1959–60), one entitled The Good Old Songs and the other two featuring numbers from Rose Marie and The Desert Song, two musical shows in which Whitfield toured. On leaving Decca he recorded two singles for His Master's Voice (1962–63). His last LP, made for Philips in 1975 and entitled Hey There! It's David Whitfield, included his third recording of "Cara Mia" (he had already recorded a stereo re-make for Decca in 1966 for an album entitled Great Songs for Young Lovers). Whitfield's last single was for Denman, a coupling of "Land of Hope and Glory" and "When You Lose the One You Love" (1977).

He died from a brain haemorrhage in Sydney, Australia, while on tour at the age of 54.

A statue in memory of Whitfield was unveiled outside the New Theatre in Hull on 31 August 2012, before the opening night of a show celebrating his life and music.

== See also ==
- Early British popular music
- List of artists under the Decca Records label
- List of artists who reached number one on the UK Singles Chart
