= Max Bygraves =

British entertainer (1922–2012)

Max Bygraves OBE
- Bygraves in 1976
- Born: Walter William Bygraves; 16 October 1922; Rotherhithe, London, England
- Died: 31 August 2012 (aged 89); Hope Island, Queensland, Australia
- Occupations: Comedian; singer; actor; variety performer
- Years active: 1943–2006
- Spouse: Gladys "Blossom" Murray (m. 1942; died 2011)
- Children: 6

Walter William "Max" Bygraves (16 October 1922 – 31 August 2012) was an English comedian, singer, actor and variety performer. He appeared on his own television shows, sometimes performing comedy sketches between songs.

He made twenty Royal Variety Performance appearances and presented numerous programmes, including Family Fortunes between 1983 and 1985. His catchphrase "I wanna tell you a story" became an integral part of his act, although it had originated with comedian Mike Yarwood impersonating Bygraves.

== Early life ==
Bygraves was born to Henry and Lillian (née McDonnell) Bygraves (who wed in 1919) in Rotherhithe in London, where he grew up in a two-room council flat in Park Buildings, Paradise Street with his five siblings, his parents and a grandparent. His father was a professional flyweight boxer, known as Battling Tom Smith, and a casual dockworker. Brought up Catholic, he attended St Joseph's School, Paradise Street, Rotherhithe, and sang with his school choir at Westminster Cathedral.

He left school at 14, working at the Savoy Hotel in London as a pageboy, but was sacked for being too tall. He later put some of his success as a variety performer down to his lanky physique. He was 6 feet 3 inches (1.91 m) tall, but weighed only 13 stone (83 kg) in adult life. He then became a messenger for W S Crawfords, an advertising agency at 233 High Holborn before serving as a fitter in the Royal Air Force in the Second World War and working as a carpenter. He changed his name to Max Bygraves in honour of comedian Max Miller.

== Career ==
After the end of the war, Bygraves worked on building sites, while entertaining in pubs in the evenings. An early variety stage appearance in January 1945 was at the Grand, Clapham with a review stating "A new impressionist. Max Bygraves, is also a lad to be watched. He has a little to learn in the art of showmanship, but not much, but there is no denying the brilliance of his impersonations."

In August 1946, he toured in a variety show with Frankie Howerd, who in turn introduced him to Eric Sykes, and they began writing routines together. With Sykes, he also developed the radio show Educating Archie, starring ventriloquist Peter Brough and his dummy Archie Andrews, and featuring Bygraves in the role of Archie's teacher. The idea for the programme came from record producer Wally Ridley, who produced Bygraves' records during the 1950s.

In July 1950, he made his first appearance at the London Palladium supporting Abbott and Costello, and in 1951 he supported Judy Garland in her appearance there. Arising from this, she invited him to perform at the Palace in New York in October 1951.

Bygraves became a successful recording artist with seven top ten hits on the UK Singles Chart between 1952 and 1960. Many were novelty songs. One of his most popular recordings, "You Need Hands" in 1958, was written by Bygraves under the pseudonym Roy Irwin (or Erwin), a name picked at random from a telephone directory. He also wrote its follow-up, "Gotta Have Rain". His producer Wally Ridley said of Bygraves:

Max's great talent was that he could punch lines, which was absolutely great for us. We'd give him songs with very short lines and he'd punch them out marvellously. Give him a long line and he would stumble over it, although I just flipped when I was given "Gilly Gilly Ossenfeffer Katzenellen Bogen by the Sea". I thought, "Fabulous, fabulous, this is a major hit for us." I took it to Max and his wife, Blossom, said, "That's no good, what does it mean?" ... The song was absolutely perfect for Max and its whole secret was "What the hell does it mean?"

He also occasionally worked as an actor, appearing in British films including Bless 'Em All (1948) and Tom Brown's Schooldays (1951). Bygraves appeared as himself in the 1954 British film musical Harmony Lane directed by Lewis Gilbert. He portrayed the title character in the 1956 film Charley Moon and starred in the 1961 drama Spare the Rod. In 1959, Bygraves bought the past and future rights to the Lionel Bart musical Oliver! for £350 at a time when Bart was experiencing severe financial difficulties. Bygraves later sold them for £250,000.

In the 1950s and 1960s, Bygraves appeared as a guest on several television variety programmes, both in the UK and United States. These included Ed Sullivan, Jack Benny and Jackie Gleason, in America. He was the subject of This Is Your Life in 1961 when he was surprised by Eamonn Andrews while rehearsing his new show, Do Re Mi at London's Prince of Wales Theatre. He appeared in several TV series including the sitcom Roamin' Holiday and the variety shows Max and Max Bygraves at the Royalty. From 1983 to 1985, Bygraves hosted Family Fortunes, taking over from his friend and fellow comedian Bob Monkhouse. He would later be succeeded as host in 1987 by Les Dennis.

From 1972, Bygraves recorded a series of albums, Sing Along With Max (later Singalongamax), in which he sang medleys of familiar songs aimed at an older audience. The albums, for Pye Records, sold millions of copies and led to spinoff shows and more recordings. In 1977, UK publishing house W. H. Allen published Bygraves' comic novel The Milkman's on His Way.

Bygraves' catchphrase was said to be: "I wanna tell you a story". Another well-known phrase of his was "That's a good idea, son!".

== Honours ==
In 1982, Bygraves was made an Officer of the Order of the British Empire (OBE).

== Personal life ==
Bygraves married WAAF sergeant Gladys "Blossom" Murray in 1942. The couple had three children.

On 9 August 1974, Bygraves became trapped on a cliff-face near his house in Westbourne, Bournemouth, while attempting to retrieve a kite flown by his grandson which had become stuck beneath the edge of the cliff. Bygraves suffered friction burns on his hands and was in shock when police and firefighters helped him to safety. In 1999, Bygraves underwent treatment for an ear disorder, having cancelled a number of performances on his doctor's advice.

He and Blossom Bygraves moved from Bournemouth to Queensland, Australia, in 2008. She died there in 2011 at the age of 89.

== Death ==
Bygraves was diagnosed with Alzheimer's disease in 2010, and he died from complications of this illness at his daughter's home in Hope Island, Queensland, Australia on the evening of 31 August 2012.

== Television ==
- Whack-O! (1960)
- The Royal Variety Performance (1961; 1963 etc.)
- The Jack Benny Program (1963, season 13, episode 13)
- It's Sad About Eddie (1964)
- Max Bygraves meets The Black and White Minstrels (1965, 1 episode)
- Max Thames Television (1968–72 including The Max Bygraves Hour 1970 and The Max Bygraves Show 1972)
- Max at the Royalty (1972)
- SingalongaMax (1973)
- Max ATV (1974)
- Max Bygraves Says "I Wanna Tell You a Story" (1975–77)
- Max's Holiday Hour (1977)
- Lingalongamax (1978–80 including hour long special From Max with Love 1979)
- Max Thames Television (1981)
- Max Rolls On (1982)
- Max Bygraves – Side by Side (1982)
- Family Fortunes (1983–85, 42 episodes)
- The Mind of David Berglas (1986)
- Call Up the Stars (1995)
- Against the Odds RAF Documentary (2001)

== Partial filmography ==
- Bless 'Em All (1948)
- The Nitwits on Parade (1949)
- Skimpy in the Navy (1949)
- Tom Brown's Schooldays (1951)
- Charley Moon (1956)
- A Cry from the Streets (1958)
- Bobbikins (1959)
- Spare the Rod (1961)
- The Alf Garnett Saga (1972)
- The Jigsaw Man (1983) Uncredited cameo appearance (policeman)

== Discography ==
=== Chart singles ===
| Year | Single | Chart Positions |
| Year | Single | UK |
|---|---|---|
| 1952 | "Cowpuncher's Cantata" | 6 |
| 1954 | "Heart of My Heart" | 7 |
| 1954 | "Gilly Gilly Ossenfeffer Katzenellen Bogen By The Sea" | 7 |
| 1955 | "Mr Sandman" | 16 |
| 1955 | "Meet Me on the Corner" | 2 |
| 1956 | "Ballad of Davy Crockett" | 20 |
| 1956 | "Out of Town" | 18 |
| 1957 | "Heart" | 16 |
| 1958 | "You Need Hands" / "Tulips from Amsterdam" | 3 |
| 1958 | "Little Train" / "Gotta Have Rain" | 28 |
| 1959 | "My Ukulele" | 19 |
| 1959 | "Jingle Bell Rock" | 7 |
| 1960 | "Fings Ain't Wot They Used T'Be" | 5 |
| 1960 | "Consider Yourself" | 50 |
| 1961 | "Bells of Avignon" | 36 |
| 1969 | "You're My Everything" | 34 |
| 1973 | "Deck of Cards" | 13 |
| 1989 | "White Christmas" | 71 |

=== Albums ===
- Show Stoppers (1962)
- Sing Along with Max (1972) No. 4
- Sing Along with Max Vol. 2 (1972) No. 11
- Singalongamax Vol. 3 (1973) No. 5
- Singalongamax Vol. 4 (1973) No. 7
- Singalongapartysong (1973) No. 15
- You Make Me Feel Like Singing a Song (1974) No. 39
- Singalongaxmas (1974) No. 21
- 100 Golden Greats (1976) No. 3
- Lingalongamax (1978) No. 39
- Discolongamax (1979) No. 47
- The Song and Dance Men (1978) No. 67
- Singalongawaryears (1989) No. 5
- Singalongawaryears Volume 2 (1989) No. 33
