= I Saw Mommy Kissing Santa Claus =

- Ten-inch shellac variant of US picture sleeve

Single by Jimmy Boyd
- Language: English
- B-side: "Thumbelina"
- Released: 1952
- Recorded: 1952
- Label: Columbia
- Songwriter: Tommie Connor

"I Saw Mommy Kissing Santa Claus" is a Christmas song with music and lyrics by British songwriter Tommie Connor and first recorded by American singer Jimmy Boyd in 1952. The song has since been covered by many artists, with the Ronettes's 1963 and the Jackson 5's 1970 versions being the most famous.

== Jimmy Boyd original version ==
The original recording by Jimmy Boyd, recorded on 15 July 1952, when he was 13 years old, reached No. 1 on the Billboard pop singles chart in December 1952, and on the Cash Box chart at the beginning of the following year. It later reached number three in the UK Singles Chart when released there in November 1953. The song was commissioned by Saks Fifth Avenue to promote the store's Christmas card for the year, which featured an original sketch by artist Perry Barlow, who drew for The New Yorker for many decades.

The song describes a scene where a child walks downstairs from his bedroom on Christmas Eve to see his mother kissing Santa Claus under the mistletoe. The lyric concludes with the child wondering how his father will react on hearing of the kiss, unaware of the possibility that Santa Claus is merely his father in a costume.

It was reported that Boyd's record was condemned by the Roman Catholic Church and banned in Boston when it was released, believing that it described an adulterous encounter. The story goes that Boyd was then photographed meeting with the Archdiocese of Boston to explain the joke behind the song, after which the ban was lifted. However, the Archdiocese has no records of any ban, and no contemporaneous records or photographs can be found of a meeting between Boyd and any officials, leading the story to appear as a myth or an urban legend.

== Cover versions ==
External media

Audio
- Version by the Ronnettes on YouTube

Video
- Official animated music video of the Jackson 5 version on YouTube
- Official lyric video of the Jackson 5 version on YouTube
- Performance video of the John Mellencamp version on YouTube
- Video of live performance by the Beverley Sisters on YouTube

A slightly less successful version of the song (#7 on the US Charts) was released in 1952 by Spike Jones (with vocal by George Rock in the little boy voice used in Spike's hit "All I Want For Christmas Is My Two Front Teeth"). Jones also recorded a parody for his personal pleasure titled "I Saw Mommy Screwing Santa Claus."

A recording by 13-year-old Molly Bee appeared on the US Country charts in 1952.

Versions by the Beverley Sisters and by Billy Cotton and His Band charted on the UK Singles Chart in December 1953, peaking at, respectively, No. 6 and No. 11.

In 1962, The Four Seasons released a version of the song on their Christmas album The 4 Seasons Greetings. This version differs from the others as it features the distinct falsetto of Frankie Valli.

The Ronettes recorded their own version in 1963 for A Christmas Gift for You from Phil Spector. This version both debuted and peaked at No. 84 on Billboard's Holiday 100 chart on the week ending 10 December 2016.

The Jackson 5 recorded the song for their 1970 Christmas album. The version entered the UK Singles Chart at its peak position, No. 91, on the week ending 5 December 1987, and charting for four weeks total. It also peaked at No. 30 on Billboard's Holiday 100 chart on the week ending 2 December 2023, at No. 43 on Billboard's Hot 100 chart on the week ending 6 January 2024, and at No. 100 on a Swiss singles chart on the week ending 29 December 2019.

John Cougar Mellencamp recorded the song in 1987 that was included on the first A Very Special Christmas compilation album, which benefits the Special Olympics.

In 2000, the Jogress Shinkers from Digimon Adventure 02 was covered the song in Japanese language on the anime christmas album Digimon Adventure 02: Christmas Fantasy.

== Film adaptation ==
A made-for-television movie based on the song was released in 2001.

== Charts ==
=== Jimmy Boyd version ===
Weekly chart performance for "I Saw Mommy Kissing Santa Claus" by Jimmy Boyd
Chart (1953)	Peak position
UK Singles (Official Charts)	3

=== Billy Cotton and His Band version ===
Weekly chart performance for "I Saw Mommy Kissing Santa Claus" by Billy Cotton and His Band
Chart (1953)	Peak position
UK Singles (Official Charts)	11

=== Beverley Sisters version ===
Weekly chart performance for "I Saw Mommy Kissing Santa Claus" by Beverley Sisters
Chart (1953)	Peak position
UK Singles (Official Charts)	6

=== The Jackson 5 version ===
==== Weekly charts ====
Weekly chart performance for "I Saw Mommy Kissing Santa Claus" by the Jackson 5
Chart (2009–2026)	Peak position
Australia (ARIA)	97
Canada (Canadian Hot 100)	45
Estonia Airplay (TopHit)	25
Global 200 (Billboard)	65
Netherlands (Single Top 100)	94
Japan (Japan Hot 100)	22
Portugal (AFP)	146
Switzerland (Schweizer Hitparade)	100
UK Singles (Official Charts)	84
US Billboard Hot 100	43
US Holiday 100 (Billboard)	30

==== Monthly charts ====
Monthly chart performance
Chart (2025)	Peak position
Estonia Airplay (TopHit)	52

== Certifications ==
=== The Ronettes version ===
Certifications for "I Saw Mommy Kissing Santa Claus" by the Ronettes
Region	Certification	Certified units/sales
United Kingdom (BPI)	Silver	200,000^{‡}
^{‡} Sales+streaming figures based on certification alone.

=== The Jackson 5 version ===
Certifications for "I Saw Mommy Kissing Santa Claus" by the Jackson 5
Region	Certification	Certified units/sales
Denmark (IFPI Danmark)	Gold	45,000^{‡}
United Kingdom (BPI)	Silver	200,000^{‡}
^{‡} Sales+streaming figures based on certification alone.
