= Lonnie Donegan discography =

- Studio albums: 12
- EPs: 14
- Live albums: 6
- Compilation albums: 14
- Singles: 60
- Box sets: 2

This is the discography of British skiffle singer Lonnie Donegan.

== Albums ==
=== Studio albums ===
Title	Album details	Peak chart positions
Title	Album details	UK
New Orleans Joys (credited to Chris Barber's Jazz Band and Skiffle Group)	Released: November 1954; Label: Decca; Formats: LP	—
Lonnie Donegan Showcase	Released: November 1956; Label: Pye Nixa, Mercury; Formats: LP; Released in North America with additional tracks as An Englishman Sings American Folk Songs	2
Lonnie	Released: July 1958; Label: Pye Nixa, Dot; Formats: LP; Released in North America as Lonnie Donegan with additional tracks	3
Lonnie Rides Again	Released: November 1959; Label: Pye Nixa, Atlantic; Formats: LP; Released in North America as Skiffle Folk Music with a different track listing	—
Sing Hallelujah	Released: November 1962; Label: Pye, ABC-Paramount; Formats: LP	—
The Lonnie Donegan Folk Album	Released: August 1965; Label: Pye; Formats: LP	—
Lonniepops – Lonnie Donegan Today	Released: 1970; Label: Decca; Formats: LP	—
Lonnie Donegan Meets Leinemann (with Leinemann)	Released: 1974; Label: Philips; Formats: LP; Released in Germany	—
Country Roads (with Leinemann)	Released: 1976; Label: Philips; Formats: LP; Released in Germany	—
Puttin' On the Style	Released: February 1978; Label: Chrysalis, United Artists; Formats: LP, MC	51
Sundown	Released: November 1978; Label: Chrysalis; Formats: LP, MC	—
Muleskinner Blues	Released: 8 February 1999; Label: Capo/RCA; Formats: CD	—
"—" denotes releases that did not chart or were not released in that territory.

=== Live albums ===
Title	Album details	Peak chart positions
Title	Album details	UK
The Great Re-Union Album (credited as by Chris Barber, reunion of Chris Barber's Jazz Band)	Released: February 1977; Label: Black Lion; Formats: 2xLP	—
Jubilee Concert	Released: November 1981; Label: Cube; Formats: 2xLP	—
Live 1957 – The Complete Conway Hall Concert	Released: June 1999; Label: Zircon; Formats: CD	—
The Skiffle Sessions – Live in Belfast (with Van Morrison and Chris Barber)	Released: 17 January 2000; Label: Exile/Virgin; Formats: CD, MC	14
This Yere De Story – His Life Story in His Own Words and Music	Released: 2004; Label: Upbeat Jazz; Formats: CD	—
The Last Tour	Released: October 2006; Label: Upbeat Recordings; Formats: CD	—
"—" denotes releases that did not chart.

=== Compilation albums ===
Title	Album details	Peak chart positions
Title	Album details	UK
Tops with Lonnie	Released: June 1959; Label: Pye Nixa; Formats: LP	—
More Tops with Lonnie	Released: October 1961; Label: Pye; Formats: LP	—
A Golden Age of Donegan	Released: August 1962; Label: Pye Golden Guinea; Formats: LP	3
A Golden Age of Donegan Volume Two	Released: January 1963; Label: Pye Golden Guinea; Formats: LP	15
The Hit Singles Collection	Released: 5 October 1987; Label: PRT; Formats: 2xCD, 2xLP, MC; Released in the US	—
The EP Collection	Released: 25 May 1992; Label: See for Miles; Formats: CD, MC	—
Rock Island Line – The Best of Lonnie Donegan and His Skiffle Group	Released: 29 June 1992; Label: Kaz; Formats: CD, 2xMC	—
King of Skiffle	Released: 1994; Label: Castle Communications; Formats: CD, MC	—
Talking Guitar Blues – The Very Best of Lonnie Donegan	Released: 1999; Label: Castle Music; Formats: 2xCD	—
Rock Island Line – The Singles Anthology 1955–1967	Released: 2002; Label: Castle Music; Formats: 3xCD	—
Puttin' On the Style – The Greatest Hits	Released: February 2003; Label: Sanctuary; Formats: CD	45
My Old Man's a Dustman – The Singles As & Bs 1954–61	Released: 16 November 2012; Label: Jasmine; Formats: digital download	—
Singles Collection 1955–1962	Released: 29 April 2016; Label: Real Gone Music; Formats: 4xCD	—
Gold	Released: 16 April 2021; Label: Crimson; Formats: 3xCD, LP	—
"—" denotes releases that did not chart.

=== Box sets ===
Title	Album details
More Than 'Pye in the Sky'	Released: 1993; Label: Bear Family; Formats: 8xCD; Released in Germany
The Collection	Released: August 2010; Label: Sanctuary; Formats: 5xCD

== EPs ==
Title	EP details	Peak chart positions
Title	EP details	UK
Backstairs Session	Released: October 1955; Label: Polygon Jazz Today; Formats: 7"	—
The Lonnie Donegan Skiffle Group	Released: 1956; Label: Decca; Formats: 7"	—
Skiffle Session	Released: June 1956; Label: Pye Jazz; Formats: 7"	20
Lonnie Donegan Hit Parade	Released: January 1957; Label: Pye Nixa; Formats: 7"	—
Lonnie Donegan Hit Parade Vol. II	Released: June 1957; Label: Pye Nixa; Formats: 7"	—
Lonnie Donegan Hit Parade Vol. III	Released: October 1957; Label: Pye Nixa; Formats: 7"	—
Donegan on Stage	Released: March 1958; Label: Pye Nixa; Formats: 7"	—
Lonnie Donegan Hit Parade Vol. IV	Released: May 1958; Label: Pye Nixa; Formats: 7"	—
Lonnie Donegan Hit Parade Vol. V	Released: 1959; Label: Pye Nixa; Formats: 7"	—
Relax with Lonnie	Released: March 1959; Label: Pye Nixa; Formats: 7"	—
Lonnie Donegan Hit Parade Vol. VI	Released: September 1959; Label: Pye Nixa; Formats: 7"	—
Yankee Doodle Donegan	Released: September 1960; Label: Pye; Formats: 7"	—
Lonnie Donegan Hit Parade Vol. VII	Released: January 1961; Label: Pye; Formats: 7"	—
Lonnie Donegan Hit Parade Vol. VIII	Released: 1961; Label: Pye; Formats: 7"	—
"—" denotes releases that did not chart or were not released in that territory.

== Singles ==
Title (A-side/B-side) (Note: The B-sides listed are for the UK releases of the singles except where not applicable. Various other songs were released as B-sides to the main A-sides in other countries.)	Year	Peak chart positions							
Title (A-side/B-side)	Year	UK	AUS	CAN	GER	IRE	NOR	NZ	US
"Rock Island Line" (Note: Both sides credited as the Lonnie Donegan Skiffle Group.) b/w "John Henry"	1955	8	3	—	—	—	—	—	8
"Diggin' My Potatoes" b/w "Bury My Body"	1956	—	—	—	—	—	—	—	—
"Midnight Special" (Note: Both sides credited as Lonnie Donegan's Skiffle Group.) b/w "When the Sun Goes Down"	1956	—	—	—	—	—	—	—	—
"Lost John" b/w "Stewball"	1956	2	—	—	—	—	—	—	58
"Bring a Little Water, Sylvie" (Note: Credited as Lonnie Donegan and His Skiffle Group.) b/w "Dead or Alive"	1956	7	—	—	—	—	—	—	—
"On a Christmas Day" (Note: Both sides with Chris Barber's Jazz Band.) b/w "Take My Hand, Precious Lord"	1956	—	—	—	—	—	—	—	—
"Don't You Rock Me Daddy-O" b/w "I'm Alabammy Bound"	1957	4	—	—	—	—	—	—	—
"Cumberland Gap" b/w "Love Is Strange"	1957	1	—	—	—	—	—	—	—
"Gamblin' Man" b/w "Putting On the Style"	1957	1	—	—	—	—	—	—	—
"My Dixie Darling" b/w "I'm Just a Rollin' Stone"	1957	10	—	—	—	—	—	—	—
"Jack O'Diamonds" b/w "Ham 'n' Eggs"	1958	14	—	—	—	—	—	—	—
"Nobody Loves an Irishman" b/w "The Grand Coulee Dam"	1958	— 6	—	—	—	—	—	—	—
"Sally Don't You Grieve" b/w "Betty, Betty, Betty"	1958	11	—	—	—	—	—	—	—
"Times Are Getting Hard Boys" b/w "Lonesome Traveller"	1958	— 28	—	—	—	—	—	—	—
"Lonnie's Skiffle Party (Part 1)" b/w "Lonnie's Skiffle Party (Part 2)"	1958	23	—	—	—	—	—	—	—
"Tom Dooley" b/w "Rock o' My Soul"	1958	3	—	—	—	—	—	—	—
"Does Your Chewing Gum Lose Its Flavour (On the Bedpost Overnight?)" b/w "Aunt Rhody (The Old Grey Goose)"	1959	3	5	20	—	5	—	—	5
"Fort Worth Jail" b/w "Whoa Buck"	1959	14	—	—	—	—	—	—	—
"Battle of New Orleans" b/w "Darling Corey"	1959	2	—	—	—	1	—	—	—
"Hold Back Tomorrow" (Note: Both sides credited as Miki and Griff with the Lonnie Donegan Group.) b/w "Deedle-Dum-Doo-Die-Day"	1959	26	—	—	—	—	—	—	—
"Sal's Got a Sugar Lip" (Note: Side credited as Lonnie Donegan and His Skiffle Group.) b/w "Chesapeake Bay" (Note: Credited as with Ian Menzies and His Clyde Valley Stompers.)	1959	13	—	—	—	—	—	—	—
"Kevin Barry" (Note: "Kevin Barry" was only released as a single in Ireland.) b/w "My Laggan Love"	1959	—	—	—	—	5	—	—	—
"San Miguel" b/w "Talking Guitar Blues"	1959	19	77	—	—	—	—	—	—
"My Old Man's a Dustman (Ballad of a Refuse Disposal Officer)" (Note: Both sides credited as Lonnie Donegan and His Group.) b/w "The Golden Vanity"	1960	1	1	1	—	1	—	—	—
"I Wanna Go Home (The Wreck of the John 'B')" b/w "Jimmie Brown the Newsboy"	1960	5	— 93	—	—	8	—	7	—
"Lorelei" b/w "In All My Wildest Dreams"	1960	10	—	—	—	—	—	—	—
"Lively" b/w "Black Cat (Cross My Path Today)"	1960	13	29	—	—	10	—	1	—
"Virgin Mary" b/w "Beyond the Sunset"	1960	27	—	—	—	—	—	—	—
"(Bury Me) Beneath the Willow" b/w "Leave My Woman Alone"	1961	—	—	—	—	—	—	—	—
"Have a Drink on Me" b/w "Seven Daffodils"	1961	8	20	7	50	5	—	5	—
"Michael, Row the Boat" b/w "Lumbered"	1961	6	80	—	4	2	10	—	—
"The Comancheros" b/w "Ramblin' Round" (Note: Side credited as Lonnie Donegan and His Group.)	1962	14	—	—	—	—	—	—	—
"The Party's Over" b/w "Over the Rainbow"	1962	9	—	—	—	—	—	—	—
"I'll Never Fall in Love Again" b/w "Keep on the Sunny Side"	1962	—	—	—	—	—	—	—	—
"Pick a Bale of Cotton" b/w "Steal Away"	1962	11	—	—	—	8	—	—	—
"The Market Song" (Note: Both sides with Max Miller.) b/w "Tit-Bits"	1962	—	—	—	—	—	—	—	—
"Losing by a Hair" b/w "Trumpet Sounds"	1963	—	—	—	—	—	—	—	—
"A Very Good Year" b/w "Rise Up"	1963	—	—	—	—	—	—	—	—
"Lemon Tree" b/w "I've Gotta Gal So Fine"	1963	—	—	—	—	—	—	—	—
"500 Miles Away from Home" b/w "This Train"	1963	—	—	—	—	—	—	—	—
"Beans in My Ears" b/w "It's a Long Road to Travel"	1964	—	—	—	—	—	—	—	—
"Fisherman's Luck" b/w "There's a Big Wheel"	1964	—	—	—	—	—	—	—	—
"Get Out of My Life" b/w "Won't You Tell Me"	1965	—	—	—	—	—	—	—	—
"Louisiana Man" b/w "Bound for Zion"	1965	—	—	—	—	—	—	—	—
"World Cup Willie" b/w "Where in This World Are We Going"	1965	53	—	—	—	—	—	—	—
"Auntie Maggie's Remedy" b/w "My Sweet Marie"	1966	—	—	—	—	—	—	—	—
"Come to Australia (Great Uncle Albert Is Dead)" (Note: "Come to Australia (Great Uncle Albert Is Dead)" was credited as Lonnie Donegan Group and was only released as a single in Australia.) b/w "Bol Weevil Blues"	1967	—	—	—	—	—	—	—	—
"Toys" b/w "Relax Your Mind"	1968	—	—	—	—	—	—	—	—
"My Lovely Juanita" b/w "Who Knows Where the Time Goes?"	1969	—	—	—	—	—	—	—	—
"Burning Bridges" b/w "Till I Can't Take It Anymore"	1970	—	—	—	—	—	—	—	—
"Don't Blame the Child" b/w "Come to Australia (Great Uncle Albert Is Dead)"	1971	—	—	—	—	—	—	—	—
"Speak to the Sky" b/w "Get Out of My Life"	1972	—	—	—	—	—	—	—	—
"Who's Gonna Play This Old Piano" (Note: Both sides with Kenny Ball.) b/w "South"	1973	—	—	—	—	—	—	—	—
"Lost John" (live) b/w "Jenny's Ball" (live)	1976	—	—	—	—	—	—	—	—
"I've Lost My Little Willie" b/w "Censored"	1976	—	—	—	—	—	—	—	—
"Rock Island Line" (re-recording) b/w "Ham 'n' Eggs" (re-recording)	1978	—	—	—	—	—	—	—	—
"Puttin' On the Style" (re-recording) b/w "Drop Down Baby"	1978	—	—	—	—	—	—	—	—
"Cumberland Gap"/"Wabash Cannonball"/"Don't You Rock Me Daddy-O" (medley) (Note: Both sides with the Shakin' Pyramids.) b/w "Only My Pillow" / "Grab It and Growl"	1981	—	—	—	—	—	—	—	—
"Donegans Dancing Sunshine Band" (Note: Both sides credited as Donegans Dancing Sunshine Band.) b/w "Leaving Blues"	1987	—	—	—	—	—	—	—	—
"I Wanna Go Home" (Note: Both sides with Van Morrison and Chris Barber.) b/w "New Burying Ground" / "Midnight Special"	2000	95	—	—	—	—	—	—	—
"—" denotes releases that did not chart or were not released in that territory.
