= List of UK top-five albums in 1956 =

The UK Albums Chart is one of many music charts compiled by the Official Charts Company that calculates the best-selling albums of the week in the United Kingdom. Before 2004, the chart was only based on the sales of physical albums. Melody Maker magazine published the United Kingdom album charts for the first time in 1956. This list shows albums that peaked in the Top 5 of the UK Albums Chart during 1956, as well as albums which peaked in 1957 but were in the top 5 in 1956. The entry date is when the album appeared in the top 5 for the first time (week ending, as published by the Official Charts Company, which is six days after the chart is announced).

Fifteen albums were in the top five this year. High Society credited to Various artists was released in 1956 but did not reach its peak until 1957. Two artists scored multiple entries in the top 5 in 1956 (excluding Various artists, who are all different performers under the same name). Bill Haley & His Comets, Elvis Presley, Frank Sinatra, Lonnie Donegan and Mario Lanza are among the many artists who achieved their first UK charting top 5 album in 1956.

The first album to reach number-one in the United Kingdom was Songs for Swingin' Lovers by Frank Sinatra. Six different albums peaked at number-one in 1956, with albums credited to Various artists (3) having the most albums hit that position.

== Background ==
=== Multiple entries ===
Fifteen albums charted in the top 5 in 1956, with fourteen albums reaching their peak this year.

Two artists scored multiple entries in the top 5 in 1956.

=== Chart debuts ===
Seven artists achieved their first top 5 album in 1956 as a lead artist. Of these, two went on to record another hit album that year: Bill Haley & His Comets and Mel Tormé.

The following table (collapsed on desktop site) does not include featured appearances on compilations or other artists recordings.

Artist	Number of top 10s	First entry	Chart position	Other entries
Frank Sinatra	1	Songs for Swingin' Lovers	1	—
Mel Tormé	2	Mel Tormé at the Crescendo	3	Mel Tormé and the Marty Paich Dek-Tette (3)
Louis Armstrong	1	Louis Armstrong at the Crescendo, Vol. 1	4	—
Bill Haley & His Comets	2	Rock Around the Clock	2	Rock 'n Roll Stage Show (1)
Mario Lanza	1	Songs from The Student Prince and Other Famous Melodies	5	—
Elvis Presley	1	Elvis Presley Rock 'n' Roll	1	—
Lonnie Donegan	1	Lonnie Donegan Showcase	2	—

Notes

Several albums recorded by the casts of different musicals reached the top 10 and were all credited by the Official Charts Company to Original Soundtrack, despite being recorded by different artists. They are noted down here as Various artists but are not in the "Chart Debuts" list.

=== Soundtrack albums ===
Cast recordings from various films and musicals made the top 5 this year. These included Rodgers and Hammerstein's Carousel, The Eddy Duchin Story, High Society, The King and I, Rodgers and Hammerstein's Oklahoma!, Salad Days and Songs from The Student Prince.

== Top-five albums ==
Key

Symbol	Meaning
♦	Album released in 1956 but peaked in 1957.
(#)	Year-end top ten album position and rank
Entered	The date that the album first appeared in the chart.
Peak	Highest position that the song reached in the UK Albums Chart.

Entered (week ending)	Weeks in top 10	Single	Artist	Peak	Peak reached (week ending)	Weeks at peak
28 July 1956	13	Songs for Swingin' Lovers ^{[A]}	Frank Sinatra	1	28 July 1956	3
28 July 1956	25	Rodgers and Hammerstein's Carousel: Original Soundtrack ^{[B]}^{[C]}	Various artists	1	11 August 1956	6
28 July 1956	4	Gene Norman Presents Mel Tormé At The Crescendo	Mel Tormé	3	28 July 1956	4
28 July 1956	1	Louis Armstrong at the Crescendo, Vol. 1	Louis Armstrong	4	28 July 1956	1
28 July 1956	67	Rodgers and Hammerstein's Oklahoma!: Original Soundtrack ^{[B]}^{[D]}	Various artists	1	29 September 1956	3
4 August 1956	19	Rock Around the Clock ^{[E]}	Bill Haley & His Comets	2	22 September 1956	2
11 August 1956	1	Songs from The Student Prince and Other Famous Melodies	Mario Lanza	5	11 August 1956	1
18 August 1956	4	Mel Tormé and the Marty Paich Dek-Tette	Mel Tormé with Marty Paich and his Dek-Tette	3	25 August 1956	1
25 August 1956	4	The Eddy Duchin Story: Original Soundtrack ^{[B]}	Various artists	3	1 September 1956	1
22 September 1956	94	The King and I: Original Soundtrack ^{[B]}^{[F]}	Various artists	1	13 October 1956	48
29 September 1956	1	Salad Days	London Cast	5	29 September 1956	1
20 October 1956	8	Rock 'n Roll Stage Show ^{[G]}	Bill Haley & His Comets	1	27 October 1956	1
3 November 1956	7	Elvis Presley Rock 'N' Roll	Elvis Presley	1	10 November 1956	1
17 November 1956	22	Lonnie Donegan Showcase	Lonnie Donegan	2	1 December 1956	7
22 December 1956	26	High Society: Original Soundtrack ♦ ^{[B]}	Various artists	1	16 February 1957	1

== Entries by artist ==
The following table shows artists who achieved two or more top 5 entries in 1956. The figures only include main artists, with featured artists and appearances on compilation albums not counted individually for each artist. The total number of weeks an artist spent in the top ten in 1956 is also shown.

Entries	Artist	Weeks	Albums
2	Bill Haley & His Comets	18	Rock Around the Clock, Rock 'n Roll Stage Show
2	Mel Tormé	7	Mel Tormé and the Marty Paich Dek-Tette, Gene Norman Presents Mel Torme At The Crescendo

== Notes ==
- ^{a} Songs for Swingin' Lovers re-entered the top 5 at number 4 on 6 October 1956 (week ending) for 2 weeks, at number 5 on 5 January 1957 (week ending) and at number 5 on 9 February 1957 (week ending).
- ^{b} Recordings credited to Original Soundtrack by the Official Charts Company but all had different artists as featured performers.
- ^{c} Rodgers and Hammerstein's Carousel re-entered the top 5 at number 2 on 13 October 1956 (week ending) for 5 weeks, at number 4 on 1 December 1956 (week ending) for 5 weeks, at number 4 on 12 January 1957 (week ending) for 3 weeks and at number 5 on 20 April 1957 (week ending). It also appeared in the expanded top 10 for one week at the end of 1959, and two further weeks in 1960, for a total of 28 weeks in the top 10 overall.
- ^{d} Rodgers and Hammerstein's Oklahoma! re-entered the top 5 at number 4 on 25 August 1956 (week ending), at number 4 on 15 September 1956 (week ending), at number 5 on 12 January 1957 (week ending) for 37 weeks, at number 5 on 23 November 1957 (week ending) and at number 5 on 14 December 1957 (week ending) for 10 weeks. It also returned to the top 5 for five weeks in 1958, appeared in the expanded top 10 for a further six weeks that year, another eleven weeks in 1959, fifteen weeks in 1960 and eight weeks in 1961. This gave it a total of 112 weeks in the top 10 overall.
- ^{e} Rock Around the Clock re-entered the top 5 at number 5 on 3 November 1956 (week ending), at number 5 on 22 December 1956 (week ending) and at number 4 on 2 February 1957 (week ending).
- ^{f} The King and I returned to the top 5 for four more weeks in 1958, appeared in the newly expanded top 10 for a further eight weeks that year, thirty weeks in 1959, thirteen weeks in 1960, three weeks in 1961 and a final single weeks in 1962. This gave it a total of 153 weeks in the top 10 overall.
- ^{g} Rock 'N' Roll Stage Shows re-entered the top 10 at number 3 on 8 December 1956 (week ending) for 2 weeks.

== See also ==
- 1956 in British music
- List of number-one albums from the 1950s (UK)
