= High Society (musical) =

Musical by Cole Porter and Arthur Kopit

- Original Recording
- Music: Cole Porter
- Lyrics: Cole Porter; Susan Birkenhead
- Book: Arthur Kopit
- Basis: The Philadelphia Story; High Society
- Premiere: September 4, 1997: American Conservatory Theater, San Francisco
- Productions: 1998 Broadway; 2005 West End; 2013 UK Tour; 2015 West End revival

High Society is a musical comedy with music and lyrics by Cole Porter, a book by Arthur Kopit and additional lyrics by Susan Birkenhead. The stage version adapts Porter's score for the 1956 film of the same name, which was based on the stage comedy The Philadelphia Story. The musical features much of the film's score, augmented by several songs selected from Porter's catalogue. The plot follows a pretentious Oyster Bay socialite who is planning to wed an equally pretentious executive, when her ex-husband arrives to disrupt the proceedings.

The musical premiered in San Francisco in late 1997, transferred to Broadway in early 1998, receiving mixed to unfavorable reviews, and closed after five months. Since then, it has been staged in the West End and elsewhere.

== Plot ==
=== Act I ===
Glamorous but pretentious Long Island socialite Tracy Samantha Lord is planning a lavish June 1938 wedding to an equally pretentious executive, George Kittredge. Guests include her mother, grumpy little sister Dinah, and absent-minded Uncle Willy, who lives in a house near the Lord estate. Willy is hosting a party for the wedding guests that evening, the night before the wedding. Tracy's unwelcome ex-husband and neighbor, C.K. Dexter Haven, sails up to the estate in his yacht. Dexter informs Tracy and her family that tabloid reporters Mike Connor and Liz Imbrie will be covering the wedding for Spy while pretending to be guests. Dexter invited them to stop Spy from publishing an exposé of Tracy's father Seth, who is estranged from Tracy's mother because he is having an affair with a dancer, Tina Mara. Dexter tries to convince the suspicious Dinah of his good intentions.

When Mike and Liz arrive, Tracy and Dinah do not let on that they know of the reporters' charade. Tracy pretends that Uncle Willie is her father, but when her father arrives, she pretends that he is Uncle Willie. Dexter confronts Tracy about their relationship, leaving her confused; suddenly George seems so pompous. She also is finding Mike to be sweet and remembers some good times with Dexter on his yacht. She starts drinking champagne before the party at Uncle Willie's even begins.

=== Act II ===
After the party, Tracy is still drinking champagne, and she misbehaves, dancing with the staff and Mike. George is angry and embarrassed. Dinah hurries to Dexter's house, finding him packing for a trip. She calls him a coward and informs him that Tracy is drinking champagne, which he knows makes her wild. After many farcical comings and goings back at the estate, George reminds Tracy of their wedding the next day, warns her about her behavior and stomps away. Mike tells Tracy that George is not good enough for her. He kisses her, and she tipsily invites him to go skinny dipping in the pool. Dexter and Dinah return to witness other romantic entanglements unfolding between Seth and his wife and Uncle Willy and Liz, who really loves Mike. As soon as Tracy gets in the water, the champagne catches up with her, and Mike puts her innocently in her bed.

In the morning, Tracy realizes that she was in the pool with Mike and, her memory hazy, fears that she had sex with him, ruining her wedding and social standing. All works out in the end, however, with Tracy's parents reuniting, the blackmail threat quashed, Mike realizing that he is really in love with Liz, and Tracy reuniting with Dexter. Since the wedding is already scheduled and paid for, Dexter steps up and all ends happily.

== Productions ==
=== Broadway ===
High Society premiered at the American Conservatory Theater of San Francisco in an out-of-town tryout on September 4, 1997 and ran through October 5, 1997. The musical began previews on Broadway on March 31, 1998, and officially opened on April 27, 1998, at the St. James Theatre. High Society closed on August 30, 1998, after 144 performances. The musical was directed by Christopher Renshaw and choreographed by Lar Lubovitch, with assistance from director Des McAnuff and choreographer Wayne Cilento. The cast included Melissa Errico (Tracy Samantha Lord), Daniel McDonald (C.K. Dexter Haven), John McMartin (Uncle Willie), Stephen Bogardus (Mike Conner), Randy Graff (Liz Imbrie), Lisa Banes (Margaret Lord), Marc Kudisch (George Kittredge), a 12-year-old Anna Kendrick (Dinah Lord; Theatre World Award), and Daniel Gerroll (Seth Lord). The original Broadway run was produced by Lauren Mitchell & Robert Gailus, Hal Luftig & Richard Samson, and Dodger Endemol Theatricals, in association with Bill Haber. Designers included Loy Arcenas (sets), Jane Greenwood (costumes) and Howell Binkley (lighting).

=== West End and Off West End ===
The West End production, directed by Ian Talbot with choreography by Gillian Gregory, premiered at the Regent's Park Open Air Theatre on July 24, 2003, and following a touring production, the musical was mounted with a new cast at London's Shaftesbury Theatre. It began previews on October 1, 2005, opened on October 10, 2005, and closed on January 21, 2006. The Shaftesbury cast included Katherine Kingsley (Tracy), Graham Bickley (Dexter), Ria Jones (Liz), Paul Robinson (Mike), John McMartin (Willie), Marc Kudisch (George), Claire Redcliffe (Dinah), Jerry Hall (Mother Lord), and James Jordan (Seth).

A revival opened in April 2015 at The Old Vic Theatre, directed by Maria Friedman, with Kate Fleetwood as Tracy Lord, Rupert Young as C.K. Dexter Haven, Jamie Parker as Mike Connor, Barbara Flynn as Margaret Lord, Anabel Scholey as Liz Imbrie, Jeff Rawle as Willie and Ellie Bamber as Dinah, and the production was played in the round. It closed in August 2015.

A production directed by Rachel Kavanaugh, starring Helen George as Tracy Lord, Julian Ovenden as C.K. Dexter Haven, Freddie Fox as Mike Connor and Felicity Kendal as Mother Lord, is scheduled to run for an eight-week season at the Barbican Theatre from May to July 2026, before touring the UK.

== Songs ==
Act I

- "High Society"^{†} – Household Staff
- "Ridin' High" – Tracy & Household Staff
- "Throwing a Ball Tonight" – Margaret, Tracy, Uncle Willie & Dinah
- "Little One"^{†} – Dexter & Dinah
- "Who Wants to Be a Millionaire?"^{†} – Liz & Mike
- "I Love Paris" – Dinah & Tracy
- "She's Got That Thing" – Uncle Willie, Dexter & Company
- "Once Upon a Time" – Tracy
- "True Love"^{†} – Dexter & Tracy

Act II

- "High Society" (reprise) – Household Staff
- "Let's Misbehave" – Tracy, Uncle Willie & Company
- "I'm Getting Myself Ready for You" – Uncle Willie & Liz
- "Once Upon a Time" (reprise) – Dexter
- "Just One of Those Things" – Dexter
- "Well, Did You Evah!"^{†} – Tracy, Uncle Willie, Liz & Household Staff
- "You're Sensational"^{†} – Mike
- "Say It With Gin" – Uncle Willie
- "Ridin' High" (reprise) – Margaret
- "It's All Right With Me" – Tracy
- "He's a Right Guy" – Liz
- "Samantha"^{†} – Dexter
- "Finale" – Tracy & Dexter

^{†}Song featured in the 1956 film

Some of the songs first appeared in earlier Cole Porter shows, including "Ridin' High" from Red, Hot and Blue, "Throwing a Ball Tonight" from Panama Hattie, "I Love Paris" and "It's All Right With Me" from Can-Can, "She's Got That Thing" from Fifty Million Frenchmen, "I'm Getting Myself Ready for You" and "Say It With Gin" from The New Yorkers, "Just One of Those Things" from Jubilee and "He's a Right Guy" from Something for the Boys.

== Reception ==
Ben Brantley, in his review for The New York Times, wrote:

Yes, spirits are definitely high in "High Society," which stars a sadly misused Melissa Errico, but they also feel forced and even desperate. The show, first seen in a tepidly received version in San Francisco, has since undergone drastic retailoring. And it ominously shed its director and choreographer of record, Christopher Renshaw and Lar Lubovitch, during New York rehearsals, with Des McAnuff and Wayne Cilento stepping in to make last-minute revisions.
Perhaps that accounts for the feverish, at-sea quality that seems to possess the show's team of talented, proven performers. The production's guiding rule appears to be to do whatever is necessary to land a joke or to sell a song. ... Numbers that should bubble with dry effervescence are more likely to come across as a thick ferment of suds.

Charles Isherwood in Variety said the show was a "polished, high-styled production" but was "light on romance, sparkle and personality" and overall felt "flat".

== Precursor stage musical ==
With a book and direction by Richard Eyre, an earlier stage adaptation of High Society premiered at the Leicester Haymarket Theatre from November 1986–January 1987, before transferring to London's West End, where it ran for 420 performances from 1987–1988 at the Victoria Palace Theatre. Employing the Porter songs from the film, the Eyre production starred Trevor Eve (Dexter), Stephen Rea (Mike), Angela Richards (Liz), Natasha Richardson (Tracy), and Ronald Fraser (Uncle Willie).

== Awards and nominations ==
=== Original Broadway production ===
Year	Award	Category	Nominee	Result
1998	Tony Award	Best Performance by a Featured Actor in a Musical	John McMartin	Nominated
1998	Tony Award	Best Performance by a Featured Actress in a Musical	Anna Kendrick	Nominated
1998	Drama Desk Award	Outstanding Musical		Nominated
1998	Drama Desk Award	Outstanding Actress in a Musical	Melissa Errico	Nominated
1998	Drama Desk Award	Outstanding Featured Actor in a Musical	John McMartin	Nominated
1998	Drama Desk Award	Outstanding Featured Actress in a Musical	Anna Kendrick	Nominated
1998	Theatre World Award		Anna Kendrick	Won

=== West End revival ===
Year	Award	Category	Nominee	Result
2004	Laurence Olivier Award	Best Musical Revival		Nominated
2004	Laurence Olivier Award	Best Performance in a Supporting Role in a Musical	Tracie Bennett	Nominated
