= Mind If I Make Love to You? =

Song by Cole Porter, included in the musical High Society

Single by Frank Sinatra

from the album High Society
- B-side: "Who Wants to Be a Millionaire?"
- Released: August 1956
- Genre: Big band, Beguine (dance)
- Length: 2:24
- Label: Capitol
- Songwriter: Cole Porter

Frank Sinatra singles chronology
"True Love" (1956)	"Mind If I Make Love to You?" (1956)	"Hey! Jealous Lover" (1957)

"Mind If I Make Love to You?" is a song written by Cole Porter for the 1956 film High Society, where it was sung by Frank Sinatra to Grace Kelly. It is the one song from the musical not included in any stage version of the show.

== Other recordings ==
- The song was covered by Harry Connick Jr on his 2019 album True Love: A Celebration of Cole Porter.
