= List of UK top-five albums in 1957 =

The UK Albums Chart is one of many music charts compiled by the Official Charts Company that calculates the best-selling albums of the week in the United Kingdom. Before 2004, the chart was only based on the sales of physical albums. This list shows albums that peaked in the Top 5 of the UK Albums Chart during 1957, as well as albums which peaked in 1956 but were in the top 5 in 1957. The entry date is when the album appeared in the top 5 for the first time (week ending, as published by the Official Charts Company, which is six days after the chart is announced).

Nineteen albums were in the top five this year. High Society credited to Various artists was released in 1956 but did not reach its peak until 1957. Three artists scored multiple entries in the top 5 in 1957 (excluding albums by Various artists). Nat King Cole and Tommy Steele were the artists who achieved their first UK charting top 5 album in 1957.

The 1956 Christmas number-one album, The King and I credited to Various artists, remained at number one for the first eight weeks of 1957. The first new number-one album of the year was High Society credited to Various artists. Six different albums peaked at number-one in 1957, with Frank Sinatra and albums credited to Various artists (2) having the most albums hit that position.

== Background ==
=== Multiple entries ===
Nineteen albums charted in the top 5 in 1957, with thirteen albums reaching their peak this year.

Three artists scored multiple entries in the top 5 in 1957. Frank Sinatra scored five top-ten albums, Elvis Presley entered the top 10 on four occasions and Billy Haley and the Comets secured two spots.

=== Chart debuts ===
Two artists achieved their first top 5 album in 1957 as a lead artist.

The following table (collapsed on desktop site) does not include does not include acts who had previously charted as part of a group and secured their first top 10 solo album, or featured appearances on compilations or other artists recordings.

Artist	Number of top 10s	First entry	Chart position	Other entries
Tommy Steele	1	Tommy Steele Stage Show	5	—
Nat King Cole	1	Love Is the Thing	1	—

=== Soundtrack albums ===
The cast recording from The Tommy Steele Story reached the top five in 1957, peaking at number one.

== Top-five albums ==
Key

Symbol	Meaning
‡	Album peaked in 1956 but still in chart in 1957.
(#)	Year-end top ten album position and rank
Entered	The date that the album first appeared in the chart.
Peak	Highest position that the song reached in the UK Albums Chart.

Entered (week ending)	Weeks in top 10	Single	Artist	Peak	Peak reached (week ending)	Weeks at peak
Albums in 1956
28 July 1956	13	Songs for Swingin' Lovers ‡ ^{[A]}	Frank Sinatra	1	28 July 1956	3
28 July 1956	25	Rodgers and Hammerstein's Carousel: Original Soundtrack ‡ ^{[B]}^{[C]}	Various artists	1	28 July 1956	6
28 July 1956	67	Rodgers and Hammerstein's Oklahoma!: Original Soundtrack ‡ ^{[C]}^{[D]}	Various artists	1	29 September 1956	3
4 August 1956	19	Rock Around the Clock ‡ ^{[E]}	Bill Haley & His Comets	2	22 September 1956	2
22 September 1956	94	The King and I: Original Soundtrack ‡ ^{[C]}	Various artists	1	13 October 1956	48
17 November 1956	22	Lonnie Donegan Showcase ‡	Lonnie Donegan	2	1 December 1956	7
22 December 1956	26	High Society: Original Soundtrack ^{[C]}	Various artists	1	16 February 1957	1
Albums in 1957
16 February 1957	13	This Is Sinatra!	Frank Sinatra	1	2 March 1957	4
16 February 1957	1	Rock the Joint	Bill Haley & His Comets	4	16 February 1957	1
27 April 1957	1	Tommy Steele Stage Show	Tommy Steele	5	27 April 1957	1
4 May 1957	3	Rock 'N' Roll No. 2 ^{[F]}	Elvis Presley	3	18 May 1957	1
18 May 1957	14	Love Is the Thing ^{[G]}	Nat King Cole	1	8 June 1957	1
25 May 1957	9	Close to You	Frank Sinatra	2	25 May 1957	1
8 June 1957	21	The Tommy Steele Story: Original Soundtrack ^{[C]}^{[H]}	Various artists	1	20 July 1957	4
20 July 1957	7	Frankie	Frank Sinatra	3	3 August 1957	2
31 August 1957	25	Loving You ^{[I]}	Elvis Presley	1	7 September 1957	3
7 September 1957	20	A Swingin' Affair! ^{[J]}	Frank Sinatra	1	21 September 1957	7
26 October 1957	7	The Best of Elvis	Elvis Presley	3	30 November 1957	1
30 November 1957	6	Elvis' Christmas Album	Elvis Presley	2	21 December 1957	2

== Entries by artist ==
The following table shows artists who achieved two or more top 5 entries in 1957, including albums that reached their peak in 1956. The figures only include main artists, with featured artists and appearances on compilation albums not counted individually for each artist. The total number of weeks an artist spent in the top ten in 1957 is also shown.

Entries	Artist	Weeks	Albums
5	Frank Sinatra ^{[K]}	47	A Swingin' Affair!, Close to You, Frankie, Songs for Swingin' Lovers, This Is Sinatra!
4	Elvis Presley	21	Elvis' Christmas Album, Loving You, Rock 'N' Roll No. 2, The Best of Elvis
2	Bill Haley & His Comets ^{[K]}	4	Rock Around the Clock, Rock the Joint

== Notes ==
- ^{a} Songs for Swingin' Lovers re-entered the top 5 at number 5 on 5 January 1957 (week ending) and at number 5 on 9 February 1957 (week ending).
- ^{b} Rodgers and Hammerstein's Carousel re-entered the top 5 at number 4 on 12 January 1957 (week ending) for 3 weeks and at number 5 on 20 April 1957 (week ending). It also appeared in the expanded top 10 for one week at the end of 1959, and two further weeks in 1960, for a total of 28 weeks in the top 10 overall.
- ^{c} Recordings credited to Original Soundtrack by the Official Charts Company but all had different artists as featured performers.
- ^{d} Rodgers and Hammerstein's Oklahoma! re-entered the top 5 at number 5 on 12 January 1957 (week ending) for 37 weeks, at number 5 on 23 November 1957 (week ending) and at number 5 on 14 December 1957 (week ending) for 10 weeks. It also returned to the top 5 for five weeks in 1958, appeared in the expanded top 10 for a further six weeks that year, another eleven weeks in 1959, fifteen weeks in 1960 and eight weeks in 1961. This gave it a total of 112 weeks in the top 10 overall.
- ^{e} Rock Around the Clock re-entered the top 5 at number 4 on 2 February 1957 (week ending).
- ^{f} Rock N' Roll No. 2 was re-issued by RCA Victor in 1962 and re-appeared in the expanded top 10 from 15 December 1962 (week ending) for fourteen weeks, including a second week at its peak of number 3 on 26 January 1963 (week ending). This gave it a total of 17 weeks in the top 10 overall.
- ^{g} Love Is the Thing re-entered the top 5 at number 5 on 27 July 1957 (week ending) for 5 weeks.
- ^{h} The Tommy Steele Story re-entered the top 5 at number 5 on 22 June 1957 (week ending) for 18 weeks and at number 5 on 9 November 1957 (week ending) for 2 weeks.
- ^{i} Loving You re-entered the top 5 at number 5 on 22 February 1958 (week ending).
- ^{j} A Swingin' Affair re-entered the top 5 at number 4 on 11 January 1958 (week ending) and at number 5 on 1 February 1958 (week ending) for 2 weeks.
- ^{k} Figure includes album that peaked in 1956.

== See also ==
- 1957 in British music
- List of number-one albums from the 1950s (UK)
