= Gamblin' Man =

1957 single by Lonnie Donegan

"Gamblin' Man" was a 1957 hit single for skiffle artist Lonnie Donegan. It was recorded live at the London Palladium and released as a double A side along with "Puttin' On the Style". It reached No. 1 in the UK Singles Chart in June and July 1957, where it spent two weeks in this position. This was the last UK number 1 to be released on 78 rpm format only, as 7-inch 45 rpm vinyl singles were becoming the norm by this time. The original Pye Nixa release does not exist on 7" format.

"Gamblin' Man" was written by Woody Guthrie, who recorded it during his 1944-45 Asch recordings period, when it was catalogued with an alternative title, "Roving Gambler". Donegan's recording was issued with the songwriting co-credit 'Guthrie - L. Donegan' and produced by Alan Freeman and Michael Barclay.

== See also ==
- List of UK Singles Chart number ones of the 1950s
