= The Skiffle Sessions – Live in Belfast 1998 =

The Skiffle Sessions – Live in Belfast

Live album by Van Morrison, Lonnie Donegan, and Chris Barber
- Released: 18 January 2000
- Recorded: 20–21 November 1998
- Venue: Whitla Hall, Belfast, Northern Ireland
- Genre: Skiffle
- Length: 46:25
- Label: Pointblank
- Producer: Van Morrison

Van Morrison, Lonnie Donegan, and Chris Barber chronology
Back on Top (1999)	The Skiffle Sessions – Live in Belfast (2000)	You Win Again (2000)

Singles from The Skiffle Sessions – Live in Belfast 1998
- 1. "I Wanna Go Home" b/w "New Burying Ground"/"Midnight Special" Released: January 2000

Professional ratings
Review scores
Source	Rating
AllMusic	4/5 stars

The Skiffle Sessions – Live in Belfast is a live album by Northern Irish singer-songwriter Van Morrison, with Lonnie Donegan and Chris Barber, released in 2000. Lonnie Donegan had played with the Chris Barber jazz band when he had his first hit with "Rock Island Line"/"John Henry" in 1955. He had been a childhood influence on Van Morrison, who had performed in his own skiffle band with schoolmates when he was twelve years old in Belfast, Northern Ireland. This was Donegan's second album in twenty years, reviving his career until his death in 2002.

== Recording history ==
Recorded on 20 and 21 November 1998 at Whitla Hall, Belfast, Northern Ireland. In 1977, Morrison had discussed recording an album of skiffle music with Dr. John, "because I started off in a skiffle group and there must be millions of other musicians who also began their careers playing that kind of music..." In preparation for this recording, he went to see Donegan perform and invited him to dinner and after a second meeting they arranged to record the sessions live. Dr. John, who was playing in concert in the city's Ulster Hall the same evening, arrived toward the end of the recording to play piano on the final few tracks.

== Track listing ==
All songs traditional except as indicated.

1. "It Takes a Worried Man" – 3:40
2. "Lost John" – 3:33
3. "Goin' Home" (Antonín Dvořák) – 3:08
4. "Good Morning Blues" (Lead Belly, John Lomax) – 2:52
5. "Outskirts of Town" (Andy Razaf, Fats Waller) – 4:20
6. "Don't You Rock Me Daddy-O" – 1:51
7. "Alabamy Bound" (Buddy DeSylva, Bud Green, Ray Henderson) – 2:22
8. "Midnight Special" – 2:53
9. "Dead or Alive" (Woody Guthrie) – 2:33
10. "Frankie and Johnny" – 4:31
11. "Goodnight Irene" (Lead Belly, Lomax) – 2:46
12. "Railroad Bill" – 1:57
13. "Muleskinner Blues" (Jimmie Rodgers, George Vaughn) – 3:06
14. "The Ballad of Jesse James" – 3:07
15. "I Wanna Go Home" – 3:46

== Personnel ==
- Van Morrison – vocal, acoustic guitar
- Lonnie Donegan – vocal, acoustic guitar
- Chris Barber – vocal, trombone, double bass
- Paul Henry, Big Jim Sullivan – acoustic guitar
- Nick Payne – harmonica, saxophone, background vocal
- Dr. John – piano
- Nicky Scott – electric bass
- Alan "Sticky" Wicket – washboard, percussion
- Chris Hunt - drums

== Charts ==
Chart performance for The Skiffle Sessions – Live in Belfast 1998
Chart (2000)	Peak position
Australian Albums (ARIA)	70
Dutch Albums (Album Top 100)	99
German Albums (Offizielle Top 100)	80
Irish Albums (IRMA)	13
New Zealand Albums (RMNZ)	14
Norwegian Albums (VG-lista)	33
Swedish Albums (Sverigetopplistan)	51
UK Albums (OCC)	14
