= You're Sensational =

Song
- Written: 1956
- Songwriter: Cole Porter

"You're Sensational" is a song written by Cole Porter for the 1956 film High Society, where it was introduced by Frank Sinatra.

== Notable recordings ==
- Frank Sinatra - High Society (1956)
- Bing Crosby recorded the song in 1956 for use on his radio show and it was subsequently included in the box set The Bing Crosby CBS Radio Recordings (1954-56) issued by Mosaic Records (catalog MD7-245) in 2009.
- Jack Jones - Dear Heart and Other Great Songs of Love (1964).
- Matt Monro - a single release in 1975 and included in the compilation CD The Complete Singles Collection (2010).
