= I Love You, Samantha =

"I Love You, Samantha" is a song written by Cole Porter for the 1956 film High Society, where it was introduced by Bing Crosby.

== Background ==
Sol C. Siegel, producer of the film High Society, paid Cole Porter $250,000 for his first original film score in eight years. Besides Louis Armstrong, the cast included Bing Crosby, Frank Sinatra, Grace Kelly, and Celeste Holm. Among the songs, Porter's favorite, which he considered musically superior to the others, was "I Love You, Samantha."

On the soundtrack album, there is an instrumental introduction (1 minute 41 seconds) before Crosby sings. In the film, this is replaced by Louis Armstrong playing introductory notes while Crosby is dressing. Then Crosby starts to sing as he continues to dress.

In the United Kingdom, an instrumental version of the song recorded by the Pete Moore Orchestra was used by broadcaster David Jacobs to introduce his BBC Radio 2 program The David Jacobs Collection, which aired from 1998 to 2013. Jacobs had previously used the orchestral section of the soundtrack recording to end his music programs, fading out just before the Bing Crosby vocal began.

== Notable recordings ==
- Bing Crosby - High Society (Recorded January 18, 1956)
- Kenny Ball - (as "Samantha" 1961 - No. 13 hit in the UK)
- Vince Hill - for his album Edelweiss (1967).
