= High Society (soundtrack) =

High Society: A New High Fidelity Recording From the Sound Track of the MGM Picture

Soundtrack album by Bing Crosby
- Released: 1956
- Recorded: January 1956
- Genre: Traditional pop
- Label: Capitol

Bing Crosby chronology
Bing Sings Whilst Bregman Swings (1956)	High Society: A New High Fidelity Recording From the Sound Track of the MGM Picture (1956)	Bing with a Beat (1957)

High Society is a 1956 soundtrack album, featuring Bing Crosby, Frank Sinatra, Louis Armstrong and Grace Kelly. This was Crosby's fifth LP album, and his first recorded for Capitol Records. It was the soundtrack for the MGM feature film High Society, also released in 1956. Initially issued on vinyl either in mono or stereo format, the album has been issued on CD by Capitol in Japan (CD: TOCP-6587) in 1991 and by Capitol in the UK (CD: CDP 793787-2) in 1995. The album was also included in a 3-CD box set called "Original Soundtrack Recordings" issued by the EMI Music Group Australasia

Crosby's exclusive recording contract with Decca Records expired at the end of 1955 and he chose to go freelance.

After his recording of "True Love" with Grace Kelly went gold, Crosby joked that it was the only gold record to feature a real-life princess. "True Love" was the only song in the album to be nominated for an Academy Award but it lost out to "Que Sera, Sera".

== Reception ==
The UK magazine The Gramophone liked the album saying: "...Lastly on Capitol LCT6116 El Bingo is heard along with nearly everybody else—Louis Armstrong, Grace Kelly and Frank Sinatra, for example—in the film "High Society". These numbers by Cole Porter are mostly available by the same artists on 45s, but whichever way you buy it do not neglect the wonderful 'Now You Has Jazz', in which Crosby introduces the band. It is an old gambit, but seldom fails, and certainly not here."

== Personnel in Louis Armstrong band ==
Louis Armstrong (tpt); Trummy Young (tbn); Edmond Hall (clt); Billy Kyle (pno); Arvell Shaw (bs); Barrett Deems (dms)

== Track listing ==
All songs written by Cole Porter.

Side one
No.	Title	Performer(s)	Length
1.	"High Society (Overture)"	Johnny Green, conducting the MGM Studio Orchestra	3:32
2.	"High Society Calypso"	Louis Armstrong and His Band	2:14
3.	"Little One"	Bing Crosby	2:33
4.	"Who Wants to Be a Millionaire?"	Celeste Holm, Frank Sinatra	2:08
5.	"True Love"	Bing Crosby, Grace Kelly	3:07

Side two
No.	Title	Performer(s)	Length
1.	"You're Sensational"	Frank Sinatra	3:56
2.	"I Love You, Samantha"	Bing Crosby	4:30
3.	"Now You Has Jazz"	Louis Armstrong and His Band, Bing Crosby	4:18
4.	"Well, Did You Evah!"	Bing Crosby, Frank Sinatra	3:50
5.	"Mind If I Make Love to You?"	Frank Sinatra	3:46

Note: the stereo version of "Well, Did You Evah!" does not include Crosby's adlib "You must be one of the newer fellas." Note 2: "Well, Did You Evah!", as b-side of "True Love", was edited to 2:52 on the 78 rpm-single.

== Chart positions ==
Chart	Year	Peak position
UK Albums Chart	1957	1
Billboard Best-Selling Pop Albums Chart	1956	5
Billboard Most Played by Jockeys Albums Chart	1956	1

== Credits ==
- Bing Crosby, Frank Sinatra, Celeste Holm, Grace Kelly - vocals
- Louis Armstrong - trumpet, vocals
- Louis Armstrong's Band:
  - Edmond Hall – clarinet
  - Trummy Young – trombone
  - Billy Kyle – piano
  - Arvell Shaw – double bass
  - Barrett Deems – drums
- Saul Chaplin - arranger, music supervisor
- Johnny Green - arranger, conductor, music supervisor
- Skip Martin, Nelson Riddle, Conrad Salinger - arranger
