= Puttin' On the Style =

Single by Vernon Dalhart

from the album Ballads And Railroad Songs
- B-side: "The Little Black Moustache"
- Released: March 1926
- Recorded: December 21, 1925
- Genre: Country
- Label: Victor Talking Machine Company
- Songwriter: Dawes-Hughes

Vernon Dalhart singles chronology
"Unknown Soldier's Grave" (1926)	"Puttin' On the Style" (1926)

Vernon Dalhart recorded "Puttin' On the Style" in December 1925, and by 1926, it was a popular hit. The song was collected in the Catskills by Norman Cazden from Ernie Sagar in 1945, showing that it had entered oral tradition. Another version has also been collected from oral tradition in West Virginia.

== Other versions ==
"Puttin' On the Style" was a 1957 hit for skiffle artist Lonnie Donegan. It was recorded live at the London Palladium and released as a double A-side along with "Gamblin' Man" and reached No. 1 in the UK Singles Chart in June and July 1957, where it spent two weeks in this position. It was Donegan's second consecutive No. 1 in the UK and the UK's first double-sided chart topper. It was the last UK chart-topper to be solely issued in 78 rpm format, as Pye Nixa did not release it on 7-inch single at the time (although it was later re-released as a 7"). This record was released in the US on August 19, 1957, as Mercury 71181, but did not chart.

A low-quality recording of the song performed by the Quarrymen, John Lennon's group live on 6 July 1957 exists, although it has never been released officially. It was recorded the same day that Lennon met his songwriting partner Paul McCartney, and is the earliest Beatles-related recording that exists. The song was also satirised by Peter Sellers on his song "Puttin' on the Smile" (1959), which he presented in the guise of folk singer, Lenny Goonagan.

The Chad Mitchell Trio also recorded this song on the "Mighty Day on Campus" album. Finnish singer Lasse Liemola had a hit in 1958 with a Finnish version of the song titled as "Diivaillen". In 1974 a group called Hullujussi covered "Diivaillen" in their album "Bulvania".

A version of it was performed on the television series western Men of Shiloh Episode 20, "Tate: Ramrod" by Rex Allen during a dance segment on the show. Lyrics pertaining to 20th century events and technology such as "the young man in the hot rod car" were omitted.

A version of the song is commonly sang by supporters of Scottish Premiership football club Celtic, commonly referred to as "Piling on the Agony".

== Charts ==
Lonnie Donegan's version of the song first entered the UK singles charts on June 13, 1957, starting at number 11, after which it moved to number 7, number 2, and eventually, by June 28, was at number 1., where it remained for two weeks, before being overtaken by Elvis Presley's "All Shook Up", after which the track spent 3 weeks at number two, before falling to number 4, and rising back to number 2, only to fall again to number 16 over the proceeding five weeks. In late September the song would rise to number 11, before falling to its final position of 27 in October 1957. When The Quarrymen covered the song, it was in its second week at number one.

Chart (1957)	Peak position
UK Charts	1
