= Lonnie Donegan Showcase =

Studio album by Lonnie Donegan with His Skiffle Group
- Released: November 1956
- Recorded: 22–23 August 1956
- Genres: Skiffle; blues; jazz; folk blues
- Length: 26:30
- Label: Pye Nixa

Lonnie Donegan with His Skiffle Group chronology
Lonnie Donegan Showcase (1956)	Lonnie (1957)

Lonnie Donegan Showcase (also known as Showcase) is the debut album by British musician Lonnie Donegan, credited to Lonnie Donegan with His Skiffle Group. Released by Pye Nixa in November 1956, the album followed a string of successful singles – including "Rock Island Line" – released by Donegan between 1955 and 1956 that established him as a solo artist, separate from the Chris Barber Jazz Band, and popularised his distinctive style of skiffle music, a genre that mixes folk, jazz and blues, in the United Kingdom.

Recorded over two days in August 1956, Showcase avoids including Donegan's hit singles in favour of eight new recordings of songs from Donegan's live repertoire, including country, folk and blues standards, and the use of a full band – including guitarist Denny Wright – lends the album a more driving sound than his earlier, washboard-augmented style. The record's anonymous sleeve notes, which avoid naming Donegan as a teen singer, contend that these performances changed critical perception of the singer. Ahead of the album's release, Donegan undertook variety tour that travelled throughout Britain in late 1956, and promoted the album on Jack Payne's BBC show Off the World.

On its initial release as a 10" LP, Lonnie Donegan Showcase sold a then-impressive amount for an album, totalling several hundred thousand copies, and spent seven non-consecutive weeks at number two on the UK albums chart, as well as topping several regional jazz charts. The sales were also strong enough for the album to enter the UK singles chart, typically reserved for 45 and 78 rpm singles, where it reached number 26, becoming the only album by a British act to do so. Showcase has since been cited as an early example of a British blues album and a major influence on later artists, particularly through its raw, DIY aesthetic. In 2025, Uncut ranked it at number 12 in their list of "The 500 Greatest Albums of the 1950s".

== Background and recording ==
Donegan began his career as a guitarist in The Ken Colyer Jazzmen, alongside Chris Barber and Ken Colyer. Between live sets, Donegan took the spotlight and developed the hybrid of jazz, blues and folk soon known as 'skiffle', named after the blues combo the Dan Burley Skiffle Group by Coyler's brother. Following Coyler's departure in 1954, the group became the Chris Barber Jazz Band and released the Dixieland album New Orleans Joy (1954) on Decca Records. During the sessions, Donegan persuaded their A&R manager into allowing him to record several skiffle songs, two of which – including the traditional folk song "Rock Island Line", notably recorded by Lead Belly – made the final record. Credited to the Lonnie Donegan Skiffle Group, "Rock Island Line" was released as a single in 1955; it peaked at number eight in the UK singles chart and also was a success in the United States, eventually selling over three million copies worldwide, 50 times as many copies as New Orleans Joy had sold. The success of the song launched both Donegan and the DIY-oriented skiffle music as cultural phenomena in Britain; author Bob Stanley writes that, "for teenage Britain, it was the most influential British record of the decade", inspiring young musicians that "they could make it into the radio by mastering a broomstick and a kazoo".

Donegan was widely popular throughout 1956, following his break-out hit with two more successful singles, "Stewball" (which reached number two) and "Bring a Little Water, Sylvie". Reflecting his popularity, he also regularly appeared on BBC radio shows, including Jack Payne's Record Show and Henry Hall's Guest Night. Keen to capitalise on Donegan's success, his label Pye Nixa booked the performer into a recording studio to record an album immediately after returning from a promotional trip to the United States. The label set aside two days for Donegan to record both the album and a re-recording of "Rock Island Line" for inclusion on an American LP. Lonnie Donegan Showcase, on which the singer is backed by his touring band who are credited with him as "Lonnie Donegan with His Skiffle Group", was predominately taped on 22 August 1956. The sleeve notes state that "Nobody's Child" and "I Shall Not Be Moved" were recorded a day later, although both "Wabash Cannonball" and "Nobody's Child" had been recorded in September 1954 with Barber on upright bass and washboard player Beryl Bryden. Despite being known as the "King of Skiffle", Donegan would avoid using the washboard again, with the new recordings on the album "[benefitting] from the driving rhythm of a full band", according to musician and author Billy Bragg.

== Composition ==
=== Musical style ===
As was the standard at the time, Lonnie Donegan Showcase does not feature any of Donegan's hit singles. Instead, the musician delved into his growing live repertoire for a selection of songs that demonstrated his appreciation for country music. Examples include the Carter Family's "freewheeling" train song "Wabash Cannonball", as made famous by Hank Williams, and two Hank Snow songs – "Nobody's Child" and a further train song, "Wreck of the Old '97" – that author Patrick Humphries believes Donegan discovered while stationed on national service in Vienna. According to Bragg, the decision to only feature eight new recordings and eschew Donegan's three top ten hits ensured that Showcase "wasn't some thrown-together, here's-all-the-hits, cash-in-for-Christmas release." Music critic Bruce Eder comments that the album contains songs Donegan had been playing for almost ten years, including "Frankie and Johnny", alongside further folk and blues standards, including material he discovered through Lead Belly records including "I'm Alabammy Bound". The record's raw, crisp sound is defined by Donegan's bluesy vocals and vehement strumming, backed by Denny Wright's lead guitar licks, although both musicians share vocals on "I'm Alabammy Bound", with Wright's baritone meshing with Donegan's tenor.

=== Songs ===
[In 1956,] this five-minute tale of love, death, revenge and retribution would itself have sounded novel to record buyers, reared on briefer, happier tales of true love conquering all. But Donegan obviously relishes Nellie lifting her kimono and her descent into hell, joyously concluding that 'this story ain't had no moral.' It was a glimpse into life's other side, both rare and beguiling in the reticent mid-50s."

— Donegan biographer Patrick Humphries (2012) on "Frankie and Johnny"

"Wabash Cannonball" opens the album and, similarly to "Rock Island Line", is a runaway train song that, according to critic Nick Hasted, "suggests a hysterical take on Chuck Berry." "How Long, How Long Blues" is a Leroy Carr song. Donegan believed that the mawkish "Nobody's Child", about an orphaned child rejected for his blindness, was comparable to Hank Williams' alter ego Luke the Drifter: "The narrations that he did [...] are full of frank and honest truths. I find that people in the North of England are much more emotional. I can bring people in Liverpool to tears with 'Nobody's Child', but I couldn't do that in London, where they are much more cynical." A gospel song, "I Shall Not Be Moved" derives its chaotic energy from Donegan's "speed-freak" vocals. Charlie Patton's 1929 recording may have inspired Donegan's interpretation, although Bragg opines that its "overenthusiastic use of a tambourine make his version sound like a singalong at the local Salvation Army hostel."

"I'm Alabammy Bound" is a roots song that Donegan discovered through Lead Belly, followed by a morose rendition of the blues standard "I'm a Ramblin' Man" which spotlights guitar interplay between the two guitarists. "Wreck of the Old '97", a classic railroad song often interpreted by bluegrass groups of the era, may have been discovered by Donegan when stationed in Vienna, tuning into the American Forces Network. It concerns the titular wreck of the Old 97 of 27 September 1903 in which the Fast Mail (train number 97) service crashed in Monroe, Virginia, killing nine people.

The American murder ballad "Frankie and Johnny" is described by Hasted as the album's "epic climax", who writes that its "resonant drums and bass combine with Donegan's acoustic guitar drone in an ominous introduction eerily predictive of future psychedelia." The song has been seen as uncompromising for Donegan's teen audience, with stark lyrics at the climax describing Frankie's shooting of her unfaithful lover, punctuated by howls and groans. Radio DJ John Peel, a teenager when he first heard it, called it "one of the most astonishing performances in all recorded music." Elaborating, Peel commented: "There are times in 'Frankie and Johnny' when he [Donegan] almost sounds Eastern, a strange, high-pitched wailing. Nobody else has ever done that – well I've never heard anybody do that." The guitarist Mark Knopfler, also a fan of Donegan at the time, said that Donegan took a solemn song and "really [turned] up the heat on it."

== Sleeve notes ==
The packaging of Lonnie Donegan Showcase features anonymous sleeve notes, documenting how Donegan was "mainly an affair of staggering figures and cold, hard cash" until his British variety tour began in September 1956, which "confounded the critics and proved that the record-buying public had not been hoodwinked by any overnight shooting star." The notes further declare that, rather than depending on recording engineer "wizardry", Donegan and His Skiffle Group could rely on their impressive act to draw audiences.

Describing the sleeve notes as the best example of "the industry attitude to skiffle as a new form of entertainment", Simon Frith considers them notable for three reasons: "the confusion of music labels (variety, skiffle, music hall, jazz – Donegan is described as 'the first out-and-out jazz singer ever to hit the best-seller lists'); the implicit suggestion that music on record is somehow 'artificial' (and its consumers 'hoodwinked'); and the lack of any reference to the teenage market", the latter foreshadowing Donegan's subsequent career as a variety act. Mats Grief comments how the liner notes already identify Donegan as a variety star, writing that he was "not originally feted as a teenage idol", while Alan Sinfield observes that the notes "display a typical anxiety about art and commercial success", citing the line: "Many a case-hardened critic automatically wrote off any artistic merit in performances which netted such huge disc sales and so high a rating on the best-sellers list."

== Release and reception ==
=== Promotion and commercial response ===
Donegan toured throughout the British autumn of 1956; initially hosting a short trial residency at Blackpool Palace, he made his first London showing at the Stoll Theatre, performing hits as well as songs from the then-upcoming Lonnie Donegan Showcase. He then performed – as was common practice in the era – a week each at 14 theatres throughout the country, such that he was within reach of much of the British population. According to writer Pete Frame, the extensive touring allowed Donegan to perfect his 35-minute set, "and audiences, reticent at first, were soon singing and clapping along." The release of Showcase was preceded by two weeks split between London's Prince of Wales Theatre and Finsbury Park Empire. On 24 December, Donegan promoted Showcase with a live performance on Jack Payne's BBC programme Off the World, which was viewed by six-and-a-half million households. "He was a beaming showman," Frame writes, "a natural for the national variety circuit, the main stream of live entertainment. Into it headlong he was pushed, showing no sign of fear or hesitancy. This is what he was born to do."

Lonnie Donegan Showcase was released as a 10" LP in November 1956 by Pye Nixa, sporting their 'plum' label design. Issued in time for the Christmas market, it sold 60,000 copies, an impressive amount for an LP at the time. Pye Nixa, who were quoted as saying it was "selling like mad", struggled to press copies quickly enough to meet demand. The sales were strong enough for the album to enter the UK singles chart, typically reserved for 45 and 78 rpm singles. It was only the second long-playing record, after Frank Sinatra's Songs for Swingin' Lovers! (also 1956), to breach the chart, as well as being Donegan's fifth entry that year, the others being three singles and the Skiffle Session EP in July. Showcase eventually peaked at number 26 in January 1957, and remains the only album by a British artist to enter the singles chart. On the UK albums chart, established in July 1956, Lonnie Donegan Showcase peaked at number two for seven non-consecutive weeks in 1956 and 1957 behind The King and I soundtrack; overall, it spent 22 weeks in the top five, leaving the listings in April 1957. The album also topped the regional jazz charts in Manchester, Birmingham and the Midlands, which author Roberta Freund Schwartz highlights as evidence of skiffle finding equal popularity throughout Britain as it was enjoying in London. According to Eder, the album has sold several hundred thousand copies.

=== Critical reception ===
Reviewing Lonnie Donegan Showcase for the Daily Herald, Max Jones noted how Donegan "sings and wails" on his debut LP which is "already selling fast", deeming it good value for "skifflers". Less favourably, The Gramophone's Arthur Jackson remarked that he disliked "ridiculous home-grown skiffle music" as much as rock & roll, panning what he described as "Donegan's nasal voice, corny phrasing, ridiculous stodgy accent and the monotonous stodgy rhythm." According to Humphries, Jackson's review was "an object lesson in the journalistic objectivity of the time." In Australia, The Sun-Herald's Downbeat journalists opined that while Donegan was the originator of modern skiffle, he "degenerates the art to no more than a hillbilly wail" on Showcase, adding: "This is one case where there is too much Donegan showing." Under a review named "Jazz, Old Style and Modern", The Age's critic deemed skiffle to be an offshoot of jazz and reviewed it alongside reissues of 1920s jazz by Johnny Dodds and Kid Ory, deeming them all to "provide interesting long-players". Of Lonnie Donegan Showcase, the writer opined that Donegan's skiffle band "provides eight rhythmic instrumental and vocal titles with a captivating, driving beat", and added: "It is a very mild form of rock 'n' roll, with more scope for musicianship."

In the 1956 NME readers poll, whose results were published that December, Donegan came second to Dickie Valentine in the "Outstanding Musical Personality" category, and ranked fifth in the "Small Band" section, a result which shocked Donegan's "old mates in the jazz world", according to Frame. Donegan said of his success: "I haven't gone commercial, it's just that my act has gone commercial."

=== Re-releases ===
In July 1957, Quality Records released An Englishman Sings American Folk Songs in Canada, containing all eight songs from Lonnie Donegan Showcase alongside three additional cuts – "Don't You Rock Me Daddy-O", "Railroad Bill" and "Old Bailey". Lonnie Donegan Showcase was re-released in September 1968 by Marble Arch Records, a subsidiary of Pye, alongside eighteen other albums as part of a range intended to cater to all tastes. All of the album's recordings were later compiled on the eight-disc box set More Than 'Pye in the Sky' (1993). In 2017, the label Hoo Doo re-released Showcase alongside Donegan's second album, Lonnie (1957), as a one-disc set. Individual CD releases of Showcase were issued by Sanctuary in 2006, Pickwick and Hallmark in 2007 and Doxy in 2011.

== Legacy ==
=== Critical reappraisal ===
Professional ratings
Review scores
Source	Rating
AllMusic	4/5 stars
The Encyclopedia of Popular Music	3/5 stars
Record Collector	3/5 stars

Reviewing the 1968 Marble Arch reissue of Lonnie Donegan Showcase, Lancashire Evening Telegraph critic Mike Newsome deemed it "pure nostalgia for those who remember with affection the age of skiffle", adding: "It sounds a bit dated now, but there is still an occasional glimpse of the magic which put Donegan in the best sellers lists." Evening Chronicle music writer Douglas Enefer recommended the Marble Arch reissue to audiences who wished to hear the "early hits" of the "zestful" entertainer.

More recently, AllMusic's Bruce Eder praises Showcase for being "absolutely first-rate acoustic folk-blues" and named it "[the] first great blues album to come out of England". Eder believed that Donegan's blues vocals were superior to those of his contemporaries, such as Cyril Davies and Alexis Korner, and commented that "he knew how to make the tension in a song rise across five minutes like no one else around." Hi-Fi World deems it "a breakthrough blues album – the first significant blues album by an Englishman", adding that it exemplifies why Donegan was "a revolutionary artist." In 2025, the editors of Uncut magazine ranked Showcase at number 12 in their list of "The 500 Greatest Albums of the 1950s". In the accompanying write-up, Uncut contributor Nick Hasted dubs it the "nasal sound of UK grassroots music" and opines that it is Donegan's "unhinged vocal which still sends shockwaves down the years". Reviewing the 2017 re-release of Showcase and Lonnie for Record Collector, Bob Solly credited Donegan for largely inspiring the 1950s folk-jazz trend that "gave young musicians the confidence to form small groups using the most basic of acoustic instruments", but added that "no one could compete with Donegan". Darren Jamison of Singersroom included it on the website's list of the best albums of 1956, deeming it "a must-listen for fans of skiffle and British rock and roll" with its blend of folk, blues and jazz.

=== Influence ===
Donegan's skiffle style, mixing jazz, blues and folk and incorporating homemade instruments, was widely influential on a generation of British musicians, including on the Beatles, with Showcase securing his legacy as "one of the most influential musicians of the 1950s", according to Jamison. Terry Staunton of Record Collector comments that blues has been pivotal in the development of British popular music since Donegan adapted Lead Belly's "folkier idioms" and "adapted them for a mainstream audience in the mid-50s", foreshadowing the work of the Rolling Stones, the Yardbirds and Manfred Mann a decade later. According to Hasted, the album's emphasis on "rawness and DIY spirit" was radical, foreshadowing punk rock two decades in advance.

In his autobiography Margrave of the Marshes (2005), John Peel described Lonnie Donegan Showcase as one of several "astonishing" Donegan releases of the period on Pye Nixa, "and that rare thing, an LP that made the singles chart". Peel considered Donegan's "searing" cover of "Frankie and Johnny" to be the performer's peak, adding that the Black Keys and the White Stripes are fans of the track, with Jack White of the latter act inspired enough to credit Donegan for "[starting] it for you" when accepting a BRIT Award. Appearing on Peel's Night Ride show on BBC Radio 1 and 2 in 1968, John Lennon said that "Wabash Cannonabll" conjured "tender memories", especially of his "first Lonnie guaranteed-not-to-split guitar, which smashed in half". Van Morrison has recalled: "Other records started and ended in the same place. At the end [of Donegan's], you felt you'd arrived at somewhere different." In the 1970s, Wilko Johnson was inspired by the album to join a jug band, presaging his later band Dr. Feelgood's "template for punk." Similarly drawing comparison with punk, Bragg describes Donegan's "near-hysterical" singing at the end of "Frankie and Johnny" as "exhibiting the loss of vocal control that would later become the hallmark of Joe Strummer's performances with the Clash."

Lonnie Donegan Showcase was also an early influence on Dire Straits, whereas Little Free Rock guitarist Peter Illingworth credits the album as an influence on his work with the band, recalling having "had a great time" attempting to learn the album's songs. Traveling Wilburys, a skiffle revival band fronted by Donegan fan George Harrison, achieved a modest hit with their version of "Nobody's Child" in 1990. Donegan's version of "I'm Alabammy Bound" has been praised by musical theatre lyricist Tim Rice, who was also a contemporary fan of the singer. In an audiophile event co-hosted by Classic Album Sundays and presented by Lonnie's son Peter Donegan, a copy of Lonnie Donegan Showcase was played in full before an audience at London's Royal Festival Hall during the 2011 Vintage festival, the first in a series of playbacks of classic British albums from the 1950s–1980s.

== Track listing ==
All songs traditional with new words and music written by Lonnie Donegan, except where noted

=== Side one ===
1. "Wabash Cannonball" (A. P. Carter) – 1:58
2. "How Long, How Long Blues" (Leroy Carr) – 2:35
3. "Nobody's Child" (Cy Coben) – 4:55
4. "I Shall Not Be Moved" – 2:26

=== Side two ===
5. "I'm Alabammy Bound" – 1:50
6. "I'm a Ramblin' Man" – 4:55
7. "Wreck of the Old '97" (Charles Noell, Fred Lewey, Henry Clay Work, Henry Whitter) – 2:29
8. "Frankie and Johnny" – 5:22

== Personnel ==
Adapted from the liner notes of Lonnie Donegan Showcase

Lonnie Donegan with His Skiffle Group

- Lonnie Donegan – performer
- Denny Wright – guitar
- Micky Ashman – bass
- Nick Nicholls – drums

Other

- Ian Bradbery – sleeve design
- Ron Cohen – sleeve photography
- Joe Meek – recording balance
- Eric Tomlinson – recording balance
- Denis Preston – recording supervision
