= Classic Album Sundays =

Classic Album Sundays hosts album listening events in which classic albums are played in their entirety on vinyl. It was founded in 2010 by radio host and DJ Colleen 'Cosmo' Murphy because she felt that albums were not getting the attention they deserved. The inaugural event took place in the Hanbury Arms in Islington, London. It has since spread across the world, hosting events worldwide in the US, Europe, Japan and Australia.

== Featured artists ==
Classic Album Sundays has worked with a diverse array of musicians, producers and DJs including Pink Floyd’s Nick Mason, Nitin Sawhney, Jarvis Cocker, Laura Mvula, Roni Size, Badly Drawn Boy, Sister Sledge, Tony Visconti, Anthrax, Lisa Stansfield, The Zombies, Billy Bragg, DJ Yoda and many more.

Events have also been held at a range of diverse locations such as The British Library and The V&A Museum, as well as festivals including EFG London Jazz Festival, Edinburgh International Festival and Bestival. In 2012, Nile Rodgers attended Classic Album Sundays at Camp Bestival to discuss working with David Bowie on Let’s Dance.

Since its inception in 2018, National Album Day has hosted events in partnership with Classic Album Sundays featuring guests such as Jazzie B, Paloma Faith, Thurston Moore, Orbital and Primal Scream.

== Website ==
The Classic Album Sundays website is an extension of the live events and tells the stories behind classic albums, featuring filmed interviews with guest artists, podcasts, playlists and hi-fi features.

With events cancelled for the foreseeable future, Classic Album Sundays has moved all activity and events online and are now offering a subscription service for three online events – The Album Club, The Classic Album Pub Quiz and the Safe and Sound webinar.

== Other projects ==
In September 2019, the first Classic Album Sundays book was released. Written by Colleen Murphy, it was inspired by a social media campaign Classic Album Sundays ran for International Woman’s Day in 2018, asking friends in the music world to nominate their favourite album by a female musician.

The book, entitled Classic Albums by Women, features the 100+ best albums by women as chosen by musicians, DJs, producers, journalists, radio hosts and music industry insiders, including Nina Kraviz, The Blessed Madonna, Peter Hook, KT Tunstall and the Daily Telegraph music critic, Neil McCormick.
