= High Society (1956 film) =

1956 film by Charles Walters

- Theatrical release poster
- Directed by: Charles Walters
- Screenplay by: John Patrick
- Based on: The Philadelphia Story; 1939 play by Philip Barry
- Produced by: Sol C. Siegel
- Starring: Bing Crosby; Grace Kelly; Frank Sinatra; Celeste Holm; John Lund; Louis Calhern; Sidney Blackmer; Louis Armstrong
- Cinematography: Paul C. Vogel
- Edited by: Ralph E. Winters
- Music by: Cole Porter
- Production companies: Sol C. Siegel Productions; Bing Crosby Productions
- Distributed by: Metro-Goldwyn-Mayer
- Release date: July 17, 1956
- Running time: 111 minutes
- Country: United States
- Language: English
- Budget: $2.8 million
- Box office: $8.2 million (rentals)

High Society is a 1956 American musical romantic comedy film directed by Charles Walters and starring Bing Crosby, Grace Kelly, and Frank Sinatra. The film was produced by Sol C. Siegel for Metro-Goldwyn-Mayer, and shot in VistaVision and Technicolor, with music and lyrics by Cole Porter.

The film is a musical remake of the 1940 screwball comedy film The Philadelphia Story, which was based on the 1939 play The Philadelphia Story by Philip Barry. High Society's screenplay was written by John Patrick and involves a successful popular jazz musician (Crosby) trying to win back the affections of his ex-wife (Kelly), who is preparing to marry another man. The cast also features Celeste Holm, John Lund, and Louis Calhern, in his final film, with a musical contribution by Louis Armstrong. The film was Kelly's last professional appearance before she married Prince Rainier III and became Princess consort of Monaco.

In 2025, High Society was selected for preservation in the National Film Registry by the Library of Congress as "culturally, historically or aesthetically significant".

== Plot ==
Successful singer-composer C.K. Dexter Haven is divorced from wealthy Newport, Rhode Island, socialite Tracy Samantha Lord. Dexter, who lives next door to the Lord estate, remains in love with her but she is now engaged to socially prominent and snobbish George Kittredge. As Tracy prepares for her upcoming wedding, Dexter is busily organizing elements of the Newport Jazz Festival.

Meanwhile, Spy, a tabloid newspaper, possesses embarrassing info about Tracy's errant father, Seth Lord, and has coerced the family into allowing reporter Mike Connor and photographer Liz Imbrie to cover the nuptials. Tracy, resenting their forced presence, begins an elaborate charade, including introducing her Uncle Willy as her father, while Seth is passed off as "wicked" Uncle Willy.

As a wedding gift, Dexter gives Tracy a scale model of their former sailboat, "True Love", which evokes her memories about their happy honeymoon aboard it. Tracy gradually realizes George knows little about her true self and has instead created an idealized image of her. When Tracy drives Mike around Newport, he notices some neglected mansions; Tracy explains many owners have been forced to board up or sell off their properties due to high taxes. Her Uncle Willy is selling his own estate. The two form a mutual attraction, leaving Tracy to choose from three very different men during a course of self-discovery.

During the wedding-eve party at Uncle Willy's house, George catches a tipsy Tracy kissing Dexter on the patio. George leaves Tracy in an empty room to sober up but, still tipsy, she climbs out the window and runs into Mike. George finds her again after she and Mike have had a swim in the Lords' pool. The next day, Tracy has hazy memories of the previous night. She initially intends to go through with the wedding, then prods George into agreeing to call it off. While informing the waiting guests the wedding is canceled, Dexter suddenly proposes that he be the groom. Knowing she loves him, Tracy accepts. Liz and Mike, who now realize they love each other, tell Tracy and Dexter that they are not writing a story about the wedding or other events to protect the family's privacy.

== Cast ==
- Bing Crosby as C. K. Dexter Haven
- Grace Kelly as Tracy Samantha Lord
- Frank Sinatra as Macaulay "Mike" Connor
- Celeste Holm as Elizabeth "Liz" Imbrie
- John Lund as George Kittredge
- Louis Calhern as Uncle Willie
- Sidney Blackmer as Seth Lord
- Louis Armstrong and His Band as themselves
  - Edmond Hall – clarinetist
  - Trummy Young – trombonist
  - Billy Kyle – pianist
  - Arvell Shaw – bassist
  - Barrett Deems – drummer
- Margalo Gillmore as Margaret Lord
- Lydia Reed as Caroline Lord
- Gordon Richards as Dexter Haven's butler
- Richard Garrick as Lords' butler
- Philo McCullough as party guest (uncredited)

== Production ==
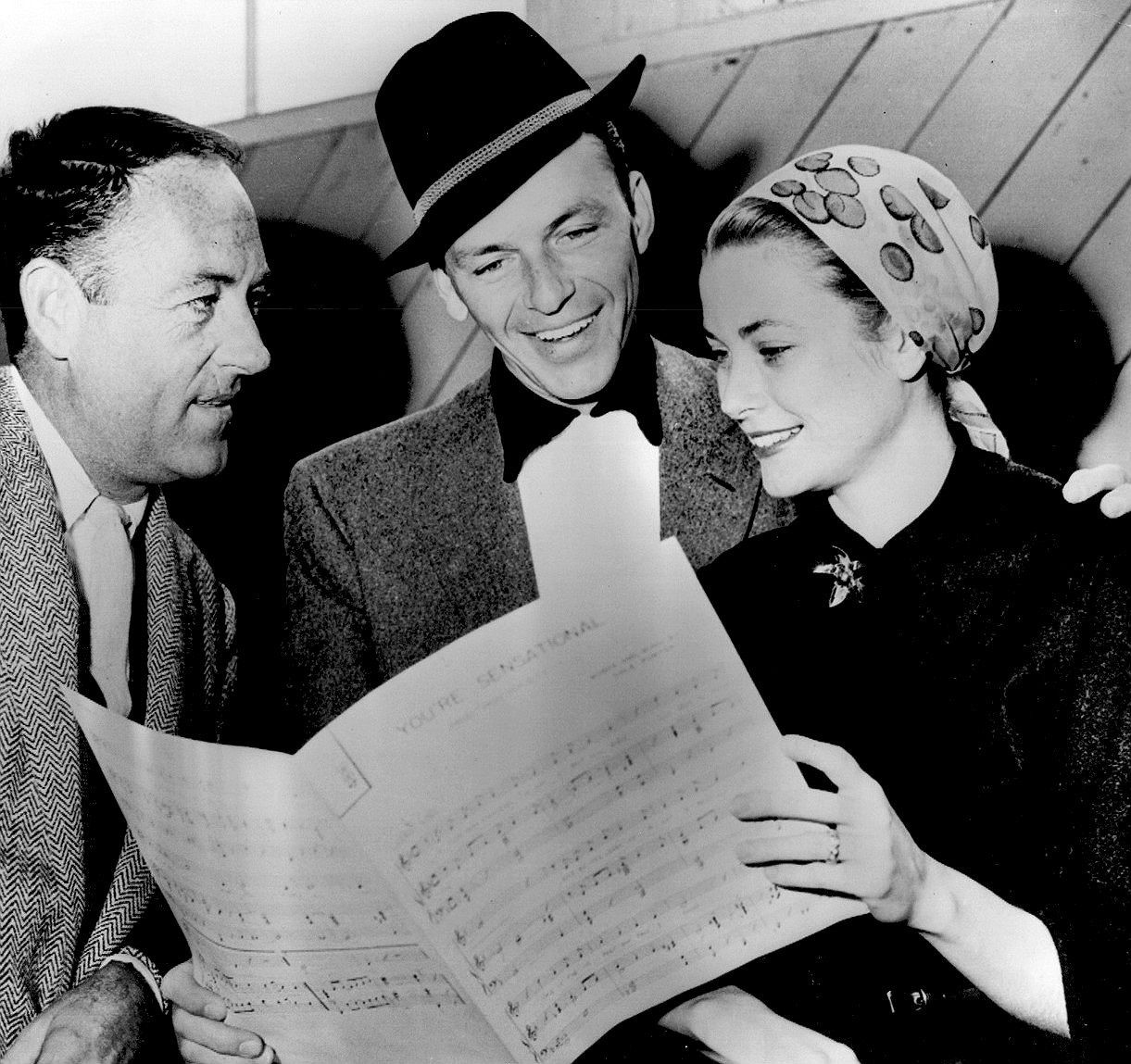
L–R: Director Charles Walters, Frank Sinatra, and Grace Kelly

Filming took place between January and March 1956. The location scenes were mostly shot in and around Clarendon Court in Newport, Rhode Island, which was then owned by Mae Cadwell Hayward, and later purchased in 1970 by Claus von Bülow.

The location, according to Turner Classic Movies (TCM), enabled them to take advantage of the Newport Jazz Festival, established in 1954, incorporating it into the film by giving Crosby's character a background as a descendant of a Gilded Age robber baron who became a jazz composer and friend of jazz star Louis Armstrong, who plays himself in the film, and patron of the Festival. As name-checked by Crosby in the song "Now You Has Jazz", where each musician takes a small solo, Armstrong's band members were Edmond Hall (clarinet), Trummy Young (trombone), Billy Kyle (piano), Arvell Shaw (bass), and Barrett Deems (drums).

This film featured Kelly's final role before she became Princess of Monaco; it was released three months after her marriage to Prince Rainier III. In the film, Kelly wore the Cartier engagement ring given to her by Rainier. Sinatra was 40 and Crosby 53 while playing the love interests of Kelly, who was 26 at the time of the filming. Sinatra biographers George Jacobs and William Stadiem claimed that Crosby kept his distance from Sinatra during the production and remained strictly professional when Sinatra desired companionship, and that it "killed" Sinatra to think Crosby considered himself a higher class singer. The biographers claim that Sinatra was fascinated with Grace Kelly – as were many of her previous co-stars – and would have loved to have an affair with her but feared rejection and embarrassment in front of Crosby, who had previously had an affair with Kelly. However, counteracting allegations, TCM states that "in spite of a rumored rivalry between Frank Sinatra and Bing Crosby, the two worked together very amicably throughout the shoot."

The sailboat used in the film, the "True Love" (originally the "Venona II", based on the Malabar design by John Alden built for racing), sails on Seneca Lake out of Watkins Glen, NY, as an excursion boat for Seneca Sailing Adventures, LLC.

== Musical numbers ==
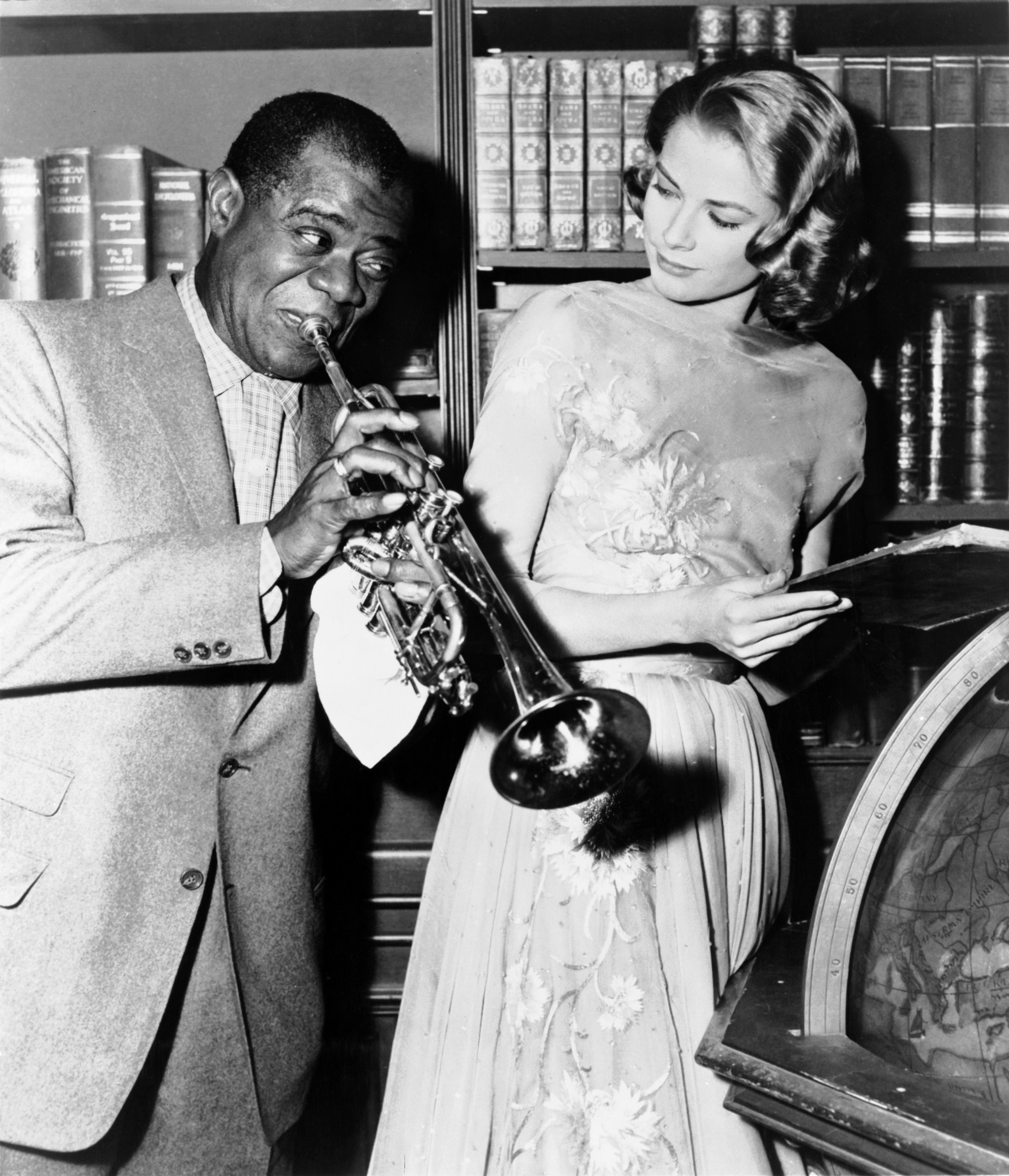
Louis Armstrong and Kelly on the set of High Society, from the New York World-Telegram

Producer Sol C. Siegel paid Porter $250,000 for his first original film score in eight years; it introduced a couple of pop standards, including "True Love" and "You're Sensational". Not only did Sinatra and Crosby collaborate for the first time, but behind the scenes two master orchestrators – Conrad Salinger and Nelson Riddle – melded their arrangements under the baton of Johnny Green. Armstrong and his band get a couple of standout moments and Kelly has her only role in a musical.

1. "Overture"
2. "High Society Calypso" – Louis Armstrong and his band
3. "Little One" – C.K. (Bing Crosby)
4. "Who Wants to Be a Millionaire?" – Mike (Frank Sinatra), Liz (Celeste Holm)
5. "True Love" – C.K. (Crosby), Tracy (Grace Kelly)
6. "You're Sensational" – Mike (Sinatra)
7. "I Love You, Samantha" – C.K. (Crosby)
8. "Now You Has Jazz" – C.K. (Crosby), Armstrong and his band, individually introduced by name
9. "Well, Did You Evah!" – C.K. (Crosby), Mike (Sinatra)
10. "Mind if I Make Love to You?" – Mike (Sinatra)

A soundtrack album was released the year of the film's release and was a major success in both America and the United Kingdom. It has been said that one of the main reasons star Sinatra was drawn to the film was a mock-tipsy duet with his boyhood idol Crosby on "Well, Did You Evah!", a song from an earlier Porter show, DuBarry Was a Lady (1939), re-adapted and added at the last minute when it was noted that the two singers did not have a duet to perform in the film.

The title of the song "Who Wants to Be a Millionaire?" gained new significance a half-century later as the title of a global game show franchise. "I Love You, Samantha" has also become a jazz favorite for improvisations.

== Reception ==
Opening on July 17, 1956, High Society garnered mixed reviews, often being compared as a lesser offering to The Philadelphia Story, a previous adaptation in 1940 of the same play starring Cary Grant in the Crosby part, Katharine Hepburn in the Kelly role, and James Stewart in an Oscar-winning turn as the reporter played in the remake by Sinatra. Abel Green of Variety observed: "High Society should spell high finance business all over. It's a solid entertainment every minute of its footage. Fortified with a strong Cole Porter score, film is a pleasant romp for cast toppers Bing Crosby, Grace Kelly and Frank Sinatra who, tactfully, get alphabetical top billing. Their impact is almost equally consistent. Although Sinatra has the top pop tune opportunities, the Groaner makes his specialties stand up and out on showmanship and delivery, and Miss Kelly impresses as a femme lead with pleasantly comedienne overtones. This is perhaps her most relaxed performance."

Trailer for the film

Bosley Crowther of The New York Times described it as "flimsy as a gossip-columnist's word", missing "the snap and the crackle that its un-musical predecessor had." The movie premiered at the Radio City Music Hall. According to Time, in spite of its "Who's Who cast" the film is "simply not top-drawer"; a "good deal of the screenplay seems as dated today as the idle rich ... [Kelly] lacks the gawky animal energy that Katharine Hepburn brought to the 1939 play and the 1941 movie, [Crosby] saunters through the part rather sleepily, without much of the old Bing zing [, and] Sinatra plays the reporter like a dead-end kid with a typewriter."

At the box-office, High Society was a success. It was one of the 10 highest-grossing films of 1956 in the US and Canada earning theatrical rentals of $5,602,000, and $2,656,000 elsewhere for a worldwide total of $8,258,000, resulting in a profit of $1,148,000.

On the review aggregator website Rotten Tomatoes, 88% of 25 critics' reviews are positive, with an average rating of 7.5/10.

== Awards and nominations ==
High Society received two Academy Award nominations, and nearly received a third. The film was initially nominated in the 1956 Academy Awards for Best Motion Picture Story, even though it was based on the 1940 film The Philadelphia Story and thus was not eligible in that category. Moreover, the nominated writers, Elwood Ullman and Edward Bernds, had written not this film, but a 1955 Bowery Boys film also titled High Society.

According to the book Inside Oscar, Steve Broidy, president of The Bowery Boys home studio Allied Artists, told the press: "This just proves what we've known all along – that the Bowery Boys series couldn't have lasted this long if not for the fine writers." The joking in the press aside, Ullman and Bernds sent a telegram to the Academy Award Board of Governors, acknowledging the error and requesting that their names be removed from the final ballot.

Year	Award	Category	Nominee(s)	Result	Ref.
1957	Academy Awards	Best Scoring of a Musical Picture	Johnny Green and Saul Chaplin	Nominated	
1957	Academy Awards	Best Song	"True Love"; Music and Lyrics by Cole Porter	Nominated	
1957	Writers Guild of America Awards	Best Written American Musical	John Patrick	Nominated	

== Broadway adaptation ==
More than 40 years following the film's release, High Society was adapted for the stage as a Broadway musical with several Porter songs from other sources added to the score. The stage version of High Society opened on April 27, 1998, at the St. James Theatre, starring Melissa Errico as Tracy Lord, Daniel McDonald as C.K. Dexter Haven, Stephen Bogardus as Mike Conner, John McMartin as Uncle Willie, and, in her Broadway debut, a 12-year-old Anna Kendrick as Dinah Lord. Kendrick and McMartin received Tony Award nominations for their work as Best Featured Actress in a Musical and Best Featured Actor in a Musical. The show ran for 144 performances.

== See also ==
- List of American films of 1956
