= Barrett Deems =

American musician (1914–1998)

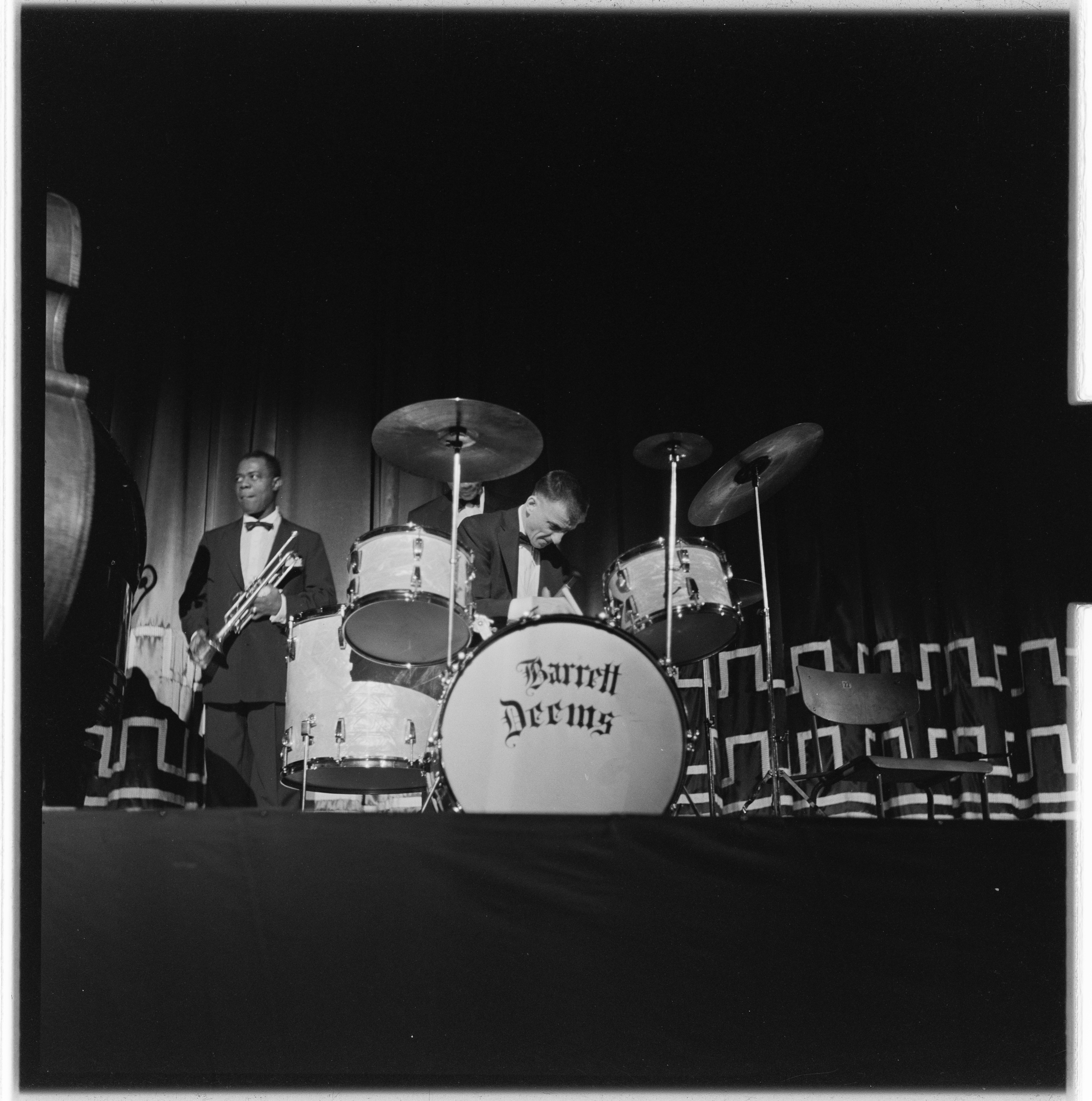

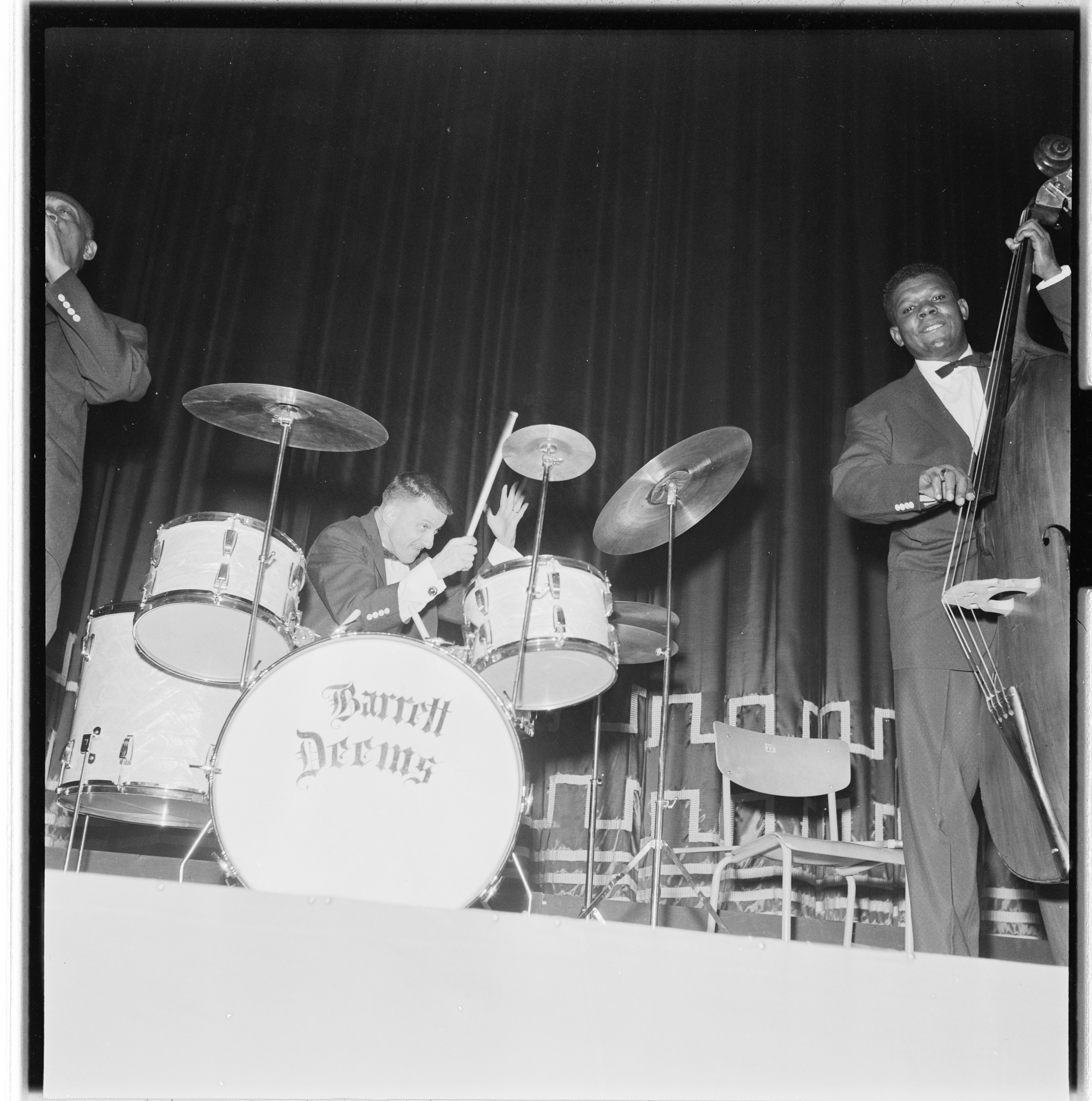

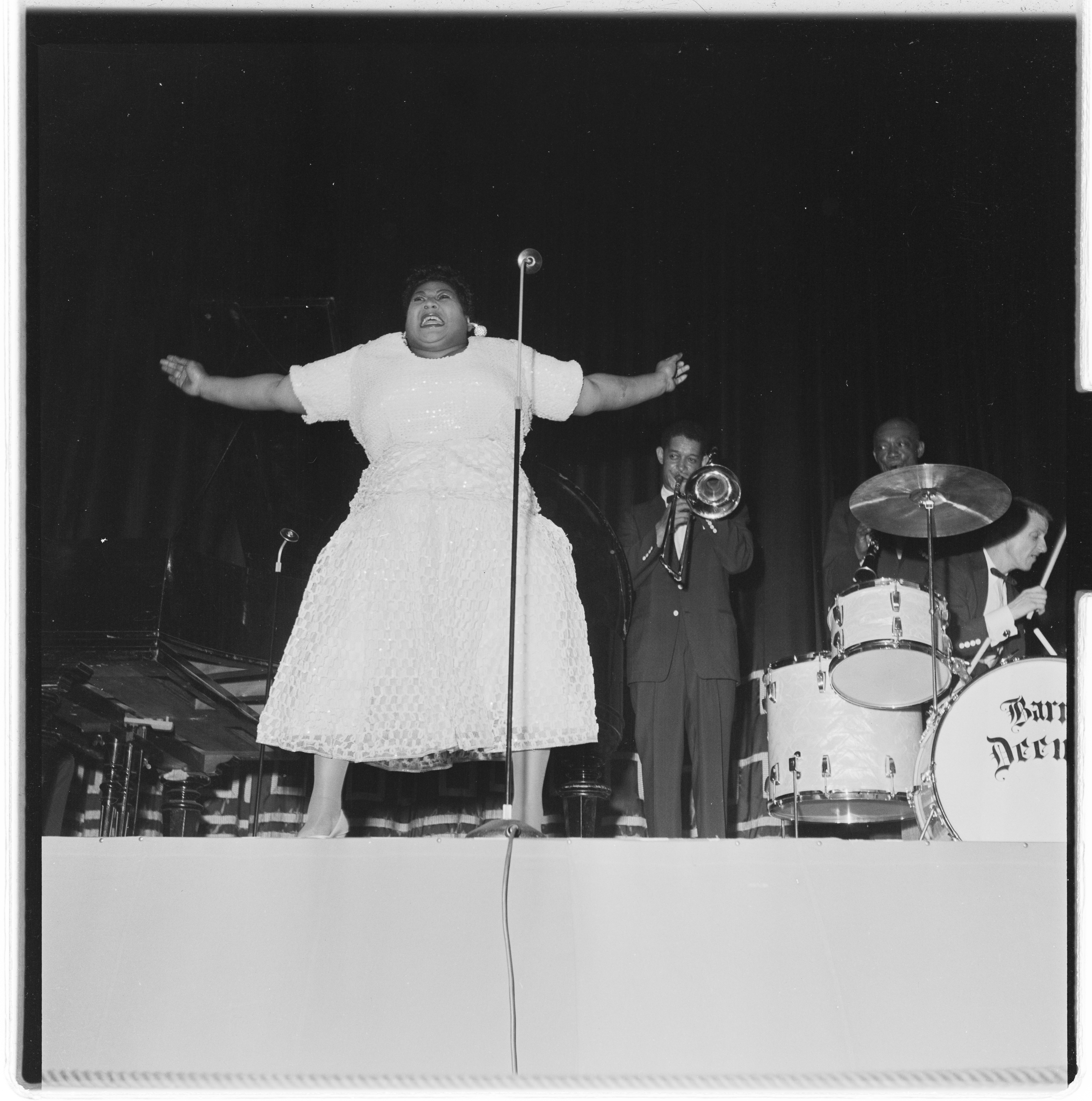
Barrett Deems performs with Louis Armstrong band and Velma Middleton in Oslo, Norway in 1955.

Barrett Deems (March 1, 1914 – September 15, 1998) was an American swing drummer from Springfield, Illinois. He worked in bands led by Louis Armstrong, Jimmy Dorsey, Red Norvo, and Muggsy Spanier.

In High Society, a 1956 film, Deems performs a drum solo during a scene in the back of a bus. In addition, when Louis Armstrong and His All Stars play "Now You Has Jazz", C. K. Dexter Haven (Bing Crosby) introduces the band members, including Deems, who performs a short drum solo.

Deems was married twice. He died in September 1998 of pneumonia at age 84. His second wife, Jane Johnson resides in Momence, Illinois.
