= Who Wants to Be a Millionaire? (song) =

Song by Cole Porter

"Who Wants to Be a Millionaire?" is a song written by Cole Porter for the 1956 film High Society, where it was introduced by Frank Sinatra and Celeste Holm.

In the lyrics of the song, the singers express their lack of interest in supersonic planes and country estates, concluding that "all I want is you". In the film, the song is performed whilst the characters look at expensive wedding gifts.

The song also appeared in the 1973 Christmas special of The Goodies television series, The Goodies and the Beanstalk. It later inspired the title of the popular game show Who Wants to Be a Millionaire? It also makes a brief appearance in the miniseries Quiz, when it is sung in a dream sequence by the key figures of the 2001 Who Wants to Be a Millionaire cheating scandal.

== Notable recordings ==
- Frank Sinatra and Celeste Holm - High Society (1956)
- Thompson Twins for the AIDS benefit release Red Hot + Blue. (1990)
- Susannah McCorkle- Easy to Love: The Songs of Cole Porter (1996)
- Todd Gordon and Clare Teal with the Royal Air Force Squadronaires big band for the 2012 album, Helping the Heroes.
