= Lonnie Donegan =

British skiffle singer (1931–2002)

Lonnie Donegan MBE
- Donegan in the 1970s

Background information
- Also known as: The King of Skiffle
- Born: Anthony James Donegan; 29 April 1931; Bridgeton, Glasgow, Scotland
- Died: 3 November 2002 (aged 71) Market Deeping, Lincolnshire, England
- Genres: Skiffle; traditional pop; blues; folk; country
- Occupations: Singer; songwriter; musician
- Instruments: Guitar; vocals; banjo
- Years active: 1949–2002
- Labels: Oriole; Decca; Nixa; Pye; London; Atlantic; Columbia; Parlophone; RCA; Philips; Chrysalis; United Artists; Virgin

Anthony James "Lonnie" Donegan (29 April 1931 – 3 November 2002) was a British skiffle singer, songwriter and musician, referred to as the "King of Skiffle", who influenced 1960s British pop and rock musicians. Born in Scotland and brought up in England, Donegan began his career in the British trad jazz revival, but transitioned to skiffle in the mid-1950s, rising to prominence with a hit recording of the American folk song "Rock Island Line", which helped spur the broader UK skiffle movement.

Donegan had 31 UK top-30 hit singles, 24 were successive hits and three were number one. He was the first British male singer with two US top-10 hits. Donegan received an Ivor Novello lifetime achievement award in 1995, and in 2000, he was appointed MBE. He was a pivotal figure in the British Invasion due to his influence in the US in the late 1950s.

== Early life ==
Donegan was born in Bridgeton, Glasgow, Scotland, on 29 April 1931. He was the son of an Irish mother (Mary Josephine Deighan) and a Scots father (Peter John Donegan), a professional violinist who had played with the Scottish National Orchestra. In 1933, when Donegan was aged two, the family moved to East Ham in Essex. Donegan was evacuated to Cheshire to escape the Blitz in the Second World War and attended St Ambrose College in Hale Barns. He lived for a while on Chiswick Mall in Middlesex.

== Trad jazz ==
As a child growing up in the early 1940s, Donegan listened mostly to swing jazz and vocal acts, and became interested in the guitar. Country and western and blues records, particularly by Frank Crumit and Josh White, attracted his interest, and he bought his first guitar at 14 in 1945. He learned songs such as "Frankie and Johnny", "Puttin' On the Style", and "The House of the Rising Sun" by listening to BBC radio broadcasts. By the end of the 1940s, he was playing guitar around London and visiting small jazz clubs.

Donegan first played in a major band after Chris Barber heard that he was a good banjo player, and, on a train, asked him to audition. Donegan had never played the banjo, but he bought one for the audition and succeeded more on personality than talent. His stint with Barber's trad jazz band was interrupted when he was called up for national service in 1949, but while in the army at Southampton, he was the drummer in Ken Grinyer's Wolverines Jazz Band at a local pub. A posting to Vienna brought him into contact with American troops, and access to US records and the American Forces Network radio station.

In 1952, he formed the Tony Donegan Jazzband, which played around London. On 28 June 1952 at the Royal Festival Hall, they opened for blues musician Lonnie Johnson. Donegan adopted his first name as a tribute. He used the name at a concert at the Royal Albert Hall on 2 June 1952.

In 1953, cornetist Ken Colyer was imprisoned in New Orleans for a visa problem. He returned to Britain and joined Chris Barber's band. They changed the name to Ken Colyer's Jazzmen and made their first public appearance on 11 April 1953 in Copenhagen. The following day, Chris Albertson recorded Ken Colyer's Jazzmen and the Monty Sunshine Trio—Sunshine, Barber, and Donegan—for Storyville Records. These were amongst Donegan's first commercial recordings.

== Skiffle ==
While in Ken Colyer's Jazzmen with Chris Barber, Donegan sang and played guitar and banjo in their Dixieland set. He began playing with two other band members during the intervals, to provide what posters called a "skiffle" break, a name suggested by Ken Colyer's brother, Bill, after the Dan Burley Skiffle Group of the 1930s. In 1954, Colyer left and the band became Chris Barber's Jazz Band.

With a washboard, tea-chest bass, and a cheap Spanish guitar, Donegan played folk and blues songs by artists such as Lead Belly and Woody Guthrie. This proved popular, and in July 1954, he recorded a fast version of Lead Belly's "Rock Island Line", featuring a washboard, but not a tea-chest bass, with "John Henry" on the B-side. It was a hit in 1956 (which also later inspired the creation of a full album, An Englishman Sings American Folk Songs, released in America on the Mercury label in the early 1960s), but because it was a band recording, Donegan made no money beyond his session fee. It was the first debut record to go gold in the UK, and it reached the top 10 in the United States.

The Acoustic Music Organisation made this comment about Donegan's "Rock Island Line": "It flew up the English charts. Donegan had synthesized American southern blues with simple acoustic instruments - acoustic guitar, washtub bass, and washboard rhythm. The new style was called 'skiffle'.... and referred to music from people with little money for instruments. The new style captivated an entire generation of postwar youth in England."

His next single for Decca, "Diggin' My Potatoes", was recorded at a concert at the Royal Festival Hall on 30 October 1954. Decca dropped Donegan thereafter, but within a month, he was at the Abbey Road Studios in London recording for EMI's Columbia label. He had left the Barber band, and by spring 1955, signed a recording contract with Pye. His next single, "Lost John", reached number two in the UK Singles Chart.

He appeared on television in the United States on the Perry Como Show and the Paul Winchell Show. Returning to the UK, he recorded his debut album, Lonnie Donegan Showcase, in summer 1956, with songs by Lead Belly and Leroy Carr, plus "Ramblin' Man" and "Wabash Cannonball". The LP sold hundreds of thousands. The skiffle style encouraged amateurs, and one of many groups that followed was the Quarrymen, formed in March 1957 by John Lennon. Donegan's "Gamblin' Man"/"Puttin' On the Style" single was number one in the UK in July 1957, when Lennon first met Paul McCartney. His skiffle rendition of Hank Snow's country song "Nobody's Child" was also the inspiration for Tony Sheridan's blues version, which he recorded with the Beatles as his backing band.

Donegan went on to successes such as "Cumberland Gap" and "Does Your Chewing Gum Lose Its Flavour (On the Bedpost Overnight?)", his biggest hit in the US, on Dot. He turned to music hall style with "My Old Man's a Dustman", which was not well received by skiffle fans and unsuccessful in America on Atlantic in 1960, but it reached number one in the UK. Donegan's group had a flexible line-up, but was generally Denny Wright or Les Bennetts, playing lead guitar and singing harmony, Micky Ashman or Pete Huggett—later Steve Jones—on upright bass, Nick Nichols—later Pete Appleby, Mark Goodwin, and Donegan playing acoustic guitar or banjo and singing the lead.

His last hit single on the UK chart was his cover version of "Pick a Bale of Cotton". His fall from the chart coincided with the rise of the Beatles and the other beat music performers whom he inspired.

== Starring in pantomime ==
Lonegan frequently appeared in pantomime; for example as "Buttons" in Cinderella in Nottingham. During his three years in the role there, he met actress Jill Westlake, who played the title role. The couple announced their engagement in 1964 and later married. Donegan reprised his role as Buttons in Glasgow's Alhambra Theatre in 1966 - his first Scottish season. The Ugly Sisters were played by Stanley Baxter and Ronnie Corbett

== Later career ==
Donegan recorded sporadically during the 1960s, including sessions at Hickory Records in Nashville with Charlie McCoy, Floyd Cramer, and the Jordanaires. After 1964, he was a record producer for most of the decade at Pye Records. Justin Hayward was one of the artists with whom he worked.

Donegan was not popular through the late 1960s and 1970s (although his "I'll Never Fall in Love Again" was recorded by Tom Jones in 1967 and Elvis Presley in 1976), and he began to play the American cabaret circuit. A departure from his normal style was an a cappella recording of "The Party's Over".

In 1965 Donegan met Justin Hayward when Hayward was 17 and eventually persuaded him to sign an eight-year publishing contract as a songwriter, a move Hayward later regretted, as it meant the rights to all his Moody Blues songs written before 1974 would always be owned by Donegan's Tyler Music.

Donegan reunited with the original Chris Barber band for a concert in Croydon in June 1975. A bomb scare meant that the recording had to be finished in the studio, after an impromptu concert in the car park. The release was titled The Great Re-Union Album. He collaborated with Rory Gallagher on several songs, notably "Rock Island Line" with Gallagher performing most of the elaborate guitar work.

He had his first heart attack in 1976 while in the United States and had quadruple bypass surgery. He returned to attention in 1978, when he recorded his early songs with Rory Gallagher, Ringo Starr, Elton John, and Brian May. The album was called Putting on the Style. A follow-up featuring Albert Lee had Donegan in less familiar country and western vein. By 1980, he was making regular concert appearances again, and another album with Barber followed. In 1983, Donegan toured with Billie Jo Spears, and in 1984, he made his theatrical debut in a revival of the 1920 musical Mr Cinders. More concert tours followed, with a move from Florida to Spain. In 1992, he had further bypass surgery following another heart attack.

In 1994, the Chris Barber band celebrated 40 years with a tour with both bands. Pat Halcox was still on trumpet (a position he retained until July 2008). The reunion concert and the tour were released CD and DVD.

Donegan had a late renaissance, when in 2000, he appeared on Van Morrison's album The Skiffle Sessions – Live in Belfast 1998, an acclaimed album featuring him singing with Morrison and Chris Barber, with a guest appearance by Dr John. Donegan also played at the Glastonbury Festival in 1999, and was made an MBE in 2000.

Donegan also appeared at Fairport Convention's annual music festival on 9 August 2001. His final CD was This Yere de Story.

== Personal life ==
Donegan married three times. He had two daughters (Fiona and Corrina) with his first wife, Maureen Tyler (divorced 1962), a son and a daughter with his second wife, Jill Westlake (divorced 1971), and three sons with his third wife, Sharon, whom he married in 1977.

His son Peter Donegan started touring as his father's pianist when he was 18. In 2019, Peter was a contestant on The Voice UK, where he sang "Bless the Broken Road" for his blind audition. After Tom Jones turned his chair for Peter, they duetted the song "I'll Never Fall in Love Again", which Lonnie Donegan wrote, and Jones released in 1967.

Donegan had cardiac problems since the 1970s, and suffered several heart attacks. He died on 3 November 2002, aged 71, after having a heart attack in Market Deeping, Lincolnshire midway through a UK tour. He was due to perform at a memorial concert for George Harrison with the Rolling Stones.

== Legacy ==
Mark Knopfler released a tribute to Lonnie Donegan titled "Donegan's Gone" on his 2004 album, Shangri-La, and said he was one of his greatest influences. Donegan's music formed a musical starring his two sons. Lonnie D – The Musical took its name from the Chas & Dave tribute song that started the show. Subsequently, Peter Donegan formed a band to perform his father's material, and has since linked with his father's band from the last 30 years with newcomer Eddie Masters on bass. They made an album together in 2009 titled Here We Go Again. Lonnie Donegan's eldest son, Anthony, also formed his own band, as Lonnie Donegan Jr, who also performed "World Cup Willie" for the 2010 FIFA World Cup in South Africa.

On his album A Beach Full of Shells, Al Stewart paid tribute to Donegan in the song "Katherine of Oregon". In "Class of '58", he describes a British entertainer who is either Donegan or a composite including him. In a 2023 video interview with Steve Houk, Stewart described "Rock Island Line" as a record "that completely changed the complexion of English society, and changed my life and everybody else's".

Peter Sellers recorded Puttin' on the Smile featuring "Lenny Goonigan", who travels to the "Deep South" of Brighton and finds an "obscure folk song hidden at the top of the American hit parade", re-records it and reaches number one in the UK.

David Letterman pretended to try to remember Jimmy Fallon's name during the Tonight Show conflict between Jay Leno and Conan O'Brien, calling Fallon "Lonnie Donegan".

In the 2019 movie Judy, actor John Dagleish portrays Lonnie Donegan, who replaces an ill Judy Garland. He is shown in the (entirely fictional) final scene generously allowing her to make one last appearance on stage.

=== Quotations ===
- "I'm trying to sing acceptable folk music. I want to widen the audience beyond the artsy-craftsy crowd and the pseudo intellectuals–but without distorting the music itself". NME – June 1956.
- "In Britain, we were separated from our folk music tradition centuries ago and were imbued with the idea that music was for the upper classes. You had to be very clever to play music. When I came along with the old three chords, people began to think that if I could do it, so could they. It was the reintroduction of the folk music bridge which did that". – Interview, 2002.
- "He was the first person we had heard of from Britain to get to the coveted No. 1 in the charts, and we studied his records avidly. We all bought guitars to be in a skiffle group. He was the man". – Paul McCartney.
- "If there was no Lead Belly, there would have been no Lonnie Donegan. No Lonnie Donegan, no Beatles. Therefore no Lead Belly, no Beatles". – George Harrison.
- "He really was at the very cornerstone of English blues and rock". – Brian May.
- "I wanted to be Elvis Presley when I grew up, I knew that. But the man who really made me feel like I could actually go out and do it was a chap by the name of Lonnie Donegan". – Roger Daltrey.
- "Remember, Lonnie Donegan started it for you". – Jack White's acceptance speech at the Brit Awards.
- "You know in my little span of life I've come across such a sea of bigotries and prejudices. I get so fed up with it now. I feel I have to do something about it". – BBC Panorama.

== Discography ==
- Lonnie Donegan Showcase (1956)
- Lonnie (1958)
- Lonnie Rides Again (1959)
- Sing Hallelujah (December 1962)
- The Lonnie Donegan Folk Album (1965)
- Lonniepops – Lonnie Donegan Today (1970)
- Lonnie Donegan Meets Leinemann (1974)
- Country Roads (1976)
- Puttin' on the Style (1978)
- Sundown (1978)
- Muleskinner Blues (1999)

== See also ==
- List of honorific titles in popular music
