= 1950s in music =

For music from a year in the 1950s, go to 50 | 51 | 52 | 53 | 54 | 55 | 56 | 57 | 58 | 59

This article includes an overview of the major events and trends in popular music in the 1950s.

In North America and Europe, the 1950s were revolutionary in regards to popular music, as it started a dramatic shift from traditional pop music to modern pop music, largely in part due to the rise of rock and roll.

Rock and roll began to dominate popular music starting in the mid-1950s with origins in a variety of genres including blues, rhythm & blues, country, and pop. Major rock and roll artists include Elvis Presley, Buddy Holly, Chuck Berry, Little Richard, Jerry Lee Lewis, Ritchie Valens, Eddie Cochran, Gene Vincent, Carl Perkins, Bill Haley, and Larry Williams. Rock and roll helped the electric guitar become the dominating instrument in popular music starting in the 1950s, and the decade saw the release of the Fender Stratocaster and Gibson Les Paul. In the ensuing decades rock and roll would branch out to a variety of genres and sub-genres all under the umbrella of rock music, with rock music becoming the dominant musical genre throughout the 20th century.

Doo-Wop, a genre of rhythm & blues music that originated in the 1940s, rose in prominence along with the rise of rock & roll. Popular doo-wop artists of the 1950s include The Platters, Dion and the Belmonts, Frankie Lymon, The Five Satins, The Flamingos, and The Del-Vikings. While the popularity of the genre wained after the early 1960s, it would go on to influence many styles of pop and rock music

Traditional pop music experienced a decline in popularity starting in the mid-1950s, however, artists such as Perry Como and Patti Page dominated the pop charts during the first half of the decade, and artists such as Frank Sinatra and Dean Martin remained popular throughout the 1950s and the ensuing decades.

The 1950s were one of country's most influential decades, with artists such as Johnny Cash, Hank Williams, and Patsy Cline being some of the decade's most notable. The honky-tonk style of country music remained heavily popular during the decade, and the late 1950s gave rise to the Nashville sound.

Blues music was highly influential to popular music in the 1950s, having directly influenced rock & roll, and many blues and rhythm & blues artists found commercial success throughout the 1950s, such as Ray Charles.

The birth of soul music occurred during the 1950s, and the genre would come to dominate the US R&B charts by the early 1960s. Soul artists of the 1950s include Sam Cooke and James Brown.

Jazz music was revolutionized during the 1950s with the rise of bebop, hard bop, modal jazz, and cool jazz. Notable jazz artists of the time include Miles Davis, Dave Brubeck, Thelonious Monk, Bill Evans, John Coltrane, and Chet Baker.

The lush easy listening genre also enjoyed widespread popularity in the United States during the 1950s. Originating in the late 1940s, this genre now commanded widespread interest on radio, television, films and LPs until the late 1960s, when it was eclipsed by Rock and Roll. Notable soloists, orchestras, composers and arrangers in this genre included: Ray Bloch, Nat King Cole, Perry Como, Xavier Cugat, Doris Day, Percy Faith, Ferrante and Teicher, Jackie Gleason, Andre Kostelanetz, Michel Legrand, Guy Lombardo, Henry Mancini, Annunzio Paolo Mantovani, Freddy Martin Johnny Mathis George Melachrino, Mills Brothers, Stu Phillips, Andre Previn Edmundo Ros, Three Suns, John Serry, Paul Weston and Patrick Williams.

In Europe, the European Broadcasting Union started the Eurovision Song Contest in 1956. In France, the Chanson Française genre dominated the music scene.

Popular Latin styles of the 1950s include the mambo, salsa, and merengue.

The bossa nova genre came to prominence in Rio de Janeiro in Brazil during the 1950s and would grow to become a genre popular worldwide.

== Genres ==
Various genre in the First World, rock and roll, doo-wop, pop, swing, rhythm and blues, blues, Country music, rockabilly, easy listening, and jazz music dominated and defined the decade's music.

== United States ==
=== Rock and roll ===
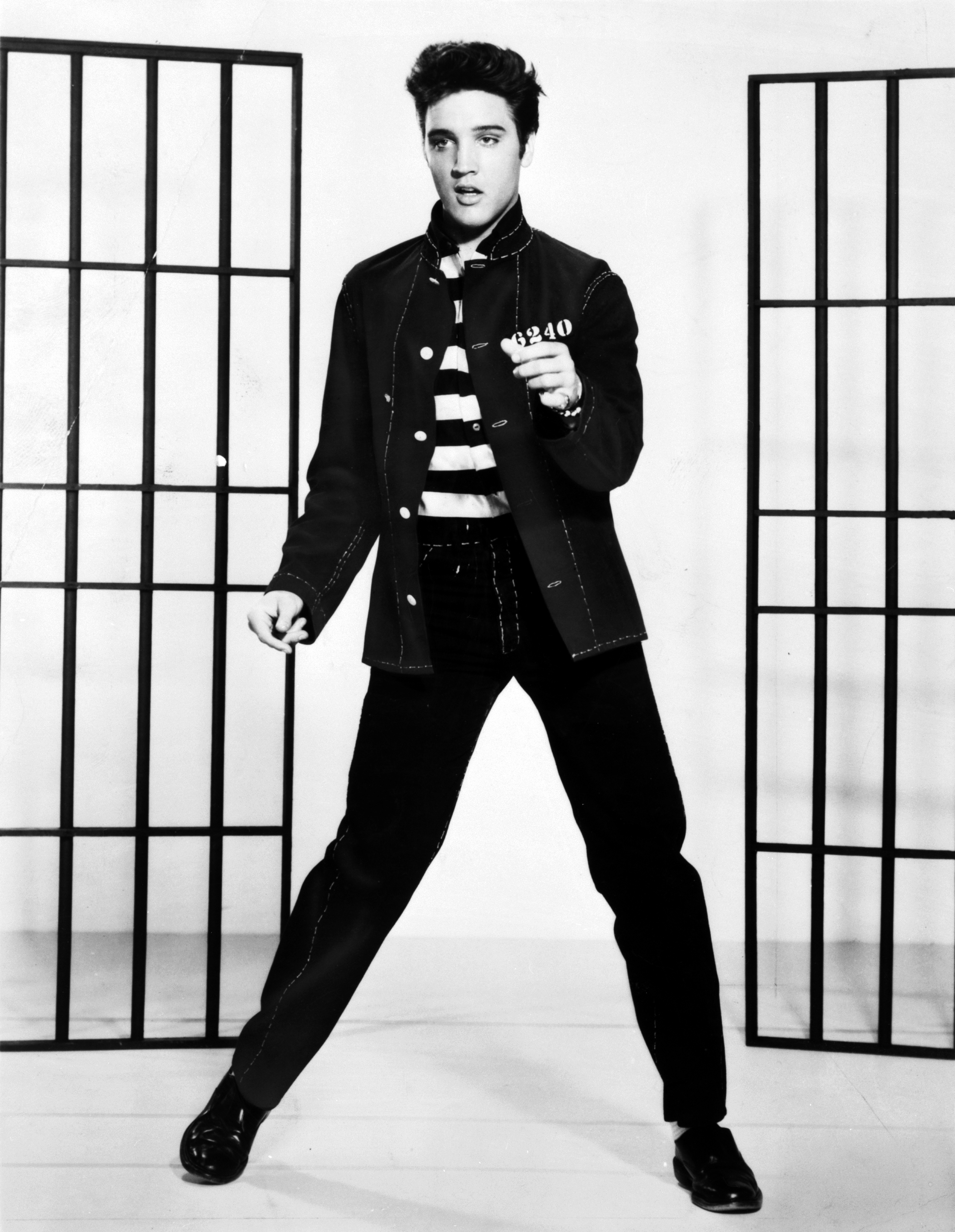
Elvis Presley, 1957

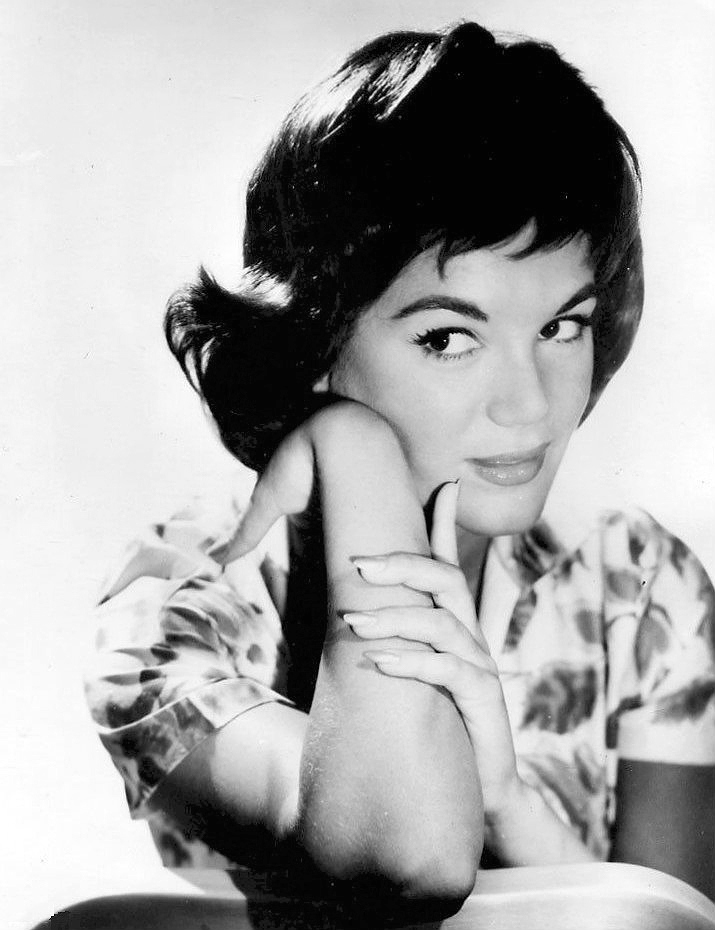
Connie Francis—called the "First Lady of Rock & Roll"

Rock and roll dominated popular music in the mid and late 1950s, and quickly spread to much of the rest of the world. Its immediate origins lay in a mixing together of various black musical genres of the time, including rhythm and blues and gospel music, with country and western and pop. In 1951, Cleveland, Ohio disc jockey Alan Freed began playing rhythm and blues music for a multi-racial audience, and is credited with first using the phrase "rock and roll" to describe the music.

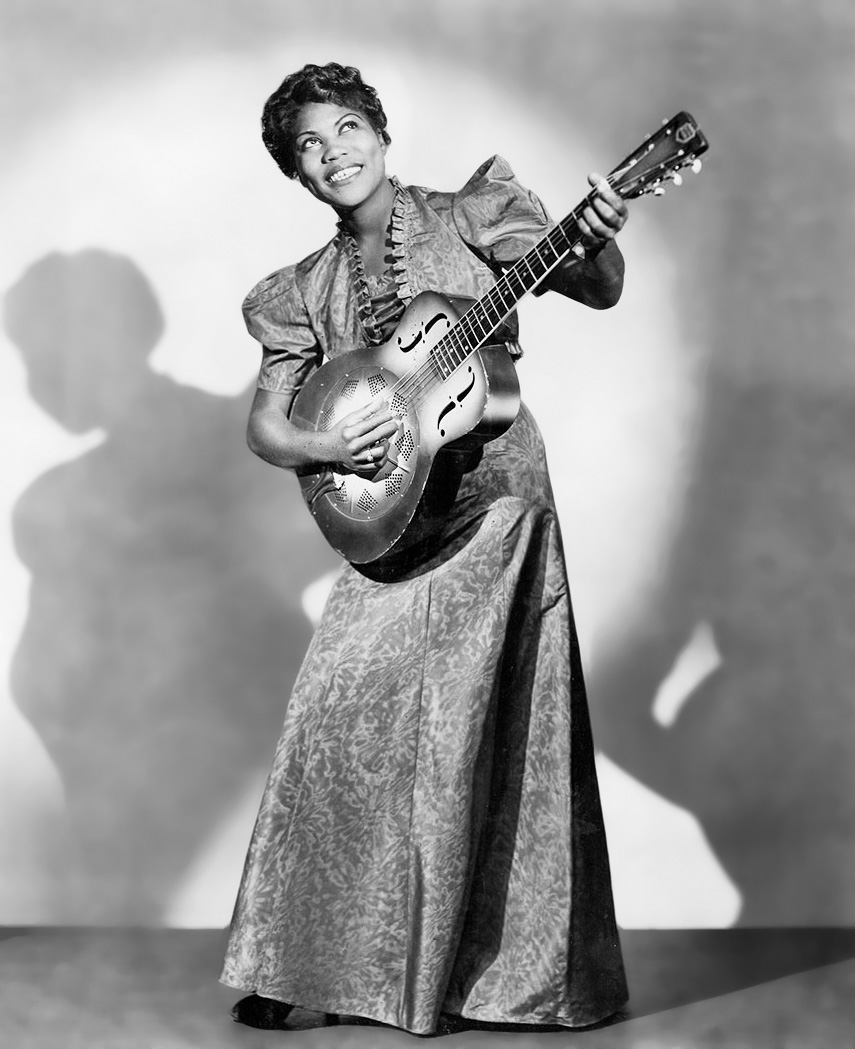
Sister Rosetta Tharpe "godmother of rock 'n' roll"

The 1950s saw the growth in popularity of the big boom electric guitar (developed and popularized by Les Paul). Paul's hit records like "How High the Moon", and "The World Is Waiting for the Sunrise", helped lead to the development of a specifically rock and roll style of playing of such complicated exponents as Chuck Berry, Link Wray, and Scotty Moore. Chuck Berry, who is considered to be one of the pioneers of Rock and roll music, refined and developed the major elements that made rock and roll distinctive, focusing on teen life and introducing guitar solos and showmanship that would be a major influence on subsequent rock music. A decade earlier, Sister Rosetta Tharpe fused gospel and blues, inventing rock 'n roll electric guitar by developing sophisticated phrasing and licks that served as the basis for the iconic rock'n'roll guitar style of the 1950s and beyond.

Artists such as Little Richard, Elvis Presley, Chuck Berry, Bill Haley and His Comets, Bo Diddley, Fats Domino, Jerry Lee Lewis, Big Joe Turner, and Gene Vincent released the initial rhythm and blues–influenced early rock and roll hits. Rock and roll forerunners in the popular music field included Johnnie Ray, The Crew-Cuts, The Fontane Sisters, and Les Paul and Mary Ford. The Rock and Roll Era is generally dated from the 25 March 1955 premiere of the motion picture The Blackboard Jungle. This film's use of Bill Haley and His Comets' "(We're Gonna) Rock Around the Clock" during the opening credits caused a national sensation when teenagers started dancing in the aisles.

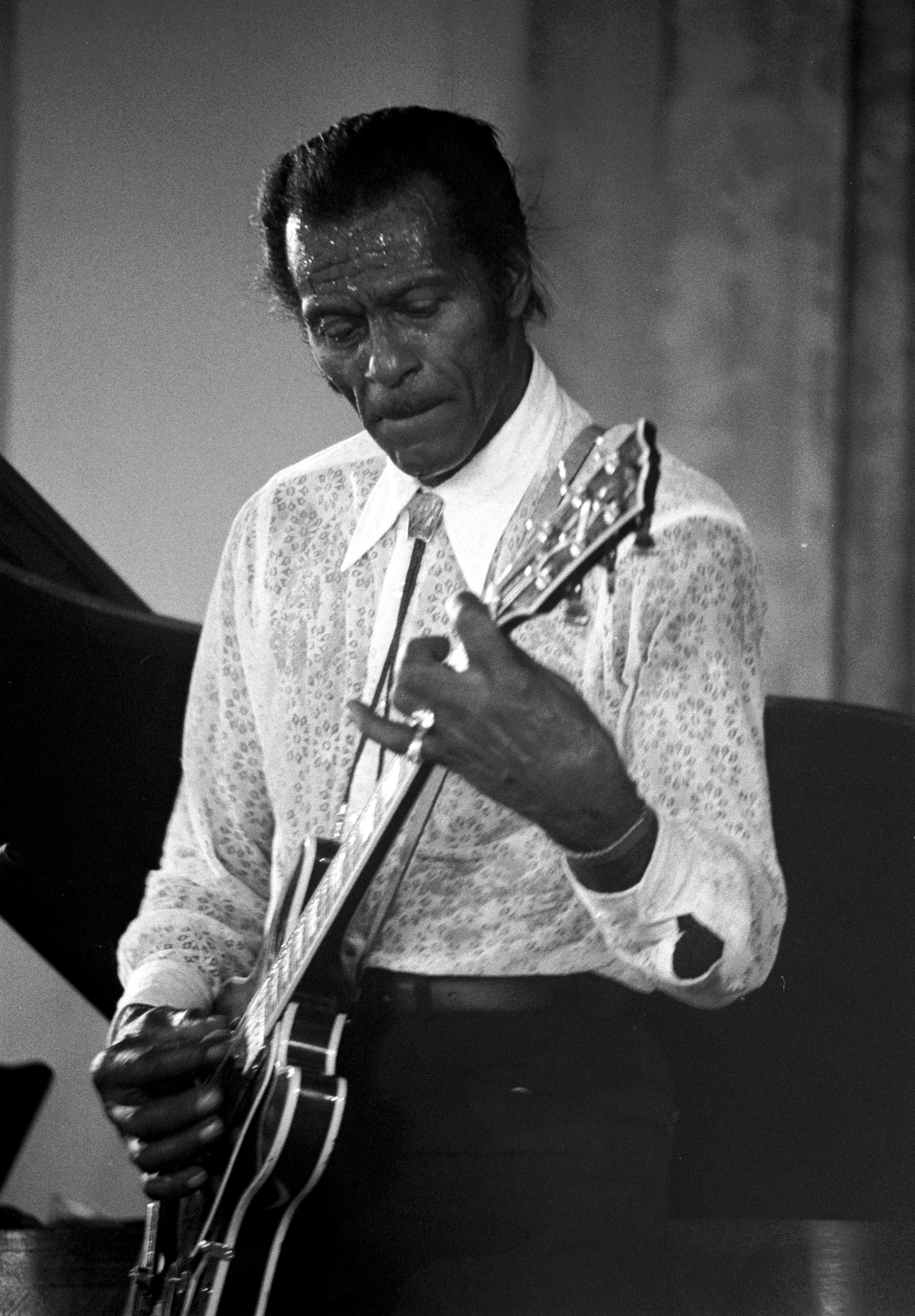
Chuck Berry

Pat Boone became one of the most successful artists of the 50s with his heavily pop-influenced "covers" of R&B hits like "Two Hearts, Two Kisses (Make One Love)", "Ain't That a Shame", and "At My Front Door (Crazy Little Mama)". Boone got his fame by covering black R&B hits; his cover versions of the original artists outsold the originals. Boone removed the raw feel of the original versions and replaced it with his own voice, making it safer and appropriate for mainstream pop radio stations at the time. Boone later found success with ballads and less with R&B covers because R&B covers were declining due to the fact that most people at the time were preferring the originals. Boone's traditional pop approach to rock and roll, coupled with his All-American, clean-cut image helped bring the new sound to a much wider audience.

Elvis Presley, who began his career in the mid-1950s, was the most successful artist of the popular sound of the Rock and Roll Era, with a series of network television appearances, motion pictures, and chart-topping records. Elvis also brought rock and roll widely into the mainstream of popular culture. Elvis popularized the four-man group and also brought the guitar to become the lead instrument in rock music. Presley popularized rockabilly, a genre that combined country with rhythm and blues which some claimed it was a new sound. Some claimed that Presley invented the genre by combining country with rhythm and blues. Elvis became the biggest pop craze since Glenn Miller and Frank Sinatra. His energized interpretations of songs, many from African American sources, and his uninhibited performance style made him enormously popular—and controversial—during that period. Presley's massive success brought rock and roll widely into the mainstream and made it easier for African-American musicians to achieve mainstream success on the pop charts. Boone and Presley's styles and images represented opposite ends of the burgeoning musical form—Boone was known as being safe while Presley was known as being dangerous, which competed with one another throughout the remainder of the decade.

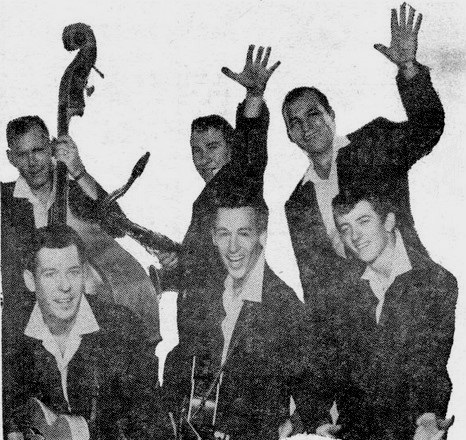
The Champs most famous for their Latin-tinged instrumental "Tequila".

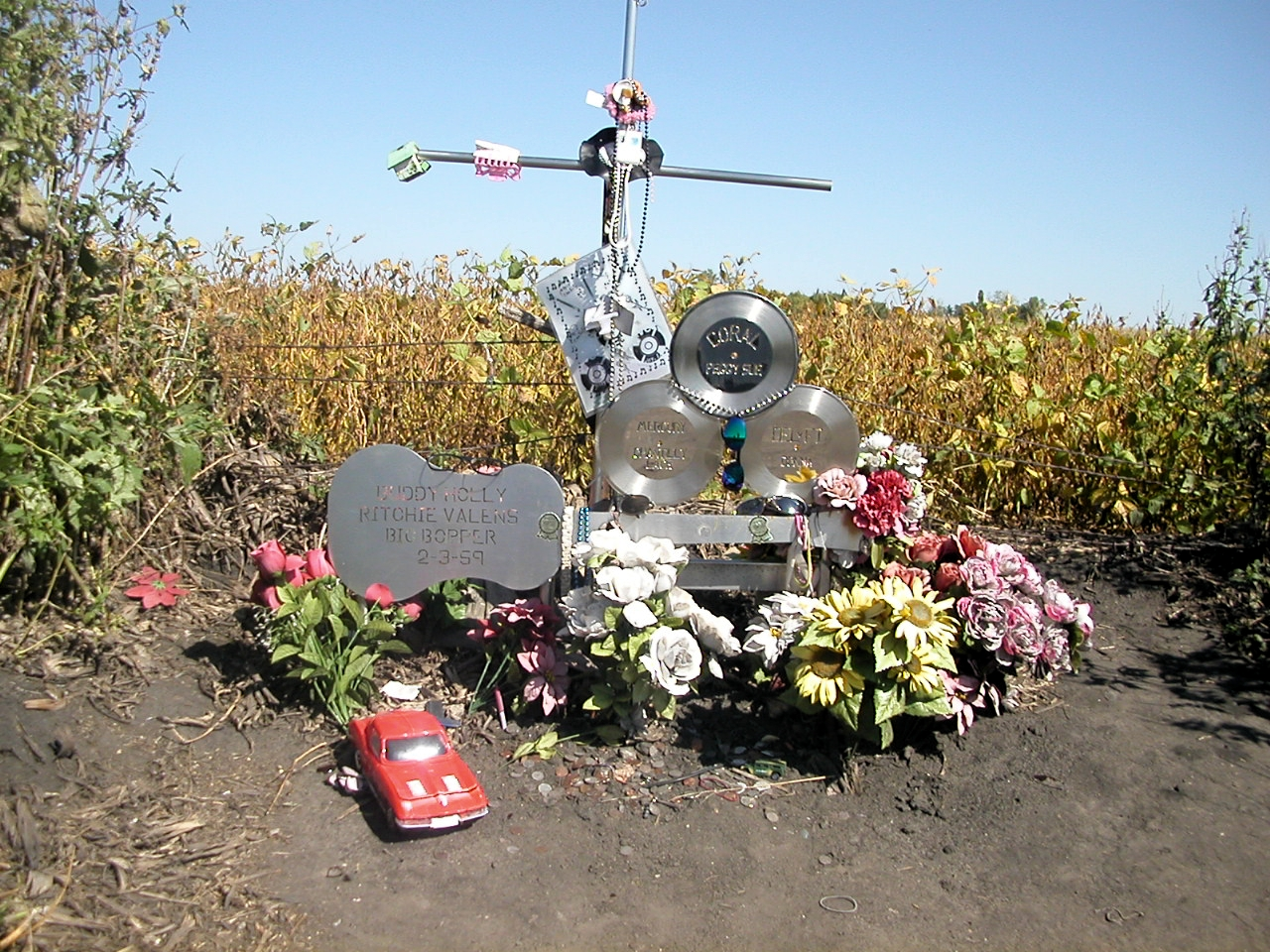
Monument to Buddy Holly, Ritchie Valens, and J. P. Richardson ("The Big Bopper").

In 1957, a popular television show featuring rock and roll performers, American Bandstand, went national. Hosted by Dick Clark, the program helped to popularize the more clean-cut, All-American brand of rock and roll. By the end of the decade, teen idols like Bobby Darin, Ricky Nelson, Frankie Avalon, Paul Anka, Neil Sedaka, Bobby Rydell, Connie Francis, and Fabian Forte were topping the charts. Some commentators have perceived this as the decline of rock and roll; citing the deaths of Buddy Holly, The Big Bopper and Ritchie Valens in a tragic plane crash in 1959 and the departure of Elvis for the army as causes.

On the other side of the spectrum, R&B-influenced acts like The Crows, The Penguins, The El Dorados, and The Turbans all scored major hits, and groups like The Platters, with songs including "The Great Pretender" (1955), and The Coasters with humorous songs like "Yakety Yak" (1958), ranked among the most successful rock and roll acts of the period.

Rock and roll has also been seen as leading to a number of distinct subgenres, including rockabilly (see below) in the 1950s, combining rock and roll with "hillbilly" country music, which was usually played and recorded in the mid-1950s by white singers such as Carl Perkins, Jerry Lee Lewis, Buddy Holly and with the greatest commercial success, Elvis Presley. Another subgenre, doo-wop, entered the pop charts in the 1950s. Its popularity would spawn the parody "Who Put the Bomp (in the Bomp, Bomp, Bomp)".

Novelty songs, long a music industry staple, continued their popularity in the rock and roll medium with hits such as "Beep Beep".

=== Classic pop ===
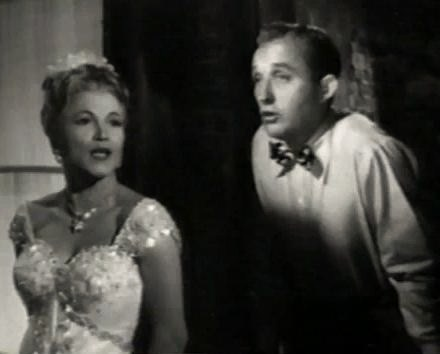
Dorothy Kirsten and Bing Crosby in "Mr. Music".

Popular music dominated the charts for the first half of the decade. Vocal-driven classic pop replaced big band/swing at the end of World War II, although it often used orchestras to back the vocalists. 1940s style Crooners vied with a new generation of big-voiced singers, many drawing on Italian Canto Bella traditions. Mitch Miller, A&R man at the era's most successful label, Columbia Records, set the tone for the development of popular music well into the middle of the decade. Miller integrated country, Western, rhythm & blues, and folk music into the musical mainstream, by having many of his label's biggest artists record them in a style that corresponded to Pop traditions. Miller often employed novel and ear-catching arrangements featuring classical instruments (whooping french horns, harpsichord), or sound effects (whip cracks). He approached each record as a miniature story, often "casting" the vocalist according to type.

(Mitch) Miller and the producers who followed his model was creating a new sort of pop record. Instead of capturing the sound of live groups, they were making three-minute musicals, matching singers to songs in the same way that movie producers matched stars to film roles. As Miller told "Time" magazine in 1951, "Every singer has certain sounds he makes better than others. Frankie Laine is sweat and hard words—he's a guy beating the pillow, a purveyor of basic emotions. Guy Mitchell is better with happy-go-lucky songs; he's a virile young singer, gives people a vicarious lift. Rosemary Clooney is a barrelhouse dame, a hillbilly at heart." It was a way of thinking perfectly suited to the new market in which vocalists were creating unique identities and hit songs were performed as television skits.

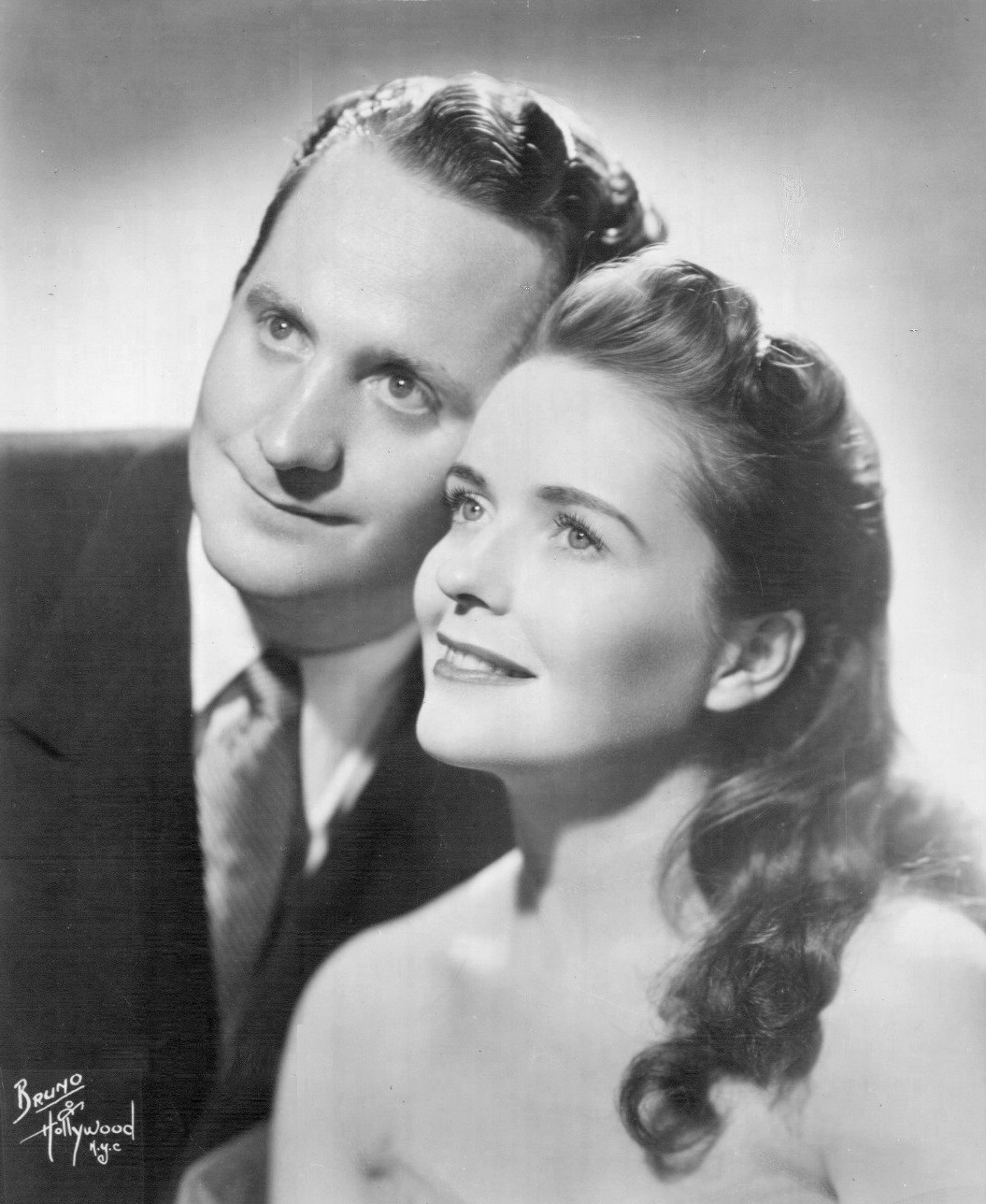
Les Paul and Mary Ford in 1953

Whereas big band/swing music placed the primary emphasis on the orchestration, post-war/early 1950s era Pop focused on the song’s story and/or the emotion being expressed. By the early 1950s, emotional delivery had reached its apex in the miniature psycho-drama songs of writer-singer Johnnie Ray. Known as "The Cry Guy" and "The Prince of Wails", Ray's on-stage emotion wrought "breakdowns" provided a release for the pent-up angst of his predominantly teenage fans. As Ray described it, "I make them feel, I exhaust them, I destroy them." It was during this period that the fan hysteria, which began with Frank Sinatra during the Second World War, really began to take hold.

Although often ignored by musical historians, Pop music played a significant role in the development of rock 'n' roll as well:

[Mitch] Miller also conceived of the idea of the pop record "sound" per se: not so much an arrangement or a tune, but an aural texture (usually replete with extramusical gimmicks) that could be created in the studio and then replicated in live performance, instead of the other way around. Miller was hardly a rock 'n' roller, yet without these ideas, there could never have been rock 'n' roll. "Mule Train", Miller's first major hit (for Frankie Laine) and the foundation of his career, set the pattern for virtually the entire first decade of rock. The similarities between it and, say, "Leader of the Pack," need hardly be outlined here.

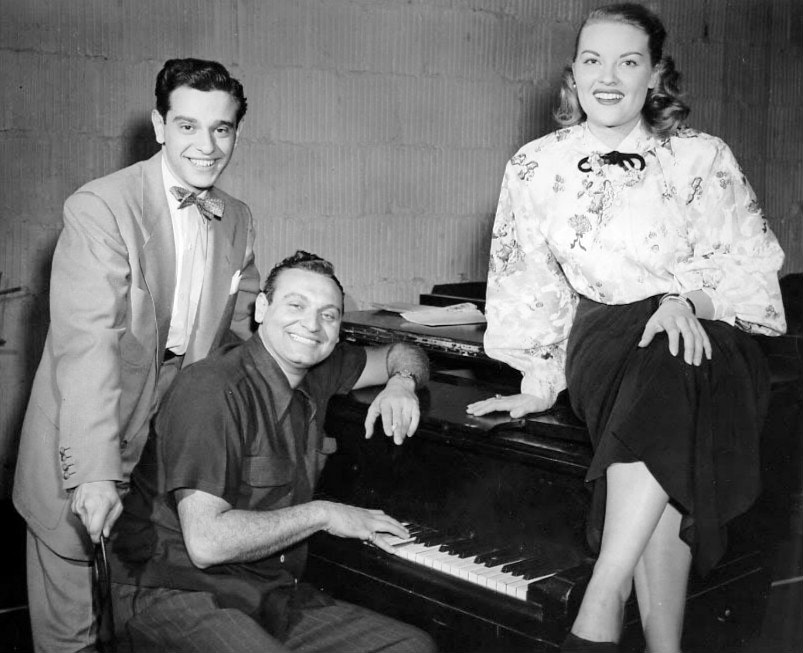
Frankie Laine (at piano) and Patti Page, circa 1950.

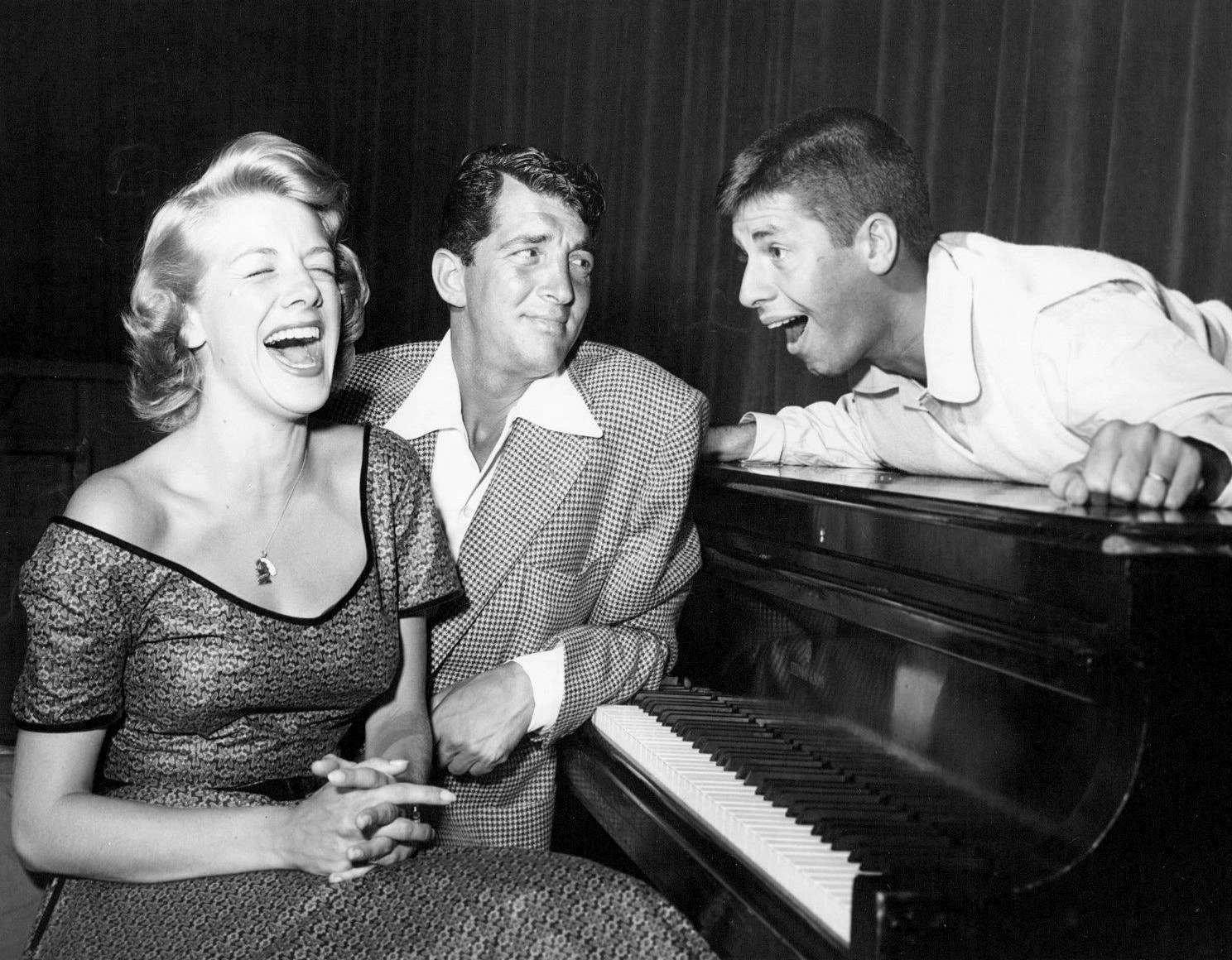
Rosemary Clooney, Dean Martin and Jerry Lewis on TV's The Colgate Comedy Hour, 1952

Patti Page kicked things off with what would become the decade's biggest hit, "Tennessee Waltz". Her other hits from this period included: "Mister and Mississippi", "Mockin' Bird Hill", "Detour", "(How Much Is That) Doggie in the Window", and "Old Cape Cod". Frankie Laine's 1949 hits, "That Lucky Old Sun (Just Rolls Around Heaven All Day)" and "Mule Train", were still riding high on the charts when the decade began. He continued to score with such hits as: "Georgia on My Mind", "Cry of the Wild Goose", "Jezebel", "Rose, Rose, I Love You", "Jealousy (Jalousie)", "High Noon (Do Not Forsake Me)", "I Believe", "Granada", "Moonlight Gambler", and "Rawhide". Johnnie Ray had a long run of hits in the early half of the decade, often backed by The Four Lads, including: "Cry", "The Little White Cloud That Cried", "Walking My Baby Back Home", "Please, Mr. Sun", and "Just Walkin' in the Rain". The Four Lads racked up some hits on their own with "Who Needs You", "No, Not Much", "Standin' on the Corner", and "Moments to Remember". Nat "King" Cole dominated the charts throughout the decade with such timeless classics as "Unforgettable", "Mona Lisa", "Too Young", "Darling, Je Vous Aime Beaucoup", "Pretend", "Smile", and "A Blossom Fell". Perry Como was another frequent visitor to the charts with hits like: "If", "Round and Round", "Don't Let the Stars Get in Your Eyes", "Tina Marie", "Papa Loves Mambo", and "Catch a Falling Star".

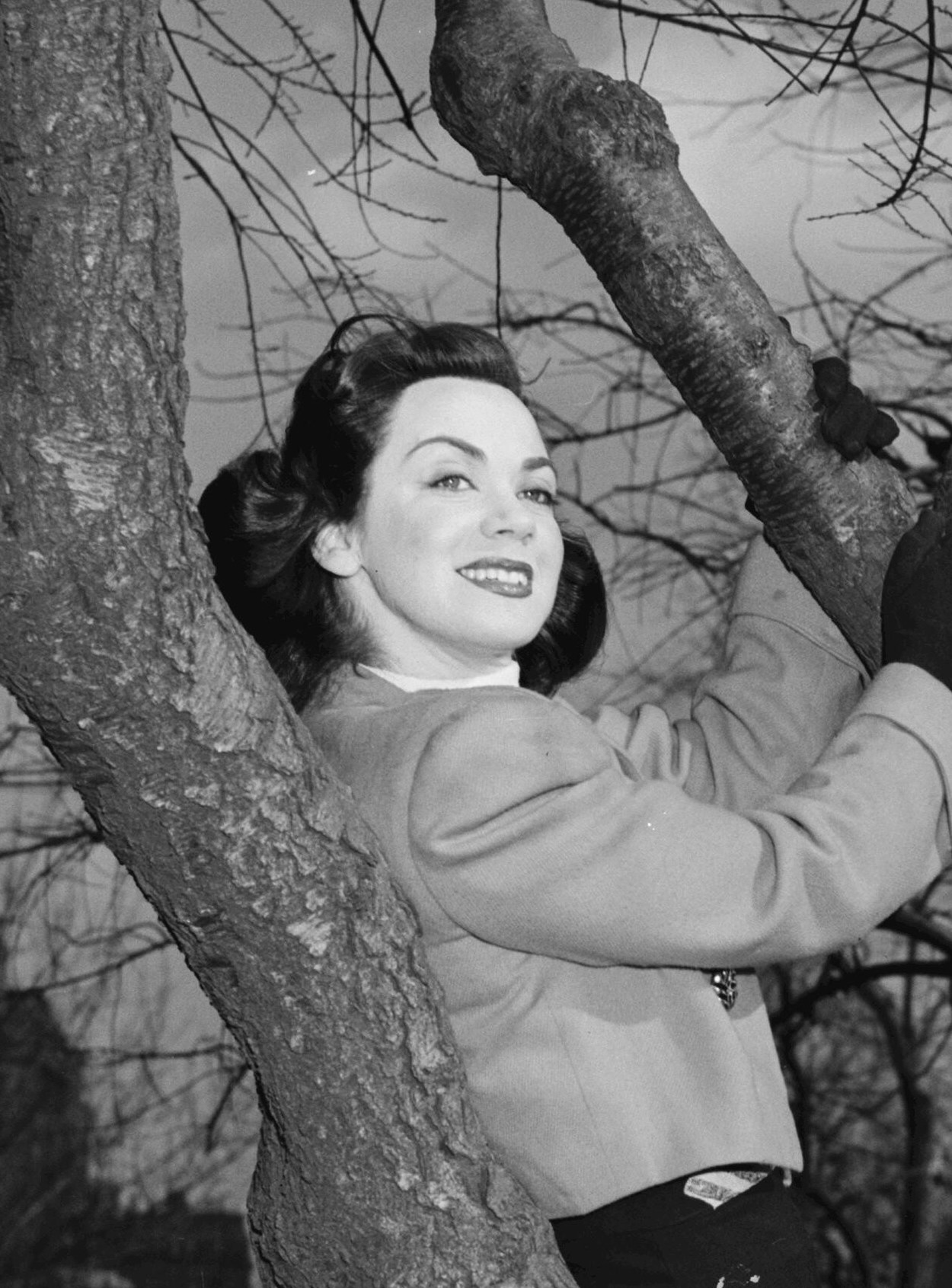
Kitty Kallen was an American popular singer whose career spanned from the 1930s to the 1960s, to include the Swing era of the Big Band years

Other major stars in the early 1950s included Frank Sinatra ("Young at Heart", "Three Coins in the Fountain", "Witchcraft"), Tony Bennett ("Cold, Cold Heart", "Because of You", "Rags to Riches"), Kay Starr ("Bonaparte's Retreat", "Wheel of Fortune", "Rock and Roll Waltz"), Rosemary Clooney ("Come On-a My House", "Mambo Italiano", "Half as Much", "This Ole House"), Dean Martin ("That's Amore", "Return to Me", "Sway"), Georgia Gibbs ("Kiss of Fire", "Dance With Me, Henry", "Tweedle Dee"), Eddie Fisher ("Anytime", "Wish You Were Here", "Thinking of You", "I'm Walking Behind You", "Oh! My Pa-Pa", "Fanny"), Teresa Brewer ("Music! Music! Music!", "Till I Waltz Again With You", "Ricochet (Rick-O-Shay)"), Doris Day ("Secret Love", "Whatever Will Be Will Be (Que Sera Sera)", "Teacher's Pet"), Guy Mitchell ("My Heart Cries for You", "The Roving Kind", "Pittsburgh, Pennsylvania", "Singing the Blues"), Bing Crosby ("Play a Simple Melody with son Gary Crosby, "True Love with Grace Kelly), Dinah Shore ("Lavender Blue"), Kitty Kallen ("Little Things Mean a Lot"), Joni James ("Have You Heard", "Wishing Ring", "Your Cheatin' Heart"), Peggy Lee ("Lover", "Fever"), Julie London ("Cry Me a River"), Toni Arden ("Padre"), June Valli ("Why Don't You Believe Me"), Arthur Godfrey ("Slowpoke"), Tennessee Ernie Ford ("Sixteen Tons"), Les Paul and Mary Ford ("Vaya Con Dios", "Tiger Rag"), and vocal groups like The Mills Brothers ("Glow Worm"), The Weavers "(Goodnight Irene"), The Four Aces ("Love Is a Many-Splendored Thing", "(It's No) Sin"), The Chordettes ("Mister Sandman"), Fontane Sisters ("Hearts of Stone"), The Hilltoppers ("Trying", "P.S. I Love You"), The McGuire Sisters ("Sincerely", "Goodnite, Sweetheart, Goodnite", "Sugartime") and The Ames Brothers ("Ragmop" "The Naughty Lady of Shady Lane").

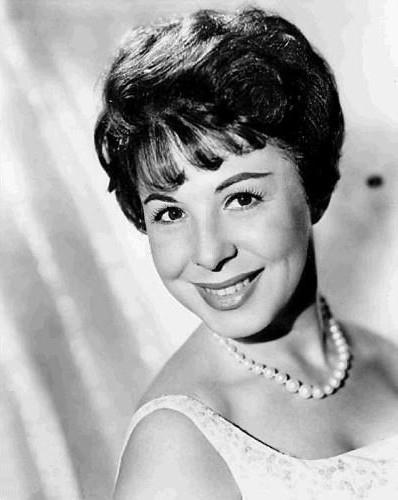
Eydie Gormé American singer

Classic pop declined in popularity as Rock and roll entered the mainstream and became a major force in American record sales. Crooners such as Eddie Fisher, Perry Como, and Patti Page, who had dominated the first half of the decade, found their access to the pop charts significantly curtailed by the decade's end. However, new Pop vocalists continued to rise to prominence throughout the decade, many of whom started out singing Rock 'n' Roll. These include: Pat Boone ("Don’t Forbid Me", "April Love", "Love Letters in the Sand"), Anita Bryant ("Till There Was You", "Paper Roses"), Connie Francis ("Who’s Sorry Now", "Among My Souvenirs", "My Happiness"), Gogi Grant ("Suddenly There’s a Valley", "The Wayward Wind"), Bobby Darin ("Dream Lover", "Beyond the Sea", "Mack the Knife"), and Andy Williams ("Canadian Sunset", "Butterfly", "Hawaiian Wedding Song"). Even Rock 'n' Roll icon Elvis Presley spent the rest of his career alternating between Pop and Rock ("Love Me Tender", "Loving You", "I Love You Because"). Pop would resurface on the charts in the mid-1960s as "Adult Contemporary".

=== R&B ===
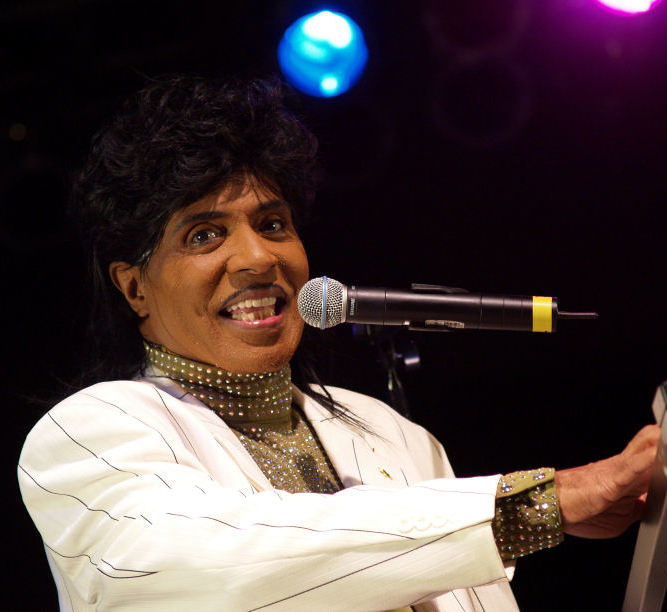
Little Richard

In 1951, Little Richard Penniman began recording for RCA Records in the late-1940s jump blues style of Joe Brown and Billy Wright. However, it wasn't until he prepared a demo in 1954, that caught the attention of Specialty Records, that the world would start to hear his new, uptempo, funky rhythm and blues that would catapult him to fame in 1955 and help define the sound of rock and roll. A rapid succession of rhythm-and-blues hits followed, beginning with "Tutti Frutti" and "Long Tall Sally", which would influence performers such as James Brown, Elvis Presley, and Otis Redding.

At the urging of Leonard Chess at Chess Records, Chuck Berry had reworked a country fiddle tune with a long history, entitled "Ida Red". The resulting "Maybellene" was not only a #3 hit on the R&B charts in 1955, but also reached into the top 30 on the pop charts.

Stax Records was founded in 1957 as Satellite Records. The label was a major factor in the creation of the Southern soul and Memphis soul styles.

In 1959, two black-owned record labels, one of which would become hugely successful, made their debut: Sam Cooke's Sar, and Berry Gordy's Motown Records.

=== Blues ===
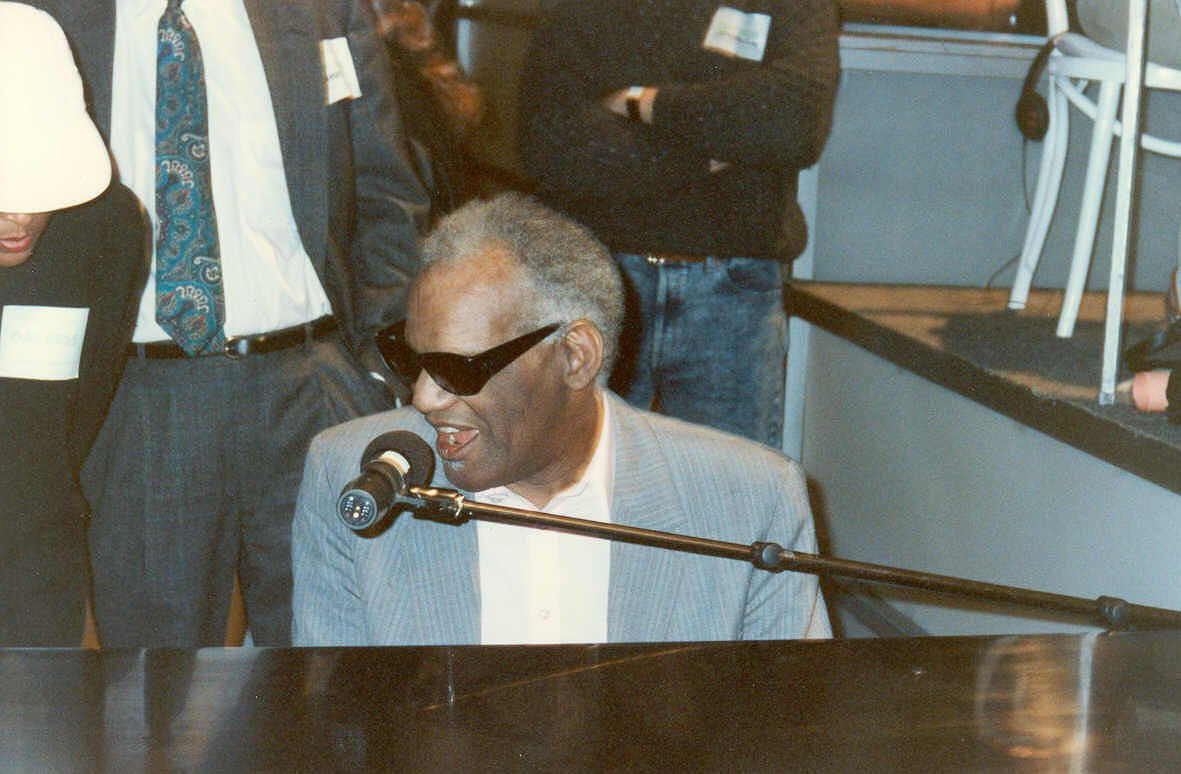
Ray Charles

Blues had a huge influence on mainstream American popular music in the 1950s with the enthusiastic playing styles of popular musicians like Bo Diddley and Chuck Berry, departed from the melancholy aspects of blues and influenced Rock and roll music.

Ray Charles and Fats Domino help bring blues into the popular music scene. Domino provides a boogie-woogie style that heavily influences rock 'n' roll.

Big Mama Thornton records the original version of "Hound Dog".

=== Country music ===
Country music stars in the early 1950s included Hank Williams, Patsy Cline, Bill Monroe, Eddy Arnold, Gene Autry, Tex Ritter, Jim Reeves, Tennessee Ernie Ford, Chet Atkins and Kitty Wells.

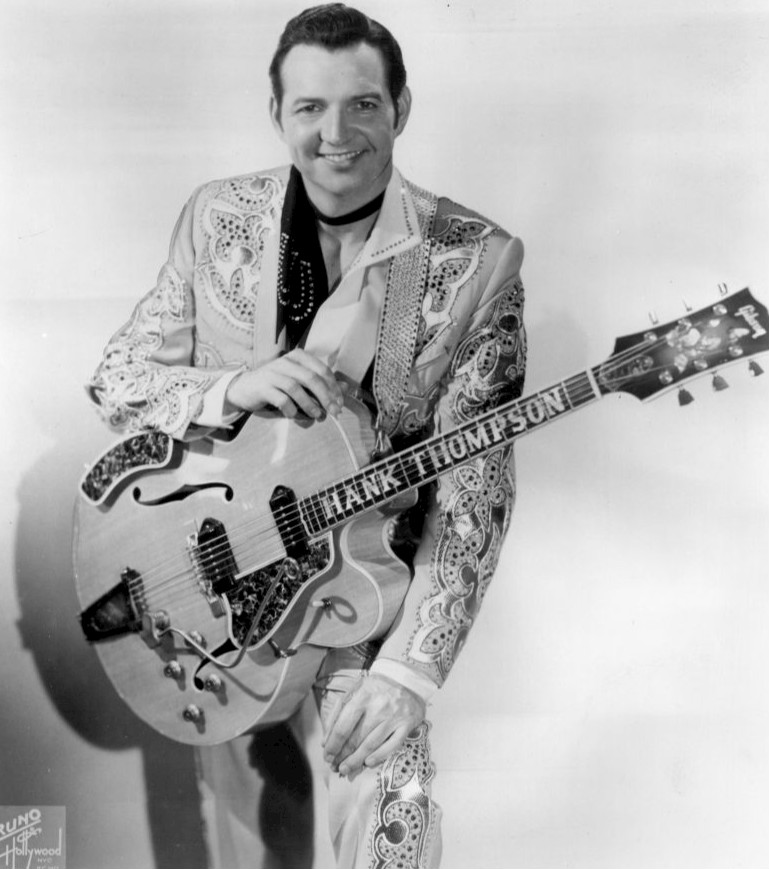
Hank Thompson

Wells' 1952 hit "It Wasn't God Who Made Honky Tonk Angels" became the first single by a solo female artist to top the U.S. country charts. "It Wasn't God ... " was a landmark single in several ways; it began a trend of "answer" songs, or songs written and recorded in response to (or to counterpoint) a previously popular song – in this case, "The Wild Side of Life" by Hank Thompson – and for Wells, began a trend of female singers who defied the typical stereotype of being submissive to men and putting up with their oft-infidel ways, both in their personal lives and in their songs.

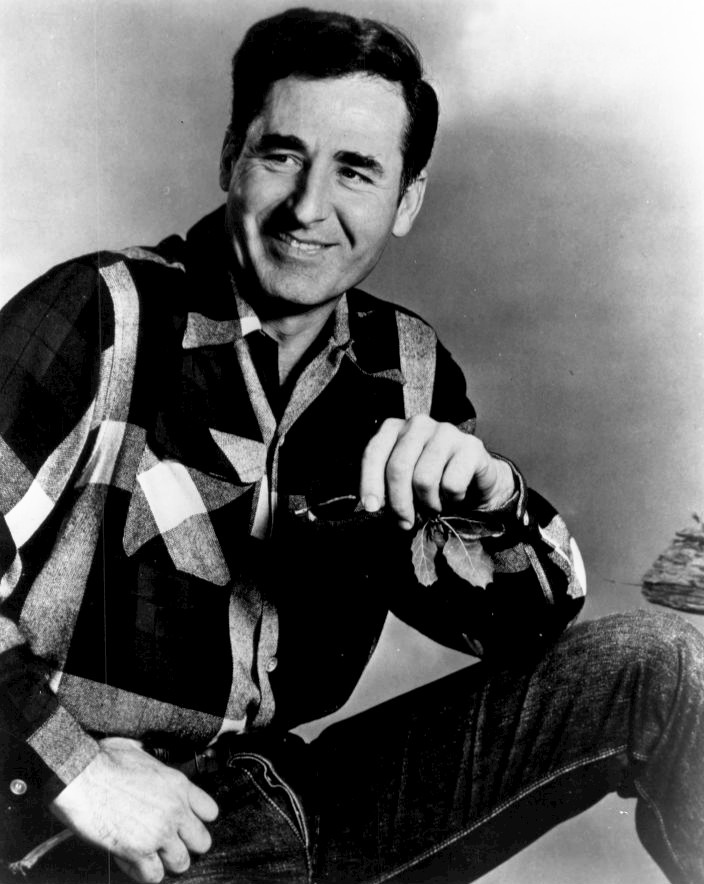
Sheb Wooley recorded a series of novelty songs including the 1958 novelty song "The Purple People Eater"

Early in the decade, the honky-tonk style dominated country music, with songs of heartbreak, loneliness, alcoholism and despair the overriding themes. Long regarded the master of these themes was Hank Williams, whose critically acclaimed songwriting resulted in a string of legendary hits and songs, such as "Cold, Cold Heart", "Your Cheating Heart", "Why Don't You Love Me" and many more titles. Williams also lived hard, and on 1 January 1953, died. His legacy, however, would live on in country music for decades to come, and be vastly influential to new stars including a young Saratoga, Texas native named George Jones.

Jones, just 23 when he had his first national hit – "Why Baby Why" – would go on to become one of country music's most iconic figures for the next 55-plus years. Although some of his early songs included rockabilly (usually recorded under the pseudonym Thumper Jones), he stayed true to the honky-tonk style for most of his career. In addition to "Why Baby Why," his biggest 1950s hits included "What Am I Worth", "Treasure of Love", "Just One More" and his first No. 1 hit, "White Lightning", and by the end of the 1990s, that number would increase to more than 100 hit songs.

Besides Williams and Jones, the most popular honky tonk-styled singers included Lefty Frizzell, Carl Smith and Webb Pierce.

In 1955, Ozark Jubilee began a nearly six-year run on ABC-TV, the first national TV show to feature country's biggest stars.

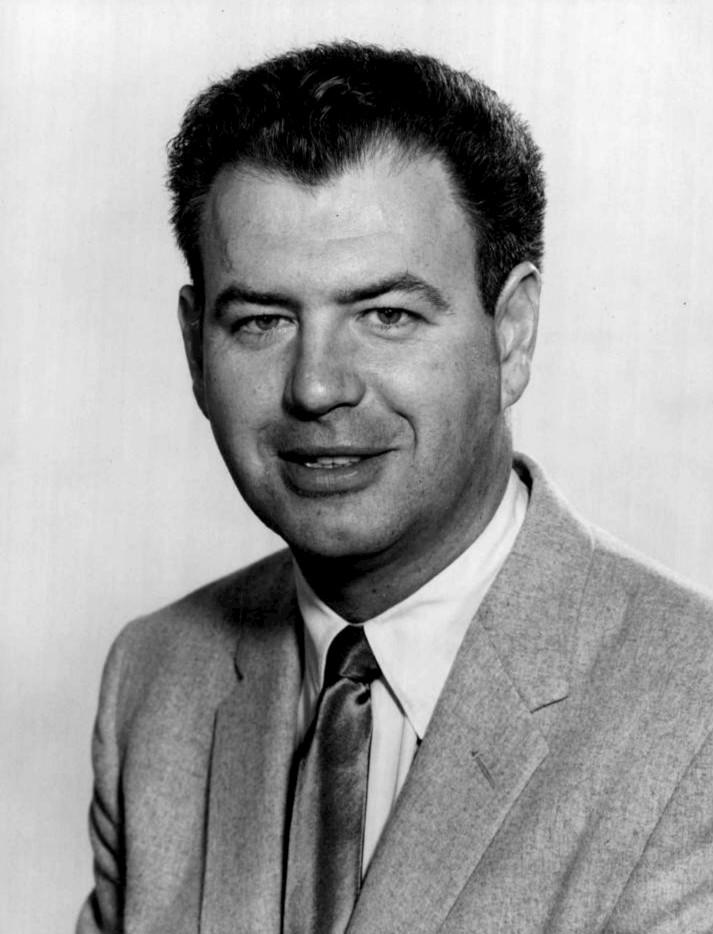
Nelson Riddle and His Orchestra rerelease "Deguello" De guello (No Quarter) written by Dimitri Tiomkin.

By the late 1950s, the Nashville sound became country music's response to continued encroachment of genre by rock artists. This new style emphasized string sections, background vocals and crooning lead vocals in the vein of mainstream popular music, but utilizing production styles and themes seen in country music. Artists like Eddy Arnold and Jim Reeves, both who had been well established earlier in the decade, were early pioneers in this style, which went on to see its greatest success in the 1960s. One of the first major Nashville Sound hits was "Oh, Lonesome Me" by Don Gibson. Also popular was the "saga song", often a song with a historical background or having themes of violence, adultery and so forth. Songs by artists such as Johnny Horton ("The Battle of New Orleans" and "When It's Springtime in Alaska"), Stonewall Jackson ("Waterloo"), Marty Robbins ("El Paso") and Lefty Frizzell ("Long Black Veil") dominated the charts starting in 1959 and continuing into the early 1960s.

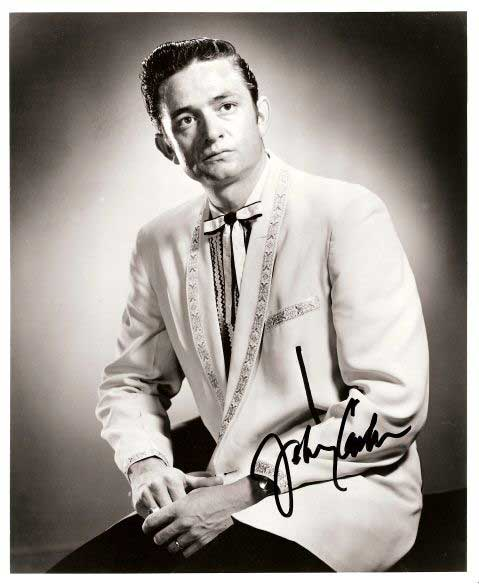
Johnny Cash became one of the most popular country music artists during the 1950s.

The late 1950s saw the emergence of the Lubbock sound, but by the end of the decade, backlash as well as traditional country music artists such as Ray Price, Marty Robbins, and Johnny Horton began to shift the industry away from the rock n' roll influences of the mid-1950s.

Rockabilly emerged in the early 1950s as a fusion of rock and roll and country music. Rockabilly was most popular with country fans in the 1950s. The music was propelled by catchy beats, an electric guitar and an acoustic bass which was played using the slap-back technique. Rockabilly is generally considered to have begun in the early 1950s, when musicians like Bill Haley began mixing jump blues and electric country. In 1954, however, Elvis Presley truly began the popularization of the genre with a series of recordings for Sun Records. "Rock Around the Clock" (1955, Bill Haley) was the breakthrough success for the style, and it launched the careers of several rockabilly entertainers.

During this period Elvis Presley converted over to country music. He played a huge role in the music industry during this time. The number two, three and four songs on Billboard's charts for that year were Elvis Presley, "Heartbreak Hotel;" Johnny Cash, "I Walk the Line;" and Carl Perkins, "Blue Suede Shoes". Cash and Presley placed songs in the top 5 in 1958 with No. 3 "Guess Things Happen That Way/Come In, Stranger" by Cash, and No. 5 by Presley "Don't/I Beg of You". Presley acknowledged the influence of rhythm and blues artists and his style, saying "The coloured folk been singin' and playin' it just the way I'm doin' it now, man for more years than I know." By 1958, many rockabilly musicians returned to a more mainstream style or had defined their own unique style and rockabilly had largely disappeared from popular music, although its influences would remain into the future.

=== Jazz ===
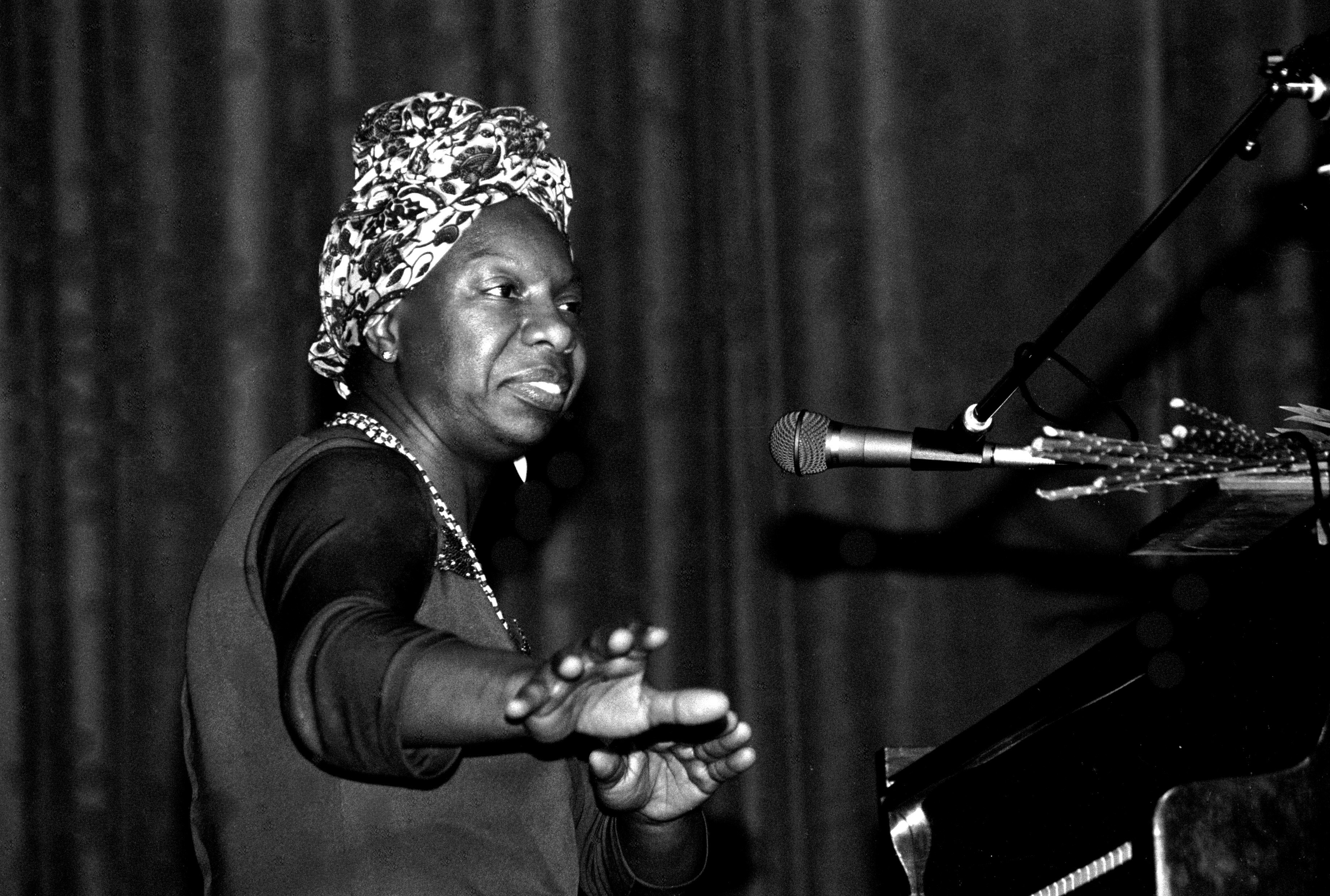
Nina Simone

Bebop, Hard bop, Cool jazz and the Blues gained popularity during the 1950s while prominent Jazz musicians who came into prominence in these genres included Lester Young, Ben Webster, Charlie Parker, Dizzy Gillespie, Miles Davis, John Coltrane, Thelonious Monk, Charles Mingus, Art Tatum, Bill Evans, Ahmad Jamal, Oscar Peterson, Gil Evans, Gerry Mulligan, Cannonball Adderley, Stan Getz, Chet Baker, Dave Brubeck, Art Blakey, Max Roach, the Miles Davis Quintet, the Modern Jazz Quartet, Ella Fitzgerald, Ray Charles, Sarah Vaughan, Dinah Washington, Nina Simone, and Billie Holiday.

=== Other trends ===
In 1956 the American musician of Jamaican descent Harry Belafonte popularized the Calypso music Caribbean musical style which became a worldwide craze with the release of his rendition traditional Jamaican folk song "Banana Boat Song" from his 1956 album Calypso. The album later became the first full-length record to sell more than a million copies, and Belafonte was dubbed the "King of Calypso".

=== Folk music ===
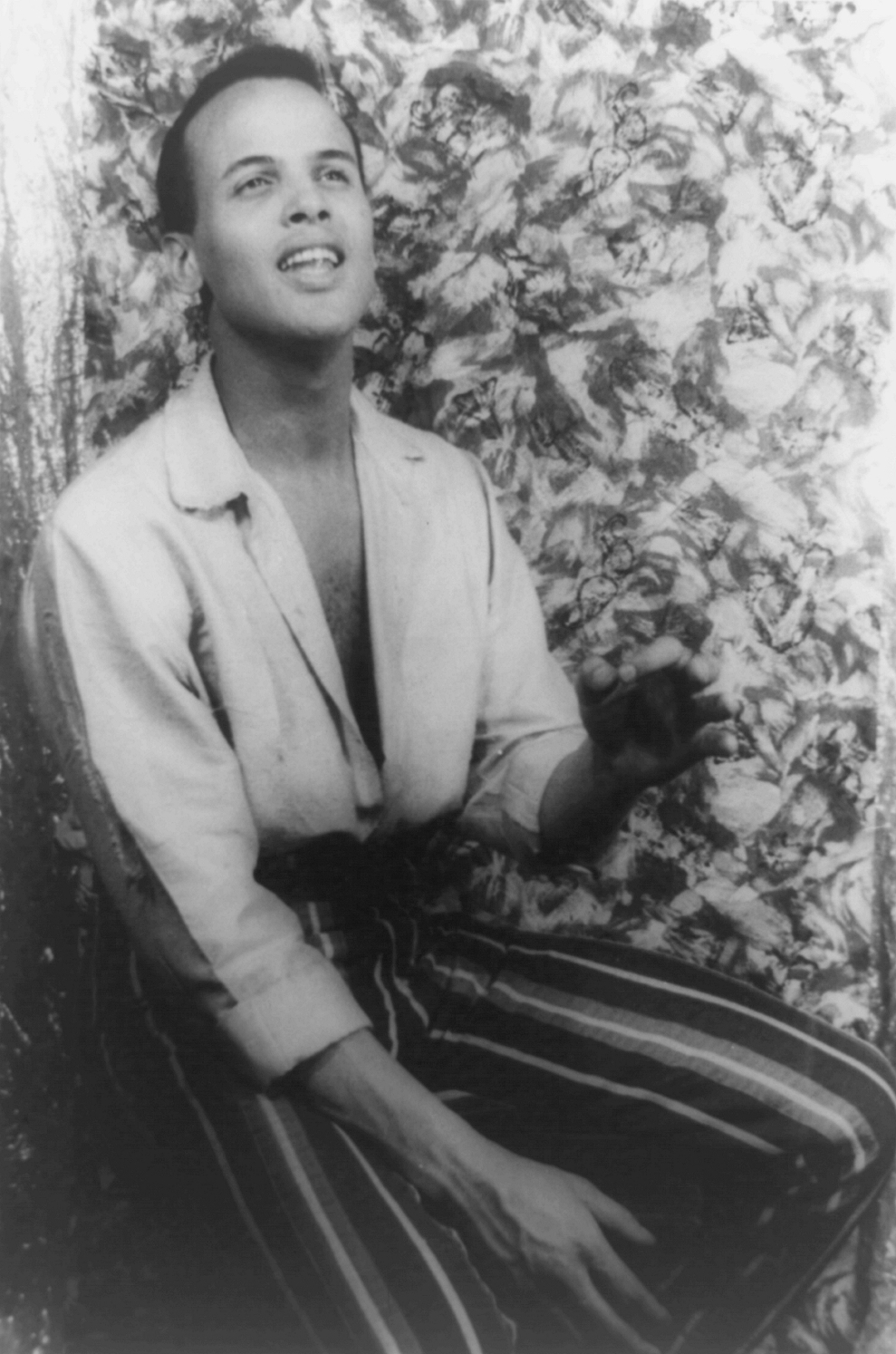
Harry Belafonte, 1954

The Weavers, Pete Seeger, Woody Guthrie, The Kingston Trio, Odetta, and several other performers were instrumental in launching the folk music revival of the 1950s and 1960s.

== Europe ==
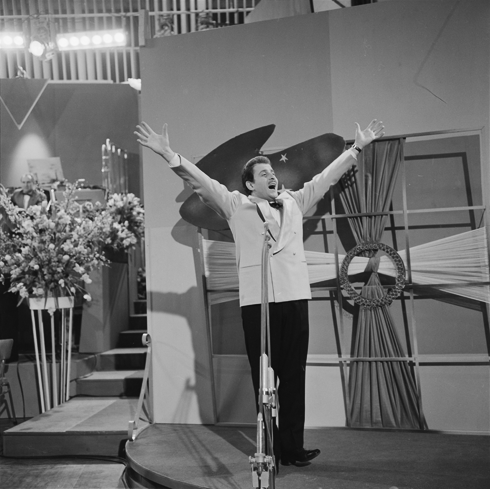
Domenico Modugno at the Eurovision Song Contest 1958, singing "Nel blu dipinto di blu"

During the 1950s, European popular music give way to the influence of American forms of music including jazz, swing and traditional pop, mediated through film and records. The significant change of the mid-1950s was the impact of American rock and roll, which provided a new model for performance and recording, based on a youth market. Initially this was dominated by American acts, or re-creations of American forms of music, but soon distinctly European Bands and individual artists began in early attempts to produce local Rock and roll music.

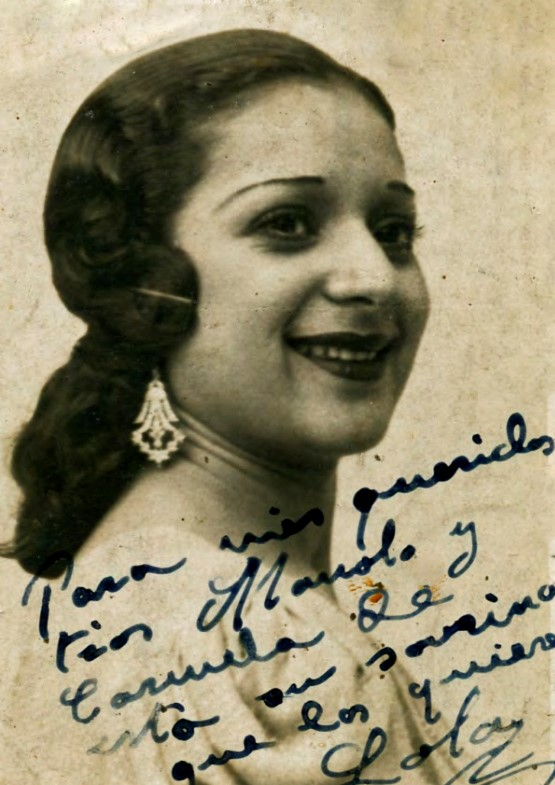
Lola Flores known for her overwhelming personality onstage

The European Broadcasting Union started the Eurovision Song Contest in 1956, a song contest to unite war-torn Europe. Seven countries participated in the first contest in Lugano, Switzerland. This contest generally introduced local stars or stars-to-be wider, not only singers but also other people in music as well. Some of these people include Franck Pourcel, Dolf van der Linden and Kai Mortensen in the 1950s. Ballad is the most common genre at that time. Two veterans won in the first two years, Lys Assia who is the only Swiss citizen to win and Dutchwoman Corry Brokken. The most famous singer and song in the decade was the Italian entry in 1958. Domenico Modugno with Grammy-winning song commonly called Volare. Italy finished third to Andre Claveau, representing France. Beating Brokken in the national final, Teddy Scholten won its second victory for the Netherlands in 1959. Her song is the only non-ballad winner in the first nine years of the grand prix. Willy van Hemert co-written both Dutch winning songs.

=== France ===
During this decade, the Chanson Française genre dominated the French music market. Songs with lyrics, based on a classical structure (verses, choruses), still relatively uninfluenced by rock, but above all by musette, and already largely influenced by jazz. The French song of the 1950s gave a large place to the voice and the text, sometimes committed, the instruments being only secondary. Among the best-selling artists of the time were Edith Piaf, Georges Brassens, Charles Trenet, Léo Ferret and Yves Montand, Dalida and Barbara.

== Latin America ==
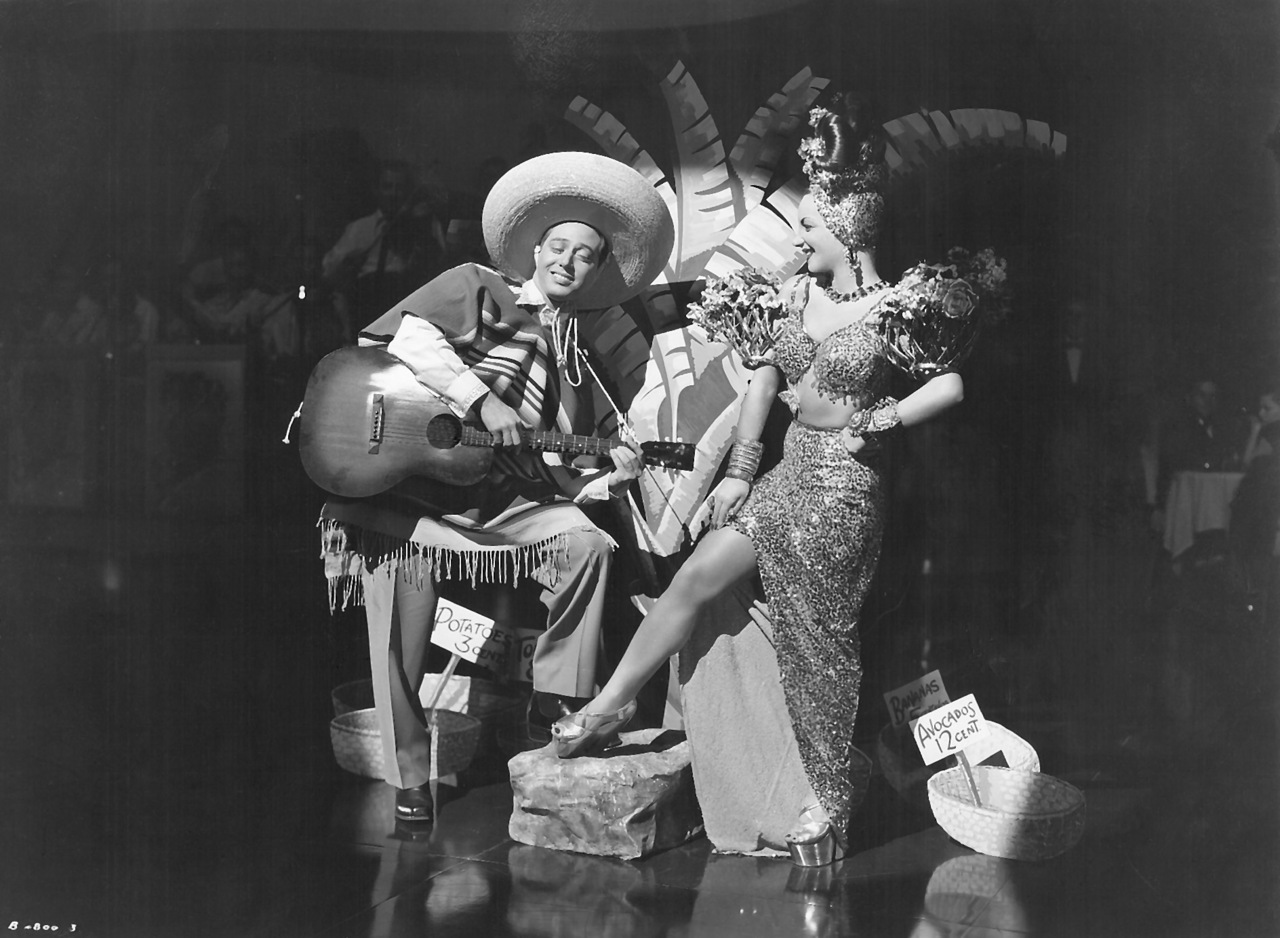
Andy Russell

- Andy Russell in 1954, relocated to Mexico where he became a star of radio, television, motion pictures, records and nightclubs.
- In 1958 the American musician Ritchie Valens's "La Bamba" popularized Spanish language rock music throughout Latin America.
- In 1958 Daniel Flores, who some call the "godfather of Latin Rock", performed his hit song "Tequila".
- *Pedro Infante was a Mexican actor and singer. Hailed as one of the greatest actors of the Golden Age of Mexican cinema, he is considered an idol in Mexico and Latin American countries.

Other famous mariachi performers include José Alfredo Jiménez, Javier Solís, Miguel Aceves Mejía, Lola Beltrán, Antonio Aguilar, Flor Silvestre, Lucha Villa

- Argentinian band Los Cinco Latinos released their first album Maravilloso Maravilloso, which was met with success in Latin America and the United States.

Hispanics, young and old, could find comfort in the popular rhythmic sounds of Latin music that reminded them of home; mambo, cha-cha, merengue and salsa. Tito Puente, an American born Boricua (Puerto Rican), revolutionized the Latin music of the time. He incorporated many new percussion and woodwind instruments into the popular Latin sound. The Hispanics in the U.S. certainly were able to conform with the popular vibes.

In Brazil, Bossa Nova was created in the city of Rio de Janeiro.

== Oceania ==
By the end of the decade, as the rock and roll style had spread throughout the world, it soon caught on with Australian teens. Johnny O'Keefe became perhaps the first modern rock star of the country, and began the field of rock music in Australia.

New Zealand was introduced to Rock and roll by Johnny Cooper's cover of "Rock Around the Clock".

After Rock and roll had been introduced, the most famous of New Zealand's cover artists were: Johnny Devlin, Max Merit and the Meteors, Ray Columbus & the Invaders and Dinah Lee.

== See also ==
- 1940s in music
- 1960s in music
- 1970s in music
- 1980s in music
- 1990s in music
- List of musicians of the 1950s
