= Lawrence Welk's Baby Elephant Walk and Theme from the Brothers Grimm =

Studio album by Lawrence Welk
- Released: 1962
- Genre: Easy listening
- Label: Dot

Lawrence Welk's Baby Elephant Walk and Theme from the Brothers Grimm is an album by Lawrence Welk. It was released in 1962 on the Dot label (catalog no. DLP-3457). The album debuted on Billboard magazine's popular albums chart on September 29, 1962, reached the No. 9 spot, and remained on that chart for 10 weeks

== Track listing ==
Side 1

1. "Baby Elephant Walk" (Henry Mancini) [2:12]
2. "Are You Lonesome Tonight" (Roy Turk, Lou Handman) [2:25]
3. "Love Me Tender" (Elvis Presley, Vera Matson) [2:18]
4. "Gigi" (Alan Jay Lerner, Frederick Loewe) [2:41]
5. "It's All in the Game" (Carl Sigman, Charles G. Dawes) [2:29]
6. "Pretend" (Lew Douglas, Cliff Parman, Frank La Vere, Dan Belloc) [2:11

Side 2

1. "Theme from the Brothers Grimm" (Bob Merrill) [2:04]
2. "Three Coins in the Fountain" (Sammy Cahn, Jule Styne) [2:10]
3. "Mona Lisa" (Jay Livingston, Ray Evans) [2:05]
4. "It's Not For Me to Say" (Al Stillman, Robert Allen) [2:01}
5. "Vaya con Dios" (Larry Russell, Inez James, Buddy Pepper) [2:22]
6. "Because of You" (Arthur Hammerstein, Dudley Wilkinson) [2:23]
