= I Need You Now (1954 song) =

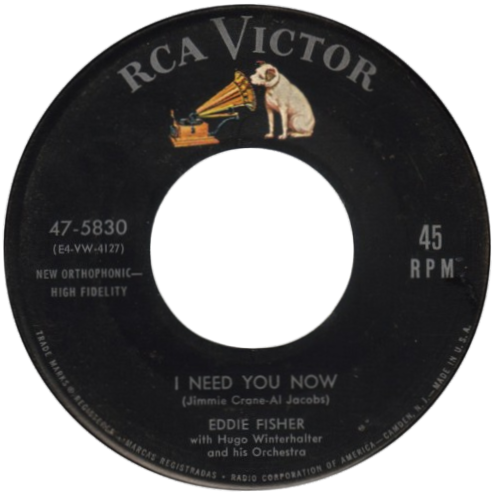

Single by Eddie Fisher
- Written: 1953
- Released: August 1954
- Recorded: 1954
- Length: 2:26
- Label: RCA Victor
- Songwriters: Al Jacobs and Jimmie Crane

Eddie Fisher singles chronology
"My Friend" (1954)	"I Need You Now" (1954)	"Count Your Blessings (Instead of Sheep)" (1954)

"I Need You Now" is a popular song written by Jimmie Crane and Al Jacobs. The recorded version by Eddie Fisher in 1954 reached number 1 on Billboard charts in 1954. Six years later Joni James reached the charts with her recording as well.

== Background ==
The song was written for Joni James who recorded the song in April 1953 for M-G-M Records, and it was released on her best-selling album, Let There Be Love. Eddie Fisher subsequently recorded it accompanied by Hugo Winterhalter and his Orchestra at Webster Hall, New York City, on May 4, 1954. The song was released by RCA Victor Records backed with "Heaven Was Never Like This" (catalog number 20-5830) in August 1954. and by EMI on the His Master's Voice label as catalog number B 10755. Fisher's recording reached number 1 on Billboard as well as Cash Box charts in November 1954. It was ranked number 13 on Billboard's 1954's Top Popular Records according to records sales, and number 12 according to disk jockey plays.

Because M-G-M had already had three major songs scheduled in sequence for release ("My Love, My Love" and "I'll Never Stand in Your Way" and "I Need You Now," all done at the same recording session) when the Fisher version was released, it was not possible for M-G-M to market the James original at that point. Seven years later, Joni James recorded a new version of "I Need You Now", at Abbey Road Studios in London. It was released as a single in 1960, reaching number 98 nationally in March of that year. Jacobs and Crane later gave James another song "My Believing Heart," which became the follow-up to her million selling "You Are My Love."

== Charts ==
Chart peaks for "I Need You Now" by Fisher
Chart (1954)	Peak position
UK Singles (Official Charts)	13
US Best Sellers in Stores (Billboard)	1
US Best-Selling Singles (Cashbox)	1

== Other versions ==
- Jerry Lee Lewis recorded it as a demo in 1954.
- Russell Arms performed it on several 1954 episodes of the popular TV series Your Hit Parade. A kinescope of one of these performances survives and can be viewed online.
- Floyd Cramer included the song on his album Last Date (1960).
- Bing Crosby recorded it in 1954 for use on his radio show and it was subsequently included in the box set The Bing Crosby CBS Radio Recordings (1954-56) issued by Mosaic Records (catalog MD7-245) in 2009.
- Ronnie Dove reached number 93 on the Hot 100 in 1969 with his version. It was his last entry on that chart.
- Hank Locklin, in 1962
- Les Paul and Mary Ford, on their EP release for Capitol Records Les Paul and Mary Ford (1954).
