= Love Songs (Nat King Cole album) =

Compilation album by Nat King Cole
- Released: February 3, 2003
- Recorded: 1953–1964
- Genres: Pop, jazz
- Length: 72:27
- Label: Capitol
- Producer: Lee Gillette

Professional ratings
Review scores
Source	Rating
Allmusic	3/5 stars

Love Songs brings together tracks from throughout Nat "King" Cole's recording career with Capitol records. The swing pianist turned ballad vocalist had a prolific chart run in the 1950s. Six of his UK hits are featured here.

== Track listing ==
1. "When I Fall in Love" (Victor Young, Edward Heyman) – 3:11
2. "Unforgettable" (Irving Gordon) – 3:28
3. "The Very Thought of You" (Ray Noble) – 3:48
4. "Too Young" (Sidney Lippman, Sylvia Dee) – 3:25
5. "Let's Fall in Love" (Harold Arlen, Ted Koehler) – 2:47
6. "The More I See You" (Harry Warren, Mack Gordon) – 3:28
7. "Stay As Sweet As You Are" (Mack Gordon, Harry Revel) – 2:58
8. "Love Is a Many-Splendored Thing" (Sammy Fain, Paul Francis Webster) – 2:40
9. "Walkin' My Baby Back Home" (Gordon, Revel) - 2:40
10. "You're My Everything" (Mort Dixon, Warren, Young) – 2:49
11. "Because You're Mine" (Nicholas Brodzsky, Sammy Cahn) – 3:13
12. "Around the World" (Harold Adamson, Victor Young) – 2:33
13. "A Nightingale Sang in Berkeley Square" (Eric Maschwitz, Manning Sherwin, Jack Strachey) – 4:44
14. "It's All in the Game" (Charles Dawes, Carl Sigman) – 3:06
15. "You Made Me Love You" (James V. Monaco, Joseph McCarthy) – 2:55
16. "For All We Know" (J. Fred Coots, Sam M. Lewis) - 3:16 (Nat King Cole Trio)
17. "There Goes My Heart" (Benny Davis, Abner Silver) – 2:52
18. "Love Letters" (Victor Young, Edward Heyman) – 2:43
19. "Answer Me" (Gerhard Winkler, Fred Rauch, Carl Sigman) – 2:56
20. "Orange Colored Sky" (Warren, Gordon) – 2:33
21. "Stardust" (Hoagy Carmichael, Mitchell Parish) – 3:15
22. "Autumn Leaves" (Joseph Kosma, Jacques Prévert, Johnny Mercer) – 2:40
23. "These Foolish Things" (Harry Link, Holt Marvell, Jack Strachey) – 3:46
24. "You'll Never Know" (Warren, Gordon) – 2:42
25. "Let There Be Love" (Lionel Rand, Ian Grant) – 2:45 (Nat King Cole & George Shearing Quintet)
26. "More" (Riz Ortolani, Nino Oliviero, Marcello Diociolini, Norman Newell) – 2:07
27. "L-O-V-E" (Gordon, Revel) – 2:31
28. "I Wish You Love" (Warren, Gordon) – 2:54

== Personnel ==
- Nat King Cole – vocals
- Les Baxter – arranger
- Ralph Carmichael – arranger, conductor
- Lee Gillette – producer
- Gordon Jenkins – arranger, conductor
- Bob Norberg – digital remastering
- Nelson Riddle – arranger, conductor

== Certifications ==
Certifications and sales for Love Songs
Region	Certification	Certified units/sales
United Kingdom (BPI)	Silver	60,000^{^}
^{^} Shipments figures based on certification alone.
