= You're Nearer =

Song
- Language: English
- Composer: Richard Rodgers
- Lyricist: Lorenz Hart

"You're Nearer" is an American popular song by composer Richard Rodgers and lyricist Lorenz Hart (Rodgers and Hart) from the 1940 film version of the Broadway musical Too Many Girls. It was not in the original Broadway show but was written especially for the movie and copyrighted on August 29, 1940. In the film, it was sung by Lucille Ball (dubbed by Trudy Erwin) and also by Frances Langford with Ann Miller, Libby Bennett and Lucille Ball (again dubbed by Trudy Erwin).

Plans to include the song in the 1948 feature Words and Music with a recording by Perry Como was ultimately cut from the film. Como's version eventually appeared amongst the outtakes included on a 2007 DVD release.

The song has been recorded by a plethora of artists.

== Selected covers ==
- Frances Langford - recorded on July 30, 1940 for Decca Records (catalog No. 3400A).
- Joni James - Let There Be Love (1953)
- Jeri Southern - Southern Hospitality (1958)
- Steve Lawrence - a single release in 1959.
- Shirley Bassey - Shirley Bassey (1961)
- Judy Garland - versions of the song appear on the albums Judy at Carnegie Hall (1961) and The Judy Garland Show: The Show That Got Away (2002).
- June Christy - The Intimate Miss Christy (1963)
- Perry Como - Look to Your Heart (1968) and Today (1987)
- Tony Bennett -- Together Again (1977)
- Rufus Wainwright - Rufus Does Judy at Carnegie Hall (2007).

== See also ==
- Rodgers and Hammerstein
