= 100 Strings and Joni =

Studio album by Joni James
- Released: May 2, 1959
- Recorded: January 1959
- Studios: EMI, London
- Genres: Traditional pop; symphonic pop
- Length: 43:50
- Label: MGM
- Producer: Acquaviva

Joni James chronology
Joni Sings Irish Favo(u)rites (1959)	100 Strings and Joni (1959)	Joni at Carnegie Hall (1959)

100 Strings and Joni is a studio album by the American traditional pop singer Joni James, released on May 2, 1959 by MGM Records. Recorded at EMI Recording Studios, Abbey Road, the album utilizes a 100-piece symphony orchestra and was produced by Tony Acquaviva (credited under the mononym Acquaviva), James' husband, manager and conductor. British composers Tony Osbourne and Geoff Love arranged the album's twelve tracks and the album was recorded with assistance from EMI A&R manager Norman Newell. A commercial success upon release, the album initiated a series of "100 Strings" albums for James.

== Recording ==
James' husband and manager Tony Acquaviva formulated the idea of backing the singer with a 100-piece orchestra, but initially found MGM reluctant. The project came to fruition in January 1959 during James' first tour of Great Britain, following a successful appearance on ATV's Sunday Night at the London Palladium. The album was initially reported to be titled 100 Men and a Girl and recording began at EMI Recording Studios, Abbey Road on 17 January 1959. Utilising the facilities at the studios and aided by the prolific British arrangers Tony Osbourne and Geoff Love as well as British musicians and technicians including A&R man Norman Newell, the project was achieved at a fraction of the expenditure it would have cost stateside. James considered the orchestra in the room to be "one of the most beautiful sounds I ever heard". The album consists of arrangements of standards from the Great American Songbook recorded under the musical supervision of Acquaviva.

== Release ==
The album was issued on May 2, 1959, rush released to coincide with James' debut concert at Carnegie Hall, also titled "100 Strings and Joni", which took place on May 3, 1959. Backed by Arturo Toscanini's Symphony of the Air, the concert made James among the first pop singers to perform a solo concert at the venue. (Note: The concert itself was later issued as a live album, Joni at Carnegie Hall.) The event's opulent setup, unusual for a pop singer, led to speculation about its cost in the music press. MGM, who considered James their "album queen" commercially, strongly promoted 100 Strings, with window displays in over two-hundred New York record stores. Issued in a gatefold sleeve and advertised as a "deluxe album", the album was available in stereo and monaural and its tracks were issued over three volumes of mono EPs. According to James' liner notes, the first copy of the album was sent to Princess Margaret, then aged nineteen and "a great record fan".

The album was issued on CD in 2002 by Collectors' Choice Music.

== Critical reception ==
Professional ratings
Review scores
Source	Rating
AllMusic	4/5 stars

Upon release, Cash Box assessed the album positively, singling out James' "tenderly" vocals and "the lush velvet backdrops by the orchestra". They concluded "her many fans will regard this as representative of her best work to date". Billboard praised "Acquaviva's lush backing behind the thrush's distinctive piping". In a retrospective review, Lindsay Planer of AllMusic commented "the blend of warm and vibrant acoustics at Abbey Road as well as the fresh scores of timeless material give James an inviting sonic canvas that she and the assembled musicians impeccably utilize". Planer noted "James delicately balances an authoritative intonation with tasteful restraint and the purity of innocence" and praised "Imagination", "But Beautiful" and "Hi Lili, Hi Lo" as "a few of the more exquisite and accomplished performances", but added "it is admittedly difficult to find fault with any of them".

== Aftermath and legacy ==
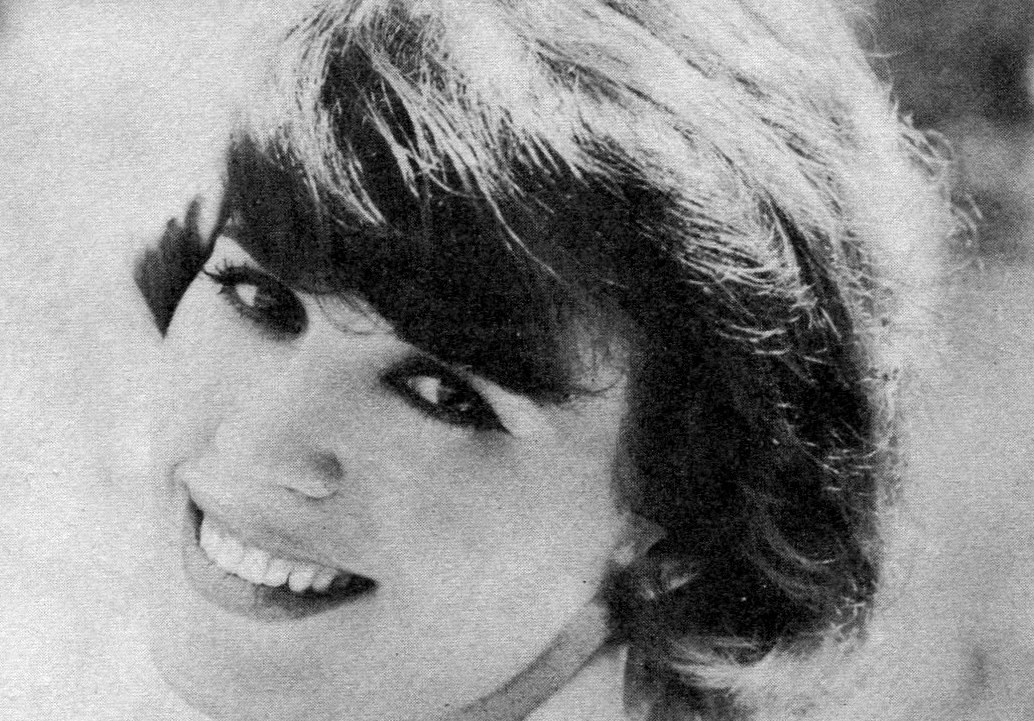
James in 1962

Following the album's release, James was presented with a gold plaque reading "many thanks to Joni James who has sold one million albums since joining MGM Records". James toured extensively with the full orchestra over 1959 and 1960. Her two-week residency at Los Angeles's Cocoanut Grove in June and July 1960 was described as "one of the biggest orchestral complements ever to appear in a single night club offering". On December 20, 1959, James arrived in Britain with plans to record several "100 Strings" albums in the country. The first of these, I'm in the Mood for Love, was issued in May 1960. The album was launched at the British Trade Show at New York Coliseum, where it was played on British equipment in a "typical comfortable living room setting" designed by Lord & Taylor. Another follow-up album, 100 Strings and Joni in Hollywood, was announced by MGM at their Puerto Rico distribution meeting in July 1960. It was released simultaneously with 100 Strings and Joni on Broadway in August 1960. An album of religious songs for the holiday season, 100 Voices, 10 Strings & Joni James, followed in December.

The album was included in Jody Rosen's "60 Great Albums You Probably Haven't Heard" article for Vulture. Rosen praised James' "subtle" vocal performances and commented "there are symphonic pop albums—and then there's 100 Strings and Joni".

== Track listing ==
Side one

1. "My Heart Tells Me" (Harry Warren, Mack Gordon) – 3:29
2. "Imagination" (Johnny Burke, Jimmy Van Heusen) – 4:57
3. "All Through the Day" (Oscar Hammerstein II, Jerome Kern) – 2:44
4. "Too Young" (Sid Lippman, Sylvia Dee) – 3:32
5. "It Never Entered My Mind" (Richard Rodgers, Lorenz Hart) – 3:19
6. "Body and Soul" (Johnny Green, Edward Heyman, Robert Sour and Frank Eyton) – 3:57

Side two

7. "I Can Dream, Can't I?" (Sammy Fain, Irving Kahal) – 3:33
8. "Hi Lili, Hi Lo" (Bronislau Kaper, Helen Deutsch) – 3:10
9. "But Beautiful" (Burke, Van Heusen) – 3:38
10. "Wait and See" (Warren, Johnny Mercer) – 4:17
11. "It Could Happen to You" (Burke, Van Heusen) – 3:35
12. "Maybe You'll Be There" (Rube Bloom, Sammy Gallop) – 3:52
