= The Duprees =

American doo wop group

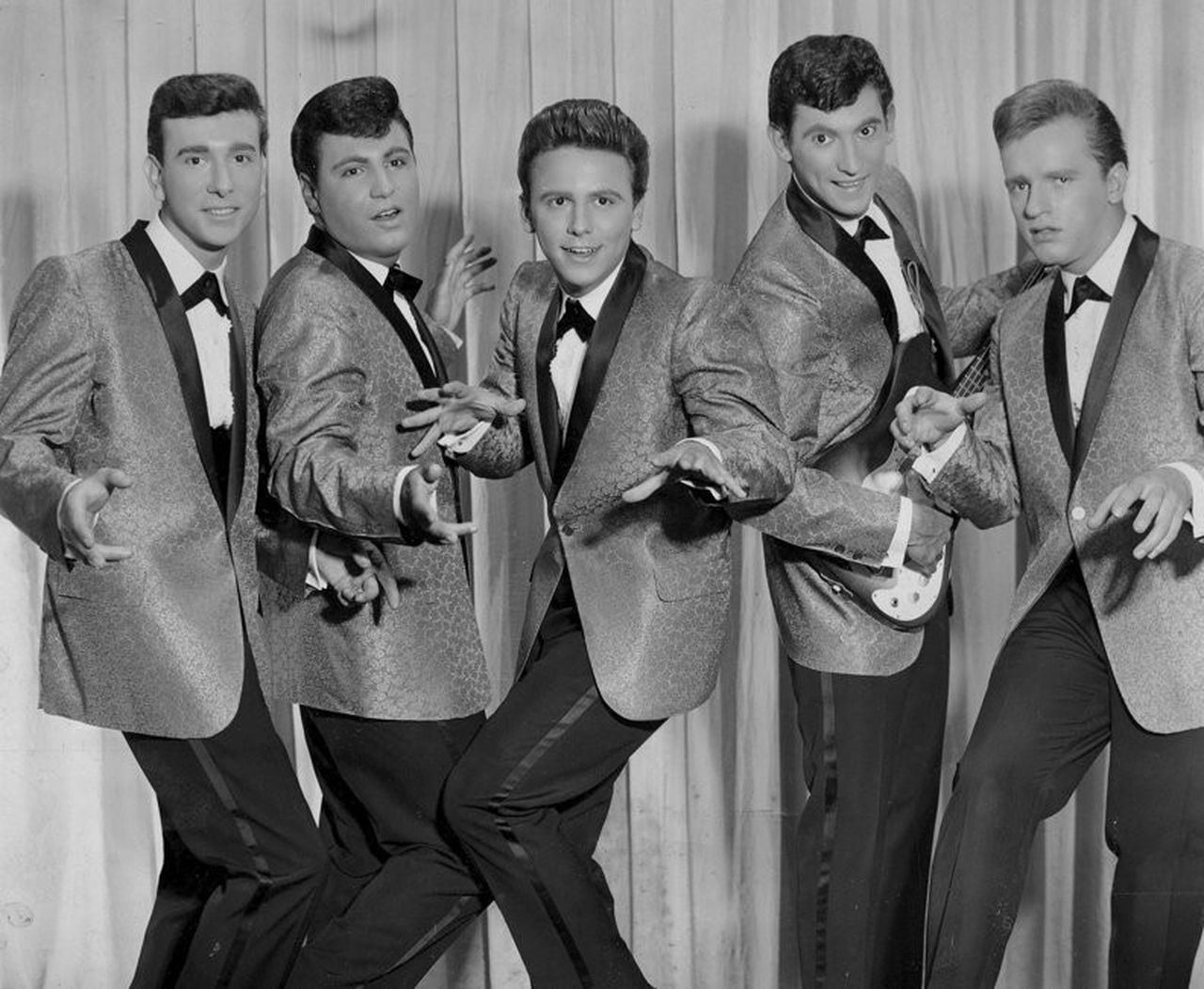
The Original Duprees c.1962 (L to R), John Salvato, Michael Arnone, Joey Canzano, Joseph Santollo and Thomas Bialoglow.

The Duprees are an American musical group of doo-wop style who had a series of top-ten singles in the early 1960s. Their highest-charting single, "You Belong to Me" reached No. 7 on the Billboard Hot 100 in 1962. In 1970, they recorded as The Italian Asphalt & Pavement Company.

== History ==
=== Foundation ===
The group was founded in the early 1960s in Jersey City, New Jersey, by William L. Dickinson High School students Michael Arnone, Joe Santollo, John Salvato, Tom Bialoglow and lead singer Joey Canzano (later known as Joey Vann).

Originally Bialoglow and Canzano were singing with a local group, the Utopians, while Arnone, Santollo and Salvato were with another local group, the Elgins. One night while the Utopians sang at Hamilton Park, Arnone, Santollo, and Salvato came to hear Canzano. The Elgins had just broken up, and the three wanted Canzano to sing lead in a new group they were forming. Vann accepted under the condition Bialoglow came with him.

Early in their run, Joey Vann got into a dispute with Joe Santollo causing him to leave the group. Without a lead, the group decided to hire a black lead singer sending them on a search through Jersey City's black neighborhood. They asked a man on a street corner where they could find singers around there, who directed them to a local barbershop. As they pulled away, Santollo asked him his name to which he replied "Dupree." Santollo liked it as a group name, but they remained as the Parisians until signing with Co-Ed in 1962.

=== Career with Coed Records ===
After recording a demo, the Parisians were looking for a record label to notice them. One of the labels was Coed Records. Forgetting to leave a phone number, the group waited two months for a response before finally returning to check in. As it turned out, Coed had liked their sound, and wanted them to audition but had no way to contact them. During the waiting period, Michael Kelly left the Parisians. Though he was the lead singer on their demo, they decided not to tell the label and instead called Vann to see if he would return, who agreed to do so.

In August 1962, they released their first album, You Belong To Me. The title song would become the group's biggest hit, spending 10 weeks on the weekly Billboard Top-40 charts and two weeks on weekly the Top-10 peaking at #7. Their recording of "My Own True Love" would also chart, peaking at 13 on the weekly Top-40 charts.

After their first release The Duprees became stars, touring the United States performing at concert venues such as the Apollo Theatre and for radio disc jockeys. They also toured with Dick Clark's Caravan of Stars.

In 1963, they released an album "Have You Heard?" and three charting singles, "Gone With The Wind" peaking at #89, "Have You Heard?" peaking at #18, and "Why Don't You Believe Me" peaking at #37.

Shortly before the release of "Have You Heard?" Bialoglow left the group after underwhelming royalties left him to decide between family and the group. After leaving the group, Bialoglow was not replaced and the album was produced and released without him.

=== Decline and continuation ===
In 1964, like many other groups, the Duprees were hurt by the British Invasion. Their final charting single under the name The Duprees came in 1965 with "Around The Corner" which peaked at #93 on the Billboard Hot 100 chart. Vann left the group sometime after "Have You Heard?" and was replaced, once again, by Kelly. The group continued to record thereafter, but turned in a more pop/rock direction with soul and funk influences, releasing an album under the name "The Italian Asphalt & Pavement Company" in 1970. "Check Yourself", the only single from the album, spent two weeks on the charts, reaching No. 97.

In 1978 Mike Kelly left the Duprees and was replaced by Tommy Petillo on lead vocals. The last live performance of original group members John Salvato, Mike Arnone and Joe Santollo (with Larry Casanova on vocals and Tommy Petillo on lead) was New Year's 1979.. In 1981 the active performing group consisted of original member Mike Arnone, Mike Schiavo on lead, Bob Leszczak on tenor, Al Latta on 2nd tenor, Bobby Wells on keyboards and Duane O'Hara on drums. This group can be seen on video in a Fabian's Goodtime Rock & Roll Special available for viewing on YouTube. In 1982, Schiavo was replaced by the returning Richie Rosato on lead vocals and this group can be seen on YouTube in a doo wop concert held at NYC's famous Studio 54. Bob Leszczak left the group in 1983 to pursue a career in radio broadcasting. At some point in this era, singer Bobby Valli, the younger brother of Frankie Valli, joined the group.

The original Duprees (Joey Vann Canzano, Mike Kelly, John Salvato, Tom Bialoglow, Joe Santollo and Mike Arnone) were inducted into the Vocal Group Hall of Fame in 2006.

The Duprees, with Mike Arnone, Phil Granito joining in 1987, Tony Testa in 1989 and Jimmy Spinelli joining the group in 1991 and Tommy Petillo returning as lead singer in 2002 to present 2023. The Duprees recorded 10 CDs from 1980 to 2023.

In 2021 Tony Testa retired.

In 2023 Phil Granito retired, with former Days of Our Lives star Shawn Stevens replacing him.

== Deaths ==
Joseph Santollo died on June 4, 1981, due to a heart attack.

Joey Canzano died on February 28, 1984, due to a heart attack.

Michael Arnone died on October 27, 2005.

Mike Kelly died on August 7, 2012.

== Discography ==
=== The original group ===
- You Belong to Me (Co-Ed, 1962, No. 101 US)
- Have You Heard (Co-Ed, 1963)
- Total Recall (Heritage, 1968) - Mike Kelly replacing Joey Vann as lead

=== As the Italian Asphalt & Pavement Co. ===
- The Italian Asphalt & Pavement Co. Presents Duprees Gold (Colossus, 1970)

=== 2001–current lineup ===
- The Duprees Go to the Movies (vol-1 2003)
- The Duprees Live at the Sands (vol-2 2003)
- Duprees Go to the Movies (2008)
- The Duprees Today (2008)
- A Duprees Christmas (2009)
- As Time Goes By (2010)
- Night of Legends Live: The Duprees/Little Anthony and the Imperials (2010)
- Great Songs of Our Time (2011)
- Fiftieth Anniversary Album (2012)
- Happy 100th Mr. Sinatra (2016)

=== Singles ===
- "My Own True Love" – Pop Chart #13 (1962)
- "You Belong to Me" – Pop Chart #7 (1962)
- "I'd Rather Be Here in Your Arms" - Pop Chart #91 (1962)
- "Gone with the Wind" – Pop Chart #89 (1963)
- "Have You Heard" – Pop Chart #18 (1963)
- "Why Don't You Believe Me" – Pop Chart #37 (1963)
- "(It's No) Sin" – Pop Chart #74 (1963)
- "Around the Corner" – Pop Chart #93 (1965)
- "Check Yourself" – Pop Chart #97 (1970)
- "Delicious" – Disco Singles #3 (1975)
