= Carl Mann =

American singer (1942–2020)

- Born: August 22, 1942; Huntingdon, Tennessee, U.S.
- Died: December 16, 2020 (aged 78) Jackson, Tennessee, U.S.
- Genres: Rockabilly, country
- Years active: 1957–1980s, 2005–2020
- Labels: ABC, Dot, Sun, Rockhouse

Carl Richard Mann (August 22, 1942 – December 16, 2020) was an American rockabilly singer and pianist from West Tennessee. He was referred to as "The Last Son of Sun", as he was one of the final artists introduced by Sam Phillips of Sun Records.

== Biography ==
Mann was born in Huntingdon, Tennessee, and raised in rural western Tennessee. His parents owned a lumber business. A child musical prodigy, he learned to play the guitar by age eight, sang in church, and by the age of eleven also began to perform country songs for local talent shows in nearby Jackson, Tennessee.

In 1957 at the age of 15, Mann released his first single on Jaxon Records, "Gonna Rock and Roll Tonight" b/w "Rockin' Love". After he released several more singles on Jaxon, W.S. Holland became Mann's manager, and took the young singer to Sun Records. (Holland was the drummer for singer/songwriter Carl Perkins.)

Sun owner Sam Phillips signed Mann to a three-year contract, and soon after, Sun released Mann's rockabilly version of Nat King Cole's "Mona Lisa" in 1959. Mann and Conway Twitty released single versions of the tune at the same time that year, and both charted; it was sixteen-year-old Mann's first hit, peaking at No. 24 on the US R&B Singles chart and No. 25 on the Billboard Hot 100. It ultimately sold a million records.

Mann's follow-up singles were less successful; he covered several pop standards, but his only charting hit was 1959's "Pretend", which peaked at No. 57 Pop. An LP, Like Mann, was released in 1960 but did not sell well, and Mann began to drift from the music business. After serving in the Army in 1964, he released a single, "Down to My Last I Love You", on Monument Records. But it failed and he returned to family life and the lumber business, where he battled with problems of alcoholism.

In 1974, Mann worked to revive his career as a country artist, releasing singles on ABC and Dot. His 1976 single "Twilight Time" scraped the US Country Singles chart, peaking at No. 100. In 1977, he landed a deal with Dutch record label Rockhouse Records, which released a live/studio split Gonna Rock'n'Roll Tonight in 1978 and In Rockabilly Country in 1981. Mann toured occasionally in Europe in the 1980s, but eventually returned to Tennessee and running the family logging outfit.

In 2005, Mann came out of music retirement, performing on the local Huntingdon Hayride radio show in his hometown. He continued to perform overseas and in the states, and record. He was inducted into the Rockabilly Hall of Fame in Jackson, Tennessee, in 2006. A CD called Rockabilly Highway, featuring Mann, and Sun Records label mates W. S. Holland and Rayburn Anthony, was released in 2008. Mann put out an album Carl Mann in 2012. Two other albums were released including his music.

Mann continued to perform, including at Sun Record showcases in Las Vegas, such as "Viva Las Vegas" at the Orleans Hotel, and at Nashville, Tennessee's "Ink and Iron", and other venues. When dates allowed, his sons, Richard and Joe Mann, joined him to carry on the family musical tradition.

Mann died at a hospital in Jackson, Tennessee, on December 16, 2020. He was 78 years old.

== Discography ==
=== Studio albums ===
- Like Mann (1960/08/17 Phillips International PLP 1960 [US])
- In Rockabilly Country (1981 Rockhouse RHLP-8102 [NL])
- Legacy - Strait & Narrow Road (2005/2 Round Midnight RAM 9001)
- Endlessly (Legendary Country Influences) (2006/8 Round Midnight RAM 9002)
- A Rockabilly Christmas (2007/11 Catalogue #171107)
- Rayburn Anthony, W.S. Holland & Carl Mann - Rockabilly Highway - After 50 Plus Years, Still Rockin’ (2009/1/1)
- Carl Mann (2012/5/1 Jaxon Records JRCD 20102 [Limited CD-R release])
- Carl Mann & Rayburn Anthony - Cruisin Around (2013 JL Records Sweden)
- Rockabilly Renaissance (2016 Jaxon Records JRCD 82119)

=== Live albums ===
- Gonna Rock 'N' Roll Tonight (1978 Rockhouse RHLP-7806 [NL])

=== Singles ===
- "Gonna Rock & Roll Tonight"/"Rockin' Love" (1957)
- "Mona Lisa"/"Foolish One" (1959)
- "Pretend"/"Rockin' Love" (1959)
- "Some Enchanted Evening"/"I Can't Forget" (1959)
- "Baby I Don't Care"/"Vanished" (1960)
- "South of the Border/"I'm Comin' Home" (1960)
- "The Wayward Wind"/"Born to Be Bad" (1960)
- "If I Could Change You"/"I Ain't Got No Home" (1961)
- "When I Grow Too Old to Dream"/"Mountain Dew" (1962)
- "The Serenade of the Bells"/"Down to My Last I Forgive You" (1966)
- "Burnin' Holes in the Eyes of Abraham Lincoln"/"The Ballad of Johnny Clyde" (1974)
- "Just About Out"/"Neon Lights" (1975)
- "Cheatin' Time"/"It's Not the Coffee" (1975)
- "Annie-Over-Time"/"Back Loving" (1975)
- "Twilight Time"/"Belly-Rubbin' Country Soul" (1976)

== Other reading ==
- Paul MacPhail, Carl Mann: The Last Son of Sun, 2010, self-published
