= My Friend (Eddie Fisher song) =

Single by Eddie Fisher
- B-side: "Green Years"
- Released: May 1954
- Genre: Traditional pop
- Length: 2:35
- Label: RCA Victor; 47-5748
- Songwriters: Ervin Drake; Jimmy Shirl

Eddie Fisher singles chronology
"A Girl, A Girl" (1954)	"My Friend" (1954)	"I Need You Now" (1954)

Professional ratings
Review scores
Source	Rating
Billboard	89/100 (Excellent)
Cashbox	A-grade (Disk of the Week)

"My Friend" is a song written by songwriting duo Ervin Drake and Jimmy Shirl and most notably performed by Eddie Fisher, who released it as a single under RCA Victor Records in early 1954, with a positive reception and a chart presence. Three other versions were recorded by Frankie Laine, Red Foley, and Fred Waring.

== Eddie Fisher version ==
=== Background and release ===
Eddie Fisher had been a recording artist for RCA Victor since the 1940s, gaining several hits. By 1954, Fisher was one of the best-selling pop vocalists. Following "A Girl, A Girl" which hit the top-10, Victor scheduled to release "My Friend" for May 1954. The song was written by the writers of fellow Victor recording artist Perry Como's hit "I Believe", and was also his first record with a clear religious message. On the B-side, Fisher recorded a song with a Latin beat titled "Green Years". Fisher recorded with Hugo Winterhalter's orchestra and chorus.

=== Critical reception ===
The single was met with a positive critical reception upon its release. Cashbox reviewed the single in mid-May and classified it as disk of the week, giving it an A grade. They stated that "Eddie has two such beautiful decks, that we must make some comment." Talking about "My Friend", the publication noted that "he offers a feelingful interpretation of a tender and moving song," adding "It's a stirring delivery of an 'I Believe' type of number that's loaded with meaning." Billboard magazine gave the single a positive review in May as well, saying "His sincerity and selling power are enough to make this another in his long list of hits." The magazine gave the song a rating of 89 out of 100 the following week, meaning it was "excellent". The San Francisco Chronicle called it a "particulary powerful effort", noting that it could "be in the trade" for a long while.

=== Chart performance ===
"My Friend" became another top-40 pop hit for Fisher. It debuted on the Billboard pop chart on June 12, 1954, reaching No. 15 during an eight-week run on it. The track entered the Cashbox Top 50 Best-Selling Singles chart in the issue dated May 29, 1954, peaking at a higher No. 12 during its fourteen-week stay on it.

=== Track listing ===
7" single (Victor 47-5748, 1954)
No.	Title	Writer(s)	Performance rights handled by	Length
1.	"My Friend"	Ervin Drake; Jimmy Shirl	ASCAP	2:35
2.	"Green Years"	Don Reid; Arthur Altman	ASCAP	2:45

== Charts ==
Chart performance for "My Friend"
Chart (1954)	Peak position
US Billboard Chart	15
US Cashbox Top 50 Best-Selling Singles	12
