= Why Don't You Believe Me? =

1952 popular song by Joni James

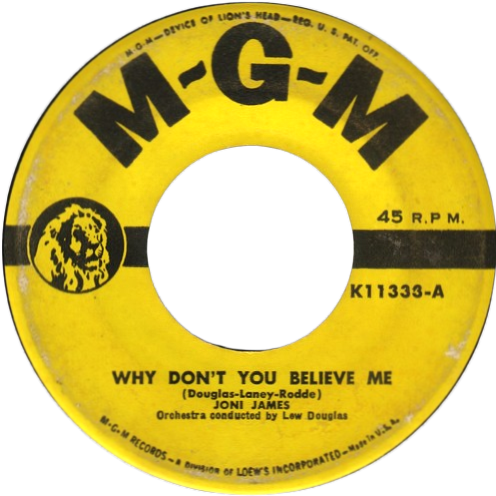

Single by Joni James

from the album Joni James' Award Winning Album
- B-side: "Purple Shades"
- Published: October 15, 1952 by Brandom Music Co., Chicago
- Released: October 18, 1952
- Recorded: June 16, 1952
- Length: 3:23
- Label: MGM 11333
- Songwriters: Lew Douglas; King Laney; Roy Rodde

Joni James singles chronology
"You Belong to Me" (1952)	"Why Don't You Believe Me?" (1952)	"You're My Everything" (1953)

"Why Don't You Believe Me"

Single by The Duprees
- B-side: "My Dearest One"
- Released: August 1963
- Recorded: 1963
- Genre: Doo-wop
- Length: 3:23
- Label: Coed
- Songwriters: Lew Douglas, King Laney, Roy Rodde

The Duprees singles chronology
"I Gotta Tell Her Now" (1963)	"Why Don't You Believe Me" (1963)	"Have You Heard" (1963)

"Why Don't You Believe Me?" is a popular song written by Lew Douglas, King Laney, and Roy Rodde and published in 1952.

== Notable versions ==
A recording by Joni James (MGM Records) reached number one on the Billboard charts for four weeks in November-December 1952. Competing versions by Patti Page (Mercury Records), chart position No. 4) and Margaret Whiting (Capitol Records, chart position No. 29) also charted in 1952. The B-side to Page's version was the well-known song "Conquest". On the Cash Box Best-Selling Record list, where all versions were combined (co-chart), the song reached number one that year.

Semprini, pianoforte with rhythm accompaniment recorded it as the first song of the medley "Dancing to the piano (No. 19) - Hit medley of foxtrots" along with "Cry My Heart" and "Even Now" in London on January 14, 1953. It was released by EMI on the His Master's Voice label. He recorded the song again, pianoforte with rhythm accompaniment recorded it as the first song of the medley "Dancing to the piano (No 30) - Hit Medley of foxtrots" along with "Downhearted" and "Till I Waltz Again with You" in London on March 11, 1953. The medley was released by EMI on the His Master's Voice label.

Bing Crosby sang it on four occasions on his radio show in 1953.

The Duprees' version reached number 37 on the Billboard Hot 100 in 1963. On the Cashbox singles chart, the single reached number 28.

Vic Damone's version was released as a single from his album You Were Only Fooling in July 1965. It bubbled under Billboard's Hot 100 chart, reaching number 127, and peaked at number 25 on the magazine's Easy Listening chart. It reached number 90 on the Cash Box singles chart and number 103 on the Record World 100 Top Pops singles chart.

Donna Stark (RCI Records) reached number 92 on the Billboard country music chart in 1980.

== Other recorded versions ==
- Pat Boone
- Dolly Dawn
- Maureen Evans
- Bobby Goldsboro
- Red Ingle
- Damita Jo
- The Kalin Twins
- Mickey Katz
- Herb Lance
- Brenda Lee
- Wade Legge
- Guy Lombardo
- Joe Loss with Rose Brennan
- Dean Martin
- Jane Morgan
- Norrie Paramor
- Jimmy Roselli
- Lita Roza
- Nancy Umeki
- Jerry Vale
- June Valli
- Bobby Vinton
- Robin Ward
- Lawrence Welk
- O. V. Wright
- Jimmy Young

== See also ==
- List of Billboard number-one singles of 1952
