= Let There Be Love (1953 Joni James album) =

Studio album by Joni James
- Released: 1953
- Recorded: 1953
- Genre: Pop
- Label: MGM

Joni James chronology
Let There Be Love (1953)	Joni James' "Award Winning Album" (1954)

Let There Be Love is Joni James's debut album, recorded in 1953 and released by MGM Records at the end of that year. It was released in a four-disc 10-inch 78 rpm record box, in both a two-disc 7-inch 45 rpm extended-play foldout album and a four-disc 45 rpm regular-play box and on a 10-inch 33 1/3 rpm album. The serial number, 222, coincidentally included James's lucky number, "22," which appeared in many of her record serial numbers all over the world.

The album is the first to present its songs as a book in music, opening with "Let There Be Love" and closing with "I'll Be Seeing You", with the songs telling a story start to finish. The cover was done at M-G-M Pictures Studios in Culver City by artist Russ Gale.

From the album a single with "Let There Be Love" and "You're Nearer" was shipped to radio stations. Then, by public demand, a single of "You're My Everything and "You're Nearer" was released.

This album offered Joni's second recording of "Let There Be Love", which had been released in an earlier version in 1952 as her first single on Sharp Records in Chicago, then going to M-G-M Records for further distribution. Both recordings were arranged and conducted by Lew Douglas.

Let There Be Love went to the top of the album charts and was the sixth-best-selling album of 1953.

== 1956 reissue ==
In 1956 the album was reissued as a 12-inch L.P. and in three single EPs; there was no EP set including the entire album. For this release, four Joni James singles were added, but one of them had never been released. That was "I Need You Now," which was to have followed the hit "My Love, My Love" but was canceled when Eddie Fisher came out with a version recorded several weeks after Joni's. M-G-M had expected Joni's original version to go straight to #1. For the new album the first four songs and second four songs were switched to get "You're My Everything" in the outside groove of the L.P. to facilitate disc jockey play. So, for 50 years, the story the album tells has been garbled. In 1961 the album got new cover art, a new serial number (E3931), and an electronically simulated stereo release. Released again on compact disc with yet more bonus tracks, the album is in its fifth decade as a best seller. James, who died in 2022, said she hoped for another release that restored the original song order. Significantly, for her last M-G-M album, Bossa Nova Style, Joni included new recordings of several songs from Let There Be Love, including a new single of "You're Nearer." That album was arranged by Lew Douglas's protégé Chuck Sagle. This information comes from Wayne Brasler, longtime President of the Joni James International Fan Club and the writer of the album notes for all Joni James' CD releases.

== Track listing ==
Track #	Song title	Songwriter(s)
1	"You're My Everything"	Harry Warren/Mort Dixon/Joe Young
2	"You're Nearer"	Rodgers and Hart
3	"Love Is Here to Stay"	George Gershwin/Ira Gershwin
4	"I'll Be Seeing You"	Sammy Fain/Irving Kahal
5	"Let There Be Love"	Lionel Rand/Ian Grant
6	"My Romance"	Richard Rodgers/Lorenz Hart
7	"The Nearness of You"	Hoagy Carmichael/Ned Washington
8	"You're Mine You"	Johnny Green/Edward Heyman
9	"I Need You Now"	Al Jacobs/Jimmie Crane
10	"This Is My Confession"	Eddie Pola/Marjorie Goetschius
11	"The Moment I Saw You"	Robert Mellin/Richard Savage
12	"Am I in Love?"	Nick Acquaviva/Ted Varnick
