= Lew Douglas =

- Born: August 25, 1912; Grand Rapids, Michigan, U.S.
- Origin: Grand Rapids, Michigan, U.S
- Died: November 11, 1997 (aged 85) Chicago Heights, Illinois, U.S
- Occupations: Composer, Arranger, Conductor

Lew Douglas (August 25, 1912 – November 11, 1997) was an American composer, arranger, and conductor.

== Background ==
Born in Grand Rapids, Michigan, Douglas was in the Army during the Second World War and became an arranger and conductor for some of the U.S. Army swing bands. After completing his military service, he moved to Chicago, where he continued his musical education at the Chicago Conservatory of Music. He started arranging for big bands such as Ted Weems, Eddy Howard, and Dan Belloc. Douglas was taken on by NBC to be one of the staff arrangers for many TV shows, including Dave Garroway at Large and Your Show of Shows. Subsequently, Douglas moved on to be head arranger and producer for Mercury Records in Chicago, and he was involved in many major hits, including "Kisses Sweeter than Wine" by The Weavers, "The Bible Tells Me So," performed by Nick Noble and the Lew Douglas Orchestra; "Two Hearts, Two Kisses," sung by Pat Boone, "Bewitched, Bothered and Bewildered" by Bill Snyder and Patti Page's "Confess".

== Songwriting ==
Famously, he is quoted as saying "My first love is arranging and producing, but when I get stuck for a song, I write one." He is most noted for three major compositions in the 1950s. In January 1953, Douglas had the number 1 song, "Why Don't You Believe Me?" sung by Joni James, The number 10 song, "Have You Heard?", again by Joni James, and the number 13 song, "Pretend", sung by Nat King Cole.

== Discography ==
Year	Artist	Title	Label
1950	Bill Snyder	"Bewitched"	Mercury
1952	Joni James	"Why Don't You Believe Me?"	MGM
1953	Joni James	"Your Cheatin' Heart"	MGM
1955	Nick Noble	"The Bible Tells Me So"	Mercury
1955	Pat Boone	"Two Hearts, Two Kisses"	Dot
1956	Vic Damone	"On the Street Where You Live"	Columbia

=== As arranger ===
With Ramsey Lewis

- Country Meets the Blues (Argo, 1962)
