= You're My Everything (1931 song) =

1931 song by Harry Warren, Mort Dixon & Joe Young

Song
- Published: 1931
- Composer: Harry Warren
- Lyricists: Mort Dixon, Joe Young

"You're My Everything"' is a 1931 song with music by Harry Warren and lyrics by Mort Dixon and Joe Young. The song was written for the revue The Laugh Parade starring Ed Wynn which opened in New York City on November 2, 1931. The song was sung by Jeanne Aubert and Lawrence Gray.

Hit versions in 1931 and 1932 were by Arden-Ohman Orchestra (vocal by Frank Luther); Russ Columbo; and Ben Selvin.

== Other versions ==
- Al Bowlly
- Billy Eckstine and his Orchestra
- Max Bygraves, chart single 1969
- Connie Francis
- Carmen Cavallaro
- Francis Scott and His Orchestra
- Gisele MacKenzie
- Jerry Colonna
- Joni James - Let There Be Love (1953)
- Miles Davis Quintet - with false starts

The song also appears on the following albums:

- Hub-Tones by trumpeter Freddie Hubbard recorded on October 10, 1962
- Hopeless Romantics by American vocalist Michael Feinstein accompanied by pianist George Shearing, recorded in 2002
- Trilogy (Chick Corea album)
- soundtrack of Painting the Clouds with Sunshine (film) 1951, directed by David Butler and starring Dennis Morgan and Virginia Mayo
- Structurally Sound by American jazz saxophonist Booker Ervin recorded in 1967
- I Don't Want to Be Hurt Anymore a 1964 studio album by Nat King Cole
- Love Songs (Nat King Cole album)
- The Legendary Prestige Quintet Sessions by the Miles Davis Quintet
- Sarah Vaughan Sings Broadway: Great Songs from Hit Shows
