= Have You Heard? =

Song
- Published: 1952
- Songwriters: Lew Douglas, Frank LaVere, LeRoy W. Rodde

"Have You Heard"

Single by The Duprees
- B-side: "Love Eyes"
- Released: October 1963
- Recorded: 1963
- Genre: Doo-wop
- Length: 2:25
- Label: Coed
- Songwriters: Lew Douglas, Frank LaVere, LeRoy W. Rodde

The Duprees singles chronology
"Why Don't You Believe Me?" (1963)	"Have You Heard" (1963)	"(It's No) Sin" (1964)

"Have You Heard?" is a popular song written by Lew Douglas, Frank LaVere and LeRoy W. Rodde and published in 1952. The biggest hit version was recorded by Joni James in 1952, charting the next year. The recording by Joni James was released by MGM Records as catalog number 11390. It first reached the Billboard magazine charts on December 27, 1952 and lasted 14 weeks on the chart, peaking at No.4. The flip side was "Wishing Ring."

== The Duprees recording ==
The song was revived by the US group, The Duprees and was a hit again in 1963. The version went to No.18 on the Hot 100 and No.8 on the Middle-Road Singles chart.

== Other recorded versions ==
- The Belmonts
- Tony Brent
- Lita Roza
- Sonny Til and The Orioles
- The Beverley Sisters
- Bob Gibson & His Orchestra, Ross Higgins, vocal (Australia)
