= You Are My Love (1955 song) =

Song
- Published: 1955
- Label: MGM
- Songwriter(s): Jimmie Nabbie

"You Are My Love" is a popular song. It was written by Jimmie Nabbie and was published in 1955.

The song was written by request by Nabbie for Joni James, for whom it was a major hit. The song was released by MGM Records as catalog number 12066. The song entered the Cash Box magazine best-selling singles chart on October 1, and reached No.11, its highest position, on November 19, lasting altogether 16 weeks on the Cash Box best-seller chart. On the Billboard charts, Joni James' record first made the listing on October 22, spending 10 weeks on those charts, reaching No.6 on the disk jockey chart, No.18 on the best-selling records chart, and No.15 on the composite top-100 chart.
