= Pretend (1952 song) =

Song
- Genre: Pop
- Songwriters: Dan Belloc; Lew Douglas; Cliff Paraman; Frank Levere

"Pretend" is a popular song, written in 1952 by Dan Belloc, Lew Douglas, Cliff Parman and Frank Levere.

The best-known recording, by Nat King Cole, was released by Capitol Records as catalog number 2346. It first reached the Billboard Best Seller chart on January 31, 1953, and lasted 20 weeks on the chart, peaking at No. 3. It also reached No. 2 on the UK Singles Chart in May 1953, just behind Frankie Laine's chart topping hit, "I Believe". Cole would later re-record the song for his 1961 album The Nat King Cole Story.

On the Cash Box chart, where all versions of the song were combined, the song reached a peak of No. 5 in 1953. These versions were recorded by Laine, King Cole, Eileen Barton, Ralph Martiere, and Henri Rene.

== Other Recorded versions ==
- Nat King Cole (1953)
- A recording by Eileen Barton was released by Coral Records as catalog number 60927. It reached the Billboard Best Seller chart on March 7, 1953 at No. 18, its only week on the chart.
- The recording by Ralph Marterie was released by Mercury Records as catalog number 70045. It reached the Billboard Best Seller chart on February 7, 1953 at No. 16, its only week on the chart.
- Henri Rene & His Orchestra feat Franz Dietschmann (zither solo) (1953
- In 1957, a Tab Smith, recording reached No. 89 on the Billboard chart
- In 1959, Carl Mann (issued as catalog number 3546 by Philips International), reaching No. 57 on Billboard and No. 56 on Cash Box. This version was included on Like Mann (1960)
- Keely Smith (1959) on the album Be My Love
- Georgia Gibbs (1959)
- Tielman Brothers (1960) on the album Tielman On Stage
- Brenda Lee on This Is...Brenda (1960)
- Gerry & The Pacemakers included it on the album How Do You Like It? (1963) , and performed it live with The Everly Brothers in 1965 on Shindig!.
- Johnny Preston released a version of the song on his 1960 album, Running Bear.
- Buzz Clifford (1963)
- Sammy Davis Jr., The Nat King Cole Songbook, (1965)
- Marvin Gaye on A Tribute to the Great Nat King Cole (1965)
- Alvin Stardust's version was a popular hit in the United Kingdom in 1981, when it reached No. 4 on the UK Singles Chart. This cover was largely based on Carl Mann's 1959 version of this song.
- Don Williams on Borrowed Tales (1995)
- Barbra Lica (2012)
