= Joni James =

American singer (1930–2022)

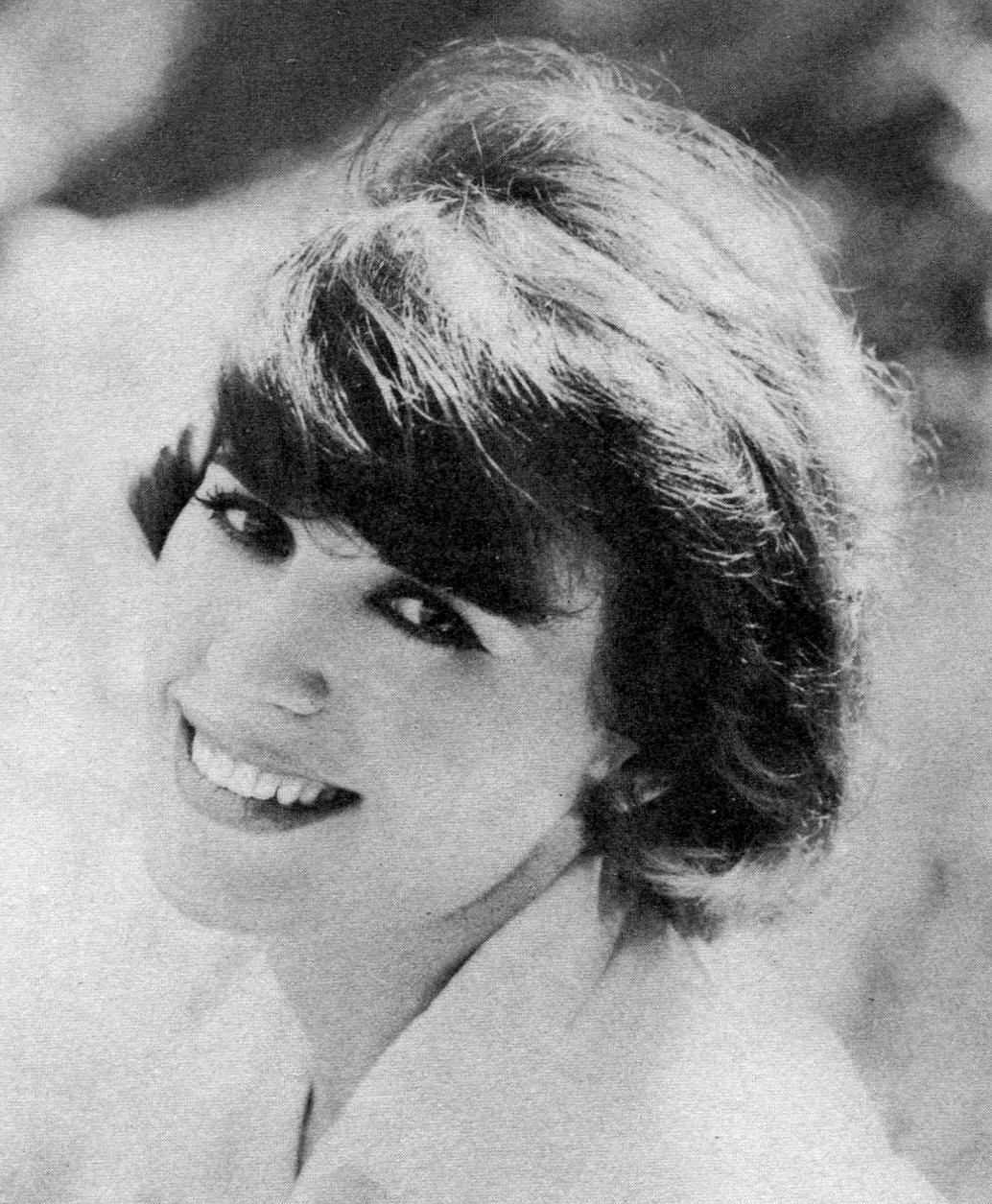
- James in 1962

Background information
- Born: Giovanna Carmella Babbo; September 22, 1930; Chicago, Illinois, U.S.
- Died: February 20, 2022 (aged 91) West Palm Beach, Florida, U.S.
- Genres: Traditional pop
- Years active: 1952–1964
- Label: MGM
- Website: www.jonijames.com

Giovanna Carmella Babbo (September 22, 1930 – February 20, 2022), known professionally as Joni James, was an American singer of traditional pop.

== Biography ==
Giovanna Carmella Babbo was born to an Italian-American family in Chicago, Illinois, on September 22, 1930, as one of six children supported by her widowed mother. As an adolescent, she studied drama and ballet, and on graduating from Bowen High School, located in the South Chicago neighborhood, went with a local dance group on a tour of Canada. She then took a job as a chorus girl in the Edgewater Beach Hotel in Chicago.

After doing a fill-in in Indiana, she decided to pursue a singing career, and picked the stage name Joni James at the urging of her managers. Some executives at Metro-Goldwyn-Mayer (MGM) spotted her in a television commercial, and she was signed by MGM in 1952. Her first hit, "Why Don't You Believe Me?", sold over two million copies. She had a number of hits following that one, including "Your Cheatin' Heart" (a cover of Hank Williams' hit) and "Have You Heard?". She was the first American to record at London's Abbey Road Studios, and recorded five albums there. She was also very popular across parts of the Asia-Pacific region, particularly in the Philippines where she performed at Manila's now defunct EM Club in 1957. She also scored a big hit in Manila with Filipino composer Salvador Asuncion's work titled "In Despair".

Joni James had seven Top 10 hits on the various Billboard charts that existed before the Hot 100: "Why Don't You Believe Me?" (No. 1 in 1952) "Have You Heard?" (No. 4 in 1953) "Your Cheatin' Heart" (No. 2 in 1953) "Almost Always" (No. 9 in 1953) "My Love, My Love" (No. 8 in 1953) "How Important Can It Be?" (No. 2 in 1955) and "You Are My Love" (No. 6 in 1955) as well as sixteen other Top 40 hits from 1952 to 1960. She has sold more than 100 million records and recorded more than 25 albums.

== Personal life ==
James married composer-conductor Anthony "Tony" Acquaviva at St. Patrick's Cathedral, New York in 1956. In 1964, she retired from the music industry in part because Acquaviva was in bad health and needed her attention. She cared for him until his death in 1986.

Shortly after her first husband's death, James met retired Air Force General Bernard Schriever. He had led the crash program that developed U.S. ballistic missiles — both ICBMs and IRBMs in 1953–62. The couple wed on October 5, 1997, in Arlington, Virginia. They honeymooned in France and the Greek Isles, then took up residence in Schriever's home in Washington, D.C. Bernard Schriever died on June 20, 2005, aged 94.

James is mentioned by Snoopy in the last panel of the May 1, 1976, comic strip of Charles M. Schulz's Peanuts. Schulz was a fan and friend of James who had Snoopy featured on the cover of her Jukebox Joni 1999 compilation album.

== Later years ==
For many years she was out of the public eye, but began touring again in the mid-1990s some years after she was widowed, performing memorable concerts at New York's Town Hall, Carnegie Hall and Avery Fisher Hall.

With her renewed popularity, nearly her entire body of work was released on the Capitol-EMI, DRG and Taragon labels under her personal supervision and, in 2000, she released a new recording, Latest and Greatest. In October 2001, just a few weeks after 9/11, she appeared at the Academy of Music in Philadelphia, accompanied by the Count Basie orchestra. The streets of the city were still lined with armed soldiers, and she was a guest of honor at the American Film Institute's Life Achievement Tribute to Barbra Streisand.

James died at a hospital in West Palm Beach, Florida, on February 20, 2022, at the age of 91. She was interred at Arlington National Cemetery.

For her contributions to the entertainment industry, James has a star on the Hollywood Walk of Fame.

== Singles ==
Year	Single (A-side, B-side) Both sides from same album except where indicated	Chart positions				Album
Year	Single (A-side, B-side) Both sides from same album except where indicated	^{U.S.}	^{CB}	^{CAN}	^{UK}	Album
1952	"Let There Be Love" b/w "My Baby Just Cares for Me" (Non-album track)	—	—	—	—	Let There Be Love
1952	"You Belong to Me" b/w "Yes, Yes, Yes"	—	—	—	—	Non-album tracks
1952	"Why Don't You Believe Me?" /	1	1	—	11	Joni James' Award Winning Album
1952	"Purple Shades"	26	—	—	—	Joni James' Award Winning Album
1953	"You're My Everything" b/w "You're Nearer"	—	24	—	—	Let There Be Love
1953	"Have You Heard?" /	4	3	—	—	Joni James' Award Winning Album
1953	"Wishing Ring"	17	21	—	—	Joni James' Award Winning Album
1953	"Your Cheatin' Heart" b/w "I'll Be Waiting for You" (Non-album track)	2	4	—	—	Joni James' Award Winning Album
1953	"Almost Always" /	9	16	—	—	Joni James' Award Winning Album
1953	"Is It Any Wonder?"	16	27	—	—	Joni James' Award Winning Album
1953	"My Love, My Love" /	8	13	—	—	Joni James' Award Winning Album
1953	"You're Fooling Someone"	11	21	—	—	Award Winning Album Vol. 2
1953	"I'll Never Stand in Your Way" /	23	22	—	—	Non-album tracks
1953	"Why Can't I"	—	30	—	—	Non-album tracks
1953	"Nina-Non" b/w "Christmas and You"	27	27	—	—	Merry Christmas from Joni
1954	"Maybe Next Time" /	22	33	—	—	Non-album track
1954	"Am I in Love"	22	23	—	—	Let There Be Love
1954	"In a Garden of Roses" /	22	23	—	—	Award Winning Album Vol. 2
1954	"Every Day"	23	48	—	—	Non-album tracks
1954	"Mama Don't Cry at My Wedding" /	23	19	—	—	Non-album tracks
1954	"Pa Pa Pa"	—	42	—	—	Non-album tracks
1954	"When We Come of Age" b/w "Every Time You Tell Me You Love Me" (Non-album track)	28	19	—	—	Joni James' Award Winning Album
1955	"The Moment I Saw You" b/w "Where Is That Someone for Me"	—	48	—	—	Non-album tracks
1955	"Have Yourself a Merry Little Christmas" b/w "The Christmas Song (Merry Christmas to You)"	—	—	—	—	Merry Christmas from Joni
1955	"How Important Can It Be?" b/w "This Is My Confession" (from Let There Be Love)	2	6	—	—	Joni James' Award Winning Album
1955	"When You Wish upon a Star" /	—	48	—	—	Award Winning Album Vol. 2
1955	"Is This the End of the Line"	—	23	—	—	Non-album tracks
1955	"You Are My Love" b/w "I Lay Me Down to Sleep" (from Little Girl Blue)	6	11	—	—	Non-album tracks
1955	"My Believing Heart" b/w "You Never Fall In Love Again" (Non-album track)	49	31	—	—	Joni James' Award Winning Album
1956	"Danny Boy" b/w "To You I Give My Heart" (Non-album track)	—	—	—	—	Joni James Sings Irish Favorites
1956	"Don't Tell Me Not to Love You" b/w "Somewhere Someone Is Lonely"	83	—	—	—	Non-album tracks
1956	"I Woke Up Crying" b/w "The Maverick Queen"	72	37	—	—	Non-album tracks
1956	"Give Us This Day" /	30	30	—	—	Give Us This Day
1956	"How Lucky You Are" b/w "Give Us This Day"	70	—	—	—	Award Winning Album Vol. 2
1956	"Love Letters" b/w "Don't Take Your Love from Me" (from In the Still of the Night)	—	—	—	—	Non-album tracks
1957	"Only Trust Your Heart" b/w "I Need You So"	—	—	—	—	Non-album tracks
1957	"Summer Love" b/w "I'm Sorry for You, My Friend" (from Joni James Sings Songs of Hank Williams)	97	—	—	—	Non-album tracks
1958	"Nothing Will Ever Change" b/w "Does It Show"	—	—	—	—	Non-album tracks
1958	"Love Works Miracles" b/w "Dansero" (from Award Winning Album Vol. 2)	—	—	—	—	Non-album tracks
1958	"Junior Prom" b/w "Coming from You"	—	—	—	—	Non-album tracks
1958	"There Goes My Heart" b/w "Funny" (Non-album track)	19	21	27	—	More Joni Hits
1959	"There Must Be a Way" b/w "Sorry for Myself?" (Non-album track)	33	28	30	24	More Joni Hits
1959	"I Still Get a Thrill" b/w "Perhaps"	51	45	38	—	More Joni Hits
1959	"I Still Get Jealous" b/w "Prayer of Love"	63	66	—	—	More Joni Hits
1959	"Are You Sorry?" b/w "What I Don't Know Won't Hurt Me" (Non-album track)	102	106	—	—	More Joni Hits
1959	"Little Things Mean a Lot" /	35	54	40	—	More Joni Hits
1959	"I Laughed at Love"	108	123			More Joni Hits
1960	"I Need You Now" /	98	tag	—	—	Non-album tracks
1960	"You Belong to Me"	101	114	—	—	Award Winning Album Vol. 2
1960	"We Know" b/w "They Really Don't Know You"	—	124	—	—	More Joni Hits
1960	"My Last Date (With You)" b/w "I Can't Give You Anything But Love" (from I'm in the Mood for Love)	38	54	—	—	Non-album tracks
1960	"Be My Love" b/w "Tall a Tree" (from One Hundred Voices...One Hundred Strings and Joni)	—	112	—	—	Non-album tracks
1961	"Theme from 'Carnival'" b/w "Can You Imagine That"	—	—	—	—	Non-album tracks
1961	"I Gave My Love" b/w "Go Away (Bother Me No More)"	—	—	—	—	Folk Songs By Joni James
1961	"Somebody Else Is Taking My Place" b/w "You Were Wrong"	—	123	—	—	Non-album tracks
1962	"I Almost Lost My Mind" b/w "I'll Be Around"	—	—	—	—	After Hours
1962	"Tender and True" b/w "It's Magic" (from I'm Your Girl)	—	—	—	—	Non-album track
1962	"You Are My Sunshine" b/w "Lend Me Your Handkerchief"	—	—	—	—	Country Style
1962	"Anyone But Her" b/w "Forgive a Fool"	—	126	—	—	Non-album tracks
1963	"He Says the Same Things to Me" b/w "Hey, Good Lookin'" (from Joni James Sings Songs of Hank Williams)	—	—	—	—	Non-album tracks
1963	"Red Sails in the Sunset" b/w "Every Time I Meet You"	—	—	—	—	Like 3 O'Clock in the Morning
1964	"Teach Me to Forget You" b/w "Un Caffe" (from Italianissime!)	—	—	—	—	Non-album tracks
1964	"Break My Heart" b/w "Don't Let the Neighbors Know"	—	—	—	—	Non-album tracks
1964	"Pearly Shells" b/w "Hawaiian War Chant"	—	—	—	—	Beyond The Reef
1964	"Sentimental Me" b/w "You're Nearer" (from Bossa Nova Style; new version of song from Let There Be Love)	—	—	—	—	Non-album track
1964	"Once I Loved" b/w "Dindi"	—	—	—	—	Bossa Nova Style
1965	"There Goes My Heart" b/w "I Still Get Jealous"	—	—	—	—	More Joni Hits

== Albums ==
- Let There Be Love MGM (1954)
- Joni James' "Award Winning Album" MGM 3346 (1954)
- Little Girl Blue MGM (1955)
- When I Fall in Love MGM (1955)
- In the Still of the Night MGM (1956)
- Songs by Victor Young and Songs by Frank Loesser MGM (1956) – later reissued as My Foolish Heart
- Merry Christmas from Joni MGM (1956)
- Give Us This Day (Songs of Inspiration) MGM (1957)
- Sings Songs by Jerome Kern and Songs by Harry Warren MGM (1957)
- Among My Souvenirs MGM (1958)
- Je T'aime... I Love You MGM (1958)
- Songs of Hank Williams MGM (1959)
- Joni Swings Sweet MGM (1959)
- Joni Sings Irish Favo(u)rites MGM (1959)
- 100 Strings and Joni MGM 3755 (1959)
- Joni at Carnegie Hall MGM (1960)
- I'm In the Mood for Love MGM (1960)
- 100 Strings & Joni In Hollywood MGM (1960) – also known as Joni Sings Hollywood
- One Hundred Voices... One Hundred Strings & Joni MGM (1960) – also stylized as 100 Voices, 100 Strings & Joni
- 100 Strings & Joni On Broadway MGM (1960)
- The Mood is Blue MGM (1961)
- The Mood is Romance MGM (1961)
- The Mood is Swinging MGM (1961)
- Folk Songs by Joni James MGM (1961) – also known as Joni Sings Folksongs
- Ti Voglio Bene... I Love You MGM (1961)
- Joni After Hours MGM (1962)
- I'm Your Girl MGM (1962)
- Country Style MGM (1962)
- I Feel a Song Coming On MGM (1962)
- Like 3 O'Clock in the Morning MGM (1962)
- Something for the Boys MGM (1963)
- Beyond The Reef MGM (1964)
- Joni Sings the Gershwins MGM (1964)
- My Favorite Things MGM (1964)
- Put On A Happy Face MGM (1964)
- Italianissima! MGM (1964)
- Bossa Nova Style MGM 4286 (1965)
- Why Don't You Believe Me? Bygone Days BYD77053 (2010) – compilation
