= List of Billboard number-one singles from 1950 to 1958 =

List of articles

Billboard number-one singles charts preceding the Billboard Hot 100 were updated weekly by Billboard magazine and the leading indicator of popular music for the American music industry since 1940 and until the Billboard Hot 100 chart was established in 1958.

Before the Billboard Hot 100 chart was established in August 1958, Billboard used to publish several weekly charts. Throughout most of the 1950s, the magazine published the following charts to measure a song's popularity:

- Most Played by Jockeys – ranked the most played songs on United States radio stations, as reported by radio disc jockeys and radio stations.
- Most Played in Jukeboxes – ranked the most played songs in jukeboxes across the United States.
- Best Selling Pop Singles (later renamed to Best Selling Singles and then renamed to Best Sellers in Stores) – ranked the biggest selling singles in retail stores, as reported by merchants surveyed throughout the country.

== Number ones ==
Key
♪ – Number-one single of the year

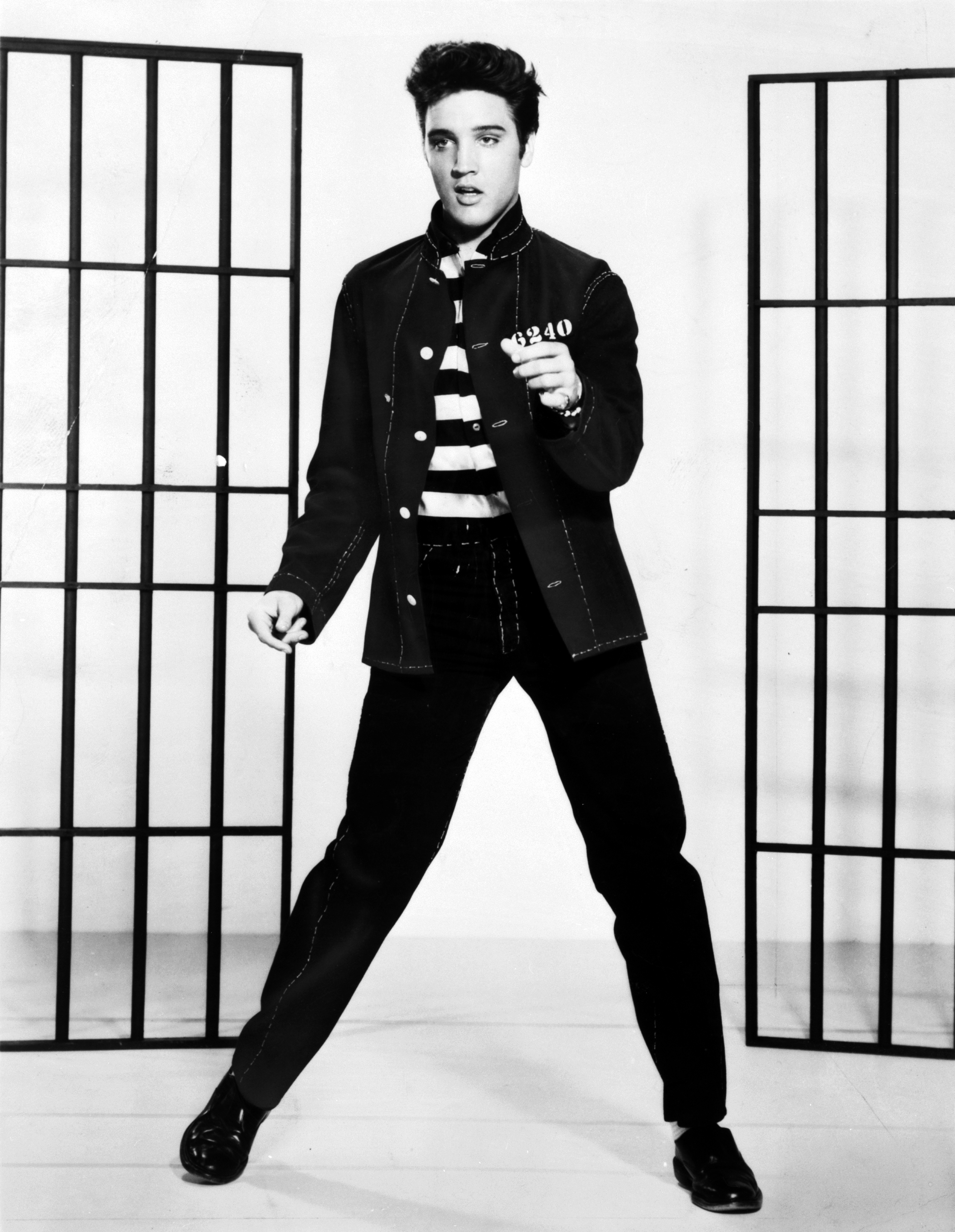
Elvis Presley had the highest number of hits at the top of the Billboard number-one singles chart between January 1950 until August 1958 (10 songs) in addition, Presley remained the longest at the top of the Billboard number-one singles chart between January 1950 until August 1958 (57 weeks).

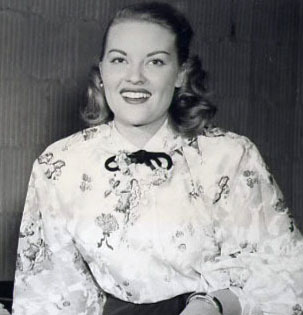
Patti Page was the artist with second-longest most cumulative run at number one (22 weeks) between January 1950 until August 1958.

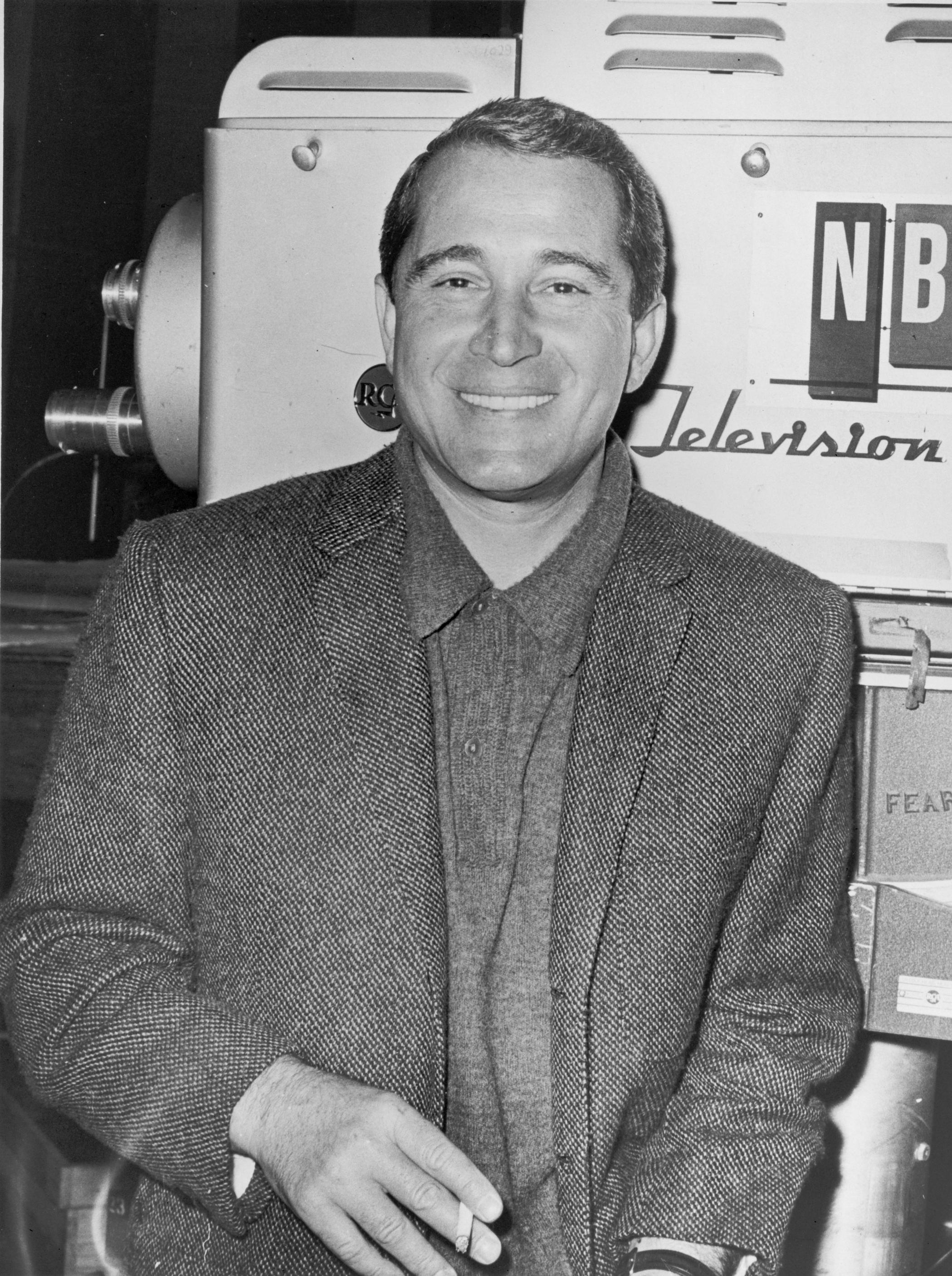
Perry Como remained at the top of the Billboard number-one singles chart for 20 weeks between January 1950 until August 1958.

	Reached number one	Artist(s)	Single	Record label	Weeks at number one	Ref
1950
96	January 7, 1950	Gene Autry	"Rudolph, The Red-nosed Reindeer"	Columbia	1	
97	January 14, 1950	The Andrews Sisters	"I Can Dream, Can't I"	Decca	4	
98	February 11, 1950	The Ames Brothers	"Rag Mop"	Coral	1	
99	February 18, 1950	Red Foley	"Chattanoogie Shoe Shine Boy"	Decca	4	
100	March 18, 1950	Teresa Brewer	"Music! Music! Music!"	London	4	
101	April 15, 1950	Eileen Barton	"If I Knew You Were Comin' I'd've Baked a Cake"	National (local); Mercury (nationwide)	2	
102	April 29, 1950	Anton Karas	"The Third Man Theme"	London	11	
103	July 15, 1950	Nat King Cole	"Mona Lisa"	Capitol	5	
104	August 19, 1950	Gordon Jenkins and The Weavers	"Goodnight Irene"♪ (1950)	Decca	13	
105	November 18, 1950	Sammy Kaye	"Harbor Lights"	Columbia	2	
106	December 2, 1950	Phil Harris	"The Thing"	RCA Victor	4	
107	December 30, 1950	Patti Page	"The Tennessee Waltz"	Mercury	9	
1951
108	March 3, 1951	Perry Como	"If"	RCA Victor	6	
109	March 10, 1951	Mario Lanza	"Be My Love"	RCA Victor (Red Seal)	1	
110	April 21, 1951	Les Paul and Mary Ford	"How High The Moon"	Capitol	9	
111	June 23, 1951	Nat King Cole	"Too Young"♪ (1951)	Capitol	5	
112	July 28, 1951	Rosemary Clooney	"Come On-a My House"	Columbia	6	
113	September 8, 1951	Tony Bennett	"Because Of You"	Columbia	8	
114	November 3, 1951	Tony Bennett	"Cold, Cold Heart"	Columbia	6	
115	December 15, 1951	Eddy Howard	"Sin (It's No Sin)"	Mercury	2	
116	December 29, 1951	Johnnie Ray and The Four Lads	"Cry"	Okeh (Columbia)	11	
1952
117	March 15, 1952	Kay Starr	"Wheel Of Fortune"	Capitol	9	
118	May 17, 1952	Leroy Anderson	"Blue Tango"♪ (1952)	Decca	5	
119	June 21, 1952	Al Martino	"Here In My Heart"	Capitol	2	
120	July 5, 1952	Percy Faith	"Delicado"	Columbia	1	
121	July 12, 1952	Vera Lynn	"Auf Wiederseh'n Sweetheart"	London	9	
122	September 13, 1952	Jo Stafford	"You Belong To Me"	Columbia	5	
123	October 18, 1952	Patti Page	"I Went To Your Wedding"	Mercury	5	
124	November 22, 1952	Johnny Standley	"It's In The Book (parts 1 & 2)"	Capitol	1	
125	November 29, 1952	Joni James	"Why Don't You Believe Me"	MGM	4	
126	December 27, 1952	Jimmy Boyd	"I Saw Mommy Kissing Santa Claus"	Columbia	2	
1953
127	January 10, 1953	Perry Como	"Don't Let the Stars Get in Your Eyes"	RCA Victor	5	
128	February 14, 1953	Teresa Brewer	"Till I Waltz Again With You"	Coral	5	
129	March 21, 1953	Patti Page	"The Doggie In The Window"	Mercury	8	
130	May 16, 1953	Percy Faith	"The Song From Moulin Rouge (Where Is Your Heart)"♪ (1953)	Columbia	10	
131	July 25, 1953	Eddie Fisher	"I'm Walking Behind You"	RCA Victor	2	
132	August 8, 1953	Les Paul and Mary Ford	"Vaya Con Dios (May God Be With You)"	Capitol	11	
133	October 10, 1953	Stan Freberg	"St. George And The Dragonet"	Capitol	4	
134	November 21, 1953	Tony Bennett	"Rags To Riches"	Columbia	6	
1954
135	January 2, 1954	Eddie Fisher	"Oh! My Pa-pa (O Mein Papa)"	RCA Victor	8	
136	February 27, 1954	Doris Day	"Secret Love"	Columbia	3	
137	March 13, 1954	Jo Stafford	"Make Love To Me!"	Columbia	3	
138	April 10, 1954	Perry Como	"Wanted"	RCA Victor	8	
139	June 5, 1954	Kitty Kallen	"Little Things Mean A Lot"♪ (1954)	Decca	9	
140	August 7, 1954	The Crew Cuts	"Sh-Boom"	Mercury	7	
141	September 25, 1954	Rosemary Clooney	"Hey There"	Columbia	6	
142	November 6, 1954	Rosemary Clooney	"This Ole House"	Columbia	1	
143	November 13, 1954	Eddie Fisher	"I Need You Now"	RCA Victor	3	
144	December 4, 1954	The Chordettes	"Mr. Sandman"	Cadence	7	
1955
145	January 22, 1955	Joan Weber	"Let Me Go, Lover!"	Columbia	2	
146	February 5, 1955	The Fontane Sisters	"Hearts Of Stone"	Dot	1	
147	February 12, 1955	The McGuire Sisters	"Sincerely"	Coral	6	
148	March 26, 1955	Bill Hayes	"The Ballad Of Davy Crockett"	Cadence	5	
149	April 30, 1955	Pérez Prado	"Cherry Pink And Apple Blossom White"♪ (1955)	RCA Victor	10	
150	July 9, 1955	Bill Haley & His Comets	"Rock Around The Clock"	Decca	8	
151	September 3, 1955	Mitch Miller	"The Yellow Rose of Texas"	Columbia	6	
152	October 15, 1955	The Four Aces	"Love Is A Many Splendored Thing"	Decca	2	
153	October 29, 1955	Roger Williams	"Autumn Leaves"	Kapp	4	
154	November 26, 1955	Tennessee Ernie Ford	"Sixteen Tons"	Capitol	7	
1956
155	January 14, 1956	Dean Martin	"Memories Are Made Of This"	Capitol	5	
156	February 18, 1956	Kay Starr	"Rock And Roll Waltz"	RCA Victor	1	
157	February 25, 1956	Nelson Riddle	"Lisbon Antigua"	Capitol	4	
158	March 24, 1956	Les Baxter	"Poor People Of Paris"	Capitol	4	
159	April 21, 1956	Elvis Presley	"Heartbreak Hotel"♪ (1956)	RCA Victor	8	
160	June 16, 1956	Gogi Grant	"The Wayward Wind"	Era	6	
161	July 28, 1956	Elvis Presley	"I Want You, I Need You, I Love You"	RCA Victor	1	
162	August 4, 1956	The Platters	"My Prayer"	Mercury	2	
163	August 18, 1956	Elvis Presley	"Don't Be Cruel" / "Hound Dog"	RCA Victor	11	
164	November 3, 1956	Elvis Presley	"Love Me Tender"	RCA Victor	5	
165	December 8, 1956	Guy Mitchell	"Singing The Blues"	Columbia	9	
1957
166	February 9, 1957	Elvis Presley	"Too Much"	RCA Victor	3	
167	March 2, 1957	Tab Hunter	"Young Love"	Dot	4	
168	March 30, 1957	Buddy Knox	"Party Doll"	Roulette	1	
169	April 6, 1957	Perry Como	"Round And Round"	RCA Victor	1	
170	April 13, 1957	Elvis Presley	"All Shook Up"♪ (1957)	RCA Victor	8	
171	June 8, 1957	Pat Boone	"Love Letters In The Sand"	Dot	5	
172	July 13, 1957	Elvis Presley	"(Let Me Be Your) Teddy Bear"	RCA Victor	7	
173	August 31, 1957	Debbie Reynolds	"Tammy"	Coral	3	
174	September 14, 1957	Paul Anka	"Diana"	ABC-Paramount	1	
175	September 28, 1957	The Crickets	"That'll Be The Day"	Brunswick	1	
176	October 5, 1957	Jimmie Rodgers	"Honeycomb"	Roulette	2	
177	October 19, 1957	The Everly Brothers	"Wake Up Little Susie"	Cadence	1	
178	October 26, 1957	Elvis Presley	"Jailhouse Rock"	RCA Victor	7	
179	December 7, 1957	Sam Cooke	"You Send Me"	Keen	2	
180	December 28, 1957	Pat Boone	"April Love"	Dot	2	
1958
181	January 11, 1958	Danny & the Juniors	"At The Hop"	ABC-Paramount	5	
182	February 15, 1958	Elvis Presley	"Don't"	RCA Victor	5	
183	March 22, 1958	The Champs	"Tequila"	Challenge	5	
184	April 26, 1958	The Platters	"Twilight Time"	Mercury	1	
185	May 3, 1958	David Seville	"Witch Doctor"	Liberty	2	
186	May 17, 1958	The Everly Brothers	"All I Have To Do Is Dream"	Cadence	4	
187	June 14, 1958	Sheb Wooley	"The Purple People Eater"	MGM	6	
188	July 26, 1958	Elvis Presley	"Hard Headed Woman"	RCA Victor	2	

== Statistics by decade ==
=== By artist ===
The following artists achieved three or more number-one hits during the 1950–1958. A number of artists had number-one singles on their own as well as part of a collaboration.

Artist	Number-one hits
Elvis Presley	10
Perry Como	4
Patti Page	3
Rosemary Clooney	3
Eddie Fisher	3
Tony Bennett	3

=== Artists by total number of weeks at number-one ===
The following artists were featured in top of the chart for the highest total number of weeks during the 1950–1958.

Artist	Weeks at number-one
Elvis Presley	57
Patti Page	22
Tony Bennett	20
Perry Como	20
Les Paul and Mary Ford	20
Rosemary Clooney	13
Eddie Fisher	13

=== Songs by total number of weeks at number-one ===
The following songs were featured in top of the chart for the highest total number of weeks during the 1950–1958.

13	"Goodnight Irene"	Gordon Jenkins and The Weavers
11	"Don't Be Cruel" / "Hound Dog"	Elvis Presley
11	"Vaya Con Dios"	Les Paul and Mary Ford
11	"Cry"	Johnnie Ray and The Four Lads
11	"The Third Man Theme"	Anton Karas

== See also ==
- List of Billboard number-one singles
- 1950s in music
