= List of Cash Box Best Sellers number-one singles of 1953 =

These are the songs that reached number one on the Top 50 Best Sellers chart in 1953 as published by Cash Box magazine.

Issue date	Song	Artist
January 3	"I Saw Mommy Kissing Santa Claus"	Jimmy Boyd
January 10	"Why Don't You Believe Me"	Joni James
January 17	"Don't Let The Stars Get In Your Eyes"	Perry Como
January 24	"Don't Let The Stars Get In Your Eyes"	Perry Como
January 31	"Don't Let The Stars Get In Your Eyes"	Perry Como
February 7	"Till I Waltz Again with You"	Teresa Brewer
February 14	"Till I Waltz Again with You"	Teresa Brewer
February 21	"Till I Waltz Again with You"	Teresa Brewer
February 28	"Till I Waltz Again with You"	Teresa Brewer
March 7	"Till I Waltz Again with You"	Teresa Brewer
March 14	"Till I Waltz Again with You"	Teresa Brewer
March 21	"The Doggie in the Window"	Patti Page
March 28	"The Doggie in the Window"	Patti Page
April 4	"The Doggie in the Window"	Patti Page
April 11	"The Doggie in the Window"	Patti Page
April 18	"The Doggie in the Window"	Patti Page
April 25	"The Doggie in the Window"	Patti Page
May 2	"The Doggie in the Window"	Patti Page
May 9	"The Song from Moulin Rouge"	Percy Faith & Orchestra
May 16	"The Song from Moulin Rouge"	Percy Faith & Orchestra
May 23	"The Song from Moulin Rouge"	Percy Faith & Orchestra
May 30	"The Song from Moulin Rouge"	Percy Faith & Orchestra
June 6	"The Song from Moulin Rouge"	Percy Faith & Orchestra
June 13	"The Song from Moulin Rouge"	Percy Faith & Orchestra
June 20	"The Song from Moulin Rouge"	Percy Faith & Orchestra
June 27	"The Song from Moulin Rouge"	Percy Faith & Orchestra
July 4	"I'm Walking Behind You"	Eddie Fisher
July 11	"I'm Walking Behind You"	Eddie Fisher
July 18	"I'm Walking Behind You"	Eddie Fisher
July 25	"I'm Walking Behind You"	Eddie Fisher
August 1	"I'm Walking Behind You"	Eddie Fisher
August 8	"I'm Walking Behind You"	Eddie Fisher
August 15	"No Other Love"	Perry Como
August 22	"Vaya con Dios (May God Be With You)"	Les Paul and Mary Ford
August 29	"Vaya con Dios (May God Be With You)"	Les Paul and Mary Ford
September 5	"Crying in the Chapel"	June Valli
September 12	"Vaya con Dios (May God Be With You)"	Les Paul and Mary Ford
September 19	"Crying in the Chapel"	June Valli, Darrell Glenn, Rex Allen, The Orioles
September 26	"Crying in the Chapel"	June Valli, Darrell Glenn, Rex Allen, The Orioles
October 3	"You, You, You"	The Ames Brothers
October 10	"Vaya con Dios (May God Be With You)"	Les Paul and Mary Ford
October 17	"Vaya con Dios (May God Be With You)"	Les Paul and Mary Ford
October 24	"St. George and the Dragonet"	Stan Freberg
October 31	"St. George and the Dragonet"	Stan Freberg
November 7	"St. George and the Dragonet"	Stan Freberg
November 14	"Rags to Riches"	Tony Bennett
November 21	"Eh, Cumpari"	Julius La Rosa
November 28	"Rags to Riches"	Tony Bennett
December 5	"Rags to Riches"	Tony Bennett
December 12	"Rags to Riches"	Tony Bennett
December 19	"Rags to Riches"	Tony Bennett
December 26	"Oh My Pa-Pa (O Mein Papa)"	Eddie Fisher, Eddie Calvert

== See also ==
- 1953 in music
- List of number-one singles of 1953 (U.S.)
