= Billboard year-end top 30 singles of 1953 =

Ranking of recorded music

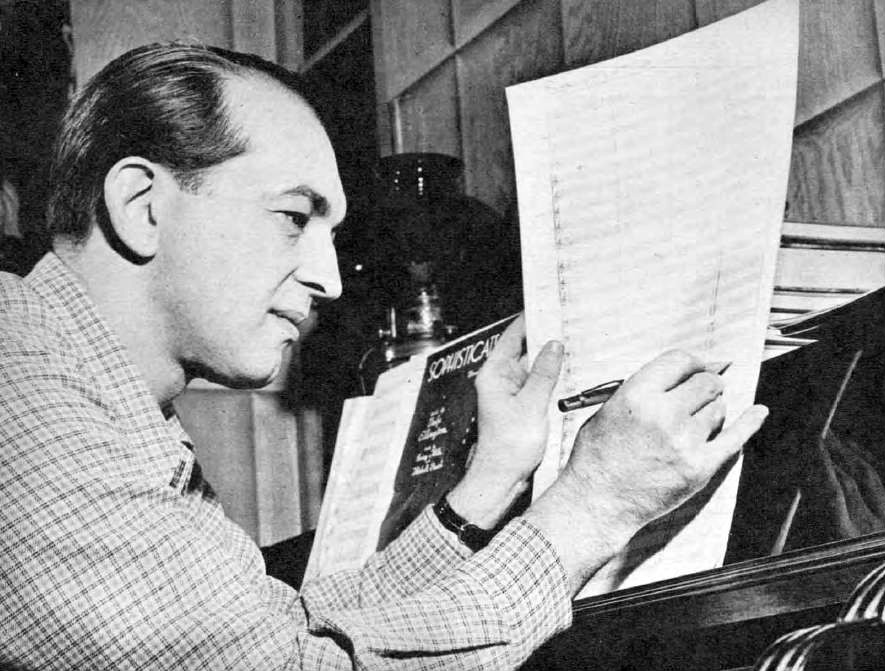
"The Song from Moulin Rouge" by Percy Faith (pictured) featuring Felicia Sanders was the number one song of 1953.

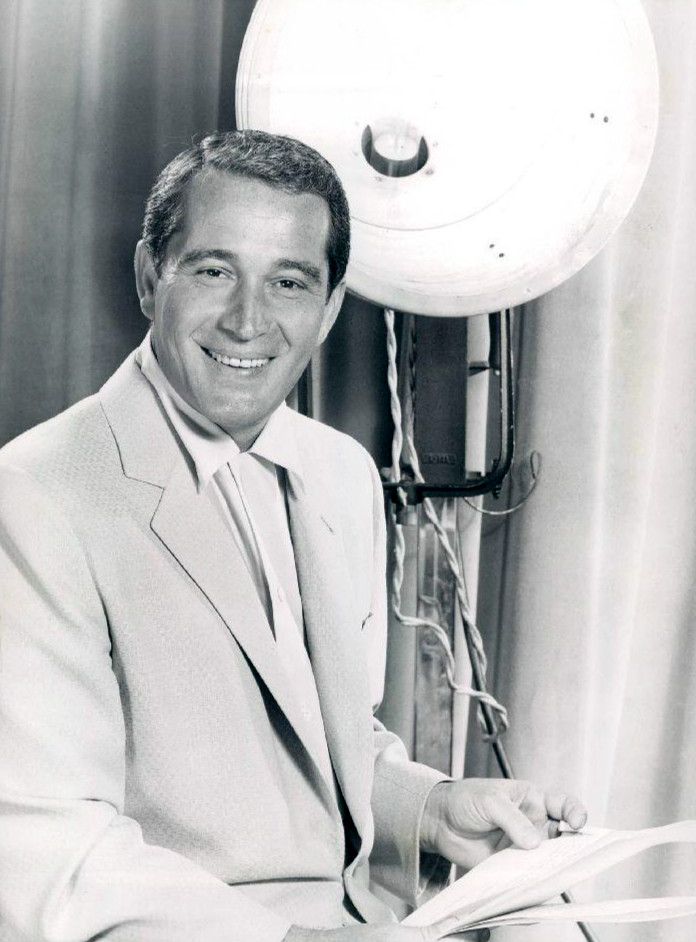
Perry Como had three songs on the year-end top 30.

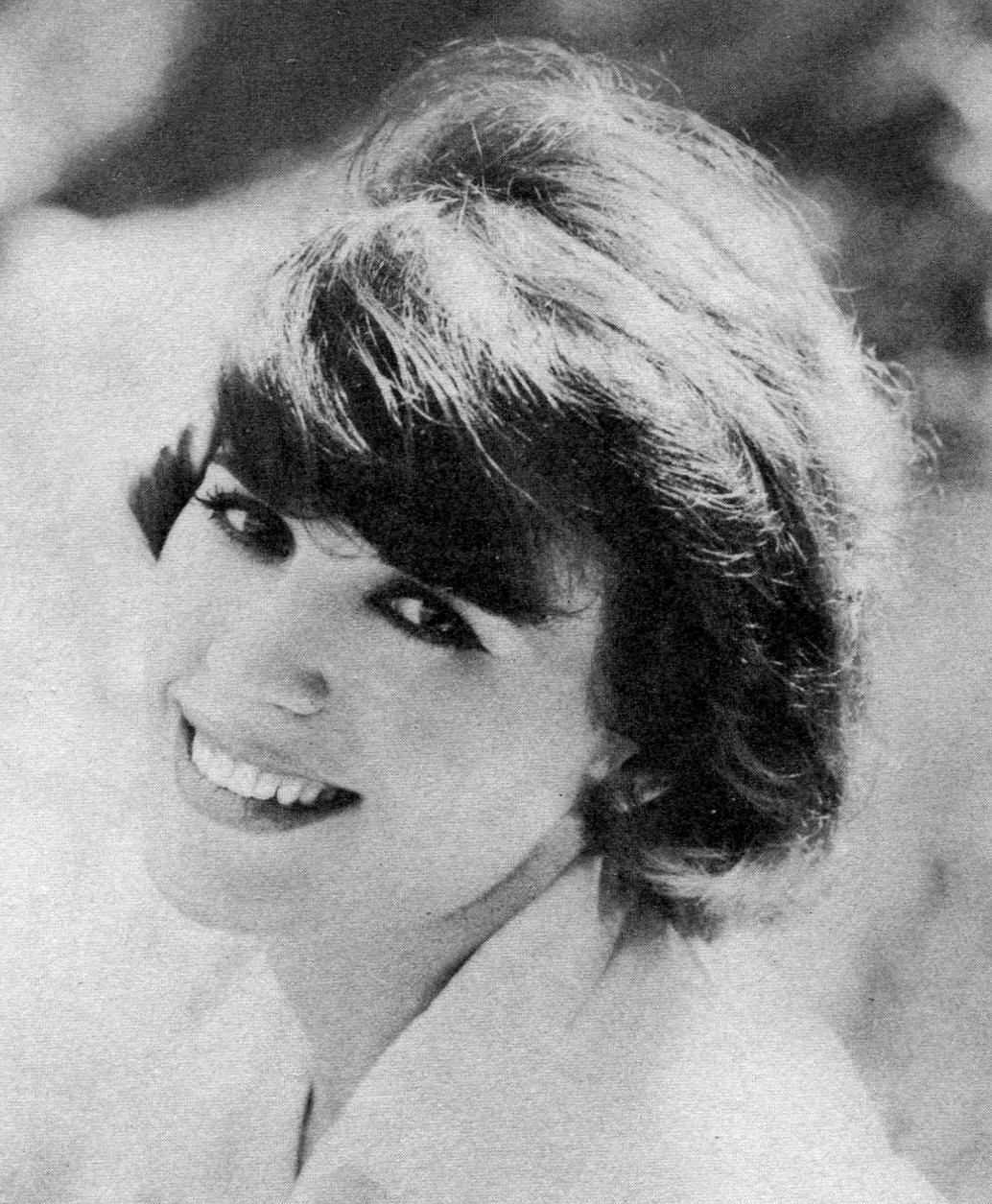
Joni James had three songs on the year-end top 30.

This is a list of Billboard magazine's top popular songs of 1953 by retail sales.

No.	Title	Artist(s)
1	"The Song from Moulin Rouge"	Percy Faith featuring Felicia Sanders
2	"Vaya con Dios"	Les Paul and Mary Ford
3	"(How Much Is) That Doggie in the Window?"	Patti Page
4	"I'm Walking Behind You"	Eddie Fisher with Hugo Winterhalter
5	"You, You, You"	Ames Brothers with Hugo Winterhalter
6	"Till I Waltz Again with You"	Teresa Brewer with Jack Pleis
7	"April in Portugal"	Les Baxter
8	"No Other Love"	Perry Como with Henri René
9	"Don't Let the Stars Get in Your Eyes"	Perry Como
10	"I Believe"	Frankie Laine with Paul Weston
11	"Oh"	Pee Wee Hunt
12	"Ebb Tide"	Frank Chacksfield
13	"Pretend"	Nat King Cole with Nelson Riddle
14	"Ruby"	Richard Hayman
15	"St. George and the Dragonet"	Stan Freberg
16	"P.S. I Love You"	The Hilltoppers
17	"Tell Me You're Mine"	The Gaylords
18	"Eh, Cumpari!"	Julius La Rosa
19	"Rags to Riches"	Tony Bennett with Percy Faith
20	"Anna"	Silvana Mangano
21	"Say You're Mine Again"	Perry Como
22	"Dragnet"	Ray Anthony
23	"Tell Me a Story"	Jimmy Boyd & Frankie Laine
24	"Crying in the Chapel"	June Valli
25	"Why Don't You Believe Me?"	Joni James with Lew Douglas
26	"Your Cheatin' Heart"	Joni James with Lew Douglas
27	"Limelight (Terry's Theme)"	Frank Chacksfield
28	"With These Hands"	Eddie Fisher with Hugo Winterhalter
29	"C'est si bon"	Eartha Kitt with Henri René
30	"Have You Heard?"	Joni James with the Jack Halloran Choir and Lew Douglas

== See also ==
- 1953 in music
- List of Billboard number-one singles of 1953
