= List of Cash Box Best Sellers number-one singles of 1954 =

These are the songs that reached number one on the Top 50 Best Sellers chart in 1954 as published by Cash Box magazine.

| Issue date | Song | Artist |
|---|---|---|
| January 2 | "Oh My Pa-Pa (O Mein Papa)" | Eddie Fisher, Eddie Calvert |
| January 9 | "Oh My Pa-Pa (O Mein Papa)" | Eddie Fisher, Eddie Calvert |
| January 16 | "Oh My Pa-Pa (O Mein Papa)" | Eddie Fisher, Eddie Calvert |
| January 23 | "Oh My Pa-Pa (O Mein Papa)" | Eddie Fisher, Eddie Calvert |
| January 30 | "Oh My Pa-Pa (O Mein Papa)" | Eddie Fisher, Eddie Calvert |
| February 6 | "Stranger in Paradise" | Tony Bennett, The Four Aces, Tony Martin |
| February 13 | "Oh My Pa-Pa (O Mein Papa)" | Eddie Fisher, Eddie Calvert |
| February 20 | "Oh My Pa-Pa (O Mein Papa)" | Eddie Fisher, Eddie Calvert |
| February 27 | "Stranger in Paradise" | Tony Bennett, The Four Aces, Tony Martin |
| March 6 | "Secret Love" | Doris Day |
| March 13 | "Secret Love" | Doris Day |
| March 20 | "Secret Love" | Doris Day |
| March 27 | "Secret Love" | Doris Day |
| April 3 | "Secret Love" | Doris Day |
| April 10 | "Wanted" | Perry Como |
| April 17 | "Wanted" | Perry Como |
| April 24 | "Wanted" | Perry Como |
| May 1 | "Wanted" | Perry Como |
| May 8 | "Wanted" | Perry Como |
| May 15 | "Wanted" | Perry Como |
| May 22 | "Wanted" | Perry Como |
| May 29 | "Wanted" | Perry Como |
| June 5 | "Little Things Mean a Lot" | Kitty Kallen |
| June 12 | "Little Things Mean a Lot" | Kitty Kallen |
| June 19 | "Little Things Mean a Lot" | Kitty Kallen |
| June 26 | "Three Coins in the Fountain" | The Four Aces |
| July 3 | "Little Things Mean a Lot" | Kitty Kallen |
| July 10 | "Little Things Mean a Lot" | Kitty Kallen |
| July 17 | "Three Coins in the Fountain" | The Four Aces |
| July 24 | "Little Things Mean a Lot" | Kitty Kallen |
| July 31 | "Little Things Mean a Lot" | Kitty Kallen |
| August 7 | "Sh-Boom" | The Crew Cuts, The Chords |
| August 14 | "Sh-Boom" | The Crew Cuts, The Chords |
| August 21 | "Sh-Boom" | The Crew Cuts, The Chords |
| August 28 | "Sh-Boom" | The Crew Cuts, The Chords |
| September 4 | "Sh-Boom" | The Crew Cuts, The Chords |
| September 11 | "Sh-Boom" | The Crew Cuts, The Chords |
| September 18 | "Sh-Boom" | The Crew Cuts, The Chords |
| September 25 | "Hey There" | Rosemary Clooney, Sammy Davis Jr. |
| October 2 | "Hey There" | Rosemary Clooney, Sammy Davis Jr. |
| October 9 | "Hey There" | Rosemary Clooney, Sammy Davis Jr. |
| October 16 | "Hey There" | Rosemary Clooney, Sammy Davis Jr. |
| October 23 | "Hey There" | Rosemary Clooney, Sammy Davis Jr. |
| October 30 | "Hey There" | Rosemary Clooney, Sammy Davis Jr. |
| November 6 | "Hey There" | Rosemary Clooney, Sammy Davis Jr. |
| November 13 | "Hey There" | Rosemary Clooney, Sammy Davis Jr. |
| November 20 | "I Need You Now" | Eddie Fisher |
| November 27 | "I Need You Now" | Eddie Fisher |
| December 4 | "Mr. Sandman" | The Chordettes |
| December 11 | "Mr. Sandman" | The Chordettes, The Four Aces |
| December 18 | "Let Me Go, Lover!" | Joan Weber |
| December 25 | "Mr. Sandman" | The Chordettes, The Four Aces |

== See also ==
- 1954 in music
- List of number-one singles of 1954 (U.S.)
