= Christmas Comes But Once a Year (disambiguation) =

Christmas Comes But Once a Year may refer to:

- Christmas Comes But Once a Year, a 1936 animated film by Fleischer Studios
- "Christmas Comes but Once a Year" (song) by Stan Freberg in 1958 radio play Green Chri$tma$
- "Christmas Comes But Once a Year" (Mad Men), 2010 television episode
- A precept among the "Five Hundredth Pointes of Good Husbandrie", a 1573 book by Thomas Tusser
