= Say You're Mine Again =

Single by Perry Como
- B-side: "My One and Only Heart"
- Released: March 1953
- Genre: Pop
- Length: 2:55
- Label: RCA Victor
- Songwriters: Charles Nathan, Dave Heisler

Perry Como singles chronology
"Wild Horses" (1953)	"Say You're Mine Again" (1953)	"No Other Love" (1953)

"Say You're Mine Again" is a song written by Charles Nathan and Dave Heisler and performed by Perry Como featuring The Ramblers. It reached number 3 on the U.S. pop chart in 1953.

The song ranked at number 21 on Billboard's Year-End top 30 singles of 1953.

== Other charting versions ==
- June Hutton and Axel Stordahl released a version of the song which reached number 6 on the UK Singles Chart and number 21 on the U.S. pop chart in 1953.

== Other versions ==
- Dolores Gray released a version of the song as the B-side to her 1953 single "Big Mamou".
- Eddy Howard and His Orchestra released a version of the song as a single in 1953, but it did not chart.
- The Modernaires featuring the Fran Scott Orchestra released a version of the song as a single in 1953, but it did not chart.
- Vic Dana released a version of the song on his 1965 album, Moonlight and Roses.
- Ronnie Dio & The Prophets released a version of the song as a single in 1965, but it did not chart.
