= Stan Freberg Presents the United States of America Volume One: The Early Years =

1961 album by Stan Freberg

Studio album by Stan Freberg
- Released: 1961
- Genre: Comedy
- Length: 47:49 (LP); 56:03 (CD)
- Label: Capitol
- Producer: Ken Nelson

Professional ratings
Review scores
Source	Rating
New Record Mirror	5/5

Stan Freberg Presents the United States of America Volume One: The Early Years is a 1961 American comedy album with music and lyrics written by Stan Freberg and sketches written by Freberg and Ken Sullett, released as Capitol W/SW-1573 in 1961. Freberg satirizes episodes of the history of the United States from 1492 until the end of the Revolutionary War in 1783. The album combined dialogue and song in a musical theater format. Billy May orchestrated and conducted the music, with the Jud Conlon Singers providing background vocals.

== Cast ==
In addition to Freberg, the cast included the following performers:

- Jesse White
- Peter Leeds
- Byron Kane
- Colleen Collins
- Helen Kleeb
- Shep Menken
- Walter Tetley
- Marvin Miller
- June Foray
- Barney Phillips
- Maurice Dallimore
- Peter Forster
- John Frank
- Paul Frees (narrator)

== Notes ==
Freberg used anachronistic and self-referential humour in these sketches, such as referring to the Fourth of July weekend in the "Declaration of Independence" sketch, Thanksgiving Day in the skit on "Take an Indian to Lunch" as well as the "Thanksgiving Turkey" portion, and Columbus Day in "Columbus Discovers America". Freberg also satirized McCarthyism in the "Declaration of Independence" sketch, for example where Benjamin Franklin says, "You . . . sign a harmless petition, and forget all about it; ten years later, you get hauled up before a committee."

== Legacy ==
Admirers of this album have included Steven Spielberg, Richard Dreyfuss and Paul McCartney. Dr. Demento's listeners have repeatedly voted The United States of America as the greatest comedy album of all time.

In 2019, Stan Freberg Presents the United States of America Volume One: The Early Years was selected for preservation in the National Recording Registry as "culturally, historically, and aesthetically significant" by the Library of Congress.

== Track listing ==
1. Overture
2. "Columbus Discovers America: It's a Round, Round World"
3. "Pilgrim's Progress: Take an Indian to Lunch"
4. "Thanksgiving Story (Under the Double Turkey)"
5. "Sale of Manhattan: Top Hat, White Feather, and Tails"
6. "Boston Tea Party"
7. "Declaration of Independence: A Man Can't Be Too Careful What He Signs These Days"
8. "Midnight Ride of Paul Revere" [not on original LP]
9. "Betsy Ross and the Flag: Everybody Wants to Be an Art Director" [slightly longer version than original LP]
10. "Discovery of Electricity" [not on original LP]
11. "Washington Crosses the Delaware (Command Decision)"
12. "Yankee Doodle Go Home (Spirit of '76)"
13. "Battle of Yorktown"
14. Finale: "So Long, Friend"

== Volume 2 ==
Stan Freberg Presents the United States of America Volume Two: The Middle Years

Studio album by Stan Freberg
- Released: 1996
- Genre: Comedy
- Label: Rhino Records
- Producers: Donna Freberg; Stan Freberg

Stan Freberg Presents the United States of America, Volume Two was planned for a release during America's Bicentennial in 1976, but did not emerge until 1996. In his autobiography, Freberg detailed his efforts to have the songs and skits produced on Broadway; when this failed, he used material omitted from the original album in the sequel.

Besides Freberg, the cast for this volume included:

- Peter Leeds
- Jesse White
- June Foray
- Lorenzo Music
- David Ogden Stiers
- Donavan Freberg
- Donna Freberg Ebsen
- Naomi Lewis
- Bill Woodson
- Harry Shearer
- Tyne Daly
- Sherman Hemsley
- John Goodman
- Corey Burton (narrator)

Freberg originally intended for Leeds, White, Byron Kane, and Paul Frees to all return, but Kane and Frees had died and White could only appear in a cameo role. Lorenzo Music, David Ogden Stiers, and Corey Burton filled the parts originally meant for Kane, White, and Frees respectively. Fayard Nicholas also recorded tap dancing sounds for the record. Billy May once again arranged and conducted the music.

A third volume was planned. Due to the death of Freberg's wife, Donna, and Freberg's personal health problems, the project was shelved.
