= The Stan Freberg Federal Budget Review =

1980 television special

- Genre: Musical; Comedy
- Written by: Stan Freberg
- Directed by: Stan Freberg
- Starring: Stan Freberg; Millicent Martin; David Ogden Stiers; Naomi Lewis; Ray Bradbury; Sterling Holloway; Byron Kane
- Music by: Stan Freberg (songs); Billy May (musical director)
- Country of origin: United States
- Original language: English

Production
- Executive producer: Bob Chitester
- Producer: Stan Freberg
- Running time: 28 minutes
- Production companies: Public Communications, Inc.

Original release
- Network: PBS
- Release: 1980

The Stan Freberg Federal Budget Review is a 1980 musical comedy television special lampooning the federal government of the United States of America that aired on PBS. It starred Stan Freberg, who also wrote, produced, and directed the special, as well as writing its songs. The special's executive producer was Bob Chitester.
