= John and Marsha =

1951 comedy single by Stan Freberg

Single by Stan Freberg
- Released: February 8, 1951
- Genre: Comedy; soap opera-satire
- Length: 2:34
- Label: Capitol Records
- Songwriter: Stan Freberg
- Producer: Century Songs

Audio
- “John and Marsha” on YouTube

"John and Marsha" is a 1951 American novelty comedy single written and performed by Stan Freberg and released on Capitol Records. Consisting of only two words: "John" and "Marsha", the recording is a back-and-forth dialogue between a man and a woman ranging in varied emotion. It was made into an award-winning commercial by producer-director John Hubley and animator Art Babbitt and aired on television in 1956.

== History ==
Stan Freberg began his career as a voice actor and impersonator on radio, television and film. By 1951, he started making comedy records for Capitol Records. His first recording was "John and Marsha", a parody of the radio soap operas from the day that consisted of a male and female character (Freberg voiced both) saying each other's name over and over to one another in different emotional inflections.

Upon its release, "John and Marsha" reached number 21 on the charts and stayed there for three weeks in total. Freberg followed the success of "John and Marsha" with parodies of Cole Porter's "I've Got You Under My Skin" and "Cry" by Johnnie Ray. It was reported that certain radio stations would not play the record for reasons that they thought it was a real intimate conversation between a man and a woman.

In 1956, producer John Hubley and animator Art Babbitt created a commercial showreel for Wesson Oil Snowdrift shortening using Freberg's character names: John and Marsha. The animated short depicted a married couple addressing each other in similar fashion as the comedy single but with the added: "Snowdrift" as a sponsor tag line. It won the New York Art Directors Award for Best Animated Short in June 1956.

As a sequel to "John and Marsha", on the B-side of "C'est Si Bon (It's So Good)", Freberg released "A Dear John & Marsha Letter" on December 7, 1953 on Capitol Records.

== Legacy ==
Various animated works use a variant of the record as background noise or a sight gag.

- The 1954 Merrie Melodies short The Wild Wife depicts a couple named "John" and "Marsha". The short was directed by Robert McKimson and produced by Warner Bros. Cartoons, where Freberg worked as a voice actor.
- The 1957 short Bedevilled Rabbit, the Tasmanian devil and Bugs (impersonating a "Tasmanian she-devil") call each other John and Marsha.
- The Teenage Mutant Ninja Turtles episode "The Ninja Sword of Nowhere" features a "John" and "Marsha" duo as part of an in-show soap opera series enjoyed by Krang.
- The 2004 animated film Teacher's Pet features a scene with a television soap opera with the onscreen actors "John" and "Marsha". Later, there's a telenovela using "Juan" and "Marcía".
- The opening credits sequence of the 1961 film The Parent Trap features a stop-motion animated couple named John and Marsha, and referencing each other by name twice just as in the Freberg record.
- During the first two seasons of Batman, Carolyn Jones played a femme fatale recurring villain named Marsha, Queen of Diamonds, who would engage Batman with these exchanges while trying to amorously manipulate him to her will.
- In July 2010, on the fourth season premiere of Mad Men, Peggy and Joey (Elisabeth Moss and Matt Long) continually call out to one another: "John!" and "Marsha!" in similar tones while they work on an ad campaign together.
- The track "Falcor vs. Atreyu (Classy Skit #1)" from the 2011 The Lonely Island album Turtleneck & Chain is partially inspired by the Freburg record.
