= List of Billboard number-one singles of 1953 =

This is a list of number-one songs in the United States during the year 1953 according to Billboard magazine. Prior to the creation of the Billboard Hot 100, Billboard published multiple singles charts each week. In 1953, the following three charts were produced:

- Best Sellers in Stores – ranked the biggest selling singles in retail stores, as reported by merchants surveyed throughout the country.
- Most Played by Jockeys – ranked the most played songs on United States radio stations, as reported by radio disc jockeys and radio stations.
- Most Played in Jukeboxes – ranked the most played songs in jukeboxes across the United States.
- Honor Roll of Hits – a composite ten-position song chart which combined data from the three charts above along with three other component charts. It served as The Billboard's lead chart until the introduction of the Hot 100 in 1958 and would remain in print until 1963.

Issue date	Best Sellers in Stores	Most Played by Jockeys	Most Played in Jukeboxes	Honor Roll of Hits	Ref.
January 3	"I Saw Mommy Kissing Santa Claus"; Jimmy Boyd with The Norman Luboff Choir	"Why Don't You Believe Me"; Joni James with Orchestra conducted by Lew Douglas	"Why Don't You Believe Me"; Joni James with Orchestra conducted by Lee Douglas	"Why Don't You Believe Me?"	
January 10	"Don't Let the Stars Get in Your Eyes"; Perry Como with The Ramblers	"Why Don't You Believe Me"; Joni James with Orchestra conducted by Lew Douglas	"Why Don't You Believe Me"; Joni James with Orchestra conducted by Lee Douglas	"Why Don't You Believe Me?"	
January 17	"Don't Let the Stars Get in Your Eyes"; Perry Como with The Ramblers	"Why Don't You Believe Me"; Joni James with Orchestra conducted by Lew Douglas	"Don't Let the Stars Get in Your Eyes"; Perry Como with The Ramblers	"Don't Let the Stars Get in Your Eyes"	
January 24	"Don't Let the Stars Get in Your Eyes"; Perry Como with The Ramblers	"Don't Let the Stars Get in Your Eyes"; Perry Como with The Ramblers	"Don't Let the Stars Get in Your Eyes"; Perry Como with The Ramblers	"Don't Let the Stars Get in Your Eyes"	
January 31	"Don't Let the Stars Get in Your Eyes"; Perry Como with The Ramblers	"Don't Let the Stars Get in Your Eyes"; Perry Como with The Ramblers	"Don't Let the Stars Get in Your Eyes"; Perry Como with The Ramblers	"Don't Let the Stars Get in Your Eyes"	
February 7	"Don't Let the Stars Get in Your Eyes"; Perry Como with The Ramblers	"Don't Let the Stars Get in Your Eyes"; Perry Como with The Ramblers	"Don't Let the Stars Get in Your Eyes"; Perry Como with The Ramblers	"Don't Let the Stars Get in Your Eyes"	
February 14	"Till I Waltz Again with You"; Teresa Brewer with Orchestra directed by Jack Pleis	"Till I Waltz Again with You"; Teresa Brewer with Orchestra directed by Jack Pleis	"Till I Waltz Again with You"; Teresa Brewer with Orchestra directed by Jack Pleis	"Till I Waltz Again with You"	
February 21	"Till I Waltz Again with You"; Teresa Brewer with Orchestra directed by Jack Pleis	"Till I Waltz Again with You"; Teresa Brewer with Orchestra directed by Jack Pleis	"Till I Waltz Again with You"; Teresa Brewer with Orchestra directed by Jack Pleis	"Till I Waltz Again with You"	
February 28	"Till I Waltz Again with You"; Teresa Brewer with Orchestra directed by Jack Pleis	"Till I Waltz Again with You"; Teresa Brewer with Orchestra directed by Jack Pleis	"Till I Waltz Again with You"; Teresa Brewer with Orchestra directed by Jack Pleis	"Till I Waltz Again with You"	
March 7	"Till I Waltz Again with You"; Teresa Brewer with Orchestra directed by Jack Pleis	"Till I Waltz Again with You"; Teresa Brewer with Orchestra directed by Jack Pleis	"Till I Waltz Again with You"; Teresa Brewer with Orchestra directed by Jack Pleis	"Till I Waltz Again with You"	
March 14	"Till I Waltz Again with You"; Teresa Brewer with Orchestra directed by Jack Pleis	"Till I Waltz Again with You"; Teresa Brewer with Orchestra directed by Jack Pleis	"Till I Waltz Again with You"; Teresa Brewer with Orchestra directed by Jack Pleis	"Till I Waltz Again with You"	
March 21	"The Doggie in the Window"; Patti Page with Orchestra Conducted by Jack Rael	"Till I Waltz Again with You"; Teresa Brewer with Orchestra directed by Jack Pleis	"Till I Waltz Again with You"; Teresa Brewer with Orchestra directed by Jack Pleis	"Till I Waltz Again with You"	
March 28	"The Doggie in the Window"; Patti Page with Orchestra Conducted by Jack Rael	"The Doggie in the Window"; Patti Page with Orchestra Conducted by Jack Rael	"The Doggie in the Window"; Patti Page with Orchestra Conducted by Jack Rael	"Doggie in the Window"	
April 4	"The Doggie in the Window"; Patti Page with Orchestra Conducted by Jack Rael	"The Doggie in the Window"; Patti Page with Orchestra Conducted by Jack Rael	"Till I Waltz Again with You"; Teresa Brewer with Orchestra directed by Jack Pleis	"Doggie in the Window"	
April 11	"The Doggie in the Window"; Patti Page with Orchestra Conducted by Jack Rael	"The Doggie in the Window"; Patti Page with Orchestra Conducted by Jack Rael	"The Doggie in the Window"; Patti Page with Orchestra Conducted by Jack Rael	"Doggie in the Window"	
April 18	"The Doggie in the Window"; Patti Page with Orchestra Conducted by Jack Rael	"The Doggie in the Window"; Patti Page with Orchestra Conducted by Jack Rael	"The Doggie in the Window"; Patti Page with Orchestra Conducted by Jack Rael	"Doggie in the Window"	
April 25	"The Doggie in the Window"; Patti Page with Orchestra Conducted by Jack Rael	"The Doggie in the Window"; Patti Page with Orchestra Conducted by Jack Rael	"The Doggie in the Window"; Patti Page with Orchestra Conducted by Jack Rael	"Doggie in the Window"	
May 2	"The Doggie in the Window"; Patti Page with Orchestra Conducted by Jack Rael	"The Doggie in the Window"; Patti Page with Orchestra Conducted by Jack Rael	"The Doggie in the Window"; Patti Page with Orchestra Conducted by Jack Rael	"Doggie in the Window"	
May 9	"The Doggie in the Window"; Patti Page with Orchestra Conducted by Jack Rael	"The Doggie in the Window"; Patti Page with Orchestra Conducted by Jack Rael	"The Doggie in the Window"; Patti Page with Orchestra Conducted by Jack Rael	"Doggie in the Window"	
May 16	"The Song from Moulin Rouge (Where Is Your Heart)"; Percy Faith & his Orchestra featuring Felicia Sanders	"The Song from Moulin Rouge (Where Is Your Heart)"; Percy Faith & his Orchestra featuring Felicia Sanders	"The Doggie in the Window"; Patti Page with Orchestra Conducted by Jack Rael	"Song from Moulin Rouge"	
May 23	"The Song from Moulin Rouge (Where Is Your Heart)"; Percy Faith & his Orchestra featuring Felicia Sanders	"The Song from Moulin Rouge (Where Is Your Heart)"; Percy Faith & his Orchestra featuring Felicia Sanders	"The Song from Moulin Rouge (Where Is Your Heart)"; Percy Faith & his Orchestra featuring Felicia Sanders	"Song from Moulin Rouge"	
May 30	"The Song from Moulin Rouge (Where Is Your Heart)"; Percy Faith & his Orchestra featuring Felicia Sanders	"The Song from Moulin Rouge (Where Is Your Heart)"; Percy Faith & his Orchestra featuring Felicia Sanders	"The Song from Moulin Rouge (Where Is Your Heart)"; Percy Faith & his Orchestra featuring Felicia Sanders	"Song from Moulin Rouge"	
June 6	"The Song from Moulin Rouge (Where Is Your Heart)"; Percy Faith & his Orchestra featuring Felicia Sanders	"The Song from Moulin Rouge (Where Is Your Heart)"; Percy Faith & his Orchestra featuring Felicia Sanders	"The Song from Moulin Rouge (Where Is Your Heart)"; Percy Faith & his Orchestra featuring Felicia Sanders	"Song from Moulin Rouge"	
June 13	"The Song from Moulin Rouge (Where Is Your Heart)"; Percy Faith & his Orchestra featuring Felicia Sanders	"The Song from Moulin Rouge (Where Is Your Heart)"; Percy Faith & his Orchestra featuring Felicia Sanders	"The Song from Moulin Rouge (Where Is Your Heart)"; Percy Faith & his Orchestra featuring Felicia Sanders	"Song from Moulin Rouge"	
June 20	"The Song from Moulin Rouge (Where Is Your Heart)"; Percy Faith & his Orchestra featuring Felicia Sanders	"The Song from Moulin Rouge (Where Is Your Heart)"; Percy Faith & his Orchestra featuring Felicia Sanders	"The Song from Moulin Rouge (Where Is Your Heart)"; Percy Faith & his Orchestra featuring Felicia Sanders	"Song from Moulin Rouge"	
June 27	"The Song from Moulin Rouge (Where Is Your Heart)"; Percy Faith & his Orchestra featuring Felicia Sanders	"The Song from Moulin Rouge (Where Is Your Heart)"; Percy Faith & his Orchestra featuring Felicia Sanders	"The Song from Moulin Rouge (Where Is Your Heart)"; Percy Faith & his Orchestra featuring Felicia Sanders	"Song from Moulin Rouge"	
July 4	"The Song from Moulin Rouge (Where Is Your Heart)"; Percy Faith & his Orchestra featuring Felicia Sanders	"The Song from Moulin Rouge (Where Is Your Heart)"; Percy Faith & his Orchestra featuring Felicia Sanders	"I'm Walking Behind You"; Eddie Fisher with Hugo Winterhalter and his Orchestra	"Song from Moulin Rouge"	
July 11	"The Song from Moulin Rouge (Where Is Your Heart)"; Percy Faith & his Orchestra featuring Felicia Sanders	"The Song from Moulin Rouge (Where Is Your Heart)"; Percy Faith & his Orchestra featuring Felicia Sanders	"I'm Walking Behind You"; Eddie Fisher with Hugo Winterhalter and his Orchestra	"Song from Moulin Rouge"	
July 18	"The Song from Moulin Rouge (Where Is Your Heart)"; Percy Faith & his Orchestra featuring Felicia Sanders	"I'm Walking Behind You"; Eddie Fisher with Hugo Winterhalter and his Orchestra	"I'm Walking Behind You"; Eddie Fisher with Hugo Winterhalter and his Orchestra	"Song from Moulin Rouge"	
July 25	"I'm Walking Behind You"; Eddie Fisher with Hugo Winterhalter and his Orchestra	"I'm Walking Behind You"; Eddie Fisher with Hugo Winterhalter and his Orchestra	"I'm Walking Behind You"; Eddie Fisher with Hugo Winterhalter and his Orchestra	"I'm Walking Behind You"	
August 1	"I'm Walking Behind You"; Eddie Fisher with Hugo Winterhalter and his Orchestra	"I'm Walking Behind You"; Eddie Fisher with Hugo Winterhalter and his Orchestra	"I'm Walking Behind You"; Eddie Fisher with Hugo Winterhalter and his Orchestra	"I'm Walking Behind You"	
August 8	"Vaya con Dios (May God Be with You)"; Les Paul and Mary Ford	"Vaya con Dios (May God Be with You)"; Les Paul and Mary Ford	"I'm Walking Behind You"; Eddie Fisher with Hugo Winterhalter and his Orchestra	"I'm Walking Behind You"	
August 15	"Vaya con Dios (May God Be with You)"; Les Paul and Mary Ford	"No Other Love"; Perry Como with Henri René's Orchestra and Chorus	"I'm Walking Behind You"; Eddie Fisher with Hugo Winterhalter and his Orchestra	"Vaya con Dios"	
August 22	"Vaya con Dios (May God Be with You)"; Les Paul and Mary Ford	"No Other Love"; Perry Como with Henri René's Orchestra and Chorus	"Vaya con Dios (May God Be with You)"; Les Paul and Mary Ford	"Vaya con Dios"	
August 29	"Vaya con Dios (May God Be with You)"; Les Paul and Mary Ford	"No Other Love"; Perry Como with Henri René's Orchestra and Chorus	"Vaya con Dios (May God Be with You)"; Les Paul and Mary Ford	"Vaya con Dios"	
September 5	"Vaya con Dios (May God Be with You)"; Les Paul and Mary Ford	"No Other Love"; Perry Como with Henri René's Orchestra and Chorus	"Vaya con Dios (May God Be with You)"; Les Paul and Mary Ford	"Vaya con Dios"	
September 12	"Vaya con Dios (May God Be with You)"; Les Paul and Mary Ford	"Vaya con Dios (May God Be with You)"; Les Paul and Mary Ford	"Vaya con Dios (May God Be with You)"; Les Paul and Mary Ford	"Vaya con Dios"	
September 19	"Vaya con Dios (May God Be with You)"; Les Paul and Mary Ford	"Vaya con Dios (May God Be with You)"; Les Paul and Mary Ford	"Vaya con Dios (May God Be with You)"; Les Paul and Mary Ford	"Vaya con Dios"	
September 26	"Vaya con Dios (May God Be with You)"; Les Paul and Mary Ford	"You, You, You"; The Ames Brothers with Hugo Winterhalter and his Orchestra	"Vaya con Dios (May God Be with You)"; Les Paul and Mary Ford	"Vaya con Dios"	
October 3	"Vaya con Dios (May God Be with You)"; Les Paul and Mary Ford	"You, You, You"; The Ames Brothers with Hugo Winterhalter and his Orchestra	"Vaya con Dios (May God Be with You)"; Les Paul and Mary Ford	"Vaya con Dios"	
October 10	"St. George and the Dragonet"; Stan Freberg	"You, You, You"; The Ames Brothers with Hugo Winterhalter and his Orchestra	"Vaya con Dios (May God Be with You)"; Les Paul and Mary Ford	"Vaya con Dios"	
October 17	"St. George and the Dragonet"; Stan Freberg	"You, You, You"; The Ames Brothers with Hugo Winterhalter and his Orchestra	"Vaya con Dios (May God Be with You)"; Les Paul and Mary Ford	"Vaya con Dios"	
October 24	"St. George and the Dragonet"; Stan Freberg	"St. George and the Dragonet"^{Stan Freberg}	"You, You, You"; The Ames Brothers with Hugo Winterhalter and his Orchestra	"You, You, You"	
October 31	"St. George and the Dragonet"; Stan Freberg	"You, You, You"; The Ames Brothers with Hugo Winterhalter and his Orchestra	"You, You, You"; The Ames Brothers with Hugo Winterhalter and his Orchestra	"You, You, You"	
November 7	"Vaya con Dios (May God Be with You)"; Les Paul and Mary Ford	"You, You, You"; The Ames Brothers with Hugo Winterhalter and his Orchestra	"You, You, You"; The Ames Brothers with Hugo Winterhalter and his Orchestra	"You, You, You"	
November 14	"Vaya con Dios (May God Be with You)"; Les Paul and Mary Ford	"You, You, You"; The Ames Brothers with Hugo Winterhalter and his Orchestra	"You, You, You"; The Ames Brothers with Hugo Winterhalter and his Orchestra	"You, You, You"	
November 21	"Rags to Riches"; Tony Bennett with Percy Faith and his Orchestra	"You, You, You"; The Ames Brothers with Hugo Winterhalter and his Orchestra	"You, You, You"; The Ames Brothers with Hugo Winterhalter and his Orchestra	"You, You, You"	
November 28	"Rags to Riches"; Tony Bennett with Percy Faith and his Orchestra	"Rags to Riches"; Tony Bennett with Percy Faith and his Orchestra	"You, You, You"; The Ames Brothers with Hugo Winterhalter and his Orchestra	"You, You, You"	
December 5	"Rags to Riches"; Tony Bennett with Percy Faith and his Orchestra	"Rags to Riches"; Tony Bennett with Percy Faith and his Orchestra	"Rags to Riches"; Tony Bennett with Percy Faith and his Orchestra	"Rags to Riches"	
December 12	"Rags to Riches"; Tony Bennett with Percy Faith and his Orchestra	"Rags to Riches"; Tony Bennett with Percy Faith and his Orchestra	"Rags to Riches"; Tony Bennett with Percy Faith and his Orchestra	"Rags to Riches"	
December 19	"Rags to Riches"; Tony Bennett with Percy Faith and his Orchestra	"Rags to Riches"; Tony Bennett with Percy Faith and his Orchestra	"Rags to Riches"; Tony Bennett with Percy Faith and his Orchestra	"Rags to Riches"	
December 26	"Rags to Riches"; Tony Bennett with Percy Faith and his Orchestra	"Rags to Riches"; Tony Bennett with Percy Faith and his Orchestra	"Rags to Riches"; Tony Bennett with Percy Faith and his Orchestra	"Rags to Riches"	

== See also ==
- 1953 in music
