= Green Christmas (Stan Freberg song) =

"Green Chri$tma$"

Single by Stan Freberg
- B-side: "The Meaning of Christmas"
- Released: December 2, 1958
- Genre: Comedy, Christmas
- Length: 6:50
- Label: Capitol Records
- Songwriter: Stan Freberg
- Producer: Ken Nelson

Stan Freberg singles chronology
"Ya Got Trouble" (1958)	"Green Chri$tma$" (1958)	"Omaha!" (1958)

Audio
- “Green Chri$tma$” on YouTube

"Green Chri$tma$" is a comedy single written and performed by Stan Freberg and released by Capitol Records in 1958 (catalog number F 4097). Musical arrangement and direction is made by Billy May, and it is performed by the Capitol Records house orchestra. Other vocal performances are by Daws Butler, Marvin Miller, Will Wright, and the Jud Conlon Chorale.

The title is wordplay on the phrase "green Christmas", a Christmas with no snow, with "green" taking on a double meaning of the green ink uniformly used on U.S. currency. This and the replacement of each "s" in "Christmas" with a U.S. dollar sign refer to the theme of the sketch, the over-commercialization of Christmas. The sketch adapts two characters from Charles Dickens' 1843 novella A Christmas Carol, Ebenezer Scrooge (Freberg) and Bob Cratchit (Butler).

The single developed substantial popularity despite efforts from the advertising agencies of the era to suppress its release and promotion through the usual channels such as radio, print media and television (a few radio stations defied their sales departments, enough for the song to become a regional hit, reaching as high as #3 on Los Angeles radio charts).

== Plot ==
Scrooge, the head of an unnamed advertising agency, has gathered a group of clients to discuss tying their products into Christmas. One client questions this: Bob Cratchit, owner of a spice company. He was planning to send Christmas cards with a simple message of "Peace on Earth, Good Will Toward Men." Scrooge scoffs at this and tells Cratchit that his advertising plan "went out with button shoes". Scrooge then extols exploiting Christmas for profit, including an over-the-top medley of parodies of popular Christmas songs entitled "Deck the Halls with Advertising" that includes an advertisement for "Tyn-E-Tim Chestnuts" that borrows heavily from cigarette advertisements (including "Winston tastes good like a cigarette should") and a toothpaste commercial. Scrooge says, "Christmas has two s's in it, and they're both dollar signs." A disheartened Cratchit counters by reminding Scrooge "whose birthday we're celebrating." However, Scrooge never budges from his position that the true meaning of Christmas is about profit, and that it is now nothing more than "a sales curve. Wake up, Cratchit. It’s later than you think."

== Message ==
"Green Chri$tma$" is a scathing indictment of the commercialization of Christmas, with references of Christmas-themed advertising by Coca-Cola and Marlboro cigarettes, among others. The names of the characters are taken from A Christmas Carol by Charles Dickens, as is one of the products "advertised" ("Tyn-E-Tim Chestnuts," parodying Ty-D-Bol toilet cleaner, a product introduced the year "Green Chri$tma$" was released). The piece also contains a parody of the Christmas carol "The Twelve Days of Christmas" and an original song by Freberg, "Christmas Comes but Once a Year". The single ends with the first phrases of the chorus of "Jingle Bells" interrupted by the sounds of a mechanical cash register, including its bell and coins dropping into its drawer, giving a new meaning to the song.

== Release ==
At first, Capitol Records refused to release the record. Lloyd Dunn, the president of Capitol, told Freberg the record was offensive to everybody in advertising, and predicted that Freberg would never work in advertising again. Freberg responded with his intent to end his entire recording contract with Capitol. He spoke to a contact at Verve Records, and the company offered to release the record without even hearing it. Faced with this, Capitol finally decided to release it but provided no publicity at all. (Note: The B-side is titled "The Meaning of Christmas". It consists only of a Christmas carol medley sung by the Jud Conlon Chorale, with Freberg singing solo on parts of "O Come, All Ye Faithful". This may be the only recording in which Freberg sings something serious.)

== Initial reception ==
The record was attacked in advertising trade magazines. It was played only twice in New York by one disc jockey, and the station's sales department threatened to have him fired if he played it again. George Carlin once told Freberg that he was almost fired from a DJ job in Shreveport, Louisiana for playing the record repeatedly. He told his boss it was "the most moral record ever made." KMPC in Los Angeles played the record, but some advertisers required that their ads be scheduled more than fifteen minutes away from it. An editorial in the Los Angeles Times condemned it, but the author later admitted he had not listened to it. Similarly, Robert Wood, the station manager of KNXT-TV in Los Angeles (later president of CBS), cancelled a TV interview with Freberg because the record was "sacrilegious" and he did not need to hear it because he had read about it. KRLA, Pasadena (Freberg's hometown) showed it as reaching #3 in popularity in their printed survey. It is unclear whether this was based on sales or airplay.

Station KFWB, then known as "Color Radio Channel 98", where the record reached No. 3 on 3 January 1959, also kept on playing it. KFI, then the Earl C. Anthony station, played it a few times and then discontinued it, as did many other stations because of a negative reaction from the advertising community.

However, the mail Freberg received from the public, including rabbis and Christian clergy, was overwhelmingly positive.

== Aftermath ==
Within six months, Coca-Cola and Marlboro, both recognizably satirized in the record without being named, asked Freberg for advertising campaigns. He turned down Marlboro (Freberg, a devout Christian, was adamantly against promoting tobacco and alcohol products), but he created a campaign for Coca-Cola that was very effective. Contrary to the predictions of Lloyd Dunn (see above) and others, Freberg became a prominent figure in advertising himself, producing several iconic advertisements in the 1960s and 1970s.

Some years later, Time magazine was going to publish an essay in their Christmas issue about the overcommercialization of Christmas, including considerable attention to "Green Chri$tma$". The essay was killed at the last minute due to pressure from their sales department.

== Rebroadcast and rerelease ==
Of especially noteworthy importance is the impact of this song's message in the heart of corporate America, as reflected in the fact that it received no commercial AM radio airplay until 1983; only getting a little FM airplay before that (such as on the Doctor Demento Show) and only slightly more AM airtime after 1983, by which point AM radio as a music medium was becoming obsolete. Beginning in 1972, Capitol reissued the single as catalog number 3503, dividing the piece into two parts; it remained in the Christmas singles section of record stores for years thereafter. It can currently be found on Dr. Demento Presents the Greatest Christmas Novelty CD of All Time (1989), as well as several compilations of Freberg's output released by Capitol, including The Very Best of Stan Freberg (1998) and The Capitol Singles Collection (2009).

== Bibliography ==
- Freberg, Stan (1988). It Only Hurts When I Laugh. Times Books. ISBN 0812912977.
- Mirtle, Jack (1998). The Music of Billy May: A Discography. Greenwood Press. ISBN 9780313307393.
