= Felicia Sanders =

American popular music singer (1921–1975)

Felicia Sanders (born Felice Schwartz; April 26, 1921 – February 7, 1975) was a singer and musician of traditional pop.

== Early years ==
Sanders was born in Mount Vernon, New York but was raised in Southern California. She studied merchandising at the University of Southern California.

Sanders married Michael Snider (who was in the Army), and they had a son, Jefferson. During World War II Sanders "decided to give singing a try," thinking it was her duty to sing at camps and hospitals.

== Career ==
In 1950 Sanders sang at Café Gala, a Hollywood nightclub. About this time she recorded some test transcriptions for bandleader Jerry Fielding. She took them to her friend, jazz musician and bandleader Benny Carter, who thought enough of her talent to recommend her to Mitch Miller, Columbia Records' artist and repertory director. She was picked in 1953 by Percy Faith, Columbia's biggest orchestra leader, to perform the vocal on a song he was about to record, taken from the film Moulin Rouge—a biographical film about Toulouse-Lautrec.

"The Song from Moulin Rouge" was recorded on January 22, 1953, as the B-side of a recording of "Swedish Rhapsody". It was Sanders' second record, issued by Columbia with the label credits shown as "Percy Faith and his Orchestra featuring Felicia Sanders." She had been paid only union scale and her name appeared below Faith's in smaller print, but the record became a number one on both the Billboard and Cash Box record charts. The record was to be Sanders' greatest success. Billboard credited the recording as the No. 1 song for 1953.

Just prior to the record's release, Sanders was hired by New York's famous Blue Angel Supper Club, where she appeared in an extended engagement. She was the first singer to perform the pop standard "In Other Words (Fly Me to the Moon)" although Kaye Ballard was the first to record it. Sanders recorded "In Other Words" in 1959 for Decca Records, backed with "Summer Love" (composed by Victor Young). During the 1960s, she sang frequently at The Bon Soir cabaret on West 8th Street.

In 1955, Sanders released her first Columbia album, Felicia Sanders at the Blue Angel.

Miller kept finding other songs for her to record, but only one other scored among the Top 30: "Blue Star", based on the theme from the NBC-TV drama series, Medic.

== Personal life ==
Sanders' marriage to Snider ended in divorce. She married musician Irving Joseph. In the mid-1960s, they formed Special Edition Records, with the first release featuring Sanders' singing.

== Death ==
Felicia Sanders died in her Manhattan home on February 7, 1975, from cancer at the age of 53.
