= The Song from Moulin Rouge =

"The Song from the Moulin Rouge (Where Is Your Heart)"

Single by Mantovani and his Orchestra
- B-side: "Vola Colomba"
- Published: February 6, 1953
- Released: April 1953
- Recorded: March 6, 1953
- Genre: Film score, light music
- Length: 2:32
- Label: Decca Records
- Songwriter: Georges Auric
- Producer: Frank Lee

"The Song from Moulin Rouge (Where Is Your Heart)" is a popular song set to a melody that appeared in the 1952 film Moulin Rouge. It became a No. 1 hit in the UK Singles Chart when recorded by Mantovani. The music for the film was written by Georges Auric; the original French lyrics were by Jacques Larue, with the English words by William Engvick. The Auric-Engvick song was published in 1953.

== Background ==
The melody comes, as its title implies, from the 1952 film Moulin Rouge, but from a different song with unrelated lyrics, "It's April Again." In the film, "It's April Again" was sung by Muriel Smith, dubbing for Zsa Zsa Gabor, who lip-synched to Smith's singing. The film tells the story of the artist Toulouse-Lautrec's time in Montmartre.

== Chart performance and recordings ==
The most popular version of the song in America was made by Percy Faith's Orchestra, with a vocal by Felicia Sanders. The recording by Faith and Sanders was made on January 22, 1953, and released by Columbia Records in both 78 and 45 rpm single formats (catalog numbers 39944 and 4-39944, respectively). It first reached the Billboard chart on March 28, 1953, and lasted 24 weeks on the chart, peaking at No. 1, where it spent ten weeks. This version finished as the No. 1 song for 1953, according to Billboard.

In the United Kingdom, the version by Mantovani and his Orchestra, recorded on March 6, 1953, was the only hit version of the song. On this recording, produced by Frank Lee at Decca, the plaintive accordion theme was played by Henry Krein. Released the same month, it entered the UK singles chart on May 23, 1953, and reached No. 1 on August 14, its twelfth week on chart, for a single week. It was the first instrumental recording to top the UK charts, spending a total of 23 weeks on the listings.

The Mantovani version also charted in the U.S., released by London Records (catalog number 1328). It first reached the Billboard chart on May 16, 1953, and lasted five weeks on the chart, peaking at No. 13.

The song also reached number one on the Cash Box chart, which combined all versions, in 1953. Both Faith's and Mantovani's versions sold over a million copies. Mantovani's original version was included on his 1954 album Romantic Melodies. A stereo re-recording was featured on Waltz Encores, a Mantovani album made for the American market in May 1958 and released there the same year.

"The Song from the Moulin Rouge" entered the UK's sheet music sales chart on May 16, 1953, and reached No. 1 for a week on June 20. It subsequently spent 18 weeks at No. 2, 17 of which were spent consecutively behind "The Theme from Limelight", with an additional week behind "Poppa Piccolino". It spent a total of 38 weeks on the sheet music chart. The first available recording in the UK was Mantovani's, issued in March, and a number of other contemporary versions were subsequently released over the next few months, by the following artists:

- Percy Faith and his Orchestra (vocal by Felicia Sanders)
- June Hutton and Axel Stordahl with The Stordahl Orchestra
- Ron Goodwin and his Concert Orchestra
- Norrie Paramor and his Orchestra
- Henri René and his Orchestra (sax solo: Alvy West)
- Jean Sablon with The Melachrino Strings
- Buddy DeFranco (clarinet) with orchestra conducted by Richard Maltby
- Victor Young and his Singing Strings
- Victor Silvester and his Ballroom Orchestra
- Leslie A. Hutchinson – 'Hutch'
- Ethel Smith (organ)
- Line Renaud

In all, there were 13 versions available in the UK, including a mixture of instrumental and vocal renditions. The recording by Henri René and His Orchestra was made at Manhattan Center, New York City, on March 20, 1953. It was released by RCA Victor Records (catalog number 20-5264) in the U.S. and by EMI on the His Master's Voice label (catalog number B 10483).

== Other contemporary versions ==
Victor Skaarup wrote the Danish lyrics. The Danish title is "Sangen fra Moulin Rouge". Raquel Rastenni with Hans Peder Åse's orchestra recorded it in Copenhagen in 1953. The song was released on His Master's Voice X 8136.

In Australia, The Mastertouch Piano Roll Company released a player-piano roll version, number AD 4716, in 1953.

== Later recordings ==
- Connie Francis included the song on her album Connie Francis Sings "Never on Sunday" (1961).
- Ray Conniff and his Orchestra & Chorus released an instrumental version on their 1963 album The Happy Beat.
- Jerry Vale recorded it for his album The Language of Love (1963).
- Pat Boone recorded it for the album Days of Wine and Roses (1963).
- The Norman Luboff Choir released a version of the song on their 1964 album Great Movie Themes.
- Andy Williams released a version of the song on his 1964 album The Academy Award–Winning "Call Me Irresponsible" and Other Hit Songs from the Movies.
- Al Hirt's version was included on his 1965 album They're Playing Our Song.
- Cliff Richard's version was included on an EP, Look in My Eyes, Maria (1965).
- John Gary recorded it for his album The One and Only John Gary (1966).
- Peters and Lee released a version of "Song From Moulin Rouge" which reached No. 23 on the Dutch Top 40 chart in 1977.
- Jonathan Richman's version was the last song on the album Modern Lovers '88. There are no lyrics in this version; Richman hummed the vocal melody.

== See also ==
- List of number-one singles from the 1950s (UK)
- List of number-one singles of 1953 (U.S.)
