= List of Billboard number-one singles of 1954 =

This is a list of number-one songs in the United States during the year 1954 according to Billboard magazine. Prior to the creation of the Billboard Hot 100, Billboard published multiple singles charts each week. In 1954, the following four charts were produced:

- Best Sellers in Stores – ranked the biggest selling singles in retail stores, as reported by merchants surveyed throughout the country.
- Most Played by Jockeys – ranked the most played songs on United States radio stations, as reported by radio disc jockeys and radio stations.
- Most Played in Jukeboxes – ranked the most played songs in jukeboxes across the United States.
- Honor Roll of Hits – a composite ten-position song chart which combined data from the three charts above along with three other component charts. It served as The Billboard's lead chart until the introduction of the Hot 100 in 1958 and would remain in print until 1963.

Issue date	Best Sellers in Stores	Most Played by Jockeys	Most Played in Jukeboxes	Honor Roll of Hits	Ref.
January 2	"Oh! My Pa-Pa (O Mein Papa)"; Eddie Fisher with Hugo Winterhalter's Orchestra and Chorus	"Rags to Riches"; Tony Bennett with Percy Faith and his Orchestra	"Rags to Riches"; Tony Bennett with Percy Faith and his Orchestra	"Rags to Riches"	
January 9	"Oh! My Pa-Pa (O Mein Papa)"; Eddie Fisher with Hugo Winterhalter's Orchestra and Chorus	"Rags to Riches"; Tony Bennett with Percy Faith and his Orchestra	"Rags to Riches"; Tony Bennett with Percy Faith and his Orchestra	"Oh, Mein Papa (Oh, My Papa)"	
January 16	"Oh! My Pa-Pa (O Mein Papa)"; Eddie Fisher with Hugo Winterhalter's Orchestra and Chorus	"Oh! My Pa-Pa (O Mein Papa)"; Eddie Fisher with Hugo Winterhalter's Orchestra and Chorus	"Rags to Riches"; Tony Bennett with Percy Faith and his Orchestra	"Oh, Mein Papa (Oh, My Papa)"	
January 23	"Oh! My Pa-Pa (O Mein Papa)"; Eddie Fisher with Hugo Winterhalter's Orchestra and Chorus	"Oh! My Pa-Pa (O Mein Papa)"; Eddie Fisher with Hugo Winterhalter's Orchestra and Chorus	"Rags to Riches"; Tony Bennett with Percy Faith and his Orchestra	"Oh, Mein Papa (Oh, My Papa)"	
January 30	"Oh! My Pa-Pa (O Mein Papa)"; Eddie Fisher with Hugo Winterhalter's Orchestra and Chorus	"Oh! My Pa-Pa (O Mein Papa)"; Eddie Fisher with Hugo Winterhalter's Orchestra and Chorus	"Oh! My Pa-Pa (O Mein Papa)"; Eddie Fisher with Hugo Winterhalter's Orchestra and Chorus	"Oh, Mein Papa (Oh, My Papa)"	
February 6	"Oh! My Pa-Pa (O Mein Papa)"; Eddie Fisher with Hugo Winterhalter's Orchestra and Chorus	"Oh! My Pa-Pa (O Mein Papa)"; Eddie Fisher with Hugo Winterhalter's Orchestra and Chorus	"Oh! My Pa-Pa (O Mein Papa)"; Eddie Fisher with Hugo Winterhalter's Orchestra and Chorus	"Oh, Mein Papa (Oh, My Papa)"	
February 13	"Oh! My Pa-Pa (O Mein Papa)"; Eddie Fisher with Hugo Winterhalter's Orchestra and Chorus	"Oh! My Pa-Pa (O Mein Papa)"; Eddie Fisher with Hugo Winterhalter's Orchestra and Chorus	"Oh! My Pa-Pa (O Mein Papa)"; Eddie Fisher with Hugo Winterhalter's Orchestra and Chorus	"Oh, Mein Papa (Oh, My Papa)"	
February 20	"Oh! My Pa-Pa (O Mein Papa)"; Eddie Fisher with Hugo Winterhalter's Orchestra and Chorus	"Oh! My Pa-Pa (O Mein Papa)"; Eddie Fisher with Hugo Winterhalter's Orchestra and Chorus	"Oh! My Pa-Pa (O Mein Papa)"; Eddie Fisher with Hugo Winterhalter's Orchestra and Chorus	"Oh, Mein Papa (Oh, My Papa)"	
February 27	"Secret Love"; Doris Day with Orchestra conducted by Ray Heindorf	"Oh! My Pa-Pa (O Mein Papa)"; Eddie Fisher with Hugo Winterhalter's Orchestra and Chorus	"Oh! My Pa-Pa (O Mein Papa)"; Eddie Fisher with Hugo Winterhalter's Orchestra and Chorus	"Oh, Mein Papa (Oh, My Papa)"	
March 6	"Secret Love"; Doris Day with Orchestra conducted by Ray Heindorf	"Secret Love"; Doris Day with Orchestra conducted by Ray Heindorf	"Oh! My Pa-Pa (O Mein Papa)"; Eddie Fisher with Hugo Winterhalter's Orchestra and Chorus	"Oh, Mein Papa (Oh, My Papa)"	
March 13	"Make Love to Me!"; Jo Stafford with Paul Weston & his Orchestra	"Secret Love"; Doris Day with Orchestra conducted by Ray Heindorf	"Make Love to Me!"; Jo Stafford with Paul Weston & his Orchestra	"Secret Love"	
March 20	"Secret Love"; Doris Day with Orchestra conducted by Ray Heindorf	"Secret Love"; Doris Day with Orchestra conducted by Ray Heindorf	"Make Love to Me!"; Jo Stafford with Paul Weston & his Orchestra	"Secret Love"	
March 27	"Make Love to Me!"; Jo Stafford with Paul Weston & his Orchestra	"Secret Love"; Doris Day with Orchestra conducted by Ray Heindorf	"Make Love to Me!"; Jo Stafford with Paul Weston & his Orchestra	"Make Love to Me"	
April 3	"Make Love to Me!"; Jo Stafford with Paul Weston & his Orchestra	"Make Love to Me!"; Jo Stafford with Paul Weston & his Orchestra	"Make Love to Me!"; Jo Stafford with Paul Weston & his Orchestra	"Make Love to Me"	
April 10	"Wanted"; Perry Como with Hugo Winterhalter's Orchestra and Chorus	"Make Love to Me!"; Jo Stafford with Paul Weston & his Orchestra	"Make Love to Me!"; Jo Stafford with Paul Weston & his Orchestra	"Make Love to Me"	
April 17	"Wanted"; Perry Como with Hugo Winterhalter's Orchestra and Chorus	"Make Love to Me!"; Jo Stafford with Paul Weston & his Orchestra	"Make Love to Me!"; Jo Stafford with Paul Weston & his Orchestra	"Wanted"	
April 24	"Wanted"; Perry Como with Hugo Winterhalter's Orchestra and Chorus	"Wanted"; Perry Como with Hugo Winterhalter's Orchestra and Chorus	"Make Love to Me!"; Jo Stafford with Paul Weston & his Orchestra	"Wanted"	
May 1	"Wanted"; Perry Como with Hugo Winterhalter's Orchestra and Chorus	"Wanted"; Perry Como with Hugo Winterhalter's Orchestra and Chorus	"Wanted"; Perry Como with Hugo Winterhalter's Orchestra and Chorus	"Wanted"	
May 8	"Wanted"; Perry Como with Hugo Winterhalter's Orchestra and Chorus	"Wanted"; Perry Como with Hugo Winterhalter's Orchestra and Chorus	"Wanted"; Perry Como with Hugo Winterhalter's Orchestra and Chorus	"Wanted"	
May 15	"Wanted"; Perry Como with Hugo Winterhalter's Orchestra and Chorus	"Wanted"; Perry Como with Hugo Winterhalter's Orchestra and Chorus	"Wanted"; Perry Como with Hugo Winterhalter's Orchestra and Chorus	"Wanted"	
May 22	"Wanted"; Perry Como with Hugo Winterhalter's Orchestra and Chorus	"Wanted"; Perry Como with Hugo Winterhalter's Orchestra and Chorus	"Wanted"; Perry Como with Hugo Winterhalter's Orchestra and Chorus	"Wanted"	
May 29	"Wanted"; Perry Como with Hugo Winterhalter's Orchestra and Chorus	"Wanted"; Perry Como with Hugo Winterhalter's Orchestra and Chorus	"Wanted"; Perry Como with Hugo Winterhalter's Orchestra and Chorus	"Wanted"	
June 5	"Little Things Mean a Lot"; Kitty Kallen with Orchestra Directed by Jack Pleis	"Wanted"; Perry Como with Hugo Winterhalter's Orchestra and Chorus	"Wanted"; Perry Como with Hugo Winterhalter's Orchestra and Chorus	"Wanted"	
June 12	"Little Things Mean a Lot"; Kitty Kallen with Orchestra Directed by Jack Pleis	"Little Things Mean a Lot"; Kitty Kallen with Orchestra Directed by Jack Pleis	"Wanted"; Perry Como with Hugo Winterhalter's Orchestra and Chorus	"Little Things Mean a Lot"	
June 19	"Little Things Mean a Lot"; Kitty Kallen with Orchestra Directed by Jack Pleis	"Little Things Mean a Lot"; Kitty Kallen with Orchestra Directed by Jack Pleis	"Wanted"; Perry Como with Hugo Winterhalter's Orchestra and Chorus	"Little Things Mean a Lot"	
June 26	"Little Things Mean a Lot"; Kitty Kallen with Orchestra Directed by Jack Pleis	"Little Things Mean a Lot"; Kitty Kallen with Orchestra Directed by Jack Pleis	"Little Things Mean a Lot"; Kitty Kallen with Orchestra Directed by Jack Pleis	"Little Things Mean a Lot"	
July 3	"Little Things Mean a Lot"; Kitty Kallen with Orchestra Directed by Jack Pleis	"Little Things Mean a Lot"; Kitty Kallen with Orchestra Directed by Jack Pleis	"Little Things Mean a Lot"; Kitty Kallen with Orchestra Directed by Jack Pleis	"Little Things Mean a Lot"	
July 10	"Little Things Mean a Lot"; Kitty Kallen with Orchestra Directed by Jack Pleis	"Little Things Mean a Lot"; Kitty Kallen with Orchestra Directed by Jack Pleis	"Little Things Mean a Lot"; Kitty Kallen with Orchestra Directed by Jack Pleis	"Little Things Mean a Lot"	
July 17	"Little Things Mean a Lot"; Kitty Kallen with Orchestra Directed by Jack Pleis	"Little Things Mean a Lot"; Kitty Kallen with Orchestra Directed by Jack Pleis	"Little Things Mean a Lot"; Kitty Kallen with Orchestra Directed by Jack Pleis	"Little Things Mean a Lot"	
July 24	"Little Things Mean a Lot"; Kitty Kallen with Orchestra Directed by Jack Pleis	"Little Things Mean a Lot"; Kitty Kallen with Orchestra Directed by Jack Pleis	"Three Coins in the Fountain"; The Four Aces featuring Al Alberts with Chorus and Orchestra Directed by Jack Pleis	"Little Things Mean a Lot"	
July 31	"Little Things Mean a Lot"; Kitty Kallen with Orchestra Directed by Jack Pleis	"Little Things Mean a Lot"; Kitty Kallen with Orchestra Directed by Jack Pleis	"Little Things Mean a Lot"; Kitty Kallen with Orchestra Directed by Jack Pleis	"Little Things Mean a Lot"	
August 7	"Sh-Boom"; The Crew-Cuts with David Carroll and His Orchestra	"Sh-Boom"; The Crew-Cuts with David Carroll and His Orchestra	"Little Things Mean a Lot"; Kitty Kallen with Orchestra Directed by Jack Pleis	"Little Things Mean a Lot"	
August 14	"Sh-Boom"; The Crew-Cuts with David Carroll and His Orchestra	"Sh-Boom"; The Crew-Cuts with David Carroll and His Orchestra	"Little Things Mean a Lot"; Kitty Kallen with Orchestra Directed by Jack Pleis	"Sh-Boom"	
August 21	"Sh-Boom"; The Crew-Cuts with David Carroll and His Orchestra	"Sh-Boom"; The Crew-Cuts with David Carroll and His Orchestra	"Sh-Boom"; The Crew-Cuts with David Carroll and His Orchestra	"Sh-Boom"	
August 28	"Sh-Boom"; The Crew-Cuts with David Carroll and His Orchestra	"Sh-Boom"; The Crew-Cuts with David Carroll and His Orchestra	"Sh-Boom"; The Crew-Cuts with David Carroll and His Orchestra	"Sh-Boom"	
September 4	"Sh-Boom"; The Crew-Cuts with David Carroll and His Orchestra	"Sh-Boom"; The Crew-Cuts with David Carroll and His Orchestra	"Sh-Boom"; The Crew-Cuts with David Carroll and His Orchestra	"Sh-Boom"	
September 11	"Sh-Boom"; The Crew-Cuts with David Carroll and His Orchestra	"Sh-Boom"; The Crew-Cuts with David Carroll and His Orchestra	"Sh-Boom"; The Crew-Cuts with David Carroll and His Orchestra	"Sh-Boom"	
September 18	"Sh-Boom"; The Crew-Cuts with David Carroll and His Orchestra	"Sh-Boom"; The Crew-Cuts with David Carroll and His Orchestra	"Sh-Boom"; The Crew-Cuts with David Carroll and His Orchestra	"Sh-Boom"	
September 25	"Hey There"; Rosemary Clooney with Buddy Cole and his Orchestra	"Sh-Boom"; The Crew-Cuts with David Carroll and His Orchestra	"Sh-Boom"; The Crew-Cuts with David Carroll and His Orchestra	"Sh-Boom"	
October 2	"Hey There"; Rosemary Clooney with Buddy Cole and his Orchestra	"Sh-Boom"; The Crew-Cuts with David Carroll and His Orchestra	"Sh-Boom"; The Crew-Cuts with David Carroll and His Orchestra	"Hey, There"	
October 9	"Hey There"; Rosemary Clooney with Buddy Cole and his Orchestra	"Hey There"; Rosemary Clooney with Buddy Cole and his Orchestra	"Sh-Boom"; The Crew-Cuts with David Carroll and His Orchestra	"Hey, There"	
October 16	"Hey There"; Rosemary Clooney with Buddy Cole and his Orchestra	"Hey There"; Rosemary Clooney with Buddy Cole and his Orchestra	"Hey There"; Rosemary Clooney with Buddy Cole and his Orchestra	"Hey, There"	
October 23	"Hey There"; Rosemary Clooney with Buddy Cole and his Orchestra	"Hey There"; Rosemary Clooney with Buddy Cole and his Orchestra	"Hey There"; Rosemary Clooney with Buddy Cole and his Orchestra	"Hey, There"	
October 30	"Hey There"; Rosemary Clooney with Buddy Cole and his Orchestra	"Hey There"; Rosemary Clooney with Buddy Cole and his Orchestra	"Hey There"; Rosemary Clooney with Buddy Cole and his Orchestra	"Hey, There"	
November 6	"This Ole House"; Rosemary Clooney with Buddy Cole and his Orchestra	"Hey There"; Rosemary Clooney with Buddy Cole and his Orchestra	"Hey There"; Rosemary Clooney with Buddy Cole and his Orchestra	"Hey, There"	
November 13	"I Need You Now"; Eddie Fisher with Hugo Winterhalter and his Orchestra	"I Need You Now"; Eddie Fisher with Hugo Winterhalter and his Orchestra	"This Ole House"; Rosemary Clooney with Buddy Cole and his Orchestra	"Hey, There"	
November 20	"I Need You Now"; Eddie Fisher with Hugo Winterhalter and his Orchestra	"I Need You Now"; Eddie Fisher with Hugo Winterhalter and his Orchestra	"This Ole House"; Rosemary Clooney with Buddy Cole and his Orchestra	"I Need You Now"	
November 27	"I Need You Now"; Eddie Fisher with Hugo Winterhalter and his Orchestra	"Mr. Sandman"; The Chordettes with Orchestra Conducted by Archie Bleyer	"This Ole House"; Rosemary Clooney with Buddy Cole and his Orchestra	"I Need You Now"	
December 4	"Mr. Sandman"; The Chordettes with Orchestra Conducted by Archie Bleyer	"Mr. Sandman"; The Chordettes with Orchestra Conducted by Archie Bleyer	"I Need You Now"; Eddie Fisher with Hugo Winterhalter and his Orchestra	"Mr. Sandman"	
December 11	"Mr. Sandman"; The Chordettes with Orchestra Conducted by Archie Bleyer	"Mr. Sandman"; The Chordettes with Orchestra Conducted by Archie Bleyer	"I Need You Now"; Eddie Fisher with Hugo Winterhalter and his Orchestra	"Mr. Sandman"	
December 18	"Mr. Sandman"; The Chordettes with Orchestra Conducted by Archie Bleyer	"Mr. Sandman"; The Chordettes with Orchestra Conducted by Archie Bleyer	"Mr. Sandman"; The Chordettes with Orchestra Conducted by Archie Bleyer	"Mr. Sandman"	
December 25	"Mr. Sandman"; The Chordettes with Orchestra Conducted by Archie Bleyer	"Mr. Sandman"; The Chordettes with Orchestra Conducted by Archie Bleyer	"Mr. Sandman"; The Chordettes with Orchestra Conducted by Archie Bleyer	"Mr. Sandman"	

== See also ==
- 1954 in music
