= Till I Waltz Again with You =

Single by Teresa Brewer

from the album Till I Waltz Again with You
- B-side: "Hello Bluebird"
- Released: 1952
- Recorded: 1952
- Genre: Pop
- Length: 2:59
- Label: Coral
- Songwriter: Sid Prosen

Teresa Brewer singles chronology
"You'll Never Get Away" (1952)	"Till I Waltz Again with You" (1952)	"Dancin' with Someone (Longin' for You)" (1953)

"Till I Waltz Again with You" is a popular song written by Sid Prosen. The song became a hit for several artists in both pop and country music genres, most notably by Teresa Brewer, who had a number-one hit with it in early 1953 with her late 1952 recording.

== Teresa Brewer rendition ==
American singer Teresa Brewer recorded "Till I Waltz Again with You" on August 19, 1952. Rather than a waltz as the title suggests, it is a slow AABA shuffle. Coral Records released it as a single, which first entered the Billboard Best Seller chart on December 6, 1952. It remained on the chart for 22 weeks, including seven weeks at number one. The song also reached number one on the Cashbox pop chart for six weeks in 1953.

== Other recordings ==
- According to Whitburn, a record by Dick Todd reached number 17, a recording by Russ Morgan reached number 23, and a version recorded by The Harmonicats reached number 26 on the charts, as well. Coral successfully marketed the song to the country audience.
- A version by South Carolinian Tommy Sosebea reached No. 7 on Billboard's Most Played by Jockeys survey.
- Alma Cogan and the Kordites, with orchestra conductor Frank Cordell recorded it in London on February 10, 1952. The song was released by EMI on the His Master's Voice label as catalog number B 10449.
- The song was also recorded by Joan Regan in the United Kingdom around the same time. It sold 35,000 copies.
- In Australia in 1953, it was recorded by Bob Gibson & His Orchestra, featuring vocalist Ross Higgins, on Pacific label catalogue number PB-086, backed with Have You Heard?.
- Semprini, pianoforte with Rhythm accompaniment recorded it in London on March 11, 1953, as the third song of the medley "Dancing to the piano (No. 20) - Hit medley of foxtrots" along with "Why Don't You Believe Me" and "Downhearted". The medley was released by EMI on the His Master's Voice label as catalog number B 10457.
- On May 25, 1953 Harry James recorded a live version performed at the Astor Roof in New York City. (One Night Stand With Harry James, 1975, Joyce LP-1014)
- A 1953 cover by the singer Izumi Yukimura became a hit in Japan under the title "Omoide No Warutsu" (Japanese: 想い出のワルツ). It sold 200,000 copies.
- Jane Morgan released a single version in 1965.

== Elvis Presley performance ==
In April 1953, during his senior year in high school, Elvis Presley sang the song in his high school's "Annual Minstrel" show. Presley recalled that the performance did much for his reputation: "I wasn't popular in school ... I failed music—only thing I ever failed. And then they entered me in this talent show ... when I came onstage I heard people kind of rumbling and whispering and so forth, 'cause nobody knew I even sang. It was amazing how popular I became after that."

== See also ==
- List of number-one singles of 1953 (U.S.)
