= Stan Freberg =

American actor (1926–2015)

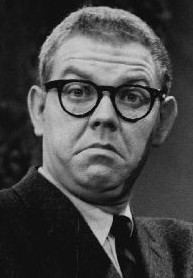
- Freberg in 1956
- Born: Stanley Friberg; August 7, 1926; Pasadena, California, U.S.
- Died: April 7, 2015 (aged 88); Santa Monica, California, U.S.
- Resting place: Westwood Village Memorial Park Cemetery
- Other names: Stanley Freberg; Stan Friberg; Stanley Victor Freberg
- Occupations: Actor; satirist; radio personality; advertising creative director
- Years active: 1943–2014
- Spouses: Donna Freberg (m. 1959; died 2000); Betty Hunter Freberg (m. 2001)
- Children: 2, including Donavan Freberg
- Awards: 21 Clio Awards; 3 Emmy Awards; Grammy Award; Inkpot Award; Winsor McCay Award
- Musical career
- Genres: Pop; jazz; satire
- Instrument: Vocals

Stan Freberg (born Stanley Friberg; August 7, 1926 – April 7, 2015) was an American actor, satirist, radio personality, and advertising director.

His best-known works include "St. George and the Dragonet", Stan Freberg Presents the United States of America, his role on the television series Time for Beany, multiple characters in the Looney Tunes series (such as Pete Puma and Bertie), and a number of classic television commercials.

== Early and personal life ==
Freberg was born Stanley Friberg on August 7, 1926, in Pasadena, California, the son of Evelyn Dorothy (née Conner), a housewife, and Victor Richard Friberg (later Freberg), a Baptist minister. Freberg was of Swedish and Irish descent.

He was drafted in the US Army from 1945 to 1947, where he served in Special Services attached to the Medical Corps at McCornack General Hospital in Pasadena, California.

Freberg's work reflected his refusal to accept alcohol and tobacco manufacturers as sponsors—an impediment to his radio career when he took over for Jack Benny on CBS radio. As Freberg explained to Rusty Pipes:

After I replaced Jack Benny in 1957, they were unable to sell me with spot announcements in the show. That would mean that every three minutes I'd have to drop a commercial in. So I said, "Forget it. I want to be sponsored by one person", like Benny was, by American Tobacco or State Farm Insurance, except that I wouldn't let them sell me to American Tobacco. I refused to let them sell me to any cigarette company.

Freberg's first wife, Donna, died in 2000. He had two children from that marriage, Donna Jean and Donavan Freberg. He married Betty Hunter in 2001.

== Animation ==
Freberg began his career doing impersonations on Cliffie Stone's radio show in 1943. Freberg was employed as a voice actor in animation shortly after graduating from Alhambra High School. He began at Warner Bros. Cartoons in 1944 by getting on a bus and asking the driver to let him off "in Hollywood". As he describes in his autobiography, It Only Hurts When I Laugh, he got off the bus and found a sign that said "talent agency". He walked in, and the agents there arranged for him to audition for Warner Bros. cartoons where he was promptly hired. Thus began Freberg's professional career in entertainment, which lasted for more than 70 years, all the way up to his death.

His first notable cartoon voice work was in a Warner Bros. cartoon called For He's a Jolly Good Fala, which was recorded but never filmed (due to the death of Fala's owner, President Franklin D. Roosevelt), followed by Roughly Squeaking (1946) as Bertie; and in 1947, he was heard in It's a Grand Old Nag (Charlie Horse), produced and directed by Bob Clampett for Republic Pictures; Goofy Gophers (Tosh), and One Meat Brawl (Grover Groundhog and Walter Winchell).

Freberg voiced the character of Junyer Bear, but the role was actually created by actor Kent Rogers in Bugs Bunny and the Three Bears (1944). After Rogers was killed during World War II, Freberg assumed the role of Junyer Bear in Chuck Jones' Looney Tunes cartoon What's Brewin', Bruin? (1948). This featured Jones' version of The Three Bears.

He often found himself paired with Mel Blanc while at Warner Bros., where the two men performed such pairs as the mice Hubie and Bertie, the Goofy Gophers Mac and Tosh, and Spike the Bulldog and Chester the Terrier. In 1952, he was the voice of Friz Freleng's "Dumb Dog" in Foxy by Proxy, who meets up with a disguised Bugs Bunny wearing a fox suit. He was the voice of Pete Puma in the 1952 cartoon Rabbit's Kin, in which he did an impression of an early Frank Fontaine characterization (which later became Fontaine's "Crazy Guggenheim" character).

Freberg's work as a voice actor for Walt Disney Productions included the role of Mr. Busy the Beaver in Lady and the Tramp (1955), and he did voice work in Susie the Little Blue Coupe and Lambert the Sheepish Lion. He received screen credit for his voice work on Three Little Bops (1957), where he voiced all the characters and sang the titular song. Freberg's interpretation of Pete Puma also provided the basis for Daws Butler's voice of Sam, the orange cat paired with Sylvester in the Academy Award-nominated short Mouse and Garden (1960). He voiced Cage E. Coyote, the father of Wile E. Coyote, in the 2000 short Little Go Beep.

== Films ==
Freberg was cast to sing the part of the Jabberwock in the song "Beware the Jabberwock" for Disney's Alice in Wonderland, with the Rhythmaires and Daws Butler. Written by Don Raye and Gene de Paul, the song was a musical rendering of the poem "Jabberwocky" from Lewis Carroll's Through the Looking-Glass. The song was not included in the final film, but a demo recording was included in the 2004 and 2010 DVD releases of the film.

Freberg made his film debut in the comedy Callaway Went Thataway (1951), a satirical spoof on the marketing of Western stars (apparently inspired by the TV success of Hopalong Cassidy). Freberg costarred with Mala Powers in Geraldine (1954) as sobbing singer Billy Weber, enabling him to reprise his satire on vocalist Johnnie Ray (see below). In 1963's It's a Mad, Mad, Mad, Mad World, Freberg appeared in a non-speaking role as the Deputy Sheriff and acted as the voice of a dispatcher.

Contrary to popular belief, George Lucas called upon Freberg, not Mel Blanc, to audition for the voice of the character C-3PO for the 1977 film Star Wars. After he and many others auditioned for the part, Freberg suggested that Lucas use mime actor Anthony Daniels' voice.

== Capitol Records ==
=== Early releases ===
Freberg was one of the talents recruited by Capitol Records when it launched its spoken-word division. He began on February 10, 1951, and produced satirical recordings about popular culture. One of his most notable releases was "John and Marsha", a soap opera parody that consisted of the title characters (both played by Freberg) doing nothing but repeating each other's names (with intonations to match the moods). Some radio stations refused to play "John & Marsha", believing it to be an actual romantic conversation between two real people. In a 1954 follow-up, he used pedal steel guitarist Speedy West to satirize the 1953 Ferlin Husky country hit, "A Dear John Letter", as "A Dear John and Marsha Letter" (Capitol 2677).

Another hit to receive the Freberg treatment was Johnnie Ray's weepy "Cry", which Freberg rendered as "Try", exaggerating Ray's histrionic vocal style. Johnnie Ray was furious until he realized the success of Freberg's 1952 parody was actually increasing sales and airplay of his own record. Freberg reported getting more angry feedback for this than from any of his other parodies.

With Daws Butler and June Foray, Freberg produced his 1953 Dragnet parody, "St. George and the Dragonet", a No. 1 hit for four weeks in October 1953. It sold over one million copies and was awarded a gold disc.

After "I've Got You Under My Skin" (1951), he followed with more popular musical satires, such as "Sh-Boom" (1954), a parody of the song recorded by The Chords. At the end, he yells "STELLA!" at a woman, imitating Marlon Brando in A Streetcar Named Desire. The B side was a parody of the Eartha Kitt record "C'est si bon", broadcast in 1955 on the TV show Sam and Friends. Other songs include "The Yellow Rose of Texas" (1955), where a "Yankee" snare drummer gets out of hand on the recording; "Rock Around Stephen Foster", a parody of recordings by Bill Haley and others in which a music arranger (Freberg) tries with mixed results to get a chorus to perform a medley of Foster's standards in rock and roll style at one point adding Foster's lyrics to Haley's arrangement of "Shake, Rattle and Roll"; "Rock Island Line", based on the 1955 Lonnie Donegan skiffle version, with interruptions by Peter Leeds; and a spoof of The Platters' hit "The Great Pretender" (1956).

He recorded a parody of Elvis Presley's first chart record, "Heartbreak Hotel". In Freberg's version, the echo effect goes out of control, and "Elvis" eventually rips his tight jeans during the performance.

With Foray, he recorded "The Quest for Bridey Hammerschlaugen", a spoof of The Search for Bridey Murphy by Morey Bernstein, a 1956 book on hypnotic regression to a past life, and an LP of the first actual hypnosis session.

=== "The Great Pretender" and "Banana Boat Song" ===
Freberg used a beatnik musician theme in his 1956 parody of "The Great Pretender", the hit by The Platters—who, like Ray (see above) and Belafonte and Welk (see both below), were not pleased. At that time, when it was still hoped that musical standards might be preserved, it was quite permissible to ridicule the ludicrous, as Freberg had obviously thought when he parodied Presley. The pianist in Freberg's parody, a devotee of Erroll Garner and George Shearing, rebels against playing a single-chord accompaniment, retorting, "I'm not playing that 'clink-clink-clink jazz'!" But Freberg is adamant about the pianist's sticking to The Platters' style: "You play that 'clink-clink-clink jazz', or you won't get paid tonight!" The pianist relents—sort of. The pianist even quotes the first six notes from Shearing's classic piece "Lullaby of Birdland", before returning to the song. The song concludes with the pianist taking a liking to the arrangement only after he gets into an uncontrollably accelerating groove, despite the histrionic singer's pleas to keep tempo; the singer has to escape the studio.

Freberg's "Banana Boat (Day-O)" (1957) satirized Harry Belafonte's popular recording of "Banana Boat Song". In Freberg's version, the lead singer is forced to run down the hall and close the door after him to muffle the sound of his "Day-O!" because the beatnik bongo drummer, voiced by Leeds, complains, "It's too shrill, man. It's too piercing!" When he gets to the lyric about "A beautiful buncha ripe banana/Hide the deadly black tarantula", the drummer protests, "I don't dig spiders!" The flip is "Tele-Vee-Shun", an anti-TV song about what television has done to his family, sung in a heavy faux-Trinidadian accent and set to a Calypso tune. Freberg first recorded the song in 1952, but the 1957 version is the most well known, which lampoons Elvis Presley in one verse: "I turn on Elvis Presley and my daughter scream. / I fear she have a nervous breakdown cos of heem. / I wonder why he wiggle-waggle to de beat. / As a boy he must have had a loose bicycle seat."

Freberg's musical parodies were a product of his collaborations with Billy May, a veteran big band musician and jazz arranger, and his Capitol Records producer, Ken Nelson.. In late 1957, as TV "champagne music" master Lawrence Welk's ABC TV show gained popularity nationwide, Freberg released "Wun'erful, Wun'erful! (Sides uh-one & uh-two)", a freewheeling mockery of the show, Welk's stilted, cornball delivery and the questionable musicianship of some of Welk's sidemen. To faithfully replicate Welk's sound, May and some of Hollywood's finest studio musicians and vocalists worked to clone Welk's live on-air style, carefully incorporating bad notes and mistimed cues. Billy Liebert, a first-rate accordionist, copied Welk's accordion playing. In the parody, the orchestra is overwhelmed by the malfunctioning bubble machine and the entire Aragon Ballroom eventually floats out to sea. When he met Freberg, Welk denied he had ever said "Wunnerful, Wunnerful!" and objected to the ending, futilely asking to have the orchestra rescued. But despite his denial of the phrase, Welk made it the title of his autobiography (Prentice Hall, 1971), and he never publicly stated his exact reasons. Among the regulars on Welk's show who were lampooned were "Champagne Lady" Alice Lon, who became "Alice Lean", Larry Hooper became "Larry Looper", trumpeter-novelty singer Rocky Rockwell became "Stony Stonedwell" and the Lennon Sisters became the "Lemon Sisters." Freberg had performed a lengthier version of the sketch on the August 11, 1957 episode of The Stan Freberg Show.

=== Political satire ===
Freberg also tackled political issues of the day. On his radio show, an extended sketch paralleled the Cold War brinkmanship between the U.S. and the Soviet Union by portraying an ever-escalating public relations battle between the El Sodom and the Rancho Gomorrah, two casinos in the city of Los Voraces (Spanish for "The Greedy Ones"—a thinly disguised Las Vegas). The sketch ends with the ultimate tourist attraction, the Hydrogen Bomb, which turns Los Voraces into a vast, barren wasteland. Network pressure forced Freberg to remove the reference to the hydrogen bomb and had the two cities being destroyed by an earthquake instead. The version of "Incident at Los Voraces", released later on Capitol Records, contains the original ending.

Freberg had poked fun at McCarthyism in passing in "Little Blue Riding Hood" with the line, "Only the color has been changed to prevent an investigation." Later, he blatantly parodied Senator Joseph McCarthy with "Point of Order" (taken from his frequent objection). The "suspect" being investigated was the black sheep from the nursery rhyme, "Baa, Baa, Black Sheep". (Butler: "I would be suspicious of anyone who tried to rhyme dame with lane.") Capitol's legal department was very nervous. Freberg describes being called in for a chat with Robert Karp, the department head, and being asked whether he had ever belonged to any group that might get attention from McCarthy. He replied, "I am, and have been for a long time, a card-carrying member of... "—the executive went pale—"... the Little Orphan Annie Fan Club of America." The executive retorted, "No, this is serious; this is not funny, Freberg. Stop making jokes!" A watered-down version of the parody was eventually aired.

=== Controversy ===
On two occasions, Capitol refused to release Freberg's records. "That's Right, Arthur" was a barbed parody of controversial 1950s radio/TV personality Arthur Godfrey, who expected his stable of performers—known as "little Godfreys"—to toady to him endlessly. The dialogue included Freberg's "Godfrey" monologue, punctuated by Butler imitating Godfrey announcer Tony Marvin, repeatedly interjecting, "That's right, Arthur!" between Godfrey's comments. Capitol feared Godfrey might take legal action and sent a copy of Freberg's record to Godfrey's legal department for permission, which was denied. Capitol also rejected the equally acerbic "Most of the Town", a spoof of Ed Sullivan's "The Toast of the Town", under similar circumstances. Both recordings were eventually issued in a box-set Freberg retrospective issued by Rhino Records.

Freberg continued to skewer the advertising industry after the demise of his show, producing and recording "Green Chri$tma$" in 1958, a scathing indictment of the over-commercialization of the holiday, in which Butler soberly hoped instead that we'd remember "Whose birthday we're celebrating". The satire ended abruptly with a rendition of "Jingle Bells" punctuated by cash register sounds. The original version was somewhat longer when it was first released in 1958, but in later years Capitol did not reissue the full recording. Freberg also revisited the "Dragnet" theme, with "Yulenet", also known as "Christmas Dragnet", in which the strait-laced detective convinces a character named "Grudge" that Santa Claus really exists (and Columbus, Cleveland, Cincinnati, and the Easter Bunny, but Grudge still hadn't made up his mind yet about Toledo). Butler does several voices on the record.

=== Oregon! Oregon! ===
In 1958, the Oregon Centennial Commission, under the sponsorship of Blitz-Weinhard Brewing Company, hired Freberg to create a musical to celebrate Oregon's one-hundredth birthday. The result was Oregon! Oregon! A Centennial Fable in Three Acts. Recorded at Capitol in Hollywood, it was released during the Oregon Centennial in 1959 as a 12″ vinyl LP album. Side one featured two versions of an introduction by Freberg (billed as "Stan Freberg, Matinee Idol"), with the second version including a few words from the president of Blitz-Weinhard Co. This was followed by the show itself, which runs for 21 minutes. Side two includes separate individual versions of each of the featured songs, including several variations on the title piece, Oregon! Oregon!

Fifty years later, as Oregon approached its Sesquicentennial, an updated version was prepared by Freberg and the Portland band Pink Martini as part of a signature series of performances throughout the state.

=== 1960s and later ===
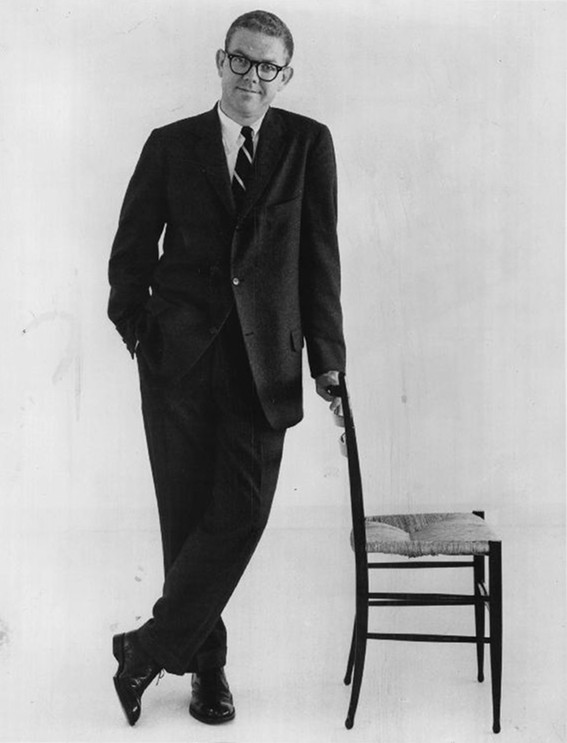
Freberg in an early 60s publicity photo

In 1960, in the light of the payola scandal, Freberg made a two-sided single titled "The Old Payola Roll Blues", which tells the story of a corrupt recording studio promoter (voiced by Jesse White) who finds "Clyde Ankle" (a play on the name of singer Paul Anka, with a storyline paralleling that of Bob Marcucci's discovery of Fabian), a teenager who cannot sing. Clyde records a song called "High School OO OO", which lasted only a few seconds. (Noting the brevity, Ankle asks, "Isn't that kind of a short song?" to which the producer answers, "Yeah, it gets more plays that way.") "I Was on My Way to High School" (complete with fake audience noise from a "scream machine") is the corresponding flip side.

The promoter then tries to bribe a disc jockey at a jazz station to play the song on the air, which he flatly refuses, suspecting that the promoter was never in the music business in the first place. Afterward, a song in the big band style heralds the end of rock and roll and a resurgence of swing and jazz. Freberg's record was on the Hot 100 only the week of Leap Day 1960, at No. 99, about three and a half months after Tommy Facenda's multi-versioned "High School U.S.A." peaked at No. 28. Alan Freed, whose career fell prey to charges of payola, reportedly laughed at Freberg's interpretation of the scandal.

Stan Freberg Presents the United States of America, Volume One: The Early Years (1961) combined dialogue and song in a musical theater format. The original album musical, released on Capitol, parodies the history of the United States from 1492 until the end of the Revolutionary War in 1783. In it, Freberg parodied both large and small aspects of history. For instance, in the Colonial era, it was common to use the long s, which resembles a lowercase f, in the middle of words; thus, as Ben Franklin is reading the Declaration of Independence, he questions the passage, "Life, liberty, and the purfuit of happineff?!?" Most of that particular sketch is a satire of McCarthyism. For example, Franklin remarks, "You...sign a harmless petition, and forget all about it. Ten years later, you get hauled up before a committee."

The album also featured the following exchange, where Freberg's Christopher Columbus is "discovered on beach here" by a Native American played by Marvin Miller. Skeptical of the Natives' diet of corn and "other organically grown vegetables", Columbus wants to open "America's first Italian restaurant" and needs to cash a check to get started:

Native: "You out of luck, today. Banks closed."
Columbus: [archly, knowing what the response will be] "Oh? Why?"
Native: "Columbus Day!"
Columbus: [pregnant pause] "We going out on that joke?"
Native: "No, we do reprise of song. That help ..."
Columbus and Native together: "But not much, no!"

In 2019, Stan Freberg Presents the United States of America, Volume One: The Early Years was selected by the Library of Congress for preservation in the National Recording Registry for being "culturally, historically, or aesthetically significant".

Stan Freberg Presents The United States of America, Volume Two was planned for release during America's Bicentennial in 1976, but did not emerge until 1996.

Freberg's early parodies revealed his obvious love of jazz. His portrayals of jazz musicians were usually stereotypical "beatnik" types, but jazz was always portrayed as preferable to pop, calypso, and particularly the then-new form of music, rock and roll. He whopped doo-wop in his version of "Sh-Boom" and lampooned Elvis Presley with an echo/reverb rendition of "Heartbreak Hotel". The United States of America includes a sketch involving the musicians in the painting The Spirit of '76. The terribly hip fife player ("Bix", played by Freberg) and the younger drummer (played by Walter Tetley) argue with the older, impossibly square drummer ("Doodle", also voiced by Freberg) over how "Yankee Doodle" should be performed.

== Radio ==
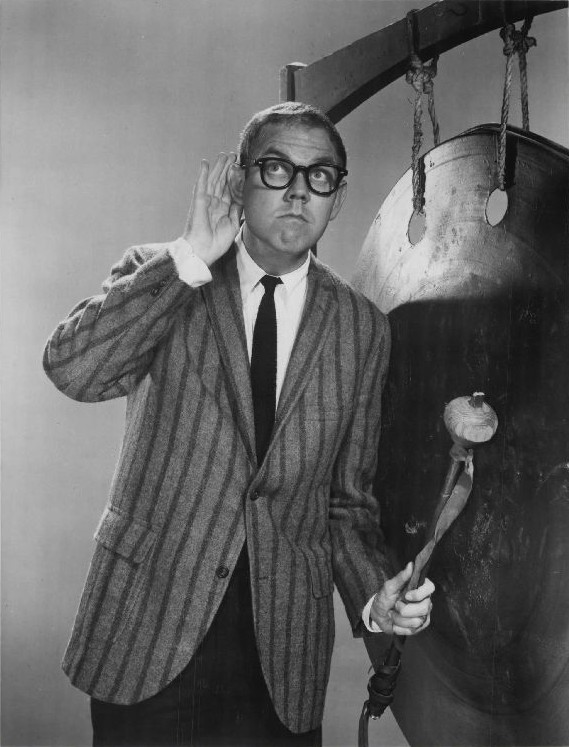
Theater for the ear: Freberg strikes a pose, 1962

The popularity of Freberg's recordings landed him his own radio program, the situation comedy That's Rich. Freberg portrayed bumbling but cynical Richard E. Wilt, a resident of Hope Springs, where he worked for B.B. Hackett's Consolidated Paper Products Company. Freberg suggested the addition of dream sequences, which made it possible for him to perform his more popular Capitol Records satires before a live studio audience. The series was broadcast over the CBS Radio Network from January 8 to September 23, 1954.

The Stan Freberg Show was a 1957 replacement for Jack Benny on CBS radio. The satirical show, produced by Pete Barnum, featured elaborate production, and included most of the team he used on his Capitol recordings, including Foray, Leeds, and Butler. Billy May arranged and conducted the music. The Jud Conlon Singers, who had also appeared on Freberg recordings, were regulars, as was singer Peggy Taylor, who later that year participated in his "Wun'erful, Wun'erful!" two-sided 45, recorded to capitalize on the response it received on the show.

The show failed to attract a sponsor after Freberg decided he did not want to be associated with the tobacco companies that had sponsored Benny. In lieu of actual commercials, Freberg mocked advertising by touting such products as "Puffed Grass" ("It's good for Bossie, it's good for me and you!"), "Food" ("Put some food in your tummy-tum-tum!"), and himself ("Stan Freberg—the foaming comedian! Bobba-bobba-bom-bom-bom"), a parody of the well-known Ajax cleanser commercial.

The lack of sponsorship was not the only problem, and Freberg also complained of radio network interference, factors which forced the cancellation of the show after a run of only 15 episodes. One sketch, "Elderly Man River", parodied the interference, as well as anticipating the political correctness movement by decades. Butler played "Mr. Tweedly", a representative of a fictional citizens' radio review board, who constantly interrupts Freberg with a loud buzzer as Freberg attempts to sing "Old Man River". Tweedly first objects to the word "old", "which some of our more elderly citizens find distasteful". As a result of Tweedly's interventions, the song's lyrics are progressively and painfully distorted, as Freberg struggles to sing the classic song in a form that Tweedly says must be acceptable "to the tiny tots" listening at home: "He don't, er, doesn't plant 'taters, er, potatoes, he doesn't plant cotton, er, cotting, and them-these-those that plants them are soon forgotting", was a lyric of which Freberg was particularly proud. Even when the censor finds Freberg's rendition acceptable, the constant interruptions ultimately bring the song to a grinding halt just before Freberg would have had to edit the line "You gets a little drunk and you lands in jail". Freberg concedes, "Take your finger off the button, Mr. Tweedly—we know when we're licked", furnishing both the moral and the punch line of the sketch.

In 1966, he recorded an album, Freberg Underground, in a format similar to his radio show, using the same cast and orchestra. He called it "pay radio", a parody of the term pay TV, the nickname at the time for subscription-based television, "... because you have to go into the record store and buy it". The album is notable for giving Dr. Edward Teller the Father of the Year award for being "father of the hydrogen bomb" ("Use it in good health!"); for lampooning all-digit dialing ("They Took Away Our Murray Hills"); and for "The Flak-man and Reagan", a combined satire of the Batman television series featuring Robin, and the 1966 California Governor's race between Edmund G. "Pat" Brown and Ronald Reagan, in which the idea of Reagan in the future running for U.S. president and winning, was used in song as a final, over-the-top gag.

With the use of sound effects in an imaginary sequence for a promotional announcement for radio, Freberg drained Lake Michigan and filled it with hot chocolate, then cued a 700-foot mountain of whipped cream to roll into it, after which the Royal Canadian Air Force towed a 10-ton maraschino cherry overhead and dropped it on top. Some 25,000 imaginary extras cheered.

Freberg returned to radio in several episodes of The Twilight Zone radio dramas in the early 2000s, including "The Brain Center at Whipple's", "Four O'Clock", "The Fugitive", "Gentlemen, Be Seated", "Kick the Can", "The Masks", and "Static".

== Television ==
Beginning in 1949, Freberg and Butler provided voices and were the puppeteers for Bob Clampett's puppet series, Time for Beany, a triple Emmy Award winner (1950, 1951, 1953). which was broadcast live on KTLA in Los Angeles, and distributed nationwide via kinescope by the Paramount Television Network, the pioneering children's TV show garnered considerable acclaim. Among its fans was Albert Einstein, who once reportedly interrupted a high-level conference by announcing, "You will have to excuse me, gentlemen. It is time for Beany."

Freberg made television guest appearances on The Ed Sullivan Show and other TV variety shows, usually with Orville the Moon Man, his puppet from outer space; he reached through the bottom of Orville's flying saucer to control the puppet's movements and turned away from the camera when he delivered Orville's lines. Freberg had his own ABC special, Stan Freberg Presents the Chun King Chow Mein Hour: Salute to the Chinese New Year (February 4, 1962), but he garnered more laughs when he was a guest on late night talk shows.

A piece from Freberg's show was used frequently on Offshore Radio in the UK in the ’60s: "You may not find us on your TV". Other on-screen television roles included The Monkees (1966) and The Girl from U.N.C.L.E. (1967). Federal Budget Review was a 1982 (copyright 1980) PBS television special lampooning the federal government. In 1996, he portrayed the continuing character of Mr. Parkin on Roseanne, and both Freberg and his son had roles in the short-lived Weird Al Show in 1997.

=== Advertising ===
Freberg founded the Los Angeles-based advertising agency Freberg Limited, which produced radio and television commercials. Two of his largest clients were General Motors and Mellon Bank. He is noted for introducing satire to the field of advertising and revolutionized the industry by influencing staid ad agencies to imitate his style into their previously dead-serious commercials. Freberg had an affinity with the radio platform, stating that it is a special medium capable of stretching the imagination more than television.

Freberg's long list of successful ad campaigns includes:

- Butter-Nut Coffee: A nine-minute musical, "Omaha!" which found success outside advertising as a musical production in the city of Omaha. It tells the story of a young man, "Eustace K. Butternut", who was stolen by Gypsies at an early age and, as an adult, returns to his own city, finding the residents under a spell that keeps them singing and raising their arms in the air. He frees them by saying his last name backwards ("Tunrettub"), but he immediately orders them to raise their hands back up again, taking everything the citizens have.
- Contadina tomato paste: "Who put eight great tomatoes in that little bitty can?"
- Jeno's pizza rolls: A parody of the Lark cigarettes commercial that used the William Tell Overture and a pickup truck with a sign in the bed saying "Show us your Lark pack", here ending with a confrontation between a cigarette smoker, portrayed by Barney Phillips (supposedly representing the Lark commercial's announcer) and Clayton Moore as the Lone Ranger over the use of the music. Jay Silverheels also appears as Tonto, filling his possibles bag with pizza rolls, after asking "Have a Pizza Roll, kemo sabe?" It was regarded as one of the most brilliantly conceived and executed TV ads of the period; after one showing on The Tonight Show, Johnny Carson remarked that it was the first commercial he had ever seen to receive spontaneous applause from the studio audience.
- Jeno's pizza, in a parody of Scope mouthwash commercials. "You know why nobody likes your parties, Mary? You have bad pizza—bad pizza!"
- Sunsweet pitted prunes: Depicted as the "food of the future" in a futuristic setting, until science fiction icon Ray Bradbury, a friend of Freberg's (shown on a wall-to-wall television screen reminiscent of Fahrenheit 451) butts in: "I never mentioned prunes in any of my stories." "You didn't?" "No, never. I'm sorry to be so candid." "No, they're not candied" (rim shot). Bradbury reportedly refused to consider doing a commercial until Freberg told him, "I'm calling it Brave New Prune", prompting Bradbury to ask, "When do we start?" Prune sales increased 400 percent the year following the campaign.
- Another Sunsweet commercial features Ronald Long as a picky eater: "They're still rather badly wrinkled, you know", and ends with the famous line, "Today, the pits; tomorrow, the wrinkles. Sunsweet marches on!"
- Heinz Great American Soups: Ann Miller is a housewife who turns her kitchen into a gigantic production number, singing such lyrics as "Let's face the chicken gumbo and dance!" After watching his wife's flashy tap dancing, her husband, played by veteran character actor Dave Willock, asks, "Why do you always have to make such a big production out of everything?" At the time (1970), this was the most expensive commercial ever made.
- Jacobsen Mowers: Sheep slowly munch on a front lawn. On camera reporter/announcer (voice of William Woodson): "Jacobsen mowers. Faster... than sheep!"
- Encyclopædia Britannica: A sardonic, bespectacled high schooler (played by Freberg's son Donavan) announces he has a major paper due soon. Freberg as the offscreen narrator advises him (and the audience) to try the encyclopedia, while the student chides him for being too pushy ("they can see the number on the bottom of the screen").
- Chun King Chinese Food: Magazine ad, featuring a lineup of nine Chinese men and one white man, all with stethoscopes around their necks and dressed in white doctors' tunics, with the caption, "Nine out of ten doctors recommend Chun King Chow Mein!"
- Kaiser Aluminum produced foil to rival Reynolds Wrap. Freberg created a sales campaign based on Kaiser's difficulties in getting grocers to stock their product, featuring the "Kaiser Foil Salesman". Despite the company's initial hesitation, the campaign produced a huge increase in distribution and sales.
- Prince Spaghetti: In 1985, Freberg produced a commercial announcing "Prince in Concert!" But it turned out to be Prince Spaghetti Sauce "in concert with" Prince Spaghetti. The rock star was not amused and sent a letter demanding they cease airing the commercial. Company President Joseph Pellegrino wrote back saying, in effect, they had the name first. The singer quietly let it go. Freberg told Time that though he'd never been sued, this was the first time he'd received an angry letter.

Freberg was also very popular in Australia, visiting there several times in the 1950s as a performer in a number of "Big Show" concerts. In 1959 he wrote and voiced an animated TV commercial in Sydney for Sunshine Powdered Milk, which won a TV "Logie" as one of the most popular TV commercials of the year in an annual awards ceremony.

Today, these advertisements are considered classics by many critics. Though Bob & Ray had pioneered intentionally comic advertisements (stemming from a hugely successful campaign for Piels beer), Stan Freberg is usually credited as being the first person to introduce humor into television advertising with memorable campaigns. He felt a truly funny commercial would cause consumers to request a product, as was the case with his elaborate ad campaign that prompted stores to stock Salada tea. Jeno Paulucci, then the owner of Chun King, had to pay off a bet over the success of Freberg's first commercial by pulling Freberg in a rickshaw on Hollywood's La Cienega Boulevard. Freberg won 21 Clio awards for his commercials. Many of those spots were included in the Freberg four-CD box set Tip of the Freberg.

== Later work ==
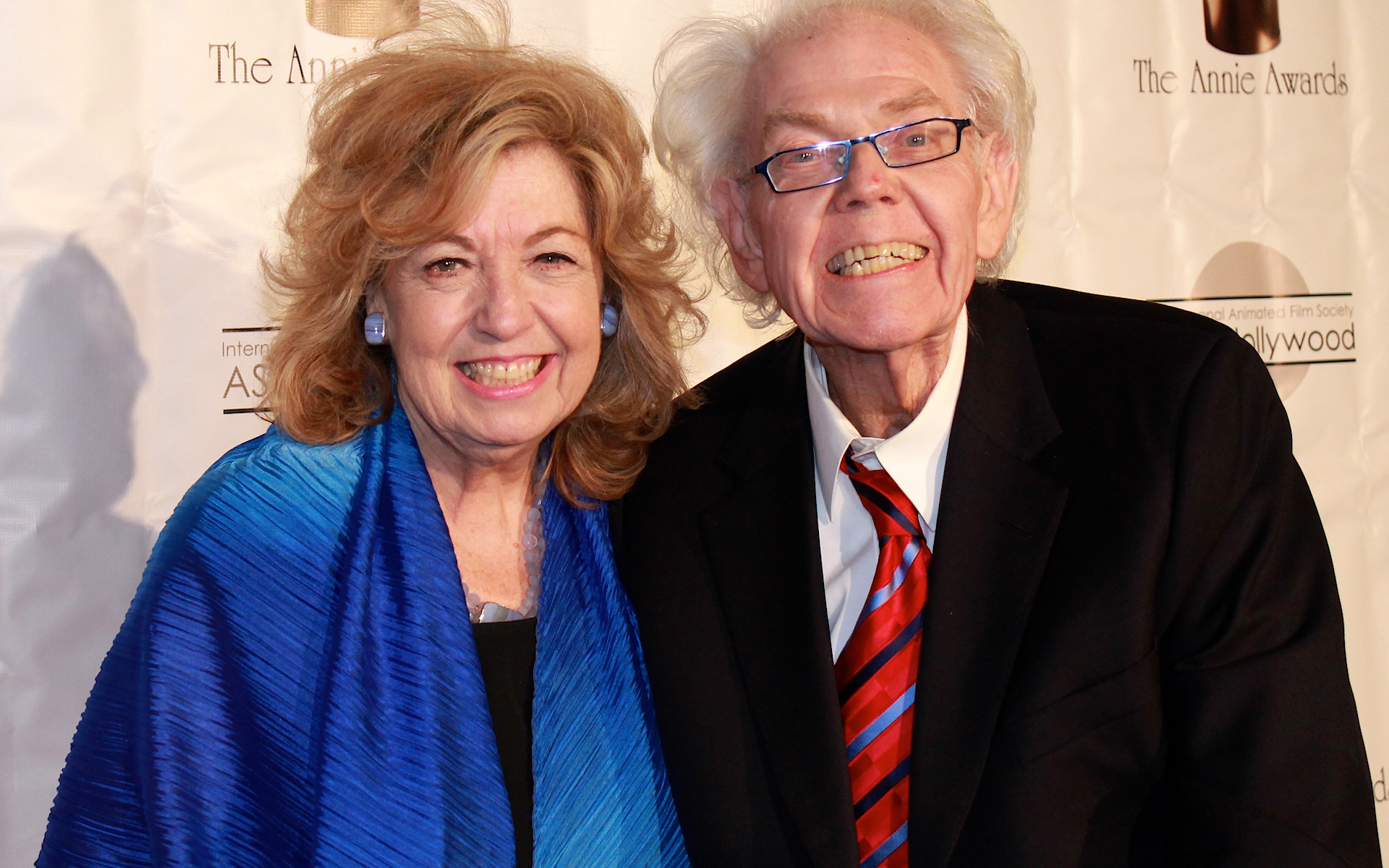
Freberg with his second wife at the Annual Annie Awards, 2014

Following his success in comedy records and television, Freberg was often invited to appear as a featured guest at various events, such as his skit at the 1978 Science Fiction Film Awards, again playing straight man to Orville in his UFO. He innocently asks why there is a hole in the end of the spacecraft, only to be told, "That's where the swamp gas comes out."

In his autobiography, It Only Hurts When I Laugh, Freberg recounts much of his life and early career, including his encounters with such show business legends as Milton Berle, Frank Sinatra and Ed Sullivan, and the struggles he endured to get his material on the air.

He had brief sketches on KNX (AM) radio in the mid-1990s, beginning each with "Freberg here!" In one sketch, Freberg mentioned that the band played "Inhale to the Chief" at Bill Clinton's inauguration.

He guest starred multiple times on The Garfield Show where he provided the voice of Dr. Whipple, and as the studio chairman on an episode of Taz-Mania.

Freberg was inducted into the National Radio Hall of Fame in 1995. From 1995 until October 6, 2006, Freberg hosted When Radio Was, a syndicated anthology of vintage radio shows. The release of the 1996 Rhino CD The United States of America Volume 1 (the Early Years) and Volume 2 (the Middle Years) suggested a possible third volume (which never happened). This set includes some parts written but cut because they would not fit on a record album.

He appeared on "Weird Al" Yankovic's The Weird Al Show, playing both the J.B. Toppersmith character and the voice of the puppet Papa Boolie. Yankovic has acknowledged Freberg as one of his greatest influences. Freberg is among the commentators in the special features on the multiple-volume DVD sets of the Looney Tunes Golden Collection and narrates the documentary "Irreverent Imagination" on Volume 1.

Freberg was the announcer for the boat race in the film adaptation of Stuart Little, and in 2008 he guest starred as Sherlock Holmes in two episodes of The Radio Adventures of Dr. Floyd. From 2008 onwards, Freberg voiced numerous characters, including Doctor Whipple and Fluffykins, on The Garfield Show. He recorded his last voice-over role as the Mole for the episode "Rodent Rebellion" in 2014.

== Death ==
Freberg died on April 7, 2015, aged 88, at UCLA Medical Center, Santa Monica in Santa Monica, California from pneumonia.

== In popular culture ==
Films

- In 1961's The Parent Trap, the characters during the animated opening title sequence refer to each other as John and Marsha.
- The 1968 film The Acid Eaters has a John and Marsha exchange. Marsha is played by Dianne Curtis.

Television

- On the fourth season premiere of the TV series Mad Men, Peggy Olson (Elisabeth Moss) and Joey Baird (Matt Long) act out the "John and Marsha" comedy soap opera parody and repeatedly call each other John and Marsha.
- Warner Brothers cartoons (in which Freberg appeared, uncredited, as a voice artist) often had cameo appearances by couples named John and Marsha. In one case, the woman was an alien, making the couple John and Martian.
- Benny Hill did a video version of Freberg's "John and Marsha" on his November 24, 1971 special, in the form of an art film parody titled "The Lovers", with Benny as John, Jenny Lee-Wright as Marsha, and Henry McGee as a third character, George; the distinguishing visual factor being that the actors were photographed from the neck down.
- "John and Marsha" also is parodied in the Rocko's Modern Life episode "Yarnbenders".

== Selected filmography ==
=== Film ===
Year	Title	Role	Notes
1951	Callaway Went Thataway	Marvin	
1953	Geraldine	Billy Weber	
1955	Lady and the Tramp	Beaver (voice)	
1958	Tom Thumb	Yawning Man (voice)	
1963	It's a Mad, Mad, Mad, Mad World	Deputy Sheriff	
1980	I Go Pogo	Albert the Alligator (voice)	
1999	Stuart Little	Boat Race Announcer (voice)	
2000	Tweety's High-Flying Adventure	Pete Puma (voice)	Direct-to-video
2003	Looney Tunes: Back in Action	Junior Bear (voice)	
2013	I Know That Voice	Himself	Documentary

=== Television ===
Year	Title	Role	Notes
1949–1953	Time for Beany	Cecil, Dishonest John (voice)	Main role (39 episodes)
1976	The First Easter Rabbit	Flops (voice)	TV Special
1990–1991	Tiny Toon Adventures	Pete Puma, Junior Bear (voice)	2 episodes
1995–1996	Freakazoid!	Mo-Ron (voice)	2 episodes
1997	The Weird Al Show	Papa Boolie (voice)	5 episodes
1998	The Sylvester & Tweety Mysteries	Pete Puma (voice)	Episode: "Good Bird Hunting"
2003	Duck Dodgers	Gopher King (voice)	Episode: "K-9 Kaddy"
2009-2016	The Garfield Show	Fluffykins/Agent X, Dr. Whipple, Shrimpy, Mice, King of Wales, Leonardo da Vinci ("History of Cats"), Bernard Scamberry, Giuseppe Squisito, Weatherman, Hubert Bob, Movie actor, Dr. GoodieGood, Mole, Garfield's boss, Spencer Spendington, Glemm, Additional voices (voice)	Final role

== Discography ==
=== Singles ===
Year	Titles (A-side, B-side) Both sides from same album except where indicated	Chart positions		Album
Year	Titles (A-side, B-side) Both sides from same album except where indicated	US	UK	Album
1951	John and Marsha b/w "Ragtime Dan" (Non-album track)	21	–	A Child's Garden Of Freberg
1951	"I've Got You Under My Skin" /	11	–	Non-album track
1951	"That's My Boy"	30	–	A Child's Garden Of Freberg
1952	"Maggie" b/w "Tele Vee Shun" (from Stan Freberg With The Original Cast)	–	–	Non-album track
1952	"Try" b/w "Pass The Udder Udder" (Non-album track)	15	–	A Child's Garden Of Freberg
1952	"The World Is Waiting for the Sunrise" b/w "The Boogie Woogie Banjo Man From Birmingham"	24	–	Non-album tracks
1953	"Dinky Pinky" – Part 1 b/w Part 2	–	–	Non-album tracks
1953	"St. George and the Dragonet" /	1	–	A Child's Garden Of Freberg
1953	"Little Blue Riding Hood"	9	–	Stan Freberg With The Original Cast
1953	"Christmas Dragnet" – Parts 1 & 2	13	–	Non-album tracks
1954	"C'est Si Bon" b/w "A Dear John and Marsha Letter" (Non-album track)	13	–	A Child's Garden Of Freberg
1954	"Person to Pearson" b/w "Point Of Order"	–	–	Non-album tracks
1954	"Sh-Boom" b/w "Widescreen Mama Blues"	14	15	A Child's Garden Of Freberg
1954	"Yulenet" – Part 1 b/w Part 2	–	–	Non-album tracks
1955	"The Honeyearthers" b/w "The Lone Psychiatrist"	–	–	Non-album tracks
1955	"The Yellow Rose of Texas" b/w "Rock Around Stephen Foster"	16	–	A Child's Garden Of Freberg
1955	"Nuttin' For Christmas" b/w "The Night Before Christmas"	53	–	Non-album tracks
1956	"The Great Pretender" b/w "The Quest For Bridey Hammerschlaugen" (from The Best Of Stan Freberg)	–	–	A Child's Garden Of Freberg
1956	"Heartbreak Hotel" /	79	–	A Child's Garden Of Freberg
1956	"Rock Island Line"	–	24	A Child's Garden Of Freberg
1957	"Banana Boat (Day-O)" b/w "Tele-Vee-Shun"	25	–	Stan Freberg With The Original Cast
1957	"Wun'erful, Wun'erful" (Side uh-one and side uh-two)	32	–	Stan Freberg With The Original Cast
1958	"Gary, Indiana" b/w "Ya Got Trouble" (from Stan Freberg With The Original Cast)	–	–	Non-album track
1958	"Green Chri$tma$" b/w "The Meaning Of Christmas" (Non-album track)	44	–	Stan Freberg With The Original Cast
1959	"The Old Payola Roll Blues" (Like The Beginning and End)	99	40	Non-album tracks
1960	"Comments For Our Time" – Part 1 b/w Part 2	–	–	Non-album tracks
1961	"Pilgrim's Progress" b/w "Yankee Doodle Go Home"	–	–	Stan Freberg Presents The United States Of America Vol. 1: The Early Years
1966	"The Flackman and Reagan" – Part 1 b/w Part 2	–	–	Freberg Underground! Show No. 1
"-" denotes release did not chart.

== Bibliography ==
- Freberg, Stan (1988). It Only Hurts When I Laugh. Times Books. ISBN 0812912977.
