= St. George and the Dragonet =

Sheet music for "St. George and the Dragonet"

"St. George and the Dragonet" is a short audio satire recorded August 26, 1953 by Stan Freberg for Capitol Records. It was released September 21, 1953 as a 45 rpm single (Capitol F2596), and reached No. 1 on both the Billboard and Cash Box record charts.

Scripted by Freberg and Daws Butler, the spoof combined the tale of "St. George and the Dragon" with the popular 1950s radio-TV series Dragnet. The recording was a #1 hit, selling over one million copies in the first three weeks. The cast featured Freberg, Butler, June Foray and Hy Averback. Freberg used a variation of the line "Just the facts, ma'am," which was popularly associated with Dragnet despite never being used in the series. Freberg actually said, "I just want to get the facts, ma’am."

== Plot ==
The narrator in the introduction states that the legend that the listener is going to hear is true and that "only the needle should be changed to protect the record." St. George begins his story: "This is the countryside. My name is St. George. I am a Knight." (This parodies Sgt. Joe Friday's opening narration, "This is the City.") St. George learns that the dragon is wanted for "devouring maidens out of season", and sets out to apprehend it. He encounters a maiden (June Foray in a New York accent) who was "burned" by the dragon and confident in her own testimony, stating that she got it "straight from the dragon's mouth." He also meets a knave (Daws Butler) who has been accused of "stealing tarts", who gives the description of the dragon. When the Knave asks St. George how he plans to capture the dragon, the knight says he will use a "dragon net". George finds the dragon and charges him with a 502 (Devouring Maidens Out of Season) and as the dragon over-dramatically bellows his defiance to the charge, St. George also charges him with a 412 (Overacting) and takes him into custody. The dragon's fire is "put out", its "maiden-devouring license" is revoked, and it is sentenced to a prison term. The narrator concludes by saying, "Maiden devouring out of season is punishable by a term of not less than 50, or more than 300 years."

== Production ==
Freberg wanted to use the original Dragnet opening theme music by Walter Schumann. Capitol Records insisted he get the permission of Dragnet star and creator, Jack Webb. Being a Freberg fan, Webb liked the idea, approved the use of the theme and allowed Freberg to use the same orchestra from the Dragnet series with Schumann conducting. (According to Freberg, when he approached Webb with the idea for the record, the actor said, "I was wondering when you'd get around to me, Freberg.")

The recording had to be restarted several times because the trombone players were laughing so hard at the jokes that they were unable to play their instruments. Schumann's music was issued on sheet music with a front cover photograph of Freberg (minus his glasses), a humorous close-up with noir lighting as if it were a still from Dragnet.

== Reception ==
"St. George and the Dragonet" was issued through the same channels as the distribution of popular music, and in 1953 it was #1 on both the Billboard and Cash Box record charts. The B-side was another Dragnet spoof, "Little Blue Riding Hood", based on the fairy tale "Little Red Riding Hood", in which Little Red Riding Hood (voiced by June Foray) is accused of trafficking "goodies". The introductory narration claims that "only the color has been changed, to prevent an investigation," a reference to the high-level "red scare" investigations conducted in that period by the House Un-American Activities Committee. Freberg's in-character narration begins, "This is the woods".

Freberg and Butler later issued a Christmas-themed Dragnet parody, "Christmas Dragnet" (aka "Yulenet"), concerning a character named Grudge who was picked up by the squad for refusing to believe in Santa Claus. Freberg's in-character narration begins,"This is the season".

"St. George and the Dragonet" was later made available in a 1991 CD set, Dr. Demento 20th Anniversary Collection (Rhino R2 70743, May 21, 1991); a 1998 CD The Very Best Of Stan Freberg (Collectables COL-CD-2733; reissue of 1990 CD The Capitol Collector's Series); and a 1999 CD set Tip of the Freberg: The Stan Freberg Collection 1951-1998 (Rhino R2 75645, August 3, 1999). In 1957 Freberg reprised the sketch on one episode of his radio series, The Stan Freberg Show.
