= The Best of Abbey Road =

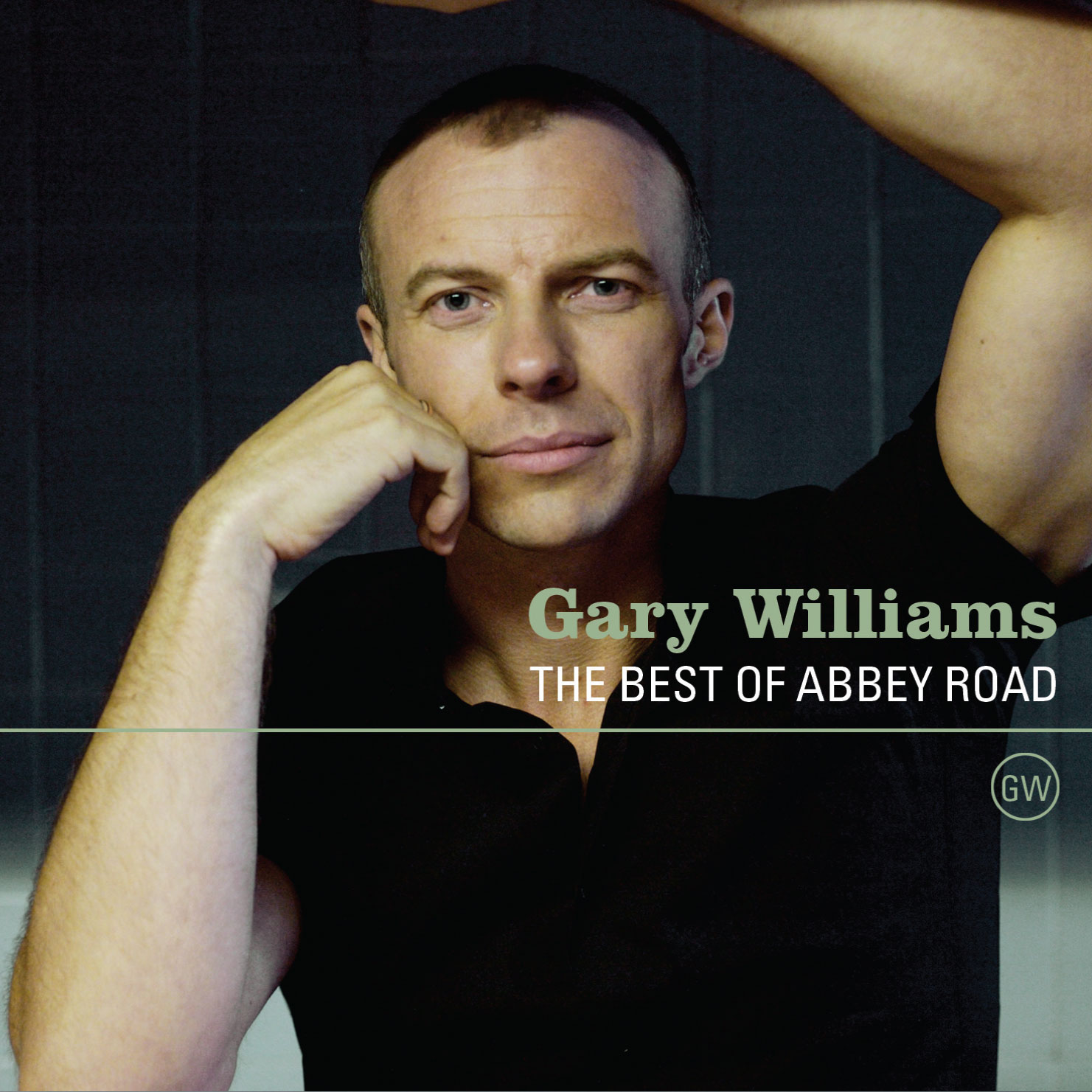

Compilation album by Gary Williams
- Released: February 13, 2010
- Recorded: Abbey Road Studios
- Genre: jazz, ballad, swing, musical
- Label: BOS Records

Gary Williams chronology
Gary Williams Meets Frank Sinatra (2010)	The Best of Abbey Road (2010)	Let There Be Love (2012)

The Best of Abbey Road is jazz vocalist Gary Williams's fifth album, released in 2010. It is a compilation album of songs from three albums recorded at Abbey Road Studios: Alone Together, In the Lounge with Gary Williams and Swingin' on Broadway.

== Critical reception ==
The album was received well by critics and reviewers.

Clive Fuller of In Tune commented: "Gary can have the lightest of touches with a song as well as a more robust approach when it is needed. The arrangements bring out the best from the song the musicians and the singer... Who could ever forget Vincent Youman's “More Than You Know” or Cole Porter’s “You’re Sensational”; Rodgers & Hammerstein’s “Surrey with the Fringe on Top”; the Gershwin’s “Isn’t it a Pity” and these are only 4 reasons why you should buy this album."

Albert Killman of Journey into Melody said: "How often have we remarked "they don't make records like that anymore." Well, they still do and here's the glowing proof. There are many so-called "tribute" singers who just seem to go through the motions. Gary, however, shows how it could be and should be done, but then it's Gary who has the talent, and boy, does it show."

== Track listing ==
No.	Title	Length
1.	"I Remember You" (from Alone Together, 2004)	3:34
2.	"Music to Watch Girls By" (from In the Lounge with Gary Williams, 2006)	3:07
3.	"Anything Goes" (from Swingin' on Broadway, 2008)	2:31
4.	"You're Never Fully Dressed Without a Smile" (from Swingin' on Broadway, 2008)	2:40
5.	"Why Shouldn't I?" (from Swingin' on Broadway, 2008)	3:31
6.	"Life Is Just A Bowl of Cherries" (from In the Lounge with Gary Williams, 2006)	2:32
7.	"Always Look on the Bright Side of Life" (from Swingin' on Broadway, 2008)	3:18
8.	"Sweet Lorraine" (from In the Lounge with Gary Williams, 2006)	2:47
9.	"I Thought About You" (from In the Lounge with Gary Williams, 2006)	2:48
10.	"This Can't Be Love" (from Swingin' on Broadway, 2008)	2:34
11.	"Surrey with a Fringe On Top" (from Swingin' on Broadway, 2008)	4:39
12.	"I Can't Give You Anything But Love" (from In the Lounge with Gary Williams, 2006)	2:27
13.	"More Than You Know" (from Alone Together, 2004)	4:15
14.	"All I Need Is The Girl" (from Swingin' on Broadway, 2008)	2:08
15.	"My Buddy" (from Alone Together, 2004)	3:43
16.	"You're Sensational" (from Alone Together, 2004)	3:12
17.	"Isn't It A Pity" (from Swingin' on Broadway, 2008)	4:44
18.	"Save The Last Dance For Me" (from Swingin' on Broadway, 2008)	2:46
Total length:		57:16
