= At the Movies =

At the Movies may refer to:

== Television ==
- At the Movies (1982 TV program), an American program, originally known as At the Movies with Gene Siskel and Roger Ebert
  - At the Movies (1986 TV program), a successor/competitor program (1986–2010) to the original, initially known as Siskel & Ebert & the Movies and renamed to At the Movies in 2007
  - Ebert Presents: At the Movies, a successor program (2011)
- At the Movies (Australian TV program), an Australian program (2004–2014) with a similar format to the American program
- "At the Movies", an episode segment of Rugrats
- "At the Movies", an episode of Beavis and Butt-head

== Music ==
- At the Movies (Creedence Clearwater Revival album), 1985
- At the Movies (Mint 400 Records album), 2018; see The Brixton Riot § Mint 400 Records
- At the Movies (Stanley Clarke album), 1995
- At the Movies (Richard & Adam album), 2014
- At the Movies (Gary Williams album), 2017
- At the Movies, an album by Sting
- At the Movies (Dave Koz album), 2007
- "At the Movies", a song by Bad Brains from Rock for Light
- Van Morrison at the Movies – Soundtrack Hits, a compilation album by Van Morrison

== See also ==
- "At the Movies", a storyline in the science fiction comedy webtoon series Live with Yourself!
