= Let There Be Love =

Let There Be Love may refer to:

== Songs ==
- "Let There Be Love" (1940 song), a song by composer Lionel Rand and lyricist Ian Grant
- "Let There Be Love" (Bee Gees song)
- "Let There Be Love" (Christina Aguilera song)
- "Let There Be Love", a 1979 song by Luv' from True Luv'
- "Let There Be Love" (Melanie C song)
- "Let There Be Love" (Oasis song)
- "Let There Be Love" (Simple Minds song)

== Albums ==
- Let There Be Love (John Pizzarelli album)
- Let There Be Love (1953 Joni James album)
- Let There Be Love (1993 Joni James album)
- Let There Be Love (Gary Williams album)
- Let There Be Love, a 2005 album by Engelbert Humperdinck
- Let There Be Love, a 2007 album by Joe Dolan

== Other uses ==
- Let There Be Love (TV series), a British sitcom from the early 1980s
- Let There Be Love (play), a 2008 play by Kwame Kwei-Armah
