= Dutton Vocalion =

British record company

Dutton Vocalion specialises in re-issuing on CD music recorded between the 1920s and 1970s, and in issuing albums of modern digital recordings. It was established by British recording and re-mastering engineer Michael J. Dutton.

== Dutton Laboratories and Dutton Epoch ==
The company is divided into two sections. The Dutton Laboratories label came first in 1993. It initially gained recognition for its highly acclaimed series of CDs of historic classical music performances that originally appeared on 78-rpm shellac discs. The Dutton Epoch series was established in 1999 and champions the unrecorded music of twentieth century British classical composers such as Arnold Bax, York Bowen, Arthur Butterworth, William Hurlstone and Granville Bantock in modern digital recordings.

== Vocalion ==
Vocalion was established in 1997 and is for CDs of light music, big bands/dance bands, jazz, easy listening, vocalists and 1950s/60s pop. Vocalion first made its name with a celebrated and ongoing series of CDs featuring the recordings of famous 1930s and 40s British dance bands, including those led by Ambrose, Geraldo, Oscar Rabin and Maurice Winnick.

Vocalion later expanded into re-issuing music from the vinyl LP golden era of the 1950s to the late 1970s. The '2 LPs on 1 CD' CDLK series was launched in 2000, alongside later Vocalion series such as CDLF and CDSML, and feature recordings of a diverse array of artistes. These range from orchestra leaders such as Robert Farnon, Mantovani and Stanley Black to singers including Lita Roza and Anthony Newley, and from 1950s/60s rock 'n' roll stars Lord Rockingham and Terry Dene right through to modern British jazz musicians and composers like Michael Garrick, John Surman and Alan Skidmore. Vocalion have also started issuing surround sound recordings on hybrid SACD.

== CDSA series ==
The CDSA series, home to Vocalion's critically acclaimed modern digital recordings, was started in 2000. The artistes are among the UK's brightest talents in the fields of orchestral light music and jazz. They include John Wilson and His Orchestra, singers Gary Williams and Lance Ellington, the big band of drummer Pete Cater, and the Best of British Jazz, which includes in its ranks the late trombonist Don Lusher.
