= Is It Any Wonder? (disambiguation) =

"Is It Any Wonder?" is a 2006 song by British band Keane.

Is It Any Wonder? may also refer to:

- "Is It Any Wonder?" (Joni James song), a 1953 song by Joni James
- Is It Any Wonder? (film), a 1975 film
- "Is It Any Wonder", a song by The Chameleons from the EP Tony Fletcher Walked on Water.... La La La La La-La La-La-La
- "Is It Any Wonder?", by The Cockroaches from their 1987 debut album: The Cockroaches
- "Is It Any Wonder", a song by The Turtles from the album Wooden Head
- "Is It Any Wonder", a song by Sophie Ellis-Bextor from the album Read My Lips
- Is It Any Wonder? (EP), an EP by David Bowie released in 2020
