= Gary Williams Meets Frank Sinatra =

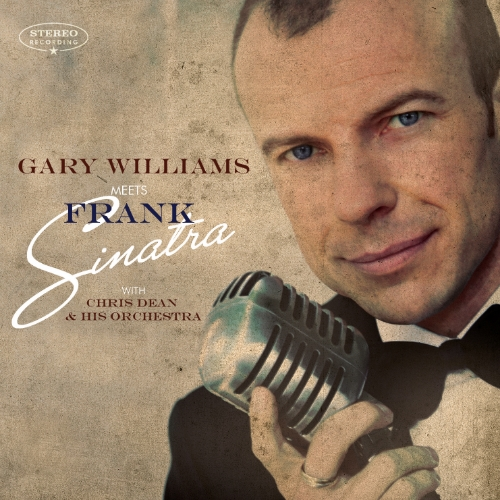

Studio album by Gary Williams
- Released: February 13, 2010
- Recorded: Abbey Road Studios
- Genre: tribute album
- Length: 53:28
- Label: BOS Records

Gary Williams chronology
Swingin' on Broadway (2008)	Gary Williams Meets Frank Sinatra (2010)	The Best of Abbey Road (2010)

Gary Williams Meets Frank Sinatra is jazz vocalist Gary Williams's fourth album, recorded with Chris Dean and his Orchestra, and released in 2010 in Europe and 2011 in Japan. It is a Frank Sinatra tribute album.

== Critical reception ==
The album was praised by critics and reviewers.

Roy Oakshot of Radio 2 commented: "These CDs are superb… I can’t recall a vocal production of this quality coming out of a British studio since the days of Matt Monro’s best work. Not only Gary's voice, which is just so on song now, but the orchestrations and the performances of Chris Dean and co – and the wonderful audio engineering – all come together to make a breath-taking listening experience."

Clive Fuller of In Tune said: "Gary is not a Sinatra impersonator he is a song stylist in his own right. A vocalist that can be as comfortable singing up tempo songs, rhythmic numbers, as well as performing slow ballads making him a much sought after talent... This CD goes straight onto my Top 10 of 2010 list!"

== Track listing ==
No.	Title	Length
1.	"All or Nothing at All"	4:05
2.	"I Get a Kick Out of You"	3:57
3.	"Moonlight Serenade"	3:27
4.	"You Brought a New Kind of Love to Me"	2:29
5.	"Dancing in the Dark"	2:14
6.	"Where or When"	2:18
7.	"Brazil"	2:47
8.	"The Girl from Ipanema"	3:25
9.	"Please Be Kind"	2:34
10.	"Day In, Day Out"	2:52
11.	"How About You?"	2:36
12.	"Nancy"	3:47
13.	"I've Got You Under My Skin"	3:37
14.	"The Way You Look Tonight"	3:00
15.	"They All Laughed"	2:46
16.	"Luck Be a Lady"	4:55
17.	"Let's Face the Music and Dance"	2:39
Total length:		53:28
