= John Wilson Orchestra =

British film and musical orchestra

The John Wilson Orchestra was formed by the British conductor John Wilson in 1994. It performs the original arrangements of MGM musicals and the works of Rodgers and Hammerstein. The orchestra performed annually in The Proms summer festival between 2009 and 2019.

== Focus and configuration ==
The John Wilson Orchestra has been acclaimed for showing how "authentic period performance" extends to screen musicals.

In an interview with Rebecca Franks for the BBC Music Magazine prior to the 2010 Proms season, John Wilson explained how the specific make-up of the orchestra reflects this purpose:

The orchestra’s been together a good 15 years and its make-up is very specific. It’s modelled on the old contract movie orchestras in America. And that's basically the combination of a dance-band brass, rhythm and saxophone section, so four trumpets, four trombones, five saxes who all double, and a rhythm section, who are all very specific specialists in this style. And then on top of that you have a woodwind and French horn section.

But I think the key thing is getting the right string players. It has to be a very high octane, high gloss, soloist sort of player. The string sound isn’t blended down, it’s blended up. You play up to the best. It’s a very in-your-face, expensive sort of string sound and it takes a lot of playing. You have to have the best players, but we're spoilt in this country for terrific orchestral performers.

== Proms concerts ==
The BBC Proms are a celebrated annual summer concert series that take place primarily at London's Royal Albert Hall. Between 2009 and 2019, The John Wilson Orchestra performed thirteen Proms at the Royal Albert Hall:

=== West Side Story (Prom 39, 2018) ===
The John Wilson Orchestra performed this musical by Leonard Bernstein (1918–1990) in 2018, his centenary year.

=== Oklahoma! (Proms 34 and 35, 2017) ===
Directed by Rachel Kavanaugh and with choreography by Alastair David, this semi-staged production of Rodgers and Hammerstein's musical marked 10 years since John Wilson first performed at the BBC Proms and eight years since the John Wilson Orchestra made their Proms debut. The "stellar cast" included Belinda Lang (Aunt Eller) with Nathaniel Hackmann (Curly), Scarlet Strallen (Laurey), Robert Fairchild (Will Parker), David Seadon-Young (Jud), and Lizzy Connolly (Ado Annie), with comedian/actor Marcus Brigstocke (Ali Hakim).

=== The John Wilson Orchestra performs Gershwin (Prom 38, 2016) ===
A tribute to George and Ira Gershwin. For 12 of the pieces in the programme, the musical scores no longer existed and John Wilson and his team reconstructed the music from sound-track recordings. The John Wilson Orchestra was joined by soloists Louise Dearman, Matthew Ford, Julian Ovenden, and the Maida Vale Singers.

=== The John Wilson Orchestra performs Sinatra (Prom 30, 2015) ===
A tribute to Frank Sinatra. Seth MacFarlane was the lead singer, with Jamie Parker and Claire Martin.

=== Bernstein – Stage and Screen (Prom 67, 2015) ===
The second of their two performances in 2015 was dedicated to the music of conductor, pianist and composer Leonard Bernstein. The John Wilson Orchestra joined forces with soloists Julian Ovenden, Louise Dearman, Lucy Schaufer, Scarlett Strallen, and the Maida Vale Singers.

=== Kiss Me, Kate (Prom 21, 2014) ===
The John Wilson Orchestra returned to the Proms in 2014 with a semi-staged production of Cole Porter's musical Kiss Me, Kate. The cast included Ben Davis (Fred Graham / Petruchio), Alexandra Silber (Lilli Vanessi / Katherine), Tony Yazbeck (Bill Calhoun / Lucentio), Louise Dearman (Lois Lane / Bianca) and Alex Bourne (Harrison Howell).

=== Hollywood Rhapsody (Prom 59, 2013) ===
This was the John Wilson Orchestra's Prom (broadcast on radio and TV) in 2013. It focused almost exclusively on the orchestra itself (rather than vocalists) with performances by the 100+ strong orchestra of scores from The Adventures of Robin Hood, The Big Country, Ben-Hur, Casablanca, Psycho, etc., as well as "Tom and Jerry at MGM".

=== My Fair Lady (Prom 2, 2012) ===
In 2012 the BBC brought back the John Wilson Orchestra for two proms. The first was a complete reconstruction of Lerner & Loewes musical My Fair Lady. This reunited many vocalists familiar from featuring with the orchestra in previous proms. This was the first of John Wilson Orchestra's proms not to be broadcast on television though it had been recorded and aired on BBC Radio 3.

=== The Broadway Sound (Prom 59, 2012) ===
The second Prom for the John Wilson Orchestra in 2012 was devoted to Broadway's best musicals. This was a tribute not just to the composers of Broadway's golden age from the 1920s to the 60s but also to the arrangers and orchestrators who created the rich orchestral textures.

The authentic sound of Broadway was revived in the ballet sequences from Richard Rodgers' On Your Toes and Leonard Bernstein's On the Town, featuring the brass and woodwind sections. Contrast was provided by romantic songs from Frank Loesser's The Most Happy Fella, a ballad from Rodgers's Allegro and a comic routine delivered by a quartet from the Maida Vale Singers, from Jerry Bock's Fiorello. Seth MacFarlane and Anna-Jane Casey performed a medley from Guys and Dolls. Other star vocalists were Rodney Earl Clarke, Elizabeth Llewellyn, Sierra Boggess and Julian Ovenden.

=== Hooray for Hollywood (Prom 59, 2011) ===
This was another televised concert from films made between 1935 and 1969, taking the audience through the birth of movie musicals to the last of the musicals made using the old studio format. Styles ranged from romantic to brash, and moods from elegiac to inspirational.

The soloists and orchestra re-created interpretations by Fred Astaire, Ginger Rogers, Gene Kelly, Judy Garland, Julie Andrews and Doris Day. Highlights included the title songs from 42nd Street (Annalene Beechey), Strike Up the Band (Caroline O'Connor), and Top Hat (Matthew Ford). Other outstanding numbers were "A Fine Romance" and "Secret Love" (Clare Teal), "Can't Help Singing" (Sarah Fox), "Jolly Holiday" (Mary Poppins, sung by Beechey) and "Put on Your Sunday Clothes" (Stuart Matthew Price). Operatic tenor Charles Castronovo interpreted "Serenade" (The Student Prince) and the duet "One Hand, One Heart" (West Side Story) with soprano Sarah Fox. Caroline O'Connor performed "The Man That Got Away" (A Star Is Born), and led the ensemble in "There's No Business Like Show Business".

As in the previous Proms, the Maida Vale Singers backed the vocalists and performed songs such as "Sit Down, You're Rockin' the Boat".

=== A Celebration of Rodgers and Hammerstein (Prom 49, 2010) ===
This project grew out of an invitation by Proms controller Roger Wright for John Wilson to do a concert commemorating the 50th anniversary of lyricist Oscar Hammerstein's death. As the John Wilson Orchestra specialises in film music, Wilson decided to revive the original film orchestrations. The choir was the Maida Vale Singers and the international star soloists included Julian Ovenden, Sierra Boggess, Kim Criswell, Anna-Jane Casey and Rod Gilfry.

As in the MGM film musicals Prom, this concert featured John Wilson's reconstructions of the following arrangers' original film score versions: Robert Russell Bennett, Adolph Deutsch, Edward B. Powell, Gus Levene, Bernard Mayers, Pete King, Irwin Kostal and Herbert W. Spencer. In an interview for the CD Release for A Celebration of Rodgers and Hammerstein Wilson remarked that recording the music for the concert and CD was the hardest music he and the orchestra ever had to play.

=== A Celebration of Classic MGM Film Musicals (Prom 22, 2009) ===
In 2009 the John Wilson Orchestra played their debut Prom, A Celebration of MGM Film Musicals. John Wilson's restored arrangements and the performance both received critical acclaim. The soloists were Sarah Fox, Sir Thomas Allen, Kim Criswell, Curtis Stigers and Seth MacFarlane.

The BBC released a DVD of the concert. This concert was also revived for a national tour of Britain in November 2010.

The evening paid tribute to, among others:

- Composers George Gershwin, Irving Berlin, Cole Porter, Harry Warren, Jerome Kern, André Previn
- Hollywood arrangers Conrad Salinger, Johnny Green and Nelson Riddle
- Musicals High Society, Singin' in the Rain, An American in Paris, The Wizard of Oz.

Wilson would go on to appear in future Proms seasons with his new ensemble Sinfonia of London.

== 2010 British tour ==
During November, the John Wilson Orchestra reunited with soloists Sir Thomas Allen (baritone), Kim Criswell, Sarah Fox, Seth MacFarlane and Curtis Stigers for a British national tour of A Celebration of Classic MGM Musicals, visiting Manchester, Nottingham, Gateshead, Glasgow, Birmingham, and Bournemouth.

== DVD ==
- A Celebration of Classic MGM Film Musicals (the MGM evening from the 2009 Proms, released July 2010; ASIN B003QHVKRQ)

== Discography ==
- This Is The John Wilson Orchestra
- Orchestral Jazz (featuring Richard Rodney Bennett; CDSA 6800)
- Shall We Dance?: Big Band Arrangements of Geraldo (CDSA 6806)
- Soft Lights and Sweet Music: Classic Arrangements by Angela Morley (CDSA 6803)
- Moonlight Becomes You (Paul Weston arrangements; CDSA 6808)
- Film and Television Music of Angela Morley (CDSA 6807)
- Dance Date (ASIN B00082MXSC)
- Alone Together (with Gary Williams; CDSA 6809)
- That's Entertainmeint: A Celebration of the MGM Film Musical (EMI Classics, 2011)
- Rodgers & Hammerstein at the Movies (EMI Classics, 2012)
