= Let There Be Love (Gary Williams album) =

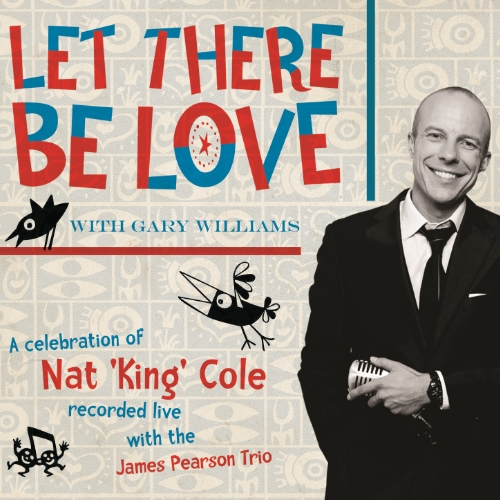

Live album by Gary Williams
- Released: 10 January 2011
- Recorded: Caxton Theatre, Grimsby
- Genre: jazz
- Length: 47:50
- Label: BOS Records

Gary Williams chronology
The Best of Abbey Road (2010)	Let There Be Love (2011)	Live in Brazil (2013)

Let There Be Love is jazz vocalist Gary Williams's sixth album, recorded at the Caxton Theatre, Grimsby, on 15 May 2004, and released in 2011. It is a Nat King Cole tribute album, recorded with the musicians James Pearson (resident pianist at Ronnie Scott's), Jeremy Brown (double bass) and Matthew Skelton (drums and percussion), and arranged by Andrew Cottee. Academy Award winner Don Black provided the sleeve notes.

Williams had previously performed Nat Cole's most famous songs with John Wilson and various concert orchestras. The creation of the recording with the trio of musicians mentioned above is described by Williams himself: "At a show in Grimsby, the sound engineer had the foresight to make an archive recording of the show, never intended for release, which I found by accident just a few months ago."

The album was released in Japan with a different cover.

== Critical reception ==
The release of the album was hailed by critics and reviewers.

Russell Davies of BBC Radio 2 commented: "As these are all live performances, the acoustic isn’t studio-sharp but pleasant and atmospheric. Gary sounds on great form – hear him especially on ‘Nature Boy’, a testing piece for any singer – and pianist James Pearson & his Trio are perfect accompanists throughout."

Clive Fuller of In Tune said: "I have always found Gary’s voice to have excellent clarity and here again he sings and phrases songs that you immediately associate with Nat King Cole but given the Gary Williams treatment. In modern day terms Gary is one of the few real song stylists never imitating or mimicking but rather giving his own interpretation of a well loved song."

David Ades of Journey into Melody commented: "Gary sings in the kind of relaxed and confident manner that can only be achieved by a performer with plenty of experience and bucketfuls of talent. Both Gary and Andrew have deservedly enjoyed considerable success in their careers since 2004, and long may they both continue to regale us with top quality popular music."

== Track listing ==
No.	Title	Length
1.	"Let's Face The Music And Dance"	1:59
2.	"It's Only A Paper Moon_This Can't Be Love"	2:39
3.	"Nature Boy 1"	4:04
4.	"Walkin' My Baby Back Home"	2:06
5.	"Dance Ballerina, Dance"	2:31
6.	"Day In-Day Out"	2:48
7.	"The End of a Love Affair"	2:27
8.	"Smile"	2:11
9.	"L-O-V-E"	2:36
10.	"Lover, Come Back To Me"	2:25
11.	"Orange Coloured Sky"	2:20
12.	"Straighten Up And Fly Right"	2:47
13.	"Sweet Lorraine/Love Is Here To Stay"	3:05
14.	"The Best Thing For You"	1:47
15.	"On the Street Where You Live"	3:08
16.	"Somewhere Along The Way"	3:32
17.	"Let There Be Love"	2:36
18.	"When I Fall in Love"	2:49
Total length:		47:50
