= In the Lounge with Gary Williams =

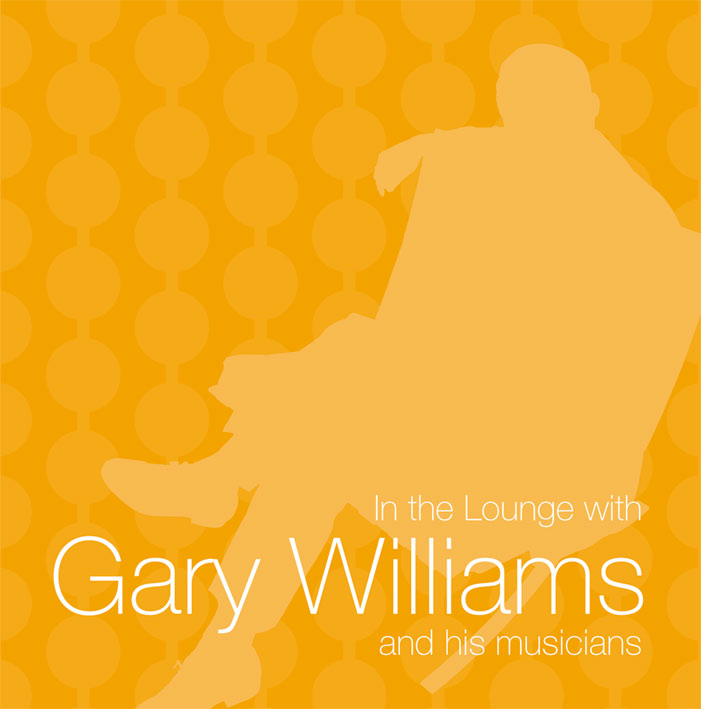

Studio album by Gary Williams
- Released: March 11, 2006
- Recorded: Abbey Road Studios
- Genre: jazz
- Label: Vocalion
- Producer: John Wilson

Gary Williams chronology
Alone Together (2004)	In the Lounge with Gary Williams (2006)	Swingin' on Broadway (2008)

In the Lounge with Gary Williams is jazz vocalist Gary Williams's second album, recorded at Abbey Road Studios and released in 2006. It is a collection of arrangements played by jazz musicians.

== Critical reception ==
The album was warmly welcomed by critics and reviewers.

Clive Fuller of In Tune commented: "This 17-track and 48-minute selection is one of the most relaxed albums that I have heard. I attribute this to the superb combination of the vocalist, musicians, arrangements and material lending itself to the gentle swing that is achieved throughout the set... The songs are ideally suited to the atmosphere that Gary wanted to achieve and he gets 10 out 10 for achieving just that."

David Ades of Journal Into Melody said: "Gary’s approach to his lyrics, and his empathy with his musicians demand your full attention, and his choice of numbers confirms what a wonderful period in history the last century was for high quality popular songs. Being the supreme professional that he is, Gary occasionally surprises by slipping in a verse that others have not treated us to previously."

Malcolm Laycock of Big Band World commented: "It shows a more intimate side of Gary and he doesn’t put a foot wrong. He swings when needed. He smooches when needed. He caresses when needed. His phrasing is sure, his intonation spot on. It’s an intelligent reading of a set of ‘standards’ which is never pretentious and always satisfying."

Hilary Porter of The Bournemouth Echo said: "Whether playing this in the lounge or in the car, you are always in good company with Gary. A charming, charismatic performer his vocal skills make him a fine match for the likes of Sinatra and Dean Martin."

== Track listing ==
No.	Title	Length
1.	"Music to Watch Girls By"	3:07
2.	"Sweet Lorraine"	2:50
3.	"I Thought About You"	2:49
4.	"A Swinging Affair"	3:04
5.	"I Can't Give You Anything But Love"	2:28
6.	"I’ve Got the Sun in the Morning"	2:39
7.	"Lover Come Back to Me"	2:51
8.	"Fly Me to the Moon"	2:29
9.	"I’m Glad There Is You"	4:31
10.	"Baubles, Bangles and Beads"	2:48
11.	"Call Me"	2:43
12.	"All That Jazz"	2:04
13.	"Change Partners"	3:17
14.	"Let's Get Lost"	2:27
15.	"Let There Be Love"	2:40
16.	"Life is Just a Bowl of Cherries"	2:30
17.	"As Long As I’m Singing"	2:00
Total length:		47:17

== Personnel ==
Performers

- Graham Harvey – piano
- Dave Chamberlain – bass
- Matt Skelton – drums
- Luke Annesley – horns
- Martin Kershaw – guitar
- Andrew Cottee – vibes

Technical

- Producer – John Wilson
- Executive Producer – Mike Dutton
- Engineer – Chris Bolster
- Assistant Engineer – Scrap Marshall
- Arrangements – Andrew Cottee and Richard Rodney Bennett
