= Live in Brazil =

Live in Brazil may refer to:

- Live in Brazil (Nazareth album) (ru)
- Live in Brazil (The Outfield album)
- Live in Brazil (Dr. Sin album)
- Live in Brazil 2002, an album by Concrete Blonde
- Live in Brazil (Gary Williams album), 2013
