= At the Movies (Gary Williams album) =

At The Movies
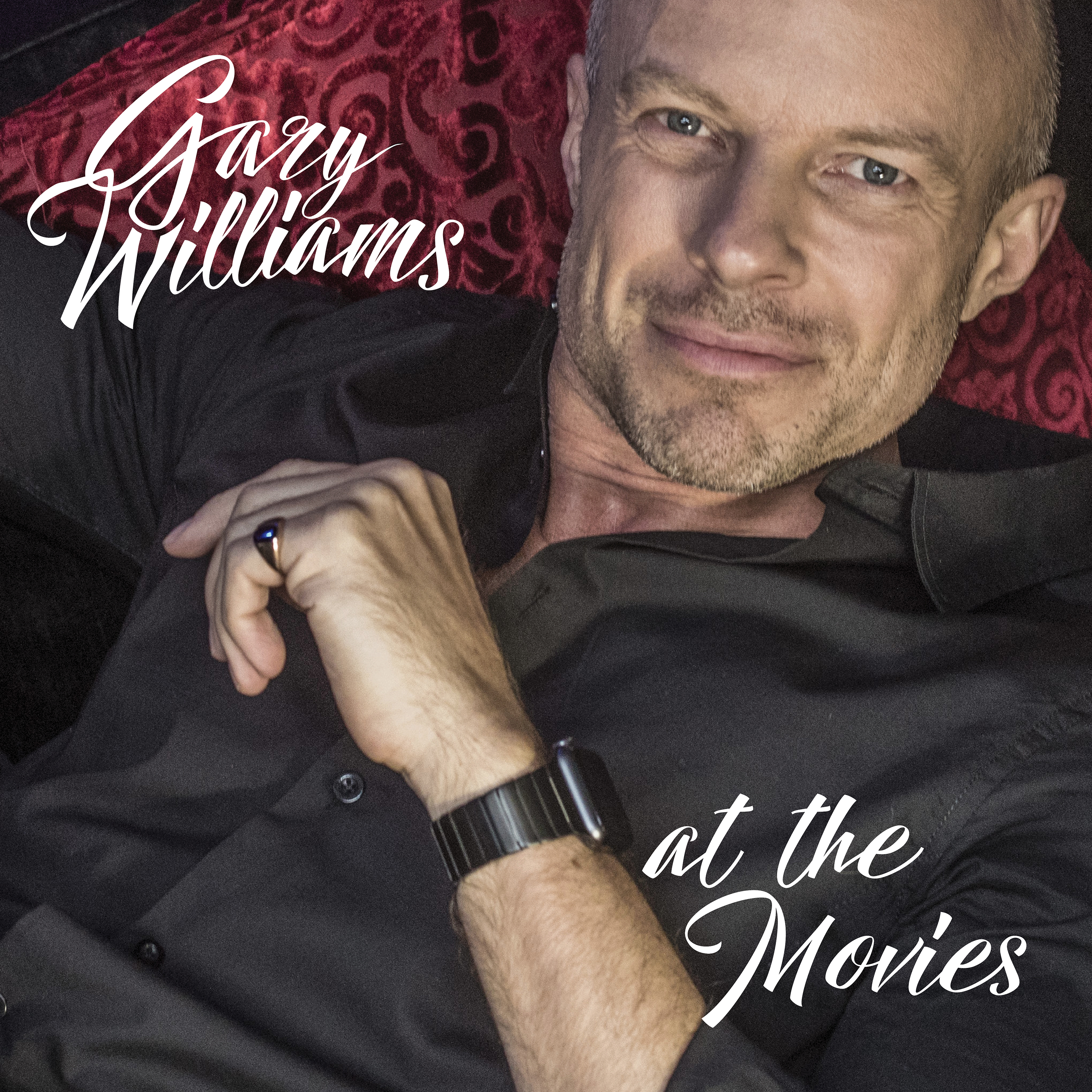

Studio album by Gary Williams
- Released: September 14, 2017
- Recorded: Kenilworth Studios
- Genre: jazz
- Length: 48:31
- Label: BOS Records
- Producer: Gary Williams

Gary Williams chronology
Big Band Wonderland (2015)	At The Movies (2017)	Treasure Seeker (2018)

At The Movies is the ninth album from jazz vocalist Gary Williams. Recorded at Kenilworth Studios in 2017, the album was originally intended to feature only Disney songs but was later expanded to cover songs from the movies. It was recorded with full big band and a jazz combo.

The London Evening Standard awarded the album four stars saying, "This selection of movie tunes sung with Sinatra-esque flair, will transport you down memory lane and get your serotonin levels soaring."

Musical Theatre Review said, "He has such a beautiful voice – just like black velvet and, although the style is not completely to my liking (jazz-orientated) there is something about his voice that is completely mesmerising."

New York's Cabaret Scene's magazine said, "This is one of those perfect, easy-listening albums, excellent for relaxing to after a day at work, or serving as background music at a dinner party."

== Track listing ==
No.	Title	Length
1.	"Spooky"	2:39
2.	"Almost in Love"	3:33
3.	"Both Sides Now"	3:16
4.	"Everybody Wants To Be A Cat"	3:11
5.	"Puppet on a String"	3:26
6.	"He's A Tramp"	3:02
7.	"How Deep Is Your Love"	3:08
8.	"The Bare Necessities"	3:04
9.	"I Need Somebody To Lean On"	3:16
10.	"Baby Mine"	4:17
11.	"When She Loved Me"	2:51
12.	"(They Long To Be) Close To You"	3:37
13.	"Isn't This A Lovely Day"	3:21
14.	"Home Is Where The Heart Is"	3:14
15.	"Pocket Full Of Rainbows"	2:35
Total length:		48:31

== Personnel ==
Performers

- Gary Williams – vocals
- Matt Regan and Clive Dunstall – piano
- Joe Pettitt – bass
- Elliott Henshaw – drums
- Nigel Price – guitar
- Malcolm Melling – trumpet
- Graeme Blevins – saxes/flute
- Adrian Revell – reeds
- Chris Traves – trombone and percussion
- Angela Barnes – French horn
- Anthony Kerr – vibes
- Producer and Studio Engineer: Chris Traves
- Executive Producer: Gary Williams
- Arrangers: Phil Steel (tracks 1, 2, 3, 4, 6, 7, 8, 9, 10, 11, 14, 15 – horns; Caleb Collins (tracks 5, 15); Chris Traves (track 8 – trombones); Paul Campbell (track 12); David Carter (track 13)
