= 1, 2, to the Bass =

Studio album by Stanley Clarke
- Released: April 15, 2003
- Genre: Jazz fusion Jazz funk
- Length: 64:57
- Label: Sony
- Producer: Stanley Clarke

Stanley Clarke chronology
The Bass-ic Collection (1997)	1, 2, to the Bass (2003)	The Toys of Men (2007)

Professional ratings
Review scores
Source	Rating
Allmusic	3/5 stars

1, 2, to the Bass is bassist and composer Stanley Clarke's 26th solo album. It was released by Sony Music Entertainment Inc. on April 13, 2003. The track "Where Is the Love" was nominated for the 2004 Grammy Award for Best R&B Performance By A Duo Or Group With Vocals. 1, 2, to the Bass has been praised for both showcasing Stanley Clarke's ability on the bass, and for its variety of guest artists.

== Track listing ==
No.	Title	Length
1.	"1, 2, to the Bass" (Featuring Q-Tip)	5:57
2.	"Simply Said"	4:34
3.	"Where Is the Love" (Featuring Glenn Lewis & Amel Larrieux)	4:06
4.	"Anna (She Loves the Good Life)"	5:01
5.	"Los Caballos (The Horses)"	4:41
6.	"Just Cruizin'"	4:26
7.	"'Bout the Bass"	7:32
8.	"Hair"	5:14
9.	"Touch"	6:03
10.	"Todos los Ninos (All the Children)"	4:57
11.	"I Shall Not Be Moved"	6:37
12.	"Shanti, Peace, Shalom, Paz"	5:53

== Personnel ==
- Stanley Clarke – bass guitar, double bass, tenor bass, piano, vocals
- Michael Hunter – trumpet
- Reggie Young – trombone
- Everette Harp – saxophone
- Doug Webb – saxophone
- Hubert Laws – flute
- Myron McKinley – keyboards
- George Duke – keyboards
- Bob Leatherbarrow – vibraphone
- L. Subramaniam – violin
- Paul Jackson Jr. – guitar
- Joe Satriani – guitar
- Michael Thompson – guitar
- Jimmy Earl – bass
- Armand Sabal-Lecco – bass
- Reggie Hamilton – bass
- Gerry Brown – drums
- Vinnie Colaiuta – drums
- John "J.R." Robinson – drums
- Amel Larrieux – vocals
- Glenn Lewis – vocals
- Oprah Winfrey – spoken word
- Q-Tip – spoken word, co-producer (track #1)
- Quincy Jones – co-producer (track #11)
- Dre & Vidal – co-producer (track #3)
