= Stargate (soundtrack) =

Stargate (Original Motion Picture Soundtrack)

Soundtrack album by David Arnold
- Released: 1994
- Label: Milan

The Stargate soundtrack was composed by David Arnold, played by the Sinfonia of London and conducted by Nicholas Dodd for the 1994 film, Stargate. It was the second motion picture Arnold had composed and the first major motion picture. At the time of Stargate's production, David Arnold had recently started to work in a local video store in London. Once he got the job, he spent several months in a hotel room working on the soundtrack, spending more time rewriting the music and improving it as delays were being created due to film companies trying to get the rights to release the film. The last 30–40 seconds of the track 'Entering The Stargate' was used several times in the Closing Ceremony of the London 2012 Olympic Games as Arnold was the musical director of the event. Other selections of the score were also used in trailers for other films including Waterworld (1995), Jumanji (1995), Independence Day (1996), Dragonheart (1996), The Man in the Iron Mask (1998), Lost in Space (1998), The Mummy (1999), Dungeons & Dragons (2000), The Time Machine (2002), The Polar Express (2004), Sky Captain and the World of Tomorrow (2004), Chicken Little (2005) and Nim's Island (2008).

== Track listings ==
No.	Title	Music	Length
1.	"Stargate Overture"	David Arnold and Sinfonia of London	3:01
2.	"Giza"	David Arnold and Sinfonia of London	2:10
3.	"Unstable"	David Arnold and Sinfonia of London	2:07
4.	"The Coverstones"	David Arnold and Sinfonia of London	0:58
5.	"Orion"	David Arnold and Sinfonia of London	1:29
6.	"The Stargate Opens"	David Arnold and Sinfonia of London	3:58
7.	"You're On the Team"	David Arnold and Sinfonia of London	1:55
8.	"Entering the Stargate"	David Arnold and Sinfonia of London	2:57
9.	"The Other Side"	David Arnold and Sinfonia of London	1:44
10.	"Mastadge Drag"	David Arnold and Sinfonia of London	0:56
11.	"The Mining Pit"	David Arnold and Sinfonia of London	1:34
12.	"King Of the Slaves"	David Arnold and Sinfonia of London	1:15
13.	"Caravan to Nagada"	David Arnold and Sinfonia of London	2:16
14.	"Daniel and Sha'uri"	David Arnold and Sinfonia of London	1:53
15.	"Symbol Discovery"	David Arnold and Sinfonia of London	1:15
16.	"Sarcophagus Opens"	David Arnold and Sinfonia of London	0:55
17.	"Daniel's Mastadge"	David Arnold and Sinfonia of London	0:49
18.	"Leaving Nagada"	David Arnold and Sinfonia of London	4:09
19.	"Ra - The Sun God"	David Arnold and Sinfonia of London	3:22
20.	"The Destruction of Nagada"	David Arnold and Sinfonia of London	2:08
21.	"Myth, Faith, Belief"	David Arnold and Sinfonia of London	2:18
22.	"Procession"	David Arnold and Sinfonia of London	1:43
23.	"Slave Rebellion"	David Arnold and Sinfonia of London	1:00
24.	"The Seventh Symbol"	David Arnold and Sinfonia of London	0:57
25.	"Quartz Shipment"	David Arnold and Sinfonia of London	1:27
26.	"Battle At the Pyramid"	David Arnold and Sinfonia of London	5:02
27.	"We Don't Want to Die"	David Arnold and Sinfonia of London	1:57
28.	"The Surrender"	David Arnold and Sinfonia of London	1:44
29.	"Kasuf Returns"	David Arnold and Sinfonia of London	3:06
30.	"Going Home"	David Arnold and Sinfonia of London	3:09

Running Time: 65 minutes.

=== Stargate: deluxe edition soundtrack ===
In October 2006, a deluxe edition was released, which included seven new tracks adding eight minutes of audio bringing the running time up to 73 minutes.

The new tracks added were:

1. Wild Abduction - Track 02
2. Bomb Assembly - Track 11
3. Eye of Ra - Track 16
4. Execution - Track 28
5. Against the Gods - Track 30
6. Transporter Horror - Track 34
7. Closing Titles (Intro) - Track 37

=== Stargate: 25th Anniversary Expanded Limited Edition ===
In December 2019, La-La Land Records issued a 2-disc set featuring the complete film score and additional music.
