= Passenger 57 =

1992 action thriller film by Kevin Hooks

- Theatrical release poster
- Directed by: Kevin Hooks
- Screenplay by: David Loughery; Dan Gordon
- Story by: Stewart Raffill; Dan Gordon
- Produced by: Dan Paulson; Lee Rich; Dylan Sellers
- Starring: Wesley Snipes; Bruce Payne; Tom Sizemore
- Cinematography: Mark Irwin
- Edited by: Richard Nord
- Music by: Stanley Clarke
- Distributed by: Warner Bros.
- Release date: November 6, 1992
- Running time: 84 minutes
- Country: United States
- Language: English
- Budget: $15 million
- Box office: $66.5 million

Passenger 57 is a 1992 American action thriller film directed by Kevin Hooks. The film stars Wesley Snipes and Bruce Payne, with Snipes portraying security consultant John Cutter who finds himself forced to foil a plot to free captive terrorist Charles Rane during a commercial airline flight. Critical reviews were mixed, but the film was a box-office success, and made Snipes a popular action hero icon.

== Plot ==
British international terrorist and narcotics kingpin Charles Rane, whose career has been dubbed as "The Rane of Terror" by the media, is arrested by the FBI and local authorities in Miami, just as he is about to undergo plastic surgery in order to evade law enforcement. The FBI make plans to return Rane to Los Angeles to stand trial.

Widowed law enforcement veteran John Cutter has served an honorable career as a reputable police officer, decorated soldier, and reliable Secret Service Special Agent known for his tough stance on high-level crimes. Having constantly been haunted by the memories of his wife's death in a convenience store robbery, Cutter has launched a course specializing in training airline flight crews, including flight attendants, in anti-terrorism measures and self-defense. After one class, Cutter is approached by an old friend, Sly Delvecchio, who offers Cutter the vice presidency of a new anti-terrorism unit for his company, Atlantic International Airlines. Cutter is reluctant, but Delvecchio and the company's president, Stuart Ramsey, eventually convince him to accept the offer.

Cutter boards as the 57th passenger on an Atlantic International flight to Los Angeles (a Lockheed L-1011 TriStar), where one of his students, Marti Slayton, is one of the flight attendants. Rane and his two FBI escorts Agents Manning and Duncan are also aboard. After the flight takes off, several henchmen in Rane's employ, posing as flight attendants and passengers, kill Manning and Duncan, release Rane, and secure the plane by also killing the captain. Cutter, in the lavatory at the time, manages to use the plane's on-board phone to warn Delvecchio of the situation, but Cutter is soon caught by Allen, one of Rane's henchmen.

Cutter overpowers Allen and takes his weapon; he then uses him (in a chokehold) as a shield to confront Rane, but an indifferent Rane shows his ruthlessness by murdering both Douglas, a passenger and Allen in cold blood; Cutter realizes he is outmatched and escapes with Marti to the cargo hold. Cutter dispatches another of Rane's men, Vincent, who masquerades as a caterer. Cutter trips circuitry to dump the plane's fuel, forcing Rane to order the surviving pilots to land at a small Louisiana airfield. As Cutter and Marti prepare to escape upon touchdown, Marti is caught by one of the terrorists, Forget, and he kicks Cutter out of the plane. He is arrested by local sheriff Leonard Biggs, who thinks he is a terrorist, and takes him to the airport building.

Rane contacts the field's tower and demands refueling, for which he promises half the passengers will be freed. For every three minutes of resistance or indecision, he will order five passengers to be executed. Rane also falsely asserts that Cutter is one of his own men turned against him. Biggs gives the go-ahead for refueling, and as the passengers are freed, Rane and some of his men escape from the plane. Cutter recognizes the passenger release as a diversion, escapes from Biggs, and chases Rane and his men into a local county fair, where he is able to kill Matthew, one of Rane's men. As Cutter fights with Rane, police arrive and capture Rane, with FBI agents following and confirming Cutter's true identity to Biggs. Rane threatens that if he does not contact the plane and give flight clearance, his men aboard have been instructed to kill the rest of the hostages. The FBI agents arrange to return Rane to the plane, escorted by two agents, with plans to have a sniper take down Rane and allow them to storm the plane to save the hostages. However, the sniper is Vincent, who kills the escorts but is shot dead by Cutter, and Rane makes it inside safely. Rane orders the pilots to take off, while Cutter, with Biggs' help, manages to jump from a car onto the speeding plane (through the nose landing gear) before it takes off.

Inside, Cutter deals with more of Rane's accomplices before getting into a fight with Rane. A bullet blows out one of the plane's windows causing explosive decompression, and a door blows out. Cutter manages to get Rane close to the open door and kicks him out of the plane, where he falls to his death. The plane returns to the airfield, where the FBI agents secure Sabrina Ritchie, Rane's only remaining agent, and the remaining hostages are freed.

Amid congratulations and celebration, Marti and Cutter make their escape into the distance hand-in-hand, but not before Chief Biggs offers them a ride.

== Cast ==
- Wesley Snipes as Chief John Cutter, a veteran law enforcement official turned airline security expert haunted by the death of his wife.
- Bruce Payne as Charles Rane, a sadistic international terrorist mastermind and drug lord who hijacked the jet to escape custody.
- Tom Sizemore as Sly Delvecchio, Cutter's old friend who offers him a high-ranking job.
- Alex Datcher as Marti Slayton, a flight attendant on board the jet. Cutter's love interest.
- Bruce Greenwood as Stuart Ramsey, the president of Atlantic International Airlines.
- Robert Hooks as Dwight Henderson, an FBI agent.
- Elizabeth Hurley as Sabrina Ritchie, Rane's second-in-command and sole henchwoman disguised as a flight attendant.
- Michael Horse as Forgét, Rane's henchman.
- Marc Macaulay as Vincent, Rane's henchman.
- Ernie Lively as Chief Leonard Biggs, the local sheriff.
- Duchess Tomasello as Mrs. Edwards
- William Edward Roberts as Matthew, Rane's henchman.
- James Short as Allen
- Joel Fogel as Dr. Bauman
- Jane McPherson as Nurse
- Elena Ayala as Lisa Cutter
- Michael Moss as Agent Manning
- Jim McDonald as Agent Duncan
- Frank Causey as Captain Whitehurst
- Dennis Letts as Frank Allen
- Gary Rorman as Douglas
- Brett Rice as Cop

== Production ==
=== Development ===
The film was based on a script by Stewart Raffill. It was written as an action film for an actor like Clint Eastwood, about a man going to bury his son in Spain who sat next to an Iranian terrorist on the plane. The terrorist hijacks the plane and takes the passengers to Iran. Then the Clint Eastwood type character escapes, captures the Mullahs and holds them as prisoners in exchange for American prisoners.

Raffill says "The head of the studio said to me, "If I make that movie, they'll blow up the theaters." So I did a couple of re-writes for them, for Warner Bros. who owned it, then I got another picture and came back and then it became a black movie." Raffill says his work only remains in the first quarter of the resulting film. Raffill could not think of a title for the film but noticed a bottle of ketchup and was inspired by the Heinz 57 mark to call the film Passenger 57.

=== Filming ===
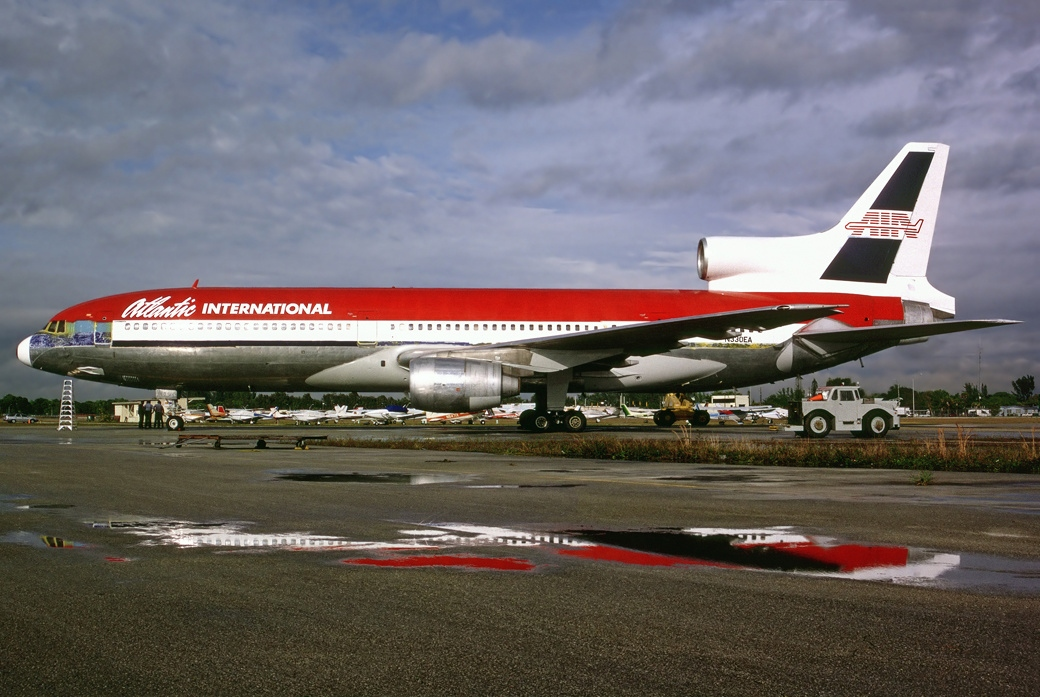
The aircraft that was used in the film with the "Atlantic International" livery

Although supposedly set partly at a small airport in Louisiana, filming took place between January 13 and February 26, 1992, in Wesley Snipes' hometown of Orlando, Florida, with Orlando Sanford International Airport standing in for Lake Lucille Airport in Louisiana. The airport's former combination main hangar and control tower from its time as Naval Air Station Sanford was used for many key scenes just prior to its demolition after filming.

== Music ==
=== Soundtrack ===
Passenger 57: Original Motion Picture Soundtrack

Film score by Stanley Clarke
- Released: November 10, 1992
- Studios: Cherokee Studios, Hollywood; Warner Bros. Studios, Burbank
- Genres: Jazz fusion; orchestral
- Length: 52:06
- Label: Epic Records
- Producer: Stanley Clarke

Stanley Clarke chronology
Live 1976–1977 (1991)	Passenger 57 (1992)	East River Drive (1993)

Professional ratings
Review scores
Source	Rating
AllMusic	2.5/5 stars

Passenger 57's soundtrack was composed by jazz bassist Stanley Clarke, and features both jazz fusion and more traditional grand orchestral pieces. A soundtrack album was issued by Epic Records on CD and cassette to coincide with the film's release. However, the main title theme was strangely omitted from it, and can instead be found on the later collection, Stanley Clarke: At the Movies. The track "Chaos on the Tarmac" has been re-used for the trailer of another action film, Sudden Death. A cover of Stevie Wonder's "Too High" by Norman Brown also features in the film.

== Release ==
=== Home media ===
The film was released on video in the United States and the United Kingdom by Warner Home Video in October 1993 and September 1994. It was released on DVD in Region 1 in the United States on May 27, 1998, and Region 2 in the United Kingdom on April 26, 1999.

== Reception ==
=== Box office ===
Passenger 57 was released on November 6, 1992, and opened at number one rank in 1,734 theaters. The opening weekend receipts were $10,513,925. The film's final US domestic gross receipts were $44,065,653. Internationally, the film grossed $22,437,000, for a worldwide total of $66,502,653. Passenger 57 is one of the films that launched Wesley Snipes' career in the action genre. Because of this film's success, Snipes was cast in lead roles of other features, including Money Train, Drop Zone, Demolition Man, The Art of War and the Blade trilogy.

=== Critical response ===
The film received mixed reviews. Critics praised Wesley Snipes and Bruce Payne's performances, but panned the script. On Rotten Tomatoes it has an approval rating of 30% based on 27 reviews, with an average rating of 4.5/10. The consensus states: "Wesley Snipes tries to pilot Passenger 57 away from turbulence, but even he can't help this implausible coach-class action bomber from nose-diving." Audiences polled by CinemaScore gave the film an average grade of "B" on an A+ to F scale.

Marcus Trower, of Empire magazine, stated that Bruce Payne was "a brilliantly disconcerting madman. With his flowing blond Jesus locks, armor-piercing stare and casual sadism, he makes Hannibal Lecter look like a social worker – and like Sir Anthony Hopkins's serial killer, part of the man's menace is in the apparent contradiction between his articulate, well-spoken English and his off-hand brutality." The Radio Times stated that Payne and Snipes both gave 'charismatic turns' in the film. The New York Times stated that Payne brought a 'tongue-in-cheek humor to the psychopathic fiend' that he played. A reviewer for People magazine stated that "Bruce Payne steals the plane—and the movie".
