= The Bass-ic Collection =

The Bass-Ic Collection

Compilation album by Stanley Clarke
- Released: October 28, 1997
- Genre: Jazz fusion
- Length: 68:57
- Label: Epic
- Producer: Ken Scott

Stanley Clarke chronology
At the Movies (1995)	The Bass-Ic Collection (1997)	1, 2, to the Bass (2003)

Professional ratings
Review scores
Source	Rating
Allmusic	4/5 stars
Pittsburgh Post-Gazette	3/5 stars

The Bass-ic Collection is a Stanley Clarke compilation album released in 1997.

== Track listing ==
All tracks composed by Stanley Clarke, except where indicated.

1. "School Days" – 7:49
2. "Wild Dog" (Clarke, George Duke) - 3:31
3. "We Supply" (Clarke, Louis Johnson) - 4:11
4. "Mothership Connection (Star Child)" (Bernie Worrell, Bootsy Collins, George Clinton) - 4:16
5. "Journey to Love" – 4:42
6. "Hello Jeff" – 5:14
7. "I Wanna Play for You" – 5:13
8. "Silly Putty" – 4:40
9. "Hot Fun" – 2:30
10. "Rock 'n' Roll Jelly" – 5:06
11. "Jamaican Boy" – 3:26
12. "Lost in a Thought" – 5:11
13. "Between Love and Magic" – 4:09
14. "Life Suite" – 8:59

== Personnel ==
- Stanley Clarke – bass
- Brandon Fields – tenor saxophone
- Kirk Whalum – tenor saxophone
- Jerry Hey – trumpet
- George Bohanon – trombone
- Todd Cochran – organ
- George Duke – piano, keyboards, vocals, rap
- David Sancious – guitar, keyboards
- Jeff Beck – guitar
- Ray Gomez – guitar
- Louis Johnson – bass, vocals
- Steve Gadd – drums
- Tony Williams – drums
- Darryl Brown – drums
- Carmine Appice – drums
- Dennis Chambers – drums
- Harvey Mason – drums
- John "J.R." Robinson – drums
- Gerry Brown – drums, handbells
- Phil Perry – vocals, rap
- Philip Bailey – vocals, rap
- Leon "Ndugu" Chancler – vocals, rap
- Carl Carwell – vocals, rap
- Darrell Cox – vocals, rap
- Dee Dee Bridgewater – background vocals

Brass

- Al Aarons – brass
- Stewart Blumberg – brass
- Garnett Brown – brass
- James Buffington – brass
- Buddy Childers – brass
- Jon Faddis – brass
- Robert Findley – brass
- Peter Gordon – brass
- Gary Grant – brass
- Lew McCreary – brass
- Jack Nimitz – brass
- William Peterson – brass
- Dalton Smith – brass
- Lew Soloff – brass
- Dave Taylor – brass

Strings

- Marilyn Baker – strings
- Carol Buck – strings
- Thomas Buffum – strings
- David Campbell – strings
- Harry Cykman – strings
- Rollice Dale – strings
- Robert Dubow – strings
- Paul Gershman – strings
- Emanuel Green – strings
- Karen Jones – strings
- Dennis Karmazyn – strings
- Harold Kohon – strings
- Beverly Lauridsen – strings
- Jesse Levy – strings
- Gordon Marron – strings
- Lya Stern – strings
- John Wittenberg – strings

== Production ==
- Ken Scott – producer
- Brian Gardner – mastering
