= Swingin' on Broadway =

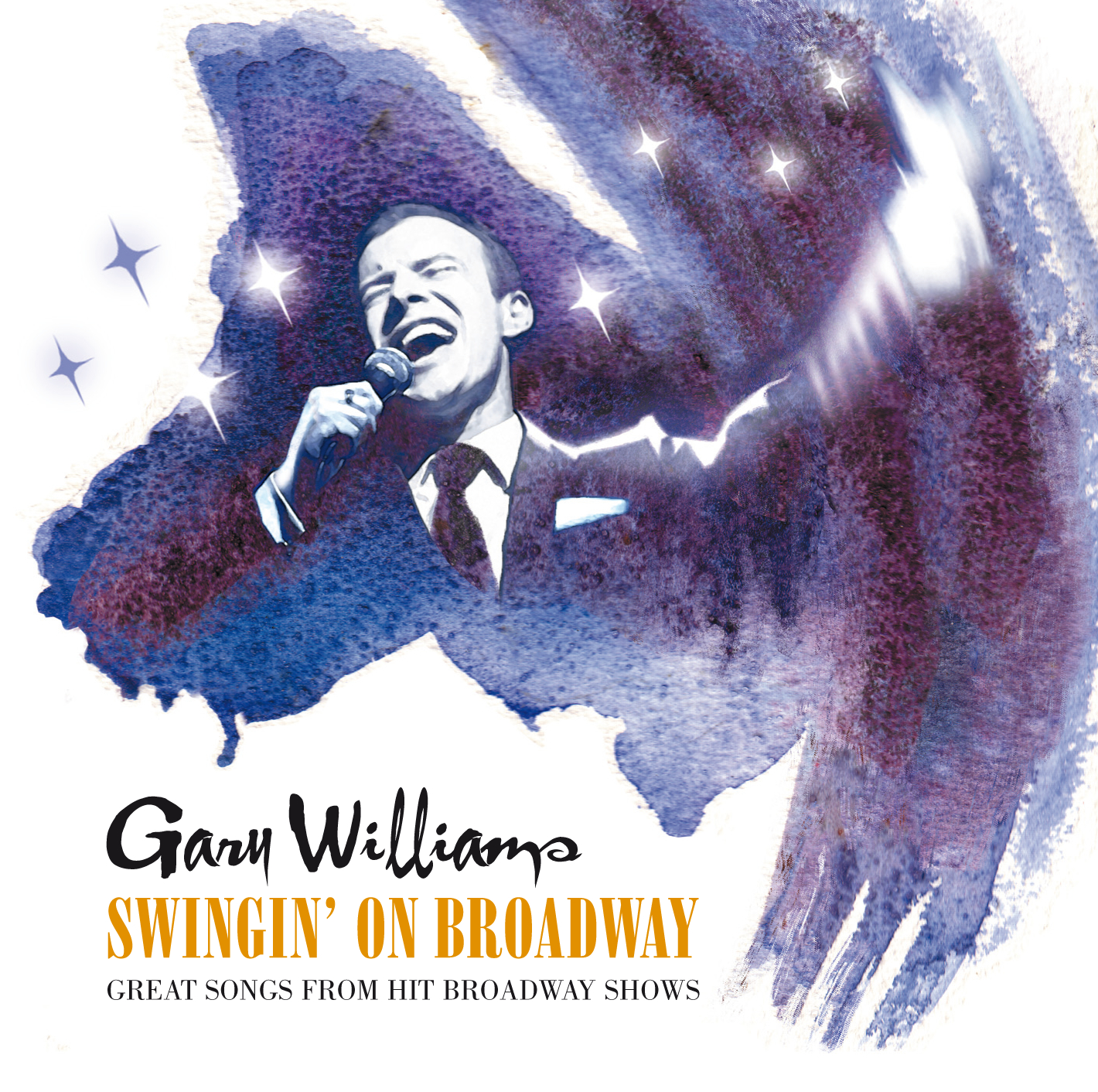

Studio album by Gary Williams
- Released: February 1, 2008
- Recorded: Abbey Road Studios
- Genre: musical
- Label: Vocalion
- Producer: John Wilson, Mike Dutton

Gary Williams chronology
In the Lounge with Gary Williams (2006)	Swingin' on Broadway (2008)	Gary Williams Meets Frank Sinatra (2010)

Swingin' on Broadway is jazz vocalist Gary Williams's third album, recorded at Abbey Road Studios and released in 2008. It is a collection of songs from some of the most famous Broadway musicals.

== Critical reception ==
The album was released to positive reviews.

Malcolm Laycock of Big Band World gave it five stars and commented: "It’s a well-paced CD of enjoyable variety, skilfully performed. Gary’s in great voice and all’s well. I think I would rate this his best showing to date. Impressive sound balance achieved by producers John Wilson and Mike Dutton."

Clive Fuller of Encore said: "From the opening song “Chim Chim Cheree” from Mary Poppins through to “Always Look on the Bright Side of Life” from Spamalot the pace is well handled both vocally and instrumentally with plenty of opportunity for the soloists to shine... This is a must have CD."

== Track listing ==
No.	Title	Length
1.	"Chim Chim Cheree" (from Mary Poppins)	2:30
2.	"All I Need Is The Girl" (from Gypsy)	2:08
3.	"This Can't Be Love" (from The Boys from Syracuse)	2:36
4.	"Anything Goes" (from Anything Goes)	2:31
5.	"On the Street Where You Live" (from My Fair Lady)	3:45
6.	"Who Will Buy" (from Oliver!)	2:27
7.	"You’re Never Fully Dressed Without A Smile" (from Annie)	2:40
8.	"It's A Fine Day For Walking Country Style" (from Miss Chicken Little)	3:26
9.	"On a Clear Day You Can See Forever" (from On a Clear Day You Can See Forever)	2:26
10.	"My Favourite Things" (from The Sound of Music)	2:19
11.	"The Surrey with the Fringe On Top" (from Oklahoma!)	4:44
12.	"Isn't It A Pity" (from Pardon My English)	4:44
13.	"Wonderful" (from Wicked)	2:53
14.	"Save The Last Dance For Me" (from Dirty Dancing)	2:48
15.	"Always Look on the Bright Side Of Life" (from Spamalot)	3:23
Total length:		45:20

== Personnel ==
Performers

- Gary Williams – vocals
- Clive Dunstall – piano
- Luke Annesley – sax
- Phil Lee – guitar
- Richard Rodney Bennett – celeste
- Justin Woodward – vibraphone

Technical

- Producer – John Wilson
- Executive Producer – Mike Dutton
- Arrangements – Andrew Cottee, Clive Dunstall and Richard Rodney Bennett
