= Legends (Gary Williams album) =

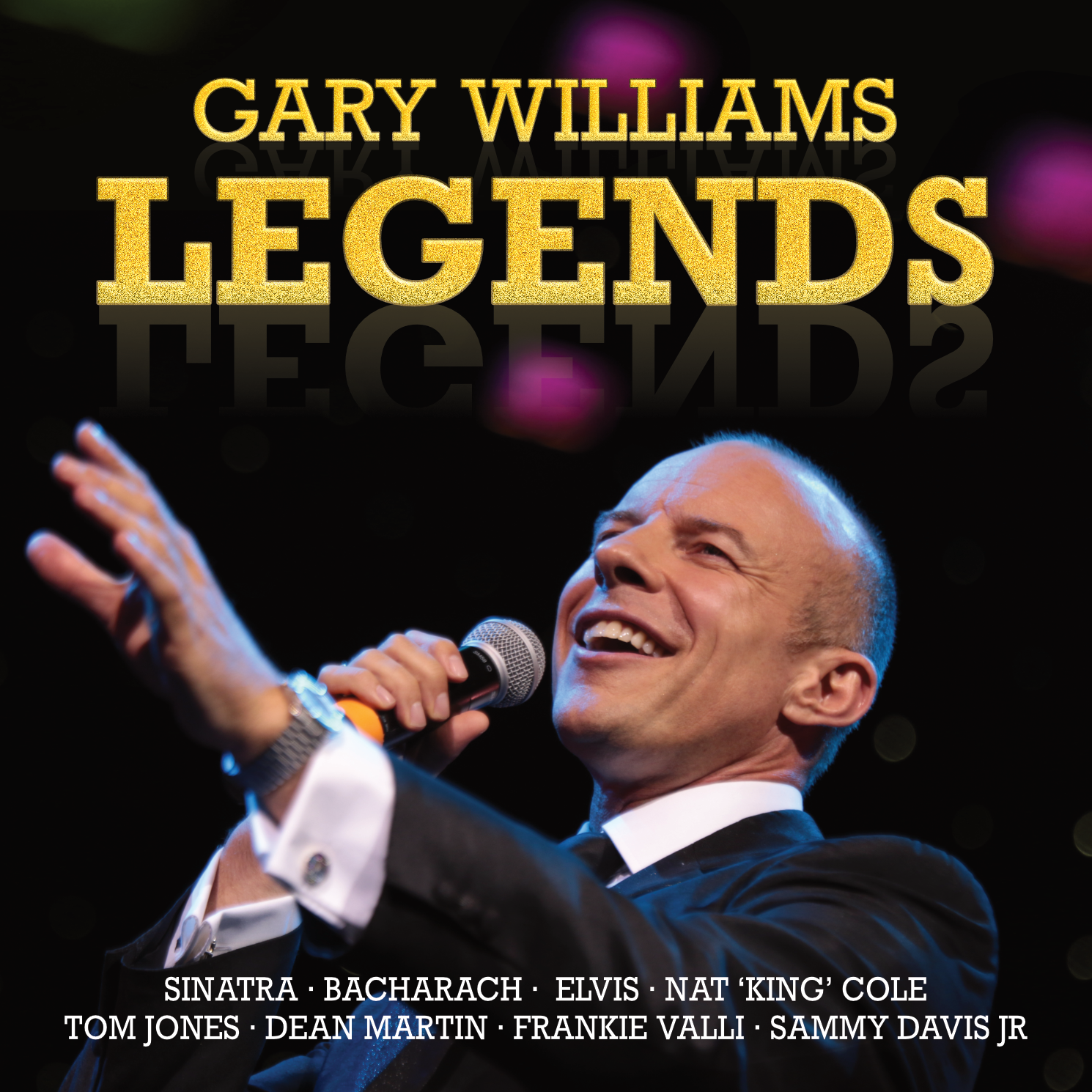

Studio album by Gary Williams
- Released: December 6, 2019
- Recorded: Kenilworth Studios
- Genre: jazz
- Length: 65:23
- Label: BOS Records
- Producer: Gary Williams

Gary Williams chronology
Treasure Seeker (2018)	Legends (2019)

Legends is the eleventh album from jazz vocalist Gary Williams. Recorded at Kenilworth Studios in 2019, it is a tribute to the stars of Las Vegas including Tom Jones, Elvis Presley and The Rat Pack. It was recorded with big band and a jazz combo.

Writing about the album, the Grimsby Telegraph said that Leslie Bricusse "has become a great fan of Gary’s voice" and quoted him saying: "Songs like these make you want the ghosts of Mel Tormé and Matt Monro to come back and sing them. Until they do, Gary Williams is their worthy guardian. Michael Buble please note!"

Nick Wakeman reviewing for Musical Theatre Review gave the album 5 stars and said: "Williams is a consummate cabaret artist whose delivery is immaculate. These aren’t carbon copies of the original, he doesn’t try to be Sinatra or Martin but gives his own interpretation. Sometimes that could go too far but he always manages to reign it in and keep the essence of the original – which is very clever."

== Track listing ==
No.	Title	Length
1.	"Bacharach Medley"	5:35
2.	"Matt Monro Medley"	3:42
3.	"Sammy Davis Jr Medley"	4:28
4.	"Mr Bojangles"	4:02
5.	"Mack The Knife"	3:18
6.	"Route 66"	2:45
7.	"Can't Take My Eyes Off You"	3:28
8.	"You're My World"	2:47
9.	"Latin Medley"	4:13
10.	"Dean Martin Medley"	5:28
11.	"One Second To Decide"	2:12
12.	"Elvis Medley"	4:20
13.	"And I Love You So"	3:30
14.	"Till"	2:14
15.	"My Way"	3:58
16.	"That's Life"	3:06
17.	"Theme From New York, New York"	2:49
18.	"Once Before I Go"	3:28
Total length:		65:23

== Personnel ==
Performers

- Gary Williams – vocals
- Piano/keys – Clive Dunstall, Matt Regan
- Bass – Joe Pettitt
- Drums – Elliott Henshaw
- Guitar – Tommy Emmerton, Tim Rose, Justin Quinn
- Trombone and Percussion – Chris Traves
- Reeds – Adrian Revell
- Trumpet – Malcolm Melling
- Arrangers – Phil Steel, David Carter, Paul Campbell, Mike Brown
- Recorded at Kenilworth Studios
- Producer and Studio Engineer: Chris Traves
- Executive Producer: Gary Williams
