= Let There Be Love (1993 Joni James album) =

Compilation album by Joni James
- Released: March 1, 1993
- Genre: Traditional pop
- Label: Jasmine Records

Let There Be Love is an album of songs recorded by Joni James as airchecks, released by Jasmine Records on March 1, 1993. While many of the songs included on the album were hits for Joni James in the 1950s, these are different performances.

== Track listing ==
Track number	Song title	Songwriter(s)	Orchestra	Time
1	Let There Be Love	Lionel Rand/Ian Grant	Ralph Marterie	1:57
2	You're My Everything	Harry Warren/Joe Young/Mort Dixon	Ralph Marterie	2:22
3	You're Fooling Someone	Leo Fox/Wayne Muir/Frank LaVere/Wally Griffith	Ralph Marterie	1:52
4	Am I in Love?	Ted Varnick	Ralph Marterie	2:34
5	My Love, My Love	Nicholas Acquaviva/Bob Haymes	Ralph Marterie	2:29
6	Purple Shades	Lew Douglas/Frank LaVere	Ralph Marterie	3:01
7	Almost Always	Lew Douglas	Ralph Marterie	1:54
8	I'll Be Seeing You	Sammy Fain/Irving Kahal	Ralph Marterie	2:10
9	When We Come of Age	Norman Gimbel	Tony Pastor	1:50
10	These Foolish Things	Harry Link/Holt Marvell/Jack Strachey	Tony Pastor	3:13
11	It's the Talk of the Town	Jerry Livingston/Al J. Neiburg/Marty Symes	Tony Pastor	2:44
12	Too Late Now	Alan Jay Lerner/Burton Lane	Tony Pastor	2:26
13	In Love in Vain	Leo Robin/Jerome Kern	Tony Pastor	2:45
14	That Old Feeling	Sammy Fain/Lew Brown	Tony Pastor	2:22
15	I'm Through With Love	Gus Kahn/Fud Livingston/Matty Malneck	Tony Pastor	2:11
16	Little Girl Blue	Richard Rodgers/Lorenz Hart	Tony Pastor	2:40
