= Bob Leatherbarrow =

American drummer

- Born: May 3, 1955 (age 69); Buffalo, New York, US
- Genres: Jazz
- Occupation(s): Musician, composer
- Instrument(s): Drums, percussion, vibraphone

Bob Leatherbarrow (born 3 May 1955) is a jazz drummer and vibraphonist who lives and works in Los Angeles.

Leatherbarrow was born in Buffalo, New York. During his career, Leatherbarrow has played with Rosemary Clooney, Natalie Cole, Peggy Lee, and Ernie Watts, His debut album as leader, Bumpin' in the Basement, was released in 1999.
