= Alone Together (Gary Williams album) =

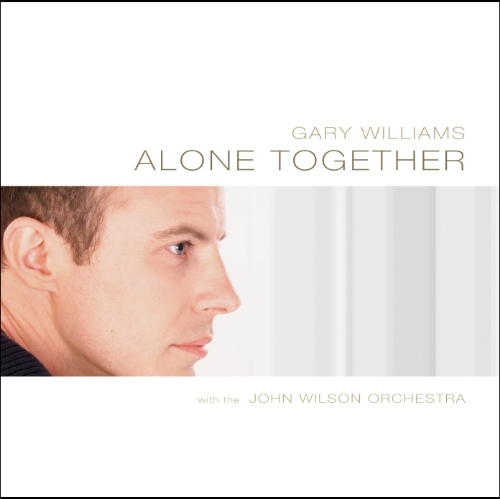

Studio album by Gary Williams
- Released: August 1, 2004
- Studio: Abbey Road Studios, London, England
- Length: 54:07
- Label: Vocalion

Gary Williams chronology
Alone Together (2004)	In the Lounge with Gary Williams (2006)

Alone Together is the debut album by vocalist Gary Williams. It was recorded with the John Wilson Orchestra at Abbey Road Studios and released in 2004. It is a collection of ballads and swing standards arranged by Andrew Cottee.

== Critical reception ==
Clive Davis of The Sunday Times commented: "Michael Buble is the not only singer keeping the Sinatra flame alive. Britain's Gary Williams has, in fact, been working this side of the saloon for quite some time... His model this time is not so much the insouciant playboy of Songs for Swingin' Lovers as the pure romantic of In the Wee Small Hours."

Malcolm Laycock of Big Band World said: "A collection of gentle ballads from the Great American Songbook, stunningly sung by Gary and perfectly accompanied by John Wilson. The fresh arrangements by Andrew Cottee are simply beautiful. I'll stick my neck out and say I think this is the finest vocal record of its kind to emerge from Britain since the days of Matt Monro."

Roy Booth of Jazz Views commented: "Gary's reading of Alec Wilder's "I'll Be Around" is probably the best I have heard since Sinatra's version on his "Wee Small Hours" album and the beautiful alto playing is the icing on the cake."

== Track listing ==
No.	Title	Length
1.	"Just In Time"	2:26
2.	"Where or When"	3:23
3.	"Why Shouldn't I"	3:31
4.	"Just One of Those Things"	4:08
5.	"I Remember You"	3:35
6.	"I Get Along Without You Very Well"	3:16
7.	"If I Had You"	3:57
8.	"More Than You Know"	4:13
9.	"You're Sensational"	3:11
10.	"My Buddy"	3:41
11.	"I'll Be Around"	3:49
12.	"Time After Time"	4:04
13.	"End of A Love Affair"	3:53
14.	"They Can't Take That Away from Me"	4:20
15.	"Alone Together"	2:47
Total length:		54:07
