= Sarah Fox =

English operatic soprano

Sarah Fox (born 19 September 1973) is an English operatic soprano who has performed at several of the world's leading opera houses, notably the Royal Opera House Covent Garden.

Fox was born in Giggleswick, Settle, West Riding of Yorkshire. She was educated at Royal Holloway, University of London (BMus, 1995) and the Royal College of Music in London. She won the Kathleen Ferrier Award in 1997 and the John Christie Award in 2000. She was awarded an Honorary Fellowship from Royal Holloway in May 2012.

== Career ==
In 2000, Fox made her debut for the Glyndebourne Festival as Karolka (Jenufa), returning in 2002 as Zerlina (Don Giovanni) and in 2003 as Susanna (Le nozze di Figaro). Of her Susanna in Le Nozze di Figaro at the Glyndebourne Festival Barbarina Diana, writing in Il giornale della musica described her performance at Glyndebourne as "a delight for the eye and heart, whose voice, fresh and crystal clear is blessed with a rare beauty accompanied by a strong musicality: 'Deh vieni' interpreted without affectation, directed to her beloved, takes your breath away".

With Glyndebourne on tour she has sung Marzelline (Fidelio) and Miss Wordsworth (Albert Herring). In 2004, she made her debut with the Royal Opera Covent Garden as Woglinde (Das Rheingold), returning to the house in 2005 as Waldvogel (Siegfried) and in 2006 as Woglinde (Götterdämmerung). In 2007 she sang Zerlina (Don Giovanni) and Woglinde (Das Rheingold and Götterdämmerung; in 2008, Lucy Lockitt in The Beggars Opera and in 2009, Asteria in Handel's "Tamerlano." Further British engagements include Ann Page (Sir John in Love) with English National Opera, Merab (Saul), Musetta and Mimi (La Bohème) with Opera North, and Servilia (La clemenza di Tito) with Welsh National Opera.

At the Edinburgh Festival, her roles have included Iphis (Jephtha) and Cleofide (Poro).

Fox made her international debut as Ilia (Idomeneo) with De Vlaamse Opera. In 2005, she made her debut with the Bayerische Staatsoper in Munich as Michal (Saul), returning to the house in 2006 as Eurydice (Orphée et Eurydice). In 2008 and 2009, she sang Asteria in Handel's Tamerlano. She is scheduled to revive the role opposite Plácido Domingo at the Gran Teatre del Liceu in Barcelona in 2011.

She made her debut at the Salzburg Festival in 2005 as Second Niece (Peter Grimes) and returned to the Festival in 2007 as Woglinde (Das Rheingold). Further European engagements include Susanna (Le nozze di Figaro) for the Royal Danish Opera, Arianna (Arianna in Creta) for the Nationale Reisoper and Karolka (Jenufa) at the Deutsche Oper Berlin. In 2004, Fox made her North American debut as Zerlina (Don Giovanni) at the Cincinnati Opera.

Fox has an extensive concert repertoire and has been particularly associated with the British Broadcasting Corporation, The Bach Choir and the Choir of King's College, Cambridge. She has also performed abroad with many of the world's leading orchestras including the San Francisco Symphony, the Chamber Orchestra of Europe, the Berlin Philharmonic and the Minnesota Orchestra.

In 2009, she performed with the City of Birmingham Symphony Orchestra in Mahler's Symphony No. 2; toured throughout Europe and the US in Handel's Athalia with Ivor Bolton and the Concerto Koln; and sang in Handel's Acis and Galatea with the Gabrieli Consort at the Beaune Festival. She also starred in the BBC MGM Prom with Sir Thomas Allen, Seth MacFarlane, John Wilson and the John Wilson Orchestra in 2009.
