= Big Band Wonderland =

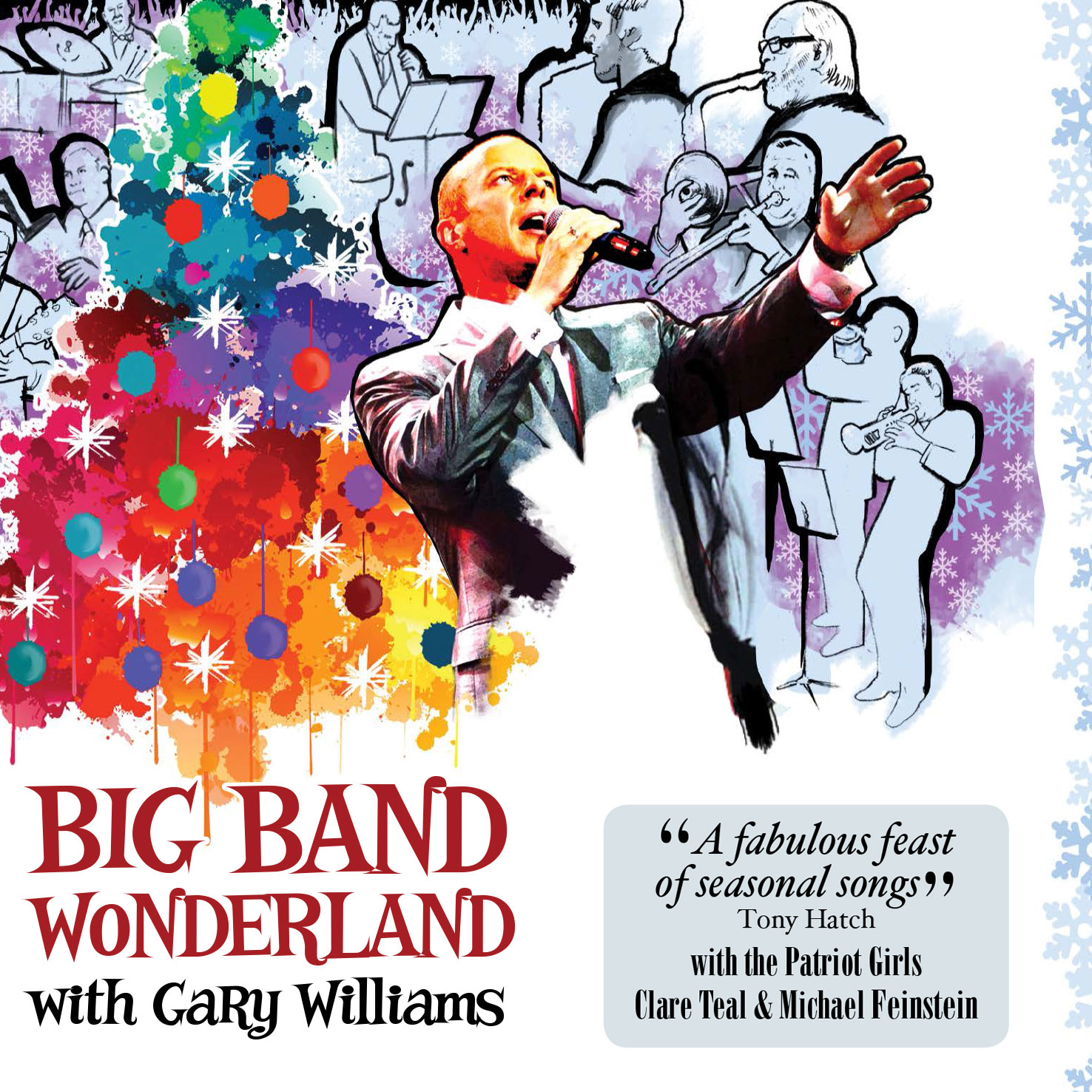

Studio album by Gary Williams
- Released: September 14, 2015
- Recorded: Kenilworth Studios
- Genre: big band
- Length: 39:33
- Label: BOS Records

Gary Williams chronology
Live in Brazil (2013)	Big Band Wonderland (2015)

Big Band Wonderland is jazz vocalist Gary Williams's eighth album, recorded in Kenilworth Studios in 2015. It is a collection of Christmas classics, recorded with full big band and featuring duets with Clare Teal and Michael Feinstein. More than half of the money for the album was raised with a crowd-funding appeal.

This is how Williams described his love of Christmas: "I was raised as a Jehovah's Witness, so I didn't celebrate Christmas till I was sixteen years old. When all my mates where out singing carols I was sitting at home cataloguing my stamp collection! Maybe that's why I love Christmas so much now, I'm making up for lost time."

His live Christmas show was given five stars by the London Evening Standard which described Gary as "…the UK's leading standard bearer for the supercool era".

== Track listing ==
No.	Title	Length
1.	"Santa Claus Is Coming To Town"	2:19
2.	"Mistletoe and Holly/Marshmallow World" (with The Patriot Girls)	4:05
3.	"The Christmas Waltz" (with Clare Teal)	2:47
4.	"Rudolph The Red Nosed Reindeer"	2:39
5.	"The Christmas Song" (with The Patriot Girls)	2:42
6.	"Caroling Caroling"	2:54
7.	"Snowbound"	3:34
8.	"Let It Snow"	2:13
9.	"(Everybody's Waitin’ for) The Man with the Bag" (with Michael Feinstein)	2:30
10.	"Winter Wonderland"	2:58
11.	"Sleigh Ride"	2:34
12.	"Jingle Bells"	2:15
13.	"Have Yourself A Merry Little Christmas" (with The Patriot Girls)	3:00
14.	"I'll Be Home For Christmas" (bonus track – download only)	3:03
Total length:		39:33

== Personnel ==
Performers

- Gary Williams – vocals
- Matt Regan – piano
- Joe Pettitt – bass
- Kevin Campbell – drums
- Jon Russell – guitar
- Tom Walsh – trumpets
- Simon Marsh and Jay Craig – saxes
- Chris Traves – trombone
- Anthony Kerr – vibes
- The Patriot Girls (Jo Gibb, Joanne Pullen, Marissa Dunlop)
- Backing Singers: Luke Evered, David Hilton, Victoria Keal, Iain Mackenzie, India Moynihan, Andy Playfoot, Patrick Smyth.

Technical

- Producer and Studio Engineer: Chris Traves
- Executive Producer: Gary Williams
- Backing vocals arranged, directed and produced by Clive Dunstall
- Backing vocals recorded and mixed at Big Al's studio by Alex Bourne, and Tileyard Studios by Sean Hargreaves
- Arrangers: Phil Steel (tracks 1, 2, 3); Paul Campbell (tracks 4, 5, 8, 10, 11, 12); Andrew Cottee (tracks 7, 13); Callum Au (tracks 6, 9)
