= Live in Brazil (Gary Williams album) =

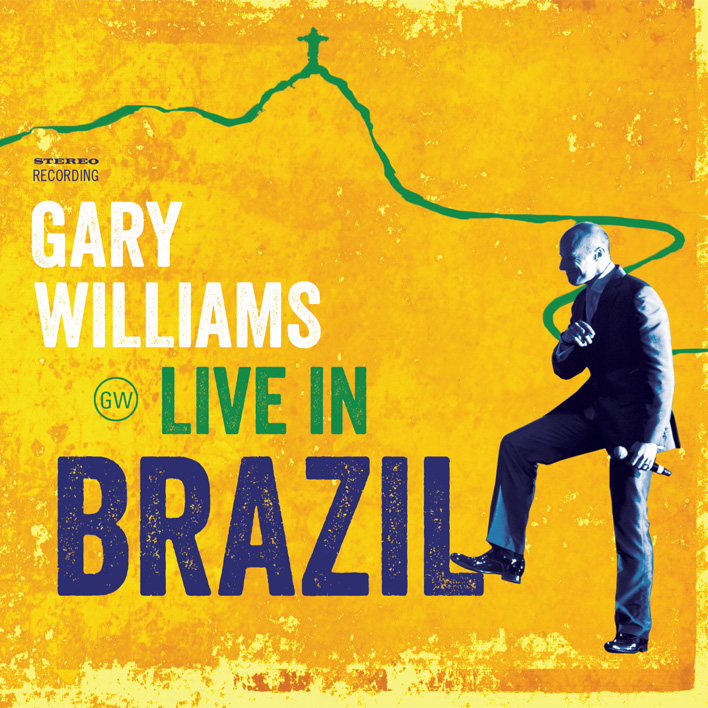

Live album by Gary Williams
- Released: May 2, 2013
- Recorded: MS Splendour of the Seas
- Genre: big band
- Length: 1:01:36
- Label: BOS Records

Gary Williams chronology
Let There Be Love (2011)	Live in Brazil (2013)	Big Band Wonderland (2015)

Live in Brazil is jazz vocalist Gary Williams's seventh album, recorded live onboard Royal Caribbean's ship Splendour of the Seas in 2013. It includes big band covers of songs by Gipsy Kings, Antônio Carlos and Tom Jobim, Frank Sinatra, Lady Gaga and Kylie Minogue. One song is recorded in English, German and Japanese. The live show was seen by over 20,000 Brazilians in 8 months.

== Critical reception ==
The album was received well by critics and reviewers.

Clive Fuller of Encore said: "It is always difficult to transfer a "live" performance to an album as the contact between performer and audience is so much a part of the success of the show. This album brings with it all the atmosphere of a modern cabaret/stage show. Gary is in fine voice throughout and is backed by a really lively orchestra led by musical director & pianist/keyboards Jack Borkofski."

Musical Theatre commented: "Williams obviously has what it takes to be a cabaret artist – one of the most difficult occupations for a singer. He has charisma and a great voice."

== Track listing ==
No.	Title	Length
1.	"Coffee Song/Brazil"	2:19
2.	"Can't Take My Eyes Off You"	3:30
3.	"Opening Monologue"	2:43
4.	"Girl From Ipanema (A Garota de Ipanema)"	2:42
5.	"Medley Monologue"	0:43
6.	"Samba Medley: Só Danço Samba/Spanish Flea/One Note Samba"	2:55
7.	"Mas Que Nada"	3:29
8.	"Amigo"	2:54
9.	"Samba de Orfeu"	1:47
10.	"Yo Sólo Quiero (Un Millón de Amigos)"	3:14
11.	"Gypsy Kings Medley: Bamboléo/Volaré/Bem, Bem, Mara/Djobi Djoba"	3:25
12.	"L.O.V.E. (English/Japanese/German)"	4:08
13.	"False Start"	1:18
14.	"When I Fall in Love"	1:59
15.	"What A Wonderful World"	3:47
16.	"Lady Gaga Swing Medley: Born This Way/Paparazzi/Marry The Night"	3:45
17.	"The Kylie Minogue Shuffle: Can't Get You Out Of My Head/I Should Be So Lucky"	4:08
18.	"Theme From New York City"	4:01
19.	"Sinatra Monologue"	0:31
20.	"My Way"	4:36
21.	"Closing Monologue"	1:15
22.	"Eu Se Te Pego"	2:27
Total length:		1:01:36

== Personnel ==
Performers

- Gary Williams – vocals
- Jack Borkofski – piano/Keys/MD
- Krzystof Mroz – bass
- Yury Rabtsau – drums
- Tiago Pires da Silva – guitar
- Maxwell Roach – trumpet
- Jerzy Mucha – saxes
- Levgen Proidakov – trombone
- David Musselman, Denis De Souza – backing vocals

Technical

- Sound Engineer – Kay Richardson
- Stage Staff – Keith Bennett, Tiago da Silva, Nicholas Brkovec, Andre Santana
- Production Manager – Vasil Hristov
- Cruise Director – João Wolf
- Mastering – Paul Fawcus, Jazz Mouse Studios, UK
