= Treasure Seeker =

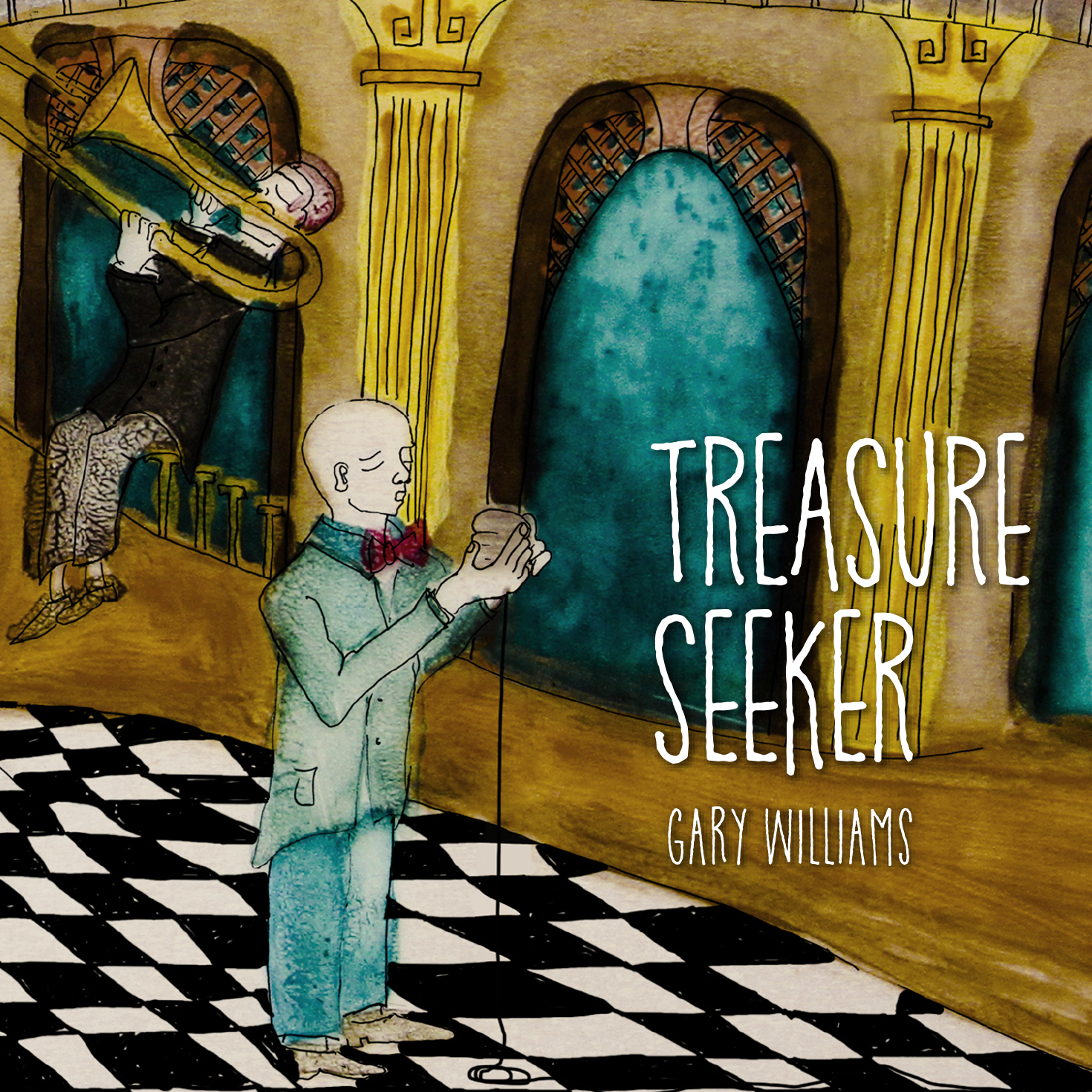

Studio album by Gary Williams
- Released: September 19, 2018
- Recorded: Kenilworth Studios
- Genre: jazz
- Length: 44:03
- Label: BOS Records
- Producer: Gary Williams

Gary Williams chronology
At The Movies (2017)	Treasure Seeker (2018)

Treasure Seeker is the tenth album from jazz vocalist Gary Williams and his first as singer-songwriter. Recorded at Kenilworth Studios in 2018, all songs are co-written with Jonathan Nickoll. It was recorded with full big band and a jazz combo.

Interviewed in the Grimsby Telegraph, Williams said the album's title track was inspired by an article in the newspaper in January 1985, where a 14-year-old Williams showed off his obscure collectables and curiosities.

Nick Wakeman reviewing for Musical Theatre Review gave the album 5 stars and said, "...why did I constantly play this album on repeat for about three hours? ...it may have something to do with the silky-smooth tones of Gary Williams’ voice rendering songs I had never heard before but I am sure I will be hearing a lot more of in the near future"

Jazz critic Michael Ferber said, "This album is of outstanding excellence…"

== Track listing ==
No.	Title	Length
1.	"The Next Big Thing"	2:10
2.	"Never Say I Love You"	3:23
3.	"Kiss Me on a Rainy Day"	3:54
4.	"When Sunday Comes"	2:54
5.	"Don't Trust A Wink"	3:12
6.	"He's A Tramp"	3:02
7.	"Give Me One Second"	2:12
8.	"Growing Pains"	3:34
9.	"I Blame The Moon"	3:43
10.	"Don't Talk About Time"	3:26
11.	"The Dreamer"	4:24
12.	"Our Love Grows Stronger"	4:28
13.	"Treasure Seeker"	3:46
14.	"When Sunday Comes (boogaloo version)"	3:00
Total length:		44:03

== Personnel ==
Performers

- Gary Williams – vocals
- Piano/keys – Clive Dunstall (all tracks except 1 and 7)
- Matt Regan – (tracks 1 and 7)
- Bass – Joe Pettitt (all tracks except 4, 8, 10)
- Lawrence Ungless – (tracks 4, 8, 10)
- Drums – Elliott Henshaw
- Guitar – Tommy Emmerton
- Percussion – Chris Traves
- Saxes – Graeme Blevins
- Reeds – Adrian Revell
- Flute – Mikey Davis
- Trumpet – Malcolm Melling
- Trombone – Chris Traves
- Arranger – Phil Steel
- Writers – Gary Williams and Jon Nickoll
- Recorded at Kenilworth Studios
- Producer and Studio Engineer: Chris Traves
- Executive Producer: Gary Williams
