= At the Movies (Stanley Clarke album) =

Studio album by Stanley Clarke
- Released: August 8, 1995
- Genre: Jazz fusion
- Length: 54:17
- Label: Epic
- Producer: Stanley Clarke

Stanley Clarke chronology
The Rite of Strings (1995)	At the Movies (1995)	The Bass-ic Collection (1997)

Professional ratings
Review scores
Source	Rating
AllMusic	3/5 stars

At the Movies is the twenty-fourth album by jazz bassist Stanley Clarke.

== Track listing ==
All songs written by Stanley Clarke

1. "Passenger 57 Main Title" - Passenger 57 – 3:22
2. "Lisa" - Passenger 57 – 4:33
3. "Justice's Groove" - Poetic Justice – 3:50
4. "Lucky Again" - Poetic Justice – 5:58
5. "Father and Son" - Boyz n the Hood – 1:33
6. "Theme from Boyz n the Hood" - Boyz n the Hood – 6:52
7. "Grandpa's Theme" - Little Big League – 2:25
8. "Higher Learning Main Title" - Higher Learning – 2:31
9. "The Learning Curve" - Higher Learning – 3:29
10. "Anna Mae" - What's Love Got to Do with It – 3:48
11. "Capital/Naty's Theme" - Panther – 2:31
12. "Meeting" - Panther – 1:34
13. "Deja's Theme" - Higher Learning – 4:00
14. "Black on Black Crime" - Boyz n the Hood – 4:38
15. "Max's Theme" - Tap – 3:13

== Personnel ==
- Stanley Clarke – bass, orchestration

== Production ==
- George Del Barrio – Conductor
- Brian Gardner – Mastering
- Dan Humann – Engineer
- Howie Idelson – Design
- William Kidd – Conductor, Orchestration
- John Richards – Engineer
- Steve Sykes – Engineer
- Stephen Walker – Art Direction
- Dan Wallin – Engineer
