= Is It Any Wonder? (Joni James song) =

Single by Joni James
- A-side: "Almost Always"
- Released: April 1953
- Recorded: 1952
- Length: 2:36
- Label: MGM
- Songwriters: Robert J. Hayes; Leroy W. Rodde; Archie Gottler

Joni James singles chronology
"Your Cheatin' Heart" (1953)	"Is It Any Wonder?" (1953)	"My Love, My Love" (1953)

"Is It Any Wonder?" is a popular song, written by Robert J. Hayes, Leroy W. Rodde, and Archie Gottler.

== Overview ==
It was recorded by Joni James in 1953. The recording was released by MGM Records as catalog number 11470. The song was only on the Billboard magazine charts for 1 week; it reached No. 20 on May 2, 1953. The flip side was "Almost Always".

== Other versions ==
Semprini with Rhythm accompaniment recorded it in London on October 13, 1953, as the second song of the medley "Dancing to the piano (No. 22) - Hit medley of Fox Trots" along with "Bridge of Sighs" and "Look at That Girl". The medley was released by EMI on the His Master's Voice label as catalog number B 10592.
