= Almost Always =

Single by Joni James
- B-side: "Is It Any Wonder?"
- Released: April 1953
- Recorded: 1952
- Length: 2:48
- Label: MGM
- Songwriters: Lew Douglas; Frank Lavere; Kathleen Lichty

Joni James singles chronology
"Your Cheatin' Heart" (1953)	"Almost Always" (1953)	"Is It Any Wonder?" (1953)

"Almost Always" is a popular song, written by Lew Douglas, Frank Lavere and Kathleen Lichty. It was recorded by Joni James in 1953. The recording was released by MGM as catalog number 11470. The song was only on the Billboard magazine charts for one week, reaching #18 on May 9, 1953. The flip side was "Is It Any Wonder?"
