= Sinfonia of London =

English symphony orchestra

- Orchestra
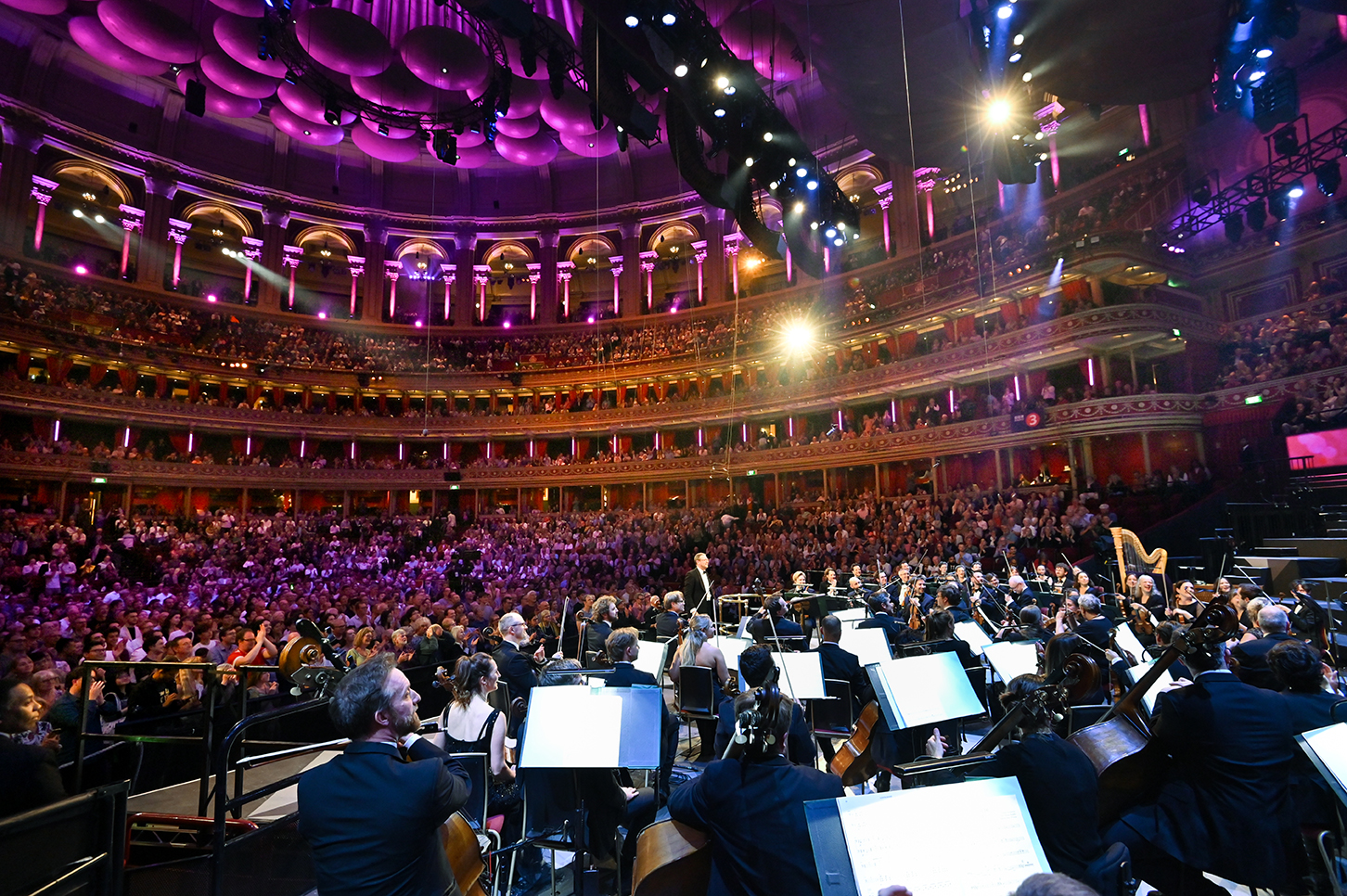
- Sinfonia of London at the BBC Proms 2023
- Founded: 1955; 70 years ago; re-established 2018; 7 years ago
- Location: London
- Principal conductor: John Wilson
- Music director: John Wilson
- Website: Official Website

Sinfonia of London is a symphony orchestra based in London, England, conducted by John Wilson.

The present orchestra, re-established by Wilson in 2018, is the third of three distinct ensembles to bear this name. Building on Sinfonia of London's significance historically as a recording orchestra, the present ensemble released 17 albums within the first five years of its re-establishment, many of which were recipients of industry awards.

In 2021, the orchestra made its live debut at the BBC Proms, and has returned every year since, as well as performing live tours across the United Kingdom.

In its current incarnation, Sinfonia of London consists of top-tier musicians, including principals and leaders from various UK and international orchestras, distinguished soloists, and members of notable chamber groups. This has led to the ensemble being frequently described as a “supergroup” or “super-orchestra” by UK classical music journalists.

== Previous orchestras ==
=== First Sinfonia of London (1955-1970) ===
The original Sinfonia of London was founded in 1955 by Gordon Walker specifically for the recording of film music. The orchestra came into being when there was a split in the future direction of the London Symphony Orchestra, many LSO players leaving to join the Sinfonia of London in order to undertake the more lucrative film soundtrack work. The orchestra appeared in the musical credits of many British and American films of the 1950s and 1960s, including the 1958 soundtrack for the Alfred Hitchcock thriller Vertigo with Bernard Herrmann's score conducted by Muir Mathieson for Mercury Records and, in 1961, the soundtrack of the horror film Gorgo.

Among the original ensemble's most celebrated commercial classical recordings are the first recording made by Colin Davis, comprising Mozart's Symphonies 29 and 39 and issued by World Record Club (TZ 130) along with its 1963 recordings with Sir John Barbirolli conducting the Serenade for Strings of Edward Elgar and the Fantasia on a Theme of Thomas Tallis of Ralph Vaughan Williams for EMI Classics. Hans Swarowsky conducted the ensemble in a World Record Club LP (WRC T 11) of Beethoven's 5th Symphony and Egmont Overture.

The original orchestra ceased to perform at the end of the 1960s. Its final recording was Classical Heads (CAS 1008) with The Ambrosian Singers, released in 1970.

=== Second Sinfonia of London (1982-1999) ===
In 1982 the title Sinfonia of London was bought by Peter Willison and Howard Blake from the Walker family for the purpose of having a named orchestra for the first recording of The Snowman. Under Willison's management, the orchestra went on to record the soundtracks to over 300 films, including Batman, The Mummy Returns, Lara Croft: Tomb Raider - The Cradle of Life, Lost in Space, The Lawnmower Man, Stargate, Tombstone, RoboCop and Young Sherlock Holmes.

In February 1998, Bruce Broughton was named the orchestra's second musical director after Blake. Releases under Broughton's leadership included recordings of soundtracks for The Young and the Restless and Heart of Darkness.

== Present orchestra ==
Sinfonia of London was reformed in 2018 by the conductor John Wilson. When it was re-established, the orchestra entered into a longstanding partnership with the British record label Chandos, with a view to undertaking a series of recording projects. Within five years of its re-establishment, the orchestra had released 17 albums with the label. Most significant among these were the world premiere recording of the complete original score of the musical Oklahoma!, with the show's original orchestration reconstructed by Bruce Pomahac, and the premiere recording of Wilson's performing edition of Ravel's ballet Daphnis et Chloé, both released in 2023.

In September 2021 the orchestra made its live performance debut at the BBC Proms, and has appeared at the festival every year since. In November 2022, the orchestra embarked on its first UK tour, performing at Symphony Hall, Birmingham, St David's Hall, Cardiff, The Anvil, Basingstoke, and Royal Concert Hall, Nottingham with pianist Martin James Bartlett, as well as making its Barbican Centre debut with a performance including Ravel's Shéhérazade, featuring soloist Alice Coote.

In July 2023, the orchestra made its debut at the 74th Aldeburgh Festival in two concerts, which was followed by its second UK tour in November of that year, Hollywood's Greatest Hits, a programme of works from The Golden Age of Hollywood, to nine venues across England and Scotland.

== Recordings ==
The following list features all recordings made by the present Sinfonia of London (re-established in 2018). All recordings are conducted by John Wilson.

Album	Other performers (if any)	Awards	Result	Label	Label Code	Release year
Korngold: Symphony in F sharp/Straussiana/Theme & Variations		Gramophone Classical Music Awards 2020	Nominated	Chandos Records	CHAN5220	2019
Korngold: Symphony in F sharp/Straussiana/Theme & Variations		BBC Music Magazine Awards 2020	Won	Chandos Records	CHAN5220	2019
Escales: French Orchestral Works				Chandos Records	CHAN5252	2020
Respighi: Roman Trilogy		Gramophone Classical Music Awards 2021	Nominated	Chandos Records	CHAN5261	2020
Respighi: Roman Trilogy		BBC Music Magazine Awards 2021	Won	Chandos Records	CHAN5261	2020
Respighi: Roman Trilogy		International Classical Music Awards 2021	Nominated	Chandos Records	CHAN5261	2020
Britten: The Turn Of The Screw (Film)	Robert Murray (Prologue), Rhian Lois (Governess), Leo Jemison (Miles), Alys Mererid Roberts (Flora), Gweneth Ann Rand (Mrs. Grose), Francesca Chiejina (Miss Jessell)	The Critics' Circle Award: Outstanding Achievement, Streaming and Digital	Won	Chandos Records	CHDVD 5290	2021
English Music for Strings		Gramophone Classical Music Awards 2021	Nominated	Chandos Records	CHAN 5264	2021
Dutilleux: Le Loup		BBC Music Magazine Awards 2022	Won	Chandos Records	CHAN 5263	2021
Ravel: Orchestral Works		Gramophone Classical Music Awards 2022	Won	Chandos Records	CHAN 5280	2022
Metamorphosen: Korngold/Schreker/ Strauss: Orchestral Works		Gramophone Classical Music Awards 2022	Nominated	Chandos Records	CHAN 5292	2022
John Ireland: Orchestral Works			Nominated	Chandos Records	CHAN 5293	2022
Hollywood Soundstage				Chandos Records	CHAN 5294	2022
Rachmaninoff: Symphony No.3		Gramophone Classical Music Awards 2023	Nominated	Chandos Records	CHAN 5297	2022
Music for Strings: Vaughan Williams, Howells, Delius, Elgar		Gramophone Classical Music Awards 2023	Nominated	Chandos Records	CHSA 5291	2023
Music for Strings: Vaughan Williams, Howells, Delius, Elgar		Grammy Awards 2024 - Producer of the Year, Classical: Brian Pidgeon	Nominated	Chandos Records	CHSA 5291	2023
Music for Strings: Vaughan Williams, Howells, Delius, Elgar		BBC Music Magazine Awards 2024	Won	Chandos Records	CHSA 5291	2023
Rachmaninoff – Symphony No.2				Chandos Records	CHAN 5309	2023
Fuchs: Orchestral Works, Vol.1		Grammy Awards 2024 - Producer of the Year, Classical: Brian Pidgeon	Nominated	Chandos Records	CHAN 5296	2023
Oklahoma!	Nathaniel Hackmann (Curly), Sierra Boggess (Laurey), Rodney Earl Clarke (Jud Fry), Jamie Parker (Will Parker), Louise Dearman (Ado Annie), Sandra Marvin (Aunt Eller), Nadim Naaman (Ali Hakim), Oklahoma! Ensemble	BBC Music Magazine Awards 2024	Won	Chandos Records	CHAN 5322	2023
Ravel: Daphnis Et Chloé	Adam Walker (solo flute), Sinfonia of London Chorus			Chandos Records	CHAN 5327	2023
Lerner and Loewe: My Fair Lady	Scarlett Strallen, Jamie Parker, Malcolm Sinclair, Alun Armstrong, Laurence Kilsby, Penelope Wilton, Julia McKenzie			Chandos Records	CHSA 5358(2)	2025
