= Gary Williams (singer) =

British jazz singer and writer

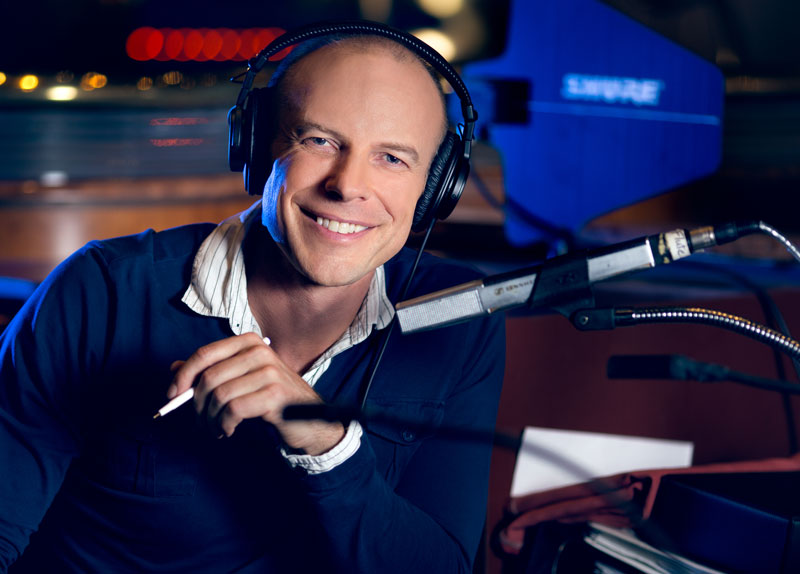

Background information
- Born: 15 December 1970 (age 55); U.K.
- Genres: Jazz, easy listening
- Occupations: Singer, broadcaster, photographer
- Website: visit.garywilliams.co.uk

Gary Williams (born 15 December 1970) is a British jazz singer, writer, broadcaster and photographer.

== Biography ==
Williams was born and raised in Grimsby, Lincolnshire, England.

Williams started his music career the BBC Big Band on BBC Radio Humberside and later developed a second career as a photographer.

== Career ==
=== Music career ===
He appeared on BBC Radio 2's Big Band Special, BBC television's Pebble Mill at One with David Jacobs, and Gloria Hunniford's Open House with Burt Bacharach. He played the role of Frank Sinatra for the West End show The Rat Pack

He also performed at Buckingham Palace for King Charles III.

In 2006 he performed in BBC1's 'Doctor Who – A Celebration' concert with David Tennant and the BBC National Orchestra of Wales with the BBC National Chorus of Wales conducted by Ben Foster.

In 2007 he recorded two songs for the soundtrack of the Warner Bros' motion picture Mrs Ratcliffe's Revolution.

He regularly performs in cabaret at Ronnie Scott's Jazz Club, The Crazy Coqs, The Pheasantry, privately for theatre producer Cameron Mackintosh and with the Syd Lawrence Orchestra. He is a regular soloist in the concert hall with the CBSO, RSNO, Halle Orchestra, RLPO, BBC Concert Orchestra (for Friday Night Is Music Night), Lahti Symphony Orchestra, Northern Sinfonia, the Melbourne Symphony Orchestra, the Adelaide Symphony Orchestra for the Adelaide Cabaret Festival and the RTÉ Concert Orchestra.

His most popular show is the interactive Sinatra Jukebox where, "instead of an hour of songs and anecdote, halfway through members of the audience were invited to fill in request forms". Reviewing the show, Cabaret Scenes said, "I can think of no other singer to better pay homage to Ol' Blue Eyes on his 100th birthday." In 2014 he performed on BBC Radio 2 with the BBC Concert Orchestra for David Jacobs – A Celebration alongside Michael Ball, Joe Stilgoe, Liz Robertson, and Marti Webb. In 2015 he made his debut at Bestival and the following year at Camp Bestival.

Williams's Christmas show A Swingin' Christmas was given a five star review by the London Evening Standard and described as "The jolliest sleigh-ride in town!". The same show was given four stars by The Times, which on the same night gave Michael Bublé's show at the O2 three stars. A big band version of the show was aired on Sky Arts on 18 December 2022 with the LP Swing Orchestra and Mica Paris.

In 2017, The Sunday Times profiled Williams, describing him as "one of the country's best-loved crooners".

In 2022 he made his New York debut at Carnegie Hall as part of a tribute concert to Peggy Lee, staged by the Mabel Mercer Foundation.

=== Recording career ===
In 2004, Williams recorded Alone Together with the John Wilson Orchestra at Abbey Road Studios. He later returned to Abbey Road to record In the Lounge with Gary Williams and Swingin' on Broadway, both with his own band. Selections from these albums were compiled in Gary Williams – The Best of Abbey Road (2010). Also in 2010, he released Gary Williams Meets Frank Sinatra, recorded with Chris Dean and His Orchestra, which was named "album of the week" by Jazz FM.

In 2011, Williams issued Let There Be Love – A Celebration of Nat King Cole with the James Pearson Trio, a live 2003 recording rediscovered in 2010. Gary Williams Live in Brazil followed in 2013. In 2015, after a crowdfunding campaign, he released the big band Christmas album Big Band Wonderland. His 2017 album Gary Williams at the Movies featured film songs and received a four-star review from the London Evening Standard. In 2018, Williams released Treasure Seeker, his first album as a singer-songwriter.

=== Broadcaster ===
Williams has presented the weekly musical biography programme The Legends of Las Vegas for The Wireless by Age UK and hosted the podcast In Conversation Radio, which featured guests including Ava Astaire MacKenzie, Christopher Biggins, and Jeffrey Archer.

He has contributed to BBC Radio 4 programmes including Excess Baggage and You and Yours. His other broadcasting work includes a special on the centenary of Frank Sinatra for BBC Radio Humberside, contributions to Don Black's Cabaret Nights on BBC Radio 2, Christmas specials for BBC Radio Humberside in 2016 and 2017, and The Art of the Crooner for BBC Radio 2 50s.

=== Writing ===
Williams' book Cabaret Secrets: How to create your own show, travel the world and get paid to do what you love has been featured in Time Out London, described as "an ideal vade mecum for anybody who wants to succeed in cabaret".

=== Photography career ===
His photographic work has been included in the Picturing High Streets national collection within the Historic England Archive for English Heritage, exhibited at the Decode Gallery, Trieste Photo Festival, published in The New York Times (singer Melissa Errico), ArtDoc Photography Magazine (singer Barb Jungr), printed on the Nicky Haslam "Common Tea Towel" and has had five images officially selected for the International Photography Awards.

In 2024 Williams published "The Little Book of Camden Passage" a photo book celebrating the people of a small London street. The book was accompanied by a solo exhibition supported by NatWest and the Angel Islington Business Improvement District (BID).

== Discography ==
- 2004: Alone Together
- 2006: In the Lounge with Gary Williams
- 2008: Swingin' on Broadway
- 2010: Gary Williams Meets Frank Sinatra
- 2011: Let There Be Love
- 2013: Live in Brazil
- 2015: Big Band Wonderland
- 2017: At the Movies
- 2018: Treasure Seeker
- 2019: Legends
- 2020: Wild About Wilder
- 2020: 95
- 2020: On Days Like These
- 2020: I'm Coming Home for Christmas (single)
- 2021: Heroes and Villains (EP)
- 2021: Stage and Screen (EP)
- 2021: I'm Coming Home for Christmas (EP)
