= John Wilson (conductor) =

British conductor, arranger, and musicologist

John Wilson (born 1972) is an English conductor and arranger, who conducts orchestras and operas, as well as big band jazz. He is the artistic director of Sinfonia of London.

== Education ==
Wilson was born in Gateshead, Tyne & Wear. He attended Breckenbeds Junior High School in Low Fell, then Heathfield Senior High School in Gateshead (now closed). In the late 1980s he studied music at A-level at Newcastle College, where he conducted a variety of ensembles including a 96-piece orchestra and choir for a concert version of West Side Story. He wrote and directed his own pantomime during this period and conducted for many local amateur dramatic societies. Later he attended the Royal College of Music, first as a percussionist, and later studying composition and conducting. During this time he won the institution's Tagore Gold Medal for outstanding academic excellence.

== Career as a conductor ==
In 2004 Wilson was appointed the music director for the Hollywood feature film Beyond the Sea, a biopic of the life of Bobby Darin starring Kevin Spacey. In 2007 he conducted the BBC Concert Orchestra in a BBC Proms concert of British film music, followed in 2009 by conducting his own John Wilson Orchestra in their Proms debut, a celebration of MGM Musicals, and made a further appearance in the 2010 Proms celebrating Rodgers & Hammerstein. He made a further Proms appearance in the 2011 season, entitled "Hooray for Hollywood", featuring his orchestra with the Maida Vale Singers and soloists. In 2012 he and his orchestra gave another two performances at the BBC Proms. The first was a complete reconstruction of My Fair Lady which was broadcast on radio, the second was a tribute to the composers and arrangers of "The Broadway Sound" shown on BBC Two. The John Wilson Orchestra appeared in every Proms season from 2009 to 2019, with a semi-staged version of Rodgers & Hammerstein's Oklahoma! being the 2017 Prom.

In recent years, Wilson has focused on conducting orchestras and operas, beginning the latter with a series of performances of Ruddigore for Opera North in early 2010. He has conducted the London Symphony Orchestra, notably for the UK premiere of Mark-Anthony Turnage's Håkan, a concerto for trumpet and orchestra. He has also conducted the Philharmonia Orchestra, the Royal Liverpool Philharmonic Orchestra, the Swedish Radio Symphony Orchestra, the Glyndebourne Touring Opera, Sydney Symphony Orchestra, CBSO, and regularly conducts BBC Philharmonic Orchestra. In July 2017, he made his debut with the Royal Concertgebouw Orchestra in Amsterdam, performing a programme of works by Leonard Bernstein and appeared at the Proms conducting the BBCSSO in his role of Associate Guest Conductor.

He held the position of Principal Conductor of the RTÉ Concert Orchestra from 1 January 2014, until December 2016. Wilson took up the position of Associate Guest Conductor of the BBC Scottish Symphony Orchestra in September 2016.

Wilson has made numerous recordings, both with his own orchestra and as guest conductor, including an ongoing series of discs of music by Aaron Copland, with the BBC Philharmonic, for Chandos Records.

In 2018, John Wilson reformed the Sinfonia of London to undertake a series of recordings, beginning with a recording of Korngold's Symphony in F Sharp for Chandos Records.

He is a patron of The British Art Music Series along with James MacMillan and Libby Purves.

In 2025, Wilson was engaged by Seth McFarlane to conduct some previously unrecorded arrangements from the archives of Frank Sinatra. Working with producer and composer, Joel McNeely, Wilson conducted arrangements by Billy May, Don Costa and Nelson Riddle.

== Arranger and orchestrator ==
Wilson is also an arranger and orchestrator and has produced a number of orchestrations for film, radio and television. In 2000 he orchestrated Sir Richard Rodney Bennett's incidental music for a BBC production of Gormenghast. This scoring won the Ivor Novello Award for Best Film Score. Wilson orchestrated and conducted Howard Goodall's score for the 2002 BBC film The Gathering Storm about the life of Winston Churchill.

Wilson's interest in historical film scores has led to his restoring a number of classic film scores and he is currently reconstructing the orchestrations of all the major MGM musicals, especially those by Conrad Salinger. Many of the original film scores were destroyed by MGM in 1969, and left only the short scores or piano scores, which Wilson used as a guide when reconstructing. He described in an interview that "transcribing music from the soundtrack is an incredibly laborious process and sometimes it's very, very slow going. The cyclone sequence from The Wizard of Oz took forever. I remember spending a whole Sunday doing three or four seconds' worth of music, so complex is that scene, with notes flying all over the page!"

== Discography ==
- BBC Concert Orchestra: Eric Coates, Under The Stars (17 Orchestral Miniatures), ASV Digital 1997
- BBC Concert Orchestra: Eric Coates, The Enchanted Garden (10 Orchestral Pieces), ASV Digital 1998
- Royal Ballet Sinfonia: The Land of the Mountain and the Flood: Scottish Orchestral Music, ASV Digital 1999
- John Wilson Orchestra: Orchestral Jazz, featuring Richard Rodney Bennett, Vocalion 2000
- John Wilson Orchestra: Soft Lights & Sweet Music: Classic Angela Morley Arrangements, Vocalion 2001
- John Wilson Orchestra: Shall We Dance? The Big Band Arrangements of Geraldo, Vocalion 2002
- John Wilson Orchestra: Moonlight Becomes You: The Classic Arrangements of Paul Weston, Vocalion 2003
- John Wilson Orchestra: Beyond The Sea – Original Motion Picture Soundtrack, Rhino Entertainment Company, 2004
- John Wilson Orchestra, Gary Williams: Alone Together, Vocalion 2004
- John Wilson Orchestra: The Film and Television Music of Angela Morley, Vocalion 2004
- John Wilson Orchestra, Lance Ellington: Lessons in Love, Vocalion 2005
- BBC Concert Orchestra: Edward German, Symphony No 1, et al., Dutton Epoch 2005
- John Wilson Orchestra: Dance Date, Vocalion 2005
- BBC Concert Orchestra: Anthony Collins, Vanity Fair, Dutton Epoch 2006
- BBC Concert Orchestra: Robert Farnon, Captain Horatio Hornblower RN Suite, et al., Dutton Epoch 2006
- BBC Concert Orchestra: Edward German, Symphony No 2, Dutton Epoch 2007
- Royal Liverpool Philharmonic Orchestra: Eric Coates, London Again, Avie Records 2008
- BBC Concert Orchestra: Eric Coates, Sound & Vision (w/ Sir Thomas Allen, Richard Edgar-Wilson), Dutton Epoch 2008
- Hallé Orchestra: John Ireland, The Overlanders Suite et al., Hallé Concerts Society 2009
- BBC Concert Orchestra: John Ireland, Orchestral Songs & Miniatures (w/ Roderick Williams), Dutton Epoch 2010
- BBC Concert Orchestra: Ralph Vaughan Williams, Heroic Elegy & Triumphal Epilogue; Alwyn, Bowen & Parry, Dutton Epoch 2010
- Royal Liverpool Philharmonic Orchestra: Made in Britain, Avie Records 2011
- Royal Liverpool Philharmonic Orchestra: John Ireland, Piano Concerto: Legend, First Rhapsody et al., Naxos 2011
- BBC Concert Orchestra: Edward German, Coronation March & Hymn et al., Dutton Epoch 2011
- John Wilson Orchestra: That's Entertainment: A Celebration of the MGM Film Musical, EMI Classics 2011
- BBC Concert Orchestra: Elgar, The Longed for Light (Elgar's Music in Wartime), Somm 2012
- John Wilson Orchestra: Rodgers & Hammerstein At The Movies, EMI Classics 2012
- John Wilson Orchestra: At The Movies: The Bonus Tracks, Warner Classics 2013
- John Wilson Orchestra: Track on Re-Joyce, The Best of Joyce DiDonato (Rodgers, You'll Never Walk Alone), Erato 2013
- John Wilson Orchestra: Track on Classical 2013 (Richard Rodgers, The King & I Overture), Erato 2013
- John Wilson Orchestra: Cole Porter in Hollywood, Warner Classics 2014
- Philharmonia Orchestra: Elgar, The Spirit of England w/ Judith Howarth, Simon Callow, Somm 2014
- John Wilson Orchestra: Gershwin in Hollywood: Live at the Royal Albert Hall, Warner Classics 2016
- BBC Philharmonic Orchestra: Copland, Orchestral Works Vol 1 – Ballet, Chandos 2016
- BBC Philharmonic Orchestra: Copland, Orchestral Works Vol 2 – Symphonies, Chandos 2016
- Ensemble: Walton, Façade (Carole Boyd, Zeb Soames), Orchid Classics 2017
- BBC Scottish Symphony Orchestra: Tracks on Siècle – Leonard Elschenbroich (Debussy, Dutilleux), Onyx 2017
- BBC Scottish Symphony Orchestra: Sir Richard Rodney Bennett: Orchestra Works, Vol 1, Chandos 2017
- BBC Philharmonic Orchestra: Copland, Orchestra Works Vol 3 - Symphonies, Chandos 2018
- Sinfonia of London: Korngold, Works for Orchestra - Symphonies, Chandos 2019
- Sinfonia of London: Escales, French Orchestral Works - Symphonies, Chandos 2020
- Sinfonia of London: Respighi : Roman Tone Poems, Chandos 2020
- Sinfonia of London: English Music for Strings (Britten, Bliss, Bridge, Berkeley) Chandos 2021
- Sinfonia of London: Dutilleux: Le Loup, Sonatine pour flute, Sonate pour hautbois, Sarabande et Cortege. Chandos 2021
- Sinfonia of London: Ravel, Ma Mere l'oye, Bolero, Alborada del Gracioso, Pavane, Valses nobles et sentimentales, La Valse, Chandos 2022
- Sinfonia of London: Strauss, Korngold & Schreker: Music for Strings, Chandos 2022
- Sinfonia of London: John Ireland: Orchestral Music, Chandos 2022
- Sinfonia of London: Hollywood Soundstage, Chandos 2022
