= In Tune Monthly =

American music magazine

In Tune Monthly is an American magazine that seeks to enrich the band, orchestra, choral and general music curriculum. It is written for middle and high school music students, for whom it is typically purchased by music educators. It is also sold in some musical instrument and equipment stores and can be purchased online.

Music educators who teach middle and high school, and are members of the National Association for Music Education, receive subscriptions to In Tune’s teacher edition as a benefit of membership. The teacher edition of the magazine includes a teacher’s guide that contains supplementary information and assessment materials relating to stories in the student edition. Lesson plans based on specific articles in the student edition are also available on the magazine's website for subscribers.

The magazine’s website additionally provides text, video, and audio content that supports, but does not duplicate, the stories in each printed issue. The site’s regular features include a monthly podcast called the In Tune Listening List, which provides commentary on recommended songs in a variety of musical genres, and a collection of daily news for music students. The website is updated for each issue of the print magazine, which is published eight months a year, with issues dated from October through May.

== History ==
In Tune was founded in 2003 by veteran Billboard, Forbes and Business Week publishing executive Irwin Kornfeld, former Musician, EQ and Gig magazines publisher Angelo Biasi, and GRAMMY-winning music producer Will Edwards. The founding editor was industry veteran Rich Maloof (Guitar for the Practicing Musician). Following the publication of the magazine's premiere issue, author and composer Emile Menasché took over as editor, remaining in that position until 2016. The magazine's current editor-in-chief is Mac Randall.

The first issue of In Tune featured Norah Jones on the cover, a story on overcoming stage fright, a glossary of musical terms, a breaking story on then newcomer Joss Stone, an explanation of how a microphone works, and a photo essay about Yo-Yo Ma’s cello. This mix of stories set the template for the magazine, which regularly offers coverage of all styles of music.

== Magazine Content ==
Today, a typical issue of In Tune includes:

• A contemporary artist-focused cover feature (2016 and 2017 cover subjects have included Alabama Shakes, Ed Sheeran, Twenty One Pilots, Shawn Mendes, Andra Day, Fitz and the Tantrums and Alison Krauss.)

• A feature about musical technique and/or theory, illustrated with music notation.

• An analysis of a classic or current popular song, with chord charts and suggestions on how to play the song in an ensemble setting.

• A feature about a musical instrument or technology (for example, the history of reed instruments; the anatomy of a violin; the making of a drum head; the basics of recording).

• Special reports, such as “how to choose a music college,” “how to start a music festival,” “the principles of sound reinforcement,” and “how to choose a summer music program.”

• A profile of a legendary musician or group (subjects have ranged from Duke Ellington to Luciano Pavarotti to Led Zeppelin).

• An exploration of a contemporary artist’s musical influences.

• A profile of a composer or songwriter (subjects have ranged from John Williams to Johntá Austin to Linda Perry).

• A profile of a working musician, such as the trumpeter for Big Bad Voodoo Daddy, the trombonist for The Mighty Mighty Bosstones, and the music director for The Lion King.

• A profile of a person working behind the scenes in the music business, such as record producers, arrangers, A&R people, music lawyers, etc.

• Examinations of music genres, such as jazz, bluegrass, and classical music.

In Tune also holds an annual essay contest for teachers called the Music Room Makeover, in which sponsors donate equipment to one school.[6]

== Additional projects ==
In addition to In Tune, the magazine’s parent company, In Tune Partners, publishes Music Alive! magazine, Drum Corps International Magazine for DCI, Teaching Music magazine for The National Association for Music Education, and WGI Focus for Winter Guard International. In Tune Partners also represents NAfME’s Music Educator’s Journal, its weekly newsletter, and nafme.org for advertising sales.

Its sister company, Westchester Media, publishes ASCAP's Playback magazine and helps produce the ASCAP “I Create Music” Expo.
