= Gay Nineties =

American term referring to the decade of the 1890s

The Gay Nineties is an American nostalgic term and a periodization of the history of the United States, referring to the decade of the 1890s. Despite the term, part of the decade was marked by a financial crisis, which worsened greatly when the Panic of 1893 set off a widespread economic depression in the United States that lasted until 1897.

In the United Kingdom the period is known as the Naughty Nineties, and refers to the decade of supposedly decadent art of Aubrey Beardsley, the witty plays and trial of Oscar Wilde, society scandals, and the beginning of the suffragette movement.

== Etymology ==
The term Gay Nineties began to be used in the 1920s in the United States, and it is believed to have been created by the artist Richard V. Culter, who first released a series of drawings in Life magazine titled "the Gay Nineties" and later published a book of drawings with the same name.

"Naughty Nineties" is one of a group of alliterative decade names that also includes "Sentimental Seventies" and "Elegant Eighties" for the 1870s and 1880s respectively.

== History ==
Novels by authors like Edith Wharton and Booth Tarkington documented the high life of the "old money" families. By the 1920s, the decade was nostalgically seen as a period of pre-income tax wealth for a newly emergent "society set". The railroads, the agricultural depression of the Southern United States, and the dominance of the United States in South American markets and the Caribbean meant that industrialists of the Northern United States seemed to have been doing very well.

The Gay Nineties Revue was a nostalgic radio program in the 1930s, hosted by a prominent composer of popular songs of the 1890s, Joe Howard. The television series The Gay Nineties Revue was broadcast in the 1940s.

There was an 1890s-themed New York café, Bill's Gay Nineties, during the 1930s. Billy Rose's Diamond Horseshoe was an 1890s-themed establishment and the subject of the film Diamond Horseshoe (1945). There is also a popular pizza restaurant in Pleasanton, California, with the name "Gay Nineties Pizza Co."

From the 1920s to the 1960s, filmmakers had a nostalgic interest in the 1890s as seen in the films She Done Him Wrong (1933), Belle of the Nineties (1934), The Strawberry Blonde (1941), The Nifty Nineties (a Mickey Mouse cartoon) (1941), My Gal Sal (1942), Heaven Can Wait (1943), The Naughty Nineties (1945), I Wonder Who's Kissing Her Now (1947), By the Light of the Silvery Moon (1953) and Hello, Dolly! (1969).

Roger Edens' song "The Gay Nineties" opens a production number spoofing period melodramas in Strike Up the Band, a 1940 MGM film starring Judy Garland and Mickey Rooney.

There were 1890s nostalgia albums.

"Nineties Nostalgia" for the "Gay Nineties" or 1890s was a form of decade nostalgia, and existed by the 1920s and 1930s. 1890s nostalgia was part of the broader phenomenon of Neo-Victorian nostalgia.

In Japan, 1890s nostalgia was part of the broader phenomenon of Meiji nostalgia.

== See also ==
- Belle Époque
- Gilded Age
- Victorian era
