= What's the Use of Dreaming? =

Song

Single by Joe Howard, Floradora Girls and the Elm City Four
- B-side: "Hello Ma Baby"
- Released: 1946
- Genre: Traditional Pop
- Length: 2:47
- Label: DeLuxe
- Songwriter(s): Joe Howard

"What's the Use of Dreaming?" is a popular song written and sung by Joe Howard. It appeared in shows in 1906 and 1907, and was a hit song in 1938. The song was revived for the 1947 biopic I Wonder Who's Kissing Her Now.
