= The Gay Nineties Revue =

American TV variety series (1948–1949)

- Presented by: Joseph E. Howard
- Country of origin: United States

Production
- Running time: 30 minutes

Original release
- Network: ABC
- Release: August 11, 1948 – 1949

The Gay Nineties Revue is an American variety series that aired live on ABC Television from August 11, 1948, to January 14, 1949. The host was 81-year-old songwriter and vaudeville veteran Joe Howard.

== Overview ==
The Gay Nineties Revue brought live performances of entertainment that had originally been written and performed decades earlier. It was an adaptation of a program of the same name that was on radio from 1939 to 1944, before it was revived for television. Regular performers were singers Lulu Bates and The Florodora Girls. Ray Bloch and his orchestra provided accompaniment.

The theme song was "I Wonder Who's Kissing Her Now", which Howard claimed to have written but was actually composed by Harold Orlob.

== Production background ==
Howard was a popular songwriter and singer, who later had a successful career capitalizing on the nostalgia many had for the "Gay Nineties" (the 1890s). The program was initially broadcast on Wednesdays from 8 to 8:30 p.m. Eastern Time. In November 1948 it was moved to Fridays from 8:30 to 9 p.m. E. T.

== Preservation status ==
At least one episode of this show survives, which can be viewed online at the Internet Archive.

== See also ==
- 1948-49 United States network television schedule
