= Ronnie Gaylord =

American singer, songwriter, pantomimer and comedian

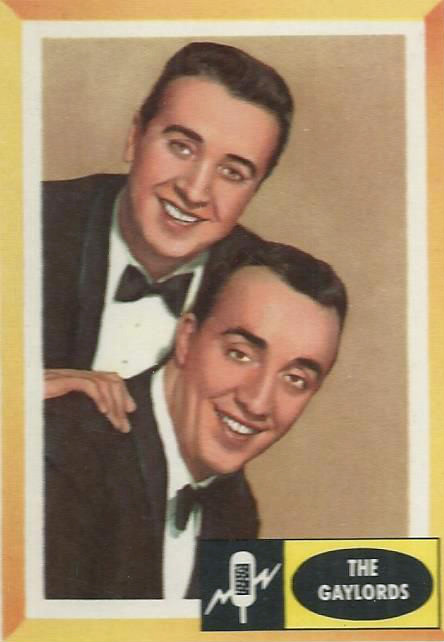
- Gaylord (top) and partner Burt Holiday (bottom) in 1960
- Born: Ronald L. Fredianelli; June 12, 1930; Detroit, Michigan, USA
- Died: January 25, 2004 (aged 73); Las Vegas, Nevada, USA
- Other name: Ronnie Vincent
- Years active: 1950s—2004
- Known for: The Gaylords; Gaylord and Holiday

Ronnie Gaylord (born Ronald L. Fredianelli; June 12, 1930, Detroit—January 25, 2004, Las Vegas) was an Italian-American musician, songwriter, pantomimer, and comedian best known as a member of the band The Gaylords and the music/comedy duo Gaylord and Holiday. Among their many hits are "Tell Me You're Mine", "From the Vine Came the Grape", and "The Little Shoemaker". He adopted the stage name Ronnie Gaylord in the 1950s after going by Ronnie Vincent for a brief period.

== Biography ==
=== Early life ===
Gaylord was born Ronald L. Fredianelli on June 12, 1930, in Detroit to Joseph and Florence (née Antico) Fredianelli. His mother died of pulmonary tuberculosis in 1932; his father remarried Frances (née Graziana) in 1937. Gaylord was Italian on both sides: his father was born in Boveglio and his mother's parents were from Naples.

Gaylord grew up in the same neighborhood as Bonaldo Bonaldi (later known as Burt Holiday), who was purportedly his cousin. They both attended the University of Detroit Mercy to study pre-law. In 1947, while still students, Bonaldi and Gaylord (then still known as Fredianelli) formed a musical group called the Gay Lords with classmate Don Rea. They performed on campus and in clubs around Detroit; a newspaper misprinted their name from the Gay Lords to the Gaylords, which they took on. Gaylord finished two years of law school before quitting to tour with the band.

=== Career ===
The first hit by the Gaylords was "Tell Me You're Mine" which hit #2 on the music charts upon its release in 1952. The record sold more than 1.2 million copies and was a gold record. This was an Italian love song, "Per un Bacio d'Amore", with English lyrics written by the band and "an upbeat chorus". Singing popular Italian songs in English, and popular English songs in Italian, continued to be a part of the Gaylords' style throughout their career.

Not long after, Gaylord was drafted into the Korean War; he finished basic at Camp Atterbury and was subsequently assigned to the Special Services. He sang with the military band, did a number of singing commercials, and continued to produce music as a solo artist for Mercury Records. His hit song "Cuddle Me" was in the Billboard Top 20 Singles between March and May 1954. He guest starred on the Army-sponsored radio show Club 31 and, in addition to "Cuddle Me", recorded "Coquette" and "Tell Me You Love Me Tonight".

He was discharged from the military in 1958 and returned to the Gaylords, where he had been temporarily replaced by Billy Christ. After a brief split between Gaylord and Holiday, they reunited and began rebuilding the band to its success before the war. The following year, Bonaldi and Gaylord moved to Nevada together to work on the lounge circuit, a gig that was quite popular at the time. In the 1960s, they began billing as both a music and comedy duo. Their sets variously included poking fun at the city (when they were traveling); taking up stereotypical Italian personas and putting them in improbable situations; and impressions of other musicians, including The Mills Brothers, Elvis Presley, and Sonny and Cher. Gaylord wrote "I'll Trade You Laughter For Love" for fellow lounge circuit performer Don Rickles, who eventually used the song as his "theme song". In 1966, they performed at Frank Sinatra's wedding to Mia Farrow. Rea, who had been an accompanying part of the Gaylords for several years, officially left the band in 1975.

In the 1960s and 1970s, Gaylord appeared on a number of variety shows while the genre was at its peak, most of the time with Holiday but at times on his own. These appearances include The Glen Campbell Goodtime Hour, The Hollywood Palace, Moving Wheels, The Johnny Carson Show, The Flip Wilson Show, Jukebox Jury, and The Ford Show. In 1965, the two were working on a pilot for their own TV show, but it never came to fruition. In 1985, they created Famiglia, described by Holiday as "an Italian Fiddler on the Roof", written by Gaylord. The film was eventually converted into a musical for stage. It follows the lives of a three-generation Italian family, starring Gaylord as the middle generation; Holiday as his father; and Gaylord's son Tony as his son. His wife Terry and son Ron Jr. also appear.

In addition to playing guitar, violin, bass, banjo, and mandolin, Gaylord was a talented songwriter who wrote a number of hits, including "Cuddle Me" (performed by Gaylord); "Oh, Am I Lonely?" (performed by Gaylord); "I'll Trade You Laughter For Love" (performed by Don Rickles); "I Will Never Pass This Way Again" (performed by Glen Campbell), and "Wondering!" (performed by The Gaylords). Gaylord continued performing until the end; his last gig was in Michigan just four months before his death in January 2004.

=== Personal life ===
Gaylord stayed in the Las Vegas/Reno area from the time he and Holiday moved there in 1959 until his death. He had two children, Ronald Jr. (1956-2022) and Melissa, with his first wife, Teena, and three, Christopher (1967-2025), Anthony, and Tiffany, with his second wife, Terry (1942-2023), who he was with for 35 years.

Four of his five children are or were in show business. Tony was the guitarist for Third Eye Blind until 2010 and previously played with heavy metal band Apocrypha and cover band Loveshack; Tiffany sang at Texas Station with Loveshack and at MGM Grand Las Vegas with Venus; Ron Jr. filled his father's role in Gaylord and Holiday; and Chris was a musician who died in April 2025 from cancer. Melissa, his eldest daughter, is a teacher.

== Later years and death ==
When not performing, Gaylord enjoyed painting, sketching, sculpting, and collecting cars.

Gaylord died on January 25, 2004, in his Las Vegas home, following an eight-year battle with cancer. He hid his diagnosis from everyone, including his wife Terry and partner Burt, for as long as he could so he could continue performing.
