= Honeymoon (Joe Howard song) =

1929 song by Joseph E. Howard

"Honeymoon" is a 1929 hit popular song written and sung by Joe Howard. His co-writers were Will Howard and Frank R. Adams. The song was revived for the 1947 biopic I Wonder Who's Kissing Her Now sung by June Haver.
