= The Time, the Place and the Girl =

The Time, the Place and the Girl may refer to:

- The Time, the Place and the Girl (1907 musical), a Broadway musical comedy, music by Joseph E. Howard
- The Time, the Place and the Girl (1929 film), a musical
- The Time, the Place and the Girl (1946 film), a musical unrelated to the musical and 1929 film
