= Four Buddies (song) =

"Four Buddies" is a World War II enlistment song. The song follows the trend of World War II songs that used heavy emotional and sentimental appeal to present army enlistment.

The lyrics depict four inseparable best friends who, upon hearing of the war, all enlist in the army. The last verse ensures that they will all survive and reunite upon returning to the United States.

== Composition ==
The song features music by Leonard Whitcup and words by Paul Cunningham. It was published in 1943 by Broadway Music Corp in New York.
