= Frank R. Adams =

American dramatist

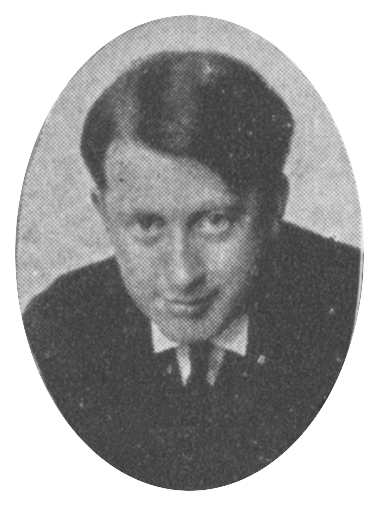
- Born: Frank Ramsay Adams; July 7, 1883; Morrison, Illinois
- Died: October 8, 1963 (aged 80); White Lake, Michigan
- Spouse: Lorna D. Margrave

Frank Ramsay Adams (July 7, 1883 – October 8, 1963) was an American author, screenwriter, composer, and newspaper reporter.

== Biography ==
He was born on July 7, 1883, in Morrison, Illinois. Educated at the University of Chicago, Adams worked as a reporter for several Chicago newspapers, including the Chicago Tribune, City Press, Chicago Daily News, and the Chicago Herald-Examiner. From 1916 to 1932, he was manager of the Nufer-Adams Playhouse (which he cofounded with lumberman J.J. Nufer and which since 1973 has been known as Howmet Playhouse) and owner of the Sylvan Beach Resort Co. in Whitehall, Michigan.

Adams wrote plays, musical comedies, and lyrics for popular songs, such as "I Wonder Who's Kissing Her Now". He composed the stage scores for the musicals "The Time, the Place, and the Girl", "The Girl Question", "A Stubborn Cinderella", "The Goddess of Liberty", and "The Price of Tonight". His chief musical collaborators included Joe Howard, Harold Orlob and Will Hough.

Adams wrote several novels, some of which were made into films. His short stories were published in several magazines, including Smart Set, Cosmopolitan, Black Cat, and Illustrated Detective. He also had a successful career as a screenwriter in Hollywood, writing the stories for such films as Stage Struck (1925), Almost a Lady (1925), and The Cowboy and the Lady (1938), which starred Gary Cooper and Merle Oberon.

On December 1, 1931, he married Lorna D. Margrave. The couple had one child. During World War II, Adams fought in France as a lieutenant in a United States Army artillery unit. Adams died October 8, 1963, at White Lake, Michigan. He was 80 years old.

== Works ==
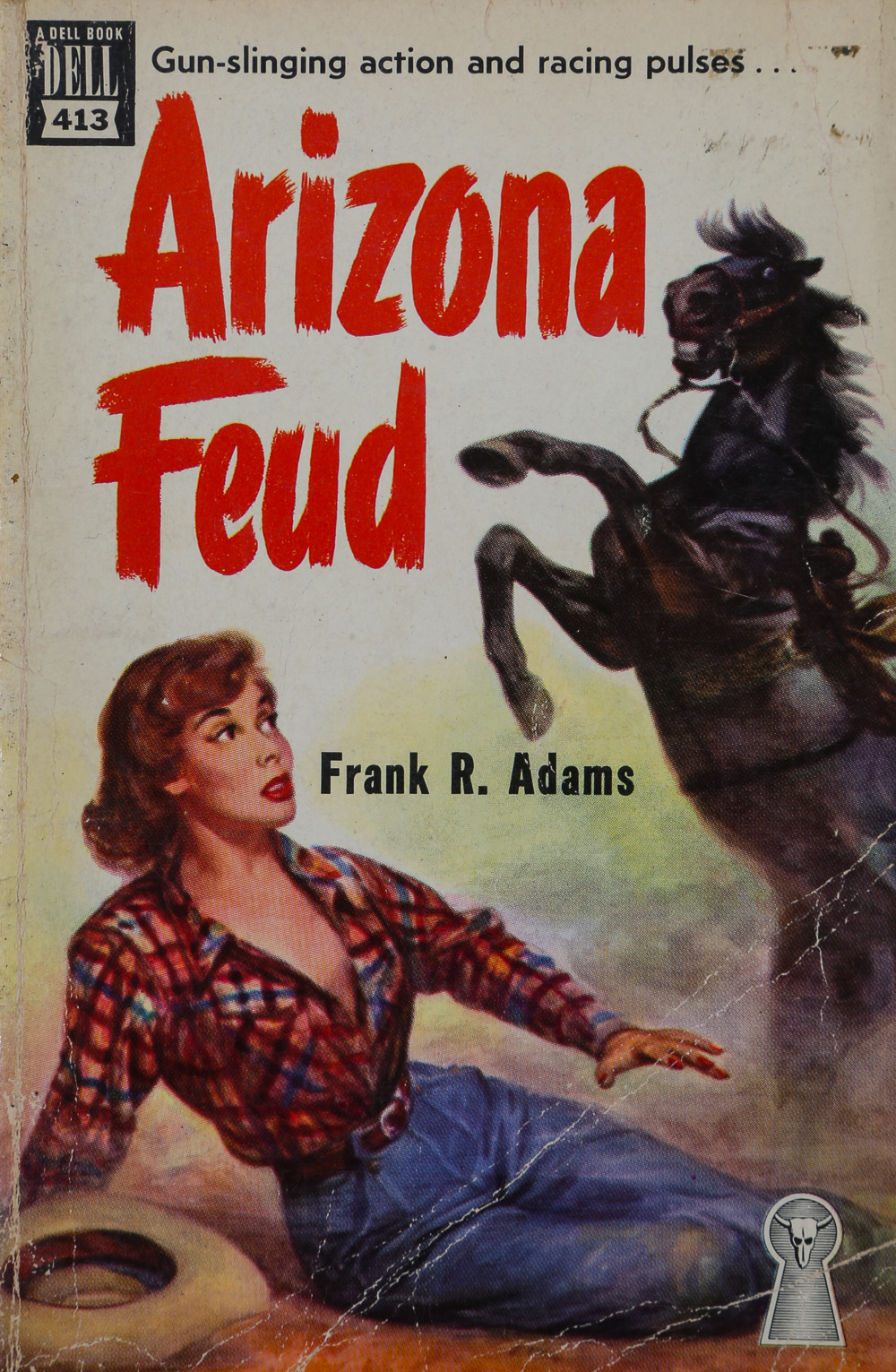
1950 Western by Frank R. Adams

=== Bibliography ===
Novels

- 3,000 Miles Away
- Arizona Feud. Garden City: Doubleday Doran, 1941.
- Five Fridays. Small, Maynall, Boston, 1915.
- For Valor
- Help Yourself to Happiness. Macaulay Co., 1929.
- King's Crew
- Molly and I. Small, Maynard & Co, 1915.
- The Secret Attic

Short stories

- "Without the net" (1922, in Cosmopolitan)
- "The heart pirate" (1922, in Cosmopolitan)
- "The come-on play" (1929, in Liberty)
- "The driveaway" (1929, in Redbook Magazine)
- "His way with her" (1929, in Redbook Magazine)
- "King's crew" (1929, in Redbook Magazine)
- "The long night" (1929, in Chicago Sunday Tribune)
- "The moon and muffins" (1929, in Redbook Magazine)
- "Peter and Mrs. Pan" (1929, in Smart Set)
- "So few days left" (1929, in Liberty)
- "The song is ended" (1929, in Chicago Sunday Tribune)
- "Women think faster" (1929, in International Cosmopolitan)

=== Filmography ===
- 1917 The Page Mystery
- 1918 My Unmarried Wife (novel "Molly and I and the Silver Ring")
- 1918 The Brass Bullet (story)
- 1918 Unexpected Places (story)
- 1919 Them Eyes (short) (story)
- 1919 The Pointing Finger (story "No Experience Required")
- 1920 Molly and I (as Frank Ramsey Adams / novel Molly and I and the Silver Ring)
- 1921 Proxies (story)
- 1921 Enchantment (as Frank Ramsey Adams / story "Manhandling Ethel")
- 1921 There Are No Villains (story)
- 1922 The Super-Sex (story)
- 1923 The Love Piker (story)
- 1923 The Near Lady (story)
- 1924 The Marriage Cheat (story)
- 1925 Scandal Street (story)
- 1925 Stage Struck (story)
- 1926 Meet the Prince (story "The American Sex")
- 1926 Almost a Lady (story "Skin Deep")
- 1926 Devil's Dice (story)
- 1928 Haunted Island (writer)
- 1929 The Time, the Place and the Girl (play)
- 1933 Peg o' My Heart (writer)
- 1934 She Made Her Bed (scenario)
- 1935 Love in Bloom (original screenplay)
- 1935 The Virginia Judge
- 1937 Outcast (story)
- 1937 Circus Girl (story "Without a Net")
- 1938 The Cowboy and the Lady (story)
- 1938 Trade Winds (writer)

=== Songs ===
- "Be Sweet to Me, Kid"
- "Blow The Smoke Away"
- "Cross Your Heart"
- "Gangway for the Sylvan Beach Gang"
- "Honeymoon"
- "I Don't Like Your Family"
- "I Wonder Who's Kissing Her Now"
- "Tonight Will Never Come Again"
- "What's the Use of Dreaming"
- "When You First Kiss the Last Girl You Love"
