= Tell Me You're Mine =

Single by The Gaylords
- B-side: "Cuban Love Song"
- Released: November 1952
- Genre: Traditional pop
- Length: 2:37
- Label: Mercury
- Songwriters: Ronald L. Fredianelli, Dico Vasin

The Gaylords singles chronology
"Tell Me You're Mine" (1952)	"Ramona" (1953)

"Tell Me You're Mine" is a song written by Ronald L. Fredianelli and Dico Vasin and performed by The Gaylords. It reached number 2 on the U.S. pop chart and number 3 on Cashbox in 1953.

The song ranked number 17 on Billboard's Year-End top 30 singles of 1953.

== Other versions ==
- Russ Morgan and His Orchestra released a version of the song as the B-side to his 1953 single "Have You Heard?"
- Vic Damone released a version of the song on his 1958 album, Angela Mia.
- Lou Monte released a version of the song on his 1959 album, Italian Houseparty.
- Jerry Vale released a version of the song on his 1962 album, I Have But One Heart.
- Gaylord and Holiday released a version of the song on their 1975 album, Second Generation.
