= Leonard Whitcup =

- Born: October 12, 1903; New York City, New York, U.S.
- Died: April 6, 1979 (aged 75); New York City, New York, U.S.
- Education: New York University
- Occupations: Publisher; composer; lyricist
- Years active: 1923–1977

Leonard Whitcup (1903 – 1979) was a publisher, composer, and lyricist. He was first vice president of the American Guild of Authors and Composers (presently known as the Songwriters Guild of America) as well as the director and treasurer of the National Academy of Popular Music. Among the variety of notable songs he had written or co-written were “Take Me Back to My Boots and Saddle” and “Frenesi”. His song "Shout Wherever You May Be, I Am An American", was cited in the Congressional Record on May 5, 1941.

“Take Me Back to My Boots and Saddle” was a song used in the soundtrack for the 1936 Gene Autry Western Boots and Saddle. It was composed by Teddy Powell, Walter G. Samuels, and Whitcup. "Frenesi" was copyrighted in 1940 by Whitcup as the English language lyrics for the song.

== Early life and career ==
Whitcup was born on October 12, 1903 in New York City, New York. He would later attend New York University. In 1923, he copyrighted the song "Rain Drops" with words by Max Rutchik. From 1934 to 1977, he wrote or co-wrote a variety of popular songs, some for cinema, television, musical revues, and vaudeville. He wrote or co-wrote the music for a variety of film soundtracks including The Forward Pass (1929) with Walter Samuels and Max Rutchik, Rollin' Plains (1938) in collaboration with Walter G. Samuels and Teddy Powell, and Sweet Moments (1939) in collaboration with Teddy Powell.

In 1947, he co-wrote "Unbelievable" with Elisse Boyd. In 1950, Whitcup and Dick Manning composed the song "I'll Follow You". Also in 1950, Whitcup and Paul Cunningham wrote "From the Vine Came the Grape". In the 1960s, Whitcup wrote music and lyrics for the films Weekend, Italian Style (1965) and the Swedish film Pippi Longstocking (1969). In 1977, Whitcup, Paul Cummingham, and Ray Madison wrote "Orange Blossoms: The Wedding Song".

Whitcup and Max Rutchik composed a variety of songs as "Mac and Lenny" which included "Nize Baby","I've Gotta Have You", and "Go Ahet".

Copyrighted Music (1923-1931)
| Title | Year | Music | Lyrics |
|---|---|---|---|
| Rain Drops | 1923 | Leonard Whitcup | Max Rutchik |
| Somebody Loses but Somebody Wins | 1924 | Leonard Whitcup | Max Rutchik |
| Try This on Your Piano | 1924 | Leonard Whitcup | Max Rutchik |
| Tired of the City | 1924 | Leonard Whitcup | Max Rutchik |
| Sea-Sick | 1928 | Leonard Whitcup | Max Rutchik |
| Tootache | 1928 | Leonard Whitcup | Max Rutchik |
| Travelin' to Dixie Land (melody) | 1928 | Leonard Whitcup | |
| You'll Do (Until He Comes Along) | 1928 | Leonard Whitcup | Max Rutchik Wes Frazer |
| Romance Mad | 1929 | Leonard Whitcup | Max Rutchik |
| Where (melody) | 1931 | Leonard Whitcup | |
