= Somewhere in France Is the Lily =

1918 song by Joe Howard and Philander Chase Johnson

"Somewhere In France Is the Lily"
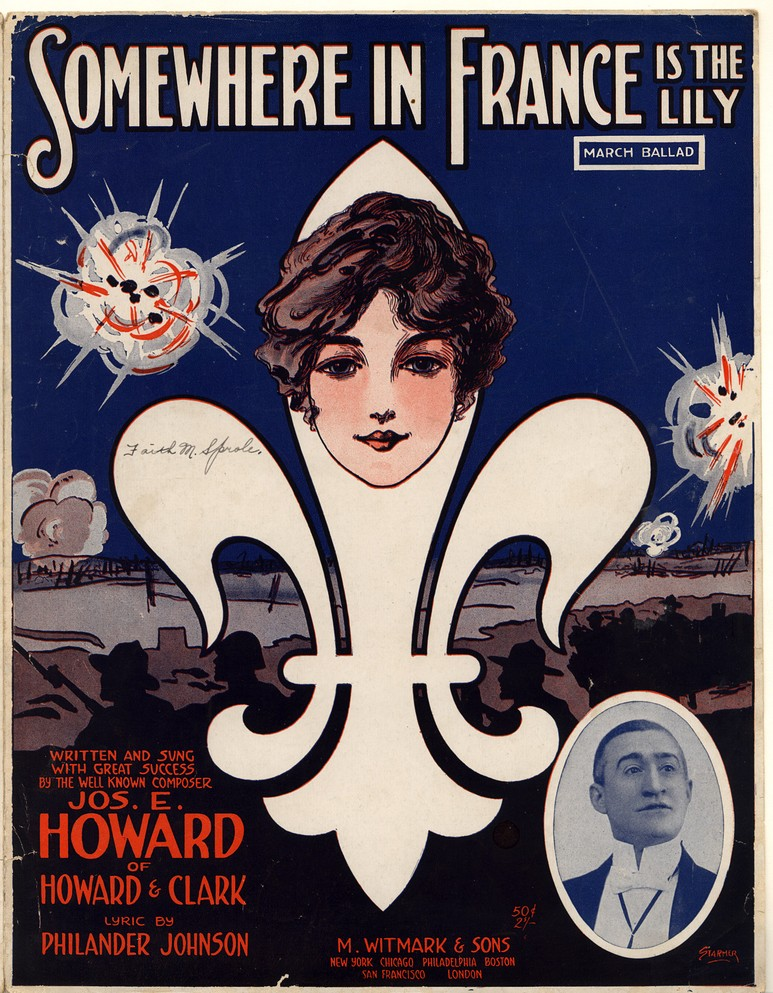
- Original cover art of "Somewhere In France is the Lily."

Song
- Released: 1918
- Songwriter(s): Composer: Joseph E. Howard; Lyricist: Philander Chase Johnson
- Producer(s): M. Witmark & Sons

"Somewhere In France Is the Lily" is a World War I march composed in 1918 by Joseph E. Howard with lyrics written by Philander Chase Johnson. It became a hit twice in 1918, charting when released by Charles Hart and by Henry Burr. The song presents a young couple separated by war but held together by love and the sentimental value of lily flowers.

The lyrics and cover art are in the public domain.

== Composition ==
The song was originally sung and composed by Joseph E. Howard, with words by Philander Johnson. It was published by M. Witmark & Sons in New York City in 1917. The song uses the imagery of the rose and the lily to represent England and France respectively, and emphasizes the cooperation and closeness of the two countries in World War I.

Cover art for the composition shows that the sheet music was priced at US$0.50, and in 1918, a phonograph of the song (coupled with "My Sweetheart is Somewhere in France" sung by Elizabeth Spencer) could be purchased through Victor Records for $0.75.

== Recordings and commercial success ==
The score went through approximately seven printings.
