= The Gaylords (American vocal group) =

American singing trio

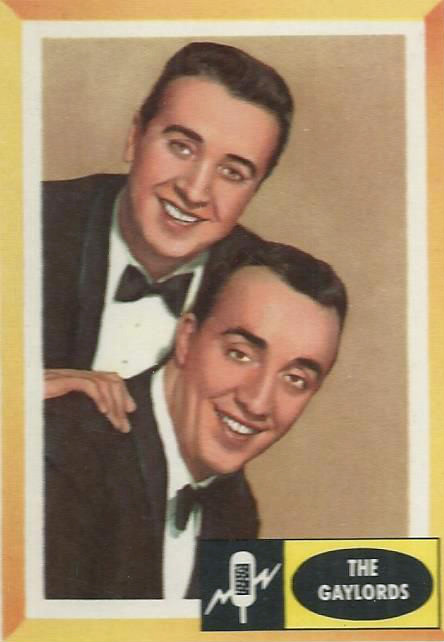
The group in 1960.

The Gaylords were an American vocal pop trio, consisting of Ronald L. Fredianelli (June 12, 1930 – January 25, 2004), Bonaldo "Burt" Bonaldi (July 6, 1926 – May 10, 2017), and Don Rea (December 9, 1928 – June 30, 2017). Fredianelli joined the U.S. Army in the 1950s, and was replaced by Bill Christ (September 10, 1930 – October 30, 2017).

== Formation ==
Fredianelli, Bonaldi and Rea were all born in Detroit, Michigan. Together they formed the Gaylords (originally The Gay Lords) in Detroit in 1949. The group's name was decided upon after a chance encounter with Marcus Wren.

== Career ==
In the 1950s the group had a number of Italian-flavored hits on the Mercury Records label, often consisting of a song partly sung in Italian and partly in English. Their most successful release was "Tell Me You're Mine", which had sold over one million copies by 1958. "Tell Me You're Mine" reached #3 on the US chart. They also recorded comedy-novelty material, like "Love I You."

Fredianelli rejoined Mercury in 1954 after his military service, and, as Ronnie Gaylord, recorded as a solo artist (charting with his hit song "Cuddle Me"). Bonaldi, Rea, and Christ continued recording as The Gaylords for Mercury until 1964. After their recording contract lapsed, Rea and Christ left the group. Fredianelli and Bonaldi continued to perform as "Gaylord and Holiday"; Bonaldi used the professional name of Burt Holiday, and adopted it legally in 1976. The team stayed together until 2003, when Fredianelli's failing health curtailed further work.

== Deaths ==
Fredianelli died on January 25, 2004, in Las Vegas, Nevada, at age 73.

Bonaldi still performed with Ron Gaylord, Jr., Ronnie Gaylord's oldest son (the other son being rock guitarist Tony Fredianelli) until his death on May 10, 2017, in Carson City, Nevada, at age 90.

Donald "Don" Rea, keyboardist for The Gaylords, died in Reno, Nevada, on June 30, 2017, after a short battle with cancer, at age 88. Bill Christ, the last surviving member of the group, died on October 30, 2017, at the age of 87.

== Hit records ==
Year	Title	Chart positions	
Year	Title	US	CB
1952	"Tell Me You're Mine"	2	3
1953	"Spinning a Web"	16	-
1953	"Ramona"	12	13
1953	"The Strings of My Heart"	21	12
1953	"Mama-Papa Polka"	-	28
1954	"From the Vine Came the Grape"	7	3
1954	"Cuddle Me"(Ronnie Gaylord, solo)	13	15
1954	"Isle of Capri"	14	9
1954	"Love I You (You I Love)"	23	41
1954	"Wow!"(Ronnie Gaylord, solo)	-	28
1954	"The Little Shoemaker"	2	2
1954	"Mecque, Mecque"	28	-
1954	"I'm No Gonna Say"(Ronnie Gaylord, solo)	-	39
1954	"Veni-Vidi-Vici"	30	25
1954	"Pupalina"	-	22
1955	"Chow Mein"	-	28
1955	"No Arms Can Ever Hold You"	67	21
1958	"Ma Ma Ma Marie"	97	43
1958	"Flamingo L'Amore"	98	59
1976	"Eh! Cumpari"(Gaylord & Holiday)	72	79
