= Philander Chase Johnson =

American journalist, poet, and lyricist

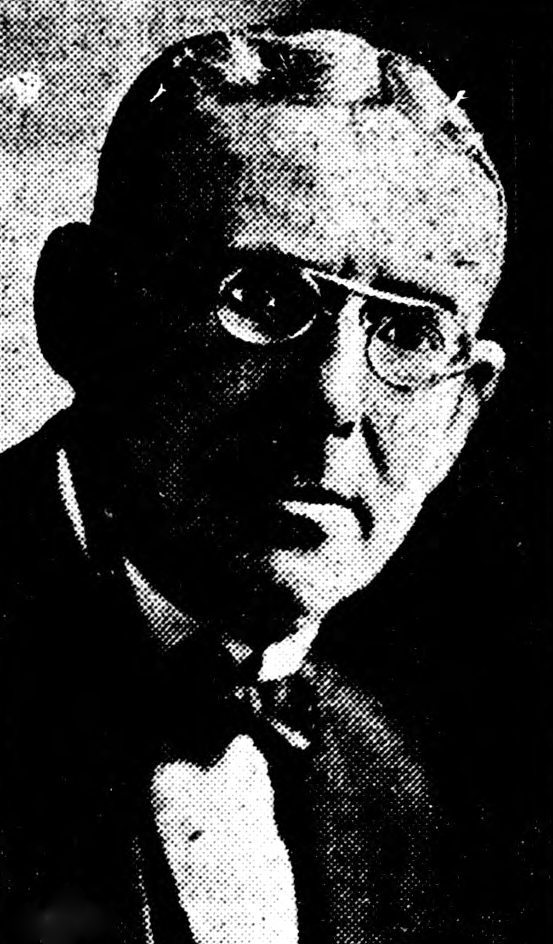
- Philander Chase Johnson c. 1922
- Born: February 6, 1866; Wheeling, West Virginia, United States
- Died: May 18, 1939 (aged 73); Washington, D.C., United States
- Resting place: Rock Creek Cemetery, Washington D.C.
- Occupations: Playwright, Humorist, Lyricist, Critic
- Spouse(s): Louise Covert Johnson (m. 1890–1906); Mary A. Hagmann (m. 1908)
- Writing career
- Period: 1866–1939

Philander Chase Johnson (1866–1939) was an American journalist, humorist, poet, lyricist, and dramatic editor. At the time of his death, he had been a Washington Evening Star staff member for 47 years. Prior to joining the Evening Star, he had been an editorial writer for The Washington Post.

== Works ==
- Sayings of Uncle Eben (1896)
- Now-A-Day Poems (1900)
- Songs Of The G. O. P. (1900)
- Senator Sorghum's primer of politics (1906)
- No use kickin' (1909)
- In the tall timber : an opera bluffe (1912)
- Somewhere In France Is the Lily (1917). L: Joseph E. Howard
- There's a Call for You and Me, Carry On (1918). m: William T. Pierson
