= The Cowboy and the Lady (1938 film) =

1938 film

- Theatrical release poster
- Directed by: H. C. Potter
- Screenplay by: S.N. Behrman; Sonya Levien
- Story by: Leo McCarey; Frank R. Adams
- Produced by: Samuel Goldwyn
- Starring: Gary Cooper; Merle Oberon
- Cinematography: Gregg Toland
- Edited by: Sherman Todd
- Music by: Alfred Newman
- Production company: Samuel Goldwyn Productions
- Distributed by: United Artists
- Release date: November 17, 1938 (USA)
- Running time: 91 minutes
- Country: United States
- Language: English
- Budget: $1,500,000 (estimated)

The Cowboy and the Lady is a 1938 American Western romantic comedy film directed by H.C. Potter, and starring Gary Cooper and Merle Oberon. Written by S.N. Behrman and Sonya Levien, based on a story by Frank R. Adams and veteran film director Leo McCarey, the film is about a beautiful socialite masquerading as a maid who becomes involved with an unpretentious, plain-spoken cowboy who is unaware of her true identity. The Cowboy and the Lady won an Academy Award for Sound Recording (Thomas T. Moulton), and was nominated for Original Score (Alfred Newman) and Original Song ("The Cowboy and the Lady" by Lionel Newman and Arthur Quenzer).

== Plot ==
Mary Smith (Merle Oberon), daughter of presidential hopeful Horace Smith (Henry Kolker), has lived a cloistered life free of any scandal. Although she supports his political aspirations, she longs for a life of her own. Believing she needs some excitement in her life, Mary's free-spirited Uncle Hannibal (Harry Davenport) takes her dancing at a nightclub, which the police raid for gambling. When Horace learns that press reporters have discovered Mary's name on the police report, he sends his daughter off to the family's Palm Beach, Florida mansion.

For Mary, Palm Beach is a place of loneliness and boredom. She asks her two housemaids (Patsy Kelly and Mabel Todd) if she can go along with them on a blind date with some cowboys from a visiting rodeo. The two maids reluctantly agree. Feeling sorry for Mary, they coach her on their three-step "system" for getting a man interested: flatter him, get him talking about himself, and play on his sympathy with a hard-luck story.

After the rodeo, the three women meet up with their dates at the Rodeo Cafeteria and pair off. Mary is immediately attracted to the tall, lanky, and unpretentious cowboy Stretch Willoughby (Gary Cooper) and arranges to be with him. After dinner, they continue their evening back at Mary's estate. Aware that the plain-spoken Stretch is suspicious of high society, Mary pretends to be a lady's maid whose "boss" is out of town. Mary attempts to get the shy cowboy interested by following the first two steps of the "system" but fails. Determined, she proceeds to the third step, inventing a hard-luck story about her drunken father and four younger sisters whom she alone must support. Stretch is won over, and the evening ends with the two kissing in the moonlight.

The next morning, Stretch appears at the mansion prepared to ask for Mary's hand in marriage. Unprepared, Mary casually dismisses his awkward proposal. Angered at the rejection, Stretch tosses Mary into the swimming pool and storms off. Completely fascinated by this man who is unlike any other she's met, Mary follows Stretch when he boards a ship for Galveston. Determined to apologize, Mary finally succeeds in getting the stubborn cowboy to listen to her, but she is unable to reveal her true identity. The days on board the ship bring the two closer together, and on the last night of the voyage, they are married by the ship's captain.

When the couple arrives at Galveston, they set up in a tent at a rodeo camp. Mary does her best to adapt, but she is having a difficult time. Stretch senses Mary's unease, but believes it stems from her worrying over her "family"—the fictitious drunken father and four younger sisters she's supporting. He suggests she return to Palm Beach alone to settle her family obligations. Although she is ashamed of her continued deception, Mary fears Stretch will reject her if he learns the truth about her wealthy family. Stretch believes he's married a "work horse" who works hard to support her family, not a "show horse" like her fictitious boss. Confused and miserable, Mary agrees to go back home for a few days and later meet up with Stretch at his ranch in Montana.

Back at her Palm Beach mansion, Mary learns that her father is on his way with all his committee members, plus an important congressman who holds the presidential nomination in his power. Her sympathetic Uncle Hannibal arrives early, and Mary tearfully confides her secret marriage to him. When Mary's father arrives, he assumes his daughter will serve as dutiful hostess and support his political plans. Feeling trapped again, Mary finally confesses to her father that she is married to a cowboy and plans to join him in Montana immediately. When she sees her father's disappointment, however, she agrees to stay until her father secures the presidential nomination.

At his Montana ranch, Stretch is busy preparing for Mary's arrival and building a new house for his bride—but Mary never arrives. Stretch heads back to the Palm Beach mansion and insists on talking to Mary's "employers." He bursts into the dining room, only to see his wife at the head of a dinner party table, surrounded by her father and his distinguished guests, who proceed to have a few laughs at the cowboy's expense. When asked for his opinion about Mary's father's running for president, Stretch condemns the whole group for their behavior and leaves in anger. Seeing his daughter's distress, Horace comforts Mary as they listen to the whistle of the train that is taking her husband out of her life.

Back in Montana, a subdued Stretch arrives home only to find his father-in-law sitting on his front porch, wanting to chat about farming. Horace tells Stretch that he has quit the presidential race because he now knows that Mary's happiness is more important, acknowledging that Mary made sacrifices all her life. Upon entering the ranchhouse, the bewildered Stretch finds a party underway, Uncle Hannibal raiding the kitchen, and Mary herself baking a cake with Ma Hawkins. Soon after, the cowboy and the lady are seen kissing in Ma Hawkins' kitchen.

== Cast ==
- Gary Cooper as Stretch Willoughby
- Merle Oberon as Mary Smith
- Patsy Kelly as Katie Callahan
- Walter Brennan as Sugar
- Fuzzy Knight as Buzz
- Mabel Todd as Elly
- Henry Kolker as Horace Smith
- Harry Davenport as Uncle Hannibal Smith
- Emma Dunn as Ma Hawkins
- Walter Walker as Ames
- Berton Churchill as Oliver Wendell Henderson
- Charles Richman as Dillon
- Frederick Vogeding as Ship's Captain
- Ed Brady as Carpenter (uncredited)
- Ethan Laidlaw as Man (uncredited)
- Blue Washington as Dock Worker (uncredited)
- Irving Bacon as Horace Smith's secretary (uncredited)
- Eddie Acuff as Bus Driver (uncredited)
- Charles Coleman as Butler at Dinner Party (uncredited)

== Production ==
=== Filming locations ===
The Cowboy and the Lady was filmed in the following locations:

- Agoura, California, USA
- Bishop, California, USA
- Iverson Ranch, 1 Iverson Lane, Chatsworth, Los Angeles, California, USA
- Lake Malibu, California, USA
- Russell Ranch, New Cuyama, California, USA
- Samuel Goldwyn Studios, 7200 Santa Monica Boulevard, West Hollywood, California, USA (studio)
- Triunfo, California, USA (rodeo sequence)

=== Soundtrack ===
- "A-Tisket A-Tasket" (Ella Fitzgerald and Van Alexander) performed by Harry Davenport
- "The Cowboy and the Lady" (Lionel Newman and Arthur Quenzer) performed by cowboys in the restaurant
- "Red River Valley" (Traditional)
- "Home on the Range" (Daniel E. Kelley and Brewster M. Higley) performed by cowboys in the restaurant
- "Er-ru-ti-tu-ti" (Lionel Newman and Arthur Quenzer) performed by Fuzzy Knight (piano and vocal)
- "Give a Man a Horse He Can Ride" performed by Gary Cooper, Merle Oberon, and an unidentified man on ship
- "Annie Laurie" (William Douglas and Alicia Scott) performed by Gary Cooper (harmonica)

== Reception ==
=== Critical response ===
Once the movie premiered at the Radio City Music Hall, Frank Nugent of The New York Times concluded that the film "just isn't funny enough to justify the very queer picture of American politics and society it presents." According to Nugent, even Gary Cooper, "the picture's greatest asset, has his moments of diminishing returns when he seems to be quoting himself, or when, utterly forsaken by the authors and the director, he looks about helplessly, like a ghost who wonders if he isn't haunting the wrong house."

== Awards and nominations ==
The Cowboy and the Lady received the following awards and nominations:

- 1939 Academy Award for Best Sound Recording (Thomas T. Moulton) Won
- 1939 Academy Award for Best Original Score (Alfred Newman)
- 1939 Academy Award for Best Original Song ("The Cowboy and the Lady" by Lionel Newman and Arthur Quenzer)
