= The Gay Nineties Revue (radio program) =

American old-time radio musical variety program

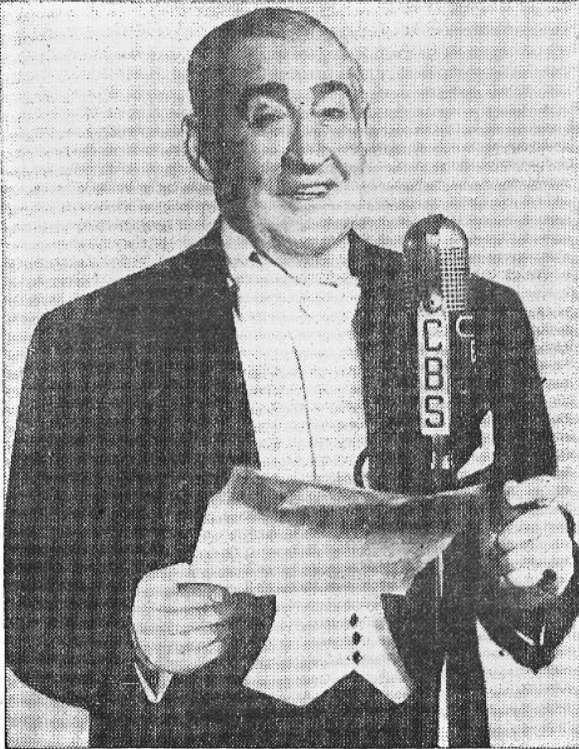
- Joe Howard was host of The Gay Nineties Revue
- Genre: Musical variety
- Country of origin: United States
- Language: English
- Syndicates: CBS
- TV adaptations: The Gay Nineties Revue
- Hosted by: Joe Howard
- Starring: Frank Lovejoy; Beatrice Kay; Lillian Leonard; Genevieve Rowe
- Announcer: John Reed King
- Produced by: Al Rinker
- Original release: July 2, 1939 – November 13, 1944
- Sponsored by: Model Tobacco

The Gay Nineties Revue is an American old-time radio musical variety program. It was broadcast on CBS from July 2, 1939, to November 13, 1944. ABC broadcast a television version of the program in 1948–1949.

== Format ==
The Gay Nineties Revue featured music, comedy, and skits typical of the 1890s based in a nightclub setting. The format was one that was used in American nightclubs, such as Club Royale in Detroit and the Rice Hotel's Empire Room in Houston.

== Personnel ==
Joe Howard was the program's host, and Frank Lovejoy played Broadway Harry. Soloists included Beatrice Kay, Lillian Leonard, and Genevieve Rowe. Singing groups included the Elm City Four and the Floradora Girls. John Reed King was the announcer, and Ray Bloch led the orchestra. Al Rinker was the producer.

== Spinoffs ==
The Gay Nineties Revue produced two spin-offs. Gaslight Gayeties ran on NBC from November 11, 1944, to April 28, 1945, and starred Beatrice Kay. The Beatrice Kay Show ran on Mutual from August 14, 1946, to September 4, 1946.
