= Almost a Lady =

1926 film

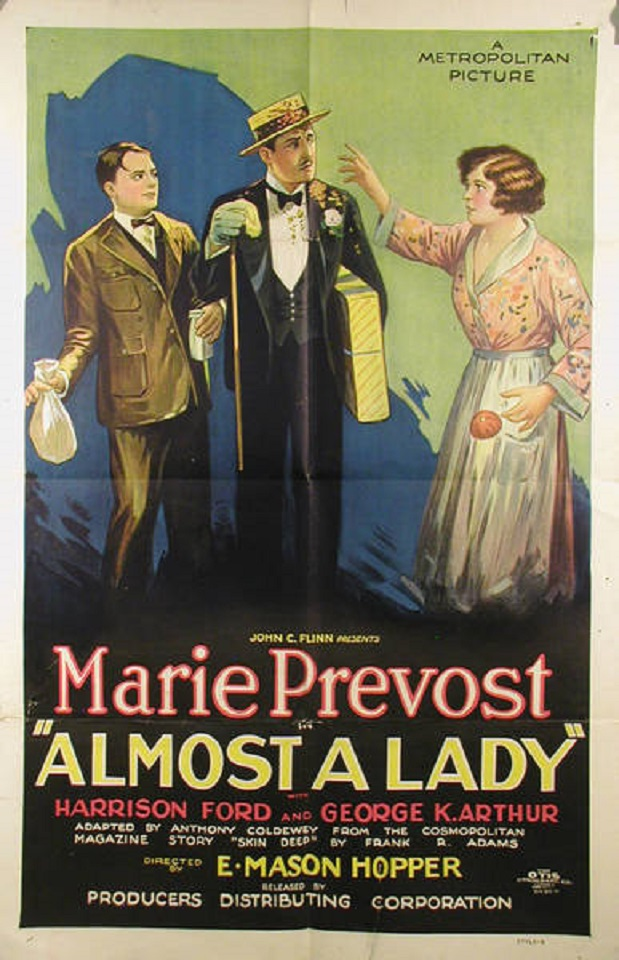
- Film poster
- Directed by: E. Mason Hopper
- Written by: F. McGrew Willis (screenplay); Anthony Coldeway (adaptation)
- Based on: a short story Skin Deep by Frank R. Adams, Cosmopolitan Magazine c.1922
- Produced by: John C. Flinn
- Starring: Marie Prevost; Harrison Ford
- Cinematography: Hal Rosson
- Production company: Metropolitan Pictures Corp. of California
- Distributed by: Producers Distributing Corporation
- Release date: September 27, 1926
- Running time: 6 reels
- Country: United States
- Language: Silent (English intertitles)

Almost a Lady is a 1926 American silent romantic comedy film directed by E. Mason Hopper and starring Marie Prevost.

== Cast ==
- Marie Prevost as Marcia Blake, a gownshop model
- Harrison Ford as William Duke
- George K. Arthur as Bob
- Trixie Friganza as Mrs. Reilly
- John Miljan as Henri
- Barney Gilmore as Mr. Reilly

== Preservation ==
Prints of Almost a Lady survive at the French archive Centre national du cinéma et de l'image animée in Fort de Bois-d'Arcy and the UCLA Film & Television Archive.
