= Richard V. Culter =

American artist (1883–1929)

Richard V. Culter (September 10, 1883 – January 15, 1929) was an American artist who gained fame as an illustrator known primarily for his detailed drawings of people.

== Early life ==
Richard Culter was born in Peoria, Illinois on September 10, 1883. As a young man, Culter moved to New York City, where at age 15 he began his studies at the Art Students League, learning from artists such as George Bridgman, William Merritt Chase, Frank DuMond, and others. Culter devoted four years to studying anatomy and became an expert at drawing the human figure. Later he continued his studies under French masters in Paris. At age 19 he opened his own studio and quickly made a name for himself, drawing illustrations for the most popular magazines of that time, including Life magazine, Collier's Weekly, Cosmopolitan, Harper's Weekly, The Saturday Evening Post, and many others. In addition to drawing the artwork to accompany stories in the magazines, Culter's paintings were featured on the cover of several issues of Life magazine.

== Career ==
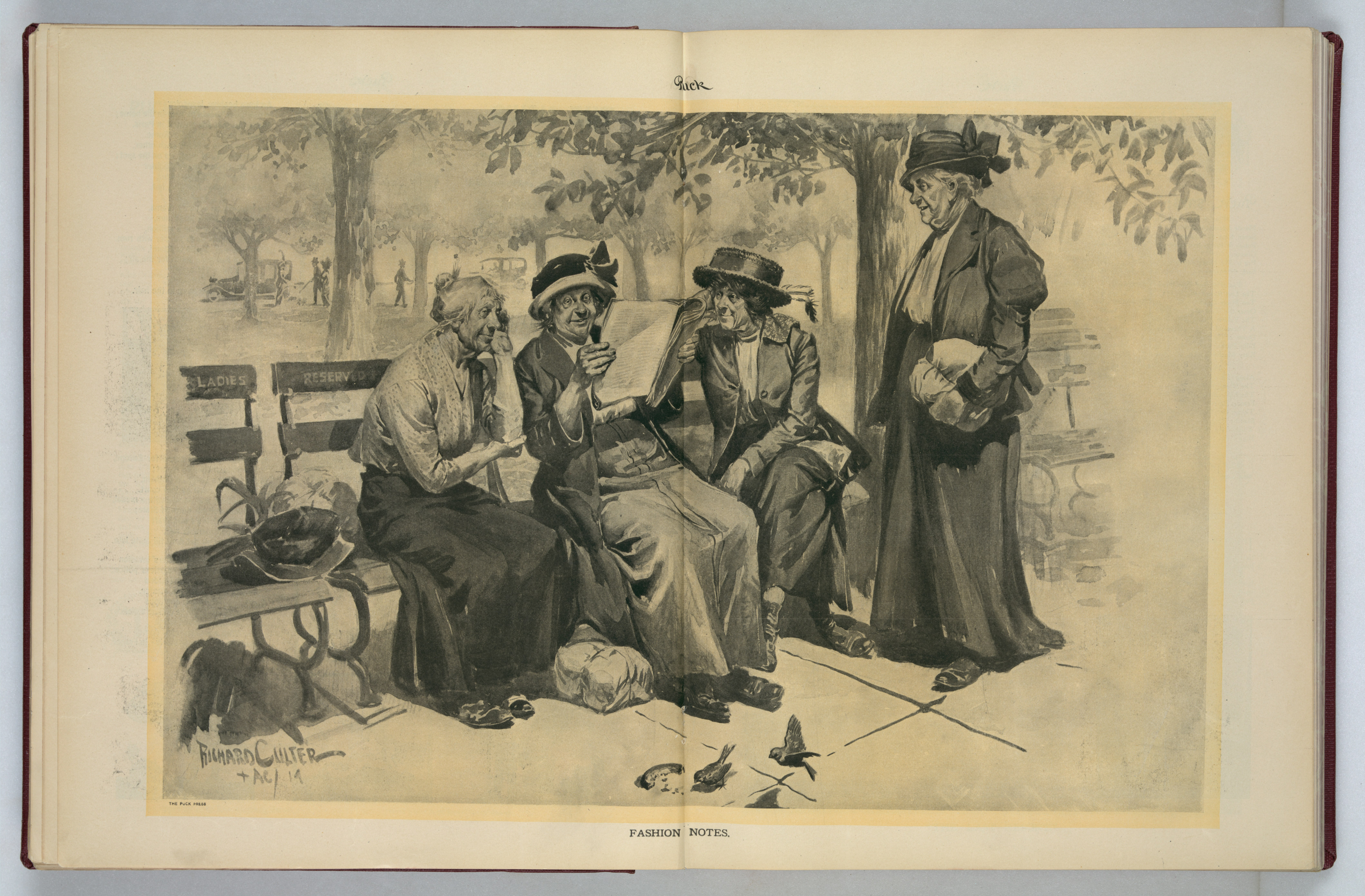
"Fashion notes" by Richard V. Culter

Moving from New York to Chicago, Culter joined the Charles Daniel Frey Company studio where, during the 1920s, he worked as lead illustrator on numerous advertising campaigns for such widely known brands as Paramount Pictures, Philip Morris, Dictaphone, Texaco, Prince Albert, Hamilton Watch Company, and many others. During World War I, Culter served the United States' war effort by drawing patriotic illustrations for the Morale Branch, war bonds and coal conservation. In the latter stages of his life, Culter devoted most of his time to magazine illustrations and was widely sought after, largely due to his whimsical depiction of people. Culter illustrated stories written by famous authors of his time, such as Booth Tarkington. Although devoting most of his time to magazine illustration, Culter worked on Hollywood movies, including collaborations with director Josef von Sternberg.

Culter is credited with coining the phrase the Gay Nineties from a hugely popular series of drawings of scenes and people in 1890s America which he published in Life beginning in 1925 and continuing for several years. Culter published a collection of these drawings in a 1927 book titled The Gay Nineties, An Album of Reminiscent Drawings. The foreword to the book was written by Charles Dana Gibson, editor and owner of Life and a graphic artist with a style similar to Culter's, and who, like Culter, studied at Art Students League in Manhattan, New York.

== Death ==
Beginning in his mid-30s, Culter suffered from tuberculosis, and on the advice of his physicians, began going to Florida in the winter. On January 28, 1929, Culter died at age 45 in Miami, Florida, likely as a result of complications from a serious abdominal operation the previous summer.
