= It Won't Be Long Before We're Home =

Song
- Language: English
- Published: 1918
- Songwriter(s): Lyricist: Paul Cunningham; Composer: Joseph E. Howard

"It Won't Be Long Before We're Home" is a World War I song in the style of a march. It was written by Paul Cunningham and composed by Joseph E. Howard. This song was published in 1918 by M. Witmark & Sons, in New York, NY.

The sheet music cover depicts a soldier celebrating standing on a battlefield with German helmets and an inset photo of Joseph E. Howard along with a note that the song was used in the Song Bird Review.

The sheet music can be found at the Pritzker Military Museum & Library.
