= The Time, the Place and the Girl (1929 film) =

1929 musical film

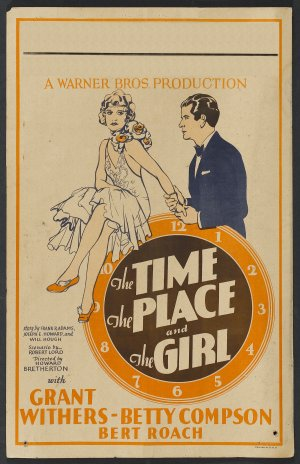
- Theatrical release poster
- Directed by: Howard Bretherton
- Written by: Robert Lord; De Leon Anthony (titles)
- Based on: The Time, the Place, and the Girl; 1907 play by Frank R. Adams; William M. Hough; Joseph E. Howard
- Starring: Grant Withers; Betty Compson
- Cinematography: John Stumar
- Edited by: Jack Killifer
- Music by: Alois Reiser
- Production company: Warner Bros. Pictures
- Distributed by: Warner Bros. Pictures
- Release date: July 8, 1929
- Running time: 70 minutes
- Country: United States
- Language: English

The Time, the Place and the Girl is a 1929 American sound (All-Talking) pre-Code black-and-white musical romantic comedy film directed by Howard Bretherton and starring Grant Withers and Betty Compson. It is based on the 1907 musical play of the same name. It is not related to the 1946 musical film of the same name.

Since the 1970s, the film has been considered lost, with only its soundtrack remaining.

== Plot ==
Jim Crane, a star football player at Stanton College, is the nation's latest sensation. His name and photo grace the front pages of newspapers, and he is constantly pursued by enthusiastic fans. This fame has inflated Jim's ego far beyond reason.

Unbeknownst to him, Mae Ellis, his devoted classmate, is deeply in love with him. Yet Jim barely notices her existence. He relies on Mae's help to maintain passing grades in his easy courses so he can remain eligible for the big game.

On game day, Jim's team trails 3 to 0 with only three minutes remaining. Suddenly, Jim breaks through with an incredible 75-yard run for a touchdown just as the final whistle sounds. His triumph only swells his pride further.

Riding this wave of success, Jim falls into the company of wealthy New Yorkers, including Doris Ward and her husband Peter Ward, a Wall Street operator rumored to bend the rules. Peter urges Jim to join him in New York after graduation, offering a bond-selling job. The flirtatious glances from Doris make the offer even more tempting.

At a hotel telegraph desk, Peter unexpectedly meets Mae and is impressed by her poise and efficiency. He offers her a job in his office, which she initially declines but accepts upon learning Jim has taken the position.

Reunited at Ward's office, Jim barely recognizes Mae. As a salesman, Jim fails miserably; his arrogance alienates colleagues and clients alike. At a Long Island party, women—including Mrs. Davis, Mrs. Winters, and Mrs. Parks—flock to Jim, inciting jealousy and hostility.

Mae watches helplessly, hoping to rescue Jim from his impending downfall.

When Jim can't sell a single bond, Ward devises a scheme. He and his star salesman plan to set Jim up in his own office to unload worthless stock onto eager women, leaving Jim responsible and risking jail. Mae overhears the plan and fears for Jim.

Believing the bonds legitimate, Jim begins selling them. Mrs. Davis, Mrs. Winters, and Mrs. Parks become early victims.

Desperate, Jim convinces Doris to buy $20,000 in stock to earn his sales bonus.

At a Long Island party, Ward's jealousy flares seeing Doris's attraction to Jim. Doris forces herself on Jim, but when Ward storms into Jim's room, Mae slips in and replaces Doris. Doris angrily confronts Ward in front of the guests.

Humbled, Ward offers Doris anything to make amends. She demands $20,000 for a necklace and hands the money to Jim, who repays the women with full interest, redeeming himself.

Learning of the money's fate, Ward hunts for Jim, only to be told by the butler that Jim and Mae have already left, heading West together.

== Cast ==
- Grant Withers as Jim Crane
- Betty Compson as Doris Ward
- Gertrude Olmstead as Mae Ellis
- James Kirkwood, Sr. as The Professor
- Vivien Oakland as Mrs. Davis
- Gretchen Hartman as Mrs. Winters
- Irene Haisman as Mrs. Parks
- John Davidson as Pete Ward
- Gerald King as Radio Announcer
- Bert Roach as Bert Holmes

== Soundtrack ==
A theme song was especially written for the film by Joseph E. Howard. This official theme song of the film is entitled "Honeymoon." Honeymoon was published as sheet music that featured a picture of Betty Compson as she appeared in the film. Joseph E. Howard recorded this new song for Brunswick records (Catalog Number 4340) along with the song "Blow The Smoke Away" which is also heard on the soundtrack. In addition several old songs are heard instrumentally on the soundtrack. These include the following:

- "I Wonder Who's Kissing Her Now"

Written by Joseph E. Howard and Harold Orlob
Lyrics by William M. Hough and Frank R. Adams

- "Collegiate"

Written by Moe Jaffe and Nat Bonx

- "Collegiana"

Written by Jimmy McHugh and Dorothy Fields

- "Doin' the Raccoon"

Written by Raymond Klages, J. Fred Coots and Herb Magidson

- "Fashionette"

Written by Robert King and Jack Glogau

- "Jack and Jill"

Written Larry Spier and Sam Coslow

- "How Many Times"

Written by Irving Berlin

- "Everything I Do I Do For You"

Written by Al Sherman

- "If You Could Care"

Written by E. Ray Goetz, Arthur Wimperis and Herman Darewski

== See also ==
- List of lost films
- List of early sound feature films (1926–1929)
- List of early Warner Bros. sound and talking features
