= Goodbye, My Lady Love =

1904 song by Joe Howard

"Goodbye, My Lady Love" is a 1904 hit popular song written and sung by Joe Howard. The Henry Burr recording of the song was #3 on the charts, and it was a #5 hit for Harry MacDonough the same year. The song was later used in a 1924 Max Fleischer film called Song Car-Tunes and in the 1927 Broadway show Show Boat.
