= Genevieve Rowe =

American singer (1908–1995)

- Born: August 28, 1908; Fremont, Ohio
- Died: February 26, 1995 (aged 86); New York, New York
- Education: Wooster College; Juilliard Graduate School of Opera
- Spouse: Albert Payson Hill

Genevieve Rowe (August 28, 1908 - February 26, 1995) was a coloratura soprano in the era of old-time radio.

== Early years ==
Rowe was born in Fremont, Ohio. In her hometown of Wooster, Ohio, both of her parents were music educators; her father was dean of music at the Wooster College Conservatory, and her mother taught piano and music theory there. Although she began studying piano at age 4, she eventually came to prefer singing. She was a graduate of Wooster College with degrees in arts and music and studied on scholarship at the Juilliard Graduate School of Opera. She later studied singing privately with Sidney Dietch.

A 1939 newspaper article about Rowe noted, "Miss Rowe had the happy habit of winning every musical competition she entered." Those contests included the 1929 Atwater Kent national auditions, the 1932 McDowell Club Award, the 1933 National Federation of Music Clubs contest, and the 1938 Rising Musical Star competition on NBC radio.

Rowe gained early experience in radio when she sang over WTAM while she was a student at Wooster.

== Career ==
In 1938, Rowe had the role of Beauty in Vittorio Giannini's Beauty and the Beast on CBS, radio's first commissioned opera. She also was one of the featured vocalists on The First American Opera Festival, a sustaining program that was broadcast on WOR in 1942. The one-hour program presented adaptations of seven operas and promoted sales of savings bonds and stamps for the U.S. Treasury Department.

On radio, Rowe was the female vocalist on Gaslight Gayeties and Harvest of Stars,. She performed regularly on Johnny Presents, the Burl Ives Coffee Club and the Gay Nineties Revue. Other shows on which she was heard included Melody Hall. In 1945 she used the pseudonym Irene Hill on one radio show because she was singing regularly on two network programs.

Rowe sang with the Montreal Opera, the Westchester Philharmonic Society, and other groups.

In 1947, Rowe and Glen Burris, accompanied by Paul Baron's orchestra, recorded The Student Prince Album (Majestic MZ-4), containing six discs. In 1948, Rowe — along with Lillian Cornell and Lawrence Brooks, accompanied by Sigmund Romberg's orchestra and chorus — recorded Gems From Sigmund Romberg Shows Vol. II (Victor MO 1256). The album contained four discs.

== Personal life ==
Rowe was married to Albert Payson Hill, a teacher. He was a pianist who often accompanied her in concerts.
