= Ida Emerson =

American songwriter

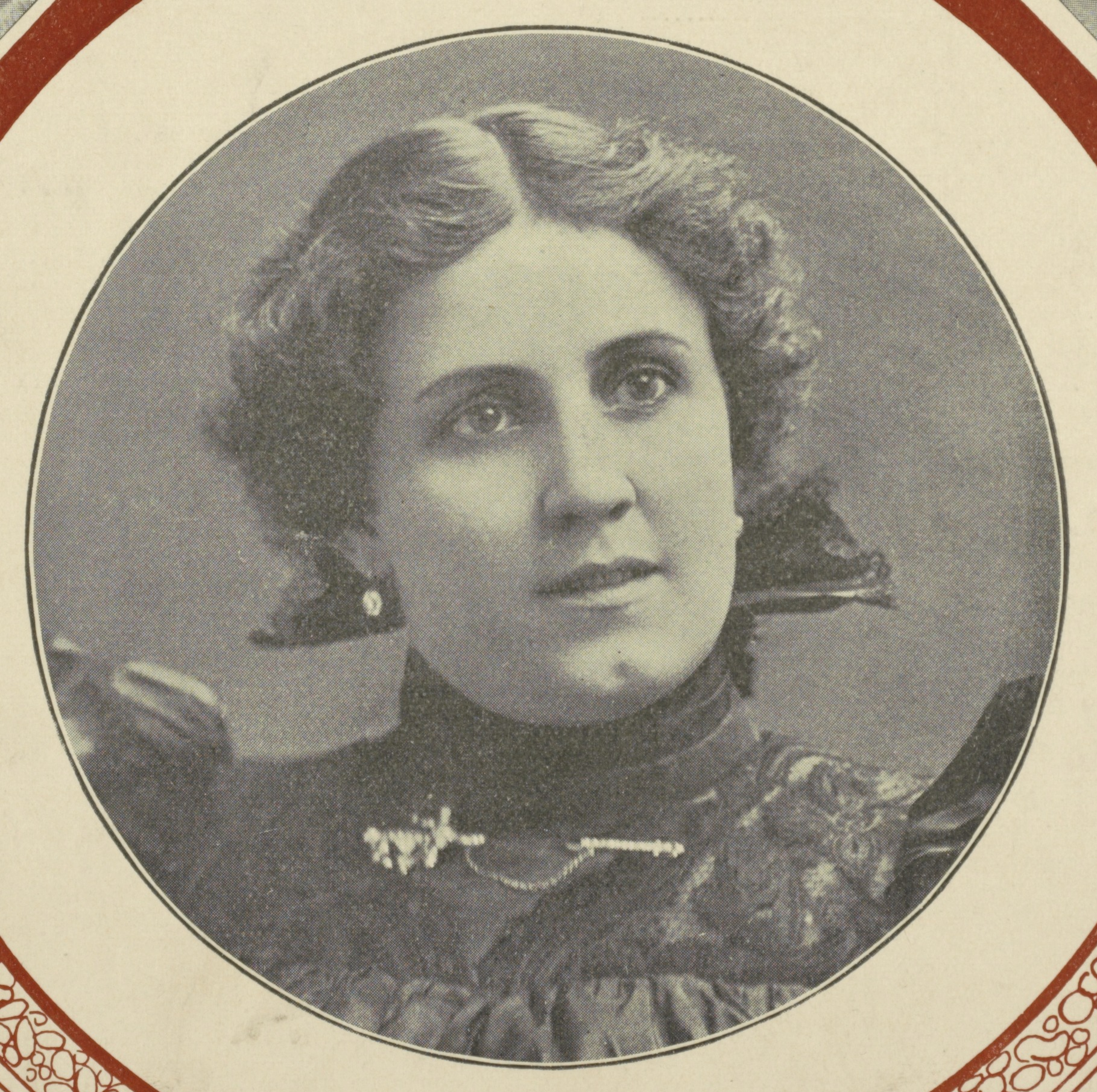
Ida Emerson

Ida Emerson (17 April 1873 – 25 September 1945) was a Broadway composer and lyricist. She was one of the few women admitted to the famed group of songwriters of Tin Pan Alley, where she worked with her husband, composer, lyricist, arranger and librettist Joseph E. Howard as part of the song writing team of Howard and Emerson.

Emerson met Howard when he was 17. After the death of his first wife, Mabel Barrison, the two were married. They worked the Midwestern vaudeville circuit, gaining notice in Chicago that landed them a gig in New York at Tony Pastor's Music Hall on 14th Street.

== Songs ==
- "Hello Ma Baby" (1899) – The song that brought her lasting fame and success was a syncopated novelty telephone number called "Hello, Ma Baby," published in 1899. It sold over a million copies of sheet music within a couple of months. It is best known works to modern audiences. It was popularized in modern culture by the singing Michigan J. Frog of the Warner Bros. Cartoons.
