= From the Vine Came the Grape =

"From the Vine Came the Grape" is a popular song.

It was written by Leonard Whitcup and Paul Cunningham in 1950.

The biggest-selling version was recorded by The Gaylords in 1954. It was also a hit for The Hilltoppers the same year.

A recording by Frankie Vaughan with Geoff Love and his orchestra was made in London on December 10, 1953. It was released by EMI on the His Master's Voice label as catalog number B 10655. The B-side was "She Took"

A popular Italian translation of the song was written by Alan Gerard (Senatore) and Pat Noto.

The lyrics to the Italian verse of the song sung by The Gaylords is as follows:

del vino vien l'uva, dall'uva il vino, dal vino un sogno d'amore,

io son' sognando con te io ritorno, Maria vicino tuo cuore, vediamo la vita della mia Maria, gli occhi piu' belli non ce',

o del vino vien l'uva, dall'uva il vino, dal vino un sogno di te...

A rough translation of these lyrics in English is as follows:

From the vine came the grape, from the grape came the wine, from the wine a dream of love,

I am dreaming of returning with you, Maria close to your heart, We see the life of my Maria, more beautiful eyes do not exist,

O from the vine came the grape, from the grape came the wine, from the wine a dream of you...
