= Ray Bloch =

Musical artist (1902-1982)

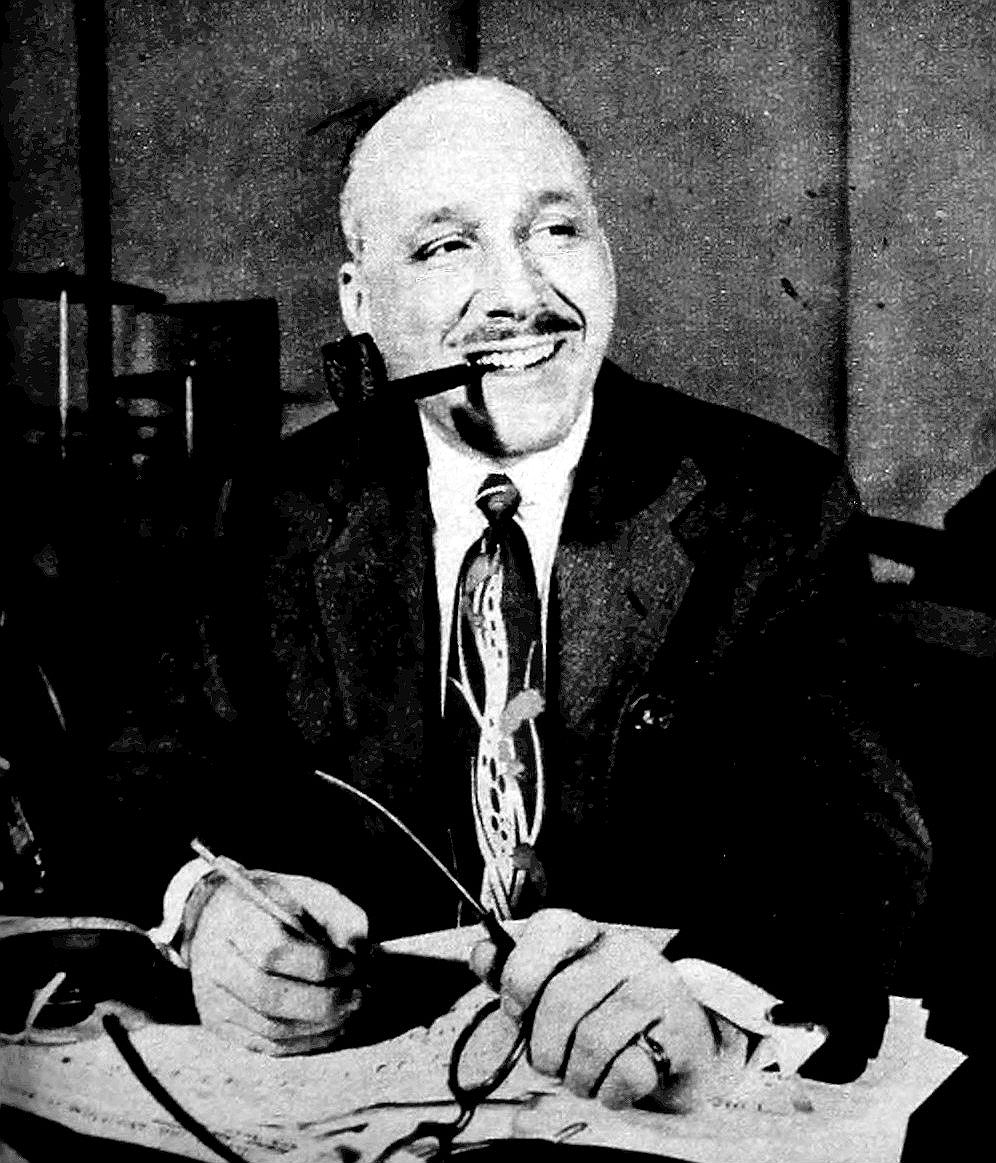
- Bloch in 1951

Background information
- Born: Raymond Arthur Bloch; August 3, 1902; Alsace-Lorraine, German Empire
- Died: March 29, 1982 (aged 79) Miami, Florida, US
- Occupations: composer, songwriter, conductor, pianist, and arranger
- Instrument: Piano
- Label: Signature Records
- Formerly of: Ray Bloch Orchestra
- Website: raybloch.com

Raymond Arthur Bloch (August 3, 1902 – March 29, 1982) was an American composer, songwriter, conductor, pianist, author and arranger. He is best remembered as the arranger and orchestra conductor for The Ed Sullivan Show during its entire run from 1948 to 1971.

== Biography ==
Ray Bloch was born in Alsace-Lorraine and immigrated to the United States with his parents as an infant. His father was a chef.

== Career ==
During the 1920s, he performed with small groups on piano and also conducted ballroom bands. Later in the decade he began appearing as a pianist on radio stations. He began working as an arranger and composer for the Four Eton Boys in the early 1930s, and followed that as a conductor for choral groups. In 1939 he joined the CBS radio variety show Johnny Presents as choral director and was promoted to orchestra conductor. This was the beginning of a long and successful career in "conducting, coaching, orchestrating, and choral directing" on radio, television, and albums.

=== Radio ===
Bloch and his orchestra were featured on numerous radio variety shows of the late-1930s and 1940s. These included: Johnny Presents (1939-1946), The Gay Nineties Revue (CBS, 1939–1944), Let Yourself Go (CBS, 1944–1945), The Continental Celebrity Club (1945-1946), The Milton Berle Show (NBC, 1948–1949), and The Mary Small Revue (1945). From 1943 to 1956 Bloch and his orchestra also performed on Here's to Romance, a weekly musical variety show broadcast by the American Forces Network. In 1951 Bloch hosted his own show, The Bloch Party, a 60-minute variety show on CBS Radio featuring Judy Lynn, the Russ Emery Chorus, and the Ray Bloch Orchestra.

The orchestra was a fixture on several game shows, including Take It or Leave It (CBS, 1940–1947). Quick as a Flash (1944–1949) – during which "clues were elaborately dramatized or were musically illustrated by Ray Bloch's orchestra" – and Sing It Again (1948–1951). Bloch also worked on Philip Morris Playhouse (CBS, 1939–1943), and in several Orson Welles drama presentations.

In 1945 Bloch signed an exclusive contract with Signature Records to serve as "musical conductor for all disks by individual singers". The Ray Bloch Orchestra backed many singers, including The Five DeMarco Sisters, Kay Armen, and Monica Lewis. The orchestra itself was featured on Signature Records' The Merry Christmas Album (1947), Best Loved Christmas Music Album (1947), and a 78 record with the songs "I Must Have Your Love" and "Together" (1953). Bloch wrote songs such as "When Love Has Gone", "You're Everything That's Lovely", "In the Same Old Way", "In My Little Red Book", "The Wide Open Spaces", "Sam the Vegetable Man", "Let's Make Up a Little Party", and "If You Were Mine". He often worked with W. Edward Breuder and Paul Rusincky.

=== Television ===
Bloch was the arranger and orchestra conductor for The Ed Sullivan Show from the show's debut on June 20, 1948 until its final show in June 1971. He also led the orchestra for The Jackie Gleason Show. Each week during his show, Jackie Gleason would introduce Bloch as "the flower of the music world".

When asked for a comment after The Beatles' performance on The Ed Sullivan Show on 9 February 1964 Bloch said, "The only thing that's different is the hair, as far as I can see. I give them a year."

== Other activities ==
He was on the original board of governors of the Academy of Television Arts and Sciences and also on the board of the New York Friars' Club. In the 1950s he founded Ray Bloch Productions, which continues to produce events for the entertainment and corporate industries.

== Later years ==
Bloch retired to Miami. He died of a heart attack there on March 29, 1982.
