= Harold Orlob =

American songwriter (1883–1982)

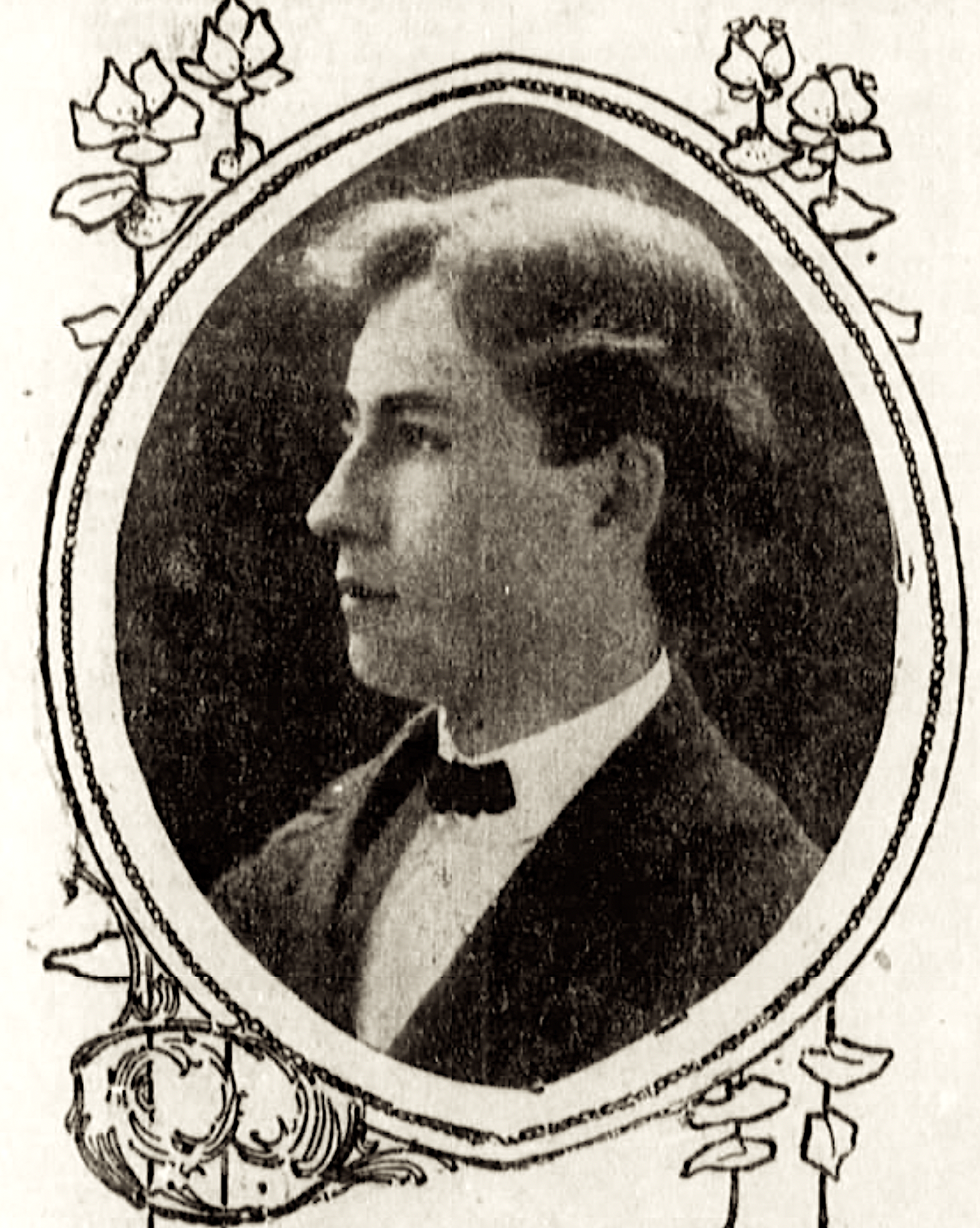
- Orlob in 1904
- Born: June 3, 1883; Logan, Utah, U.S.
- Died: June 25, 1982 (aged 99); Salt Lake City, Utah, U.S.
- Occupations: Composer; lyricist; film producer
- Years active: 1907–1982

Harold Orlob (June 3, 1883 – June 25, 1982) was an American composer, lyricist, director, and film producer. He is best known for writing the melody to the song "I Wonder Who's Kissing Her Now" (1909), a work for which he was long uncredited until he successfully sued for co-authorship credit in 1947. He wrote the scores to many Broadway musicals in the 1910s and 1920s, the most successful of which was the musical Listen Lester, a hit of the 1918–1919 Broadway season.

A native of Utah, Orlob published his first songs while a teenager in Salt Lake City, where he was active as a musician in local professional orchestras in his youth. He studied engineering at the University of Utah (UU) but was simultaneously active in music at the university, taking lessons with music professor John J. McClellan. His first musical, The Prince and the Peasant, was staged at the Salt Lake Theatre in 1902. After graduating from UU in 1903, he studied music with Alberto Jonás at the Michigan Conservatory of Music in Detroit. He moved to New York City in 1905 to work as a songwriter in Tin Pan Alley and on Broadway for the Shubert Brothers, initially composing songs which were interpolated into productions principally crafted by others. In addition to writing scores for the New York stage, he also wrote the scores to several musicals produced in Chicago or that toured. He briefly worked in Hollywood as a producer for Paramount Pictures, and also operated a recording studio during his career. He died in Salt Lake City in 1982 at the age of 99.

== Early life and education ==
The son of Christian and Frances Orlob, Harold Fred Orlob was born in Logan, Utah, on June 3, 1883. He moved with his family to Salt Lake City (SLC) at the age of three. His father worked for the ZCMI department store company. He was educated in Salt Lake City School District, and studied piano in SLC with Frank W. Merrill. He began composing in the 1890s while a teenager, with his first published composition being the cakewalk "White Trash" (1899, published in SLC by the Utah Lithographing Co.) He was in the eighth grade (then the highest grade) at Lowell School in the Twentieth Ward of SLC at the time of the song's publication. By that same year he was the music director of his own youth orchestra in SLC which performed for community events.

In 1900 Orlob entered the University of Utah (UU) as a freshman and was actively playing as a pianist for school dances among other events. That year he founded the UU's orchestra (then a student club), and served as its first music director. In 1901 he performed as a pianist at a UU event featuring Governor Heber Manning Wells as the main speaker. In addition to performing at events as a pianist, he also played in ensembles as a cornetist. He originally intended to pursue a career as an architect rather than as a musician, but did take music lessons at UU with John J. McClellan. He graduated from the university in 1903 with a degree in engineering, and was named a distinguished alumni in 1965.

After graduating from UU, Orlob pursued further studies in music at the Michigan Conservatory of Music in Detroit (MCM) where he earned a music degree. He studied piano with Alberto Jonás at both the MCM in Detroit and privately in New York. His other principal teacher at the MCM was Jean Van Der Velpen, with whom he studied music theory, composition, and orchestration.

== Early career ==
Orlob began his career as a teenager in SLC working as a musician in the resident band of the Salt Lake Theatre (SLT) where he also staged operettas. He also was a member of L. P. Christensen's orchestra which was then SLC's principal symphony. He was both composer and lyricist for his first musical, The Prince and the Peasant, which was staged at the SLT when he was just eighteen years old in 1902. He published several songs while living in Utah, among them the coon song "I'se Done Lost My Job" (1901, Mellwood Publishing Co. of St. Louis) and "Mamie Kane of Maine" (1901, Willis Woodward & Co. of New York). In 1901 he traveled to New York City to try and get his work published there, and attracted the interest of M. Witmark & Sons who agreed to publish two of his songs.

In 1904 Orlob's opera, The Merry Grafters, was staged at the Detroit Opera House as a benefit for Detroit's Woman's Hospital and Infant Home. It used a libretto by Dr. E. L. Shurly, a prominent physician in Detroit. This led to work writing music for playwrights Addison Burkhardt and Max Hoffmann for the musical Bonnie Annie Laurie (1904). This was followed by music composed for The Seminary Girl, a work staged at the Great Northern Theatre in Chicago in 1905 with Orlob conducting the musical forces. This production toured to cities throughout the Midwestern United States. He also contributed music to the touring musicals Look Who's Here and Anita the Singing Girl (1907) in the early part of his career.

== Tin Pan Alley and musical theatre composer ==
In 1905 Orlob moved to New York City where he was employed by the Shubert brothers as a composer and arranger. He contributed two songs, "Are You Engaged?" and "I'm Fond of You", to their 1905 touring production of Babes in the Wood, and authored music for James T. Powers's Ysaye (1905). In 1906 he married Margaret Neely of Chicago at Britton Hall in New York City. His wife was an actress known on the stage as Lita Gilmore who was performing in the Girl and the Gambler company at the time of their marriage. That same year his song "Don't You Care" was interpolated into the Shubert's Broadway musical My Lady's Maid.

In New York City Orlob worked as a songwriter for Tin Pan Alley publishing houses with some of his published songs being interpolated in Broadway musicals. His song "With Mary Ann on a Merry-Go-Round" was published by Joseph W. Stern & Co. in 1907, a work which was performed in the musical The Maid and the Millionaire (1907). His song "Stephen Was a Minister" was included in the show Two Islands (1907). With Irving Berlin, Louis A. Hirsch, and Earl Carroll he collaborated on the music for The Passing Show of 1912. In 1914 he was a founding member of American Society of Composers, Authors and Publishers.

The biggest success of Orlob's career was the hit song "I Wonder Who's Kissing Her Now" (lyrics by Will M. Hough and Frank R. Adams). He wrote the music for this song while working as an arranger for Joseph E. Howard for the musical The Prince of Tonight (1909). Howard was a known song thief who often took credit for work others did, and when it came time for publishing this work he claimed he had authored this song's music. While Howard did have some creative input into the song, the melody was entirely crafted by Orlob. This went uncredited until 1947 when Orlob successfully sued to have himself credited as a composer at the time that the biographical film about Howard, I Wonder Who's Kissing Her Now, was released by 20th Century Fox. He did not claim royalties as a part of the lawsuit. The song was later interpolated into the 1955 Broadway production of Maurice Chevalier in an evening of Songs and Impressions.

Orlob wrote the score to several musicals produced in Chicago, including The Flirting Princess (1909), Miss Nobody from Starland (1910), The Heartbreakers (1911), and A Trial Honeymoon (1924). He became a prolific composer for Broadway with his most successful work being the musical Listen Lester which was a hit of the 1918–1919 season. It ran for 272 performances, and included the song "Waiting", which was recorded by several artists of the era. He also wrote the scores to the Broadway musicals A La Broadway (1911, starring Mae West), An Aztec Romance (1912, based on the novel Corianton by B. H. Roberts and adapted by the playwright Orestes U. Bean), The Red Canary (1914), Ned Wayburn's Town Topics (1915), Nothing But Love (1919), Just a Minute (1919), Ginger (1923), and Talk About Girls (1927).

With Harry B. Smith and Frederick Herendeen, Orlob created the musical The Masked Model (1917) which played in Pennsylvania but never made it to New York. His musical Suzanne was stage at the National Theatre in Washington D.C. in 1926. His musical The Moon Maiden, Making Merry toured in 1931. In 1939 he produced the film ...One Third of a Nation... for Paramount Pictures. After a long absence from the New York stage, he returned to Broadway with Hairpin Harmony (1943), a legendary flop which was skewered in the press and closed after just three performances. He also owned and operated a recording studio, and composed one symphony, Recreation.

Orlob died in Salt Lake City on June 25, 1982, at the age of 99.
