= The Little Shoemaker =

Song by The Gaylords
- Released: 1954
- Genre: pop song
- Label: Mercury Records
- Composers: Francis Lemargue (original French language), English version by Geoffrey Claremont Parsons and John Turner

The Little Shoemaker is a popular song based on the French song, "Le petit cordonnier", by Rudi Revil. The original French lyric was written by Francis Lemarque (page in French). The English language lyrics were written by Geoffrey Claremont Parsons, Nathan Korb (Francis Lemarque) and John Turner.

== Notable covers ==
In the United States, the best-selling version was recorded by the Gaylords, charting in 1954 at No. 2 on Cashbox and the Hot 100. It also charted for another American singer, Eddie Fisher, reaching No. 9 on the Hot 100 and also at No. 2 on Cashbox.

In the United Kingdom, the song was the first chart hit for Petula Clark the same year.

The recording by the Gaylords, with the chorus sung in both English and Italian, was released by Mercury Records as catalog number 70403. It first reached the Billboard Best Seller chart on June 23, 1954, and lasted 19 weeks on the chart, peaking at No. 2.

The recording by the Hugo Winterhalter orchestra on May 25, 1954, was released by RCA Victor Records as catalog number 20-5769. It first reached the Billboard Best Seller chart on July 7, 1954, and lasted 11 weeks on the chart, peaking at #9. The flip side of this recording, "The Magic Tango", also charted, reaching #25. Eddie Fisher provided the vocal but was credited on the label only as "a friend"!

The song has also been recorded by Rosemary Clooney on July 9, 1954, singing a French-language version of the chorus as well as the English-language chorus.

In Australia, a version of the song was released on the Decca label, catalogue number Y 6605, by Frank Weir & His Saxophone And Orchestra, with vocals by The Michael Twins, in 1954.

It has also been recorded by Alma Cogan and The Kordites with orchestra cond. by Frank Cordell in London on April 7, 1954. Her recording was released in 1954 by EMI on the His Master's Voice label as catalog numbers B 10698 and 7M 219. The flip side was "Chiqui Chaqui".

Eve Boswell was another who recorded the song in 1954.

Knud Pfeiffer wrote the Danish lyrics. The Danish title is "Den lille skomager". Raquel Rastenni, acc. Harry Felbert's sextet, Cond.: Harry Felbert recorded it in Copenhagen in 1954. The song was released on His Master's Voice X 8211. It was arranged by Ole Mortensen.

The Swedish version "Den lille skomakaren" with lyrics by Karl-Lennart was recorded by Britt-Inger Dreilick (recorded in Stockholm 3 September 1954), by Pia Lang and by the 15 year old child artist Inger Axö.
