= Hello! Ma Baby =

1899 song by Joseph E. Howard and Ida Emerson

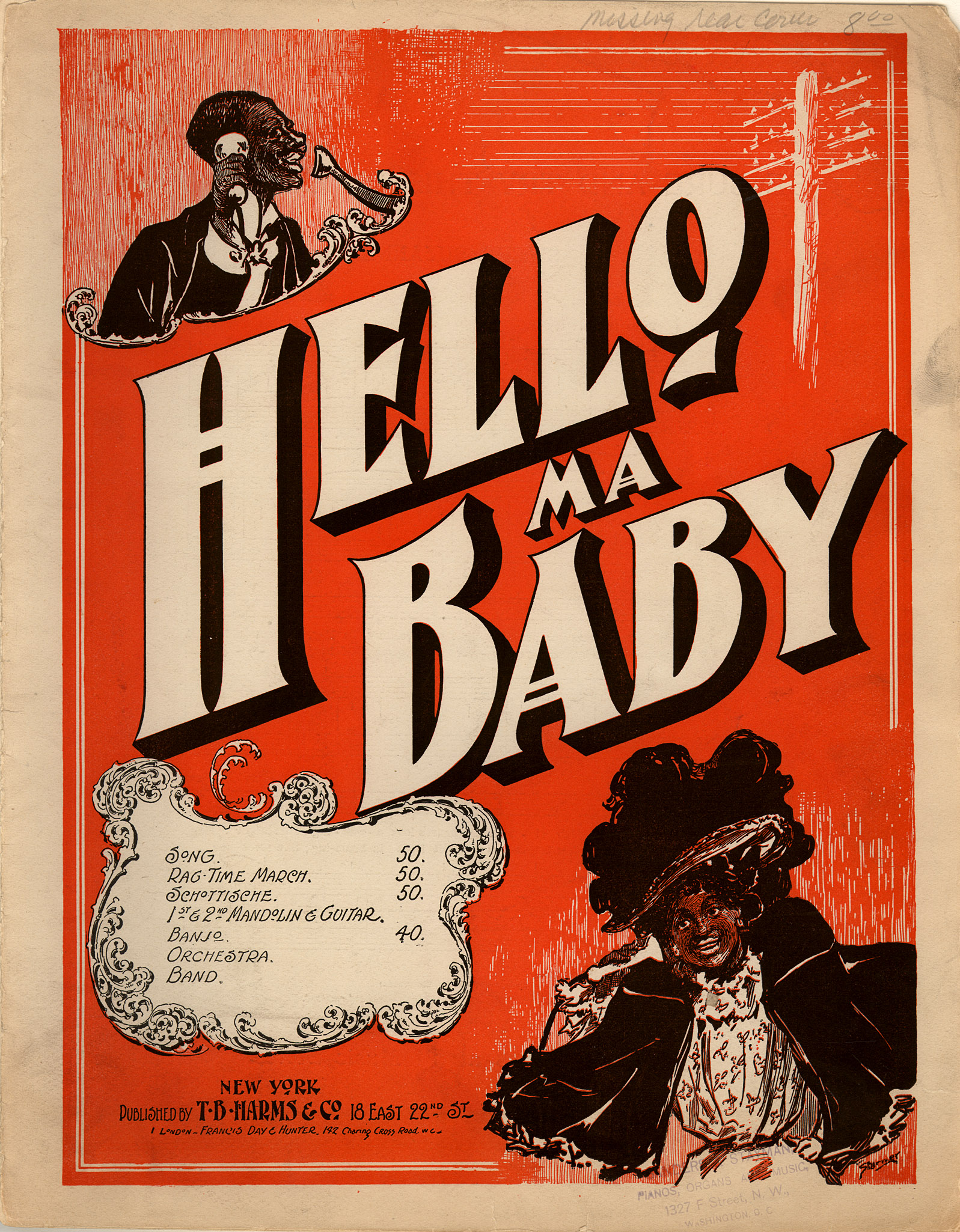
Original sheet-music cover from 1899

"Hello! Ma Baby" is a Tin Pan Alley song written in 1899 by the songwriting team of Joseph E. Howard and Ida Emerson, known as "Howard and Emerson". Its subject is a man who has a girlfriend he knows only through the telephone. At the time, telephones were relatively novel, present in fewer than 10% of U.S. households, and this was the first well-known song to refer to the device. Additionally, the word "Hello" itself was primarily associated with telephone use after Edison's utterance—by 1889, "Hello Girl" was slang for a telephone operator—though it later became a general greeting for all situations.

The song was first recorded by Arthur Collins on an Edison 5470 phonograph cylinder.

The song may be best known today as the introductory song in the famous Warner Bros. cartoon One Froggy Evening (1955), sung by the character later dubbed Michigan J. Frog and high-stepping in the style of a cakewalk. The scene is parodied with a xenomorph in the 1987 film Spaceballs and a baby in the 2005 film Son of the Mask. The song was also referenced in the 2026 television show Stuart Fails to Save the Universe, sung by “Weird Al” Yankovic.

== Sheet music and the Warner Bros. acquisition of the song ==
Howard and Emerson's
Hello! Ma Baby
(As sung by Arthur Collins in 1899)

The sheet music was published by T. B. Harms & Co., which was acquired by Warner Bros. before the stock market crash of 1929 (during the advent of the "Talkies" era of cinema).
