= Paul Cunningham (songwriter) =

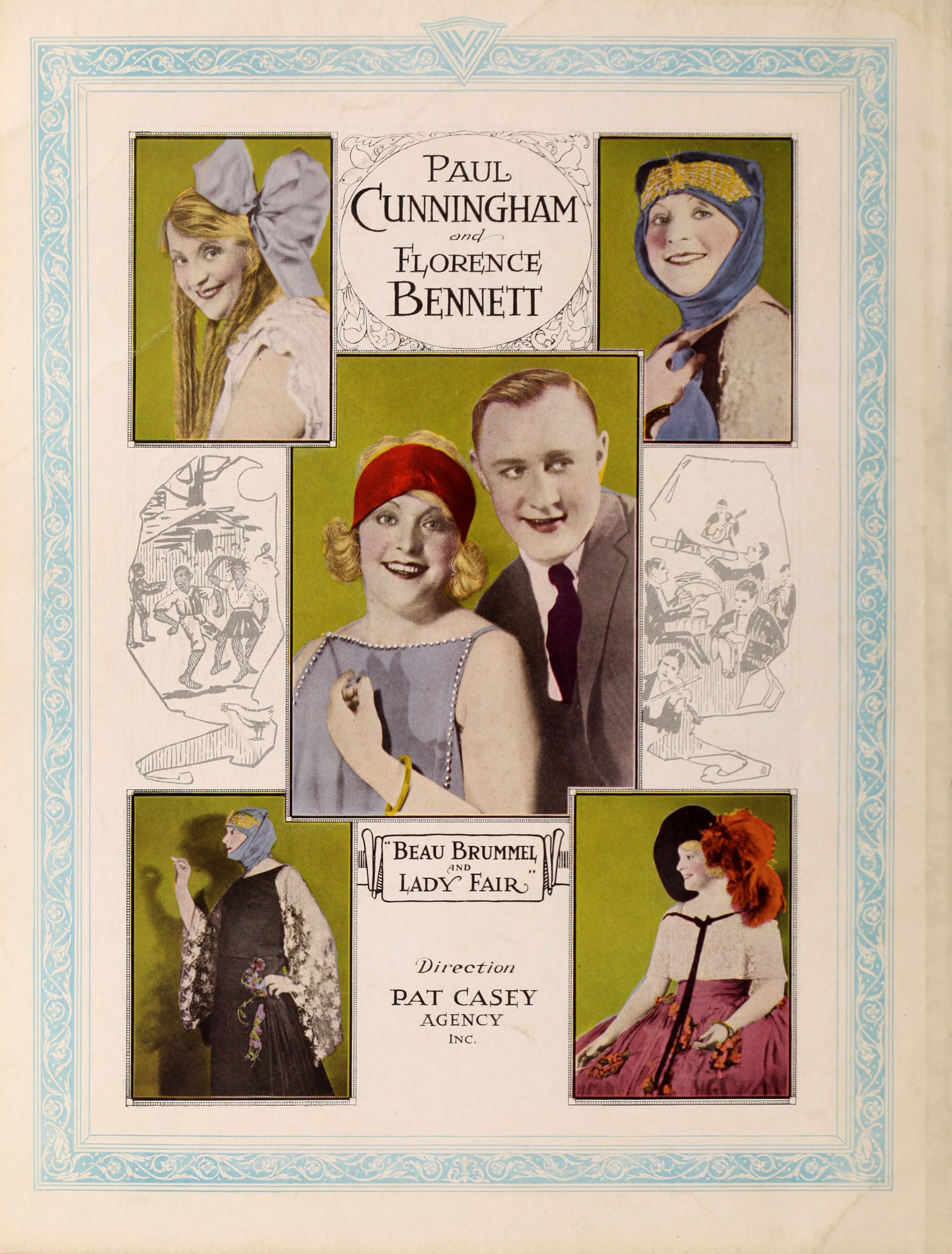
Paul Cunningham and Florence Bennett

Paul Cunningham (January 25, 1890, New York City - August 14, 1960, New York City) was an American composer, lyricist, songwriter, and singer. A graduate of the Manhattan College of Music, he began his career working in vaudeville as both a vocalist and songwriter; often in collaboration with Florence Bennett. He wrote the lyrics to the World War I song "It Won't Be Long Before We're Home", and the World War II enlistment song "Four Buddies". He composed the music to "When the Robert E. Lee Arrives in Old Tennessee (All the Way from Gay Paree)" with J. Keirn Brennan serving as his lyricist.

Cunningham collaborated on numerous songs with composer Ernie Burnett, and also worked with Ira Schuster. His most successful songs were "All Over Nothing At All", "From the Vine Came the Grape", "Harriet", "I Am An American", and "Tripoli (The Shores of)". In 1956, he was elected president of the American Society of Composers, Authors and Publishers.
