= I Wonder Who's Kissing Her Now =

1909 popular song

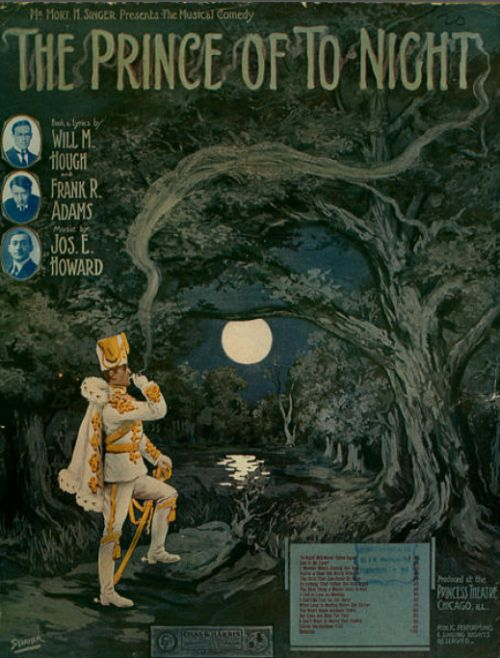
- Sheet music cover, 1909

Song
- Published: 1909 by Chas. K. Harris
- Composers: Joseph E. Howard, Harold Orlob
- Lyricists: Will M. Hough, Frank R. Adams

"I Wonder Who's Kissing Her Now" is a popular song. The music was written by Harold Orlob, the lyrics by Will M. Hough and Frank R. Adams. Orlob worked for Joseph E. Howard generating songs for Howard's productions and Howard presented the song as his own work for several decades. The song was published in 1909 and was first introduced in the 1909 musical The Prince of To-Night, when it was performed by Henry Woodruff.

Early popular recordings were by Henry Burr (1909), Billy Murray (1910) and Manuel Romain (1910). In 1947, "I Wonder Who's Kissing Her Now" was used as the title song of a movie about Joseph E. Howard, leading to renewed popularity for the song. At this time, Orlob brought suit to declare himself the composer, eventually reaching an out-of-court settlement with Howard for the two of them to receive joint credit. Orlob did not claim royalties.

== Other versions ==
- Bing Crosby – in the film The Star Maker (1939).
- June Haver and others in the film I Wonder Who's Kissing Her Now (1947)
- Perry Como with Ted Weems' Orchestra – a 1939 recording which reached the No. 2 position in the Billboard charts in 1947. Como recorded the song again on May 29, 1947.
- Danny Kaye – recorded for Decca Records (catalog No. 24110) on June 15, 1947.
- Ray Noble and His Orchestra (vocal by Snooky Lanson and the Sportsmen) – reached the No. 11 position in the Billboard charts in 1947.
- Dinning Sisters – their version briefly charted in 1947.
- Ray Charles – a single release (1951) (Ray Charles discography)
- Henri Salvador - in a French translation by Henri Christiné titled Malgré tes serments (1957)
- Crazy Otto released a version of the song on his 1958 EP Crazy Otto International, Vol. 2. as part of medley with the songs "Manhattan" and "Dungaree Doll".
- Michael Holliday – a single release, recorded November 4, 1960.
- Bobby Darin – The Unreleased Capitol Sides (1964).
- Dean Martin – for his album Sittin' on Top of the World (1973)
- Harry Nilsson - for his album A Little Touch of Schmilsson in the Night (1973)
- George Hamilton IV – his single reached No.81 in the US Country charts in 1977.
- Anne Murray (as "I Wonder Who's Kissing Him Now") – for her album I'll Be Seeing You (2004)
- Freddy Breck & Dave Cumberland Orchestra - from his album Years of Love (1974)

== Lyrics ==
You have loved lots of girls in the sweet long ago.
And each one has meant heaven to you.
You have vowed your affection to each one in turn.
And have sworn to them all you'd be true.
You have kissed neath the moon while the world seemed in tune.
Then you left her to hunt a new game.
Has it ever occurred to you lately, my boy?
That she's probably doing the same.

Chorus
I wonder who's kissing her now.
Wonder who's teaching her now.
Wonder who's looking into her eyes.
Breathing sighs, telling lies.
I wonder who's buying the wine.
For lips that I used to call mine.
Wonder if she ever tells him of me.
I wonder who's kissing her now.

If you want to feel wretched and lonesome and blue.
Just imagine the girl you loved best.
In the arms of some fellow who's stealing a kiss.
From the lips that you once fondly pressed.
But the world moves apace and the loves of today.
Flit away with a smile and a tear.
So you never can tell who is kissing her now.
Or just whom you'll be kissing next year.

Chorus
