= I Wonder Who's Kissing Her Now (film) =

1947 film by June Haver, George Jessel, Lloyd Bacon, Lewis R. Foster

- Directed by: Lloyd Bacon
- Written by: Marion Turk
- Screenplay by: Lewis R. Foster
- Produced by: George Jessel
- Starring: June Haver; Mark Stevens; Martha Stewart
- Cinematography: Ernest Palmer
- Edited by: Louis R. Loeffler
- Music by: David Buttolph; Alfred Newman
- Color process: Technicolor
- Production company: 20th Century Fox
- Distributed by: 20th Century Fox
- Release date: August 1947
- Running time: 104 minutes
- Country: United States
- Language: English
- Box office: $3.2 million (US rentals)

I Wonder Who's Kissing Her Now is a 1947 American historical musical film directed by Lloyd Bacon and starring June Haver, Mark Stevens and Martha Stewart. I Wonder Who's Kissing Her Now is a biographical film about Joseph E. Howard, the "writer" of the popular song of the same title. Produced and distributed by 20th Century Fox, it was shot in Technicolor.

== Plot ==
Set in the turn of the 20th century, the film focuses on Joseph E. Howard, an aspiring songwriter who happily sells a song to performer Lulu Madison, who later takes sole credit for the writing. He angrily confronts her, but she distracts him by seducing him in her hotel suite. Thinking that she can use Joe's talent for her career, she invites him to serve as her personal piano player on her tour. He accepts her invitation and bids farewell to Katie, the young niece of his guardian John McCullem who reluctantly says goodbye.

Over the following period, Joe grows to become a successful songwriter. Katie follows him to Philadelphia and joins the tour by lying, saying that her uncle has died. Katie's presence distracts Joe, much to Lulu's anger and jealousy. Although Lulu makes sure it obvious to Katie she is not happy about her presence, Katie remains unaffected and continues supporting Joe in his career, rather than working for Lulu. One evening, Lulu tries to cancel Joe's performance, and Katie responds by ruining Lulu's costume, thus making it possible for Joe to perform his latest song, which is received with wild applause.

After being fired by Lulu, Joe and Katie form their own group, working for producers Karl and Kassel. However, Joe is later seduced by attractive performer Fritzi Barrington to work for her. They are successful, but their collaboration proves short-lived, as Fritzi's financial supporter, a flame from the past, is jealous of Joe's connection to her and withdraws. Joe and Fritzi are able to perform a show, though, and it proves to be a major success. They eventually make their debut on Broadway and work together for a while, until Fritzi retires to marry Martin Webb.

Joe, feeling betrayed, blames Katie for scaring away Fritzi, as Katie is her understudy in the show. Sometime later, Joe finds out Katie is working under the stage name Pat O'Dare, performing 'I Wonder Who's Kissing Her Now', an unpublished song by Joe. Katie is surprised to see him, and they eventually kiss each other.

== Cast ==
- June Haver as Katie McCullem
- Mark Stevens as Joseph E. Howard
- Martha Stewart as Lulu Madison
- Reginald Gardiner as Will Hough
- Lenore Aubert as Fritzi Barrington
- William Frawley as Jim Mason
- Gene Nelson as Tommy Yale
- Truman Bradley as Martin Webb
- George Cleveland as John McCullem
- Florence O'Brien as Marie, Fritzi's Maid (uncredited)

== Production ==
The film's working title was Hello, My Baby after the Howard tune "Hello! Ma Baby". Producers Fred Finklehoffe and George Jessel worked on a screenplay on Joseph E. Howard's life for the first time between June and September 1945. Darryl F. Zanuck was unsatisfied and demanded rewrites. In October 1945, he advised the role of Katie be written into the film, with June Haver already in mind.

Originally, Celeste Holm was set to play Lulu Madison. She later withdrew for maternity leave and was replaced by Martha Stewart. Furthermore, newcomer Jean Peters was cast in a role, supposing to play an "ugly duckling", supported by "artificial freckles and hornrimmed glasses". Although the role of Katie was written with June Haver in mind, it was initially offered to Linda Darnell in July 1946, who rejected it, because she felt it was "ill-suited" for her.
