= Frankie Laine discography =

The following is a discography of singles and albums recorded by American singer Frankie Laine.

== Studio albums ==
Labels and catalog numbers refer to the release in the US. Exceptions include Philips, Hallmark, Polydor, Embassy and Warwick, released in the UK and not the US. Albums not released in the US or UK have not been included. Where there is a mono and stereo release, both catalog numbers are shown.

=== Mercury years ===
The Mercury 1949–1952 long-playing records (LPs) were 10" diameter. They mainly just compiled songs already available as 78-r.p.m. sides, but that was common practice at the time, so all of them are listed here as regular albums and not as compilations, regardless whether they contain some previously unreleased material or not.

Year	Title	Label	Catalog number	Peak chart positions	
Year	Title	Label	Catalog number	UK	US
1947	Frankie Laine Sings	Mercury	A22 (3×10", 78 r.p.m., 3×7", 45 r.p.m.)	—	
1949	Frankie Laine Favorites	Mercury	MG 25007	—	
1950	Songs from the Heart	Mercury	MG 25024	—	
1950	Frankie Laine	Mercury	MG 25025	—	
1950	Frankie Laine	Mercury	MG 25026	—	
1950	Frankie Laine	Mercury	MG 25027	—	
1950	Christmas Favorites (v.a., with Vic Damone and Eddy Howard)	Mercury	MG 25082	—	
1951	Mr. Rhythm Sings	Mercury	MG 25097	—	
1951	Song Favourites by Frankie Laine a.k.a. Songs by Frankie Laine	Mercury	MG 25098	—	
1951	Sunny Side of the Street (v.a., with Billy Daniels)	Mercury	MG 25100	—	
1952	Music, Maestro, Please a.k.a. Listen to Laine	Mercury	MG 25124	—	
1955	With All My Heart	Mercury	MG 20105 (12")	—	

=== Columbia years ===
Year	Title	Label	Catalog number	Peak chart positions	
Year	Title	Label	Catalog number	UK	US
1952	One for My Baby	Columbia	CL 6200 (10")	—	
1953	A Musical Portrait of New Orleans (with Jo Stafford)	Columbia	CL 6268 (10")	—	
1954	Mr. Rhythm (Note: With Paul Weston and His Orchestra) (Note: Features Carl Fischer on piano)	Columbia	CL 6278 (10")	—	—
1956	Jazz Spectacular (Note: With Buck Clayton and His Orchestra featuring J.J. Johnson and Kai Winding)	Columbia	CL 808	—	—
1956	Frankie Laine and the Four Lads (with the Four Lads)	Columbia	CL 861	—	—
1957	Rockin'	Columbia	CL 975	—	13
1958	Foreign Affair (Note: With Michael Legrand and His Orchestra)	Columbia	CL 1116	—	—
1958	Torchin' (Note: Orchestra conducted by Frank Comstock. Credited on "A Cottage for Sale" as Frank Comstock and His Orchestra)	Columbia	CL 1176 / CS 8024	—	—
1959	Reunion in Rhythm (with Michel Legrand)	Columbia	CL 1277 / CS 8087	—	—
1959	You Are My Love	Columbia	CL 1317 / CS 8119	—	—
1959	Frankie Laine, Balladeer	Columbia	CL 1393 / CS 8188	—	—
1961	Hell Bent for Leather! (Note: Orchestra conducted by Johnny Williams. "A Wedded Man" and "We'll Be Together Again" credited as Johnny Williams and His Orchestra)	Columbia	CL 1615 / CS 8629	7	71
1961	Deuces Wild	Columbia	CL 1696 / CS 8496	—	—
1962	Call of the Wild	Columbia	CL 1829 / CS 8629	—	—
1963	Wanderlust	Columbia	CL 1962 / CS 8762	—	—

=== Capitol years ===
Year	Title	Label	Catalog number	Peak chart positions	
Year	Title	Label	Catalog number	UK	US
1965	I Believe (Note: Arranged and conducted by Ralph Carmichael)	Capitol	T 2277 / ST 2277	—	—

=== ABC years ===
Year	Title	Label	Catalog number	Peak chart positions	
Year	Title	Label	Catalog number	UK	US
1967	I'll Take Care of Your Cares (Note: Arranged and conducted by Peter DeAngelis)	ABC	ABC 604 / ABCS 604	—	16
1967	I Wanted Someone to Love	ABC	ABC 608 / ABCS 608	—	162
1968	To Each His Own (Note: Orchestra arranged and conducted by Ray Barr) (Note: Arranged and conducted by Sid Feller)	ABC	ABC 628 / ABCS 628	—	127
1968	Take Me Back to Laine Country (with the California Dreamers)	ABC	ABC 657 / ABCS 657	—	—
1969	You Gave Me a Mountain (Note: With the Jimmy Bowen Orchestra)	ABC	ABCS 682	—	55

=== Amos years ===
Year	Title	Label	Catalog number	Peak chart positions	
Year	Title	Label	Catalog number	UK	US
1971	A Brand New Day	Amos	AAS 7013	—	—

=== Polydor, etc. years ===
Year	Title	Label	Catalog number	Peak chart positions	
Year	Title	Label	Catalog number	UK	US
1977	20 Memories in Gold (re-recorded songs) (Note: Arranged and conducted by Pete Moore)	Polydor	2383 457	—	—
1978	Life is Beautiful	Polydor	2383 488	—	—
1985	Place in Time	Score	FLP-102	—	—
1986	Round-Up (Note: With Erich Kunzel and the Cincinnati Pops Orchestra)	Telarc	CD-80141	—	—
1988	New Directions	Score	FLC 2002	—	—
1994	Reunion in Jazz	Score	SRCD 5194	—	—
1998	The Wheels of a Dream	Touchwood	TWCD 2020	—	—
1998	It Ain't Over 'til It's Over	In-Sight! Music Productions	n/a	—	—
2002	The Story of Old Man Jazz and His Loves	Score	22107	—	—
2003	The Nashville Connection	Score	3442	—	—
"—" denotes releases that did not chart or were not released

== Compilation albums ==
Year	Title	Label	Catalog number	Peak chart positions
Year	Title	Label	Catalog number	UK
1954	The Voice of Your Choice	Philips	BBR 8014 (Europe and Aus.)	—
1955	Command Performance	Columbia	CL 625	—
1955	Songs by Frankie Laine	Mercury	MG 20069	—
1955	Lovers' Laine	Columbia	CL 2504	—
1955	That's My Desire	Mercury	MG 20080	—
1955	Frankie Laine Sings for Us	Mercury	MG 20083	—
1955	Concert Date	Mercury	MG 20085	—
1956	One for My Baby	Columbia	CL 2548	—
1957	Frankie Laine Sings His All Time Favourites	Mercury Wing	MGW 12110	—
1958	Frankie Laine's Greatest Hits	Columbia	CL 1231	—
1958	Frankie Laine's Greatest Hits	Mercury	SRW 16349	—
1959	Singing the Blues	Mercury Wing	MGW 12158	—
1960	Frankie Laine's Golden Hits	Mercury	SR 60587	—
1964	The Roving Gambler	Harmony	HL 7329 / HS 11129	—
1966	That's My Desire	Harmony	HL 7382 / HS 11182	—
1967	Memories	Harmony	HL 7425 / HS 11225	—
1967	Memories of Frankie Laine's Greatest Hits	Mercury Wing	MGW 12349 / SRW 16349	—
1968	Memory Laine	Tower	T 5092 / ST 5092	—
1969	I'm Gonna Live 'till I Die	Harmony	HS 11345	—
1969	The Greatest Years	Wing	PKW2 111	—
1971	High Noon	Harmony	H 30406	—
1973	Twenty Incredible Performances	ABC	ABCX 790	—
1974	The Frankie Laine Collection	Hallmark	PDA 016	—
1976	The ABC Collection	ABC	AC 30001	—
1977	American Legend – 16 Greatest Hits	Embassy	CBS 31599	—
1977	The Very Best of Frankie Laine	Warwick	PR 5032	7
1983	So Ultra Rare	Score	FLP 101	—
1983	The Uncollected 1947	Hindsight	HSR 198	—
1985	The Uncollected Vol. 2 1947	Hindsight	HSR 216	—
1986	His Greatest Hits	Warwick	WW 2014	—
1989	Portrait of a Song Stylist	The Harmony Collection	HARCD 102	—
1989	16 Most Requested Songs	Columbia	CK 45029	—
1991	The Frankie Laine Collection – The Mercury Years	Mercury	314 510 435-2	—
1993	The Essence of Frankie Laine	Columbia	CK 53573	—
1993	Frankie Laine and Friends	Prestige	PRCDSP301	—
1996	The Very Best of (ABC Years)	Taragon	TARCD 1017	—
1997	The Original Recordings	Columbia	485124 9	—
1997	High Noon – 20 Greatest Hits	Remember	5682	—
1999	The European Concert	Score	N/A	—
2001	The Platinum Collection	Start	PC 634	—
2001	Setting the Standard: The Complete Transcription Recordings	Jasmine	JASCD 385	—
2004	The Frankie Laine Collection	Sony Music	5150562	—
2005	50 Legendary Recordings	Musical Memories	RG2CD 9006	—
2006	The Golden Years	Living Era	CD AJS 2010	—
2007	That Lucky Old Sun – Essential Collection	Dynamic	DYN 3542	—
2008	American Legend Vol. 1	American Legends	ALE 192060	—
2008	American Legend Vol. 2	American Legends	ALE 192061	—
2011	That's My Desire – His 55 Finest 1946–1958	Retrospective	RTS 4152	—
2011	Hits	Sony Music	88697926302	16
2016	The Hits Collection 1947–61	Acrobat	ACTRCD9060	—
"—" denotes releases that did not chart or were not released

== Singles ==
Accompanying vocalists are shown with each song where applicable. Otherwise, accompanying orchestra, chorus and any other details are shown in footnotes. Not included are re-releases (unless they charted higher than the original release) and records that were not released in the US or UK, unless they charted in the countries below. David Kent's Australian retrospective charts only start weekly in 1950. Belgium's Ultratop Flanders chart began in December 1954. The UK chart began in November 1952. The US Billboard Easy Listening (Adult Contemporary) chart began in July 1961.

Year	Single		Label	Peak chart positions					Gold Record
Year	A-side	B-side	Label	AUS	BE (FLA)	UK	US	US AC	Gold Record
1945	"Melancholy Madeline" (Note: By Oscar Moore with Johnny Moore's Three Blazers. Laine only provides vocals on "Melancholy Madeline")	"Fugue in C Major"	Atlas	—	—	—	—	—	
1945	"That's Liberty"	"In the Wee Small Hours"	Bel-Tone	—	—	—	—	—	
1946	"Ain't That Just Like a Woman" (Note: With Mannie Klein's All Stars)	"September in the Rain"	Mercury	—	—	—	—	—	
1946	"That's My Desire"	"By the River Sainte Marie"	Mercury	—	—	—	4 —	—	*
1947	"Texas and Pacific" (Note: By Jerry Gray and His Orchestra. Laine (along with Smart Set) only provide vocals on "Texas Pacific")	"Anvil Chorus"	Mercury	—	—	—	—	—	
1947	"A Sunday Kind of Love" (Note: With Carl Fischer's Orchestra. Also credited on some records as Carl Fischer and His Orchestra, Carl Fischer's Swingtet and Carl Fischer's Poets of Rhythm)	"Who Cares What People Say"	Mercury	—	—	—	—	—	
1947	"I May Be Wrong" (Note: With Milton DeLugg and the Swing Wing)	"Stay as Sweet as You Are"	Mercury	—	—	—	—	—	
1947	"Wrap Your Troubles in Dreams"	"Black and Blue"	Mercury	—	—	—	— 27	—	
1947	"On the Sunny Side of the Street"	"Blue Turning Grey over You"	Mercury	—	—	—	—	—	
1947	"West End Blues"	"I Can't Believe That You're in Love with Me"	Mercury	—	—	—	—	—	
1947	"Mam'selle" (Note: With Harry Geller and His Orchestra)	"All of Me"	Mercury	—	—	—	14 —	—	
1947	"Heartaches" (Note: With Sam Furman's Orchestra. Smart Set also provide vocals on "It Ain't Gonna Be Like That")	"Confessin'"	Atlas	—	—	—	—	—	
1947	"Baby, Baby All the Time"	"Someday Sweetheart"	Atlas	—	—	—	—	—	
1947	"Coquette"	"It Ain't Gonna Be Like That"	Atlas	—	—	—	—	—	
1947	"Kiss Me Again"	"By the Lights of the Stars"	Mercury	—	—	—	—	—	
1947	"Two Lovers Have I"	"Put Yourself in My Place Baby"	Mercury	—	—	—	21	—	
1947	"Oh! Lady Be Good" (Note: With Paul Dunlap Orchestra)	"You Can Depend on Me"	Atlas	—	—	—	—	—	
1947	"Shine"	"We'll Be Together Again"	Mercury	—	—	—	9 —	—	*
1948	"I've Only Myself to Blame"	"But Beautiful"	Mercury	—	—	—	—	—	
1948	"I'm Looking Over a Four Leaf Clover"	"Monday Again"	Mercury	—	—	—	— 24	—	
1948	"That Ain't Right"	"May I Never Love Again"	Mercury	—	—	—	20 —	—	
1948	"Baby Don't Be Mad at Me"	"Put 'em in a Box, Tie 'em with a Ribbon"	Mercury	—	—	—	—	—	
1948	"Moonlight in Vermont"	"Roses of Picardy"	Atlas	—	—	—	—	—	
1948	"When You're Smiling"	"All of Me"	Mercury	—	—	—	—	—	
1948	"Ah, But It Happens"	"Hold Me"	Mercury	—	—	—	21 —	—	
1948	"Singing the Blues"	"Thanks for You"	Mercury	—	—	—	—	—	
1948	"Blue Moments"	"Sometimes I'm Happy"	Atlas	—	—	—	—	—	
1948	"Tara Talara Tala"	"You're All I Want for Christmas"	Mercury	—	—	—	— 11	—	
1948	"Tara Talara Tala"	"Old Fashioned Love"	Mercury	—	—	—	—	—	
1948	"Rosetta"	"It Only Happens Once"	Mercury	—	—	—	—	—	
1949	"Don't Have to Tell Nobody"	"I Wish You Were Jealous of Me"	Mercury	—	—	—	—	—	
1949	"Sweet Talk"	"September in the Rain"	Mercury	—	—	—	—	—	
1949	"Georgia on My Mind"	"You're Just the Kind"	Mercury	—	—	—	—	—	
1949	"Nevertheless (I'm in Love with You)"	"Be Bop Spoken Here"	Mercury	—	—	—	—	—	
1949	"Now That I Need You"	"My Own–My Only–My All"	Mercury	—	—	—	20 —	—	
1949	"That Lucky Old Sun"	"I Get Sentimental Over Nothing"	Mercury	2 —	—	—	1 —	—	*
1949	"Waiting at the End of the Road"	"Don't Do Something to Someone Else"	Mercury	—	—	—	—	—	
1949	"Mule Train" (Note: Credited as Frankie Laine and the Muleskinners)	"Carry Me Back to Old Virginney"	Mercury	3 —	—	—	1 —	—	*
1949	"God Bless the Child"	"Don't Cry Little Children Don't Cry"	Mercury	—	—	—	—	—	
1949	"Satan Wears a Satin Gown" (with the Jud Conlon Rhythmaires)	"Baby Just for Me"	Mercury	—	—	—	28 —	—	
1950	"The Cry of the Wild Goose"	"Black Lace"	Mercury	5 —	—	—	1 —	—	*
1950	"Swamp Girl"	"(Give Me) A Kiss for Tomorrow"	Mercury	—	—	—	12 —	—	
1950	"Stars and Stripes Forever"	"Thanks for Your Kisses"	Mercury	—	—	—	20 —	—	
1950	"If I Were You Baby, I'd Love Me" (with Patti Page)	"I Love You for That" (with Patti Page)	Mercury	—	—	—	—	—	
1950	"Exactly Like You"	"You're Wonderful"	Mercury	—	—	—	—	—	
1950	"Music, Maestro, Please"	"Dream a Little Dream of Me"	Mercury	—	—	—	13 18	—	
1950	"Nevertheless"	"I Was Dancing With Someone (But I Was Looking at You)"	Mercury	—	—	—	11 —	—	
1950	"If I Were a Bell"	"Sleepy Ol' River"	Mercury	—	—	—	30 —	—	
1950	"A Man Gets Awfully Lonesome"	"I'm Gonna Live ‘Til I Die"	Mercury	—	—	—	—	—	
1950	"Merry Christmas Everywhere"	"What Am I Gonna Do This Christmas?"	Mercury	—	—	—	—	—	
1951	"May the Lord Bless and Keep You (with the Jud Conlon Singers)	"Dear, Dear, Dear" (with the Jud Conlon Singers)	Mercury	—	—	—	—	—	
1951	"Metro Polka"	"The Jalopy Song" (with the Jud Conlon Singers)	Mercury	—	—	—	19 —	—	
1951	"Jezebel" (Note: With The Norman Luboff Choir) (Note: With Mitch Miller and His Orchestra)	"Rose, Rose, I Love You"	Columbia	12 3	—	—	2 3	—	*
1951	"Pretty Eyed Baby" (with Jo Stafford)	"That's the One for Me" (with Jo Stafford)	Columbia	17 —	—	—	13 —	—	
1951	"The Gang That Sang Heart Out of My Heart"	"You Left Me Out in the Rain"	Mercury	—	—	—	—	—	
1951	"That's Good! That's Bad!" (with Jo Stafford)	"In the Cool, Cool, Cool of the Evening" (with Jo Stafford)	Columbia	— 2	—	—	— 17	—	
1951	"The Day Isn't Long Enough"	"Isle of Capri"	Mercury	—	—	—	—	—	
1951	"The Girl in the Wood"	"Wonderful, Wasn't It"	Columbia	—	—	11 —	23 17	—	
1951	"Hey Good Lookin'" (with Jo Stafford)	"Gambella (The Gamblin' Lady)" (with Jo Stafford)	Columbia	15 11	—	—	9 19	—	
1951	"Get Happy"	"I Would Do Most Anything for You"	Mercury	—	—	—	—	—	
1951	"Jealousy (Jalousie)"	"Flamenco"	Columbia	9 —	—	—	3 —	—	*
1951	"Tomorrow Mountain"	"One for My Baby (And One More for the Road)"	Columbia	—	—	—	—	—	
1951	"Song of the Islands (Na Lei O Hawaii)"	"Necessary Evil"	Columbia	—	—	—	—	—	
1951	"(She Walks Like You – She Talks Like You) She Reminds Me of You"	"Love Is Such a Cheat" (with the Ryerson Guitars)	Columbia	—	—	—	—	—	
1951	"To Be Worthy of You"	"When It's Sleepy Time Down South"	Columbia	—	—	—	—	—	
1952	"Baby, I Need You"	"Yes, My Dear"	Mercury	—	—	—	—	—	
1952	"The Gandy Dancer's Ball"	"When You're in Love"	Columbia	4 —	—	—	21 30	—	
1952	"Hambone" (with Jo Stafford)	"Let's Have a Party" (with Jo Stafford)	Columbia	—	—	—	6 —	—	
1952	"Snow in Lover's Lane"	"That’s How It Goes"	Columbia	—	—	—	—	—	
1952	"How Lovely Cooks the Meat" (with Doris Day)	"Sugarbush" (with Doris Day)	Columbia	— 9	—	— 8	— 7	—	*
1952	"High Noon (Do Not Forsake Me)" (Note: With Jimmy Carroll and His Orchestra)	"Rock of Gibraltar"	Columbia	3 2	—	7 —	5 20	—	*
1952	"There's a Rainbow 'Round My Shoulder" (Note: With Percy Faith and His Orchestra)	"She's Funny That Way"	Columbia	—	—	—	—	—	
1952	"South of the Border (Down Mexico Way)"	"All of Me"	Mercury	—	—	—	—	—	
1952	"The Mermaid"	"The Ruby and the Pearl"	Columbia	— 14	—	—	—	—	
1952	"Tonight We're Setting the Woods on Fire" (with Jo Stafford)	"Piece a-Puddin'" (with Jo Stafford)	Columbia	20 —	—	—	21 —	—	
1952	"Christmas Roses"	"Chow, Willy" (with Jo Stafford)	Columbia	—	—	—	— 25	—	
1952	"Tonight You Belong to Me"	"I'm Just a Poor Bachelor"	Columbia	— 14	—	—	28 14	—	
1953	"I Believe"	"Your Cheatin' Heart"	Columbia	3 8	—	1 —	2 18	—	*
1953	"Tell Me a Story" (with Jimmy Boyd)	"The Little Boy and the Old Man" (with Jimmy Boyd)	Columbia	1 —	—	5 —	4 24	—	
1953	"That's How Rhythm Was Born"	"Ain't Misbehavin'"	Mercury	—	—	—	—	—	
1953	"Ramblin' Man"	"I Let Her Go"	Columbia	—	—	—	— 27	—	
1953	"Where the Winds Blow"	"Te Amo" (Note: Features Bobby Hackett on trumpet)	Columbia	—	—	2 —	—	—	
1953	"Hey Joe!"	"Sittin' in the Sun (Countin' My Money)"	Columbia	14 —	—	1 —	6 —	—	
1953	"Let's Go Fishin'" (with Jimmy Boyd)	"Poor Little Piggy Bank" (with Jimmy Boyd)	Columbia	—	—	—	—	—	
1953	"Answer Me, Lord Above (Mutterlein)"	"Blowing Wild (The Ballad of Black Gold)"	Columbia	1 —	—	1 2	24 21	—	
1953	"Way Down Yonder in New Orleans" (with Jo Stafford)	"Floatin' Down to Cotton Town" (with Jo Stafford)	Columbia	—	—	—	26 —	—	
1953	"Granada"	"I'd Give My Life"	Columbia	11 —	—	9 —	17 —	—	
1954	"The Kid's Last Fight"	"Long Distance Love"	Columbia	18 —	—	3 —	20 —	—	
1954	"Going Like Wildfire" (with Jo Stafford)	"Rollin' Down the Line" (with Jo Stafford)	Columbia	—	—	—	—	—	
1954	"Some Day"	"There Must Be a Reason"	Columbia	—	18 —	— 9	14 —	—	
1954	"My Friend"	"The Lord Don't Treat His Chillun That Way"	Philips	—	—	3 —	—	—	
1954	"Rain, Rain, Rain" (with the Four Lads) (Note: With the Buddy Cole Quartet)	"Your Heart – My Heart"	Columbia	—	—	8 —	21 28	—	
1954	"Old Shoes"	"In the Beginning"	Columbia	—	9 —	— 20	—	—	
1954	"High Society" (with Jo Stafford)	"Back Where I Belong" (with Jo Stafford)	Columbia	—	—	—	—	—	
1955	"Bubbles" (with the Mellomen)	"The Tarrier Song"	Columbia	—	—	—	—	—	
1955	"Strange Lady in Town"	"Cool Water" (with the Mellomen)	Columbia	36 6	— 9	6 2	—	—	
1955	"Humming Bird"	"My Little One"	Columbia	4 —	— 6	16 —	17 —	—	
1955	"Hawk-Eye" (Note: With Ray Conniff and His Orchestra)	"Your Love"	Columbia	—	—	7 —	73 —	—	
1955	"A Woman in Love"	"Walking the Night Away" (with the Mellomen)	Columbia	5 35	5 —	1 —	19 —	—	
1955	"I Heard the Angels Singing" (with the Four Lads)	"Ain't It a Pity and a Shame" (with the Four Lads)	Columbia	—	—	—	—	—	
1955	"Sixteen Tons" (with the Mellomen)	"I Heard the Angels Singing" (with the Four Lads)	Columbia	1 —	17 —	10 —	—	—	
1956	"Robin Hood" (with the Starlighters)	"Champion, the Wonder Horse"	Columbia	20 —	—	—	—	—	
1956	"Hell Hath No Fury" (Note: Orchestra and Chorus directed by Georgie Stoll)	"The Most Happy Fella"	Columbia	—	—	28 —	—	—	
1956	"Moby Dick" (with the Starlighters) (Note: With Paul Weston and His Music from Hollywood)	"A Capital Ship" (Note: With Ray Carter Orchestra)	Columbia	—	—	—	—	—	
1956	"Don't Cry" (with the Mellomen)	"Ticky Ticky Tick (I'm Gonna Tell on You)"	Columbia	—	—	—	83 —	—	
1956	"The Thief"	"Make Me a Child Again"	Columbia	—	—	—	—	—	
1956	"On the Road to Mandalay"	"Only If We Love"	Columbia	29 —	—	—	—	—	
1956	"Moonlight Gambler"	"Lotus Land"	Columbia	6 —	—	13 —	3 —	—	
1957	"Love is a Golden Ring" (with the Easy Riders)	"There's Not a Moment to Spare"	Columbia	9 —	—	19 —	23 —	—	
1957	"Gunfight at the O. K. Corral"	"Without Him"	Columbia	39 —	—	—	—	—	
1957	"The 3:10 to Yuma"	"You Know How It Is" (Note: With Ray Ellis and His Orchestra)	Columbia	—	—	—	—	—	
1957	"Up Above My Head (I Hear Music in the Air)" (with Johnnie Ray)	"Good Evening Friends" (with Johnnie Ray)	Columbia	49 48	18 —	25	—	—	
1957	"East Is East"	"The Greater Sin"	Columbia	—	—	—	—	—	
1958	"Annabel Lee" (Note: With Al Lerner and His Orchestra)	"All of These – And More" (Note: With Frank De Vol and His Orchestra)	Columbia	—	—	—	—	—	
1958	"My Gal and a Prayer"	"The Lonesome Road"	Columbia	—	—	—	—	—	
1958	"A Kiss Can Change the World"	"Lovin' Up a Storm"	Columbia	—	—	—	—	—	
1958	"Choombala Bey (Tchumbala Bey)"	"I Have to Cry"	Columbia	95 —	—	—	—	—	
1958	"Rawhide"	"Magnificent Obsession"	Columbia	34 —	—	6 —	—	—	
1958	"When I Speak Your Name" (Note: Orchestrated by Richard Hayman)	"A Cottage for Sale"	Columbia	—	—	—	—	—	
1958	"Midnight on a Rainy Monday"	"When I Speak Your Name"	Columbia	—	—	—	—	—	
1959	"That's My Desire"	"In My Wildest Dreams"	Columbia	—	—	—	—	—	
1959	"My Little Love"	"Journey's End"	Columbia	—	—	—	—	—	
1959	"El Diablo"	"The Valley of a Hundred Hills"	Columbia	—	—	—	—	—	
1959	"Rockin' Mother"	"Rock and Gravel (Early in the Mornin')" (Note: With Fred Katz and His Orchestra)	Columbia	—	—	—	—	—	
1960	"Et Voila" (Note: Orchestra conducted by Les Brown)	"St. James Infirmary"	Columbia	—	—	—	—	—	
1960	"Seven Women"	"And Doesn't She Roll"	Columbia	—	—	—	—	—	
1960	"Here She Comes Now"	"Kisses That Shake the World"	Columbia	—	—	—	—	—	
1961	"Gunslinger"	"Wanted Man"	Columbia	—	—	50 —	—	—	
1961	"Miss Satan"	"Ride Through the Night"	Columbia	—	—	—	—	—	
1962	"A Wedded Man"	"We'll Be Together Again"	Columbia	—	—	—	—	—	
1963	"Don't Make My Baby Blue" (Note: Orchestra arranged and conducted by Jack Nitzsche)	"The Moment of Truth"	Columbia	76 —	—	—	51 —	17 —	
1963	"I'm Gonna Be Strong"	"Take Her"	Columbia	—	—	—	—	—	
1964	"Up Among the Stars (Entre les Etoiles)"	"Lonely Days of Winter" (Note: Orchestra arranged and conducted by Shorty Rogers)	Columbia	—	—	—	—	—	
1964	"Go on With Your Dancing" (Note: Orchestra conducted by Pete King)	"Halfway"	Capitol	—	—	—	—	—	
1965	"A Girl" (Note: Arranged and conducted by H. B. Barnum)	"House of Laughter"	Capitol	—	—	—	—	—	
1965	"Seven Days of Love"	"Heartaches Can Be Fun"	Capitol	—	—	—	—	—	
1966	"Pray and He Will Answer"	"The Meaning of It All"	Capitol	—	—	—	—	—	
1966	"Johnny Willow" (Note: Arranged and conducted by Al De Lory)	"What Do You Know"	Capitol	—	—	—	—	—	
1966	"I'll Take Care of Your Cares"	"Ev'ry Street's a Boulevard (In Old New York)" (Note: Orchestra directed by Oliver Nelson)	ABC	—	—	—	39 —	2 —	
1967	"Making Memories"	"The Moment of Truth"	ABC	—	—	—	35 —	2 —	
1967	"You Wanted Someone to Play With (I Wanted Someone to Love)"	"The Real True Meaning of Love"	ABC	—	—	—	48 —	5 —	
1967	"Laura, What's He Got That I Ain't Got"	"Sometimes I Just Can't Stand You"	ABC	86 —	—	—	66 —	23 —	
1967	"You, No One But You"	"Somewhere There's Someone"	ABC	—	—	—	83 —	6 —	
1967	"To Each His Own"	"I'm Happy to Hear You're Sorry"	ABC	—	—	—	82 —	2 —	
1968	"I Don't Want to Set the World on Fire"	"I Found You"	ABC	—	—	—	— 118	26 19	
1968	"Take Me Back" (Note: Arranged and conducted by Artie Butler)	"Forsaking All Others" (with the California Dreamers)	ABC	—	—	—	115 —	18 —	
1968	"Please Forgive Me" (Note: Arranged and conducted by Bill Reddie)	"Pretty Little Princess"	ABC	—	—	—	—	30 —	
1968	"You Gave Me a Mountain"	"The Secret of Happiness"	ABC	83 —	—	—	24 —	1 —	
1969	"Dammit Isn't God's Last Name"	"Fresh Out of Tears"	ABC	—	—	—	86 —	—	
1969	"If I Didn't Believe in You"	"Allegra"	ABC	—	—	—	—	—	
1970	"I Believe" (re-recording)	"On the Sunny Side of the Street" (re-recording)	Amos	—	—	—	—	—	
1970	"Put Your Hand in the Hand"	"Going to Newport"	Amos	—	—	—	—	—	
1971	"My God and I"	"Don't Blame the Child"	Amos	—	—	—	—	—	
1972	"My Own True Love"	"Time to Ride"	Sunflower	—	—	—	—	—	
1974	"Blazing Saddles"	"I'm Tired" (Note: Split single; by Madeline Kahn and Chorus)	Warner Bros.	—	—	—	—	—	
1976	"Talk to Me 'Bout the Hard Times (Part 1)" (Note: With Johnny Harris and His Orchestra)	"Talk to Me 'Bout the Hard Times (Part 2)"	Mainstream	—	—	—	—	—	
1976	"Maxwell's Silver Hammer" (Note: Split single, only released in the UK. Both sides accompanied by the London Symphony Orchestra. "You Never Give Me Your Money" is sung by Lou Reizner and Will Malone)	"You Never Give Me Your Money"	Riva	—	—	—	—	—	
1978	"Send in the Clowns"	"Hey, Hey Jesus"	Polydor	—	—	—	—	—	
1984	"Take Me Back to LA"	"We'll Be Together Again"	Score	—	—	—	—	—	
1985	"San Diego (Lovely Lady By the Sea)" (Note: With the Jimmy Namaro Sextet)	"The Lady Digs Jazz"	Score	—	—	—	—	—	
1986	"(My First) Merry Christmas Without You"	"Old New Orleans"	Score	—	—	—	—	—	
1987	"Old Boston"	"(My First) Merry Christmas Without You"	Score	—	—	—	—	—	
1987	"Old Chicago"	"Old St. Louis"	Score	—	—	—	—	—	
1989	"Rose Ellen"	"Still There's You"	Score	—	—	—	—	—	
1999	"When You Hear the Bells at Christmas" (Note: With the Salvation Army Kids Singers)	"The Power of Music in Every Child's Heart"	N/A	—	—	—	—	—	
"—" denotes releases that did not chart or were not released.
