= Frankie Laine (disambiguation) =

Frankie Laine (1913–2007) was an American singer, songwriter, and actor.

Frankie Laine may also refer to:

- Frankie Laine (1949 album)
- Frankie Laine (1950 album)
- Frankie Laine (wrestler) (1943–2016), Canadian professional wrestler known as Cowboy Frankie Laine

== See also ==
- Frankie Lane (1948–2011), English footballer
