= Frankie Laine (1949 album) =

Studio album by Frankie Laine
- Released: 1949
- Recorded: 1949
- Genre: Vocal
- Label: Mercury

Frankie Laine chronology
| Frankie Laine (1949) | Frankie Laine (Ver 2) (1950) |

Frankie Laine was Frankie Laine's first Mercury Records 10" long-play album, recorded in 1949 and originally planned for release in 1950. However, it came out sooner in 1949, and they were able to include the Frankie Laine hit, "Cry of the Wild Goose."

== Track listing ==
Track listing for Frankie Laine
| Track | Song Title | Originally By |
|---|---|---|
| 1. | God Bless the Child | |
| 2. | The Cry of the Wild Goose | |
| 3. | That Lucky Old Sun | |
| 4. | Wrap Your Troubles in Dreams | Harry Barris, Ted Koehler and Billy Moll |
| 5. | Don't Cry Little Children | |
| 6. | By the Light of the Stars | |
| 7. | Mule Train | |
| 8. | West End Blues | |
