= Frankie Laine's Golden Hits =

Compilation album by Frankie Laine
- Released: 1961
- Label: Mercury

Professional ratings
Review scores
Source	Rating
AllMusic	2/5 stars
Billboard	4/4 stars

Frankie Laine's Golden Hits is a compilation album by Frankie Laine, released in 1961 by Mercury Records.

The album, available both in mono and in stereo, was a remastered compilation of the singer's early hits such as "That Lucky Old Sun", "That's My Desire", "Mule Train", "The Cry of the Wild Goose".

== Track listing ==
Side one
No.	Title	Writer(s)	Length
1.	"That Lucky Old Sun (Just Rolls Around Heaven All Day)"	Beasley Smith; Haven Gillespie	2:53
2.	"The Cry of the Wild Goose"	Terry Gilkyson	2:40
3.	"That's My Desire"	Carroll Loveday; Helmy Kresa	2:45
4.	"Shine"	Cecil Mack; Lew Brown; Ford Dabney	2:50
5.	"Two Loves Have I"	Vincent Scotto; Barry L. Trivers	2:56
6.	"September in the Rain"	Dubin; Warren	2:54

Side two
No.	Title	Writer(s)	Length
1.	"Mule Train"	Lange; Heath; Glickman	2:30
2.	"Music Maestro Please"	Allie Wrubel; Herbert Magidson	2:52
3.	"By the River Sainte Marie"	Edgar Leslie; Harry Warren	2:36
4.	"All of Me"	Seymour Simons; Gerald Marks	2:30
5.	"Mam'selle"	Edmund Goulding; Mack Gordon	2:50
6.	"On the Sunny Side of the Street"	Jimmy McHugh; Dorothy Fields	2:46
