= Balladeer =

Balladeer or The Balladeer may refer to:

- Balladeer, a singer or reciter of ballads
- A Balladeer, a Dutch musical group
- Balladeer (Frankie Laine album)
- The Balladeer, a character in TV series The Dukes of Hazzard voiced by Waylon Jennings
- The Balladeer, a compilation album by Waylon Jennings
- The Balladeer (album), a 2020 album by Lori McKenna
- The Balladeer, the former codename of the Wanderer, a character in 2020 video game Genshin Impact
