= Não tem solução =

Portuguese-language song by Dorival Caymmi and Carlos Guinle

Single by Dorival Caymmi
- Language: Portuguese
- B-side: "Nem Eu"
- Released: 1952
- Genre: Samba-canção
- Label: Odeon
- Songwriter(s): Dorival Caymmi; Carlos Guinle

"Não tem solução" is a 1952 Portuguese-language song, a samba-canção, by Dorival Caymmi and Carlos Guinle. The song was released by Caymmi as a single on Odeon in 1952. Afterwards Dick Farney taught the song to Frankie Laine, who recorded it for his album Foreign Affair in 1958.
