= Frankie Laine (1950 albums) =

Frankie Laine was the title of three self-titled 10-inch albums by Frankie Laine that were simultaneously issued by his label Mercury Records in the summer of 1950.

The LPs compiled previously released sides along with several new productions.

The strongest LP of the three was the third one (cat. nr. MG 25027), compiling Laine's biggest hits like "Lucky Old Sun", "Mule Train", and "Cry of the Wild Goose" and two unreleased tracks – "God Bless the Child" and "Don't Cry, Little Children". The second one (MG 25026) was judged by Billboard as containing "second-string" songs and being released primarily with the intention of "latching onto the coin of [the singer's] large following," and the first (MG 25025) was "the weakest by comparison" with the other two, but was still expected to provide "reasonably sizable returns".

== Track listings ==
=== MG 25025 ===
Frankie Laine

Studio album by Frankie Laine
- Label: Columbia

Frankie Laine chronology
Frankie Laine; Frankie Laine; Frankie Laine (1950)	One for My Baby (1952)

Side one
No.	Title	Length
1.	"Two Loves Have I"
2.	"I May Be Wrong"
3.	"Stay as Sweet as You Are"
4.	"All of Me"

Side two
No.	Title	Length
1.	"Now That I Need You"
2.	"Hold Me"
3.	"Blue Turning Grey over You"
4.	"Old Fashioned Love"

=== MG 25026 ===
Frankie Laine

Studio album by Frankie Laine
- Label: Columbia

Frankie Laine chronology
Frankie Laine; Frankie Laine; Frankie Laine (1950)	One for My Baby (1952)

Side one
No.	Title	Length
1.	"I Get Sentimental over Nothing"
2.	"When You're Smiling"
3.	"Kiss Me Again"
4.	"Satan Wears a Satin Gown"

Side two
No.	Title	Length
1.	"September in the Rain"
2.	"Swamp Girl"
3.	"Black Lace"
4.	"Carry Me Back to Old Virginny"

=== MG 25027 ===
Frankie Laine

Studio album by Frankie Laine
- Label: Columbia

Frankie Laine chronology
Frankie Laine; Frankie Laine; Frankie Laine (1950)	One for My Baby (1952)

Side one
No.	Title	Length
1.	"Don't Cry Little Children"
2.	"Cry of the Wild Goose"
3.	"Wrap Your Troubles in Dreams"
4.	"That Lucky Old Sun"

Side two
No.	Title	Length
1.	"By the Light of the Stars"
2.	"God Bless the Child"
3.	"West End Blues"
4.	"Mule Train"
