= Deuces Wild (disambiguation) =

Deuces Wild is a 2002 American crime drama film.

Deuces Wild may also refer to:

- Deuces Wild (band), a German pop band
- Deuces Wild (B.B. King album), 1997
- Deuces Wild (Frankie Laine album), 1962
- Deuces Wild (Sonny Stitt album), 1966
- Dueces Wild (Vast Aire album), 2008
- A variant of poker and video poker where 2 ("deuce") is a wild card
