= Addormentarmi così =

Italian song

"Addormentarmi così" is a 1948 song written by the Italian lyricist Ornella Ferrari, to music by Vittorio Mascheroni for the singer Lidia Martorana with an arrangement of Pippo Barzizza. The lyrics begin: «Addormentarmi così/ fra le tue braccia/ mentre tu mi baci /mi baci sempre più...».

The song is considered an Italian classic and was covered by dozens of artists, including Adriano Celentano, Teddy Reno, Gigliola Cinquetti, Luciano Tajoli, Betty Curtis, Flo Sandon's, Lara Saint Paul. It was introduced to an American audience by Frankie Laine in 1958 in his first album with Michel Legrand, A Foreign Affair.
