= Making Memories =

1967 single by Frankie Laine

Single by Frankie Laine

from the album I'll Take Care of Your Cares
- B-side: "The Moment of Truth"
- Released: April 1967 (U.S.)
- Length: 2:55
- Label: ABC
- Songwriters: Larry Kusik, Eddie Snyder
- Producer: Bob Thiele

Frankie Laine singles chronology
"I'll Take Care of Your Cares" (1967)	"Making Memories" (1967)	"You Wanted Someone to Play With (I Wanted Someone to Love)" (1967)

"Making Memories" is a song originally recorded by Frankie Laine in 1967. It became a U.S. Top 40 hit, reaching #35, and an Easy Listening hit, peaking at #2.

== Chart history ==
Chart (1967)	Peak position
Canada RPM Top Singles	29
US Billboard Hot 100	35
US Billboard Easy Listening	2
US Cash Box Top 100	41
