= Makin' Memories =

Makin' Memories may refer to:

- Makin' Memories (album), a 1969 album by Dottie West
- "Makin' Memories" (song), a song by the Sherman Brothers
- "Making Memories", a song originally recorded by Frankie Laine in 1967
