= Torchin' =

Studio album by Frankie Laine
- Released: 1958
- Genre: Pop
- Label: Columbia

Frankie Laine chronology
Foreign Affair (1958)	Torchin' (1958)	Reunion in Rhythm (1959)

Professional ratings
Review scores
Source	Rating
AllMusic	2.5/5 stars

Torchin' is a studio album by Frankie Laine released in 1958 on Columbia Records.

== Track listing ==
Side one
No.	Title	Writer(s)	Length
1.	"A Cottage for Sale"	Conley; Robison
2.	"Torchin'"	Frankie Laine; Al Lerner
3.	"I Cover the Waterfront"	E. Heyman; J. W. Green
4.	"Here Lies Love"	Leo Robin; Ralph Rainger
5.	"You've Changed"	Carey; Fischer
6.	"Midnight on a Rainy Monday"		Eugster

Side two
No.	Title	Writer(s)	Length
1.	"I Get Along Without You Very Well"	Carmichael
2.	"It's the Talk of the Town"	Symes; Neiburg; Livingston
3.	"These Foolish Things (Remind Me of You)"	Marvell; Strachey; Link
4.	"I Got It Bad (and That Ain't Good)"	P. Webster; D. Ellington
5.	"It Only Happens Once"	Frankie Laine
6.	"Body and Soul"	E. Heyman; Sour; Eyton; J. W. Green
