= Hell Bent for Leather! =

Studio album by Frankie Laine
- Released: c. October 1961
- Genre: Western
- Length: 30:11
- Label: Columbia
- Producer: None listed

Frankie Laine chronology
Frankie Laine, Balladeer (1959)	Hell Bent for Leather! (1961)	Deuces Wild (1961)

Professional ratings
Review scores
Source	Rating
AllMusic	4.5/5 stars
Billboard	4/4 stars

Hell Bent for Leather! is a studio album by Frankie Laine released in 1961 on Columbia Records, featuring contemporary western songs. The instrumental and vocal accompaniments were arranged by John Williams.

== Track listing ==
Side one
No.	Title	Writer(s)	Length
1.	"Wanted Man"	Bob Hilliard; L. Pockriss	2:37
2.	"High Noon (Do Not Forsake Me)"		2:24
3.	"Gunfight at O.K. Corral"		2:09
4.	"Bowie Knife"		2:54
5.	"Along the Navajo Trail"		2:30
6.	"The Cry of the Wild Goose"		2:54

Side two
No.	Title	Writer(s)	Length
1.	"Rawhide"		2:00
2.	"City Boy"		2:39
3.	"Cool Water"	B. Nolan	2:50
4.	"The 3:10 to Yuma"		2:25
5.	"The Hanging Tree"	M. David; J. Livingston	2:17
6.	"Mule Train"	J. Lange; H. Heath; F. Glickman	2:32

== Charts ==
Chart (1961)	Peak position
UK Albums (OCC)	7
U.S. Billboard Top LP's — 150 Best Selling Monaural LP's	71
