= That's Good, That's Bad =

That's Good, That's Bad may refer to:

- That's Good, That's Bad (Desperate Housewives)
- That's Good, That's Bad, children's book by Margery Cuyler
- That's Good, That's Bad (Frankie Laine song), Laine, Jo Stafford 1951
- "That's Good, That's Bad", song by George Jones, composed by Ervin Drake, Jimmy Shirl 1951
- "That's Good, That's Bad", comedy sketch by Archie Campbell, performed by Homer and Jethro, Chet Atkins 1960
