= Frankie Laine's Greatest Hits =

Compilation album by Frankie Laine
- Released: 1958
- Label: Columbia

Frankie Laine chronology
Rockin' (1957)	Frankie Laine's Greatest Hits (1958)	Foreign Affair (1958)

Professional ratings
Review scores
Source	Rating
AllMusic	4.5/5 stars

Frankie Laine's Greatest Hits is a compilation album by Frankie Laine released in 1958 on Columbia Records.

In 1962, this monaural album was re-released in an "electronically rechanneled for stereo" version.

== Track listing ==
Side one
No.	Title	Writer(s)	Length
1.	"Moonlight Gambler"	Hilliard; Springer
2.	"Jalousie"	V. Bloom; Gade
3.	"High Noon (Do Not Forsake Me)" (from Stanlay Kramer's prod. High Noon)	Washington; Tiomkin
4.	"Your Cheatin' Heart"	H. Williams
5.	"Some Day" (from Vagabond King)	Hooker; Friml
6.	"I Believe"	Drake; Graham; Shirl; Stillman

Side two
No.	Title	Writer(s)	Length
1.	"Jezebel"	Shanklin
2.	"Granada"	D. Dodd; Lara
3.	"That Lucky Old Sun"	H. Gillespie; B. Smith
4.	"Rose, Rose, I Love You"	Eng. lyrics: W. Thomas; Arr: C. Langdon
5.	"That's My Desire"	C. Loveday; Kresa
6.	"Answer Me"	C. Sigman; Winkler
