= Dammit Isn't God's Last Name =

1969 song by Frankie Laine

"Dammit Isn't God's Last Name" is a song by Frankie Laine. Released as single in 1969, it peaked at number 86 on the Billboard Hot 100.

== Charts ==
Chart (1967)	Peak position
US Billboard Hot 100	86
