= Ornella Ferrari =

Italian lyricist

Ornella Ferrari (1909–1983), known by the pen name Biri, was a successful female Italian song lyricist from the 1940s to 1970s. She achieved recognition with the song "Addormentarmi così" in 1948. Her entry at the 1951 Sanremo Festival, "La luna si veste d'argento", sung by Achille Togliani and Nilla Pizzi, was accused of partial use of an earlier 1907 poem, despite finishing second.
