= Foreign Affair (Frankie Laine album) =

A Foreign Affair

Studio album by Frankie Laine, Michel Legrand
- Released: 1958
- Genre: Jazz
- Length: 1:00:47
- Label: Columbia

Frankie Laine, Michel Legrand chronology
Frankie Laine's Greatest Hits (1958)	A Foreign Affair (1958)	Torchin (1958)

Foreign Affair is a 1958 album by Frankie Laine with the orchestra of Michel Legrand. High Fidelity commented that "Frankie Laine throbs his breathy way through an international potpourri in five languages — all marked with a heavy American accent." The album was followed by a second collaboration with Legrand the next year, Reunion in Rhythm.

== Track listing ==
1. "Laura" - (David Raksin, Johnny Mercer)
2. "Mam'selle"
3. "Addormentarmi Cosi"
4. "Autumn Leaves{ - (Joseph Kosma, Jacques Prévert)
5. "Não Tem Solução"
6. "La Paloma"
7. "Mona Lisa"
8. "Si Tu Partais" - (Michel Emer, English lyrics: Geoffrey Parsons)
9. "Quiéreme Mucho"
10. "Torna a Surriento"
11. "Too Young"
12. "Bésame Mucho"
