= You Are My Love (album) =

Studio album by Frankie Laine
- Released: 1959
- Label: Columbia

Frankie Laine chronology
Reunion in Rhythm (1959)	You Are My Love (1959)	Frankie Laine, Balladeer (1959)

Professional ratings
Review scores
Source	Rating
AllMusic	2/5 stars
Billboard	4/4 stars

You Are My Love is a studio album by Frankie Laine released in 1959 on Columbia Records.

== Track listing ==
Side one
No.	Title	Writer(s)	Length
1.	"You Are My Love"	Frankie Laine; Carl T. Fischer
2.	"I Married an Angel"	Hart; Rodgers
3.	"Forever More"	Frankie Laine; Carl T. Fischer
4.	"Second Honeymoon"	Morey Amsterdam
5.	"My Kind of Woman"	Morey Amsterdam
6.	"Side by Side"	H. Woods

Side two
No.	Title	Writer(s)	Length
1.	"The Touch of Your Lips"	R. Noble
2.	"Because"	Teschemacher; D'Hardelot
3.	"To My Wife"	Eugster
4.	"Try a Little Tenderness"	H. Woods; Campbell; R. Connelly
5.	"I'll Get By"	Roy Turk; Fred Ahlert
6.	"We Just Couldn't Say Goodbye"	H. Woods
