= You, No One but You =

1967 song by Frankie Laine

"You, No One but You" is a song by Frankie Laine from his 1967 album I Wanted Someone to Love.

== Charts ==
Chart (1967)	Peak position
US Billboard Hot 100	83
US Adult Contemporary (Billboard)	6
