= Every Time I Feel the Spirit =

Song
- Written: before 1861
- Genre: Spiritual
- Songwriter: Unknown

"Every Time I Feel the Spirit" (a.k.a. "Ev'ry Time I Feel the Spirit") is an African-American spiritual dating to before the US Civil War. The song has been frequently recorded by contemporary artists and gospel music groups.

== Lyrics ==
Refrain
Every time I feel the Spirit
moving in my heart I will pray.
Yes, every time I feel the Spirit
moving in my heart I will pray

Verse 1
Upon the mountain, when my Lord spoke,
out of God's mouth came fire and smoke.
Looked all around me, it looked so fine,
till I asked my Lord if all was mine. [Refrain]

Verse 2
Jordan River, chilly and cold,
it chills the body but not the soul.
There is but one train upon this track.
It runs to heaven and then right back. [Refrain]

Alternative Lyrics

Refrain
Every time I feel the Spirit
moving in my heart I will pray.
Yes, every time I feel the Spirit
moving in my heart I will pray

Verse 1
Upon the mountain, my Lord spoke,
out his mouth came fire and smoke.
All around me, looks so shine,
ask my Lord if all was mine. [Refrain]

Verse 2
Jordan River, runs right cold,
chills the body not the soul.
Ain't but one train on this track,
runs to heaven and right back. [Refrain]

== Content ==
As a Spiritual, "Every Time" draws heavily from the Bible. The verse

Upon the mountain, when my Lord spoke,
out of God's mouth came fire and smoke.

Is drawn from Exodus 19:18, which describes Moses' encounter with god on Mount Sinai where god "descended upon it in fire" The verse

Jordan River, chilly and cold,
it chills the body but not the soul.

In the bible, the Jordan River is significant in the Book of Joshua as separating the Israelites from the promised land of Canaan. In spirituals, the Jordan river often symbolizes death and the passage into heaven. Alternatively, it can symbolize emancipation, referencing the Israelite's escape from slavery. The line "chills the body but not the soul" is sometimes performed as "kills the body but not the soul."

== History ==
"Every Time" likely originated during the Antebellum South by enslaved people. Abraham Lincoln is claimed to have visited a holding camp for contraband in Washington, D.C. during the Civil War and heard the group of former slaves sing to him. it is said that "Ev'ry time" brought him to tears. It remained a standard in black religious music and was standardized in hymn books in the early 20th century.

== Recordings ==
The first recording of "Every Time" was made in 1923 by the Morehouse College Quartet. It was recorded multiple times throughout the 1920s.

== See also ==
- Christian child's prayer § Spirituals
- Spirituals
- Michael, Row the Boat Ashore
- Go Down Moses
- W. E. B. Du Bois
- Every Time I Feel the Spirit (album)
