= With All My Heart (Frankie Laine album) =

Studio album by Frankie Laine
- Released: 1955
- Language: English
- Label: Mercury

Frankie Laine chronology
Concert Date (1955)	With All My Heart (1955)	Command Performance (1956)

With All My Heart is a 1955 album by Frankie Laine with the orchestras of Harry Geller and Carl Fischer.

These songs were recorded for the Mercury Records label during the Forties and 1950. Laine was contracted by Columbia Records in 1951. "Get Happy", written by Harold Arlen and Ted Koehler, had already been recorded by Laine with Carl Fischer's Orchestra and was originally released in 1951 with "(I Would Do) Anything for You" by Claude Hopkins, Alexander Hill and Bobby Williams as B-side - also on this album. Fischer had died the year before this album was released.

== Track listing ==
1. "Isle of Capri"
2. "That's How Rhythm Was Born"
3. "Ain't Misbehavin'"
4. "The Gang That Sang Heart of My Heart" – written by Ben Ryan
5. "Inspiration Point"
6. "Come Love with Me"
7. "With All My Heart"
8. "What Could Be Sweeter" – a 1946 song written by Laine himself with Carl Fischer.
9. "I Would Do Most Anything for You"
10. "Get Happy"
11. "South of the Border" – by Jimmy Kennedy and Michael Carr
12. "You Left Me Out in the Rain"
