= Every Time I Feel the Spirit (album) =

Studio album by Nat King Cole
- Released: 1959
- Recorded: September 29, 30, 1958, Chicago
- Genres: Gospel, spiritual
- Length: 42:04
- Label: Capitol
- Producer: Lee Gillette

Nat King Cole chronology
Tell Me All About Yourself (1960)	Every Time I Feel the Spirit (1959)	Wild Is Love (1960)

Alternative cover / title
- 1966 re-issue

Professional ratings
Review scores
Source	Rating
Allmusic	2.5/5 stars
DownBeat	2/5 stars

Every Time I Feel the Spirit is a 1959 studio album by Nat King Cole, of spirituals, arranged by Gordon Jenkins. Cole is accompanied by the First Church of Deliverance Choir of Chicago, Illinois. The album was re-issued by Capitol Records in 1966 under the new title, Nat King Cole Sings Hymns and Spirituals. Several bonus tracks, recorded between 1951 and 1961 and arranged by Nelson Riddle and others, were added to later CD re-issues.

== Track listing ==
1. "Every Time I Feel the Spirit" – 1:49
2. "I Want to Be Ready" – 1:47
3. "Sweet Hour of Prayer" – 1:50
4. "Ain't Gonna Study War No More" – 2:39
5. "I Found the Answer" (Johnny Lange) – 2:00
6. "Standin' in the Need of Prayer" – 2:13
7. "Oh, Mary, Don't You Weep" (Nat "King" Cole, Gordon Jenkins) – 1:58
8. "Go Down Moses" – 1:51
9. "Nobody Knows the Trouble I've Seen" – 2:46
10. "In the Sweet By and By" (S. Fillmore Bennett, Joseph P. Webster) – 1:55
11. "I Couldn't Hear Nobody Pray" – 1:54
12. "Steal Away" – 2:49

Bonus tracks added to later re-issues:

13. "The First Baseball Game" (Gene de Paul, Don Raye) – 2:30
14. "This Holy Love" (Haven Gillespie, Larry Shay) – 3:05
15. "Peace of Mind" (Gus Kahn) – 2:56
16. "Easter Sunday Morning" (Cole, Ervin Drake, Jimmy Shirl) – 3:02
17. "Believe" (Moose Charlap, Paul O'Neil) – 2:23
18. "The Lighthouse in the Sky" (Hal David, Morty Nevins) – 2:37

All songs are traditional Negro spirituals, other composers indicated.

== Personnel ==
=== Performance ===
- Nat King Cole – vocal
- The First Church of Deliverance Choir
- Gordon Jenkins – arranger, conductor
