= Singing the Blues (Frankie Laine album) =

Studio album by Frankie Laine
- Released: 1959
- Label: Mercury Wing

Professional ratings
Review scores
Source	Rating
Billboard	4/4 stars

Singing the Blues is a studio album by Frankie Laine, released in 1959 on Mercury's subsidiary Wing Records.

In 1962, this monaural album had a low-priced re-release in "electronically created" stereo.

== Track listing ==
Side one
No.	Title	Writer(s)	Length
1.	"Mam'selle"	Edmund Goulding; Mack Gordon	2:48
2.	"I'm Gonna Live till I Die"	Al Hofman; Walter Kent; Mann Curtis	2:35
3.	"I've Only Myself to Blame"	Redd Evans; Dave Mann	3:00
4.	"I Haven't the Heart"	Matt Dennis; Frankie Laine	2:45
5.	"I Can't Believe That You're in Love with Me"	Clarence Gaskill; Jimmy McHugh	2:35

Side two
No.	Title	Writer(s)	Length
1.	"A Sunday Kind of Love"	Barbara Belle; Anita Leonard; Stan Rhodes; Louis Prima	3:05
2.	"Ah! But It Happens"	Walter Kent; "By" Dunham	3:13
3.	"That Ain't Right"	Nat Cole; Irving Mills	2:44
4.	"Put Yourself in My Place Baby"	Hoagy Carmichael; Frankie Laine	2:38
5.	"Nevertheless (I'm in Love with You)"	Bert Kalmar; Harry Ruby	2:50
