= Tell Me All About Yourself =

Studio album by Nat King Cole
- Released: March 1960
- Studio: Capitol (New York)
- Genre: Jazz
- Length: 28:42
- Label: Capitol
- Producer: Lee Gillette

Nat King Cole chronology
A Mis Amigos (1959)	Tell Me All About Yourself (1960)	Every Time I Feel the Spirit (1960)

Professional ratings
Review scores
Source	Rating
AllMusic	3/5 stars

Tell Me All About Yourself is an album by Nat King Cole that was released in 1960. It was arranged by Dave Cavanaugh. The album reached No. 33 on the Billboard album chart. Music critic Marc Myers put it at number three on his top ten list of best Nat King Cole albums.

== Track listing ==
1. "Tell Me All About Yourself" (Hub Atwood, Mel Leven) – 2:08
2. "Until the Real Thing Comes Along" (Mann Holiner, Alberta Nichols, Sammy Cahn, Saul Chaplin, L.E. Freeman) – 3:10
3. "The Best Thing for You (Would Be Me)" (Irving Berlin) – 2:01
4. "When You Walked By" (Johnny Burke, Joe Bushkin) – 2:49
5. "Crazy She Calls Me" (Bob Russell, Carl Sigman) – 2:37
6. "You've Got the Indian Sign on Me" (Johnny Burke, Joe Bushkin) – 1:49
7. "For You" (Johnny Burke, Al Dubin) – 2:21
8. "Dedicated to You" (Sammy Cahn, Saul Chaplin, Hy Zaret) – 2:53
9. "You Are My Love" (Stanley Bass, Noel Sherman) – 1:56
10. "This Is Always" (Mack Gordon, Harry Warren) – 2:57
11. "My Life" (Nat King Cole, Nat Simon) – 2:12
12. "(I Would Do) Anything for You (Alex Hill, Claude Hopkins) – 1:47
