= (I Would Do) Anything for You =

1932 jazz standard

(I Would Do) Anything for You is a 1932 jazz standard. It was written by Alex Hill, Claude Hopkins and Bob Williams. The first recording was by Claude Hopkins and His Orchestra (with Ovie Alston on lead vocals) on May 24, 1932 for Columbia Records (No. 2665D).

== Other recordings ==
There have been many instrumental versions of the tune, notably by:

- Benny Goodman (1936)
- Art Tatum (1934).
- Mokave (1991)

Significant vocal versions include:

- Una Mae Carlisle, 1938-05-20, recorded in London. Track #2 of 6 recorded by Una Mae Carlisle and Her Jam Band in her first ever recording session.
- Frankie Laine - for his album Reunion in Rhythm (1959)
- Kay Starr - Kay Starr: Jazz Singer (1960)
- Nat King Cole - Tell Me All About Yourself (1960)

== See also ==
- List of jazz standards
