= To Each His Own (album) =

Studio album by Frankie Laine
- Released: 1968
- Label: ABC
- Producer: Bob Thiele

Frankie Laine chronology
I Wanted Someone to Love (1967)	To Each His Own (1968)	Take Me Back to Laine Country (1968)

Professional ratings
Review scores
Source	Rating
AllMusic	2/5 stars
Billboard	Positive

To Each His Own is a studio album by Frankie Laine released in 1968 on ABC Records.

== Track listing ==
Side one
No.	Title	Writer(s)	Length
1.	"To Each His Own"	J. Livingston, R. Evans	3:03
2.	"Green, Green Grass of Home"	Curly Putman	3:02
3.	"I Wish I Had Someone like You"	Johnny Mercer, A. Hansen	1:51
4.	"You Always Hurt the One You Love"	D. Fisher, A. Roberts	2:22
5.	"I Found You"	Craig Evans	2:34
6.	"Laughing on the Outside (Crying on the Inside)"	B. Raleigh, B. Wayne	2:19

Side two
No.	Title	Writer(s)	Length
1.	"I'm Happy to Hear You're Sorry"	Larry Kusik, Eddie Snyder	2:19
2.	"It Don't Mean a Thing to Me"	Ray Pennington	2:46
3.	"I've Got a Right to Cry"	Joe Liggins	2:30
4.	"I Need You"	V. Morton	2:34
5.	"Meet Me Half Way"	Barry De Vorzon, B. Chandler	2:18
6.	"I Don't Want to Set the World on Fire"	Seiler, Marcus, Benjamin, Durham	3:16

== Charts ==
Chart (1968)	Peak position
US Top LPs (Billboard)	127
