= I'll Take Care of Your Cares =

1967 song by Frankie Laine

"I'll Take Care of Your Cares" is a song by Frankie Laine, written by Mort Dixon and James Monaco. This is the title track from his 1967 album I'll Take Care of Your Cares.

== Charts ==
Chart (1967)	Peak position
Canada RPM Top Singles	37
US Billboard Hot 100	39
US Adult Contemporary (Billboard)	2

=== Yearly charts ===
Chart (1967)	Peak position
US Billboard Hot 100 — 1967	84
US Billboard Top Easy Listening Singles — 1967	12
