= One for My Baby (Frankie Laine album) =

Studio album by Frankie Laine
- Released: 1952
- Label: Columbia

Frankie Laine chronology
Frankie Laine; Frankie Laine; Frankie Laine (1950)	One for My Baby (1952)	A Musical Portrait of New Orleans (1954)

Professional ratings
Review scores
Source	Rating
AllMusic	3/5 stars
Billboard	86/100

One for My Baby is a 10-inch studio album by Frankie Laine, released in 1952 on Columbia Records. It was recorded with Paul Weston and his orchestra and Carl Fischer on the piano.

It was Laines' first album for Columbia. All its eight tracks were previously unreleased, some songs were brand new.

The album was released in three formats: one 10-inch long-playing 33-rpm record, a set of four 7-inch 45-rpm records, and a set of four 10-inch 78-rpm phonograph records.

== Track listing ==
Side one
No.	Title	Writer(s)	Length
1.	"Tomorrow Mountain" (from Beggar's Holiday)	Latouche; D. Ellington
2.	"Song of the Islands (Na lei o Hawaii)"	C. King
3.	"(She Walks like You – She Talks like You) She Reminds Me of You"	M. Gordon; Revel
4.	"To Be Worthy of You"	Klages; Gross

Side two
No.	Title	Writer(s)	Length
1.	"When It's Sleepy Time Down South"	L. René; O. René; Muse
2.	"Love Is Such a Cheat"	Caesar; Hollander; Marks
3.	"Necessary Evil"	R. Evans
4.	"One for My Baby (and One More for the Road)" (from the Sky's the Limit)	Mercer; Arlen
