= I Wanted Someone to Love =

Studio album by Frankie Laine
- Released: 1967
- Label: ABC

Frankie Laine chronology
I'll Take Care of Your Cares (1967)	I Wanted Someone to Love (1967)	To Each His Own (1968)

Professional ratings
Review scores
Source	Rating
AllMusic	4.5/5 stars
Billboard	Positive ("Pop spotlight" pick)

I Wanted Someone to Love is a studio album by Frankie Laine released in 1967 on ABC Records.

== Track listing ==
Side one
No.	Title	Writer(s)	Length
1.	"You Wanted Someone to Play With (I Wanted Someone to Love)"	Campano; Morris; Osborne; McConnell	2:35
2.	"Ev'ry Street's a Boulevard (in Old New York)"	Bob Hilliard; Jules Styne	2:02
3.	"Sometimes (I Just Can't Stand You)"	Harold Spina	2:45
4.	"There's Not a Moment to Spare"	Watt; Sigfield; Baron	2:34
5.	"The Gypsy"	Billy Reid	2:22
6.	"The Real True Meaning of Love"	Larry Kusik; Eddie Snyder	2:30

Side two
No.	Title	Writer(s)	Length
1.	"Laura, What's He Got That I Ain't Got"	L. Ashley; M. Singleton	2:40
2.	"I Heard You Cried Last Night"	Kruger; Grouya	2:50
3.	"Give Me Your Kisses"	L. Whitcup; G. Douglas	1:52
4.	"You, No One but You"	P. DeAngelis; J. Sawyer; N. Catranbone	2:55
5.	"You Taught Me How to Love You Now Teach Me to Forget"	Drislane; Bryan; Meyer	2:40

== Charts ==
Chart (1967)	Peak position
US Top LPs (Billboard)	162
