= You Wanted Someone to Play With (I Wanted Someone to Love) =

1967 song by Frankie Laine

"You Wanted Someone to Play With (I Wanted Someone to Love)" is a song by Frankie Laine from his 1967 album I Wanted Someone to Love.

== Charts ==
Chart (1967)	Peak position
Canada RPM Top Singles	40
US Billboard Hot 100	48
US Adult Contemporary (Billboard)	5

=== Yearly charts ===
Chart (1967)	Peak position
US Billboard Top Easy Listening Singles — 1967	38
