= Call of the Wild (Frankie Laine album) =

Studio album by Frankie Laine
- Released: 1962
- Label: Columbia

Frankie Laine chronology
Deuces Wild (1961)	Call of the Wild (1962)	Wanderlust (1963)

Professional ratings
Review scores
Source	Rating
AllMusic	3/5 stars

Call of the Wild is a studio album by Frankie Laine released in 1962 on Columbia Records. It was recorded with the orchestra and chorus conducted by Johnny Williams.

== Track listing ==
Side one
No.	Title	Writer(s)	Length
1.	"Song of the Open Road"	Albert Hay Malotte
2.	"North to Alaska"	M. Phillips
3.	"The Swamp Girl"	M. Brown
4.	"Beyond the Blue Horizon"	L. Robin; R. A. Whiting; W. F. Harling
5.	"Call of the Wild"	D. Scalfe; G. Scalfe
6.	"On the Trail"	Harold Adamson; F. Grofe

Side two
No.	Title	Writer(s)	Length
1.	"The Wayfaring Stranger"	G. Green; Frankie Laine
2.	"Tumbling Tumbleweeds"	B. Nolan
3.	"The High Road"	Frankie Laine; M. Bristol; L. Kempinski
4.	"Rolling Stone"	S. Sornoff
5.	"The New Frontier"	Wayne Shanklin
6.	"The Girl in the Wood"	N. Stuart; Terry Gilkyson
