= That's Good, That's Bad (Frankie Laine song) =

"That's Good! That's Bad!"

Single by Frankie Laine and Jo Stafford
- B-side: "In the Cool, Cool, Cool of the Evening"
- Released: 1951
- Genre: Traditional pop
- Length: 2:45
- Label: Columbia
- Songwriters: Ervin Drake; Jimmy Shirl

"That's Good! That's Bad!" is a 1951 hit song sung by Jo Stafford and Frankie Laine. It was written by Ervin Drake and Jimmy Shirl.

== Charts ==
| Chart (1951) | Peak position |
|---|---|
| Australia (Kent Music Report) | 2 |
| US Billboard Hot 100 | 17 |
