= Al Lerner (composer) =

American musician

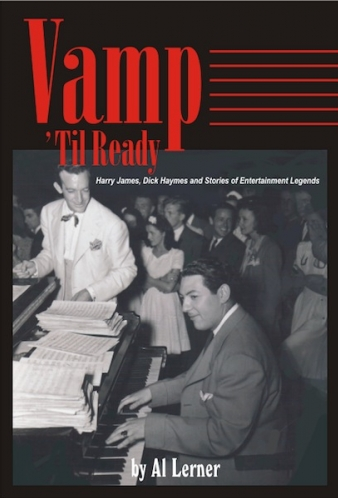
- Lerner on the cover of his 2007 book Vamp 'Til Ready. He is playing piano, with bandleader Harry James looking on.
- Born: April 7, 1919; Cleveland, Ohio, U.S.
- Died: January 19, 2014 (aged 94)
- Known for: Big band pianist, musical director, and composer

Al Lerner (1919 – January 19, 2014) was an American pianist, composer, arranger, and conductor from the big band era. He was a member of the Harry James band for many years, playing piano. He wrote music for several artists, including Allan Sherman and Liza Minnelli. He also wrote the music for "So Until I See You", the closing theme for The Tonight Show with Jack Paar in the early 1960s, and was the pianist for A Tribute to Eddie Duchin, which was a soundtrack for the 1956 biographical film pic The Eddy Duchin Story.

== Biography ==
Lerner was born on April 7, 1919, in Cleveland, the youngest of three children. Their father Abraham had died on November 11, 1918, before Al's birth, a victim of the 1918 flu pandemic. Lerner's mother Jennie Takiff then married a sheet metal worker named Abe Lerner, who became Al's adopted father. During the American Prohibition banning the sale of alcohol, Abe Lerner used his metalworking abilities on the side to make stills for Cleveland gangsters and bootleggers, and used his seven-year-old son Al as a courier for payments. It was a rough neighborhood with regular mob wars between rival gangsters, multiple killings on Lerner's street, and payoffs to the local police. Abe Lerner was eventually arrested and the still business was shut down, after which the family went broke.

As a child, Lerner helped to bring in money by climbing onto tables in local saloons and singing songs such as "All Alone by the Telephone", and then collecting coins thrown by the patrons. He then took piano lessons at a convent next to St. Anne's Hospital, but quit because he thought it was too difficult. When he saw a performance by Bill Robinson at the Palace Theatre, he decided he wanted to learn tap dancing, so studied with Roy Lewis, and soon was winning amateur contests. He was also learning how to play drums from his brother Harold, and began playing for $1.50/night at a local brothel. As he tired of carrying the drums back and forth though, he decided to switch back to piano as it was easier, and resumed his lessons. His skills continued to improve, and by the age of 17 he had worked his way up to earning $15/week, playing at clubs such as Shadowland, and developing an affinity for jazz by listening to records by Earl Hines. He attended John Adams High School and Glenville High School.

Lerner was introduced to jazz pianist Art Tatum at a Cleveland Club, and was "blown away" by the man's skill as a jazz player. Lerner then traveled in search of work, going to Miami Beach but the job fell through, so he then went to Havana, Cuba, aboard The Cuba. When he returned to the United States, he got a call from Harry James, who invited Lerner to join his band in New York. There, Lerner discovered that James wanted to have an unheard-of two pianos in his band, with Lerner playing one, and Jack Gardner the other. With a steady job, Lerner proposed to his Cleveland girlfriend, Ruth Levkovitz, and they married on June 15, 1941, and settled in New York, though Lerner spent much of his time on the road with the band, doing 50 and 60 one-night-stands at a time.

In 1941, when Ray Bolger (later the Scarecrow in The Wizard of Oz) was a featured act with the James band at the Paramount Theatre in New York, Lerner and Bolger would do a "challenge" tap dance as part of the show. When Glenn Miller enlisted in the Army, his band was not able to perform on the Chesterfield Hour radio program, after which the Harry James Band was chosen. This meant a major increase in salary for Lerner, up to $75/week. With the exposure on the radio show, the band also began getting work in the film industry, such as in Private Buckaroo and Springtime in the Rockies. The band got more attention, and was regularly on the move, from New York to Los Angeles and back again. It was during this time that Lerner began composing, such as writing an instrumental with Harry James, "Music Makers", which became the band's theme. When the James Band finally broke up in 1944, Lerner stayed in Los Angeles and joined with singer Dick Haymes, with whom he worked for the next thirteen years as musical director.

Over the course of his career, Lerner worked with many artists from the Big Band era of music, such as Charlie Barnet, Tommy Dorsey, Glenn Miller, Rosemary Clooney, Kay Starr, and Pat Boone. He played with the Harry James band at the Paramount Theater in 1940, featuring Bea Wain, has performed at Carnegie Hall, and was conductor at a Royal Command Performance for Queen Elizabeth in 1954 at the London Palladium, in a benefit for the Variety Artistes Benevolent Fund. Lyricists that he has worked with include Frankie Laine. In 1961, he composed the music for "So Until I See You", with lyrics by Victor Gari Corpora. The music was used as the closing theme of the Jack Paar Show. It was recorded by singer David Lucas for Arwin Records.

Lerner's first wife, Ruth Levkovitz Lerner, died in 1986. In 1991 he remarried, and as of 2014, Lerner was living in Palm Desert, California, with his wife, Jonne. He has two children by his first marriage. Al Lerner died January 19, 2014, from Prostate Cancer at Eisenhower Hospital in Rancho Mirage, CA. He was 94. At the time of his death he was the sole surviving member of the Harry James Orchestra of the early 1940s.

== Notable works ==
- Pianist, Tribute to Eddie Duchin, soundtrack for the film The Eddy Duchin Story, 1957
- Composer, "So Until I See You", closing theme for the Jack Paar Tonight Show in the early 1960s
- Conductor and Arranger of "My Son the Box", performed by humorist Allan Sherman
- Composer, arranger, and pianist, "Jump Sauce", performed by the Harry James band
- Pianist, LP "Rockin'" (1957) by Frankie Laine
- Pianist, "Sentimental Journey", sung by Helen Forrest
- 1989, co-executive producer for TV special "Glenn Miller Band Reunion"
- "Only If We Love" (with Frankie Laine)
- "Torchin" (with Frankie Laine)
- Music in 1942 film Give Out, Sisters
- Other works as part of "Harry James and His Music Makers"
  - Some music on the 2007 series Damages, starring Glenn Close.
  - Original music in the 1944 film Bathing Beauty with Esther Williams
  - Music for 1953's All Ashore, with Dick Haymes and Mickey Rooney
  - Music for 2007 film Married Life with Pierce Brosnan
  - Music in 1942 film Private Buckaroo.

== See also ==
- Eddie Duchin
- David Lucas (composer)
