= Deuces Wild (Frankie Laine album) =

Studio album by Frankie Laine
- Released: 1962
- Label: Columbia
- Producer: Irving Townsend

Frankie Laine chronology
Hell Bent for Leather! (1961)	Deuces Wild (1962)	Call of the Wild (1962)

Professional ratings
Review scores
Source	Rating
AllMusic	2.5/5 stars

Deuces Wild is a studio album by Frankie Laine released in 1962 on Columbia Records.

== Track listing ==
Side one
No.	Title	Writer(s)	Length
1.	"The Hard Way"	J. Laine; L. Sullivan	2:39
2.	"Camptown Races"	S. Foster; arr: Johnny Williams	2:25
3.	"Luck Be a Lady"	F. Loesser	2:46
4.	"Get Rich Quick"	J. Feather; Leonard Feather	2:58
5.	"Horses and Women"	Frankie Laine	2:13
6.	"Moonlight Gambler"	B. Hilliard; P. Springer	2:32

Side two
No.	Title	Writer(s)	Length
1.	"Ace in the Hole"	J. Dempsey; G. Mitchell	2:27
2.	"The Man Who Broke the Bank at Monte Carlo"	F. Gilbert; arr.: Johnny Williams	1:57
3.	"Dead Man's Hand"	G. Helm	2:17
4.	"The Roving Gambler"	arr: Johnny Williams	2:15
5.	"Deuces Wild"	Frankie Laine; M. Oatman; R. Barr	3:22
6.	"Gamblin' Woman"	N. Grey; Terry Gilkyson; T. Lehmann	2:09
