= Wanderlust (Frankie Laine album) =

Studio album by Frankie Laine
- Released: 1963
- Recorded: 1962
- Genre: Vocal
- Label: Columbia
- Producer: Irving Townsend

Frankie Laine chronology
Call of the Wild (1962)	Wanderlust (1963)	Roving Gambler (1964)

Professional ratings
Review scores
Source	Rating
Allmusic	2/5 stars
New Record Mirror	4/5 stars

Wanderlust was Frankie Laine's 42nd 12" long-play album, recorded and originally released in 1963. It is organized loosely around the theme of freedom and travel, pertaining to the German word Wanderlust.

== Track listing ==
1. "Love is Where You Find It"
2. "Serenade"
3. "Wagon Wheels"
4. "I Let Her Go"
5. "Misirlou"
6. "Riders in the Sky"
7. "De Glory Road"
8. "What Kind of Fool Am I"
9. "On the Road to Mandalay"
10. "If I Love Again"
11. "The Moment of Truth"
12. "I'm Gonna Live 'Til I Die"
