= I'll Take Care of Your Cares (album) =

Studio album by Frankie Laine
- Released: 1967
- Genre: Pop
- Label: ABC

Frankie Laine chronology
I Believe (1965)	I'll Take Care of Your Cares (1967)	I Wanted Someone to Love (1967)

Professional ratings
Review scores
Source	Rating
AllMusic	4.5/5 stars
Billboard	Positive ("Pop spotlignt" pick)

I'll Take Care of Your Cares is a studio album by Frankie Laine released in 1967 on ABC Records.

== Track listing ==
Side one
No.	Title	Writer(s)	Length
1.	"I'll Take Care of Your Cares"	Mort Dixon; James Monaco	2:46
2.	"I'm Free"	Steve Karliski	2:34
3.	"Maybe"	Flynn; Madden	2:30
4.	"You're Breaking My Heart"	Genaro; Skylar	3:05
5.	"Heartless One"	DeAngelis; Galbraith; Mareno	2:55
6.	"What Do You Do with an Old Old Song?"	John Herring	2:45

Side two
No.	Title	Writer(s)	Length
1.	"Making Memories"	Larry Kusik; Eddie Snyder	2:55
2.	"Somewhere There's Someone"	L. Whitcup; G. Douglas	2:38
3.	"The Moment of Truth"	A. Frisch; S. Dee; G. Douglas	2:18
4.	"If I Didn't Care"	Jack Lawrence	2:50
5.	"I Wish You Were Jealous of Me"	E. Haubrich; G. Rowell	2:05

== Charts ==
Chart (1967)	Peak position
US Top LPs (Billboard)	16
