= Frankie Laine (1950 album) =

Studio album by Frankie Laine
- Released: 1950
- Recorded: 1949
- Genre: Vocal
- Label: Mercury

Frankie Laine chronology
Frankie Laine (1949)	Frankie Laine (1950)	Two Loves Have I (1950)

Frankie Laine, is the second in a series of albums of the same name, recorded by Frankie Laine for Mercury Records. This album is cataloged as MG 25026.

== Track listing ==
Track no.	Song title
1.	When You're Smiling
2.	Swamp Girl
3.	Kiss Me Again
4.	Satan Wears a Satin Gown
5.	I Get Sentimental Over Nothing
6.	September in the Rain
7.	Carry Me Back to Old Virginny
8.	Black Lace
