= Rockin' (Frankie Laine album) =

Studio album by Frankie Laine
- Released: 1957
- Genre: Pop
- Label: Columbia

Frankie Laine chronology
| Frankie Laine and the Four Lads (1956) | Rockin' (1957) | Frankie Laine's Greatest Hits (1958) |

Rockin' is a 1957 album by Frankie Laine, which reached No. 13 on the US album chart. Laine was backed by the Paul Weston Orchestra.

== Track listing ==
1. By the River Ste. Marie
2. Black and Blue
3. That's My Desire
4. Blue Turning Grey Over You
5. That Lucky Old Sun
6. That Ain't Right
7. Shine
8. Rockin' Chair
9. We'll Be Together Again
10. West End Blues
11. Give Me a Kiss for Tomorrow
12. On the Sunny Side of the Street
