= Frankie Laine, Balladeer =

Studio album by Frankie Laine
- Released: 1959
- Label: Columbia

Frankie Laine chronology
You Are My Love (1959)	Frankie Laine, Balladeer (1959)	Hell Bent for Leather! (1961)

Professional ratings
Review scores
Source	Rating
AllMusic	3/5 stars

Frankie Laine, Balladeer is a studio album by Frankie Laine released in 1959 on Columbia Records.

== Track listing ==
Side one
No.	Title	Writer(s)	Length
1.	"Rocks and Gravel"	A. Lomax; Revised lyric: Leon Bibb
2.	"Old Virginny"	James A. Bland; Arr. Frankie Laine
3.	"Cherry Red"	Moon; Lazerus
4.	"On a Monday"	Arr.: J. A. Lomax
5.	"Careless Love" (with Fred Katz and his Orchestra)	Arr.: Frankie Laine
6.	"Sixteen Tons" (with Frank De Vol & his Orch.)	Travis

Side two
No.	Title	Writer(s)	Length
1.	"Jelly Coal Man" (with Frank De Vol & his Orch.)
2.	"Lucy D"	Drucker; E. Miller
3.	"New Orleans"	Arr.: J. A. Lomax; A. Lomax; G. Turner
4.	"Old Blue"	Arr.: J. A. Lomax
5.	"Stack of Blue" (with Fred Katz & his Orch.)	Rudolf Friml
6.	"And Doesn't She Roll" (with Frank De Vol & his Orch.)	Frankie Laine; J. Wilson; Fred Katz
