= Moonlight Gambler =

Single by Frankie Laine
- B-side: "Lotus Land"
- Released: October 29, 1956
- Genre: Pop
- Length: 2:50
- Label: Columbia
- Songwriters: Bob Hilliard, Phil Springer
- Producer: Mitch Miller

Frankie Laine singles chronology
"On the Road to Mandalay" (1956)	"Moonlight Gambler" (1956)	"Love is a Golden Ring" (1957)

"Moonlight Gambler" is a song written by Bob Hilliard and Phil Springer and performed by Frankie Laine featuring Ray Conniff and His Orchestra. It reached No. 3 on the U.S. pop chart and No. 13 on the UK singles chart in 1957.

The single ranked No. 32 on Billboard's Year-End top 50 singles of 1957.

The song begins with a spoken recitation by Laine saying:

"You can gamble for matchsticks,/ You can gamble for gold,/ The stakes may be heavy or small,/ But, if you haven't gambled for love and lost,/ Then you haven't gambled at all". Which is repeated when sung in the bridge section of the song. Laine's version also features a whistler (Ray Conniff did the whistling) and a clip clopping sound.

== Other versions ==
- Gene Barry released a version of the song as the B-side to his 1962 single "Red Silk Stockings and Green Perfume".
- Winifred Atwell released a version of the song on her 2001 compilation album, Best of Winifred Atwell.
- T. Storm Hunter released a version of the song on his 2010 album, Airways Hotel.
