= Reunion in Rhythm (album) =

Studio album by Frankie Laine
- Released: 1959
- Label: Columbia

Professional ratings
Review scores
Source	Rating
AllMusic	2/5 stars
Billboard	4/4 stars

Reunion in Rhythm is a studio album by Frankie Laine with Michel Legrand and his orchestra, released in 1959 on Columbia Records.

== Track listing ==
Side one
No.	Title	Writer(s)	Length
1.	"Too Marvelous for Words"	Mercer; R. A. Whiting
2.	"I Forget the Time"	Eng. lyrics: Carl Eugster; French lyrics: Jean Drejac; Michel Legrand
3.	"September in the Rain"	Dubin; Warren
4.	"You're Just the Kind"	Carey; Fischer
5.	"I Would Do Anything for You"	A. Hill; B. Williams; Hopkins
6.	"Lover, Come Back to Me"	Hammerstein II; Romberg

Side two
No.	Title	Writer(s)	Length
1.	"Blue Moon"	Hart; Rodgers
2.	"The Love of Loves"	Laine; Fischer
3.	"Dream a Little Dream of Me"	Kahn; Schwandt; Andre
4.	"Baby, Just for Me"	Laine; Fischer
5.	"I'm Confessin' (that I Love You)"	Neiburg; Dougherty; Reynolds
6.	"Marie"	Berlin
