= Mule Train =

Single by Tennessee Ernie Ford

from the album Sixteen Tons
- B-side: "Anticipation Blues"
- Released: November 1949
- Recorded: October 18, 1949
- Genre: Rhythm and blues; country; folk
- Length: 3:04
- Label: Capitol
- Songwriters: Johnny Lange, Hy Heath, Ramblin' Tommy Scott and Fred Glickman

Tennessee Ernie Ford singles chronology
"Smokey Mountain Boogie" (1949)	"Mule Train" (1949)	"The Cry of the Wild Goose" (1950)

"Mule Train" is a popular song written by Johnny Lange, Hy Heath, Ramblin' Tommy Scott and Fred Glickman. It is a cowboy song, with the singer filling the role of an Old West wagon driver, spurring on his team of mules pulling a delivery wagon. As he goes about his work, the driver mentions the various mail-order goods he is delivering to far-flung customers. "Mule Train" was originally recorded by Ellis "Buz" Butler Jr. in 1947. Butler was the original writer of the song along with Fred Glickman. The original recording was released by Buz Butler on Decca Records.

The song was featured in the 1950 Republic Western Singing Guns (where it was sung by Vaughn Monroe) and nominated for the Academy Award for Best Original Song in 1950, but lost out to "Mona Lisa".

Western Writers of America chose it as one of the Top 100 Western songs of all time.

== Charting versions ==
Charting versions were recorded by Frankie Laine, Bing Crosby, Tennessee Ernie Ford, and Vaughn Monroe.

Frankie Laine and the Muleskinners' version was recorded on October 2, 1949, and released by Mercury Records as catalog number 5345. This version first reached the Billboard chart on November 4, 1949, and lasted 13 weeks on the chart, peaking at number 1. Laine's recording of the song was produced by Mitch Miller. It featured a bellowed vocal delivery (like that of a real driver shouting to be heard) and studio-created gimmicks such as whipcracking sound effects. Critic Ralph J. Gleason called it "an early rock and roll hit for adults". It is often cited as an outstanding early example of studio production techniques.

The Bing Crosby version was recorded on October 26, 1949, and released by Decca Records as catalog number 24798. The flip side was "Dear Hearts and Gentle People" which peaked at number 2. The record first reached the Billboard chart on November 25, 1949, and lasted 16 weeks on the chart, peaking at number 4. This recording was featured in an episode of the NBC radio network radio program Lassie Show entitled "Mule Train", which aired on December 17, 1949.

The Tennessee Ernie Ford version was recorded on October 18, 1949, and released by Capitol Records as catalog number 40258. The record first reached the Billboard chart on November 25, 1949, and lasted nine weeks on the chart, peaking at number 10. Ford's version also charted on the Billboard country chart, reaching number 1 in December, becoming the first song to top the component "Country & Western Records Most Played By Folk Disk Jockeys" chart (on December 10, 1949). Like Laine's version, Ford's version contained whipcracking sound effects and shouting by the driver as he spurs on the mules.

Vaughn Monroe's version was released by RCA Victor Records as a 78 rpm single (catalog number 20-3600A) and a 45 rpm single (catalog number 47-3106) (in the United States). It was released by EMI on the His Master's Voice label as catalog number B 9836. The record first reached the Billboard chart on November 18, 1949, and lasted nine weeks on the listing, peaking at number 10. Monroe also sang the song in the 1950 Republic Western Singing Guns. He played an outlaw who became town marshal with the intent of stealing a shipment of gold, and sang the song while at the reins of what appeared to be a stagecoach.

== Other versions ==
Woody Herman and The King Cole Trio, with Irving Ashby, Joe Comfort and Gene Orloff, made a recording of "Mule Train" on November 7, 1949, in New York City, as well as the track "My Baby Just Cares For Me", which were both released by Capitol Records as a single, catalog number 787, which gave label credit to Herman for "Mule Train" and to the trio for "My Baby Just Cares For Me".

Burl Ives recorded a version of the song in the 1950s, featuring the snapping of the whips, and yells.

Gordon MacRae made a recording on October 21, 1949, which was released by Capitol Records in the United States as the flip side of the single "Dear Hearts and Gentle People" (which he also recorded on October 21, 1949).

Les Welch and his Orchestra made a recording in Australia in February, 1950, which was released by Pacific Records (in Australia).

The song was subsequently recorded in England by Frank Ifield in the 1960s.

In 1950, Gene Autry sang the tune in a film of the same title.

In 1950, a satirical version of the song, "Chinese Mule Train," was recorded by Spike Jones and his City Slickers, with banjoist Freddy Morgan (misspelled on the record like "Fleddy Morgan" as a joke) providing the Chinese-like vocals. It was issued on RCA Victor.

The song appeared on Rod McKuen's 1958 album Anywhere I Wander.

In 1960, Bo Diddley recorded a version of the song, but it was not released until 2009. The instrumental backing track for this song, however, was released in 1960 as "Travelin' West".

A reggae version was recorded by Count Prince Miller in 1971 and then again with Sly and Robbie in the 1980s.

Bob Blackman appeared on numerous British light entertainment programmes in the 1970s, singing "Mule Train" whilst hitting his head with a tin tray.

Comedy duo Bob and Ray released a version locally in Boston in 1949, with Ray Goulding singing in the character of Mary McGoon.
