= The Cry of the Wild Goose =

Single by Frankie Laine
- B-side: "Black Lace"
- Released: 1950
- Recorded: 1950
- Genre: Pop
- Length: 2:40
- Label: Mercury 5363
- Songwriter(s): Terry Gilkyson

Frankie Laine singles chronology
"Mule Train" (1949)	"The Cry of the Wild Goose" (1950)	"Satan Wears a Satin Gown" (1950)

"The Cry of the Wild Goose" is a 1950 song written by Terry Gilkyson. Originally performed by Frankie Laine, the song was his third consecutive number-one hit, following "That Lucky Old Sun" and "Mule Train" from the previous year. The song was released on 78 rpm in early 1950 by Mercury Records with catalog number 5363.

Laine's version spent two weeks at number-one on the Billboard Most Played by Jockeys music chart in March 1950.

The song was later covered by Tennessee Ernie Ford and was the uncredited theme song for the 1950 motion picture release Saddle Tramp.

The song is quoted at length in the 1952 novel ‘’Back of Town’’ by Maritta Wolff.

In a 1986 episode of Life With Lucy, Lucille Ball’s character references the song's lyrics when she states that she had to listen to Frankie Laine sing "I must go where the wild goose goes" before she could leave a message on an answering machine.

Brian Setzer covered the song on his 2003 album Nitro Burnin' Funny Daddy, changing the title and lyrics to "Wild Wind."
