= Frankie Laine =

American singer (1913–2007)

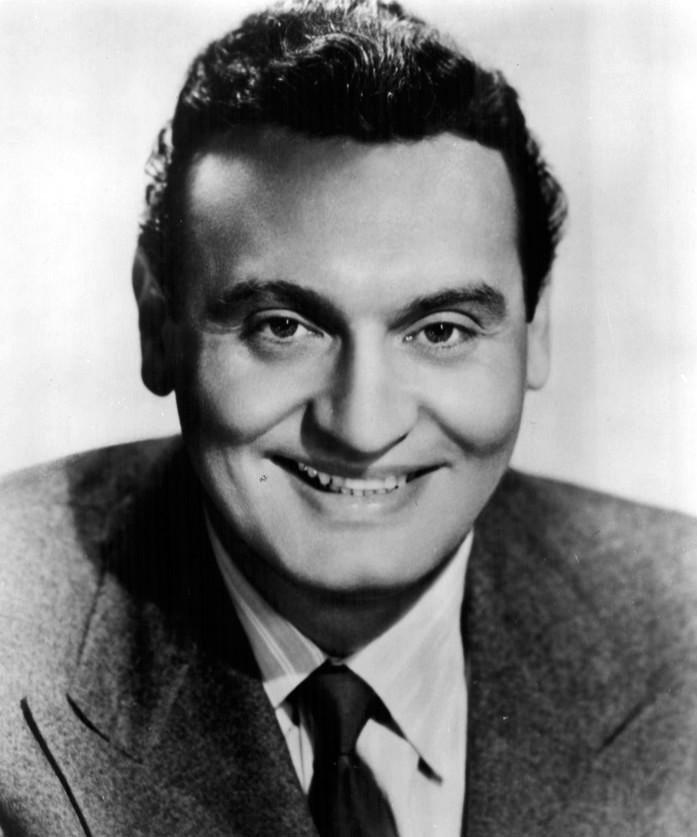
- Laine in 1954

Background information
- Born: Francesco Paolo LoVecchio; March 30, 1913; Chicago, Illinois, U.S.
- Died: February 6, 2007 (aged 93) San Diego, California, U.S.
- Genres: Traditional pop; jazz; R&B; easy listening; country; gospel
- Occupations: Singer, songwriter
- Works: Frankie Laine discography
- Years active: 1932–2007
- Labels: Mercury; Philips; Columbia; Capitol; ABC; Amos; Score
- Website: Archived January 23, 2018, at the Wayback Machine

Frankie Laine (born Francesco Paolo LoVecchio; March 30, 1913 – February 6, 2007) was an American singer and songwriter whose career spanned nearly 75 years, from his first concerts in 1930 with a marathon dance company to his final performance of "That's My Desire" in 2005. Often billed as "America's Number One Song Stylist", Laine's other nicknames include "Mr. Rhythm", "Old Leather Lungs", and "Mr. Steel Tonsils". His hits included "That's My Desire", "That Lucky Old Sun", "Mule Train", "Jezebel", "High Noon", "I Believe", "Hey Joe!", "The Kid's Last Fight", "Cool Water", "Rawhide", and "You Gave Me a Mountain".

Laine sang well known theme songs for many Western film soundtracks, including 3:10 To Yuma, Gunfight at the O.K. Corral, and Blazing Saddles, although his recordings were not charted as country and western. Laine sang an eclectic variety of song styles and genres, stretching from big band crooning to pop, western-themed songs, gospel, rock, folk, jazz, and blues. He did not sing the soundtrack song for High Noon, which was sung by Tex Ritter, but his own version (with somewhat altered lyrics, omitting the name of the antagonist, Frank Miller) was the one that became a bigger hit. Laine also did not sing the theme to another show he is commonly associated with—Champion the Wonder Horse (sung by Mike Stewart)—but released his own, subsequently more popular, version.

Laine's enduring popularity was illustrated in June 2011 when a TV-advertised compilation called Hits reached No. 16 on the UK Albums Chart. The accomplishment was achieved nearly 60 years after his debut on the U.K. chart, 64 years after his first major U.S. hit and four years after his death.

== Early life ==
Frankie Laine was born Francesco Paolo LoVecchio on March 30, 1913, to Giovanni and Crescenzia LoVecchio (née Salerno). His Cook County, Illinois, birth certificate (No. 14436) was already Americanized at the time of his birth, with his name written as "Frank Lovecchio", his mother as "Anna Salerno", and his father as "John Lovecchio", with the "V" lower case in each instance, except in the "Reported by" section with "John Lo Vecchio (father)" written in. His parents had emigrated from Monreale, Sicily, to Chicago's Near West Side, in "Little Italy", where his father worked at one time as the personal barber for gangster Al Capone. Laine's family appears to have had several organized crime connections, and young Francesco was living with his grandfather when the latter was killed by rival gangsters.

The eldest of eight children, Laine grew up in the Old Town neighborhood (first at 1446 N. North Park Avenue and later at 331 W. Schiller Street) and had his first taste of singing as a member of the choir in the Church of the Immaculate Conception's elementary school across the street from the North Park Avenue home. Laine later attended Lane Technical High School, where he helped to develop his lung power and breath control by joining the track and field and basketball teams. Laine realized he wanted to be a singer when he missed time in school to see Al Jolson's current talking picture, The Singing Fool. Jolson would later visit Laine when both were filming pictures in 1949, and around this time, Jolson remarked that Laine was going to put all the other singers out of business.

== Early career and stylistic influences ==
As early as the 1920s, Laine's vocal abilities were enough to get him noticed by the slightly older "in crowd" at his school, who began inviting him to parties and to local dance clubs such as Chicago's Merry Garden Ballroom. At 17, Laine sang before a crowd of 5,000 at The Merry Garden Ballroom to such applause that he ended up performing five encores on his first night. Laine was giving dance lessons for a charity ball at the Merry Garden when he was called to the bandstand to sing:

Soon I found myself on the main bandstand before this enormous crowd, Laine recalled. I was really nervous, but I started singing 'Beside an Open Fireplace,' a popular song of the day. It was a sentimental tune and the lyrics choked me up. When I got done, the tears were streaming down my cheeks and the ballroom became quiet. I was very nearsighted and couldn't see the audience. I thought that the people didn't like me.

Some of Laine's other early influences during this period included Enrico Caruso, Carlo Buti, and especially Bessie Smith—a record of whose somehow wound up in his parents' collection:

I can still close my eyes and visualize its blue and purple label. It was a Bessie Smith recording of 'The Bleeding Hearted Blues,' with 'Midnight Blues' on the other side. The first time I laid the needle down on that record I felt cold chills and an indescribable excitement. It was my first exposure to jazz and the blues, although I had no idea at the time what to call those magical sounds. I just knew I had to hear more of them! — Frankie Laine

Another singer who influenced Laine at this time was the singer-songwriter Gene Austin, generally considered the first "crooner". Laine worked after school at a drugstore that was situated across the street from a record store that continually played hit records by Austin over their loudspeakers. He would swab down the windows in time to Austin's songs. Many years later, Laine related the story to Austin when both were guests on the popular television variety show Shower of Stars. Laine would also co-star in a film, Rainbow 'Round My Shoulder, with Austin's daughter, Charlotte.

Shortly after graduating from high school, Laine signed on as a member of The Merry Garden's marathon dance company and toured with them, working dance marathons during the Great Depression (setting the world record of 3,501 hours with partner Ruthie Smith at Atlantic City's Million Dollar Pier in 1932). Still billed as Frank LoVecchio, he would entertain the spectators during the 15-minute breaks the dancers were given each hour. During his marathon days, Laine worked with several up-and-coming entertainers, including Rose Marie, Red Skelton, and a 14-year-old, Anita O'Day, for whom he served as a mentor (as noted by Laine in a 1998 interview by David Miller).

Other artists whose styles began to influence Laine at this time were Bing Crosby, Louis Armstrong (as a trumpet player), Billie Holiday, Mildred Bailey, and, later, Nat King Cole. Laine befriended Cole in Los Angeles, when the latter's career was just beginning to gain momentum. Cole recorded a song, "It Only Happens Once", that fledgling songwriter Laine had composed. They remained close friends throughout the remainder of Cole's life, and Laine was one of the pallbearers at Cole's funeral.

In 1937, Laine replaced Perry Como in the Freddy Carlone band in Cleveland; Como made a call to Carlone about Laine. Como was another lifelong friend of Laine's, who once lent him the money to travel to a possible gig.

Laine's rhythmic style was ill-suited to the sweet sounds of the Carlone band, and the two soon parted company. Success continued to elude Laine, and he spent the next 10 years "scuffling": alternating between singing at small jazz clubs on both coasts and a series of jobs, including those of a bouncer, dance instructor, used car salesman, agent, synthetic leather factory worker, and machinist at a defense plant. It was while working at the defense plant during the Second World War that he first began writing songs ("It Only Happens Once" was written at the plant). Often homeless during his "scuffling" phases, Laine hit the lowest point of his career, when he was sleeping on a bench in Central Park.

I would sneak into hotel rooms and sleep on the floor. In fact, I was bodily thrown out of 11 different New York hotels. I stayed in YMCAs and with anyone who would let me flop. Eventually I was down to my last four cents, and my bed became a roughened wooden bench in Central Park. I used my four pennies to buy four tiny Baby Ruth candy bars and rationed myself to one a day. — Frankie Laine

Laine changed his professional name to Frankie Laine in 1938, upon receiving a job singing for the New York City radio station WINS. The program director, Jack Coombs, thought that "LoVecchio" was "too foreign sounding, and too much of a mouthful for the studio announcers," so he Americanized it to "Lane", an homage to his high school. He added the "i" to avoid confusion with a girl singer at the station who went by the name of Frances Lane. It was at this time that Laine got unknown singer Helen O'Connell her job with the Jimmy Dorsey band. WINS, deciding that they no longer needed a jazz singer, dropped him. With the help of bandleader Jean Goldkette, he got a job with a sustainer (non-sponsored) radio show at NBC. As he was about to start, Germany attacked Poland, and all sustainer broadcasts were pulled off the air in deference to the needs of the military.

Laine next found employment in a munitions plant, at a salary of $150.00 a week. He quit singing for what was perhaps the fifth or sixth time of his already long career. While working at the plant, Laine met a trio of female singers and became engaged to the lead singer. The group had been noticed by Johnny Mercer's Capitol Records and convinced Laine to head out to Hollywood with them as their agent.

In 1943, Laine moved to California, where he sang in the background of several films, including The Harvey Girls, and dubbed the singing voice for an actor in the Danny Kaye comedy The Kid from Brooklyn. It was in Los Angeles in 1944 that he met and befriended disc jockey Al Jarvis and composer/pianist Carl T. Fischer, the latter of whom was to be his songwriting partner, musical director, and piano accompanist until his death in 1954. Their songwriting collaborations included "I'd Give My Life," "Baby, Just For Me," "What Could Be Sweeter?," "Forever More," and the jazz standard "We'll Be Together Again."

When the war ended, Laine soon found himself "scuffling" again, and was eventually given a place to stay by Jarvis. Jarvis also did his best to help promote the struggling singer's career, and Laine soon had a small, regional following. In the meantime, Laine would make the rounds of the bigger jazz clubs, hoping that the featured band would call him up to perform a number with them. In late 1946, Hoagy Carmichael heard him singing at Billy Berg's club in Los Angeles, and this was when success finally arrived. Not knowing that Carmichael was in the audience, Laine sang the Carmichael-penned standard "Rockin' Chair" when Slim Gaillard called him up to the stage to sing. This eventually led to a contract with the newly established Mercury records. Laine and Carmichael would later collaborate on a song, "Put Yourself in My Place, Baby".

== First recordings ==
Laine cut his first record in 1944 for the fledgling Bel-Tone Records. The sides included "In the Wee Small Hours of the Morning" (an uptempo song not to be confused with "In the Wee Small Hours of the Morning" by Frank Sinatra), and a wartime propaganda tune titled "Brother, That's Liberty". However, the record failed to make much of an impression. The label soon folded, and Laine was picked up by Atlas Records, a "race label" that initially hired him to imitate his friend Nat "King" Cole. Cole would occasionally "moonlight" for other labels, under pseudonyms, while under contract to Capitol, and as he had previously recorded some sides for Atlas, they reasoned that fans would assume that "Frankie Laine" was yet another pseudonym for "Cole".

Laine cut his first two numbers for Atlas in the King mode, backed by R&B artist Johnny Moore's group, The Three Blazers which featured Charles Brown and Cole's guitarist (from "The King Cole Trio"), Oscar Moore. The ruse worked and the record sold moderately well, although limited to the "race" market. Laine cut the remainder of his songs for Atlas in his own style, including standards such as "Roses of Picardy" and "Moonlight in Vermont".

It was also at this time that Laine recorded a single for Mercury Records: "Pickle in the Middle with the Mustard on Top" and "I May Be Wrong (But I Think You're Wonderful)." He appears only as a character actor on the first side, which features the comedic singing of Artie Auerbach (a.k.a., "Mr. Kitzel") who was a featured player on the Jack Benny radio show. In it, Laine plays a peanut vendor at a ball game and can be heard shouting out lines like "It's a munchy, crunchy bag of lunchy!" The flip side features Laine and is a jazzy version of an old standard done as a rhythm number. It was played by Laine's friend, disc jockey Al Jarvis, and gained the singer a small West Coast following.

== First successes ==
Even after his discovery by Carmichael, Laine still was considered only an intermission act at Billy Berg's. He reached his first independent success when he dusted off a fifteen-year-old song that few people remembered in 1946, "That's My Desire". Laine had picked up the song from singer June Hart a half a dozen years earlier, when he sang at the College Inn in Cleveland. He introduced "Desire" as a "new" song—meaning new to his repertoire at Berg's—but the audience mistook it for a new song that had just been written. He ended up singing it five times that night. After that, Laine quickly became the star attraction at Berg's, and record company executives took note.

Laine soon had patrons lining up to hear him sing "Desire"; among them was R&B artist Hadda Brooks, known for her boogie woogie piano playing. She listened to him every night, and eventually cut her own version of the song, which became a hit on the "Harlem" charts. "I liked the way he did it" Brooks recalled; "he sings with soul, he sings the way he feels."

Laine was soon recording for the fledgling Mercury label, and "That's My Desire" was one of the songs cut in his first recording session there. It quickly took the No. 3 spot on the R&B chart, and listeners initially thought Laine was black.

The record also made it to the No. 4 spot on the mainstream chart. Although it was quickly covered by many other artists, including Sammy Kaye who took it to the No. 2 spot, it was Laine's version that became the standard.

"Desire" became Laine's first gold record having sold over one million copies, and established him in the music world. He had been over $7,000 in debt, on the day before he recorded this song." His first paycheck for royalties was over five times this amount. Laine paid off all of his debts except one—fellow singer Perry Como refused to let Laine pay him back, and would kid him about the money owed for years to come. The loan to Laine during the time when both men were still struggling singers was one of the few secrets Como kept from his wife, Roselle, who learned of it many years later. A series of hit singles quickly followed, including "Black and Blue", "Mam'selle", "Two Loves Have I", "Shine", "On the Sunny Side of the Street", "Monday Again", and many others.

== Style ==
Originally a rhythm and blues-influenced jazz singer, Laine later branched out into a number of genres, including popular standards, gospel, folk, country, western/Americana, rock 'n' roll, and the occasional novelty number. He was also known as Mr. Rhythm for his driving jazzy style.

Laine was part of a new breed of singers who rose to prominence in the post–World War II era. This new, raw, emotionally charged style seemed at the time to signal the end of the previous era's singing styles and was, indeed, a harbinger of the rock 'n' roll music that was to come. As music historian Jonny Whiteside wrote:

In the Hollywood clubs, a new breed of performers laid down a baffling hip array of new sounds...Most important of all these, though, was Frankie Laine, a big lad with 'steel tonsils' who belted out torch blues while stomping his size twelve foot in joints like Billy Berg's, Club Hangover and the Bandbox...Laine's intense vocal style owed nothing to Crosby, Sinatra, or Dick Haymes. Instead he drew from Billy Eckstine, Big Joe Turner, Jimmy Rushing, and with it Laine had sown the seeds from which an entire new perception and audience would grow...Frank Sinatra represented perhaps the highest flowering of a quarter century tradition of crooning but suddenly found himself an anachronism. First Frankie Laine, then Tony Bennett, and now Johnnie (Ray), dubbed 'the Belters' and 'the Exciters,' came along with a brash vibrancy and vulgar beat that made the old bandstand routine which Frank meticulously perfected seem almost invalid.

In the words of Jazz critic Richard Grudens:

Frank's style was very innovative, which was why he had such difficulty with early acceptance. He would bend notes and sing about the chordal context of a note rather than to sing the note directly, and he stressed each rhythmic downbeat, which was different from the smooth balladeer of his time.

Laine's 1946 recording of "That's My Desire" remains a landmark record signaling the end of both the dominance of the big bands and the crooning styles favored by contemporary Dick Haymes and others. Often called the first of the blue-eyed soul singers, Laine's style cleared the way for many artists who arose in the late 1940s and early 1950s, including Kay Starr, Tony Bennett, and Johnnie Ray.

I think that Frank probably was one of the forerunner of...blues, of...rock 'n' roll. A lot of singers who sing with a passionate demeanor—Frank was and is definitely that. I always used to love to mimic him with 'That's...my...desire.' And then later Johnnie Ray came along that made all of those kind of movements, but Frank had already done them. – Patti Page

Throughout the 1950s, Laine enjoyed a second career singing the title songs over the opening credits of Hollywood films and television shows, including Gunfight at the O.K. Corral, 3:10 to Yuma, Bullwhip, and Rawhide. His rendition of the title song for Mel Brooks's 1974 hit movie Blazing Saddles won an Oscar nomination for Best Song, and on television, Laine's featured recording of "Rawhide" for the series of the same name became a popular theme song.

You can't categorize him. He's one of those singers that's not in one track. And yet and still I think that his records had more excitement and life into it. And I think that was his big selling point, that he was so full of energy. You know when you hear his records it was dynamite energy. — Herb Jeffries

== Late 1940s to early 1950s ==
Laine was a jazz singer in the late 1940s. Accompanied by Carl Fischer and some of the best jazz men in the business, he was singing standards like "By the River Sainte Marie", "Black and Blue", "Rockin' Chair", "West End Blues", "At the End of the Road", "Ain't That Just Like a Woman", "That Ain't Right", "Exactly Like You", "Shine" and "Sleepy Ol' River" on the Mercury label.

Laine enjoyed his greatest success after impresario Mitch Miller, who became the A&R man at Mercury in 1948, recognized a universal quality in his voice that led to a succession of chart-topping popular songs, often with a folk or western flavor. Laine and Miller became a formidable hit-making team whose first collaboration, "That Lucky Old Sun", became the number one song in the country three weeks after its release. It was also Laine's fifth Gold record. "That Lucky Old Sun" was something new to the musical scene in 1949: a folk spiritual which, as interpreted by Laine, became both an affirmation of faith and a working man's wish to bring his earthly sufferings to an end.

The song was knocked down to the number two position by Laine and Miller's second collaboration, "Mule Train", which proved an even bigger hit, making Laine the first artist to hold the Number One and Two positions simultaneously. "Mule Train", with its whip cracks and echo, has been cited as the first song to use an "aural texture" that "set the pattern for virtually the entire first decade of rock."

"Mule Train" represents a second direction in which Laine's music would be simultaneously heading under the guidance of Mitch Miller: as the voice of the great outdoors and the American West. "Mule Train" is a slice of life in the mid-19th century West in which the contents of the packages being delivered by the mule train provide a snapshot into frontier life: "There's some cotton, thread and needles for the folks a-way up yonder/A shovel for a miner who left his home to wander/Some rheumatism pills for the settlers in the hills."

The collaboration produced a run of top forty hits that lasted into the early years of the rock and roll era. Other hits included "Dream a Little Dream of Me", "Stars and Stripes Forever", "The Cry of the Wild Goose", "Swamp Girl", "Satan Wears a Satin Gown", and "Music, Maestro Please".

"Shine", written in 1910 by Cecil Mack (R.C. McPherson), a ground-breaking African-American songwriter and publisher, was believed to be based on a real-life friend of vaudevillian George Walker, who was with him during the New York City race riots of 1900. The song takes what was then an ethnic slur, "shine", and turns it into something to be proud of. It had been a hit for Laine's idol Louis Armstrong, who would cover several of Laine's hits as well.

"Satan Wears a Satin Gown" is the prototype of another recurring motif in Laine's oeuvre, the "Lorelei" or "Jezebel" song (both of which would be the titles of later Laine records). The song, which has a loosely structured melody that switches in tone and rhythm throughout, was pitched to Laine by a young song plugger, Tony Benedetto, who would later go on to achieve success as Tony Bennett. Laine recognized the younger singer's talent, and gave him encouragement.

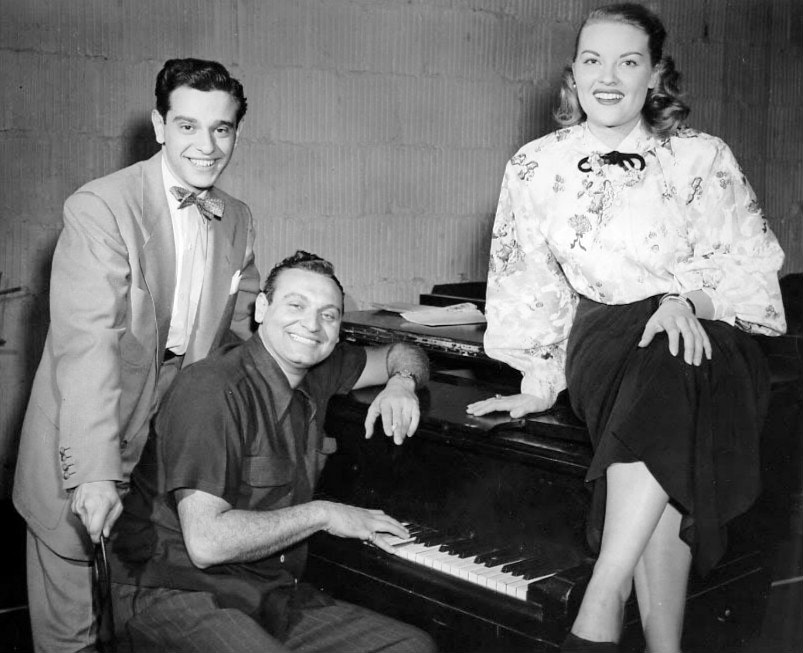
Laine and Patti Page, circa 1950s.

"Swamp Girl" is another entry with the "Lorelei"/"Jezebel" motif in the Laine songbook. In this decidedly gothic tale of a ghostly female spirit who inhabits a metaphorical "swamp", the femme fatale attempts to lure the singer to his death, calling "Come to the deep where your sleep is without a dream." The swamp girl is voiced (in an obligato) by coloratura Loulie Jean Norman, who would later go on to provide a similar vocal for the theme song of the television series Star Trek. The coloratura contrasts well with Laine's rough, masculine voice, and disembodied female voices would continue to appear in the background of many of his records, to great effect.

"The Cry of the Wild Goose" would be Laine's last number one hit on the American charts. It was written by folksinger Terry Gilkyson, of The Easy Riders fame. Gilkyson would write many more songs for Laine over the next decade, and he and The Easy Riders would back him on the hit single, "Love Is a Golden Ring". "The Cry of the Wild Goose" falls into the "voice of the great outdoors" category of Laine songs, with the opening line of its chorus, "My heart knows what the wild goose knows", becoming a part of the American lexicon.

Laine's influence on today's music can be clearly evidenced in his rendition of the Hoagy Carmichael standard, "Georgia on My Mind." Laine's slow, soulful version was a model for the iconic remake by Ray Charles a decade later. Charles would follow up "Georgia" with remakes of other Frankie Laine hits, including "Your Cheatin' Heart", and "That Lucky Old Sun." (Elvis Presley also remade several of Laine's hits, and his early influence on The Beatles has been well documented.)

In an interview, Mitch Miller described the basis of Laine's appeal:

He was my kind of guy. He was very dramatic in his singing...and you must remember that in those days there were no videos so you had to depend on the image that the record made in the listener's ears. And that's why many fine artists were not good record sellers. For instance, Lena Horne. Fabulous artist but she never sold many records till that last album of hers. But she would always sell out the house no matter where she was. And there were others who sold a lot of records but couldn't get to first base in personal appearances, but Frankie had it both. — Mitch Miller

The biggest record label at this time was Columbia Records, and in 1950 Miller left Mercury to embark upon his phenomenally successful career as the A&R man there. Laine's contract at Mercury would be up for renewal the following year, and Miller soon brought Laine to Columbia as well. Laine's contract with Columbia was the most lucrative in the industry until RCA bought Elvis Presley's contract five years later.

== Starring with Columbia ==
Laine began recording for Columbia Records in 1951, where he immediately scored a double-sided hit with the single "Jezebel" (No. 2)/"Rose, Rose, I Love You" (No. 3). Other Laine hits from this period include "High Noon (Do Not Forsake Me)" (No. 5), "Jealousy (Jalousie)" (No. 3), "The Girl in the Wood" (No. 23), "When You're in Love" (No. 30), "Way Down Yonder in New Orleans" (with Jo Stafford) (No. 26), "Your Cheatin' Heart" (No. 18), "Granada" (No. 17), "Hey Joe!" (No. 6), "The Kid's Last Fight" (No. 20), "Cool Water", "Some Day" (No. 14), "A Woman in Love" (No. 19), "Love Is a Golden Ring" (with The Easy Riders) (No. 10), and "Moonlight Gambler" (No. 3).

One of the signature songs of the early 1950s, "Jezebel" takes the "Lorelei" motif to its end, with Laine shouting "Jezebel!" at the woman who has destroyed him. In Laine's words, the song uses "flamenco rhythms to whip up an atmosphere of sexual frustration and hatred while a guy berated the woman who'd done him wrong."

"High Noon" was the theme song from the western motion picture starring Gary Cooper and Grace Kelly. It had been sung by cowboy star Tex Ritter in the film, but it was Laine's recording that became the big hit. From this point on, Laine would sing the theme songs over the opening credits of many Hollywood and television westerns, becoming so identified with these title songs that Mel Brooks would hire him to sing the theme song for his classic cult film western spoof Blazing Saddles.

At this time, Laine had become more popular in the United Kingdom than in the US, as many of his hit records in the UK were only minor hits in his native country. Songs like "The Gandy Dancer's Ball", "The Rock of Gibraltar", and "Answer Me, O Lord" were much bigger hits for him abroad. "Answer Me" would later provide the inspiration for Paul McCartney's composition "Yesterday". It was also there that he broke attendance records when appearing at the Palladium, where he launched his first successful television series (with singer Connie Haines).

Mitch Miller teamed Laine with many of Mercury and Columbia's biggest artists. He scored hits with Patti Page ("I Love You for That") at Mercury, Doris Day ("Sugarbush"), Jo Stafford ("Hey Good Lookin'", "Gambella (The Gambling Lady)", "Hambone", "Floatin' Down to Cotton Town", "Settin' the Woods on Fire", and many others), Jimmy Boyd ("Tell Me a Story", "The Little Boy and the Old Man"), the Four Lads ("Rain, Rain, Rain") and Johnnie Ray ("Up Above My Head (I Hear Music in the Air)").

Laine scored a total of 39 hit records on the charts while at Columbia, and many of his songs from this period are most readily associated with him. His Greatest Hits album, released in 1957, has been a perennial best seller that has never gone out of print. His songs at Columbia included everything from pop and jazz standards, novelties, gospel, spirituals, R&B numbers, country, western, folk, rock 'n' roll, calypso, foreign language, children's music, film and television themes, tangos, light operetta. His vocal style could range anywhere from shouting out lines to rhythm numbers to romantic ballads.

Both in collaboration with Jo Stafford and as a solo artist, Laine was one of the earliest, and most frequent, Columbia artists to bring country numbers into the mainstream. Late in his career, Laine would go on to record two straight country albums ("A Country Laine" and "The Nashville Connection") that would fully demonstrate his ability to inflect multiple levels of emotional nuances into a line or word. Many of his pop-country hits from the early 1950s featured the steel guitar playing of Speedy West (who played a custom-built, three-neck, four-pedal model).

Laine's duets with Doris Day were folk-pop adaptations of traditional South African folk songs, translated by folk singer Josef Marais. Marais would also provide Laine and Jo Stafford with a similar translation of a song which Stafford seems to have particularly disliked called "Chow Willy". Although "Sugarbush" brought Laine & Day a gold record, they would never team up again.

In 1953, Laine set two more records (this time on the UK charts): weeks at No. 1 for a song ("I Believe", which held the number one spot for 18 weeks), and weeks at No. 1 for an artist in a single year (27 weeks), when "Hey Joe!" and "Answer Me, O Lord" became number one hits as well). In spite of the popularity of rock and roll artists such as Elvis Presley and The Beatles, fifty-plus years later, both of Laine's records still hold.

In 1954, Laine gave a Royal Command Performance for Queen Elizabeth II which he cited as one of the highlights of his career. By the end of the decade, he remained far ahead of Elvis Presley as the most successful artist on the British charts. "I Believe" is listed as the second most popular song of all time on the British charts as well.

"I Believe" marked yet another direction for Laine's music, that of the spiritual. A devout Roman Catholic from childhood, Laine would continue to record songs of faith and inspiration throughout his career; beginning with his rocking gospel album with the Four Lads, which, along with the hit song "Rain, Rain, Rain", included renditions of such songs as "Remember Me", "Didn't He Moan", "I Feel Like My Time Ain't Long", and "I Hear the Angels Singing." Other Laine spirituals would include "My Friend", "In the Beginning", "Make Me a Child Again", "My God and I", and "Hey! Hey! Jesus."

=== Mr. Rhythm ===
In 1953, Laine recorded his first long playing album that was released, domestically, solely as an album (prior to this his albums had been compiled from previously released singles). The album was titled "Mr. Rhythm", as Laine was often known at that time, and featured many jazz-flavored, rhythm numbers similar in style to his work on the Mercury label. The album's songlist was made up of "Great American Songbook" standards. The tracks were "Some Day, Sweetheart", "A Hundred Years from Today", "Laughing at Life", "Lullaby in Rhythm", "Willow, Weep for Me", "My Ohio Home", "Judy" and "After You've Gone." The final number features a rare vocal duet with his accompanist/musical director, Carl Fischer. Paul Weston's orchestra provided the music.

=== Portrait of New Orleans ===
Released as a 10" in 1953, and a 12" in 1954, this album features the talents of Laine, Jo Stafford and bandleader Paul Weston, a Tommy Dorsey alumnus who led one of the top bands of the 1950s, and was the husband of Stafford. The album was a mix of solo recordings and duets by the two stars, and of new and previously released material, including Stafford's hits single, "Make Love to Me", "Shrimp Boats", and "Jambalaya." Laine and Stafford duetted on "Way Down Yonder in New Orleans", "Floatin' Down to Cotton Town", and "Basin Street Blues"; and Laine soloed on "New Orleans" (not to be confused with "New Orleans" a.k.a. "The House of the Rising Sun" which Laine later recorded), "Do You Know What It Means to Miss New Orleans?", and "When It's Sleepy Time Down South", along with a pair of cuts taken from his "Mr. Rhythm" album.

=== Jazz Spectacular ===
This album featured not only jazz vocals by Laine, but jazz licks on trumpet by a former featured player in the Count Basie orchestra, Buck Clayton, and trombonists J. J. Johnson and Kai Winding, and piano by Sir Charles Thompson. The tracks included several songs that had long been a standard part of the Laine repertoire over the years: "Sposin'", "Baby, Baby, All the Time", and "Roses of Picardy" along with standards such as "Stars Fell on Alabama", "That Old Feeling", and "Taking a Chance on Love". The album proved popular with jazz and popular music fans, and was often cited by Laine as his personal favorite. An improvised tone is apparent throughout, with Laine at one point reminiscing with Sir Charles Thompson about the days they performed together at Billy Berg's.

=== Frankie Laine and the Four Lads ===
The Four Lads (Bernie Toorish, Jimmy Arnold, Frank Busseri and Connie Codarini) were a Canadian-based group, who first gained fame as the backup singer on Johnnie Ray's early chart-busters ("Cry", "The Little White Cloud that Cried"), but garnered a following of their own with songs such as "The Mocking Bird", and "Istanbul (Not Constantinople)". The album produced one hit, "Rain! Rain! Rain!", along with tracks such as "Remember Me", "I Feel That My Time Ain't Long", and "Didn't He Moan". The last four tracks were recorded during a later session.

=== Rockin' ===
One of Laine's most popular albums, this album reset several of his former hits in a driving, brassy orchestration by Paul Weston and his orchestra. Two of the remakes ("That Lucky Old Sun" and "We'll Be Together Again") have gone on to become the best-known versions of the songs (supplanting the original hit versions). Other songs on this album include: "Rockin' Chair", "By the River Sainte Marie", "Black and Blue", "Blue Turning Grey Over You", "Shine", and "West End Blues". The album's title is less a reference to rock and roll than a reference to the Duke Ellington song of that same name. Unlike Mitch Miller, Laine liked the new musical form known as "rock 'n' roll", and was anxious to try his hand at it.

=== With Michel Legrand ===
French composer/arranger Michel Legrand teamed up with Laine to record a pair of albums in 1958. The first, A Foreign Affair, was built around the concept of recording the tracks in different languages: English, French, Spanish, and Portuguese. The album produced a pair of international hits: "La Paloma" in Argentina, and "Não tem solucão" in Brazil. Other tracks included "Mona Lisa", "Mam'selle", "Torna a Sorriento", "Besame Mucho", and "Autumn Leaves."

Laine and Legrand teamed up for a second album of jazz standards, titled Reunion in Rhythm, with the vocals limiting themselves to English (and an occasional segue into French). Laine sang the complete lyrics (including the rarely reprised introductions) to such favorites as "Blue Moon", "Lover, Come Back to Me", "Marie", "September in the Rain", "Dream a Little Dream of Me" "I Would Do Most Anything for You", "Too Marvelous for Words", and "I Forget the Time". André Previn was the studio pianist on "I'm Confessin'", "Baby Just For Me," "You're Just The Kind," and "I Forget The Time."

=== With Frank Comstock ===
Laine wrote the lyrics for the title song on another 1958 album, Torchin', which was also his first recorded in stereo. He was backed by trombonist Frank Comstock's orchestra, on a dozen classic torch songs including: "A Cottage for Sale", "I Cover the Waterfront", "You've Changed", "These Foolish Things", "I Got it Bad (And That Ain't Good)", "It's the Talk of the Town", and "Body and Soul". As with his Legrand album, he sings the entire lyric for each song.

A second collaboration with Comstock, also recorded in 1958, focused on intimacy. Conceived as a love letter to his second wife, actress Nan Grey (who appears on the cover with him), You Are My Love is easily Laine's most romantic work. His voice was once described (by a British disk jockey) as having "the virility of a goat and the delicacy of a flower petal," and both these elements are well showcased here (particularly the delicate nuances). His recording of the wedding standard, "Because", exemplifies the singer's delicate mode at its most exquisite. He opens the song a cappella, after which a classical, acoustic guitar joins him, with the full orchestra gradually fading in and out before the guitar only climax. Also among the love ballads on this album are versions of: "I Married an Angel", "To My Wife", "Try a Little Tenderness", "Side by Side", and a version of "The Touch of Your Lips".

=== Balladeer ===
Recorded in 1959, "Balladeer" was a folk-blues album. Laine had helped pioneer the folk music movement a full ten years earlier with his hit folk-pop records penned by Terry Gilkyson et al.. This album was orchestrated and arranged by Fred Katz (who had brought Laine "Satan Wears a Satin Gown") and Frank DeVol. Laine and Katz collaborated on some of the new material, along with Lucy Drucker (who apparently inspired the "Lucy D" in one of the songs). Other songs are by folk, country and blues artists such as Brownie McGhee, James A. Bland, Huddie "Leadbelly" Ledbetter, and Hungarian composer Rudolf Friml. The closing track, "And Doesn't She Roll" (co-written by Laine), with its rhythmic counter-chorus in the background foretells Paul Simon's Graceland album two decades later.

Included are renditions of "Rocks and Gravel", "Careless Love", "Sixteen Tons", "The Jelly Coal Man", "On a Monday", "Lucy D" (a melody that sounds like the later Simon & Garfunkel hit, "Scarborough Fair", but depicts the murder of a beautiful young woman by her unrequited lover), "Carry Me Back to Old Virginny", "Stack of Blues", "Old Blue", "Cherry Red", and "New Orleans" (better known as "The House of the Rising Sun"), which would become a hit for the British rock group, The Animals a few years later.

=== John Williams arrangements ===
Laine's last four albums at Columbia, Hell Bent for Leather!, Deuces Wild, Call of the Wild, and Wanderlust. were arranged by a young John Williams. Williams recently said the following words about Laine:

Frankie Laine was somebody that everybody knew. He was a kind of a household word like Frank Sinatra or Bobby Darin or Peggy Lee or Ella Fitzgerald—Frankie Laine was one of the great popular singers and stylists of that time...And his style...he was one of those artists who had such a unique stamp—nobody sounded like he did. You could hear two notes and you knew who it was and you were right on the beam with it right away. And of course that defines a successful popular artist, at least at that time. These people were all uniquely individual and Frank was on the front rank of those people in his appeal to the public and his success and certainly in his identifiability. — John Williams.

=== Hell Bent for Leather! ===
This album of western classics by Laine established him as "a cowboy singer" for many young fans who grew up in the 1960s. The album's title is taken from a line in the popular television theme song Laine recorded for the popular Eric Fleming/Clint Eastwood western, Rawhide, which appears on the album. The tracks include stereo remakes of several of his biggest western/great outdoors hits: "The Cry of the Wild Goose", "Mule Train", "Gunfight at O.K. Corral", and "The 3:10 to Yuma", as well as new material, including the western rocker, "Wanted Man", and a musical narrative, "Bowie Knife".

=== Deuces Wild ===
Laine's next album continued with the western theme (on several of the numbers), while following up on his last hit single, "Moonlight Gambler" (a stereo remake of which appears on the album). Most of the tracks of this album feature a gambling theme. "The Hard Way" is a story about a hard-luck case who is killed by a cannonball while fighting in the Civil War (for the Confederacy), only to wind up eternally shoveling coal in Hell. The second track is Stephen Foster's "Camptown Races" Other songs on this album include: "Luck Be a Lady" (from the hit musical Guys and Dolls), which Laine performed in an Off Broadway, touring company version of Get Rich Quick; "Horses and Women" (which Laine may have supplied the lyrics to); "Deuces Wild", for which Laine provided the lyrics, and "Dead Man's Hand."

=== Call of the Wild ===
This album continued to play up Chicago-born Laine's western image with songs such as "On the Trail", based on the composition by Ferde Grofé, and "Tumbling Tumbleweeds", written by one of the founding members of The Sons of the Pioneers", Bob Nolan. The majority of its tracks focus more, however, on "the great outdoors", with titles such as: "Song of the Open Road", "North to Alaska", "Beyond the Blue Horizon", "Rolling Stone", and "The New Frontier", which appears to show Laine's support of President John F. Kennedy. The arrangements on many of these songs have an almost classical feel to them, reflecting the classical training of John Williams, who would go on to conduct the Boston Pops for many years.

=== Wanderlust ===
Wanderlust was Laine's final album with Columbia Records. "De Glory Road" is one of both Laine's personal favorites. Other songs on this album include (Ghost) "Riders in the Sky" and a swinging version of Sigmund Romberg's Serenade, from the operetta, The Student Prince. Also included on this album is a version of "I Let Her Go"; an uncensored version of a song that figured prominently in his nightclub act, "On the Road to Mandalay", based on the poem by Rudyard Kipling; and a classic version of "Wagon Wheels" which he'd been singing (though not recording) as far back as his days with the Merry Garden Ballroom marathon dance company in the early 1930s.

Laine had met with Columbia officials to renew his contract on the day that John F. Kennedy was assassinated. The meeting was canceled, and neither Laine nor Columbia pressed to reschedule it.

== At Capitol, ABC, and beyond ==
In 1963 Laine left Columbia for Capitol Records, but during his two years there only produced one album and a handful of singles (mostly of an inspirational nature). He continued performing regularly at this time, including a South African tour.

After switching to ABC Records in the late 1960s, Laine found himself at the top of the charts again, beginning with the first song he recorded, "I'll Take Care of Your Cares". Written as a waltz in the mid-1920s, "Cares" had become the unofficial theme song of the Las Vegas call girls, but was virtually unknown outside of the Strip. Laine recorded a swinging version that made it to number 39 on the national and number 2 on the adult contemporary charts. A string of hits followed including "Making Memories", "You Wanted Someone to Play With", "Laura (What's He Got That I Ain't Got)", "To Each His Own", "I Found You", and "Lord, You Gave Me A Mountain" (which was written by Marty Robbins). The last song was a number one hit on the adult contemporary chart (No. 24 national), and proved that Laine was as big a hit-maker as ever. His last single to hit the Billboard Hot 100 chart (peaking at No. 86 national) was "Dammit Isn't God's Last Name".

Seeking greater artistic freedom, Laine left ABC for the much smaller Amos Records, where he cut two albums in a modern, rock-influenced vein. The first album contained contemporary versions of his greatest hits, such as "Your Cheatin' Heart", "That Lucky Old Sun", "I Believe", "Jezebel", "Shine", and "Moonlight Gambler." A re-recorded single of "On The Sunny Side Of The Street" reached the Cashbox "Looking Ahead" chart in 1970. His second album for Amos was called "A Brand New Day" and, along with the title song, was original material including "Mr. Bojangles", "Proud Mary", "Put Your Hand in the Hand", "My God and I", and "Talk About the Good Times". It is one of Frankie Laine's personal favorites.

Amos, which was soon to fold from lack of funds, could not adequately promote them at the time. However, they are still available through CD re-releases. After Amos folded, Laine started his own label, Score Records, which is still producing albums today.

== Film and television ==
Beginning in the late 1940s, Laine starred in over a half dozen backstage musicals, often playing himself; several of these were written and directed by a young Blake Edwards. The films were: Make Believe Ballroom – Columbia, 1949; When You're Smiling – Columbia, 1950; Sunny Side Of The Street – Columbia, 1951; Rainbow 'Round My Shoulder – Columbia, 1952; Bring Your Smile Along – Columbia, 1955; He Laughed Last – Columbia, 1956; and Meet Me in Las Vegas – MGM, 1956. The latter, a big budget MGM musical starring Cyd Charisse, features Laine performing Hell Hath No Fury.

Laine's films were very popular in the United Kingdom, but this success failed to establish him as a movie star in the United States.

On television, he hosted three variety shows: The Frankie Laine Hour in 1950, The Frankie Laine Show (with Connie Haines) 1954–55, and Frankie Laine Time in 1955–56. The latter was a summer replacement for The Arthur Godfrey Show that received a Primetime Emmy for Best Male Singer. Frankie Laine Time featured such guest stars as Ella Fitzgerald, Johnnie Ray, Georgia Gibbs, The Four Lads, Cab Calloway, Patti Page, Eddie Heywood, Duke Ellington, Boris Karloff, Patti Andrews, Joni James, Shirley MacLaine, Gene Krupa, Teresa Brewer, Jack Teagarden and Polly Bergen.

He had a different sound, you know and he had such emotion and heart. And of course you recognized Frankie, just like Sinatra had that sound that you'd always recognize. That's what made for hit records, as well as being a great singer. But you have to have a real special sound that never changes. He could do it all...but again, you always knew that it was Frankie Laine. — Connie Haines

Laine was a frequent guest star on various other shows of the time, including Shower of Stars, The Steve Allen Show, The Ed Sullivan Show, What's My Line? This Is Your Life, Bachelor Father, The Sinatra Show, The Walter Winchell Show, The Perry Como Show, The Garry Moore Show, Masquerade Party, The Mike Douglas Show, and American Bandstand. He was the mystery guest on the April 12, 1959, episode of What's My Line. Also in 1959 he made a guest appearance on Perry Mason in the title role as comedian Danny Ross in "The Case of the Jaded Joker."

In the 1960s, Laine continued appearing on variety shows such as Laugh-In, but took on several serious guest-starring roles in shows like Rawhide, and Burke's Law. His theme song for Rawhide proved to be popular and helped make the show, which starred Eric Fleming and launched the career of Clint Eastwood, a hit. Other TV series for which Laine sang the theme song included Gunslinger, The Misadventures of Sheriff Lobo, and Rango.

In 1974, Mel Brooks was looking for a "Frankie Laine-type singer" to perform the theme song for his Western spoof Blazing Saddles. As Brooks wrote in his autobiography, "Nobody could sing a whip-cracking Western song like the great Frankie Laine. So I said, 'Why not just ask Frankie Laine himself?'" However, as Laine wrote in his own autobiography, he didn't know the film was a comedy. "I thought I was doing a song for another High Noon, and I gave it my best dramatic reading."

In the late 1960s, Laine sang the commercial jingle for the "Manhandlers," a line of Campbell's soups marketed specifically to men. In 1976, Laine recorded The Beatles song, "Maxwell's Silver Hammer" for the documentary All This and World War II.

Laine performed at three Academy Awards ceremonies: 1950 (Mule Train), 1960 (The Hanging Tree), and 1975 (Blazing Saddles). Only the last two of these ceremonies were televised. In 1981, he performed a medley of his hits on American Bandstand's 30th Anniversary Special, where he received a standing ovation. Later appearances include Nashville Now, 1989 and My Music, 2006.

== Social activism ==
Along with opening the door for many R&B performers, Laine played a significant role in the civil rights movements of the 1950s and 1960s. When Nat King Cole's television show was unable to get a sponsor, Laine crossed the color line, becoming the first white artist to appear as a guest (forgoing his usual salary of $10,000 as Cole's show only paid scale). Many other top white singers followed suit, including Tony Bennett and Rosemary Clooney, but Cole's show still could not get enough sponsors to continue.

In 1965, Laine joined several African American artists who gave a free concert for Martin Luther King Jr.'s supporters during their Selma to Montgomery marches.

Laine, who had a strong appreciation of African American music, went so far as to record at least two songs that have being black as their subject matter, "Shine" and Fats Waller's "Black and Blue". Both were recorded early in his career at Mercury, and helped to contribute to the initial confusion among fans about his race.

Laine was also active in many charities as well, including Meals on Wheels and The Salvation Army. Among his charitable works were a series of local benefit concerts and his having organized a nationwide drive to provide "Shoes for the Homeless". He donated a large portion of his time and talent to many San Diego charities and homeless shelters, as well as the Salvation Army and St. Vincent de Paul Village. He was also an emeritus member of the board of directors for the Mercy Hospital Foundation.

== Personal life ==
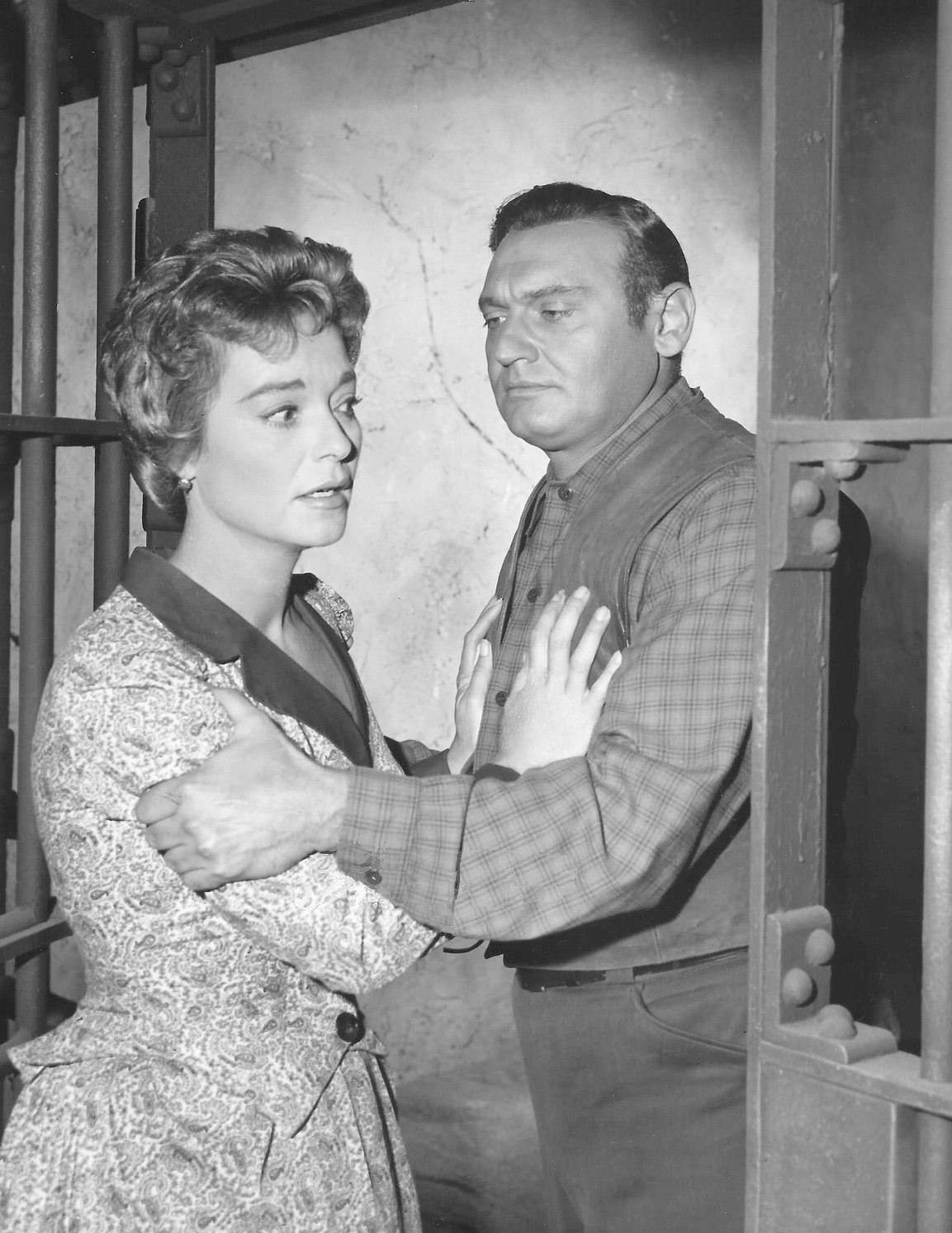
Nan Grey and Frankie Laine in a scene from Rawhide, 1960

Laine married actress Nan Grey (June 1950 – July 1993) and adopted her daughters Pam and Jan from a previous marriage to jockey Jackie Westrope. Their 43-year marriage lasted until her death. Laine and Grey guest-starred on a November 18, 1960, episode of Rawhide: "Incident on the Road to Yesterday." They played long-lost lovers. Following a three-year engagement to Anita Craighead, the 86-year-old singer married Marcia Ann Kline in June 1999. This marriage lasted for the remainder of his life.

== Later years ==
Laine settled on a hilltop in the Point Loma neighborhood of San Diego, where he was a supporter of local events and charities. In 2000, the San Diego Chamber of Commerce dubbed Laine "The Prince of Point Loma".

Laine's career slowed down a little in the 1980s due to triple and quadruple heart bypass surgeries, but he continued cutting albums, including Wheels Of A Dream (1998), Old Man Jazz (2002) and The Nashville Connection (2004).

In 1986, Laine recorded the album Round Up with Erich Kunzel and the Cincinnati Pops Orchestra, which made it to the classical charts. He was reportedly pleased and amused, having also placed songs on the rhythm & blues and popular charts in his time.

Laine recorded his last song, "Taps/My Buddy", shortly after the 9/11 terrorist attack on America. The song was dedicated to the New York City firefighters, and Laine stipulated that profits from the song were to be donated, in perpetuity, to the New York Fire Department.

On June 12, 1996, Laine was presented with a Lifetime Achievement Award at the 27th Annual Songwriters’ Hall of Fame awards ceremony at the New York Sheraton. On his 80th birthday, the United States Congress declared him to be a national treasure. Then, a decade later on March 30, 2003, Laine celebrated his 90th birthday, and several of his old friends, Herb Jeffries, Patti Page and Kay Starr, attended his birthday party in San Diego, helping him blow out the candles.

=== Final appearance and death ===
In 2006, Laine appeared on the PBS My Music special despite a recent stroke, performing "That's My Desire", and received a standing ovation. It was his last public performance.

Laine died of heart failure on February 6, 2007, at Scripps Mercy Hospital in San Diego, aged 93. A memorial mass was held six days later at the Immaculata parish church on the campus of the University of San Diego. On February 13, his ashes, along with those of his late wife Nan Grey, were scattered over the Pacific Ocean. The New York Times remembered Laine as "a singer who achieved enormous popularity in the 1940s and 50s with a robust voice and a string of hits including 'That’s My Desire,' 'Mule Train,' 'Ghost Riders in the Sky' and 'Jezebel.'"

== Legacy ==
While Laine's influence on popular music, rock and roll and soul is rarely acknowledged by rock historians, his early crossover success as a singer of "race music" not only helped pave the way for other white artists who sang in the black style, such as Kay Starr, Johnnie Ray and Elvis Presley, but also helped to increase public acceptance for African-American artists as well. Artists inspired and/or influenced by Laine include Ray Charles, Bobby Darin, Lou Rawls, The Kalin Twins, The Beatles, Tom Jones, James Brown, Billy Fury, and many others.

Laine was inducted into the Hit Parade Hall of Fame in 2008. Two years later, a Golden Palm Star on the Palm Springs, California, Walk of Stars was dedicated to him.

For his contributions to the music and television industry, Laine has two stars on the Hollywood Walk of Fame. The music star is at the north side of the 1600 block on Hollywood Boulevard, the television star is at the west side of the 1600 block on Vine Street.

== Discography ==
Studio albums

- Frankie Laine Sings
- Frankie Laine Favorites
- Songs from the Heart
- Frankie Laine
- Frankie Laine
- Frankie Laine
- Christmas Favorites
- Mr. Rhythm Sings
- Song Favourites by Frankie Laine
- Sunny Side of the Street
- Music, Maestro, Please
- With All My Heart
- One for My Baby
- A Musical Portrait of New Orleans
- Mr. Rhythm
- Jazz Spectacular
- Frankie Laine and the Four Lads
- Rockin'
- Foreign Affair
- Torchin'
- Reunion in Rhythm
- You Are My Love
- Frankie Laine, Balladeer
- Hell Bent for Leather!
- Deuces Wild
- Call of the Wild
- Wanderlust
- I Believe
- I'll Take Care of Your Cares
- I Wanted Someone to Love
- To Each His Own
- Take Me Back to Laine Country
- You Gave Me a Mountain
- A Brand New Day
- 20 Memories in Gold
- Life is Beautiful
- Place in Time
- Round-Up
- New Directions
- Reunion in Jazz
- The Wheels of a Dream
- It Ain't Over 'til It's Over
- The Story of Old Man Jazz and His Loves
- The Nashville Connection

== Lyrics by Laine ==
- "It Ain't Gonna Be Like That" (with Mel Tormé)
- "It Only Happens Once" (words and music by Laine)
- "Put Yourself In My Place" (with Hoagy Carmichael)
- "We'll Be Together Again" (with Carl T. Fischer)
- "Our Dream" (words and music)
- "I Haven't the Heart" (with Matt Dennis)
- "I'd Give My Life" (with Carl T. Fischer)
- "What Could Be Sweeter?" (with Carl T. Fischer)
- "Baby, Just for Me" (with Carl T. Fischer)
- "Satan Wears a Satin Gown" (with Jacques Wilson and Fred Katz)
- "Don't Cry Little Children" (with Norman Wallace)
- "When You're In Love" (with Carl T. Fischer)
- "Only If We Love" (with Al Lerner)
- "Torchin" (with Al Lerner)
- "The Love of Loves" (with Carl T. Fischer)
- "Magnificent Obsession" (with Fred Karger)
- "Forever More" (with Carl T. Fischer)
- "You Are My Love" (with Carl T. Fischer)
- "My Little Love" (with Carl Eugster)
- "And Doesn't She Roll" (with Jack Wilson and Fred Katz)
- "God Bless This House" (with Jack Wilson and Fred Katz)
- "Horses and Women" (words and music)
- "Deuces Wild" (with Mike Oatman and Ray Barr)
- "Cow-Cow Boogie" (with Don Raye, Gene DePaul and Benny Carter)
- "The High Road" (with Margaret Bristol and Leo Kempinski)
- "The Moment of Truth" (with Nell Western and Fred Katz)
- "What Am I Here For?" (with Duke Ellington)
- "Pretty Little Princess" (with Michael Nesmith)
- "Please Forgive Me" (with Larry Kusik and Eddie Snyder)
- "Silver Kisses and Golden Love" (with Robert Doyle)
- "Allegra" (with Matt Dennis and Dunham)
- "Fresh Out of Tears" (with Morgan)
- "The Secret of Happiness" (with Larry Kusik and Eddie Snyder)
- "If I Did Not Believe in You" (with Larry Kusik and Eddie Snyder)
- "Going to Newport" (with Larry Sanders)
- "Forevermore" (words and music)
- "End of Session Blues" (words and music)
- "Nan" (words and music)

== Filmography ==
=== Acting ===
- Make Believe Ballroom – Columbia, 1949
- When You're Smiling – Columbia, 1950
- Sunny Side of the Street – Columbia, 1951
- Rainbow 'Round My Shoulder – Columbia, 1952
- Bring Your Smile Along – Columbia, 1955
- He Laughed Last – Columbia, 1956
- Meet Me in Las Vegas – MGM, 1956

=== Sang title song ===
- Blowing Wild – Warner, 1953
- Man Without a Star – Universal, 1955
- Strange Lady in Town – Warner, 1955
- Gunfight at the O.K. Corral – Paramount, 1957
- 3:10 to Yuma – Columbia, 1957
- Bullwhip – Republic, 1958
- Blazing Saddles – Warner/Crossbow, 1974

=== Included in soundtrack ===
- The Last Picture Show – sang "Rose, Rose, I Love You", Columbia, 1971
- All This and World War II – sang "Maxwell's Silver Hammer", Deluxe, 1976
- House Calls – sang "On the Sunny Side of the Street", Universal, 1978
- Lemon Popsicle – sang "My Little One", 1978
- Going Steady – sang "My Little One", 1980
- Raging Bull – sang "That's My Desire", United Artists, 1980
- Whore – sang "The Love of Loves", 1991
- Chopper – sang "Don't Fence Me In", 2000

== Television ==
- The Frankie Laine Hour – 1950
- The Frankie Laine Show – 1954–55
- Frankie Laine Time – 1955–56
- Rawhide – 1959–66 (sang the theme song)
- Gunslinger – 1961 (sang the theme song)
- Rango – 1967 (sang the theme song, "Rango")
- The Misadventures of Sheriff Lobo – 1979–81 (sang the theme song for the first season)

=== Guest star appearances ===
- Perry Mason – CBS, 1959
- Make Room for Daddy – CBS, 1959
- Rawhide – CBS, 1960
- Bachelor Father – ABC, 1961
- Burke's Law – ABC, 1963
- Hee Haw – season 4 episodes 20 and 23 – syndication, 1973

== Biographies ==
- Grudens, Richard (2009). Mr. Rhythm-A Tribute to Frankie Laine. Celebrity Profiles Publishing. ISBN 978-0976387763.
- Cronbaugh, Craig (2005). Reaching for a Star: A Memoir of My Life, My Music, and My Friendship with Famed Singer Frankie Laine. AuthorHouse. ISBN 978-1420803907.
- Laine, Frankie (1993). That Lucky Old Son: The Autobiography of Frankie Laine. With Joseph F. Laredo. Pathfinder Publishing of California. ISBN 0-934793-45-X.

=== Video documentary ===
Frankie Laine: An American Dreamer, 2003. Narrated by Lou Rawls. Included are interviews with Patti Page, Kay Starr, Pat Boone, Clint Eastwood, Tom Jones, Howard Keel, Connie Haines, John Williams, Michel Legrand, Mitch Miller, Ringo Starr, Dick Clark, and many others.

== See also ==
- List of best-selling music artists
