= 1950 in music =

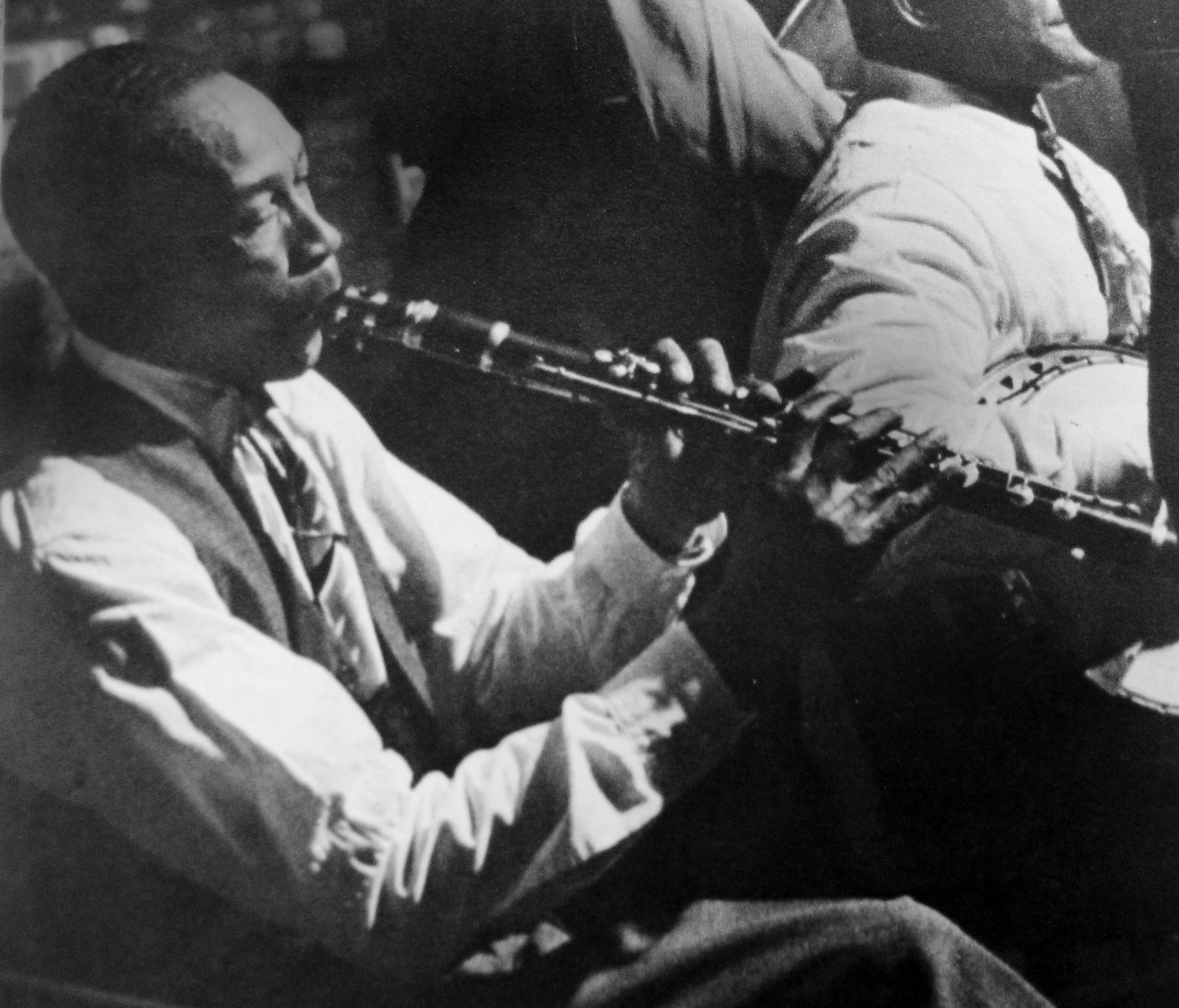
Clarinetist George Lewis in 1950 was prominent in the revived popularity of traditional jazz.

This is a list of notable events in music that took place in the year 1950.

== Specific locations ==
- 1950 in British music
- 1950 in Norwegian music

== Specific genres ==
- 1950 in country music
- 1950 in jazz

== Events ==
- January 3 – Sam Phillips launches Sun Records at 706 Union Avenue in Memphis, Tennessee.
- March 14 – Pablo Casals terminates his recording contract with RCA Records and signs with their chief competitor, Columbia Records.
- June 26 – Louis Armstrong records the first American version of C'est si bon with the English lyrics by Jerry Seelen.
- August 29 – The first American Music Competition of the Sigma Alpha Iota music fraternity is won by Richard Winslow for Huswifery, a choral composition for women's voices.
- August – Herbert Howells' Hymnus Paradisi is premiered at the Three Choirs Festival.
- September 24 – Alan Lomax sets sail from the United States for London and spends until 1959 recording in Europe for the Columbia World Library of Folk and Primitive Music.
- October 1 – Italian composer Luciano Berio marries American mezzo-soprano Cathy Berberian.
- October 11 – On temporary release from Ellis Island pending a deportation decision from U. S. immigration authorities, 20-year-old Friedrich Gulda makes his Carnegie Hall debut.
- November – The Eleanor Steber Award is won by soprano Willabelle Underwood.
- Johann Sebastian Bach is reburied in St. Thomas Church, Leipzig.
- Malcolm Sargent becomes chief conductor of the BBC Symphony Orchestra.
- Isaak Dunayevsky is named People's Artist of the USSR.
- Mitch Miller signs as A&R man with Columbia Records.
- Patti Page becomes the first (and only) artist to have a Number One record on the Pop, R&B and Country charts concurrently.
- Al Cernick is signed to Columbia by Mitch Miller, who changes the singer's name to Guy Mitchell.
- Columbia Records lures Jo Stafford away from Capitol.
- Georgia Gibbs leaves the Majestic label and scores her first charting single with Coral.
- Bandleader Les Baxter founds the school of "Outer Space" exotica.
- Sam Cooke replaces R. H. Harris as lead singer of The Soul Stirrers.

== Albums released ==
- American Folks Songs – Jo Stafford
- Auld Lang Syne – Bing Crosby
- Autumn in New York – Jo Stafford
- Barber Shop Ballads – The Mills Brothers
- Blue of the Night – Bing Crosby
- The Famous 1938 Carnegie Hall Jazz Concert – Benny Goodman
- Christmas Greetings – Bing Crosby
- Cole Porter Songs – Bing Crosby
- Country Feelin – Dinah Shore
- Dedicated to You – Frank Sinatra
- Drifting and Dreaming – Bing Crosby
- Dulce Patria – Jorge Negrete
- Ella Sings Gershwin – Ella Fitzgerald
- Frankie Laine – Frankie Laine
- Going My Way – Bing Crosby
- Historical America in Song – Burl Ives
- King Cole Trio – King Cole Trio
- King Cole Trio Volume 2 – King Cole Trio
- Live at Carnegie Hall – Benny Goodman
- Oh! Susanna – Al Jolson
- Patti Page – Patti Page
- Popular Classics for Four Pianos – Philharmonic Piano Quartet
- Porgy and Bess – Various Artists
- Sing a Song of Christmas – The Ames Brothers
- Sing and Dance with Frank Sinatra – Frank Sinatra
- Songs By Gershwin – Bing Crosby
- Songs of Faith – Jo Stafford
- Songs for Sunday Evening – Jo Stafford
- Tea for Two – Doris Day
- Two Loves Have I – Frankie Laine
- Voice of the Xtabay – Yma Sumac
- Young Man with a Horn – Doris Day

== No. 1 hit singles ==
These singles reached the top of Billboard magazine's charts in 1950.

First week	Number of weeks	Title	Artist
January 7, 1950	1	"Rudolph the Red-Nosed Reindeer"	Gene Autry, 7,000,000 sold by 1969
January 14, 1950	4	"I Can Dream, Can't I?"	The Andrews Sisters
February 11, 1950	1	"Rag Mop"	The Ames Brothers
February 18, 1950	4	"Chattanoogie Shoe Shine Boy"	Red Foley
March 18, 1950	4	"Music! Music! Music!"	Teresa Brewer
April 15, 1950	2	"If I Knew You Were Comin' I'd've Baked a Cake"	Eileen Barton
April 29, 1950	11	"The Third Man Theme"	Anton Karas, 4,000,000 sold
July 15, 1950	5	"Mona Lisa"	Nat King Cole
August 19, 1950	13	"Goodnight, Irene"	Gordon Jenkins & The Weavers, 2,000,000 sold
November 18, 1950	2	"Harbor Lights"	Sammy Kaye
December 2, 1950	4	"The Thing"	Phil Harris
December 30, 1950	9	"The Tennessee Waltz"	Patti Page

== Biggest hit singles ==
The following songs achieved the highest chart positions in the limited set of charts available for 1950.

#	Artist	Title	Year	Country	Chart entries
1	Nat King Cole	Mona Lisa	1950	US	US 1940s 1 – Jun 1950, US 1 for 5 weeks Jul 1950, Oscar in 1950, US BB 2 of 1950, POP 2 of 1950, DDD 4 of 1950, Italy 48 of 1951, RIAA 109, Acclaimed 1292
2	Patti Page	Tennessee Waltz	1950	US	US 1940s 1 – Nov 1950, US 1 for 9 weeks Dec 1950, US BB 4 of 1950, 6,000,000 sold by 1967
3	Phil Harris	The Thing	1950	US	US 1940s 1 – Nov 1950, US 1 for 4 weeks Dec 1950, Peel list 1 of 1950, US BB 12 of 1950, POP 12 of 1950
4	Red Foley	Chattanoogie Shoe Shine Boy	1950	US	US 1940s 1 – Jan 1950, US 1 for 4 weeks Feb 1950, DDD 17 of 1950, US BB 18 of 1950, POP 25 of 1950
5	Teresa Brewer	Music! Music! Music!	1950	US	US 1940s 1 – Feb 1950, US 1 for 4 weeks Mar 1950, US BB 3 of 1950, POP 3 of 1950

== Top hit records ==
- "A-Razz-A-Ma-Tazz" – Georgia Gibbs
- "All My Love (Bolero)" – Patti Page
- "Anema e core" – Tito Schipa
- "Are You Lonesome Tonight?" – Al Jolson
- "Ballin' the Jack", recorded by
  - Georgia Gibbs
  - Danny Kaye
- "Be My Love" – Mario Lanza
- "Bewitched" – Doris Day
- "Black Lace" – Frankie Laine
- "Boo-Hoo" – Guy Lombardo & The Lombardo Trio
- "A Bushel And A Peck" – Perry Como & Betty Hutton
- "Can Anyone Explain? (No, No, No!)" – The Ames Brothers
- "Chattanoogie Shoe Shine Boy" – Red Foley
- "Count Every Star", recorded by
  - Ray Anthony and His Orchestra
  - Dick Haymes and Artie Shaw
  - Hugo Winterhalter
- "Cry Of The Wild Goose" – Frankie Laine
- "Daddy's Little Girl" – The Mills Brothers
- "Dear, Dear, Dear" – Frankie Laine
- "Domino" – André Claveau
- "Dream a Little Dream of Me" – Frankie Laine
- "A Dreamer's Holiday" – Buddy Clark & The Girlfriends
- "El rancho 'e la Cambicha" – Antonio Tormo
- "Enjoy Yourself" – Guy Lombardo (Kenny Gardner & The Lombardo Trio vocals)
- "Goodnight, Irene" – The Weavers
- "Harbor Lights" – Sammy Kaye
- "Here Comes Santa Claus" – Andrews Sisters
- "Hymne à l'amour (Hymn To Love)" – Édith Piaf
- "I Can Dream, Can't I?" – The Andrews Sisters
- "I'll Never Be Free", recorded by:
  - Kay Starr and Tennessee Ernie Ford
  - Louis Jordan and Ella Fitzgerald
  - Annie Laurie and Paul Gayten and His Orchestra
  - Dinah Washington
- "I Love You For That" – Patti Page & Frankie Laine
- "I Wanna Be Loved" – The Andrews Sisters
- "If I Knew You Were Comin' I'd've Baked a Cake" – Eileen Barton
- "I'm Movin' On" – Hank Snow
- "It Isn't Fair" – Sammy Kaye (Don Cornell vocal)
- "Let's Go West Again" – Al Jolson
- "A Man Gets Awfully Lonesome" – Frankie Laine
- "Mona Lisa" – Nat King Cole
- "Music, Maestro, Please" – Frankie Laine
- "Music! Music! Music!" – Teresa Brewer
- "My Foolish Heart, recorded by
  - Billy Eckstine
  - Gordon Jenkins
- "My Heart Cries For You" – Guy Mitchell
- "Nevertheless" – The Mills Brothers
- "No Other Love" – Jo Stafford
- "The Old Piano Roll Blues" Al Jolson & The Andrews Sisters
- "Patricia" – Perry Como
- "Peter Cottontail" – Gene Autry
- "Play A Simple Melody" – Gary Crosby & Friend (Bing Crosby)
- "Rag Mop" – The Ames Brothers
- "Red Hot Mama" – Georgia Gibbs
- "The Roving Kind" – Guy Mitchell
- "Sentimental Me" – The Ames Brothers
- "Sleepy Ol' River" – Frankie Laine
- "Someday", recorded by
  - The Mills Brothers
  - Vaughn Monroe
- "Sometime" – The Mariners
- "Stars & Stripes Forever" – Frankie Laine
- "Swingin' In A Hammock" – Guy Lombardo (Don Rodney & The Lombardo Trio vocals)
- "The Tennessee Waltz" – Patti Page
- "There's No Tomorrow" – Tony Martin
- "The Thing" – Phil Harris
- "Thinking of You" – Don Cherry
- "The Third Man Theme" from the film The Third Man, recorded by
  - Anton Karas
  - Guy Lombardo
- "With My Eyes Wide Open I'm Dreaming" – Patti Page

== Top R&B hits on record ==
- "Double Crossing Blues" – Johnny Otis with Little Esther & The Robins

== Published popular music ==
- "Adelaide's Lament" words and music: Frank Loesser
- "African Bolero" m. John Serry Sr.
- "American Beauty Rose" w.m. Hal David, Redd Evans & Arthur Altman
- "Be My Love" w. Sammy Cahn m. Nicholas Brodszky
- "The Best Thing For You" w.m. Irving Berlin
- "Blind Date" w.m. Sid Robin
- "A Bushel And A Peck" w.m. Frank Loesser
- "Candy And Cake" w.m. Bob Merrill
- "Chattanoogie Shoe Shine Boy" w.m. Harry Stone & Jack Stapp
- "Choo'n Gum" w. Mann Curtis m. Vic Mizzy
- "Cold, Cold Heart" w.m. Hank Williams
- "The Cry of the Wild Goose" w.m. Terry Gilkyson
- "Dearie" w.m. Bob Hilliard & David Mann
- "Domino" w. (Eng) Don Raye (Fr) Jacques Plante m. Louis Ferrari
- "Freight Train" w. Paul James & Fred Williams m. trad arr. Elizabeth Cotton
- "The French Can-Can Polka" w. Jimmy Kennedy m. Jacques Offenbach
- "From This Moment On" w.m. Cole Porter
- "Frosty the Snowman" w.m. Steve Nelson & Jack Rollins
- "Fugue For Tinhorns" w.m. Frank Loesser
- "Get Out Those Old Records" w.m. Carmen Lombardo & John Jacob Loeb
- "Gone Fishin'" w.m. Nick Kenny & Charles Kenny
- "Guys and Dolls" w.m. Frank Loesser
- "Home Cookin"' w.m. Jay Livingston & Ray Evans
- "Hoop-Dee-Doo" w. Frank Loesser m. Milton De Lugg
- "The Hostess With The Mostes' On The Ball" w.m. Irving Berlin. Introduced by Ethel Merman in the musical Call Me Madam
- "I Almost Lost My Mind" w.m. Ivory Joe Hunter
- "I Didn't Slip, I Wasn't Pushed, I Fell" w.m. Edward Pola & George Wyle
- "I Don't Care If The Sun Don't Shine" w.m. Mack David
- "I Leave My Heart in an English Garden" w.m. Harry Parr-Davies and Christopher Hassall from the musical Dear Miss Phoebe
- "I Tawt I Taw a Puddy Tat" w.m. Alan Livingston, Billy May & Warren Foster
- "If I Knew You Were Comin' I'd've Baked A Cake" w.m. Al Hoffman, Bob Merrill & Clem Watts
- "If I Were A Bell" w.m. Frank Loesser
- "I'll Know" w.m. Frank Loesser
- "I'll Never Be Free" w.m. Bennie Benjamin & George David Weiss
- "I'm Movin' On" w.m. Hank Snow
- "It Is No Secret" w.m. Stuart Hamblen
- "It's A Lovely Day Today" w.m. Irving Berlin
- "I've Never Been In Love Before" w.m. Frank Loesser
- "Ivory Rag" Lou Busch, Jack Elliott
- "Little White Duck" w.m. Walt Barrows & Bernard Zaritsky
- "The Loveliest Night of the Year" w. Paul Francis Webster m. Juventino P. Rosas
- "Luck Be a Lady" w.m. Frank Loesser
- "Lucky Lucky Lucky Me" Berle, Arnold
- "Marry The Man Today" w.m. Frank Loesser
- "Marrying For Love" w.m. Irving Berlin
- "More I Cannot Wish You" w.m. Frank Loesser
- "My Heart Cries For You" w.m. Carl Sigman & Percy Faith
- "My Time Of Day" w.m. Frank Loesser
- "No Other Love" adaptation from Chopin's Étude No. 3 in E major, Op. 10. w.m. Bob Russell & Paul Weston
- "The Old Piano Roll Blues" w.m. Cy Coben
- "The Oldest Established" w.m. Frank Loesser
- "Orange Colored Sky" w.m. Milton De Lugg & William Stein
- "Patricia" w.m. Benny Davis
- "(Remember Me) I'm the One Who Loves You" w.m. Stuart Hamblen
- "The Roving Kind" adapt. w.m. Jessie Cavanaugh & Arnold Stanton
- "Sam's Song" w. Jack Elliott m. Lew Quadling
- "Shot Gun Boogie" w.m. Tennessee Ernie Ford
- "Silver Bells" w.m. Jay Livingston & Ray Evans. Introduced by Bob Hope in the 1951 Musical film The Lemon Drop Kid.
- "Sit Down, You're Rockin' The Boat" w.m. Frank Loesser. Introduced by Stubby Kaye in the musical Guys and Dolls.
- "Sixty Minute Man" w.m. Billy Ward & Rose Marks
- "Sleigh Ride" w. Mitchell Parish m. Leroy Anderson
- "Sue Me" w.m. Frank Loesser
- "The Syncopated Clock" w. Mitchell Parish m. Leroy Anderson
- "Take Back Your Mink" w.m. Frank Loesser. Introduced by Vivian Blaine in the musical Guys and Dolls.
- "The Thing" w.m. Charles R. Grean
- "Tzena, Tzena, Tzena" adapt. trad Hebrew w. (Eng) Mitchell Parish m. Issachar Miron & Julius Grossman
- "You Don't Have to Be a Baby to Cry" w.m. Bob Merrill & Terry Shand
- "You're Just In Love" w.m. Irving Berlin

== Classical music ==
=== Premieres ===
Composer	Composition	Date	Location	Performers
Andriessen, Hendrik	Organ Concerto	1950-11-01	Amsterdam	Concertgebouw Orchestra – Monteux
Boulez, Pierre	Le Soleil des eaux (2nd version, subsequently withdrawn)	1950-07-18	Paris	Joachim, Mollet, Peyron / RTF National Orchestra – Désormière
Boulez, Pierre	Piano Sonata No. 2 (1948)	1950-04-29	Paris	Grimaud
Benjamin Britten	Five Flower Songs	1950-07-23	Darlington Hall, England	Imogen Holst conducting a student choir
Cage, John	String Quartet in Four Parts	1950-08-12	Black Mountain, North Carolina	Summer Session Quartet
Foss, Lukas	Song of Anguish	1950-03-10	Boston	Boston Symphony – Foss
Guridi, Jesús	String Quartet No. 2	1950-05-14	Madrid	National Chamber Music Association
Hartmann, Karl Amadeus	Adagio (Symphony No. 2)	1950-09-10	Donaueschingen Festival, Germany	SWF Symphony – Rosbaud
Howells, Herbert	Hymnus Paradisi (1938)	1950-09-07	Gloucester, UK (Three Choirs Festival)	Baillie, William Herbert / London Symphony – Howells
Jolivet, André	Concerto for Flute and Strings	1950-01-24	Paris	Rampla / [unknown orchestra and conductor]
Khachaturian, Aram	Triumphal Poem	1950-12-09	Moscow	USSR Radio Symphony – Gauk
Martinu, Bohuslav	Intermezzo for Large Orchestra	1950-12-29	New York City	Louisville Orchestra – Whitney
Martinu, Bohuslav	Piano Trio No. 2	1950-05-19	Cambridge, Massachusetts	Liepmann, Finckel, Tucker
Martinu, Bohuslav	Sinfonietta La Jolla	1950-08-13	San Diego, California	Orchestra of the Musical Arts Society of La Jolla – Sokoloff
Nono, Luigi	Variazioni canoniche sulla serie dell'op. 41 di Schoenberg	1950-08-27	Darmstädter Ferienkurse, Germany	Darmstadt Landestheater Orchestra – Scherchen
Prokofiev, Sergei	Cello Sonata (1949)	1950-03-01	Moscow	Rostropovich, Richter
Searle, Humphrey	Poem for 22 Strings	1950-08-27	Darmstädter Ferienkurse, Germany	Darmstadt Landestheater Orchestra – Scherchen
Strauss, Richard (d. 1949)	Four Last Songs (1948)	1950-05-22	Royal Albert Hall, London	Flagstad / Philharmonia Orchestra – Furtwängler
Villa-Lobos, Heitor	Montanhas de Brasil (Symphony No. 6) (1944)	1950-04-29	Rio de Janeiro	Rio de Janeiro Municipal Theatre Symphony – Villa-Lobos
Villa-Lobos, Heitor	Piano Concerto No. 2 (1948)	1950-04-21	Rio de Janeiro	João de Souza Lima / Rio de Janeiro Municipal Theatre Symphony – Villa-Lobos

=== Compositions ===
- Hendrik Andriessen – Concerto for Organ and Orchestra
- Malcolm Arnold – English Dances for orchestra, Op. 27
- Alexander Arutiunian – Concerto for Trumpet and Orchestra
- Arno Babajanian – Heroic Ballade
- Ernest Bloch – Suite hébraïque
- Karl-Birger Blomdahl – Symphony No. 3 Facetter
- Pierre Boulez –
  - Polyphonie X
  - Le soleil des eaux, for soprano, chorus and orchestra (second version)
- John Cage – String Quartet in Four Parts
- Carlos Chávez – Concerto for Violin and Orchestra
- Jani Christou – First Symphony
- Arnold Cooke – Trio for Violin, Viola and Cello
- George Crumb – A Cycle of Greek Lyrics for voice and piano
- Henri Dutilleux – Blackbird for piano
- Jesús Guridi – String Quartet in A minor
- Eivind Groven – Hjalarljod Overture, Op. 38
- Karl Amadeus Hartmann – Symphony No. 5 Symphonie Concertante
- Hans Henkemans – Concerto for Violin and Orchestra
- Vagn Holmboe – Symphony No. 7
- Wojciech Kilar – Toccata for piano
- Ernst Krenek – Suite for String Trio Parvula Corona Musicalis
- Bohuslav Martinů –
  - Concerto No. 2 for two violins and orchestra
  - Duo No. 2, for Violin and Viola
  - Intermezzo for Large Orchestra
  - Sinfonietta La Jolla, in A major, for piano and chamber orchestra
  - Trio No. 2, for violin, cello, and piano, in D minor
- Luigi Nono – Variazioni canoniche sulla serie dell’op.41 di A. Schönberg, for chamber orchestra
- Vincent Persichetti – Divertimento for Band
- Allan Pettersson – First Concerto for Strings
- Walter Piston – Symphony No.4
- Theodor Rogalski – Three Romanian Dances for orchestra
- Arnold Schoenberg –
  - Psalm 130 "De profundis", Op. 50b
  - Modern Psalm, Op. 50c (unfinished)
  - Style and Idea (collection of essays and other works, translated by Dika Newlin)
- Humphrey Searle – Poem for 22 Strings
- John Serry Sr. –
  - Eight Accordion Quartet Arrangements
  - La Culebra, for flute & accordion
  - African Bolero, for flute & accordion
- Karlheinz Stockhausen –
  - Choral ("Wer uns trug mit Schmerzen in dies Leben"), for a cappella choir, Nr. 1/9 (1950)
  - Chöre für Doris, for a cappella choir, Nr. ^{1}/_{11} (1950)
  - Drei Lieder, for alto voice and chamber orchestra, Nr. 1/10 (1950)
- Heitor Villa-Lobos –
  - String Quartet No. 12
  - Symphony No. 8

== Opera ==
- Luigi Dallapiccola – Job
- Norman Dello Joio – The Triumph of Saint Joan
- Lukas Foss – The Jumping Frog of Calaveras County (opera in two scenes, libretto by Jean Karsavina, premiered on May 18, 1950, at Indiana University)
- Vittorio Giannini – The Taming of the Shrew
- Gian Carlo Menotti – The Consul

== Film ==
- Georges Auric - Orpheus
- Aram Khachaturian – Secret Mission (1950 film)
- Leith Stevens - Destination Moon
- Franz Waxman – Sunset Boulevard (film)

== Musical theatre ==
- Alive and Kicking – Broadway revue opened at the Winter Garden Theatre on January 17 and ran for 46 performances
- Call Me Madam (Music and Lyrics: Irving Berlin Book: Howard Lindsay and Russel Crouse.) Broadway production opened at the Imperial Theatre on October 12 and ran for 644 performances.
- Carousel (Music: Richard Rodgers Lyrics and Book: Oscar Hammerstein II.) London production opened at the Drury Lane Theatre on June 7 and ran for 566 performances.
- Dear Miss Phoebe London production opened at the Phoenix Theatre on October 13 and ran for 283 performances
- Guys and Dolls (Music and Lyrics: Frank Loesser Book: Abe Burrows & Jo Swerling). Broadway production opened at the 46th Street Theatre on November 24 and ran for 1200 performances.
- The Highwayman Music, Lyrics & Book: Edmond Samuels. Australian production opened at the Kings Theatre, Melbourne on November 18
- Michael Todd's Peep Show Broadway revue opened at Winter Garden Theatre on June 28 and ran for 278 performances.
- Out Of This World (Music and Lyrics: Cole Porter Book: Dwight Taylor and Reginald Lawrence) Broadway production opened at the New Century Theatre on December 21 and ran for 157 performances.
- Peter Pan Lyrics and Music: Leonard Bernstein. Broadway production opened at the Imperial Theatre on April 24 and ran for 321 performances
- Tickets, Please! Broadway revue opened at the Coronet Theatre on April 27 and ran for 245 performances.

== Musical films ==
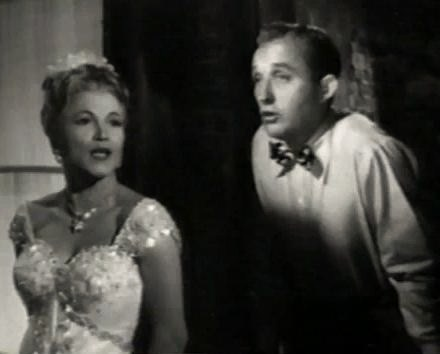
Dorothy Kirsten and Bing Crosby in "Mr. Music".

- Annie Get Your Gun (music and lyrics by Irving Berlin), starring Betty Hutton, Howard Keel, Louis Calhern and Keenan Wynn.
- Bhai Bahen, starring Geeta Bali and Bharat Bhushan.
- Canzoni per le strade, starring Luciano Taioli and Antonella Lualdi
- Cinderella, animated film featuring the voice of Ilene Woods and Verna Felton.
- Come Dance with Me featuring Anne Shelton and Anton Karas
- Cossacks of the Kuban (Kubanskie kazaki), starring Vladlen Davydov and Marina Ladynina
- Fancy Pants starring Bob Hope and Lucille Ball
- Hamara Ghar, starring Meena Kumari and Durga Khote
- I'll Get By starring June Haver, Gloria DeHaven and Dennis Day, and featuring Harry James.
- Mr. Music starring Bing Crosby and featuring Peggy Lee, Groucho Marx and Dorothy Kirsten.
- Mussorgsky, starring Aleksandr Borisov
- My Blue Heaven, starring Betty Grable and Dan Dailey
- Pagan Love Song starring Esther Williams and Howard Keel
- Samsaram, starring N. T. Rama Rao, Akkineni Nageswara Rao and Lakshmirajyam
- Singing Guns released February 28 starring Vaughn Monroe, Ella Raines, Walter Brennan and Ward Bond
- Tea For Two starring Doris Day and Gordon MacRae
- There's a Girl in My Heart starring Lee Bowman, Elyse Knox, Gloria Jean and Peggy Ryan
- Three Little Words starring Fred Astaire, Red Skelton and Vera Ellen, and featuring Helen Kane dubbing for Debbie Reynolds.
- The Chocolate Girl (La petite chocolatière), starring Giselle Pascal, Claude Dauphin and Henri Genès
- The Daughter of Rosie O'Grady, starring June Haver and Gordon MacRae
- The Toast of New Orleans starring Kathryn Grayson and Mario Lanza
- Two Weeks With Love starring Jane Powell, Ricardo Montalbán, Louis Calhern, Debbie Reynolds and Carleton Carpenter.
- The West Point Story starring James Cagney, Virginia Mayo, Doris Day and Gordon MacRae

== Births ==
=== January – February ===
- January 1
  - Morgan Fisher (Mott the Hoople)
  - Steve Ripley (The Tractors)
- January 3 – Beth Anderson, American composer
- January 5 – Chris Stein, guitarist and co-founder of Blondie
- January 7 – Juan Gabriel, singer (died 2016)
- January 9 – David Johansen, proto-punk singer (New York Dolls) (died 2025)
- January 21 – Billy Ocean, singer
- January 23
  - Bill Cunningham, American bass and keyboard player
  - Luis Alberto Spinetta, "father of Argentine rock" (died 2012)
  - Danny Federici (E Street Band)
- January 26 – Paul Pena, singer, songwriter and guitarist (died 2005)
- January 28 – Bob Hay, American singer-songwriter
- January 29 – Max Carl, American singer-songwriter, guitarist and keyboard player (Grand Funk Railroad)
- February 1 – Mike Campbell, American guitarist, songwriter and producer (Tom Petty and the Heartbreakers and Mudcrutch)
- February 2 – Ross Valory, American rock bass player (Journey and The Storm)
- February 3 – John Schlitt, American Christian rock singer (Petra and Head East)
- February 6 – Natalie Cole, African American singer, daughter of Nat King Cole (died 2015)
- February 12 – Steve Hackett, guitarist and composer (Genesis)
- February 13 – Peter Gabriel, singer and composer (Genesis)
- February 14 – Roger Fisher, American guitarist (Heart and Alias)
- February 15 – David Brown, bass guitarist (Santana) (died 2000)
- February 16 – Roman Tam, Chinese Cantopop singer (died 2002)
- February 19 – Andy Powell, rock guitarist (Wishbone Ash)
- February 20 – Walter Becker, jazz rock bass guitarist, songwriter and record producer (Steely Dan) (died 2017)
- February 24 – Pappo, Argentinian rock musician (died 2005)
- February 26
  - Jonathan Cain, rock musician (Journey)
  - Billy Steinberg, American songwriter (Madonna, The Veronicas, Cyndi Lauper)

=== March – April ===
- March 2 – Karen Carpenter, singer (died 1983)
- March 11 – Katia Labèque, pianist
- March 20 – Carl Palmer, drummer (Emerson, Lake & Palmer, Asia)
- March 21
  - Roger Hodgson (Supertramp)
  - Cho Yong-pil, South Korean singer and songwriter
- March 22 – David Golub, pianist and conductor (died 2000)
- March 26 – Teddy Pendergrass, singer (died 2010)
- March 27
  - Tony Banks, rock keyboardist (Genesis)
  - Maria Ewing, operatic soprano (died 2022)
- March 28 – Claudio Lolli, Italian novelist, singer and songwriter (died 2018)
- April 5 – Agnetha Fältskog, singer (ABBA)
- April 12
  - David Cassidy, singer (died 2017)
  - Ivar Frounberg, Danish composer and organist
- April 22 – Peter Frampton, singer
- April 24 – Rob Hyman (The Hooters)
- April 25 – Steve Ferrone (Average White Band)
- April 28 – Willie Colón, American salsa musician and social activist (died 2026)

=== May – June ===
- May 2 – Lou Gramm (Foreigner)
- May 3 – Mary Hopkin, singer
- May 4 – Darryl Hunt (The Pogues) (died 2022)
- May 7 – Prairie Prince, American rock drummer and graphic artist
- May 9 – Tom Petersson (Cheap Trick)
- May 12 – Billy Squier, singer-songwriter and guitarist
- May 13
  - Stevie Wonder, singer-songwriter and multi-instrumentalist
  - Danny Kirwan, guitarist (Fleetwood Mac) (died 2018)
- May 16 – Ray Condo, singer, saxophonist, and guitarist (died 2004)
- May 18 – Mark Mothersbaugh (Devo)
- May 20 – Victor Lewis, American jazz drummer, composer, and educator
- May 22 – Bernie Taupin, lyricist
- May 29 – Rebbie Jackson, singer
- May 24 – Terry Scott Taylor, record producer
- June 1 – Graham Russell (Air Supply)
- June 3 – Suzi Quatro, rock singer
- June 5
  - Ronnie Dyson, singer and actor (died 1990)
  - Michael Monarch (Steppenwolf)
- June 19 – Ann Wilson (Heart)
- June 21 – Joey Kramer (Aerosmith)

=== July – August ===
- July 4 – Tonio K, American singer-songwriter
- July 5
  - Huey Lewis, singer and songwriter
  - Michael Monarch, American guitarist, songwriter, and producer (Steppenwolf, Detective, and World Classic Rockers)
- July 10 – Greg Kihn, rock musician, radio personality and novelist.
- July 12 – Eric Carr (Kiss) (died 1991)
- July 14 – Gwen Guthrie, singer-songwriter (died 1999)
- July 18 – Glenn Hughes (Village People) (died 2001)
- July 19 – Freddy Moore, singer-songwriter
- July 23 – Blair Thornton (Bachman–Turner Overdrive)
- August 12 – Kid Creole, American singer
- August 13 – Pluto Shervington, Jamaican reggae singer (died 2024)
- August 18 – Dennis Elliott, British rock drummer (Foreigner)
- August 25 – Willy DeVille, American singer and songwriter (died 2009)

=== September – October ===
- September 10 – Joe Perry, guitarist (Aerosmith)
- September 14 – Paul Kossoff, guitarist (Free) (died 1976)
- September 17 – Fee Waybill rock singer-songwriter (The Tubes)
- September 27 – Linda Lewis, singer (died 2023)
- September 29 – Andrew Dalton, countertenor
- October 1 – Elpida, singer
- October 2 – Mike Rutherford, musician and songwriter (Genesis)
- October 8 – Robert Kool Bell, singer (Kool and The Gang)
- October 12 – Lowell Lo, Hong Kong singer-songwriter, actor and film composer
- October 20 – Tom Petty, rock singer-songwriter and guitarist (died 2017)
- October 24 - May Pang, American former music executive. She worked for John Lennon and Yoko Ono as a personal assistant and production coordinator.

=== November – December ===
- November 1 – Dan Peek (America) (died 2011)
- November 11 – Jim Peterik (Ides of March, Survivor)
- November 12 – Barbara Fairchild, American singer-songwriter
- November 18
  - Graham Parker, British singer-songwriter
  - Rudy Sarzo, Cuban-American bass player (Quiet Riot, Whitesnake, Dio, Blue Öyster Cult, Manic Eden, and Queensrÿche)
- November 20 – Gary Green (Gentle Giant)
- November 21
  - Marie Bergman, Eurovision singer
  - Livingston Taylor, singer-songwriter
- November 22
  - Tina Weymouth, American musician, singer-songwriter, bassist (Talking Heads, Tom Tom Club)
  - Steven Van Zandt (aka "Little Steven", "Miami Steve") (E Street Band)
- December 1 – Richard Keith [birth name Keith Thibodeaux], American drummer and actor
- December 5 – Camarón de la Isla, flamenco singer
- December 6 – Joe Hisaishi, Japanese composer and director
- December 8 – Dan Hartman, singer-songwriter (died 1994)
- December 9 – Joan Armatrading, singer-songwriter
- December 20 – Arturo Márquez, composer
- December 25 – Rockdrigo González, folk & rock singer-songwriter (died in earthquake 1985)
- December 28 – Alex Chilton (Box Tops, Big Star) (died 2010)

== Deaths ==
- January 1 – Kate Carney, English singer and comedian (born 1869)
- January 2 – Theophrastos Sakellaridis, Greek composer and conductor (born 1883)
- January 13 – Dimitrios Semsis, Greek violinist (born 1883)
- January 28 – Kansas Joe McCoy, American blues musician and songwriter (born 1905)
- February 10 – Armen Tigranian, Armenian composer (born 1879)
- February 26 – Sir Harry Lauder, Scottish singer, comedian and songwriter (born 1870)
- February 28 – Ernst Abert Couturier, cornet virtuoso, composer, inventor and instrument manufacturer (born 1869)
- March 2 – Milton Schwarzwald, film director and composer (born 1891)
- March 8 – Jaroslav Kocián, violinist, composer and teacher (born 1883)
- April 2 – Adolf Wiklund, Swedish composer (born 1879)
- April 3 – Kurt Weill, composer in many styles (born 1900)
- April 8 – Vaslav Nijinsky, ballet dancer (born 1889/90)
- April 11 – Noël Eadie, Scottish soprano (born 1901)
- April 23 – Gemma Bellincioni, operatic soprano (born 1864)
- April 27 — Karl Straube, German organist (born 1873)
- May 7 – Bertha "Chippie" Hill, blues singer and vaudeville performer (born 1905)
- May 13 – Pauline de Ahna, operatic soprano (born 1863)
- May 27 – Auguste Aramini, French singer (born 1875)
- June 9 – Joe Burke, pianist and composer (born 1884)
- June 26 – Antonina Nezhdanova, coloratura soprano (born 1873)
- July 1 – Émile Jaques-Dalcroze, developer of eurhythmics (born 1865)
- July 7 – Fats Navarro, jazz musician (born 1923)
- July 11 – Buddy DeSylva, songwriter (born 1895)
- July 26 – Papa Charlie McCoy, blues musician (born 1909)
- July 30 – Guilhermina Suggia, cellist (born 1885)
- August 3 – Georg Høeberg, composer and conductor (born 1872)
- August 8 – Nikolai Myaskovsky, Soviet composer and teacher of Polish birth (born 1881)
- August 26 – Giuseppe De Luca, operatic baritone (born 1876)
- September 5 – Al Killian, trumpeter and bandleader (born 1916)
- September 20 – Georges Mager, trumpet player (born 1885)
- October 11 – Emil Votoček, chemist, composer and music theorist (born 1862)
- October 15 – Clément Doucet, pianist (born 1895)
- October 23 – Al Jolson, singer and actor (born 1886)
- October 26 – Evelyn Suart, English pianist (born 1881)
- November 20 – Francesco Cilea, opera composer (born 1866)
- November 23 – Percival Mackey, English pianist, composer and bandleader (born 1894)
- December 2 – Dinu Lipatti, Romanian pianist and composer (born 1917; Hodgkin's disease)
- December 9 – Georg Hann, operatic bass-baritone (born 1897)
- December 22 – Julius Weismann, German composer and conductor (born 1879)
- December 26 – Ben Black, songwriter and impresario (born 1889)
- December 28 – Charles L. Johnson, composer of ragtime and popular music (born 1876)
- December 31 – Charles Koechlin, composer and teacher (born 1867)
- date unknown
  - Jaime de Angulo, ethnomusicologist (born 1887)
  - Edouard Espinosa, dancer, choreographer and teacher (born 1871)
  - Cenobio Hernandez, composer (born 1863)
  - Ray Perry, jazz musician (born 1915)
