= Billboard year-end top 30 singles of 1950 =

Ranking of recorded music

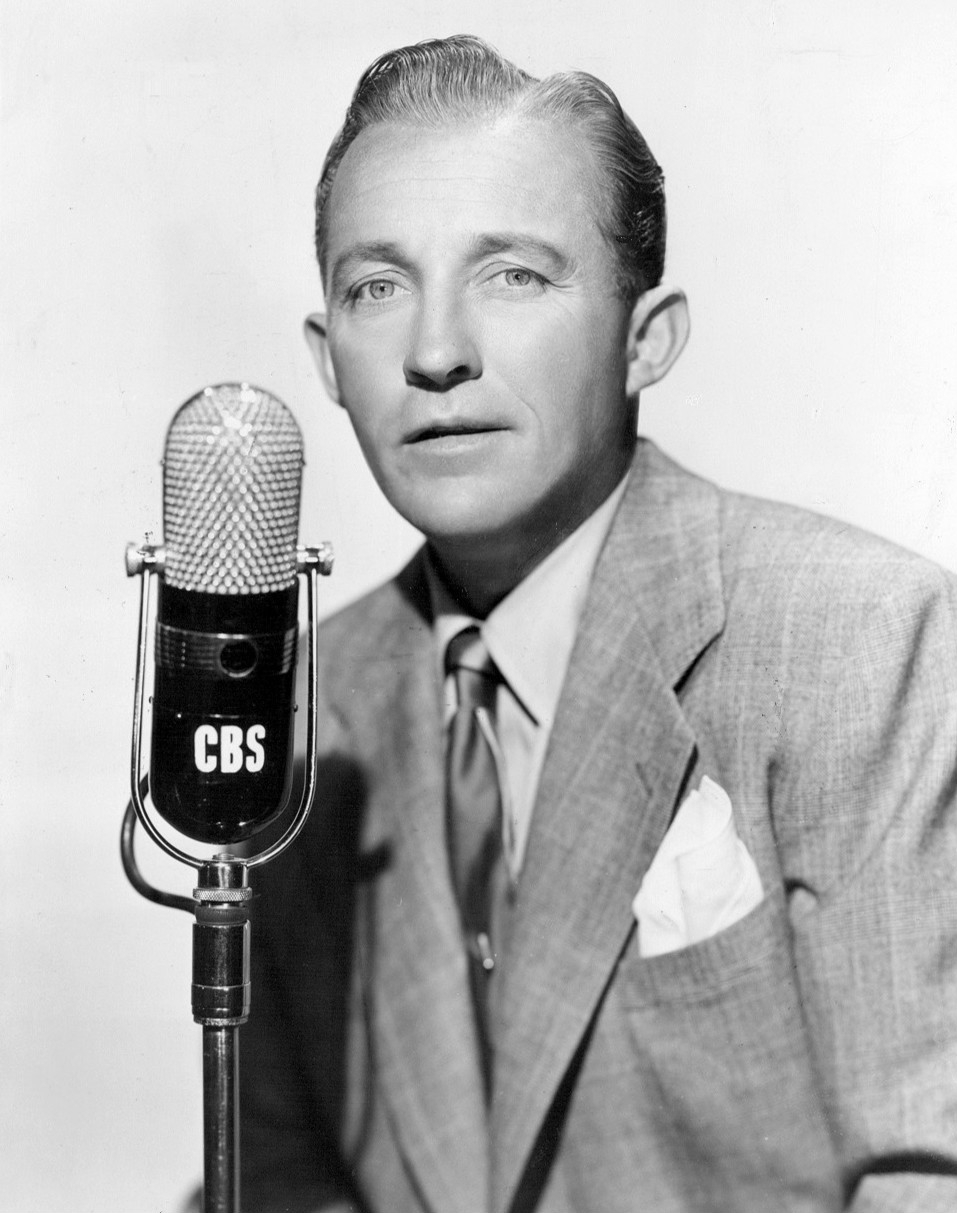
Bing Crosby had three songs on the year-end top 30.

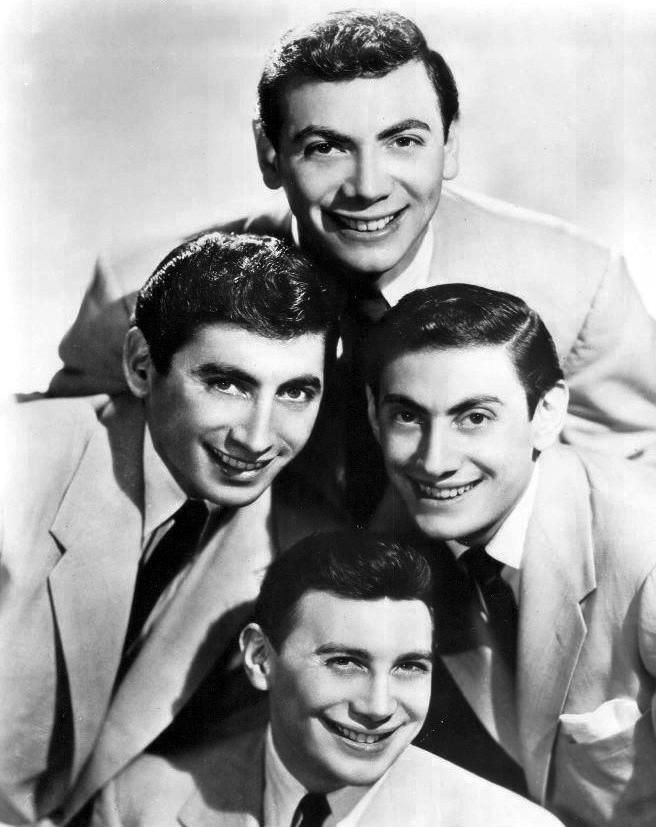
The Ames Brothers had three songs on the year-end top 30.

This is a list of Billboard magazine's top popular songs of 1950 according to retail sales.

No.	Title	Artist(s)
1	"Goodnight Irene"	Gordon Jenkins & The Weavers
2	"Mona Lisa"	Nat King Cole
3	"Third Man Theme"	Anton Karas
4	"Sam's Song"	Gary & Bing Crosby with Matty Matlock
5	"Play a Simple Melody"	Gary & Bing Crosby with Matty Matlock
6	"Music, Music, Music"	Teresa Brewer
7	"Third Man Theme"	Guy Lombardo
8	"Chattanoogie Shoe Shine Boy"	Red Foley
9	"Harbor Lights"	Sammy Kaye
10	"It Isn't Fair"	Sammy Kaye & Don Cornell
11	"If I Knew You Were Coming I'd have Baked a Cake"	Eileen Barton with Morty Craft
12	"Bonaparte's Retreat"	Kay Starr with Lou Busch
13	"Tzena, Tzena, Tzena"	Gordon Jenkins & The Weavers
14	"There's No Tomorrow"	Tony Martin with Henri René
15	"The Thing"	Phil Harris with Walter Scharf
16	"Sentimental Me"	Ames Brothers
17	"I Wanna Be Loved"	Andrews Sisters & Gordon Jenkins
18	"Tennessee Waltz"	Patti Page
19	"I Can Dream, Can't I"	Andrews Sisters & Gordon Jenkins
20	"I'll Never Be Free"	Kay Starr & Tennessee Ernie Ford
21	"All My Love"	Patti Page
22	"My Foolish Heart"	Gordon Jenkins
23	"Rag Mop"	Ames Brothers
24	"Bewitched"	Bill Snyder
25	"Hoop-Dee-Doo"	Perry Como & The Fontane Sisters with Mitchell Ayres
26	"Bewitched"	Gordon Jenkins
27	"Can Anyone Explain?"	Ames Brothers
28	"My Foolish Heart"	Billy Eckstine
29	"Dear Hearts and Gentle People"	Bing Crosby with Judd Conlon and Perry Botkin
30	"The Cry of the Wild Goose"	Frankie Laine with Carl T. Fischer

== See also ==
- 1950 in music
- List of Billboard number-one singles of 1950
