= Victor Smalley =

American writer (1877–1910)

Victor Herbert Smalley (1877 – December 20, 1910) was a writer, reporter and promoter who worked at newspapers, songwriting, and playwriting in the United States. In 1907 he wrote "That Lovin' Rag" with music by Bernie Adler. Victor Records recorded The Peerless Quartet performing their song "That Fussy Rag" in 1910. Lou Busch recorded the song "Dat Lovin' Rag" he wrote with Adler on the 1950 album Honky-Tonk Piano, re-titled as "That Everlovin' Rag" and rearranged. It was also recorded by Dick Hyman in 1958 his a honky-tonk album as "Knuckles O'Toole". It and "That Fussy Rag" continue to be performed in the 21st century at various ragtime events.

In 1902 he was editor and publisher of Northwest magazine. It was repurposed as Northwestern Farmer and published along with Smalley's Magazine by Smalley and Stephen Conday. Both were declared bankrupt in 1904. In 1904 he ran an ad for workers for a publication. In 1903 his photograph accompanied a solicitation to invest in a mining railway.

Smalley was born in New York in 1877. He married and had three children. His peripatetic life took him from St. Paul to Los Angeles, New York, Seattle, and New Orleans for work.

Smalley died in New Orleans at the age of 32 of appendicitis.

== Discography ==
- "That Lovin' Rag" (1907)
- "Love, Love, Love" (1908)
- "The Fussy Rag", recorded on Victor Records in 1910 performed by the Peerless Quartet
- "Won't You Come Up and Spoon in Coey's Balloon. "Chicago" Waltz Song" (1908), lyrics, composed by Bernie Adler
- "Good-Morning Judge" (1908), music by Adler
- "The Navy" (1908)
- "Oh! Oh! Oh!" (1910), co-written with Anthony Maggio

== Plays ==
- A Mexican Tangle, (1908) with Bernie Adler
- The Boss Bossing (1915)

== Writings ==
- "The Great Northwest"
- "The New Irrigation Law and What itMeans for the West"
