= John Elliot (songwriter) =

Prolific American songwriter

John Elliot (also known as Jack Elliot, John M. Elliot, John M. Elliott and Jack Elliott) (7 May 1914 – 3 January 1972) was an American songwriter, credited with having written more than 600 songs for motion pictures.

== Biography ==
Elliot was born in Gowanda, New York, on 7 May 1914. He was educated at Bennett High School in Buffalo, New York and then worked as an entertainer in vaudeville, nightclubs, and on radio. In 1939, he also worked as a theatre reporter for the Chicago edition of Variety magazine. He began to write songs in 1940, moved to Hollywood in 1943, and became a member of ASCAP in 1945. Jack subsequently composed songs for over 40 Western movies at Republic Studios alone, most notably for Roy Rogers and Dale Evans films.

He was the lyricist for several songs by Harold Spina, including "It's So Nice To Have A Man Around The House" (made famous by Dinah Shore). With Lew Quadling, he wrote "Sam's Song", which was a hit recording in 1950 for both Bing Crosby (Decca 27112) and Joe "Fingers" Carr (Capitol 962). Elliot also wrote songs with Sonny Burke for Walt Disney's Toot, Whistle, Plunk and Boom which won the 1953 Oscar for Best Short Animated Feature.

By 1955, Time magazine was describing him as an "ex-songwriter and Hollywood producer of TV commercials" and as the manager of French-born nightclub singer, Vicki Benet. At the time, Elliot and Benet were developing a television series called Rendezvous with Vicki, which was to be hosted by a "genuine British lord" who would also do the commercials. In 1964, Elliot and Benet married in Sydney where Elliot was working on a television series with Australian producer and promoter Jack Neary.

Elliot died of a heart attack in Los Angeles, California, on 3 January 1972 at the age of 57. He had married Judy Rotman in 1940: they had a son John Michael.

== Sources ==
- American Film Institute, The American Film Institute catalog of motion pictures produced in the United States, Volume 1, Part 1, University of California Press, 1971. ISBN 0-520-21521-4
- Cotter, Bill, The Wonderful World of Disney Television: A Complete History, Hyperion, 1997. ISBN 0-7868-6359-5
- Jasen, David A., A century of American popular music: 2000 best-loved and remembered songs (1899–1999), Taylor & Francis, 2002. ISBN 0-415-93700-0
- Lonergan, David F., Hit records, 1950-1975, Scarecrow Press, 2005. ISBN 0-8108-5129-6
- McNamara, Daniel I. (ed.). "Elliott, John M. (Jack)", The ASCAP Biographical Dictionary Of Composers, Authors, and Publishers Second Edition, Thomas Y. Crowell Company, 1952, p. 143
- New York Times, "John M. Elliott, 57, Wrote 'Sam's Song'", 6 January 1972, p, 40
- The Hour (via UPI), "Obituaries", 5 January 1972, p. 6
- The Sun-Herald, "Stars Wed in Secret", 6 September 1964, p. 27
- Time Magazine, "Radio: The Blonde & the Peers", Vol. LXVI, No. 5, 1 August 1955, p. 38
- Young, William H. and Young, Nancy K., Music of the World War II Era, Greenwood Publishing Group, 2008. ISBN 0-313-33891-4
