= Cadenza =

Improvised solo between musical sections

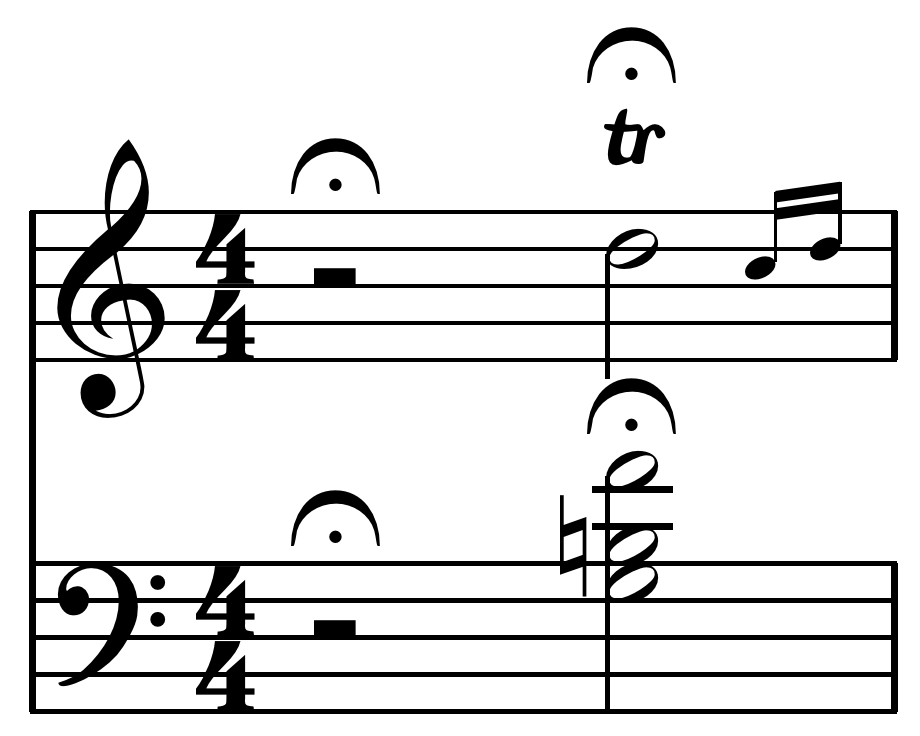
Cadenza indication from Beethoven's Piano Concerto No. 3: fermata over rest indicates beginning, fermata over the trill indicates close.

In music, a cadenza (from Italian: cadenza [kaˈdɛntsa], meaning cadence; plural, cadenze [kaˈdɛntse]) is, generically, an improvised or written-out ornamental passage played or sung by a soloist(s), usually in a "free" rhythmic style, and often allowing virtuosic display. During this time, the accompaniment will rest or sustain a note or chord. Thus, an improvised cadenza is indicated in written notation by a fermata in all parts. A cadenza will usually occur over either the final or penultimate note in a piece, the lead-in (German: Eingang), or the final or penultimate note in an important subsection of a piece. A cadenza can also be found before a final coda or ritornello.

== Origin ==
Initially, cadenzas were more simple and structured—a performer would add small embellishments such as trills to the end of cadences. These small embellishments of the early cadenza did not affect meter. However, as the improvised embellishments continued, they became longer and more thought out. This made way for the 'composed' cadenza which ultimately progressed into the 'free' metered feel that is more commonly associated with cadenzas today. Performers are able to play without being tied to meter or a strict time, and accompanists in orchestra await their entrance.

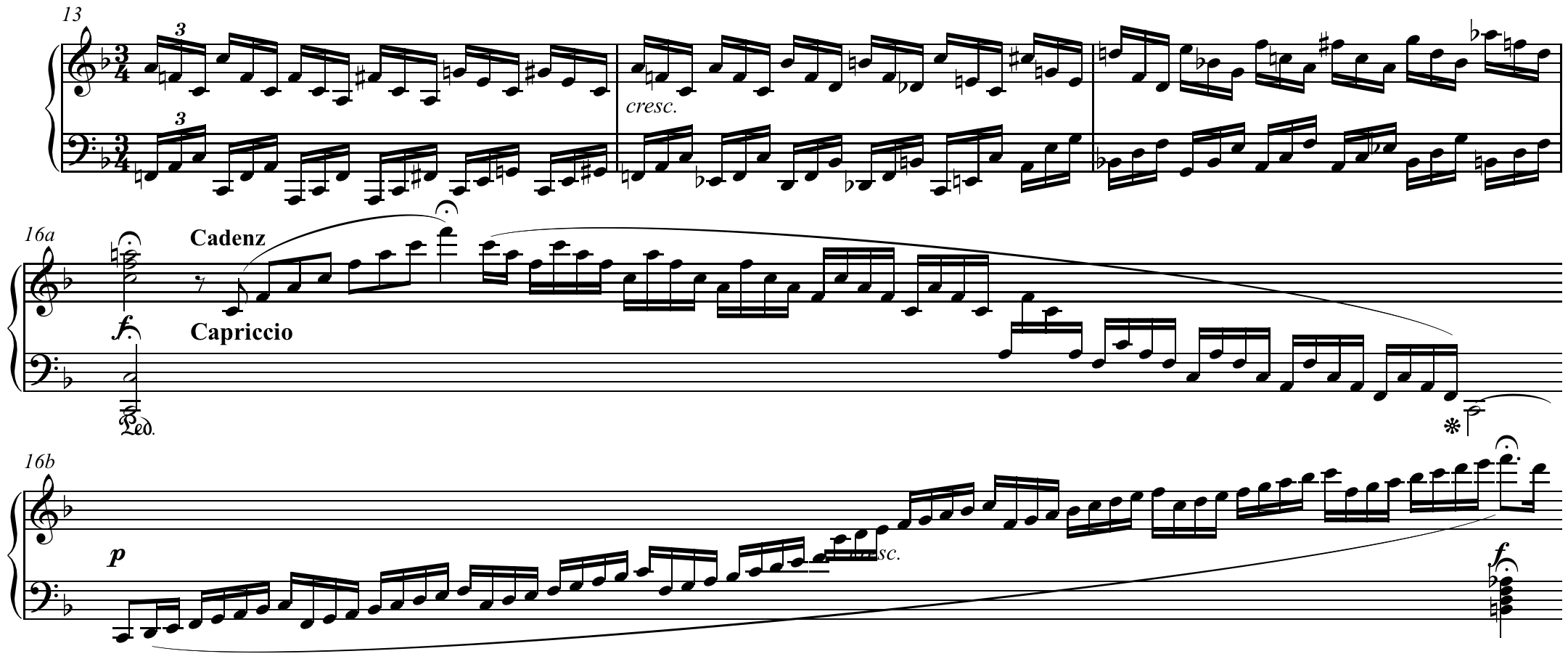
Written-out cadenza from Mozart's K. 398 (end of variation 6) demonstrates the often unmetered quality of cadenzas.

== In concerti ==
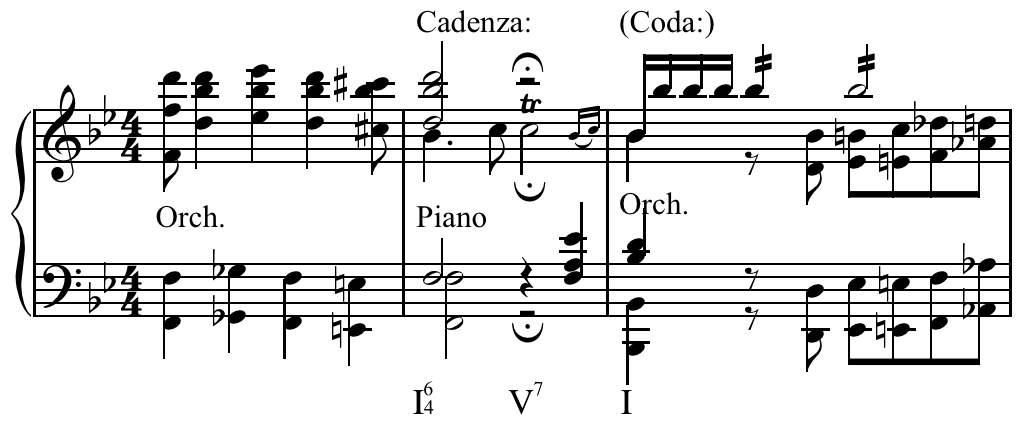
Cadenza indication from the first movement of Mozart's Piano Concerto in B♭ major, K. 595. The I^{6}_{4}–V–I progression at the cadenza is typical of the Classical concerto.

The term cadenza often refers to a portion of a concerto in which the orchestra stops playing, leaving the soloist to play alone in free time (without a strict, regular pulse) and can be written or improvised, depending on what the composer specifies. Sometimes, a cadenza will include small parts for other instruments besides the soloist; an example is in Sergei Rachmaninoff's Piano Concerto No. 3, where a solo flute, clarinet and horn are used over rippling arpeggios in the piano. A cadenza normally occurs near the end of the first movement, though it can be at any point in a concerto. An example is Tchaikovsky's First Piano Concerto, where in the first five minutes a cadenza is used. The cadenza is usually the most elaborate and virtuosic part that the solo instrument plays during the whole piece. At the end of the cadenza, the orchestra re-enters, and generally finishes off the movement on their own, or, less often, with the solo instrument.

=== Cadential trill ===
Typically during the classical period, a solo cadenza in a concerto would end with a trill, usually on the supertonic, preceding the re-entry of the orchestra for the movement's coda. Extended cadential trills were frequent in Mozart's piano concerti; they may also be found in violin concerti and concerti for stringed instruments of the period up to the early 19th century (see illustration at head of this article).

== As a vocal flourish ==
The cadenza was originally, and remains, a vocal flourish improvised by a performer to elaborate a cadence in an aria. It was later used in instrumental music, and soon became a standard part of the concerto. Cadenzas for voice and wind instruments were to be performed in one breath, and they should not use distant keys. Originally, it was improvised in this context as well, but during the 19th century, composers began to write cadenzas out in full. Third parties also wrote cadenzas for works in which it was intended by the composer to be improvised, so the soloist could have a well formed solo that they could practice in advance. Some of these have become so widely played and sung that they are effectively part of the standard repertoire, as is the case with Joseph Joachim's cadenza for Johannes Brahms' Violin Concerto, Beethoven's set of cadenzas for Mozart's Piano Concerto no. 20, and Estelle Liebling's edition of cadenzas for operas such as Donizetti's La fille du régiment and Lucia di Lammermoor.

== In jazz ==
Perhaps the most notable deviations from this tendency towards written (or absent) cadenzas are to be found in jazz, most often at the end of a ballad, though cadenzas in this genre are usually brief. Saxophonist John Coltrane, however, usually improvised an extended cadenza when performing "I Want To Talk About You", in which he showcased his predilections for scalar improvisation and multiphonics. The recorded examples of "I Want To Talk About You" (Live at Birdland and Afro Blue Impressions) are approximately 8 minutes in length, with Coltrane's unaccompanied cadenza taking up approximately 3 minutes. More sardonically, jazz critic Martin Williams once described Coltrane's improvisations on "Africa/Brass" as "essentially extended cadenzas to pieces that never get played." Equally noteworthy is saxophonist Sonny Rollins' shorter improvised cadenza at the close of "Three Little Words" (Sonny Rollins on Impulse!).

Cadenzas are also found in instrumental solos with piano or other accompaniment, where they are placed near the beginning or near the end or sometimes in both places (e.g. the cornet solo "The Maid of the Mist" by Herbert L. Clarke, or the end of "Think of Me" in Andrew Lloyd Webber's The Phantom of the Opera, where Christine Daaé sings a short but involved cadenza).

== Notable examples ==
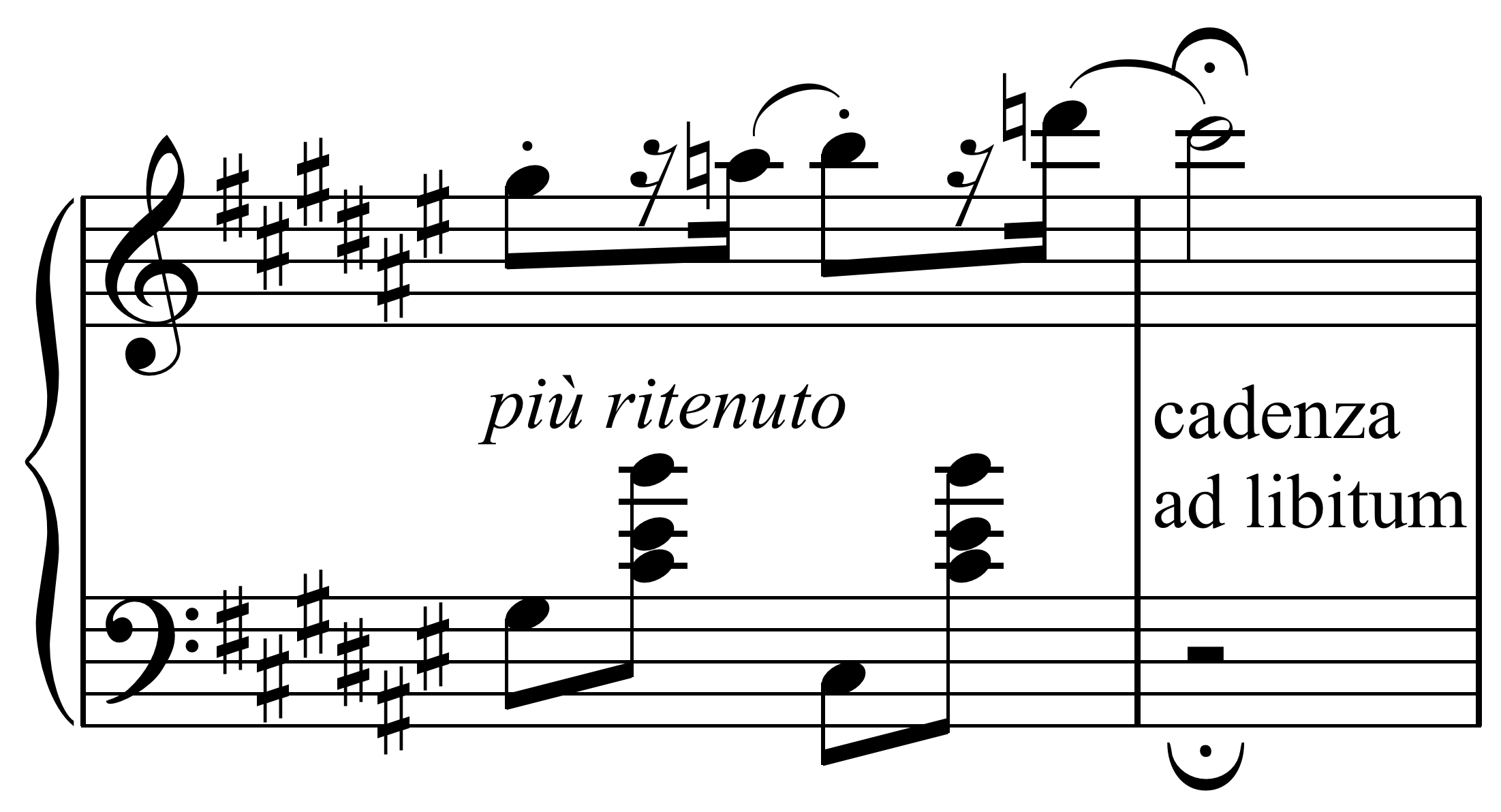
Cadenza ad libitum in Franz Liszt's Hungarian Rhapsody No. 2

- Concertos are not the only pieces that feature cadenzas; Scena di Canta Gitano, the fourth movement of Nikolai Rimsky-Korsakov's Capriccio Espagnol, contains cadenzas for horns and trumpets, violin, flute, clarinet, and harp in its beginning section.
- Johann Strauss II unusually wrote a cadenza-like solo for cello and flute for the final section of his Emperor Waltz, before the piece is brought to an end by a round of trumpets and then the whole orchestra.
- The second movement of Bach's third Brandenburg Concerto consists of just two chords; it is generally taken to indicate a cadenza to be improvised around that cadence.
- The first movement of Bach's fifth Brandenburg Concerto features an extensive written cadenza for harpsichord.
- The coloratura arias of bel canto composers Gaetano Donizetti, Vincenzo Bellini, and Gioachino Rossini.
- Mozart wrote the cadenzas for violin and viola duet in the first and second movements of the Sinfonia Concertante for Violin, Viola, and Orchestra, K. 364.
- Mozart wrote a cadenza into the third and final movement of Piano Sonata No. 13 in B-flat major, K. 333, which was an unusual (but not unique) choice at that time because the movement is otherwise in sonata-rondo form.
- Beethoven's "Emperor" Concerto contains a notated cadenza. It begins with a cadenza that is partly accompanied by the orchestra. Later in the first movement, the composer specifies that the soloist should play the music that is written out in the score, and not add a cadenza on one's own.
- Beethoven famously included a cadenza-like solo for oboe in the recapitulation section of the first movement of his Symphony No. 5.
- Tchaikovsky's first piano concerto is notable not only for having a cadenza within the first few minutes of the first movement, but also for having a second – substantially longer – cadenza in a more conventional place, near the end of the movement.
- Rachmaninoff's Piano Concerto No. 3, in which the first movement features a long and incredibly difficult toccata-like cadenza with an even longer alternative or ossia cadenza written in a heavier chordal style. Both cadenzas lead to an identical section with arpeggios in the piano and a solo flute accompanying, before the cadenza ends quietly.
- Fritz Kreisler's cadenzas for the first and third movements of Beethoven's Violin Concerto.
- Aaron Copland uses a cadenza in his Clarinet Concerto to connect the two movements.
- Karlheinz Stockhausen composed five ensemble cadenzas in his wind quintet Zeitmaße (1955–1956), cadenzas for piccolo trumpet and piccolo in Luzifers Tanz (1983), and a cadenza for cor anglais in his trio Balance (2007)
- Karol Szymanowski's two violin concertos both feature cadenzas written by the violinist who was intended to play them, Paweł Kochański.
- In the third movement of Elgar's Violin Concerto, there is an unexpected cadenza in which the orchestra supports the solo with a pizzicato tremolando effect ("cadenza accompagnato").
- Franz Liszt's Hungarian Rhapsody No. 2 for piano contains the instruction cadenza ad libitum before the final coda, meaning it is at the pianist's discretion that such a cadenza is added. Whilst most performers prefer to decline the invitation, some pianists such as Alfred Cortot, Sergei Rachmaninoff and Marc-André Hamelin have produced notable cadenzas for the work.
- Pianists Chick Corea and Makoto Ozone incorporated jazz cadenzas into an otherwise traditional performance in Japan of the third movement of Mozart’s Double Piano Concerto No. 10.
- Rimsky-Korsakov's Scheherazade features numerous cadenzas for violin.
- Mozart wrote a cadenza in his own Horn Concerto No. 3, towards the end of the first of three movements.
- Sergei Prokofiev's second piano concerto contains a taxing five-minute cadenza that closes out the first movement.
- In Dmitri Shostakovich's first cello concerto the third movement on its own is a cadenza connecting the second and fourth movements.
- Carlos Chávez's Violin Concerto has a seven-minute unaccompanied cadenza as the third of its five main sections, despite the fact that the soloist plays almost without a break throughout the rest of the 35-minute-long composition

=== Composed cadenzas ===
Composers who have written cadenzas for other performers in works not their own include:

- Carl Baermann's cadenza for the second movement of Mozart's Clarinet Concerto.
- Ludwig van Beethoven wrote cadenzas for Mozart's Piano Concerto No. 20 in D minor first and third movements.
- Joseph Joachim wrote a cadenza for Brahms's Violin Concerto.
- Benjamin Britten wrote a cadenza for Haydn's Cello Concerto No. 1 in C for Mstislav Rostropovich.
- David Johnstone wrote A Manual of Cadenzas and Cadences for Cello, pub. Creighton's Collection (2007).
- Wilhelm Kempff wrote cadenzas for Beethoven's first four piano concertos.
- Clara Schumann wrote a cadenza for Beethoven's Piano Concerto No. 3.
- Karlheinz Stockhausen composed cadenzas for two Mozart concerti for wind instruments (flute and clarinet), for Kathinka Pasveer and Suzanne Stephens, respectively, and one cadenza each for the trumpet concertos by Leopold Mozart and Joseph Haydn, for his son Markus.
- Richard Strauss wrote a vocal cadenza in 1919 for soprano Elisabeth Schumann to sing in Mozart's solo motet Exsultate, jubilate. This cadenza was sung by Kathleen Battle in her recording.
- Friedrich Wührer composed and published cadenzas for Mozart's piano concerti in C major, K. 467; C minor, K. 491; and D major, K. 537.
- Sergei Rachmaninoff wrote a cadenza for Liszt's Hungarian Rhapsody No. 2 and was recorded playing the piece with this cadenza in 1919.
- Alfred Schnittke wrote two cadenzas for Beethoven's Violin Concerto, of which the first includes musical quotations from violin concertos of Berg, Brahms, Bartók (Concertos No. 1 and No. 2), Shostakovich (Concerto No. 1), as well as from Beethoven's 7th Symphony. Schnittke also wrote a cadenza for the first movement of Mozart's Piano Concerto No. 24 in 1975.
- Fritz Kreisler composed a half polyphonic cadenza for Beethoven's Violin Concerto.
- John Williams composed a 6-minute segment consisting of a cadenza, a series of variations, and a few more elaborations to go over the opening credits of the 1971 film Fiddler on the Roof, performed by violinist Isaac Stern.
- Alma Deutscher composed a cadenza for Mozart's 8th Piano Concerto when she was ten.
- David Popper composed a set of cadenzas for 5 different concertos (Haydn's Concerto No. 2 in D major, Op. 101; Saint Saëns' Cello Concerto No. 1 in A minor, Op. 33; Schumann's Cello Concerto in A minor, Op. 129; Volkmann's Cello Concerto in A minor, Op. 33; and Molique's Cello Concerto in D major, Op. 45).
- Émile Sauret wrote a cadenza for Paganini's Violin Concerto No. 1, Op. 6.

== See also ==
- The taqsim in Middle Eastern music is a somewhat similar improvisation, albeit bound to different conventions.
