= Matty Matlock =

American Dixieland jazz clarinetist and saxophonist (1907–1978)

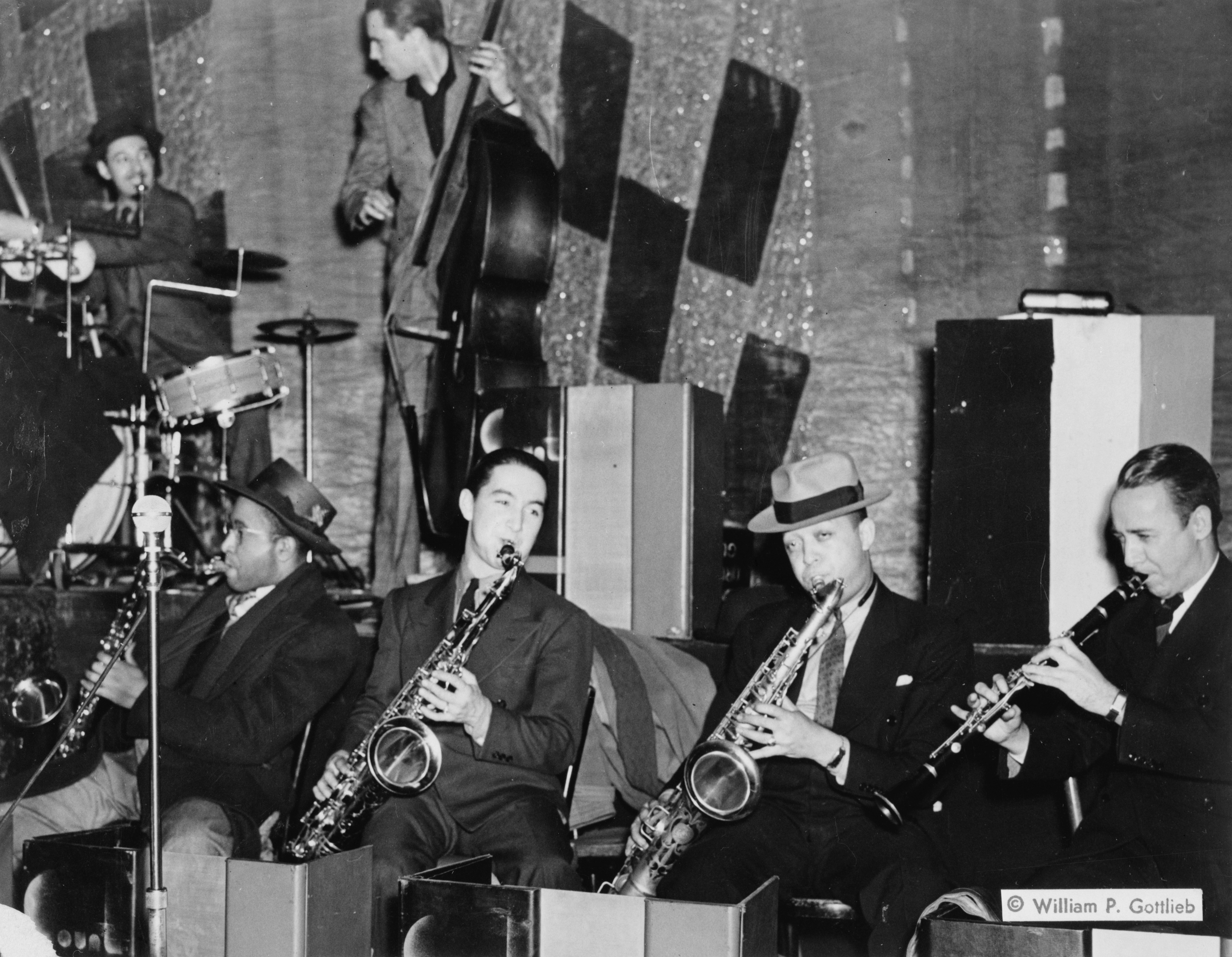
- Ray Bauduc, Herschel Evans, Bob Haggart, Eddie Miller, Lester Young, Matty Matlock, Howard Theatre, Washington D.C., ca. 1939.

Background information
- Born: Julian Clifton Matlock; April 27, 1907
- Origin: (United States) Paducah, Kentucky, U.S.
- Died: June 14, 1978 (aged 71)
- Genres: Dixieland; Swing
- Instruments: Saxophone; Clarinet
- Years active: 1950s – 1970s

Julian Clifton "Matty" Matlock (April 27, 1907 – June 14, 1978) was an American Dixieland jazz clarinettist, saxophonist and arranger.

== Early years ==
Matlock was born in Paducah, Kentucky, April 27, 1907, and raised in Nashville beginning in 1917. He began playing clarinet when he was 12.

== Career ==
From 1929 to 1934, Matlock replaced Benny Goodman in the Ben Pollack band doing arrangements and performing on clarinet.

Matlock was one of the main arrangers for Bob Crosby's band. He had joined Crosby's group in 1935 as clarinettist, playing with both the main Crosby band and the smaller Bobcats group, but "he was often seconded to write full-time for the orchestra and the Bobcats." He stayed with Crosby until the band broke up in 1942. Matlock's entry in The Rough Guide to Jazz says of him (in part): "Matty Matlock was, with Irving Fazola, the most inspired and spontaneous clarinettist in the Dixieland style, and as a truly original arranger he perfected the sound of 'arranged white Dixieland' as we know it today."

After the dissolution of Crosby's group, Matlock worked in Los Angeles, playing for recordings made by a variety of Dixieland groups. In 1955, he appeared in the film Pete Kelly's Blues, playing clarinet for a band that is seen in a scene in a Kansas City speakeasy in 1927.

== Death ==
Matlock died June 14, 1978, in Los Angeles, California.

== Select discography ==
As bandleader

- Dixieland (Douglass Phonodisc)
- Four-Button Dixie (Douglass Phonodisc, 1959) [credited as Matty Matlock and the Paducah Patrol]
- They Made It Twice As Nice As Paradise And They Called It Dixieland (Douglass Phonodisc)

With Bing Crosby

- Play a Simple Melody / Sam's Song (also with Gary Crosby) (Decca Records)
- Moonlight Bay (also with Gary Crosby) (Decca Records)
- In the Cool, Cool, Cool of the Evening (also with Jane Wyman) (Decca Records)
- Bing with a Beat (RCA Records)

With Ella Fitzgerald

- Ella Fitzgerald Sings the Irving Berlin Song Book (Verve Records)

With Ray Heindorf

- Pete Kelly's Blues (Columbia Records)

With Ben Pollack

- Ben Pollack's Pick-A-Rib Boys: Dixieland (Savoy Records)
- Dixieland Vols. 1, 2 & 3 (Savoy Records)

With Beverly Jenkins

- Gordon Jenkins Presents My Wife The Blues Singer (Impulse!)
