= Bewitched, Bothered and Bewildered =

1940 popular song by Rodgers and Hart

"Bewitched (Bothered and Bewildered)"

Song
- Published: 1941 by Chappell & Co.
- Composer: Richard Rodgers
- Lyricist: Lorenz Hart

"Bewitched (Bothered and Bewildered)" is a show tune and popular song from the 1940 Rodgers and Hart musical Pal Joey. It is part of the Great American Songbook. The song was introduced by Vivienne Segal on December 25, 1940, in the Broadway production during Act I, Scene 6, and again in Act II, Scene 4, as a reprise. Segal also sang the song on both the 1950 hit record and in the 1952 Broadway revival. It was performed by Carol Bruce in the 1954 London production.

== Chart versions ==
- Doris Day with The Mellomen and orchestra conducted by John Rarig
  - Columbia 38698 (matrix: HCO 3765-1N)
  - Recorded: May 13, 1949
  - Peak Billboard chart position: No. 9
- Bill Snyder
  - Billboard year-end top 30 singles of 1950 No. 24
- Gordon Jenkins and orchestra with vocal chorus by Bonnie Lou Williams
  - Decca 24983
  - Peak Billboard chart position: No. 6
  - Billboard year-end top 30 singles of 1950 No. 26
- Jan August orchestra and The Harmonicats
  - Mercury 5399
  - Peak Billboard chart position: No. 17
- Larry Green
  - RCA Victor 20-3726
  - Peak Billboard chart position: No. 15
- Mel Tormé & Dave Lambert Singers with orchestra directed by Pete Rugolo
  - Capitol 1000 (matrix: 5719-Y)
  - Recorded: April 3, 1950
  - Peak Billboard radio popularity chart position: No. 10

== Rod Stewart and Cher version ==
"Bewitched, Bothered & Bewildered"

Single by Rod Stewart and Cher

from the album As Time Goes By: The Great American Songbook, Volume II
- Released: October 2003
- Genre: Jazz standard
- Label: J Records
- Songwriters: Richard Rodgers; Lorenz Hart
- Producer: Richard Perry

Rod Stewart singles chronology
"Time After Time" (2003)	"Bewitched, Bothered and Bewildered" (2003)	"What a Wonderful World" (2004)

Cher singles chronology
"Love One Another" (2003)	"Bewitched, Bothered and Bewildered" (2003)	"You Haven't Seen the Last of Me" (2010)

Licensed audio
- "Bewitched, Bothered & Bewildered" on YouTube

In 2003 the song was released as a duet by Rod Stewart and Cher, as a single from his second pop standards album, As Time Goes By: the Great American Songbook 2. It was released in 2003 by J Records. The song was called a 'delicious duet' in a review by Billboard Magazine. The cover also became a moderate hit on the Adult Contemporary chart in the United States, peaking at number 17.

=== Weekly charts ===
Chart (2003)	Peak position
US Adult Contemporary (Billboard)	17
Quebec (ADISQ)	13

== References in popular culture ==
It is mentioned several times in the TV series Dynasty as being the favorite song of Blake (John Forsythe) and Alexis (Joan Collins). They dance to it in Season 7 Episode 28, "Shadow Play", which originally aired on May 6, 1987.

A reference to the song is also made in the title of one episode of Bewitched (Season 8 Episode 5), "Bewitched, Bothered and Baldoni".

The song title is referenced by the title of the 9-1-1 episode "Buck, Bothered, and Bewildered" (Season 7 Episode 4). An instrumental piano version of the song appears in the following episode "You Don't Know Me" (Season 7 Episode 5).

The song appeared twice on The Crown (episodes "Hyde Park Corner" and "Ritz", the latter played at the ending credits), it was sung in a duet by King George VI (Jared Harris) and Princess Margaret (Vanessa Kirby).

The song was featured in both the 2004 play and the 2006 movie, The History Boys, as sung by Samuel Barnett’s character, Posner, a young, love-struck Jewish gay boy in reference to his unrequited crush on Dominic Cooper’s character, Dakin.

Walt Kelly created three recurring characters for his comic strip Pogo, named Bewitched, Bothered, and Bemildred, who were anthropomorphic bats wearing derby hats.
