= Trumpet Concerto (Arutiunian) =

1950 composition by Alexander Arutiunian

Alexander Arutiunian’s Trumpet Concerto in A♭ major (1950) is the Armenian composer's sixth major composition, a "virtuoso showpiece" composed in 1949–1950. According to J. Sundram, "it is an energetic powerhouse of Eastern European lyricism and harmonic textures".

Arutiunian's engaging and idiomatic trumpet concerto was "quickly assimilated into the standard trumpet repertoire worldwide, earning highest international praise from audiences, critics and performers". In an interview with Allan Kozinn of The New York Times, Philip Smith, the former principal trumpeter of the New York Philharmonic, observed that Arutiunian's Trumpet Concerto was frequently chosen as an audition piece at Juilliard. "One of the reasons this piece has become so popular..." Smith said, "is just that it's a flashy piece. It has a very gypsyish, Russian, Armenian kind of sound, with very soulful, beautiful melodies and plenty of exciting rapid-tonguing kind of things.'" Professor Anatoly Selyanin related in 2004, "In January I headed the jury of an American competition devoted to the Arutiunian trumpet concerto. 34 trumpeters played only this concerto." Selyanin said that "even a dog", if admitted to a performance, would recognise the musical structure at once and "know that in eight steps the concerto will be complete"... This work is an excellent example of the impact that Armenian folk culture had on Arutiunian's compositions, showcased through improvisational-sounding melodies from the Ashik (ashug) tradition, and the consistent use of the augmented second throughout the piece.

== Structure ==
Arutiunian's concerto for trumpet was conceived of and written as a single-movement concerto with an extended lyrical episode. The consists of seven major sections which are all performed without break:

1. Andante maestoso
2. Allegro energico
3. Meno mosso
4. Tempo I
5. Meno mosso
6. Tempo I
7. Cadenza & Coda

The melodic and rhythmic characteristics of Armenian folk music strongly influenced all of Arutiunian's work, but all of the melodies contained in the trumpet concerto are original (no borrowed folk tunes).

== Instrumentation ==
The piece is scored for solo trumpet, 2 flutes (second doubles piccolo), 2 oboes, 2 clarinets, 2 bassoons, 4 horns, 2 trumpets, 3 trombones, 1 tuba, timpani, percussion (bass drum, cymbals, snare drum, triangle), harp and strings.

== Performers ==
Premiere recording was made by Armenian trumpeter Haykaz Mesiayan of the Bolshoi Theater Orchestra, and conductor Odyssey Dimitriadi in 1951.

Recording by the Soviet trumpeter Timofei Dokschitzer was instrumental in making the concerto famous. He visited the US in concert and performed the concerto there, although Roger Voisin is credited with the US premiere of the concerto, performing it with the Boston Pops Orchestra in 1966.

Other noted performers of the concerto include:

- Maurice André
- Alison Balsom
- Tine Thing Helseth
- David Hickman
- Maurice Murphy
- Matthias Höfs
- Sergei Nakariakov
- Geoffrey Payne
- Heidi Rogers
- Arturo Sandoval
- Rolf Smedvig
- Philip Smith, the principal trumpet of the New York Philharmonic.
- Lucienne Renaudin Vary
- Michael S. Brown Jr.
- Patricia Vörös Ungarn Münster Symphonic Orchestra Germany

== Discography ==
=== CD ===
- Bernard Soustrot [trumpet], Philharmonic Orchestra "Des Pays de la Loire," Marc Soustrot [conductor]. France: Pierre Verany PV. 788011, 1987.
- Timofei Dokshizer [trumpet], The Bolshoi Theatre Orchestra, Gennady Rozhdestvensky. Bulgaria: TD - 950101- AT, 2000.
- Jouko Harjanne [trumpet], Kuopio Symphony Orchestra, Pekka Savijoki. Finland.
- Arturo Sandoval [trumpet], London Symphony orchestra, Luis Has [conductor]. USA: RCA Victor 09026-62661-2, 1994.
- James Watson [trumpet], "The Black Dyke Mills" Orchestra, Roger Harvey [trumpet]. USA: Doy CD 036, 1994.
- Bibi Black [trumpet], Moscow Chamber Orchestra, Constantin Orbelian [conductor]. England: Chandos CHAN 9668, 2000.
- Alison Balsom [trumpet], BBC Scottish Symphony Orchestra, Lawrence Renes [conductor]. EMI 6785902, 2012.
- John Holt (trumpet), University of North Texas Symphony Orchestra, Anshel Brusilow, Conductor. Crystal Records CD769

=== LP ===
- Timofei Dokshitser [trumpet], The Orchestra of the Bolshoi Theatre, Gennady Rojdestvenskiy [conductor]. USSR: Melodiya (D-025139), 1969. Also released as: USSR: Melodiya (SM-02273), 1970; USSR: Melodiya (S10-06785), 1976; Berlin, DDR: VEB Deutsche Schallplatten (SM-02273); Melodiya/Angel (SR-1-40149);
- Vaclav Yunek [trumpet], Prague Symphony Orchestra, Vaclav Neumann [conductor]. Supraphon (SUF 20132), 1963.
- Maurice Andre [trumpet], De l'Office de Radiodifffusion Television Francaise, Moris Suzan [conductor]. France: STU 70714 A. Also released as France: STU 70915 B and Japan: Victor (vic-2015).
- Concerto for trumpet and orchestra. Anatoly Maksimenko [trumpet], Bolshoi Theatre Orchestra, Boris Haykin [conductor]. USSR: Melodiya 33D-015506, 1965.
