= Patricia (1950 song) =

"Patricia" is a popular song, written by Benny Davis. The song was published in 1950. Perry Como recorded the song on August 10, 1950, and it was released on the following single records:

- In the United States by RCA, as a 78 rpm single (catalog number 20-3905-A) and a 45 rpm single (catalog number 47-3905-A), with the flip side "Watchin' the Trains Go By". This record spent 12 weeks on the Billboard chart, beginning on September 22, 1950, and reached No. 7.
- In the United Kingdom by His Master's Voice, as a 78 rpm single (catalogue number B-10010) in January 1951, with the flip side "So Long Sally".
- In Australia by HMV, as a 78 rpm single (catalogue number EA 3951) in 1951, with the flip side "If You Were My Girl".
