= Violin Concerto (Chávez) =

Work for violin by Carlos Chávez

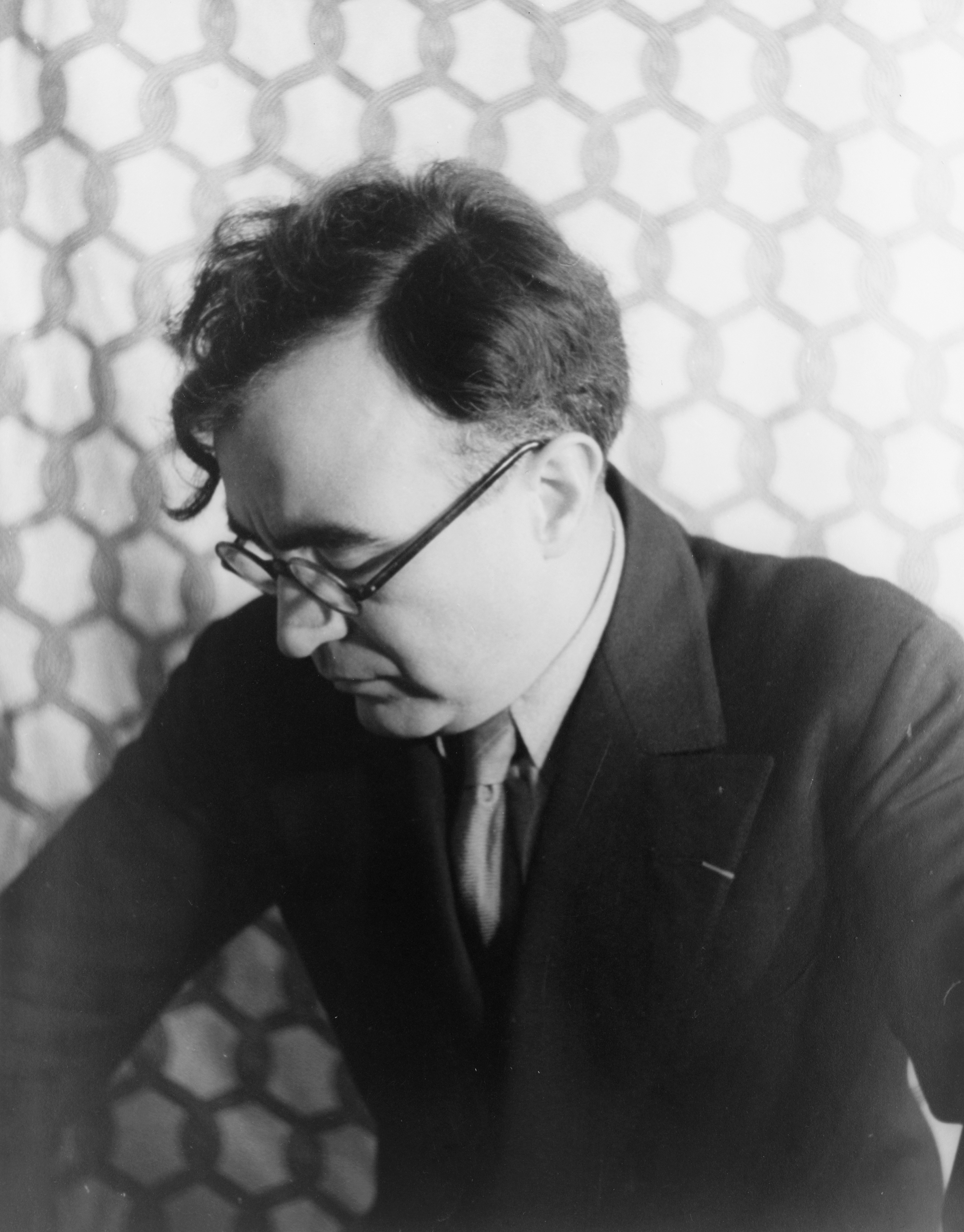
Carlos Chávez

Carlos Chávez's Violin Concerto is a work for violin and orchestra composed between 1945 and 1950 for the American violinist Viviane Bertolami. Originally 45 minutes in length, it was shortened soon after its first performance to a duration of approximately 35 minutes.

== History ==
On 10 January 1947 Murray D. Kirkwood, a public-relations writer for IT&T in New York, wrote Chávez a letter requesting a violin concerto for the professional debut of his then-twenty-year-old wife, Viviane Bertolami. Chávez set to work right away (in fact, he had already begun to sketch a violin concerto in 1945, during a rail journey in the United States), but it was another three-and-a-half years before the score was completed, in July 1950. The concerto was premiered in Mexico City on 29 February 1952 by the composer conducting the Orquesta Sinfónica Nacional, with Viviane Bertolami as the soloist. Less than a month later, Chávez conducted the American premiere, again with Bertolami as soloist, with the Los Angeles Philharmonic on 27 March 1952. By this time Chávez had shortened the concerto from the 45-minute version originally heard in Mexico City to just over 35 minutes.

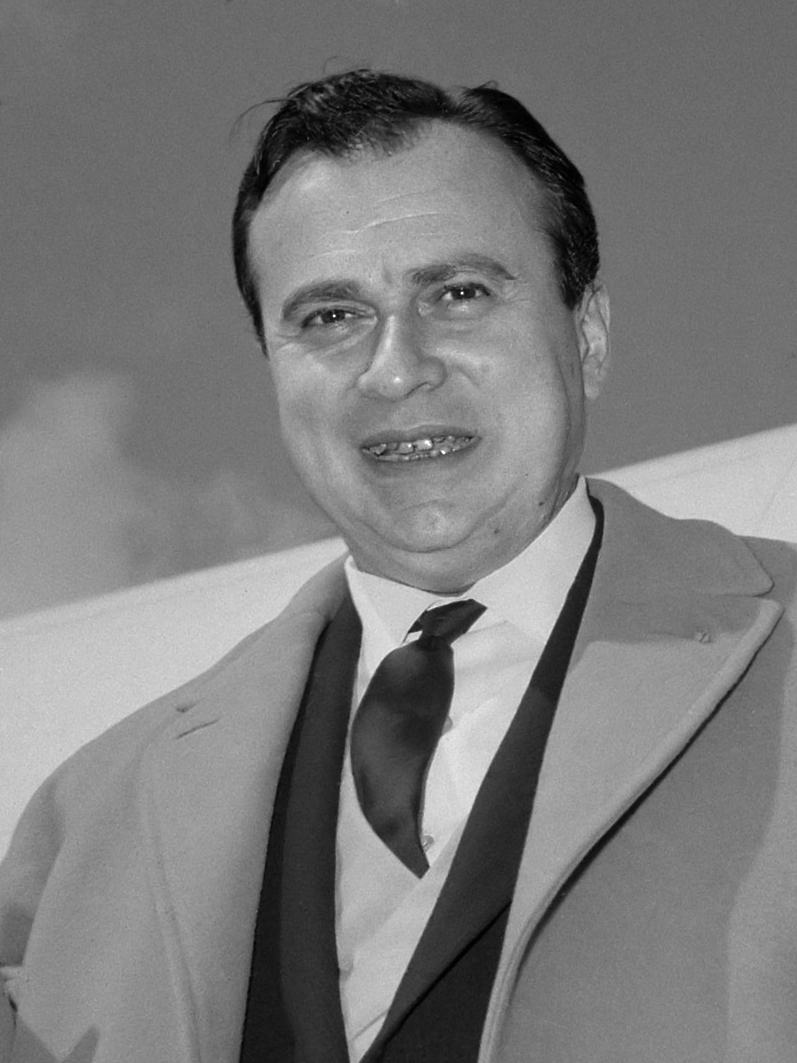
Henryk Szeryng

A decade later, Chávez succeeded in interesting the Polish-Mexican violinist Henryk Szeryng in the concerto, and eventually Szeryng gave the New York premiere, on 7 October 1965, with the New York Philharmonic conducted by Leonard Bernstein. In August 1966 Szeryng recorded the concerto under the composer's baton, with the Orquesta Sinfónica Nacional, for CBS Masterworks, though against the composer's wishes he cut twenty-five bars from the cadenza.

Shortly after recording the concerto, Szeryng also gave its European premiere, at the Edinburgh Festival on 7 September 1966 in the Usher Hall, with the BBC Scottish Symphony Orchestra conducted by James Loughran.

== Analysis ==
The Violin Concerto has an unusual construction. Though played without any breaks, it has four movements which recur in reverse order following the central cadenza for the solo violin: Andante – Allegro – Largo – Scherzo – Cadenza – Scherzo – Largo – Allegro – Andante. The repetitions function in part as recapitulation but, because the material is considerably varied and transformed, also serve as development. The motivic material in the second half appears almost always in inverted form, with respect to the first half.

The scherzo movement is cast as a theme and variations, with the cadenza interrupting after the third variation. The long and complex cadenza is structurally critical, representing the overall shift in the concerto's tonality from the opening movement's D minor to the conclusion in F major. The scherzo had begun in D major, but after the cadenza it resumes in F. Viviane Bertolami herself (quoted from a telephone interview in García Morillo) characterised the seven-minute cadenza as "the heart of the Concerto but not its climax", and found its most impish aspect to be that the considerable technical difficulties are evident only to other violinists, whereas it must be made to seem clear, clean, and simple to the audience.

The soloist plays almost continuously, with the exception of two tutti orchestral passages. The first is a transition between the end of the first Allegro and the following Largo; the second constitutes the entire second appearance of the scherzo and half of the return of the Largo.

== Discography ==
- Carlos Chávez: Concerto for Violin and Orchestra; Buxtehude (arr. Chávez): Chaconne in E Minor. Henryk Szeryng, violin; Orquesta Sinfónica Nacional de México; Carlos Chávez, cond. Recorded 6 August 1966, Mexico City. LP recording, 1 disc, 33⅓ rpm, 12 in., stereo. CBS Masterworks 32 11 0064 New York: CBS Masterworks, 1967.
- Carlos Chávez: Dos conciertos. Jorge Federico Osorio, piano; Pablo Roberto Diemecke, violin; Orquesta Sinfónica Nacional de México, Enrique Arturo Diemecke, conductor. CD recording, 1 disc, 4¾ in., stereo. Spartacus SDX27299. Clásicos Mexicanos. Mexico: Spartacus, 2001. [The Violin Concerto is given in an unauthorised abridged version made by Enrique Arturo Diemecke
