= Symphony No. 8 (Villa-Lobos) =

1950 composition by Heitor Villa-Lobos

- by Heitor Villa-Lobos
- Villa-Lobos in June 1952
- Catalogue: W510
- Composed: 1950
- Dedication: Olin Downes
- Published: 1978
- Duration: 25 mins
- Movements: Four

Premiere
- Date: 14 January 1955
- Location: Carnegie Hall, New York
- Conductor: Heitor Villa-Lobos
- Performers: Philadelphia Orchestra

Symphony No. 8 is a composition by the Brazilian composer Heitor Villa-Lobos, written in 1950. A typical performance lasts about 25 minutes.

It was first performed at Carnegie Hall in New York on 14 January 1955 by the Philadelphia Orchestra, conducted by the composer. The European premiere took place shortly afterward, on 15 March 1955 at the Salle Gaveau in Paris. The performers were the Orchestra of the Concert Society of the Paris Conservatory, conducted by the composer.

The piece is dedicated to The New York Times music critic Olin Downes.

== Instrumentation ==
The symphony is scored for an orchestra consisting of 2 piccolos, 2 flutes, 2 oboes, cor anglais, 2 clarinets, bass clarinet, 2 bassoons, contrabassoon, 4 horns, 4 trumpets, 4 trombones, tuba, percussion (timpani, tam-tam, cymbals, and xylophone), celesta, 2 harps, piano, and strings.

== Analysis ==
The symphony has four movements:

1. Andante
2. Lento (assai)
3. Allegretto scherzando
4. Allegro (giusto)

This is according to Villa-Lobos, sua obra and Latin American Music Center. The liner card and electronic track listing for the CPO CD of the work (CPO 999 517-2) gives:

1. Andante – Allegro – Tempo I
2. Lento assai
3. Allegro giusto
4. Molto allegro

With the exception of the expanded listing of the first movement, however, the booklet accompanying the CD agrees with the two Villa-Lobos catalogues. Enyart gives a slightly different version, with the Portuguese spelling, justo, in place of the Italian giusto in the last movement:

1. Andante – Allegro
2. Lento
3. Allegretto scherzando
4. Allegro justo
