= Cenobio Hernandez =

Mexican-American composer

Cenobio Hernández (1863–1950) was a Mexican-American composer, born in San Luis Potosi, Mexico and died in San Antonio, Texas.

He began by playing cello and eventually moved to bass, bajo sexto, and other stringed instruments. While in Mexico, Cenobio's father, Don Cenobio, taught his children the fine art of music, providing to them a rigorous musical education. Cenobio Hernández was heavily active in the late 1920s performing in orchestras in the silent film industry. After moving away from Mexico, he settled in San Antonio, Texas and performed at the Majestic, the Empire, and the Palace theaters in San Antonio, Texas at the turn-of-the-century. In 1927, when the silent film industry moved into the "talking film" industry, Cenobio Hernández began to focus his time on composing music.

Although he did not play piano, Cenobio wrote several compositions for piano. He wrote many upbeat polkas, marked with trance-like, hypnotic harmonies (chordal structures) and careful, elegant melodies (marked with unexpected movements and unique transitions). Inspired in an instant, Cenobio would use a pencil to write ideas on paper bags and other everyday materials, hand-drawing the staff lines, the harmony, and then the melody.

The music of Cenobio Hernandez, although not well known, has been featured in some of the least expected instances. Ice skaters Liz Punsalan and Jerod Shallow (of the U.S. team) used some of Hernández's compositions as background for their 1994 and 1998 Olympic competitions in Lillehammer, Norway, and Nagano, Japan.

While over 100 polkas and waltzes exist, the oldest piece discovered, which was composed by Cenobio Hernández, was written in 1896.
