= Play a Simple Melody =

1914 song by Irving Berlin

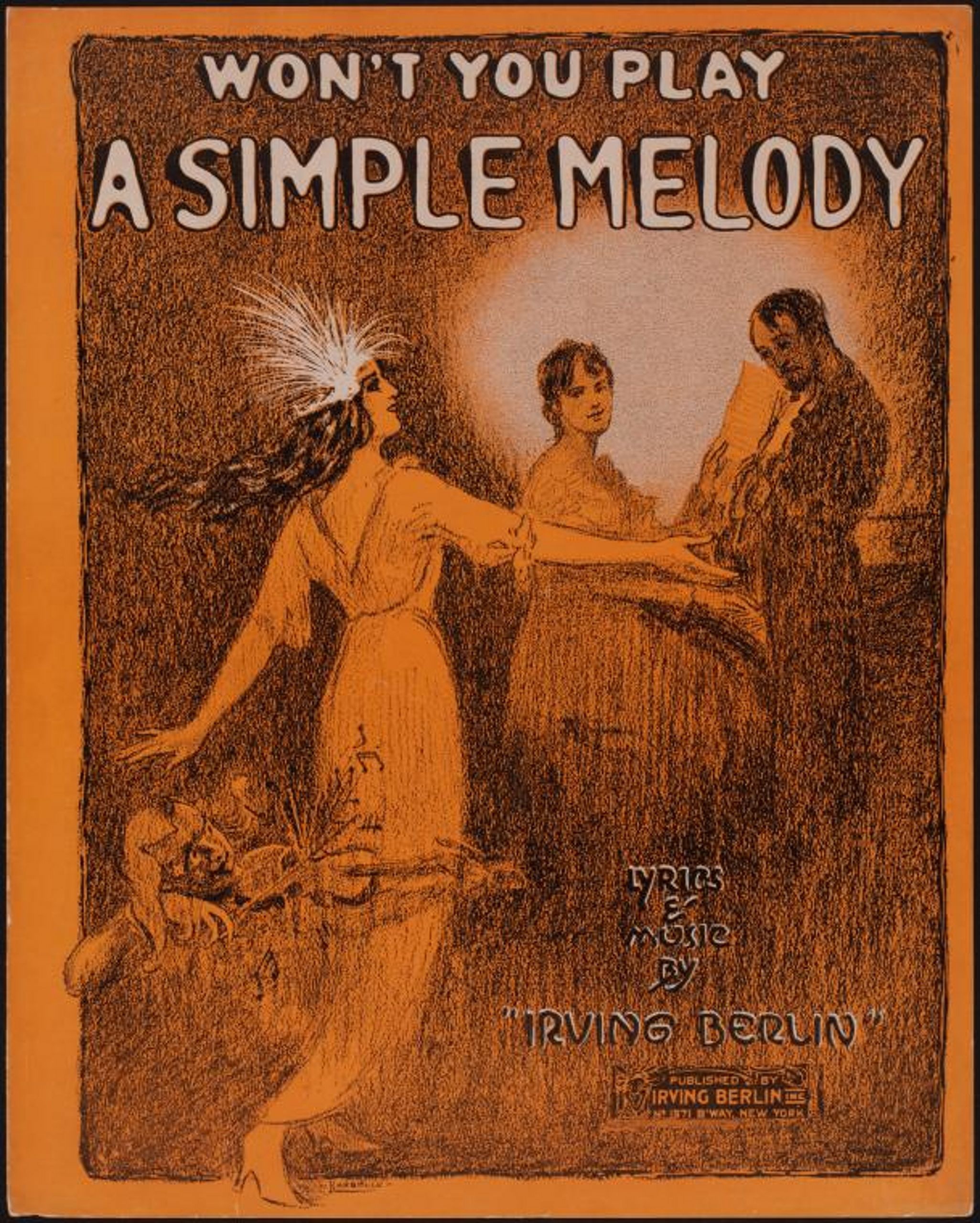
- 1914 sheet music cover

Song
- Published: 1914
- Genre: Traditional pop
- Songwriter: Irving Berlin

"Play a Simple Melody" is a song from the 1914 musical, Watch Your Step, with words and music by Irving Berlin.

== Background ==
The show was the first stage musical that Berlin wrote. It ran for 175 performances at the New Amsterdam Theater in New York City. The one song from the show that is well-remembered today is "Play a Simple Melody," one of the few true examples of counterpoint in American popular music — a melody running against a second melody, each with independent lyrics. In the printed music, first the "simple melody" plays alone. Then comes the contrasting melody. Finally, the two play together. The lyrics of "Play a Simple Melody" also track the counterpoint duet in that one singer yearns for the music which mother sang (the style of a bygone generation), but the other singer disdains such classic fare as lacking interest and rhythm. When "Play a Simple Melody" was published, ragtime was in its heyday, led by its most consummate composer, Scott Joplin. In a famous 1916 recording of the song, while Elsie Baker (using her stage name "Edna Brown") wants what she considers simplicity, Billy Murray explicitly asks for "rag". The song was also recorded by Walter Van Brunt and Mary Carson in 1915.

== Film appearances ==
"Play a Simple Melody" was featured in the 1954 movie There's No Business Like Show Business, a movie starring Ethel Merman, Dan Dailey, Donald O'Connor, Johnnie Ray, Mitzi Gaynor, and Marilyn Monroe showcasing Irving Berlin songs from the whole of his career. In the movie, Merman and Dailey sang the song in a vaudeville sequence.

== 1950 recordings ==
- A duet by Bing and Gary Crosby with Matty Matlock's All Stars (listed on the label as "Gary Crosby and Friend with Matty Matlock's All Stars") was recorded on June 23, 1950, and became a hit recording in 1950 reaching the No. 2 position in the Billboard charts. It was released by Decca Records as catalog number 27112 with the flip side "Sam's Song." Other charted versions in 1950 were by Jo Stafford (#18), Georgia Gibbs with Bob Crosby (#25) and Phil Harris (#30).

== Other recordings ==
- Horst Jankowski revived the song for his More Genius of Jankowski (1966) His version also peaked at #19 on Billboard's Easy Listening chart.

== Popular culture ==
- In the 1960s, the song was the basis of a sketch on the Morecambe & Wise show featuring their writers Dick Hills and Sid Green; it was later reprised on their 1976 Christmas Show with Elton John.
- Jean Stapleton performed the song with Fozzie Bear on episode 306 of The Muppet Show, premiered on October 5, 1978.
