= Alexander Arutiunian =

Armenian composer, pianist

Alexander Harutiunian Ալեքսանդր Հարությունյան
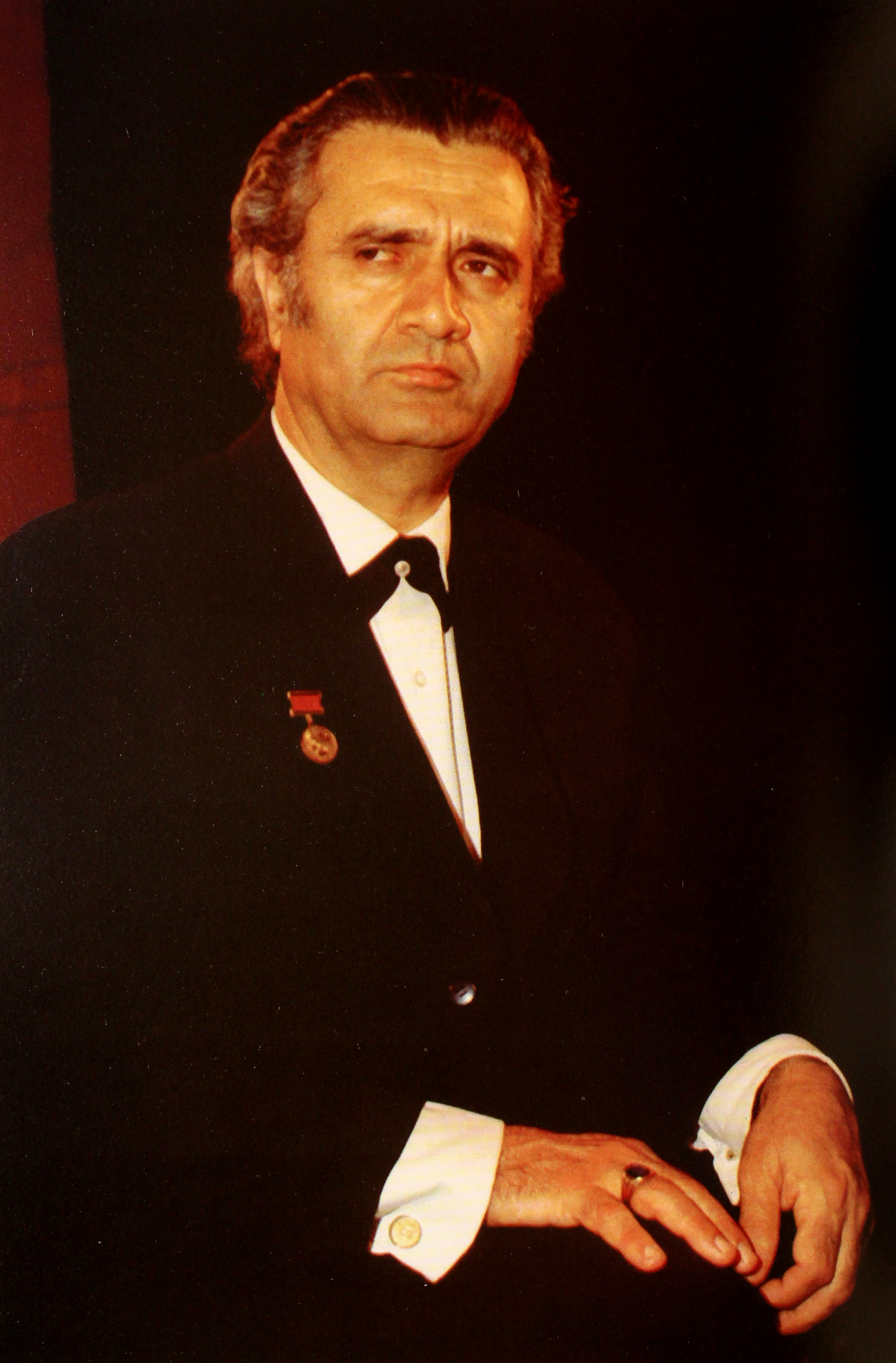
- Harutiunian in 2008 in Yerevan

Background information
- Born: 23 September 1920; Yerevan, First Republic of Armenia
- Died: 28 March 2012 (aged 91) Yerevan, Armenia
- Genre: Classical music
- Occupations: Composer, pianist
- Years active: 1920s – 2012

Alexander Grigori Arutiunian (Note: Armenian: Ալեքսանդր Գրիգորի Հարությունյան, romanized: Alek’sandr Grigori Harowt’yownyan, also given variously as Arutunian, Arutyunyan, Arutjunjan, Harutyunian, and Harutiunian) (23 September 1920 – 28 March 2012), was a Soviet and Armenian composer and pianist, widely known for his 1950 Trumpet Concerto. A professor at Yerevan State Conservatory, he was recognized with many awards for his work, including the Stalin Prize in 1949 and People's Artist of the USSR in 1970, as well as numerous honors from his homeland of Armenia.

== Biography ==
Alexander Arutiunian was born in Yerevan, First Republic of Armenia on 23 September 1920. He was the son of Grigor and Eleonora Arutiunian. His father was a military serviceman. In 1927, Arutiunian became a member of the Yerevan State Conservatory's children group, then, at age 14, he was admitted to the Conservatory to the studios of Olga Babasyan (piano), and Sergei Barkhudaryan and Vardges Talyan (composition). He graduated from the Music Conservatory of Yerevan on the eve of World War II.

After the war Arutiunian moved to Moscow, where between 1946 and 1948 he participated in the workshops of House of Armenian Culture, and studied composition with Genrikh Litinsky. After graduation he returned to Yerevan to teach at the local Conservatory and in 1954 he was appointed artistic director of the Armenian State Philharmony. He was also a member of the Board of the Union of Soviet Composers, as well as of the Armenian SSR Composers' Union.

In 1949, Arutiunian was awarded the Stalin Prize for his cantata Motherland, a graduation piece he wrote as a student at the Moscow Conservatory. The USSR Radio Choir and Orchestra premiered this work in November 1948.

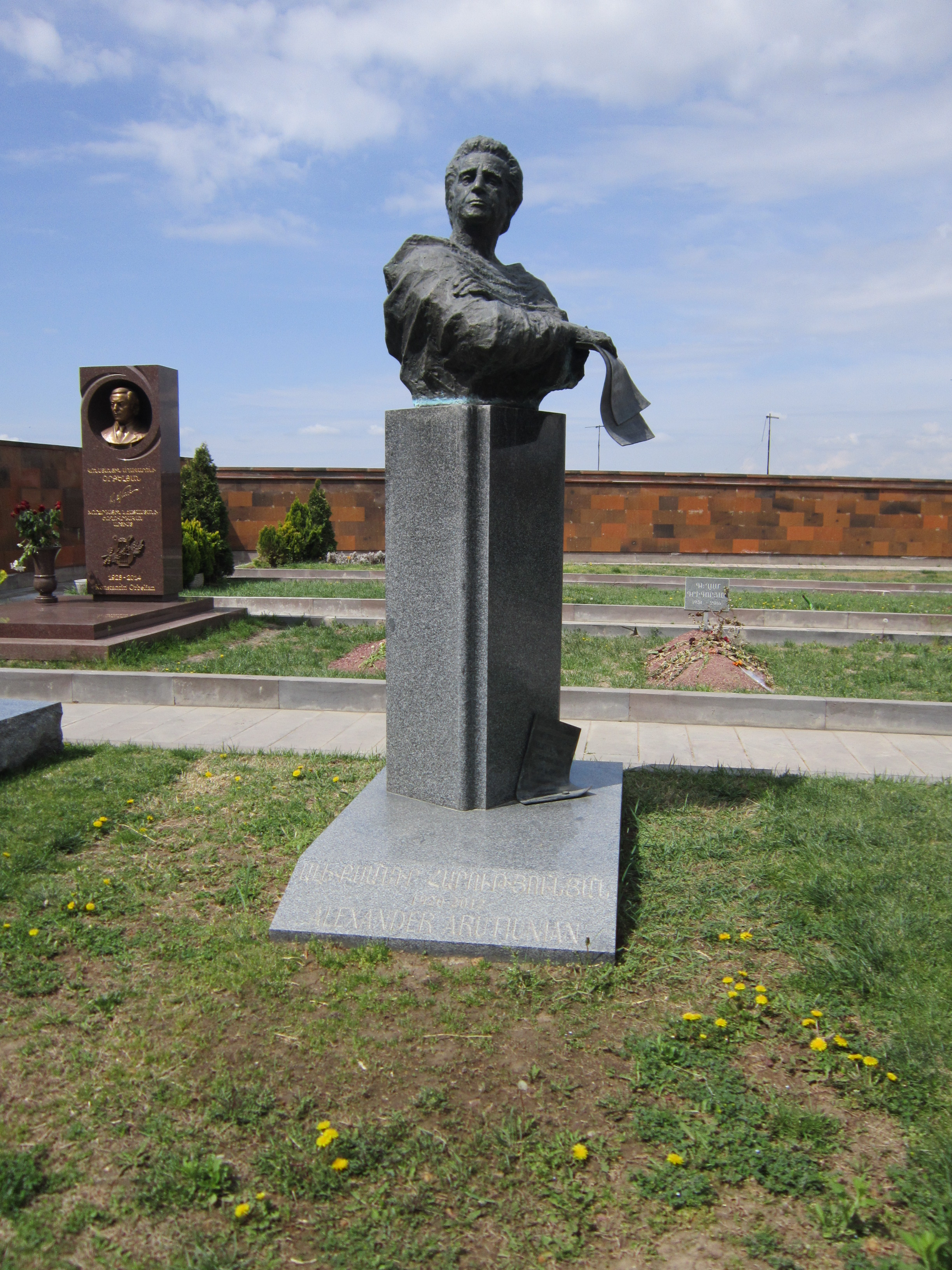
Arutiunian's tombstone

In 1949, Arutiunian composed the "Festive Overture" that was first performed in the Big Hall of the Leningrad Philharmonic in November 1949, with Yevgeny Mravinsky conducting. During the Moscow Music Congress Aram Khachaturian considered him as a promising Soviet composer. He continued to win acclaim at home and abroad for his works, many of which are quickened by the folk traditions of Armenian music. Other works of that kind include The Tale of Armenian People (1960), Ode to Lenin (1967) and Hymn to Brotherhood (1970).

Some of Arutiunian's works for wind instruments include his 1950 concerto for trumpet, the concerto for tuba, and the brass quintet Armenian Scenes. In 1988, inspired by the Spitak earthquake, Arutiunian composed his Concerto for Violin and String Orchestra, Armenia-88 (dedicated to Ruben Aharonyan). The premiere took place in Yerevan in 1989.

== Trumpet Concerto in A-flat major (1950) ==
Arutiunian's Trumpet Concerto consists of seven continuous sections, although the work is categorized as a single movement:

1. Andante maestoso
2. Allegro energico
3. Meno mosso
4. Tempo I
5. Meno mosso
6. Tempo I
7. Cadenza & Coda

The melodic and rhythmic characteristics of Armenian folk music are a strong influence in Arutiunian's work. As a composer, he expressed his nationality by incorporating the flavor of ashughner (folk minstrel) improvisations. At the time the concerto was written, his compositional style was similar to Khachaturian's. However, in the 1960s he tended towards classical forms and clearer tonality.

Arutiunian's trumpet concerto was his sixth major composition, written in 1950. Arutiunian originally intended to write it in 1943 for a student of Tabakov, Zsolak Vartasarian, who was the principal trumpet in the Armenian Philharmonic Orchestra. However, Vartasarian died in the war and the concerto was not completed until 1950, so Aykaz Messlayan was the first performer of the concerto and Timofei Dokschitzer was the first to record this concerto.

The concerto's introduction to the United States is solely due to Dokschitzer, a leading Soviet Russian trumpeter.

== Personal life ==
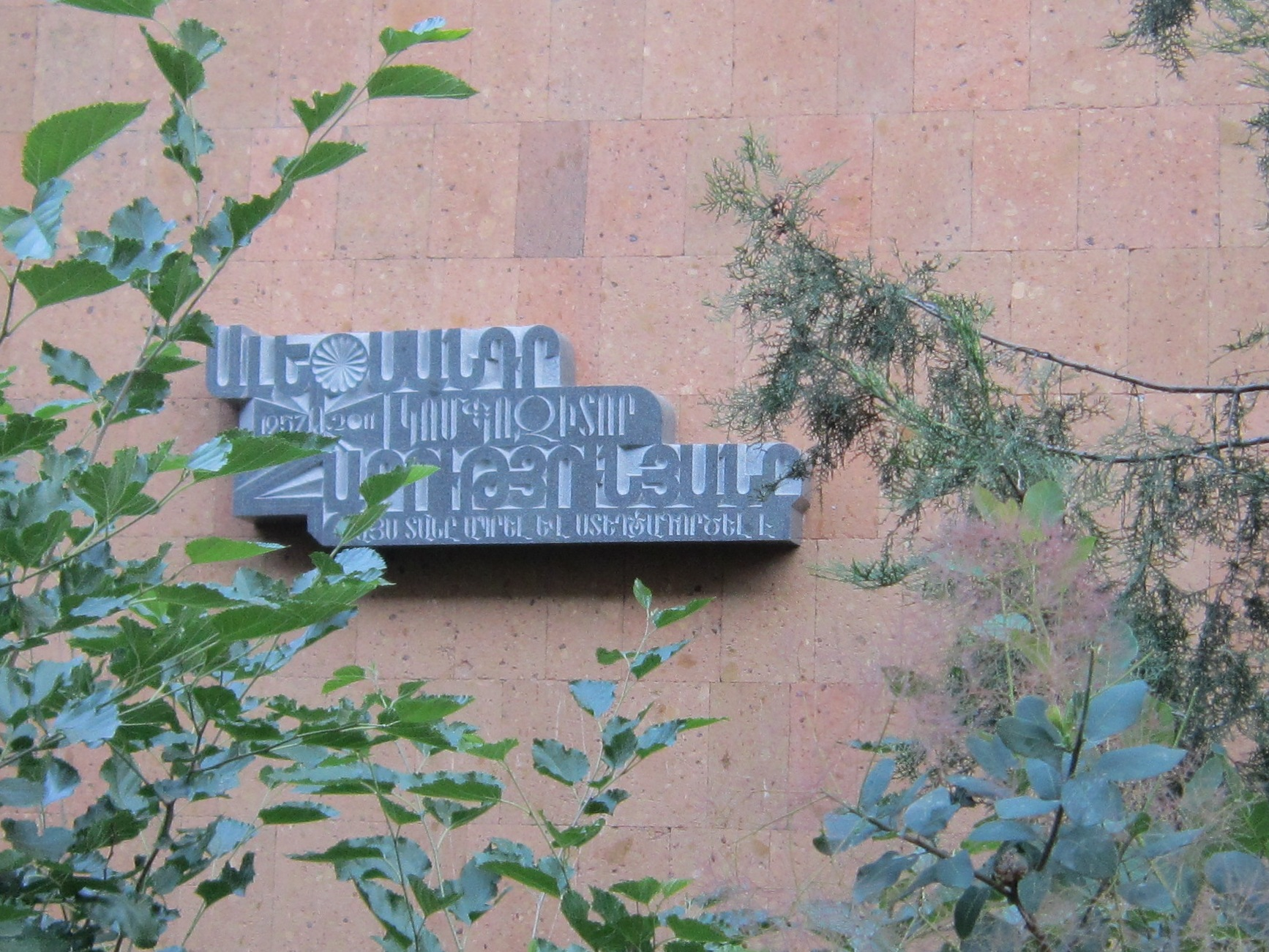
Arutiunian's memorial plaque in Yerevan

In 1950, Arutiunian married Irina (Tamara) Odenova. Their marriage produced two children, a daughter, Narine (born 1951), who is a pianist and lawyer; and a son, Suren (born 1953), who is an artist-designer. His extended family includes three granddaughters and a grandson. He died aged 91 in his home city of Yerevan. Arutiunian is buried at the Komitas Pantheon which is located in the city center of Yerevan.

== Awards ==
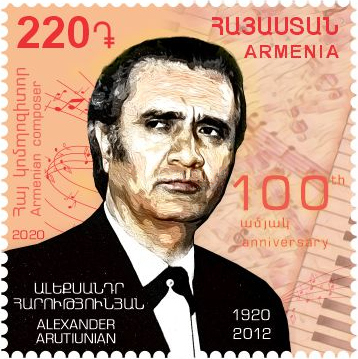
Arutiunian on a 2020 stamp of Armenia

- 1949 – Stalin Prize
- 1962 – People's Artist of the Armenian SSR
- 1970 – People's Artist of the USSR
- 1973 – State Prize of Armenian SSR
- 1977 – All-Union Alexandrov Prize (gold medal)
- 1983 – Orpheus Award (USA)
- 1986 – Aram Khachaturian Prize
- 1998 – Movses Khorenatsi medal
- 2001 – Order of St. Mesrop Mashtots
- 2004 – St Sahak and St Mesrop Order (Etchmiadzin, Armenia)
- 2005 – Armenian Academy of Sciences Gold Medal
- 1983 – Honorary Citizen of the State of Kentucky, USA
- 1987 – Honorary Citizen of Yerevan City.

== Works ==
Important works include:

- 1941 Impromptu for Cello and Piano
- 1946 Polyphonic Sonata in 3 movements;
- 1948 Cantata about the Motherland for soloist, choir and symphony orchestra in 5 movements (words by Ashot Grashi and Sarmen);
- 1949 Festive Overture for symphony orchestra;
- 1950 Concerto in A♭ major for Trumpet and Orchestra (dedicated to Haykaz Mesiayan);
- 1950 Armenian Rhapsody (co-author: Arno Babajanian)
- 1951 Concertino for piano and symphony orchestra in 3 movements (dedicated to Arutiunian's daughter, Narine)
- 1952 Armenian Dances for symphony orchestra in 5 movements
- 1955 Concert Scherzo for trumpet and symphony orchestra
- 1957 Symphony in 4 movements (dedicated to Tamara Odenova, spouse and friend)
- 1957 Armenian Fantasy for pops band (co-author: Konstantin Orbelyan)
- 1960 A Legend about the Armenian People vocal-symphonic poem in 4 movements (words by Ashot Grashi)
- 1964 Concerto-Fantasy [5 Contrasts] for wind quintet and symphony orchestra
- 1966 Sinfonietta for string orchestra in 4 movements
- 1967 Sayat-Nova, opera in three acts, libretto: H.Khanjyan
- 1973 Theme with Variations for trumpet and symphony orchestra
- 1980 Concerto for flute and string orchestra in 2 movements; revised in 2009 with a new cadenza and dedicated to James Strauss
- 1983 Aria et Scherzo in 2 movements for trumpet and piano
- 1984 Armenian Sketches suite for brass quintet in 4 movements
- 1986 Sasuntsis' dance for string quartet and piano (arrangement)
- 1988 Concerto for violin and string orchestra in 4 movements (dedicated to Ruben Aharonyan)
- 1989 Dance for four trombones
- 1990 Rhapsody for trumpet and pops band
- 1991 Concerto for trombone and symphony orchestra in 3 movements (dedicated to Michel Becquet)
- 1992 Concerto for tuba and symphony orchestra in 3 movements (dedicated to Roger Bobo)
- 1998 Suite for oboe, horn and piano in 3 movements
- 2004 Children's Album for piano

== Filmography ==
=== Music for films ===
- Urvakannere heranum en lernerits (Ghosts Leave the Peaks, 1955)
- Sirtn e yergum (The Heart Sings, 1957)
- "Im ynkeroj masin" (About My Friend, 1958)
- Za chas do rassveta (An Hour Before the Dawn, 1973, TV)
- Nahapet (1977) (as Life Triumphs in United States)
- Aleph, lectures contades (2000) Italian TV episode (soundtrack: "Concerto for trombone and orchestra")

=== As actor ===
- Lalvari vorskane (Lalvar Hunter, 1967) as Zako

== Bibliography ==
=== Autobiography ===
- Alexander Arutiunian Հուշեր [Memoirs]. Yerevan: Amrots, 2000 (Armenian)
- Alexander Arutiunian Воспоминания [Memoirs]. Yerevan: Amrots, 2000 (Russian)

=== Publications about Alexander Arutiunian ===
- Sergei Koptev, Ալեքսանդր Հարությունյան [Alexander Arutiunian]. Yerevan: Haypethrat, 1962. (Armenian)
- Izabella Eolyan, Александр Арутюнян [Alexander Arutiunian], Moscow: Sovetskii Kompozitor. 1962 (Russian)
- Mikhail Kokzhayev, Александр Арутюняна: Особенности композиторского стиля [Alexander Arutiunian: Features of the Composer's Style]. Moscow: Kompozitor, 2006 (Russian)
- Vyacheslav Yedigaryan, Фортепианное творчество Александра Арутюняна [Piano Works of Alexander Arutiunian]. Yerevan: Komitas, 2011. (Russian)
- Mikhail Kokzhayev, полифонии в музыке Александра Арутюняна [Polyphony in the Music of Alexander Arutiunian]. Yerevan: Komitas, 2012. (Russian)
- Alexander Arutiunian: What the photos tell, comp. R. Yesayan and ed. Narine Arutiunian. Yerevan: Komitas, 2014. (English/Russian/Armenian)
- Fred Sienkiewicz, Forefathers, antecedents, and the development of Alexander Arutiunian's ‘Big Soviet’ Armenian style. D.M.A. Dissertation, Boston University, 2019.

=== Dictionary articles ===
- Arutiunian, Alexander by Don Michael Randel, in 'The Harvard concise dictionary of music and musicians', 1999, 757 pages, p. 36
- Alexander Arutiunian in Great Soviet Encyclopedia
