= Sam's Song (song) =

"Sam's Song (The Happy Tune)"

Song
- Published: May 1, 1950
- Released: May 1950
- Genre: Traditional pop
- Composer: Lew Quadling
- Lyricist: Jack Elliott

"Sam's Song (The Happy Tune)" is an American pop song written in 1950 with music by Lew Quadling and lyrics by Jack Elliott. It was first released as a Capitol single by Joe "Fingers" Carr and the Carr-Hops in May 1950. By June of that year, Carr's single had made it to all three of Billboard's music popularity charts, and several other artists had released the song, including bandleaders Freddy Martin and Victor Young. Gary and Bing Crosby's release of the song in July 1950 was a hit, ranked as the 4th best selling record of 1950 according to Billboard. Dean Martin and Sammy Davis Jr. also released a recording of the song which hit the Billboard Hot 100 in 1962.

== Recording history ==
The first recording of the song, released in May 1950 by Joe "Fingers" Carr and the Carr-Hops, stayed on the Billboard charts for 13 weeks, peaking at #7 on the Jukebox chart and #8 on the Best Sellers chart.

On June 23, 1950, Bing Crosby's son Gary Crosby recorded the song for Decca with his father, along with "Play a Simple Melody" as the A-side, making his record debut at the age of 17. After its release in July, the Crosbys' recording stayed on the Billboard Best Sellers chart for 19 weeks, peaking at #3. It was also a hit on the Radio and Jukebox charts, peaking at #3 on both. The recording was also ranked #4 on Billboard's list of the top popular records of 1950 according to retail sales.

The next recording to chart was in 1962, when Dean Martin and Sammy Davis Jr. released the song as the B-side of a Reprise single, which peaked at #94 on the Hot 100. The A-side was Davis' duet with Frank Sinatra, "Me and My Shadow," and both tracks include banter between the singers and comical changes to the lyrics. Their recording of "Sam's Song" stayed on the Hot 100 for three weeks.
