= Lou Busch =

American songwriter (1910–79)

- Lou Busch

Background information
- Also known as: Joe "Fingers" Carr
- Born: Louis Ferdinand Bush; July 18, 1910
- Origin: Louisville, Kentucky, U.S.
- Died: September 19, 1979 (aged 69) Camarillo, California
- Genres: Jazz, ragtime
- Occupations: Musician, songwriter, producer
- Instrument: Piano
- Years active: 1930–1979
- Labels: Capitol, Warner Bros.

Lou Busch (né Louis Ferdinand Bush; July 18, 1910 – September 19, 1979) was an American record producer, musician and songwriter, best known for performing, as a pianist under the pseudonym Joe "Fingers" Carr.

== Biography ==
Busch (né Bush) was born and raised in Louisville, Kentucky during the ragtime and early jazz age. He quickly showed an aptitude for music, and by age 12 was already leading a ragtime and jazz band, Lou Bush and His Tickle Toe Four.

At 16, he left school and home for a career as a professional musician, playing with the likes of Henry Busse, Clyde McCoy, and George Olsen. After a few years on the road, his desire to learn more about music theory led him to study at the Cincinnati Music Conservatory in Ohio in the early 1930s.

Following his musical-education break, Busch became the pianist for Hal Kemp's "sweet music" band for the remainder of the 1930s. He also honed his arranging skills, and was offered an arranging position when arranger John Scott Trotter left the band in 1936. He shared the position with another key arranger, Hal Mooney; it was invaluable experience for them both. After Kemp died in a car crash in 1940 and the group disbanded, Busch and Mooney made their way to California to work as studio musicians and on whatever other gigs they could find. This was interrupted by World War II, when Busch spent three years in the Army.

=== Capitol Records ===
After his tour of duty, Busch returned to the music business. It was around this time that singer-songwriter Johnny Mercer was recruiting artists and employees for his recently formed label, Capitol Records, and Busch was hired for the radio transcription service in 1946. He was in charge of production of promotional radio shows featuring Capitol artists for distribution to stations around the country. By 1949 he had been promoted to A&R man.

One summer, Busch played piano for singer Jo Stafford and conductor Paul Weston on the hit record "Ragtime Cowboy Joe". The success encouraged both him and the label to release his own original single, "Ivory Rag", early in 1950. It was the first piece incorporated into the "Crazy Otto Medley" by German pianist Fritz Schulz-Reichel, which was later associated with Johnny Maddox in the U.S. In 1962, he formed Burning Bush Music ASCAP.

His biggest hits from the 1950s include "Portuguese Washerwomen", "Sam's Song", a cover of Del Wood's version of "Down Yonder", and Bert Kaempfert's international hit "Zambesi". Some of the singles include his vocal backup group, the Carr Hops. Often overlooked are several mainstream and jazz sides he recorded as Lou Busch, featuring exciting band or orchestral arrangements.

=== Warner Bros. Records ===
Busch eventually left Capitol for Warner Bros. Records where he took on the same general responsibilities. Busch returned to arranging and conducting responsibilities again, one of the most notable being the musical force behind comic singer Allan Sherman. On the Sherman records he was credited as "Lou Busch," musical director. Sherman explained Busch's choice to change the spelling of his surname: “Lou thought it would look fancier with a ‘c’ in it.” A few later albums were released on the Dot label, and in the late 1970s he produced one more effort with friend and jazz pianist Lincoln Mayorga, complete with a couple of new tunes, The Brinkerhoff Piano Company.

=== Marriages ===
He married actress and singer Janet Blair in 1943; the union ended in divorce in 1950. He wed singer Margaret Whiting in 1950, and their daughter was born in December 1950. That union also ended in divorce, in 1953.

=== Death ===
In the late 1970s, Busch did some live performances with Mayorga and others in Southern California. He died in Camarillo, California, on September 19, 1979, as a result of injuries sustained in an automobile crash. He was 69 years old. He was interred in the Westwood Village Mortuary near UCLA.

== Albums ==
| Album | Record label |
|---|---|
| Parlor Piano | Capitol T-698 |
| Bar Room Piano | Capitol |
| Rough House Piano | Capitol |
| And His Ragtime Band | Capitol |
| And His Swingin' String Band [1958] | Capitol ST-1217 |
| Plays the Classics | Capitol |
| Mr. Ragtime | Capitol |
| Fireman's Ball | Capitol T-527 |
| Honky Tonk Street Parade | Capitol |
| The Hits of Joe "Fingers" Carr | Capitol |
| Joe “Fingers” Carr Goes Continental | Capitol |
| The World's Greatest Ragtime Piano Player | Warner Bros. |
| Brassy Piano | Warner Bros. |
| The Riotous, Raucous Red-Hot 20s | Warner Bros. |
| Together for the Last Time with Ira Ironstrings (Alvino Rey) | Warner Bros. |
