= Teresa Brewer discography =

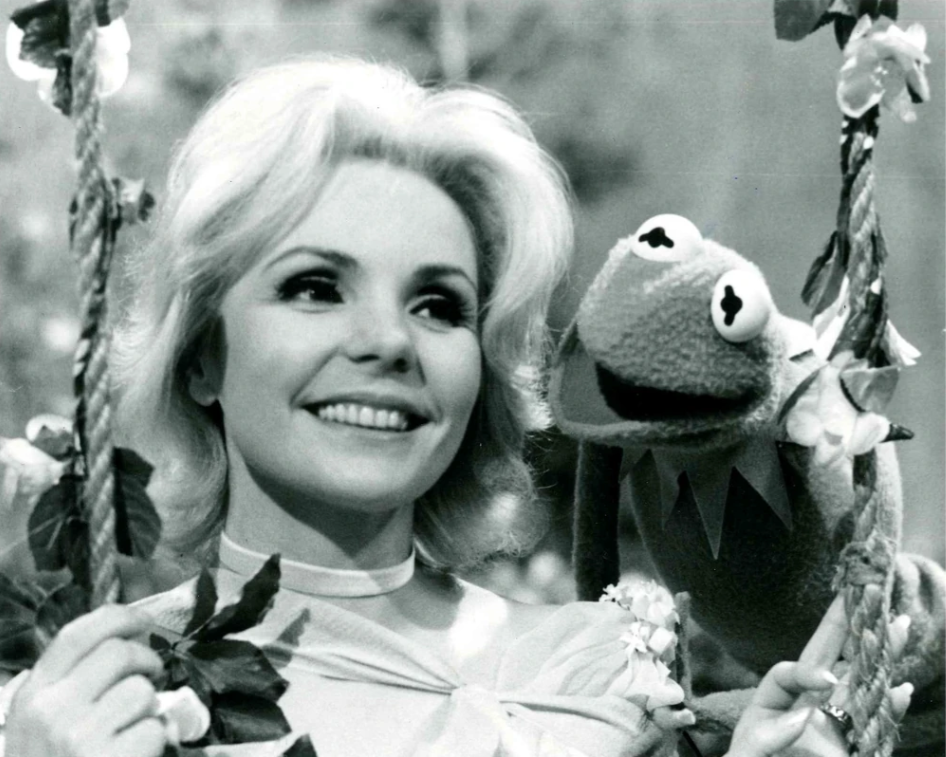
- Teresa Brewer on the Muppet Show in 1977
- Studio albums: 42
- Live albums: 3
- Compilation albums: 13+
- Singles: 89
- Other charted songs: 6
- Box sets: 1

This is the discography of American singer Teresa Brewer. It contains 40 studio albums, multiple compilation albums, 89 singles and other charted songs. Her debut single was 1949's "Copper Canyon", which saw moderate success. It was followed by her single "Music! Music! Music!", which topped the American charts and brought her to national stardom. The next single "Choo'n Gum" reached the charts as well.

Brewer's second No. 1 came in 1952 with "Till I Waltz Again with You". It was followed by her first album projects. "Into Each Life Some Rain Must Fall" spawned the LP Time for Teresa and her No. 2 hit in 1953 "Ricochet" was included in her LP Teresa. "You Send Me" was Brewer's final top-10 pop hit released in late 1957. During this time Coral Records issued more of her LPs, such as Miss Music, For Teenagers in Love and Music, Music, Music. None of the albums would reach the charts.

In 1960, she recorded her final top-40 hit titled "Anymore". It notably became her biggest Canadian success, reaching No. 3 nationwide. Her next singles, "Older and Wiser" and "Milord" would barely scrape the charts. She actively recorded through the rest of the 1960s, reaching the singles charts with two singles in 1963. In 1965 and 1967, she recorded songs from Broadway musicals Mary Poppins and How Now, Dow Jones. Her final career chart entry was a rock remake of her original hit "Music! Music! Music!" in 1973. It made brief chart appearances in the US and Canada. Brewer would continue recording up until her husband died in 1996, exploring vocal jazz and recording with such jazz musicians, including Count Basie, Duke Ellington, Dizzy Gillespie, Earl Hines, Svend Asmussen, and Bobby Hackett.

== Albums ==
=== Studio albums ===
List of studio albums, showing all relevant details
Title	Album details
Teresa Brewer	Released: 1951; Label: London; Formats: 10-inch album
'Till I Waltz Again With You	Released: 1953; Label: Coral; Formats: 10-inch album
A Bouquet of Hits	Released: 1954; Label: Coral; Formats: 10-inch album
Music, Music, Music	Released: 1955; Label: Coral; Formats: LP
Teresa	Released: 1956; Label: Coral; Formats: LP
Miss Hitmaker	Released: 1957; Label: Coral; Formats: LP
For Teenagers In Love	Released: 1957; Label: Coral; Formats: LP
Miss Music	Released: 1957; Label: Coral; Formats: LP
At Christmas Time	Released: 1957; Label: Coral; Formats: LP
Time for Teresa	Released: 1958; Label: Coral; Formats: LP
Teresa Brewer and the Dixieland Band	Released: 1959; Label: Coral; Formats: LP
When Your Lover Has Gone	Released: 1959; Label: Coral; Formats: LP
Heavenly Lover	Released: 1959; Label: Coral; Formats: LP
Ridin' High	Released: 1960; Label: Coral; Formats: LP
Naughty, Naughty, Naughty	Released: 1960; Label: Coral; Formats: LP
Songs Everybody Knows	Released: 1961; Label: Coral; Formats: LP
Aloha from Teresa	Released: 1961; Label: Coral; Formats: LP
Heavenly Lover	Released: 1961; Label: Coral; Formats: LP
Don't Mess with Tess	Released: 1962; Label: Coral; Formats: LP
Terrific Teresa Brewer!	Released: 1963; Label: Philips; Formats: LP
Golden Hits of 1964	Released: 1964; Label: Philips; Formats: LP
Moments to Remember	Released: 1964; Label: Philips; Formats: LP
Goldfinger, Dear Heart and Other Great Movie Songs	Released: 1965; Label: Philips; Formats: LP
Songs for Our Fighting Men	Released: 1966; Label: Philips; Formats: LP
Gold Country	Released: 1966; Label: Philips; Formats: LP
Texas Leather and Mexican Lace	Released: 1967; Label: Philips; Formats: LP
Singin' a Doo Dah Song	Released: 1972; Label: Flying Dutchman; Formats: LP
Count Basie / Teresa Brewer – The Songs of Bessie Smith	Released: 1973; Label: Flying Dutchman; Formats: LP
Music, Music, Music	Released: 1973; Label: Flying Dutchman; Formats: LP
Teresa Brewer & the World's Greatest Jazzband of Yank Lawson and Bob Haggart – Good News	Released: 1973; Label: RCA; Formats: LP
Here's Teresa Brewer	Released: 1973; Label: Vocalion; Formats: LP
Duke Ellington & Teresa Brewer – It Don't Mean a Thing If It Ain't Got That Swing	Released: 1974; Label: Flying Dutchman; Formats: Cassette, CD
Unliberated Woman	Released: 1975; Label: Signature; Formats: Cassette, CD
Teresa Brewer, Stephane Grappelli – On the Road Again	Released: 1983; Label: Doctor Jazz; Formats: Cassette, CD
I Dig Big Band Singers	Released: 1983; Label: Doctor Jazz; Formats: Cassette, CD
Midnight Cafe (A Few More for the Road)	Released: 1986; Label: Doctor Jazz; Formats: Cassette, CD
All of Me	Released: 1986; Label: CBS Special Products; Formats: Cassette
Teresa Brewer & Svend Asmussen – On the Good Ship Lollipop	Released: 1987; Label: Doctor Jazz; Formats: Cassette, CD
Teresa Brewer & Mercer Ellington – The Cotton Connection	Released: 1987; Label: Doctor Jazz; Formats: LP
Memories Of Louis	Released: 1991; Label: Red Baron; Formats: Cassette, CD
Softly I Swing	Released: 1992; Label: Red Baron; Formats: Cassette, CD
American Music Box Vol. 1 – The Songs of Irving Berlin	Released: 1987; Label: Doctor Jazz; Formats: Cassette, CD
American Music Box Vol. 2: The Songs Of Harry Warren	Released: 1993; Label: Doctor Jazz; Formats: Cassette, CD

=== Compilation albums ===
Title	Album details
My Golden Favorites	Released: 1960; Label: Coral; Formats: LP
Teresa Brewer's Greatest Hits	Released: 1962; Label: Philips; Formats: LP
The Best of Teresa Brewer	Released: 1962; Label: Coral; Formats: LP
Greatest Hits	Released: 1975; Label: RCA Victor; Formats: LP
World of Teresa Brewer	Released: 1976; Label: London; Formats: LP
Remember Teresa Brewer	Released: 1977; Label: Fontana; Formats: LP
Spotlight on Teresa Brewer	Released: 1978; Label: Phillips; Formats: LP
Brewer's Best	Released: 1981; Label: Phillips; Formats: CD
Golden Greats	Released: 1985; Label: MCA; Formats: CD
Portrait	Released: 1986; Label: RCA; Formats: CD
Golden Hits	Released: 1988; Label: Pickwick; Formats: CD
16 Most Requested Songs	Released: 1991; Label: Columbia; Formats: CD
The Very Best of Teresa Brewer	Released: 1993; Label: Sound Waves; Formats: CD
Music! Music! Music!: The Best of Teresa Brewer	Released: 1995; Label: Verese Sarabande; Formats: CD

=== Live albums ===
Title	Album details
Teresa Brewer with Oily Rags – In London	Released: 1973; Label: Flying Dutchman; Formats: LP
Teresa Brewer in London	Released: 1984; Label: Signature; Formats: Cassette, CD
Live at Carnegie Hall and Montreux	Released: 1984; Label: Doctor Jazz; Formats: Cassette, CD

== Singles ==
=== 1940s and 50s ===
List of singles, with selected chart positions, showing other relevant details
Single (A-side, B-side) Both sides from same album except where indicated Some tracks from 10-inch LP's did not appear on any standard albums	Year	Chart positions			Album
Single (A-side, B-side) Both sides from same album except where indicated Some tracks from 10-inch LP's did not appear on any standard albums	Year	US	CB	UK	Album
"Copper Canyon" b/w "Way Back Home" Teresa Brewer & Bobby Wayne	1949	—	25	—	Non-album tracks
"Music! Music! Music!" b/w "Copenhagen"	1950	1	1	—	Music Music Music (Coral)
"Choo'n Gum" b/w "Honky Tonkin'"	1950	17	11	—	Non-album tracks
"Punky Punkin'" b/w "Cincinnati Dancing Pig"	1950	—	—	—	Non-album tracks
"Molasses Molasses" b/w "Grizzly Bear"	1950	—	—	—	Non-album tracks
"The Thing" b/w "I Guess I'll Have to Dream the Rest"	1950	—	—	—	Non-album tracks
"Let's Have a Party" / "The Picnic Song" Teresa Brewer, Claire Hogan, Snooky Lanson & Bobby Wayne	1951	—	—	—	Non-album tracks
"A Penny a Kiss, A Penny a Hug" b/w "Hello" Teresa Brewer & Snooky Lanson	1951	—	—	—	Non-album tracks
"If You Want Some Lovin'" b/w "I've Got the Craziest Feeling"	1951	—	—	—	Non-album tracks
"Lonesome Gal" b/w "Counterfeit Kisses"	1951	—	—	—	Non-album tracks
"Oceana Roll" b/w "Wang Wang Blues"	1951	—	—	—	Non-album tracks
"If You Don't Marry Me" /"I Wish I Wuz"	1951	—	—	—	Non-album tracks
"Longing for You" b/w "Jazz Me Blues"	1951	23	—	—	Non-album tracks
"Sing Sing Sing" b/w "I Don't Care"	1952	—	—	—	Till I Waltz Again with You (10-inch LP)
"Lovin' Machine" b/w "Noodlin' Rag" (on Teresa Brewer (Vocalion))	1952	—	—	—	Non-album track
"Gonna Get Along Without Ya Now" b/w "Roll Them Roly-Boly Eyes" (on Teresa Brewer (Vocalion))	1952	25	—	—	Till I Waltz Again with You (10-inch LP)
"I Hear the Bluebells" b/w "Kisses on Paper"	1952	—	—	—	Non-album tracks
"Rhode Island Redhead" Teresa Brewer b/w "En-Thus-E-Us-E-As-M" Eileen Barton (Non-album track)	1952	—	—	—	Teresa Brewer (Vocalion)
"You'll Never Get Away" b/w "The Hookey Song" Don Cornell & Teresa Brewer	1952	17	17	—	Non-album tracks
"Till I Waltz Again with You" b/w "Hello Bluebird"	1952	1	1	—	Till I Waltz Again with You (10-inch LP)
"Dancin' with Someone (Longin' for You)" b/w "Breakin' in the Blues"	1953	17	20	—	Till I Waltz Again with You (10-inch LP)
"Into Each Life Some Rain Must Fall" b/w "Too Much Mustard"	1953	23	—	—	Time for Teresa
"Ricochet (Rick-O-Shay)"	1953	2	2	—	Teresa
"Too Young to Tango"	1953	—	39	—	The Best of Teresa Brewer
"Baby, Baby, Baby" b/w "I Guess It Was You All the Time"	1953	12	20	—	Non-album tracks
"Bell Bottom Blues" /	1953	17	14	—	Teresa
"Our Heartbreaking Waltz"	1953	23	30	—	Non-album tracks
"I Saw Mommy Kissing Santa Claus" b/w "Ebenezer Scrooge"	1953	—	—	—	Non-album tracks
"I Just Can't Wait Till Christmas" b/w "Too Fat for the Chimney"	1953	—	—	—	Non-album tracks
"Jilted" b/w "Le Grand Tour de L'Amour" (from Teresa Brewer)	1954	6	11	—	Miss Music
"Skinnie Minnie (Fish Tail)" b/w "I Had Someone Else Before I Had You" (from A Bouquet of Hits, 10-inch LP)	1954	22	26	—	Miss Music
"Au Revoir" b/w "Danger Signs"	1954	—	31	—	Miss Music
"Time" b/w "My Sweetie Went Away" (from A Bouquet of Hits, 10-inch LP)	1954	—	43	—	Non-album tracks
"Let Me Go, Lover" b/w "The Moon Is On Fire" (Non-album track)	1954	6	—	9	Teresa
"I Gotta Go Get My Baby" b/w "What More Is There to Say" (Non-album track)	1955	—	21	—	Teresa
"Pledging My Love" /	1955	17	11	—	Teresa
"How Important Can It Be?"	1955	Flip	—	—	Non-album tracks
"Tweedle Dee" b/w "Rock Love" (from Miss Music)	1955	—	—	—	Non-album tracks
"Silver Dollar" b/w "I Don't Want to Be Lonely Tonight" (from Teresa Brewer)	1955	20	27	—	Teresa
"The Banjo's Back in Town" b/w "How to Be Very, Very Popular" (Non-album track)	1955	15	24	—	Teresa
"Baby Be My Toy" b/w "So Doggone Lonely" (Non-album track)	1955	—	—	—	Miss Music
"Shoot It Again" b/w "You're Telling Our Secrets" (from Teresa Brewer)	1955	66	39	—	Non-album track
"A Good Man Is Hard to Find" b/w "It's Siesta Time" (from Teresa Brewer)	1956	—	39	—	Music Music Music (Coral)
"A Tear Fell" /	1956	5	7	2	Teresa
"Bo Weevil"	1956	17	19	—	Teresa
"A Sweet Old Fashioned Girl" b/w "Goodbye, John"	1956	7	11	3	Teresa
"I Love Mickey" (with Mickey Mantle) b/w "Keep Your Cotton Pickin' Paddies Offa My Heart" (from Teresa Brewer)	1956	87	50	—	Miss Music
"Mutual Admiration Society" /	1956	21	24	—	Miss Music
"Crazy with Love"	1956	73	—	—	Miss Music
"I'm Drowning My Sorrows" /	1957	—	40	—	Non-album track
"How Lonely Can One Be"	1957	—	49	—	Miss Music
"Empty Arms" b/w "The Ricky-Tick Song" (from For Teenagers in Love)	1957	13	17	—	Miss Music
"Teardrops in My Heart" b/w "Lula Rock-a-Hula" (Note: Teardrops in My Heart peaked at number 13 on the Canadian CHUM Chart.)	1957	64	40	—	For Teenagers in Love
"It's the Same Old Jazz" b/w "Born to Love"	1957	—	—	—	For Teenagers in Love
"You Send Me" b/w "Would I Were"	1957	8	1	—	Time for Teresa
"Nora Malone" b/w "When I Leave the World Behind"	1957	—	—	26	Music Music Music (Coral)
"Listen My Children" b/w "Hush-a-Bye, Wink-a-Bye"	1957	—	—	—	At Christmas Time
"Lost a Little Puppy" b/w "Because Him Is a Baby"	1958	—	—	—	At Christmas Time
"Whirlpool" b/w "There's Nothing as Lonesome as Saturday Night"	1958	—	—	—	Teresa Brewer
"Saturday Dance" b/w "I Think the World of You" (from Time for Teresa)	1958	—	—	—	Heavenly Lover
"Pickle Up a Doodle" b/w "The Rain Falls on Everybody"	1958	99	—	—	Heavenly Lover
"The Hula Hoop Song" b/w "So Shy" (from For Teenagers in Love)	1958	38	37	—	Heavenly Lover
"Jingle Bell Rock" b/w "I Like Christmas" (Non-album track)	1958	—	—	—	The Best of Teresa Brewer
"The One Rose (That's Left in My Heart)" b/w "Satellite"	1959	75	67	—	Heavenly Lover
"Heavenly Lover" b/w "Fair Weather Sweetheart"	1959	40	44	—	Heavenly Lover
"Bye Bye Bye Baby Goodbye" b/w "Chain of Friendship"	1959	115	99	—	Heavenly Lover
"Mexicali Rose" b/w "If You Like-a-Me" (Non-album track)	1959	—	—	—	Songs Everybody Knows

=== 1960s and 70s ===
List of singles, with selected chart positions, showing other relevant details
Single (A-side, B-side) Both sides from same album except where indicated Some tracks from 10-inch LP's did not appear on any standard albums	Year	Chart positions				Album
Single (A-side, B-side) Both sides from same album except where indicated Some tracks from 10-inch LP's did not appear on any standard albums	Year	US	CB	CAN	UK	Album
"Peace of Mind" b/w "Venetian Sunset" (Non-album track)	1960	66	81	—	—	My Golden Favorites
"Anymore" b/w "That Piano Man" (Non-album track)	1960	31	24	3	—	Songs Everybody Knows
"Have You Ever Been Lonely (Have You Ever Been Blue)" b/w "When Do You Love Me"	1960	84	120	—	—	Songs Everybody Knows
"How Do You Know It's Love" b/w "If There Are Stars in My Eyes"	1960	—	—	—	21	Non-album tracks
"Older and Wiser" /	1961	—	136	—	—	Non-album tracks
"Whip-poor-will"	1961	—	131	—	—	Non-album tracks
"Milord" b/w "I've Got My Fingers Crossed"	1961	74	105	—	—	The Best of Teresa Brewer
"Little Miss Belong to No One" b/w "Sea Shell" (from Aloha from Teresa)	1961	—	111	—	—	Non-album tracks
"Step Right Up" b/w "Pretty Lookin' Boy"	1961	—	—	—	—	Non-album tracks
"Another" b/w "I Want You to Worry"	1962	—	—	—	—	Non-album tracks
"One Heart Less to Break" b/w "You Came a Long Way from St. Louis" (from Don't Mess with Tess)	1962	—	—	—	—	Non-album tracks
"The Ballad of Lover's Hill" b/w "Not Like a Sister" (from Terrific Teresa Brewer)	1962	—	118	—	—	Non-album track
"She'll Never, Never Love You (Like I Do)" b/w "The Thrill Is Gone"	1963	122	113	—	—	Terrific Teresa Brewer
"Second Hand Rose" b/w "Stand-In"	1963	—	—	—	—	Terrific Teresa Brewer
"He Understands Me" b/w "Just Before We Say Goodbye" (Non-album track)	1963	130	145	—	—	Terrific Teresa Brewer
"I Hear the Angels Singing" b/w "Cry Baby"	1964	—	—	—	—	Non-album tracks
"Come On In" b/w "Simple Things"	1964	—	—	—	—	Non-album tracks
"Dang Me" b/w "Mama Never Told Me" (Non-album track)	1964	—	—	—	—	Golden Hits of 1964
"Goldfinger" b/w "Make Room for One More Fool" (Non-album track)	1965	—	—	—	—	Goldfinger, Dear Heart & Other Great Movie Songs
"Supercalifragilisticexpialidocious" b/w "I've Grown Accustomed to His Face"	1965	—	—	—	—	Goldfinger, Dear Heart & Other Great Movie Songs
"What About Mine" b/w "Say Something Sweet to Your Sweetheart"	1965	—	—	—	—	Non-album tracks
"Little Buddy" b/w "Little Bitty Grain of Sand" (Non-album track)	1965	—	—	—	—	Songs for Our Fighting Men
"Handle with Care" b/w "I Can't Remember (Ever Loving You)"	1966	—	—	—	—	Non-album tracks
"Evil on Your Mind" b/w "Ain't Had No Lovin'"	1966	—	—	—	—	Gold Country
"Thoroughly Modern Millie" b/w "Jimmy"	1967	—	—	—	—	Non-album tracks
"Step to the Rear" b/w "Live a Little"	1968	—	—	—	—	Non-album tracks
"A Woman's World" b/w "Ride-a-Roo"	1968	—	—	—	—	Non-album tracks
"Somewhere There's Someone Who Loves You" b/w "Day by Day"	1972	—	—	—	—	Non-album tracks
"A Simple Song" b/w "Singin' a Doo Dah Song"	1973	—	—	—	—	Singin' a Doo Dah Song
"Music! Music! Music!" (rock version) b/w "School Days"	1973	109	112	84	—	Teresa Brewer in London
"Another Useless Day" b/w "Music To The Man"	1973	—	—	—	—	Music Music Music (Flying Dutchman)
"Bo Weevil" b/w "Bei Mir Bist Du Schon (Means That You're Grand)" (from Music Music Music (Flying Dutchman))	1974	—	—	—	—	Non-album tracks
"Gatsby's" b/w "What'll I Do"	1974	—	—	—	—	Non-album tracks
"Am I Asking Too Much of You" b/w "Willie Burgundy"	1974	—	—	—	—	Non-album tracks
"Unliberated Woman" b/w "Good Lovin' You"	1975	—	—	—	—	Unliberated Woman
"Music Music Music" (Disco Version) b/w "Where Did the Good Times Go"	1976	—	—	—	—	Non-album tracks
"Some Songs" b/w "A Natural Feelin' for You"	1979	—	—	—	—	Non-album tracks
"Come Follow the Band" b/w "The Colors of My Life"	1981	—	—	—	—	Come Follow the Band
"Jimmy Dorsey Medley" b/w "Classic Medley #1"	1983	—	—	—	—	Non-album tracks
"No Way Conway" b/w "Sittin' Here Cryin'"	1983	—	—	—	—	Non-album tracks
