= List of Cash Box Best Sellers number-one singles of 1950 =

These are the songs that reached number one on the Top 40 Best Sellers chart in 1950 as published by Cash Box magazine. Artists were not specified in the charts of this time period so songs may represent more than one version. The artist who most popularized each song is listed.

Issue date	Song	Artist
January 7	"I Can Dream, Can't I?"	The Andrews Sisters
January 14	"I Can Dream, Can't I?"	The Andrews Sisters
January 21	"I Can Dream, Can't I?"	The Andrews Sisters
January 28	"I Can Dream, Can't I?"	The Andrews Sisters
February 4	"I Can Dream, Can't I?"	The Andrews Sisters
February 11	"I Can Dream, Can't I?"	The Andrews Sisters
February 18	"Dear Hearts and Gentle People"	Bing Crosby
February 25	"Chattanoogie Shoe Shine Boy"	Red Foley
March 4	"Chattanoogie Shoe Shine Boy"	Red Foley
March 11	"Chattanoogie Shoe Shine Boy"	Red Foley
March 18	"Chattanoogie Shoe Shine Boy"	Red Foley
March 25	"Music! Music! Music!"	Teresa Brewer
April 1	"Music! Music! Music!"	Teresa Brewer
April 8	"Music! Music! Music!"	Teresa Brewer
April 15	"Music! Music! Music!"	Teresa Brewer
April 22	"The Third Man Theme"	Anton Karas
April 29	"The Third Man Theme"	Anton Karas
May 6	"The Third Man Theme"	Anton Karas
May 13	"The Third Man Theme"	Anton Karas
May 20	"The Third Man Theme"	Anton Karas
May 27	"The Third Man Theme"	Anton Karas
June 3	"The Third Man Theme"	Anton Karas
June 10	"The Third Man Theme"	Anton Karas
June 17	"The Third Man Theme"	Anton Karas
June 24	"The Third Man Theme"	Anton Karas
July 1	"The Third Man Theme"	Anton Karas
July 8	"Bewitched, Bothered and Bewildered"	Vivienne Segal
July 15	"Bewitched, Bothered and Bewildered"	Vivienne Segal
July 22	"Bewitched, Bothered and Bewildered"	Vivienne Segal
July 29	"Bewitched, Bothered and Bewildered"	Vivienne Segal
August 5	"Mona Lisa"	Nat King Cole
August 12	"Mona Lisa"	Nat King Cole
August 19	"Mona Lisa"	Nat King Cole
August 26	"Mona Lisa"	Nat King Cole
September 2	"Goodnight, Irene"	Gordon Jenkins and The Weavers
September 9	"Goodnight, Irene"	Gordon Jenkins and The Weavers
September 16	"Goodnight, Irene"	Gordon Jenkins and The Weavers
September 23	"Goodnight, Irene"	Gordon Jenkins and The Weavers
September 30	"Goodnight, Irene"	Gordon Jenkins and The Weavers
October 7	"Goodnight, Irene"	Gordon Jenkins and The Weavers
October 14	"Goodnight, Irene"	Gordon Jenkins and The Weavers
October 21	"Goodnight, Irene"	Gordon Jenkins and The Weavers
October 28	"Goodnight, Irene"	Gordon Jenkins and The Weavers
November 4	"Goodnight, Irene"	Gordon Jenkins and The Weavers
November 11	"Harbor Lights"	Sammy Kaye
November 18	"Harbor Lights"	Sammy Kaye
November 25	"Harbor Lights"	Sammy Kaye
December 2	"Harbor Lights"	Sammy Kaye
December 9	"Harbor Lights"	Sammy Kaye
December 16	"The Thing"	Phil Harris
December 23	"Harbor Lights"	Sammy Kaye
December 30	"Tennessee Waltz"	Patti Page

== See also ==
- 1950 in music
- List of number-one singles of 1950 (U.S.)
