= Bell Bottom Blues =

"Bell Bottom Blues" may refer to:

- "Bell Bottom Blues" (Carr/David song), 1953 song popularized by Teresa Brewer in the United States and Alma Cogan in the United Kingdom
- "Bell Bottom Blues" (Derek and the Dominos song), 1970 song written by Eric Clapton and Bobby Whitlock, and popularized by his band Derek and the Dominos
