= List of Billboard number-one singles of 1950 =

This is a list of number-one songs in the United States during the year 1950 according to Billboard magazine. Prior to the creation of the Billboard Hot 100, Billboard published multiple singles charts each week. In 1950, the following four charts were produced:

- Best Sellers in Stores – ranked the biggest selling singles in retail stores, as reported by merchants surveyed throughout the country.
- Most Played by Jockeys – ranked the most played songs on United States radio stations, as reported by radio disc jockeys and radio stations.
- Most Played in Jukeboxes – ranked the most played songs in jukeboxes across the United States.
- Honor Roll of Hits – a composite ten-position song chart which combined data from the three charts above along with three other component charts. It served as The Billboard's lead chart until the introduction of the Hot 100 in 1958 and would remain in print until 1963.

Issue date	Best Sellers in Stores	Most Played by Jockeys	Most Played in Jukeboxes	Honor Roll of Hits	Ref.
January 7	"Rudolph, the Red-Nosed Reindeer"; Gene Autry and The Pinafores	"I Can Dream, Can't I?"; Andrews Sisters with Gordon Jenkins and His Orchestra	"Mule Train"; Frankie Laine and the Muleskinners	"Mule Train"	
January 14	"I Can Dream, Can't I?"; Andrews Sisters with Gordon Jenkins and His Orchestra	"I Can Dream, Can't I?"; Andrews Sisters with Gordon Jenkins and His Orchestra	"Mule Train"; Frankie Laine and the Muleskinners	"I Can Dream, Can't I?"	
January 21	"I Can Dream, Can't I?"; Andrews Sisters with Gordon Jenkins and His Orchestra	"I Can Dream, Can't I?"; Andrews Sisters with Gordon Jenkins and His Orchestra	"I Can Dream, Can't I?"; Andrews Sisters with Gordon Jenkins and His Orchestra	"I Can Dream, Can't I?"	
January 28	"I Can Dream, Can't I?"; Andrews Sisters with Gordon Jenkins and His Orchestra	"I Can Dream, Can't I?"; Andrews Sisters with Gordon Jenkins and His Orchestra	"I Can Dream, Can't I?"; Andrews Sisters with Gordon Jenkins and His Orchestra	"Dear Hearts and Gentle People"	
February 4	"I Can Dream, Can't I?"; Andrews Sisters with Gordon Jenkins and His Orchestra	"I Can Dream, Can't I?"; Andrews Sisters with Gordon Jenkins and His Orchestra	"I Can Dream, Can't I?"; Andrews Sisters with Gordon Jenkins and His Orchestra	"Dear Hearts and Gentle People"	
February 11	"Rag Mop"; Ames Brothers with Orchestra directed by Roy Ross	"Rag Mop"; Ames Brothers with Orchestra directed by Roy Ross	"Chattanoogie Shoe Shine Boy"; Red Foley	"Dear Hearts and Gentle People"	
February 18	"Chattanoogie Shoe Shine Boy"; Red Foley	"Rag Mop"; Ames Brothers with Orchestra directed by Roy Ross	"Chattanoogie Shoe Shine Boy"; Red Foley	"Chattanoogie Shoe Shine Boy"	
February 25	"Chattanoogie Shoe Shine Boy"; Red Foley	"Chattanoogie Shoe Shine Boy"; Red Foley	"Chattanoogie Shoe Shine Boy"; Red Foley	"Chattanoogie Shoe Shine Boy"	
March 4	"Chattanoogie Shoe Shine Boy"; Red Foley	"Chattanoogie Shoe Shine Boy"; Red Foley	"Chattanoogie Shoe Shine Boy"; Red Foley	"Chattanoogie Shoe Shine Boy"	
March 11	"Chattanoogie Shoe Shine Boy"; Red Foley	"The Cry of the Wild Goose"; Frankie Laine with Harry Geller and His Orchestra and Carl Fischer	"Chattanoogie Shoe Shine Boy"; Red Foley	"Chattanoogie Shoe Shine Boy"	
March 18	"Music! Music! Music!"; Teresa Brewer with the Dixieland All Stars (Jack Pleis, Ernie Caceres, Max Kaminsky, Cutty Cutshall, George Wettling, Eddie Safranski, and Danny Perri)	"The Cry of the Wild Goose"; Frankie Laine with Harry Geller and His Orchestra and Carl Fischer	"Chattanoogie Shoe Shine Boy"; Red Foley	"Chattanoogie Shoe Shine Boy"	
March 25	"Music! Music! Music!"; Teresa Brewer with the Dixieland All Stars (Jack Pleis, Ernie Caceres, Max Kaminsky, Cutty Cutshall, George Wettling, Eddie Safranski, and Danny Perri)	"If I Knew You Were Comin' I'd've Baked a Cake"; Eileen Barton with Orchestra and Chorus under the direction of Morty Craft	"Chattanoogie Shoe Shine Boy"; Red Foley	"Music! Music! Music!"	
April 1	"Music! Music! Music!"; Teresa Brewer with the Dixieland All Stars (Jack Pleis, Ernie Caceres, Max Kaminsky, Cutty Cutshall, George Wettling, Eddie Safranski, and Danny Perri)	"If I Knew You Were Comin' I'd've Baked a Cake"; Eileen Barton with Orchestra and Chorus under the direction of Morty Craft	"Chattanoogie Shoe Shine Boy"; Red Foley	"Music! Music! Music!"	
April 8	"Music! Music! Music!"; Teresa Brewer with the Dixieland All Stars (Jack Pleis, Ernie Caceres, Max Kaminsky, Cutty Cutshall, George Wettling, Eddie Safranski, and Danny Perri)	"If I Knew You Were Comin' I'd've Baked a Cake"; Eileen Barton with Orchestra and Chorus under the direction of Morty Craft	"Music! Music! Music!"; Teresa Brewer with the Dixieland All Stars (Jack Pleis, Ernie Caceres, Max Kaminsky, Cutty Cutshall, George Wettling, Eddie Safranski, and Danny Perri)	"Music! Music! Music!"	
April 15	"If I Knew You Were Comin' I'd've Baked a Cake"; Eileen Barton with Orchestra and Chorus under the direction of Morty Craft	"If I Knew You Were Comin' I'd've Baked a Cake"; Eileen Barton with Orchestra and Chorus under the direction of Morty Craft	"If I Knew You Were Comin' I'd've Baked a Cake"; Eileen Barton with Orchestra and Chorus under the direction of Morty Craft	"If I Knew You Were Coming I'd've Baked a Cake"	
April 22	"If I Knew You Were Comin' I'd've Baked a Cake"; Eileen Barton with Orchestra and Chorus under the direction of Morty Craft	"If I Knew You Were Comin' I'd've Baked a Cake"; Eileen Barton with Orchestra and Chorus under the direction of Morty Craft	"If I Knew You Were Comin' I'd've Baked a Cake"; Eileen Barton with Orchestra and Chorus under the direction of Morty Craft	"If I Knew You Were Coming I'd've Baked a Cake"	
April 29	"The Third Man Theme"; Anton Karas	"If I Knew You Were Comin' I'd've Baked a Cake"; Eileen Barton with Orchestra and Chorus under the direction of Morty Craft	"If I Knew You Were Comin' I'd've Baked a Cake"; Eileen Barton with Orchestra and Chorus under the direction of Morty Craft	"If I Knew You Were Coming I'd've Baked a Cake"	
May 6	"The Third Man Theme"; Anton Karas	"If I Knew You Were Comin' I'd've Baked a Cake"; Eileen Barton with Orchestra and Chorus under the direction of Morty Craft	"The 3rd Man Theme"; Guy Lombardo and His Royal Canadians with Don Rodney	"If I Knew You Were Coming I'd've Baked a Cake"	
May 13	"The Third Man Theme"; Anton Karas	"If I Knew You Were Comin' I'd've Baked a Cake"; Eileen Barton with Orchestra and Chorus under the direction of Morty Craft	"The 3rd Man Theme"; Guy Lombardo and His Royal Canadians with Don Rodney	"Third Man Theme, The"	
May 20	"The Third Man Theme"; Anton Karas	"If I Knew You Were Comin' I'd've Baked a Cake"; Eileen Barton with Orchestra and Chorus under the direction of Morty Craft	"The 3rd Man Theme"; Guy Lombardo and His Royal Canadians with Don Rodney	"Third Man Theme, The"	
May 27	"The Third Man Theme"; Anton Karas	"If I Knew You Were Comin' I'd've Baked a Cake"; Eileen Barton with Orchestra and Chorus under the direction of Morty Craft	"The 3rd Man Theme"; Guy Lombardo and His Royal Canadians with Don Rodney	"Third Man Theme, The"	
June 3	"The Third Man Theme"; Anton Karas	"Hoop-Dee-Doo"; Perry Como and The Fontane Sisters with Mitchell Ayres and his Orchestra	"The 3rd Man Theme"; Guy Lombardo and His Royal Canadians with Don Rodney	"Third Man Theme, The"	
June 10	"The Third Man Theme"; Anton Karas	"Sentimental Me"; Ames Brothers with Orchestra directed by Roy Ross	"The 3rd Man Theme"; Guy Lombardo and His Royal Canadians with Don Rodney	"Third Man Theme, The"	
June 17	"The Third Man Theme"; Anton Karas	"Hoop-Dee-Doo"; Perry Como and The Fontane Sisters with Mitchell Ayres and his Orchestra	"The 3rd Man Theme"; Guy Lombardo and His Royal Canadians with Don Rodney	"Third Man Theme, The"	
June 24	"The Third Man Theme"; Anton Karas	"I Wanna Be Loved"; Andrews Sisters with Gordon Jenkins and His Orchestra	"The 3rd Man Theme"; Guy Lombardo and His Royal Canadians with Don Rodney	"Third Man Theme, The"	
July 1	"The Third Man Theme"; Anton Karas	"I Wanna Be Loved"; Andrews Sisters with Gordon Jenkins and His Orchestra	"The 3rd Man Theme"; Guy Lombardo and His Royal Canadians with Don Rodney	"Bewitched"	
July 8	"The Third Man Theme"; Anton Karas	"Mona Lisa"; Nat "King" Cole with Orchestra conducted by Les Baxter	"The 3rd Man Theme"; Guy Lombardo and His Royal Canadians with Don Rodney	"Third Man Theme, The"	
July 15	"Mona Lisa"; Nat "King" Cole with Orchestra conducted by Les Baxter	"Mona Lisa"; Nat "King" Cole with Orchestra conducted by Les Baxter	"The 3rd Man Theme"; Guy Lombardo and His Royal Canadians with Don Rodney	"Bewitched"	
July 22	"Mona Lisa"; Nat "King" Cole with Orchestra conducted by Les Baxter	"Mona Lisa"; Nat "King" Cole with Orchestra conducted by Les Baxter	"Mona Lisa"; Nat "King" Cole with Orchestra conducted by Les Baxter	"Mona Lisa"	
July 29	"Mona Lisa"; Nat "King" Cole with Orchestra conducted by Les Baxter	"Mona Lisa"; Nat "King" Cole with Orchestra conducted by Les Baxter	"Mona Lisa"; Nat "King" Cole with Orchestra conducted by Les Baxter	"Mona Lisa"	
August 5	"Mona Lisa"; Nat "King" Cole with Orchestra conducted by Les Baxter	"Mona Lisa"; Nat "King" Cole with Orchestra conducted by Les Baxter	"Mona Lisa"; Nat "King" Cole with Orchestra conducted by Les Baxter	"Mona Lisa"	
August 12	"Mona Lisa"; Nat "King" Cole with Orchestra conducted by Les Baxter	"Mona Lisa"; Nat "King" Cole with Orchestra conducted by Les Baxter	"Mona Lisa"; Nat "King" Cole with Orchestra conducted by Les Baxter	"Mona Lisa"	
August 19	"Goodnight Irene"; Gordon Jenkins and His Orchestra and The Weavers	"Mona Lisa"; Nat "King" Cole with Orchestra conducted by Les Baxter	"Mona Lisa"; Nat "King" Cole with Orchestra conducted by Les Baxter	"Mona Lisa"	
August 26	"Goodnight Irene"; Gordon Jenkins and His Orchestra and The Weavers	"Mona Lisa"; Nat "King" Cole with Orchestra conducted by Les Baxter	"Goodnight Irene"; Gordon Jenkins and His Orchestra and The Weavers	"Goodnight, Irene"	
September 2	"Goodnight Irene"; Gordon Jenkins and His Orchestra and The Weavers	"Goodnight Irene"; Gordon Jenkins and His Orchestra and The Weavers	"Goodnight Irene"; Gordon Jenkins and His Orchestra and The Weavers	"Goodnight, Irene"	
September 9	"Goodnight Irene"; Gordon Jenkins and His Orchestra and The Weavers	"Goodnight Irene"; Gordon Jenkins and His Orchestra and The Weavers	"Goodnight Irene"; Gordon Jenkins and His Orchestra and The Weavers	"Goodnight, Irene"	
September 16	"Goodnight Irene"; Gordon Jenkins and His Orchestra and The Weavers	"Goodnight Irene"; Gordon Jenkins and His Orchestra and The Weavers	"Goodnight Irene"; Gordon Jenkins and His Orchestra and The Weavers	"Goodnight, Irene"	
September 23	"Goodnight Irene"; Gordon Jenkins and His Orchestra and The Weavers	"Goodnight Irene"; Gordon Jenkins and His Orchestra and The Weavers	"Goodnight Irene"; Gordon Jenkins and His Orchestra and The Weavers	"Goodnight, Irene"	
September 30	"Goodnight Irene"; Gordon Jenkins and His Orchestra and The Weavers	"Goodnight Irene"; Gordon Jenkins and His Orchestra and The Weavers	"Goodnight Irene"; Gordon Jenkins and His Orchestra and The Weavers	"Goodnight, Irene"	
October 7	"Goodnight Irene"; Gordon Jenkins and His Orchestra and The Weavers	"Goodnight Irene"; Gordon Jenkins and His Orchestra and The Weavers	"Goodnight Irene"; Gordon Jenkins and His Orchestra and The Weavers	"Goodnight, Irene"	
October 14	"Goodnight Irene"; Gordon Jenkins and His Orchestra and The Weavers	"Goodnight Irene"; Gordon Jenkins and His Orchestra and The Weavers	"Goodnight Irene"; Gordon Jenkins and His Orchestra and The Weavers	"Goodnight, Irene"	
October 21	"Goodnight Irene"; Gordon Jenkins and His Orchestra and The Weavers	"Goodnight Irene"; Gordon Jenkins and His Orchestra and The Weavers	"Goodnight Irene"; Gordon Jenkins and His Orchestra and The Weavers	"Goodnight, Irene"	
October 28	"Goodnight Irene"; Gordon Jenkins and His Orchestra and The Weavers	"All My Love (Bolero)"; Patti Page with Harry Geller & His Orchestra	"Goodnight Irene"; Gordon Jenkins and His Orchestra and The Weavers	"Goodnight, Irene"	
November 4	"Goodnight Irene"; Gordon Jenkins and His Orchestra and The Weavers	"All My Love (Bolero)"; Patti Page with Harry Geller & His Orchestra	"Goodnight Irene"; Gordon Jenkins and His Orchestra and The Weavers	"Harbor Lights"	
November 11	"Goodnight Irene"; Gordon Jenkins and His Orchestra and The Weavers	"All My Love (Bolero)"; Patti Page with Harry Geller & His Orchestra	"Goodnight Irene"; Gordon Jenkins and His Orchestra and The Weavers	"Harbor Lights"	
November 18	"Harbor Lights"; Swing and Sway with Sammy Kaye with Tony Alamo and the Kaydets	"All My Love (Bolero)"; Patti Page with Harry Geller & His Orchestra	"Harbor Lights"; Swing and Sway with Sammy Kaye with Tony Alamo and the Kaydets	"Harbor Lights"	
November 25	"Harbor Lights"; Swing and Sway with Sammy Kaye with Tony Alamo and the Kaydets	"All My Love (Bolero)"; Patti Page with Harry Geller & His Orchestra	"Harbor Lights"; Swing and Sway with Sammy Kaye with Tony Alamo and the Kaydets	"Harbor Lights"	
December 2	"The Thing"; Phil Harris with Orchestra conducted by Walter Scharf	"The Thing"; Phil Harris with Orchestra conducted by Walter Scharf	"Harbor Lights"; Swing and Sway with Sammy Kaye with Tony Alamo and the Kaydets	"Harbor Lights"	
December 9	"The Thing"; Phil Harris with Orchestra conducted by Walter Scharf	"The Thing"; Phil Harris with Orchestra conducted by Walter Scharf	"Harbor Lights"; Swing and Sway with Sammy Kaye with Tony Alamo and the Kaydets	"Harbor Lights"	
December 16	"The Thing"; Phil Harris with Orchestra conducted by Walter Scharf	"The Thing"; Phil Harris with Orchestra conducted by Walter Scharf	"The Tennessee Waltz"; Patti Page with Orchestra conducted by Jack Rael	"The Thing"	
December 23	"The Thing"; Phil Harris with Orchestra conducted by Walter Scharf	"The Thing"; Phil Harris with Orchestra conducted by Walter Scharf	"The Thing"; Phil Harris with Orchestra conducted by Walter Scharf	"Tennessee Waltz"	
December 30	"The Tennessee Waltz"; Patti Page with Orchestra conducted by Jack Rael	"The Thing"; Phil Harris with Orchestra conducted by Walter Scharf	"The Thing"; Phil Harris with Orchestra conducted by Walter Scharf	"Tennessee Waltz"	

== See also ==
- 1950 in music
