= Merry Christmas from Lawrence Welk and His Champagne Music =

Studio album by Lawrence Welk and His Champagne Music
- Released: 1956
- Genres: Easy listening, Christmas music
- Label: Coral

Merry Christmas from Lawrence Welk and His Champagne Music is a Christmas album by Lawrence Welk and His Champagne Music. It was released in 1956 by Coral Records (catalog no. CRL-57093). The album debuted on Billboard magazine's popular albums chart on December 22, 1956, reached the No. 8 spot, and remained on the chart for three weeks.

== Track listing ==
Side 1

1. "Let It Snow! Let It Snow! Let It Snow!" (Jule Styne, Sammy Cahn)
2. "I Wanna Do More Than Whistle (Under The Mistletoe)" (vocals by Alice Lon, The Sparklers, written by Allan Copeland, George Cates, Mort Greene)
3. "White Christmas" (vocals by The Sparklers, written by Irving Berlin)
4. "Christmas Island" (vocals by The Sparklers, written by Lyle Moraine)
5. "The Christmas Toy" (vocal by The Lennon Sisters, written by Mickey Miller, Priscilla Nemoy)
6. "Santa Claus Is Comin' to Town" (written by Haven Gillespie, John Frederick Coots)

Side 2

1. "Winter Wonderland" (vocals by Curt, Dick, Larry (written by Richard Bernhard "Dick" Smith, Felix Bernard)
2. "Christmas Dreaming (A Little Early This Year)" (vocals by Dick Dale) (written by Irving Gordon, Lester Lee)
3. "Christmas Comes But Once a Year" (vocals by Dean, Larry, The Sparklers) (written by Stanley Clayton, Stephen Charles, Van Roberts)
4. "Thanks for Christmas" (vocals by Alice Lon, The Sparklers) (written by Mickey Codian, Richard Barr)
5. "Twelve Gifts of Christmas" (vocals by Dean, Larry, The Sparklers) (written by Buddy Kaye, Joanne Towne)
6. "High on the House Top" (vocals by Larry Hooper) (written by Bill Katz, Ruth Roberts, Stanley Clayton)
