= Mutual Admiration Society (song) =

1956 song from the Broadway musical Happy Hunting

Single by Teresa Brewer
- B-side: "Crazy with Love"
- Released: October 1956
- Genre: Pop
- Length: 2:15
- Label: Coral
- Songwriters: Harold Karr, Matt Dube
- Producer: Dick Jacobs

Teresa Brewer singles chronology
"I Love Mickey" / "Keep Your Cotton Pickin' Paddies Offa My Heart" (1956)	"Mutual Admiration Society" (1956)	"I'm Drowning My Sorrows" / "How Lonely Can One Be" (1957)

"Mutual Admiration Society" is a popular song published in 1956 from the Broadway musical Happy Hunting. The song's tune was written by Harold Karr, the lyrics by Matt Dubey.

== Notable covers ==
- 1956, duet by Ethel Merman and Virginia Gibson, original Broadway version
- 1956, solo by Teresa Brewer, best-selling top-40 version
- 1956, duet by Jaye P. Morgan and Eddy Arnold, reached no. 47 on the chart
- 1964, duet by Al Hirt and Ann-Margret from the album Beauty and the Beard
