= Clancy Lowered the Boom =

Song by Dennis Day
- Written: 1947
- Released: 1949
- Genre: Folk
- Label: RCA Victor
- Lyricists: Hy Heath, Johnny Lange

"Clancy Lowered the Boom" is a song written by Hy Heath and Johnny Lange in 1947, made famous by Dennis Day on Jack Benny's radio program (The Jack Benny Program). The song follows the adventures of a stereotypical Irishman as he "lowers the boom" on any person that gives him "guff". Day's recording for RCA Victor briefly charted in the No. 23 spot in the Billboard charts in 1949.

Several variations of the lyrics are available online, but do not include the final line from Dennis Day's RCA Victor recording: "Now sure, an' it was the most beautiful sight y' ever did see when Clancy lower'd the boom!"

== Others ==
The song was also recorded by Dan Dailey and The Andrews Sisters on March 11, 1949, for Decca Records (catalog No. 24610) and additionally by the Ames Brothers who recorded it for Coral Records (catalog No. 60154) on January 21, 1949. It was Petula Clark's second single in 1949. Alice Faye sang the song at least four times on The Phil Harris-Alice Faye Show. Harry Hibbs recorded a version of the song for his 1972 album, The All New Harry Hibbs With Shrimp Cocktail.

On his VH1 Storytellers record with Willie Nelson, Johnny Cash mentions that the melody for his well-known Columbia Records hit "Don't Take Your Guns to Town" was taken from "Clancy Lowered the Boom".
