= My Bonnie Lassie =

"My Bonnie Lassie" is a popular song, by Roy C. Bennett, Sid Tepper, and Marion McClurg.

== Background ==
The tune is a traditional Scottish tune, "Scotland the Brave."

== Ames Brothers recording ==
The biggest hit version was recorded by The Ames Brothers, and released by RCA Victor Records as catalog number 20-6208. It first reached the Billboard magazine charts on September 24, 1955. On the Disk Jockey chart, it peaked at #14; on the Best Seller chart, at #11; on the Juke Box chart, at #16; on the composite chart of the top 100 songs, it reached #11.

While it is true that the RCA Victor recording of "My Bonnie Lassie" by the Ames Brothers was released in 1955, the RCA matrix number for the recording is E3VW 1322, indicating that it was recorded in 1953. Had the song actually been recorded in 1955, the matrix number would have started with the letter F.

== Popular culture ==
"My Bonnie Lassie" was the entrance/exit song for professional wrestling superstar "Rowdy" Roddy Piper during his wrestling career.
