= Gino Tonetti =

- Born: September 20, 1939 (age 87); Rome, Italy
- Origin: Italy
- Genre: Pop
- Occupation: singer
- Label: Coral

Gino Tonetti is an Italian and American singer.

In the 1960s, he recorded in the United States for Coral Records. When his debut album for the label, titled Gino Tonetti Sings, appeared in 1965, Billboard gave a positive review, writing: "The young six-foot Italian impresses as a distinctive new stylist. His lyric feel and tenderness are foremost throughout his reading of 'This Is All I Ask' and 'My Love Forgive Me'. He swings with ease through 'On the Street Where You Live' and 'C'est si bon'. A newcomer to watch."

Starting from April 20, 1964, he performed at The Living Room, marking his New York debut.

In April 1966, he was reported to soon start recording independently with producer Al Kasha and arranger Bob Halley. He released at least one single produced by Kasha on Ting Records.

He notably made singing appearances on The Ed Sullivan Show (in February 1966 and May 1970), The Merv Griffin Show, and The Tonight Show.
