= Music! Music! Music! =

Single by Teresa Brewer with the Dixieland All Stars
- A-side: "Copenhagen"
- Released: 1950
- Genre: Traditional pop
- Length: 3:20
- Label: London Records
- Songwriters: Stephen Weiss, Bernie Baum

Teresa Brewer singles chronology
"Copper Canyon" (1949)	"Music! Music! Music!" (1950)	"Choo'n Gum" (1950)

"Music! Music! Music! (Put Another Nickel In)" is a popular song written by Stephen Weiss and Bernie Baum and published in 1950.

== Background ==
The first recording of the song was by Etienne Paree with Eddie "Piano" Miller, released by Rainbow Records in 1949 in the United States, titled "Put Another Nickel In – Music, Music, Music (The Nickelodeon Song)".

The biggest-selling version of the song was recorded by Teresa Brewer with the Dixieland All Stars on 20 December 1949, and released on 26 December by London Records as catalog number 604. New York morning radio host Gene Rayburn lobbied for Teresa Brewer to record it. He and Dee Finch played it regularly on WNEW, and it became a number 1 hit and a million-seller in 1950. It became Brewer's signature song and earned her the nickname "Miss Music". It was released as the B-side to "Copenhagen" but eclipsed "Copenhagen" as a hit.

When Brewer was signed to Coral Records in 1951, they re-recorded the song and issued it as a single in 1953.

It was also recorded by many artists on various labels and other hit versions in 1950 were by Carmen Cavallaro (reached No. 5), Freddy Martin (No. 5), Ames Brothers (No. 14), Hugo Winterhalter (No. 17) and Mickey Katz (No. 18).

Some radio stations refused to play the record because of the thought that the lyric "I'd do anything for you/Anything you'd want me to" might be construed as indecent.

== Other notable versions ==
- A version recorded by British singer Petula Clark was popular in Australia the same year.
- Bing Crosby sang a version for his Chesterfield radio show on 5 April 1950 which has since been released on CD.
- Joe Loss and his Orchestra recorded a version in London on 6 March 1950. It was released by EMI on the His Master's Voice label as catalogue numbers BD 6065, IM 1476 and HE 2793.
- Peggy Lee included the song on her 1958 album Jump for Joy.
- An instrumental version was recorded by Bill Haley & His Comets in 1959 and released as a single in 1960; it was the band's final release for Decca Records and was only a minor hit.
- In 1961, Ray Charles recorded an instrumental version for his album The Genius After Hours.
- The R&B group the Sensations released a rendition in 1961.
- The song was covered by the Happenings in the late 1960s.
- Melanie included the song in her 1972 hit "The Nickel Song", which was included on her 1976 album Photograph.
- Guy Mitchell released a version that can be found on several of his greatest hits albums.

== Influence ==
- Light classical music composer Leroy Anderson based his piece "Classical Jukebox" on the song.

== Other versions by Teresa Brewer ==
Teresa Brewer recorded several renditions of the song during her career. In addition to the London version, the Coral label made a recording for their catalog, which had a larger orchestral arrangement, faster tempo, and stronger beat. When she moved to the Philips label in 1962, Brewer made a new recording in Nashville. In 1973, she recorded a rendition with a strong rock and roll beat on the Amsterdam label. It reached #84 in Canada. When Brewer was with the RCA label in 1974–75, she recorded yet another new version. Finally, in 1976 she recorded a disco version for her husband Bob Thiele's Signature imprint. Only the original London release was a national chart hit, although the 1973 version was a regional hit in some markets, including Milwaukee (it charted on Top 40 station WOKY's survey). In 1977, she performed the song on The Muppet Show.

== Media ==
The tune was used in the most famous version of Nestlé Maggi advertisement, especially in India.

The "Come closer" bridge is from Liszt's Hungarian Rhapsody No. 2.

An instrumental version was also used as the theme song for the network Nickelodeon from 1979 to 1981 that played during the Mime interstitials.

1950 London version

1974 RCA version

1976 disco version

1973 rock version

== See also ==
- List of Billboard number-one singles of 1950
- List of Cash Box Best Sellers number-one singles of 1950
