= Ames Brothers =

American singing quartet

The Ames Brothers
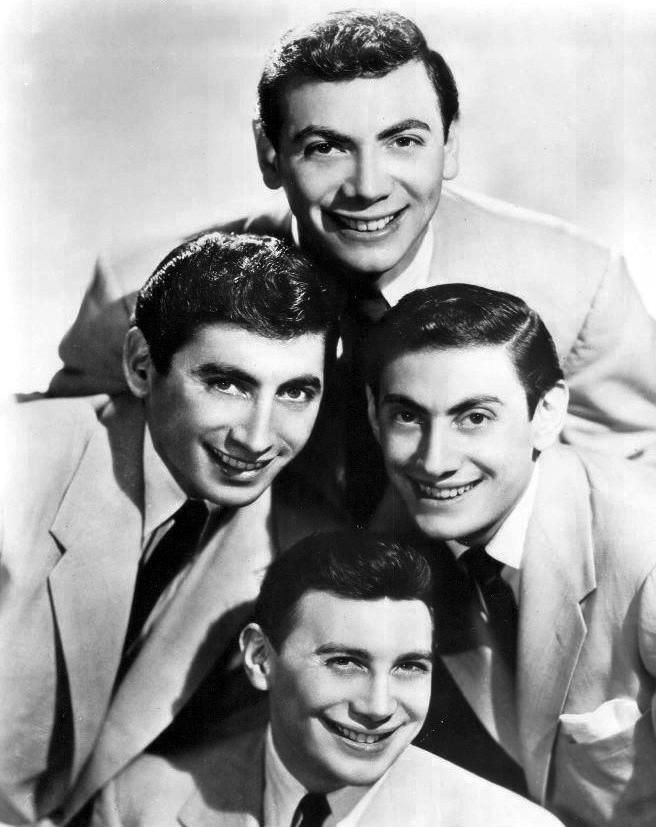
- The Ames Brothers in 1955. Clockwise from top: Ed, Vic, Joe and Gene.

Background information
- Origin: Malden, Massachusetts, US
- Genre: Traditional pop
- Years active: 1947–1963
- Labels: Decca, Coral, RCA Victor
- Past members: Ed Ames; Vic Ames; Joe Ames; Gene Ames

The Ames Brothers were an American singing quartet, consisting of four siblings from Malden, Massachusetts, who were particularly famous in the 1950s for their traditional pop hits.

== Biography ==
The Urick brothers were born in Malden, Massachusetts. Joe (May 3, 1921 – December 22, 2007), Gene (February 13, 1924 – April 26, 1997), Vic (May 20, 1925 – January 23, 1978), and Ed (July 9, 1927 – May 21, 2023) formed the singing group the Amory Brothers, which would become the Ames Brothers.

Born into a non-professional but musically talented family, the boys were raised to enjoy classical music and operatic music. Their parents, David and Sarah Urick, were Russian Jewish immigrants from Ukraine who read Shakespeare and semi-classics to their nine children from the time they were old enough to listen.

Three of the brothers formed a quartet with a cousin named Lennie, and had been touring United States Army and Navy bases entertaining the troops when they were offered a job at The Fox and Hounds nightclub, one of the fanciest clubs in Boston. This one-week engagement turned into several months when positive word-of-mouth about their appearance got around. At the time, they were using Vic's middle name and calling themselves the Amory Brothers. They were becoming quite popular in the area and it was at this time that Joe decided to rejoin the group. Taking their act to New York City, they got a job with bandleader Art Mooney. One day while at Leeds Publishing Company in search of a song called "Should I" that their mother had asked them to sing, Milt Gabler of Decca Records overheard the brothers singing it and asked them to cut a few sides for Decca Records, just before the year-long AFM recording ban which James Petrillo imposed in January 1948. The brothers shortened Amory to Ames and became the first artists to record for the newly founded Decca subsidiary label, Coral Records.

The group performed on Robert Q. Lewis's radio program until it was cut from one hour to 15 minutes. In late February 1949, they began performing on Sing It Again, a musical quiz program on CBS radio.

In January 1950, the brothers were swept into national top billing with their first hit record, "Rag Mop". Appearing on radio shows for no pay at times, just for the experience, they later became a regular Arthur Godfrey and His Friends. One of the first acts to appear on the original The Ed Sullivan Show when it was known as Toast of the Town, the foursome made their debut with him when the show was telecast live from Wanamaker's Department Store.

The Ames Brothers were soon the top paid group in nightclubs and supper clubs everywhere and their popularity on television was nationwide. In 1956, they starred in their own syndicated TV program, The Ames Brothers Show, sponsored by RC Cola and broadcast on Friday nights. It was the first syndicated TV show to be broadcast in foreign countries. The brothers also appeared on ABC's The Pat Boone Chevy Showroom.

The Ames Brothers recorded prodigiously and notched up 49 US chart entries, 21 of them on the Coral label before signing with RCA Victor in 1953. After a 15 year career, the quartet disbanded in 1963, but Ed Ames continued with a successful singing and acting career, including playing Daniel Boone's sidekick, Mingo, on the popular Daniel Boone television series.

== Legacy ==
The Ames Brothers were inducted into the Vocal Group Hall of Fame in 1998.

== Later years ==
Vic died in a car accident in 1978 at age 52, Gene died of cancer in 1997 at age 73, and Joe died of a heart attack in 2007 at age 86. Ed, the last surviving Ames Brother, died in 2023 at the age of 95.

== Discography ==
=== Singles ===
NOTE: Repeat titles of Coral tracks shown below are standard singles and not under Coral's "Silver Star Series" reissue line

Year	Single (A-side, B-side) Both sides from same album except where indicated	Chart positions			Album Standard 12" records except where indicated
Year	Single (A-side, B-side) Both sides from same album except where indicated	Billboard Singles Charts	Cashbox Singles Charts	UK	Album Standard 12" records except where indicated
1947	"Caravan" b/w "There Is No Breeze"	—	—	—	Non-album tracks
1947	"Goodnight My Love" b/w "It Shouldn't Happen to a Dream"; Above two singles shown as "The Armory Brothers"	—	—	—	Non-album tracks
1948	"Tell Me a Story" b/w "If You Had All the World and Its Gold"	—	—	—	Non-album tracks
1948	"A Tree in the Meadow" (with Monica Lewis) b/w "On the Street of Regret"	21	—	—	Non-album tracks
1948	"Where the Apple Blossoms Fall" b/w "If I Live to Be a Hundred"; Both tracks with Monica Lewis	—	—	—	Non-album tracks
1949	"You, You, You Are the One" b/w "More Beer" (from Hoop-De-Doo 10-inch LP)	23	—	—	Non-album tracks
1949	"I'm Just Wild About Harry" b/w "Good Fellow Medley"	—	—	—	Non-album tracks
1949	"Far Away Places" b/w "Lorelei" (from Sentimental Me 10-inch LP)	—	—	—	Non-album tracks
1949	"Cruising Down the River" b/w "Clancy Lowered the Boom" (Non-album track)	29	—	—	Favorite Songs (10-inch LP)
1949	"It Only Happens Once" b/w "You Can't Buy Happiness"	—	—	—	Non-album tracks
1949	"Barroom Polka" b/w "We'll Still Be Honeymooning" (Non-album track)	—	—	—	Hoop-De-Doo (10-inch LP)
1949	"St. Bernard Waltz" b/w "Oh, You Sweet One" (from Favorite Songs 10-inch LP)	—	—	—	Non-album tracks
1949	"Lingering Down the Lane" b/w "Still Waters and Green Pastures" (Non-album track)	—	—	—	Sentimental Me (10-inch LP)
1949	"Noah's Ark" b/w "Tears of Happiness" (Non-album track)	—	—	—	Hoop-De-Doo (10-inch LP)
1949	"Good Fellow Medley"—Part 1 b/w Part 2	—	—	—	Non-album tracks
1949	"White Christmas" b/w "Winter Wonderland"	—	—	—	Christmas Harmony
1950	"Sentimental Me" b/w "Blue Prelude" (from Favorite Songs 10-inch LP)	—	—	—	Sentimental Me (10-inch LP)
1950	"Rag Mop" /	1	—	—	Hoop-Dee-Doo (10-inch LP)
1950	"Sentimental Me"	1	—	—	Sentimental Me (10-inch LP)
1950	"(Put Another Nickel In) Music! Music! Music!" b/w "I Love Her Oh! Oh! Oh!"	14	—	—	Non-album tracks
1950	"I Didn't Kiss the Blarney Stone" b/w "Clancy Lowered the Boom"	—	—	—	Non-album tracks
1950	"(Fifi) Bring Her Out Again" b/w "(Lift Your Glass) Sing Until the Cows Come Home" (from Hoop-De-Doo 10-inch LP)	—	—	—	Non-album tracks
1950	"Dormi, Dormi" b/w "Marianna" (from Hoop-De-Doo 10-inch LP)	—	—	—	Sentimental Me (10-inch LP)
1950	"Stars Are the Windows of Heaven" b/w "Hoop Dee Doo" (from Hoop-De-Doo 10-inch LP)	17	—	—	Sentimental Me (10-inch LP)
1950	"Can Anyone Explain? (No, No, No)" b/w "Sittin' 'N Starin' 'N Rockin'" (Non-album track)	5	—	—	Sentimental Me (10-inch LP)
1950	"Twelve Days of Christmas" b/w "Wassail Song"	—	—	—	Sing a Song of Christmas (10-inch LP)
1950	"Silent Night" b/w "Adeste Fidelis"	—	—	—	Christmas Harmony
1950	"Hark! The Herald Angels Sing" b/w "It Came Upon the Midnight Clear"	—	—	—	Christmas Harmony
1950	"Thirsty for Your Kisses" b/w "I Don't Mind Being All Alone" (from Sentimental Me 10-inch LP)	26	—	—	Favorite Songs (10-inch LP)
1950	"Oh Babe!" b/w "To Think You've Chosen Me" (from Sentimental Me 10-inch LP)	20	—	—	Non-album tracks
1950	"The Thing" b/w "Music by the Angels" (from The Ames Brothers)	29	—	—	Non-album tracks
1951	"Meet Me Tonight in Dreamland" b/w "Moonlight Bay"	—	—	—	In the Evening by the Moonlight (10-inch LP)
1951	"Love's Old Sweet Song" b/w "Because"	—	—	—	In the Evening by the Moonlight (10-inch LP)
1951	"Music by the Angels" b/w "Loving Is Believing" (Non-album track)	—	—	—	The Ames Brothers
1951	"More Than I Care to Remember" b/w "Three Dollars and Ninety-eight Cents"	—	—	—	Non-album tracks
1951	"Sentimental Me" b/w "Dormi, Dormi"	—	—	—	Sentimental Me (10-inch LP)
1951	"Can Anyone Explain (No, No, No)" b/w "Lingering Down the Lane"	—	—	—	Sentimental Me (10-inch LP)
1951	"To Think You've Chosen Me" b/w "Lorelei"	—	—	—	Sentimental Me (10-inch LP)
1951	"I Don't Mind Being All Alone" b/w "Stars Are the Windows of Heaven"	—	—	—	Sentimental Me (10-inch LP)
1951	"My Love Seranade" b/w "I Love You Much Too Much" (from The Ames Brothers)	—	—	—	My Love Serenade
1951	"Too Many Women" b/w "Somewhere There Must Be Happiness"	—	—	—	Non-album tracks
1951	"Wang Wang Blues" b/w "Who'll Take My Place (When I'm Gone)"	16	—	—	My Love Serenade
1951	"Hawaiian War Chant" b/w "Sweet Leilani"	21	—	—	Sweet Leilani (10-inch LP)
1951	"To You Sweetheart, Aloha" b/w "My Little Grass Shack in Kealakekua, Hawaii"	—	—	—	Sweet Leilani (10-inch LP)
1951	"Song of the Islands" b/w "Sing Me a Song of the Islands"	—	—	—	Sweet Leilani (10-inch LP)
1951	"The Moon of Manakoora" b/w "Blue Hawaii"	—	—	—	Sweet Leilani (10-inch LP)
1951	"Only, Only You" b/w "Everything's Gonna Be Alright"	—	—	—	Non-album tracks
1951	"Undecided" /	2	—	—	Our Golden Favorites
1951	"Sentimental Journey"	23	—	—	Our Golden Favorites
1951	"Jolly Old Saint Nicholas" b/w "Ting-a-Ling-a-Jingle"	—	—	—	Non-album tracks
1952	"I Wanna Love You" /	19	—	—	Non-album tracks
1952	"I'll Still Love You"	29	—	—	The Ames Brothers
1952	"Mother, at Your Feet Is Kneeling" b/w "Lovely Lady Dressed in Blue"	—	—	—	Non-album tracks
1952	"Dry Bones" b/w "Deep River"	—	—	—	Favorite Spirituals (10-inch LP)
1952	"Joshua Fit De Battle of Jericho" b/w "Go Down Moses"	—	—	—	Favorite Spirituals (10-inch LP)
1952	"Stardust" b/w "Crazy 'Cause I Love You" (Non-album track)	—	—	—	Our Golden Favorites
1952	"The Sheik of Araby" b/w "And So I Waited Around" (Non-album track)	—	18	—	The Ames Brothers
1952	"Auf Wiederseh'n Sweetheart" b/w "Break the Bands That Bind Me" (Non-album track)	13	—	—	Favorite Songs (10-inch LP)
1952	"String Along" b/w "Absence Makes the Heart Grow Fonder"	18	16	—	Favorite Songs (10-inch LP)
1952	"My Favorite Song" b/w "Al-Lee-O Al-Lee-Ay" (Non-album track)	15	12	—	Favorite Songs (10-inch LP)
1952	"Sing a Song of Santa Claus" b/w "Winter's Here Again"	—	—	—	Christmas Harmony
1953	"No Moon at All" b/w "Do Nothin' till You Hear from Me"	21	19	—	Non-album tracks
1953	"You Are My Sunshine" b/w "Rye Whiskey"	—	—	—	Home on the Range (10-inch LP)
1953	"Can't I?" b/w "Lonely Wine" (Non-album track)	23	—	—	My Love Serenade
1953	"Candy Bar Boogie" b/w "At the End of a Rainbow" (Non-album track)	—	—	—	The Ames Brothers
1953	"Always In My Dreams" b/w "This Is Fiesta"	—	—	—	Non-album tracks
1953	"You, You, You" b/w "Once Upon a Time" (Non-album track)	1	1	—	The Best of the Ames Brothers
1953	"Lazy River" b/w "Stardust" (from Our Golden Favorites)	—	—	—	My Love Serenade
1953	"My Love, My Life, My Happiness" b/w "If You Want My Heart"	29	19	—	Non-album tracks
1953	"I Can't Believe That You're in Love with Me" /	22	40	—	Sweet and Swing
1953	"Boogie Woogie Maxixe"	—	25	—	Non-album track
1954	"The Man with the Banjo" /	6	8	—	The Best of the Ames Brothers
1954	"Man, Man, Is For The Woman Made"	30	25	—	For Sentimental Reasons
1954	"Don't Believe a Word They Say" b/w "Don't Lie to Me"	—	—	—	Non-album tracks
1954	"Leave It to Your Heart" /	29	27	—	Sweet and Swing
1954	"Let's Walk and Talk"	—	48	—	Non-album tracks
1954	"Hopelessly" /	26	—	—	Non-album tracks
1954	"One More Time"	—	44	—	Non-album tracks
1954	"The Naughty Lady of Shady Lane" /	3	3	6	The Best of the Ames Brothers
1954	"Addio"	—	40	—	Non-album tracks
1955	"Sweet Brown-Eyed Baby" b/w "Sympathetic Eyes"	—	28	—	Non-album tracks
1955	"Gotta Be This or That" b/w "Southern Cross" (Non-album track)	—	—	—	The Ames Brothers (RCA)
1955	"My Bonnie Lassie" b/w "So Will I" (Non-album track)	11	16	—	Sweet and Swing
1955	"The Next Time It Happens" b/w "My Love, Your Love" (Non-album track)	—	—	—	Sweet and Swing
1956	"Forever Darling" /	35	27	—	It's Show Time
1956	"I'm Gonna Love You"	84	—	—	Non-album track
1956	"It Only Hurts for a Little While" /	11	14	—	Sweet and Swing
1956	"If You Wanna See Mamie Tonight"	89	—	—	Sweet and Swing
1956	"49 Shades of Green" /	49	—	—	Sweet and Swing
1956	"Summer Sweetheart"	67	—	—	Sweet and Swing
1956	"I Saw Esau" b/w "The Game of Love"	51	—	—	Sweet and Swing
1957	"I Know Only One Way to Love You" b/w "Did You Ever Get the Roses"	—	—	—	Non-album tracks
1957	"Yeah, Yeah, Yeah (It's So Good)" b/w "Man on Fire" (from It's Show Time)	—	—	—	Non-album tracks
1957	"Tammy" /	5	10	—	The Best of the Ames Brothers
1957	"Rockin' Shoes"	64	41	—	Non-album track
1957	"Melodie D'Amour (Melody of Love)" b/w "So Little Time" (Non-album track)	5	7	—	The Best of the Ames Brothers
1958	"Little Gypsy" b/w "In Love"	67	—	—	Non-album tracks
1958	"A Very Precious Love" b/w "Don't Leave Me Now" (from For Sentimental Reasons)	23	53	—	The Best of the Ames Brothers
1958	"Stay" /	90	—	—	Non-album tracks
1958	"Little Serenade"	98	45	—	Non-album tracks
1958	"Pussy Cat" /	17	36	—	Non-album tracks
1958	"No One But You (In My Heart)"	45	34	—	Non-album tracks
1958	"It's Only a Paper Moon" b/w "I Don't Know Why (I Just Do)" (from Sweet Seventeen)	—	—	—	Destination Moon
1958	"Red River Rose" b/w "When the Summer Comes Again"	37	33	—	Non-album tracks
1959	"Dancin' in the Streets" b/w "(Yes, I Need) Only Your Love"	—	—	—	Non-album tracks
1959	"Someone to Come Home to" b/w "Mason-Dixon Line"	78	84	—	Non-album tracks
1959	"Now It's Me" b/w "Now Hear This"	—	—	—	Non-album tracks
1959	"Take Me Along" b/w "What Do I Hear"	—	124	—	Non-album tracks
1960	"China Doll" b/w "Christopher Sunday"	38	69	—	Non-album tracks
1960	"Me Lo Dijo Adela" b/w "Quizas, Quizas, Quizas"	—	—	—	Hello Amigos
1960	"A Happy Pair" b/w "Carnival"	—	—	—	Non-album tracks
1960	"Ring Them Bells" b/w "You Are My Love"	—	—	—	Non-album tracks
1960	"Where the Hot Wind Blows" b/w "Suzie Wong"	—	—	—	Non-album tracks
1961	"A Kiss from Cora" b/w "Asking for You"	—	—	—	Non-album tracks
1962	"Love Me with All Your Heart" b/w "Love Is an Ocean (Of Emotion)"	—	—	—	Non-album tracks
1963	"The Wrong Man" b/w "Surrender, Surrender"	—	—	—	Non-album tracks
1963	"Washington Square" b/w "Knees Up Mother Brown" (from Knees Up! Mother Brown)	129	—	—	Non-album tracks

=== Albums ===
- Sing a Song of Christmas (1950)
- Sweet Leilani (1951)
- Sentimental Me (1951)
- Home on the Range (1952)
- Favorite Spirituals (1952)
- Hoop-De-Doo (1952)
- In the Evening by the Moonlight (1953)
- Love's Old Sweet Songs (1955)
- The Magic Melting Pot of Melody with Hugo Winterhalter and His Orchestra (1956)
- Exactly Like You with Joe Reisman and His Orchestra (1956)
- The Ames Brothers with Hugo Winterhalter and His Orchestra (1956)
- My Love Serenade (1957)
- The Sounds of Christmas Harmony (1957)
- There'll Always Be a Christmas with Sid Ramin's Orchestra (1957) (No. 16 on Billboard's albums chart)
- Destination Moon with Sid Ramin's Orchestra (1958)
- Smoochin' Time with Sid Ramin's Orchestra (1958)
- The Best of the Ames (1958)
- The Ames Brothers Sing the Best in the Country (1959)
- The Ames Brothers Sing Famous Hits of Famous Quartets with Hugo Winterhalter and His Orchestra (1959)
- Hello Amigos with Esquivel's Orchestra (1960)
- The Blend and the Beat (1960)
- Hello Italy! (arranged by Bill McElhiney) (1963)
- Knees Up! Mother Brown (1963)
- For Sentimental Reasons (1964)
- Down Memory Lane with the Ames Brothers (1964)
- This Is The Ames Brothers (1972)
- The Best of the Ames (1975; reissue of the 1958 LP)
- The Very Best Of The Ames Brothers (1998)
