= He Understands Me =

Single by Teresa Brewer

from the album Terrific Teresa Brewer!
- B-side: "Just Before We Say Goodbye"
- Released: 1963
- Genre: Pop
- Length: 2:55
- Label: Philips
- Songwriters: Margie Singleton & Merle Kilgore

Teresa Brewer singles chronology
"Second Hand Rose" (1963)	"He Understands Me" (1963)	"I Hear the Angels Singing" (1964)

"He Understands Me" is a song released in 1963 by Teresa Brewer. The song was a hit single for Johnny Tillotson in 1964, retitled "She Understands Me", and Bobby Vinton in 1966, retitled "Dum-De-Da".

== Teresa Brewer version ==
Teresa Brewer released the original version of the song in 1963, arranged by Stan Applebaum, as a single and on the album Terrific Teresa Brewer! On November 9, 1963, Brewer's version charted at No. 130 on Billboard's Bubbling Under the Hot 100 and reached No. 45 on Cash Box's "Looking Ahead" chart of singles with potential of entering the Cash Box Top 100.

== Johnny Tillotson version ==
"She Understands Me"

Single by Johnny Tillotson

from the album She Understands Me
- B-side: "Tomorrow"
- Released: 1964
- Genre: Pop
- Length: 1:58
- Label: MGM
- Songwriters: Margie Singleton & Merle Kilgore

Johnny Tillotson singles chronology
"Worry" (1964)	"She Understands Me" (1964)	"Angel" (1965)

In 1964, Johnny Tillotson released a version of the song, retitled "She Understands Me", as a single and on the album She Understands Me. Tillotson's version spent 11 weeks on the Billboard Hot 100 chart, peaking at No. 31, while reaching No. 4 on Billboard's Middle-Road Singles chart, No. 29 on the Cash Box Top 100, No. 25 on Canada's RPM "Top 40 & 5", and No. 5 in Malaysia.

== Bobby Vinton version ==
"Dum-De-Da"

Single by Bobby Vinton
- B-side: "Blue Clarinet"
- Released: 1966
- Genre: Pop
- Length: 2:01
- Label: Epic
- Songwriters: Margie Singleton & Merle Kilgore

Bobby Vinton singles chronology
"Tears" (1966)	"Dum-De-Da" (1966)	"Petticoat White (Summer Sky Blue)" (1966)

In 1966, Bobby Vinton released a version of the song, retitled "Dum-De-Da", as a single. Vinton's version spent 6 weeks on the Billboard Hot 100 chart, peaking at No. 40, while reaching No. 24 on Billboard's Middle-Road Singles chart, No. 32 on the Cash Box Top 100, No. 35 on Record World's "100 Top Pops", and No. 29 on Canada's RPM 100.

== French adaptation ==
A French language adaptation, titled "Dum di la", with lyrics written by Georges Aber, was released in 1964 by Sylvie Vartan. A track on the EP La plus belle pour aller danser, Vartan’s version reached No. 3 in Wallonia.
