= Teresa Brewer =

American singer (1931–2007)

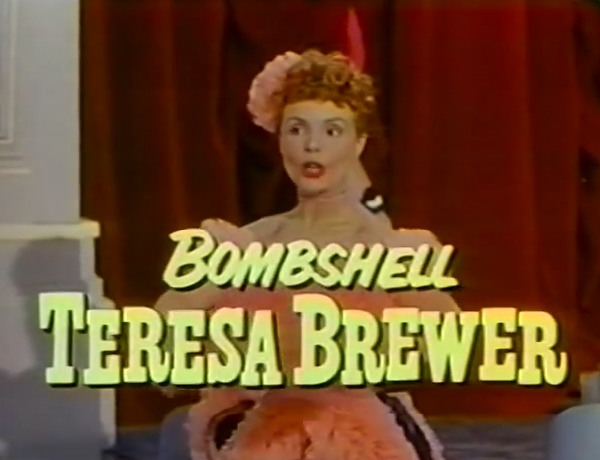
- Brewer in the trailer for the film Those Redheads from Seattle

Background information
- Born: Theresa Veronica Breuer; May 7, 1931; Toledo, Ohio, U.S.
- Died: October 17, 2007 (aged 76) New Rochelle, New York, U.S.
- Genres: Traditional pop; country; jazz; R&B; rock 'n roll; musicals; novelty songs
- Occupation: Singer
- Years active: 1949–1999
- Labels: London; Coral; RCA Victor; Philips; Columbia
- Spouse(s): William "Bill" Monahan (m. 1949; sep. 1972) Bob Thiele

Teresa Brewer (born Theresa Veronica Breuer; May 7, 1931 – October 17, 2007) was an American singer whose style incorporated pop, country, jazz, R&B, rock 'n roll, musicals, and novelty songs. She was one of the most prolific and popular female singers of the 1950s, recording around 600 songs.

== Early life ==
Brewer was born in Toledo, Ohio, the eldest of five siblings. Her father Ludwig Breuer, a German immigrant, was a glass inspector for Libbey-Owens-Ford (later acquired by Pilkington Glass), and her mother Helen (nee Kasap) Breuer, a housewife, was of Polish ancestry. The family were practicing Catholics, and she was a member of the Roman Catholic Church most of her life.

== Career ==
=== 1933–1948: Early singing and first appearances ===
Her singing career began almost as soon as she was able to walk and talk. When Brewer was two years old, her mother entered her in The Uncle August Kiddie Show on Toledo's WSPD and she was a hit with audiences. At the age of seven, Brewer entered The Major Bowes Amateur Hour and was soon touring around the country with them. When she was 12, her mother pulled her from the road to finish school.

As she progressed through high school she was able to skip a grade. She would have graduated from grade 12 in 1948 at age 17, a year early. Around January 1948 she won a contest in Toledo that led her to the Stairway To The Stars contest show in New York. There she was a winner and the prize was a week's performance at the Latin Quarter club. It was there that she met her first husband, Bill Monahan. Accompanied by her aunt Mary, she decided to stay in New York and do more performing. Being the legal age of 16 she was able to leave school, which she had disliked, and she did not receive a graduation diploma.

=== 1949–1969: Commercial success ===
An agent, Richie Lisella, heard her sing and took her career in hand, and in 1949 she was signed to a contract with London Records. The same year she recorded the song "Copenhagen" with the Dixieland All-Stars along with a number of other recordings. For the B side she recorded the song "Music! Music! Music!". Unexpectedly, it was not the A side but this B side which took off, selling over a million copies and becoming Teresa's signature song. Another novelty song, "Choo'n Gum", hit the top 20 in 1950, followed by "Molasses, Molasses". Like many singers, she preferred ballads as they offered more opportunity to show off her vocal abilities, but the only ballad she recorded to make the charts was "Longing for You" in 1951.

In 1951 Brewer switched labels, going to Coral Records. Since she never learned to read music, she had demos sent to her to learn the melodies of the songs she would record. She had a number of hits for Coral and re-recorded "Music! Music! Music!" with the new label (and would record it a third time for a Mercury label greatest hits collection in 1962). In 1952, she recorded "You'll Never Get Away" in a duet with Don Cornell, followed in 1953 by her best selling hit, "Till I Waltz Again with You". In the mid-1950s she did a number of covers of rhythm and blues songs like "Pledging My Love" and "Tweedle Dee". She covered some country songs including "Jilted", "I Gotta Go Get My Baby", and "Let Me Go, Lover!". In 1956 she co-wrote "I Love Mickey", about New York Yankees center fielder Mickey Mantle, who appeared on the record with Brewer. It was also reported that the two had developed a mutual attraction. Another 1956 hit was Brewer's syncopated rendition of "Mutual Admiration Society". In the same year her hit "A Sweet Old Fashioned Girl" demonstrated in one song her ballad and rock talents. In 1957 she recorded more covers: of the country song "Teardrops in My Heart" and the R&B songs "You Send Me" and "Empty Arms".

Teresa Brewer Showcase was the first LP she released; it was a collection of several of her early recordings with London Records but did not include her two hits "Music! Music! Music!" or "Choo 'n Gum." Most of the albums she released with Coral over the 1950s were typical LPs of the era, featuring more collections of songs and cover versions rather than thematic ideas – one exception was the Catholic-flavored Christmas album At Christmas Time (1957). The last charting hit she had was "Milord" in 1961. Brewer continued releasing albums throughout the 1960s, but the British Invasion in the mid-1960s quickly eliminated most interest in older singers and her record sales dwindled.

She appeared as Pat Edmonds in the 1953 film musical Those Redheads from Seattle. Paramount studio had done surveys in movie theaters asking people who their favorite singers were. She and Guy Mitchell won in their categories and were chosen for the film. She won as America's favorite female singer at least three years. Her song from the film, "Baby Baby Baby", was successful as a single. She had natural brown hair, but had it dyed red for the role. She then kept it colored red for many years for her performances.

=== 1970–1996: Later career and recordings ===
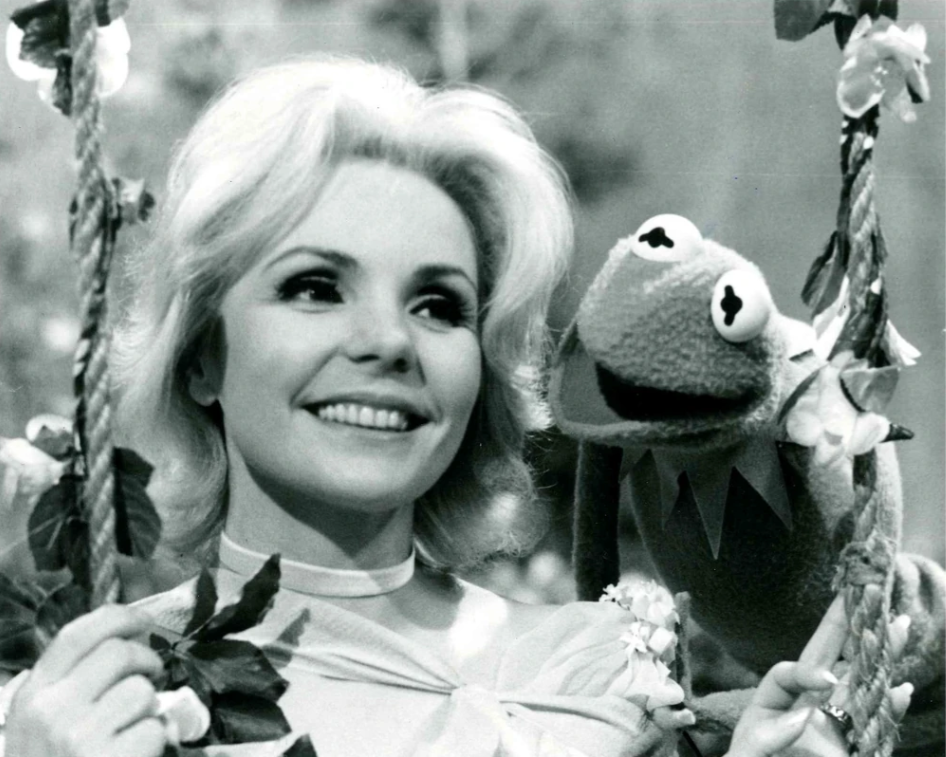
Brewer on The Muppet Show in 1977

Brewer re-emerged as a jazz vocalist on Bob Thiele's Amsterdam label in the 1970s and 1980s, recording a number of albums including tribute albums to Bessie Smith, Louis Armstrong, Fats Waller and Irving Berlin. She also recorded with such jazz musicians including Count Basie, Duke Ellington, Dizzy Gillespie, Earl Hines, Svend Asmussen, and Bobby Hackett. A landmark recording in her career was Softly I Swing (Red Baron Records, 1992), which was produced by Thiele and featured David Murray, Ron Carter, Kenny Barron, and Grady Tate. Memories of Louis, also recorded for Thiele's Red Baron Records, paired her with a different well-known trumpeter on each track, including Clark Terry, Nicholas Payton, Ruby Braff, Freddie Hubbard, Wynton Marsalis, Roy Hargrove, Sweets Edison, Lew Soloff, Terence Blanchard, Yank Lawson, Red Rodney, and Dizzy Gillespie.

Her rendition of "Danny's Song" for the 1972 album Singin' a Doo Dah Song would return on subsequent compilations, including Her Greatest Hits (1975), Portrait (1986), and Sixteen Most Requested Songs (1991). Brewer sang "The Star-Spangled Banner" at the 1968 MLB All Star Game.

One of her later singles, "Another Useless Day", was written by Chas Hodges (later one half of "rockney" British duo Chas & Dave) with Albert Lee featuring on guitar. Hodges's band Oily Rags (also signed up by Bob Thiele) provided backing for Brewer's album Teresa Brewer in London (1973), as well as many songs for Teresa Brewer's New Album (1977).

She appeared on television as a guest star on such series as Ed Sullivan, Perry Como, Jimmy Dean, The Muppet Show in 1977, Sha Na Na, and The Statler Brothers Show in 1993.

Thiele, whom she had married, died in 1996, and Brewer never recorded after that. Altogether, she recorded around 600 song titles.

== Personal life ==
Brewer married William "Bill" Monahan in 1949; the couple had four daughters, Kathleen, Susan, Megan and Michelle. They eventually separated, and the marriage was dissolved in 1972 shortly before she married Bob Thiele.

== Honors ==
For her contribution to the recording industry, Teresa Brewer has a star on the Hollywood Walk of Fame at 1708 Vine Street. In 2007, she was inducted into the Hit Parade Hall of Fame.

== Death ==
Brewer died of progressive supranuclear palsy (PSP), a neuromuscular disease, at her home in New Rochelle, New York, aged 76. Her funeral was held at New Rochelle's Holy Name of Jesus Roman Catholic Church, where she was a member. Her ashes were given to her daughter.

== Influences ==
One of Elvis Presley's first public singing experiences in 12th grade was performing a song of Brewer's: "Till I Waltz Again with You".

== Discography ==
The list below shows the singer's singles only. Her full discography, singles, albums, and other releases are described in a separate article.

Year	Single (A-side, B-side) Both sides from same album except where indicated Some tracks from 10-inch LP's did not appear on any standard albums	Chart positions			Album
Year	Single (A-side, B-side) Both sides from same album except where indicated Some tracks from 10-inch LP's did not appear on any standard albums	US	CB	UK	Album
1949	"Copper Canyon" b/w "Way Back Home"; Teresa Brewer & Bobby Wayne	—	25	—	Non-album tracks
1950	"Music! Music! Music!" b/w "Copenhagen"	1	1	—	Non-album tracks
1950	"Choo'n Gum" b/w "Honky Tonkin'"	17	11	—	Non-album tracks
1950	"Punky Punkin'" b/w "Cincinnati Dancing Pig"	—	—	—	Non-album tracks
1950	"Molasses Molasses" b/w "Grizzly Bear"	—	—	—	Non-album tracks
1950	"The Thing" b/w "I Guess I'll Have to Dream the Rest"	—	—	—	Non-album tracks
1951	"Let's Have a Party" / "The Picnic Song"; Teresa Brewer, Claire Hogan, Snooky Lanson & Bobby Wayne	—	—	—	Non-album tracks
1951	"A Penny a Kiss, A Penny a Hug" b/w "Hello"; Teresa Brewer & Snooky Lanson	—	—	—	Non-album tracks
1951	"If You Want Some Lovin'" b/w "I've Got the Craziest Feeling"	—	—	—	Non-album tracks
1951	"Lonesome Gal" b/w "Counterfeit Kisses"	—	—	—	Non-album tracks
1951	"Oceana Roll" b/w "Wang Wang Blues"	—	—	—	
1951	"If You Don't Marry Me" /"I Wish I Wuz"	—	—	—	
1951	"Longing for You" b/w "Jazz Me Blues"	23	—	—	
1952	"Sing Sing Sing" b/w "I Don't Care"	—	—	—	Till I Waltz Again with You (10-inch LP)
1952	"Lovin' Machine" b/w "Noodlin' Rag" (on Teresa Brewer (Vocalion))	—	—	—	Non-album track
1952	"Gonna Get Along Without Ya Now" b/w "Roll Them Roly-Boly Eyes" (on Teresa Brewer (Vocalion))	25	—	—	Till I Waltz Again with You (10-inch LP)
1952	"I Hear the Bluebells" b/w "Kisses on Paper"	—	—	—	Non-album tracks
1952	"Rhode Island Redhead"; Teresa Brewer b/w "En-Thus-E-Us-E-As-M"; Eileen Barton (Non-album track)	—	—	—	Teresa Brewer (Vocalion)
1952	"You'll Never Get Away" b/w "The Hookey Song"; Don Cornell & Teresa Brewer	17	17	—	Non-album tracks
1952	"Till I Waltz Again with You" b/w "Hello Bluebird"	1	1	—	Till I Waltz Again with You (10-inch LP)
1953	"Dancin' with Someone (Longin' for You)" b/w "Breakin' in the Blues"	17	20	—	Till I Waltz Again with You (10-inch LP)
1953	"Into Each Life Some Rain Must Fall" b/w "Too Much Mustard"	23	—	—	Time for Teresa
1953	"Ricochet (Rick-O-Shay)"	2	2	—	Teresa
1953	"Too Young to Tango"	—	39	—	The Best of Teresa Brewer
1953	"Baby, Baby, Baby" b/w "I Guess It Was You All the Time"	12	20	—	Non-album tracks
1953	"Bell Bottom Blues" /	17	14	—	Teresa
1953	"Our Heartbreaking Waltz"	23	30	—	Non-album tracks
1953	"I Saw Mommy Kissing Santa Claus" b/w "Ebenezer Scrooge"	—	—	—	Non-album tracks
1953	"I Just Can't Wait Till Christmas" b/w "Too Fat for the Chimney"	—	—	—	Non-album tracks
1954	"Jilted" b/w "Le Grand Tour de L'Amour" (from Teresa Brewer)	6	11	—	Miss Music
1954	"Skinnie Minnie (Fish Tail)" b/w "I Had Someone Else Before I Had You" (from A Bouquet of Hits, 10-inch LP)	22	26	—	Miss Music
1954	"Au Revoir" b/w "Danger Signs"	—	31	—	Miss Music
1954	"Time" b/w "My Sweetie Went Away" (from A Bouquet of Hits, 10-inch LP)	—	43	—	Non-album tracks
1954	"Let Me Go, Lover" b/w "The Moon Is On Fire" (Non-album track)	6	—	9	Teresa
1955	"I Gotta Go Get My Baby" b/w "What More Is There to Say" (Non-album track)	—	21	—	Teresa
1955	"Pledging My Love" /	17	11	—	Teresa
1955	"How Important Can It Be?"	Flip	—	—	Non-album tracks
1955	"Tweedle Dee" b/w "Rock Love" (from Miss Music)	—	—	—	Non-album tracks
1955	"Silver Dollar" b/w "I Don't Want to Be Lonely Tonight" (from Teresa Brewer)	20	27	—	Teresa
1955	"The Banjo's Back in Town" b/w "How to Be Very, Very Popular" (Non-album track)	15	24	—	Teresa
1955	"Baby Be My Toy" b/w "So Doggone Lonely" (Non-album track)	—	—	—	Miss Music
1955	"Shoot It Again" b/w "You're Telling Our Secrets" (from Teresa Brewer)	66	39	—	Non-album track
1956	"A Good Man Is Hard to Find" b/w "It's Siesta Time" (from Teresa Brewer)	—	39	—	Music Music Music (Coral)
1956	"A Tear Fell" /	5	7	2	Teresa
1956	"Bo Weevil"	17	19	—	Teresa
1956	"A Sweet Old Fashioned Girl" b/w "Goodbye, John"	7	11	3	Teresa
1956	"I Love Mickey" (with Mickey Mantle) b/w "Keep Your Cotton Pickin' Paddies Offa My Heart" (from Teresa Brewer)	87	50	—	Miss Music
1956	"Mutual Admiration Society" /	21	24	—	Miss Music
1956	"Crazy with Love"	73	—	—	Miss Music
1957	"I'm Drowning My Sorrows" /	—	40	—	Non-album track
1957	"How Lonely Can One Be"	—	49	—	Miss Music
1957	"Empty Arms" b/w "The Ricky-Tick Song" (from For Teenagers in Love)	13	17	—	Miss Music
1957	"Teardrops in My Heart" b/w "Lula Rock-a-Hula" (Note: Teardrops in My Heart peaked at number 13 on the Canadian CHUM Chart.)	64	40	—	For Teenagers in Love
1957	"It's the Same Old Jazz" b/w "Born to Love"	—	—	—	For Teenagers in Love
1957	"You Send Me" b/w "Would I Were"	8	1	—	Time for Teresa
1957	"Nora Malone" b/w "When I Leave the World Behind"	—	—	26	Music Music Music (Coral)
1957	"Listen My Children" b/w "Hush-a-Bye, Wink-a-Bye"	—	—	—	At Christmas Time
1958	"Lost a Little Puppy" b/w "Because Him Is a Baby"	—	—	—	At Christmas Time
1958	"Whirlpool" b/w "There's Nothing as Lonesome as Saturday Night"	—	—	—	Teresa Brewer
1958	"Saturday Dance" b/w "I Think the World of You" (from Time for Teresa)	—	—	—	Heavenly Lover
1958	"Pickle Up a Doodle" b/w "The Rain Falls on Everybody"	99	—	—	Heavenly Lover
1958	"The Hula Hoop Song" b/w "So Shy" (from For Teenagers in Love)	38	37	—	Heavenly Lover
1958	"Jingle Bell Rock" b/w "I Like Christmas" (Non-album track)	—	—	—	The Best of Teresa Brewer
1959	"The One Rose (That's Left in My Heart)" b/w "Satellite"	75	67	—	Heavenly Lover
1959	"Heavenly Lover" b/w "Fair Weather Sweetheart"	40	44	—	Heavenly Lover
1959	"Bye Bye Bye Baby Goodbye" b/w "Chain of Friendship"	115	99	—	Heavenly Lover
1959	"Mexicali Rose" b/w "If You Like-a-Me" (Non-album track)	—	—	—	Songs Everybody Knows
1960	"Peace of Mind" b/w "Venetian Sunset" (Non-album track)	66	81	—	My Golden Favorites
1960	"Anymore" b/w "That Piano Man" (Non-album track) (Note: Anymore peaked at number 3 on the Canadian CHUM Chart.)	31	24	—	Songs Everybody Knows
1960	"Have You Ever Been Lonely (Have You Ever Been Blue)" b/w "When Do You Love Me"	84	120	—	Songs Everybody Knows
1960	"How Do You Know It's Love" b/w "If There Are Stars in My Eyes"	—	—	21	Non-album tracks
1961	"Older and Wiser" /	—	136	—	Non-album tracks
1961	"Whip-poor-will"	—	131	—	Non-album tracks
1961	"Milord" b/w "I've Got My Fingers Crossed"	74	105	—	The Best of Teresa Brewer
1961	"Little Miss Belong to No One" b/w "Sea Shell" (from Aloha from Teresa)	—	111	—	Non-album tracks
1961	"Step Right Up" b/w "Pretty Lookin' Boy"	—	—	—	Non-album tracks
1962	"Another" b/w "I Want You to Worry"	—	—	—	Non-album tracks
1962	"One Heart Less to Break" b/w "You Came a Long Way from St. Louis" (from Don't Mess with Tess)	—	—	—	Non-album tracks
1962	"The Ballad of Lover's Hill" b/w "Not Like a Sister" (from Terrific Teresa Brewer)	—	118	—	Non-album track
1963	"She'll Never, Never Love You (Like I Do)" b/w "The Thrill Is Gone"	122	113	—	Terrific Teresa Brewer
1963	"Second Hand Rose" b/w "Stand-In"	—	—	—	Terrific Teresa Brewer
1963	"He Understands Me" b/w "Just Before We Say Goodbye" (Non-album track)	130	145	—	Terrific Teresa Brewer
1964	"I Hear the Angels Singing" b/w "Cry Baby"	—	—	—	Non-album tracks
1964	"Come On In" b/w "Simple Things"	—	—	—	Non-album tracks
1964	"Dang Me" b/w "Mama Never Told Me" (Non-album track)	—	—	—	Golden Hits of 1964
1965	"Goldfinger" b/w "Make Room for One More Fool" (Non-album track)	—	—	—	Goldfinger, Dear Heart & Other Great Movie Songs
1965	"Supercalifragilisticexpialidocious" b/w "I've Grown Accustomed to His Face"	—	—	—	Goldfinger, Dear Heart & Other Great Movie Songs
1965	"What About Mine" b/w "Say Something Sweet to Your Sweetheart"	—	—	—	Non-album tracks
1965	"Little Buddy" b/w "Little Bitty Grain of Sand" (Non-album track)	—	—	—	Songs for Our Fighting Men
1966	"Handle with Care" b/w "I Can't Remember (Ever Loving You)"	—	—	—	Non-album tracks
1966	"Evil on Your Mind" b/w "Ain't Had No Lovin'"	—	—	—	Gold Country
1967	"Thoroughly Modern Millie" b/w "Jimmy"	—	—	—	Non-album tracks
1968	"Step to the Rea" b/w "Live a Little"	—	—	—	Non-album tracks
1968	"A Woman's World" b/w "Ride-a-Roo"	—	—	—	Non-album tracks
1972	"Somewhere There's Someone Who Loves You" b/w "Day by Day"	—	—	—	Non-album tracks
1973	"A Simple Song" b/w "Singin' a Doo Dah Song"	—	—	—	Singin' a Doo Dah Song
1973	"Music! Music! Music!" (rock version) b/w "School Days" (Note: Music! Music! Music! reached number 84 on the Canadian RPM charts, September 8, 1973.)	109	112	—	Teresa Brewer in London
1973	"Another Useless Day" b/w "Music To The Man"	—	—	—	Music Music Music (Flying Dutchman)
1974	"Bo Weevil" b/w "Bei Mir Bist Du Schon (Means That You're Grand)" (from Music Music Music (Flying Dutchman))	—	—	—	Non-album tracks
1974	"Gatsby's" b/w "What'll I Do"	—	—	—	Non-album tracks
1974	"Am I Asking Too Much of You" b/w "Willie Burgundy"	—	—	—	Non-album tracks
1975	"Unliberated Woman" b/w "Good Lovin' You"	—	—	—	Unliberated Woman
1976	"Music Music Music" (Disco Version) b/w "Where Did the Good Times Go"	—	—	—	Non-album tracks
1979	"Some Songs" b/w "A Natural Feelin' for You"	—	—	—	Non-album tracks
1981	"Come Follow the Band" b/w "The Colors of My Life"	—	—	—	Come Follow the Band
1983	"Jimmy Dorsey Medley" b/w "Classic Medley #1"	—	—	—	Non-album tracks
1983	"No Way Conway" b/w "Sittin' Here Cryin'"	—	—	—	Non-album tracks
