= The Thing (song) =

1950 American novelty song by Charles Randolph Grean

Single by Phil Harris
- B-side: "The Mountaineer And The Jabberwock"
- Released: October 13, 1950
- Genre: Novelty
- Length: 2:17
- Label: RCA Victor
- Songwriter: Charles Randolph Grean

"The Thing" is a novelty song by Charles Randolph Grean released in 1950. The song received heavy airplay, spending 14 weeks on the Billboard charts. The melody is derived from the English bawdy folk song "The Chandler's Wife", which itself derived its melody from the earlier English folk song "The Lincolnshire Poacher".

The song was recorded by Phil Harris and released on October 13, 1950, as a 78 rpm by RCA Victor, #20-3968. The record first scored the Billboard chart on November 17, 1950, eventually peaking at number one during its several-month stay.

== Story ==
The lyrics are of a first-person narration, describing the discovery on a beach of a large wooden box that is floating in the bay, which the narrator pulls out of the water. Whatever is in the box is never revealed, nor is it called "The Thing" in the lyrics. When the lyrics call for The Thing to be named, the vocals simply pause for three percussive knocks. For example, the first verse ends, "I discovered a [* **], right before my eyes!" The knocks are spaced unequally, occurring on counts 1, 3, and 4 of the song's 6/8 meter. The listener could substitute any three-syllable word or phrase their imagination might suggest that stresses its first and third syllables.

The narrator is overjoyed by this discovery, which repels seemingly everyone else in this world (and the next). He takes the box into a pawnshop in his neighborhood, hoping to sell it, but is rejected by the proprietor with a threat to call the police. "Running for [his] life", the narrator takes the box home to his wife, who also rejects him—and orders him never to return. Next, the narrator offers the box to a hobo, receiving first his assurance that he'll take "most any old thing", as he is desperate; when the homeless man sees what's in the box, he runs away. The hapless narrator proceeds through the rest of his life unable to rid himself of The Thing, until he dies and arrives at the gates of Heaven, still with the box, only to be ordered by Saint Peter to "take it down below". The song closes with the narrator's warning not to open a tempting box found on the beach as he did, or "you'll never get rid of the [* **], no matter whatcha do!".

== Covers ==
Other versions were recorded by Arthur Godfrey, The Ames Brothers, Danny Kaye, Kidsongs, Ray Charles, Teresa Brewer, Adam West, and Australian orchestra leader Les Welch. The Arthur Godfrey recording was made during November 1950 and released by Columbia Records as catalog number 39068. The Danny Kaye recording was made on December 1, 1950, and released by Decca Records as catalog number 27350. The Ray Charles recording was made on July 13, 1963, and released by ABC-Paramount Records on the album Have a Smile with Me, as catalog number ABC 495 (mono) / ABCS 495 (stereo). The Teresa Brewer recording was made during October 1950, and released by London Records as catalog number 873. The Les Welch recording was made during January 1951 and released by Pacific Records, an Australian company, as catalog number 10-0051. Bill Buchanan recorded a cover version, which featured his voice sounding like a chipmunk in a fast track vocal.

== Appearances in media ==
=== Film ===
The song was broadcast by radio concurrently with a series of teaser advertisements published weekly in Collier's magazine promoting Howard Hawks' science fiction movie The Thing from Another World (released April 6, 1951).

Harris performed the song in the movie The Wild Blue Yonder (1951).

A portion of the Phil Harris version plays during the indoor swimming pool scene in the Peter Bogdanovich movie The Last Picture Show (1971).

=== Television ===
During the song's time on the Billboard charts, it was played many times on Your Hit Parade. At the end of one of the song's performances, the words "Income Tax" blinked to the song's rhythm, jokingly referring to its longevity on the charts.

The song was played by Richie's babysitter in the Dick Van Dyke Show episode "The Lady and the Babysitter".

=== Radio ===
Phil Harris's recording is referenced in the December 22, 1950, episode of The Adventures of Sam Spade titled "The Caper Concerning the Thing." As in the song, the audience never learns the contents of the mysterious box. The episode ends with a call for folks to support Harris's holiday toy drive, "The Thing for Kids for Christmas".

=== In science fiction ===
Edward G. Robles Jr. wrote a science fiction short story based partially on the song. It involved several homeless men who find an item like the one described by the song. In the story, the item is discovered to be an alien disguised as something nobody wants. It was originally copyrighted by Galaxy Publishing Corp. in 1954.

=== Pinball ===
Chicago Coin released pinball table Thing in 1951 with backglass and playfield art inspired by the song, illustrated by Roy Parker.

== See also ==
- "The Marvelous Toy"

Preceded by "Harbor Lights" by Sammy Kaye	U.S. Billboard Best Sellers in Stores number-one single December 2–23, 1950	Succeeded by "The Tennessee Waltz" by Patti Page
Preceded by "Harbor Lights" by Sammy Kaye	Cash Box Best Sellers number-one song December 16, 1950	Succeeded by "Harbor Lights" by Sammy Kaye
