= Bell Bottom Blues (Leon Carr and Hal David song) =

Leon Carr and Hal David song

Single by Teresa Brewer
- A-side: "Our Heartbreaking Waltz"
- Released: 1953
- Genre: Pop
- Length: 2:32
- Label: Coral
- Songwriters: Leon Carr; Hal David

"Bell Bottom Blues" is a popular song, with music was written by Leon Carr, and the lyrics by Hal David. The song was published in 1953.

== First recordings ==
- The biggest hit version in the United States was recorded by Teresa Brewer. Her recording was made on February 19, 1953, and released by Coral Records as catalog number 61066. It first reached the Billboard chart on February 13, 1954, and lasted three weeks on the chart, peaking at number 17.
- In the United Kingdom, the song was a hit for Alma Cogan. Her recording was released in 1954 by His Master's Voice as catalog numbers 7M 188 (45 rpm) and B10653 (78 rpm). It reached number 4 on the UK Singles Chart. The B-side was "Love Me Again".
