= Kenny Bass =

American polka artist

Kenny Bass (1922 – 1987), born Peter Bastasic Jr., was an influential member of Cleveland-Style polka broadcasters and frontman of the band Kenny Bass Polka Poppers Orchestra. He served in the U.S. Navy as a radio man in the Pacific. He was awarded three Battle Stars and a Purple Heart. He started his broadcasting career in 1948 on station WSRS. His show was America’s first daily polka show.

== Bands ==
From 1945 until 1950, he was a member of the Habat-Sokach "Tune Mixers". He formed the Polka Poppers in 1950, which was a popular polka recording orchestras. They made 17 albums and around 200 singles. They had their own television shows in 1954 and 1960 and had guest appearances on Polka Varieties, and the Old Dutch Polka Revue. The Kenny Bass Orchestra was in the film One Potato, Two Potato in 1962.

His albums include: Polka Lovers' Time, Toe Tappin' Polkas, Snap Happy Polkas, Polka!Polka!Polka!, and It’s Happy Polka Time.

== Honors ==
He was the recipient of the National Cleveland Style Polka Hall of Fame Lifetime Achievement Award in 1989.
