= Bo Weevil =

Single by Fats Domino

from the album Rock and Rollin' with Fats Domino
- B-side: "Don't Blame It on Me"
- Released: January 1956
- Recorded: October 15, 1955
- Genre: Rhythm and blues
- Length: 2:02
- Label: Imperial
- Songwriters: Dave Bartholomew, Antoine Domino

Fats Domino singles chronology
"Poor Me" (1955)	"Bo Weevil" (1956)	"I'm in Love Again" (1956)

"Bo Weevil" is a song written by Dave Bartholomew and Fats Domino, recorded by Domino on October 15, 1955. Imperial Records released it as a single in January 1956, which peaked at number 35 on the Billboard Hot 100 chart and number 5 on its R&B chart in February 1956. The song is included on his 1956 album, Rock and Rollin' with Fats Domino.

== Alternate versions ==
In 1991, two new versions of the song performed by Fats Domino were released: the so-called "complete" (length 2:45), on the soundtrack of the film A Rage in Harlem, and the "alternative" (1:50), on the 4-CD box set "They Call Me The Fat Man...". The "complete" version was also included in the 1993 Fats Domino box set Out of New Orleans. However, these alternate versions are simply composite edits of the original recording, the shortest of the three (1:50), which was considered as alternative by Fats Domino fans. The first minute of this original recording (after a two-second intro) was repeated twice to produce a composite master for the single and album (2:02). The long so-called "complete" version is a triple repetition of the same first minute with a fade-out at the end.
