= Coral Records =

American record company

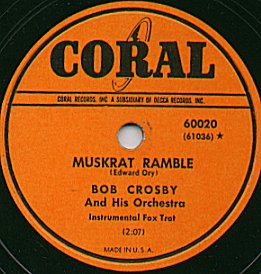
- Parent company: Decca Records
- Founded: 1949
- Genre: Pop, rock, jazz
- Country of origin: U.S.
- Location: New York City

Coral Records was a subsidiary of Decca Records that was formed in 1949. Coral released music by Patsy Cline, Buddy Holly, the McGuire Sisters and Teresa Brewer.

Coral was started by Decca in 1949 as a subsidiary that initially focused on jazz and swing material but after Bob Thiele took over the label in 1954, he shifted to mainstream pop and rock acts such as Buddy Holly, the McGuire Sisters, Johnny Desmond, Eileen Barton, Jackie Wilson, Lawrence Welk, and Steve Lawrence that did not fit the main Decca label's classier, upmarket image. He also produced hit songs by his future wife, Teresa Brewer.

Coral stopped issuing new material in 1971. In 1973, MCA amalgamated Decca, Kapp Records, and Uni Records under the single MCA Records banner, and Coral was repositioned as a mid-line and budget album reissue label in the U.S. and internationally. That version of Coral (MCA Coral) lasted into the 1980s. Some product from MCA's former Vocalion Records budget label was manufactured with MCA Coral labels that bore Vocalion catalog numbers and was shipped in sleeves still bearing the Vocalion trademark, presumably to cut costs.

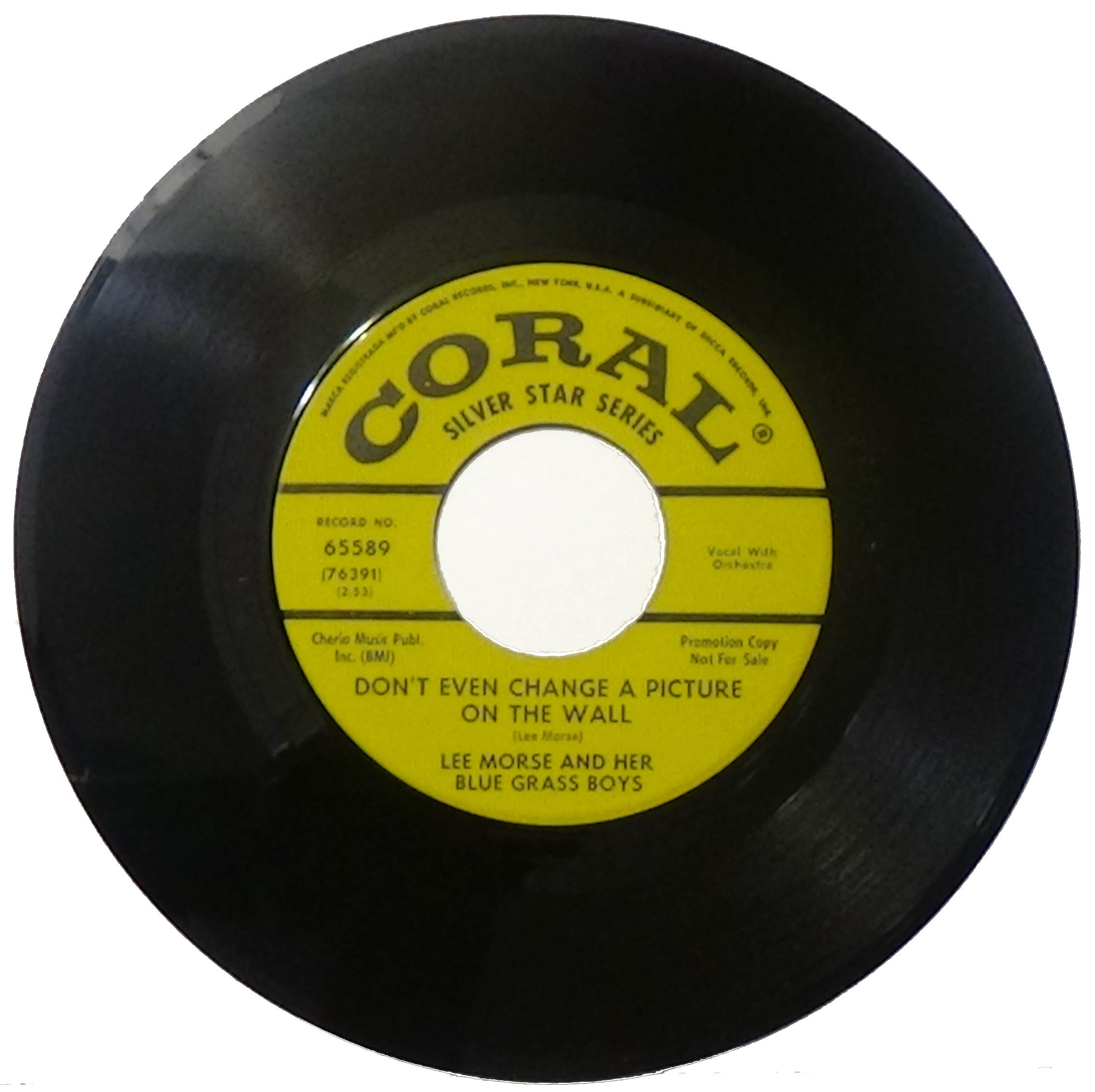
45 rpm Coral.

== Roster ==
- Steve Allen
- Ames Brothers
- Louis Armstrong
- Two Ton Baker
- Kenny Bass and His Polka Poppers
- Milton Berle
- Owen Bradley
- Teresa Brewer
- Doug Bragg
- Paul Bruno
- Johnny Burnette Trio
- Champ Butler
- George Cates
- Patsy Cline
- Rosemary Clooney
- Al Cohn
- Dorothy Collins
- Don Cornell
- Eddie Costa
- Bob Crosby
- Jimmy Dorsey
- Pete Fountain
- Georgia Gibbs
- Charlie Gracie
- Lou Graham
- Buddy Greco
- Eddie Gronet and His Orchestra
- Greg Hatza
- Woody Herman
- Milt Herth
- Buddy Holly
- Will Holt
- Steve Lawrence
- Lennon Sisters
- Liberace
- McGuire Sisters
- Betty Madigan
- Peggy Mann
- Barbara McNair
- The Modernaires
- Moon Mullican
- Debbie Reynolds
- Raymond Scott
- Jack Shook
- John Serry
- Frank Sorrell
- Gino Tonetti
- Tony and the Bandits
- Jackie Verdell
- Claudio Villa
- The Vogues
- Romance Watson (of the Roberta Martin Singers)
- Lawrence Welk
- Paul Whiteman and his "New" Ambassador Orchestra
- Lee Wiley
- Billy Williams
- Frank York and His Orchestra

== See also ==
- List of record labels
