= Tinetti =

Tinetti is a surname. Notable people with the surname include:

- Giovanna Tinetti (born 1972), Italian physicist
- Jan Tinetti (born 1968), New Zealand politician
- Mary Tinetti, American physician

== See also ==
- Tonetti
