= Temple of Hadrian =

Ancient religious monument in Rome, Italy

- Templum Divi Hadriani (Latin)
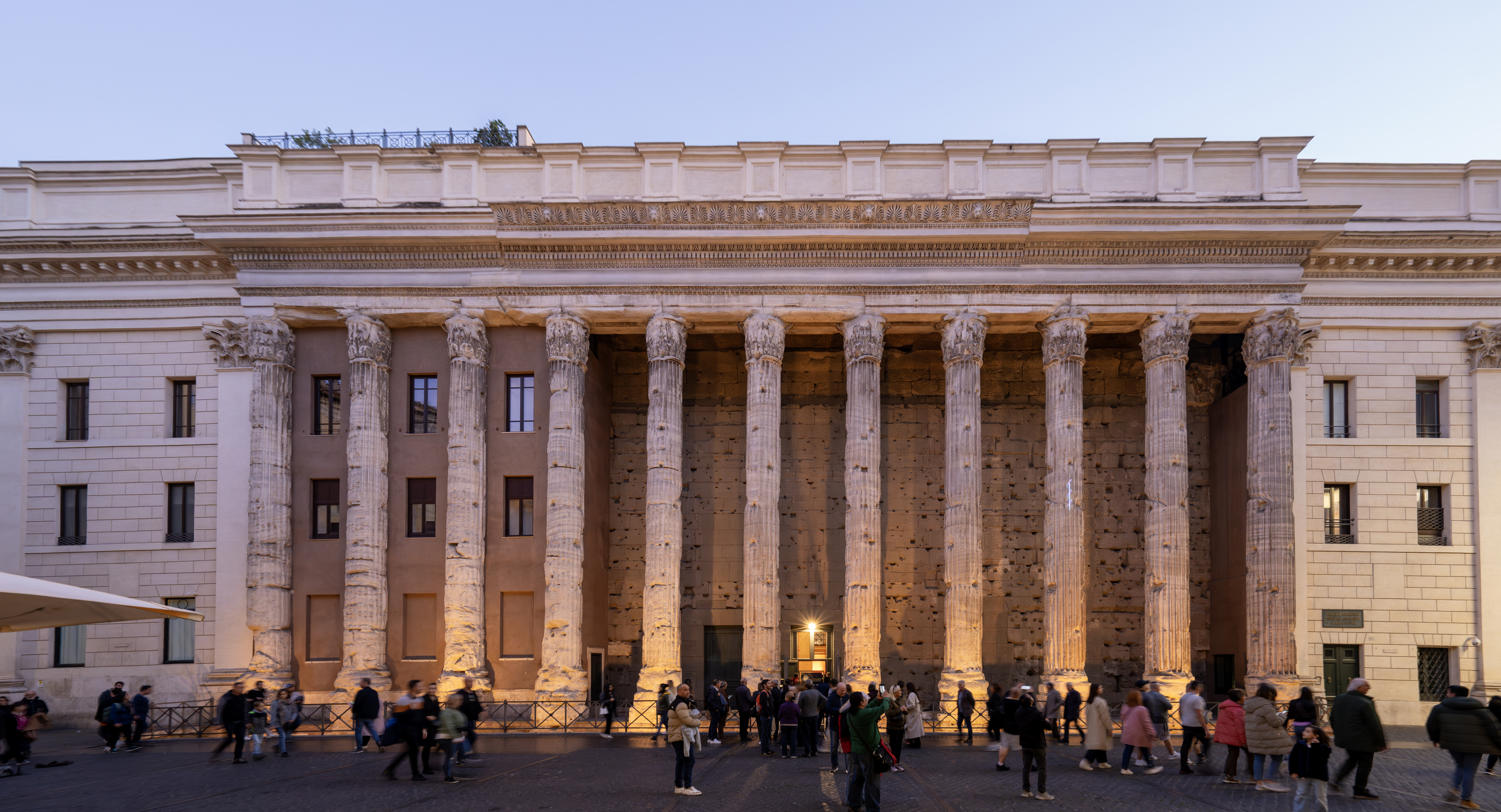
- A surviving side colonnade of the Temple of Hadrian.

- Shown within Augustan Rome
- Interactive map of Temple of Hadrian
- 41°53′59″N 12°28′46″E
- Location: Rome, Italy

History
- Built: 145 CE
- Built by: Antoninus Pius

Site notes
- Area: Campus Martius
- Governing body: Chamber of Commerce of Rome

The Temple of Hadrian (Templum Divus Hadrianus, also Hadrianeum) is an ancient Roman structure on the Campus Martius in Rome, Italy, dedicated to the deified emperor Hadrian by his adoptive son and successor Antoninus Pius in 145 CE. This temple was previously known as the Basilica of Neptune but has since been properly attributed as the Temple of Hadrian completed under Antoninus Pius. With one cella wall and eleven columns from the external colonnade surviving, the remains of the temple have been incorporated into a later building in the Piazza di Pietra (Piazza of Stone – derived from use of the temple's stones to build the piazza), whereby its facade, alongside the architrave which was reconstructed later on, was incorporated into a 17th-century papal palace by Carlo Fontana, now occupied by Rome's Chamber of commerce. While only part of the structure remains, excavations and scholarship have provided us with information regarding its construction techniques and stylistic influences, helping us recreate the building dynamics and significance of the Temple of Hadrian in Imperial Rome.

== History ==
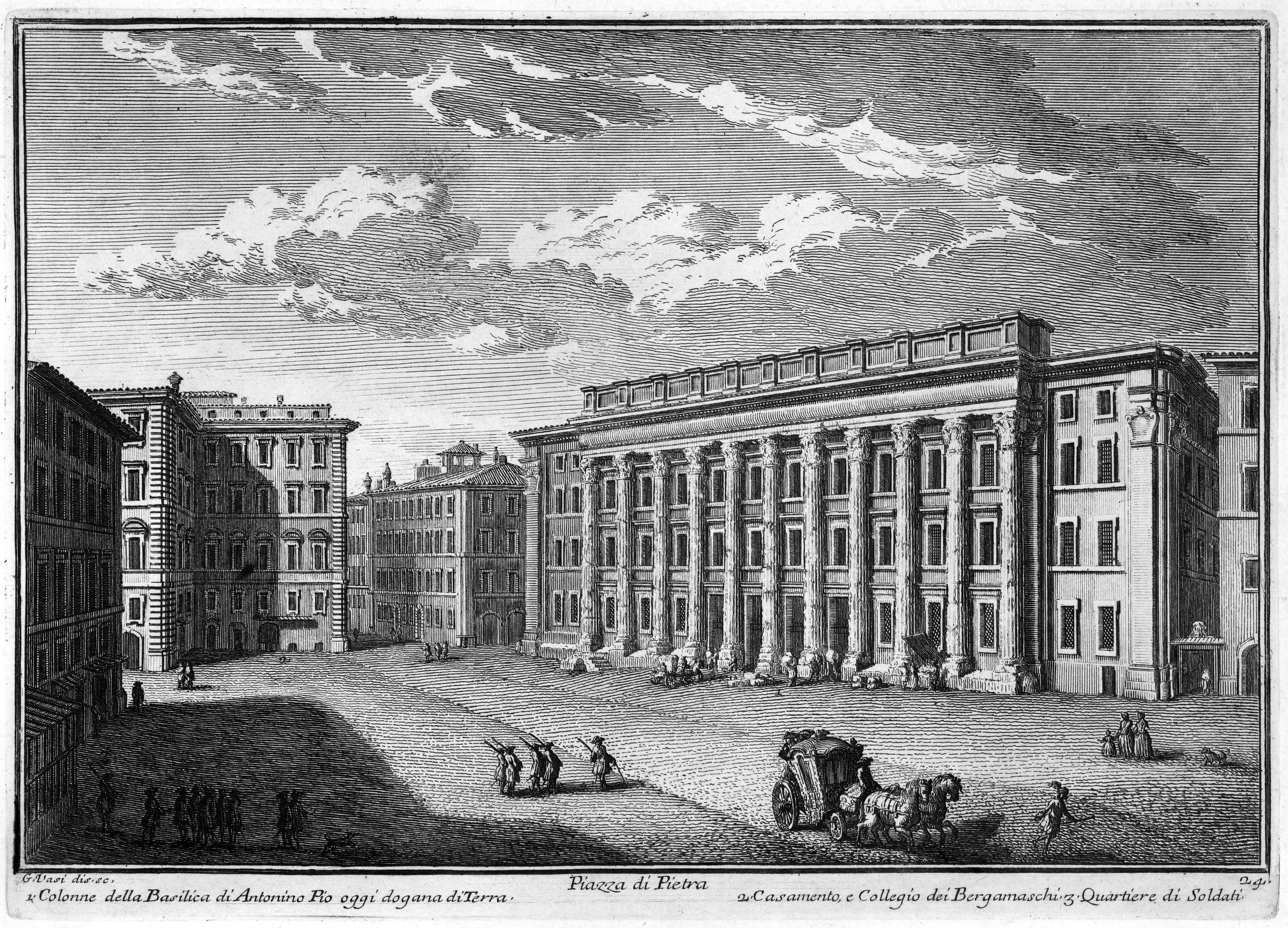
Drawing of the Temple by Giuseppe Vasi, c. 1750

The emperor Hadrian died in 138 C.E. and his successor Antoninus Pius dedicated this temple in his name almost a decade later in 145 C.E. Although there is no surviving inscription to identify it as a temple to Hadrian, there was an inscription dedicated to him by his successor Antoninus Pius which was listed in the Regionary Catalogues amidst other Hadrianic dynastic monuments between the Pantheon and the Via del Corso.

There was apparently another major temple precinct located to the west, perhaps of Matidia and Marciana, Hadrian's mother-in-law and her mother, Trajan's elder sister, both of whom were also deified after their deaths.

Antoninus Pius' reign may not have seen major stylistic innovations in the architectural programs at Rome, but he did see to the completion of buildings begun or intended by his late predecessor Hadrian.

== Location ==
The Temple of Deified Hadrian was located within the Campus Martius (The Field of Mars) in close proximity to the earlier Solarium Augusti and later constructed Column of Marcus Aurelius. In the Notitia it is also listed as located in Regio IX near the Baths of Alexander Severus and Agrippa. The temple of Matidia (Hadrian's mother-in-law) also likely stood just to the west of the Temple of Hadrian so it has further been argued for the presence of monumental entrances at both ends of the temple though the remains offer no confirmation. The temple itself also stood within a spacious precinct surrounded by a colonnade, parts of which were uncovered by Rodolfo Lanciani in his early excavations of the surrounding spaces.

== Architecture ==
=== Remains ===
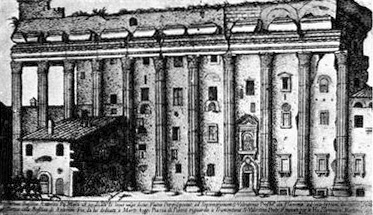
Alo Giovannoli's 1615 drawing of the temple

Long ago both ends of the temple, as well as the other side, disappeared; all that remains are eleven fluted columns with Corinthian bases and capitals, as well as one side of the cella wall which was built into a nineteenth century palazzo that continues to house the Rome Borsa.

While the lower part of the original richly carved entablature survives, the rest was recorded in sixteenth-century drawings. In modern times, the entablature was largely repaired in stucco with the cornice so poorly restored that three different versions exist with only the central one resembling the original.

Traces of vaulting beneath the front steps also demonstrate that the temple originally faced East (towards the Corso) and likely had eight columns across the front, with thirteen down either side of the structure. These traces also consist of surviving remains of clamps which suggest pilasters were joined to the colonnade.

=== Excavations ===
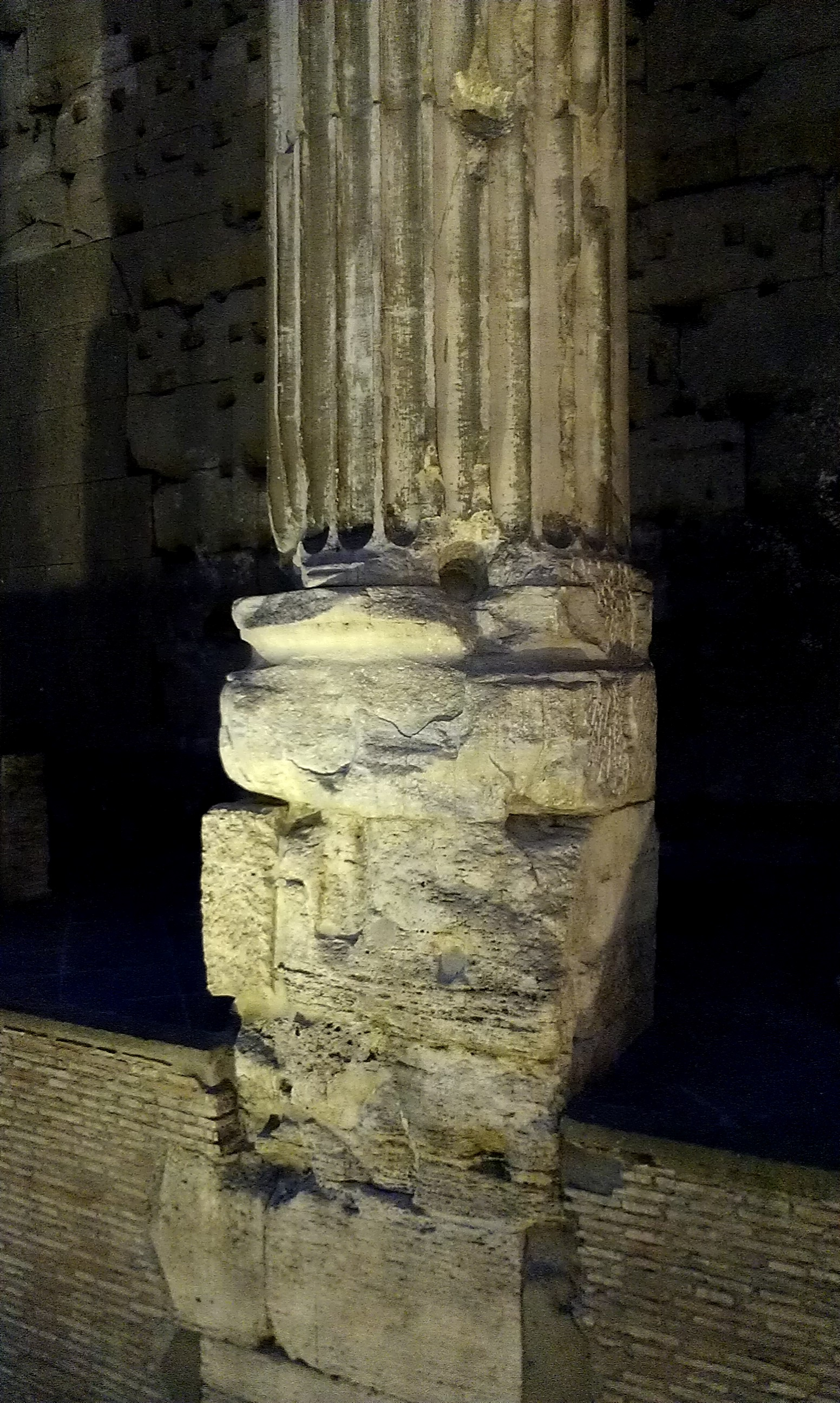
Detail of pillar

Excavations began in 1878 and recent explorations in the cellars of the buildings on other sides of Piazza di Pietra identified line of a monumental enclosure wall, with large curving exedra at the back. The front of colonnade behind the railing was also thoroughly excavated which exposed original ground level of temple precinct, 5 m below present square and flank of high podium faced with white marble to match columns above.

=== Building materials ===
- Proconnesian marble is employed distinctively with grey and white horizontal bands for the Corinthian order columns measuring 1.44 m in diameter and 14.8 m high. This marble type came from northwestern Turkey and does not really appear in Rome until the end of Hadrian's reign, and is widely employed by the Severans.
- Peperino tufa (podium faced with matching white marble) was used for the cella wall that features behind the colonnade. Blocks of peperino were left rough, presumably to be covered with marble revetment.
- Some of the fluted columns of the surrounding colonnade were also of giallo antico, a coloured marble also known as Numidian yellow from Tunisia that was used for columns, paving and veneer.

=== Construction techniques ===
The interior of the squarish cella was lined with engaged order and had a coffered concrete barrel vault ceiling with clear settings for a lining in plates of marble which survives inside Borsa building.

== Design ==
Overall, the temple was presumed to have been octastyle, elevated on a typical Roman high podium, peripteral in style and likely approached by stairs covering the eastern end with a deep pronaos of three bays. During Hadrian's reign, the peripteral style of temple came briefly back into fashion at Rome, and was also used in the Temple of Venus and Roma. Also like the Temple of Venus and Roma, the Temple of Hadrian consists of a two-stepped architrave and cornice profile that is supported by plain consoles instead of modillions, a sima with a similar arrangement of palmettes and lions' heads (argued by Frank Sear to have been the work of the same architects), but a frieze which is pulvinated so not exactly the same structural design that we see in the Temple of Venus and Roma. An anonymous drawing alongside some fragmentary remains from the site indicate that the architrave was worked with garlands hung in swags and the frieze consisted of serpentine design of acanthus candelabra between reversing S-spirals.

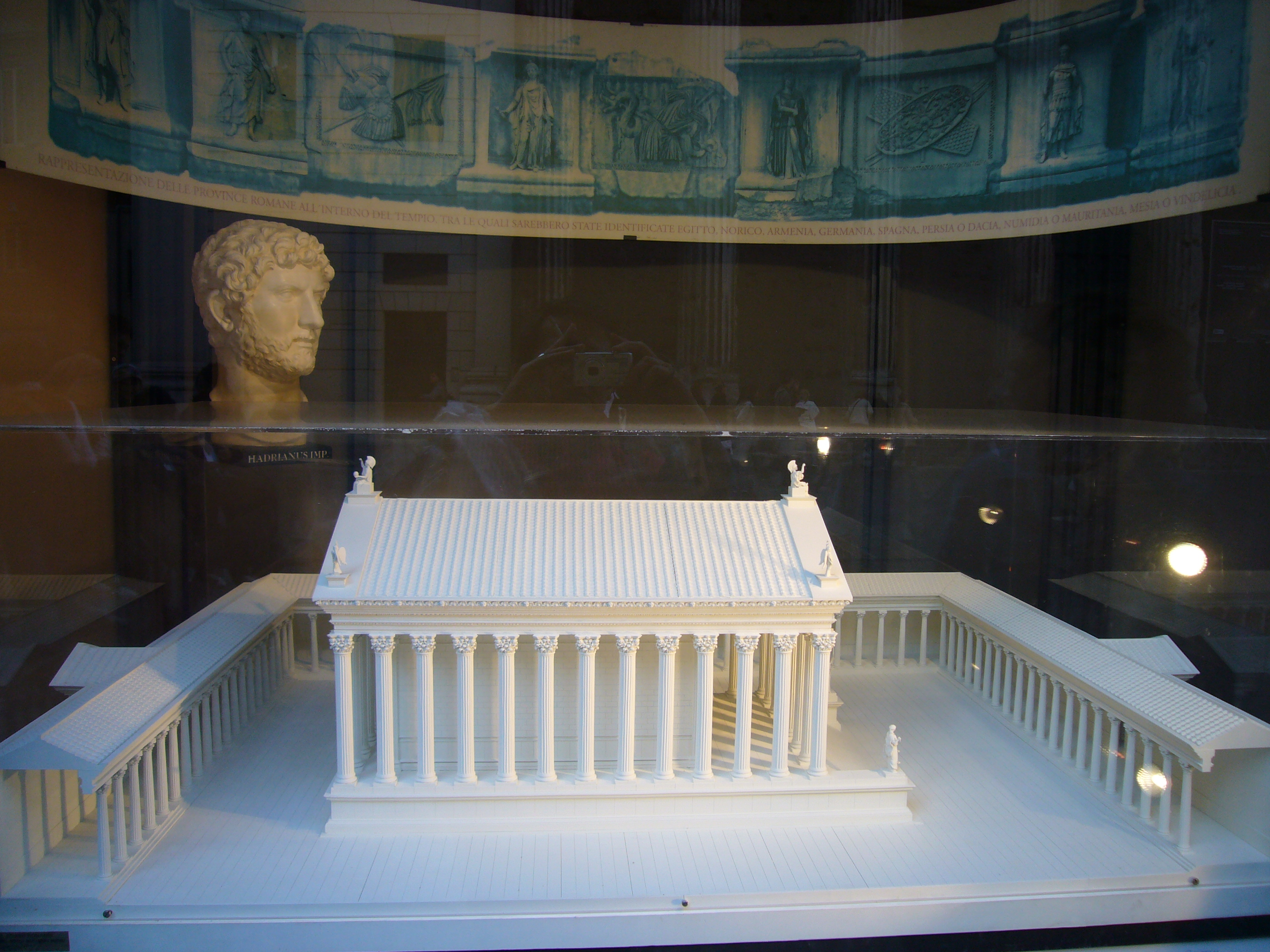
Reconstruction

Inside the bank the remains of the non-apsidal naos can be seen, once covered by a barrel vault supported on columns between which were battle-trophies. The base of the columns had reliefs of personifications of the provinces of the empire (some of which are now in the National Roman Museum and Capitoline Museums), demonstrating Hadrian's less warlike policy than his predecessor Trajan.

As one of Antoninus Pius' earlier building projects undertaken, the Temple of Hadrian resembles other design features we see with late Hadrianic architecture, such as the rejection of the orthodox Corinthian Order and notable stylistic transitions such as Asiatic illustrating Pergamene influence with rich ornamentation and other more eclectic features.

Moreover, it has been argued given the remains and earlier renditions of the temple that nearly every surface was decorated, whether with intricate Asiatic designs, or engaged orders and pilasters surrounding the interior of the cella.

The temple also had a large square arcade surrounded by columns in giallo antico and which opened onto the Via Lata (now the Via del Corso) through a triumphal arch. This arch has been identified as the one called the "arch of Antoninus" in later sources, but has also been called the "arch of Claudius" and the "arch of the Tosetti", from the name of the family that inhabited Piazza Sciarra (now disappeared due to road-widening of the Via del Corso). Despite having fallen into ruin and been demolished, the arch still gave its name in the 18th century to the 'Via dell'Archetto'.

=== The "Province" reliefs ===
A series of marble pedestals and panels (24 in total so far) were found in proximity to the temple of Hadrian and have thus been thought to have formed a part of its decorative program. According to Richardson, the face of the temple podium was broken into panels, whereby vertical plinths beneath the columns illustrated allegorical figures of the provinces of the empire in high relief, while framed panels under the intercolumniations bore simple trophies of armor and weapons but at a grander size. Sixteen of the figures of provinces remain well preserved and are housed between five different collections in Rome and Naples. They were carved in relief with personifications of cities and peoples from the Roman Empire, alternating with military and naval trophies. The building materials employed were Proconnesian marble compatible with the order of the temple. However, it is still debated whether or not those remains are directly from the Temple of Hadrian, or from other large public buildings that surrounded it. Moreover, debate continues in regards to the identification of provinces that are illustrated as some argue that there were originally 25 in order to account for various personifications appearing on the coinage of Antoninus Pius, distinguishable for their costume and weapons.

- Capitoline Museums:
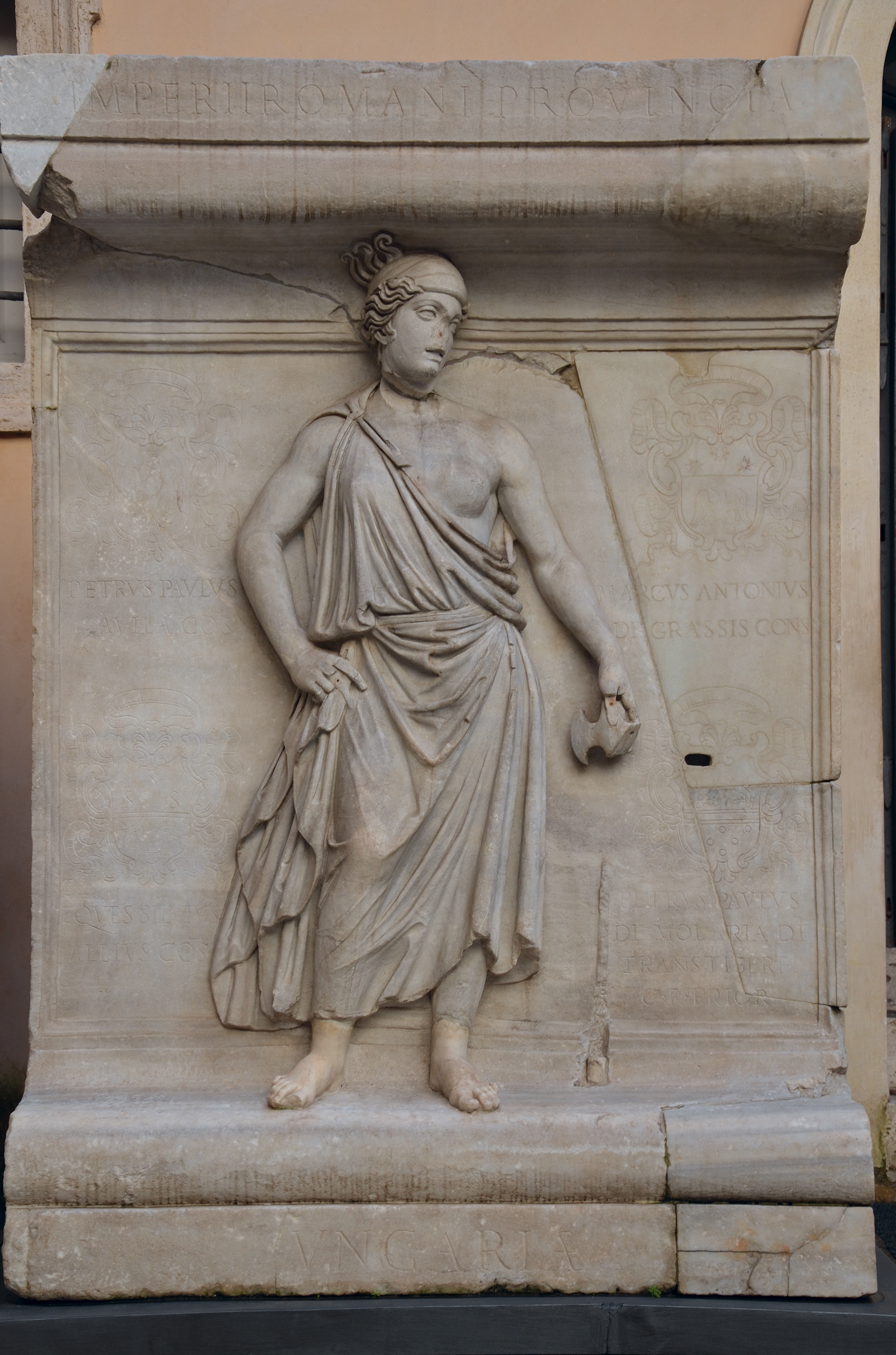
Moesia or Thrace

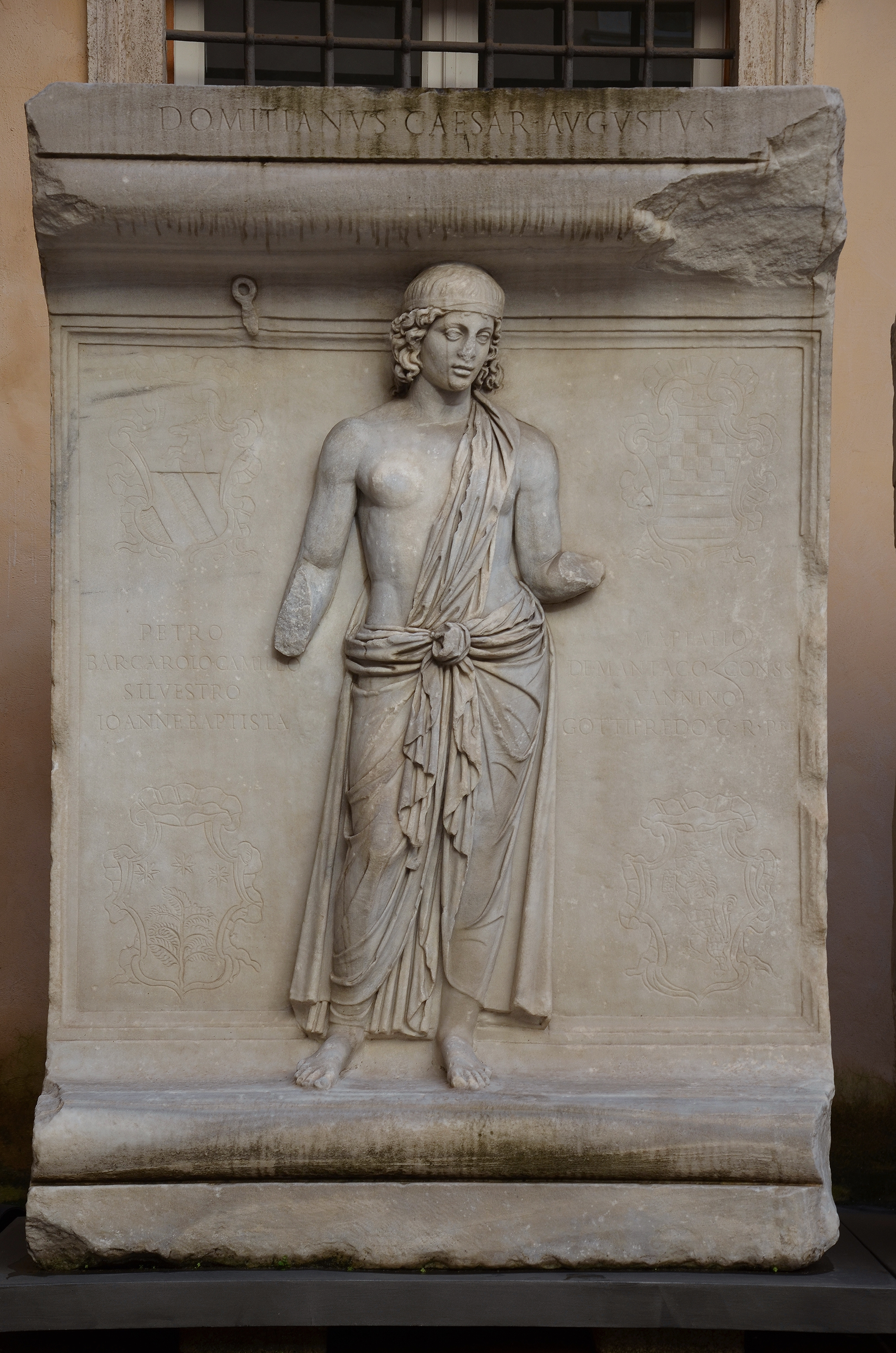
Achaea (?)

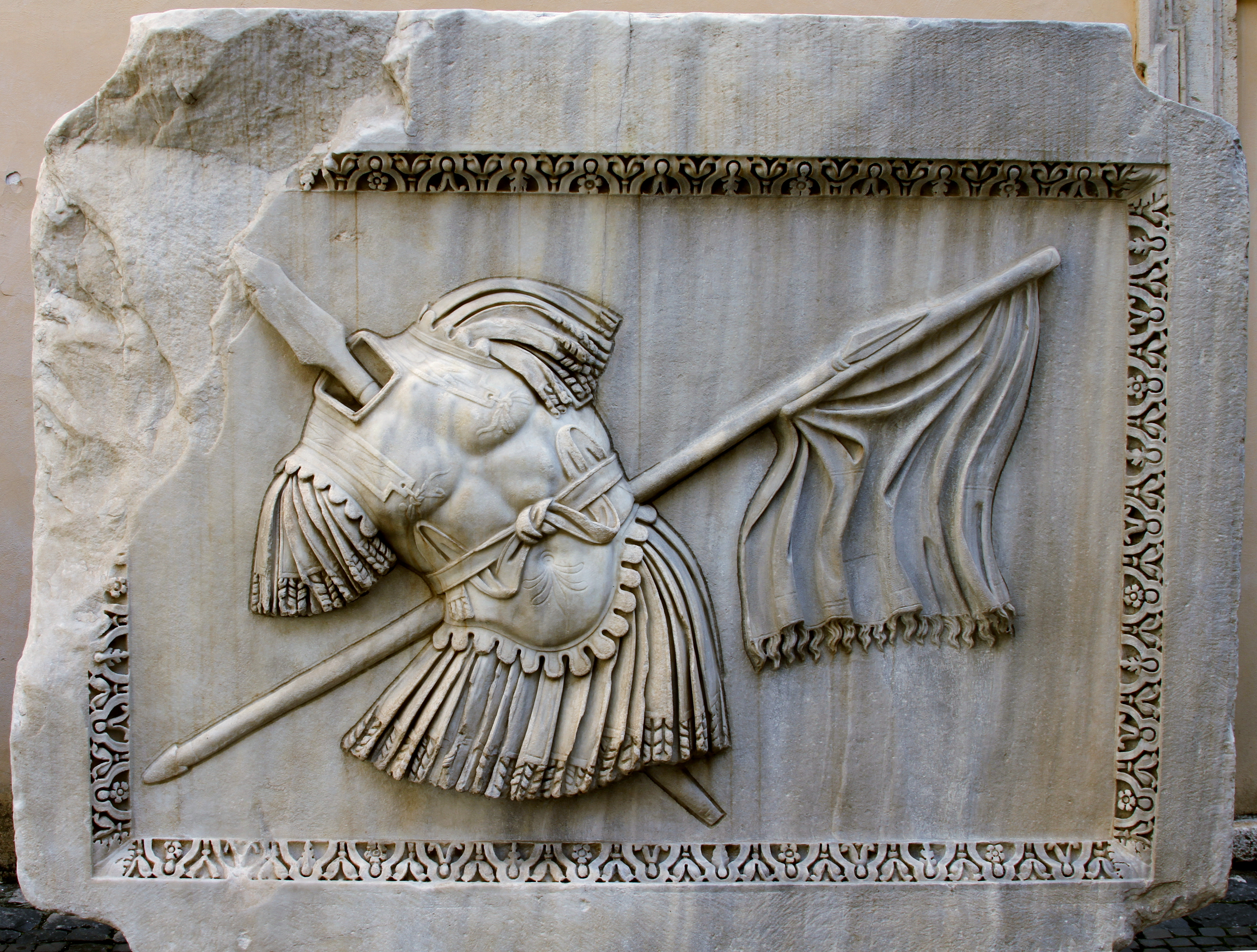
Trophy

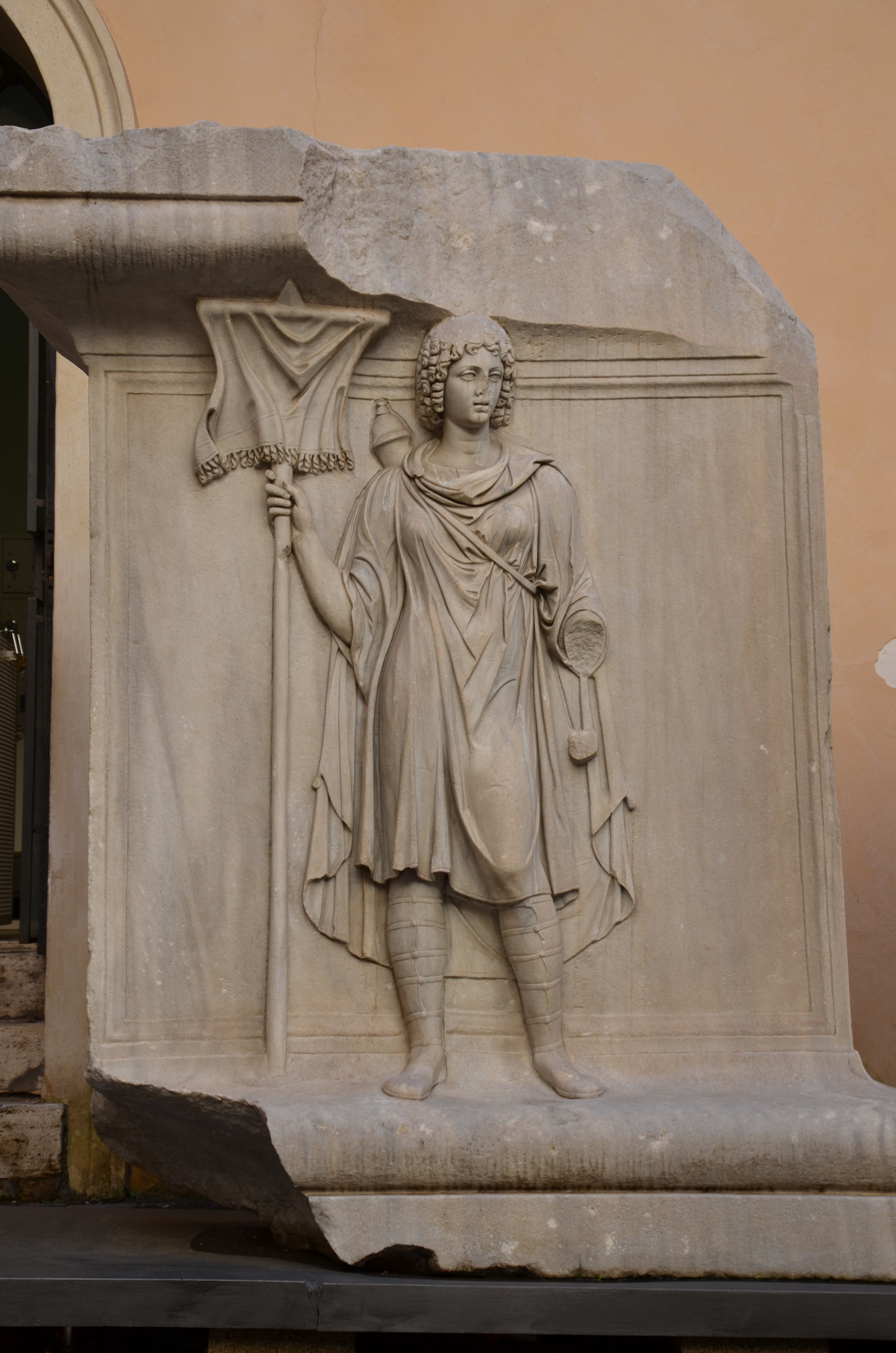
Mauretania (?)

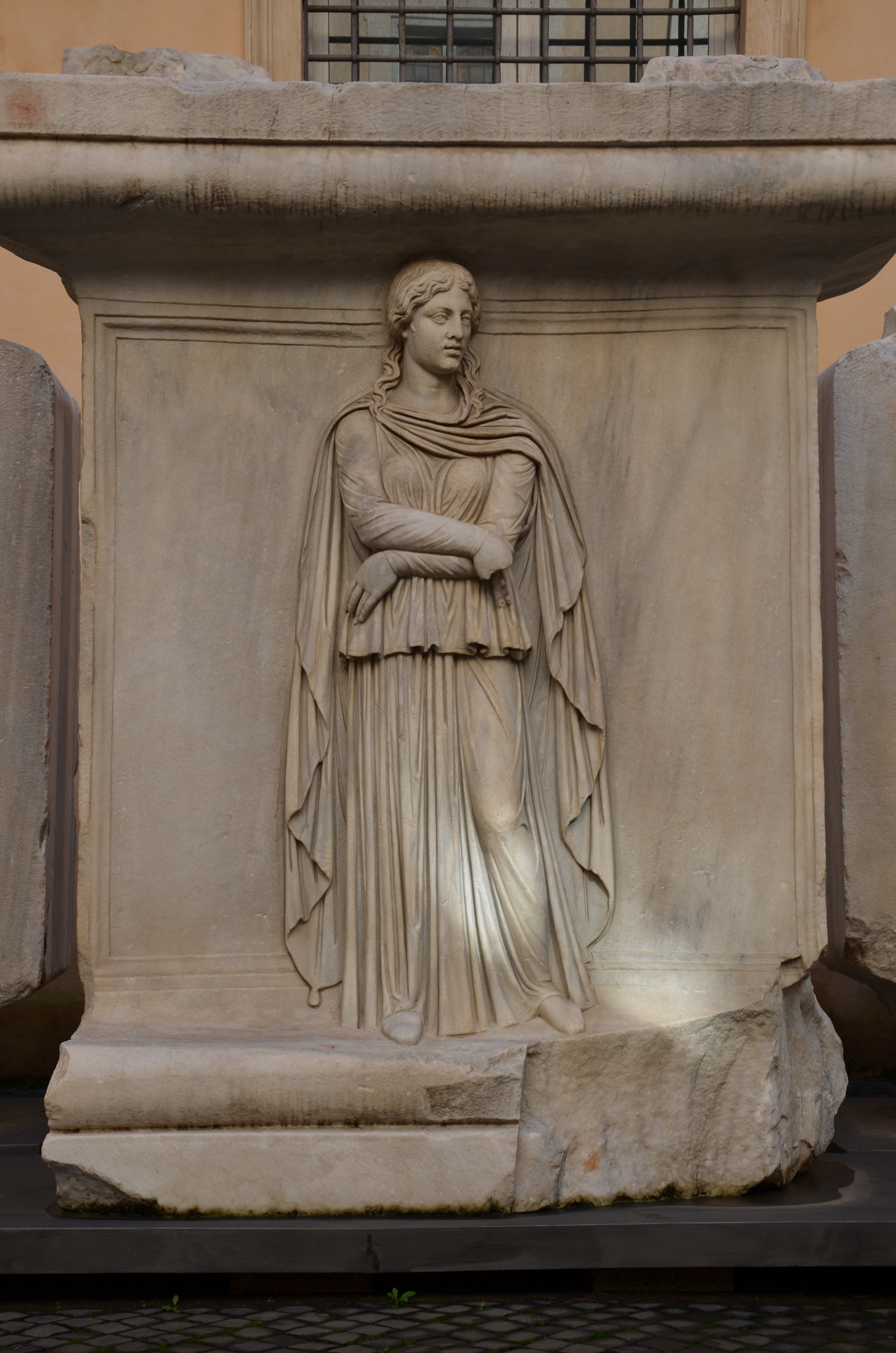
Gaul or Germania

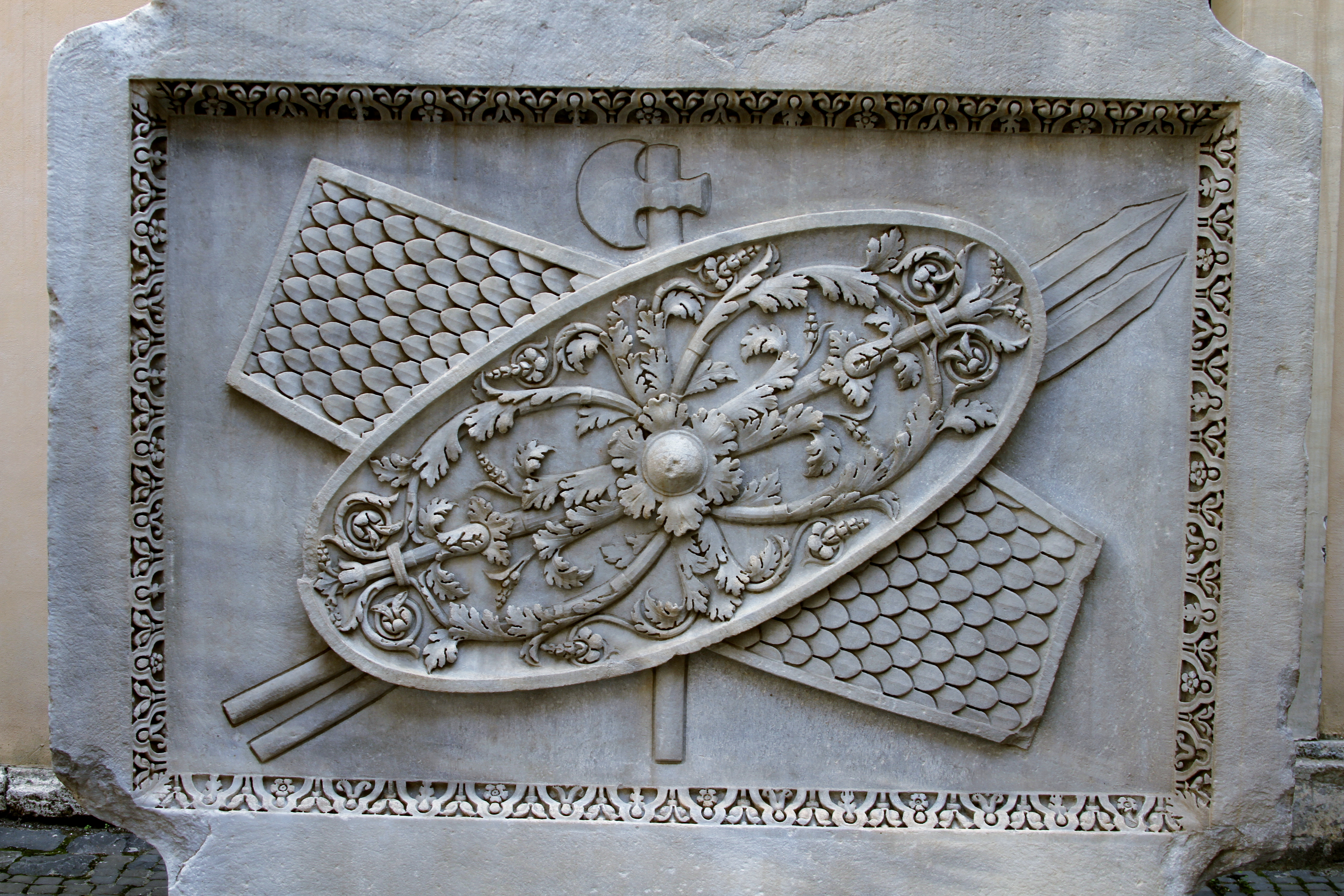
Trophy

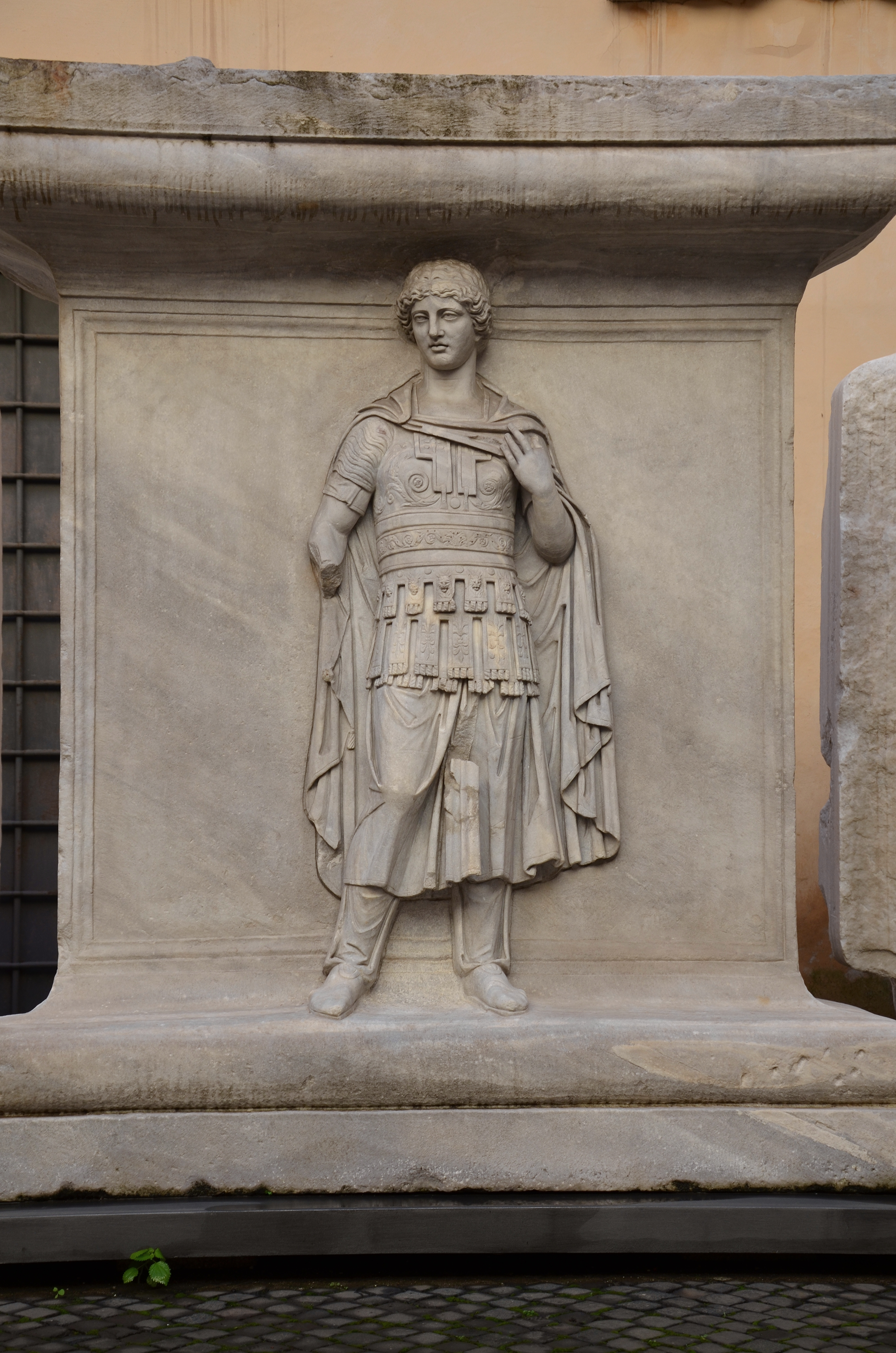
Hispania (?)

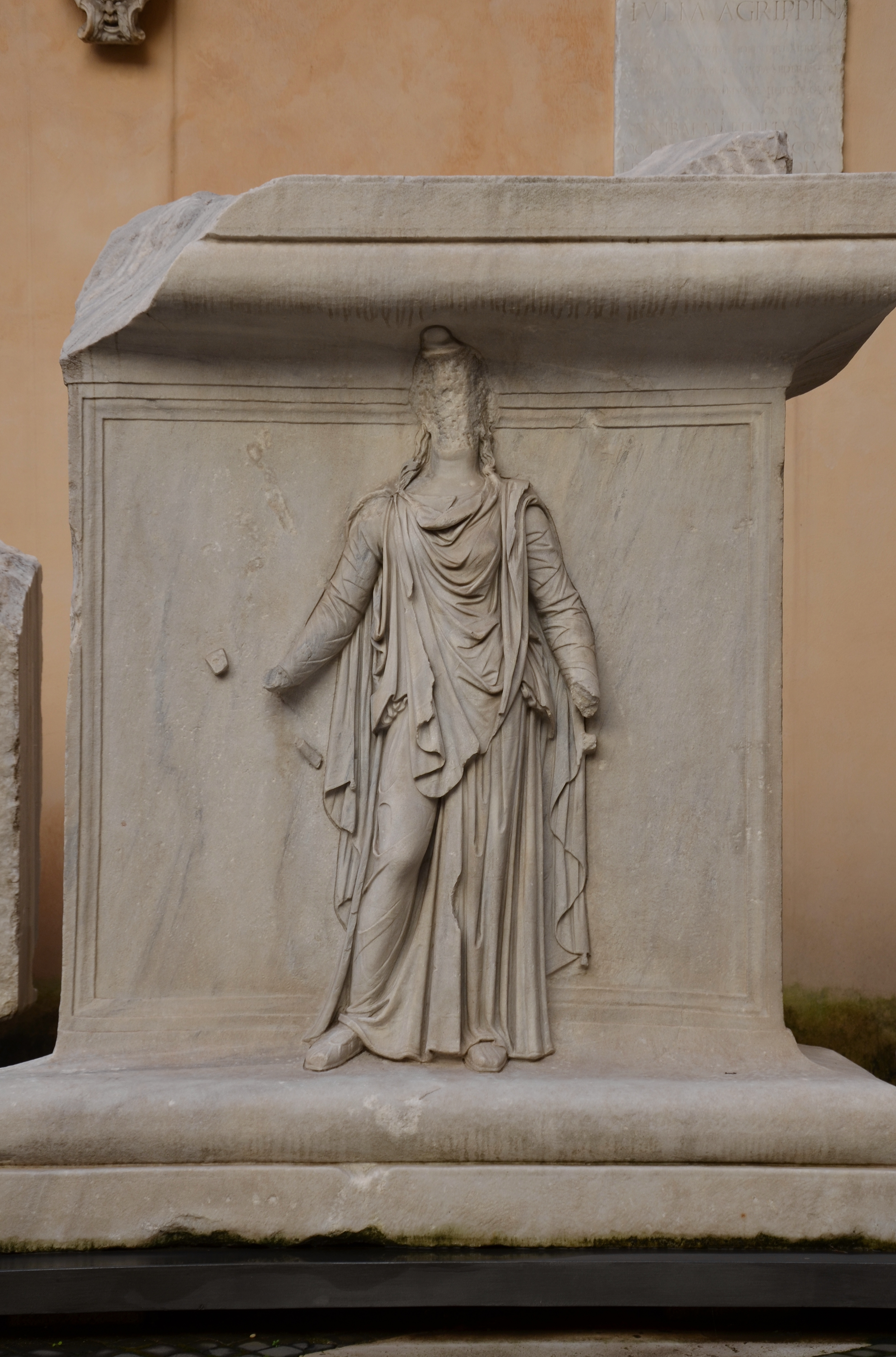
Bithynia or Dacia

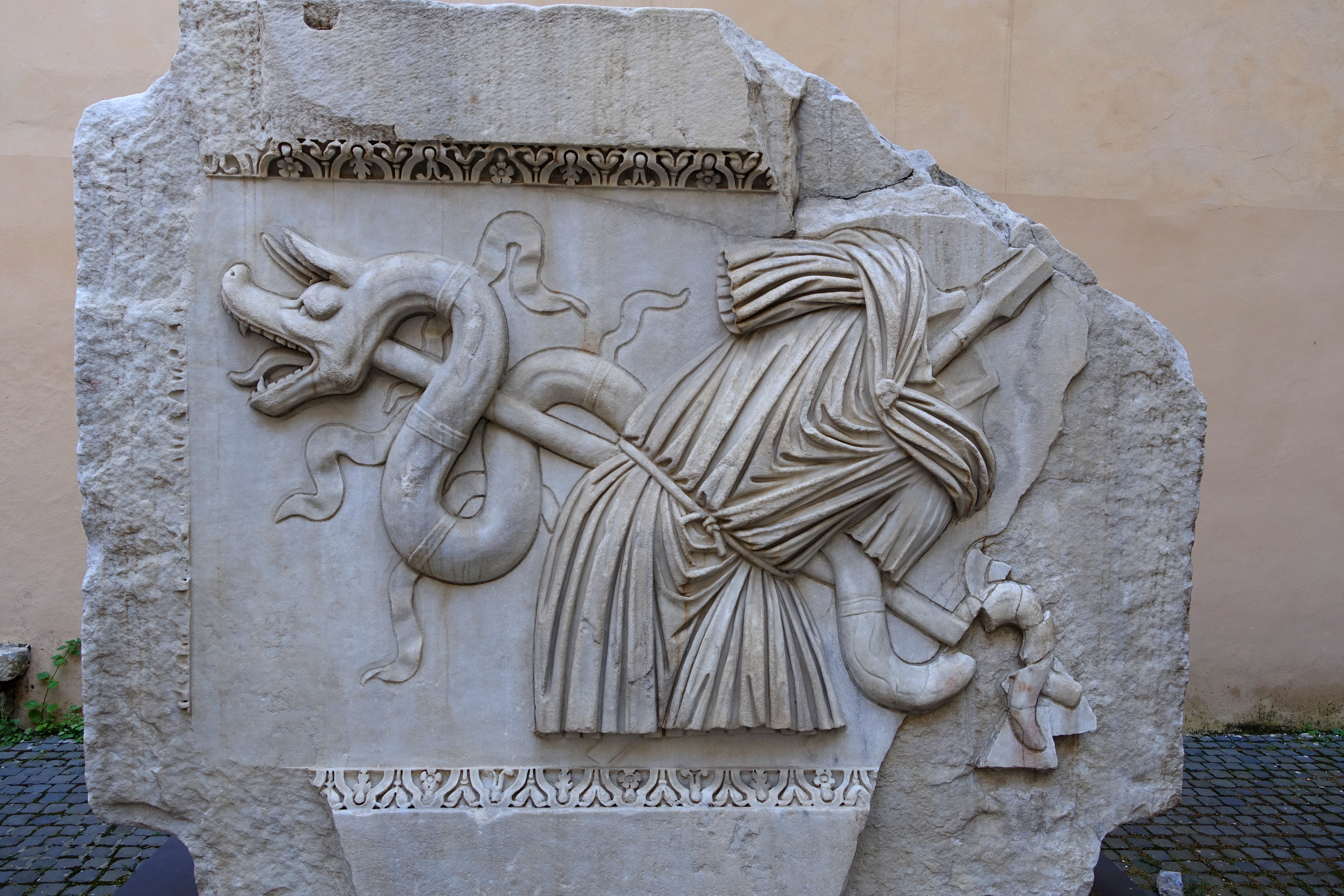
Trophy

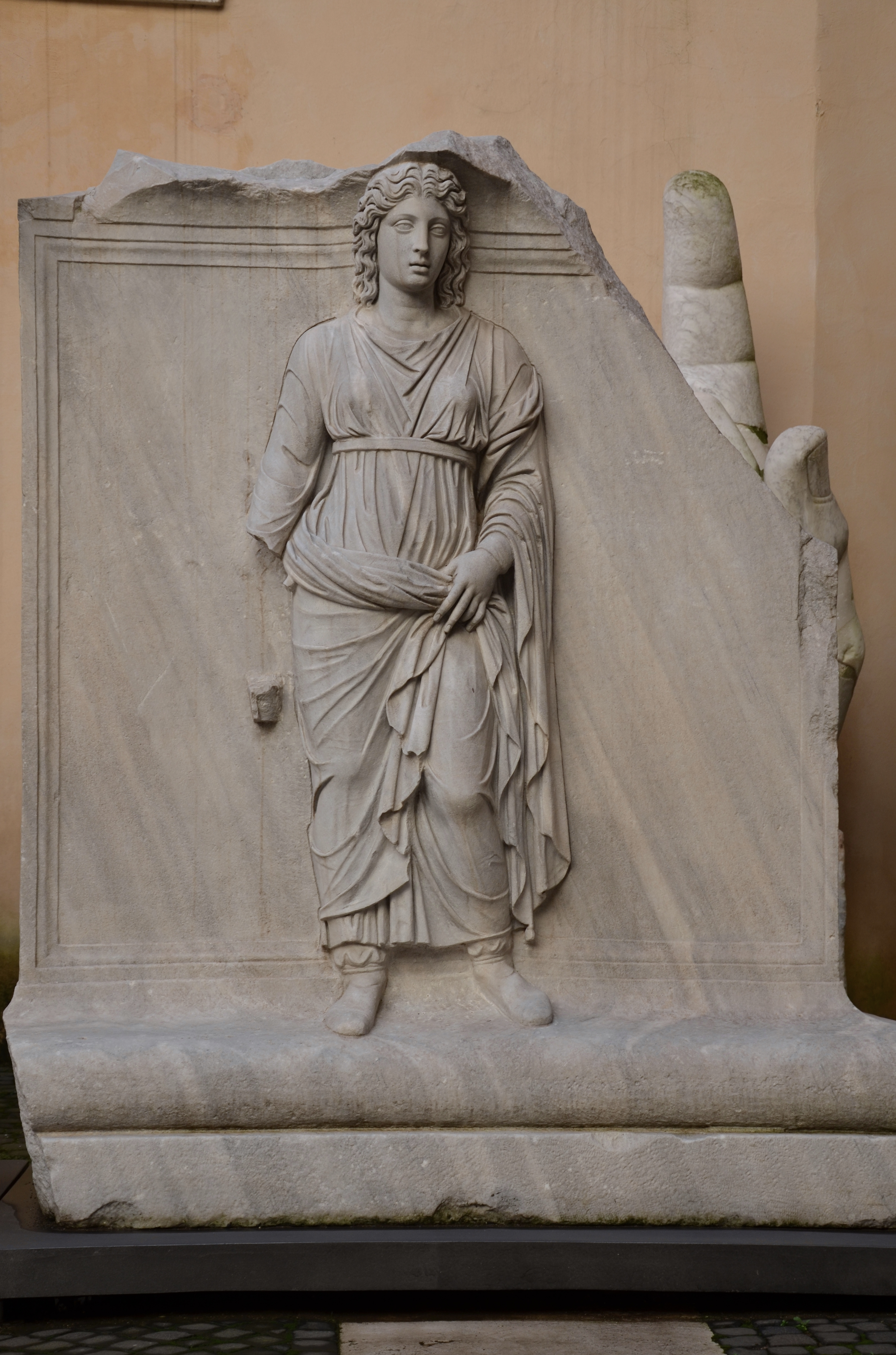
Libya or Numidia
- National Roman Museum, Palazzo Massimo:
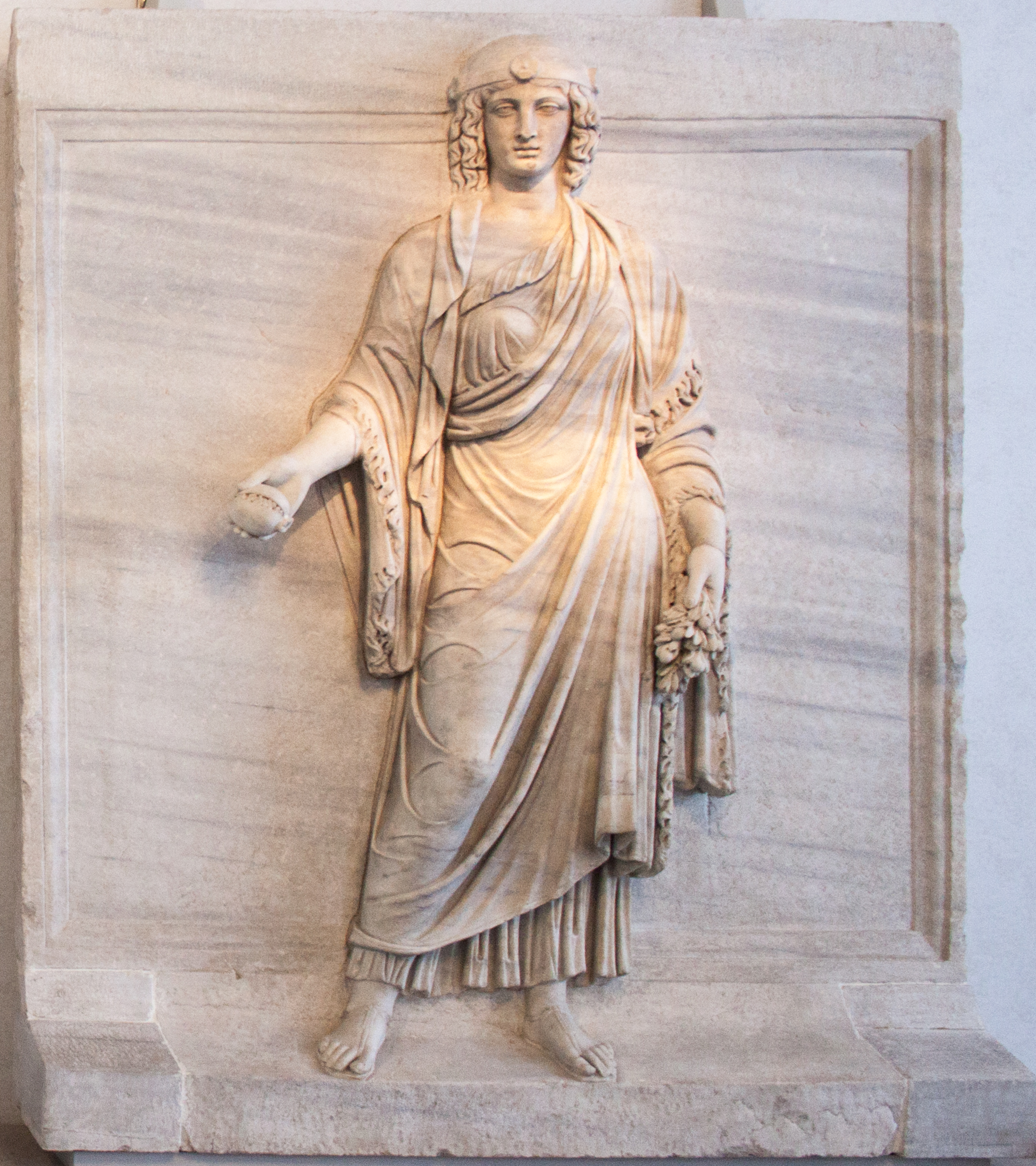
Egypt (?)

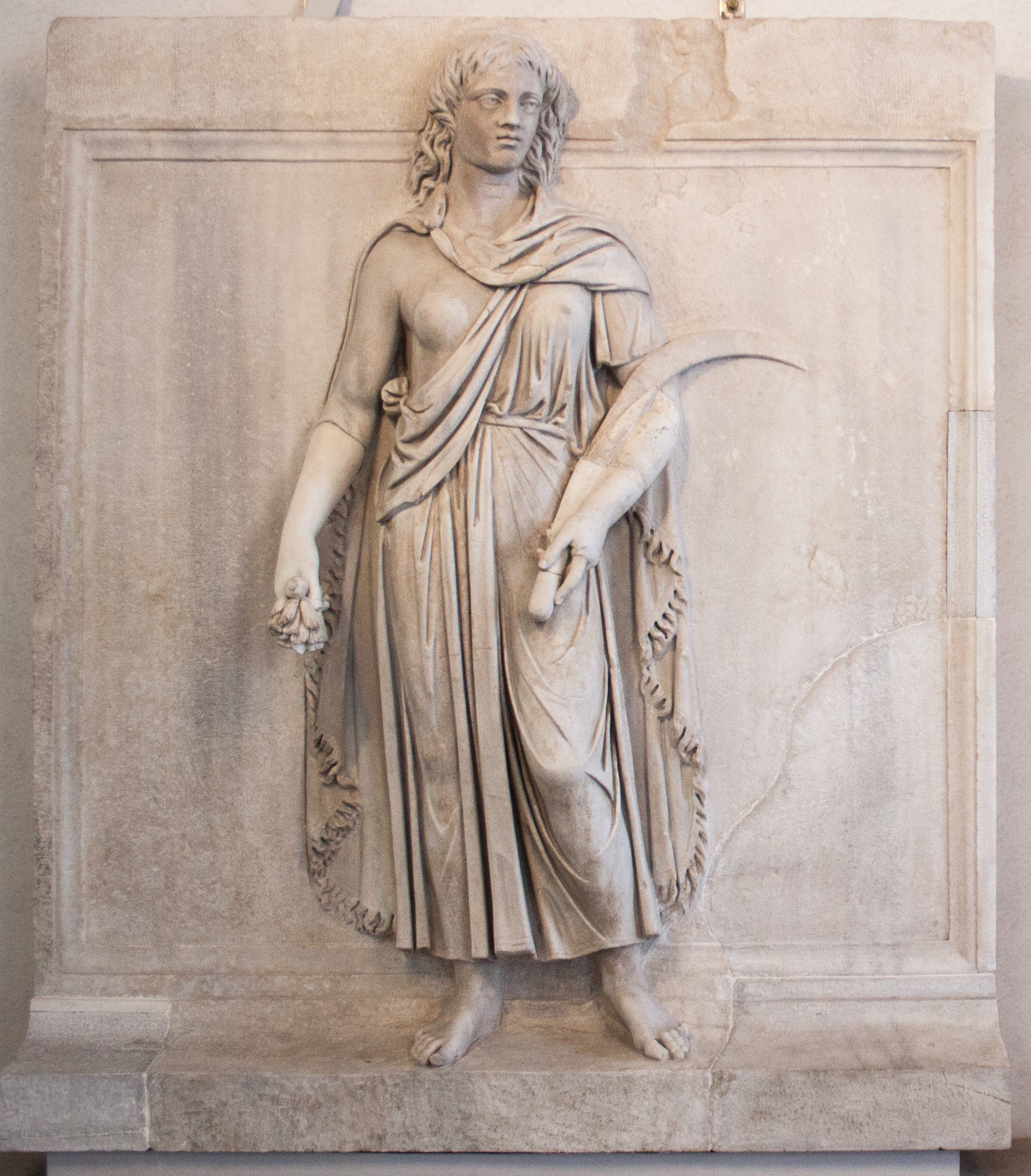
Thrace or Dacia
- National Archaeological Museum, Naples:
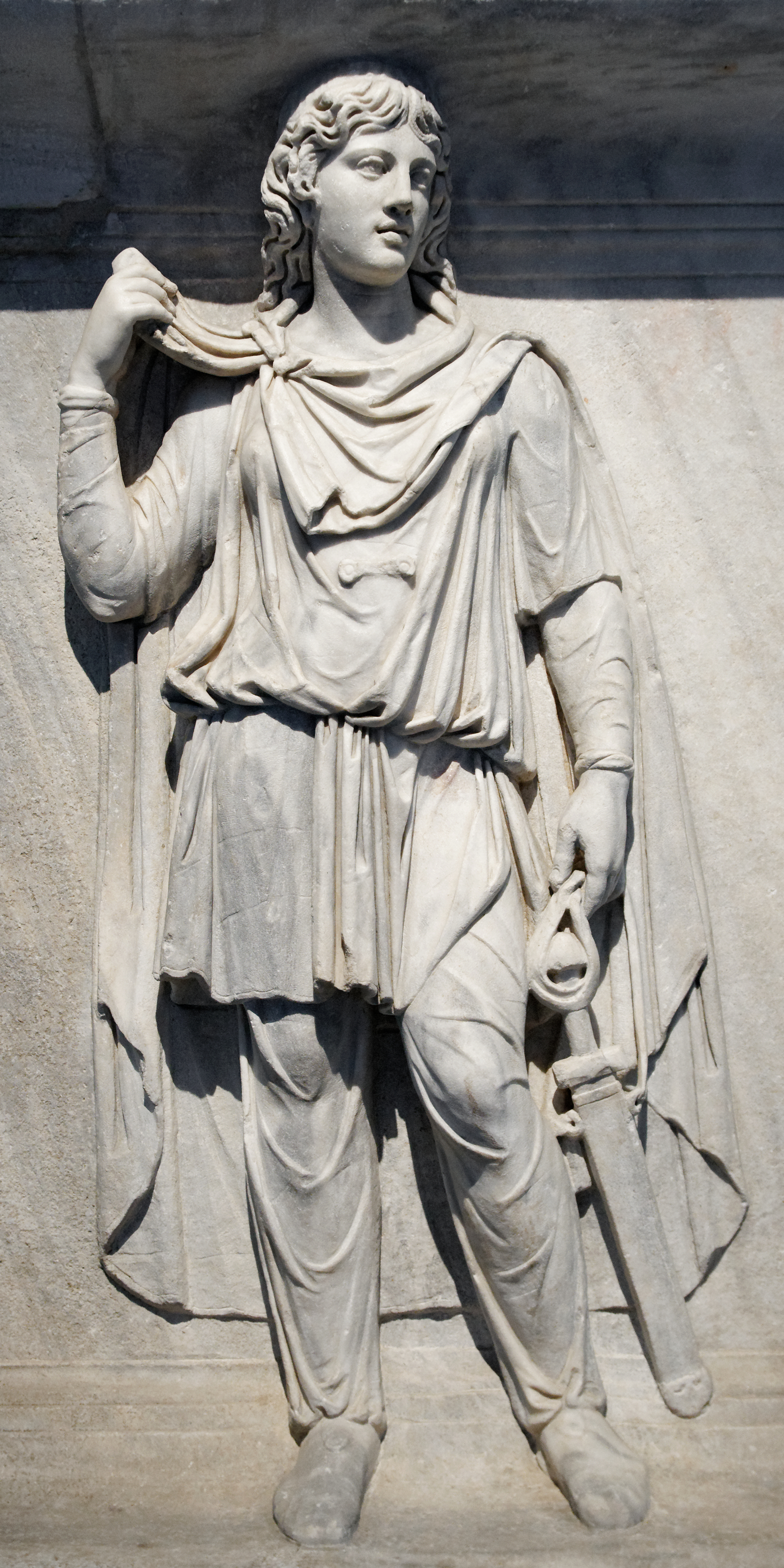
Parthia or Armenia

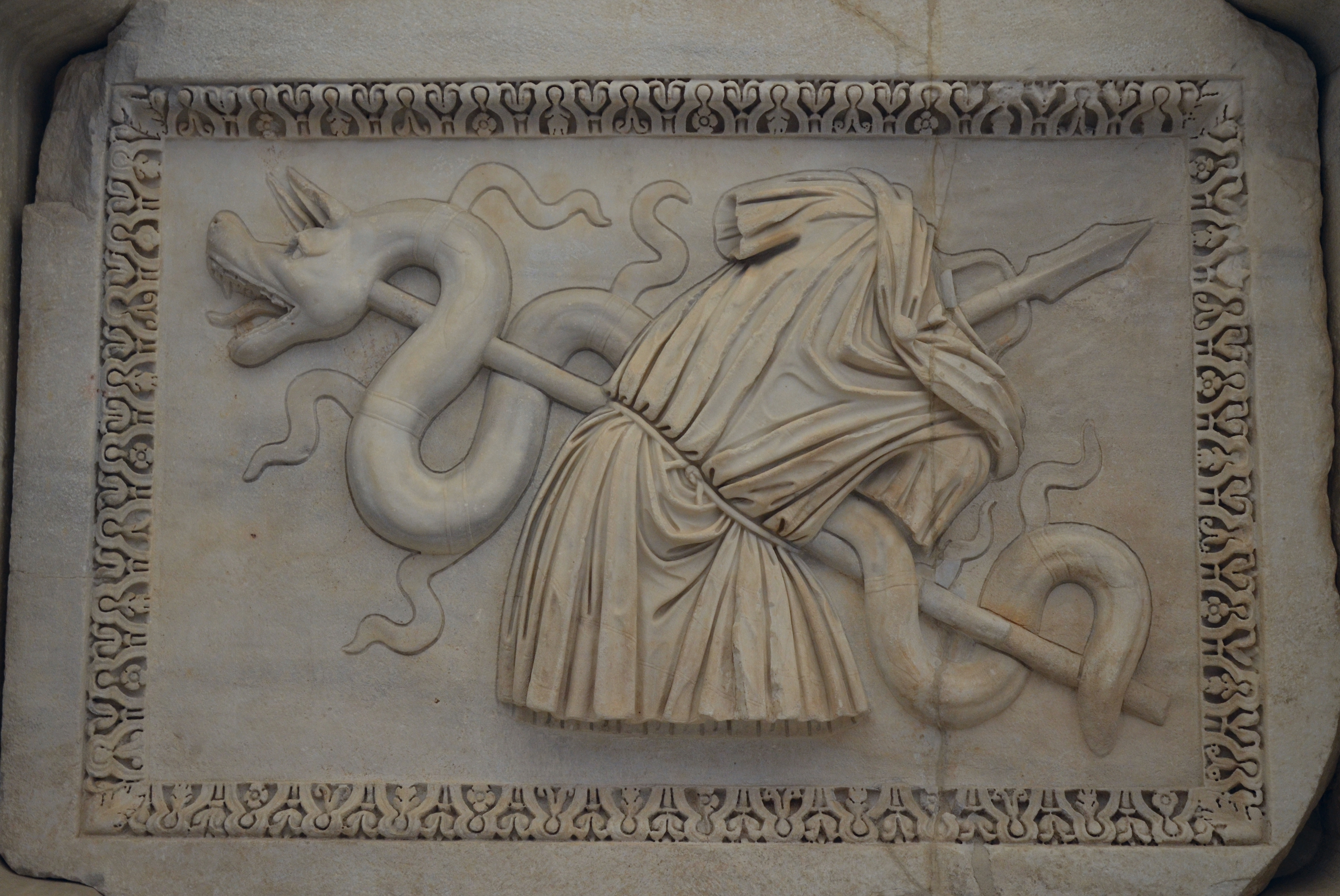
Trophy

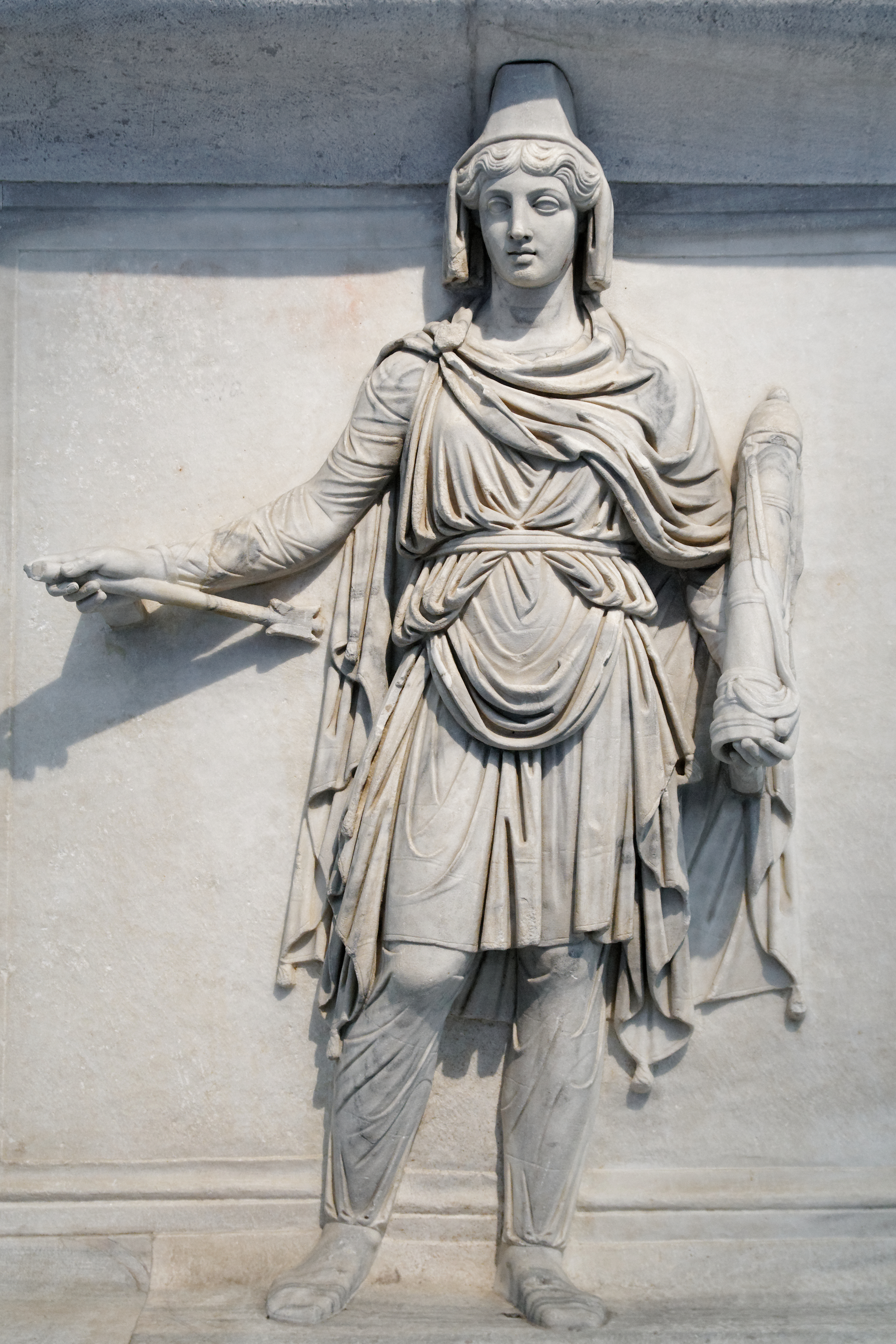
Likely Armenia

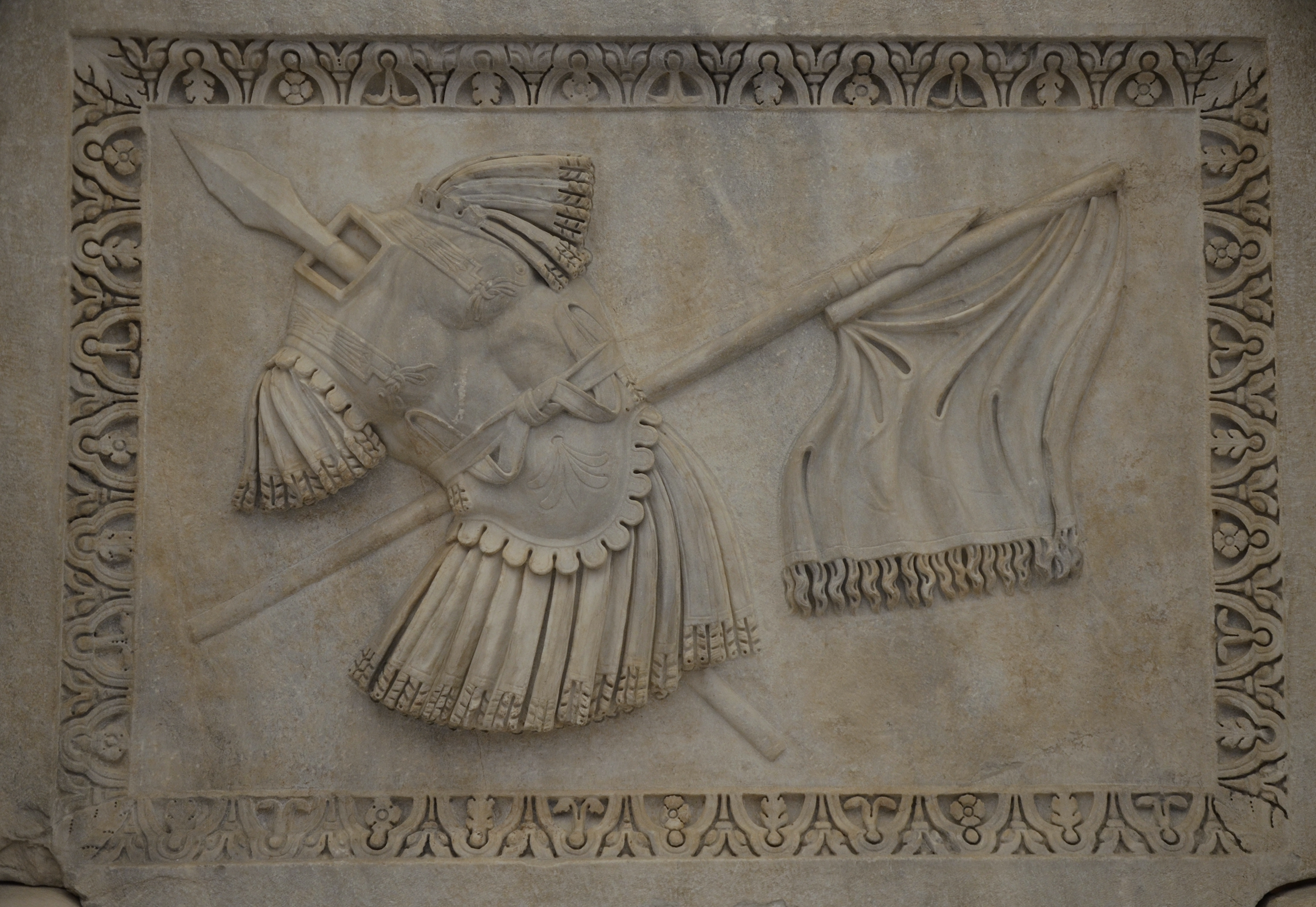
Trophy

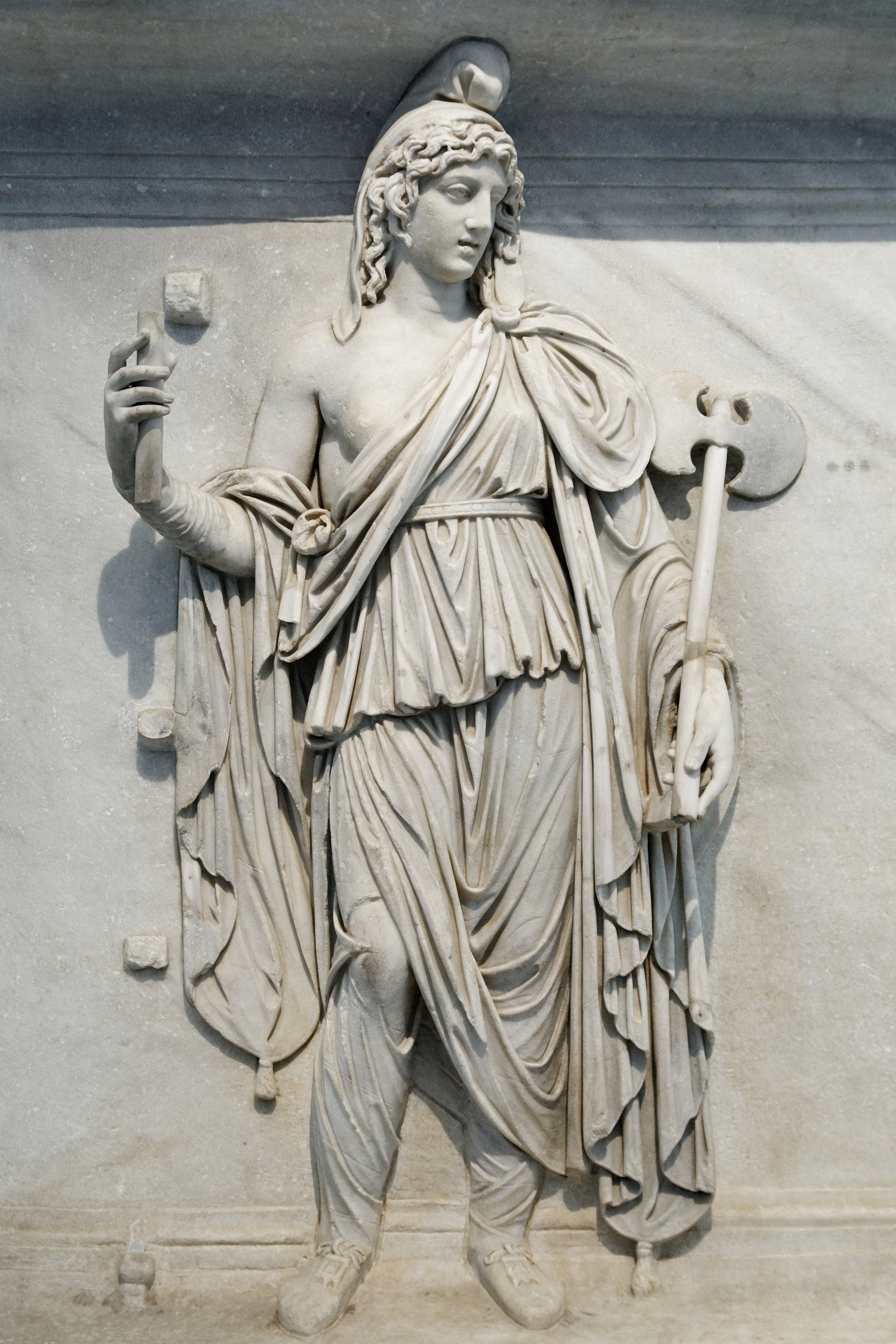
Phrygia or Bithynia

== See also ==
- List of Ancient Roman temples
- Temple of Hercules Victor – Ancient religious monument in Rome, Italy

Preceded by Temple of Apollo Sosianus	Landmarks of Rome; Temple of Hadrian	Succeeded by Temple of Hercules Victor
