= Tosetti =

Tosetti is a surname. Notable people with the surname include:

- Gilbert Tosetti (1879–1923), English cricketer
- Matteo Tosetti (born 1992), Swiss footballer

== See also ==
- Tonetti
