= Mary Tinetti =

American physician

- Education: University of Michigan, University of Rochester
- Awards: MacArthur Fellows Program
- Scientific career
- Fields: physician
- Workplaces: Yale University
- Academic advisors: T. Franklin Williams

Mary Tinetti is an American physician, and Gladys Phillips Crofoot Professor of Medicine and Epidemiology and Public Health at Yale University, and Director of the Yale Program on Aging.

== Life ==
She graduated from the University of Michigan at Ann Arbor with a B.A. in 1973, and from the University of Michigan Medical School with an M.D. in 1978. She was a resident at the University of Minnesota. She studied on a geriatric fellowship at the University of Rochester with Dr. T. Franklin Williams. She pioneered the study of morbidity due to falls by elderly people, and investigated risk-reduction strategies that were both effective and cost-effective.

== Awards ==
- 2009 MacArthur Fellows Program
- 2010 Maxwell Pollack Award
- 2017 Kent Award

== Works ==
- "A Multifactorial Intervention to Reduce the Risk of Falling among Elderly People Living in the Community", The New England Journal of Medicine, Volume 331:821-827, September 29, 1994, Number 13
