= Tonetti =

Tonetti is a surname of Italian origin. Notable people with this surname include:

== Given names ==
- Gianluca Tonetti (born 1967), Italian former road cyclist
- Gino Tonetti (born 1941 or 1942), Italian and American singer
- Kyle Tonetti (born 1987), South African-born Irish rugby union player
- Mary Lawrence Tonetti (1868–1945), American sculptor
- Riccardo Tonetti (born 1989), Italian alpine ski racer

== Fictional characters ==
- Tonetti, a character in The Gay Divorcee
